= Uruguayan pavilion =

Venice Biennale national pavilion

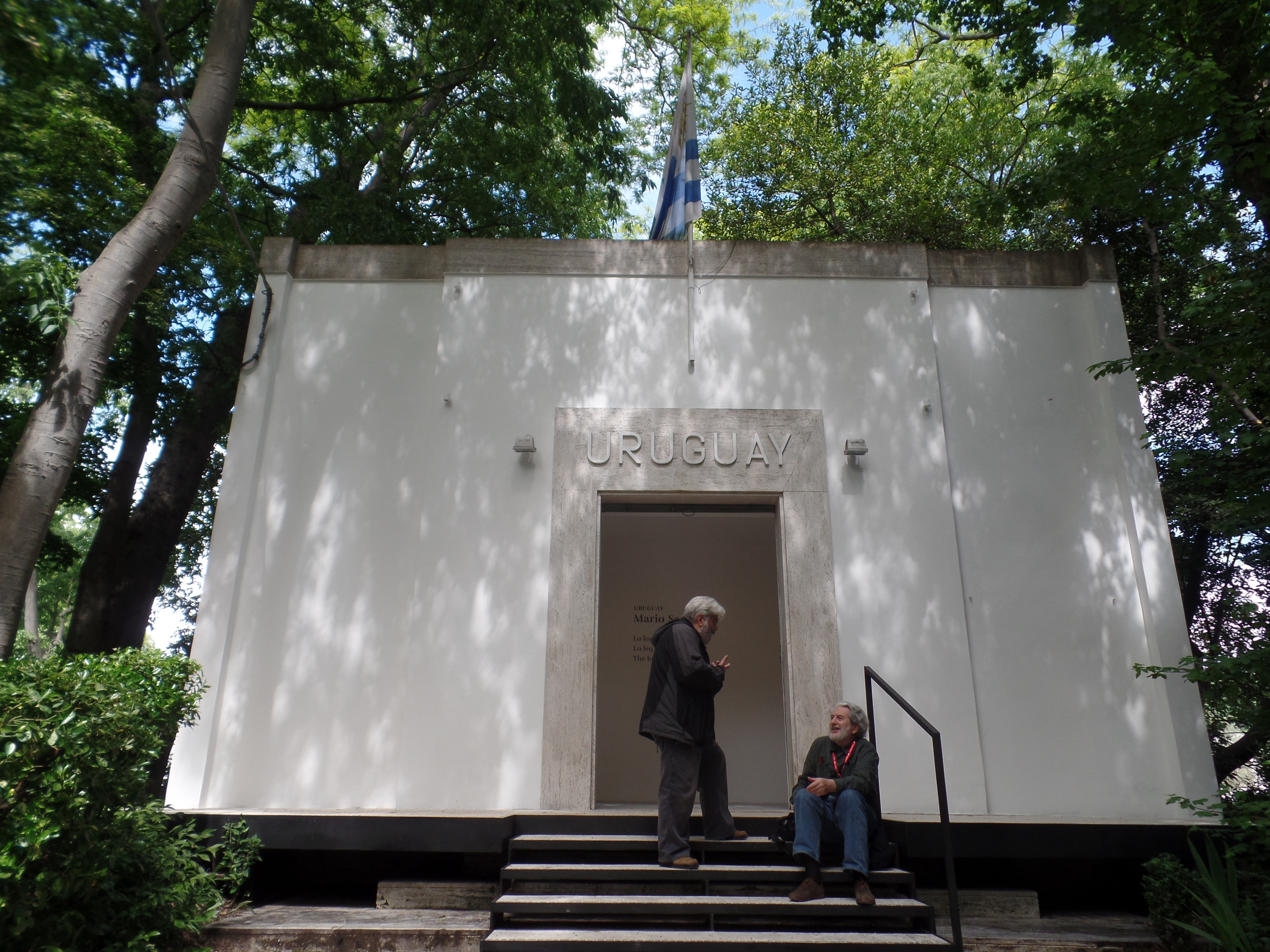
The Uruguayan pavilion

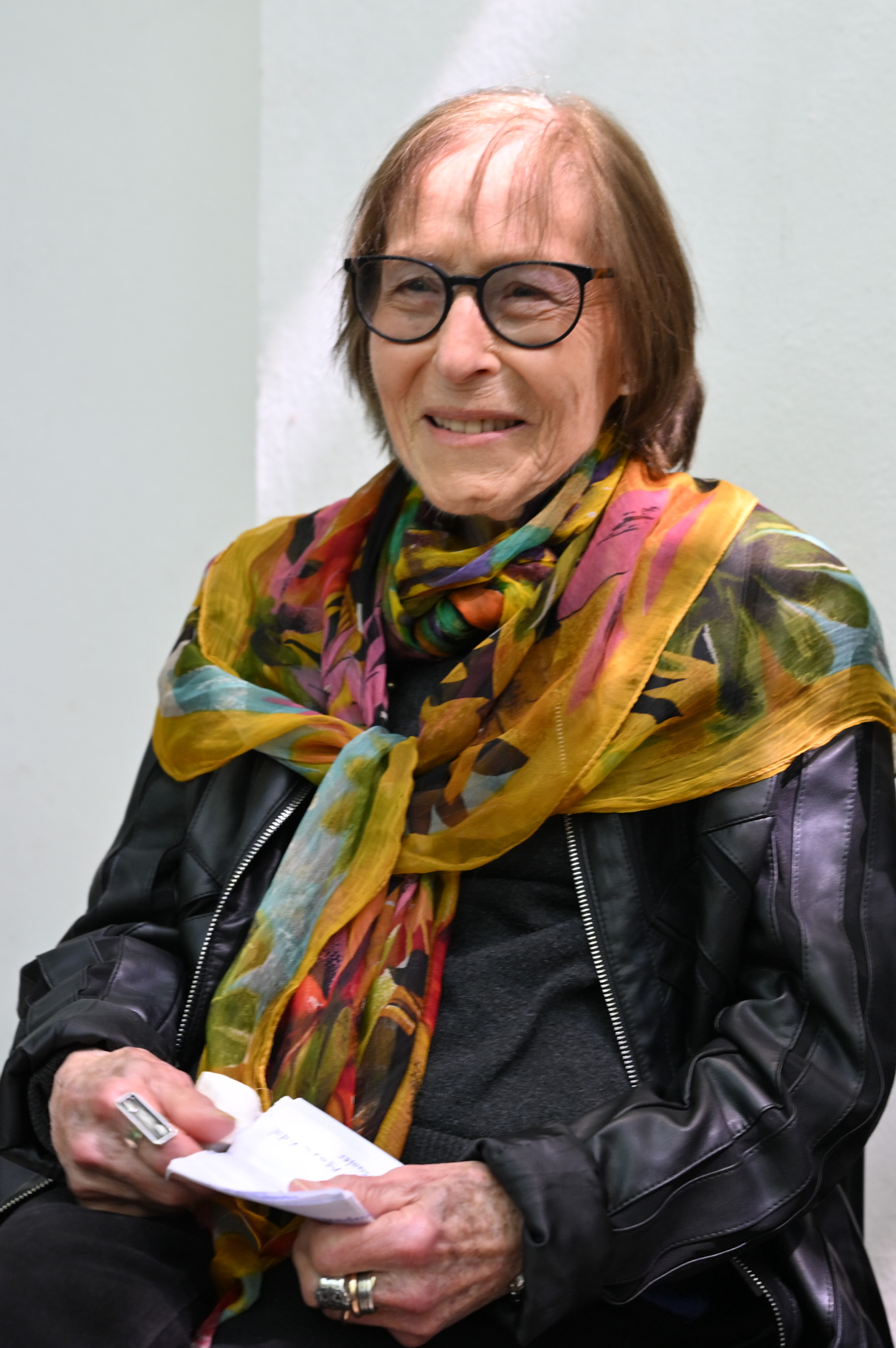
Margaret Whyte at the Biennale di Venezia 2026

The Uruguayan pavilion houses Uruguay's national representation during the Venice Biennale arts festivals.

== Background ==
The Venice Biennale is an international art biennial exhibition held in Venice, Italy. Often described as "the Olympics of the art world", participation in the Biennale is a prestigious event for contemporary artists. The festival has become a constellation of shows: a central exhibition curated by that year's artistic director, national pavilions hosted by individual nations, and independent exhibitions held throughout Venice. The Biennale's parent organisation also runs regular festivals in other arts: architecture, dance, film, music and theatre.

Outside the central international exhibition, individual nations produce their own shows, known as pavilions, as their national representation. Nations that own their pavilion buildings – such as the 30 housed in the Giardini – are responsible for their own upkeep and construction costs as well. Nations without dedicated buildings create pavilions in venues throughout the city.

== Organization and building ==
The pavilion was originally a warehouse built for the 1958 Biennale. It was adapted into a gallery space between 1960 and 1962.

== Representation by year ==
=== Art ===
- 1954 — José Cuneo Perinetti, Severino Pose
- 1956 — Joaquín Torres García
- 1960 — Zoma Baitler, Washington Barcala, Norberto Berdia, José Cuneo, José Echave, Adolfo Halty, Augusto Torres, Vicente Martìn, Julio Verdier (Commissioner: Jorge Páez Vilaró)
- 1962 — Germán Cabrera, Juan Ventayol
- 1964 — Jorge Damiani, José Gamarra, Nelson Ramos, Jorge Páez Vilaró (Commissioner: Luis García Pardo)
- 1968 — Antonio Frasconi (Commissioner: Angel Kalenberg)
- 1970 — Taller de Montevideo (Armando Bergallo, Ernesto Vila, Héctor Vilche) (Commissioner: Angel Kalenberg)
- 1972 — Luis Alberto Solari (Commissioner: Angel Kalenberg)
- 1986 — Ernesto Aroztegui, Clever Lara (Commissioner: Angel Kalenberg)
- 1988 — Luis Camnitzer (Commissioner: Angel Kalenberg)
- 1990 — Gonzalo Fonseca (Commissioner: Angel Kalenberg)
- 1993 — Águeda Dicancro
- 1995 — Ignacio Iturria (Commissioner: Angel Kalenberg)
- 1997 — Nelson Ramos
- 1999 — Ricardo Pascale
- 2001 — Rimer Cardillo (Commissioner: Clever Lara)
- 2003 — Pablo Atchugarry (Curator: Luciano Caramel)
- 2005 — Lacy Duarte (Commissioners: Alicia Haber, Olga Larnaudie)
- 2007 — Ernesto Vila (Commissioner: Enrique Aguerre)
- 2009 — Raquel Bessio, Juan Burgos, Pablo Uribe (Commissioners: Patricia Bentancur, Alfredo Torres)
- 2011 — Alejandro Cesarco, Magela Ferrero (Curator: Clio Bugel)
- 2013 — Wifredo Díaz Valdéz (Curators: Carlos Capelán, Verónica Cordeiro)
- 2015 — Marco Maggi (Curator: Patricia Bentancur)
- 2017 — Mario Sagradini (Curator: Gabriel Peluffo Linari)
- 2019 — Yamandú Canosa (Curators: Patricia Bentancur, David Amengol)
- 2022 — Gerardo Goldwasser (Curators: Pablo Uribe, Laura Malosetti Costa)
- 2024 — Eduardo Cardozo (Curator: Elisa Valerio)
- 2026 — Margaret Whyte (Curator: Patricia Bentancur)

== Bibliography ==
- Russeth, Andrew (April 17, 2019). "The Venice Biennale: Everything You Could Ever Want to Know". ARTnews.
- Volpi, Cristiana (2013). "Uruguay". In Re Rebaudengo, Adele (ed.). Pavilions and Garden of Venice Biennale. Rome: Contrasto. p. 191. ISBN 978-88-6965-440-4.
