= List of Uruguayan women artists =

This is a list of women artists who were born in Uruguay or whose artworks are closely associated with that country.

== A ==
- Gladys Afamado (1925–2024), poet and visual artist
- Bárbara Álvarez (born 1970), cinematographer
- Elsa Andrada (1920–2010), painter and upholsterer

== B ==
- Blanca Luz Brum (1905–1985), writer and artist

== C ==
- Josefina Canel Suarez de Gallesio (1915–2004), visual artist and painter
- Agustina Casas Sere-Leguizamon (born 1984), digital artist

== D ==
- Águeda Dicancro (1938–2019), sculptor
- Lacy Duarte (1937–2015), visual artist

== F ==
- Beatriz Flores Silva (born 1956), film director

== G ==
- María Helena García Brunel (1917–1996), painter
- Alejandra González Soca (born 1973), artist and psychologist
- Leonilda González (1923–2017), painter and engraver

== H ==
- Gabriela Hearst (born 1976), garment designer
- Magali Herrera (1914–1992), artist and writer

== I ==
- Eloísa Ibarra (born 1968), visual artist

== K ==
- Mônica Kabregu Bernasconi (born 1947), ceramicist

== L ==
- Hilda López (1922–1996), painter and sculptor

== M ==
- María Esther Mendy (born 1910), painter
- Jill Mulleady (born 1980), painter

== N ==
- Adela Neffa (1922-2019), sculptor

== O ==
- Raquel Orzuj (1939–2018), cartoonist and artist

== P ==
- Agó Páez Vilaró (born 1954), plastic artist
- Virginia Patrone (born 1950), painter
- Manolita Piña (1883–1994), painter
- Olga Piria (1927–2015), artist, pianist, and goldsmith

== R ==
- Quela Rovira (1917–2014), painter and sculptor

== S ==
- Elián Stolarsky (born 1990), visual artist and illustrator

== T ==
- Ana Tiscornia (born 1951), visual artist

== U ==
- Mariví Ugolino (born 1943), sculptor

== V ==
- Petrona Viera (1895–1960), painter
- Cecilia Vignolo (born 1971), visual artist and teacher

== W ==
- Margaret Whyte (born 1940), visual artist

== Z ==
- Guma Zorrilla (1919–2001), costume designer
