= Figari Award =

Art prize in Uruguay

- Named for Pedro Figari
- Awarded for: Uruguayan visual arts
- Sponsored by: Central Bank of Uruguay; DNC, MEC; Museo Figari
- Country: Uruguay
- First award: 1995
- Currently held by: Marcelo Legrand

The Figari Award (Spanish: Premio Figari) is given annually to visual artists from Uruguay in recognition of their careers. It was instituted in 1995 by the Central Bank of Uruguay, at the initiative of the then president of the institution, economist and sculptor Ricardo Pascale. Since 2010, the organization of the award has been in the charge of the Museo Figari, under the National Directorate of Culture (DNC) of the Ministry of Education and Culture (MEC).

It is a recognition of artists in activity that represents a consecration in their line of work. Of non-competitive nature, in each edition an organizing committee proposes a qualified jury that is in charge of analyzing the situation of the most outstanding artists, reviewing their achievements, career, and impact in the local and international scope.

== Format ==
Since its inception, the modality and format of the award has been changing, although not its purpose. In the first edition a call was made, five finalists were selected, and a First Prize was awarded. As of the second edition, the competition was eliminated and three prizes of equal economic value were awarded. Some editions were characterized by rewarding three artists of the same discipline or with similar formal characteristics.

Beginning in its tenth edition, the participation of the Uruguayan Association of Art Critics (AUCA) was included in the selection and organization. This lasted until 2009, when a loan agreement was signed with the Ministry of Education and Culture and the award began to be managed by the National Directorate of Culture, and the "Figari Space" became the headquarters of the Museo Figari.

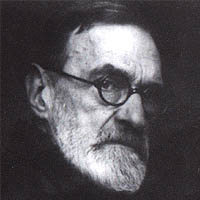
Pedro Figari

Since its 15th edition, the Figari Award has been given annually to a single artist, in recognition of his or her career and encouragement to national creation.

In 2011, a retrospective was held at the National Museum of Visual Arts with the works of the 47 artists honored in the award's 15 editions.

== Recognition of artistic work ==
With its name, the prize pays homage to Pedro Figari (1861–1938), one of the most influential figures in the gestation of an integral awareness of the Uruguayan artistic milieu. As a lawyer, legislator, politician, journalist, teacher, and artist, Figari's activity was marked by a vital concern for cultural issues, the recognition of local values and the creation of a national cultural identity.

== Awards ==
Year	Artist(s)	Jury
1995	Jorge Damiani (First Prize), Clarel Neme, Amalia Nieto, Juan Storm, Américo Spósito	Jorge Abbondanza, Jorge Glusberg, Ángel Kalenberg
1996	María Freire, Manuel Pailós, Nelson Ramos	Humberto Capote, Ricardo Pascale, Ángel Kalenberg, Jorge Abbondanza
1997	Guillermo Fernández, Hermenegildo Sábat, Alfredo Testoni	Humberto Capote, Ricardo Pascale, Ángel Kalenberg, Jorge Abbondanza
1998	Mario Lorieto, Hugo Nantes, Octavio Podesta	Humberto Capote, Ricardo Pascale, Ángel Kalenberg
1999	Cecilia Brugnini, Jorge Abbondanza/Enrique Silveira, Águeda Dicancro, Wifredo Díaz Valdéz, Antonio Frasconi	Humberto Capote, Ricardo Pascale, Ángel Kalenberg
2000	Miguel Battegazzore, Manuel Espínola Gómez	Ricardo Pascale, Ángel Kalenberg, Guillermo Gómez Platero, Carlos Ranguís
2001	Rimer Cardillo, Enrique Broglia, Ignacio Iturria, Clever Lara	Ángel Kalenberg, Carlos Ranguis, Ricardo Pascale, Jorge Abbondanza
2002	Lacy Duarte, Carlos Musso, Carlos Tonelli	Jorge Abbondanza, Ángel Kalenberg, Ricardo Pascale
2003	Fernando Cabezudo, Anhelo Hernández, Ernesto Vila	Jorge Abbondanza, Aureliano Berro, Ángel Kalenberg, Olga Larnaudie, Ricardo Pascale
2004	Dumas Oroño, Magalí Sánchez, Jorge Sosa	Jorge Abbondanza, Aureliano Berro, Ángel Kalenberg, Olga Larnaudie, Ricardo Pascale
2005	Rodolfo Ian Uricchio, Clemente Padín, Nelbia Romero	Patricia Bentancur, Olga Larnaudie, Alfredo Torres
2006	Leonilda González, Carlos Caffera, Mario Sagradini	Pablo Thiago Rocca, Fernando Loustaunau, Alicia Haber
2007	Haroldo González, Yamandú Canosa, Manuel Aguiar	Nelson Di Maggio, Patricia Bentancur, Clio Bugel
2008	Gladys Afamado, Fernando Álvarez Cozzi, Hugo Alíes	Olga Larnaudie, Enrique Aguerre, Manuel Neves

From the loan agreement signed between the Central Bank of Uruguay and the MEC in 2009, the Figari Award began to be managed by the National Directorate of Culture of the MEC and the Museo Figari. That year the award was not given, and since 2010 it has been delivered to a single artist in each edition.

Year	Artist	Jury
2010	Diana Mines	Octavio Podestá, Nelbia Romero, Pedro Da Cruz
2011	Oscar Larroca	Jorge Abbondanza, Águeda Dicancro, Tatiana Oroño
2012	Marco Maggi	Patricia Bentancur, Ignacio Iturria, Ángel Kalenberg
2013	Carlos Capelán	Sonia Bandrymer, Wifredo Díaz Valdéz, Fernando Loustaunau
2014	Margaret Whyte	Olga Larnaudie, Lacy Duarte, Enrique Aguerre
2015	Domingo Ferreira	Patricia Bentancur, Haroldo González, Gabriel Peluffo Linari
2016	Pablo Uribe	Diana Mines, Alfredo Torres, Ricardo Pascale
2017	Daniel Gallo	Oscar Larroca, Raquel Pereda, Elisa Roubaud
2018	Marcelo Legrand	Hugo Achugar, Alicia Haber, Margaret Whyte
2019	Virginia Patrone	Riccardo Boglione, Verónica Panella, Silvia Listur
2021	Linda Kohen	María Eugenia Grau, Daniel Gallo, Elena O'Neill
