= Hilda López =

Uruguayan painter and sculptor (1922–1996)

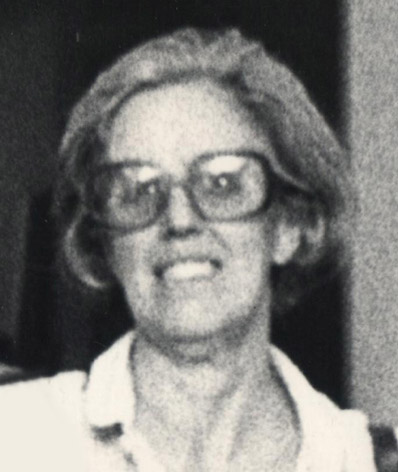
- Born: 27 September 1922; Montevideo, Uruguay
- Died: 2 June 1996 (aged 73); Montevideo, Uruguay
- Occupations: Plastic artist, painter, sculptor
- Spouse: Alberto Angenscheidt

Hilda López (27 September 1922 – 2 June 1996) was a Uruguayan painter and sculptor. She was best known for her abstract, gestural paintings and drawings from the 1960s, as well as for her political activism following the 1973 Uruguayan coup d'état. López's work first came to public attention in the 1960s after exhibitions in Montevideo and the United States, and she soon became an influential name in Uruguay's Informalism movement. López represented Uruguay in the São Paulo Art Biennial, and her work is part of the collection of the National Museum of Visual Arts in Uruguay.

== Biography ==
Hilda López was born in Montevideo on 27 September 1922. Her family settled in Mataojo, Lavalleja Department, to attend to her father's business.

In 1941, she entered the School of Plastic Arts of the Universidad del Trabajo in Montevideo, where she received painting lessons with Manuel Rosé and engraving with Guillermo Rodríguez. In 1952, she entered the workshop of Vicente Martín, and in 1958 she began to work with Lino Dinetto.

In 1946, she married Alberto Angenscheidt, and they had two children.

In 1960, López held her first solo exhibition at the Zaffaroni Gallery. From that moment on, she participated in numerous exhibitions and received awards for her works that became part of the country's public collections.

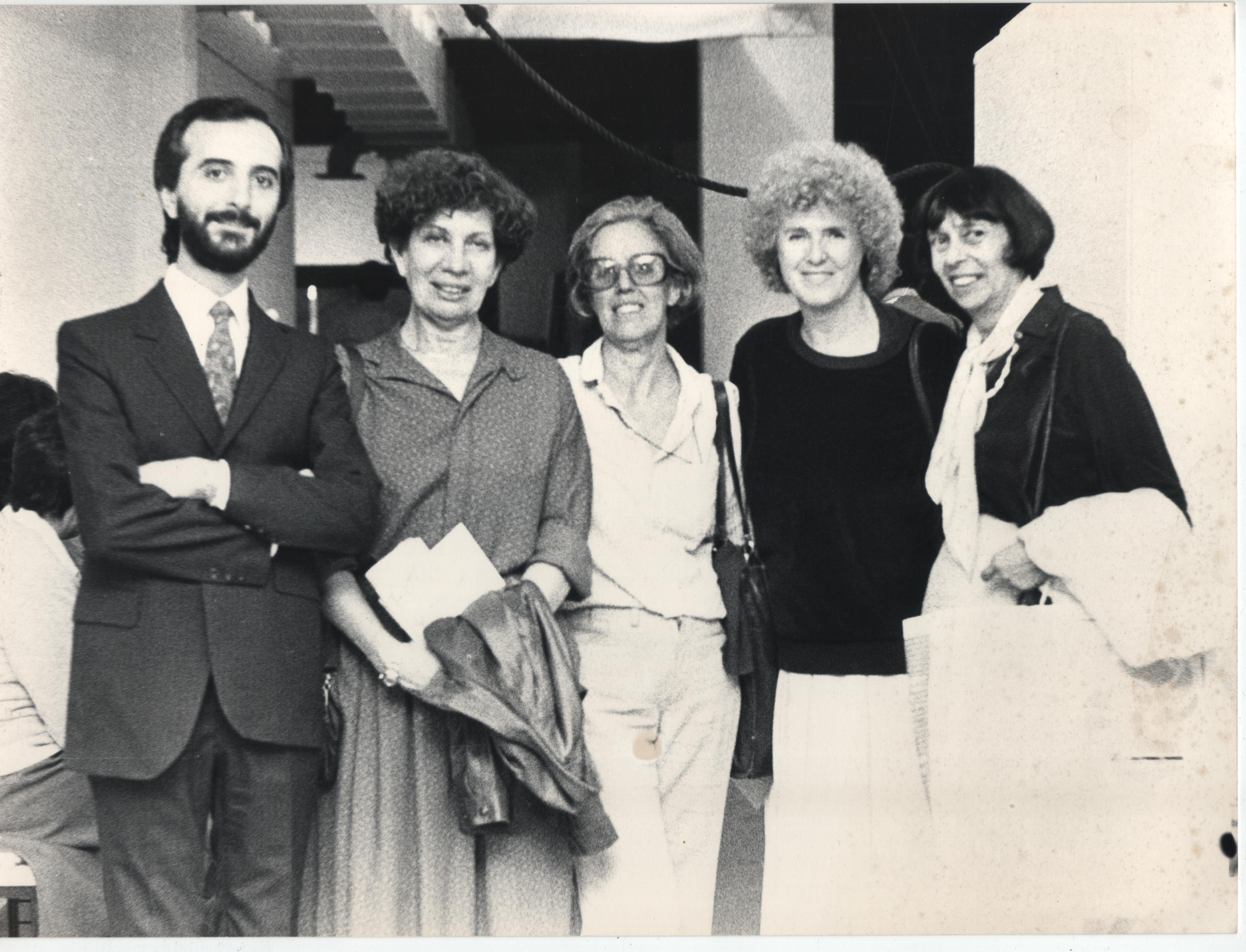
López, centre, surrounded by Ricardo Casas, Katusha Sánchez, Linda Kohen, and Eva Olivetti at Galería Cinemateca, 1993

Spanish sculptor Jorge Oteiza's presence in Montevideo had a great influence on her work. His theories about Romero Brest's vacuum aesthetics and informalism prompted López to develop her own plastic universe. Her series Streets and inlets of Montevideo exhibited in Washington in 1961, received a favorable critique from Frank Getlein in The Sunday Star.

In 1964, López traveled to Portugal accompanying an exhibition of Uruguayan artists. She remained there and had a relationship with the Portuguese painter Henriques Tavares. When the relationship ended, she returned to Montevideo.

In 1965, she provided the Uruguayan submission to the São Paulo Art Biennial. She participated in the occupation of the Municipal Subway in protest of the appointment of representatives of the Municipal Salon of Plastic Arts. In 1972, she participated in the reconstruction of Section 20 of the Communist Party in the Paso Molino neighbourhood.

In 1973, with the closure of official artistic training courses by the de facto government, López began to teach. Her workshop, as well as those of Guillermo Fernández, Nelson Ramos, and Hugo Longa, persevered in difficult times and influenced the next generation of Uruguayan artists, achieving the continuity of the national artistic process during the dictatorial period. In 1986, she made a mural in stone and cement in homage to the victims of the dictatorship at the Central Headquarters of the Communist Party of Uruguay.

She died in Montevideo on 2 June 1996.

== Work ==
The series created by the artist reflects difficult times in the life of her country. Grafías (1963) shows her dexterity and temperament in ink on paper. Retratos y Coral (1978) comprises works in oil and charcoal, portraits of friends and colleagues symbolically emblematic. Los Adioses (1978) shows abandoned suitcases that evoke the melancholy of the uprooting caused by exile. Pueblos (1981) denotes the human emptiness, and Campo (1983) the social hardships of the interior of the country. El problema principal es la pobreza (1988) rounds off a testimonial sequence of the painful period of the military dictatorship in her country.

The series, made in 1962 on large format canvases used planographic ink, filling in her creative intention through expressive gesture. The ambiguous character between figuration and abstraction recorded by her works generate evocative spaces of melancholy, uprooting, and reflection.

One of her best-known works, Autorretrato con golilla roja, made in 1978 and now part of the collection of the National Museum of Visual Arts, is defined in its expressive composition by the cutting red spot of the ruff, on the monochromatism of the figure. The symbolic climate of the work reflects the situation that her country was experiencing at that time. In the series Los Adioses and Pueblos, her informalist gestures are transformed into subtlety and line suggestion. Her work transits the border between figuration and abstraction, with a palette of coordinated colours, almost monochromatic, that alludes to oppression, jail, exile, and the fear to which Uruguayan society was subjected in times of dictatorship.

== Expositions ==
- 1959: 23rd National Salon and 11th Municipal Salon
- 1960: Individual exhibition at Galería Zaffaroni
- 1961: Arcobaleno Award, Punta del Este
- 1961: Instituto Di Tella, Buenos Aires
- 1961: Pan American Union, Chicago
- 1962: 1st Córdoba Biennial, Argentina
- 1962: Algunos pintores abstractos, Center of Arts and Letters
- 1963: Grafías 63, Amigos del Arte, Montevideo
- 1963: Joint exhibit with María Freire and Amalia Nieto at the Círculo de Bellas Artes
- 1964: 7 artistas de Uruguay, Galería Divulgaçao, Lisbon, Portugal
- 1965: São Paulo Art Biennial, Brazil
- 1965: Galería Sudarmericana, New York
- 1966: Uruguayan Center of Cultural Promotion, Galería de la Ciudadela, Montevideo
- 1967: Galería U, Montevideo
- 1969: Urbanismo, Galería Portón de San Pedro, Montevideo
- 1976: Galería Alcali, Montevideo
- 1978: Retratos, Alianza Francesa, Montevideo
- 1979: Los Adioses, Cinemateca Uruguaya
- 1981: Pueblos, Galería Latina, Montevideo
- 1983: Campo, Galería Latina, Montevideo
- 1988: Retrospective at Cátedra Alicia Goyena, Montevideo
- 1988: El problema principal es la pobreza, installation at Cinemateca Uruguaya
- 1991: Rostros, Rastros, Restos, Galería Latina, Montevideo

== Awards ==
- Acquisition Award, 12th Municipal Salon, Montevideo (1960)
- Acquisition Award, 13th Municipal Salon, Montevideo (1961)
- Acquisition Award, 14th Municipal Salon, Montevideo (1962)
- Acquisition Award, 15th Municipal Salon, Montevideo (1967)
