= Margaret Whyte =

Uruguayan artist (born 1940)

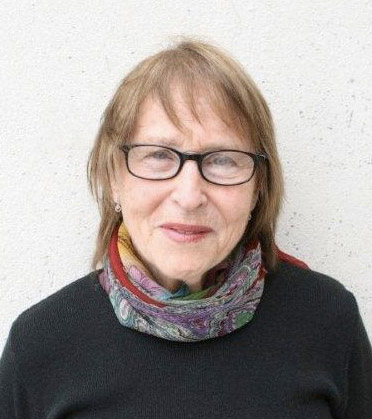
- Born: 21 February 1940 (age 86); Montevideo, Uruguay
- Occupation: Artist
- Years active: 1972–present
- Awards: Figari Award (2014)
- Website: www.margaretwhyte.com

Margaret Whyte (born 21 February 1940) is a Uruguayan visual artist.

== Career ==
Margaret Whyte began her artistic activity in 1972 at the Círculo de Bellas Artes in Montevideo. She studied with Clarel Neme, Jorge Damiani, Amalia Nieto, Rimer Cardillo, Hugo Longa, and Fernando López Lage. She has been a member of the Contemporary Art Foundation (FAC) since its inception.

Her work includes paintings, soft sculptures, installations, and interventions. Whyte evokes the memory of the materials she uses – fragments of dresses, tablecloths, and bedspreads bring an intense color to her textile works in which she questions the ideals of beauty and their rituals – as a way to revalue the aesthetic independent of the beautiful.

Her assemblages are accumulations and layers of cut and torn, wrapped, tied, and sewn objects which propose a reflection on the situation of women, beauty, fashion, and their commercial logic.

In 2014 she received the Figari Award in recognition of her career. The jury, composed of Olga Larnaudie, Lacy Duarte, and Enrique Aguerre, cited the extreme uniqueness of her works and the intergenerational reference that she represents in the Uruguayan art world.

== Exhibitions ==
- Pinturas, Museum of Contemporary Art (MAC), Montevideo, 1992
- Las cosas mismas, Juan Manuel Blanes Museum, Montevideo, 1995
- Misterios y ritos, Museo del Gaucho y la Moneda, Montevideo, 1996
- Cajas de Petri, Sala Vaz Ferreira, Montevideo, 1999
- Espacios medios, Molino de Pérez, Montevideo, 2001
- Cuerpos atávicos, Colección Engelman-Ost, 2003
- Hasta que duela, Cabildo de Montevideo, 2003
- Pliegues, Subte Exposition Center, 2007
- Kanga, intervention, CCE elevator, Montevideo, 2008
- Madame Butterfly, intervention, Solís Theatre staircase, Montevideo, 2009
- Belleza compulsiva, National Museum of Visual Arts, 2009
- Lo que queda, Contemporary Art Show, 2012
- Uruguayan pavilion, Biennale di Venezia, Venice

== Awards ==
- Acquisition Award, 39th National Salon of Plastic and Visual Arts, 1975
- Ministry of Tourism Award, 6th Spring Biennale, Salto, 1996
- Special and Acquisition Award, Centennial Painting Salon of the Banco República, 1997
- Spring Biennale Award, Salto, 1998
- Figari Award for Career, MEC-BCU, 2014
