= Delmira Agustini Medal =

Culture-related civil decoration of Uruguay

- Type: Civil decoration
- Awarded for: Exceptional contributions to culture or the arts
- Country: Uruguay
- Presented by: the Minister of Education and Culture
- Eligibility: Natural or legal citizens, foreign persons
- Motto: En reconocimiento a la contribución a la cultura y las artes. Ministerio de Educación y Cultura. República Oriental de Uruguay
- Status: Currently awarded
- Established: 4 January 2013
- First award: 21 August 2013
- Final award: 16 December 2021

Highlights
- Total: 40

The Delmira Agustini Medal is a civil decoration of Uruguay whose purpose is to honor those citizens, natural or legal, and foreign personalities who contribute or have contributed significantly to culture and the arts who, in the opinion of the Ministry of Education and Culture of Uruguay, deserve such recognition. The medal was created on 4 January 2013 and was named after Uruguayan poet Delmira Agustini.

== History ==
The Delmira Agustini Medal was created by Law No. 19,050 of 4 January 2013, which also put in charge of the Ministry of Education and Culture the decision of who will be awarded, to perform the presentation of the decoration and also ordered that the Executive Branch through the Ministry of Education and Culture regulate all other matters related to the medal.

Decree No. 123/013 of 23 April 2013 further regulated the aforementioned law.

== Appearance ==
The medal was named after poet Delmira Agustini. It is made of copper, minted on its obverse and engraved on its reverse with a cover of old silver. It is circular-shaped with a diameter of 40 millimeters and three millimeters of thickness. It is delivered in a case.

On its obverse it depicts a low relief engraving of the figure of Delmira Agustini, surrounded by an Art Nouveau decoration. On its reverse is engraved the text "En reconocimiento a la contribución a la cultura y las artes. Ministerio de Educación y Cultura. República Oriental del Uruguay" ("In recognition of the contribution to culture and the arts. Ministry of Education and Culture. Eastern Republic of Uruguay").

== Eligibility and appointment ==
The medal is awarded by the Minister of Education and Culture to citizens (natural or legal) as well as to foreigners who have notably contributed to culture and the arts in any of its aspects, which in the opinion of the Ministry of Education and Culture deserves the recognition.

The presentation is performed in an act, public or private, without having to comply with any formality or protocol other than that the recipient meets the requirements to be awarded and the person presenting the award is able to do so. After that, the Ministry of Education and Culture will register in the registry of the medal, managed by the National Directorate of Culture of this Ministry, who is being decorated with the medal.

== Recipients ==
Recipients	#
2013
Uruguay - Daniel Vidart	
Uruguay - Circe Maia
Uruguay - China Zorrilla
Uruguay - Nibia Mariño
France - Yamina Benguigui	
Uruguay - Cristina Peri Rossi
Italia - Eugenio Barba
United States - Glenn Close
South Africa - J. M. Coetzee
2014
Uruguay - Octavio Podestá	
Uruguay - Águeda Dicancro
Uruguay - Wilfredo Díaz Valdez
Uruguay - Hebe Rosa
Uruguay - Roberto Fontana
Uruguay - Estela Medina
Uruguay - Walter Reyno
Uruguay - Antonio "Taco" Larreta
Uruguay - Ruben Rada
Uruguay - Jaime Roos
Uruguay - Eduardo Galeano
Uruguay - Carlos Maggi
Uruguay - Benjamín Nahum
2015
Argentina - Julio Bocca	
Uruguay - Murga Comodines
2016
Uruguay - Enrique Iglesias	
2017
Uruguay - José María Obaldía	
Uruguay - Villanueva Cosse	
2019
Uruguay - Danilo Astori	
Uruguay - Ricardo Ramón Jarne
Uruguay - José "Pepe" Vázquez
Uruguay - Washington Carrasco	
Uruguay - Cristina Fernández
Uruguay - Linda Kohen	
Uruguay - Ida Vitale	
2020
Uruguay - María Julia Caamaño	
Uruguay - Thomas Lowy
Spain - Igor Yebra
2021
Uruguay - Lisa Block de Behar	
Uruguay - Beatriz Massons
Uruguay - Clara Ost	

== See also ==
- Orders, decorations, and medals of Uruguay
- Culture of Uruguay
