= Jorge Abbondanza =

- Born: Jorge Ramón Abbondanza Mendaro; March 6, 1936; Montevideo, Uruguay
- Died: August 28, 2020 (aged 84); Montevideo, Uruguay
- Education: Escuela Nacional de Bellas Artes
- Known for: Ceramics, sculpture, installation
- Awards: Premio Figari (1999)

Jorge Ramón Abbondanza Mendaro (6 March 1936 – 28 August 2020) was a Uruguayan journalist, art critic and visual artist. He wrote for the Montevideo newspaper El País for nearly five decades, covering film, theatre and the visual arts. He also worked as a ceramic artist in collaboration with Enrique Silveira.

== Journalism and criticism ==
Abbondanza was born in Montevideo on 6 March 1936. He studied drawing and painting at the Escuela Nacional de Bellas Artes and ceramics in the workshop of Enrique Silveira. He also attended the Faculty of Law at the University of the Republic.

He began his career as a film critic for the newspaper El Bien Público and later wrote for the weekly El Ciudadano. In 1965, he joined El País, where he wrote about film, theatre and the visual arts and for many years headed the newspaper's culture and entertainment section. He also wrote the column Señalero, which dealt with political, social and cultural subjects.

He was a member of the Uruguayan sections of the International Association of Theatre Critics and the International Association of Art Critics, as well as the Uruguayan Film Critics Association.

Abbondanza also published books on art and culture. He wrote a monograph on the Uruguayan painter Manuel Espínola Gómez, published in 1991, and El gran desfile (1996), a collection of his articles.

== Visual art ==
Alongside his work as a journalist and critic, Abbondanza pursued a career as a visual artist. He and Enrique Silveira began working together in 1957, initially experimenting with ceramic materials and glazes. From the 1970s, their work increasingly incorporated sculptural ceramic forms and installations. In 1964, they received a scholarship from the Instituto de Cultura Hispánica to travel to Spain.

Their work was exhibited in Uruguay and abroad, including at the Palazzo delle Esposizioni in Rome in 1964, the Smithsonian Institution in Washington, D.C., in 1966, exhibitions in Stuttgart and Berlin in 1982, the São Paulo Art Biennial in 1985 and the Tretyakov Gallery in Moscow in 1988.

In 1999, Abbondanza and Silveira received the Premio Figari from the Central Bank of Uruguay for their artistic career. Abbondanza also served several times as a juror for the award.

In 2017, the National Museum of Visual Arts presented Silveira y Abbondanza: un legado, an exhibition of their work following a donation by the artists to the museum. The following year, Abbondanza and Silveira were named Illustrious Citizens of Montevideo in recognition of their work in ceramics.

Abbondanza died in Montevideo on 28 August 2020, at the age of 84.

== Selected works ==
- Manuel Espínola Gómez (1991)
- El gran desfile (1996)
