= Fabini =

Fabini is an Italian surname. Notable people with the surname include:

- Eduardo Fabini (1882–1950), Uruguayan classical composer and musician
- Jason Fabini (born 1974), American football player
- Ricardo Fabini (born 1967), Uruguayan sailor

== See also ==
- 3645 Fabini, a main-belt asteroid
