= Alicia Haber =

Uruguayan historian, art critic, curator, and teacher

- Born: 21 October 1946 (age 79); Montevideo, Uruguay
- Education: Artigas Teachers' Institute
- Occupations: Historian, art critic, curator, teacher

Alicia Haber (born 21 October 1946) is a Uruguayan historian, art critic, curator, and teacher.

== Biography ==
A graduate of the Artigas Teachers' Institute, Alicia Haber took three Fulbright Scholarships in the United States, specializing in history and art criticism. She was the chief curator of the Department of Culture of the Municipality of Montevideo from 1988 to 2009. She was an art critic at the newspaper El País between 1982 and 2009. She has been director of the Virtual Museum of Arts (MUVA) of El País since its formation in 1996.

She has curated numerous exhibition projects for museums and cultural centers in her country and abroad. She was curator of the Uruguayan submission to the Biennial of Cuenca in 2001, and in 2005 was curator of Lacy Duarte's exhibition at the Venice Biennale. She is the author of numerous monographs and critical texts for publications, catalogs, and art books.

== Books ==
- Luis A. Solari: Máscaras todo el año, Editorial Linardi y Risso, Montevideo, 2003. ISBN 9974-559-36-7
- José Gurvich: Murales, esculturas y objetos, Fundación Gurvich, Montevideo, 2003. ISBN 978-9974-7778-0-4
- José Gurvich: Un canto a la vida, 1997. ISBN 978-9974-555-11-2
- Tola Invernizzi: el tiempo en que el arte se enfureció, Ed. Trilce, Montevideo, 2007. ISBN 978-9974-32-445-9
