= Solís de Mataojo =

- Town
- Location in Uruguay
- Coordinates: 34°36′0″S 55°28′0″W
- Country: Uruguay
- Department: Lavalleja Department

Population (2011)
  - Total: 2,825
- Time zone: UTC -3
- Postal code: 30100
- Dial plan: +598 4447 (+4 digits)

Solís de Mataojo is a small town in the southwest edge of the Lavalleja Department of southern Uruguay.

== Geography ==
The town is located on Km. 83 of Route 8. The stream Arroyo Solís Grande flows along the southeast limits of the town.

== History ==
It was created as a "Pueblo" (village) by Decree of 12 August 1874. Its status was elevated to "Villa" (town) category on 15 October 1963 by decree Ley N° 13.167.

== Population ==
In 2011, Solís de Mataojo had a population of 2,825.

Year	Population
1908	8,302
1963	1,919
1975	1,750
1985	2,052
1996	2,509
2004	2,676
2011	2,825

Source: Instituto Nacional de Estadística de Uruguay

== Places of worship ==
- Our Lady of Mt. Carmel Parish Church (Roman Catholic)

== Notable people ==
- Eduardo Fabini, composer and musician
- Manuel Espínola Gómez, painter
- Juan Capagorry, illustrator and writer
