= Daniel Viglietti =

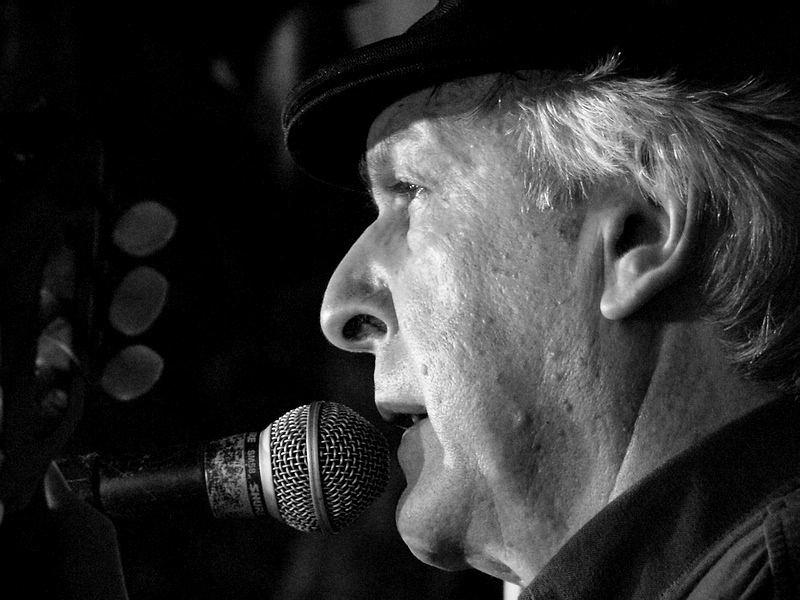

Background information
- Born: Daniel Alberto Viglietti Indart; 24 July 1939; Montevideo, Uruguay
- Died: 30 October 2017 (aged 78) Montevideo, Uruguay
- Genres: Folk music, Nueva canción
- Occupation: Musician
- Instruments: Guitar, vocals
- Years active: 1963–2017

Daniel Alberto Viglietti Indart (24 July 1939 – 30 October 2017) was a Uruguayan folk singer, guitarist, composer, and political activist. He was one of the main exponents of Uruguayan popular song and also of the Nueva Canción or "New Song" of the 1960s and early 1970s.

== Career ==
He founded, in 1971, along with other musicians like José "Pepe" Guerra, Braulio López, the music scholar Coriún Aharonián, Myriam Dibarboure, María Teresa Sande and Notary Public Edgardo Bello, the recognized independent record label Ayuí/Tacuabé in order to promote and support valuable Uruguayan musical expressions.

He performed the works of Cuban Nueva Trova stars Silvio Rodríguez and Pablo Milanés and Brazil's Chico Buarque and Edu Lobo, worked with Cuban composer and arranger Leo Brouwer. His recordings are widely available, especially "Trópicos" (1972).

Viglietti was imprisoned in 1972 by his own government. He was supported by the likes of Jean-Paul Sartre as an international man of conscience, a voice for peace, and an opponent of the military dictatorships that plagued South America in the 1970s. Rumors about possible mistreatment against him forced the authorities to bring him out in front of television cameras to show that, in particular, his hands were fine. However, Viglietti spoke out that his treatment in police custody was much better than what other political prisoners received. He was a peer of the late Chilean poet and folk singer Victor Jara and composer and activist Violeta Parra.

== Discography ==
- Canciones folklóricas y 6 impresiones para canto y guitarra (Antar PLP 5024. 1963)
- Hombres de nuestra tierra (junto al narrador Juan Capagorry. Antar PLP 5045. 1964)
- Canciones para el hombre nuevo (Orfeo. 1968)
- Canto libre (Orfeo ULP 90.537. 1970)
- Canciones chuecas (Orfeo ULP 90.558. 1971)
- Trópicos (Orfeo. 1973)
- En vivo (Le Chant du Monde. 1978)
- Trabajo de hormiga (Music Hall. 1984)
- Por ellos canto (Orfeo. 1984)
- A dos voces (junto a Mario Benedetti. Orfeo. 1985)
- A dos voces (junto a Mario Benedetti. Orfeo. 1987)
- Esdrújulo (Orfeo, 1993)
- A dos voces volúmenes 1 y 2 (junto a Mario Benedetti. Orfeo CDO 047–2. 1994)
- Devenir (Ayuí / Tacuabé, 2004)
- Nuestra bandera / Esta canción nombra (Orfeo)

=== Reeditions and recompilations ===
- A desalambrar (EMI 16584. 1970)
- Canciones con fundamento (Diapason DP-99330)
- Seis impresiones para canto y guitarra (Ayuí / Tacuabé am26cd)
- Hombres de nuestra tierra (con Juan Capagorry. Ayuí / Tacuabé am28cd)
- Canto libre (Ayuí / Tacuabé am34cd)
- Canciones para el hombre nuevo (Ayuí / Tacuabé am35cd)
- Canciones chuecas (Ayuí / Tacuabé ae212cd. 1999)
- Trópicos (Ayuí / Tacuabé ae226cd)
- A dos voces (con Mario Benedetti. Ayuí / Tacuabé ae238cd)
- Esdrújulo (Ayuí / Tacuabé ae312cd)
- Trabajo de hormiga (Ayuí / Tacuabé ae334cd. 2008)
