= Clever Lara =

Uruguayan artist, teacher, and curator

- Born: 26 November 1952 (age 73); Rivera, Uruguay
- Education: Edgardo Ribeiro workshop
- Occupations: Plastic artist, painter
- Awards: Figari Award (2001)

Clever Lara (born 26 November 1952) is a Uruguayan plastic artist, teacher, and curator.

He made his first studies of painting in his hometown of Rivera with the master Osmar Santos. From 1964 to 1968 he attended the Edgardo Ribeiro workshop in Montevideo. Between 1975 and 1979 he taught at the Institute of Fine Arts San Francisco de Asís. He then set up his own teaching workshop in Montevideo, where he has trained many artists, a task that he continues with today.

In 1983 he received a Guggenheim Fellowship, with which he studied metal engraving in New York and Valdottavo-Luca, Italy, with Luis Camnitzer. He represented his country at the Venice Biennale in 1986 and at the São Paulo Biennial in 1981 and 1994 and received numerous national and international awards.

In 1988, Lara was distinguished by the Fund for Artists Colonies, United States, and in 2001 he received the Figari Award in recognition of his career.

== Work ==
Lara's work is in a naturalist style – large canvases in which the paint drips and fades into the margins, creating an aura of dreamlike unreality. He composes still lifes in which he integrates various recovered objects such as broken dolls, cardboard, wool balls, belts of pre-Columbian fabrics, boards, and brooms. He configures his creations with abandoned trivial objects, generating a reflective look at human waste.
