= Juan Capagorry =

Uruguayan columnist, illustrator, writer and poet

Juan Capagorry (1934–1997) was a Uruguayan columnist, illustrator, writer and poet. He was born in 1934 in Montevideo and died on June 12, 1997. He was also a storyteller, and his voice was recorded on various phonograms.

== Biography ==
His childhood and adolescence were spent in the town of Solís de Mataojo in the Lavalleja department. Because of this he was considered a native of that place.

Early in the 1960s he began interacting with the singer, Daniel Viglietti, with whom he created the album Hombres de nuestra tierra (Men of our land). the songs of which consisted entirely of lyrics written by Capagorry and performed by Viglietti. For the recording of this album, which also featured other introductory lyrics by Capagorry, he moved to Montevideo, where he lived with Viglietti.

== Literary works ==
- Hombres y oficios (cuentos con ilustraciones de Eduardo Amestoy, Ramón Carballal, Rosa Cazhur y Joaquín Aroztegui. Grupo Toledo Chico. 1966) - (Men and occupations - stories with illustrations by Eduardo Amestoy, Ramón Carballal, Rosa Cazhur and Joaquín Aroztegui)
- La visita y nueve cuentos más (cuentos. Ediciones Hoy. Minas. 1967) - (The visit and nine more stories)
- La vida, juguete roto (poesía. Ediciones de la Balanza. 1976) - (Life, a broken toy - Poetry)
- Chau, consuelo y otros cuentos (cuentos. Arca. 1979) - (Chau, comfort and other stories)
- El juego es cosa seria (crónicas. Arca. 1979) - (The game is serious)
- Aquí se canta: canto popular 1977-1980 (ensayo en coautoría con Elbio Rodríguez Barilari. Arca. 1980) - (It's sung here: folk song - essay coauthored with Elbio Rodríguez Barilari)
- Chirolitas (cuentos. Arca. 1984)
- La murga: antología y notas (ensayo en coautoría con N. Domínguez. Prisma. 1984) - (Murga: anthology and notes - essay coauthored with N. Domínguez)
- A puro cuento (cuentos. Arca. 1989) - (Just a story)
- En el pueblo de Andaverlo (cuentos para niños. Ediciones Monteverde. 1993) - (In the village of Andaverlo - stories for children)

== Discography ==
- Hombres de nuestra tierra (junto a Daniel Viglietti. Primera edición del sello Antar. 1964) - (Men of our land with Daniel Viglietti)
- Capagorry cuenta a los niños (Ayuí / Tacuabé a/s1. 1971) - (Capagorry tells stories to children)
- Guitarra Negra (álbum de Alfredo Zitarrosa con participación de Capagorry en el tema "Hoy desde aquí". Orfeo SULP 90774. 1985) - (Black Guitar - album with Alfred Zitarrosa with participation from Capagorry on the theme from now on)
