= Octavio Podestá =

Uruguayan sculptor (born 1929)

Octavio Podesta
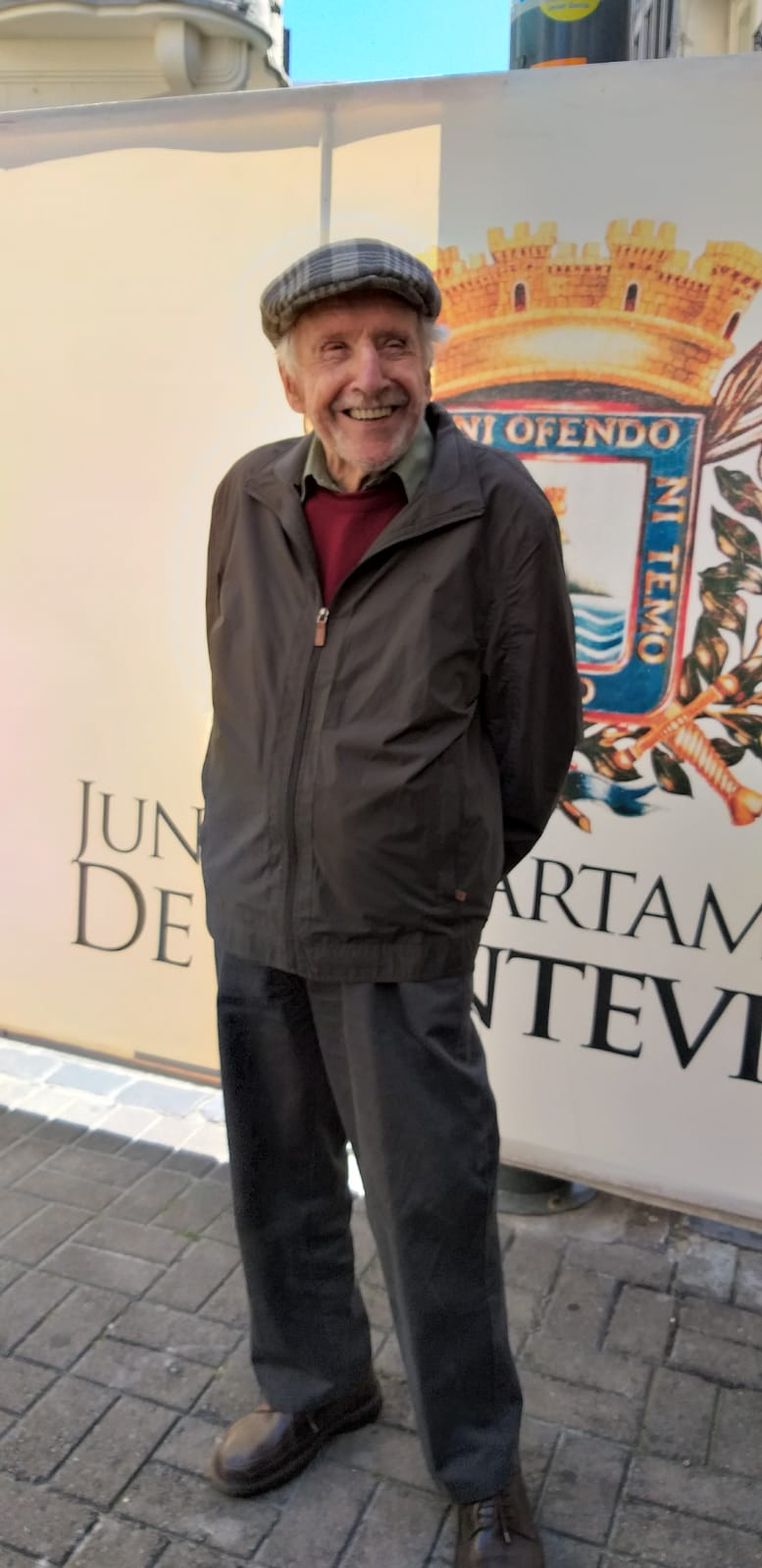
- Octavio Podesta at the unveiling of his tile on the Paseo de los Soles, Peatonal Sarandi, Montevideo, Uruguay 2020.
- Born: 19 April 1929 (age 97); Montevideo, Uruguay
- Children: 3 (including Aldo Podesta)
- Awards: Illustrious Citizen of Montevideo; Delmira Agustini Medal; Premio Morosolli

Octavio Podesta (born 19 April 1929) is a Uruguayan sculptor.

Born in Montevideo, Podesta graduated from the National School of Fine Arts at the University of the Republic in 1961, where he studied drawing and sculpture with Juan Martin and Severino Pose. He continued learning to sculpt in France, Italy, and Lebanon. In 1964, he won the Carlos María Herrera municipal scholarship, which he used to travel to Europe to study at the Beaux-Arts de Paris.

== Career ==
Podesta's work is often composed of wood and metal, often preferring to use byproducts of other sculptures.

=== Awards ===
- Illustrious Citizen of Montevideo, 2003
- Delmira Agustini Medal, 2014

=== Gallery ===
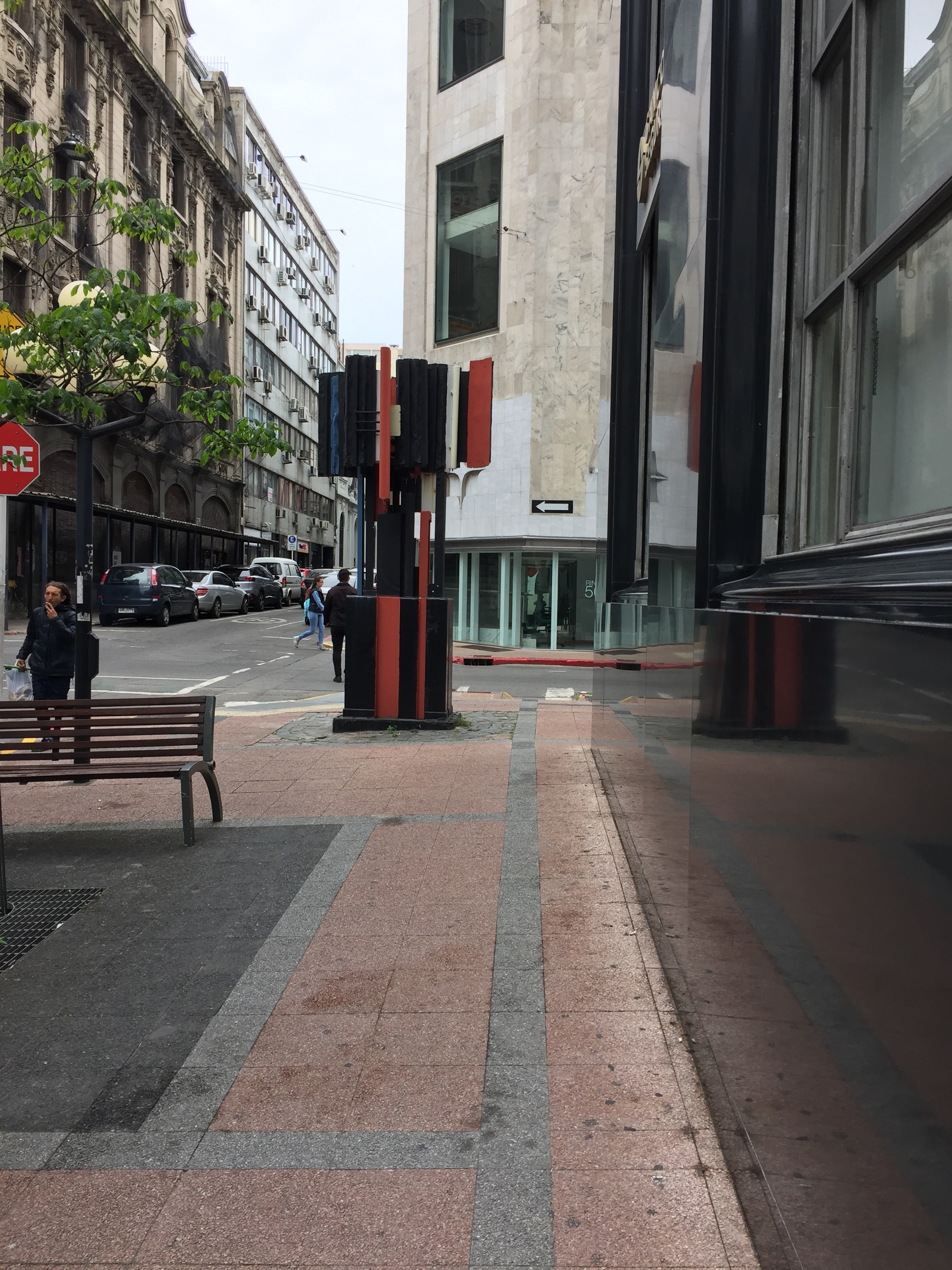
Metal sculpture titles "Eutrapelia," by Octavio Podesta on the corner of 33rd Street and Rincon Street in the Old City of Montevideo, Uruguay

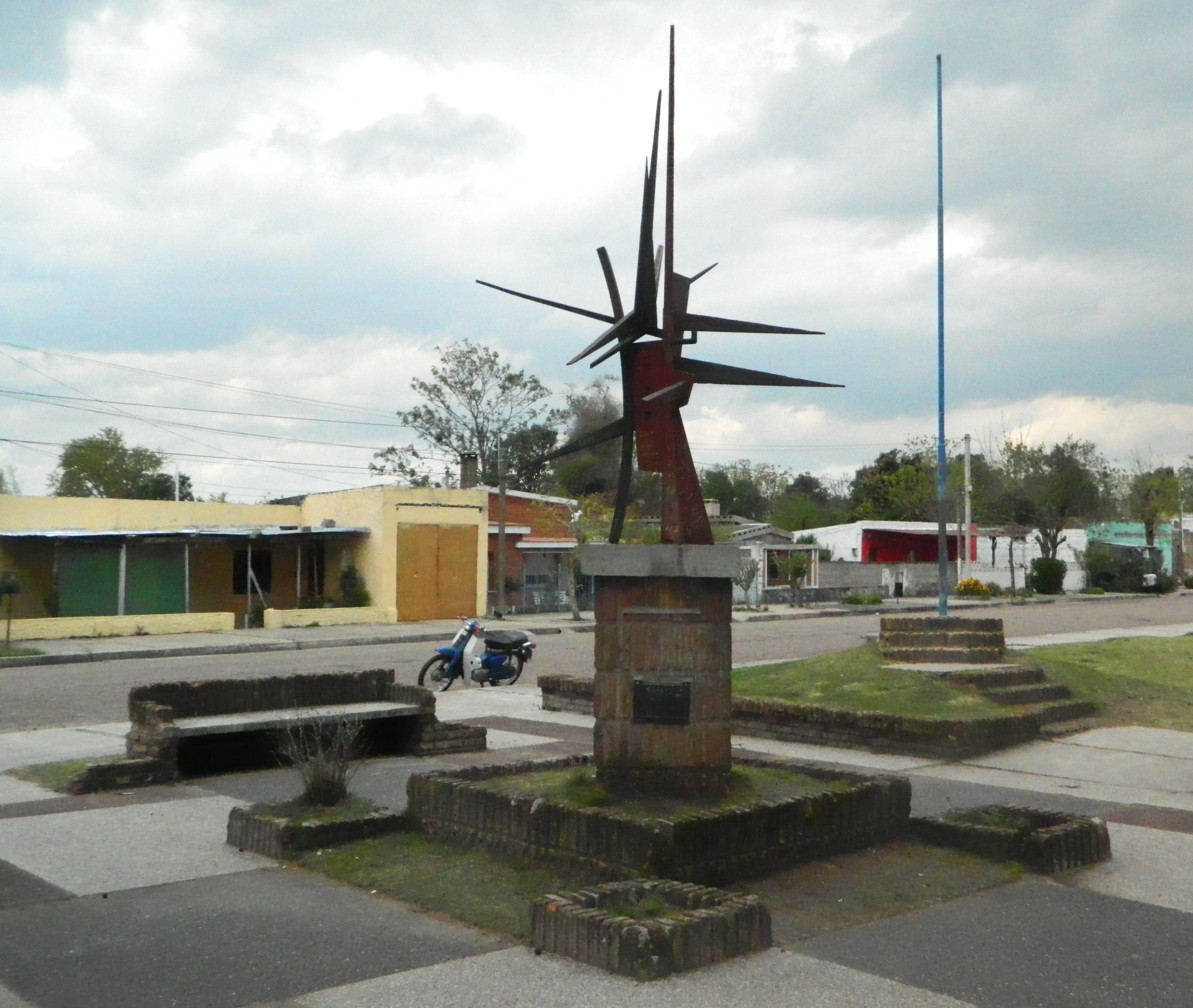
Sculpture by Octavio Podesta at the Plaza Levratto in the Rio Negro Department of Uruguay

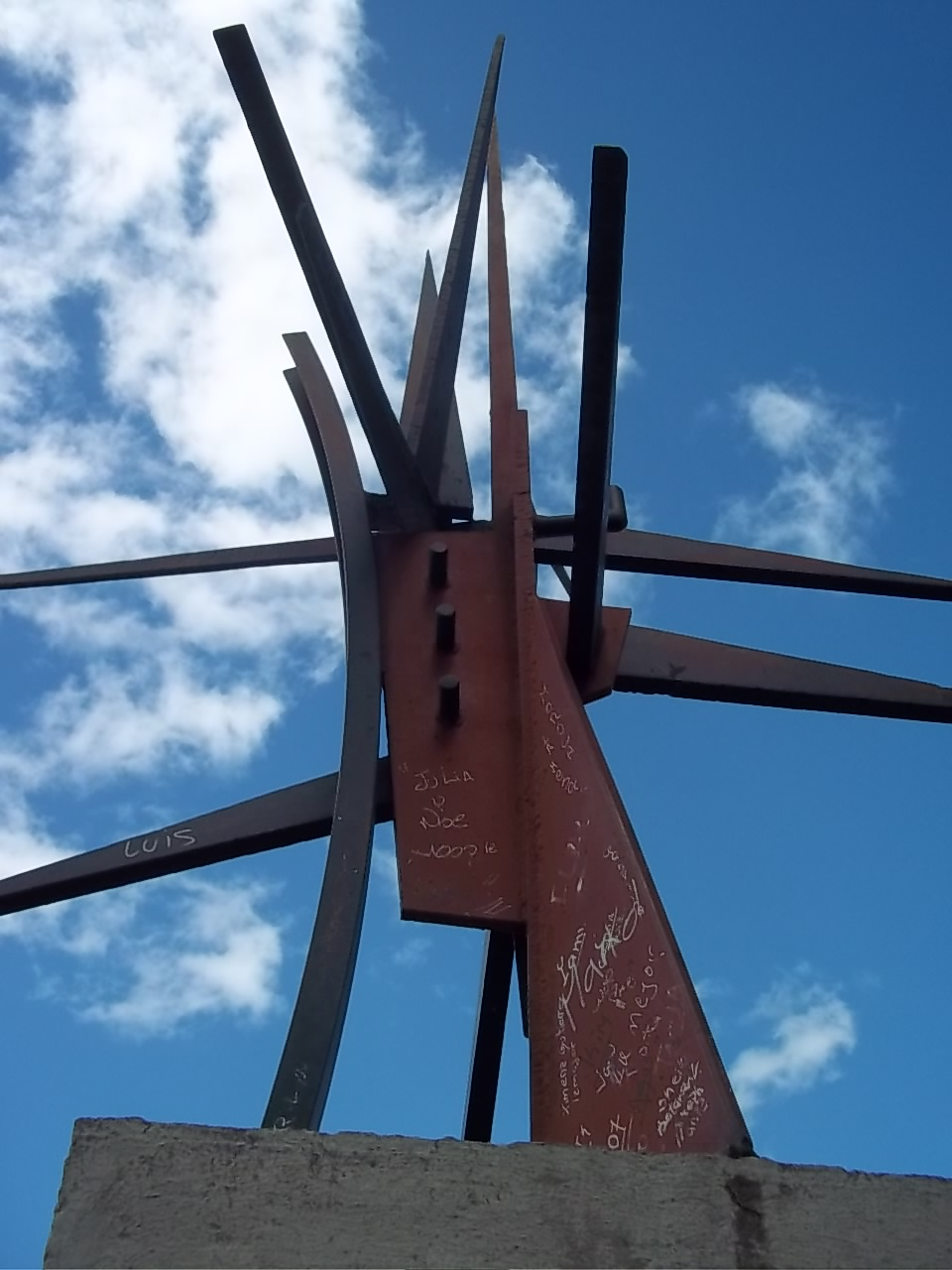
Sculpture to Eduardo Levratto by Octavio Podesta. Located in the Rio Negro Department of Uruguay.

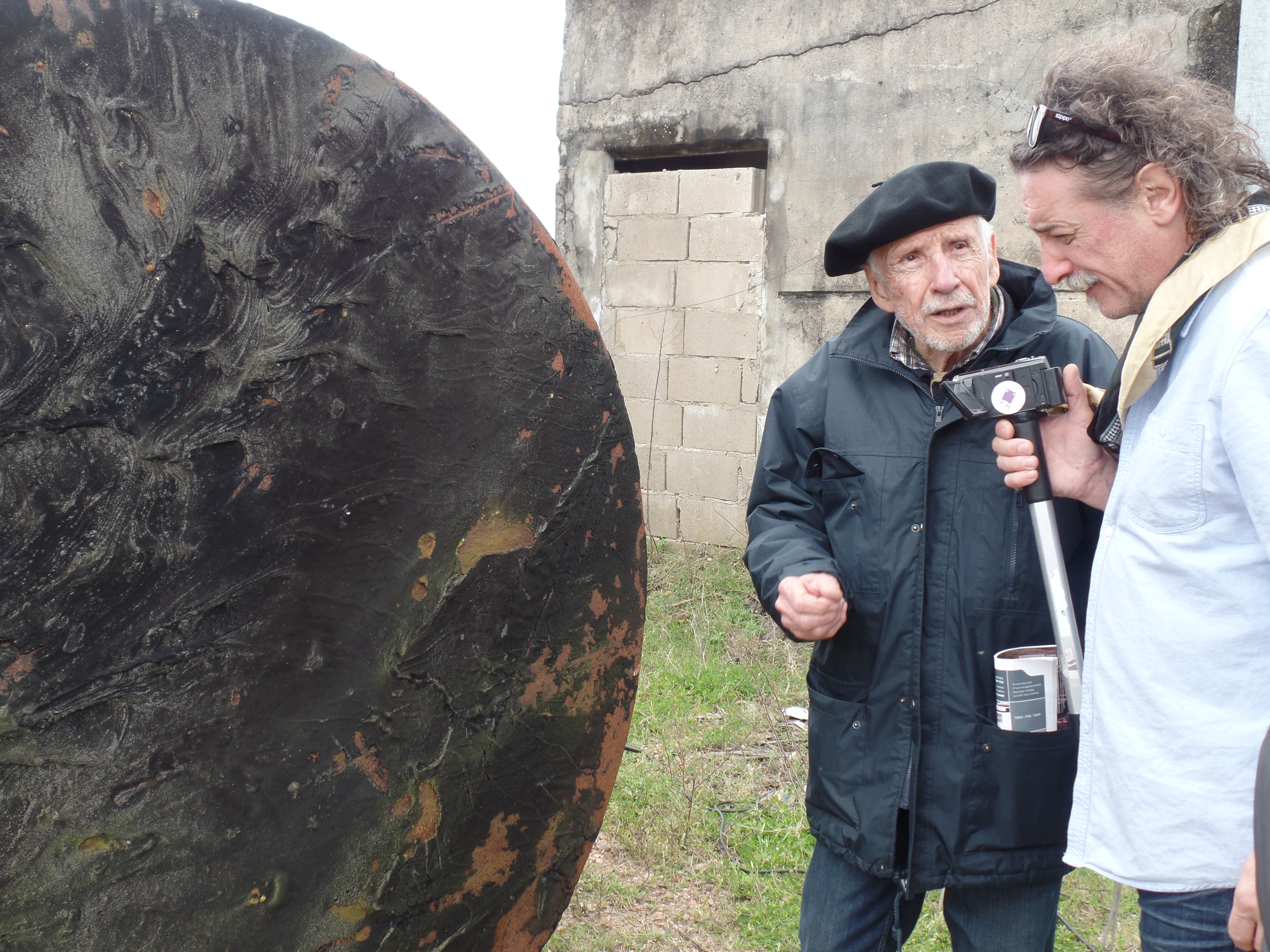
Pincho Casanova interviewing Octavio Podesta
