= Luis Cluzeau Mortet =

- Born: Luis Cluzeau Mortet; November 16, 1888; Uruguay
- Died: September 28, 1957 (aged 68)
- Genres: Musical nationalism
- Occupations: Musician, Composer, Director and Professor
- Instrument: Violin
- Website: Orquesta Sinfónica del SODRE

Luis Cluzeau Mortet (November 16, 1888 – 28 September 1957) was a Uruguayan composer and musician.

== Life ==
Cluzeau Mortet, along with Alfonso Broqua, Eduardo Fabini and Vicente Ascone, a representative of the nationalist tendency that emerged in Uruguayan music in the 1910s and 20s.

He played first violin for Ossodre (SODRE Symphony Orchestra) from 1931 until 1946 but had to step down due to a hearing affliction.

As a composer, his most recognized work was for piano, song and piano and symphonic music. He wrote for the symphony orchestra several pieces of music, including, Rancherío, Poema Nativo, Llanuras, Soledad Campestre, La Siesta, Preludio y Danza and Sinfonía Artigas. He also wrote "El Quinielero" and "Gimiendo", two famous tangos recorded by Carlos Gardel. His masterpiece was Carreta Quemada, done in 1916.

He was a high school teacher and also named Honorary Choir Director for the National Institute for the Blind.

Mortet's grandfather was the French-Uruguayan composer and pianist Pablo (Paul) Faget.
