= Ricardo Pascale =

Uruguayan economist, professor, and sculptor (1942–2024)

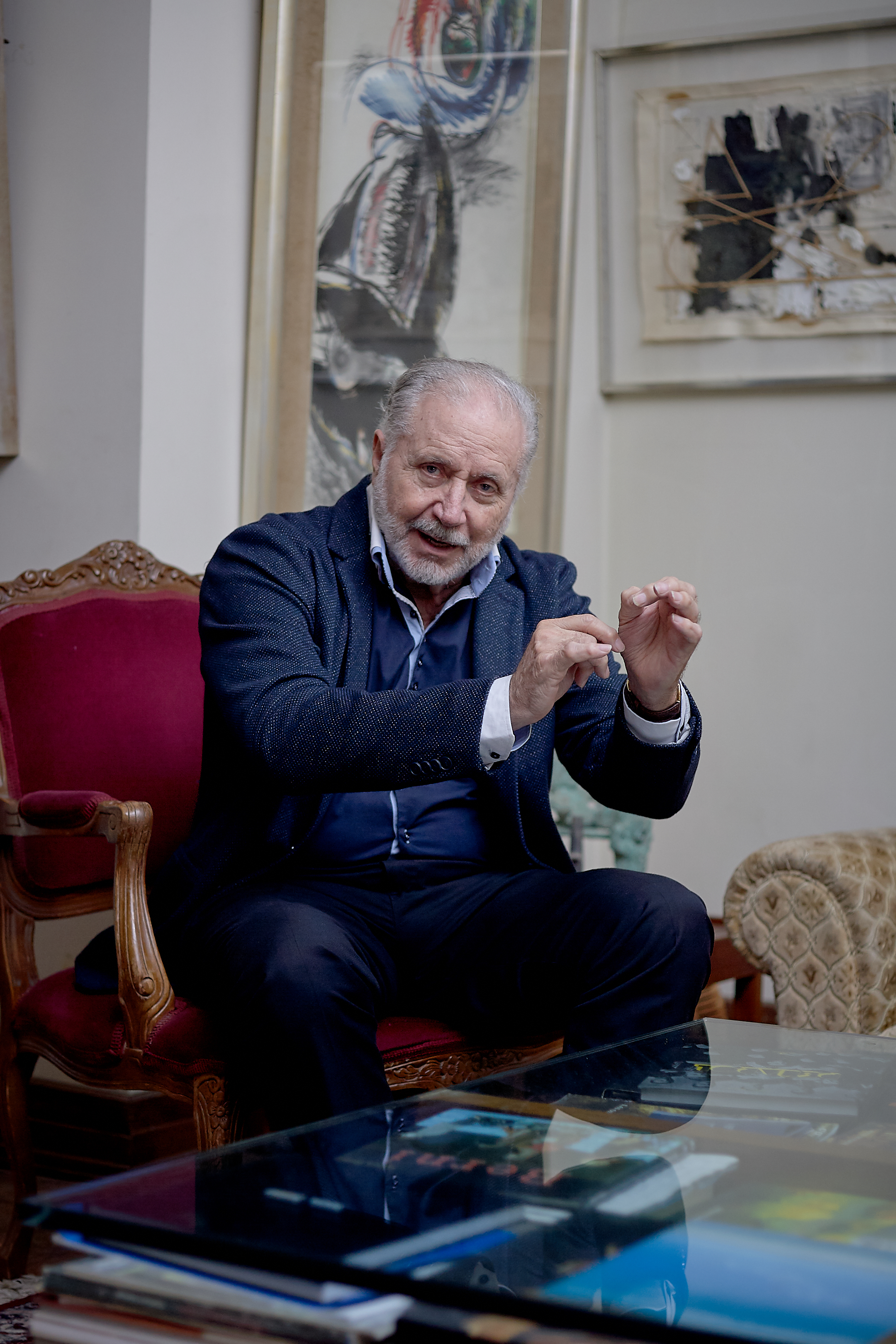
- Born: Ricardo Pascale Cavalieri; 29 August 1942; Montevideo, Uruguay
- Died: 26 January 2024 (aged 81)
- Education: University of the Republic (Uruguay); University of California, Los Angeles; Open University of Catalonia
- Occupations: Economist, sculptor
- Website: ricardopascaleart.com

Ricardo Pascale Cavalieri (29 August 1942 – 26 January 2024) was a Uruguayan economist, professor, and sculptor.

== Biography ==
A man close to the Colorado Party, he chaired the Central Bank of Uruguay from 1985 to 1990 and from 1995 to 1996, during both governments of Julio María Sanguinetti.

Pascale was a notable sculptor. A disciple of Nelson Ramos, Alfredo Testoni, and Manuel Espínola, he exhibited his work in various countries. Further, he contributed to the establishment of the Figari Award and represented Uruguay at the 1999 Venice Biennale and was the commissioner of Uruguay's pavilion at the 2015 edition of the event.

Pascale died on 26 January 2024, at the age of 81.
