= Luis Camnitzer =

German-born Uruguayan artist, curator, art critic and academic

- Born: November 6, 1937 (age 88); Lübeck, Germany
- Education: University of the Republic
- Employer: State University of New York
- Movement: Conceptual art
- Spouse(s): Liliana Porter (1965-1979); Selby Hickey (1979)
- Awards: Premio Figari; Premio Konex

Luis Camnitzer (born 6 November 1937) is a German-born Uruguayan artist, curator, art critic, and academic who was at the forefront of 1960s Conceptual Art. Camnitzer works primarily in sculpture, printmaking, and installation, exploring topics such as repression, institutional critique, and social justice.

== Early life and education ==
Luis Camnitzer was born in Lübeck, Germany in 1937 and moved to Montevideo, Uruguay in 1939. In 1953, he studied at the University of the Republic Escuela Nacional de Bellas Artes, where he concentrated on sculpture and architecture. In 1957, Camnitzer received a grant from the German government to study at Akademie der Bildenden Künste München At the Akademie, Camnitzer was mentored by sculptor Heinrich Kirchner.

== Career and Practice ==
In 1960 Camnitzer held his first solo exhibition at the Centro de Artes y Letras Montevideo and the following year began teaching at the Escuela Nacional de Bellas Artes. Camnitzer subsequently moved from Montevideo to New York City in 1964. In New York, he and fellow artists Liliana Porter and José Guillermo Castillo founded the New York Graphic Workshop (1964–1970), a studio focused on redefining the medium of printmaking and dedicated to reviving its importance as a contemporary art form. Concurrent to his practice with the New York Graphic Workshop, Camnitzer produced foundational works that explored the reflexive relationships between the viewer and artwork by means of language, such as This Is a Mirror, You Are a Written Sentence (1966–68). Beginning in the late 1960s and evolving into the 1970s and 80s, his practice also expanded to examine socio-political issues, including the oppression and cruelty of military dictatorships in Latin America. As an example, his work Leftovers (1970) consists of 80 stacked boxes, stained with fake blood and wrapped with surgical bandages, alluding to state-sanctioned violence and repression during dictatorship. Also in this period, Camnitzer produced a series of "object-boxes" in which ordinary items were placed inside wood-framed glass boxes with textually descriptive brass plaques. Infusing the material approach of the object-boxes with political content, Camnitzer produced one of his most important works, the Uruguayan Torture Series (1983–84). This series of photo-etchings emphasizes the artist's interest in combining socio-political critique with the psychological implications of text and images. Since the 1980s Camnitzer has produced installations and site-specific works, such as A Museum is a School (2009–present), in addition to his continuing practice in printmaking. In 2018 a retrospective exhibition, Luis Camnitzer: Hospicio Para Utopias Fallidas, opened at Museo Reina Sofia.

In 2024, Camnitzer's work was included in Every Sound Is a Shape of Time, a collections-focused group exhibition at the Pérez Art Museum Miami, Florida, curated by Franklin Sirmans. Luiz Camnitzer work is placed next to Jennie C. Jones, Alfredo Jaar, and Lawrence Weiner, among others.

== Themes ==
Since the 1960s, Camnitzer has focused on political subjects including identity, language, freedom, ethics, and historical tragedy. As Jane Farver discusses, "conceptual in nature, [Camnitzer's] work is powerful and evocative; it is often humorous, and sometimes deeply disturbing. Always, he challenges and implicates the viewer"

== Personal life ==
Camnitzer is a Uruguayan citizen. He lives and works in Great Neck, New York and taught at SUNY Old Westbury, where he is currently professor emeritus. Camnitzer has written several books, including New Art of Cuba (1994) and Conceptualism in Latin American Art: Didactics of Liberation (2007). He is represented by Alexander Gray Associates.

== Representation in public collections ==
- ARCO Corporation, New York, NY
- Biblioteca Communale, Milan, Italy
- Bibliothèque Nationale, Paris, France
- Blanton Museum of Art, University of Texas, Austin, TX
- Cabinet of Drawings and Prints of the Uffizzi, Florence, Italy
- Casa de las Américas, Havana, Cuba
- Centro Galego de Arte Contemporánea, Santiago de Compostela, Spain
- Centro Wifredo Lam, Havana, Cuba
- Colby College Museum of Art, Waterville, ME
- Colección Patrica Phelps de Cisneros, Caracas, Venezuela/New York, NY
- Daros-Latinaamerica, Zürich, Switzerland
- Fonds Régional d’Art Contemporain de Lorraine, France
- Israel Museum, Jerusalem, Israel
- J. Paul Getty Museum, Los Angeles, CA
- The Jewish Museum, New York, NY
- Library of Jerusalem, Israel
- Malmö Stad, Sweden
- Metropolitan Museum of Art, New York, NY
- Museo de Arte Contemporáneo de Castilla y León, León, Spain
- Museo de Arte Latinoamericano de Buenos Aires, Argentina
- Museo de Arte Moderno, Bogotá, Colombia
- Museo de Arte Moderno, Buenos Aires, Argentina
- Museo de Arte Moderno, Cartagena, Colombia
- Museo de Arte y Diseño Contemporáneo, San José, Costa Rica
- Museo de Artes Plásticas, Montevideo, Uruguay
- Museo de Bellas Artes, Caracas, Venezuela
- Museo de Gráfica y Dibujo Latinoamericano, Roldanillo, Colombia
- El Museo del Barrio, New York, NY
- Museo del Grabado, Buenos Aires, Argentina
- Museo La Tertulia, Cali, Colombia
- Museo Nacional Centro de Arte Reina Sofía, Madrid, Spain
- Museo Nacional de Artes Visuales, Montevideo, Uruguay
- Museo Nacional de Bellas Artes, Havana, Cuba
- Museo Nacional de Bellas Artes, Santiago, Chile
- Museo Universitario de Arte Contemporáneo, Mexico City, Mexico
- Museu de Arte Contemporânea da Universidad de São Paulo, Brazil
- Museum Lodz, Łódź, Poland
- Museum of Contemporary Art, Skopje, Republic of Macedonia
- Museum of Contemporary Graphic Art, Fredrikstad, Norway
- Museum of Fine Arts, Houston, TX
- The Museum of Modern Art, New York, NY
- Museum Wiesbaden, Germany
- National Museum of Modern Art, Baghdad, Iraq
- The New York Public Library, New York, NY
- Pérez Art Museum Miami, FL
- Queens Museum, New York, NY
- São Paulo Museum of Art, Brazil
- Smithsonian American Art Museum, Washington, DC
- Snite Museum, Notre Dame University, South Bend, IN
- Solomon R. Guggenheim Museum, New York
- Tate Modern, London, United Kingdom
- Walker Art Center, Minneapolis, MN
- Whitney Museum of American Art, New York, NY
- Yeshiva University, New York, NY

== Awards and recognition ==
- 2014 Premio Anuale de Literature 2014, Ensayo de Arte, Ministry of Education and Culture, Uruguay
- 2012 United States Artists Ford Fellow, Visual Arts John Jones Art on Paper Award, Art Dubai: Skowhegan Medal for Conceptual & Interdisciplinary Practices
- 2011 Frank Jewett Mather Award, College Art Association
- 2002 Konex Mercosur Award for Uruguay
- 1998 Latin American Art Critic of the Year Award, Argentine Association of Art Critics
- 1996 First Prize, ES96, Tijuana Salón Internacional de Estandartes
- 1991 Art Matters Foundation
- 1982 Guggenheim Fellowship for Visual Art
- 1978 Creative Arts Program Services for Sculpture
- 1974 Prize, British International Print Biennial
- 1970 Prize, Biennial de San Juan del Grabado Latinoamericano, San Juan, Puerto Rico
- 1968 Purchase Prize, Museum of Trenton, New Jersey
- 1965 Memorial Foundation for Jewish Culture
- 1961 Guggenheim Fellowship for Creative Printmaking
