= Rimer Cardillo =

Engraver and artist from Uruguay

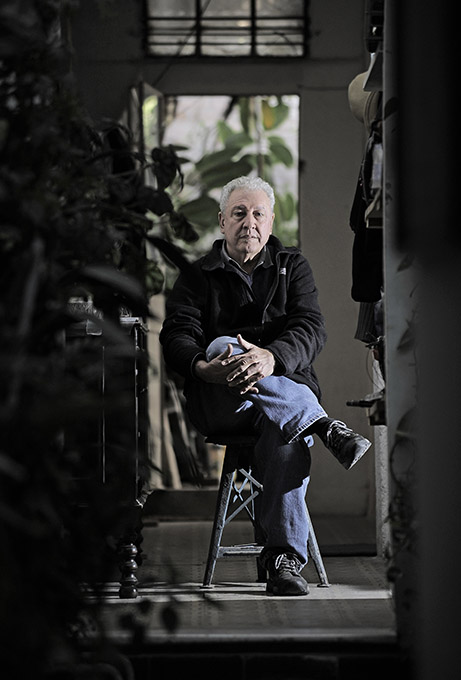
- Born: 17 August 1944 (age 82); Montevideo, Uruguay
- Education: National Institute of Fine Arts
- Occupations: Plastic artist, engraver
- Awards: Guggenheim Fellowship; Figari Award; Wings Award
- Website: www.rimercardillo.com

Rimer Cardillo (born 17 August 1944) is a Uruguayan visual artist and engraver of extensive international experience who has lived in the United States since 1979.

== Biography ==
Rimer Cardillo graduated from the National Institute of Fine Arts of Uruguay in 1968. He completed postgraduate studies in East Germany at the Weißensee School of Art and Architecture in Berlin and at the Leipzig School of Graphic Art between 1969 and 1971.

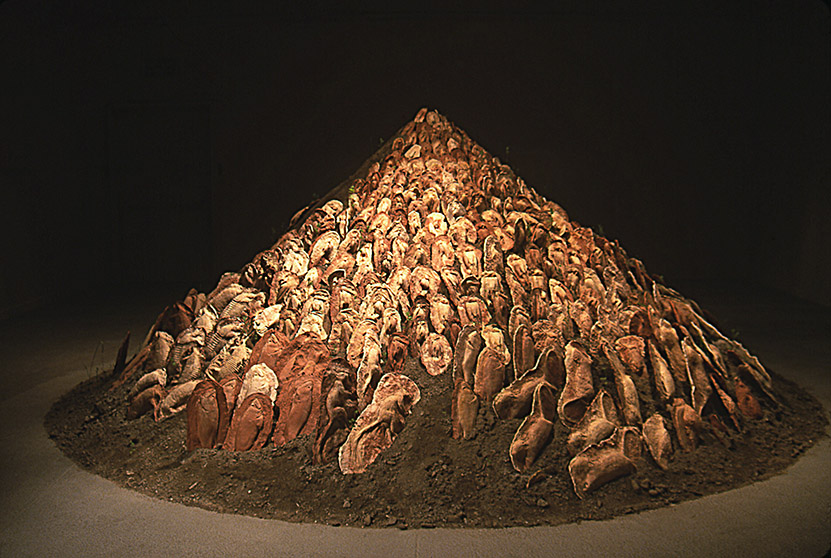
Cupí degli Uccelli, Uruguay pavilion at the Venice Biennale, 2001

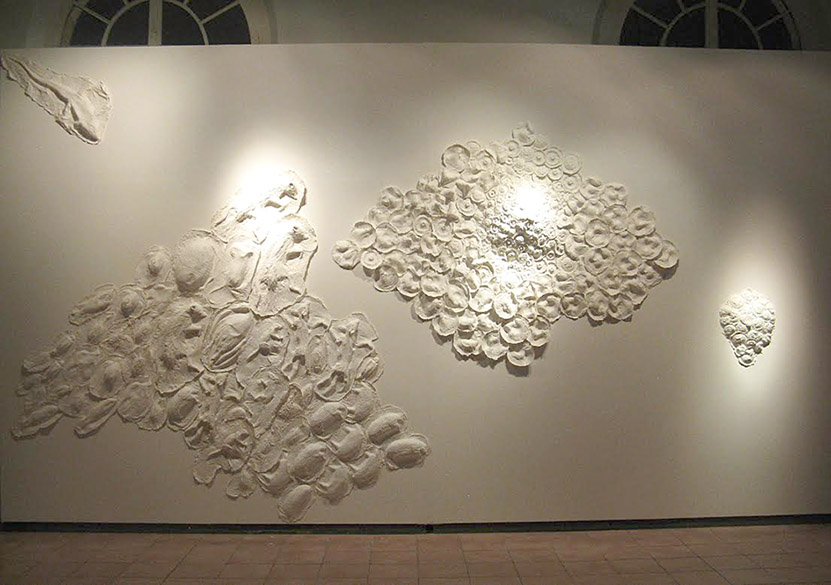
Anacahuita, la pimienta de los pobres, installation, Fernando García Ponce Museum, México, 2014

Teaching work has been present in his artistic career since the 1970s in the Montevideo Engraving Club and several workshops in Uruguay and the United States. He has been a teacher of artists who have managed to develop solid personal careers such as Gladys Afamado, Margaret Whyte, and Marco Maggi. He conducts training workshops on graphic techniques in Montevideo every year, as well as curating exhibitions in Uruguay and abroad, in the quest to revalue engraving as a creative discipline and a platform for contemporary expression for the new generations of artists in his country.

He is a tenured professor at the State University of New York at New Paltz, where he is responsible for the direction of the graphic arts department.

In 1997 he was awarded a Guggenheim Fellowship. In 2001 he represented Uruguay at the Venice Biennale. In 2002 he received the Figari Award in recognition of his career. In 2004 he was awarded the Chancellor's Award and the Prize for Artistic and Scientific Research. He exhibited at the Binghamton University Art Museum (2013) and the Medieval Trinitarian Templespace of the Kiscell Museum, Budapest, Hungary (2010), among other outstanding museums and galleries in various countries.

In 2003 he was invited by the Tate Modern in London to give a conference and present a video about his creations. In 2004 the Samuel Dorsky Art Museum of SUNY New Paltz organized the first retrospective of Cardillo's work. In 2011, the Nassau County Museum of Art in Long Island held the retrospective exhibition "Jornadas de la memoria", which included works by the artist over four decades.

== Work ==
Cardillo has developed a varied series of works that include engravings, sculptures, and installations, where the study of nature and the preservation of his imprint have always been present. His sculptures and installations evoke archaeological sites that revalue the pre-Hispanic imaginary of Uruguayan territory with aesthetic representations - symbols of funerary mounds that allow recreating the collective memory, as well as the artist's metaphorical return to his native land. His fascination with the primitive is also reflected in much of his graphic work, as well as an archeology of natural life in the transfer of forms of animals and plants that resemble fossils made of metal, ceramic, or paper, which reinforce the idea of permanence of culture beyond life and point to the intense trace of the ancestral and the recovery of the past.

His work is held by numerous public and private collections, including the Art Institute of Chicago, Bibliothèque nationale de France, Cincinnati Art Museum, Instituto Nacional de Bellas Artes y Literatura of Mexico, Museo de Bellas Artes and Museum of Contemporary Art in Caracas, New York Museum of Modern Art, Art Museum of the Americas in Washington, Allen Memorial Art Museum at Oberlin College in Ohio, and the National Museum of Visual Arts of Montevideo, the garden of which became home to his 1991 sculpture Barca de la crucifixión in 2005, Taubman Museum of Art of Roanoke, Virginia in 2024
