= Manuel Espínola Gómez =

- Manuel Espínola Gómez
- Born: July 5, 1921; Solís de Mataojo, Lavalleja Department, Uruguay
- Died: May 10, 2003 (aged 81); Montevideo, Uruguay
- Education: Self-taught
- Known for: Painting, graphic design, scenography
- Notable work: Bolívar (Una interrogación americana?) (1983), CNT and Frente Amplio logos
- Style: Figurative, surrealism, abstraction
- Movement: Modern Uruguayan art
- Awards: Premio Blanes (1954), Gran Premio del Salón Nacional de Bellas Artes (1962), Premio Figari (2000)

Manuel Espínola Gómez (5 July 1921 – 10 May 2003) was a Uruguayan painter, scenographer, and graphic designer, considered a significant figure in 20th-century Uruguayan visual art. His work often combined formal innovation with social and political content, and he played a prominent role in shaping national visual identity through painting, design, and institutional projects.

== Early life and artistic beginnings ==
Espínola Gómez was born in Solís de Mataojo, Lavalleja Department, Uruguay, in 1921. As a teenager, he was encouraged to pursue art by composer Eduardo Fabini, a neighbor and fellow native of his hometown. In 1946, he moved to Montevideo, where he began formal artistic work and quickly gained visibility in the national scene.

In 1949, he co-founded the group Carlos F. Sáez with artists Luis A. Solari, Washington Barcala, and Juan Ventayol, which held its first group exhibition in the same year.

== Career and major work ==
Espínola Gómez was known for his ability to blend realism, surrealism, and abstraction, and for addressing themes such as political struggle, Latin American identity, and memory. He participated in key international exhibitions, representing Uruguay at the São Paulo Biennials (1957, 1959, 1961) and the Venice Biennale in 1966.

Among his most emblematic paintings are:

- Espirales trágicas (1961)
- Variaciones sobre el gordo Améndola (1961)
- Bolívar (Una interrogación americana?) (1983)

Beyond his easel work, Espínola Gómez was also active in graphic design, scenography, and public art. He designed the original logos for the Convención Nacional de Trabajadores (CNT) and the Frente Amplio political coalition, both of which became iconic symbols in Uruguayan political history.

He also collaborated with state institutions, including the restoration of the Anchorena Presidential Estate and the remodeling of the Edificio Independencia (formerly Palacio Estévez) alongside architect Rubén Benech in 1987.

== Awards and recognition ==
Espínola Gómez received several prestigious awards during his lifetime, including:

- Premio Blanes (1954)
- Gran Premio del Salón Nacional de Bellas Artes (1962)
- Premio Figari (2000)

== Retrospectives and legacy ==
In 2021, the Museo Nacional de Artes Visuales (MNAV) in Montevideo held a retrospective titled El mirador cavante, curated by Oscar Larroca, in commemoration of the artist's centennial. The exhibition highlighted both his artistic and civic contributions, exploring his connection with political memory, collective identity, and aesthetic experimentation.

Espínola Gómez died in Montevideo on 10 May 2003 at the age of 81.
