= Magali Herrera =

Uruguayan painter (1914–1992)

- Born: 1914; Rivera, Uruguay
- Died: 1992 (aged 77–78)
- Known for: Painting; Drawing
- Movement: Art brut; Outsider art
- Patrons: Jean Dubuffet

Magali Herrera (1914–1992) was a Uruguayan self taught artist who wrote, danced, acted and made films in addition to producing the oeuvre of paintings of Utopias, for which she is known.

== Life ==
Magali Herrera was born in 1914 in Rivera, Uruguay to a notable local family. She was an autodidact who worked in a variety of media prior to creating the visual works for which she is known. She was a precocious writer of poems and stories, which were never published, and also wrote for several daily papers, working as a journalist. She enjoyed organizing poetry evenings and befriended well known Uruguayan poet Juana de Ibarbourou. She began painting intermittently in the early 1950s but it wasn't until 1965, after a period of severe depression, that she began to paint regularly. This activity became central to her existence with periods of intense creative work during which she would paint day and night. Depression, occasionally so intense that it resulted in suicide attempts, continued to plague her and in 1992 she took her own life.

== Collections and exhibits ==
Magali Herrera's work is primarily held in the Collection de l'Art Brut museum in Lausanne, Switzerland. Her works have been featured in Collection de l'Art Brut exhibitions including a 1996 retrospective and the Art Brut Biennial II: Architectures, in 2015 for which an accompanying catalog of the exhibition Architecture: Art Brut the Collection, published by 5 Continents Editions, was produced A selection of her work was presented by Galerie Christian Berst at the 2010 Art Paris. In 2015 her work was included in the exhibition Le Cahier Dessiné at the Halle Saint-Pierre in Paris. In 2025 the Museum Gugging in Austria presented an extensive exhibition with over 80 works of the Uruguayan artist and also featured her correspondence with Jean Dubuffet.

== Recognition ==
In 1967, while traveling with her husband, she completed two drawings in Paris which she took to show, renowned painter and patron of many Art Brut creators, Jean Dubuffet, leaving her work with his secretary. Dubuffet immediately bought the works. Dubuffet's interest led to other purchases: the director of Plaisir de France, Claude Fregnac, bought two pieces and author Michel Tapié acquired work as well.
