= Leonilda González =

Uruguayan painter and engraver (1923–2017)

- Born: 2 February 1923; Minuano, Colonia Department, Uruguay
- Died: 4 January 2017 (aged 93); Montevideo, Uruguay
- Education: National Institute of Fine Arts
- Spouse: Carlos Fossatti
- Awards: Figari Award (2006)

Leonilda González (2 February 1923 – 4 January 2017) was a Uruguayan painter and engraver, founder of the Montevideo Engraving Club. Her work is represented in the Juan Manuel Blanes Museum and the National Museum of Visual Arts, as well as in private collections in Uruguay and other countries. In 2006 she was recognized with the Figari Award for her career.

== Biography ==
In 1943 Leonilda González entered the National Institute of Fine Arts, where she trained with Miguel Ángel Pareja, Ricardo Aguerre, and José María Pagani. In 1949 she was sent to Europe on an official mission to continue her training in Paris, with André Lhote and Fernand Léger.

She was married to Carlos Fossatti, also an engraver and member of the Engraving Club, for six years.

González frequently participated in the salons of the Montevideo Engraving Club and in the collective exhibitions of the Union of Contemporary Plastic Artists. She exhibited her work individually both nationally and internationally, in Buenos Aires, Havana, Panama, Puerto Rico, Brazil, and elsewhere. She contacted graphic artists from socialist countries, and was a delegate at the Intergrafik Graphic Arts Symposium in Berlin in 1967.

During her career she received several recognitions and distinctions, including: Municipality of Montevideo Acquisition Award in 1957 and 1967, "El Mundo" Award of the first Latin American woodcut contest at the Plastic Gallery of Buenos Aires, First Woodcut Prize granted by Casa de las Américas in Havana, El Galpón Prize (theater) for her woodcut Novias revolucionarias, III, among others. In 2006 she received the Figari Award as an integral recognition of her career, exhibiting at the Sala Figari in the Ciudad Vieja and editing a catalog of the exhibition.

González excelled in drawing, painting, and woodcut, a technique on which she held numerous courses and workshops, although due to vision problems, she devoted herself in later years to the technique of pastel, but without ceasing to teach the woodcut technique at her private workshop in Montevideo.

Her work is mostly figurative, often costumbrista, developing various themes in the form of a series, such as the "Novias revolucionarias". This began in 1968 as a manifesto of ironic protest against marriage conceived as a loss of freedom, and in the era of dictatorship, became a symbol of protest on behalf of the loved ones of prisoners, exiles, and the disappeared.

Her woodcuts are compiled in the book Títeres, and in the 1994 book Esta soy yo she published her autobiography. Later, in 2011, she published a second autobiographical book, La carpeta negra, where she recounted her life during exile.

Leonilda González died in Montevideo on 4 January 2017 at age 93.

== Montevideo Engraving Club ==
In 1953, together with Nicolás Loureiro, Susana Turiansky and other artists, Leonilda González founded the Montevideo Engraving Club, in order to disseminate and democratize access to art through graphic techniques that allow reproducing works in large print runs at low cost. González worked as a woodcut teacher and actively participated in the editions, exhibitions, and engraving shows of this entity, of which she was a member of the board of directors from 1953 until she left the country during the civic-military dictatorship in 1976. During her exile, between 1976 and 1986, she settled first in Peru and then in Mexico, representing the Engraving Club abroad in her travels through various countries of Latin America.
