= Jorge Damiani =

- Born: 6 november 1931; Nervi, Italia
- Died: January 26, 2017 (aged 85); Uruguay
- Education: Accademia di Belle Arti di Brera
- Occupations: Painting, drawing, engraving
- Style: Metaphysical realism, Classicism
- Movement: Modern Uruguayan art
- Awards: Premio Figari

Jorge Damiani (6 november 1931 – 26 January 2017) was a Uruguayan visual artist known for his work in painting, drawing, and engraving. He was awarded a Guggenheim Fellowship in 1959, and again in 1960. Some of his works were exhibited at the Museum of Modern Art, New York in the late 1960s.
