= Gladys Afamado =

Uruguayan painter (1925–2024)

- Born: 24 May 1925; Montevideo, Uruguay
- Died: 29 December 2024 (aged 99)
- Occupations: Artist, writer, poet
- Relatives: Ethel Afamado (sister)
- Awards: Morosoli Award; Figari Award (2008)

Gladys Afamado (24 May 1925 – 29 December 2024) was a Uruguayan visual artist, engraver, and poet. A member of the Montevideo Engraving Club since 1954, she has contributed to many of its monthly editions and almanacs. She later ventured into different plastic artforms, and in recent years has been recognized for her work in digital art.

== Life and career ==
Gladys Afamado was born in Montevideo on 24 May 1925. She was the second of five children of Isaac Isidoro Afamado, a Jewish immigrant based in Montevideo, and his wife Julia, the daughter of Italian immigrants, born in Dolores, Soriano. Afamado attended public school, and in her home she received an open and free education, in which art, letters, and music were encouraged. His sister Ethel Afamado has had a distinguished career in music and poetry.

She received artistic training with Adolfo Pastor and Domingo Bazzurro at the Círculo de Bellas Artes and at the National School of Fine Arts between 1940 and 1950. Later she took ceramics courses with Duncan Quintela and screen printing with Rimer Cardillo. She studied semiotics with Jorge Medina Vidal and literature with Jorge Arbeleche.

From 1945 to 1950 she studied violin with Beatriz Tusset, and in 1951 and 1952 she participated in the "Anfión" chamber orchestra directed by Tusset.

The 1974 almanac of the Montevideo Engraving Club, titled Canción con todos, with Gladys Afamado's cover, was censored and removed from circulation by the de facto government.

In 1984, she traveled to Spain on a competitive scholarship, where she attended a paper craft course in Capellades, with Laurence Barker and Frederic Amat, material that she would later use in her works.

In 1986, she took a postgraduate course in metal engraving at the National Museum of Visual Arts, taught by David Finkbeiner of the State University of New York at Purchase.

Afamado's work is known for female figures with large eyes that look directly at the viewer, characteristic of the stage of the editions of the Montevideo Engraving Club.

In 2016, the National Museum of Visual Arts organized an anthological exhibition of her work, curated by María Eugenia Grau.

Afamado died on 29 December 2024, at the age of 99.

== Awards ==
- First Prize for Engraving, National Salon of Fine Arts, Uruguay, 1966
- First Prize, Salon of the Montevideo Engraving Club, 1966
- 2nd Prize, Concurso Almanaque FUNSA, Uruguay, 1969
- Salon of Illustrated Poems Award, Montevideo, 1969
- National Graphic Arts Competition Award, Montevideo, 1974, 1975, 1976, 1977
- Honorable Mention, 5th National Graphic Arts Competition, 1978
- 5th Prize for Drawing, BROU Salon, Montevideo, 1980
- Award for Engraving, Salon of San José, Uruguay, 1980
- AFE Award, Salon of San José, Uruguay, 1981
- Award for Engraving, Biennial of Salto, Uruguay, 1981
- Biennial Award for Hispanoamerican Engraving, MAC, Montevideo, 1983
- Honorable Mention, BID, Punta del Este, Uruguay, 1985
- 4th Prize, BROU Painting Salon, Montevideo, 1984
- First Prize (6 equal) Almanaque INCA, Montevideo, 1986
- Honorable Mention, Municipal Salon, Montevideo, 1986
- Award, Fray Bentos Drawing and Engraving Salon, Uruguay, 1986
- Award for Engraving, 2nd Plastic Arts Salon of Soriano, Uruguay, 1988
- Acquisition Award, Mini-Print of Cadaqués, Spain, 1989
- 2nd Prize, BROU Engraving and Watercolor Salon, Montevideo, 1989
- Miró Award, for yearlong artistic work, Maldonado, Uruguay, 1991
- Mention, BROU Plastic Arts Salon, Montevideo, 1998
- Morosoli Award for Engraving, Minas, Uruguay, 2000
- Diploma of Honor: "Ateneo del Grabado" Award, 2004
- Second Prize "Mosto & Rojas" Digital Art International, Argentina, 2005
- Figari Award in recognition of her career, 2008
- Honoree at the 60th National Prize for Visual Arts, which will take place at the Contemporary Art Space (EAC) in December 2022.

=== Poetic work ===
- Casa de las Américas Prize Mention, Havana, Cuba, 1968
- 2nd Poetry Prize, Casa del Poeta Latinoamericano, Montevideo, 1979
- First Prize, Unpublished Poetry, Club Banco de Seguros, for the book El perejil y sus adyacencias, 1983
- First Prize, International Biennial of Short Poetry, Valparaíso, Chile, 1983
- Special Mention, unpublished book of poetry, No espero respuesta, Casa de Cultura del PCU, Montevideo, 1987
- Mention, Annual Municipal Art Competition of Montevideo, for published book of poetry No espero respuesta, 1989
- First Prize, published book of poetry No espero respuesta, Ministry of Education and Culture, 1989
- First Prize, unpublished book of poetry En la casa de la espera, Ministry of Education and Culture, 1995
- Mention, published book of poetry En la casa de la Espera, Ministry of Education and Culture, 1998

== Published books ==
- Signos vitales (Collection of Today's Poets), Ed. Géminis, 1978
- No Espero Respuesta, Ed. Signos, 1989
- En la casa de la espera, 1997
- Por los siglos de los siglos, Ed. Graffiti, 1995
