= Amalia Nieto =

Uruguayan painter and sculptor

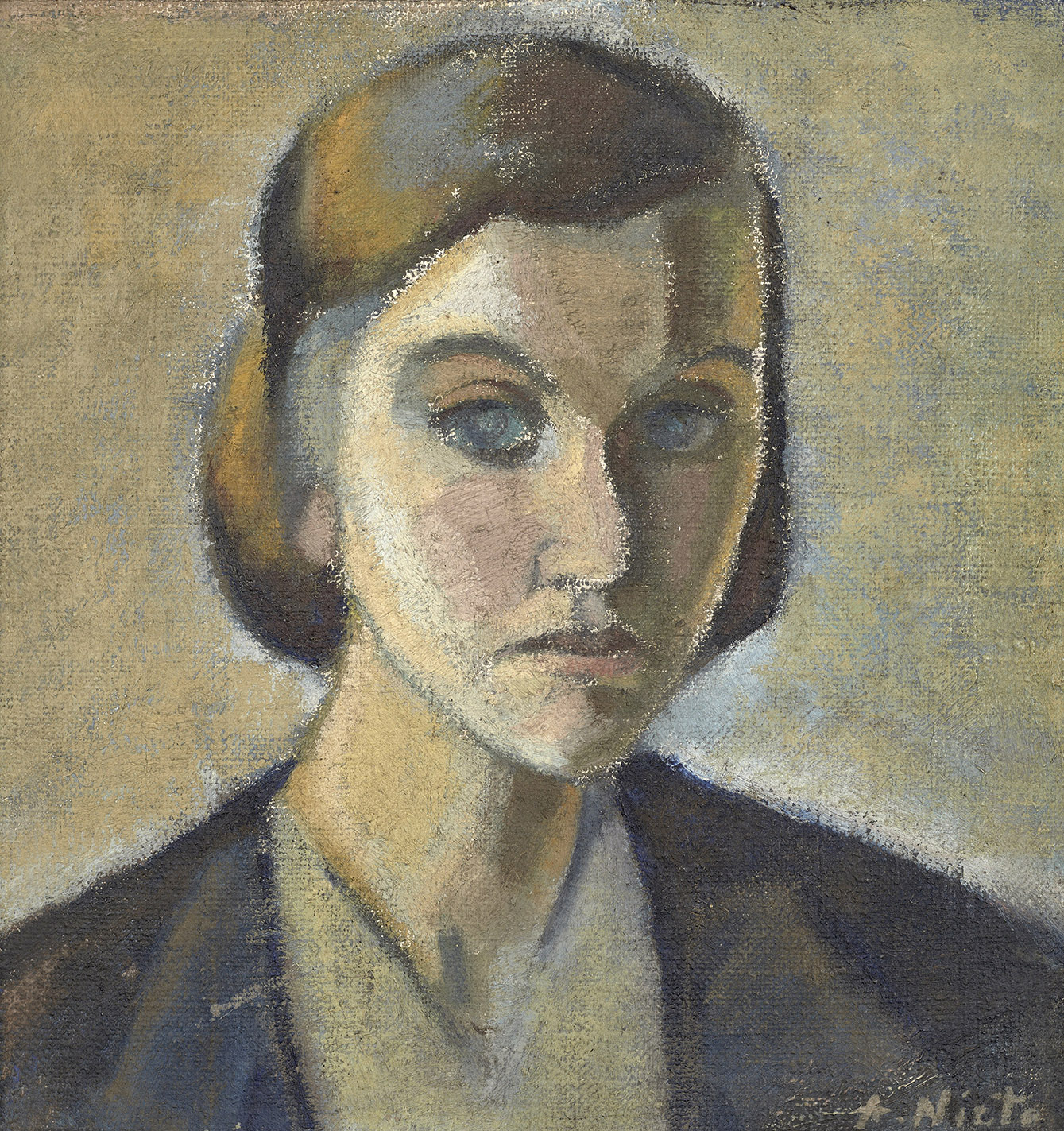
- Selfportrait, 1930
- Born: María Amalia Nieto Perichón; 3 August 1907; Montevideo, Uruguay
- Died: 7 February 2003 (aged 95); Montevideo, Uruguay
- Occupations: Painter, sculptor, engraver
- Spouse: Felisberto Hernández (1937–1943)
- Parents: Manuel Benito Nieto (father); Ángela Perichón (mother)
- Awards: Figari Award; Premio Candelabro de Oro

Amalia Nieto (3 August 1907 – 7 February 2003) was a Uruguayan painter, engraver, and sculptor. She was a member of the Constructive Art Association led by Joaquín Torres-García and creator of her own style that stands out in Uruguayan art of the 20th century.

== Biography ==
The daughter of Ángela Perichón and cardiac surgery pioneer Dr. Manuel Benito Nieto, Amalia Nieto was the second of three children.

In 1925 she entered the Círculo de Bellas Artes and started painting with Domingo Bazzurro. In 1929 she traveled to Paris, where she spent three years studying at the Grande Chaumière with Othon Friesz and at the André Lhote Academy. She also attended a course in art history at the Sorbonne. In 1923 she visited Pedro Figari at his Parisian studio and showed him some of her paintings. Upon her return to Uruguay she held her first solo exhibition.

In 1934, Nieto entered the Taller Torres García art school, and the following year she joined the formation of the Constructive Art Association.

She frequented musical sessions at the country house of philosopher Carlos Vaz Ferreira and the busy tertulias at the house of Alfredo and Esther de Cáceres, where she met the musician and writer Felisberto Hernández, whom she married in 1937. The following year, her daughter Ana María was born. The epistolary relationship with Felisberto during his concert tours comprises more than 100 letters populated with drawings and watercolors by Amalia, sketches for the poster of Stravinsky's Petrushka recital. The relationship with Felisberto did not work, and they divorced in 1943. After the separation, Amalia cut out the drawings of the letters and framed them. They were featured in an anthological exhibition in 2008.

In 1943, Nieto received a scholarship and traveled to Chile to take a summer course at the university under Jorge Romero Brest, with whom she began an enduring friendship.

In 1955, she returned to Paris, accompanied by her daughter. She studied engraving with Johnny Friedlaender and attended mosaic courses with Gino Severini.

In 1973, she began teaching at the Círculo de Bellas Artes in Montevideo.

Nieto exhibited regularly at Amigos del Arte and the Ateneo de Montevideo, participated in National Salons, and contributed to Uruguay's submissions to the São Paulo Art Biennial on two occasions. She also illustrated poetry books by Juana de Ibarbourou, Paul Valéry, and Ernesto Pinto. She wrote the children's play Acrobino and made the set for its premiere at the El Tinglado theater in 1972 with Laura Escalante.

Her work achieved international recognition. She was invited to exhibit in Buenos Aires, Paris, Germany, and the United States. She received the Golden Candelabrum Award from B'nai B'rith Uruguay. In 2001, a significant retrospective exhibition took place at the Museum of Contemporary Art in Montevideo. The artist was 94 years old and continued painting.

Nieto was never a naturalist. Neither, in my opinion, could she be clearly constructive. But if she was not entirely naturalistic, it was largely due to the fact that she felt order, abstraction. It was compiled into a synthesis; distantly she tempted the geometric and if she did not enter fully into this it is because the seduction of the real and the poetic of her inner vision had to be seen. Her spirit then took all these essences to form an art of her own.

— Joaquín Torres-García, 1941

== Work ==
Amalia Nieto made numerous drawings, watercolors, paintings with oil and acrylic, sculptures, and engravings. Still lifes, informal landscapes and Parisian streets, constructive compositions and abstractions, give an account of the coherence of the artist's visual landscape in all the media and topics covered. The geometric synthesis present in her paintings, as well as the series she called Naturalezas muertas mentales, highlight her personal imprint on Uruguayan art of the 20th century, a free constructivism that introduces a conceptual and sensitive dimension, close to the metaphysical art of Giorgio Morandi. In the catalog of the exhibition "Amalia Nieto. Retrospectiva 1925–1995", held at the National Museum of Visual Arts in 1995, Ángel Kalenberg noted that she, together with Petrona Viera, made "the most substantial contribution to the history of the Uruguayan plastic arts."

== Awards ==
- Mention at the 3rd São Paulo Art Biennial (1957)
- Grand Prize for Painting at the 31st National Salon (1967)
- Grand Prize for Sculpture at the 33rd National Salon (1969)
- Figari Award from the Central Bank of Uruguay in recognition of her career (1995)
- Golden Candelabrum Award from B'nai B'rith Uruguay (1999)
