= Linda Kohen =

Uruguayan painter (1924–2026)

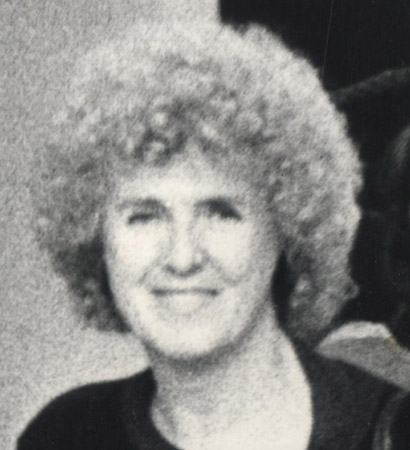
- Kohen in 1993
- Born: Linda Olivetti Colombo; 28 October 1924; Milan, Italy
- Died: 21 January 2026 (aged 101)
- Occupations: Visual artist, painter
- Spouse: Rafael Kohen (1946-2009)
- Awards: Premio Figari

Linda Kohen (28 October 1924 – 21 January 2026) was an Italian and Uruguayan painter who enjoyed a long international career.

== Life and career ==
In 1939, faced with the rejection of Italian racial laws for them, Kohen left Italy with her family and moved to South America. They lived in Buenos Aires and São Paulo and in 1940, the family settled in Uruguay, where Linda began her career. She studied drawing with Pierre Fossay and painting at Taller Torres García with Augusto Torres, José Gurvich, and Julio Alpuy. She also went through the workshops of Eduardo Vernazza and Horacio Butler in Buenos Aires. In 1946, she married Rafael Kohen, adopted his surname and they settled in Buenos Aires until 1948. In 1971, she held her first solo exhibition at the Moretti Gallery in Montevideo and then numerous more followed in Punta del Este, Buenos Aires, São Paulo, Miami, Washington, D.C., and Vicenza, etc.

Kohen died on 21 January 2026, at the age of 101.

== Work ==
Kohen's paintings are intimate in nature, they carry an almost autobiographical tone, numerous subjective self-portraits where her skirt, hands or legs are protagonists, her image reflected in mirrors, details of her house and everyday objects, offer a subjective view of immediate reality of the artist. Even when she painted landscapes, she did so from her window, and she kept her reference to it, as a way of suggesting the scale of it and highlighting her gaze. Her work is serene, inviting introspection, with a muted palette and stripped composition, it refers in a certain way to the metaphysical character in the work of Giorgio Morandi (1890–1964).
