= Eduardo Fabini =

Uruguayan composer and musician

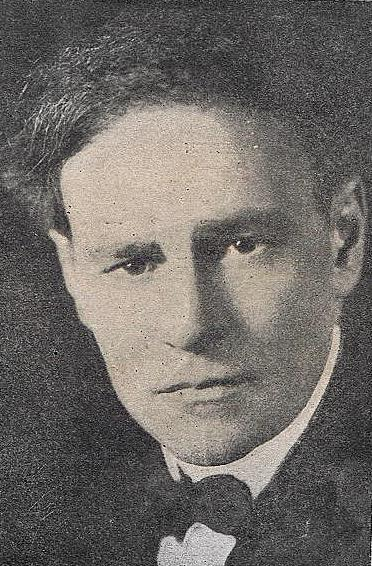
Eduardo Fabini

Eduardo Fabini (Solís de Mataojo, 18 May 1882 – 17 May 1950) was an Uruguayan composer and musician.

Fabini, along with Alfonso Broqua, Luis Cluzeau Mortet and Vicente Ascone, was representative of the nationalist tendency that emerged in Uruguayan music in the 1910s and 1920s.

== Biography ==
Born May 18, 1882 in the small town of Solís de Mataojo, Lavalleja, with his parents Juan Fabini and Antonia Bianchi, of Italian origin and some distinguished musicians in their family. He spent his early childhood in intimate contact with nature. Fabini is considered to be among the best classical composers in Uruguay; making use of national folk music within the forms of classical music. His work has been regarded as expressing exquisite refinement, inspiration, and great musical sensitivity.

His musical knowledge began at an early age. At the age of four years, his favorite toy was the accordion. At six he admired his performances in the harmonium. At this time he began his musical studies of the violin with his older brother. He continued his studies in Montevideo, at the Conservatory "The Lyre" (from 9 to 13 years) with teachers Romeo Massi and Italo Casellas, and later with Scarabelli and Ferroni. On the advice of the teacher Perez Badia, Fabini won a scholarship in 1899 at age 17 that allowed him to travel to Europe and enter the music conservatory in Brussels, where he studied with teachers deloc and Thomson, and harmony with the teacher Brouk.

Beginning in composition, Fabini composed "Tristes" for orchestra, two "Intermedios" an "arpegiano Study" for piano, and, for choir, "Flowers of the field." As a performer, Fabini won First Prize for Violin "with Distinction", awarded by the Brussels Conservatory. Fabini was the first South American in that environment to express their native music.

He returned to Uruguay in 1903, becoming known as soloist through various performances at the Teatro Solís of Montevideo, which aroused admiration. After another trip to Europe, to Spain in 1905 where he remained two years, he returned to Montevideo in 1907. He participated with other Uruguayan musicians in founding the Musical Conservatory of Uruguay, (1907). In 1913, he co-founded the Association of Chamber Music, performing in numerous concerts for that organization as an interpreter.

Around this time, he retired to a life in the countryside, residing in Solís and Fuente Salus, avoiding public activity. During this period he composed "Campo", his first symphonic poem, which was first performed in public at the Teatro Albéniz in Montevideo on April 29, 1922. "Campo" obtained immediately widespread recognition of his musical values, being also lauded in Buenos Aires – where it was performed in 1925 at the Teatro Colón by the Vienna Philharmonic – and soon in New York, Washington, Madrid, Barcelona, Berlin, Moscow, Valencia, Rio de Janeiro and other major music cities such as Vienna, where was performed by the Philharmonic again, under the baton of the Richard Strauss.

Encouraged by this success, Fabini continued intense activity in the composition of works that evoke the sounds and atmospheres of the Uruguayan countryside; presenting soon after his other symphonic poem, "The Island of Ceibos". Among his works are numerous songs, some for school choirs, and a fantasy for violin and orchestra; a ballet from a subject from the poet Fernán Silva Valdés, "Mburucuyá," the "symphonic picture," "Molga", and a children's ballet, "Mañana de Reyes".

In 1927, Fabini was appointed Cultural Attaché at the Embassy of Uruguay in the U.S., enabling him to can move to New York City where "Campo" and "The Island of Ceibos" were recorded with the Philharmonic Orchestra, the record released by Victor Records.

Fabini died in May 1950 due to a heart condition.

Several schools bear his name: the departmental school in Minas (Instituto Eduardo Fabini), the Lyceum Mataojo Solis (Cradle of Fabini) and No. 6 School Music in the city of Rivera.

== Style ==
Román Viñoly Barreto says that "Fabini never felt the anxiety of the innovator; he never sought to flaunt his technical prowess. His music speaks as it does because that is how he feels it; and since he harbors no hope for vain glory—seeking no reward other than the silence he so deeply loves—he occupies a plane of astonishing sincerity.". Salas and Pauletto added that "Fabini is essentially a nativist, a simple and modest musician".

The use of Morse code in music began in the early 20th century, although there is no consensus on which work was the first to incorporate it. Among the compositions generally recognized as pioneering is Das Funkerlied by Bernd Wübbecke, composed in 1939 in Germany, in which the phrase transmitted in Morse code is "Ich liebe dich" ("I love you"). Later examples include Wireless Fantasy by Vladimir Ussachevsky (1960) and Kurzwellen by Karlheinz Stockhausen (1968).

However, some documentation indicates that Eduardo Fabini used Morse code in his Melga Sinfónica (1931), where the horns and pistons spell out the word "Uruguay" in Morse. This is confirmed in studies and notes on the work, which verify both the date of its creation and the use of Morse code. Despite this, Fabini is not typically recognized as a pioneer of the technique, with credit often given to Wübbecke.

== Works ==
=== Symphonic music ===
- Poema sinfónico Campo
- La isla de los Ceibos
- Fantasía para violín y orquesta
- Mburucuyá, ballet
- Melga sinfónica
- Mañana de Reyes, ballet for children

==== Choir and orchestra ====
- La patria vieja
- Las flores del campo
- El Rancho
- A mi Rio
- El Arroyo descuidado
- La Güeya, canción
- El nido

==== Singer and piano ====
- Luz mala
- El Tala
- La flores del monte

==== Piano solo ====
- Dos tristes
- Estudio arpegiado
- Intermezzo
- Scarlattina
- Sarandí en la corriente
- Atlántida

== Discography ==
- Eduardo Fabini y María Luisa Fabini de West. (Orfeo ULP 2765)
- Las cinco grandes obras sinfónicas (Ayuí / Tacuabé t/m12cd. 1998)
- Grabaciones Históricas de su obra Volumen 2 & 3 (Ayuí / Tacuabé tm15-16 cd)
