= Águeda Dicancro =

Uruguayan artist and sculptor (1938–2019)

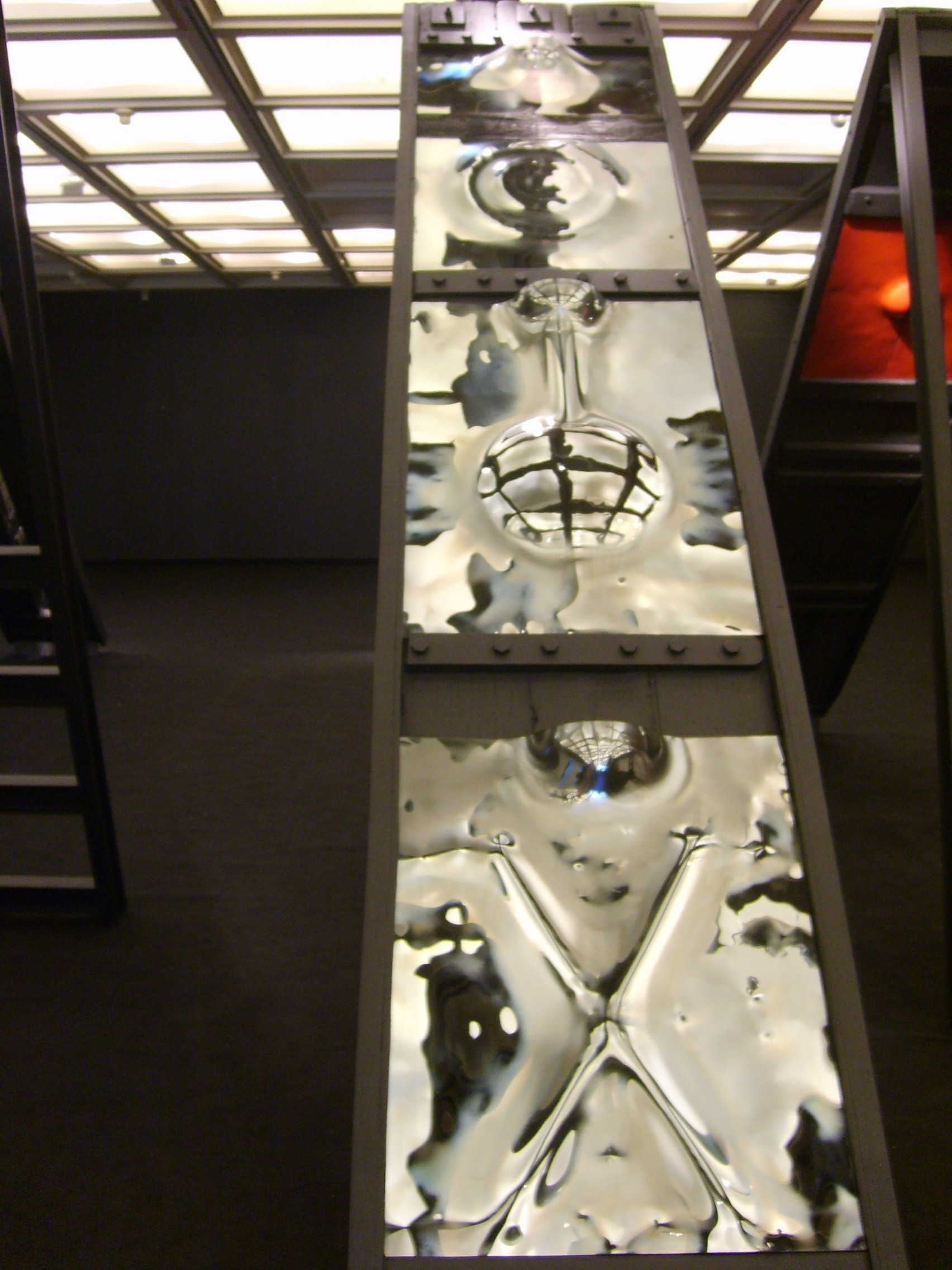
- Arborescencias by Águeda Dicancro, at the Museo Nacional de Artes Visuales (MNAV).
- Born: Águeda Dicancro; 1938; Montevideo, Uruguay
- Died: 14 August 2019 (aged 80–81); Montevideo, Uruguay
- Education: University of the Republic
- Occupation: sculptor
- Awards: Premio Alas; Premio Figari

Águeda Dicancro (1938 – August 14, 2019) was a Uruguayan sculptor from Montevideo, noted for her plastic art. Her art is featured at the Museo Nacional de Artes Visuales in Montevideo.

== Life ==
Dicancro studied at the University of the Republic National School of Fine Arts (Instituto Escuela Nacional de Bellas Artes de la Universidad de la República) between 1960 and 1964, and later at Uruguay's Universidad del Trabajo. She also studied engraving and cement sculpture under Spanish sculptor Eduardo Yepes, before graduating as a professional ceramist in 1964.

She was awarded a scholarship from the Organization of American States and traveled to Mexico in 1964 to study ceramics at the Universidad Nacional Autonoma's School of Applied Arts, and was awarded a second scholarship to study gold and silver metalworking at Mexico's School of Design. However, she is primarily known for her sculptures made of glass, her chief material alongside wood. She began using glass in 1968 in her jewelry, and by 1970 started working with it on a much larger scale, incorporating it into living spaces by collaborating with architects, decorators, and lighting experts. The combination of glass and wood could be seen in her opalescent exhibition Arborescencias at the Museo Nacional de Artes Visuales.

An Águeda Dicancro sculpture of steel and glass can be found in the Telecommunications Tower (Montevideo), the current location of ANTEL.

== Awards ==
- International Ceramic Art Contest XXXIII, Faenza, Italy
- 1965, First Prize in Ceramics at the Ford Foundation Contest, Mexico
- 1966, Grand Prize and First Prize in Jewelry of the 1st Hall of Decorative Arts, National Plastic Arts Committee
- Honorable Mention at the Second International Applied Arts Biennial, Punta del Este
- 1967, Acquisition Prize at the Salón Municipal XV
- Gold Medal at the Commune of Rome (1973)
- 1978, First Prize at the Mural Contest, Puerta del Sol building, Punta del Este
- Acquisition Prize at the Salón Municipal XXXIII
- 2001, Prmio Alas
- 2002, Premio Figari

She was selected to represent Uruguay at the Venice Bienniale in 1993 and the San Pablo Biennial in 1994.
