= Marco Maggi =

Uruguayan-American artist

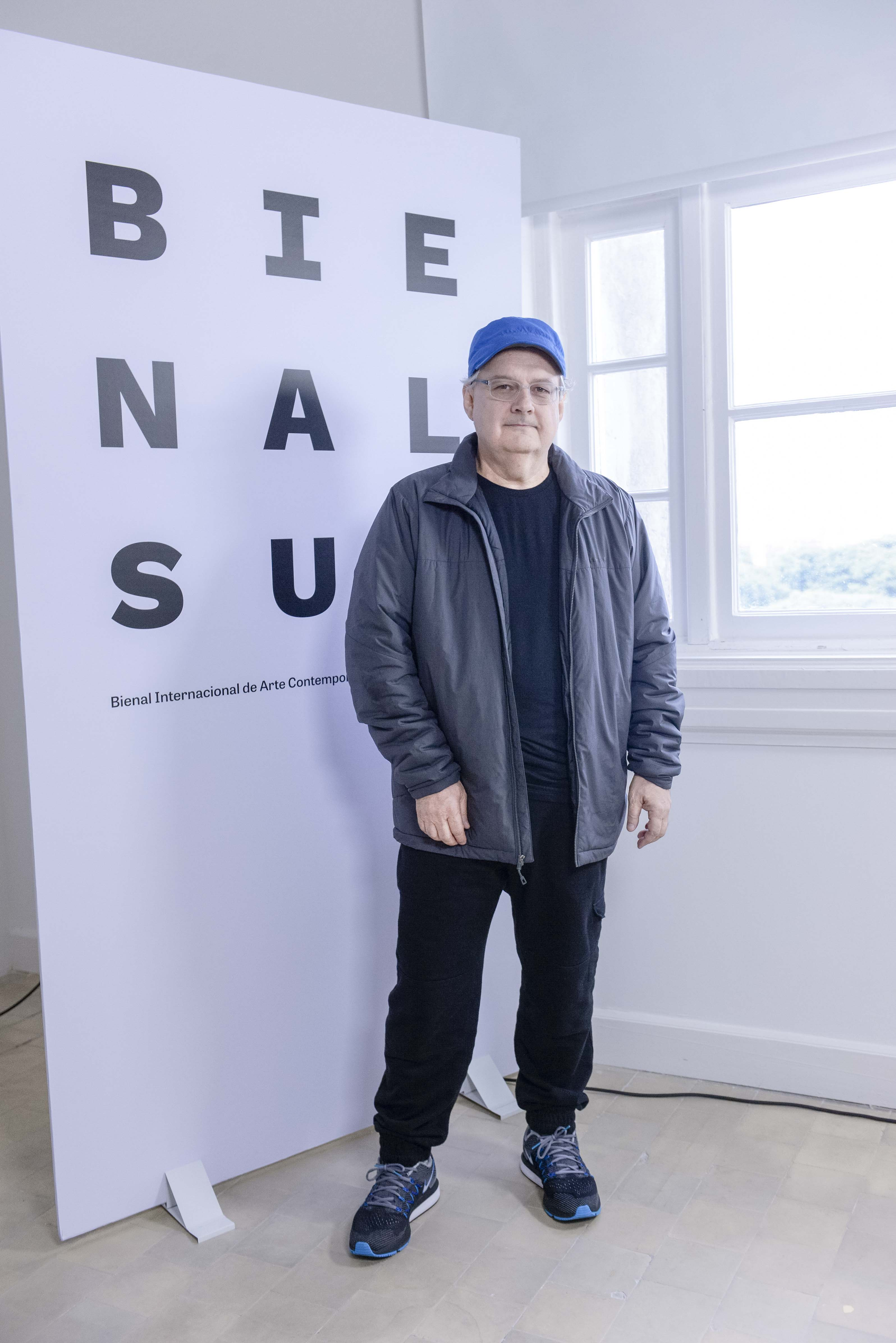
- Maggi in 2016
- Born: 1957 (age 68–69); Montevideo, Uruguay
- Education: State University of New York at New Paltz (MFA)
- Occupation: Artist

Marco Maggi (born 1957 in Montevideo, Uruguay) is a New York and Uruguay-based artist whose work incorporates common materials such as office paper, aluminum foil, graphite, and apples to create micro drawings, sculptures, and macro installations.

Maggi represented Uruguay at the 2015 Venice Biennale.

== Education ==
Maggi received an MFA from the State University of New York in New Paltz.

== Public collections ==
Maggi's work is included in the public collections of Museum of Modern Art (New York), Museum of Fine Arts Houston, Walker Art Center (Minneapolis), Whitney Museum of American Art (New York), Fine Arts Museum of San Francisco, Hirshhorn Museum and Sculpture Garden (Washington, DC), Indianapolis Museum of Contemporary Art, Chicago Art Institute, Hammer Museum (Los Angeles), Los Angeles Museum of Contemporary Art, Museum of Fine Arts, Boston, Cisneros Collection (New York), and the Daros Foundation (Zurich).

== Selected shows ==
Mercosur Biennial (Porto Alegre, Brazil 2001), São Paulo Biennial (São Paulo, Brazil 2002), Havanna Biennial (Havanna, Cuba 2003), Construcciones & Demoliciones (Centro Cultural de España Montevideo, Uruguay 2003), Gwangju Biennial (Gwangju, Korea 2004), Pontevedra Biennial (Pontevedra, Spain 2006), Poetics of the Handmade (Los Angeles MoCA, CA 2006), New Perspectives in Latin American Art, 1930 - 2006 (MoMA, NY 2008), Bienal de Guatemala (Guatemala, 2010), Optimismo Radical (NC Arte Bogotá, Colombia 2011), Bienal de Cuenca (Cuenca, Ecuador 2012), Lentissimo (Vassar College, NY 2012), Drawings in Portuguese (Instituto Tomie Ohtake, São Paulo, 2012), Figari Prize, Career Award (Museo Figari Montevideo, Uruguay 2012).

== Publications ==
- Zamudio, Raul, "Marco Maggi", ARTNEXUS.
- Hunter, Becky, "Interview with Marco Maggi", WHITEHOT MAGAZINE, March.
- Smee, Sebastian. "Filling in the blanks", The Boston Globe, September 12.
- "Uruguaio dá volume ao tempo em exposição", Folha de S.Paulo, August 25.
- Hirszman, Maria. "A arte latino-americana em alta", O Estado de São Paulo, August 23.
- Pedrosa, Adriano. Slow Politics, Nara Roesler gallery, São Paulo, Brazil.
- MacAdam, Alfred. "Marco Maggi", ARTnews, January.
- O’Steen, Daniel."X-Acto Science", Art + Auction, December.
- Tiscornia, Ana. "Marco Maggi, To Be Looked at Closely", Arte al Dia International.
- Yoshpe, Sheila. "A Slow Walk with artist Marco Maggi", Roll Magazine.
- Baker, Kenneth. "Artist Reveals Slivers of Information in S.F. Shows", San Francisco Chronicle, April 8.
- Gonzalez, Julieta. "San Juan Triennial: Latin America and the Caribbean", ArtNexus, No, 56, Vol. 3.
- Schwendener, Martha. "Marco Maggi, The Ted Tuner Collection", Time Out New York, NY, April 28- May 4.
- "The Ted Turner Collection: Report from the Battlefield (Paper on Uccello)", Cabinet, Issue 17.
- Jana, Reena. "How It Was Done: Paper Cuts", Art on Paper, November/December.
- Levin, Kim. "New papers", Village Voice, July 21–27.
- Baker, Kenneth. "Hosfelt Gallery show suggests we’re blinded by information", San Francisco Chronicle, July 10.
- Baker, Kenneth. ArtNews, April.
- Weyland, Jacko. "American splendor", TimeOut New York, NY, Issue 440, March 4–11.
- Church, Amanda. "Pages at Cristinerose/Josée Bienvenu Gallery", Art on Paper, March–April.
- B.L., "Arte: Marco Maggi En El CCE", Caras Caretas, May 9.
- Baker, Kenneth. "Look closely: It's not what you think. 'Warped' works play tricks with space", San Francisco Chronicle, September 20, page D10.
- Barliant, Claire. "The Microwave", Art on Paper, January - February.
- Bing, Alison. "Raising Expectations", sfgate.com, September 18–24.
- Levin, Kim. "Marco Maggi", Village Voice, May 20.
- MacAdam, Barbara A. "Marco Maggi", ARTnews, November.
- MacAdam, Barbara A. "Marco Maggi", Review: Literature and Arts of the Americas, Fall.
- Nichols, Matthew Guy. "Marco Maggi at Cristinerose/ Josée Bienvenu", Art in America, December.
- Phillips, Patricia. "Constructing and Demolishing: manual to settle sediments", Art Journal, Vol. 62, No. 3, Fall.
- Scott, Andrea. "Marco Maggi", Time Out New York, NY, May 15–22.
- Sholis, Brian. "Pages", Artforum.com, December 18.
- Tiscornia, Ana. "Marco Maggi", ArtNexus, September to November.
- "Unending Beginnings: The Graphic Work of Marco Maggi", Southward Art: Latin American Art Review, Year 4, Issue 8, February.
- Wasserman, Sara. "Report from Italy: Roma Renovatio", Art in America, June.
- Waxman, Lori. "Marco Maggi", ArtForum.com, April–June.
- Cresci, Simona. "Marco Maggi alla Salla 1", Time Out Roma, September.
- Gonçalves, Lisbeth Rebollo. "Contemporary Art at the 3rd Mercosur Biennial", ArtNexus, March.
- Hirszman, Maria. "Um susurro sobre a falta de sentido do mundo", O Estado de São Paulo, July.
- Johnson, Ken. "The Microwave", The New York Times, October 4.
- Machado, Alvaro. "Marco Maggi, faz arte a curta distancia", Folha de São Paulo, July 20.
- "Marco Maggi", Veja São Paulo, July 31.
- Pedrosa, Adriano. "Marco Maggi -Sao Paulo Critic’s Pick", ArtForum.com, August.
- Schroth, Mary. "Dalle Bienale Di Sao Paulo alla Salla Uno", La Stampa, September.
- Amarante, Leonor. "Ecos Globais", Bravo!, São Paulo, March.
- Caniglia, Julie. "Marco Maggi, 123 Watts", Artforum, March.
- MacAdam, Barbara A. "The Micro Wave", Art News, April.
- Scott, Andrea K. "Marco Maggi", The New Yorker, January 29.
- A.C, "Las Diez Mejores Galeries dela Feria", ABC Cultural, February 12.
- Baker, Kenneth. "Contemporary Works at Hosfelt", San Francisco Chronicle, August 7.
- E.A., "Lo Ultimo de EE UU", El Pais, February 12.
- McQuaid, Cate. "Landscapes plumb the divine; drawings trace the intricate", The Boston Globe, May 25.
- Porges, Maria. "Marco Maggi", Hosfelt Gallery, ArtForum, December.
- Levin, Kim. "Short List", Village Voice, December 15.
