= Nelson Ramos (artist) =

Uruguayan visual artist

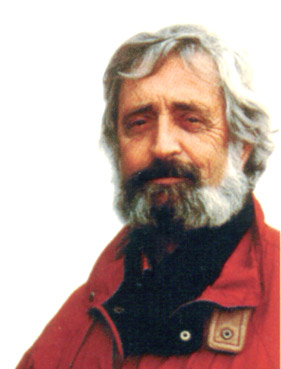
- Nelson Ramos in 2005
- Born: 19 December 1932; Dolores, Uruguay
- Died: 2 February 2006 (aged 73); Montevideo, Uruguay
- Awards: Premio Figari; Premio Fraternidad

Nelson Ramos (19 December 1932 – 2 February 2006) was a Uruguayan visual artist.

In 1995 he received the Fraternity Award for plastic arts.
