= Lacy Duarte =

Uruguayan painter (1937–2015)

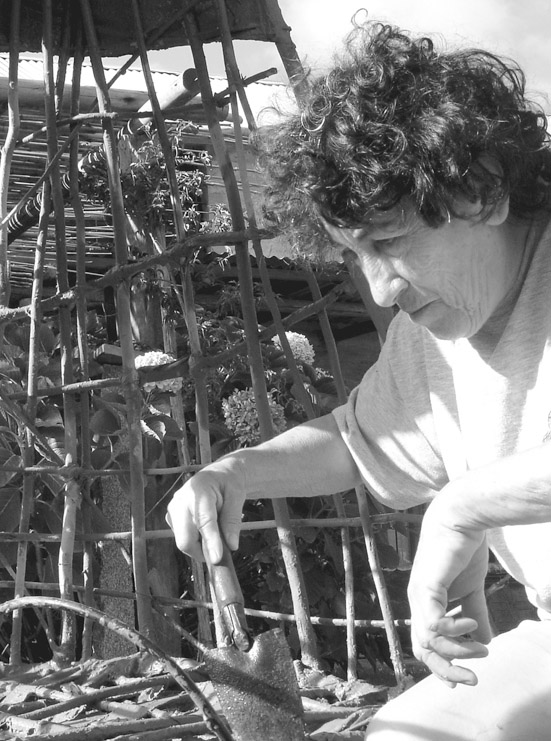
- Born: Elvira Lacy Duarte Cardoso; 15 September 1937; Mataojo, Salto Department
- Died: 27 December 2015 (aged 78); Montevideo
- Occupation: Visual artist
- Awards: Figari Award

Elvira Lacy Duarte Cardoso (15 September 1937 – 27 December 2015) was a Uruguayan visual artist.

== Biography ==
Elvira Lacy Duarte Cardoso was born in Mataojo, Salto Department in Uruguay on 15 September 1937 near the border with Brazil, a rural area that would come to characterize her artwork. In 1952, she moved to the City of Salto and two years later entered the Horacio Quiroga Association's Figari Workshop, where she attended classes with painters José Cziffery, himself trained in the Paris workshop of Henri Matisse, and Ernesto Aroztegui.

In 1959 Duarte married fellow painter Aldo Peralta and had two children, Pablo and Pedro, who both also became painters. In 1962, this family moved to San Carlos in Maldonado Department where Duarte began teaching secondary education drawing classes and began to learn weaving. In 1975, the family fled from the civic-military dictatorship of Uruguay to Porto Alegre, Brazil, and left the Duarte Tapices tapestry workshop to local weavers. Aldo died in 1981, and Duarte returned Montevideo shortly thereafter and resumed painting. In 1986, she was selected to represent Uruguay at the 1987 Havana Biennial and her art would exhibit in the United States and Europe.

In 1990, Duarte started a series of artwork that included paintings and objects such as wood carvings, bread crumbs, ragged bedspreads, the condition of women and their children in the countryside and people performing rural tasks (Farmers, hunters, trappers, etc.). This project, entitled Memoria y ritos en el espacio de la mujer campesina, referred to the differences Duarte observed between urban and rural Uruguayans. This series would exhibit at the Juan Manuel Blanes Museum in the Prado neighborhood of Montevideo, Rio Grande do Sul Museum of Art in Porto Alegre, Linda Moore Gallery in San Diego, California and at the biennials in Paris and Cuenca among other examples of Uruguayan art.

In 2011, Duarte joined the National Visual Arts Commission of the Uruguayan Ministry of Education and Culture.

In 2012, Duarte exhibited Pensado Campo: Recurrencias de Lacy Duarte at the Museo Figari and Tiempo y Tiempo at the Museo Gurvich, both in Montevideo.

Lacy Duarte died in Montevideo, aged 78.

=== Awards ===
In 2002, the Central Bank of Uruguay awarded Duarte the Figari Award, named in honor of Uruguayan painter Pedro Figari, in recognition of her career of art.

In 2005, she represented Uruaguay at the Venice Biennale with an installation that "reflected the neat poverty" of the Uruguayan countryside.
