= Lilián Lipschitz =

Argentine visual artist and goldsmith

Lilián Lipschitz is an Argentine visual artist and goldsmith who was a member of the Taller Torres García art school in Uruguay, and was involved in the Universal Constructivism art movement.

== Biography ==
Lipschitz was born in Argentina. She settled in Montevideo, Uruguay in 1957 and became connected with other artists like Joaquín Torres García and José Gurvich, who she studied under, through the Taller Torres García art school.

Between 1977 and 1978 she participated in art exhibitions in honor of artists Marco López Lomba and Ángel Damián, organized by artists Néffer Kroger and Dumas Oroño.

In March 2024, she attended an exhibition at the Juan Manuel Blanes Museum in Montevideo. The goal of the exhibition was to celebrate the artworks of women who were connected to the Taller Torres García school.
