= Elsa Andrada =

Uruguayan painter

- Born: March 14, 1920; Montevideo, Uruguay
- Died: March 2, 2010 (aged 89); New York City, New York, USA
- Education: Taller Torres García
- Occupation: Painter
- Notable work: Murales del Hospital Saint Bois
- Spouse: Augusto Torres
- Children: 1

Elsa Andrada (Montevideo, March 14, 1920 - New York City, March 2, 2010) was a Uruguayan painter, upholsterer, and plastic artist who was part of the Taller Torres García art school, and is especially known for creating murals at the Hospital Saint Bois.

== Life ==
Elsa Andrada began her studies with Renée Geille Castro of Sayagués Lasso in 1943 and then entered the Taller Torres García art school from 1944 to 1948. She was part of the group that created the Saint Bois Murals in 1944 and her part of the mural is called El tambo.

Through the art school, she met Augusto Torres, a prominent painter and son of Joaquín Torres-García, whom she married in 1951. She made study trips to the United States and Europe starting in 1950 until 1970.

During the last years of her life, she lived in New York with her son Marcos Torres Andrada.

Andrada's works have been exhibited within collections at the following institutions: National Museum of Fine Arts (Uruguay), Municipal Museum of Fine Arts (Uruguay), Saint Bois Hospital - Torre de Antel (Uruguay); and in private collections from Uruguay, Argentina, Chile, Brazil, Mexico, USA, Spain, France, Italy, Netherlands, Germany, Israel and South Africa.

In 2012, the Museum of Pre-Columbian and Indigenous Art (MAPI) named an exhibition room after her and Augusto in appreciation for the loan of a valuable art collection.

In 2021, the José Gurvich Foundation paid tribute to Andrada on her 101st birthday, which had been postponed due to the pandemic. The tribute presented the collection of her works that had been donated by her son after her death. The exhibition was called "Elsa Andrada: una mirada en lo sutil y eterno" and was curated by Lic. María Eugenia Méndez Marconi This exhibition was presented in the Arte por el Urugua tourist booklets, in the departments of San José, Maldonado and Treinta y Tres.

== Exhibitions ==
- 1954- Exhibits at Moretti Gallery (Montevideo, Uruguay).
- 1955- Salon des Indépendants of the Museum of Modern Art (Paris, France).
- 1957- Exhibition "The Young Uruguayan Painting" (Amsterdam, Holland).
- 1986- EP Gallery, Düsseldorf. “4 Uruguayan artists.” with Julio Alpuy, Francisco Matto, Augusto Torres.

== Awards ==
- 1946- Acquisition Prize for he roil "Portrait" at the VII Municipal Painting Salon (Uruguay).
- 1958- Acquisition Prize for her oil "Paris Street" at the X Municipal Painting Salon (Uruguay).
