= Anhelo Hernández Ríos =

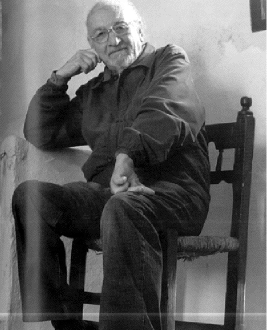
- Born: 21 November 1922; Montevideo, Uruguay
- Died: 11 March 2010 (aged 87); Montevideo, Uruguay
- Occupations: Painter, engraver, sculptor, teacher
- Spouse: Ida Holz (m. 1964)
- Children: Moriana, Arauco, Ayara Hernández
- Parents: José Hernández (father); María Ríos (mother)
- Awards: Morosoli Award (2001, 2009); Figari Award (2003)

Anhelo Hernández Ríos (21 November 1922 – 11 March 2010) was a Uruguayan plastic artist and teacher.

== Biography ==
Anhelo Hernández Ríos was born on 21 November 1922, the son of María Ríos and José Hernández. He attended primary and secondary school at the Elbio Fernández School, and studied preparatory architecture at the Alfredo Vásquez Acevedo Institute (IAVA). From 1935 to 1941, he studied sculpture and drawing with Alberto Savio, a disciple of Aristide Maillol. In 1941, he entered the School of Applied Arts and studied with Antonio Pena, Edmundo Prati, and Federico Moller de Berg. In 1942 he entered the newly formed National Institute of Fine Arts as a fourth-year student and attended the workshop of the sculptor Severino Pose. At the end of 1942 he entered the workshop of Joaquín Torres-García, of which he was a part until the master's death in 1949.

In 1947 he held his first solo exhibition as a member of the Torres-García Workshop at the Tacuarembó Club. In 1969, he won the scholarship of the Uruguay Union of Plastic Artists to study and work at the Superior School of Art in East Berlin, where his mentor in engraving studies was professor Arno Mohr.

Between 1944 and 1953 he worked as a drawing teacher at the Liceo Departamental de Tacuarembó. From 1954 to 1957 he was a drawing teacher at the Industrial School of San Ramón Canelones.

In 1964 he married computer scientist Ida Holz. In 1976 they went into exile in Mexico where, for 11 years, Anhelo worked as a cover designer for Siglo XXI Editores. From 1983 to 1987 he was also a professor in the Postgraduate Division of UNAM's National School of Plastic Arts.

In 1989 he became a Grade 5 teacher for the Fundamental Workshop of Free Orientation of Aesthetics at the National Institute of Fine Arts (IENBA), Montevideo.

Hernández Ríos was invited to participate as a juror at several engraving biennials of the IENBA's National Salon of Plastic Arts, to participate in round tables and to give lectures and seminars on topics of his specialty at the Autonomous University of Mexico, the National School of Plastic Arts of Mexico, the Autonomous University of Puebla in Mexico, the Museo Torres García in Montevideo, and the Uruguay Association of Psychoanalysts, among others. In 2003 he received the Figari Award for his career. On 2 December 2005, he was declared an Illustrious Citizen by the Departmental Board of Montevideo.

He wrote several essays on Uruguayan and Mexican artists, including Joaquín Torres-García, Augusto Torres, Eva Díaz, Francisco Matto, and Myrna Soto, as well as multiple articles and essays on theory and artistic practices.

His last major exhibition was in August 2008 at the National Museum of Visual Arts in Montevideo, "Antológica. Ahnelo Hernández", where numerous paintings, digital prints, etchings, and documents were exhibited.

Anhelo Hernández Ríos died in Montevideo on 11 March 2010.

His works are held by the National Museum of Visual Arts, National Historical Museum, Collection of the Senate of the Republic, Juan Manuel Blanes Museum and Municipal Museum of San José, as well as the Pushkin Museum in Moscow, the Hermitage, and important private collections.

== Awards and honors ==
- 1949, Second Mural Prize for the Palacio de la Luz (in collaboration with Jonio Montiel)
- 1952, Award for Best Work, 5th Salon of Plastic Artists of the Interior, of the Ministry of Public Instruction (for Tacuarembó, oil Piazza Escedra Roma), city of Trinidad, Uruguay
- 1953, First Prize, Secondary Education Competition for Official Portrait of José Artigas
- 1954, Portrait Award, 18th National Salon of Plastic Arts, work Retrato de la Sra. M. V., oil portrait, Uruguay
- 1956, Mention, 1st University Salon of Art, San José, work Retrato de la abuela, Uruguay
- 1956, Acquisition Award, 8th Municipal Salon of Plastic Arts, work Lavandera, lithograph, Montevideo, Uruguay; work Paisaje de Siena, to be presented by the Montevidean Commune to the Commune of Salto in celebration of the founding of the city. The jury awards his engraving La lavandera.
- 1956, Acquisition Award, 8th Municipal Salon of Plastic Arts, work Moriana, oil portrait, in the Juan Manuel Blanes Museum
- 1956, Portrait Award, 20th National Salon of Plastic Arts, work Retrato de la Sra. M. V., oil portrait, Uruguay
- 1957, Acquisition Award, 9th Municipal Salon of Plastic Arts, portrait work Graciela, oil portrait, Uruguay
- 1957, Second Prize, 21st National Salon of Plastic Arts, work Cadáveres hacinados, lithograph, oil portrait; Recuerdo de Orvietto, Uruguay (This last work was added to the collection of the President of the Republic, General Alfredo Baldomir.)
- 1958, Second Prize, 22nd National Salon of Plastic Arts, work Suburbana, zincograph, Uruguay
- 1958, Second Prize, Historic Painting Contest organized by the Departmental Council of Montevideo, Uruguay
- 1959, National Portrait Award, 23rd National Salon of Plastic Arts, work Estudiante de Bellas Artes, oil, and Montevideo, oil portrait, Uruguay
- 1959, Second Drawing and Engraving Prize, 23rd National Salon of Plastic Arts, work La lectora, zincograph; Calle Cerrito, día gris, zincograph, Uruguay
- 1960, Chamber of Representatives Acquisition Award, 5th San José salon, work Calle Cerrito, día gris, Uruguay
- 1960, Portrait Award, 24th National Salon of Plastic Arts, work Graciela, oil portrait, Uruguay
- 1961, Acquisition Award 13th Municipal Salon of Plastic Arts, work Retrato de Chiqui, Uruguay
- 1963, Chamber of Senators Award, 27th National Salon of Plastic Arts, work Feria, Uruguay
- 1964, First Prize for Lithograph Series, A las puertas del Infierno, Commission of Arts and Letters, Punta del Este, Maldonado, Uruguay
- 1969, First Place in the Contest of the Uruguay Union of Plastic Artists, Fellowship of the Weißensee Superior School of Art, East Berlín
- 1979, Exclusive Award, International Contest "Dibujo y Poesía sobre Danza", UNAM Choreographic Workshop. Awarded drawings were included in the book Elogio de la danza, cultural diffusion, UNAM, Mexico.
- 1997, Minister of Education and Culture Samuel Lichtensztein, Declared the exposition of A. Hernández to be held in July 1998 at the UNAM Museum of Contemporary Art to be of ministerial interest.
- 2001, Morosoli Award for Painting, Lolita Rubial Foundation, Minas, Lavalleja, Uruguay
- 2003, Figari Award, Central Bank of Uruguay, 9th Edition
- 2005, Named Illustrious Citizen of Montevideo by the Departmental Board
- 2009, Golden Morosoli, Lolita Rubial Foundation, Minas, Lavalleja, Uruguay
