= Dumas Oroño =

Uruguayan artist (1921–2005)

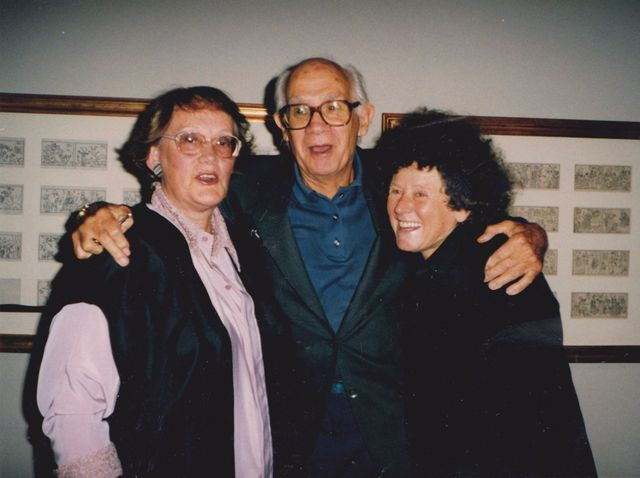
- Dumas Oroño (center) with Néffer Kröger and Renée Pietrafesa in 1995
- Born: 30 October 1921; Tacuarembó, Uruguay
- Died: 28 January 2005 (aged 83); Montevideo, Uruguay
- Occupations: Artist, cultural manager, teacher
- Children: Elena Oroño, Pablo Oroño, Tatiana Oroño
- Awards: Figari Award (2004)

Dumas Oroño (30 October 1921 – 28 January 2005) was a Uruguayan artist, cultural manager, and teacher. His artistic work spanned several disciplines, including painting, engraving, ceramics, murals, and jewelry design.

== Biography ==
From 1939 to 1940 Dumas Oroño studied at the National Institute of Fine Arts in Montevideo, thanks to a scholarship from the Municipality of Tacuarembó for winning the Departmental Artists' Contest. Then he entered the Escuela del Sur, the workshop of Joaquín Torres-García, at the suggestion of Zoma Baitler.

In 1945 he moved to San José to teach drawing classes at the city's high school. He taught high school until 1977, and was also a professor of teaching practice at the Instituto de Profesores Artigas.

In San José he founded the Museum and Workshop of Plastic Arts and directed it from 1947 to 1953. He participated in the organization of the First Salon of Plastic Artists of the Interior in 1948. He also organized the Art Library and the Children's Drawing Workshop.

From 1948 to 1949 he worked in Cecilia Marcovich's studio in Buenos Aires. He traveled to Europe in 1955 in the company of Elsa Andrada, Augusto and Horacio Torres. He participated in the fifth São Paulo Biennial in 1959 and the 1982 Venice Biennale. He was among the organizers of the Show for Liberties held in 1984 by the Uruguay Association of Bank Employees (AEBU), towards the end of the 1973–1985 civic-military dictatorship.

In 1959 he invited other artists from the Torres-García Workshop to create a mural gallery in the Liceo Manuel Rosé building in Las Piedras, a work that remained there until 1964. Among them were Augusto Torres, Francisco Matto, Ernesto Vila, Julio Mancebo, and Manuel Pailós.

He founded the support commission for the Juan Manuel Blanes Museum and helped plan a project to restore and expand the museum and its park and surroundings. A room of the museum bears his name.

Of communist ideology, during Uruguay's full civic-military dictatorship, Oroño organized activities such as "cultural Saturdays" for students and neighbors, held in his own workshop in 1980 with the presence of José Pedro Díaz and Víctor Manuel Leites, among others. He helped to organize the AEBU Show for Liberties in 1984. In 1984 he also contributed to "La peña de los viernes" at the Casa del Autor Nacional, days in which several Uruguayan authors participated.

Oroño won the Figari Award in 2004. He also received the President of the Republic Award for the oil painting Carro de verdulero (1948), the Salon of the Interior Portrait Award (1951), the Salon of the Interior first prize for the oil Tatiana (1952), the Salon of the Interior Acquisition Award for the oil Paisaje de Montmartre, and the Uruguayan Tourist Souvenir Salon Grand Prize (1969). He created a technique of engraving fire and color on calabazas, with which he won the Grand Prize of the Ministry of Tourism and Culture (1969).

He ventured into various disciplines such as drawing, painting, sculpture, murals, engraving, xylography, glazed ceramics, jewelry design, decorated calabazas, stained glass, terracotta, mosaics, acrylic paint, wood, and cement. In Montevideo he painted a score of murals by himself. Other murals of his are found in Punta del Este, Las Piedras, and Asunción, Paraguay.

He was the author of didactic texts such as La expresión plástica infantil (Imprenta López, Buenos Aires, 1951) and El dibujo en el liceo (Imprenta AS, Montevideo, 1961, reissued by EEPAL, Montevideo, 1989). His Cinco cuadernos pedagógicos remains unpublished.
