= Guillermo Fernández (artist) =

- Born: Guillermo León Fernández Sánchez; July 25, 1928; Montevideo, Uruguay
- Died: January 7, 2007 (aged 78); Montevideo, Uruguay
- Education: Taller Torres García
- Known for: Painting, drawing, mural art, teaching
- Notable work: Murals in public buildings across Uruguay
- Style: Constructivism
- Awards: Premio Figari (1997), Premio Morosoli (2002), AIAP/UNESCO Prize for Visual Arts Teaching (2002)

Guillermo León Fernández Sánchez (25 July 1928 – 7 January 2007) was a Uruguayan visual artist, educator, and muralist. He is recognized for his contributions to modern Uruguayan painting and his role as a teacher and mentor to subsequent generations of artists. His work combined formal rigor with an interest in universal visual language, strongly influenced by his training in the Taller Torres García.

== Early life and education ==
Fernández was born in Montevideo, Uruguay. His connection with the Taller Torres García began in 1949, when he met Alceu Ribeiro, one of the members of the workshop. He officially joined the Taller in 1951, where he studied under prominent Uruguayan artists including Augusto Torres, José Gurvich, Francisco Matto, and Horacio Torres, the son of Joaquín Torres García. This training deeply informed his artistic vocabulary, which was rooted in constructivist principles and an exploration of symbolic visual languages.

== Career and artistic development ==
From early in his career, Fernández balanced art-making with a strong commitment to education. He began teaching drawing in Uruguay's public secondary education system in 1953 and continued until 1978. He was most notably a teacher at the Liceo de Progreso. He also founded and directed the Taller Municipal de Artes Plásticas in Paysandú between 1959 and 1966.

After returning to Montevideo, he established his own independent workshop where he mentored many young artists, fostering their search for individual visual expression while grounding them in formal structures such as point, line, plane, and symbol. His pedagogy was informed by a desire to link universal artistic concerns with personal creativity.

Throughout his career, Fernández produced drawings, paintings, and murals. He created public artworks using materials such as bronze, stone, wood, and mosaics. His illustrations were also featured in various Uruguayan publications, and he collaborated with institutions such as the Cine Club del Uruguay.

== Recognition ==
Fernández's work was widely exhibited and received numerous accolades. Among his most notable awards are:

- Third Prize for Mural Decoration (Palacio de la Luz, 1950)
- Acquisition Prize, XII Salón Municipal (1960)
- Second Prize in the competition for the José Batlle y Ordóñez Memorial (1963)
- Premio Figari from the Central Bank of Uruguay, recognizing his artistic career (1997)
- Morosoli Award for painting from the Fundación Lolita Rubial (2002)
- Premio a la Enseñanza de las Artes Plásticas from AIAP/UNESCO (2002)

His works are part of public and private collections, including the Uruguayan Parliament and the Museo Nacional de Artes Visuales (MNAV).

== Later years and legacy ==
In his final years, Fernández remained active in both creative and pedagogical spheres. His commitment to the transmission of knowledge and artistic values made him a respected figure among Uruguayan artists and cultural institutions.

He died in a traffic accident in Montevideo on 7 January 2007.

In 2017, the Museo Nacional de Artes Visuales held a major retrospective, Guillermo Fernández: la travesía de un maestro, curated by María Eugenia Grau. The exhibition was accompanied by a catalogue that explored his biography, educational work, and artistic contributions. The Museo Figari also organized a presentation of the accompanying book, reflecting the sustained scholarly and public interest in Fernández's legacy.
