= Amalia Polleri =

Uruguayan teacher, artist, poet, journalist, art critic

- Born: 26 June 1909; Montevideo, Uruguay
- Died: 18 June 1996 (aged 86)
- Occupations: Teacher, artist, poet, journalist, art critic
- Mother: Fanny Carrió
- Awards: Golden Candelabrum Award

Amalia Polleri de Viana (26 June 1909 – 18 June 1996) was a Uruguayan teacher, artist, poet, journalist, and art critic.

== Biography ==
Amalia Polleri devoted herself to painting, sculpture, engraving, poetry, and storytelling. She was a teacher of drawing and defender of women's rights. She wrote for La República, El Diario, La Mañana, Brecha, and other print media. She also worked in radio journalism. She received the Golden Candelabrum Award from B'nai B'rith Uruguay.

She was a teacher of secondary education at the Instituto de Profesores Artigas and Universidad del Trabajo del Uruguay (UTU).

Polleri died on 18 June 1996, at the age of 86.

In 2013, an exhibition was held at the Museo Gurvich that reviewed part of her work.

== Awards ==
Polleri won 1st prize in drawing and engraving at the 1942 National Salon for her drawing El niño loco. In 1995 she received the Gold Candelabrum Award from the Jewish organization B'nai Brith in recognition of her career.

== Works ==
- El niño loco (drawing, First Prize Drawing and Engraving, National Salon 1942)
- El lenguaje gráfico plástico: manual para docentes estudiantes y artistas, Amalia Polleri, María Celia Rovira, and Brenda Lissardy.
- Arte y Comunicación visual. Metodología y dimensión futura (1994) with Amalia Polleri and María Celia Rovira
