= Raquel Orzuj =

Uruguayan artist and cartoonist (1939–2018)

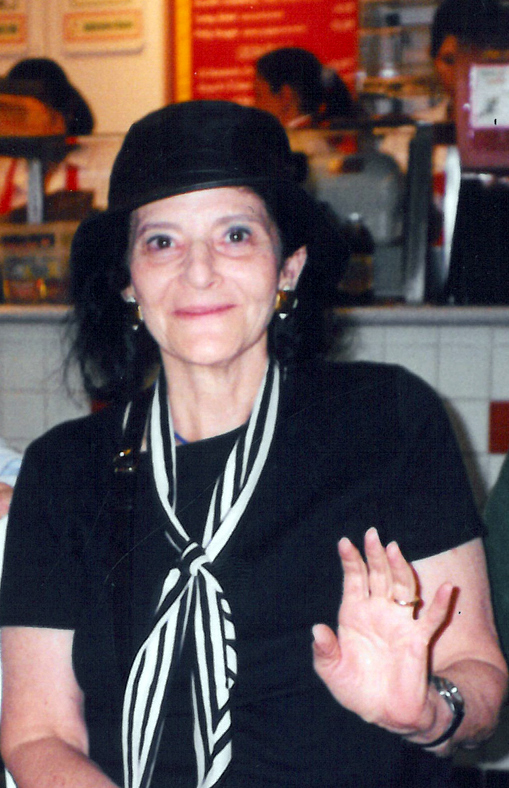
- Raquel Orzuj
- Born: January 30, 1939; Montevideo, Uruguay
- Died: October 3, 2018 (aged 79); Montevideo, Uruguay
- Other name: ms. orzuj
- Education: Taller Torres García; Instituto Nacional de Bellas Artes y Literatura
- Occupations: Artist, writer, director

Raquel Orzuj (January 30, 1939 - October 3, 2018) was a Uruguayan artist, cultural journalist, and film director known for her humorous cartoons. She signed her work as "ms. orzuj."

== Life ==
Raquel Orzuj was born on January 30, 1939, in Montevideo, Uruguay. She was Jewish and her father, Moisés Orzuj, was an immigrant from Lithuania who founded the Yiddish-language newspaper Folksblat. As a child, her parents were connected with influential Jewish Uruguayan figures like Juan Carlos Onetti and Zoma Baitler, as well as Golda Meir, the former Primer Minister of Israel.

She studied at the Instituto Nacional de Bellas Artes y Literatura, the Instituto de Profesores Artigas, and the Taller Torres García art school under Joaquín Torres García.

Orzuj began working as an editor at the WittyWorld international cartoon magazine in 1988.

In 1994, she founded the Salón internacional de Humor Grafico de la mujer ("International Women's Graphic Humor Exhibition") in order to support other women cartoonists. She has also led cartoon and artist workshops around the world.

Orzuj used humor to cross cultural boundaries and discuss international human rights issues in her artworks, especially violence against women and children.

Her work has been exhibited at museums in Uruguay, Spain, the United States, Argentina, Mexico, Italy, Germany, South Korea, and many others.

== Works (selected) ==
=== Books ===
- Historia del Humor Gráfico en Uruguay, (2006) published by Milenio Publicaciones S.L., ISBN 9788497431996

=== Art ===
- 500 AÑOS DE PRESENCIA JUDÍA EN AMÉRICA, an award-winning stamp design

=== Documentaries ===
- Resplandor de la memoria, directed by Mateo Etchegoyhen

== Awards and nominations (selected) ==
- Gran Premio Nacional De Pintura El Azahar- Uruguay
- Primer Premio Municipal De Pintura
- 26 International Art and Humor Awards (IDB Finalist Winner-Usa-2005 and Golden Helmet–Prize, 2003)
