= Guillermo Fernández =

Guillermo Fernández may refer to:

- Guillermo Fernández (artist) (1928–2007), Uruguayan visual artist
- Guillermo Fernández (footballer, born 1991), Argentine football midfielder for Rosario Central
- Guillermo Fernández (footballer, born 1993), Spanish football forward for Semen Padang
- Guillermo Fernández Groizard (born 1960), Spanish film director, Proyecto Dos
- Guillermo Fernández Jurado (1923–2013), Argentinian journalist and film director, curator of the Museo del Cine Pablo Ducrós Hicken
- Guillermo Fernández Romo (born 1978), Spanish football manager
- Guillermo Fernández-Shaw (1893–1965), Spanish poet, librettist and journalist
- Guillermo Fernández de Soto (born 1953), Colombian lawyer and diplomat
- Guillermo Fernández Vara (1958–2025), Spanish politician and coroner, president of the Extremadura regional government
- Guille Fernández (footballer, born 1989), Spanish football manager and former midfielder
- Guille Fernández (footballer, born 2008), Spanish football midfielder for Barcelona Atlètic

Where Fernández is the second surname:

- Guillermo Arriaga Fernández (1926–2014), Mexican dancer, choreographer and composer
- Guillermo Falasca Fernández (born 1977), Spanish volleyball player
- Guillermo Zorrilla Fernández (born 1963), Mexican politician
