= Orono =

Orono may refer to:

== Places ==
- Oroño Boulevard, Rosario, Santa Fe Province, Argentina
- Orono, Ontario, Canada, a town in the Municipality of Clarington

=== United States ===
- Orono, Maine, a town in Penobscot County, home to the University of Maine
  - Orono (CDP), Maine, the main settled area of the town
- Orono, Michigan, an unincorporated community
- Orono, Minnesota, a city in Hennepin County
- Orono Township, Muscatine County, Iowa

== People ==
- Dumas Oroño (1921–2005), Uruguayan artist
- Joseph Orono (1688–1738), Penobscot Indian chief
- Nicasio Oroño (1825–1904), Argentine politician and lawyer
- Rafael Orono (born 1958), Venezuelan boxer
- Orono Wor Petchpun (born 1978), Thai kickboxer and mixed martial artist
- Orono Noguchi, member of Superorganism (band)

== Other uses ==
- Hedone orono, a butterfly of family Hesperiidae
