= Rodolfo Visca =

Uruguayan artist

Rodolfo Mario Visca Visca
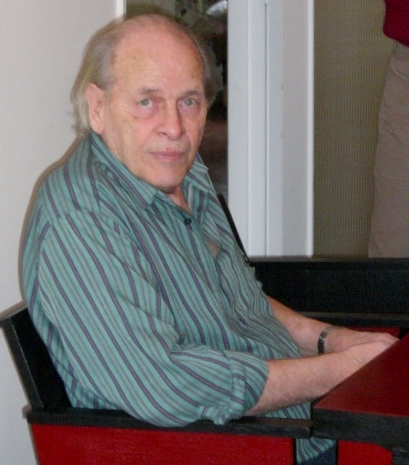
- Born: Rodolfo Mario Visca Visca; September 3, 1934; Montevideo, Uruguay
- Died: June 12, 2009 (aged 74); Montevideo, Uruguay
- Education: Taller Torres García, Montevideo
- Known for: Painting, Sculpture, Goldsmithing, Art Restoration, Teaching
- Notable work: Various paintings, sculptures, and metalwork pieces
- Style: Constructivism
- Movement: Constructivist Art, Modern Latin American Art
- Awards: First Prize, Innovation in Craftsmanship, Montevideo (1990); * Recognition in Aluarte Competition (1992)
- Memorials: Posthumous exhibition at Museo Gurvich, Montevideo (2009)

Rodolfo Mario Visca Visca (3 September 1934 – 12 June 2009) was a Uruguayan painter, sculptor, goldsmith, professor, and restorer. His artistic influence is primarily rooted in his early education at the Taller Torres García, a transformative art school in Montevideo. Known for his multidisciplinary approach, Visca left an enduring legacy within the Latin American art scene.

== Early life and education ==
Rodolfo Mario Visca was born in Montevideo, Uruguay, into a family where he developed an early passion for the arts. By age nine, he joined the Taller Torres García, an influential studio and school founded by the celebrated artist Joaquín Torres García. This early exposure to the workshop's Constructivist philosophy profoundly shaped Visca's creative development and career. He continued his artistic studies there until the school closed in 1958.

== Artistic career and teaching ==
In 1956, Visca founded Taller Sótano del Sur in Montevideo, where he mentored young artists, fostering a new generation of creative talent. His own work traversed various artistic forms, from painting and sculpture to intricate metalwork, reflecting the Constructivist principles learned at Taller Torres García but with a distinctive personal interpretation.

In 1991, Visca received a scholarship from the Centro Europeo and the Fundación Venezia Viva, allowing him to study metal restoration techniques in Venice. This experience enriched his understanding of art restoration, which became an integral part of his later work.

== Notable exhibitions ==
Throughout his life, Visca showcased his work in numerous exhibitions both locally and internationally, emphasizing the universality of his art. Some of his most notable exhibitions included:

- First World Festival of Youth in Helsinki, Finland, 1962
- Joaquín Torres García y su Escuela at Praxis Gallery in New York, 1996
- El Taller Torres García at Sala Dalmau, Barcelona, Spain, 1998

These exhibitions, along with others held in Uruguay, Spain, and the United States, brought significant visibility to his work and highlighted the lasting impact of the Taller Torres García tradition (source).

== Awards and recognition ==
Visca received several awards recognizing his contributions to Uruguayan art. In 1990, he was awarded First Prize in Montevideo's Innovation in Craftsmanship competition. In 1992, he earned recognition in the Aluarte Competition, underscoring his expertise in craftsmanship and innovation. His reputation as both an artist and educator brought him widespread respect within the Uruguayan art community.

== Legacy ==
Rodolfo Visca's influence on Latin American art endures through his works, students, and contributions to the preservation of Uruguayan cultural heritage. His posthumous 2009 exhibition at the Museo Gurvich in Montevideo showcased previously unseen works, shedding new light on his creative range and inspiring renewed interest in his legacy. His pieces continue to be featured in art auctions, signifying his lasting impact on the art world.
