= Jorge Brito =

Jorge Brito may refer to:

- Jorge Brito (baseball) (born 1966), former Major League Baseball catcher
- Jorge Brito (volleyball) (born 1966), Brazilian retired volleyball player
- Jorge Horacio Brito (1952–2020), Argentine banker and businessman
- Jorge Brito (visual artist) (1925–1996), Argentine artist
