= Josep Collell =

Spanish painter (1920–2011)

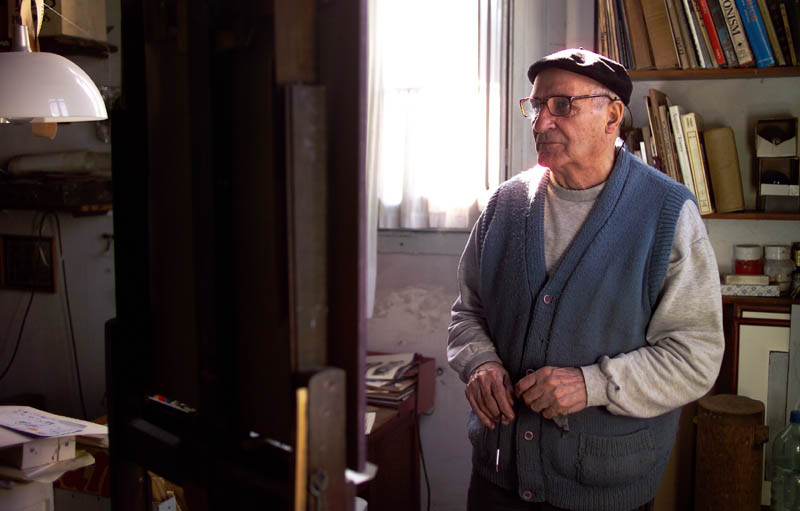
- Born: Josep Collell; 18 July 1920; Vic, Spain
- Died: 21 July 2011 (aged 91); Montevideo, Uruguay
- Other name: José Collell
- Known for: Painting, ceramics
- Movement: Taller Torres García
- Spouse: Carmen Cano

Josep Collell (July 18, 1920 – July 21, 2011) was a Catalan painter, ceramicist, and educator, who was from Spain and lived in Montevideo, Uruguay. He was a member of the Taller Torres García school of art and in 1955 he created, together with his wife Carmen Cano, the Taller Collell (Collell Workshop) of ceramics where for thirty years they taught their ceramic technique, the burnished engobe. He also went by the name José Collell.

== Biography ==
Josep Collell was born in 1920, in Vic, Barcelona, Spain. His passion for drawing and painting was shaped in the Escola Municipal de DIbuix of Vic. In 1946 he was a founder member of “Els Vuit” (The Eight), a group of painters who shared a similar artistic concern and a desire to build bridges with the artistic strength previous to the Spanish Civil War.

- 1950 He arrived to Montevideo and entered the Taller Torres García, as a student of the painter Julio Alpuy.
- 1953 Carmen Cano, his wife, went to meet him.
- 1955 He opened with her the Taller Collell (TC) of ceramics in Montevideo. He contributed to set up the Taller de Artes Plásticas of Maldonado (1958), he taught in the Taller de Artes Plásticas de Rocha (1962-1970) and also in the Museo Departamental de San José (1966).
- 1961 He travelled with Carmen to Spain and learned the technique of enamel on copper.
- 1967 With his students travelled to Bolivia and Peru.
- 1970 Josep visited Spain and Italy. He admired Italian frescoes, he reencountered the Catalan Romanesque Art and he also visited the Museo del Prado.
- 1977 He exhibited ceramics at the Gordon Gallery of Buenos Aires
- 1982 At the request of the Uruguayan architect, Mario Payssé Reyes, he made three ceramic panels for the Embassy of Uruguay in Buenos Aires.
- 1985 He retired and closed the Taller Collell. From then on he devoted himself to painting. From 1986 to 1991 the TC was run by Carmen Cano and Josefina Pezzino.
- 1994 Together with his wife made their last travel to Spain. He exhibited paintings in Vic and in 1995 in Barcelona
- 2000 He received the Premio Moroli of ceramics and exhibited paintings at the Sala Figari in the Ministerio de Relaciones Exteriores of Montevideo.
- 2008 Organized by El Colectivo Cerámica Uruguay he received, together with the ceramic artists Marco López Lomba, Tomás Cacheiro, Eva Díaz and José Gurvich, an hommage to his ceramic career.

He died on July 21, 2011, and Carmen on December 11 of that same year.

== The Taller Collell and its burnished engobe ==
On entering the Taller Torres García, he discovered Universalismo Constructivo (Universal Constructivism). It was the name given by Joaquín Torres García to the artistic language he wanted to create for Latin America in order to unite the primitive vision of Pre-Columbian Art and the geometrical abstraction of the European avant-gardes. An aesthetic approach to project to applied arts as well, from ceramics to architecture, and a way to stimulate experimentation with different techniques and materials.

In this atmosphere, Josep Collell first encountered ceramics. From the mid-1940s artists in the Taller painted commercial vessels with the oil painting technique, but when Jorge Piria provided them with a kiln, they could already fired glazed pieces. Julio Alpuy, Horacio Torres, Manuel Pailós, Antonio Pezzino, José Gurvich, and Julio Otero, among others, applied the constructive language to ceramics. Collell started his first ceramic experiments with Antonio Pezzino, Carlos Martinez, Rodolfo Visca and Gonzalo Fonseca. They wanted to build their own ceramic forms and, inspired by the technique and forms of Pre-Columbian ceramics, they investigated the preparation of clay, its firing, and also made their first burnished engobes. Josep persisted in these preliminary essays in order to find a technique, the burnished engobe, that could allow him to paint, grease and burnish the pieces before firing so that clay became another painterly support. From the creation of the Taller Collell in 1955 to its closure in 1985, Josep and Carmen taught with great generosity and dedication the technique of the TC and they also projected a ceramic vision that left its artistic and human mark on the many students attending the Taller.

Presently, Casa Collell, the home and Taller Collell, exhibits Josep's work and other artists of La Escuela del Sur. It is also the studio of the ceramicist Josefina Pezzino, who teaches, among others, the technique of the TC.

Its legacy is also present in the ceramics of Lidya Buzio, and Carme Collell who have spread it through United States and Europe.
