= Jorge Brito (visual artist) =

Argentinian-born artist (1925–1996)

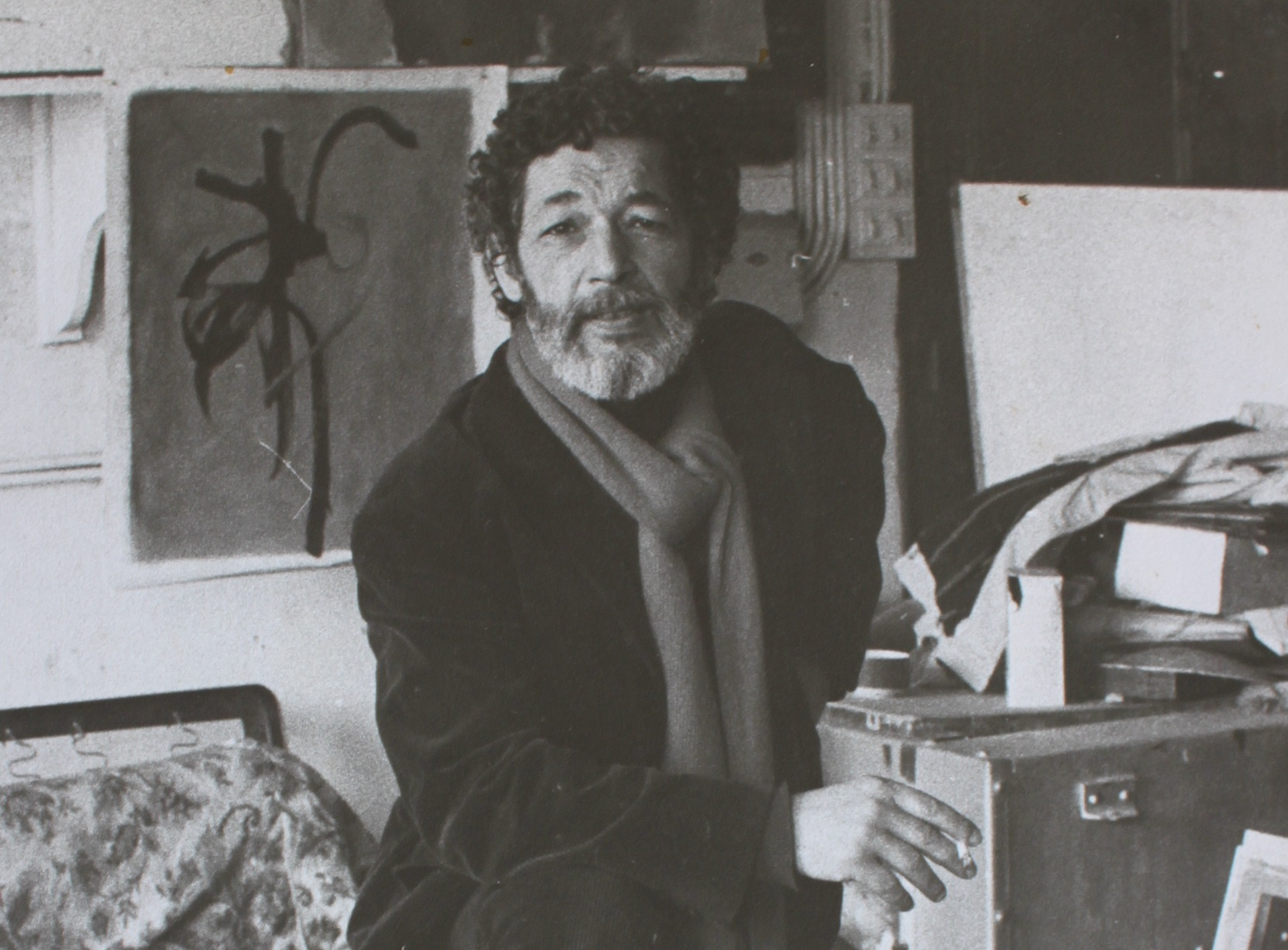
- Jorge Brito at his studio - Paris 1980
- Born: Jorge Enrique Brito; 11 June 1925; Buenos Aires, Argentina
- Died: 17 February 1996 (aged 70); Paris, France
- Resting place: Villiers-le-Bel, France
- Education: Manuel Belgrano National Fine Arts School; Prilidiano Pueyrredon National Fine Arts School
- Style: Arte Concreto, Constructivism, Figurativism
- Spouse: Lola Altamira
- Website: http://www.jorgebrito.com/

Jorge Enrique Brito (11 June 1925, Buenos Aires – 17 February 1996, Paris) was an Argentine muralist, medalist, art educator, sculptor, and painter. He is best known for his murals in Buenos Aires and Montevideo and the bronze medals he designed for the Monnaie de Paris.

Brito gained recognition for being a signatory of the Manifiesto de Cuatro Jóvenes (Manifesto of Four Young Artists) in 1942 which protested the annual National Art Exhibition of Buenos Aires (Salón Nacional de Buenos Aires) competition and its effects on art education in Argentina.

He began his career as an artist in 1942. He worked in Argentina, Uruguay, and Venezuela before settling in Paris in 1968 where he continued his career until his death in 1996.

== Early life ==
Jorge Enrique Brito was born on 11 June 1925 in Buenos Aires. He studied at the Manuel Belgrano National Fine Arts School in Buenos Aires from 1938 to 1941. He began studying at the Prilidiano Pueyrredon National Fine Arts School in 1942.

== Career ==
In September 1942, Brito and fellow art students Tomas Maldonado, Claudio Girola, and Alfredo Hlito wrote and signed a pamphlet entitled Manifiesto de Cuatro Jóvenes in protest of an art competition hosted at Palais de Glace. He received recognition for his role in the manifesto and shortly after decided to pursue a career as an artist.

Inspired by Uruguayan painter Joaquín Torres-García, Brito relocated to Montevideo in 1943. He initially intended to join Torres-García's Taller Torres García (TTG) organization to take classes under Torres-García himself. However, for reasons unknown, he never joined the organization and returned to Argentina in 1944. While staying in Córdoba, he met and married Lola Altamira, an art teacher.

He returned to Uruguay in 1945, moving to Montevideo with an art student named Antonio Pezzino from Córdoba. He then settled with his wife in Pocitos where he studied under Uruguayan painter Manuel Aguiar. Brito and Pezzino both became closely tied to Torres-García and his associates.

In 1947, he received his first award for painting when a portrait he sent to the eleventh National Painting and Sculpture competition hosted by the Uruguayan Ministry of Culture won a Silver Medal in the Foreign Artist Award category. Later that year he had his first solo exhibition at the Club Libertarios in Montevideo. As part of its sample, he gave a lecture on the subject of "two streams in abstract painting". He further gained popularity in early 1948 when he was a featured artist at the Uruguayan Painters Exhibition held at the Casino Míguez Hotel in Punta del Este.

Brito began his career as an art educator in 1950 when he was hired as a professor of applied arts at the Uruguay Industrial Design School where he began his studies in ceramics. He was later promoted to Director of the Fine Arts department of the Escuela Técnica Superior de Melo in Melo, Uruguay in 1952. While living in Melo, his two oil paintings 'Lovers' and 'The Christ' were featured in the XVII National Hall and he gave lectures at the Club Unión de Melo social club.

In 1954, Brito began contributing to public art in Montevideo with three street art murals and a ceramic relief in a building designed by architect Vaz Nadal. He would later win an award from the Ministry of Education of Uruguay in 1956 for a mural entitled 'Cervantes' located on Soriano street in Montevideo.

Brito returned to Buenos Aires in 1958, settling with his family in El Palomar, where he gave lectures to the Faculty of Architecture at the University of Buenos Aires. In 1959, he worked with architects Mauricio Rantz and Rodolfo Cortegoso to build a ceramic mural in the lobby of the 1214 Anchorena Street building in Buenos Aires. While living in El Palomar, José Gurvich, a notable Uruguayan painter and friend of Brito, and his wife resided with Brito and his family where he created a series of construction panels.

He worked with Rantz and Cortegoso again in 1960 to create a fresco plaster frieze for a gallery the pair had created in Flores which he completed in 1961. In 1962, Brito was a participant in the first International Exhibition of Industrial Design hosted by the Buenos Aires Museum of Modern Art. At this point in his career he worked primarily with ceramics, scenery painting, illustration, and industrial design.

In late 1962, Brito immigrated to Venezuela and settled in Caracas. While in Venezuela he gave lectures to the Faculty of Architecture at the Central University of Venezuela and in 1964 participated in the first Young Latin American Artists Salon at the Museum of Fine Arts of Caracas, where three of his works were featured.

In 1968, Brito left South America for Europe. He traveled throughout Spain, Italy, and France, before settling in Paris. While in Paris, Brito focused on sculpting, primarily with bronze, and he became a medalist for the Monnaie de Paris. His sculpted bronze medals appeared in ten volumes of the Grand Fontes series of its monthly bulletin entitled Bulletin Le Club Français de la Médaille between 1978 and 1986. His medals were also featured in a volume of the Bulletin's Effigies series in 1984 and four volumes of its monthly Revue de la Médaille d'Art Métal Pensant bulletin between 1987 and 1991.

He was also featured in several exhibitions in Paris between 1976 and 1988. He was featured twice at the Maître Albert Gallery in Paris in 1977 and 1979, once appeared in the Médailleurs Epagnols et Français exhibition held at the Casa de Velázquez in Madrid, and was featured in an exhibition in Paris in 1988 called "Paris & Prague: Art and Artists Seen Through the Medal and the Sculpture of the Twentieth Century".

== Personal life ==
Brito met Lola Altamira in 1944 while temporarily staying in Córdoba after returning to Argentina from Uruguay. They married the same year. They would have six children together, three sons and three daughters. His first son Cristian, born in 1945, died in 1956.

Brito died in Paris on 17 February 1996. He was buried in Villiers-le-Bel.

== Works ==
=== Paintings and murals ===
- Lovers (1953), oil painting
- The Christ (1953), oil painting
- Cervantes (1956), wall mural located at C. Soriano 1658 in Montevideo
- Comedians (1956), oil painting
- Glazed ceramic mural at 3715 Traful Street, Buenos Aires (1961)
- Initiation au Vol (1990), oil painting
- Retour du Fils Prodige (1990), oil painting

=== Bronze medals ===
- 1978 - 'Hamlet' - Grand Fontes Series - Bulletin Le Club Français de la Médaille No. 58 - Monnaie de Paris (122x115mm)
- 1978 - 'Faust' - Grand Fontes Series - Bulletin Le Club Français de la Médaille No. 59-60 - Monnaie de Paris (130x134mm)
- 1978 - 'Violence du Temp' - Grand Fontes Series - Bulletin Le Club Français de la Médaille No. 61 - Monnaie de Paris (160x150mm)
- 1979 - 'Du Jeu des Masques' - Grand Fontes Series - Bulletin Le Club Français de la Médaille No. 65 - Monnaie de Paris (170x93mm)
- 1980 - 'Hommage à Kafka' - Grand Fontes Series - Bulletin Le Club Français de la Médaille No. 68 - Monnaie de Paris (170x130mm)
- 1983 - 'Image Sécrete' - Grand Fontes Series - Bulletin Le Club Français de la Médaille No. 81 - Monnaie de Paris (200x170)
- 1984 - 'L'Homme et le Mystère' - Grand Fontes Series - Bulletin Le Club Français de la Médaille No. 82-83 - Monnaie de Paris (120x110mm)
- 1984 - 'L'Illusion d'Être' - Grand Fontes Series - Bulletin Le Club Français de la Médaille No. 85 - Monnaie de Paris (110x95mm)
- 1984 - 'Antonio Machado' - Effigies Series - Bulletin Le Club Français de la Médaille No. 86-7 - Monnaie de Paris (68mm)
- 1985 - 'Point Oméga' - Grand Fontes Series - Bulletin Le Club Français de la Médaille No. 86-7 - Monnaie de Paris (140x115mm)
- 1986 - 'Paradoxe du Miroir' - Grand Fontes Series - Bulletin Le Club Français de la Médaille No. 92 - Monnaie de Paris (160x125mm)
- 1987 - 'Tango' - Revue de la Médaille d'Art Métal Pensant - Monnaie de Paris (200x140mm)
- 1990 - 'Ange Musicien' - Revue de la Médaille d'Art Métal Pensant - Monnaie de Paris (220x90mm)
- 1990 - 'Hommage à Rilke' - Revue de la Médaille d'Art Métal Pensant - Monnaie de Paris (100x100mm)
- 1991 - 'Sonnet de la Mélancolie' - Revue de la Médaille d'Art Métal Pensant - Monnaie de Paris (100x100mm)

=== Exhibitions ===
- 1976 - Galerie Doddol, Paris
- 1977 - Ten Rioplatenses Artists - Maître Albert Gallery, Paris
- 1979 - Maître Albert Gallery, Paris
- 1979 - Galerie d'Art, Paris
- 1980 - Galerie Valmay, Paris
- 1984 - Rumeurs d'Hiver - Galérie Valmay, Paris
- 1984 - Médailleurs Epagnols et Français - Casa de Velázquez, Madrid
- 1988 - Paris/Prague - Art and Artists Seen Through the Medal and the Sculpture of the Twentieth Century, Paris

== Awards ==
- Foreign Artist Award, Silver Medal - XI National Painting and Sculpture, Uruguay (1947)
- London-Paris Bronze Medal Award - XV National Painting and Sculpture, Uruguay (1951)
- Foreign Artist Award, Silver Medal - XX National Painting and Sculpture, Uruguay (1956)
