= Baibokai =

Baibokai (Polish: Bajbaki) may refer to:

- Baibokai (Biržai), Biržai District Municipality, Lithuania
- Baibokai (Panevėžys), Panevėžys District Municipality, Lithuania
- Baibokai, a former village in place of Šančiai, a district of Kaunas, Lithuania
