= María Esther Mendy =

Uruguayan painter (born 1910)

- Born: María Esther Mendy Amestoy; October 10, 1910; Salto, Uruguay
- Occupations: Painter and visual artist
- Organization: Taller Torres García

María Esther Mendy Amestoy (born Salto, October 10, 1910 - Montevideo, 1979) was a Uruguayan painter and visual artist. She was a member of the Taller Torres García art group which helped form the Universal Constructivism art movement.

== Biography ==
In March 2024, her work was included in an exhibition at the Juan Manuel Blanes Museum in Montevideo, Uruguay centered around the women members of the Taller Torres García art school.
