= Mario Lubetkin =

Uruguayan journalist and diplomat

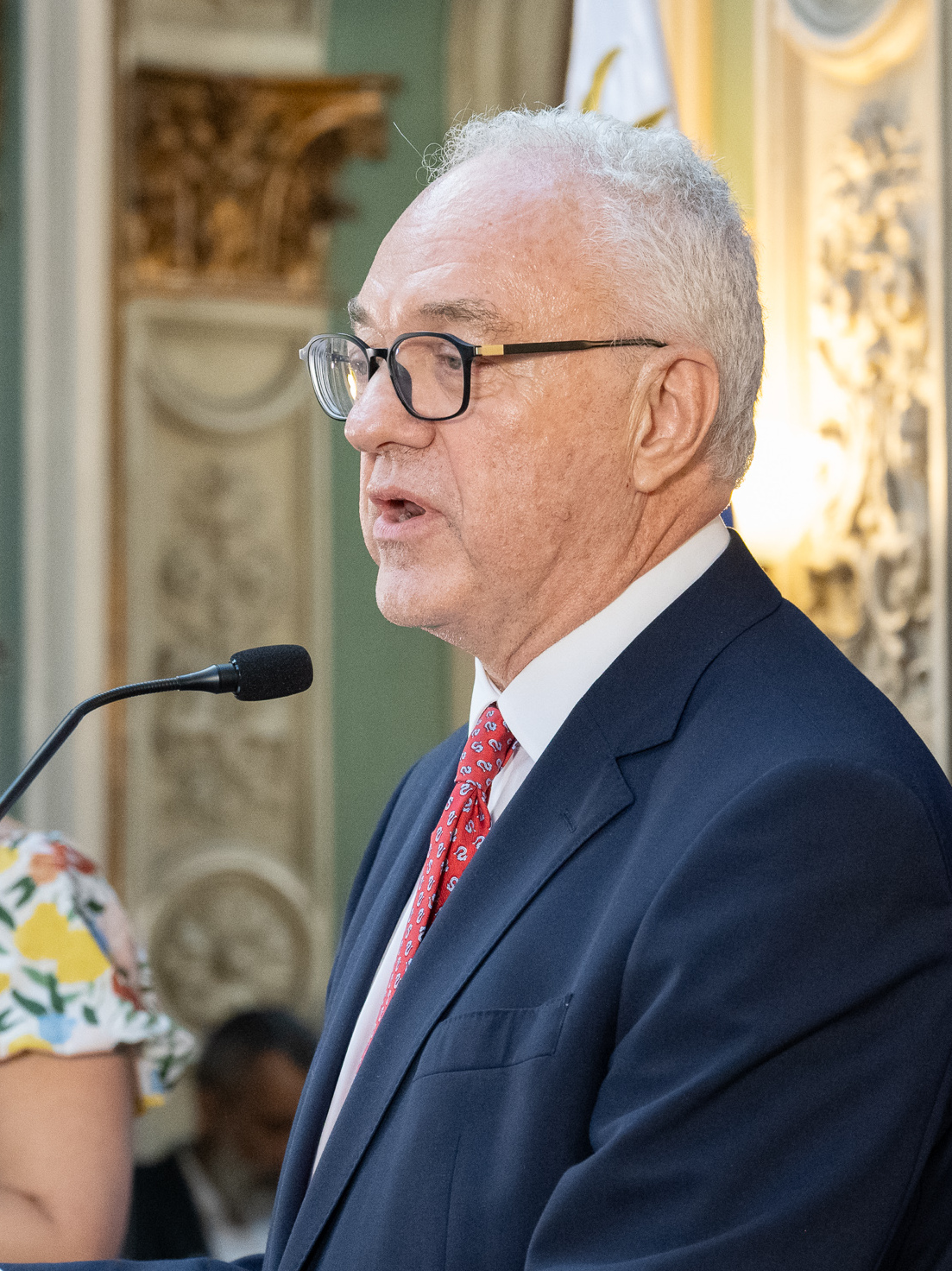
- Mario Lubetkin in 2025

Minister of Foreign Relations of Uruguay
- Incumbent
- Assumed office 1 March 2025
- President: Yamandú Orsi
- Preceded by: Omar Paganini

Personal details
- Born: Mario Israel Lubetkin Tulbovic; 13 December 1959 (age 66) Montevideo, Uruguay
- Citizenship: Uruguay; Italy; Lithuania
- Occupation: Journalist; politician

Mario Israel Lubetkin Tulbovic (born 13 December 1959) is a Uruguayan politician and journalist, specializing in sustainable development. He is currently serving as Minister of Foreign Relations in the government of Yamandú Orsi.

== Early life ==
Lubetkin was born in Montevideo in 1959 to a Jewish family. His father was a Ukrainian immigrant with Lithuanian citizenship, and his mother was a Lithuanian immigrant; both having settled in Uruguay at an early age. He was raised in the La Blanqueada neighborhood and attended local public schools, including Liceo Dámaso Antonio Larrañaga.

As a teenager, he joined the youth wing of the Communist Party of Uruguay. In 1976, during Uruguay’s civic-military dictatorship, his father took him to Buenos Aires, Argentina. Following the coup d’état in Argentina, he applied at the Italian embassy in Buenos Aires to leave for Rome, where his brother was residing.

== Career ==
Lubetkin has been active at Inter Press Service since 1977, and served as its director from 2002 to 2014. He lectured Communications in Foreign Relations and Development at the IULM University of Milan, and directed seminars in Communication for Development at Menéndez Pelayo International University.

In 2014 he was appointed director for Institutional Communication at the Food and Agriculture Organization. A year later he became the director of the Director-General's cabinet and in 2017 he was appointed assistant director general of that organization. In 2022, Qu Dongyu appointed Lubetkin to the post of regional representative for Latin America and the Caribbean. Lubetkin also contributed as a columnist to the newspaper la diaria.

Lubetkin was appointed Minister of Foreign Relations on 1 March 2025. He is affiliated with the Broad Front coalition, but is not an active member of any party.

== Personal life ==
Lubetkin holds triple nationality, apart from Uruguay also holding citizenship of Italy and Lithuania.

== Honours and awards ==
Ribbon	Distinction	Country	Date	Location	Reference
	Commander of the Order of Merit of the Italian Republic	Italy	12 April 2016	Rome	
