= Taller Torres García =

Uruguayan art school (founded 1943)

- Years active: 1943–1963
- Location: Uruguay
- Major figures: Joaquín Torres-García
- Influences: Universal Constructivism
- Influenced: Julio Alpuy, José Gurvich, Gonzalo Fonseca

Taller Torres García (sometimes abbreviated TTG) was an organization founded by Joaquín Torres-García in Montevideo, Uruguay in 1943. It was also known as "La Escuela del Sur" ("School of the South"). He intended it to serve as a form of art education that would support young artists. The group organized exhibitions and published its own magazine. Its members included many prominent artists, such as Torres-García’s sons Augusto Torres and Horacio Torres, Julio Alpuy, José Gurvich, and Gonzalo Fonseca. The group built on the ideas of Torres-Garcia, including Universal Constructivism, and were influential in advancing modern art in Uruguay. The group later dissolved in 1963.

== Notable members ==
- Rosa Acle
- Julio Alpuy
- Elsa Andrada
- Daymán Antúnez
- Esther Barrios de Martín
- Lidya Buzio
- Josefina Canel
- Sergio de Castro
- Josep Collell
- Eva Díaz Torres
- Lola Fernández
- Gonzalo Fonseca
- María Elena García Brunel
- Luis Gentieu
- José Gurvich
- Linda Kohen
- Lilián Lipschitz
- Francisco Matto
- María Esther Mendy
- María Julia Monti
- Andrés Moskovics
- Amalia Nieto
- Teresa Olascuaga
- Raquel Orzuj
- Manuel Pailós
- Juan Pardo
- Olga Piria
- Angelina de la Quintana
- Héctor Ragni
- Esther Rela
- Alceu Ribeiro
- Lía Rivas
- Quela Rovira
- Lily Salvo
- Luis San Vicente
- Daniel de los Santos
- Augusto Torres, Torres-García’s son
- Horacio Torres, Torres-García’s son
