= Ida Holz =

Uruguayan engineer and researcher

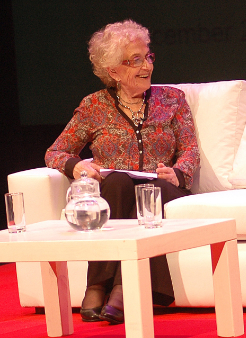
- Born: Ida Holz Bard; 30 January 1935 (age 91); Montevideo, Uruguay
- Education: University of the Republic
- Occupations: Engineer, computer scientist, professor, researcher
- Spouse: Anhelo Hernández Ríos (m. 1964; died 2010)
- Children: Arauco, Ayara
- Awards: LACNIC Lifetime Achievement Award; Internet Hall of Fame; Girdle of Honor; Outstanding Personality stamp

Ida Holz Bard (born 30 January 1935) is a Uruguayan engineer, computer scientist, professor, and researcher, known as a pioneer in the field of computing and the Internet.

== Early life and education ==
Holz Bard was born on 30 January 1935, in the Palermo neighbourhood of Montevideo, to Galician Jewish immigrants Débora Bard and Isaac Holz. Her mother came from an Orthodox family and settled in Uruguay in the late 1920s; her maternal grandparents and maternal uncles were rabbis. Her father died when she was four years old, while her mother was eight months pregnant with her brother. Both of her parents had relatives who perished in the Holocaust.

She attended public schools and, during her adolescence, was involved in several Jewish associations in Montevideo, including HaNoar HaTzioni. At the age of seventeen, she moved to Israel, where she lived on a kibbutz and completed her military service. Four years later, she returned to Uruguay and began teacher training in mathematics at the Instituto de Profesores Artigas, later enrolling in a computing course at the University of the Republic. She belonged to one of the first cohorts of computer science students in Uruguay.

== Career ==
In 1976, during the civic-military dictatorship in Uruguay, she went into exile in Mexico with her husband and children. There, she worked at the Mexican General Directorate of Economic and Social Policy and later at the country's National Institute of Statistics. The Mexican government offered her its directorship, but she had already decided to return to Uruguay.

In 1986, she was appointed director of the Central Information Service (SECIU) of the University of the Republic, following a competitive selection process. In this role, she led the development of the Internet in Uruguay beginning in the early 1990s. Under her direction, in 1994 installed the first Internet node in the country. She subsequently contributed to the development and consolidation of information and communications technology in the country. Since 2005 she has worked in the directorate of the Agency for Development of Electronic Government and Society of Information and Knowledge. She was also one of the promoters of the Ceibal project.

Holz is recognized for having opposed a conference in Rio de Janeiro in 1991, at which the United States and Europe imposed their authorities at the Latin American level on the nascent global network.

== Personal life ==
In 1964 she married the artist Anhelo Hernández, dedicated to contemporary painting, and who joined the Torres García Workshop.

== Awards and honors ==
Ida Holz received the 2009 Lifetime Achievement Award, granted by the Latin America and Caribbean Network Information Centre (LACNIC) to people who have contributed to the permanent development of the Internet.

In 2013 she was the first Latin American personality (male or female) to enter the Internet Society's Hall of Fame, an initiative that honors people who have been important to the development and strengthening of the Internet.

The Board of Initial and Primary Education awarded her its 2014 Girdle of Honor at public school No. 4 José Artigas, where the engineer completed her primary studies.

The National Postal Administration issued stamps in 2015 of the series "Outstanding Personalities of Uruguay" dedicated to Ida Holz.

In 2017, Holz received a recognition in honor of her career as an Internet pioneer in Uruguay, in the framework of the Ceibal project's tenth anniversary celebration.

One of the so-called "fathers of the Internet", Vint Cerf, when asked if there was a "mother of the Internet", responded:

Yes, there is a mother of the Internet, and her name is Ida Holz.

== Legacy ==
During the 2025 winter season, the children's play Ida: La madre de Internet, written and directed by playwright Melanie Catan and based on Holz's life and career, premiered. The play received the Florencio Award for Best Educational Content Production, while its lead actress, Soledad Lacassy, received the award for Best Actress. The play was revived in 2026.

In December 2025, Uruguay's National Agency for Research and Innovation (ANII) established a new research fund named after her. The fund was created as an instrument to finance long-term research projects across all fields of science, providing full funding for a period of five years, as well as doctoral and postdoctoral fellowships.
