= Quela Rovira =

Uruguayan painter and sculptor (1917–2014)

- Born: María Celia Rovira; 1917; Montevideo, Uruguay
- Died: 2014 (aged 96–97); Montevideo, Uruguay
- Other name: Quela Rovira
- Education: Taller Torres García
- Occupations: Painter, sculptor, educator, writer

María Celia "Quela" Rovira (Montevideo, 1917 - 2014) was a Uruguayan painter, sculptor, and art teacher who was a member of the Taller Torres García art school.

== Career ==
During high school, Rovira studied drawing under Carmelo de Arzadun before attending classes at the Taller Torres García art school under Joaquín Torres García. Rovira graduated as a teacher in 1936 and she dedicated herself to working on teaching plastic expression in public schools along with her colleagues María Mercedes Antelo and Bell Clavelli. As a result of these years of working with children, an Exhibition of Children's Drawings was held at the Subte Exhibition Center in 1947.

She was a student in Guillermo Laborde's workshop until the year of his death in 1940.

In 1942 she entered the Taller Torres García art school until 1946. In this workshop she joined the group that created the Saint Bois Murals at the Hospital Saint Bois. Her mural was titled The School and was completed in 1944.

She opened the Losada art gallery in Montevideo in 1960 where she held exhibitions of Uruguayan authors and artists from other countries, highlighting an exhibition of paintings by Rafael Alberti especially.

== Works ==
=== Murals ===
- 1944, The School . Mural in the Martirené Pavilion of the Saint Bois Hospital (189 x 272cm)

=== Written ===
- 1994, Art: Visual communication. Methodology and future dimension . Amalia Polleri, María Celia Rovira. Montevideo: Banda Oriental.
- 1982, The plastic graphic language: Fundamentals and new approaches: Manual for teachers, students and artists . Amalia Polleri, María Celia Rovira, Brenda Lissardy. Montevideo: Edilyr Uruguaya.
