= Lidya Buzio =

Uruguayan-born American ceramist

- Born: 1948; Montevideo, Uruguay
- Died: September 30, 2014 (aged 65–66); Greenport, New York, United States
- Other names: Lydia Buzio
- Occupations: Ceramist, visual artist
- Known for: Ceramics, pottery, sculpture
- Website: lidyabuzio.com

Lidya Buzio (1948 – September 30, 2014) was an Uruguayan-born American ceramist, potter, and sculptor.

== Biography ==
Lidya Buzio was born in 1948, in Montevideo, Uruguay. Her father was a descent from Italian artisans.

Buzio studied with artists of the Taller Torres García in Montevideo, including José Montes, José Collell, and Guillermo Fernandez. She moved to New York City in 1971; in the 1990s she moved again, to the North Fork of Long Island. She crafted mainly burnished black pots onto which she would paint scenes of New York rooftops.

Buzio died of cancer at her home in Greenport, Long Island, aged 65 and survived by her husband, sister and two brothers.

Examples of Buzio's work are in the collections of the Smithsonian American Art Museum; the Arizona State University Art Museum; the Berkeley Art Museum; the Brooklyn Museum; the Everson Museum of Art; the Hallmark Art Collection; the Honolulu Academy of Art; the Long Beach Museum of Art; the Los Angeles County Museum of Art; the M. H. de Young Memorial Museum; the Museum of Fine Arts, Houston; the Taipei Fine Arts Museum; the National Taiwan Museum of Fine Arts; the National Museum of History in Taipei; the Nelson-Atkins Museum of Art; the Nerman Museum of Contemporary Art; the Racine Art Museum; the Rhode Island School of Design Museum; the Spencer Museum of Art; the University of Iowa Museum of Art; and the Victoria and Albert Museum.
