= Folksblat (Montevideo) =

Yiddish-language Uruguayan newspaper

- Type: Daily
- Editor: Berl Reznicovich, Moisés Orzuj
- Founded: 1931
- Ceased publication: 1964
- Political alignment: Zionist
- Language: Yiddish language
- Headquarters: 1911 Andes, Montevideo
- Circulation: 8,000 (late 1950s)

Folksblat ('People's Newspaper') was a Yiddish-language daily published in Uruguay 1931–1964. It had a Zionist orientation.

The newspaper was founded as Der tog ('The Day'). It was the first Jewish daily newspaper in the country. Its offices were located at 1911 Andes in downtown Montevideo. Berl Reznicovich and Moisés Orzuj, the father of artist Raquel Orzuj, were the editors of Der tog. Zoma Baitler was the linotypist for the newspaper.

In 1933 it changed name to Der uruguayer tog ('The Uruguayan Day'). In 1935 it took the name Folksblat. As of the late 1950s, it was estimated to have a circulation of 8,000. It was published as a morning daily, except on Mondays. The newspaper was closed down in 1964.
