= Eva Díaz Torres =

Uruguayan ceramicist

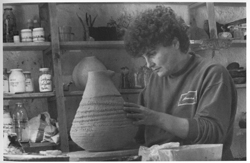
- Born: 1943; Tarrasa, Barcelona, Spain
- Died: February 14, 1993 (aged 49–50); Montevideo, Uruguay
- Citizenship: Uruguay
- Education: Taller Torres García
- Occupation: Ceramicist
- Style: Raku ware

Eva Díaz Torres (1943 – 14 February 1993) was a Uruguayan ceramicist, who specialised in the production of Raku ware. A member of the Tupamaros, she was imprisoned for her political beliefs from 1972 to 1974.

== Biography ==
Díaz was born in Tarrasa, Barcelona in 1943. She was the daughter of the sculptor Eduardo Díaz Yepes (es) and Olimpia Torres (es), and the granddaughter of the master of constructivism Joaquín Torres García. She emigrated with her family to Paris in 1946, and returned to Montevideo in 1947, settling in Uruguay.

In 1958 her interest in ceramics began and she entered the Torres García Workshop, where she received training from the painter and ceramicist José Gurvich. Whilst there she also took classes with the Catalan potter Josep Collell.

Díaz's concern for social justice drove her to join the Movimiento de Liberación Nacional-Tupamaros. In 1972 she was arrested and prosecuted by the military dictatorship. She was confined in a detention centre for political prisoners until the end of 1974. After being released from prison, she emigrated with his family first to Costa Rica for a brief stay, and then to Barcelona.

In 1985 she returned to Uruguay, where she once again set up a workshop. She worked with various techniques, developing research and analysis in ceramic and enamel techniques. She presented her work in collective exhibitions and in a solo show at the Exhibition Hall of the Municipal Palace of Montevideo. during this period, Díaz expanded her knowledge of and experimentation with Raku ware, developing a series of sculptural pieces and becoming a prominent Uruguayan exponent of the technique.

Díaz died in Montevideo on 14 February 1993.

== Legacy ==
In 2009, a retrospective of Díaz's work was held at the Torres García Museum. In March 2018, an anthological exhibition of Díaz's work was held at the Gurvich Museum in Montevideo. Curated by her daughters Jimena, a curator, and Micaela Perera Díaz, the show featured fifty ceramics from her rakú technique body of work.
