= Ricardo Ehrlich =

Uruguayan biologist and political figure

Ing. Ricardo Mario Ehrlich
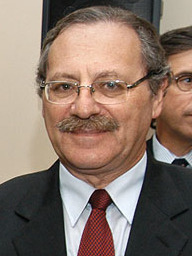
- Ehrlich in 2007

Municipal Intendant of Montevideo
- In office April 1, 2005 – 2010
- President: Tabaré Vázquez
- Preceded by: Mariano Arana
- Succeeded by: Hyara Rodríguez

Personal details
- Born: Ricardo Mario Ehrlich Szalmian; November 4, 1948 (age 77) Montevideo, Uruguay
- Party: Broad Front
- Spouse: Verónica Etchart
- Children: 2
- Education: Université Louis Pasteur
- Occupation: Biologist; biochemist; politician
- Awards: Premio Legión del Libro

Ricardo Mario Ehrlich Szalmian (born 4 November 1948) is a Uruguayan biologist and politician. A member of the Broad Front, he served as Intendant of Montevideo from 2005 to 2010 and as Minister of Education and Culture from 2010 to 2015.

== Early life and education ==
Ricardo Ehrlich was born in Montevideo to Polish Jewish parents. He was raised in the Cerrito neighbourhood and attended public schools, including Liceo Dámaso Antonio Larrañaga.

From an early age, he became involved in far-left revolutionary groups. In 1973, he went into exile in Buenos Aires, where he worked as a chemical technician. A year later, he moved to Strasbourg, where he completed a Master of Science degree at the Université Louis-Pasteur. Five years thereafter, he was awarded a doctorate in Physical Sciences.

== Political career ==
From 2005 until 2010 he was Intendant (styled Intendente Municipal in Uruguayan vernacular Spanish) of Montevideo. He is from the prominent local Jewish community.

By profession Ehrlich is a leading biochemist in Uruguay.

In 2005 Ehrlich stood for the leftist Frente Amplio in Montevideo's departmental elections and won, gaining 60.9% of the vote. His nearest rival, for the Colorado Party, was Pedro Bordaberry, a son of former President Juan Maria Bordaberry, who scored 26.9%.

He was longlisted for the 2008 World Mayor award.

On March 1, 2010, new president José Mujica appointed him Minister of Education.
