= Liceo Dámaso Antonio Larrañaga =

Coordinates: 34.8874°S 56.1543°W

Dámaso Antonio Larrañaga Lyceum
- Liceo Dámaso Antonio Larrañaga
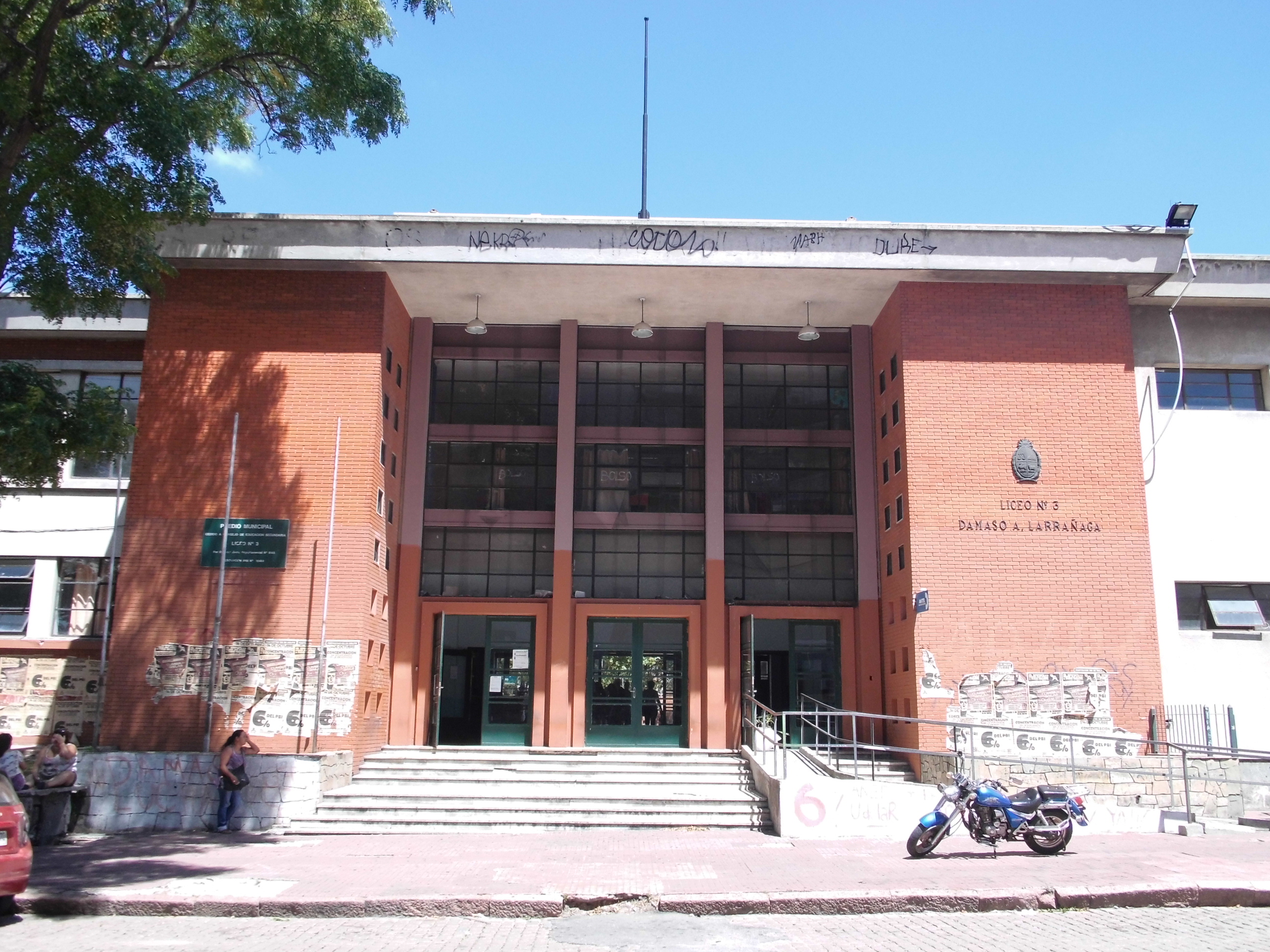
- Liceo Dámaso Antonio Larrañaga in 2016

Location
- 2878 Jaime Cibils St. La Blanqueada, Montevideo; Uruguay

Information
- Other name: Liceo No. 3 de Montevideo
- Type: Public secondary
- Established: 1928
- Gender: Coeducational
- Nickname: El Dámaso

Liceo Dámaso Antonio Larrañaga, officially designated Liceo No. 3 of Montevideo, is a public secondary school in Montevideo, Uruguay. Located in the La Blanqueada neighbourhood, it is named after Uruguayan priest and botanist Dámaso Antonio Larrañaga, one of the founders of the National Library of Uruguay and the University of the Republic. The school provides education across all six years of secondary education (Years 7–12) and is among the largest secondary schools in Uruguay.

== History ==
Liceo Dámaso Antonio Larrañaga was established by law in 1928, becoming the third public secondary school in Montevideo. It was initially located on Paysandú Street in the city centre until 1955, when it relocated to the building constructed between 1951 and 1955. The structure was designed by architects José Scheps and Rogelio de Pro, who was then serving as the institution’s principal. The building was declared a National Historic Monument in 2015.

Seven former students of the school were victims of repression during the civic–military dictatorship (1973–1985): Andrés Bellizzi, Nelson González, Rafael Lezama, José Michelena, Rubén Prieto and Helios Serra. Of these, Prieto, Bellizzi, Michelena and Serra were forcibly disappeared in Argentina. In 2008, a monument was installed in their honour.

Since 2006, Espacio Salud has operated as a counselling centre for students with problematic drug use. It is staffed by students and faculty members of the Faculty of Nursing of the University of the Republic who specialise in adolescent health.

== Notable alumni ==
- Washington Abdala – lawyer and politician
- Julio Alpuy – sculptor
- Ricardo Ehrlich – botanist and politician
- Mario Lubetkin – politician and journalist
- Ángel Rama – author and academic
- Dahd Sfeir – actress
- Vivian Trías – politician ans StB spy
