= Fanny Carrió =

- Born: Francisca Emilia Carrió Sierra; 3 December 1879; Pando, Uruguay
- Other name: Fafhm
- Political party: Colorado Party
- Spouse: Félix Polleri Burgueño (1907–1945)
- Children: Amalia Polleri
- Parents: Vicente Carrió García (father); Emilia Sierra (mother)

Francisca Emilia "Fanny" Carrió Sierra (born 3 December 1879; date of death unknown) was an active Uruguayan liberal feminist.

== Life and career ==
The daughter of Emilia Sierra and Vicente Carrió García, Fanny Carrió married Félix Polleri Burgueño on 9 May 1907. The couple had six children, among them artist Amalia Polleri. Both Carrió and her husband were members of the Colorado Party, in the Riverista sector.

She was secretary general of the National Women's Council of Uruguay (CONAMU), the Uruguayan branch of the International Council of Women. On her initiative, said council presented to the Chamber of Representatives a bill that recognized the right of women to vote and run in municipal and national elections.

In 1919, Paulina Luisi organized the Uruguayan Women's Alliance for Women's Suffrage. In the Statutory General Assembly corresponding to Fiscal Year 1919–1920, held on 3 December 1920, Carrió was named president of the organization's Suffrage Commission. Later she would be its president, working tirelessly with Luisi for women's suffrage in Uruguay.

In parallel, she was also the president of the Press Commission of CONAMU. She wrote a weekly column titled "Para nosotras" in the Montevideo newspaper La Mañana, directed by her husband. She used the pseudonym Fafhm, formed by the initials of her five children at the time. In a report of the Press Commission presented to CONAMU, Carrió explained:

The section cited has appeared once or twice a week without interruption, trying to interest our women in the various feminist problems, without departing from the femininity that we believe should enhance and bring prestige at all times to the work of feminism.

According to Christine Ehrick, in her articles, "her discourse centered on two main points: women's vote as part of the process of historical evolution, and defending feminism against charges of being anti-male or anti-family." Also, through her column, she actively participated in the campaign of the National Alliance of Women so that women could occupy government positions related to social assistance and education.

The place and date of Carrió's death are unknown.
