= Museum of Pre-Columbian and Indigenous Art =

Museo de Arte Precolombino e Indígena
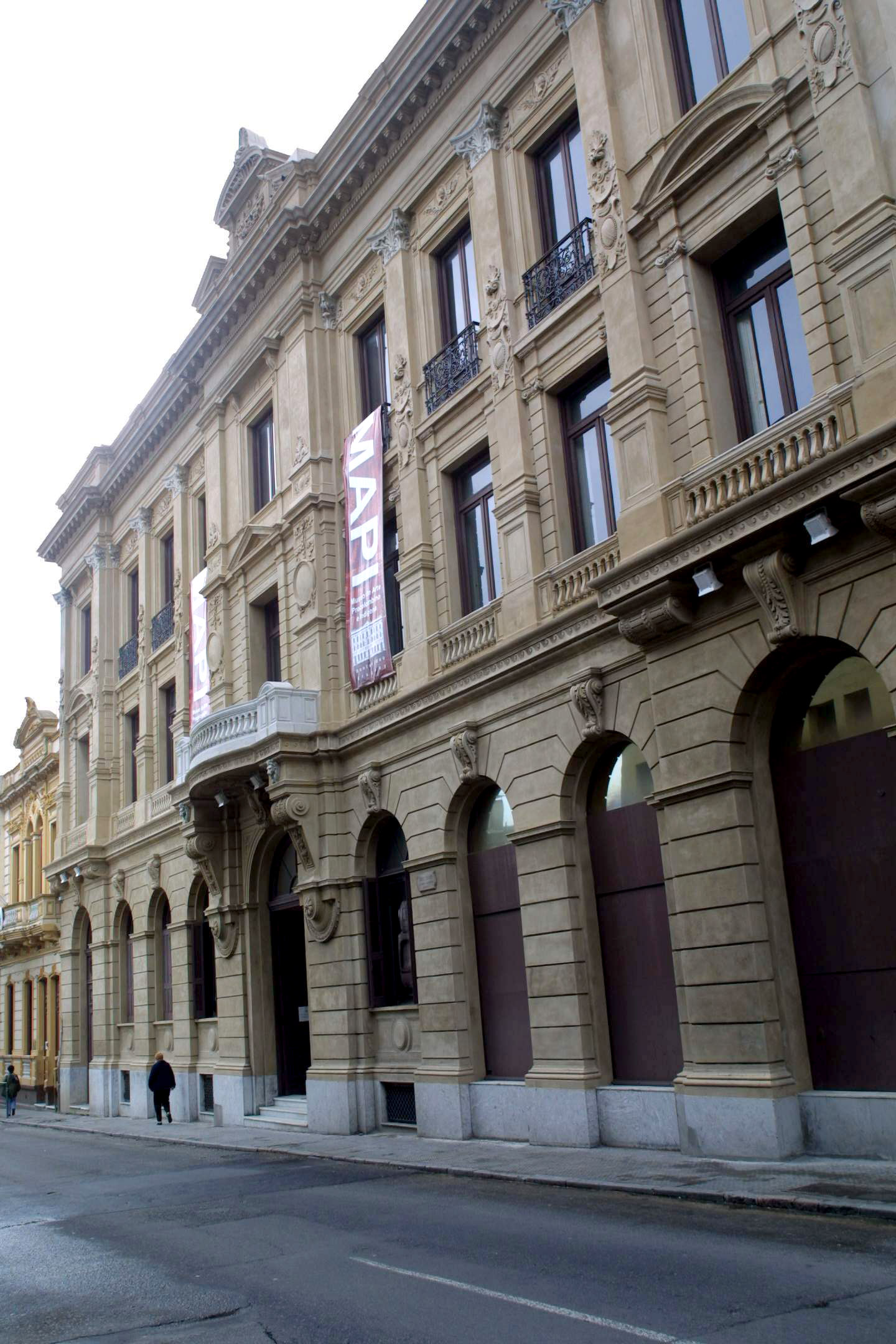
- Building façade
- Interactive fullscreen map
- Established: September 17, 2004; 21 years ago
- Location: Montevideo, Uruguay
- Coordinates: 34°54′27″S 56°12′37″W
- Type: Ethnographic museum
- Website: mapi.uy

The Museum of Pre-Columbian and Indigenous Art (Spanish: Museo de Arte Precolombino e Indígena) is an ethnographic museum located in Ciudad Vieja, Montevideo, Uruguay, dedicated to the indigenous cultures of different parts of Latin America.

== History ==
At the end of the 19th century, the building was planned by Emilio Reus together with two German architects, with the intention of being a hydrothermal medical establishment, In 1888, the building was constructed and in 1986, the building was declared a National Historic Monument. The building was used as the headquarters of the Ministry of National Defense, until at some point the building was abandoned. In 2004, the building was renovated and the museum was established. In 2013, the museum was incorporated into the Google Arts & Culture platform.

== Collections ==
The museum has more than 700 exhibits on ethnographic or archeological themes. The museum mainly focuses on the culture of the indigenous people in Uruguay, but there are also exhibits on other parts of Latin America, among them, there is the Mesoamerica region, which includes Mexico and Guatemala, the intermediate region which includes Colombia and Ecuador, this section is about the Cuasmal, Capulí and Tuncahuán cultures, there are also exhibits on the Andean Region that includes Peru and western Bolivia, there is also the South Andean region, which includes Chile and a small part of Argentina. Among the museum's exhibits are textiles, traditional musical instruments, ceramics and art. The museum also has exhibits on the indigenous people of the Amazon and the Plata River basin.
