= Šančiai =

Subdistrict of Kaunas, Lithuania

Coordinates: 54°52′43″N 23°56′35″E

- Eldership
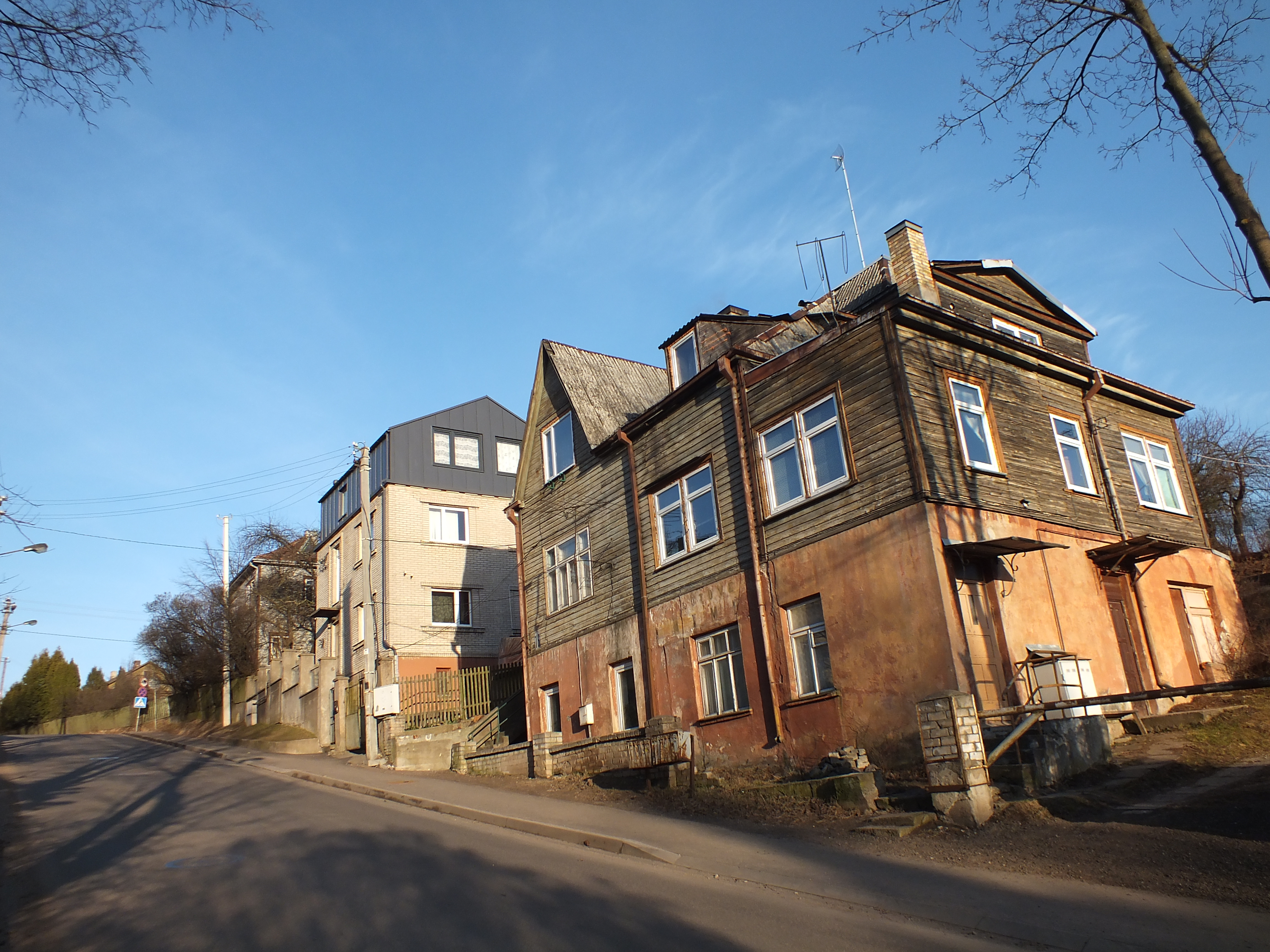
- Old houses in Šančiai

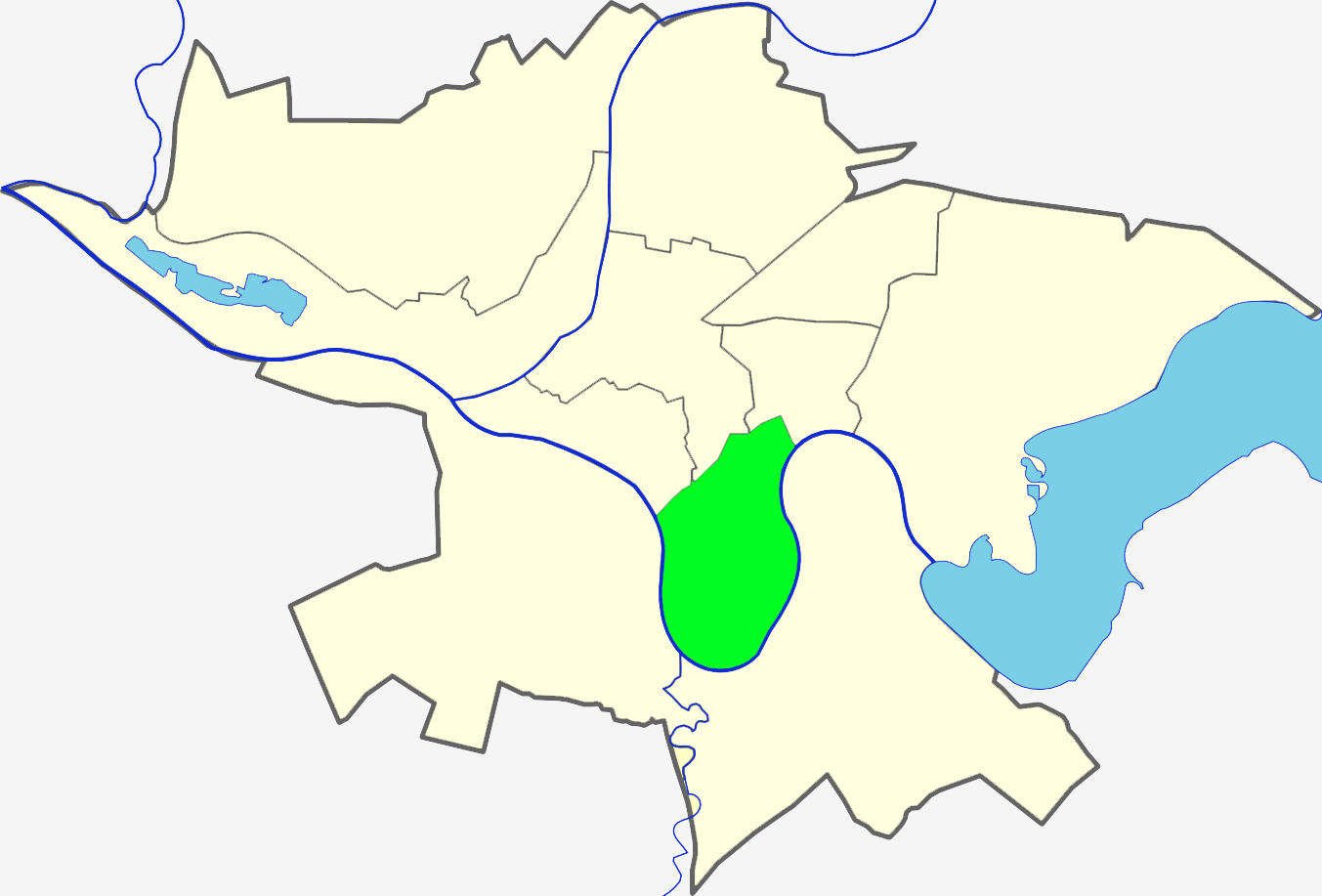
- Location of Šančiai within Kaunas
- Country: Lithuania
- County: Kaunas County
- Municipality: Kaunas city municipality

Area
  - Total: 7.41 km^{2} (2.86 sq mi)

Population (2021)
  - Total: 18,954
  - Density: 2,560/km^{2} (6,620/sq mi)
- Time zone: UTC+2 (EET)
  - Summer (DST): UTC+3 (EEST)

Šančiai is an elderate in the Lithuanian city of Kaunas. It is located on the meandering right bank of the Nemunas River. Šančiai itself are divided into Žemieji Šančiai (or Lower Šančiai) and Aukštieji Šančiai (or Upper Šančiai) neighborhoods. Names come from their adjacent locations. Žemieji Šančiai is located in the Nemunas River valley, while Aukštieji Šančiai is located on the hill above the valley. Its entire elderate population of 2007 was 23,237.

Remains of transatlantic pilots of Lituanica Steponas Darius and Stasys Girėnas were reburied in the cemetery of Šančiai, after Kaunas Old Cemetery (also known as Kaunas Carmelite Cemetery) was liquidated by soviet authorities.

From November 1943, until July 8, 1944, there was a German Forced labour camp in Šančiai. which was a subcamp of the SS-run KZ Kauen, located at the site of the former Kovno Ghetto.

== Etymology ==
Before the Napoleonic Wars ( 1812 ), there were two villages between Panemune and Kaunas, on the site of the current Šančiai: Pašilė and Baibokai. They both belonged to the Jesuits. In the summer of 1812, the French crossed the Nemunas at the present-day Šančiai: they built fortifications here, and the term for them was in French chantiers - "structures", German Schanze - "earthworks"). In the 1870s, there was a small settlement called Šancais, whose name was further Lithuanized to Šančiai.

== Notable people ==
- Zoma Baitler (1908-1994), Uruguayan artist and diplomat, was born in Šančiai
