= Museo Gurvich =

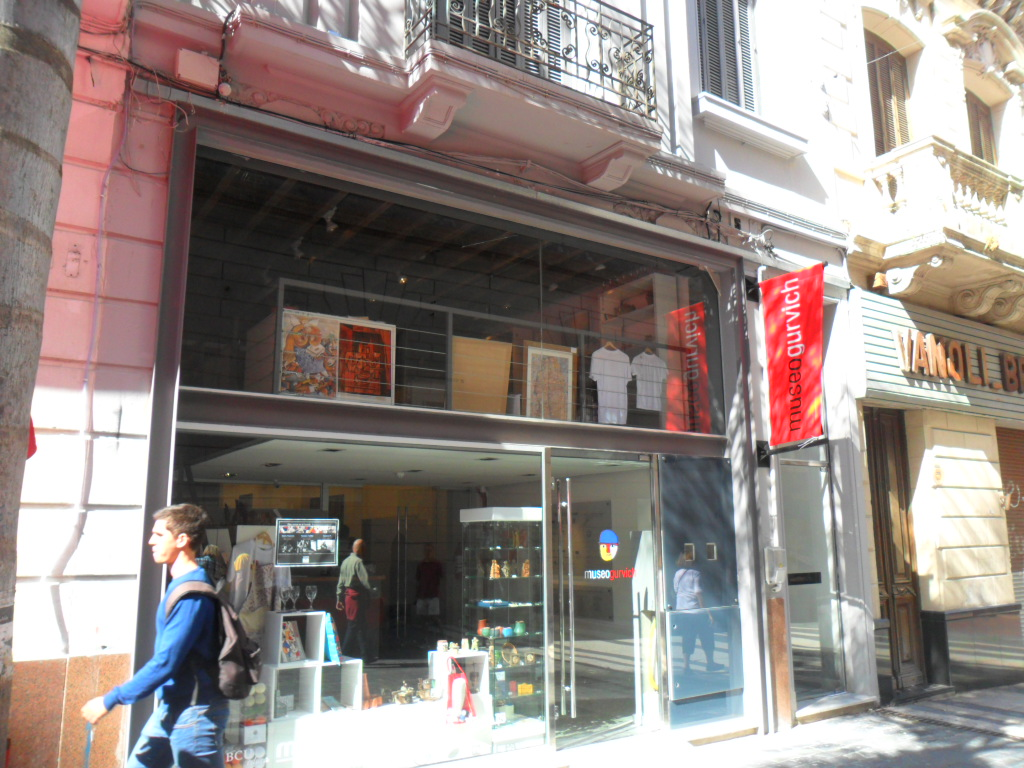
Façade of Museo Gurvich

Museo Gurvich is an art museum in Montevideo, Uruguay, dedicated to preserving the art of José Gurvich, an important Constructivist painter, founded in 2001. It opened to the public in 2005.
