= Antonio Pena =

Uruguayan sculptor

Antonio Pena (3 December 1894 in Montevideo – 7 December 1947) was a Uruguayan sculptor.
