= La República (Uruguay) =

Newspaper in Uruguay

- Type: Daily newspaper
- Founded: 3 May 1988
- Political alignment: Centre-left
- Headquarters: Montevideo, Uruguay
- Website: La República

La República is a Uruguayan newspaper, first published on 3 May 1988, and distributed nationwide. It was established by Federico Fasano Mertens. Its website is ranked 251st in Uruguay according to Alexa.
