= Renée Pietrafesa Bonnet =

Uruguayan composer and pianist (1938–2022)

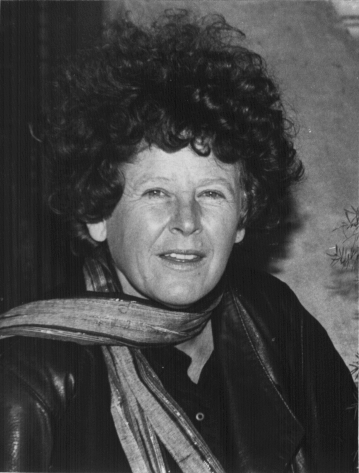
- Pietrafesa circa 1990

Background information
- Born: 17 December 1938; Montevideo, Uruguay
- Died: 3 February 2022 Montevideo, Uruguay
- Genres: electroacoustic, avant-garde, classical
- Occupations: Composer, Pianist, Organist, Harpsichordist, Conductor
- Years active: 1946–2022
- Labels: Sondor, Ayuí / Tacuabé, AGADU
- Website: Official website

Renée Pietrafesa Bonnet (17 December 1938 – 3 February 2022) was a French and Uruguayan composer, pianist, organist, harpsichordist and conductor. Her compositions spanned both popular and classical genres which included Electroacoustic music.

== Life and career ==
Born in 1938 in Montevideo, Uruguay, Pietrafesa began her musical studies with her mother, pianist and pedagogue Renée Bonnet. She attended courses taught by Jörg Demus and Héctor Tosar, developing her skills as both a composer and a performer.

She founded the Chorale de l'Alliance Française and the Montevideo Ars musicæ Chamber Orchestra which tours in Uruguay and the whole of Latin America and organized the 1st Montevideo Open Air Chamber Music Festival.

In 1973-74, she held French government grants, and performed electroacoustic researched at the GRM of Paris under the direction of Pierre Schæffer, and studied direction of orchestra with J. Mercier. In 1975-77, she directed the first Atelier musical d'initiation à la musique électroacoustique of the Centre Culturel Censier of the University of Paris and the Ensemble instrumental des Boursiers Etrangers (France). She performed at the Musée d’Art Moderne of Paris and participated in numerous broadcasts from France Culture at Paris. In 1976, Eva Houdova's film Renée Pietrafesa, composer and performer was given an award at the Festival de Besançon.

In 1984, she was named « Chevalier des Arts et des Lettres » and received at Montevideo the “Florencio” award from the Uruguayan Theatre Critic for the music to Sophocles's Electra.

In 1990, she was invited by the French Government as a composer and a teacher. From 1991 onward, she collaborated as a composer and a pedagogue in the France-Uruguay exchanges. In that area, she has given several Master-Classes in French academies of music such as the CNR of Strasbourg, which invited her to teach and direct her works. She was invited too by the Deutscher Musikrat (German Music Council, a member of the International Music Council), in Italy, in Spain as well as in Brasil and in Argentina.

In 1997, she performed the Por la vida concert at the Teatro Solís of Montevideo, with the collaboration of UNICEF of Uruguay and the participation of an orchestra of 100 musicians, 5 choruses of adults and the children's chorus Coro de niños del Iname, in order to raise funds for homeless children in Uruguay.

In 1999, during annual rounds in Europe, she performed with Luis Battle, in París and Rome, playing works of the universal repertory and of her own vintage. She also directed Master Classes in various academies of France by carrying out concerts of works of Latino-American masterpieces interpreted by European orchestras. The same year, she gave the premiere in Montevideo of her work, Desde la Cruz del Sur, with the OSSODRE orchestra.

In 2000, she took part in the Festival Paris-Banlieues-Tango. From 24 November 2001, there were simultaneous productions of at least 4 of her musical works in Montevideo.

In 2001, she presented her new CD, "Mutabile", published by Ayuí / Tacuabé and Fonam of Montevideo. She was named Uruguay's "Woman of the Year, 2001" in the category of the Best Musical Show and won the Price Florencio, 2001 for "El Hermano Olvidado" of Ariel Mastandrea, directed by Nelly Goitiño.

In 2002, she was invited in France to carry out concerts and recordings of her works for piano within the 15th Video Moments of Manosque and to also give in Paris piano concerts of Latino-American composers. She carried out a round of concerts as pianist and as head of the orchestra "Ars Musicæ", within Uruguay and directed on two occasions the Orchestra of SODRE of Montevideo in works of Bach, Mozart and Schubert and her own composition "Desde la Cruz del Sur" in its version 2002, and premiered at the time of various concerts in Montevideo "Para piano y encordado 2002", "Para piano preparado y amplificado 2002", "Evocación para piano y orquesta de Cámara" and "Canción a Federico 2002".

For her development, she received the "Morosoli 2005" award " of the Fundación Lolita Rubial (November 2005).

She was a member of the S.U.M.C. and the N.M.N. of Montevideo and was regularly invited to direct the Orquesta Filarmónica de Montevideo and the Orquesta Sinfónica del SODRE de Montevideo.

She was latterly the director of the Music School « Quinta del Arte » at Montevideo and directed musical TV show (“Taller de Música” on Canal 5). She taught Musical Pedagogy in the Escuela Universitaria de Música de Montevideo and directed the Grupo Barroco de Montevideo which she founded.

She recorded works by Mozart, Schubert, Brahms, and Froberger as well as her own CDs, including Mutabile (Ayuí / Tacuabé), Sondor, and piano works by Orchestra of the CNR of Strasbourg, the Ossodre and the Philharmonic Orchestra of Montevideo (see AGADU).

On 24 October 2016, Pietrafesa was designated "Illustrious Citizen of Montevideo".

== Death ==
Pietrafesa died on 3 February 2022, at the age of 83.

== Sources ==
- Renée Pietrafesa Bonnet's official website
