= Universal Constructivism =

Art movement from 1930–1970

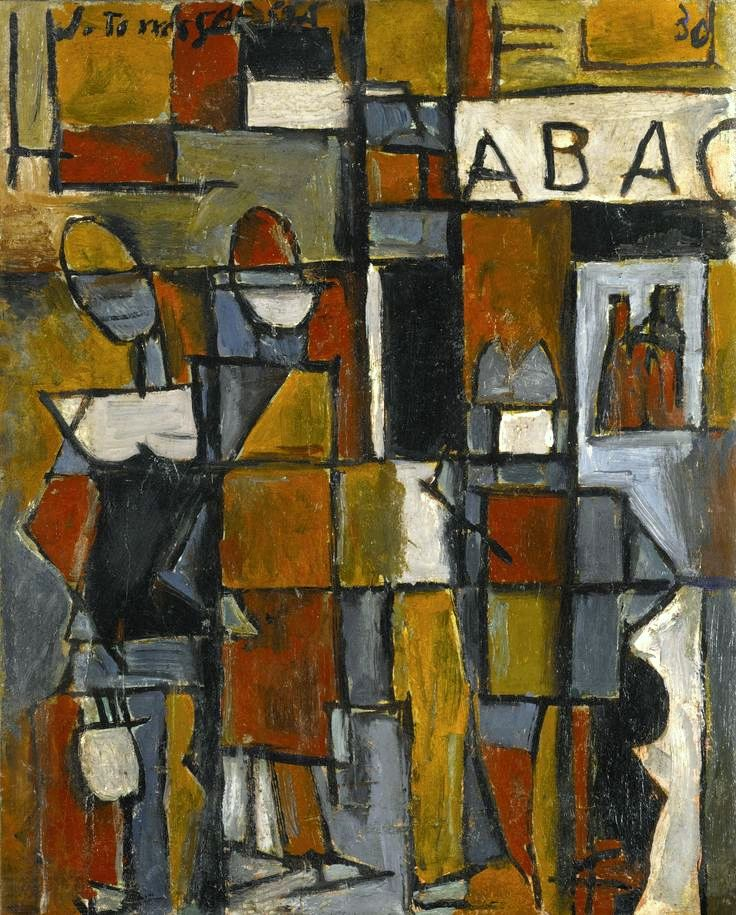
- Joaquín Torres García, Figuras sobre una estrutura, 1930
- Years active: 1930-1970
- Location: Uruguay
- Influences: Anthropophagy, Cubism, Vibrationism, Rafael Barradas, Piet Mondrian, Geometric abstraction, Concrete Art, Primitivism
- Influenced: Asociacion de Arte Constructivo, Taller Torres García, Julio Alpuy

Universal Constructivism (sometimes called Constructive Universalism) was a style of art created and developed by Joaquín Torres-García. The study and incorporation of basic geometric structure (Constructive) in the ancient and modern world creates the ability to create art that will be meaningful (Universal) to anyone who has viewed his artworks. He took the principles of Constructivism that Russian artists had developed in the 1920s and had influenced the De Stijl and Bauhaus movements and integrated what he considered to be universal pictographs, such as those for the Sun, the Moon, man, and woman. The goal of this art movement was to seek for the definition of what it means to be American by dominating constructive art and the use of primitive art that was rooted in the traditions of the continent. This style is best known for its synthesis of grid compositions and schematic signs. When Torres-García started Taller Torres García in 1944, many of the participants incorporated Universal Constructivism into their own work. And later, the style influenced North American artists, such as Adolph Gottlieb and Louise Nevelson.

== Founding of the Movement ==
=== Joaquín Torres-García ===
Joaquín Torres-García was the founder of Universal Constructivism. The Uruguayan artist was born in Montevideo on the 28th of July in the year 1874. As he grew into the path of art, he left his home and travels to Barcelona in 1891. Specifically, in Paris he found many new opportunities that have played an important factor in his career. Additionally, his travels have included a variety of influences that has inspired his art. Due to his accomplishments, he was uniquely titled as "America's Greatest Creators". Joaquin Torres-García was a determined Uruguayan artist who hoped to constitute a new world with a new set of ritual practices as a way of reconstituting the least imagined, fantasized- ancient, pre-modern integration of life and art through the principles of geometry and proportionality. Torres-García developed a unique creation to use Modern art to proclaim the spiritual Humanism expressed in Universal images rather than realistic description.

=== Influences ===
In order to portray his unique style, Torres-García had many steps of influences to reach him to the highest point of Universal Constructivism. His development echoes that of a Brazilian modernist of the 1920s, named Tarsila do Amaral, who has developed a method of “cannibalizing” other styles. Similarly, with each inspiration that Torres-García received, he created his identity by learning new techniques and styles and transforming it into a new kind of style. Uniquely, Torres-García consumed many different styles and techniques of both artworks and artists. He absorbed what interested him and mixed it with everything else he had learned to produce the style of Constructive Universalism. Additionally, Pierre Puvis de Chavannes was a French painter whom Torres-García had met while traveling. Luckily, from 1904 to 1926 he was able to meet Chavannes during the Catalan Novecentist Movement which exposed him to the style of Classicism. This style refers to ancient Greece and Rome. When applied into Torres-García's work, it contributed a sense of order for the audience or viewers. It conveyed organization and structure that enhanced his goal of having his viewers effectively understand his art. Later, he was influenced by the geometric modernist style, which emerged from Parisian Cubism and the ideas of Italian Futurism. Torres-García used this style by portraying the depiction of modern life with the use of simple forms, strong colors, contrasts, and views of multiple subjects. The Uruguayan artist used a grid-like structure to keep intact with his classical murals that he has created.

=== Elements ===
Torres-García—and thus Universal Constructivism—integrated a strong sense of organization with symbols and ideograms to convey balance, structure, and value. Torres-García developed a system of symbols that have similarities to both hieroglyphics and children's drawings in order to suggest authenticity. By creating symbols with universal meaning, his system intended to provide the experience of order, harmony, and unity. He planned to achieve a relationship with the new and the primitive, the unity of man and nature, origin and now, and its objective goal to represent the world

While traveling in Barcelona and New York, Torres-García developed his new ideas from abstract structural relationships. With the use of horizontal and vertical lines, he conveyed how it shows a smooth flow of each line, size, and shape of its canvas. He utilized a ruler and compass and began his art on a small format first which developed the proportions to transform it into a bigger artwork. Also, he used mathematical linear equations and spatial relationships as he called this the Golden Section. This method was used in ancient Greece, which has held great value to artists. This led to a harmony with the anatomy of the universe.

Moreover, Torres-García discovered abstract ideograms that were necessary to share his idea about Universalism. Ideograms were inspired by Pre-Columbian art; there was an exhibition in May 1928 called "Les Arts anciens de l'Américue" that held more than a thousand pieces of work. Uniquely, the objects had information about it that displayed the value and significance of each. At the time, he has also met Paul Rivet who was a director of the Musée ďEthnologie du Trocadéro. These influences started Torres-García's writing of ideographic scripts and drawings to display his spiritual thoughts. His ideograms took the resemblance of Egyptian hieroglyphs and images that were found in ancient culture. He develops graphic faces that is similar to the Olmec masks of the pre-Hispanic Mexico.

In addition, Torres-García used symbols to portray the art of Universal Constructivism. He included variety in his gridded artworks. Some include a sun that represents light, heat, a source of light, or the passage of time. Another is the train or ship, which displays the idea of exploration and discovery, which is related to the travels of Torres-García to America from Europe. Additionally, he drew an anchor for stability; an arrow or compass to show purposeful direction, a spiral, which is the sign of growth or change, a ladder or key that stands for a transition from one time to another; and a clock that shows changes over time. The involvement of symbols give the horizontal and vertical lines a balance with harmony that includes earth-like elements. Moreover, he includes symbols that regard man, knowledge, science, and the city. This develops the universalism in his artworks, and these were known as the "golden ration".

== Growth ==
=== Asociación de Arte Constructivo ===
Torres-García finally came back to his home after a 43-year long journey. To portray his development of Constructive Universalism, he began a projects called the Asociacion de Arte Constructivo (Association of Constructive Art). Its goal was to spread knowledge about abstraction to the country of Uruguay.

The studio was welcome to artists who were determined to learn from Torres-García. Also, they would function as the headquarters of this project. Outside of the doors would have signs saying "Nongeometers Keep Out". His determination to spread his knowledge was taken very seriously.

In the AAC, Torres-García conducted activities such as lectures and exhibitions that appealed to young artists. His leadership positively impacted the group. He encouraged twenty artists to be involved in an exhibition in October 1937. Also, the eleventh AAC exhibition involved artworks by twenty eight artists who learned under Torres-García's wing. Later, the AAC has developed a magazine entitled Circulo y Cuadrado which had a total of eight issues from 1936 to 1943.

=== Taller Torres García ===
Taller Torres García was established in 1943, approximately four years after the closing of Asociacion de Arte Constructivo. He did not stop teaching and lecturing which has caused inspired many young artists with no artistic experience, but held determination to strive in art to follow his steps. His goal of achieving a utopian accomplishment with Constructive Universalism was fascinating to viewers.

To continue his trade of work, he developed a communal workshop-school. This school was a place for young artists to strive for the combination of applied arts that also connects to an ideal environment of utopian harmony. This allowed young minds to create paintings, sculptures, ceramics, stained glass, mosaics, metalwork, and furniture. In total, they made 27 murals in Hospital Saint Bois in 1944. For Torres-García, this was more than a school in his eyes. He viewed this shop as a way to re-educate the intention of revealing pre-Columbian heritage abstraction that was forgotten.

The establishment of this workshop was during his arrival to Montevideo in 1934. Torres-García failed to gather funds from the Ministry of Education and Culture (Uruguay) to open a new school. However, he strongly felt that he could manage teaching without official support, for he was surrounded by young determined artists, which was enough for him to continue. He had the opportunity to create an academy, but would refuse the chance to do so. For this reason, he strove to maintain the original routines of Medieval and Renaissance workshops. An accomplishment he reaches is the progress of active stimulating society that shows creativity as its social norm. On the other hand, Torres-García appreciates the relationship between a teacher and student where the authority assists the students through the difficulties of finding their self-worth. In this workshop, that connection is kept. Students are mutual, meaning, they all hold lots of knowledge about art, and this causes Torres-García to believe that he has made a school that unifies. This led to the lasting influence and has later been called the School of the South.

== Artworks ==
=== Constructive Composition 16, 1943 ===
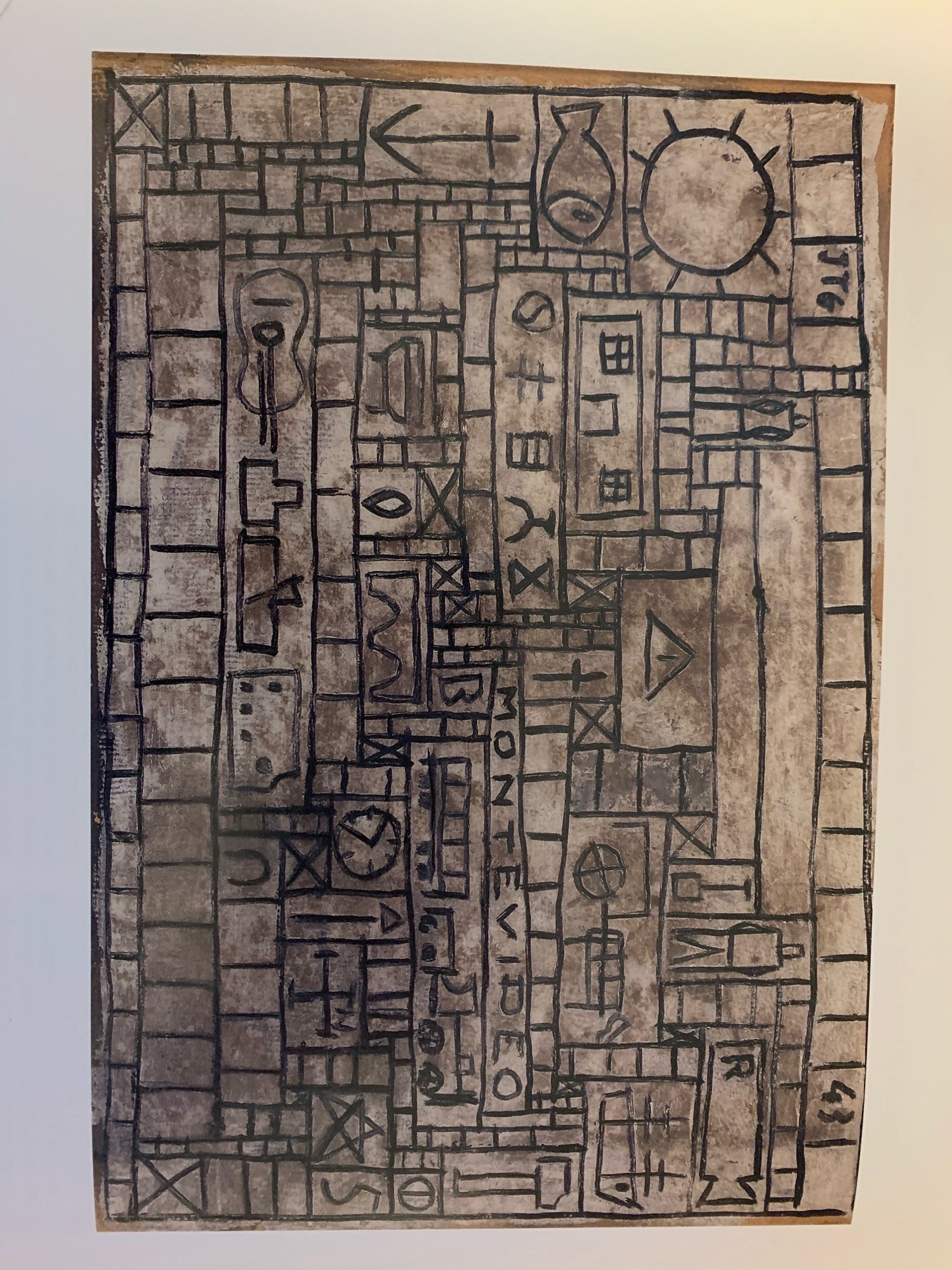
Torres-García, Constructive Composition, 1943, Uruguay

In this specific artwork, Torres-García intertwines Pre-Columbian elements, for he respected ancient artistry and cultural differences. Additionally, he manages to paint symbols that have been bought up by the Freemasonry. To dig deeper into this, he had visited a Masonic Lodge with Luis Fernández (painter) in Paris. As he studied the place he admired how the Masonry associated symbols with architectures that represent sacred beliefs. He displays subjects such as elements of Pre-Colombia, freemasonry symbolism, objects relating to contemporary life, and incorporates guidelines. The purpose of this art piece is to rebuild the relationship between artist and viewers through a geometric art tradition with the thought of going back to early human civilization.

To begin, he refers to a stone grey background. Torres-García specifies endurance and recollects the ancient monuments located in South America. On the surface he displays a pictogram of a radiating sun. It is often presented in his artworks which suggests admiration for the Inca city. Next he shows a black grid that holds organic structure that is irregular and varied. On the grid, he displays pictograms that are filled with a variety of shapes. Performing this in all his work was ritualistic.

The specific symbols that he use suggests constructive power of man and God. For example, one of his creations comes from antiquity which is the architectural structures; presented in the painting is the aqueduct and triumphal arch in the center. Additionally, he uses a builders tool such as a hammer which is located in the top right corner of this artwork. The use of the number "5" and a pentagon relates to the mundane and spiritual world. Uniquely, the implication of "Montevideo" is not only presented because that is where Torre-García is from, but to show the admiration of the shape of the word. The cross with the "N" represents Torres-García's return to Uruguay from his travels in 1934. Also, he wanted make Montevideo a major art center because this represented his goal to change the direction of the art world with South America striving for ascendancy. Lastly, it marks a time that Torres-García recommitted himself to study and proclamation of Constructive Universalism.

=== Construction in Black and White, 1938 ===
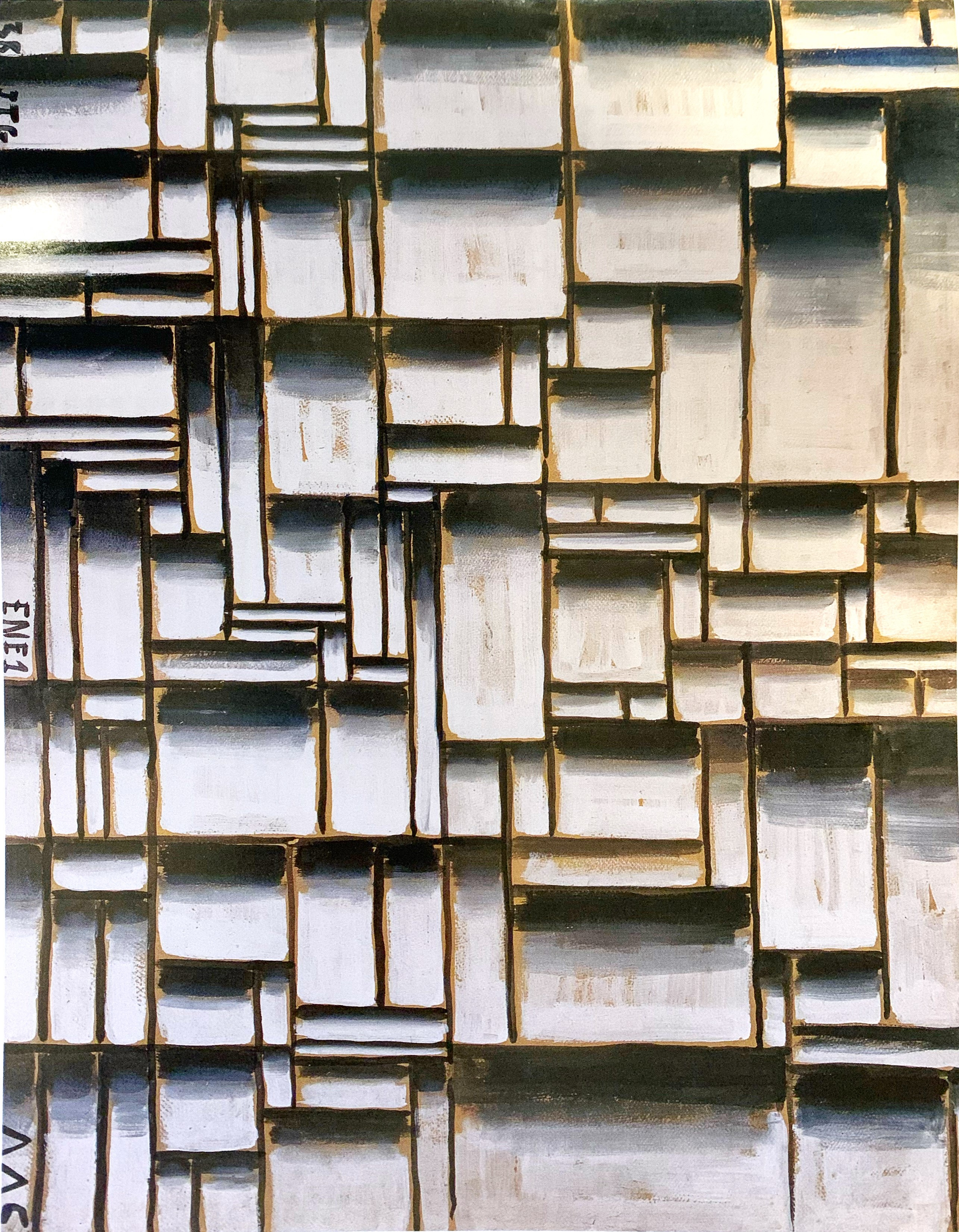
Torres-García, Construction in Black and White, 1938, Uruguay

This painting had been created four years after Torres-García returned to Uruguay from Europe.

In this artwork, Torres-García lacks symbolism in this grid, however, he displays three sets of footnote. On the lower left he writes "38" which stands for the year he has created it and his signature of initials, "JTG". Also, on the lower right of the canvas he writes AAC to identify his membership in Asociacion de Arte Constructivo, for he has founded the group. Lastly, he includes "ENE1" in the lower center, which is an abbreviation of Enero 1 (January 1). Interestingly, he states that this artwork is the first work of the year.

This painting is one of many in the series of his empty gridded creations. He has continued this in 1935 and continued into the 1940s where he would refer to Incas stone works through a figurative connection of its social and cultural concepts. The grid would trigger conversations of the role abstraction has in his style. He plays with light and shadow to develop the effect of modeling. In this case, he creates a three dimensional view on a canvas. Because Torres-García painted on paper and then mounted it on a wooden canvas, he draws viewers attention to the surface and has them realize that he has created an interlinked stonewall.

== See also ==
- Cubism
- Galeries Dalmau
