= Zoma Baitler =

Lithuanian-born Uruguayan artist and diplomat

- Born: April 3, 1908; Šančiai, Lithuania
- Died: June 16, 1994 (aged 86); Montevideo, Uruguay
- Education: Art school and World ORT (Lithuania)
- Known for: Painting, Diplomacy
- Awards: Grand Prize Gold Medal (1952), Banco República Award (1940), Chamber of Senators Award (1939)

Zoma Baitler (3 April 1908 in Šančiai, Lithuania – 16 June 1994 in Montevideo, Uruguay) was a Jewish Lithuanian-born Uruguayan artist and diplomat.

== Biography ==
Zoma Baitler was the youngest of six children and his childhood was spent in his native village, a shtetl near Kaunas, Lithuania.

In addition to studying painting and drawing with the Lithuanian painter Paul Kaufman, Baitler attended the art school and World ORT in Lithuania. In 1927, he moved to Montevideo, Uruguay where he settled and began studying painting and the philosophy of art with the Uruguayan artist Joaquín Torres García. He was connected with other Lithuanian Jewish immigrants to Uruguay, and was involved in the Yiddish-language newspaper Folksblat as a linotypist.

Between 1949 and 1963, he made several study trips to Europe. In 1959, he was appointed member of the Uruguayan Commission of Fine Arts and between 1963 and 1964 he was cultural attaché of the diplomatic mission of Uruguay in Israel. He gave numerous lectures on Pedro Figari, Rafael Barradas, and Torres García.

His work is exhibited at the National Museum of Visual Arts (Uruguay) and the Juan Manuel Blanes Museum, the National Museum of Jerusalem, the Museum of Montevideo (Minnesota), his own house (Montevideo - Uruguay) and several art museums in New York in the United States.

== Awards ==
- Grand Prize Gold Medal. Montevideo (1952)
- Banco República Award. Municipal Hall of Fine Arts (1940)
- Chamber of Senators Award. National Hall of Fine Arts (1939)
