= Julio Alpuy =

Uruguayan painter, sculptor, and muralist

Julio Alpux
- Born: January 27, 1919; Tacuarembo, Uruguay
- Died: April 5, 2009 (aged 90); New York, New York, USA
- Movement: Constructive art

Julio Uruguay Alpuy (January 27, 1919 – April 5, 2009) was an Uruguayan painter, sculptor, and muralist. During his early career, Alpuy was a part of the Taller Torres-García (School of the South) and the constructive art movement. While his early works were greatly influenced by Torres-García's theories about what he called Constructive Universalism, Alpuy drew from a wide variety of cultures and myths to create works that broke the boundaries of the constructive grid. Additionally, his studies in Europe and Latin America helped develop an interest in Cubism and myths that influenced later works. Alpuy had a prolific career and his works are exhibited throughout the world.

== Biography ==
Alpuy was born in Tacuarembó, Uruguay, the capital of the Tacuarembó department in northern Uruguay, on January 27, 1919, to Sixto Alpuy and Virginia Bevans. When Alpuy was 18 months old his mother died, so he was raised by his paternal grandmother and aunts. Alpuy's childhood was spent in the countryside, where he learned various farming skills, but he also attended school. At the age of sixteen, Alpuy was sent to Montevideo to continue his education at the Liceo Dámaso Antonio Larrañaga.

While in Montevideo, Alpuy became friends with members the Libertarian Youth (Juventudes Libertarias). Alpuy attributes these years in association with the Juventudes Libertarias to have helped further his understandings of freedom, justice, and respect. During these early years, Alpuy had little to no interaction with art.

In 1939, Alpuy walked into an exhibition of José Cúneo's watercolors. Alpuy was amazed at the watercolors, so he bought various supplies and began drawing. Shortly after, Víctor Bachetta, a member of the Association of Constructive Art, connected Alpuy with Joaquín Torres-Garcia. Alpuy then joined the Taller Torres-García (TTG) in 1940. Alpuy's years at the TTG changed the trajectory of his life. He found a community that taught him how to create, but also challenged him intellectually.

After several years studying under Torres-Garcia, Alpuy began traveling around Latin America, Europe, and the Middle East. These travels provide new materials and ideas for Alpuy, as well as induced him to many new artist and thinkers. In between his travels abroad, Alpuy taught drawing at the TTG until 1955. His students include José Collell, Walter Deliotti, and Mario Lorieto.

By 1961, with over twenty years of experience he moved to New York City, NY and in 1965 married Maria Joana Gaspar Simões, daughter of Portuguese writer and literary critic João Gaspar Simões. Over the next forty-plus years, Alpuy lived and worked in New York. This remained his permanent residence until his death on April 5, 2009, at the age of 90.

== Career ==
=== The Taller Torres-García (TTG) ===
Alpuy's time at the TTG with Torres-Garcia and the other artists was invaluable. Torres-Garcia led a school where developing an ethical approach to artmaking was as important as the work itself. He taught his students how to create with various mediums including stone, wood, and clay, as well as the theory of Constructive Universalism. Torres-García hoped to construct a universally understandable form of art that transcended the bounds of time and culture. He composed his works through the use of a grid or as he called it "structure" whose proportions were set with the geometry of the Golden Mean, a recurrent number in the history of art that also appears in natural forms. He then chose archetypal symbols which he believed communicated universal messages and situated them inside the structure that organized the composition. The theory of Constructive Universalism began to shape Alpuy's work, and by the mid-forties he was painting in a style similar to the artists at the Taller.

While Alpuy and the other artists at the TTG focused on creating a form of art linked to the more general tradition of abstraction, they were also interested in the art of ancient cultures, especially those of South America. In December 1945, Torres-García encouraged Alpuy, and several others at the Taller, to travel in Latin America and study pre-Columbian art. Alpuy traveled primarily in Bolivia and Peru, and visited the "Gate of the Sun" in Tiwanaku. He additionally visited "Island of the Sun" and "Island of the Moon" at Lake Titicaca and Machu Picchu. Alpuy credits this experience in helping him understand Torres-García's ideas.

After Torres-García's death, in August 1949, Alpuy began teaching drawing at the Taller. He remained there until 1955. During these years Alpuy continued to develop his understanding of Constructive Universalism, but he began to divert from Torres-García's constructive style. Instead, Alpuy began delving into new mediums and ideas, and eventually left the school in 1956 to seek his own path.

=== International travels ===
While Alpuy's time at the TTG was transformational, his international travels further developed his own artistic identity. Even though Alpuy traveled abroad before his Bolivia and Peru trip of 1945, that journey began Alpuy's extensive traveling.

In December 1951, Alpuy left South America for Europe. He spent time in Greece where he studied classical and Byzantine architecture, sculpture, and mosaic. In the following January, Alpuy connected with Gonzalo Fonseca, a TTG artist, in Beirut, Lebanon. From Beirut, Alpuy and Fonseca toured Syria and Egypt, and paid special attention to Karnak while in Egypt. The Egyptian murals and hieroglyphs were very important for Alpuy because much of his interest in Constructive Universalism was focused on employing symbols and archetypes to project a message. The murals in Egypt encapsulated this for many TTG artists. After the Middle East, Alpuy returned to Europe and spent the majority of his time in Venice and Paris. While in Paris, Alpuy further studied Egyptian mythology. His notes highlight his interest in the Book of the Dead, which influenced some of Alpuy's later works. In 1953, Alpuy ended his European tour in Madrid, and then returned to Montevideo.

This period of travel provided new sources of inspiration for Alpuy. It helped him develop further interest in ancient cultures and the imagery these cultures used. Alpuy was not merely fascinated by images that were constructed, but how nature was the life-giving source to all. He became interested in the "magic" or myths found in many cultures. These new ideas, along with an evolving style caused him to break away from the TTG's teachings, and create his own style of art using the framework in which he had been trained.

=== New York ===
After Alpuy left the TTG, he received a grant from the New School for Social Research in New York City. Encouraged by the grant and the presence of Augusto Torres and Gonzalo Fonseca, fellow TTG artists, in New York, Alpuy decided to move permanently to the city. This new environment offered Alpuy a canvas for creating, and he took full advantage of it. In the winter of 1962, Alpuy began to experiment in forming wood plates. This medium enabled Alpuy to express his thoughts on myth, nature, and human consciousness in a new way. These plates received mixed reviews, and some critics mentioned the influences of Torres-Garcia in the work, while others noted Alpuy's distancing from his previous work at the TTG. By the late 1960s, Alpuy evolved his new wooden works to included statuary and wood panels.

Even though Alpuy occasionally traveled to Montevideo and other Latin American countries for exhibitions and commissions, Alpuy resided primarily in New York. In 1975, Alpuy began to teach drawing and painting classes in his studio. This interaction with the canvas reconnected him to his roots in painting, and he began to paint more often, primarily focusing on the individual in primeval landscapes and nature itself.

Alpuy continued to make and exhibit his art into his eighties. However, during his years in New York City he adamantly argued that he was not influenced by his environment. He states that he was a fully developed artist by the time he moved to New York. Additionally, Alpuy occasionally worked as a carpenter, so that the integrity of his work would not be influenced by money. Alpuy's works are still exhibited today, and he has gained recognition as one of the great Uruguayan artists.

== Exhibitions ==
=== One-man shows ===
1948 - Vian Gallery, Buenos Aires, Argentina

1956 - Sociedad Amigos del Arte, Montevideo Uruguay

1958 - Biblioteca Luis Ángel Arango, Bogota, Colombia

1959 - Fundaciones Mendoza, Caracas, Venezuela

1959 - Universidad de Carabobo, Valencia, Venezuela

1960 - Biblioteca Luis Ángel Arango, Bogota, Colombia

1964 - J. Walter Thompson Company, New York

1964 - University of Massachusetts, Amherst, Massachusetts

1964 - Galería El País, Montevideo, Uruguay

1969 - Zegri Gallery, New York, New York, New York

1971 - Galería Losada, Montevideo, Uruguay

1972 - Center for Inter-American Relations, New York

1972 - Galería do Diario de Noticias, Lisboa, Portugal

1976 - Galería Losada, Montevideo, Uruguay

1977 - La Galería, Bogotá, Colombia

1978 - La Trinchera, Caracas, Venezuela

1979 - Alianza Cultural Uruguay y EE.UU., Montevideo, Uruguay

1980 - Karlen Gugelmeier, Montevideo, Uruguay

1980 - Galería Sarmiento, Buenos Aires, Argentina

1983 - Museo Rayo, Roldanillo-Valle, Colombia

1985 - Museum of Contemporary Hispanic Art, New York

1988 - Galería Dialogo, Brussels

1989 - Galería Palatina, Buenos Aires, Argentina

1990 - Walter F. Maibaum Fine Arts, New York

1997 - Works on Paper, Cecilia de Torres, Ltd., New York

1999 - Centro Cultural Recoleta, Buenos Aires, Argentina

2003 - Cecilia de Torres. Ltd., New York

=== Group shows ===
1942/1960 - All Collective shows of Taller Torres-Garcia in South America, Europe, and United States

1952/1954 - Bienal de São Paulo, São Paulo, Brazil

1957 - Museum of Modern Art, Amsterdam, Holland

1964 - Washington Gallery, New York

1964 - Bonino Gallery, New York

1964 - Jockey Club, Montevideo, Uruguay

1965 - The Emily Lowe Gallery, Hofstra University, New York

1966 - Cisneros Gallery, New York

1967 - Center for Inter-American Relations, New York

1969 - Zegri Gallery, New York

1970 - Marymount College, Tarry1own, New York

1970 - The Staff Assoc. of The Inter-American Development Bank, Washington, D.C.

1970 - Zegri Gallery, New York

1970 - Exposicion Panamericana de Artes Graficas, Cali, Colombia

1970 - II Bienal de Arte Coltejer, Medellín, Colombia

1970 - Center for Inter-American Relations, New York

1971 - Greenwich Library, Greenwich, Connecticut

1971 - Museum of Stamford, Stamford, Connecticut

1971 - Primera Bienal Americana de Artes Gráficas, Cali, Colombia

1972 - Columbia University, New York

1972 - III Bienal de Arte Coltejer, Medellín, Colombia

1973 - Queens County Art and Cultural Center, Queens, N.Y.

1973 - University of Massachusetts, Amherst, Massachusetts

1974 - III Bienal del Grabado Latinoamericano, San Juan, Puerto Rico

1976 - III Bienal Americana de Artes Gráficas, Cali, Colombia

1976 - The New York Botanical Garden Museum, New York

1977 - The Alternative Center for International Arts, New York

1977 - Arte Actual de Iberoamérica, Instituto de Cultura Hispánica, Madrid, Spain

1978 - Latin American Art Show, Great Neck Library, Great Neck, N.Y.

1978 - Arte Ibero Americano, Museo de Bellas Artes, Caracas, Venezuela

1979 - Window to the South, Henry Street Settlement, New York

1983 - 17 Bienal de São Paulo, Sáo Paulo, Brazil

1983 - Museo de Arte Moderno y Arquitectura, Buenos Aires, Argentina

2002 - Sicardi Gallery, Houston, Texas

== Bibliography ==
Barnitz, Jaqueline. Latin American Artists in New York Since 1970. Austin: A. M. Huntington Art Gallery, College of Fine Arts, University of Texas at Austin, 1987.

Cancel, Luis R.; Quirarte, Jacinto; Benítez, Marimar; Perazzo, Nelly; Sims, Lowery S.; Cockcroft, Eva; Angel, Félix and Stellweg, Carla. The Latin American Spirit: Art and Artists in the United States, 1920-1970. New York: Bronx Museum of Art in association with Harry N. Abrams, 1988.

Christ, Ronald. Julio Alpuy: April 4 to May 4. New York: Museum of Contemporary Hispanic Art, 1984.

El Taller Torres-García: The school of the South and Its Legacy, Edited by Mari Carmen Ramirez. Austin: University of Austin Press, 1992.

Haber, Alicia. Latin American Art in the Twentieth Century, edited by Edward J. Sullivan. London: Phaidon Press Inc., 2004.

Kraskin, Sandra, and Balderrama, Maria R. Journeys of Julio Alpuy. New York: Baruch College, 1997.

Ramírez, Mari Carmen, et al. Inverted Utopias: Avant-Garde Art in Latin America. New Haven: Yale University Press, 2004.
