= Augusto Torres =

Uruguayan painter and muralist (1913-1992)

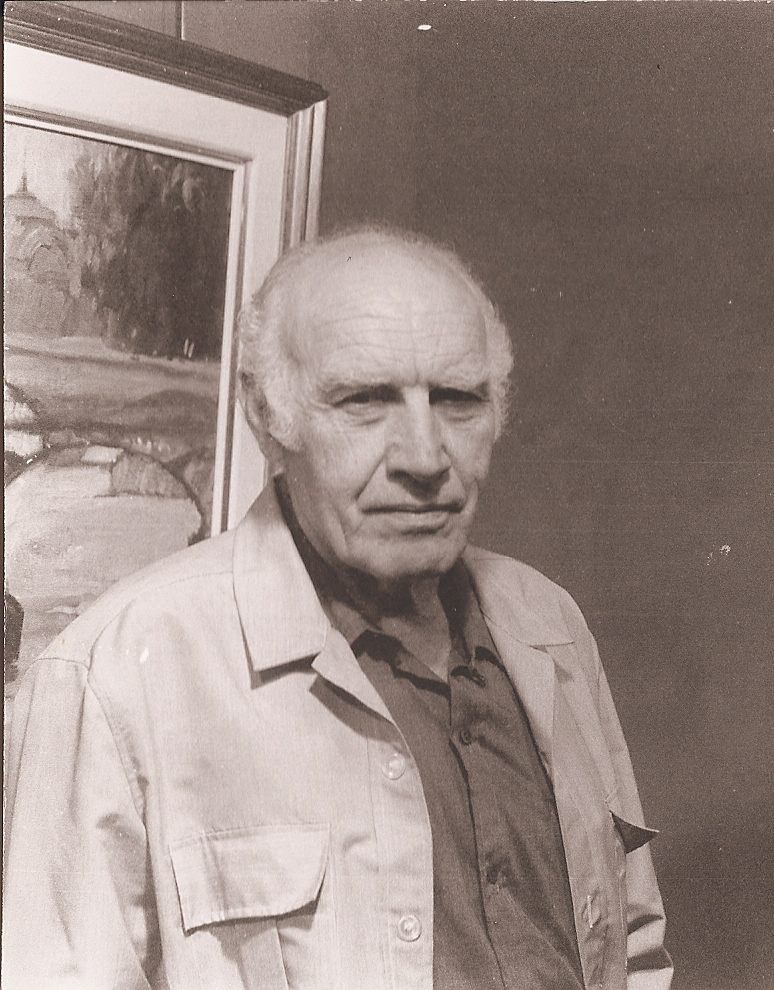
- Born: 19 June 1913; Terrassa, Barcelona
- Died: 13 March 1992 (aged 60); Barcelona
- Known for: Painting, Mural
- Movement: Constructivism
- Relatives: Joaquín Torres García (father), Manolita Piña (mother)

Augusto Torres (Terrassa, Barcelona, 19 June 1913 – Barcelona, 13 March 1992) was a Uruguayan painter and muralist of Spanish origin. He was the second son of the painter Joaquín Torres García and Manolita Piña.

== Biography ==
His childhood was spent in various cities. In 1919, the family moved to New York, where they lived until 1922. They then returned to Europe and settled in Fiesole, Italy, where they stayed until 1926. During these years, Augusto became familiar with the frescoes of Tuscany and the city of Florence.

Later, the family relocated to France, settling in Paris in the home of Jean Hélion. This environment sparked Augusto's interest in African sculpture and anthropology. In 1928, at just 15 years old, he was hired by the Musée de Trocadéro (now the Museum of Mankind) to illustrate and catalog its collection of Inca and Nazca vessels, igniting his fascination with pre-Columbian culture. He also began studying art history, customs, and the metaphysics of Indigenous American peoples. In 1930, he worked in the studio of Julio González, assisting in the creation of a replica of Picasso's Hommage à Apollinaire. Picasso often visited the workshop, exposing Augusto to an influential artistic environment.

In 1934, the family relocated to Montevideo, Uruguay, where Joaquín Torres García founded the Taller Torres-García. Augusto became one of its most prominent members, contributing significantly to the dissemination of Constructivist principles in Latin America.

In the Taller Torres García, Augusto developed his craft under his father's guidance, focusing on the Constructive Universalism philosophy, which emphasized geometric forms and universal symbols. Over time, Augusto's style evolved, incorporating more expressive and introspective elements.

== Artistic career ==
=== Influences and style ===
Augusto Torres's early work was deeply influenced by the teachings of his father and the collective efforts of the Taller Torres-García. He specialized in creating balanced compositions using geometric abstraction. Over time, he moved beyond strict Constructivism, exploring themes of identity, nature, and cultural heritage.

=== Notable exhibitions ===
- Sala Dalmau in Barcelona frequently exhibited Augusto's work, providing an essential platform for his artistic recognition in Europe.
- Retrospectives at institutions such as the Museo Nacional de Artes Visuales (MNAV) in Montevideo have honored his legacy, showcasing a wide array of his works.

=== Mural work ===
- 1943: Mural in the house of architect Freddy Guttman in Buenos Aires.
- 1944: Participates alongside Torres-García and members of his Taller in the creation of murals for the Saint-Bois Hospital, Montevideo.
- 1954: 2 x 6 m mural for the Medical Union of Montevideo.
- 1958: Relief mural for Liceo Héctor Miranda, Montevideo.
- 1964: Collaborates with architect Antoni Bonet on a large limestone mural for the Río de la Plata Bank in Montevideo.
- 1968: 2 x 6 m ceramic mural in the house of architect Ernesto Leborgne.
- 1976: 27-square-meter polychrome wooden mural carved in collaboration with architect Antoni Bonet in Barcelona.
- 1978: 4 x 1.60 m mural for Discount Bank Overseas Ltd. in Montevideo.
- 1979: Two murals, one in wood (2.75 x 14.74 m) and another in ceramic (2.72 x 16.5 m), created in collaboration with architect Antoni Bonet.

=== Later recognition ===
In his later years, Augusto continued to produce art that bridged modernist principles with his own experimental forms. His work was celebrated for its blend of universal geometric language and personal expression, earning him recognition as one of Uruguay's foremost modernist artists.

== Legacy ==
Augusto Torres's contributions to modern art in Uruguay and abroad have cemented his place as a key figure in 20th-century Latin American art. His works remain part of significant public and private collections, continuing to inspire new generations of artists. Galleries such as Artsper and Sala Dalmau continue to feature his art.

== See also ==
- Augusto Torres. Exposició retrospectiva (en catalán). Terrassa: Centre cultural Caixa Terrassa. (1998)
- Elizabeth Fonseca, ed. Augusto Torres. Scala Books. (1986)
- Augusto Torres. La consecuencia extrema. Muestra antológica 1936-1991. (Museo Torres García – Cabildo de Montevideo edición). Montevideo: Ediciones de la Plaza. (1994)
