= José Gurvich =

Uruguayan painter

- Zusmanas Gurvicius
- Born: Zusmanas Gurvicius; January 5, 1927; Jieznas, Lithuania
- Died: June 24, 1974 (aged 47); New York City, United States
- Citizenship: Uruguay
- Education: National School of Fine Arts, Montevideo
- Known for: Painting, Pottery, Music
- Notable work: Mural at Ramot Menashe kibbutz, Israel
- Style: Constructivism
- Movement: Constructivism
- Parents: Jacob Gurvich (father); Jaie Galperas (mother)
- Relatives: Myriam Gurvich (sister)
- Memorials: Museo Gurvich, Montevideo

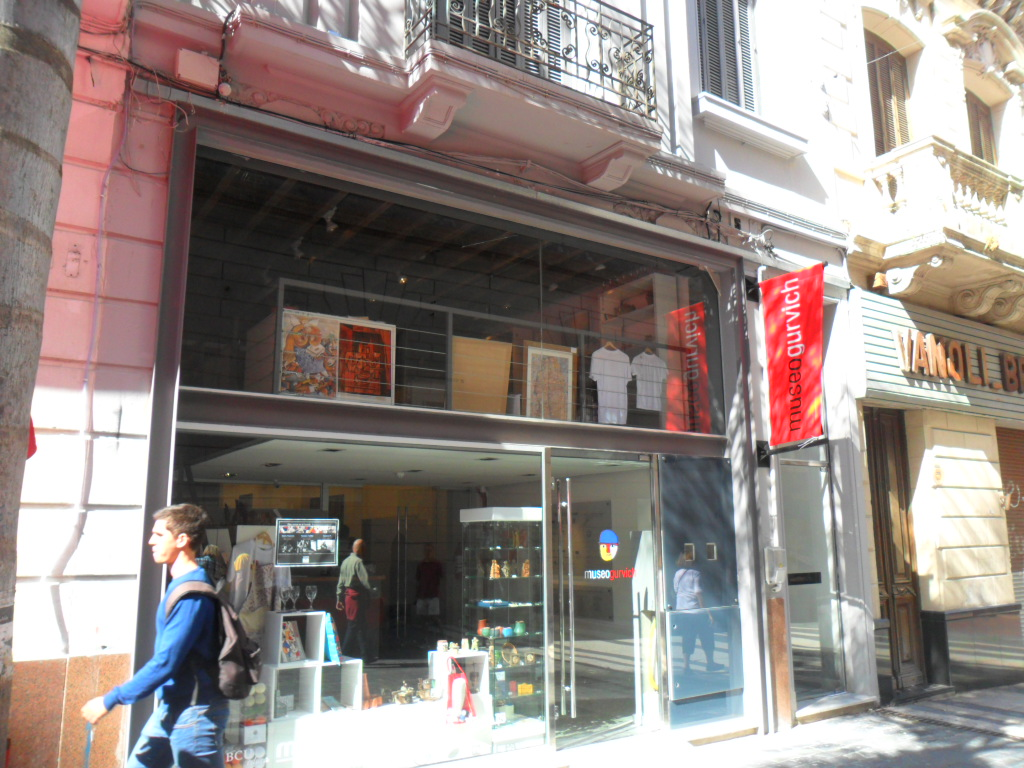
Façade of Museo Gurvich

José Gurvich (January 5, 1927 – June 24, 1974) was a Uruguayan painter, potter, musician and a key figure in the Constructivism Art movement.

== Life and career ==
Zusmanas Gurvičius was born on January 5, 1927, in Jieznas, Lithuania, to Jacob Gurvich and Jaie Galperas, both were of Lithuanian-Jewish origins. In 1931 his father Jacob, seeking freedom from religious persecution and a better future for his family. He and his family emigrated to Montevideo, Uruguay. In 1932 Jacob sent for his wife and two children. Once they arrived they moved into Barrio Sur, a neighborhood consisting mainly of European immigrants. His father began working as a barber, and later opened many barbershops of his own throughout the city.

He was enrolled in elementary school under the name of José Gurvich, as school officials could not understand why his father's surname was Gurvich and his Gurvicius. From the beginning he displayed a love for the arts, constantly drawing for his sister and her friends. Upon finishing elementary school he started working in a factory. In 1942 he began studying painting at the National School of Fine Arts in Montevideo under the tutoring of José Cúneo. The following year he took up music and violin with professor Julber. He met Horacio Torres, who was also studying violin, and it was then that his life took a decisive turn.

In 1944, Julber got him an interview with the famous painter, Joaquín Torres García. From then on his true calling was defined. His world of shapes and colors was complete. He joined the controversial studio created by Torres García, where he worked until the Studio closed. Whilst there he taught Torres' grand-daughter, Eva Díaz Torres. In subsequent years, his work was exhibited throughout Uruguay and published in "Removedor", one of the most important publications promoting art in Latin America.

After the death of Torres García, he travelled extensively through Europe and Israel. While in Israel he stayed at the Ramot Menashe kibbutz, where his sister Myriam and his parents lived. In the kibbutz he worked as a shepherd and was asked to paint a mural for the public dining room. It was there that he came to grips with his Jewish ancestry and took part in what was the birth of the Jewish State. Living at the kibbutz he painted the world and the reality which surrounded him; Israeli pastoral and religious traditions and Yiddish folklore. In 1956 he held the first of three exhibitions at the Katz Gallery in Tel Aviv. In Spain he continued his work inspired by the Spanish masters, Goya and Velázquez; but it was the work of El Bosco and Pieter Brueghel that fuelled his thirst for diversity and learned to transform his wealth of images into his own unique vision.

He moved to New York City in 1970 with his wife and son. He lived the remaining of his life in New York since it had a diverse environments that had shaped him from his native Montevideo to his Jewish roots in the vibrant sounds of New York, it helped him define his unique artistic talent which seemed to effortlessly bridge cultures and distances. He died in New York unexpectedly at age of 47 and at the height of his career. Museo Gurvich in Montevideo, Uruguay has an extensive collection of his art.
