= List of Uruguayan artists =

This is an incomplete list of Uruguayan artists.

== A ==
- Rosa Acle (1919–1990), painter
- Orestes Acquarone (1875–1952), cartoonist and lithographer
- Gladys Afamado (1925–2024), visual artist, engraver, poet
- Guiscardo Améndola (1906–1972), painter
- Carmelo Arden Quin (1913–2010), painter, one of the founders of the Madí movement
- Rodolfo Arotxarena (born 1958), caricaturist
- Carmelo de Arzadun (1888–1968), painter
- Pablo Atchugarry (born 1954), sculptor

== B ==
- Zoma Baitler (1908–1994), painter
- Rafael Barradas (1890–1929), painter
- Eduardo Barreto (1954–2011), comic strip cartoonist
- José Belloni (1882–1965), sculptor
- Juan Manuel Blanes (1830–1901), painter

== C ==
- Raúl Javiel Cabrera (1919–1992), painter
- Juan José Calandria (1902–1980), painter and sculptor
- Luis Camnitzer (born 1937), conceptual artist
- Carlos Capelán (born 1948) painter
- Rimer Cardillo (born 1944) engraver
- Humberto Causa (1890–1925) painter
- José Cuneo Perinetti (1887–1977), painter

== D ==
- Eladio Dieste (1917–2000), architect specialized in brickwork
- Diego de los Campos (born 1971), multimedia artist

== F ==
- Pedro Figari (1861–1938), painter
- Antonio Frasconi (1919–2013), printmaker
- Román Fresnedo Siri (1903–1975), architect

== G ==
- Haroldo González (born 1941)
- Leonilda González (1923–2017) painter
- Alejandra González Soca (born 1973)
- José Gurvich (1927–1974), painter

== H ==
- Diógenes Hequet (1866–1902), painter
- Anhelo Hernández Ríos (1922–2010)
- Carlos María Herrera (1875–1914), painter

== I ==
- Eloísa Ibarra (born 1968), plastic artist and painter

== J ==
- Edward Johnston (1872–1944), calligrapher and designer
- Diego Jourdan (born 1977), author, illustrator, printmaker

== L ==
- Clever Lara (born 1952), plastic artist, painter
- José Liard (born 1945), muralist
- Hilda López (1922–1996), painter, sculptor

== N ==
- Amalia Nieto (1907–2003), painter, sculptor, and engraver

== O ==
- Dumas Oroño (1921–2005)
- Raquel Orzuj (1939–2018)

== P ==
- Agó Páez Vilaró (born 1954)
- Carlos Páez Vilaró (1923–2014), painter
- Josefa Palacios (?–1881), painter
- Ricardo Pascale (1942–2024), sculptor
- Virginia Patrone (born 1950), painter
- Manolita Piña (1883–1994), painter
- Amalia Polleri (1909–1996), teacher, artist, poet, journalist, and art critic
- Daniel Pontet (born 1957)
- María Carmen Portela (1898–1983)

== R ==
- Nelson Ramos (1932–2006)
- Nelbia Romero (1938–2015)

== S ==
- Hermenegildo Sábat (1933–2018), caricaturist
- Carlos Federico Sáez (1878–1901), painter
- Martin Sastre (born 1976), media artist
- Felipe Seade (1912–1969), painter
- Alejandro Stock Silberman (born 1965), painter

== T ==
- Joaquín Torres García (1874–1949), painter

== V ==
- Eduardo Vernazza (1910–1991), painter
- Petrona Viera (1895–1960), painter
- Cecilia Vignolo (born 1971), sculptor, visual artist
- Julio Vilamajó (1894–1948), architect
- Juan Fernando Vieytes Pérez (1916–1962), painter

== W ==
- Margaret Whyte (born 1940)

== Z ==
- Guma Zorrilla (1919–2001), costume designer
- José Luis Zorrilla de San Martín (1891–1975), sculptor

== See also ==
- List of Latin American artists
- List of Uruguayans
