= Carlos Prevosti =

- Born: Carlos Prevosti; 5 October 1896; Montevideo, Uruguay
- Died: 11 May 1955 (aged 58); Montevideo, Uruguay
- Education: Círculo de Bellas Artes del Uruguay
- Known for: Painting, engraving, arts education

Carlos Prevosti (5 October 1896 – 11 May 1955) was a Uruguayan visual artist and educator. Born in Montevideo, he was associated with painting, printmaking, and arts education in Uruguay during the first half of the twentieth century.

== Early life and education ==
Prevosti was born into a family of Italian origin. In 1915, he began his artistic training with Godofredo Sommavilla at the Italian School. He also studied painting with Luis Pedro Cantú at the School of Sculpture and Decorative Arts. That same year, he entered the Círculo de Bellas Artes del Uruguay, where he studied under Vicente Puig and Guillermo Laborde.

== European studies ==
In 1926, Prevosti travelled to Europe for further study. He initially stayed in Germany and Belgium, where he examined educational methods and curricula for art instruction in primary schools. He later travelled through the Netherlands, Switzerland, Italy, and France, settling in Paris until 1932.

While in Paris, he attended the workshops of artists including Fernand Léger, André Lhote, Henri Le Fauconnier, and Roger Bissière. In 1931, he returned temporarily to Italy to study the curriculum and organisation of the Brera Academy of Fine Arts. He also studied metal engraving and enamelling at the School of Arts and Crafts in Paris, in addition to stage lighting, costume design, and scenic production for theatre and film.

== Career in Uruguay ==
After returning to Uruguay in 1932, Prevosti devoted himself primarily to teaching visual arts in primary schools, secondary schools, and educational institutes. He also participated in the Escuela Experimental de Las Piedras, an experimental educational initiative promoted by Sabas Olaizola. Within the project, he worked in the teaching of drawing, engraving, painting, modelling, pottery, puppet theatre, and toy-making, among other artistic and craft techniques.

During his lifetime, Prevosti exhibited at the Salón de Artistas Gráficos Argentinos, the Salón de Artistas Uruguayos in Rosario, and exhibitions in San Juan, Argentina. At the exhibition commemorating the centenary of the Independence of Uruguay in 1930, he received a silver medal for engraving and a special prize for painting. Between 1940 and 1942, he received acquisition prizes at the first three Municipal Salons of Plastic Arts organised by the Municipality of Montevideo.

One of his best-known paintings is ''La cola'' (1942).

== Death and legacy ==
Prevosti died in Montevideo on 11 May 1955.

In 1957, the National Commission of Fine Arts organised a retrospective exhibition in his honour featuring around 200 works. In subsequent decades, his work was exhibited in various museums and galleries, although individual exhibitions of his work became infrequent after the 1970s, with the exception of an exhibition held in Montevideo in 2009.

Since 2016, the majority of Prevosti's works have been held by the Museo Nacional de Artes Visuales. His works are also represented in the Museo Juan Manuel Blanes and in private collections.

His works entered the public domain in Uruguay on 1 January 2026.
