= Alfredo De Simone =

- Born: April 28, 1893; Montevideo, Uruguay
- Died: June 4, 1950 (aged 57); Montevideo, Uruguay
- Education: Círculo de Bellas Artes
- Known for: Painting, drawing, illustration
- Style: Figurative art
- Movement: Modern art in Uruguay

Alfredo De Simone (April 28, 1893 – June 4, 1950) was an Italian-born Uruguayan painter known for his expressive depictions of urban landscapes and interiors, particularly scenes from Montevideo's working-class neighborhoods. He was noted for his heavily textured painting technique and contribution to modern Uruguayan art.

== Early life and education ==
Alfredo De Simone was born in Lattarico, Cosenza, Italy, in either 1892 or 1898 (sources differ on the exact year). He emigrated with his family to Montevideo, Uruguay, in 1901. At a young age, De Simone suffered an accident that left him semi-paralyzed on his left side, a condition that affected his mobility and contributed to the introspective nature of his work.

In 1916, he received a scholarship to study at the Círculo de Bellas Artes under Guillermo Laborde. He also studied with Pedro Blanes Viale, Carmelo de Arzadun, and Vicente Puig.

== Career ==
De Simone began painting in the early 1920s, participating in group exhibitions in Montevideo and Buenos Aires. In 1927, he was hired as a technical assistant at the Museo Nacional de Bellas Artes (now the Museo Nacional de Artes Visuales), becoming a full staff member in 1933. He also worked as a set designer and collaborated with theater companies in Montevideo. In 1935, he co-founded the Unión de Artistas Plásticos del Uruguay.

His work was included in the Exposición Iberoamericana de Sevilla in 1930, where he received a silver medal. He held multiple solo exhibitions, including an important retrospective at the Subte Municipal de Montevideo in 1943.

== Artistic style ==
De Simone developed a unique technique characterized by dense textures and expressive use of material. He often used palette knives, spatulas, and even his fingers to apply thick layers of paint, producing what critics described as “colored bas-reliefs.” His works focused on scenes of Barrio Sur and Palermo, two historical neighborhoods of Montevideo, typically devoid of human figures and rendered with a subdued, atmospheric palette. He also painted portraits and still lifes.

== Legacy ==
De Simone’s paintings are preserved in major Uruguayan art collections, including the Museo Nacional de Artes Visuales and the Museo Juan Manuel Blanes. His work has been recognized posthumously for its contribution to the development of a modern and locally rooted visual language in Uruguay. De Simone died in Montevideo on 27 January 1950.

== Selected works ==
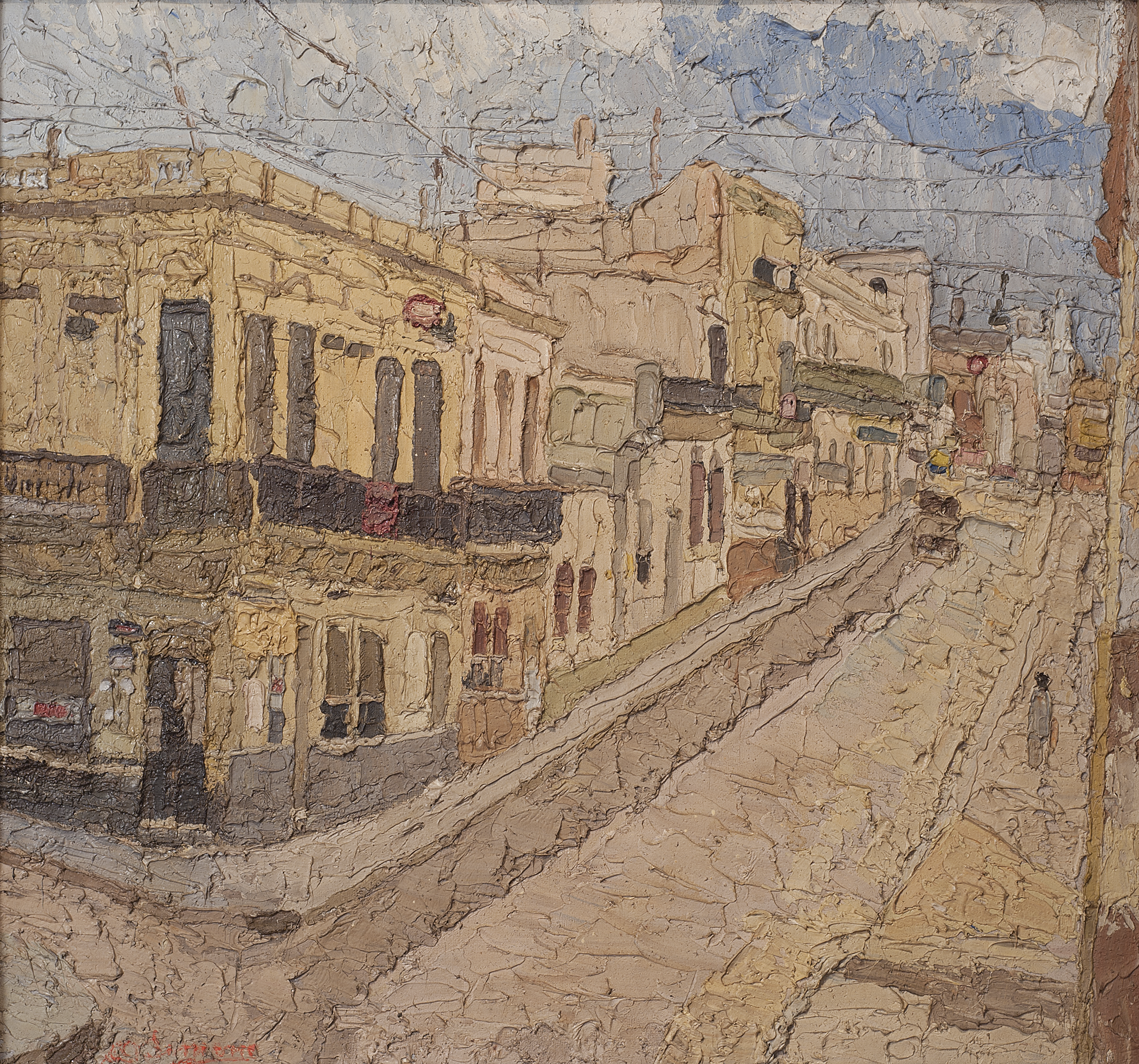
Alfredo De Simone - La calle

- La calle (c. 1942) – Museo Nacional de Artes Visuales
- Puerto – Museo Nacional de Artes Visuales
- Las negras – Museo Juan Manuel Blanes
- Retrato de la madre – Museo Juan Manuel Blanes
