= Petrona Viera =

Uruguayan artist (1895-1960)

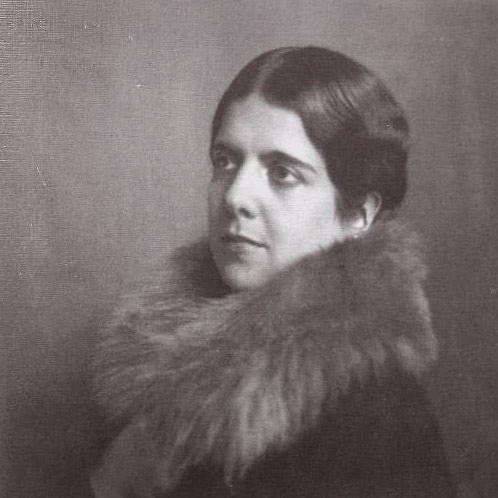
- Born: María Petrona Viera Garino; 24 May 1895; Montevideo, Uruguay
- Died: 4 October 1960 (aged 65); Montevideo, Uruguay
- Movement: Planismo

María Petrona Viera Garino (24 March 1895 – 4 October 1960), commonly known as Petrona Viera, was an Uruguayan painter known for being the first female professional painter in Uruguay and for her participation in the Planismo movement.

== Life and career ==
Petrona Viera was born in Montevideo to Carmen Garino and Uruguayan President Feliciano Viera. At the age of two, Viera contracted meningitis, which left her deaf. Her parents considered that her education was important, so they hired a French teacher that specialized in deaf education, Madeleine Larnaudie, who taught her lip reading and sign language.

Around the age of 20, Viera began to take private painting lessons with the Catalan artist Vicente Puig, but she stopped working with him when he left the country a few years later. In 1922, she began to take lessons from Guillermo Laborde, who influenced her to join the Planismo movement. She began to exhibit her paintings in 1923 in Montevideo, and had her first solo exhibition in 1926 at Galería Maveroff. She participated in various collaborative exhibitions in Buenos Aires, París, Chile and Bolivia amongst others. Guillermo Laborde's death in 1940 affected her deeply and led her to change the direction of her work. After his death, she worked with Guillermo Rodríguez and began producing engravings, watercolors, and ceramics. She continued to paint, but her themes changed, and she began to paint more landscapes and nature scenes than her previous scenes of children's life.

== Style ==
Petrona Viera is associated with Planismo, an Uruguayan artistic movement from the '20s and the '30s. This style is characterized by its bidimensionality with a plain treatment of the colors, a shiny palette with more mixed colors than primary, and a turned perspective, which causes the motifs to look like they are in the same level. Famous artists of this movement are José Cuneo Perinetti, Carmelo de Arzadun and Alfredo De Simone, amongst others. Petrona Viera's work is different from the typical Planismo, choosing to make her motifs more about daily life, for example: of her home, of children playing and studying, of the servants, of her sisters' work sewing. As time went on, she changed her motifs more to landscapes, which is a really typical motif in Planismo painters.

== Tributes ==
- In 2019 a mural is inaugurated in her honor as part of an artistic corridor in the Legislative Palace. It was made by José Gallino.
