= Vicente Puig =

Spanish-born Uruguayan artist (1882–1965)

- Born: Vicenç Puig; 10 October 1882; Mataró, Spain
- Died: 25 June 1965 (aged 82); Buenos Aires, Argentina
- Education: Academy of Fine Arts, 1905
- Occupation: Educator
- Known for: Painting

Vicente Puig (Catalan: Vicenç Puig; 10 October 1882 – 25 June 1965) was a Spanish-born Uruguayan painter and educator active in Montevideo and Buenos Aires.

== Early life and education ==
Puig was born Vicenç Puig on 10 October 1882 in Mataró, during the Bourbon Restoration. Puig's family later emigrated to Uruguay. On 27 October 1905 (Note: Also cited as 1906.), Puig enrolled at the Munich Academy of Fine Arts where he studied under Johann Caspar Herterich and Franz von Stuck. Puig later studied in Paris under Fernand Cormon. Puig briefly worked in Madrid and Rome before returning to Uruguay.

== Career ==
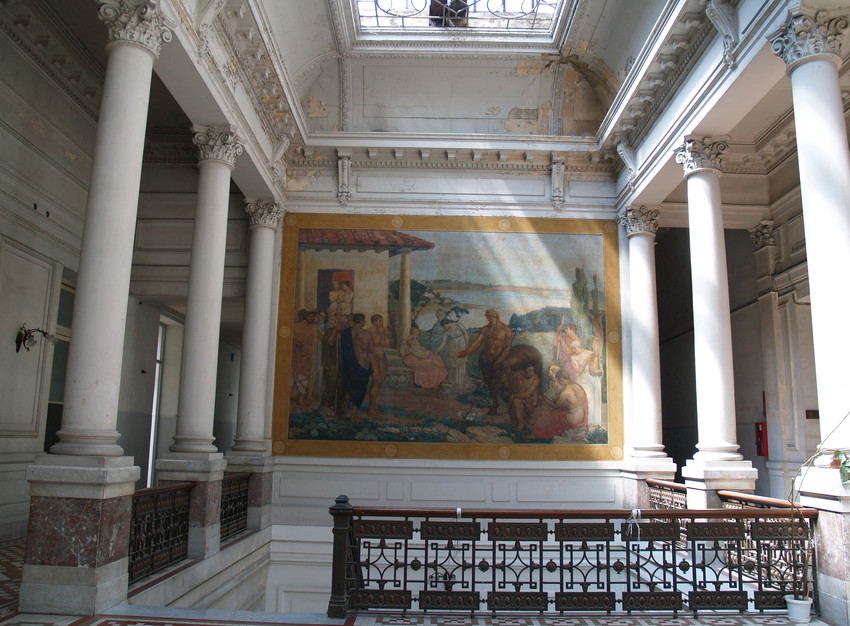
Vicente Puig and Antonio Pena (1919) Quirón el Centauro dicta el primer Tratado de Terapéutica.

Puig primarily painted portraiture and the human figure, with many of his works depicting women. Puig taught alongside Carlos María Herrera at the Circle of Fine Arts (Círculo de Bellas Artes) in Montevideo. Puig's students included Ricardo L. Aguerre, Humberto Causa, José Pedro Costigliolo, Alfredo De Simone, Alberto Dura, Humberto Frangella, Antonio Pena, César Augusto Pesce Castro, Carlos Prevosti, Dolcey Schenone Puig, Petrona Viera and José Luis Zorrilla de San Martín.

In October 1918, Puig and his student Antonio Pena entered into a competition to paint a historical panel at the Facultad de Medicina, University of the Republic. Awarded first prize, the resulting 1919 piece Quirón el Centauro dicta el primer Tratado de Terapéutica is located in the upper floor of the Facultad de Medicina. Later moving to Buenos Aires, Puig worked at the University of Buenos Aires where he taught Miguel Ocampo. Puig is also known to have privately taught Fernando Montes and Sarah Grilo.

== Personal life ==
On 25 June 1965 Puig died in Buenos Aires, aged 82.
