= Costigliolo =

Costigliolo is an Italian surname. Notable people with the surname include:

- Carlo Costigliolo (1893–1968), Italian gymnast, brother of Luigi
- José Pedro Costigliolo (1902–1985), Uruguayan painter and visual artist
- Luigi Costigliolo (1892–1939), Italian gymnast, brother of Carlo

== See also ==
- Costigliole (disambiguation)
