= CAUSA =

CAUSA or Causa may refer to:

- Compañía Aeronáutica Uruguaya S.A., a historic airline company in Uruguay
- CAUSA International, an anti-communist organization in New York
- Causa, a genus of air-breathing land snails
- Causa limeña, a dish in Peruvian cuisine made with potatoes and layered or topped with meat or vegetables
- Humberto Causa (1890–1925), Uruguayan painter
