= Humberto Causa =

Uruguayan painter (1890–1925)

- Born: August 8, 1890; Montevideo, Uruguay
- Died: January 1925; La Plata, Argentina
- Education: Círculo de Bellas Artes (Montevideo)
- Known for: Painting, Ceramics
- Notable work: Landscapes from Mallorca and Maldonado
- Movement: Planismo
- Awards: Government scholarship for study in Europe (1913)

Humberto Causa (August 8, 1890 – January 1925) was a Uruguayan painter and ceramicist associated with Planismo, a distinctive movement in early 20th-century Uruguayan art that emphasized flat forms and bold color.

== Early life and education ==
Causa was born on August 8, 1890, in Montevideo, Uruguay, to parents Ana Carbone and Domingo Causa. He began his artistic training in La Plata, Argentina, before returning to Uruguay to study at the Círculo de Bellas Artes in Montevideo. There, he was mentored by Carlos María Herrera and Vicente Puig.

In 1913, he was awarded a scholarship by the Uruguayan government, which enabled him to pursue further studies in Europe. During this time, he lived and worked in Mallorca, Spain, where he produced several of his most celebrated pieces. He returned to Uruguay in 1917 and entered a particularly productive period marked by vibrant use of color and expressive compositions that earned him recognition among the most innovative painters of his generation.

== Career ==
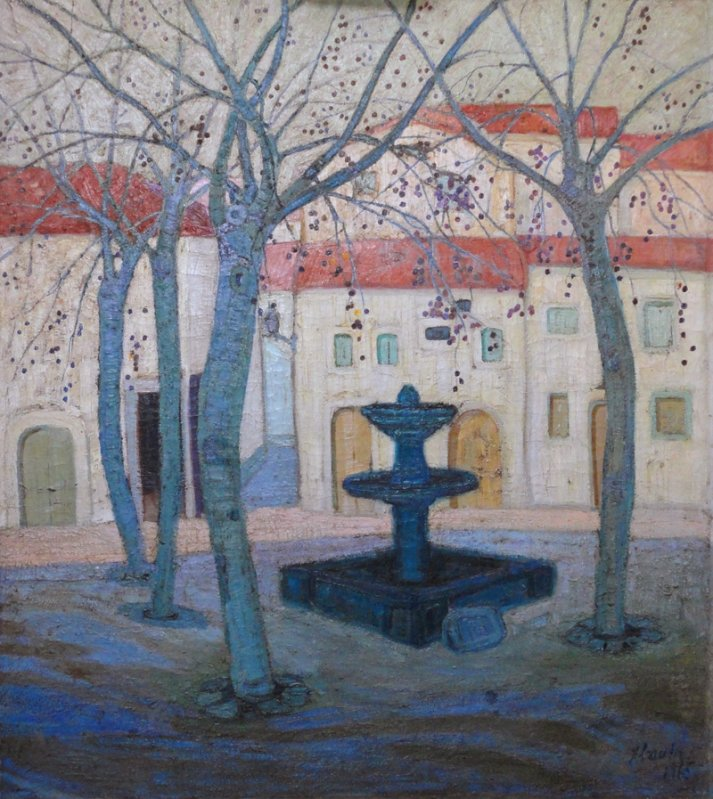
Humberto Causa - Pollenza Square

In 1918, Causa spent six months living and working with fellow artist José Cúneo in Maldonado. This residency inspired a series of landscape paintings that captured the unique atmosphere of the region. During this time, he was also active as an art teacher.

Causa’s work reflects the defining traits of Planismo, with flattened spatial perspectives and vivid chromatic schemes. Though his career was cut short, he made a significant impact on modern Uruguayan visual culture. His paintings are held in the collections of the Museo Nacional de Artes Visuales and the Museo Juan Manuel Blanes, as well as in private collections.

Humberto Causa died in La Plata, Argentina, in January 1925, at the age of 34. Despite his brief career, he is remembered as a foundational figure in early modern Uruguayan painting.
