= María Freire =

Uruguayan painter (1917–2015)

- Born: 7 November 1917; Montevideo, Uruguay
- Died: 19 June 2015 (aged 97); Montevideo, Uruguay
- Occupations: Painter; Sculptor; Art critic
- Years active: 1952-2015
- Awards: Premio Figari

María Freire (7 November 1917 – 19 June 2015) was a Uruguayan painter, sculptor, and art critic. She was one of the leading figures in the development of concrete art and non-figurative art in Uruguay. She was a co-founder the Grupo de Arte No Figurativo.

== Early life ==
Freire was born in Montevideo, Uruguay.

== Career ==
From 1938 to 1943, Freire studied painting and sculpture at the Círculo de Bellas Artes, Universidad del Trabajo del Uruguay in Montevideo under José Cuneo Perinetti, Guillermo Laborde, and Severino Pose, and then at the Consejo de Educación Técnico Profesional under Antonio Pose.

She began to explore modern artistic languages by studying African masks and precolumbian art. In 1946, she began exploring abstraction, using flat forms and also making mobile sculptures in unconventional materials. When she met José Pedro Costigliolo in 1952, they were both exploring similar artistic styles. The couple married, shared studio space and traveled together. They were cofounders of the Grupo de Arte No Figurativo.

In 1953, she visited the 2nd São Paulo Art Biennial, where she came into contact with other contemporary artists of the time. She learned of the work of European painters Piet Mondrian, Theo van Doesburg, and Friedrich Vordemberge-Gildewart among others, which led to the consolidation of her abstract language.

In 1957, Freire and Costigliolo were awarded the "Gallinal" prize which allowed them to travel to Europe where they studied at the Stedelijk Museum and at the Louvre Museum with Bernard Dorival and André Varagnac. In 1966 she returned to Europe to continue her studies.

From 1962 to 1973, Freire was the art critic for the newspaper "Acción" and taught drawing and cultural history at the Architecture School in Colonia del Sacramento, where she met the artists Rhod Rothfuss and Gyula Kosice, key artists of the Madí Movement.

Freire was also in touch with the group of abstract artists around Aldo Pellegrini in Argentina and felt great affinity with concrete and neoconcrete artists in Brazil, like Amílcar de Castro, Lygia Pape, Lygia Clark and Hélio Oiticica, but her work developed its own characteristic style. Freire tended to work in series, taking colors, rhythms and forms as their own subjects.

From 1958 to 1960, Freire developed the series “Sudamérica” (South America), in which she used polygons in a reductive palette. In following years she experimented with a more expressive palette and symbols, which resulted in the series "Capricorn" and "Córdoba". In the series "Vibrante" (Vibrant), developed from 1975 to 1985, the emphasis was on light and color. In the early 1990s she started on a series "El oro de los tigres" (The Gold of Tigers) in which dark structures were placed on yellow backgrounds. By the late 1990s, the geometry of her work was characterized by the sensuality of color.

From 1954 to 1992, Freire had 17 solo exhibitions in Montevideo, Buenos Aires, São Paulo, Rio de Janeiro, Barcelona, Bruselas and Washington. She took part in many group exhibition and international biennales. In 1966 she represented Uruguay in the 33rd Venice Biennale.

As of 2000 she made a number of large-scale public sculptures.

The lifelong partnership with Costigliolo was such that their work tends to be considered almost as a unit. Costigliolo's death in 1985 was a great loss to her.

Freire's career was among the longest of any Uruguayan artist and she is a central reference for geometric art in the Río de la Plata region. Her work is included in the collections of the Museo Nacional de Artes Visuales, Juan Manuel Blanes Museum, Museu de Arte Moderna, São Paulo, Museu de Arte Moderna Rio de Janeiro, Museo Nacional Centro de Arte Reina Sofía, Museum of Modern Art New York and other private and public collections of Latin American art.

“At the end of my career, what I want is for my passion to continue and to finish my works with the same conviction and rigor“.

— María Freire

== Personal life ==
Freire was married to fellow artist, José Pedro Costigliolo, who she met in 1952. She died in 2015.

== Selected exhibitions ==
Solo exhibitions

- 1956: Museu de Arte Moderna (São Paulo, Brazil)
- 1956: Museu de Arte Moderna (Rio de Janeiro, Brazil)
- 1959: Galerie Les Contemporains (Brussels, Belgium)
- 1966: Panamerican Union (Washington D.C., United States)
- 1990: Exposición retrospectiva, Galería Bruzzone (Montevideo, Uruguay)
- 1998: Retrospectiva, Museo de Arte Contemporáneo (Montevideo, Uruguay)

Group exhibitions

- 1952: Arte no figurativo, Asociación Cristiana de Jóvenes (Montevideo, Uruguay)
- 1953: Arte no figurativo, Asociación Cristiana de Jóvenes (Montevideo, Uruguay)
- 1954: Pintura y escultura, Galería Salamanca (Montevideo, Uruguay)
- 1954: Costigliolo, Freire, Llorens, Galería Salamanca (Montevideo, Uruguay)
- 1955: 19 artistas de hoy, Subte Municipal (Montevideo, Uruguay)
- 1961: Pintores sudamericanos, Galería Sudamericana (New York, United States)
- 1992: From Torres García to Soto, Art Museum of the Americas (Washington D.C., United States)
- 1997: Latin American Art, First Site at the Minories (Colchester, United Kingdom)
- 1997: Arte Madí, Museo Nacional Centro de Arte Reina Sofía (Madrid, Spain)
- 2001: Arte abstracto del Río de la Plata, The Americas Society (New York, United States)
- 2002: Museo Rufino Tamayo (Mexico City, Mexico)
- 2011: América Fría: La abstracción geométrica en latinoamérica (1934-1973) (11 de febrero - 15 de mayo de 2011)

== Awards ==
Freire received several awards for her work, including:

- 1953: 3rd Prize Bronze medal, XVII Salón Nacional
- 1955: 2nd Prize Silver medal, XIX Salón Nacional
- 1957: Honorific Prize, 6th São Paulo Bienal
- 1960: Bronze medal, XXIV Salón Nacional
- 1961: 1st Prize Gold Medal, XXV Salón Nacional
- 1966: 1st Prize Gold Medal, XXX Salón Nacional
- 1967: Grand Painting Prize, XXXII Salón Nacional
- 1969: Acquisition Prize, XXXIII Salón Nacional
- 1970: Acquisition Prize, XXXIV Salón Nacional
- 1978: Gran Painting Prize, VII Salón de Primavera in Salto, (Uruguay)
- 1996: Premio Figari awarded by the Central Bank of Uruguay for lifetime achievement

In 2007, the 52nd Premio Nacional de Artes Visuales de Uruguay was named after Maria Freire in honor of her work and influence on younger generations.

A crater on the planet Mercury was named in her honor in November 2024.

== Selected works ==
- Untitled at the Museum of Modern Art, 1954
