= Carmen Garayalde =

Uruguayan teacher, exiled political activist, and artist

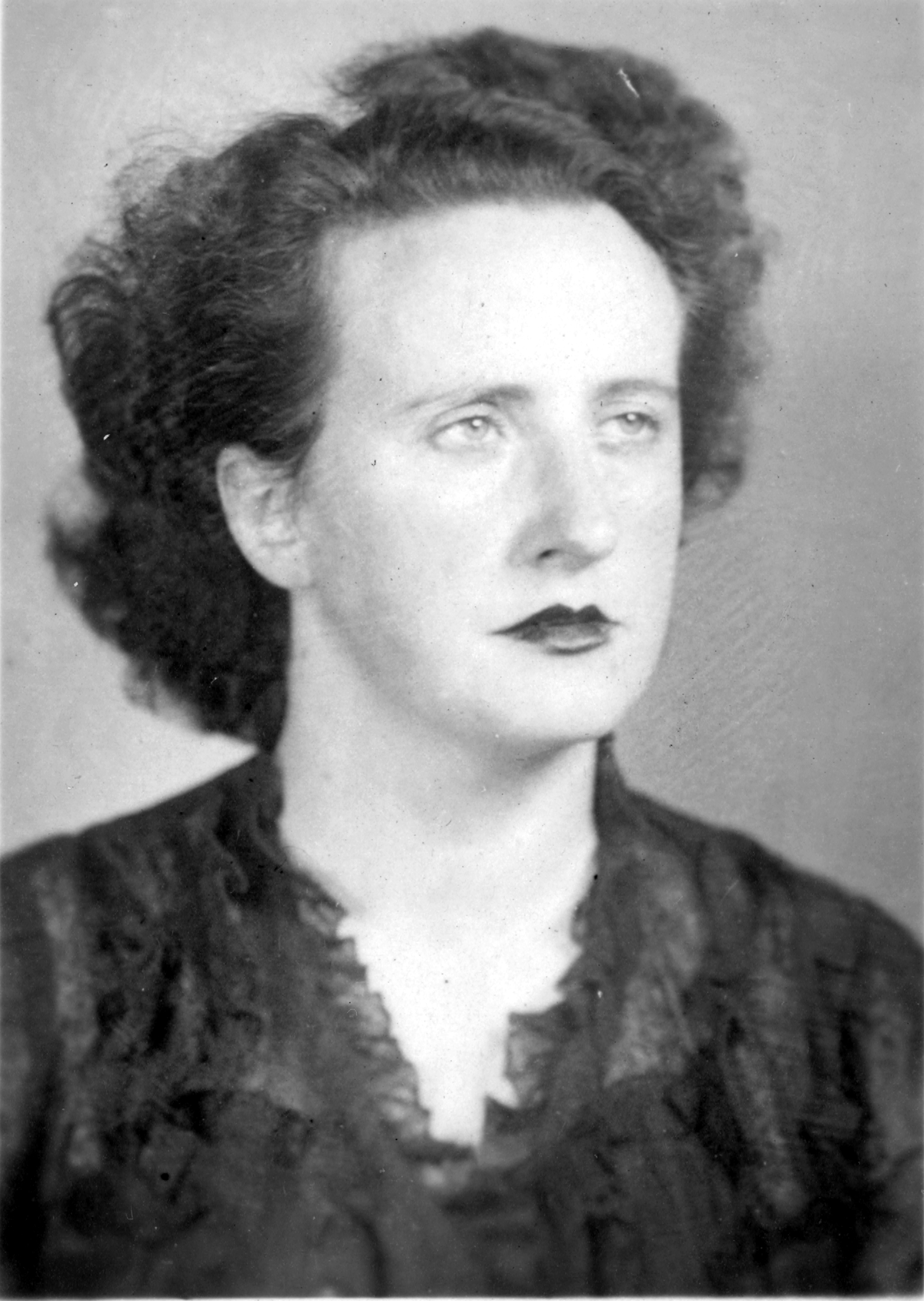
- Born: Carmen Garayalde Zubizarreta; August 8, 1913; Montevideo
- Died: September 8, 2002 (aged 89); Montevideo
- Occupations: Plastic artist, educator, painter
- Political party: Communist Party of Uruguay

Carmen Garayalde Zubizarreta (August 8, 1913 – September 8, 2002) was an Uruguayan teacher, exiled political activist, and artist.

== Biography ==
Carmen Garayalde was born on August 8, 1913, in Montevideo, Uruguay, to a financially secure family of Basque immigrants. In her youth, she studied singing and the violin, and would join the chamber orchestra of José Pedro Massera, formed by the friends and family of Massera Lerena, as a singer.

Garayalde studied painting at the Círculo de Bellas Artes, where she had as teachers Domingo Bazurro and Guillermo Laborde, the latter of which Garayalde would study under again at the University of Labor of Uruguay to learn about composition and decoration. She would also take lessons in painting and engraving from Cecilia Marcovich, Demetrio Urruchúa, and María Carmen Portela. Under Portela's direction, Garayalde began to develop the graphic technique of the drypoint.

Garayalde had a close friendship with Amalia Polleri, with whom she made a poster that unanimously won a contest held by the Commission of Ladies to send humanitarian aid to Spain in 1937. Two years later, the two women appeared at a show organized by Demetrio Urruchúa held at the Plaza de Cagancha.
