= Vignolo (surname) =

Vignolo is an Italian surname. Notable people with the surname include:

- Cecilia Vignolo (born 1971), Uruguayan visual artist, teacher, and communicator
- Julián Vignolo (born 2006), Argentine footballer
