= José Pedro Costigliolo =

Uruguayan painter and visual artist (born 1902)

- Born: November 6, 1902; Montevideo, Uruguay
- Died: June 3, 1985; Montevideo, Uruguay
- Known for: Painting, geometric abstraction
- Movement: Concrete art, Constructivism, Non-figurative art
- Spouse: María Freire
- Awards: Represented Uruguay at the Venice Biennale and São Paulo Art Biennial

José Pedro Costigliolo (born 6 November 1902 in Montevideo – died 3 June 1985 in Montevideo) was a Uruguayan painter and visual artist, considered a pioneer of geometric abstraction in Latin America. He played a foundational role in the development of non-figurative art in Uruguay alongside his wife, artist María Freire.

== Early life and education ==
Costigliolo was born in Montevideo, Uruguay, in 1902. He began his artistic education at the Círculo de Bellas Artes, where he studied under Domingo Bazzurro. In 1925, he received a scholarship to continue his studies in Italy. There, he became familiar with European avant-garde movements, which would later influence his shift toward geometric abstraction.

== Career ==
Initially trained in the figurative tradition, Costigliolo gradually moved toward abstraction during the 1930s and 1940s. In the 1950s, influenced by Constructivism and European geometric trends, he adopted a purely non-figurative visual language. His work focused on formal elements such as line, shape, and color, and emphasized balance and structure.

In 1952, Costigliolo co-founded the Grupo de Arte No Figurativo in Montevideo with María Freire. The group was one of the earliest collectives dedicated to abstraction in Latin America and sought to promote non-figurative art through exhibitions and publications.

Costigliolo represented Uruguay at several international exhibitions, including the Venice Biennale, the São Paulo Art Biennial, and exhibitions in the United States and Europe. His work was well received internationally and featured in significant Latin American abstraction retrospectives.

== Artistic style and legacy ==
Costigliolo’s paintings and works on paper are characterized by bold geometric compositions, a restrained color palette, and precise execution. His commitment to abstraction distinguished him from many of his Uruguayan contemporaries, and he was instrumental in introducing and legitimizing geometric abstraction in the region.

His works are held in major public collections, including the Museo Nacional de Artes Visuales in Montevideo and the Museo Reina Sofía in Madrid.

Costigliolo died in Montevideo in 1985.
