= Alejandro Zorrilla de San Martín =

Uruguayan political figure

Alejandro Zorrilla de San Martín Villegas (1909–1987) was a Uruguayan political figure.

== Background ==
He was a prominent member of the Uruguayan National (Blanco) Party. His grandfather was the poet and political figure Juan Zorrilla de San Martín.

== Public offices ==
He was elected a Deputy in 1954 and served as President of the Chamber of Deputies of Uruguay from March 1, 1960, to March 1, 1961. From 1963 to 1965 he was Foreign Affairs Minister of Uruguay; thereafter he served as member of the National Council of Government (Uruguay).

From 1966 to 1973 he served as a Senator.

=== Ambassador-designate and death ===
He died in 1987, shortly after being designated Ambassador to the Vatican, but before he was able to take up his post.

== See also ==
- Politics of Uruguay
- List of political families#Uruguay
