= Freire (crater) =

Crater on Mercury

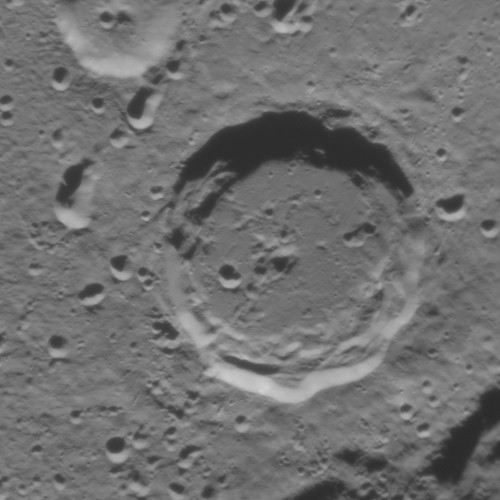
- MESSENGER NAC
- Planet: Mercury
- Coordinates: 73.36°S 214.46°W
- Quadrangle: Bach
- Diameter: 51.0 km (31.7 mi)
- Eponym: María Freire

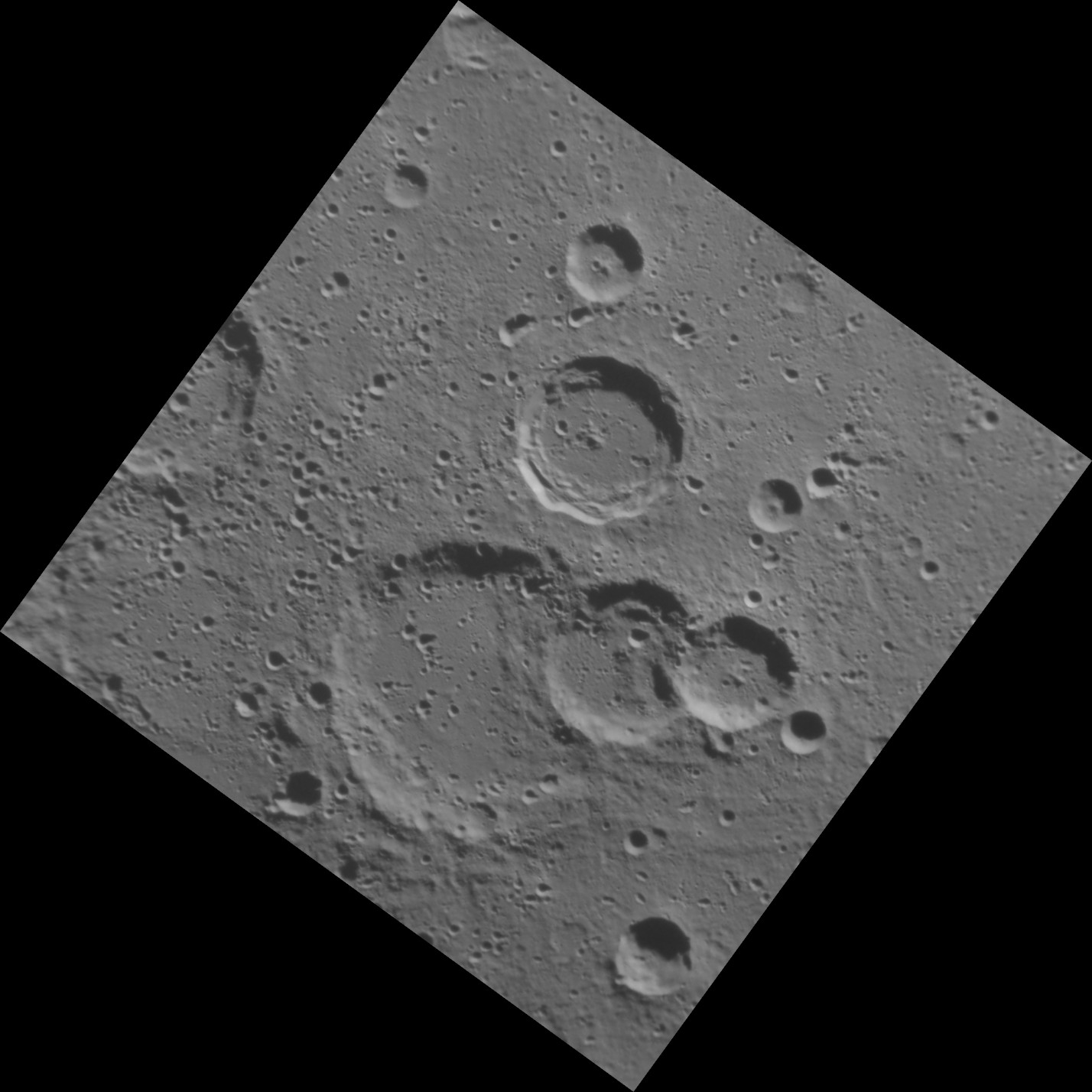
Context image with Freire above center

Freire is a crater on Mercury. Its name was adopted by the International Astronomical Union (IAU) on November 14, 2024. The crater is named for Uruguayan painter María Freire.

Freire is southwest of Codesido crater.
