= Cecilia Vignolo =

Uruguayan artist (born 1971)

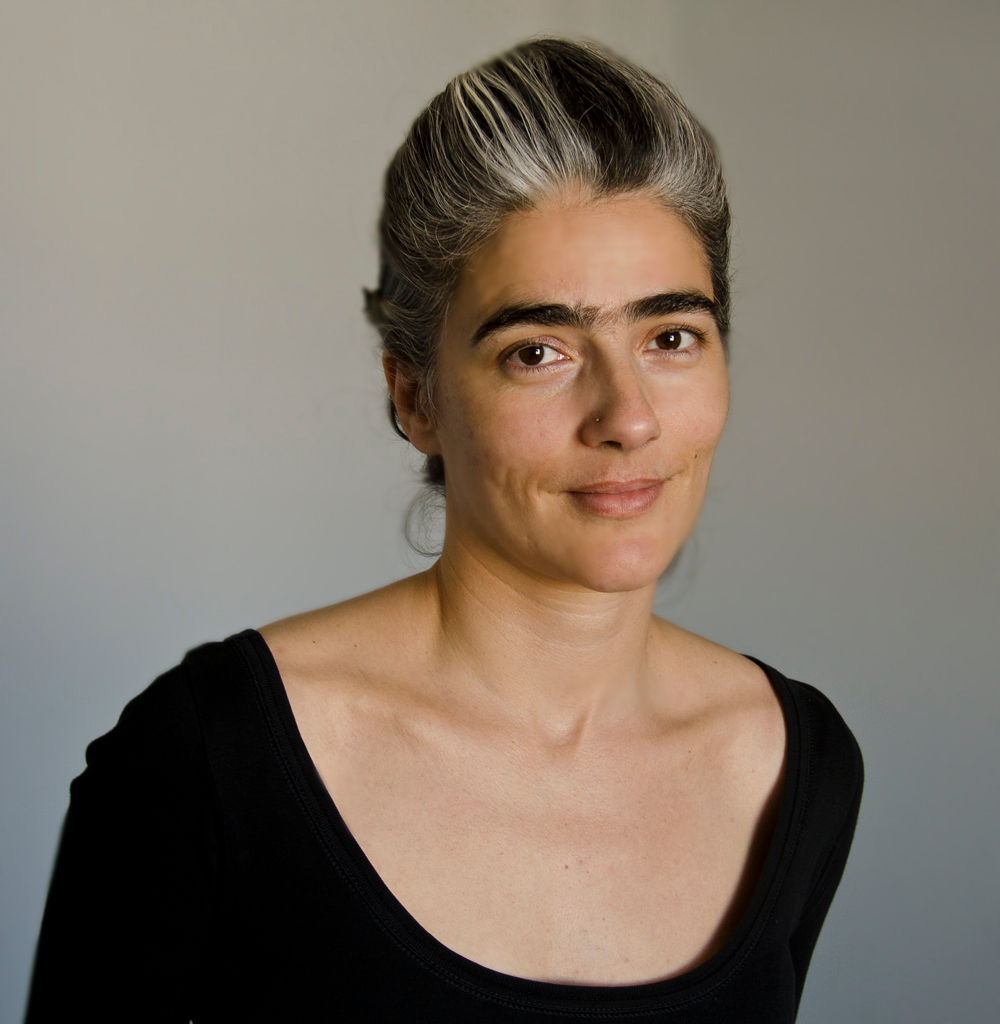
- 2012
- Born: 5 September 1971 (age 53); Montevideo, Uruguay
- Occupation(s): Sculptor, visual artist
- Website: www.ceciliavignolo.com

Cecilia Vignolo (born 5 September 1971) is a Uruguayan visual artist, teacher, and communicator.

She currently works in the communication area of Uruguay's National Museum of Visual Arts. Since 1991 she has held several exhibitions as a visual artist, both individually and collectively, and has won a series of awards and distinctions.

== Individual shows ==
- 1995 – "De las Américas", Teatro Macció, San José
- 1996 – "De los vientres de las más", (sound setting: Daniel Maggiolo), Cabildo y Archivo Histórico, Montevideo
- 1998 – "La exterioridad de la interioridad del cuerpo humano", Sala Vaz Ferreira, Montevideo
- 1998 – "Hay Corazón", La Creperie, Montevideo
- 2002 – "Respaldos", Colección Engelman Ost, Montevideo
- 2002 – "Yo soy", Museo del Azulejo, Montevideo
- 2005 – "Funciona", Carlson Tower Gallery, North Park University, Chicago, traveling at Unión Latina, Palacio Lapido, Montevideo
- 2005 – "Abrazario", Faculty of Architecture, November, Montevideo
- 2006 – "Hay algo más que quiera decir”, Sala Dirección Nacional de Cultura, MEC, Montevideo
- 2009 – "El reverso del paisaje", Juan Manuel Blanes Museum, Montevideo

== Awards ==
- 1977 – First Prize, Painting Contest at the Garden Club of Punta del Este
- 1984 – First Prize, School Contest of the Ministry of Public Health, collective
- 1992 – Paul Cézanne Revelation Award, Museum of Visual Arts, Montevideo
- 1995 – First Prize, United Award, American Museum, Maldonado
- 1995 – Honorable Mention, Municipal Hall, Installation, Montevideo
- 1997 – Honorable Mention, First Craft Object Biennial, Montevideo
- 1999 – Under-Thirty Award, Municipal Hall, Montevideo
- 2001 – Special Award, 49th National Salon of Visual Arts, "Salon de Belleza", Montevideo
- 2001 – First Prize, Municipal Hall, collective installation "Imaginario Montevideo", Montevideo
- 2002 – Honorable Mention, Municipal Hall, installation "ser / estar", Montevideo
- 2007 – Paul Cézanne Award, Second Prize, Montevideo
- 2007 – National María Freire Award, First Eduardo Víctor Haedo Prize
- 2013 – Fundación Unión Award, 10th Salto Biennial, Salto, Uruguay
