= La leyenda patria =

1879 national epic by Juan Zorrilla de San Martín

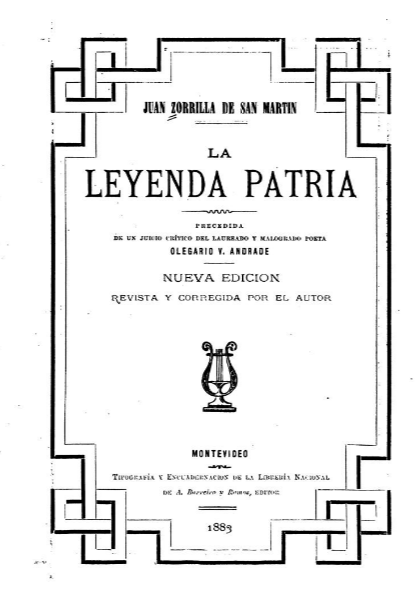
- Title page for La leyenda patria (1883 edition)
- Author: Juan Zorrilla de San Martín
- Original title: La leyenda patria
- Language: Spanish
- Genre: Romanticism, poem
- Publication date: 1879
- Publication place: Uruguay

La leyenda patria (Spanish: [la leˈʝenda ˈpatɾja]; leyenda in Uruguayan Spanish: [leˈʒenda, -ˈʃenda]; The Fatherland Legend) is a national epic by Uruguayan poet Juan Zorrilla de San Martín written in 1879.

The poem is a late-19th century romantic chanson de geste of the Río de la Plata revolutionary group known as the Thirty-Three Orientals, whose actions culminated in the foundation of modern Uruguay. With 413 verses, it was written within a week and recited by the author at the dedication of the Villa de la Florida monument to independence. It was considered a feat and gained immediate popularity, which earned Zorrilla de San Martín the title of Poet of the Fatherland.
