= Guma Zorrilla =

Uruguayan costume designer (1919–2001)

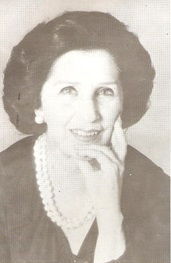
- Born: Guma Zorrilla de San Martín Muñoz; 28 December 1919; Montevideo, Uruguay
- Died: 19 June 2001 (aged 81); Montevideo, Uruguay
- Occupation: Designer
- Spouse: Hugo Estrázulas
- Children: 6

Guma Zorrilla de San Martín Muñoz (28 December 1919 – 19 July 2001) was a Uruguayan costume designer for theater, film, and television.

== Early life ==
Zorrilla was born in Montevideo, in 1919, one of five daughters of the sculptor José Luis Zorrilla de San Martín and Guma Muñoz del Campo. She always drew and painted, as well as exhibited her watercolors, drawings and pastels at the Amigos del Arte as a teenager.

== Later life ==
Zorrilla's long career in Montevideo was supplemented by time spent in Buenos Aires, especially providing services for theatrical and cinematographic works of her sister, the actress and director China Zorrilla. Her work appeared at the Comedia Nacional and in the Solís Theatre. She is remembered for creating works in the productions for Shakespeare's Romeo and Juliet, Thornton Wilder's Our Town, Alfred de Musset's Lorenzaccio, Medea of Euripides, The honour is not thing of women, (with Norma Aleandro). She worked with various directors and actors of Uruguay and Argentina, including Omar Grasso, Antonio Larreta, Estela Medina, Dahd Sfeir, Carlos Perciavalle and others. She had a visible ease with suits, integrating them in a scene's visual frame. She took special delight in Belle Époque costumes of the 19th century. Some examples include Ávila-Martínez Mieres in The Parisienne and nuptial Mulch. She also had opportunity to provide her services at the City Theatre of Montevideo in The Seagull, La pulga en la oreja, Un enredo y un marqués and La Dorotea. Zorrilla was the changing rooms manager for the films Besos en la frente (1996) and Nunca estuve en Viena (1986).

== Personal life ==
She married Hugo Estrázulas and they had six children. Zorrilla died in Montevideo in 2001.

== Selected works ==
- Guma Zorrilla, artista del género, 2012, ediciones CIDDAE, Montevideo.
