= Juan Zorrilla de San Martín =

Uruguayan poet (1855–1931)

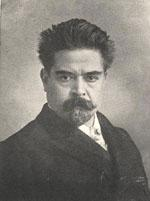
- Born: Juan Zorrilla de San Martín; 28 December 1855; Montevideo, Uruguay
- Died: 3 November 1931 (aged 75); Montevideo, Uruguay
- Occupations: Writer, poet, ambassador
- Spouses: Elvira Blanco Sienra; Concepción Blanco Sienra
- Children: 13, including José Luis Zorrilla de San Martín

Signature
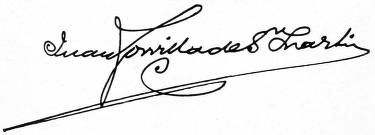

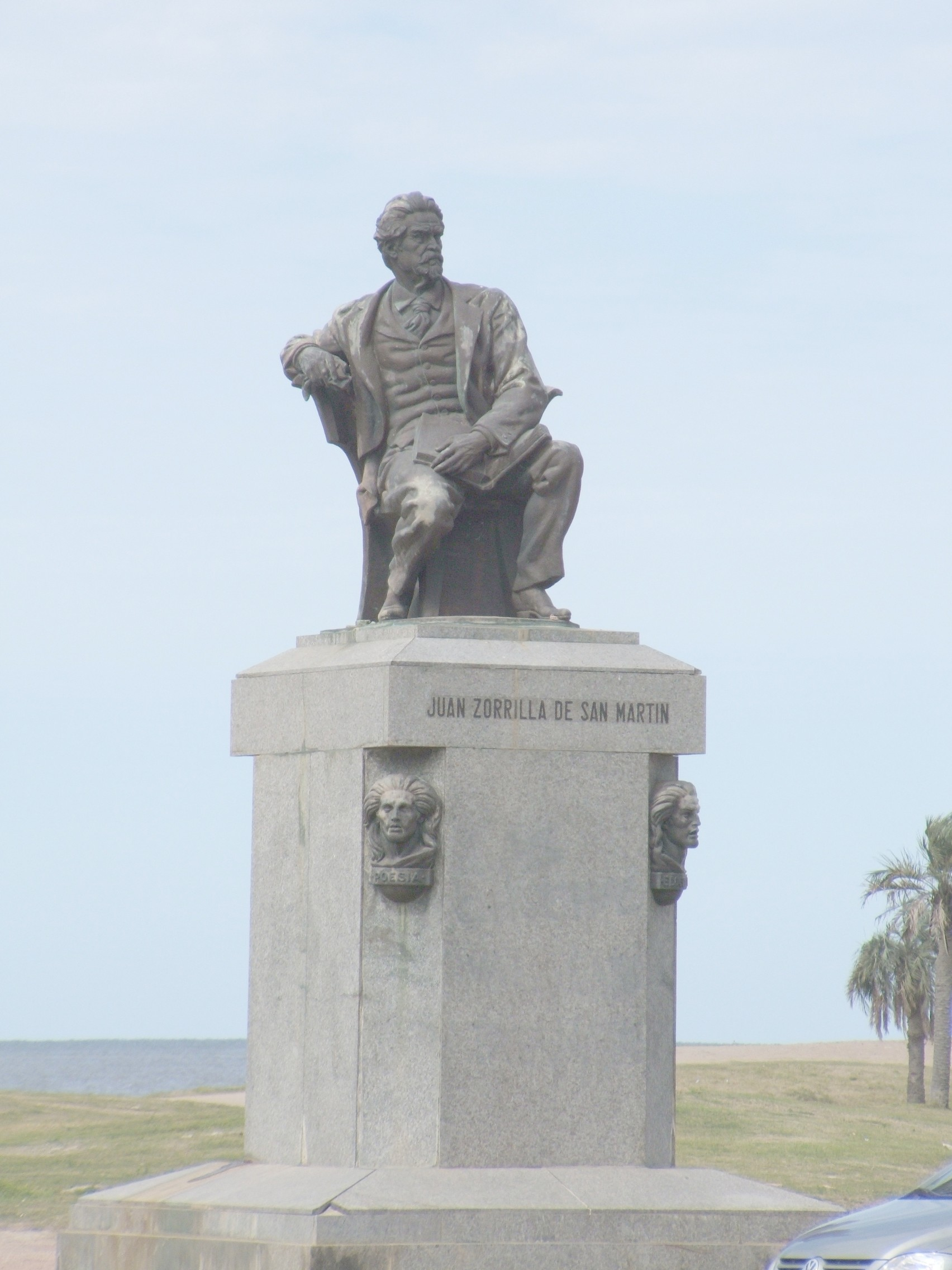
Zorrilla sculpture in Montevideo by his son José Luis Zorrilla de San Martín

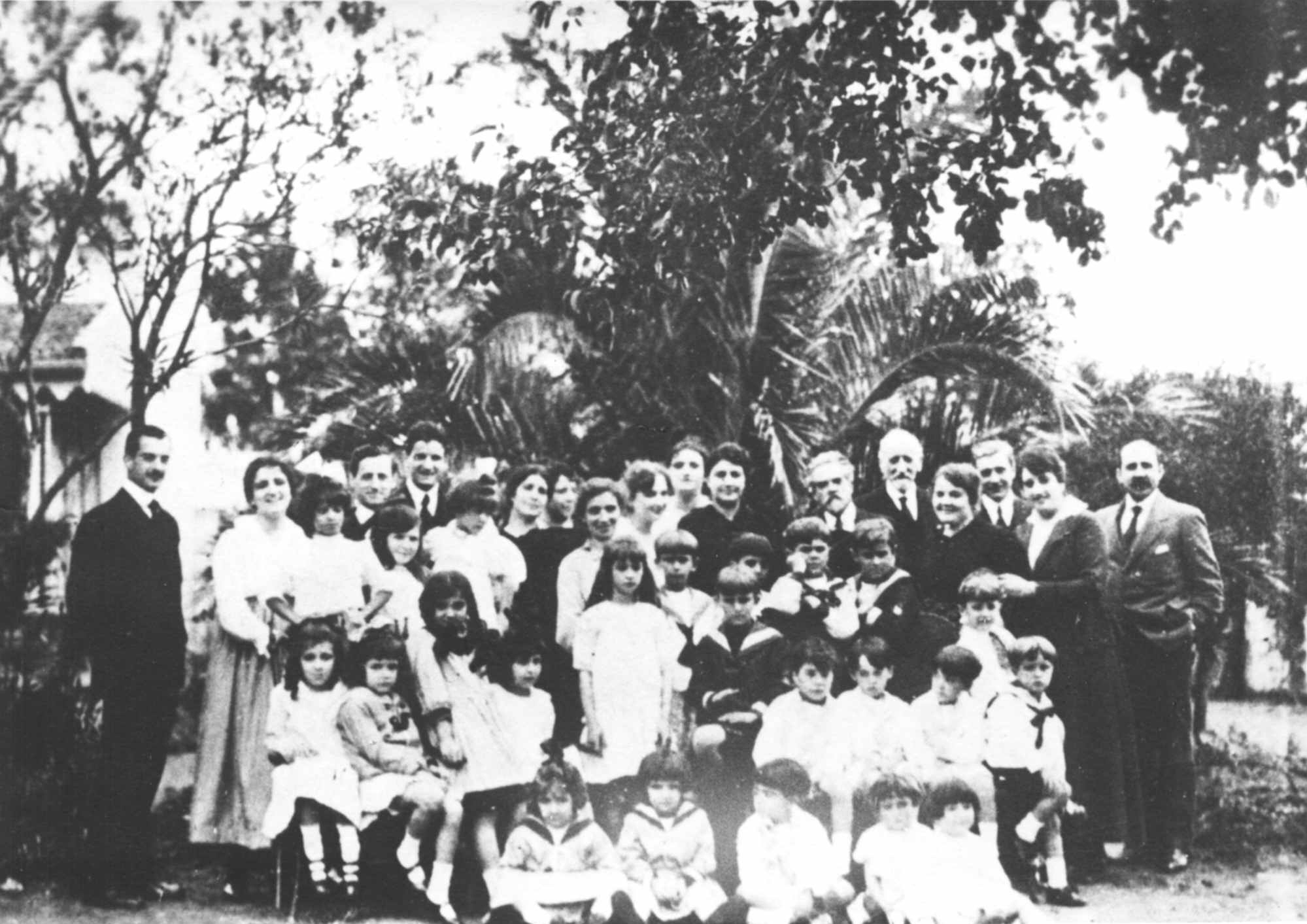
The patriarch Zorrilla and his family

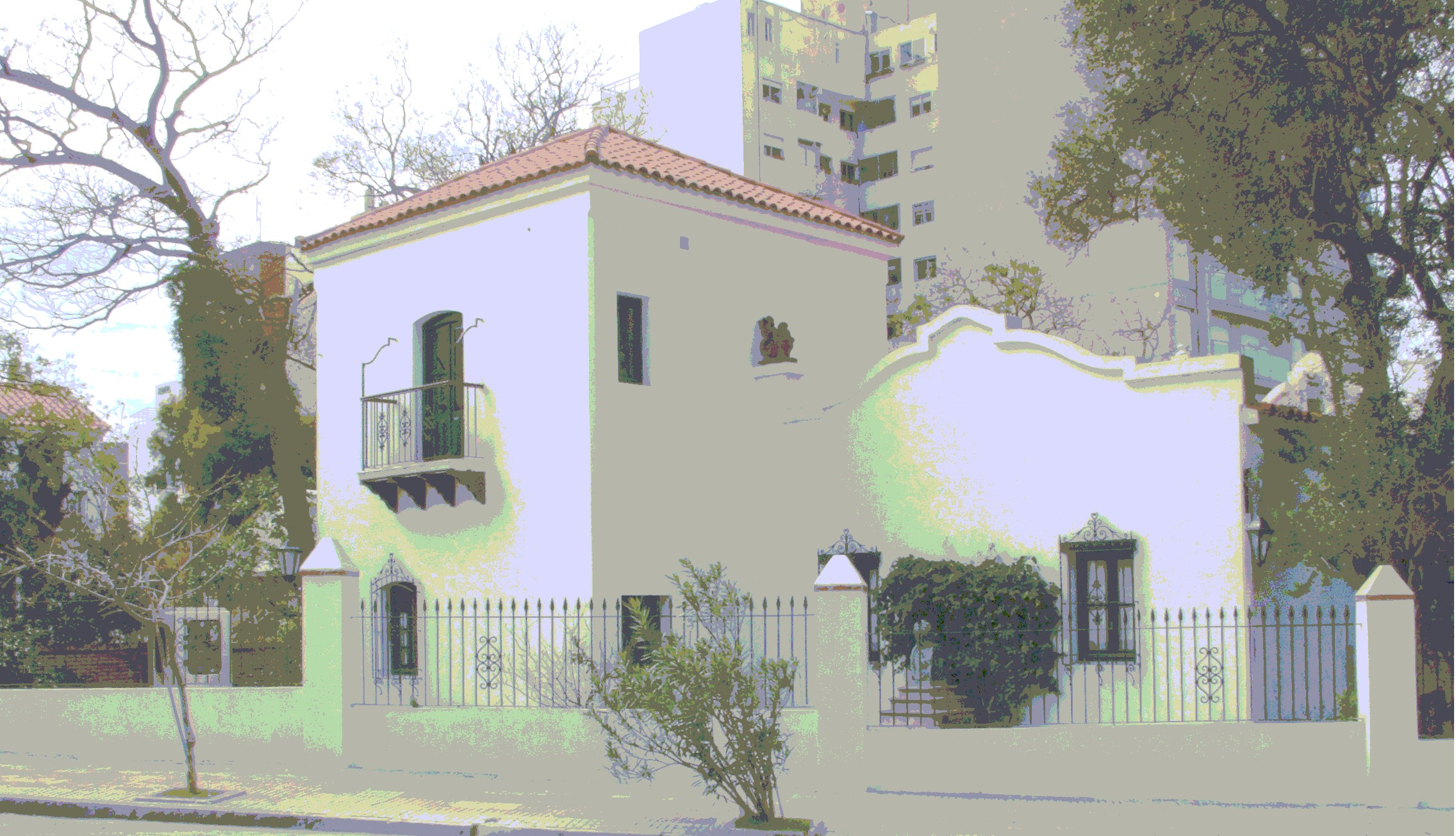
Zorrilla museum in Montevideo

Juan Zorrilla de San Martín (28 December 1855 – 3 November 1931) was an Uruguayan epic poet and political figure. He is referred to as the "National Poet of Uruguay".

== Personal background ==
As a political figure, Zorrilla served as a Deputy for Montevideo from 1888 to 1891 and served as ambassador several periods. He also worked as a journalist and helped establish the Catholic newspaper El Bien Público.

He was twice widowed, and left 13 children when he died, one of whom was José Luis Zorrilla de San Martín. His grandson Alejandro Zorrilla de San Martín was to serve as a prominent Deputy, Minister and Senator. One of his granddaughters was actress China Zorrilla. Another granddaughter, Guma Zorrilla, was a theater costume designer.

== Honours ==
Zorrilla's home in Montevideo is now a museum. He was featured in the 20,000 pesos banknote (1989–1991), and is featured on the 20 pesos note (since 1994).

== Works ==
=== Poems ===
- Notas de un himno (1877)
- La leyenda patria (1879)
- Tabaré (1888)
- La epopeya de Artigas (1910)
- Rimas y leyendas:
  - El ángel de los charrúas
  - Imposible
  - Odio y amor
  - Siemprevivas
  - Tu y yo
  - Himno al árbol
  - Vestales

=== Essays ===
- Discurso de La Rábida (1892)
- Resonancia del camino (1896)
- Huerto cerrado (1900)
- Conferencias y discursos (1905),
- Detalles de la historia rioplatense (1917)
- El sermón de la paz (1924)
- El libro de Rut (1928)
- Ituzaingó
- Artigas

== See also ==
- List of Uruguayan writers
- Politics of Uruguay
- List of political families#Uruguay
