= Olga Piria =

Uruguayan artist, pianist and goldsmith

María Olga Piria de Jaureguay
- Born: 28 April 1927; Montevideo
- Died: 30 July 2015 (aged 88); Montevideo
- Occupations: Artist, goldsmith, pianist

María Olga Piria de Jaureguay (28 April 1927 – 30 July 2015) was a Uruguayan artist, pianist and goldsmith, who was a pupil of Joaquín Torres García.

== Biography ==
Piria was born in Montevideo on 28 April 1927. From 1941 to 1943 she studied at the Círculo de Bellas Artes. From 1944 to 1949 she was taught by Joaquín Torres García and his son in their communal studio. At the same time she studied music and taught at the Montevideo Conservatiore. In 1957 she began to design pieces which were made by her husband Carlos Jaureguay. Piria had taught herself how to design and make jewellery, specialising in decorative goldwork. From 1960 she focussed on her work as a jeweller, to the exclusion of painting, which she returned to in 1976.

During her lifetime she exhibited in over 150 exhibitions, including at the Museum of Modern Art of Latin America, alongside Jaime Nowinski and Glauco Cappozzoli, at the Cultural Department of Bank of America, and in many other national and international settings. Her works are held in both public and private collections, including: National Museum of Visual Arts, as part of the collection formed at the Mexico Olympics, in the Engelman-Ost Collection in Uruguay, amongst others. She died on 30 July 2015 in Montevideo, at the age of 88.

== Awards ==
- Golden Candelabra Award (2007).
