= Domingo Laporte =

Uruguayan painter and engraver (1855–1928)

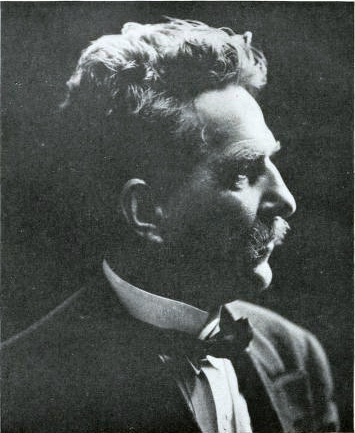
- Born: October 19, 1855; Montevideo
- Died: 1928 (aged 72–73); Montevideo
- Known for: the first director of the National Museum of Fine Arts
- Notable work: "Courtyard of the Palazzo della Signoria," "Autumn Twilight – Venice, Seen from the Lido," "Heavy Reading," "The Lagoon at Dawn – Venice," and "The Grand Canal, Seen from the Accademia Bridge – Venice"
- Parents: Hipólito Laporte (father); Juanna Saparrat (mother)

Domingo Laporte (October 19, 1855 – 1928) was a Uruguayan painter and engraver who gained international recognition and became the first director of the National Museum of Fine Arts.

== Biography ==
The son of Juanna Saparrat and Hipólito Laporte, he was educated in France and Italy. His teacher was the painter Giovanni Fattori, whose stepdaughter he married. He taught at the Arts and Trades School between 1879 and 1883. In 1889, the school sent him to Italy to recruit teachers for the institution, and at the same time, he was responsible for overseeing all students sent to study in Italy. He returned from Italy in 1896 and, in addition to his work as a painter, he devoted himself to teaching painting and drawing.

At the end of 1911, the National Museum of Fine Arts (now called the National Museum of Visual Arts) was established, and Laporte was appointed as its director. He held the position until his death in 1928 and was succeeded by Ernesto Laroche.

== Works ==
Among his most famous works are "An Arab," "Courtyard of the Palazzo della Signoria," "The Prayer of an Arab," "The Miser," "Autumn Twilight – Venice, Seen from the Lido," "Heavy Reading," "Against the Grain," "Flattering Contemplation," "The Musketeer," "The Ciociaro," "Palazzo Labia – Venice," "The Lagoon at Dawn – Venice," and "The Grand Canal, Seen from the Accademia Bridge – Venice." The latter work earned him an honorable mention at the 1889 Paris Exposition.

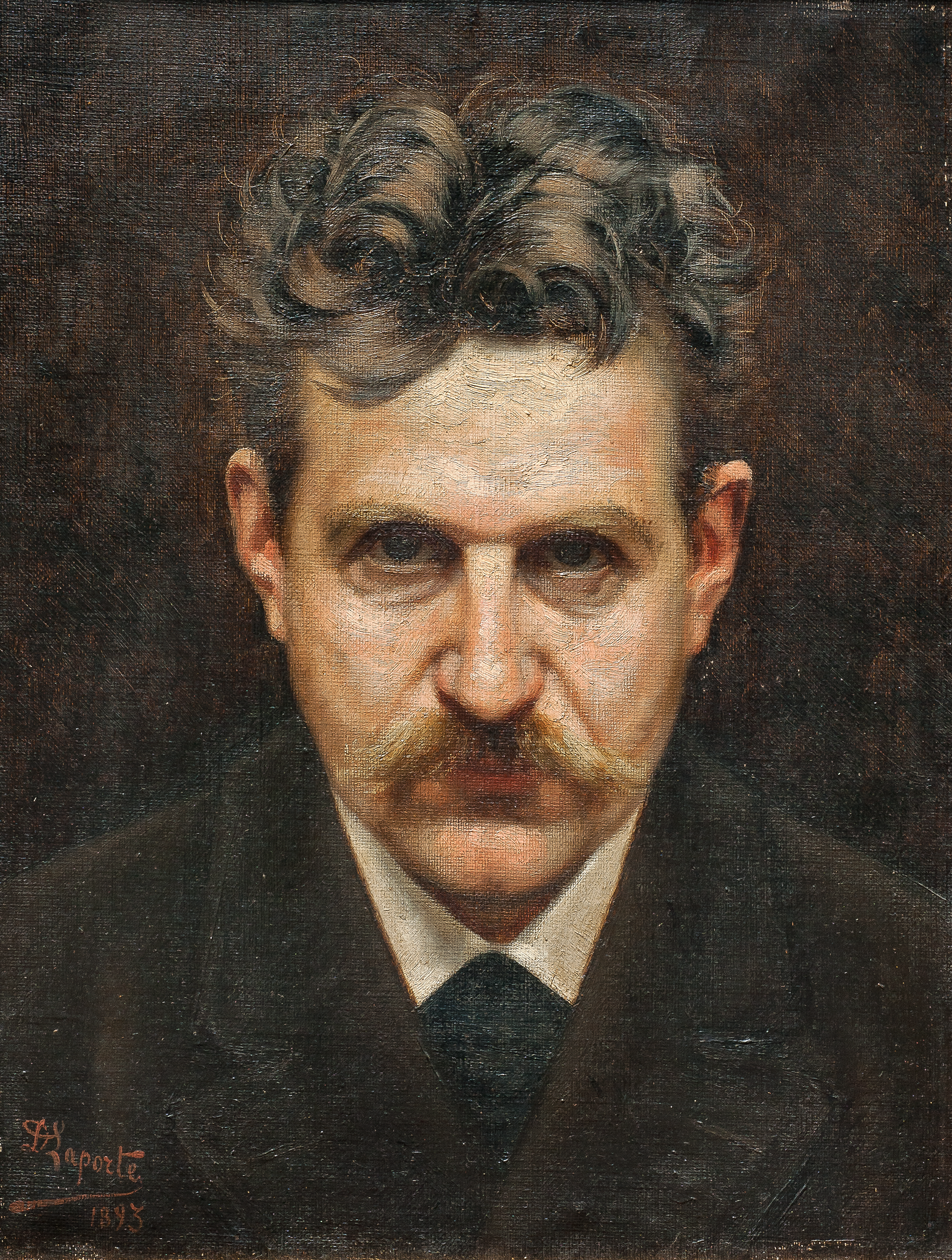
Domingo Laporte-Self-portrait

He primarily focused on portraiture, although he was also involved in other genres such as landscape and marine painting. The National Museum of Visual Arts houses a collection of engravings using the etching technique, which was introduced to Uruguay by Laporte. This collection includes "Portrait of Giovanni Fattori," "Pines in the Apennines," "Livorno Countryside," "Small Shipyard," "Montevideo Bay," and "Etruscan Theater."

His works are primarily found in the Juan Manuel Blanes Museum, the Ernesto Laroche Museum, and in private galleries and collections in Uruguay. The National Historical Museum also holds his oil paintings "Portrait of Don Juan Lindolfo Cuestas" (1899) and "Portrait of Don José Batlle y Ordóñez" (1903).

In 1997, the National Postal Administration issued a stamp featuring his work "Autumn Twilight – Venice".
