= Josefa Palacios =

Uruguayan painter (died 1881)

Claudia Josefa Palacios González
- Born: Claudia Josefa Palacios González; Early 19th century Colonia del Sacramento, Uruguay
- Died: 1881; Buenos Aires, Argentina
- Known for: Painting, Miniature painting
- Notable work: Desembarco de los Treinta y Tres Orientales (Landing of the Thirty-Three Orientals)
- Style: Figurative, Historical painting
- Spouse: Manuel Gómez de la Gándara (m. 1841)
- Parents: Pedro Antonio Palacios (father); Rosa González Amores (mother)
- Relatives: Aurelio Palacios (nephew), Alfredo Palacios (grand-nephew)
- Memorials: A street named in her honor in Montevideo (1997); * A street named after her in Colonia del Sacramento (2019)

Claudia Josefa Palacios González (died 1881) was an Uruguayan painter and miniaturist of the nineteenth century. She is best known for creating the first visual representation of Uruguayan independence episode known as Desembarco de los Treinta y Tres Orientales (Landing of the Thirty-Three Orientals).

== Life ==
Josefa Palacios was born in Colonia del Sacramento in the early years of the 19th century, into a patrician family. She was the daughter of Pedro Antonio Palacios and Rosa González Amores. As stated in the newspaper "El Comercio del Plata" of 1849 at the age of twelve she already handled both the pencil and the brush with ease.

In 1841, Palacios married the Spaniard Manuel Gómez de la Gándara. After she was married she lived in Montevideo and later moved to Buenos Aires.

Josefa Palacios died in 1881.

One of her nephews, Aurelio Palacios, was the father of the Argentine socialist politician Alfredo Palacios.

== Desembarco de los Treinta y Tres Orientales ==
In 1849 and 1854 she was working on her art piece Landing of the Thirty Three Orientals (Desembarco de los Treinta y Tres Orientales), an oil painting on canvas that became the first representation in the visual arts of the landing of Thirty Three Orientals on the Playa de la Agraciada in 1825.

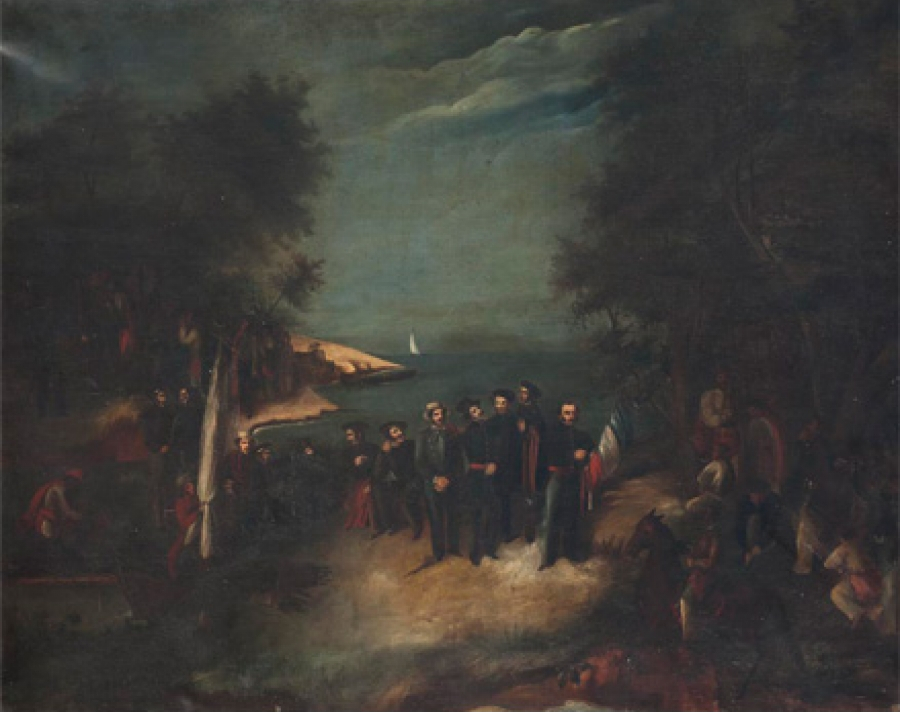
Desembarco de los Treinta y Tres Orientales

The painting represents a poorly lit night landscape, appearing in the center Juan Antonio Lavalleja, who in his left hand holds the blue, white and red tricolor flag, with a group of components of the liberating expedition and in the background, in the center, you can see the Uruguay River and a boat that is moving away.

This work was painted by Josefa Palacios twenty-three years before her compatriot Juan Manuel Blanes depicted the same historical event. The painting belongs to the collection of the Museo Histórico Nacional since 1911 when it was donated by Palacios’ children.

In 1913 the painting was restored for the first time by the painter Ernesto Laroche.

Until 2012, the painting Landing of the Thirty-Three Orientales had remained almost unnoticed by the Uruguayan public when Prof. Sonia Bandrymer carried out the research the realization of "Active Art. Digital catalog of artists visuals of Uruguay".

There are few records and testimonies of the rest of her pictorial works, including the portrait of María Ortiz Laguna de Argentó, her daughter, and Florencio Varela. Francisco Acuña de Figueroa suggests other works by Palacios include an effigy of her husband and a painting of the Virgin Mary.

== Honors ==
In 1997, the Departmental Board of Montevideo named after Palacios a street in the Paso de la Arena neighborhood in Montevideo.

In 2019, another street in the city of Colonia del Sacramento was named after her.

Currently the Regional Historical Archive located in Colonia del Sacramento, has as its headquarters in the "Casa de Palacios" where Palacios lived.
