= Raúl Javiel Cabrera =

Uruguayan painter

Raúl Javiel Cabrera (2 December 1919 – 28 December 1992) was an Uruguayan painter. He signed his paintings Raúl Javiel Cabrera or Javiel Raúl Cabrera.
