= Guillermo Laborde =

Uruguayan painter, sculptor and graphic designer (1886–1940)

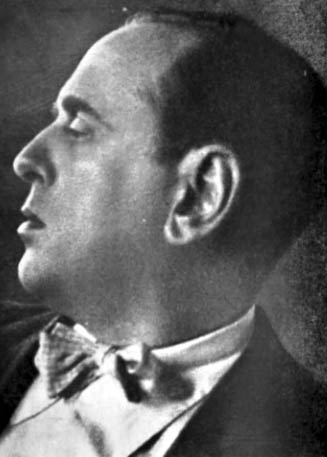
- Born: October 24, 1886; Montevideo
- Died: May 13, 1940 (aged 53); Montevideo
- Occupations: Painter, sculptor

Guillermo Laborde (24 October 1886 – 13 May 1940) was an Uruguayan painter, sculptor and designer.

== Biography ==
He received his first art lessons at the Círculo de Bellas Artes in Montevideo with Carlos María Herrera. After 1912, he studied in Florence, Rome, Paris and Spain; supported by a grant from the Uruguayan government. He returned to Montevideo in 1921 and, in 1923, began working as a teacher at the Escuela Industrial, the Círculo Fomento de Bellas Artes and the Institutos Normales de Montevideo.

Together with José Cuneo Perinetti, Carmelo de Arzadun, Alfredo De Simone and Petrona Viera he became one of the founders of the "Planismo" movement; named after their technique of painting in austere, geometric "planes" with bright colors. His portrait of the art critic, Luis Eduardo Pombo (1900-1976) is considered to be a prime example of that style.

In addition to painting, he also created sculptures and graphic designs, as well as designs for costumes, theater and carnival sets. His best known design was the official poster for the first FIFA World Cup in 1930; which was awarded first prize in a competition held by the Centennial Commission.

He died suddenly after completing the set designs for a performance of La damnation de Faust, produced by SODRE.

== Selected works ==
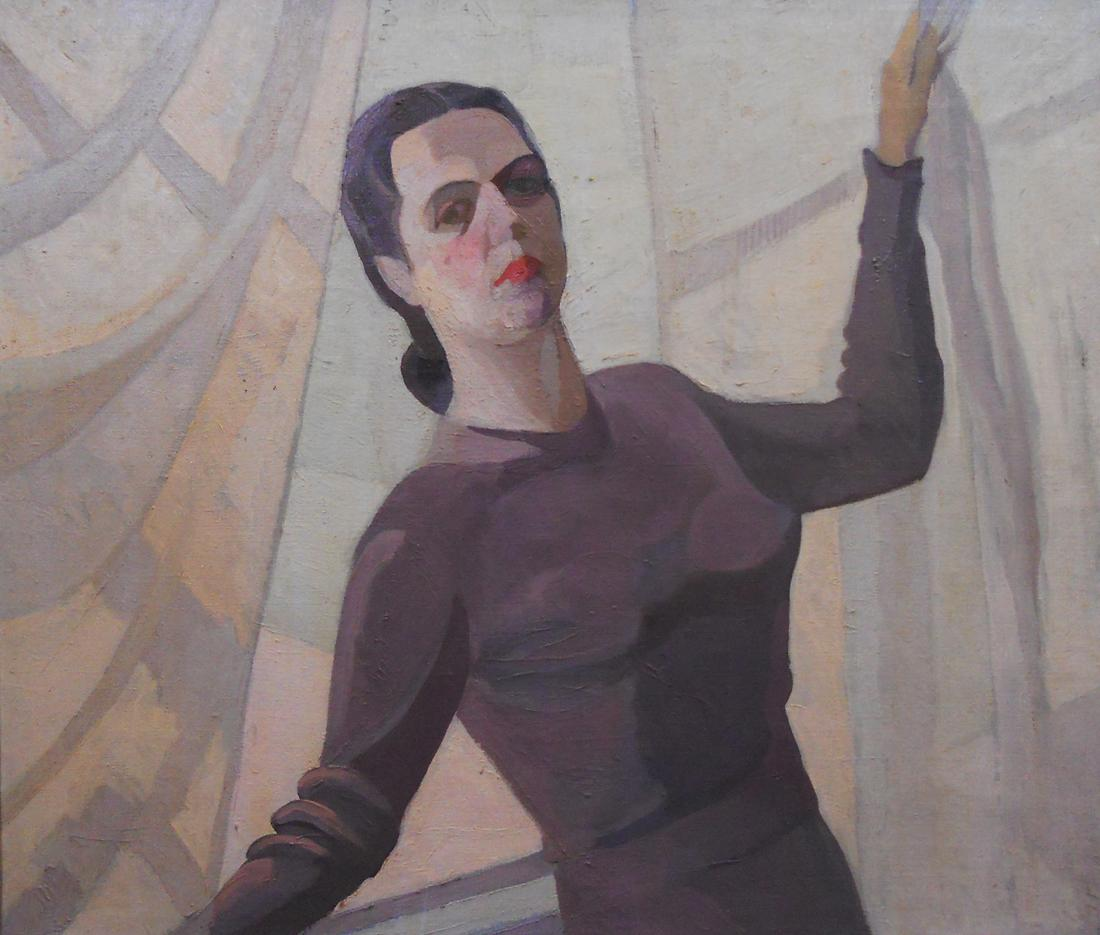
Portrait of Petrona Viera

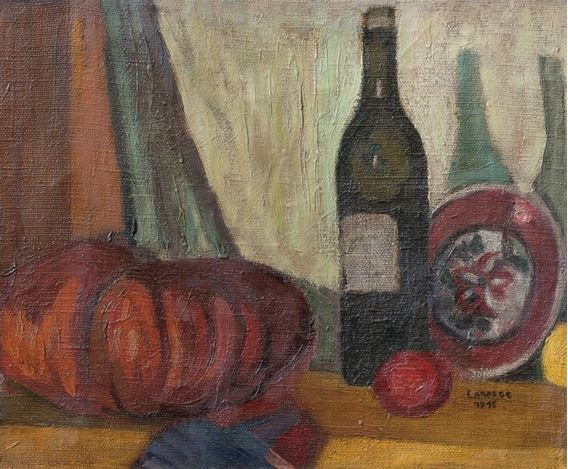
Still life

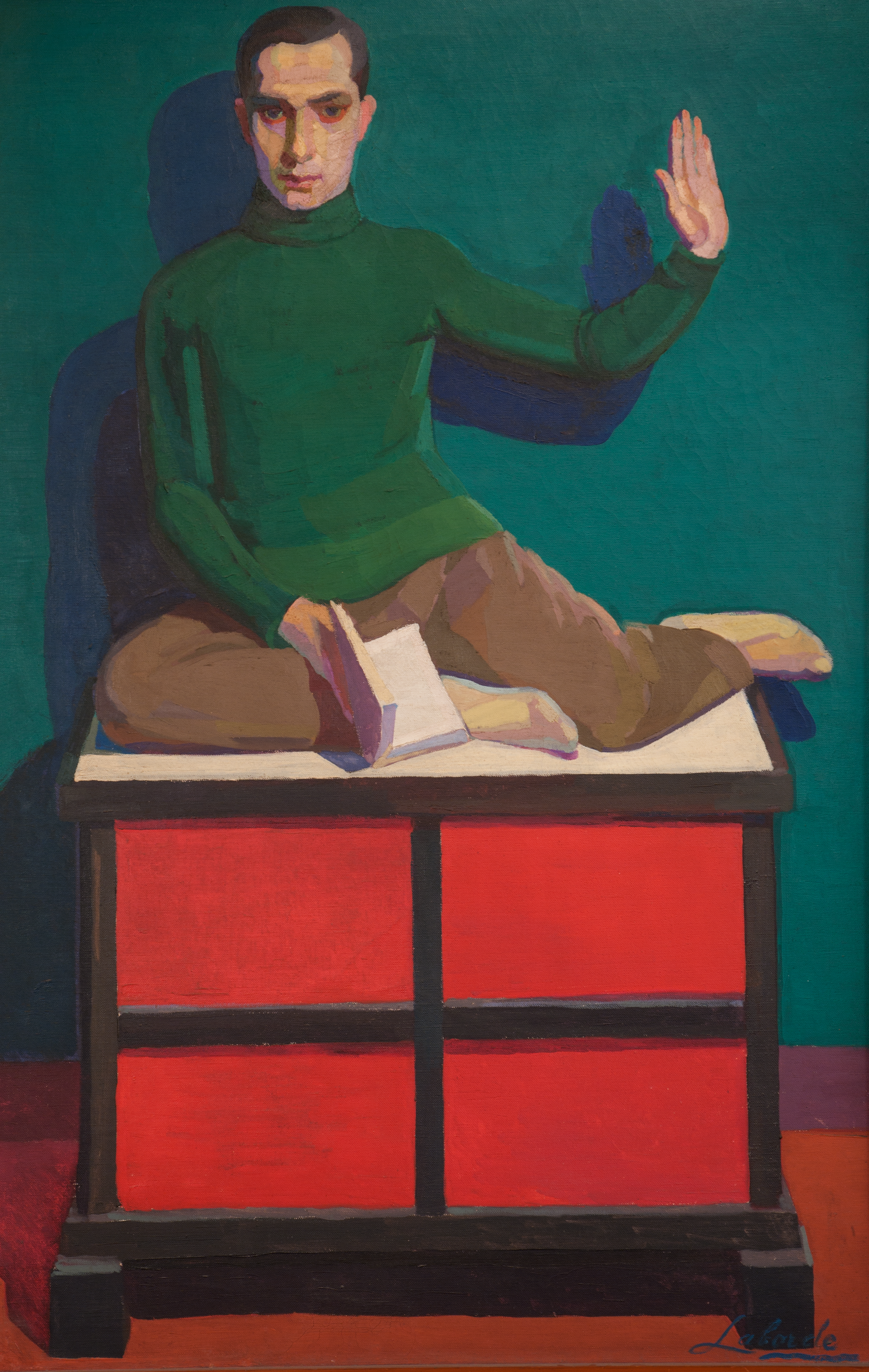
Portrait of Luis Eduardo Pombo

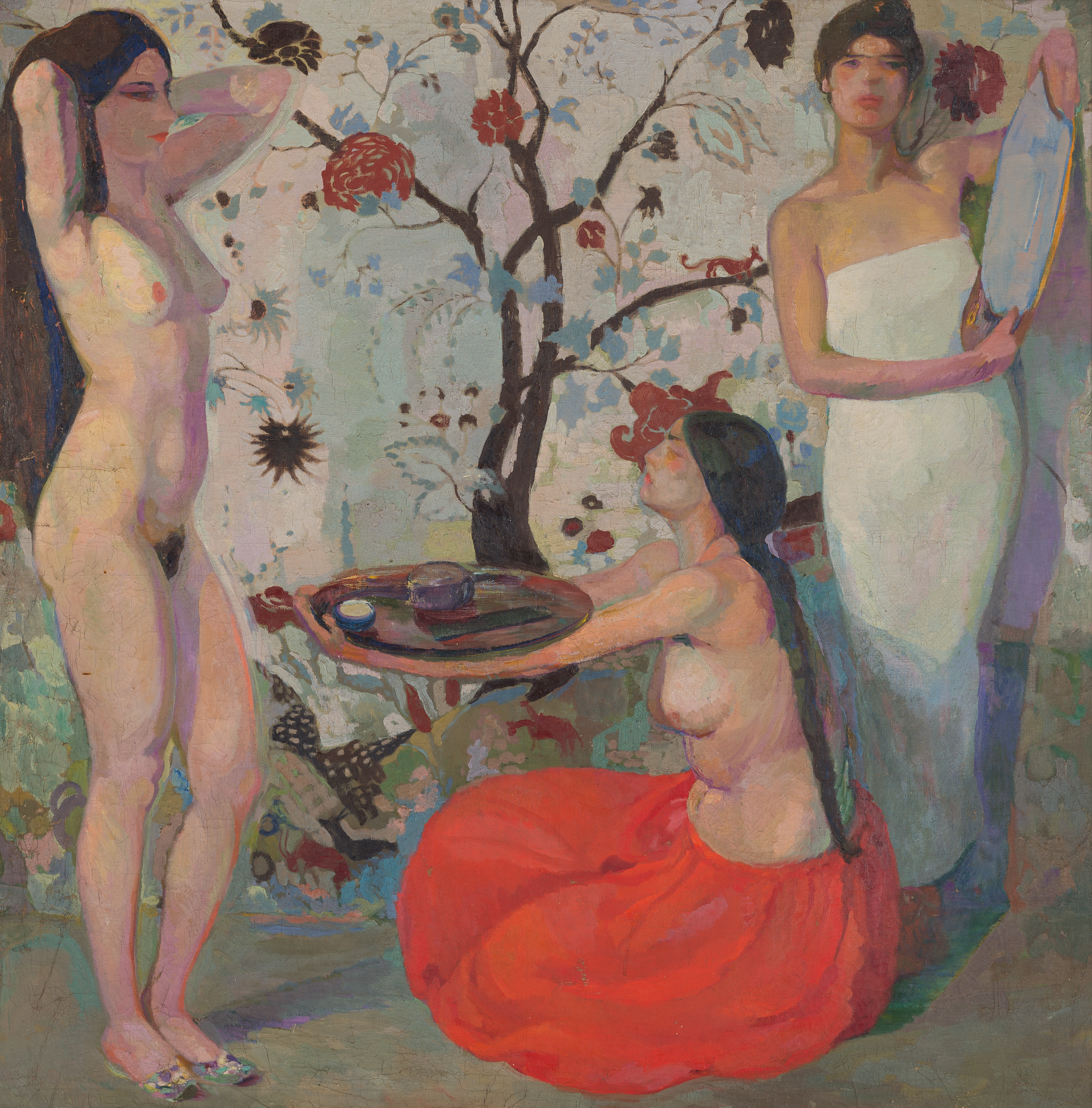
The Mirror

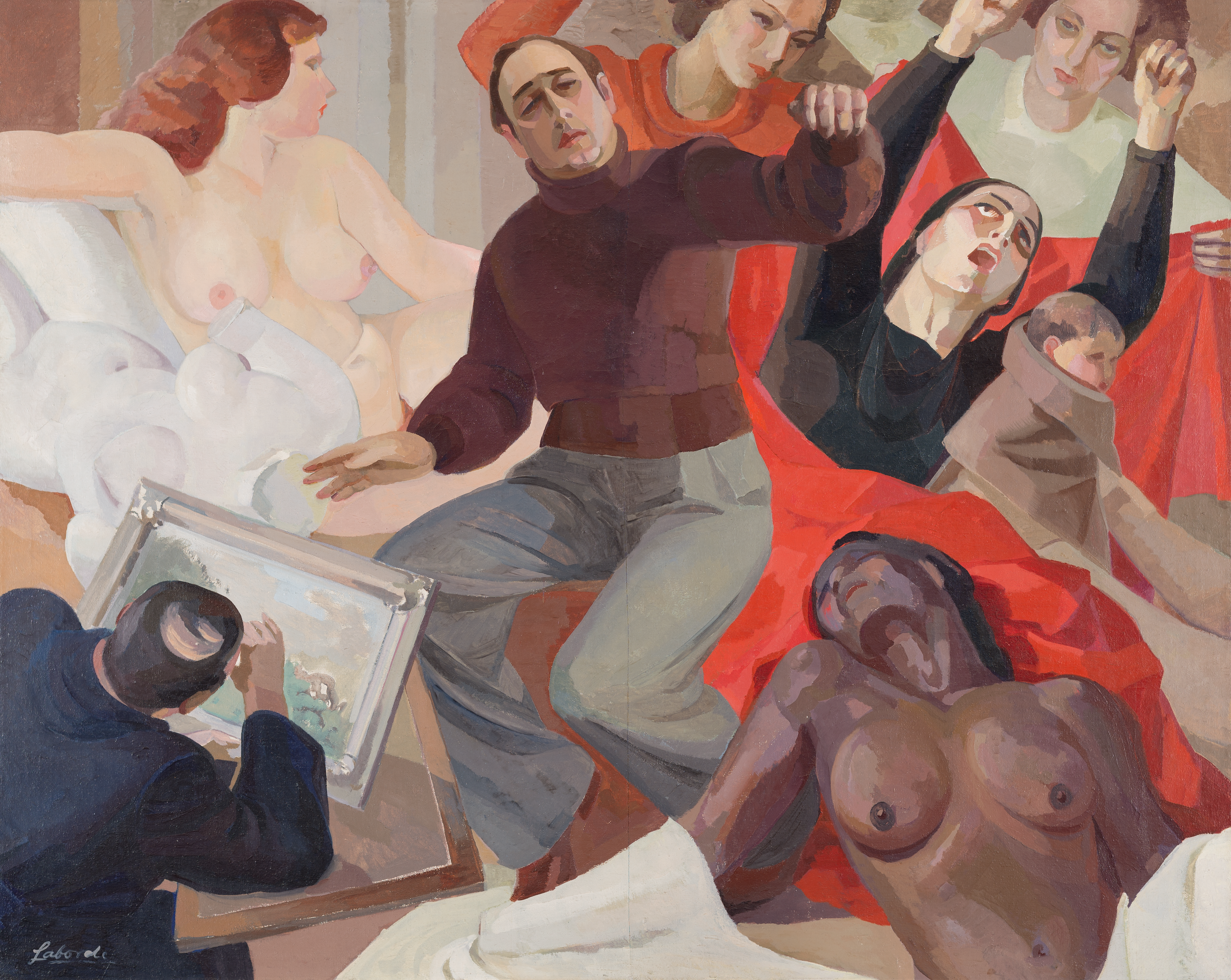
Self portrait

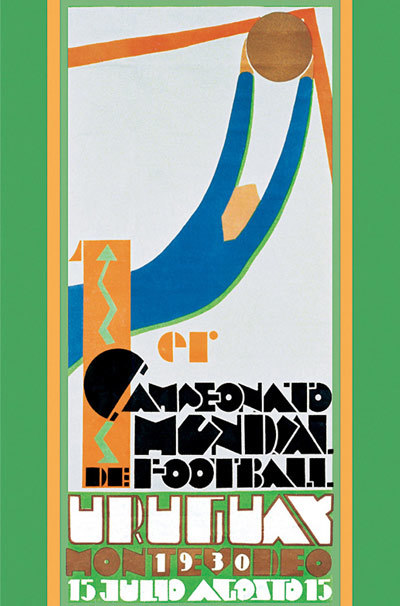
FIFA World Cup poster
