= María Carmen Portela =

Argentine engraver and sculptor

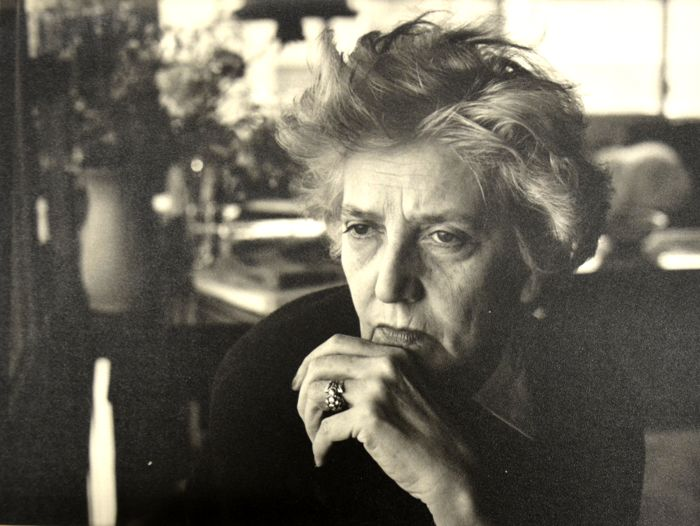
- María Carmen Portela by Annemarie Heinrich, 1962.
- Born: October 6, 1898; Buenos Aires, Argentina
- Died: 1983 (aged 84–85)
- Education: Academia Nacional de Bellas Artes
- Known for: engraver; sculptor
- Style: engraving: drypoint technique; sculpture: portraits

María Carmen Portela (Buenos Aires, October 6, 1898 - 1983) was an Argentine engraver and sculptor who settled in Montevideo, Uruguay, in 1944, and became a legal citizen.

== Biography ==
Portela learned sculpture as a self-taught artist and in 1929, she began to work under the direction of Agustín Riganelli. Later, she studied engraving with Alfredo Guido at the Academia Nacional de Bellas Artes in Buenos Aires.

In 1939, Portela received a scholarship to study sculpture and engraving in Europe from the National Commission of Culture, which she was unable to use because of World War II. In 1944, she settled in Uruguay, where she obtained legal citizenship. She was married to the Uruguayan pedagogue and writer Jesualdo Sosa. In engraving, she specialized in the drypoint technique, while in sculpture, her portraits stood out. She was a teacher of plastic artists; Carmen Garayalde was a student.

Portela'a sculptural works can be found in public squares in Argentina and Uruguay, as well as in the National and Provincial Museum of Fine Arts (Buenos Aires), National and Municipal Museum of Fine Arts (Montevideo), as well as Argentinean provincial museums in Cordoba, Catamarca, Mendoza, and La Plata among others. Her works can also be found in the National Museum of the Czech Republic in Prague, the National Museum of Art of Romania in Bucharest, and the National Art Museum of China in Beijing, among other places.
