= Salvador Sánchez Barbudo =

Spanish painter (1857–1917)

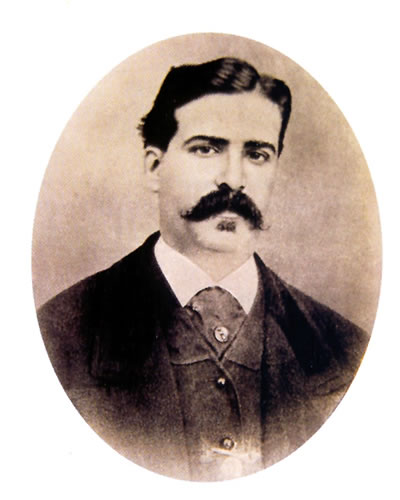
Salvador Sánchez Barbudo

Salvador Sánchez Barbudo (March 14, 1857 – November 28, 1917) was a Spanish painter, active mainly in Rome, Italy.

== Biography ==
He was born in Jerez de la Frontera, Province of Cádiz, Spain. He had his first training in his native Spain in Seville and Madrid. He then moved to Rome under the sponsorship of D. José Juan Fernández de Villavicencio, Marqués del Castrillo. There he met and worked under the painter José Villegas Cordero, and joined a community of Spanish painters including Vincente Poveda.

He painted mainly historical or period paintings, including a scene from the last act of Hamlet. This painting won a prize at the Exposition of Fine Arts of Madrid in 1886. He also painted Modern Life, To the Cafè, Il Suonatore di ghironda, Sala d' armi; La Puerpera; The Venetian Senator; Over the Lagoon; Venetian Costume of the 15th century (watercolor). He died in Rome on November 28, 1917.

== Selected paintings ==
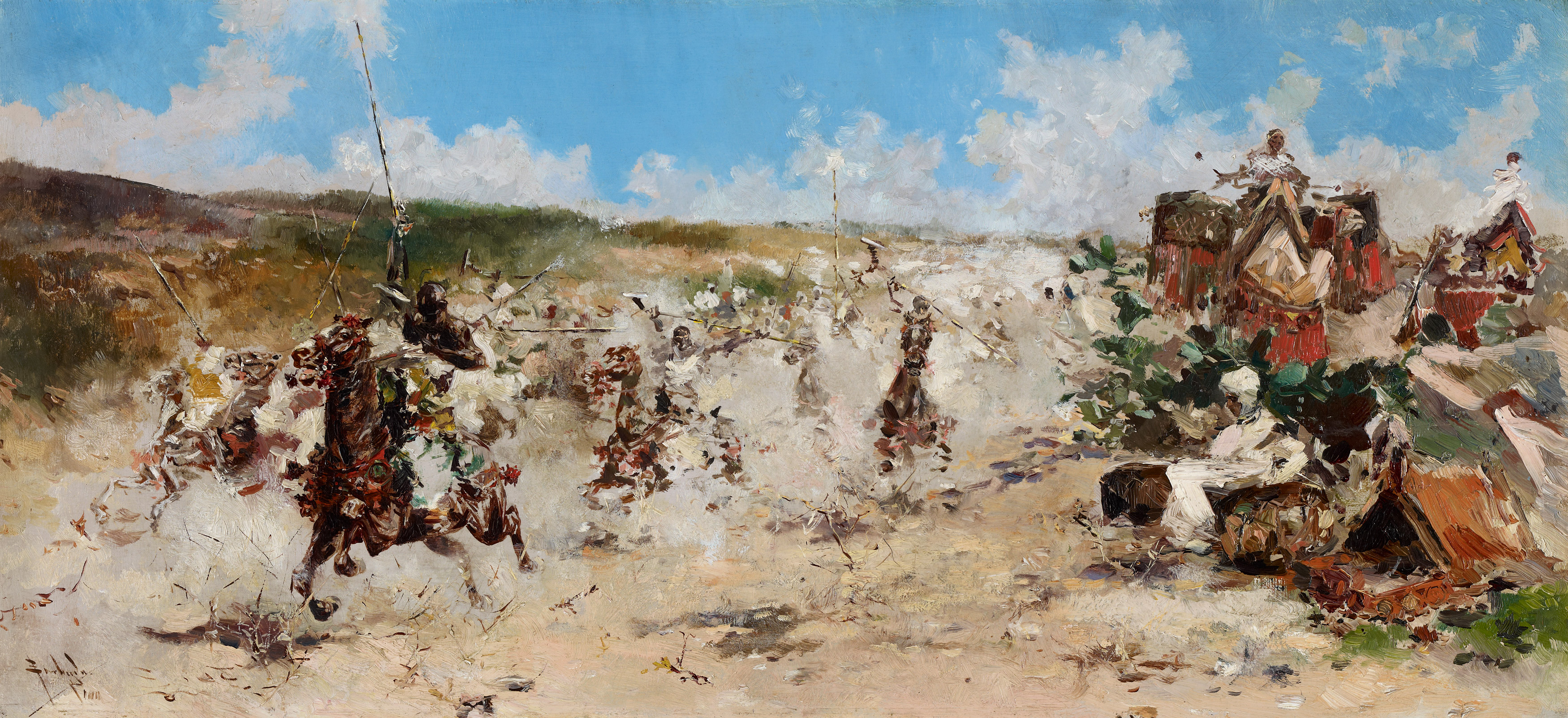
The Game of Gunpowder

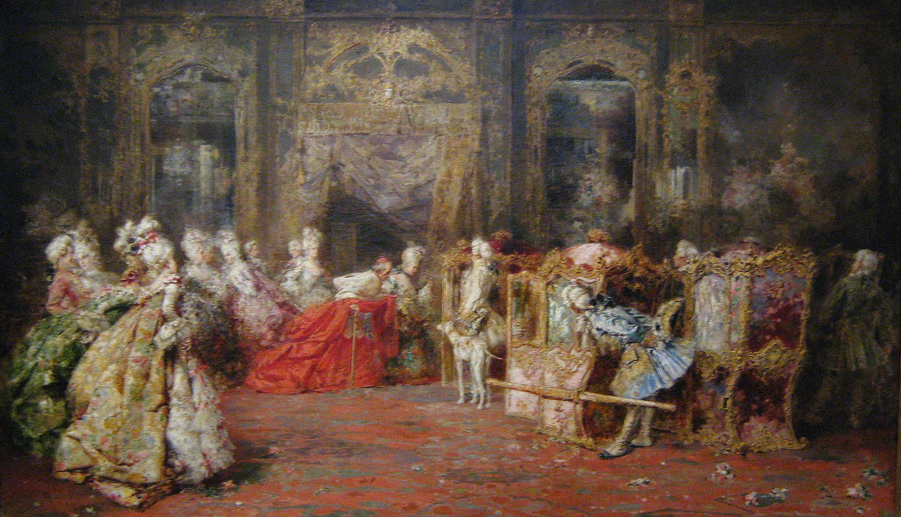
Reception for a Cardinal

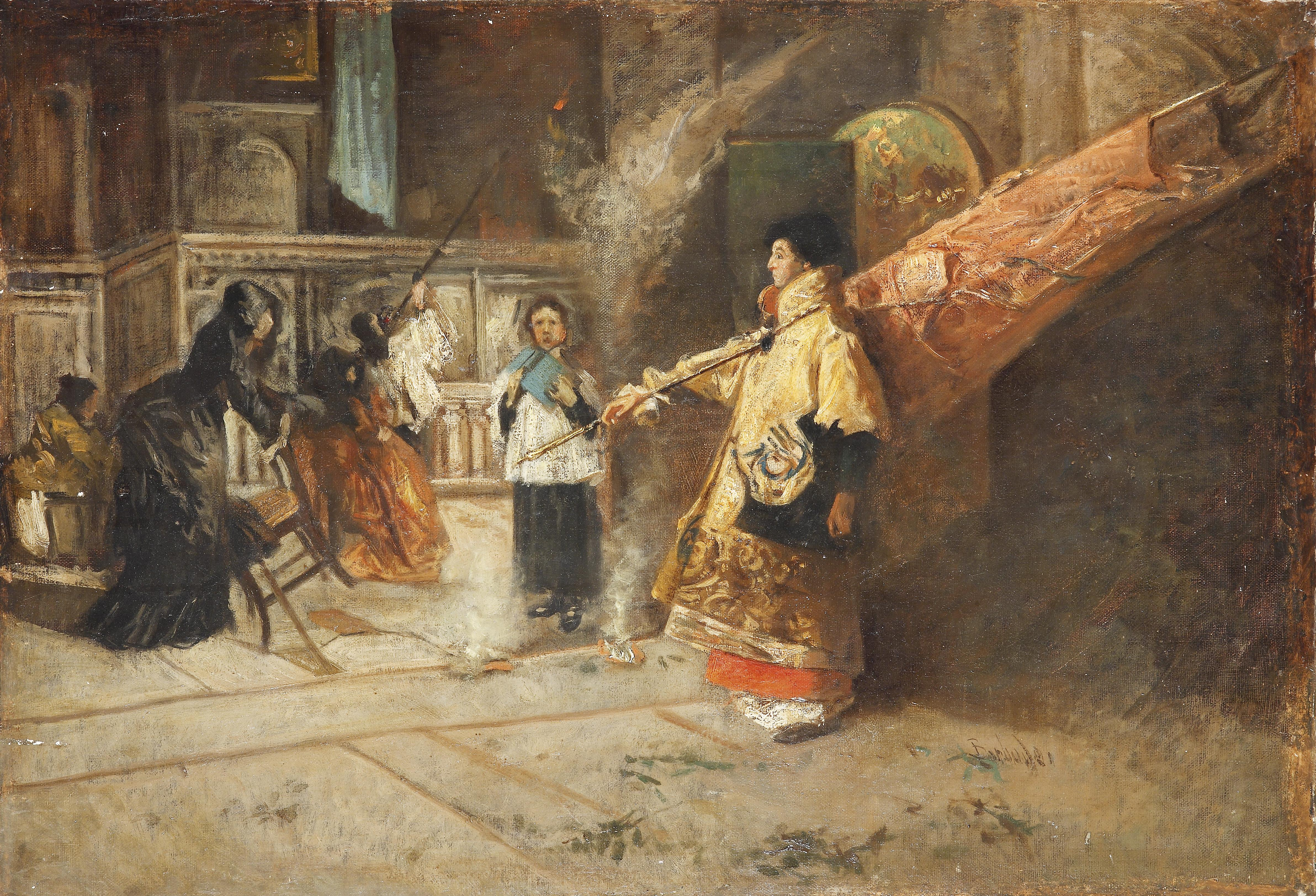
A Young Banner Carrier
in the Sacristy
