= Costigliole =

Costigliole may refer to 2 Italian municipalities in Piedmont:

- Costigliole d'Asti, in the Province of Asti
- Costigliole Saluzzo, in the Province of Cuneo
