= Diego de los Campos =

Uruguayan-born multidisciplinary artist

Diego de los Campos is a multidisciplinary artist, born in Montevideo, Uruguay in 1971. His art practice includes video work, animation, coding, sound art and kinetic installations. The artist has been selected for the PIPA Prize for Brazilian arts and the Rumos Itaú Cultural 2020-2021 Award.
