= Rosa Acle =

Brazilian-born Uruguayan painter

- Born: Rosa; 1 January 1916; Rio de Janeiro
- Died: 11 June 1990 (aged 74)
- Citizenship: Brazil Uruguay
- Occupation: Artist Teacher Painter
- Known for: Yoga instructor Painter

Rosa Acle (January 1, 1919 – June 11, 1990) was a Brazilian-born Uruguayan painter and yoga instructor.

== Early life ==
Acle was born in Rio de Janeiro, Brazil to a Brazilian father of Lebanese origin and a Lebanese mother. Shortly after her birth, her parents settled in Montevideo, Uruguay. Her father, Tufic Acle, was a businessman.

== Career ==
=== Early Constructivism ===
Rosa Acle took lessons from constructivist painter Joaquín Torres-García in 1934 and 1935.

Encouraged by her literary professor, the poet and writer Esther de Cáceres, Acle joined the Asociación de Arte Constructivo (AAC) in 1935; the AAC is dedicated to the promulgation of universal and indigenous constructivism.

In 1936, Cercle et Carré ("The Circle and the Square") began reviewing her work. The article written was entitled "A Profession of Faith".

In 1938, she illustrated the book Voces de Oriente, a collection of Arabic literature translated by Leila Neffa.

In 1939, her first individual exhibition took place at Amigos del Arte in Montevideo. Torres-García wrote a prologue for the catalog entitled "Rosa Acle y Constructivismo". There he stressed that she was a promoter of constructivism and asserted that her paintings reminded him of "Persian and ancient Chaldean art." Stating that, "this feature that undoubtedly is of ancestral origin; a certain orientalism that approaches us to the ancient Persian art or to the warming of Ur or another related current in the ancient art, and that Rosa Acle gives with the most free and natural spontaneity." Torres-García's words testify to Rosa Acle's precocity and the "astonishment" that caused "her rapid assimilation and understanding of the doctrine, as well as the rules derived from it".

=== Europe and Australia ===
Acle was removed from the AAC and left for Paris with letters of introduction to Torres-García's old friends Julio Gonzalez, Wassily Kandinsky, Jacques Lipchitz, and Pablo Picasso. This was also the time that she became involved with a group of Hindus discovering Hatha Yoga, a practice she pursued for the rest of her life.

In that same year, Rosa Acle visited Italy, Switzerland, Egypt, and Java before arriving in Australia just as World War II broke out. For eight years she would reside in Australia. She settled in Melbourne, painting intensely and corresponding with Torres-García. She married and had two sons. This marked a shift in her career as she began to prioritize motherhood.

In a letter to Lipchitz, with whom she continued to correspond, she confided: "seeking to be a good wife and mother, I relegated all my aesthetic concerns to my subconscious. In the love for my husband, I looked for succor and meaning to the moral and religious preoccupations that always tortured me."

She returned to Montevideo in 1947, having left all of her Australian work behind. The majority of her early AAC paintings, drawings, and sculptures that had been left in Montevideo had been discarded and lost. Very few pieces of her earlier works remain. Although she visited her former teacher, Joaquin Torres-García, and continued to work in Constructivist style for many years, Acle never joined his famous workshop, El Taller.

=== Later career ===
After her divorce and the death of her old teacher, Torres-García, Acle resumed painting. From 1950, her work was characterized by an imaginary element of classical iconography, Hindu philosophy, oriental decoration and Torresgarcian constructivism converged. She became a member of the Rosicrucian Fellowship, attracted by the mystical aspect, which emerges in many of her paintings. Already installed in Montevideo and facing economic pressures, she devoted herself to teaching yoga for 30 years. Acle's work incorporates classical, religious, and indigenous iconography into complex, highly structured architectural compositions. Her work has never been widely exhibited, but it is highly regarded.

In 1956, she married again and had a daughter.
