= Carlos María Herrera =

Uruguayan painter (1875–1914)

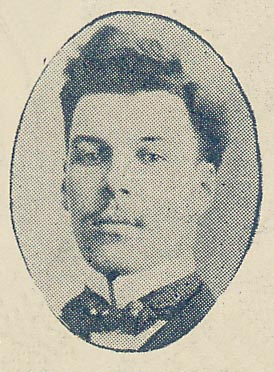
- Herrera circa 1900
- Born: Carlos María Herrera; December 18, 1875; Montevideo, Uruguay
- Died: September 27, 1914 (aged 38); Montevideo, Uruguay
- Education: Círculo Estímulo de Bellas Artes, Rome, Spain
- Known for: Portraits, Nativismo, Historical Painting
- Notable work: Congreso de Abril de 1813; Artigas en el Hervidero (on the reverse of the $1000 note)
- Style: Realism, Nativismo

Carlos María Herrera (December 18, 1875 – September 27, 1914) was a Uruguayan painter.

== Biography ==
Born in Montevideo, Uruguay, Herrera began his studies there under the instruction of the Italian painter, Pedro Queirolo, later relocating to Buenos Aires for two years at the Círculo Estímulo de Bellas Artes. In 1897 he traveled for the first time to Europe, studying in Rome with the Spaniards Salvador Sánchez Barbudo and Mariano Barbasán. He continued his studies in Spain with Joaquín Sorolla y Bastida. In 1902 he took his second and final trip to Europe.

As a specialist in portraits, Herrera was popular among the high society of Montevideo. His portraits of women and children display his mastery of pastel, his favored medium.

He also delved, like many of his contemporaries, into the genre of nativismo, painting scenes of gauchos and criollos. He also painted in the historical genre, his most popular works in this genre being Congreso de Abril de 1813 and Artigas en el Hervidero, which appears on the reverse of the $1000 note.

Some of his portraits are in permanent display in the National Museum of Visual Arts in Montevideo.

== Selected paintings ==
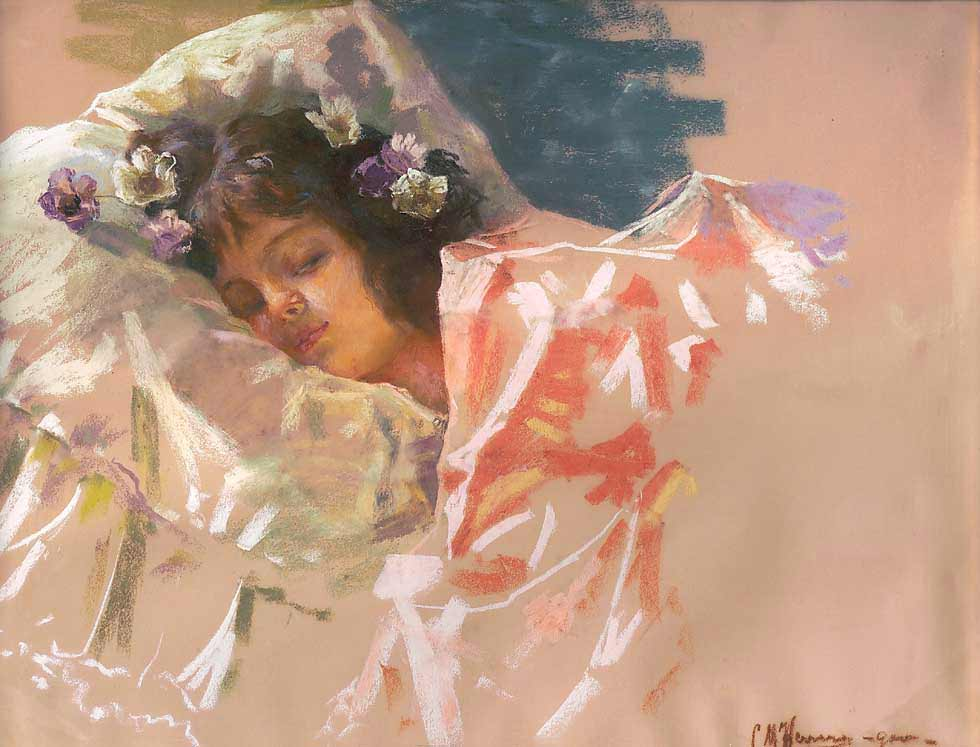
Resting

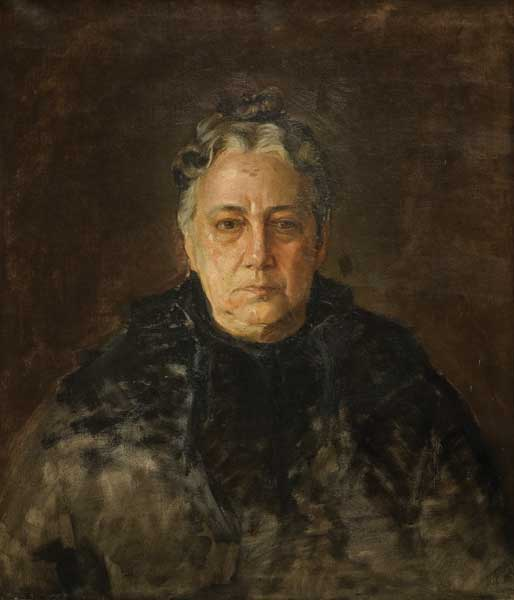
Portrait of his Mother

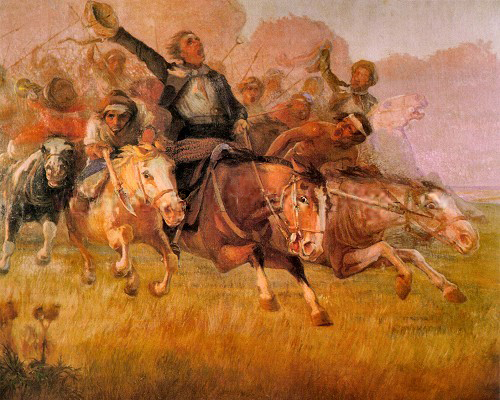
The Cry of Asencio

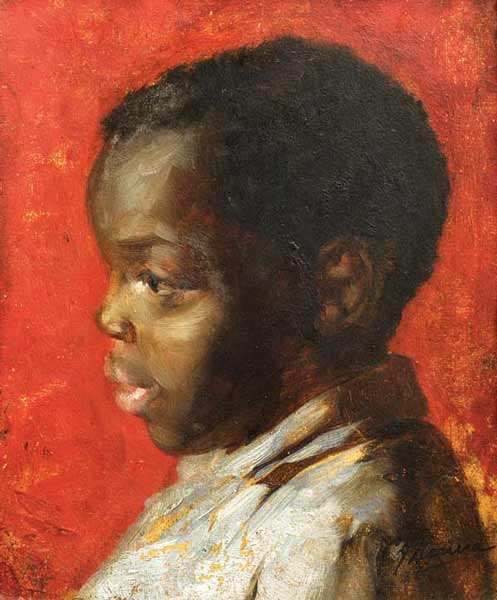
Child
