= Carmelo de Arzadun =

Uruguayan painter

- Born: July 16, 1888; Salto, Uruguay
- Died: 1968
- Education: Académie de la Grande Chaumière, Académie Colarossi, Académie Vitti
- Known for: Painting
- Style: Constructivism
- Awards: Gold Medal, Ibero-American Exhibition (1930), 1st Prize, II National Hall (1938), 1st Prize, IV National Hall (1940), Grand Prize, V National Hall (1941)

Carmelo de Arzadun (1888–1968) was an Uruguayan painter.

== Early life ==
Carmelo was born in Salto on July 16, 1888. He initially studied art in Salto, and later in Spain alongside the artist Antonio Aramburu. Later, Carmelo won a scholarship with which he travelled to Paris to study at the Académie de la Grande Chaumière and Académie Colarossi, and then at the Académie Vitti, where Kees van Dongen and Hermenegildo Anglada Camarasa were teachers. Two other official scholarships lead him again to study abroad in following years. In 1935 he attended classes at the Torres García Workshop and joined the Constructive Art Association.

== Awards and later life ==
Carmelo represented Uruguay in multiple exhibitions abroad, notably including the Iberoamerican exhibition in Seville (gold medal, 1930), Uruguayan artists (Buenos Aires, 1915), Autumn salons (Paris, 1926 and 1927), La Maison de l' Unesco (Paris 1949) From Blanes to our days (Ecuador, 1955) In Uruguay he participated in multiple exhibitions, competitions, salons, being the winner of the 1st Prize in the II National Hall in 1938, of the 1st Prize in the IV Hall in 1940 and of the Grand Prize of the V Hall in 1941. He was also awarded in the Municipal Halls.

Arzadun's work is represented in the National Museum of Visual Arts, the Municipal Museum "Juan Manuel Blanes", the National Museum of Fine Arts of Buenos Aires, the Watson Collection of New York, and in European Museums spanning across France, Belgium, Italy. He died in 1968.

== See also ==
National Museum of Visual Arts (Uruguay)
