= José Luis Zorrilla de San Martín =

Uruguayan sculptor (1891–1975)

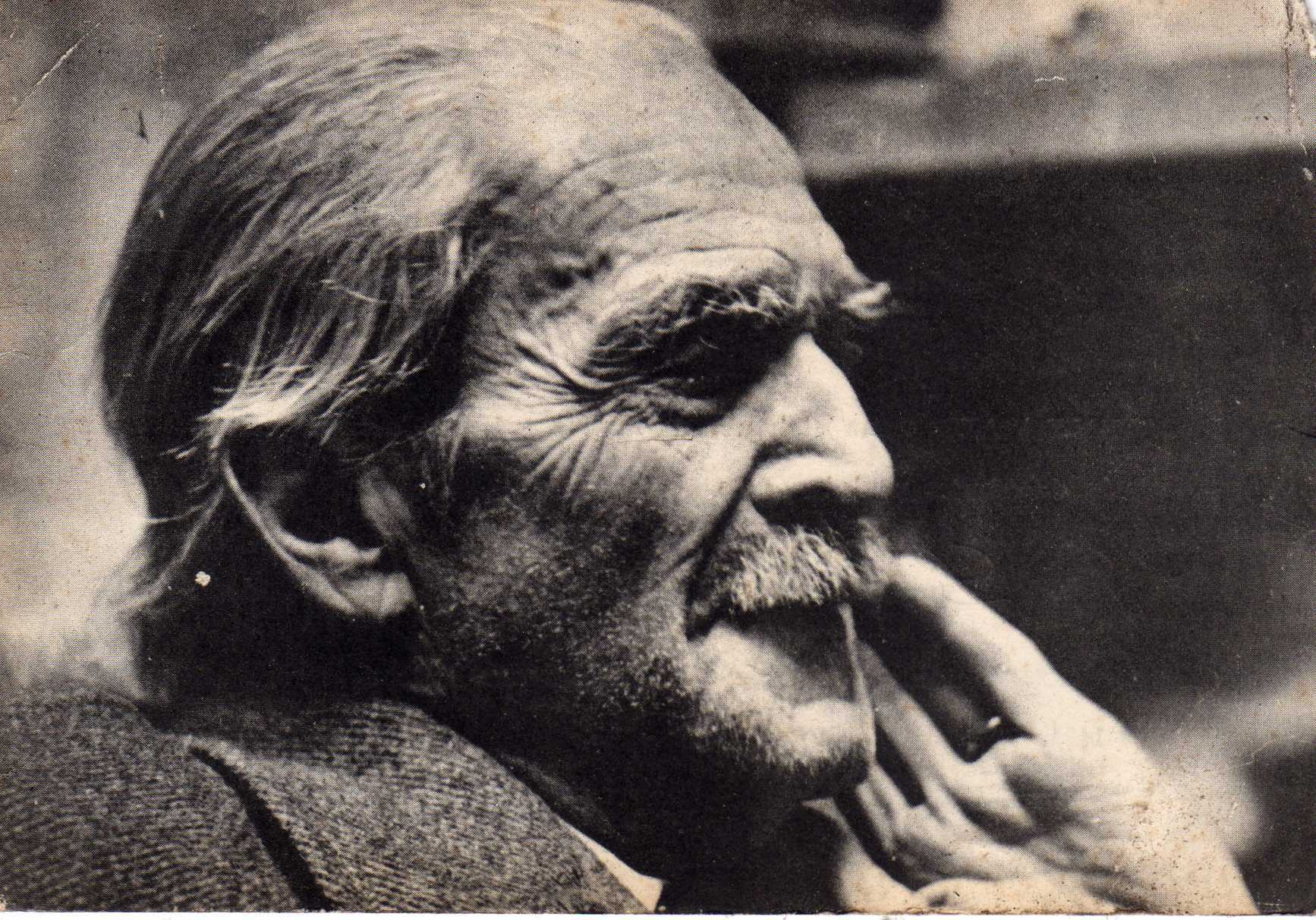
- Born: José Luis Zorrilla de San Martín; September 5, 1891; Madrid, Spain
- Died: May 24, 1975 (aged 83); Montevideo, Uruguay
- Education: Círculo de Bellas Artes, Paris workshops of Antoine Bourdelle
- Known for: Sculpture, Painting
- Notable work: Monument to José Artigas (Washington, D.C.), Obelisk of Montevideo,Monument to Juan Zorrilla de San Martín,Monument to Julio Roca, Fountain of the Athletes
- Style: Baroque, Modern Sculpture
- Spouse: Guma Muñoz del Campo
- Children: Inés Zorrilla, China Zorrilla
- Father: Juan Zorrilla de San Martín
- Awards: Commendatore of Italy (1966)
- Memorials: Museo Zorrilla in Montevide, Monuments in Uruguay, Argentina, Italy, and the United States

José Luis Zorrilla de San Martín (5 September 1891 – 24 May 1975) was a Uruguayan sculptor and painter. One of the pivotal sculptors from Uruguay, his most significant impact was through the monuments he created in the capital city of Montevideo. His style displayed elements of aesthetic baroque incorporated with modern sculpture.

== Biography ==
=== Early life ===
Born in Madrid in 1891, he was the son of the writer Juan Zorrilla de San Martín, who served in the court of Alfonso XIII as Ambassador of Uruguay. For three years he moved to Paris, where he met Carlos Federico Sáez and would prove a strong influence in his interest and artistic style later.

He settled in Montevideo in 1898. His first oil painting portraits dating from 1906 show a great influence from Sáez. He studied at the Círculo de Bellas Artes with painter Vicente Puig, and later received lessons from the sculptor Philip Menini (1909). Between 1911 and 1914, his work was first exhibited.

=== Life in Europe ===
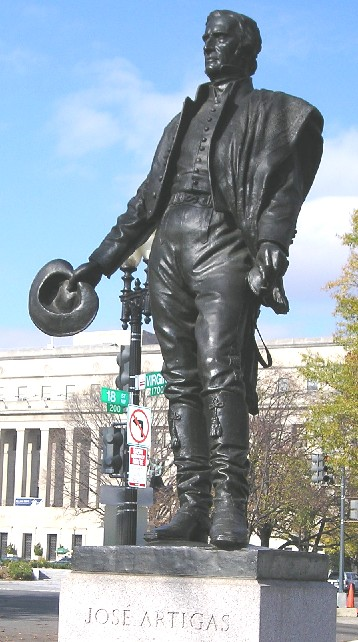
Monument to Uruguayan founding father José Artigas in Washington, DC (1948).

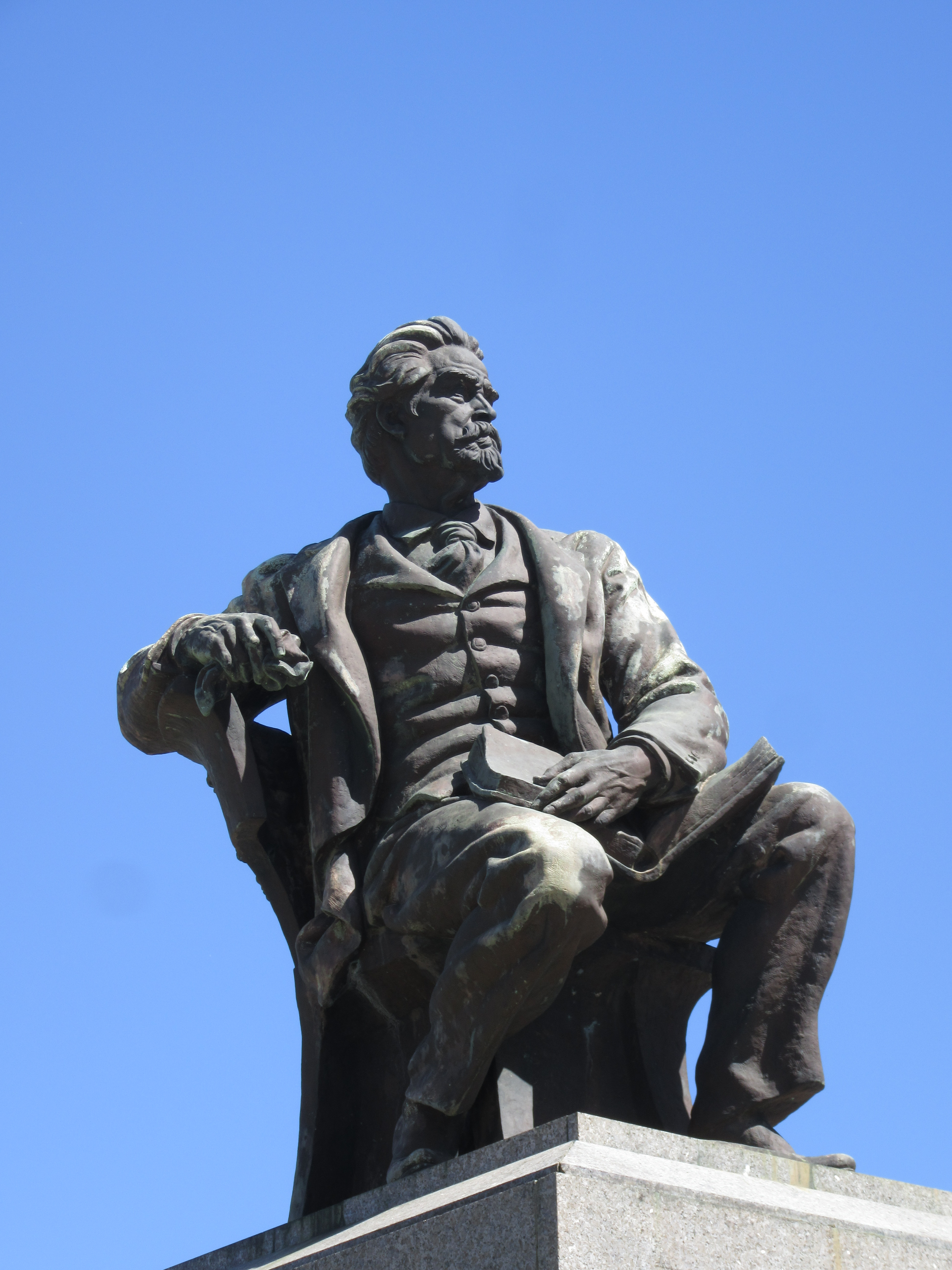
Monument in Montevideo to Uruguayan writer Juan Zorrilla de San Martín, the sculptor's father (1975).

After receiving a scholarship from the Uruguayan government in 1914 to study in Munich, he had to stay in Florence due to the outbreak of World War I. He returned to Uruguay the following year and entered the Legislative Palace as an assistant sculptor.

He won the International Competition to erect the monument Andalusia Gaucho (1922) and already married to Guma Muñoz del Campo, moved with their two daughters (Inés and China (born Concepción)) to Paris soon after, where he set up a workshop and studied under the sculptor Antoine Bourdelle.

The monument should be based in Brussels, as the best casting workshop of the French capital was occupied in the works of Antoine Bourdelle, who later would be linked as a disciple and friend. That same year, he made "Old vizcacha" and the statue of José Gervasio Artigas in Asunción, Paraguay.

From that time is "Saint Joseph and Child", aimed at a church in the island of Saint Louis. Parallel attended workshops Maillol, Despiau and Drivier. He unveiled the Fountain of the Athletes in 1925 at the Salon d'Automne, which received the silver medal; the work is now located in Rodó Park, Montevideo.

=== Return to Uruguay ===
In 1925 he returned to Uruguay and the following year the monument was inaugurated. Work of years: a monument to the Battle of Sarandi (1930), decoration of the chapel of the Prison for Women (1930), equestrian statue of the Grito de Asencio (1936) and the Obelisk of Montevideo (Obelisco a los Constituyentes de 1830) (1936, sparkling granite 41 meters high with three allegorical bronze installed in the Parque José Batlle y Ordóñez de Montevideo).

He won the international competition for the equestrian monument to Argentine General Julio Roca (1937) and opened a workshop in Buenos Aires for its completion.

That year the Bishop of recumbent monuments Mariano Soler, First Archbishop of Montevideo, located in the Cathedral of that city. He was invited to attend the Paris Exposition of 1937 and declared a "guest of honor." He was, in turn, invited in 1940 to travel to the United States by President Franklin D. Roosevelt.

Between 1940 and 1961, Zorrilla was the Director of the National Museum of Visual Arts in Montevideo. He created a monument to Artigas in 1947 to be placed in the Banco de la República Oriental del Uruguay (unveiled in 1949). The Monument to Artigas, commissioned by the government of Argentina, was made in 1960, but its unveiling in Recoleta, Buenos Aires, was delayed until 1971.

He completed a monument to Artigas in Rome, and following its unveiling in 1966, was awarded the title of Commendatore by the government of Italy. Another statue, El Viejo Pancho, located in the Plaza de la Libertad de Montevideo street, dates from 1969.

Following lengthy proceedings, on 24 September 1997, the Uruguayan Ambassador Julio Pombo and New York City Mayor Rudolph Giuliani unveiled a monument to General Artigas, located in SoHo, Manhattan, between Avenue of the Americas and Spring Street. Among the personalities that attended this inauguration, the Uruguayan ambassador, Foreign Affairs minister Álvaro Ramos; the President of the Inter-American Development Bank, Enrique V. Iglesias; and NY City Parks Department Director, Henry Stern. His workshop in Punta Carretas is a museum next to the Museo Zorrilla.

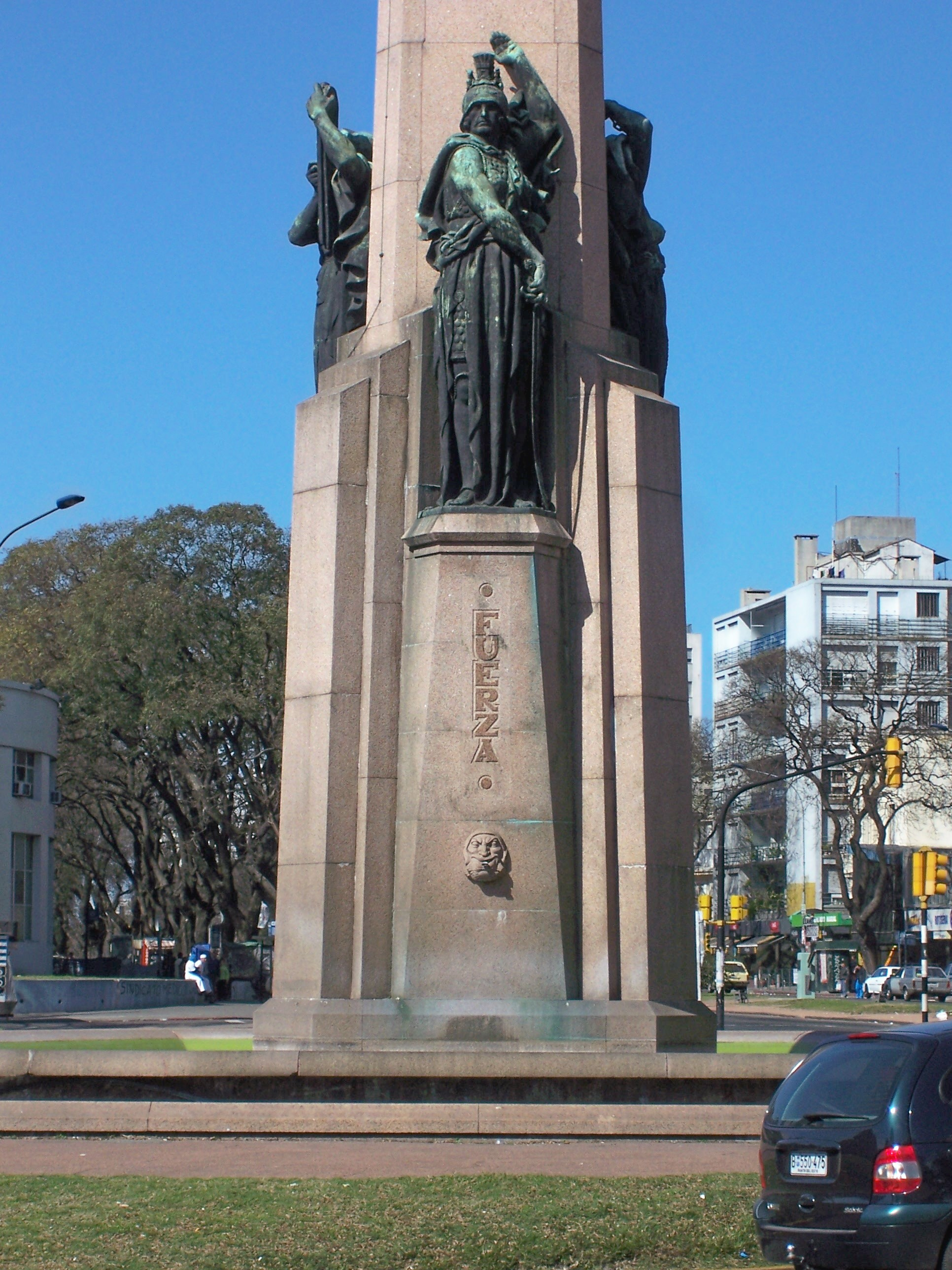
Monument to the Constitution of 1830, Montevideo

== Death ==
Zorrilla died in Montevideo at 84 years of age.
