= José Cuneo Perinetti =

Uruguayan painter

José Cuneo Perinetti (September 11, 1887 - July 19, 1977) was an Uruguayan painter.
