= National Museum of Visual Arts (Uruguay) =

Coordinates: 34°54′50″S 56°09′53″W

Museo Nacional de Artes Visuales National Museum of Visual Arts
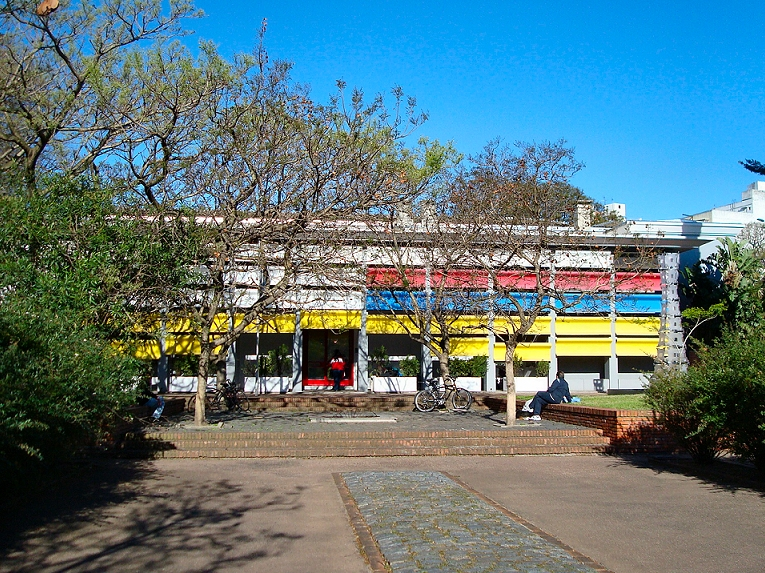
- Established: December 10, 1911
- Location: Julio Herrera y Reissig esq. Tomás Giribaldi, s/n, CP: 11300; Parque Rodó, Montevideo (Uruguay)
- Director: Enrique Aguerre
- Website: www.mnav.gub.uy

National Museum of Visual Arts (Uruguay) (Spanish: Museo Nacional de Artes Visuales) a museum in Parque Rodó, Montevideo, Uruguay. It was inaugurated on December 10, 1911.

This museum has the largest collection of Uruguayan artworks. Among them are works by Olga Piria, Rafael Barradas, Joaquín Torres García, José Cúneo, Carlos Federico Sáez, Pedro Figari, Juan Manuel Blanes and artist Pablo Serrano who lived in Montevideo for twenty years.

The museum also hosts temporary shows, in many cases foreign artists' itinerant exhibitions.

== Exhibitions ==
- 1, ground floor. surface: 152 m^{2}
- 2, ground floor. Area: 1015 m^{2}
- 3, first floor. Surface: 110 m^{2}
- 4, first floor. Surface: 634 m^{2}
- 5, room, upstairs. Surface: 570 m^{2}
- Conference Room, ground floor, with a capacity of 174 seats. Primarily designed for video conferences.
- Library, upstairs. Monday to Friday from 11 to 17 hours, focused on art, with more than 8,000 volumes.
- Garden, designed by landscape architect Leandro Silva Delgado Uruguay.

== Directors ==
| Name Director | Time |
|---|---|
| Domingo Laporte | (1911–1928) |
| Ernesto Laroche | (1928–1940) |
| José Luis Zorrilla de San Martín | (1940–1961) |
| Muñoz del Campo | (1961–1969) |
| Ángel Kalenberg | (1969–2007) |
| Jacqueline Lacasa | (2007–2009) |
| Mario Sagradini | (2009-2010) |
| Enrique Aguerre | (2010–now) |

== See also ==
- List of museums in Uruguay
