= Wings Award =

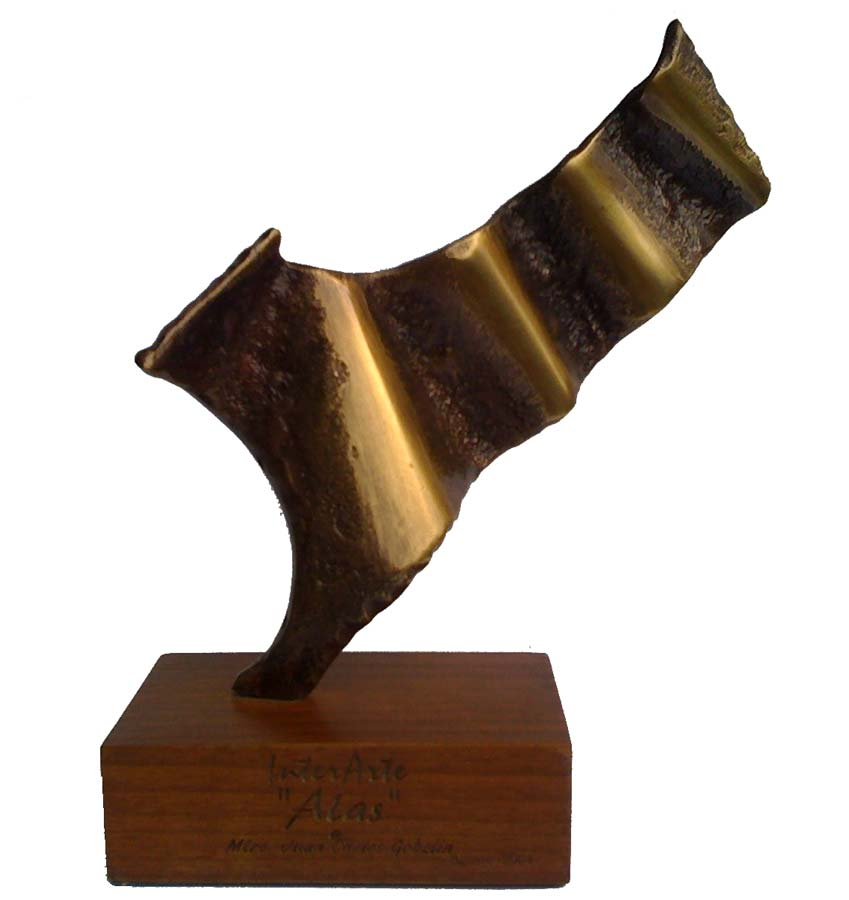
- Native name: Premio Alas
- Awarded for: Uruguayan culture
- Sponsored by: Interarte
- Country: Uruguay
- First award: 2001
- Website: www.interarte.com.uy/alas

The Wings Award (Spanish: Premio Alas), granted in Uruguay by the cultural association Interarte, are annual honors that recognize the career and contribution to Uruguayan culture of artists – creators or performers – and cultural journalists.

They were established in 2001 at the initiative of Juan Carlos Gebelin, founder and then-president of Interarte. Four prizes are given each year, alternating among the following disciplines: music, visual arts, theater, film, dance, literature, photography, set and costume design for performances, and cultural journalism.

Nominations can be submitted by any Interarte member. The board of directors selects the honorees from this list. In exceptional cases, Wings of Honor are awarded to outstanding individuals or institutions – Uruguayan or foreign – that work to promote Uruguayan culture. The bronze and fine wood statuette was designed by the visual artist Ana María Poggi.

The first awards ceremony took place on 15 August 2001, and, as a tribute to Uruguayan women, the awardees were journalist Mónica Bottero, visual artist Águeda Dicancro, pianist Nibya Mariño, and actress Estela Medina.

== Awardees ==
- 2001: Mónica Bottero, Águeda Dicancro, Nibya Mariño, Estela Medina
- 2002: Celia Roca, Susana Gutman, Beatriz Flores Silva, Antonio Larreta, Ramón Mérica
- 2003: Arotxa, Enrique Mrak, Panchito Nolé, Eduardo Ramirez
- 2004: Manuel Martínez Carril, Hugo Nantes, Omar Varela, Juan Carlos Gebelin
- 2006: Mario Benedetti, Federico García Vigil, Octavio Podestá, Milton Schinca
- 2007: Roxana Blanco, Cristina García Banegas, Marisa Minetti, Natalie Scheck
- 2008: Raquel Boldorini, Hugo Burel, Hebe Rosa, Dahd Sfeir
- 2009: Tito Barbón, Diego Barreiro, Julio Frade, Linda Kohen
- 2010: Ignacio Cardozo, Levon, Enrique Medina, Raquel Pierotti
- 2011: Miguel Ángel Battegazzore, Cristina Morán, Sara Nieto, Héctor Ulises Pasarella. Wings of Honor: Julio Bocca, Enrique Iglesias
- 2012: Graciela Figueroa, Roberto Fontana, Eduardo Gilardoni, Yamandú Marichal. Wings of Honor: Centro Cultural de Música
- 2013: Olga Bergolo, Leo Barizzoni, Beatriz Lockhart, Jorge Bolani
- 2014: Pablo Atchugarry, Carlos Cebro, Jaime Clara, Mario Delgado Aparaín
- 2015: Jorge Ángel Arteaga, Ignacio Iturria, Mauricio Rosencof, Rubén Rada
- 2016: Gustavo Alamón, Rita Contino, Mariel Odera, Federico Veiroj
- 2017: Ariel Britos, Margarita Musto, Ricardo Pascale, María Noel Riccetto
- 2018: Roy Berocay, Ensemble De Profundis, Gloria Demassi, Hugo Millán
- 2019: Hugo Fattoruso, Nelly Antúnez, Rimer Cardillo, Ida Vitale
- 2020: Teresa Porzecanski, Teresa Trujillo, Eduardo Fernández, César Troncoso
- 2021: Fernando Butazzoni, Fernando Cattivelli, Mariana Percovich, Carlos Ventre
- 2022: Olga Banegas, Clever Lara, Jorge Arbeleche, María Dodera. Wings of Honor: José Serebrier
- 2023: Sergio Blanco, Homero Francesch, Nidia Telles, Julio Testoni
- 2024: Eduardo Cardozo, Pablo Casacuberta, Andrea Davidovics, Álvaro Hagopian
- 2025: Maria Inés Camou, Alfredo Ghierra, Myriam Gleijer, Enrique Graf
