= Margarita Musto =

- Born: 16 November 1955 (age 70); Montevideo, Uruguay
- Education: Margarita Xirgu Multidisciplinary School of Dramatic Art
- Occupations: Actress, theater director, translator, teacher
- Spouse: Héctor Manuel Vidal
- Children: María Vidal Musto
- Awards: Florencio Award (2001, 2011); Fraternity Award (2004)

Margarita Musto (born 16 November 1955) is a Uruguayan actress, theater director, translator, teacher, and general and artistic director of the Comedia Nacional.

== Biography ==
Margarita Musto graduated in 1982 from the Margarita Xirgu Multidisciplinary School of Dramatic Art (EMAD). She has worked under directors such as Carlos Aguilera, Jorge Curi, Mario Morgan, Omar Varela, China Zorrilla, David Hammond, and Valentin Tepliakov. She participated in works by classic authors such as Chekhov, Shakespeare, and Federico García Lorca.

She worked on the television series Los Tres. In cinema, she played the leading role in La historia casi verdadera de Pepita la Pistolera, under the direction of Beatriz Flores Silva. For this role she received awards at the Guadalajara International Film Festival and the 12th Cinematographic Festival of Uruguay. In 2008, Flores Silva directed her again in Polvo nuestro que estás en los cielos. She has participated in other films such as Retrato de mujer con hombre al fondo (1997) by Manane Rodríguez, and La memoria de Blas Quadra (2002) and Estrella del sur (2002) by Luis Nieto.

As a theater actress, one of Musto's most relevant works was Breaking the Code by Hugh Whitemore, about the life of Alan Turing. Directed by Héctor Manuel Vidal, the play ran for four years and more than 300 showings, as of 1994. Other important interpretations in her career were El método Grönholm, Una relación pornográfica, Frozen, Sonata de otoño (directed by Omar Varela), Madre Coraje, Closer, and An Inspector Calls (for China Zorrilla).

Her play En honor al mérito, based on the investigation of the murder of Zelmar Michelini, and in which she also acted, was released in 2000 at Teatro El Galpón. Thanks to this work, she won the 2001 Florencio Award in the best national author text category, and the first dramaturgy prize of the IMM. In 2011 she again received the Florencio for best direction and the best theatrical show of the season for Blackbird by Scottish dramatist David Harrower. Another of her successes as a director was Top Girls by the English playwright Caryl Churchill.

Muasto has translated plays from French and English into Spanish. She teaches at EMAD and the Film School of Uruguay, as well as holding acting workshops. From 2 January 2013 to 2016, she served as director general and artistic director of the Comedia Nacional, being the first woman to hold that position.

In 2004 the Uruguayan branch of B'nai B'rith presented her with the Fraternity Award for her theatrical career.

She was the wife of theater director Héctor Manuel Vidal, who died in 2014. Her daughter María Vidal Musto is a theater actress.

== Filmography ==
- La historia casi verdadera de Pepita la Pistolera (1993)
- Retrato de mujer con hombre al fondo (1997)
- La memoria de Blas Quadra (2000)
- Estrella del sur (2002)
- Polvo nuestro que estás en los cielos (2008)
- ¿Cómo te clasifico? (short, 2011)
- Breadcrumbs (2016)
