= Mariana Percovich =

Uruguayan playwright, teacher, and theater director

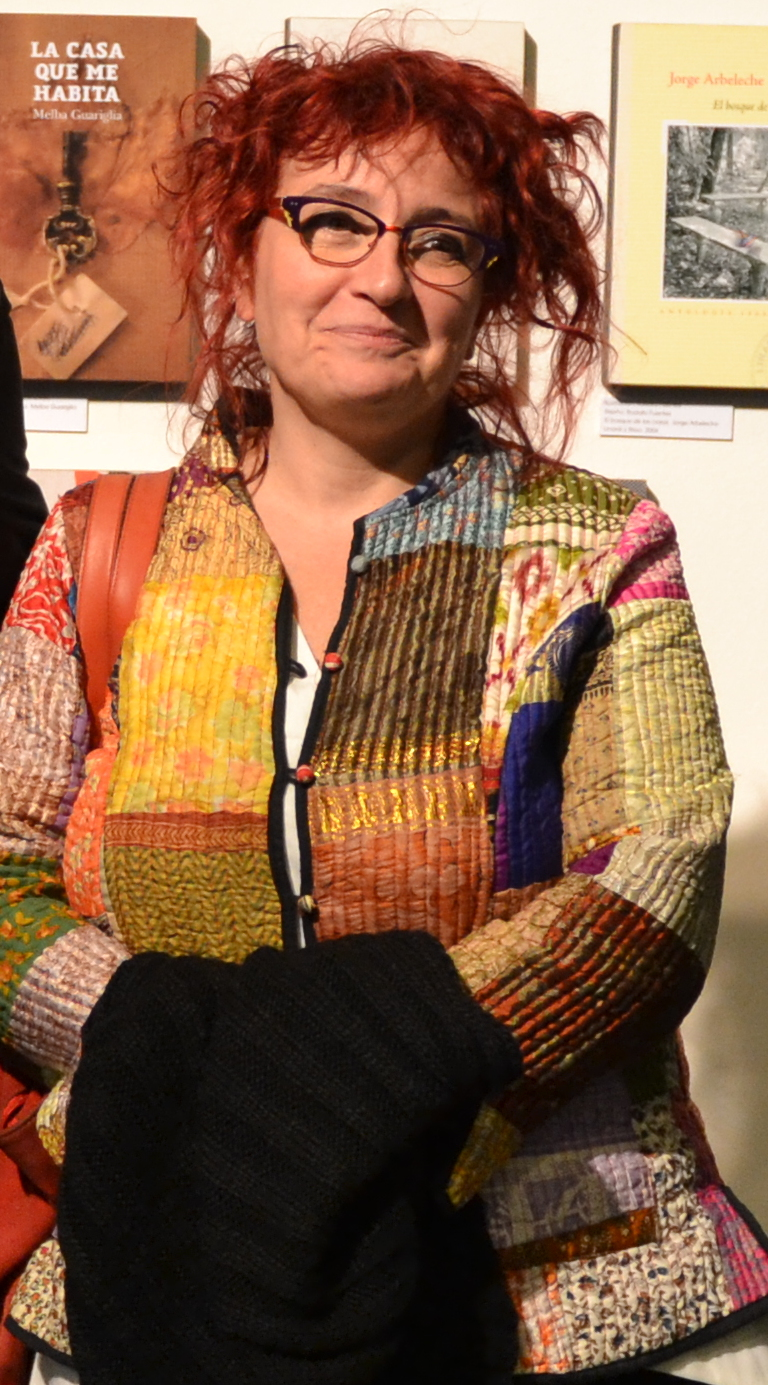
- Mariana Percovich in 2016
- Born: 1 December 1963 (age 62); Montevideo, Uruguay
- Education: Instituto de Profesores Artigas
- Occupations: Playwright, teacher, theater director
- Awards: Florencio Award; Silver Morosoli Award
- Website: marianapercovich5.blogspot.com

Mariana Percovich (born 1 December 1963) is a Uruguayan playwright, teacher, and theater director. She graduated as a literature professor from the Instituto de Profesores Artigas (IPA) of Montevideo. Prior to her reintegration into EMAD, she had been the Performing Arts Coordinator of her country's Ministry of Education and Culture, where she spent four years. She has won the Florencio Award twice. She has been part of the company Complot since 2007.

== Career ==
In her childhood, Percovich already liked the theater through the influence of her parents, who helped her to be a "conscious spectator", although she had decided not to be an actress. Before starting her theatrical career, she worked as a cultural journalist in different media, such as at the weekly magazine Búsqueda, where she held the post of editor of the culture section, and also as a literature teacher at different theater schools.

Her first contact with theater direction was due to the support of director Carlos Aguilera, who allowed her to be his assistant on all the rehearsals of his play Ya nadie recuerda a Frederick Chopin in 1982, when she was 19 years old.

Due to the lack of training offers for theater directors, Percovich worked under the tutelage of Carlos Aguilera, as well as directors Héctor Manuel Vidal, Jorge Curi, and Eduardo Schinca, and also her father, who "made us look at architecture. From a very young age, he obligated me to be very observant of my city."

She continued her training in Europe when she received a scholarship to the Royal Court Theatre in London, where she had as tutors Steven Berkoff and Stephen Daldry, among others. She was also at the Théâtre Ouvert in Paris, where she was a resident.

In 2004, she began her first term as director of the Municipal School of Dramatic Arts (EMAD), which lasted until 2007, when she resigned her position due to professional differences with teachers of the school. Later she was Coordinator of Performing Arts of the Ministry of Education and Culture of Uruguay, where she worked under the direction of the poet and essayist Hugo Achugar, National Director of Culture.

In 2007, Percovich joined the company Complot with playwright and theater director Gabriel Calderón, choreographer Martín Inthamoussú, and actor and theater director Ramiro Perdomo. Her first production with the new company was Una lluvia irlandesa, by the Majorcan author Josep Pere-Peyró.

In 2012, she again took up management of EMAD, where her new project was the reformation of the school's curriculum to raise its degrees to the level of licentiate. She remained in the position until 2014.

Since July 2015, she has been the Director of Culture of the Departmental Intendency of Montevideo.

== Style ==
Percovich's direction style has been highlighted by "a scenic investigation of the relationship between the viewer and the space", which has led her to mount her works both in conventional halls and in unusual places, such as public or historical buildings, bars, stables, and train stations.

She expressed this style from her first work, 1995's Te casarás en América, which was presented at the Hungarian Synagogue in Montevideo. Her intention since then has been the search for new languages generated by "the aura and the symbols that emerge from those places" to interact with their infrastructure and give them a new meaning that serves as a challenge for the viewer.

In the 1990s, her style was influenced by a play by Antonio Araujo, who was followed by the public while he performed his work in the corridors and stairs of the abandoned hospital "Umberto Primo" in São Paulo, Brazil. This form of representation was subsequently used in her works Destino de dos cosas o de tres, Juego de damas crueles, El errante de Nod, and Pentesilea.

Percovich was inspired by her colleague Roberto Bartís to define her way of seeing the acting work and thus transmit it to the actors who work with her:

An actor is a gesture thief to the extent that he has to take reality as a model, and he is also part of that reality. But it is very important that he have an opinion. I do not believe in the actor repeating from a text. We no longer bet on "talking heads". An actor is a person with soul, heart, and technique, but also opinion. From the reality that I have as a model, I select what I take. [...] When you go to see a character, in reality you will see So-and-so playing that character. Otherwise, what would be the point of seeing Hamlet again?

— Mariana Percovich, March 2012

== Works directed ==
- Te casarás en América, 1995
- Destino de dos cosas o de tres, 1996
- Juego de damas crueles, 1997
- Extraviada, 1998
- Alicia underground, 1998
- Cenizas en mi corazón, 1999
- Proyecto feria, 2001
- El errante de Nod, 2002
- Yocasta - Una Tragedia, 2003
- Playa desierta, 2007
- For Export del Uruguay, 2008
- Medea del Olimar, 2009
- Chaika, 2009
- Cuartito Azul. Melodrama caleidoscópico y tanguero, 2010
- Pentesilea, 2011
- Clitemnestra, 2012
- Las Descentradas, 2013
- Proyecto Felisberto, 2013
- Algo de Ricardo, 2014
- Mucho de Ofelia, 2015

Juego de damas crueles has been Percovich's most awarded play. For it, she received the Florencio Award twice – one for best show and the other for best director.

Proyecto Feria was a street theatre project created by Percovich in response to an invitation from the Mercosur International Festival of Córdoba, Argentina, which was carried out at the different fairs of the city. For its execution, Percovich chose two models of fair: one of freaks and one conventional. The project represented for her the culmination of a six-year search for the integration of art with the national identity. After its presentation in Córdoba, the project was carried out in Montevideo a year later.

Cenizas en mi corazón, Extraviada, and Yocasta have been published in Uruguay, France, and Argentina in Spanish, English, and French.

In addition to Percovich's presentations in Montevideo, her plays have also been shown in Santiago, Buenos Aires, Córdoba, São Paulo, Curitiba, Barcelona, Madrid, London, and Nuevo León (Mexico), among other cities. As a teacher, she has developed a national and international career in direction and acting.

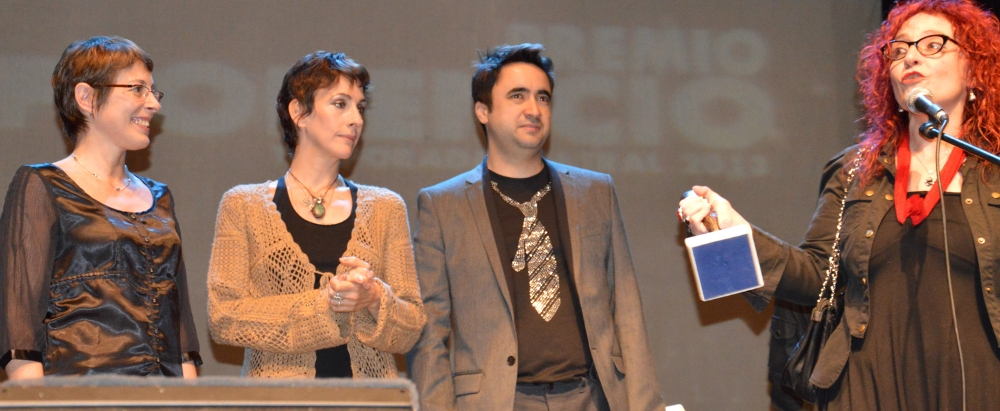
Mariana Percovich (right)

== Awards ==
In addition to the Florencio Award, Percovich has won the International Theatre Institute (ITI) Award for Te casarás en América, the Silver Morosoli Award for Extraviada, as well as the Iris, Molière, MEC, and Gralha Azul awards.
