= Estela Medina =

Uruguan actress

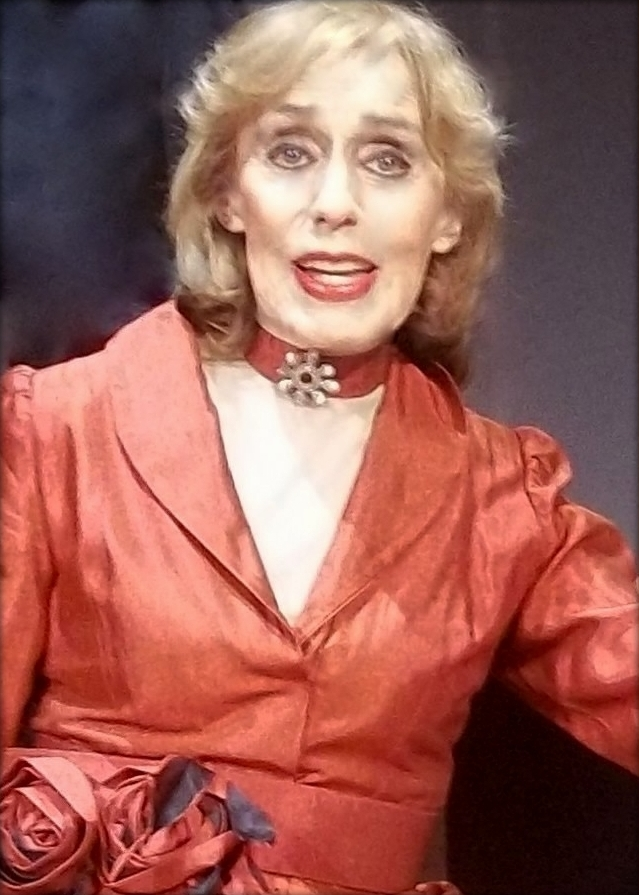
- Estela Medina in 2014
- Born: February 13, 1932 (age 93); Montevideo, Uruguay
- Education: Margarita Xirgu Multidisciplinary School of Dramatic Arts
- Occupation: Actress
- Awards: Florencio Award: 12 received Konex Award, in 2011 Wings Awards

Estela Medina (born February 13, 1932) is a Uruguayan theater actress and was First Actress of the National Comedy until 2008. She is a resident actress at the Solís Theater.

== Biography ==
Estela Medina was born and raised in Montevideo. Αs a teenager, she entered the Margarita Xirgu Multidisciplinary School of Dramatic Arts. She graduated and made her debut in 1950. Ηer first works were Romeo and Juliet and a small role in La Patria en Armas by Juan León Bengoa.

In 1950, she joined the National Comedy as part of Uruguay's official cast. Among her most remembered works are:

- The Cherry Orchard by Anton Chekhov
- The Cardinal of Spain by Henry de Montherlant
- Fuenteovejuna by Lope de Vega
- Ibsen's A Doll's House
- La dama boba by Lope de Vega
- Valle-Inclán's Voces de gesta (in 1967)
- Mary Stuart (1968) by Schiller
- The Prodigious Shoemaker (1972) by Federico García Lorca
- Phaedra (1973) by Jean Racine
- Electra and Oedipus Rex by Sophocles (1984)
- Those of Barranco by Gregorio de Laferrère (1993)
- The Road to Mecca (1999) by Athol Fugard
- Three Tall Women by Edward Albee
- Mephisto by Ariane Mnouchkine
- Tartuffe by Molière
- Quartet (1997) by Heiner Müller
- The Werner Schwab Presidents
- La Dorotea by Lope de Vega
- The Murder of Nurse George by Frank Marcus
- Ashes (2003) by Harold Pinter

With the one-person show Retablo de Vida y Muerte, she toured internationally, performing in Spain, France, Portugal, the Netherlands, Italy, England, the United States, Honduras, Guatemala, Venezuela, and Colombia in 1977–1978. She has since presented the show regularly in Latin American Theater Festivals (Colombia, Santiago a Mil, etc.).

Medina retired from the Uruguayan National Comedy in 2008 with Blood Wedding by Federico García Lorca directed by Mariana Percovich, the same play Medina debuted in the National Comedy with.

She returned to the Solís Theater in January 2009 with La Amante Inglesa by Marguerite Duras. That same year she premiered the one-man show Rose by Martin Sherman, under the direction of Mario Morgan and was acclaimed by critics.

During the following decade, Medina appeared in many plays at the Solís Theater. She premiered the 2010 production, The Rules of Urbanity in the Modern Society by Jean-Luc Lagarce, under the direction of Rubén Szuchmacher, a show that later took her to Buenos Aires. The following year, she starred in Ingmar Bergman's Sonata de Otoño, directed by Omar Varela; and Secret Ceremony, a play inspired by the novel of Argentinian writer Marco Denevi and directed by Oscar Barney Finn.

Círculo de Tres, by Álvaro Malmierca and directed by María Varela, was one of Medina's two starring roles in 2012. She also performed in Madres al Límite, by Mónica Bottero, directed by Omar Varela; she left the performance of the first play with half an hour to get to the second, which caused some reviews to call her a "magnificent, hyper actress".

In 2013, she revived, together with Levón, Cuarteto by Heiner Müller, and Las Damas del Unicornio, a concert-recital with a selection of Uruguayan poets directed by poet Jorge Arbeleche. Bernhard followed in 2014, directed by Levón, which won the European Union Scene Award and the 2014 Florencio Award for Best Show. Sangre Joven, by Peter Asmussen, directed by Gerardo Begérez, premiered in October 2014 and continued into 2015.

Ellas por Ella, a selection of Uruguayan poets with a libretto by Levón and direction by Homero González Torterolo, was staged in Granada, Spain, during April 2015's VI Conference on Spanish Republicanism. In this work, Medina evoked the figure of her teacher Margarita Xirgu.

Medina starred in the 2016 play En La Laguna Dorada, by Ernest Thompson, again directed by Gerardo Begérez at the Teatro Circular in Montevideo, in a season that lasted through the year. She went to San Sebastián to perform in the 2017 play Only a theater actress, again directed by Levón, with a text by Gabriel Calderón about the famous actress Margarita Xirgu. The piece was later premiered in Montevideo and in various cities of Latin America. On August 25, 2018, the play La golondrina premiered at the Teatro del Notariado, directed by Gerardo Begérez, which deals with the terrorist attack on the Pulse bar in Florida.

During her career, Estela Medina has made record recordings such as "Retablo de vida y muerte" and "Testimomio de una cultura asesinada" (both in 1976) and participated in the album Ágape. Poemas de Jorge Arbeleche in 1997.

== Awards and honors ==
Estela Medina was distinguished with the Florencio Award twelve times. Six awards were for Best Actress: in 1962 for Juana la Loca from El Cardenal de España; in 1968 as María Estuardo from María Estuardo; in 1969 for Sor Juana de los Ángeles from Los Demonios; in 1981 for the title role in La Planta; in 1997 as Madame de Merteuil from Quartet; and in 1999 for Miss Helen from El camino a La Mecca. She received the Florencio de Oro in 1999. And she also won four times for Supporting Actress: in 1970 for Mercy Croft from The Murder of Nurse George; in 1981 as Leonor from Los Cuentos del Final; in 1985 for Ariane Mnouchkine's Myriam de Mefisto; and in 2001 for Lady A from Three Tall Women. She also won the Florencio de Oro a la Trayectoria in 2001 for her career. She stands out in repertory theater, especially in the classics of Spanish theater.

Her career was recognized in 1997 by the newspaper El País, which has awarded her the Silver and Bronze Iris Award. The B'nai B'rith honored her with the Golden Candelabra Award in 1996. In 2003, she received the Life Achievement Award at the Teatro Avante, and she was given the Award for a Lifetime Dedication to the Performing Arts, at the XVII International Hispanic Theater Festival in Miami, Florida, United States.

In 2004, she was declared an Illustrious Citizen of Montevideo, receiving the Keys to the city from Mariano Arana, during the Reopening Ceremony of the Solís Theater.

On November 22, 2005, the Government of France named her Chevalier de l'Ordre des Arts et des Lettres, in a ceremony held by the French Ambassador Rapin in Uruguay; a distinction that is granted to those who, in addition to having a noteworthy career in their trade, have promoted cultural exchanges between Uruguay and France with their work.

In March 2009, she was named an Academic of the National Academy of Letters of Uruguay.

On April 30, 2010, she received the appointment of Dame of the Order of Isabel la Católica, which was granted to her by King Juan Carlos I of Spain for her dissemination of the Spanish classics. In tribute to her, the Cultural Center of Spain in Montevideo honored the actress, naming their auditorium Sala Estela Medina.

Medina received the Konex Mercosur Show Award: 'Best Artist of the Decade' in October 2011 for her work during the prior decade in Latin America. The following year, she was given the Society of Uruguayan Actors' Alberto Candeau Award, for Career and Commitment. The Delmira Agustini Medal was then given to her in July 2014, by the Ministry of Education and Culture of Uruguay, given for outstanding contributions to Uruguayan culture and art.

During 2015, Medina received the Shakespeare Prize, at the close of the 1st Uruguay Shakespeare Festival. The CIDDAE Exhibition Hall of the Solís Theater was named the 'Estela Medina' Room in her honour. The Uruguayan Society of Performing Artists (SUDEI) also honoured her.

On August 18, 2015, she was named Honorary Academician of the National Academy of Letters of Uruguay, a distinction that she thanked with a lyrical-dramatic recital in lieu of a speech. She was granted an honorary doctorate by the University of the Republic on June 14, 2016; she was the first artist and the fifth woman recipient of the accolade. Medina was awarded the Lifetime Achievement Award during the sixth edition of the Manuel Oribe Awards held on Monday, November 19, 2018.
