= Dino Armas =

Uruguayan theater director and writer (born 1941)

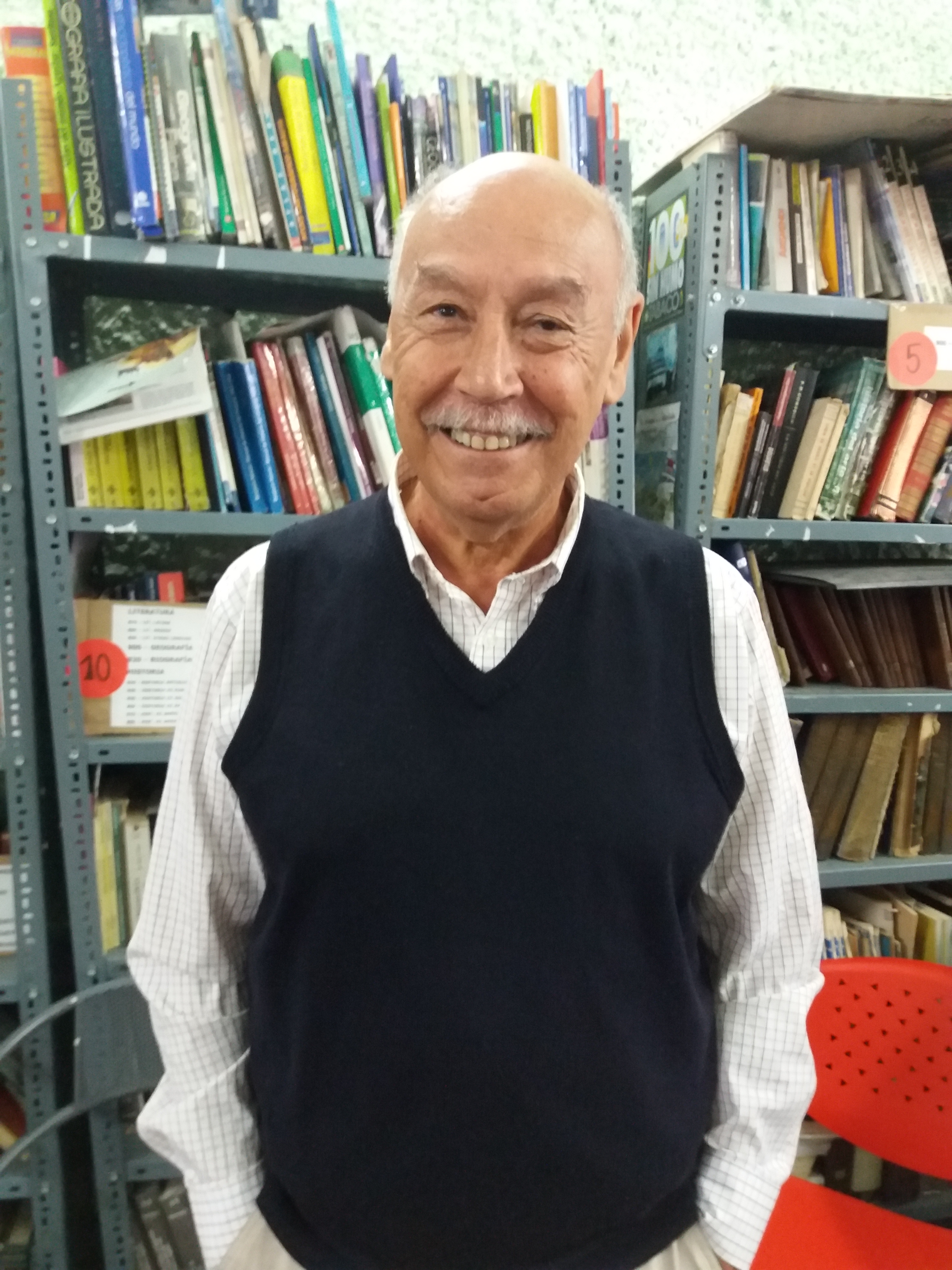
- Dino Armas in 2018.
- Born: Matías Armas Lago; 20 November 1941 (age 84); Montevideo, Uruguay
- Occupations: Theater director, writer
- Awards: Florencio Award (1993); Silver Morosoli Award (2006); Golden Candelabrum Award (2015)

Matías "Dino" Armas Lago (born 20 November 1941) is a Uruguayan theater director and writer.

== Biography ==
Matías Armas was born in the Montevidean neighborhood of Villa del Cerro, where he lived until he was 20 years old. His parents were Matías Armas, a port worker of socialist extraction, and Nicanda Lago Méndez, a housewife. He owes the pseudonym "Dino" to his father, who started calling him that after the first name of an Italian footballer.

The neighborhood, the early years of his life, and his family have important presence in his written work. It was during his adolescence that he first approached a theater group that worked at the Rampla Juniors Fútbol Club in his neighborhood.

He studied teaching and worked for 30 years as a teacher of primary education, until he retired with the position of school director.

In 1965 his first work, En otro y último ardiente verano, won one of the first three prizes in a theater contest organized by the El Tinglado Theater.

He is one of the most prolific Uruguayan playwrights, and his works have been staged in Latin America, the United States, and Europe. The 2009 film El novio de la muerta is based on two of his plays: Sus ojos se cerraron (1992) and Mujeres solas.

Armas has produced and directed adaptations of texts by authors such as Prosper Mérimée, Saint-Exupéry, and Henry Miller. He is the author of more than 60 plays. In addition to directing them in person, they have also been directed by Elena Zuasti, Jaime Yavitz, Omar Varela, Carlos Aguilera, Gloria Levy, Lucila Irazábal, Lucía Sommer, Antoine Baldomir, Marcelino Duffau, and others.

He has won numerous prizes, such as the 1993 Florencio Award for best national author text for Se ruega no enviar coronas, the 2006 Silver Morosoli Award for career achievement, first prize in the unpublished theater-drama category of the Ministry of Education and Culture's 2011 Annual Literature Prizes for Ave Mater, the 2015 Florencio for 50-year career and in the comedy category for Sus ojos se cerraron, and the 2015 Golden Candelabrum Award from the Uruguayan branch of B'nai B'rith. He has also received awards for plays for children.

== Works ==
- 1965 En otro y último verano
- 1974 Carlitos del Mar
- 1977 ¿Conoce usted al Doctor Freud?
- 1979 Susana's Tango
- 1980 Juana de siempre
- 1981 Los soles amargos
- 1983 De las pequeñas cosas
- 1983 Todos los juegos, el juego
- 1985 Alias el Manco
- 1988 Pentágono
- 1989 Feliz Día, Papá
- 1990 Queridos cuervos
- 1990 Votar es un placer
- 1990 Montevideo, reír y llorar te veo
- 1990 La canción del soltero
- 1991 Se ruega no enviar coronas
- 1992 Sus ojos se cerraron
- 1992 Se ruega no enviar coronas
- 1992 Petunias Salvajes
- 1992 Gente como nosotros
- 1995 Apenas ayer
- 1996 La vida es una milonga
- 1996 Manos a la obra
- 1997 Atrás del MERCOSUR
- 1997 Dios salve a la señora
- 1999 Cosmópolis
- 1999 Día libre
- 2000 Extraños por la calle
- 2001 ¿Y si te canto canciones de amor?
- 2003 Rifar el Corazón
- 2003 Pagar el Pato (Tango para dos)
- 2004 Todos los juegos, el juego
- 2004 El clú de la Ivonne
- 2006 Cuentos al atardecer
- 2006 Para servirte mejor
- 2007 Trampas para divorciadas
- 2007 Pentágono
- 2007 Dos en la carretera
- 2007 La lujuria según Ramiro
- 2008 Red Velvet
- 2009 Los raros
- 2009 Nelson Pino y las mujeres del tango
- 2009 La curva de la felicidad
- 2011 Ave Mater
- 2011 Esos locos, locos amores
- 2011 Presente, señorita
- 2014 Lucas o El contrato
