= Alfonso (surname) =

Alfonso or Alphonso is a surname derived from the given name, the latter descending from Asturias and Cantabria. It may refer to:

== People ==
- Alicia Alfonso (born 1963), Uruguayan actress
- Celestino Alfonso (1916–1944), Spanish republican and volunteer fighter in the French resistance during World War II
- Equis Alfonso (born c. 1974), known as X-Alfonso, Cuban hip-hop and Afro-rock musician
- Kristian Alfonso (born 1963), Puerto Rican American soap opera actress
- Leopold Alphonso (born 1991), Malaysian footballer
- Michael Alfonso (1965–2007), ring name Mike Awesome, American professional wrestler
- Ozzie Alfonso (born 1945), Cuban-American TV director and producer
- Petrus Alphonsi (died after 1116), also known as Peter Alphonso, Spanish physician, writer, astronomer and polemicist
- Roland Alphonso (1931–1998), Jamaican saxophonist

== Ring name ==
- Bill Alfonso, ring name of William Matthew Sierra (born 1957), former professional wrestling referee and manager

== Fictional characters ==
- Oren Pierre Alfonso, in the Japanese TV series Kamen Rider Gaim
