= Jorge Medina (disambiguation) =

Jorge Medina (1968–2022) was a Bolivian civil rights activist and politician.

Jorge Medina may also refer to:

- Jorge Medina (cardinal) (1926–2021), Chilean prelate of the Catholic Church
- Jorge Medina Vidal (1925–2008), Uruguayan poet, educator, and literary critic
