= Artigas Institute for Teacher Education =

School in Uruguay

- Instituto de Profesores Artigas
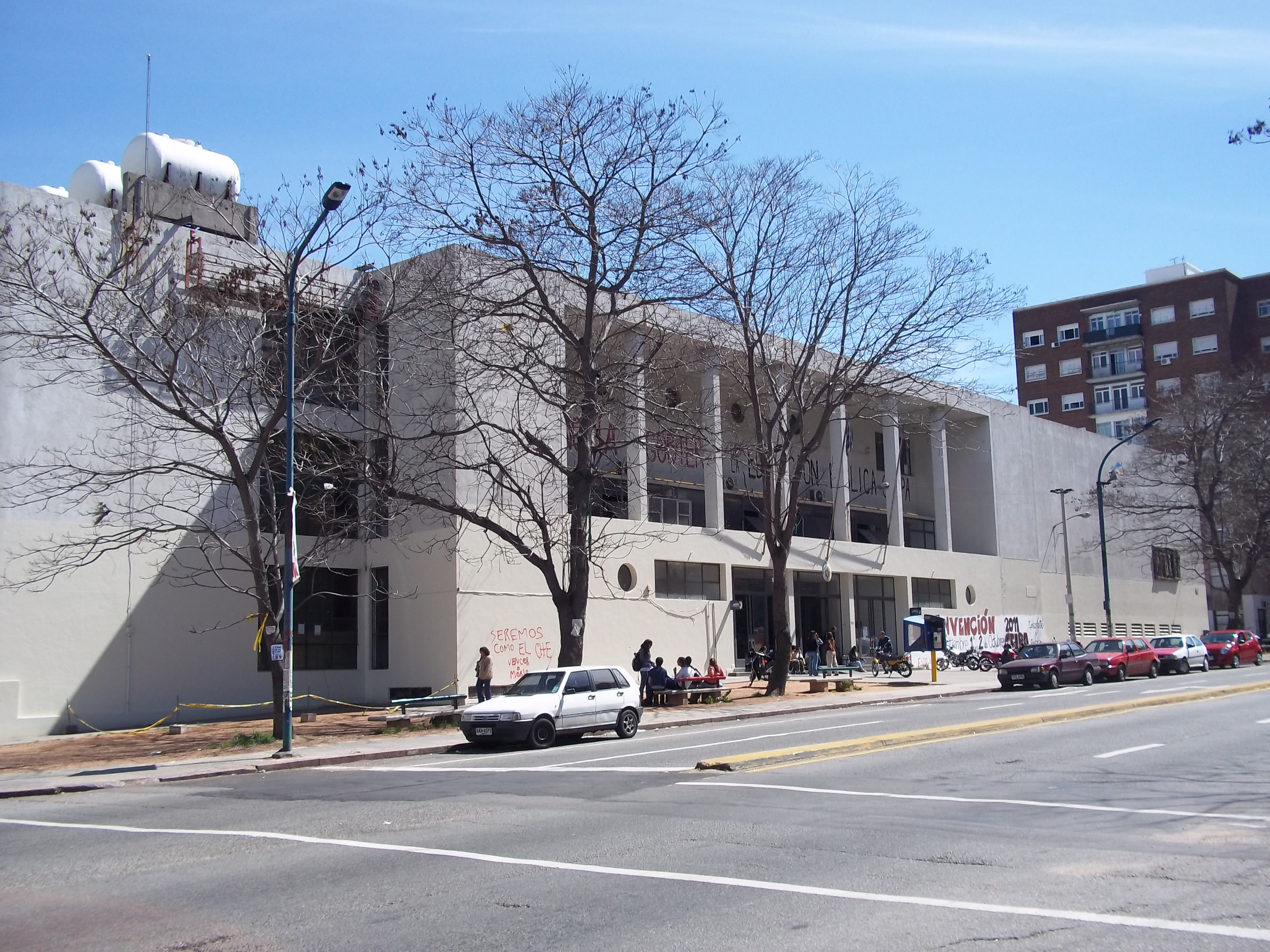
- IPA’s main building
- Other name: IPA
- Type: Public
- Established: 1951
- Students: 4,619 (2024)
- Location: 2025 Libertador Avenue, Montevideo, Uruguay
- Website: ipa.cfe.edu.uy/index.php

The Artigas Institute for Teacher Education (Spanish: Instituto de Profesores Artigas) (IPA) is a public higher education institution in Montevideo, Uruguay, that specializes in the training of secondary school teachers. It provides programs that combine academic and pedagogical preparation to train teachers in their respective fields.

Created in 1949 and operating since 1951, it was originally dependent on the Ministry of Public Instruction and has been under the authority of the National Administration of Public Education since 1985.

== History ==
The institute was created to prepare teachers for secondary education. Until its creation there was very few education possibilities to prepare teachers in Uruguay. In the 1930s the number of secondary students had risen significantly and the qualifications for teachers were being formally established. These new regulations and demand caused the creation of the institute.

=== Background ===
Until the creation of the Artigas Teachers Institute, there was no systematic training of teachers for secondary education in Uruguay. The majority of the teachers were professionals who graduated from the University of the Republic or were self-taught who met certain requirements and made it possible to cover the needs of teachers.

In 1934 the modality of attached teachers began and it was only between 1944 and 1945 that the first precedent of institutionalizing teacher training was regulated. The aspiring teachers had to undergo a two-year systematic training in their specialization and carry out teaching practice alongside outstanding professors. The growing number of Secondary students made it necessary to think not only about increasing the number of teachers, but also about specializing them into fields.

=== Creation ===
The Teachers' Institute was created by Law on July 2, 1949 and began operating two years later, in 1951,: led by its first director and founder, Antonio Grompone. Inspired by the model of the Ecole Normale Supérieure of Paris, the newly created institute sought to train teachers based on excellence and avant-garde at both a theoretical and practical level. The ideal was based on training a professional both in the field, and of the theory of each discipline and in educational practice, in contrast to the Faculty of Humanities model, which had been promoted by the Uruguayan philosopher Carlos Vaz Ferreira. The institute's training plan during the four years focused on three strong cores

- Pedagogical training common to all specialties.
- Training in the chosen specialty.
- Teaching practice of two years with a teacher of outstanding competence and one year - the last of the training - with a group led by the student themselves under the assistance of a didactics teacher .

From its origin, the institution did not have autonomy; In the beginning it depended on the Council of Secondary Education and was headed by a director advised by a commission. Later, thanks to the struggle of students, teachers and graduates, the Advisory and Consultative Council (CAC) was created made up of the three orders.

=== Interventions ===
The Artigas Teachers Institute was raided repeatedly during the sixties and seventies. These interventions were accompanied by arrests and dismissals of officials and teachers, many of whom also had to go into exile.

On October 9, 1967, the Institute was raided within the framework of the implementation of the Prompt Security Measures decreed by President Oscar Gestido.

The operation was carried out by grenadiers, who proceeded to arrest all the teachers, students and officials present, including the Director of the Institute.

==== The Bell ====
Converted into a symbol of its historical memory, the IPA bell rang at the beginning and end of each day, since the founding of the Institute. The object was removed on the night of September 5, 1973 by former secretary Eduardo Pereda, when the government decreed the intervention of the Artigas Teachers Institute, after the Coup d'état. Pereda, then being a young official, kept it for forty years—including her stay in exile—and engraved inscriptions with important dates as a way to rescue the memory and preserve the history of the Institute.

The bell has been cataloged as a symbol of identity and resistance, and was delivered on June 4, 2014 to the Central Board of Directors of the National Administration of Public Education by Eduardo Pereda, in a formal ceremony held in the Assembly Hall of the Artigas Teachers Institute.

== Operation ==
Since its creation the Institute has had many changes both due to politics and internal pressures. The admissions exams for different languages and specialties have been changed, most notably in 1977, 1986, 2008, and 2010.

Until 1976, admission was through a rigorous exam and with a numerus clausus of ten admissions per year for each specialty, a situation that contrasted with the free access to study at the university.

The 1977 Plan, a product of the civil-military dictatorship, modified the Institution's curriculum by training teachers in a three-year program that did not meet the minimum requirements to be considered an academic degree, neither in number of hours nor in the training of the Institute's own teachers. This was due to the fact that many of its teachers from 1972 onwards had to go into exile or were dismissed by the dictatorial regime of the 70s and 80s.

This led to the start of an IPA that, instead of training for excellence, did so for the secondary education market, initiating a period of decline in Uruguayan teacher training. In 1986, the current plan was approved, where the structure of 4 years of duration and 3 special didactics was resumed.

Later, the demanding entrance exam was replaced by a basic language test for admission to the institution, while for admission to some subjects, such as Spanish, English, music and drawing, another special test was also required. The number of students and graduates of the IPA also increased considerably. Teacher training for secondary education was diversified, including Regional Teacher Training Centers (CERP) that extended teacher training to the departments of Canelones ( Atlántida ), Rivera, Colonia, Salto, Maldonado and Florida, but were criticized for neglecting the quality of training and for budgetary problems.

In 2008, a new plan was introduced in all teacher training centres, which maintains the original characteristics of its founding plan. There is no basic language test, although the admission tests for music, English, Italian and Portuguese teachers are maintained. This was in part due to the number of failures within the entrance exams. Within the framework of a review of teacher training in 2010, an adjustment was made to the so-called 2008 Plan, due to the levels of failure and desertion that were recorded.

Another plan was introduced in 2023 that allowed students of the Institute to take additional exams and graduate with more experience in their fields.

In 2024 the government of Uruguay announced that a number of Sodre Schools would be equipped to match the IPA and allow more teachers to enter the workforce through standardized exams.

There is consideration about turning the academy into a University Institution of Education.

== Building ==
The current building of the Artigas Professors' Institute was built and inaugurated on July 31, 1939, and was designed by architect Octavio de los Campos to house the headquarters of the then Women's University, and later the Liceo Instituto Batlle y Ordóñez. In 1979, the building became the headquarters of the National Teaching Institute, housing the Normal Institute No. 1, the Higher Teaching Institute and the Artigas Teachers Institute, with the latter keeping the building as the Instituto de Profesores Artigas.

== Notable alumni ==
- Cesar Campodónico
- Blanca Rodriguez
- Eugenio Coseriu
- Carlos Real de Azúa
- Jose Pedro Diaz
- Lauro Ayestarán
- Dolores Castillo
- Jose D'Elia
- José Claudio Williman
- Eduardo Gianarelli
- Benjamin Nahum
- German Rama
- Jorge Medina Vidal
- Circe Maia
- Ana Frega
- Emir Rodríguez Monegal
- Gerardo Caetano
- Cristina Peri Rossi
- Monica Olave
- Yamandú Orsi
