= Carlos Aguilera =

Carlos Aguilera may refer to:

- Carlos Aguilera (theater director) (1945–2009), Uruguayan theater director
- Carlos Aguilera (Uruguayan footballer) (born 1964), Uruguayan footballer
- Carlos Aguilera (Spanish footballer) (born 1969), Spanish footballer
- Carlos Mastretta Aguilera (born 1984), Mexican race car driver
