= Marosa di Giorgio =

Uruguayan poet and novelist

- Born: María Rosa di Giorgio; 1932
- Died: 2004 (aged 71–72)
- Writing career
- Notable awards: Fraternity Award

Marosa di Giorgio (née María Rosa di Giorgio Médici, Salto, 1932 – Montevideo, 2004) was a Uruguayan poet and novelist.

Marosa di Giorgio is considered one of the most singular voices in Latin America. Critics tend to agree that her writing is greatly influenced by European surrealism, although her vocabulary, style, and imagery are uniquely her own. Her work deals predominantly with the imaginary world of childhood and nature.

In the past few years, Latin American critics such as Hugo Achugar, Luis Bravo, Leonardo Garet, Sylvia Guerra, María Alejandra Minelli, and María Rosa Olivera-Williams have explored Marosa Di Giorgio's writing. Uruguayan poet Roberto Echavarren published in 1991 "Transplatinos", which offers an excellent introduction to Di Giorgio's writing. Selected poems from The March Hare have been translated into English by K.A. Kopple and published in 1995 by Exact Change Yearbook. An article discussing gender politics, parody, and desire (as elaborated by Gilles Deleuze), also written by K.A. Kopple, appeared in March 2000 in the Journal of Latin American Cultural Studies. In'Identity, Nation, Discourse: Latin American Women Writers and Artists, edited by Claire Taylor (Cambridge Scholars Publishing, 2009), Soledad Montañez opens up a new discussion of Di Giorgio's erotic writing. Montañez shows how "Di Giorgio's erotic prose illustrates the representation and performance of patriarchal hierarchy as a perverse comedy, creating a genre that constructs gender narratives in order to undermine the patriarchal system from within." Montañez also affirms that "The effect achieved in Marosa's radicalised narrative is ultimately a mocking performance, a burlesque discourse that reveals and denounces domination and power. Through a perverse representation, Marosa exposes the complicated matter of culturally constructed sexual norms and develops a writing that is at the same time disturbing and astonishing" (2009: 158).

In 1982, she received the Fraternity Award for literature.

== Works ==
- Poemas (1954)
- Humo (1955)
- Druida (1959)
- Historial de las violetas (1965)
- Magnolia (1968)
- La guerra de los huertos (1971)
- Está en llamas el jardín natal (1975)
- Papeles Salvajes (recompilation)
- Clavel y tenebrario (1979)
- La liebre de marzo (1981)
- Mesa de esmeralda (1985)
- La falena (1989)
- Membrillo de Lusana (1989)
- Misales (1993)
- Camino de las pedrerías (1997)
- Reina Amelia (1999)
- Diamelas a Clementina Médici (2000)
- Rosa mística (2003)

=== English translations ===
- The History of Violets tr. Jeannine Marie Pitas. Ugly Duckling Presse, New York, 2010. ISBN 9781933254708 (Historial de las violetas)
- Diadem tr. Adam Giannelli. BOA editions, Rochester, 2012. ISBN 9781934414972 (Historial de las violetas, Magnolia, La guerra de los huertos, Está en llamas el jardín natal, Clavel y tenebrario, La liebre de marzo, Mesa de esmeralda, & La falena)
- Jasmine for Clementina Medici tr. Peter Boyle. Vagabond Press, Sydney & Tokyo, 2017. ISBN 9781922181794 (Diamelas a Clementina Médici)
- I Remember Nightfall tr. Jeannine Marie Pitas. Ugly Duckling Presse, New York, 2017. ISBN 9781937027599 (Historial de las violetas, Magnolia, La guerra de los huertos & Está en llamas el jardín natal)
