= Gilardoni =

Gilardoni is a surname. Notable people with the surname include:

- Daniele Gilardoni (born 1976), Italian lightweight rower
- Domenico Gilardoni (1798–1831), Italian opera librettist
- Eduardo Gilardoni (born 1935), Uruguayan composer and musician
- Henri Gilardoni (1876–1937), French sailor
- Marina Gilardoni (born 1987), Swiss skeleton racer
