= Fraternity Award =

Uruguayan Jewish society award

Premio Fraternidad
- Marcelo Jelen Award
- Native name: Premio Fraternidad Máximo Brenner
- Awarded for: Uruguayan culture
- Sponsored by: B'nai B'rith
- Country: Uruguay
- First award: 1982
- Currently held by: Alicia Alfonso

The Fraternity Award (Spanish: Premio Fraternidad) is an honor given annually by the Uruguayan branch of the Jewish organization B'nai B'rith.

== History ==
The Uruguayan branch of B'nai B'rith created the Fraternity Award in 1982, to promote the arts and to support national artists in the areas of Literature, Plastic Arts, Visual Arts, Dance, Theater, and Music. The prize consists of granting a trip to Israel and a country in Europe, which allows the winner to get in touch with the development and cultural projection of other areas. The winner performs a concert, exhibition, play, or lecture.

Since 1986, it has been given together with the Golden Candelabrum Award, when the juror Alberto Candeau took the initiative to recognize the career of Uruguayan artists.

In 2012 the award was declared to be of national interest by President José Mujica.

== Winners ==
- 1982, Marosa di Giorgio (literature)
- 1983, Ernesto Aroztegui (plastic arts)
- 1984, Stella Santos (theater)
- 1985, Miguel Ángel Marozzi (music)
- 1986, Miguel Ángel Campodónico (literature)
- 1987, Hugo Longa (plastic arts)
- 1988, Héctor Manuel Vidal (theater)
- 1989, Esteban Falconi (music)
- 1990, Tomás de Mattos (literature)
- 1991, Wifredo Díaz Valdez (plastic arts)
- 1992, Jorge Curi (theater)
- 1993, Cristina García Banegas (music)
- 1994, Napoleón Baccino Ponce de León (literature)
- 1995, Nelson Ramos (plastic arts)
- 1996, Roberto Suárez (theater)
- 1998, Rafael Courtoisie (literature)
- 1999, Octavio Podestá (plastic arts)
- 2000, Levón Burunsuzian (theater)
- 2001, Francisco Simaldoni (music)
- 2002, Leonardo Garet (literature)
- 2003, Pilar González (plastic arts)
- 2004, Margarita Musto (theater)
- 2005: Jorge Camiruaga (music)
- 2006: Sylvia Riestra (literature)
- 2007: Álvaro Amengual (plastic arts)
- 2008: Mario Ferreira (theater)
- 2010: Federico Veiroj (film)
- 2012: Federica Folco (dance)
- 2013: Ariel Britos (music)
- 2014, Fermín Hontou (plastic arts).
- 2015, Alicia Alfonso.
- 2016,
- 2017, Federico Nathan (música).
