= Ana Frega =

Uruguayan writer and historian

- Born: Ana Frega Novales; 1958 (age 67–68); Montevideo
- Education: University of the Uruguayan Republic; University of Buenos Aires
- Occupations: Professor, writer, historian

Ana Frega Novales (born 1958) is an Uruguayan writer and historian.

== Biography ==
In 1979, Frega graduated from the Instituto de Profesores Artigas, in Montevideo, Uruguay as a history teacher. The next year, she began her studies for a bachelor's degree in educational research at the Faculty of the Humanities and Educational Sciences of the University of the Uruguayan Republic and graduated in 1989. She obtained a postgraduate diploma in 1996 from the Faculty of Social Sciences, again at the University of the Republic with the thesis Temas de historia económica y social del Cono Sur: Argentina, Brasil y Uruguay en el siglo XX, the monograph of this thesis being Los saladeros en la región platense, 1810–1852. Frega began her doctoral studies at the University of Buenos Aires in 1996 and obtained her PhD in 2005. She was supervised by José Pedro Barrán and José Carlos Chiaramonte.

Since 1987, Frega has been a professor at the Instituto de Profesores Artigas, teaching National History II and La Plata's regional history since 2008. In 2006, she became a professor of history at the University of the Uruguayan Republic's Faculty of the Humanities and Educational Sciences.
