= Gerardo Caetano =

Uruguayan writer, teacher and historian

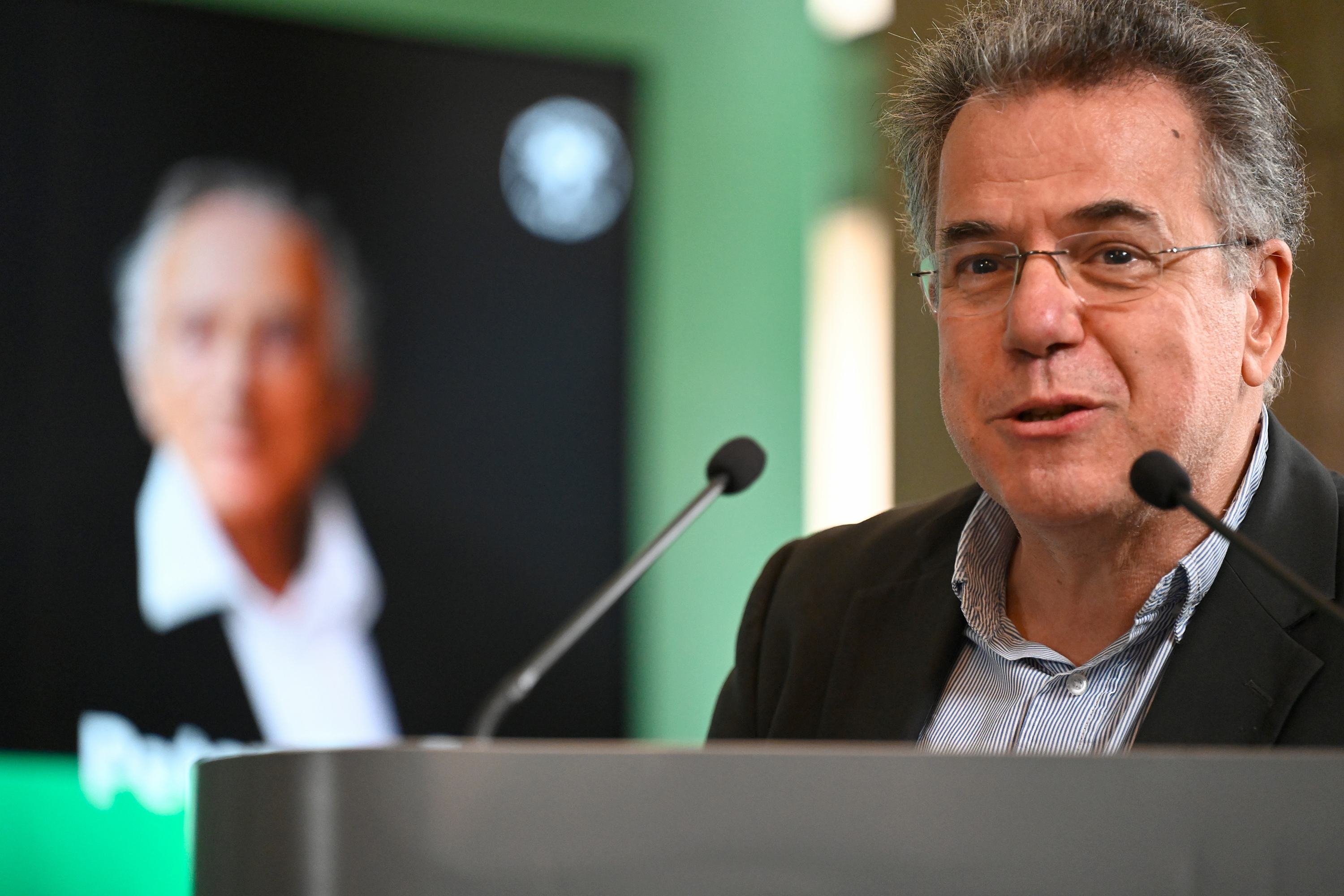
- Born: Gerardo Caetano Hargain; 30 April 1958 (age 68); Montevideo, Uruguay
- Occupations: journalist, writer, political
- Awards: Premio Bartolomé Hidalgo; Premio Konex Mercosur

Gerardo Caetano Hargain (born 30 April 1958) is a Uruguayan historian, professor, political scientist, and former association football player.

== Selected works ==
- La agonía del reformismo (1916-1925). Montevideo: CLAEH, 1983
- El asedio conservador (1925-1929). Montevideo: CLAEH, 1985
- El joven Quijano (1900-1933). Izquierda nacional y conciencia crítica. Montevideo: EBO, 1986 (with José Rilla)
- Breve historia de la dictadura (1973-1985). Montevideo: CLAEH-EBO, 1987 (with José Rilla)
- La partidocracia uruguaya: historia y teoría de la centralidad de los partidos políticos. Cuadernos del CLAEH, número 44, Montevideo, 2007. (with Romeo Pérez Antón and José Rilla)
- El nacimiento del terrismo (1930-1933). 3 tomos, Montevideo: EBO, 1989, 1990, 1991 (with Raúl Jacob)
- La República Conservadora (1916-1929). 2 tomos, Montevideo: Editorial Fin de Siglo, 1992, 1993
- Historias de la vida privada en el Uruguay (1996-1998, co-editor)
- Historia contemporánea del Uruguay : de la Colonia al Mercosur. Montevideo: Fin de Siglo, 1999 (with José Rilla)
- Los uruguayos del Centenario. Ciudadanía, nación, religión, educación. Montevideo: Taurus, 2000 (coordinador and author)
- Antología del discurso político en el Uruguay. De la Constitución de 1830 a la revolución de 1904. Montevideo: Taurus, 2004
- Las religiones en el Uruguay: algunas aproximaciones. Montevideo: La Gotera. 2004. ISBN 978-9974-7815-8-0. (with Teresa Porzecanski, Pablo Dabezies, and other authors)
- Ideas, política y nación en el Uruguay del siglo XX, en Oscar Terán (coord.); Historia Contemporánea del Uruguay. De la Colonia al siglo XXI. Montevideo: CLAEH - Ed. Fin de Siglo, 2005 (collaboration)
- 20 años de democracia. Uruguay 1985-2005. Visiones múltiples. Montevideo: Taurus, 2005 (Director and co-author)
- Terrorismo de Estado y el destino final de los detenidos desaparecidos durante la dictadura militar (academic coordinator, 2005-2006)
- Democracia y gerencia política. Innovación en valores, instrumentos y prácticas. Montevideo:CLAEH-OEA, 2006.
- La crisis mundial y sus impactos políticos en América del Sur. Montevideo: TRILCE, 2010.
- Liber Seregni. La unidad de las izquierdas. Montevideo: Ediciones de la Banda Oriental, 2012 (with Salvador Neves).
- Dictaduras y democracias en el Cono Sur (1961-2011). Montevideo: CEFIR-GIZ, 2012 (with Martín Mandressi).
- La provocación del futuro. Retos del desarrollo en el Uruguay de hoy. Montevideo:Planeta, 2014 (with Gustavo De Armas and Sebastián Torres).
- Las Instrucciones del Año XIII. 200 años después. 2013 Montevideo: Planeta, 2015 (with Ana Ribeiro and other historians).
- Tierras, reglamento y revolución. Reflexiones a doscientos años del reglamento artiguiste de 1815. Montevideo: Planeta, 2015 (with Ana Ribeiro).
- "La secularización uruguaya. (I). Catolicismo y privatización de lo religioso", (1997) en coautoriá con Geymonat, Roger (1997) Montevideo
- El “Uruguay laico”. Matrices y revisiones (2013). Montevideo: Taurus (with Roger Geymonat, Carolina Greising and Alejandro Sánchez)
- Alberto Methol Ferré. Reflexiones sobre geopolítica y la región. Montevideo: Planeta, 2019 (with Diego Hernández Nilson)
- La causa armenia entre el Ararat y Uruguay. Historia de un reconocimiento. Montevideo: Fundación Zelmar Michelini, 2020 (with Salvador Neves and Mauricio Rodríguez)
- El liberalismo conservador. Montevideo: Ediciones de la Banda Oriental, 2021.
