= Leonardo Garet =

Uruguayan writer and teacher

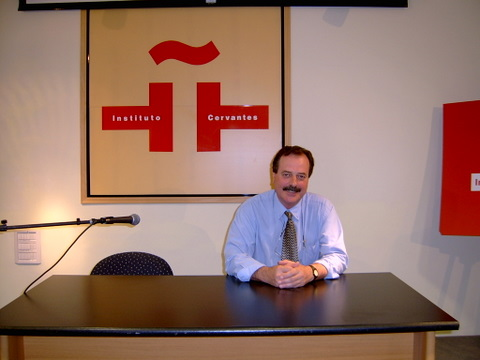
- Garet at Cervantes Institute, Tel Aviv, 2003
- Born: November 1949 (age 76); Salto, Uruguay
- Known for: Literature
- Notable work: El ojo en la piedra, El libro de los suicidas, Anabákoros
- Awards: Fraternity Award (2002)
- Website: www.leonardogaret.com.uy

Leonardo Garet is a Uruguayan writer, teacher, and member of the National Academy of Uruguay.

== Biography ==
Leonardo Garet was born in Salto, Uruguay in 1949. He was a teacher from 1972 to 2008, mostly in private high schools Colegio y Liceo Nuestra Señora del Carmen and [Colegio y Liceo Carlos Vaz Ferreira in Salto. Also, he was Professor of Instituto de Estudios Superiores and Instituto de Filosofía Ciencias y Letras in Montevideo, Uruguay.

Garet is a poet, narrator, literary critic and cultural manager. He is the author of several books published in Uruguay and abroad. He has been a Corresponding Member of the National Academy of Uruguay since 2008.

In 2002 he received the Fraternity Award for literature.

== Publications ==
=== Poetry ===
- Patio, Montevideo, 2012
- Pentalogía, Montevideo, Ed. de autor, 1972
- Primer escenario, Caracas, Venezuela, Árbol de fuego, 1975
- Máquina final, Montevideo, Ed. de la Balanza, 1978
- Pájaros extranjeros, Montevideo, Destabanda, 1988
- Palabra sobre palabra, Montevideo, Casa de Nuna y Editores Asociados, 1991
- Octubre, Montevideo Ed. de la Banda Oriental, 1994
- Cantos y desencantos, Montevideo, Aldebarán, 2000
- Saída de página, bilingual Spanish-Portuguese, Sant' Anna do Livramento (Brasil), Ed. de MZ Thomas y Grupo Literario de Artigas, 2001
- Wörter uber Wörter (anthology), bilingual Spanish-Deutch, Ed. Instituto Cultural uruguayo-alemán, 2002
- Bares en lluvia (con César Rodríguez Musmanno), Salto, Ediciones del Mercado, 2003
- Vela de armas,(I don't know how to translate the title) Córdoba (R. Argentina), Ediciones Alción, 2004
- La sencilla espiral de los sucesos, Montevideo, Ediciones de Hermes Criollo, 2005
- El ojo en la piedra, Córdoba (R.Argentina), Ediciones Alción, 2009

=== Narrative ===
- Los hombres del agua, Montevideo, Destabanda, 1988
- Los hombres del fuego, Montevideo, Ed. de la Banda Oriental, 1993
- La casa del juglar, Montevideo, Ed. de la Banda Oriental, 1996
- Los días de Rogelio, Montevideo, Ed. Fin de Siglo, 1998
- Las hojas de par en par, Montevideo, Ediciones de la Plaza, 1998
- Anabákoros, Montevideo, Fin de Siglo, 1999
- 80 noches y un sueño, Montevideo, Ediciones Linardi y Risso, 2004
- El libro de los suicidas, Montevideo, Ediciones Cruz del Sur, 2005

=== Essays and literary criticism ===
- Cervantes, Montevideo, ed. Librería Técnica, 1976
- Obra de Horacio Quiroga, 1978
- Carlos Sabat Ercasty, Montevideo, ed. Kappa, 1983
- Literatura de Salto, anthology and literary critics, Salto, Intendencia Municipal de Salto, 1990
- La pasión creadora de Enrique Amorim, Montevideo, Editores Asociados y Casa de Nuna,1990
- Vicente Aleixandre, Montevideo, Editores Asociados y Casa de Nuna, 1991
- Viaje por la novela picaresca, Montevideo, Editores Asociados y Casa de Nuna, 1991
- Vicente Huidobro, Montevideo, Editores Asociados, 1994
- Encuentro con Quiroga, Montevideo, Academia Uruguaya de Letras y Editores Asociados, 1994
- Horacio Quiroga por uruguayos –Compiler-, Montevideo, Academia Uruguaya de Letras y Editores Asociados, 1995
- Cuentos completos de Horacio Quiroga, edition, prologue and notes, Montevideo, Ediciones Cruz del Sur y Ediciones De la Banda Oriental, 2002
- Literatura de Artigas, anthology and literary critics, Grupo literario de Artigas, 2002
- El milagro incesante, life and work of Marosa di Giorgio, Montevideo, Aldebarán, 2006.
- Poesía del Litoral, Salto, Ediciones Aldebarán y Un solo litoral, Salto, 2007.
- Colección Escritores Salteños. XX volumes. Intendencia Municipal de Salto y Centro Comercial de Salto.
- Horacio Quiroga Obras Completas, edition, prologue and notes, Montevideo Ediciones Cruz del Sur, 2010

== Translations ==
Garet's stories and poems have been translated from Spanish to English, French, Portuguese, German, Italian, Dutch, Persian, Hindi, Bengali, Russian, Chinese, Guaraní and Norwegian.

== Anthology ==
- Cuentos por Uruguayos, by Walter Rela, Montevideo, ed. Graffiti, 1994.
- Poesía Uruguaya del siglo XX, de Walter Rela, Montevideo, ed. Alfar, 1995.
- Cuentos fantásticos del Uruguay, Anthology by Sylvia Lago, Laura Fumagalli y Hebert Benítez, Montevideo, ed. Colihue Sepé, 1999.
- Antología de poesía Latinoamericana, bilingual Spanish-Chinese, Beijing, ed. del Grupo Latinoamericano y del Caribe de Beijing y Editorial de
- Investigación y Estudio de Idiomas extranjeros de la República Popular China, 1994.
- Narradores y Poetas Contemporáneos, anthology by Ricardo Pallares, Montevideo, Academia Nacional de Letras y Ed. Aldebarán", 2000.
- El cuento uruguayo, anthology by Lauro Maruada and Jorge Morón, Montevideo, Ediciones La Gotera, 2002.
- Nada es igual después de la poesía, by Gerardo Ciancio, Montevideo, Ministerio de Educación y Cultura, 2005.
- La Fraternidad de la Palabra, B'nai B'rith, Montevideo, 2005.
- Muestra de poesía uruguaya, by Ricardo Pallares and Jorge Arbeleche, Academia Nacional de Letras, 2009.
- Primer Congreso de poetas iraníes y del mundo, Teherán, 2009.
- Antología de la Narrativa Latinoamericana de Todos los Tiempos (Persian), Teherán, 2010. Include texts by Jorge Luis Borges, Adolfo Bioy Casares, Gabriel García Márquez, Roberto Arlt, Mario Vargas LLosa, Julio Cortázar, Horacio Quiroga, Juan Carlos Onetti and Leonardo Garet among other authors.
- Panorama de la narrativa fantástica uruguaya, by Lauro Marauda, Montevideo, Rumbo editorial, 2010

== Awards ==
- First National Literature Award (Essay) for Obra de Horacio Quiroga, 1978.
- First National Literature Award (Poetry) for Saída de Página, 2002.
- Fraternidad Award to literary career. B'nai B'rith Uruguay, 2002.
- Junta Departamental de Salto tribute for his cultural contribution, 2002.
- Julio Sosa Award for his contribution to national culture, Intendencia Municipal de Canelones, 2005.
