= Arotxa =

Uruguayan caricaturist

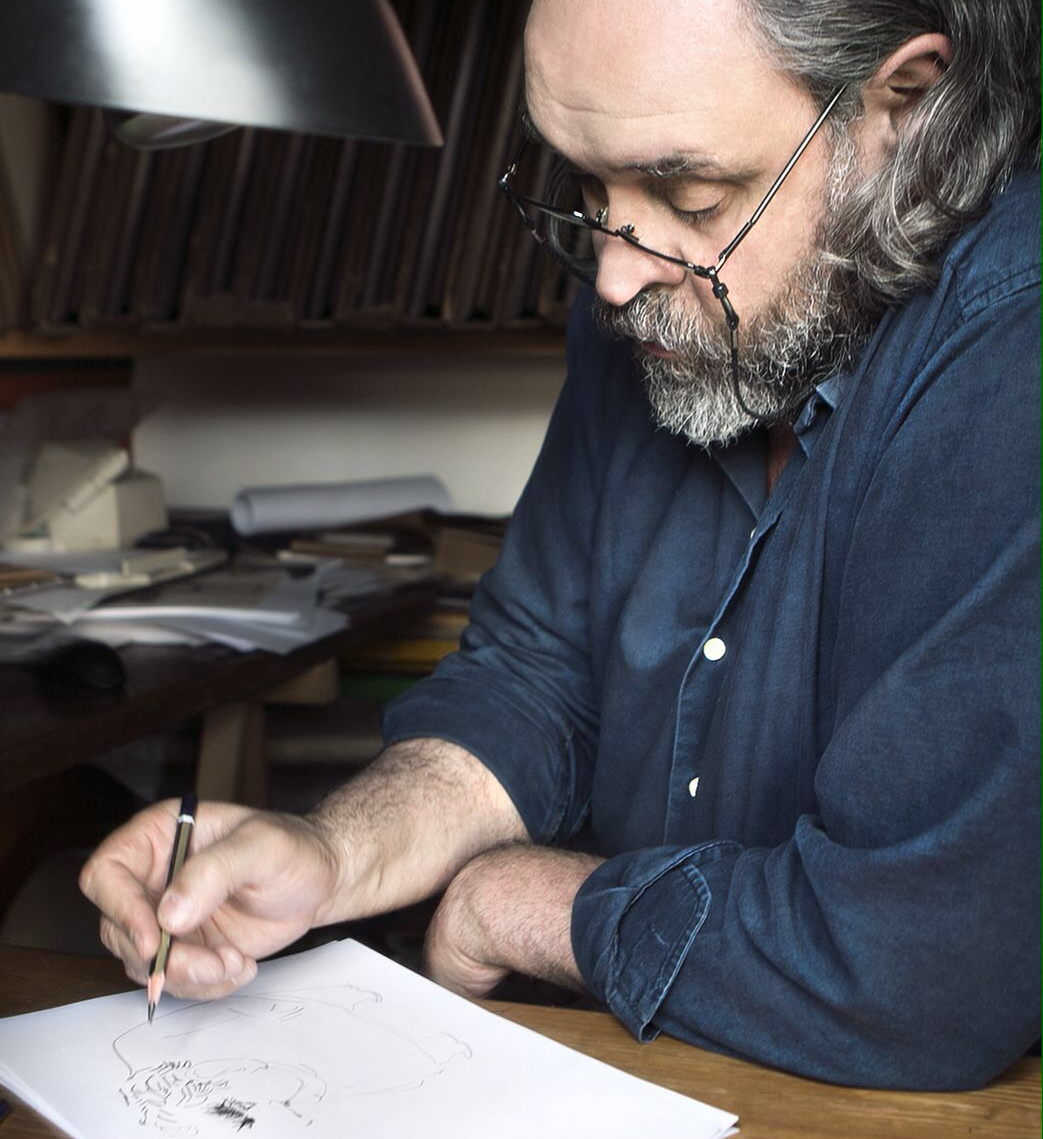
- Rodolfo Arotxarena
- Born: Rodolfo Arotxarena; September 7, 1958 (age 68); Montevideo, Uruguay
- Occupations: Caricaturist, Painter
- Awards: Wings Award

Arotxa (Rodolfo Arotxarena Montevideo, September 7, 1958), is a Uruguayan caricaturist.

== Career ==
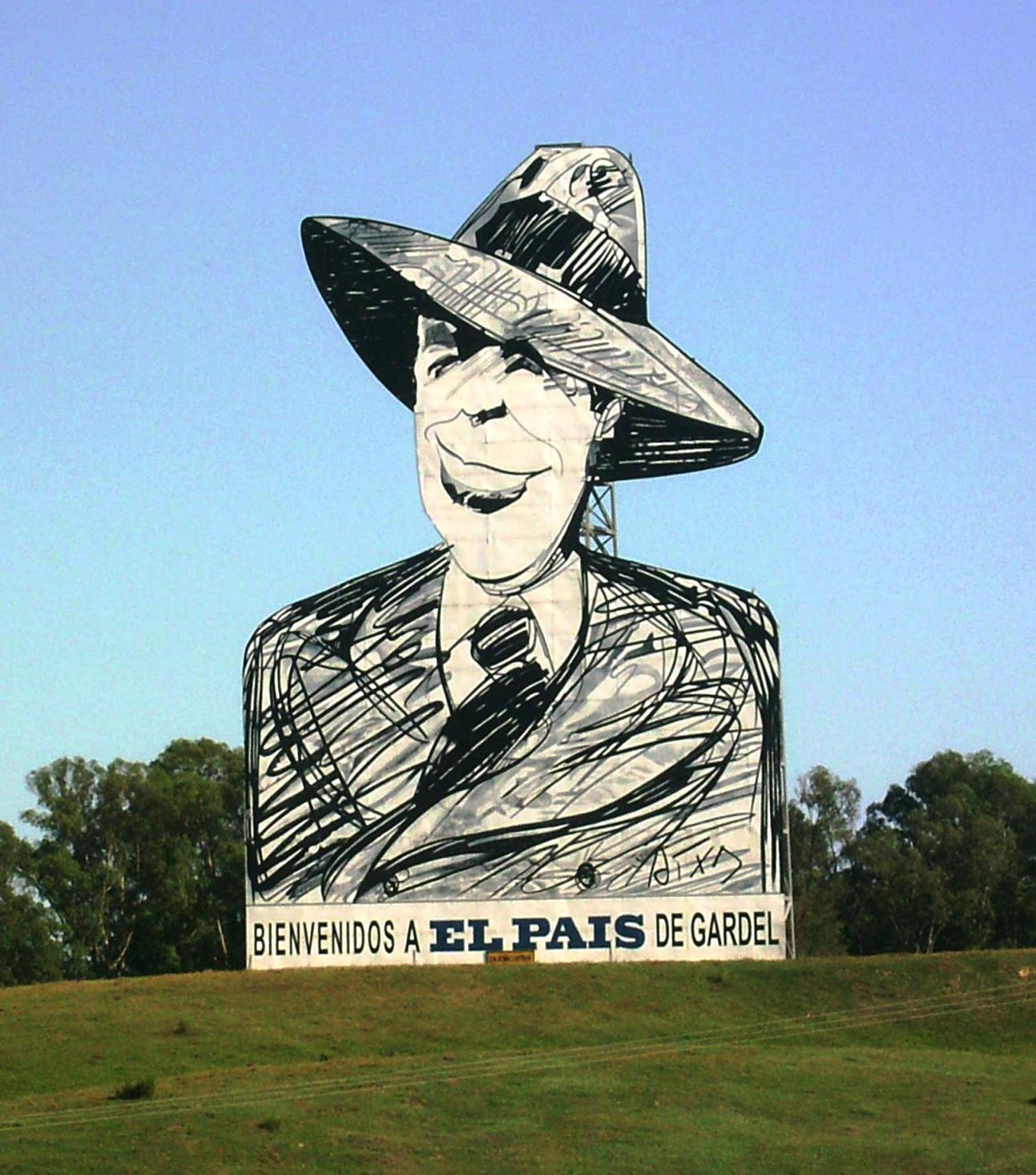
"Gardelazo" in Tacuarembó

Since 1975 he has been busy as caricaturist at El País. He has portrayed all Uruguayan politicians and international figures.

In 1983 he went to the United States and entered the pool Cartoonist and Writers Sindicate.

He has organized exhibitions in Uruguay, USA and Europe.

His biggest caricature is the "Gardelazo" in Tacuarembó, a gigantography 26 m tall in honor to tango singer Carlos Gardel.

He has painted as well, featuring his series "Caudillos".
