= Hugo Burel =

Uruguayan writer

José Hugo Burel Guerra
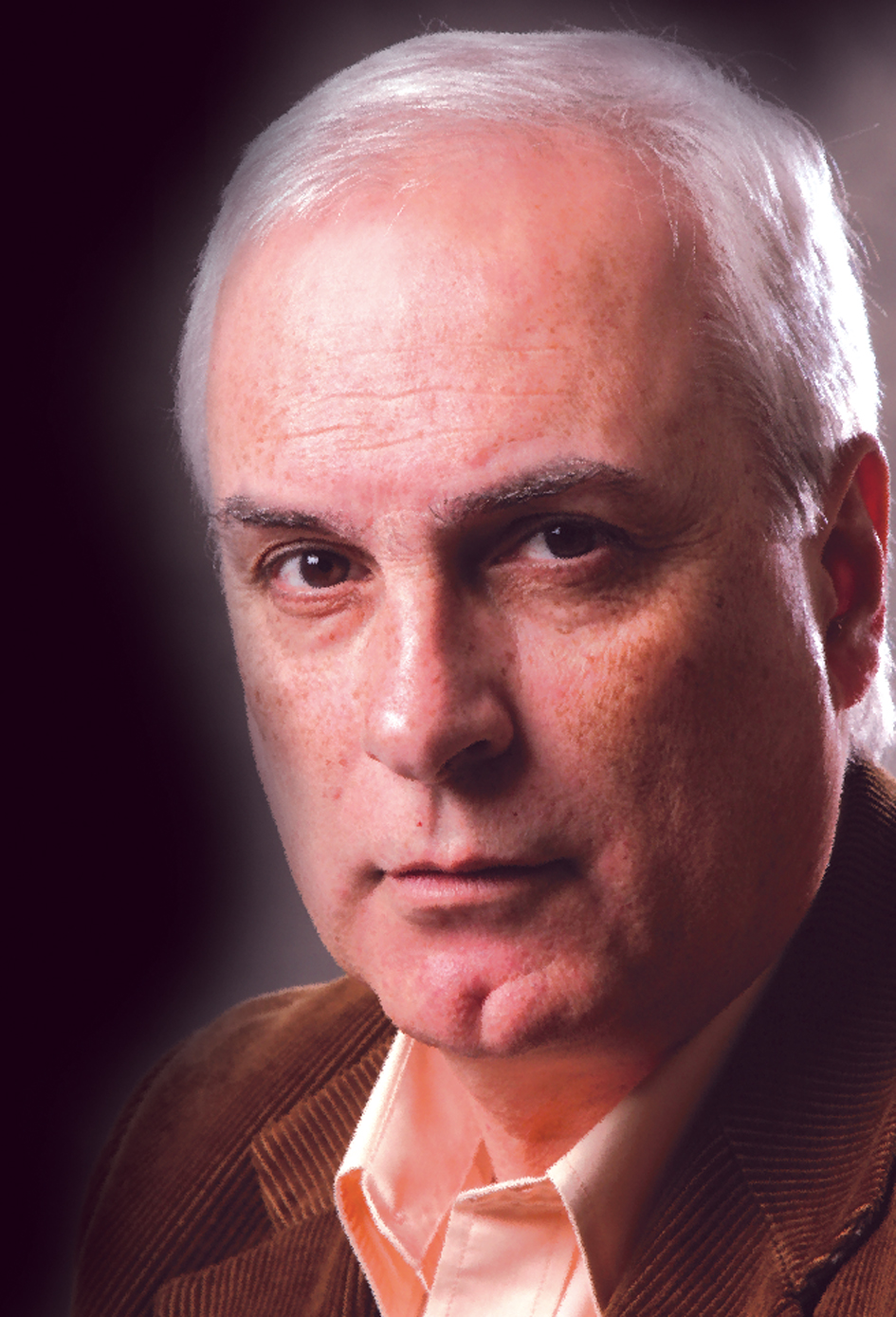
- Born: José Hugo Burel Guerra; March 23, 1951; Montevideo, Uruguay
- Education: Catholic University of Uruguay
- Occupations: Novelist, journalist, playwright
- Children: 2
- Awards: Premio Libro de Oro; Premio Alas; Premio Florencio; Premio Bartolomé Hidalgo

José Hugo Burel Guerra (March 23, 1951), is a Uruguay journalist and author.

== Biography ==
Burel has worked as a journalist at various national periodicals of Uruguay. He has also written several novels and anthologies. His most important works are Los más jóvenes cuentan (1976), Esperando a la pianista (1982), La alemana (1985) and Matías no baja (1986).

== Works ==
- Los más jóvenes cuentan (anthologie) 1976
- Esperando a la pianista 1982
- La alemana 1985
- El vendedor de sueños 1986
- Indicios de Eloísa 1989
- Tampoco la pena dura (Novel) 1991
- Solitario Blues 1993
- La perseverancia del viento 1994
- El ojo de vidrio y otras maravillas 1997
- El elogio de la nieve 1999
- El guerrero del crepúsculo 2002
- Tijeras de Plata 2003
- Los inmortales 2004
- El desfile salvaje 2007
- Diario de la arena 2010
- El club de los nostálgicos 2011
- El hombre con una sola sandalia 2012
- El caso Bonapelch 2014
