= Fermín Hontou =

Uruguayan cartoonist, illustrator, and caricaturist (1956–2022)

Fermín Hontou, also known by his nickname Ombú (11 September 1956 – 25 August 2022), was a Uruguayan cartoonist, illustrator, and caricaturist.

He worked for several press media, such as Opción, Jaque, La Hora Popular, El Dedo, Guambia, Brecha, Aquí, Cuadernos de Marcha, El País, Unomásuno, Caminos del Aire, Snif, Monga (Brazil), Fierro (Argentina), El Ojo Clínico (Spain), La Voce, La República, Playboy (Italy), Courrier International, and Le Monde (France).

== Awards ==
- 1990: Concurso para Logotipo de la 1.ª Feria Nacional de Artesanías (with Pablo Casacuberta).
- 2000: VIII Salón Internacional de dibujo para prensa, Porto Alegre.
- 2014: Fraternity Award, granted by B'nai B'rith Uruguay.
