= Ana Ribeiro =

- Born: Ana María del Carmen Ribeiro Gutiérrez; 22 October 1955 (age 70); Montevideo, Uruguay
- Education: University of Salamanca
- Occupations: Historian, writer, professor
- Awards: Bartolomé Hidalgo Award (2001, 2004, 2014); Morosoli Award (2005)

Ana María del Carmen Ribeiro Gutiérrez (born 22 October 1955), known as Ana Ribeiro, is a Uruguayan historian, writer, and professor. Her works are based on essays and novels that relate historical events of the country.

== Biography ==
Ana Ribeiro was born in Montevideo on 22 October 1955. In 1981 she obtained the title of graduate in historical sciences, with specialization in universal history, from the School of Humanities and Sciences of the University of the Republic. In 2008, she earned her diploma of advanced studies (DEA) in the doctorate of "Foundations of Historical Research" at the University of Salamanca. Her thesis, on royalist resistance on the Asunción-Montevideo axis during the wars of independence, first published in 2013 with the title Los Muy Fieles. Leales a la corona en el proceso revolucionario rioplatense. Montevideo-Asunción 1810–1820, won the Premio Extraordinario from the University of Salamanca for best thesis of the year.

Ribeiro has been teaching since 1988, mostly at the Catholic University of Uruguay. At that school she has taught the courses "Historiographic Currents", "National Historiographic Workshop" (of which she is also director), "20th Century Historiography", "Main Currents of Thought in the West", "Theories of Communication IV", and "Social Theory III", which she has been in charge of since 2007.

She also worked at the Instituto de Profesores Artigas from 1992 to 2004, teaching "History of Historiography" and "Theory and Methodology of History". During 1999 and 2000 she taught the course "National Historiography", part of the postgraduate program in historical research at CLAEH.

In 1999, Ribeiro participated as a juror on the Teledoce television series Martini y Antel preguntan. From 2000 to 2001 she did the same on Channel 10's evening magazine Caleidoscopio, for its segment dedicated to history. In 2004, she was a panelist on Teledoce's Agenda Confidencial, hosted by Néber Araújo.

In addition, from 1979 to 2008 she worked as a teacher at several secondary education centers and at the Universidad del Trabajo del Uruguay (UTU).

Ribeiro has specialized in the history of national hero José Gervasio Artigas, and published Los Tiempos de Artigas in six volumes through El País's publishing house in 1999. She later made an exhaustive investigation in Paraguayan archives about his life in that country (from 1820 until his death in 1850). This led her to deepen her interest in the Supreme Dictator José Gaspar Rodríguez de Francia, who gave him political asylum. This material was reflected in her work El Caudillo y el Dictador (Planeta, 2004). The first of the two volumes of Los muy fieles is dedicated to the Spanish people of Asunción, and the second to those of Montevideo, given her great knowledge of both countries in the 19th century.

== Politics ==
Following the 2009 primary elections, Ribeiro decided to expressly support the National Party pre-candidate Jorge Larrañaga.

In the 2014 general election, Ribeiro took sixth place on the list of candidates for the Senate.

== Awards and honors ==
- 1990 – First Prize of the National Academy of Letters in the contest on "Currents of Contemporary Uruguayan Historiography (1940-1990)"
- 1992 – First Prize of the National Academy of Letters in the contest on "Currents of Uruguayan Historiography (1880-1940)"
- 1996 – First Prize of the National Academy of Letters in the contest on "Historians and chroniclers of Montevideo"
- 1998 – First Prize of the contest of essays organized by the newspaper El País on the "One Hundred Years of the Revolution of 1897"
- 2000 – "Woman of the Year" Award in the Literary category
- 2001 – Bartolomé Hidalgo Award, Revelation category, granted by the Uruguayan Book Chamber
- 2003 – "Woman of the Year" Award in the Literary category
- 2004 – Bartolomé Hidalgo Award, granted by the Uruguayan Book Chamber, in the non-fiction category, for El Caudillo y el Dictador
- 2004 – 2nd Prize of the Ministry of Education and Culture for the historical essay El Caudillo y el Dictador
- 2004 – Julio Sosa Prize, awarded by the municipality of Canelones
- 2004 – Dragon of San Fernando Prize, awarded by the Municipality of Maldonado
- 2005 – Silver Morosoli Award (career) in "Historical Research", given by the Lolita Rubial Foundation "for her contribution to culture, art, and science"
- 2014 – Bartolomé Hidalgo Award, granted by the Book Chamber of Uruguay, in the historical essay category, for Los Muy Fieles. Leales a la corona en el proceso revolucionario rioplatense. Montevideo-Asunción 1810–1820
- 2014 – Premio Extraordinario from the University of Salamanca, Spain, for her thesis on royalist resistance in Asunción and Montevideo during the wars of independence
