= Napoleón Baccino Ponce de León =

Uruguayan writer

Napoleón Baccino
- Born: Napoleón Baccino Ponce de León; 1947 (age 78–79); Montevideo, Uruguay
- Occupation: writer
- Awards: Fraternity Award; Casa de las Américas Prize

Napoleón Baccino Ponce de León (born Montevideo, 1947) is an Uruguayan writer. He is best known for his historical novel Maluco. La Novela de Los Descubridores, a fictional account of Magellan's circumnavigation of the world. The book won the Premio Casa de las Américas in 1989 and the Bellas Artes de Narrativa Colima Prize for Published Work in 1990. It was later translated into English by Nick Caistor and into French by Nelly Lhermillier.

In 2000, he published a non-fiction work, Bolsa de Valores de Montevideo 1867-2000, a bilingual study of the history of the economy in the Río de la Plata.
