= Sylvia Lago =

Uruguayan writer, teacher and literary critic

- Born: Sylvia Lago Carzolio; 20 November 1932 (age 93); Montevideo, Uruguay
- Education: Instituto de Profesores Artigas
- Occupations: Writer, teacher, literary critic

Sylvia Lago Carzolio (born 20 November 1932) is a Uruguayan writer, teacher, and literary critic. She has made a particular focus of women's issues, addressing various conflicts that women encounter in her work.

== Biography ==
Sylvia Lago was born in Montevideo on 20 November 1932. Her great-aunt was professor Elda Lago, a member of the Generación del 45, who bequeathed her home to the University of the Republic (UdelaR). Lago studied literature at the Instituto de Profesores Artigas (IPA). She carried out academic and scientific activities at the Department of Uruguayan and American Literature at UdelaR's Faculty of Humanities and Educational Sciences, eventually becoming its chair.

In 1962, she published her first work, the young adult novel Trajano, which won awards in contests organized by the magazine Número and the Departmental Council of Montevideo. Three years later, she published another novel, Tan solos en el verano. It was followed by La última razón in 1968. Her output was limited in the years after the 1973 coup d'état; she mainly published short story collections, such as Detrás del rojo, Las flores conjuradas, and El corazón de la noche.

In 1988, she published Quince cuentos para una antología. She also contributed to the anthologies Cuentos de nunca acabar (1992), Cuentos de atar (1993), and Erkundungen (1993), the latter in co-authorship with Rafael Courtoisie and Washington Benavides. Her 1995 book Días dorados, días en sombra contains works written between 1965 and 1995.

In 2002, her novel Saltos mortales won second prize at the Ministry of Education and Culture's annual literature contest.

She has served as a juror for literary competitions such as the Colihue Young Adult Novel Contest and the Juan Carlos Onetti Literary Contest.

== Selected publications ==
- 1962: Trajano, young adult novel, Vol. 115 of Colección Literaria Lyc, Ediciones Colihue SRL, ISBN 9505811152, 9789505811151
- 1962: Tan solos en el balneario, Editor Imprenta Panamericana
- 1965: Tan solos en el verano, novel
- 1968: La última razón, novel, Vol. 58 of Bolsilibros Arca, Editor Arca
- 1969: Detrás del rojo, Colección Carabela, Editorial Alfa
- 1972: Las flores conjuradas, Colección La Invención, Editorial Giron
- 1976: Eduardo Acevedo Díaz: El combate de la tapera, Vol. 28 of Manuales de literatura, Editorial Técnica
- 1984: Grafías: revista de los talleristas, with Jorge Arbeleche
- 1987: El corazón de la noche, Vol. 9 of Lectores de la Banda Oriental, 4th series, Ediciones de la Banda Oriental
- 1988: Quince cuentos para una antología
- 1988: La flecha hacia el vacío: introducción a la obra de Leopoldo Lugones, University of the Republic, Department of Uruguayan and American Literature of the Faculty of Humanities and Educational Sciences
- 1990: Cuentos de ajustar cuentas, Ediciones Trilce
- 1992: Los espacios de la violencia en la narrativa latinoamericana: (Asturias, Rulfo, Acevedo Díaz, Quiroga), Avances de investigación, University of the Republic, Department of Uruguayan and American Literature of the Faculty of Humanities and Educational Sciences
- 1994: Modalidades del discurso narrativo uruguayo de las últimas décadas (1960-1980): 1960–73: signos premonitorios, Vol. 1, with Nilo Berriel, Juan Duthu, and Laura Fumagalli; University of the Republic
- 1995: Días dorados, días en sombra, short stories, 1965–1995. Biblioteca del Sur, Grupo Editorial Planeta, ISBN 9974560039, 9789974560031
- 1996: Mario Benedetti: Cincuenta Años de Creación, Vol. 1 of Escritores Uruguayos, Aproximaciones Series, illustrated edition from the Faculty of Humanities and Educational Sciences of the University of the Republic, ISBN 997400053X, 9789974000537
- 1997: Actas de Las Jornadas de Homenaje a Juan Carlos Onetti, illustrated edition from the University of the Republic, Department of Uruguayan and American Literature
- 1997: Narrativa uruguaya de las últimas décadas (1960-1990), No. 2 of Escritores uruguayos: Aproximaciones, University of the Republic, ISBN 9974000734, 9789974000735
- 1997: Polifonía, with Jorge Arbeleche
- 1998: José Saramago en humanidades, 7 de setiembre de 1998, University of the Republic, Faculty of Humanities and Educational Sciences
- 1999: Cuentos Fantásticos del Uruguay, Libros del Timbó, with Laura Fumagalli, and Hebert Benítez Pezzolano; Ediciones Colihue, ISBN 9974530083, 9789974530089
- 2001: Ocho escritores uruguayos de la resistencia: entrevistas y textos, University of the Republic, ISBN 9974001722, 9789974001725
- 2002: Saltos mortales, novel, Biblioteca del Sur, illustrated edition from Editorial Planeta, ISBN 9974643104, 9789974643109
- 2002: El cuerpo como espacio político: literatura uruguaya insurrecta, No. 1 of Escritores uruguayos: Aproximaciones, Faculty of Humanities and Educational Sciences
- 2007: La adopción y otros relatos: antología personal, Spanish and Ibero-American writers, Editorial Planeta S.A., ISBN 9974643325, 9789974643321
- 2009: Cuentos con Secreto, Vol. 1 of Colección Atalaya: Narradores latinoamericanos, Editor Botella al Mar, ISBN 9974681219, 9789974681217
- 2011: Penumbras

=== Chapters of books ===
- 1993: La Muerte hace buena letra, contributors: Mario Benedetti, Omar Prego; 4th edition from Ediciones Trilce, ISBN 9974320631, 9789974320635
- 2001: Kongreßschrift; Festschrift, Serie Aproximaciones an autores uruguayos, edited by Sylvia Lago, Alicia Torres, and the University of the Republic Publishing Department, ISBN 9974001595, 9789974001596
