= Alicia Alfonso =

Uruguayan actress

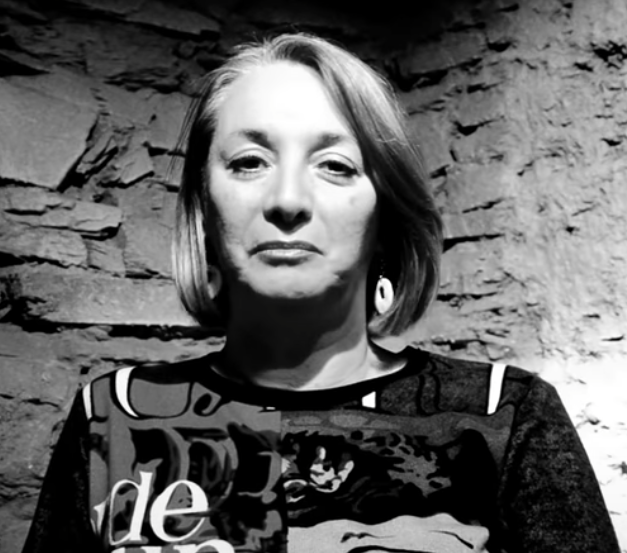
- Born: 1963 (age 62–63); Uruguay
- Occupation: Actress
- Spouses: Sergio Lazzo; Massimo Tenuta
- Children: 1
- Awards: Florencio Award; Fraternity Award

Alicia Alfonso (born 1963) is a Uruguayan actress.

She is associated with the Teatro El Galpón in Montevideo, and has been noted for her roles in productions such as Tóxico, Horror en Coronel Suárez, Éxtasis, and El país de las cercanías II.

In 2010 she received the Florencio Award for best supporting actress, and in 2015 the Fraternity Award, given by the Uruguayan branch of B'nai B'rith.
