= Pablo Dabezies =

Uruguayan Roman Catholic priest (1940–2021)

Pablo Bernardo Dabezies Antía, also known as Paul Dabezies (6 July 1940 – 28 August 2021) was a Uruguayan theologian and Roman Catholic priest.

== Selected works ==
- Las religiones en el Uruguay: algunas aproximaciones (in Spanish). Montevideo: La Gotera. 2004. ISBN 978-9974-7815-8-0. (with Teresa Porzecanski, Gerardo Caetano, and other authors)
- No se amolden al tiempo presente: las relaciones Iglesia-sociedad en los documentos de la Conferencia Episcopal del Uruguay (1965-1985) (in Spanish). Montevideo: OBSUR: Facultad de Teologia del Uruguay Mons. Mariano Soler. 2009.
