= Ramón Mérica =

Ramón Mérica (Salto Department, 6 June 1945 - 3 December 2010) was a Uruguayan journalist and author.

He interviewed prominent figures such as Carlos Monzón, Fernando Morena, and Pablo Neruda. He was known for his narrative journalism, featuring profiles and in-depth features. He understood that behind every person there is a story, and behind every story, a truth that resists being told.

He was awarded the Premio Alas in 2002, alongside Celia Roca, Susana Gutman, Beatriz Flores Silva, and Antonio Larreta.

== Works ==
- Agonistas y protagonistas
