= Breadcrumbs (film) =

2016 film

- Promotional release poster
- Directed by: Manane Rodríguez
- Written by: Xavier Bermúdez and Manane Rodríguez
- Produced by: Xamalú Filmes; RCI Producciones
- Starring: Cecilia Roth; Justina Bustos; María Pujalte; Margarita Musto; Stefanía Crocce; Sonia Méndez; Nuria Fló; Patxi Bisquert; Sergio Quintana; Ernesto Chao; María Vidal; Artur Trillo
- Cinematography: Diego Romero Suárez-Llanos
- Edited by: Sandra Sánchez
- Release date: 14 August 2016
- Running time: 109 minutes
- Countries: Spain; Uruguay
- Language: Spanish

Breadcrumbs (Spanish: Migas de pan) is a 2016 Spanish-Uruguayan drama film directed by Manane Rodríguez, starring Cecilia Roth and Justina Bustos. It was selected as the Uruguayan entry for the Best Foreign Language Film at the 89th Academy Awards but it was not nominated. It was selected by Uruguay to compete for the Oscar 2017 to Best non-English speaking film.

== Plot ==
The young Liliana Pereira (Justina Bustos), in Montevideo, a university student and mother of a baby, participates in student struggles against the civic-military dictatorship in Uruguay. Together with other women, she is kidnapped, locked up and tortured, and dispossessed of her son's parental rights. Mutual support with her confinement partners strengthens and accompanies her. After years of exile in Spain, and upon learning that she will be a grandmother, Liliana Pereira (Cecilia Roth) decides to return to Uruguay to participate with her ex-companions in denouncing the hell suffered in her youth and to recover the sentimental ties with her son.

== Cast ==
- Cecilia Roth as Liliana Pereira
- Justina Bustos as Liliana Pereira
- María Pujalte
- Margarita Musto
- Patxi Bisquert
- Ernesto Chao
- Quique Fernández
- Andrea Davidovics
- Ignacio Cawen
- Stefanía Crocce
- Sonia Méndez
- Nuria Fló
- Sergio Quintana
- María Vidal
- Artur Trillo

== See also ==
- List of submissions to the 89th Academy Awards for Best Foreign Language Film
- List of Uruguayan submissions for the Academy Award for Best Foreign Language Film
