= Álvaro Amengual =

Uruguayan artist and educator (born 1957)

- Born: 27 December 1957 (age 68); Montevideo, Uruguay
- Education: State University of New York at Purchase
- Occupations: Visual artist, illustrator, educator
- Known for: Drawing, painting, engraving, illustration

Álvaro Amengual (born 27 December 1957, Montevideo) is a Uruguayan visual artist, illustrator, and educator. His work includes drawing, painting, engraving, and illustration. Since the late 1970s he has participated in numerous exhibitions in Uruguay and abroad, and his works are held in museum collections in Uruguay and other countries.

== Early life and education ==
Amengual was born in Montevideo, Uruguay, on 27 December 1957. In 1977 he began studying at the San Francisco Art Institute, where he trained in drawing and painting under Clever Lara and studied sculpture with Freddie Faux.

In 1986 he took part in a metal engraving course organized by the Museo Nacional de Artes Visuales and taught by David Finkbeiner of State University of New York at Purchase. The following year he attended a lithography course organized by the Montevideo Engraving Club and led by architect Álvaro Cármenes.

== Career ==
Amengual began working as an illustrator in 1986. His drawings and illustrations appeared in several Uruguayan publications, including the weeklies Alternativa, Zeta, and Sobretodo, as well as the newspaper El Día.

He has exhibited regularly since 1977, taking part in more than fifty solo and group exhibitions. His exhibitions have included presentations of drawings and watercolors in cultural venues across Uruguay, including shows in Trinidad and other cities.

Alongside his artistic practice, Amengual has worked as an educator. Between 1991 and 1998 he taught in the workshop of Clever Lara. From 1993 to 1999 he collaborated with the Uruguayan Ministry of Education and Culture in the program “Talleres del Interior”, directing workshops in Trinidad and Durazno.

Since 1997 he has taught in his own studio, and from 1998 he has been a professor at the Faculty of Communication and Design of the Universidad ORT Uruguay.

== Collections ==
Works by Amengual are included in several public collections, including:

- Museo Nacional de Artes Visuales, Montevideo
- Museo Juan Manuel Blanes, Montevideo
- Museo Municipal de San Fernando, Maldonado
- Museo de la Municipalidad de Miraflores, Lima, Peru

== Awards ==
Amengual has received awards in several Uruguayan art competitions, including prizes at the Salón Municipal de Artes Plásticas during the 1980s.

In 2007 he received the Fraternity Award “Cr. Máximo Brenner”, awarded by B'nai B'rith Uruguay.
