= Germán Rama =

Uruguayan historian and writer

- Born: Rama; 11 August 1932; Montevideo, Uruguay
- Died: 27 December 2020 (aged 88); Montevideo, Uruguay
- Education: Instituto de Profesores Artigas
- Occupations: Professor, Writer

Germán Rama (11 August 1932 – 27 December 2020) was a Uruguayan writer and professor of history.

== Biography ==
Germán Rama was born in Montevideo. In 1950, after completing his secondary education and studying architecture for two years, he enrolled in the Artigas Institute of History Professors (IPA). He was then selected to join the Instituto de Profesores Artigas. He held the position of Director of the Central Board of Directors at the National Administration of Public Education (Codice) between 1995 and 2000.

A critic of education programs based on specific subjects, Rama said, "It does not make sense that there are subjects called Physics, Chemistry, and Biology and there are none called Science. It was necessary to have completed secondary school to be able to join University. But this is no longer a requirement." He implemented the Pilot Plan, which was part of the Education Reform Plan 96 that generated criticism from teachers and students in Uruguay. In 2011, former President José Mujica, on his radio program Habla el Presidente, praised the educational reform initiated by Rama.

Rama died on 27 December 2020 at the age of 88 in Montevideo.

== Books ==
- Grupos sociales y enseñanza secundaria (1968)
- La educación popular en América Latina (1984)
- Educación, participación y estilos de desarrollo en América Latina
- Carrera de los maestros en América Latina (1985)
- Los jóvenes de Uruguay: esos desconocidos: análisis de la Encuesta Nacional de Juventud de la Dirección General de Estadísticas y Censo (1991)
- ¿Aprenden los estudiantes en el ciclo básico de educación media? (1992)
- Qué aprenden y quiénes aprenden en las escuelas de Uruguay: los contextos sociales e institucionales de éxitos y fracasos (1992).
