= Hugo Longa =

Uruguayan painter (1934–2009)

- Born: Hugo Longa; June 4, 1934; Montevideo, Uruguay
- Died: December 2, 2009 (aged 75); Montevideo, Uruguay
- Education: National School of Fine Arts (Escuela Nacional de Bellas Artes), Montevideo
- Known for: Painting, printmaking, Pop Art
- Notable work: Figurative paintings, Pop Art pieces, Political satire series
- Style: Figurative, Pop Art
- Movement: Pop Art, Modernism

Hugo Longa (June 4, 1934 – December 2, 2009) was a Uruguayan visual artist known for his contributions to Pop Art and figurative painting in Uruguay. His works often explored themes of sensuality, politics, and social critique, making him one of the key figures in Uruguayan art during the 1960s and beyond.

== Early life and education ==
Hugo Longa was born on June 4, 1934, in Montevideo, Uruguay. From an early age, he showed a strong interest in art and design, leading him to pursue formal training at the National School of Fine Arts (Escuela Nacional de Bellas Artes) in Montevideo. Under the guidance of prominent Uruguayan artists, Longa developed his skills in painting, printmaking, and mixed-media art, which would later define his career.

== Artistic career ==
Longa's work gained recognition in the 1960s, a period marked by political and social upheaval in Uruguay. His style was strongly influenced by Pop Art, incorporating elements of graphic design, advertising aesthetics, and mass culture imagery. He became known for his bold use of color and his ability to blend sensuality with political commentary.

One of his notable artistic approaches was the deconstruction of the human figure, where he reimagined conventional representations of the body in fragmented and abstract forms. This technique placed him at the forefront of modernist movements in Latin America.

== Exhibitions and Recognition ==
Hugo Longa's work was exhibited in numerous national and international galleries and museums, including the National Museum of Visual Arts (Museo Nacional de Artes Visuales - MNAV) in Montevideo. He was also featured in major group exhibitions showcasing Latin American Pop Art, alongside other influential Uruguayan artists.

His participation in Los 60 y el Pop: Política y Sensualidad (2011) underscored his role in the development of political and erotic themes within Uruguayan Pop Art. His artworks from the 1960s reflected the changing social dynamics and countercultural movements of the time, making him a critical figure in Latin American modernism.

== Themes and Style ==
Longa’s artistic themes revolved around:

- The human body and sensuality: Many of his works explored the sensual and erotic aspects of human existence, often portraying figures with exaggerated forms.
- Political and social critique: Like many Latin American artists of his time, he used satirical and subversive imagery to critique political structures.
- Pop Art influences: His works incorporated bold colors, high-contrast imagery, and elements of advertising and mass media to create striking compositions.

== Later life and legacy ==
Despite the decline of Pop Art's global dominance, Longa continued producing artwork throughout his life. He remained an active contributor to Uruguay’s artistic community, influencing younger generations of artists. His works are now part of the permanent collection at the MNAV, ensuring his legacy within Uruguayan art history.

Hugo Longa died on December 2, 2009, leaving behind a rich artistic legacy that continues to be studied and celebrated in Uruguay and beyond.

== Selected works ==
Some of Longa’s notable works include:

- Untitled (1960s Pop Art piece) – Exploring consumer culture and eroticism
- Political Satire Series – Commenting on Uruguay’s shifting political landscape
- Figurative Abstractions – Experimenting with the human form through deconstruction
