= Héctor Manuel Vidal =

Uruguayan theatre director

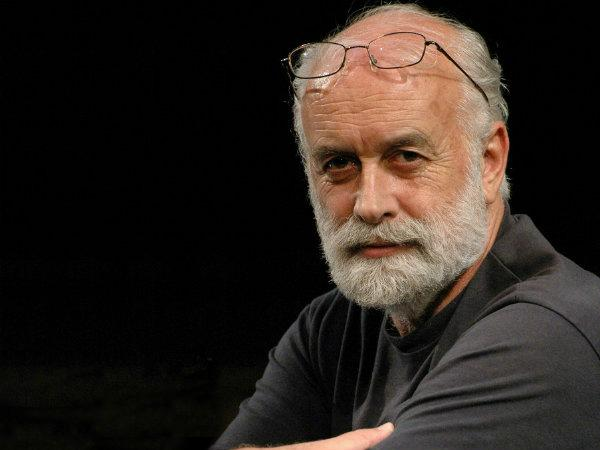
- Born: 26 August 1943; Las Piedras, Uruguay
- Died: 12 January 2014 (aged 70); Montevideo, Uruguay
- Occupation: Theater director
- Spouse: Margarita Musto
- Children: María Vidal Musto
- Awards: Premio Florencio; Fraternity Award

Héctor Manuel Vidal (26 August 1943 – 12 January 2014) was a Uruguayan theater director.

== Biography ==
Héctor Manuel Vidal's training in stage arts began at the school of the group Club de Teatro, in which he performed in over 40 plays. He made his debut as an actor under the direction of Antonio Larreta in Chips with Everything, by the English playwright Arnold Wesker. His first experience as a director was in 1969 with La víspera del degüello, by the Chilean Jorge Díaz, staged internally. His premiere as a director before the public was in 1974 at the Teatro El Tinglado, with Woyzeck by Georg Büchner.

Two of his plays, Rhinoceros by Eugène Ionesco and Life of Galileo by Bertolt Brecht (1983), premiered during the 1973-1985 civic-military dictatorship. From these premieres, and given their topics, theater critics recognized Vidal's ability to choose the most appropriate works and themes for the socio-political context of his country. Another important work in his career as a theater director was Breaking the Code by Hugh Whitemore, about the life of Alan Turing, with more than 300 performances.

Other plays included Don Mendo's Revenche by Pedro Muñoz Seca, Inodoro Pereyra (The Renegade) by Roberto Fontanarrosa, No Man's Land by Harold Pinter, A Respectable Wedding by Bertolt Brecht, and La Gatomaquia by Lope de Vega. In his more than four decades as a theater director, he also directed works by Ramón del Valle-Inclán, Maurice Maeterlinck, Shakespeare, Henry Miller, and Jean-Luc Lagarce, among others.

Vidal joined the Communist Party in 1961. Before the 1973 coup d'état he wrote for the newspaper El Popular, a party press organ, and its political humor supplement Misia Dura. He worked at Banco de la República until he resigned to dedicate himself to the theater. Years later he left the party.

He was general and artistic director of the Comedia Nacional twice – from 1996 to 1998 and from 2001 to 2006. In 2006 he resigned due to disagreements with the Intendancy of Montevideo's Department of Culture.

He was the husband of actress and theater director Margarita Musto. His daughter María Vidal Musto is a theatrical actress.

== Awards ==
- 1982 – Florencio Award for Life of Galileo
- 1985 – Costa Rica's National Prize for Theater
- 1986 – Florencio Award for A Respectable Wedding
- 1988 – Fraternity Award from B'nai B'rith Uruguay
- 1994 – Florencio Award for Breaking the Code
