= Teresa Porzecanski =

Uruguayan anthropologist and writer (born 5 May 1945)

- Born: Teresa Porzecanski Cohen; May 5, 1945 (age 81); Montevideo, Uruguay
- Education: Universidad de la República
- Occupations: anthropologist, writer, professor
- Awards: Premio Bartolomé Hidalgo; Premio Morosolli; Premio Alas

Teresa Porzecanski Cohen (born May 5, 1945) is a Uruguayan anthropologist, writer and academic.

== Biography ==
Porzecanski Cohen was born and raised in Montevideo to a Jewish family. Her father was an Ashkenazi from Liepāja, Latvia and her mother, a Sephardic from Syria. She graduated from the University of the Republic with a degree in social work.

Her works have included a focus on the Jewish communities of Uruguay, afrodescendant minorities, as well as prejudice and ethnic issues. She has been is a professor and academic at the Catholic University of Uruguay, the Latin American Center for Human Economy and the University of the Republic. From 1978-1981, she collected oral histories of Jewish immigrants which was published as Life Stories of Jewish Immigrants to Uruguay in its first edition in Spanish in 1986. In a review for the American Jewish Archives, Alejandro Lilienthal called it a good introduction to the subject, outside of the transcriptions of the oral histories.

Her fiction is part of a tradition of works exploring identities and migration maladjustments, prejudice against minorities, and women interior worlds.

In 1992, she received a Guggenheim Fellowship, during which she studied the Sephardim and rabbinic lore. She has also received a Fulbright scholarship. as well as a Rockefeller Residency Grant in Bellagio, Italy, to write her fiction. She received five awards by the Ministry of Education of Uruguay, two awards by the Municipality of Montevideo, the Critics Award Bartolomé Hidalgo (1995) and the Morosoli Award for Literature (2004).

== Selected works ==
=== Fiction ===
- 1967, The Riddle and other stories (El acertijo y otros cuentos)
- 1979, Constructions (Construcciones)
- 1981, Sun Inventions (Invención de los soles)
- 1986, An Erotic Novel (Una novela erótica)
- 1989, Messiah in Montevideo (Mesías en Montevideo)
- 1989, Breath is a Forge (La respiración es una fragua)
- 1994, Perfumes of Cartaghe (Perfumes de Cartago)
- 1996, The skin of the soul (La piel del alma)
- 2002, Fleeting happiness (Felicidades fugaces)

=== Nonfiction ===
- 1986, Life Stories of Jewish Immigrants to Uruguay (La vida empezó acá : inmigrantes judíos al Uruguay : historias de vida y perspectiva antropológica de la conformación de la comunidad judía uruguaya, contrastes culturales y procesos de enculturación) (2nd ed, 2005)
- 2004, Las religiones en el Uruguay: algunas aproximaciones (in Spanish). Montevideo: La Gotera. 2004. ISBN 978-9974-7815-8-0. (with Pablo Dabezies, Gerardo Caetano, and other authors).
