= Teatro El Galpón =

Theatre in Montevideo, Uruguay

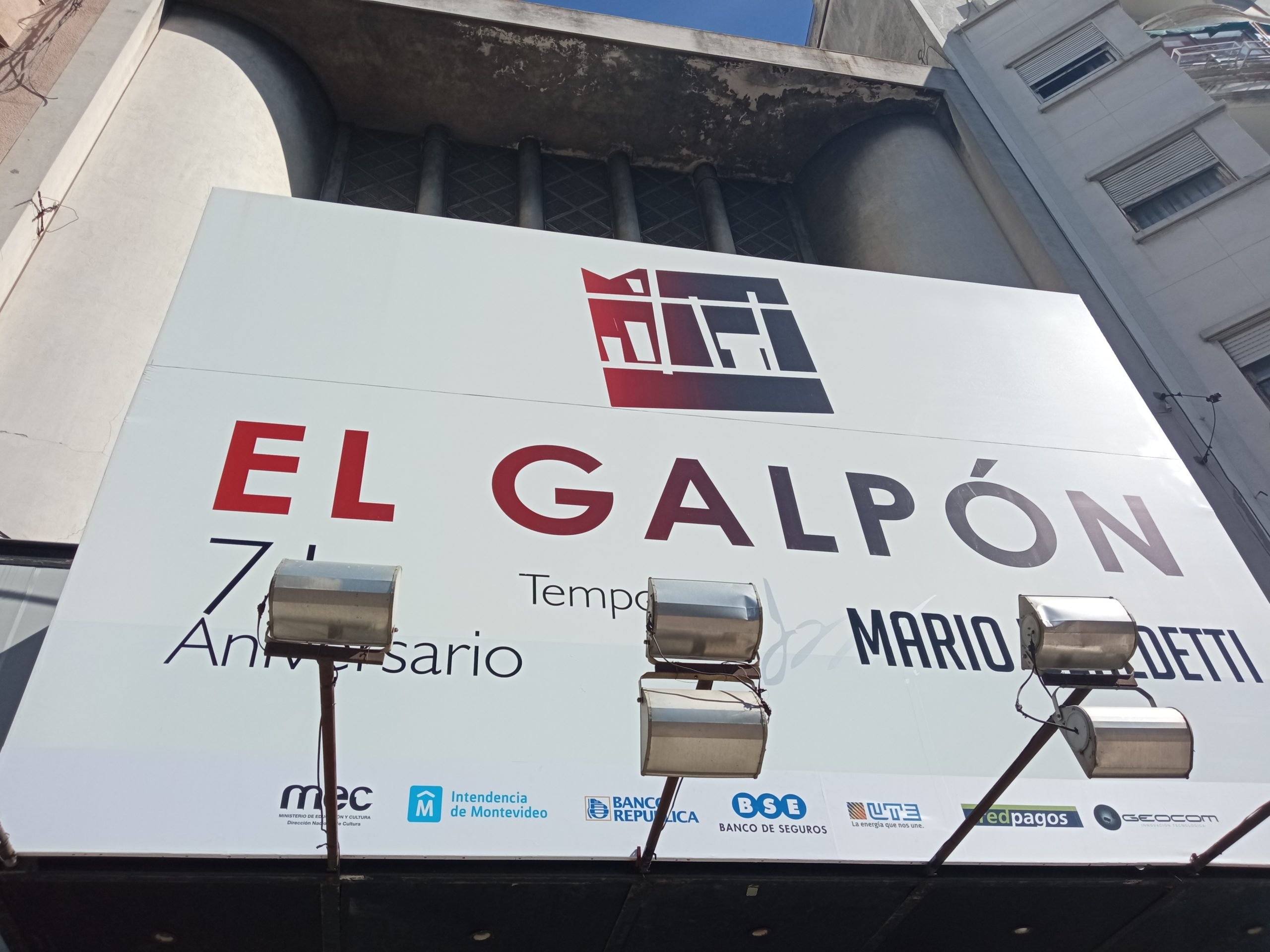
- Teatro El Galpón in 2020
- Interactive map of Teatro El Galpón
- Address: 1618 18 de Julio Avenue; Montevideo; Uruguay
- Coordinates: 34°54′15″S 56°10′52″W
- Capacity: 800

Construction
- Opened: 2 September 1949; 76 years ago

Website
- www.teatroelgalpon.org.uy

The Teatro El Galpón is a theatre located in the Cordón neighbourhood of Montevideo, Uruguay. Founded in 1949 by a group of independent actors, it also operates as a cultural centre, a school of dramatic arts and a television studios.

== History ==
Teatro El Galpón was founded in September 1949 as an independent theatre company. In 1951, it opened its first permanent venue in a building on Mercedes Street, and in 1964, through donations and fundraising campaigns, it acquired the former Gran Palace Cinema building on 18 de Julio Avenue, which was subsequently converted into a theatre. The new venue was inaugurated on 9 January 1969 with a production of Mr Puntila and His Man Matti by Bertolt Brecht, directed by César Campodónico.

On 7 May 1976, during Uruguay’s civic–military dictatorship, the theatre was closed and its assets were confiscated. From 1976 to 1984, the company toured several countries in Latin America and Europe under the name El Galpón en el Exilio. With the country’s return to democracy in 1985, the institution reopened.
