= Dolores Castillo =

Dolores Castillo (Montevideo, Uruguay, 7 Jun 1920 - 24 Jan 1991) was a Uruguayan journalist, philosophy professor, and trade union activist.

== Biography ==
Castillo studied at the Universidad de Mujeres and became a philosophy professor. In 1949, together with a group of teachers, she founded the Instituto de Profesores Artigas, directed by Dr. Antonio Grompone, with the objective of providing specialized pedagogical and technical training for enseñanza secundaria teachers. Enseñanza secundaria or 'secondary education' is comparable to high school in the United States though teachers are required to complete an education similar to a master's degree.

Later, in 1956, Dolores went on to teach at the Instituto Alfredo Vázquez Acevedo (IAVA), becoming the only female professor at the institution. She was actively engaged in the teachers' union and a member of Zonta International, an international organization whose objective is to empower women by providing scholarships, education, and improve conditions in the workplace.

Between the years 1958 and 1983, Castillo worked as a journalist for the national newspaper El Diario as well as a columnist for their supplemental publication, La Mañana. Dolores was recognized as an outstanding journalist who worked in a profession that, in her time, was perceived as typically masculine. In 1981 she founded the Association of Women Journalists of Uruguay (AMPU).

== Death ==
Dolores died in 1991, survived by her two sons and daughter.
