= Margarita Xirgu Multidisciplinary School of Dramatic Art =

Drama school in Montevideo, Uruguay

Multidisciplinary School of Dramatic Arts
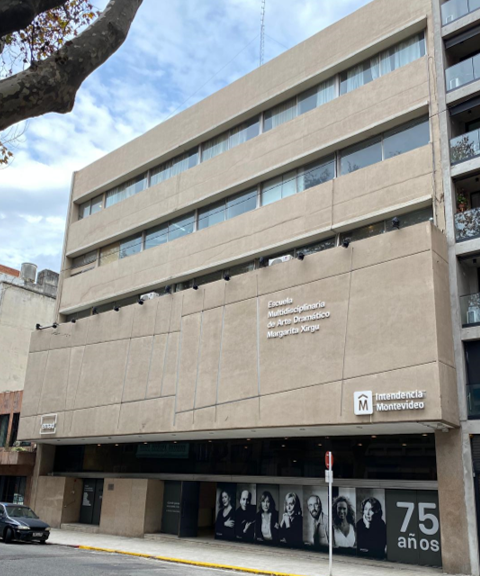
- School building in 2025
- Other name: EMAD
- Type: Public drama school
- Established: 1949
- Art director: Laura Pouso (2023-2025)
- Academic staff: 40
- Location: 1084 Canelones St., Montevideo, Uruguay; 34.908853°S 56.192577°W
- Campus: Urban
- Website: www.emad.edu.uy

The Escuela Multidisciplinaria de Arte Dramático Margarita Xirgu (EMAD) (Spanish for 'Margarita Xirgu Multidisciplinary School of Dramatic Arts') is a public drama school in Montevideo, Uruguay. The institute offers a degree in acting and theater design, as well as a teaching degree in theater and body expression, and a technical degree in dramaturgy.

Founded in 1949, it is the first drama school in the country and the only public. In 2010, it was named in honor of the Spanish actress Margarita Xirgu who developed part of her career in Uruguay. For its first 50 years, the school operated in the east wing of the Solís Theatre and after operating in different locations, in 2024 it was established in Central Montevideo.

== History ==
One of the oldest drama schools in the Hispanic world, the Municipal School of Dramatic Art was founded on November 14, 1949, by the playwright and politician, Justino Zavala Muñiz and the Spanish actress Margarita Xirgu, who was exiled in Uruguay. As head of the theater commission of the Intendancy of Montevideo, the former had created the Comedia Nacional, an official stable theater ensemble, and the Municipal School of Music two years earlier. Its first home was the east wing of the Solís Theatre in Montevideo, a place it shared with the Comedia Nacional.

Its first artistic director was Margarita Xirgu, who was in office until 1957. In the 1970s, the theatrical set design course began to be taught, under the supervision of the set designer Osvaldo Reyno.

In 1998, due to the renovations carried out at the Solís Theatre, the EMAD was temporarily housed in the Astral Theatre of the Zhitlovsky Israelite Association, in the Palermo neighborhood. Two years later, it moved to the Alliance Française building in the central business district. Starting in 2001 and in the following years, the school moved several times, until settling in its current home, on Mercedes Street in the Cordón neighborhood.

In July 2013, the school became associated with the National School of Fine Arts Institute of the Faculty of Arts of the University of the Republic, and in 2016 a technical degree in dramaturgy began to be taught in agreement with the Faculty of Humanities and Educational Sciences of the same university.

In 2010, by resolution of the Intendancy of Montevideo, the school was renamed the Margarita Xirgu Montevidean School of Dramatic Art, retaining the acronym "EMAD". However, a year later, it was renamed the Margarita Xirgu Multidisciplinary School of Dramatic Art, again retaining the acronym.

In late 2023, it was announced that the institute would be moved again. In January 2024, the purchase of the headquarters building of the Central Israelite Committee of Uruguay and the Synagogue of the Jewish Community to house the school facilities was confirmed. The new location opened on May 27, 2024.

== Notable alumni ==
- Roxana Blanco
- Mateo Chiarino
- Sancho Gracia
- Estela Medina
- María Mendive
- Margarita Musto
- Walter Reyno
- Alfonso Tort
- Omar Varela
- Enzo Vogrincic
