= Pablo Casacuberta =

Uruguayan writer

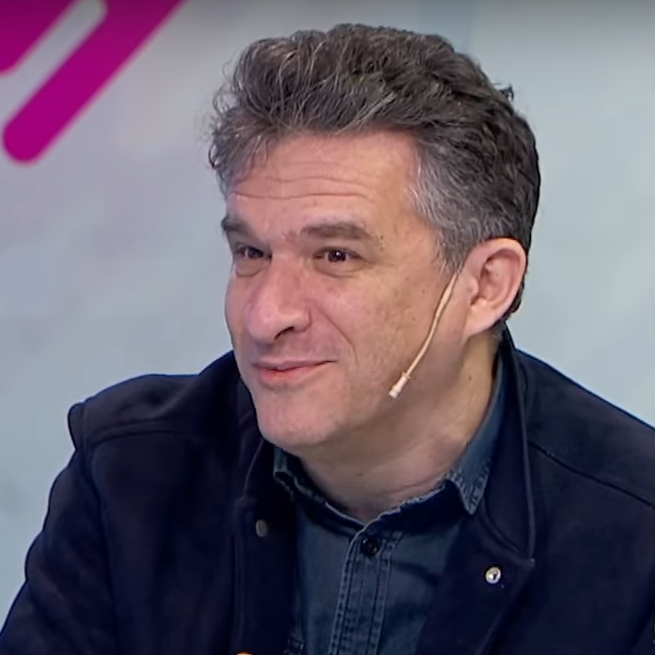
Image of Pablo Casacuberta

Pablo Casacuberta (born Montevideo, 1969) is a Uruguayan writer and visual artist. He has published seven works of fiction, and won the Uruguayan National Literature Prize in 1996 and in 2019. In 2007, he was chosen as one of the 39 most promising young writers in Latin America under the rubric of Bogotá39. His work has been translated into French, Italian and Croatian.

Casacuberta trained as an artist in Sheffield, and has exhibited in New York, Barcelona, Buenos Aires, Yokohama, and Venice. He started his career as a graphic designer before moving to TV and film. He has received a Clio award, been nominated for a Latin Grammy, and directed second unit scenes for renowned directors like Alfonso Cuarón, Alejandro González Iñárritu, and Terrence Malick. He co-directed an experimental feature film, “Another George” (1998) in collaboration with Yukihiko Goto. He is also a recorded musician, releasing an album of instrumental compositions in 2014, titled Historia Natural de la Belleza y otras piezas bailables.

== Awards ==
- 1990: Concurso para Logotipo de la 1.ª Feria Nacional de Artesanías (with Ombú).
