= Elena Zuasti =

Uruguayan stage actress and comedian

- Born: Elena Zuasti; May 18, 1935; Montevideo, Uruguay
- Died: April 8, 2011 (aged 75); Montevideo, Uruguay
- Occupations: Actress, teacher

Elena Zuasti (May 18, 1935 – April 8, 2011) was a Uruguayan stage actress and comedian.

== Biography ==
Zuasti was born in Montevideo in 1935. She graduated twenty years later from the Dramatic Art School and managed to enter the National Comedy, where she remained until 1976. She also taught stage performance for many decades, combining the teaching with her work as an actress. She worked, among other places, at the Faustan Italy Theater Company (in Spanish, Compañía Teatral Italia Fausta) and at Comediantes.com, which belongs to the Uruguay-United States Alliance.

She was one of the first actresses to perform on Uruguayan radio programs, introducing a practice which was unpopular in the country. She also adapted many European plays, some of which included Irish playwright Samuel Beckett's plays.

Zuasti was also a television and film actress. Some of her featured projects include El año del dragón, A cara o cruz and La espera (2002).

She died on April 8, 2011, probably following a heart attack while performing her character Martiniana on stage for the play Barranca abajo «Downhill». Her remains are buried at Cementerio del Buceo, Montevideo.

== Filmography ==
- El ojo en la nuca (2001)
- La espera (2002)
- Uruguayos campeones (2004)
