= Jorge Medina Vidal =

Uruguayan poet literary critic (1925–2008)

- Born: March 4, 1925; Uruguay, Montevideo
- Died: June 17, 2008 (aged 83); Uruguay, Montevideo
- Occupations: poet, educator, literary critic

Jorge Medina Vidal (1925 in Montevideo – 2008) was a Uruguayan poet, educator and literary critic.

He received his diploma at the Department of Humanities and Sciences of the Universidad de la República. As a member of that school, and of the Artigas Teachers' Institute, he taught at the secondary level.

== Works ==
- Cinco sitios de poesía (1951)
- Para el tiempo que vivo (1955)
- Las Puertas (1962)
- Por modo extraño (1963)
- Las Terrazas (1964)
- Harpya destructor (1969)
- Situación anómala (1977)
- Poemas, poemenos (1981)
- Transparences (1987, ed. Eché, Toulouse - France) Bilingual poems authored with the French poet, Monique Ruffié de Saint-Blancat
