= Eduardo Gilardoni =

Uruguayan composer and pianist (1935–2022)

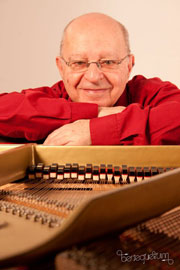
- Born: 9 November 1935; Conchillas, Uruguay
- Died: 28 March 2022 (aged 86)
- Occupation(s): Composer, pianist, harpsichordist, vocal coach

Eduardo Gilardoni (9 November 1935 – 28 March 2022) was a Uruguayan composer, pianist, harpsichordist and vocal coach.

== Life and career ==
Born in Conchillas, Uruguay, Gilardoni started his piano studies at the Franz Liszt Conservatory in Montevideo with Esther Giucci, composition with Carlos Giucci and Héctor Tosar and continued his piano studies with Santiago Baranda Reyes, Sara Bourdillion, Hugo Balzo and Armano Bascans.

In 1964 he moved to Barcelona on a scholarship from the Institute of Hispanic Culture and studied with the singer Conchita Badia, the pianist Alicia de Larrocha and composers Joaquin Nin and Federico Mompou.

When he returned to Uruguay in 1966 he became a harpsichord professor at the Anglo Institute, a position he held for eighteen years. Since then he became a much sought after collaborative pianist with the top singers of Uruguay. From 1995 to 2005 he was a visiting artist at the College of Charleston.

In 2006 he represented Uruguay in the Song Festival at the University of Central Arkansas. He has performed and presented his works in concerts and festivals in Brazil, Peru, Argentina, Spain, the United States and Bolivia.

Three compact discs with his works have been released and the Ministry of Education and Culture of Uruguay published two volumes of his complete works for piano, voice and chamber music.

Gilardoni died on 28 March 2022, at the age of 86.
