= Carlos Aguilera (theater director) =

Uruguayan theater director

- Born: 1 January 1945; Montevideo, Uruguay
- Died: 19 May 2009 (aged 64); Montevideo, Uruguay
- Occupation: Theater director
- Years active: 1968–2009

Carlos Aguilera (1 January 1945 – 19 May 2009) was a Uruguayan theater teacher and director. He made his debut in working at El Galpón with the works: Señora Carrar's Rifles, The Zoo Story, and Los de la Mesa, with Los Papeleros by Isidora Aguirre at the Theater Club. He died when he was in charge of directing El Hombre Que Queria Volar by Carlos Manuel Varela on May 19, 2009.

== Biography ==
Carlos Aguilera studied theater with Elena Zuasti and José Estruch at the Municipal House of Culture, and with Atilio J. Costa in La Máscara. Responsible for 100 stagings, he worked with almost all the theater groups in Uruguay, including the Comedia Nacional, El Galpón Theater, the Circular, and the La Gaviota Theater.

His debut as a theater director came in 1968 with three works at El Galpón: Señora Carrar's Rifles by Bertolt Brecht, The Zoo Story by Edward Albee and Los de la Mesa 10 by Osvaldo Dragún; and with Los papeleros by Isidora Aguirre at the Theater Club. He directed works by García Lorca, Ibsen, Arthur Miller, Florencio Sánchez, Jorge Denevi, Carlos Gorostiza, Griselda Gambaro, Julio César Castro, and others. He contributed to the dissemination of the work of playwrights such as Carlos Manuel Varela, Alvaro Ahunchain, Dino Armas, and Ricardo Prieto.

Aguilera was nominated for the 1998 Florencio Award in the Best Show and Direction categories for El Amateur by Mauricio Dayub, a play shown in the Circular Theater. He won the Florencio Award several times and received the International Theater Prize from UNESCO.

Beginning in 1983, he had a career of more than 20 years in Paraguay as a theater teacher and director, linked in particular to the Harlequin Theater where he put on more than 40 productions. There, he directed works by Shakespeare, Molière, Anton Chekhov, García Lorca, Arthur Miller, Tennessee Williams, Brecht, etc., as well as Paraguayan and other Latin American authors.

He was a theater teacher in several cities of the interior (Canelones, Colonia, Durazno, Maldonado, Minas, San José) and in the 1990s he formed the Theater Studies Institute. He was the artistic director of the Casa de Comedias del Uruguay of the Ministry of Education and Culture. He directed the Municipal Comedy and the Municipal School of Dramatic Art in San José and, beginning in 1986, he was itinerant director of Colonia Department.

During his last months of life he worked as a theater teacher at the Club Biguá de Villa Biarritz and prepared the play The Price by Arthur Miller at the El Galpón Theater. His death occurred while he was in charge of the direction of El hombre que quería volar by Carlos Manuel Varela, at Espacio Teatro.
