= César Campodónico =

Uruguayan actor

César Campodónico (1929–2005) was an Uruguayan actor.
