= Omar Varela =

Uruguayan actor and playwright (1957–2022)

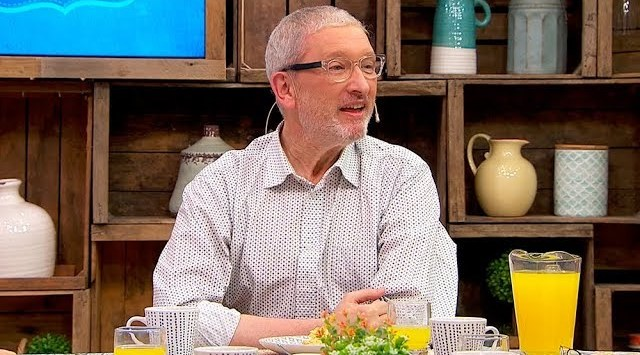
- Varela in 2019
- Born: 15 October 1957; Montevideo, Uruguay
- Died: 6 December 2022 (aged 65)
- Education: Margarita Xirgu Multidisciplinary School of Dramatic Art
- Occupations: Actor, playwright, theater director, teacher
- Awards: Iris Award; Wings Award

Omar Varela (15 October 1957 – 6 December 2022) was a Uruguayan actor, director, playwright, and teacher, the founder of the theater company Italia Fausta.

== Biography ==
Omar Varela settled in Brazil, after having been part of the stable cast of the Comedia Nacional. He graduated from the Margarita Xirgu Multidisciplinary School of Dramatic Art in Montevideo. He directed plays and musicals such as Mi bella dama, Ópera do Malandro, and ¿Quién le teme a Italia Fausta? (with Petru Valensky, this masterpiece ran for more than 10 years). In addition, he was one of the founding pioneers of children's theater in Uruguay. He was a juror on the Teledoce talent show Yo me llamo during its 2014 and 2015 seasons.

Varela won the Iris Award in 2003.

Varela died from complications of Parkinson's disease on 6 December 2022, at the age of 65.
