= List of Uruguayan women writers =

This is a list of women writers who were born in Uruguay or whose writings are closely associated with that country.

== A ==
- María Abella de Ramírez (1863–1926), journal publisher, columnist, feminist
- Ethel Afamado (born 1940), poet, composer
- Gladys Afamado (1925–2024), poet, visual artist
- Delmira Agustini (1886–1914), acclaimed 20th century Latin-American poet
- Victoria Aihar (born 1978), author of erotic novels
- Marcelina Almeida (ca. 1830–1880), writer
- Claudia Amengual (born 1969), novelist, short story writer, essayist, educator, columnist
- Teresa Amy (1950–2017), teacher, poet, translator

== B ==
- Ana Barrios Camponovo (born 1961), writer, actress, and illustrator
- Lalo Barrubia (born 1967), poet and translator
- Carolina Bello (born 1983), writer
- Amanda Berenguer (1921–2010), poet, autobiographer
- Matilde Bianchi (1927–1991), writer
- Inés Bortagaray (born 1975), writer, screenwriter
- Virginia Brindis de Salas (1908–1958), poet, columnist

== C ==
- Esther de Cáceres (1903–1971), poet, educator
- Marta Canessa (born 1936), historian, academic writer
- Selva Casal (1927–2020), poet
- Adela Castell (1864–1926), essayist, poet, teacher
- Dorila Castell de Orozco (1845–1930), poet and teacher who wrote under the pseudonym Una Oriental
- Gladys Castelvecchi (1922–2008), poet, literature professor
- Maria Collazo (1884–1942) Educator & Journalist
- Marcia Collazo (born 1959), writer, teacher, lawyer
- Enriqueta Compte y Riqué (1866–1949), educator
- Helena Corbellini (born 1959), writer, literature professor
- Cecilia Curbelo (born 1975), journalist, columnist, screenwriter

== E ==
- Paula Einöder (born 1974), poet, novelist, educator
- Alicia Escardó (born 1963), writer, cultural manager
- Gloria Escomel (born 1941), Uruguayan-born Canadian journalist, novelist, short story writer
- María Esperanza Barrios (1892–1932), journalist, writer

== G ==
- Eloísa García Etchegoyhen (1921–1996), non-fiction writer, educator
- María Esther Gilio (1928–2011), journalist, writer, biographer, and lawyer
- Marosa di Giorgio (1932–2004), acclaimed poet, novelist
- Estela Golovchenko (born 1963), playwright

== I ==
- Suleika Ibáñez (1930–2013), writer, teacher, and translator
- Sara de Ibáñez (1909–1971), poet, literary critic, and educator
- Juana de Ibarbourou (1892–1979), popular poet, feminist

== L ==
- Sylvia Lago (born 1932), writer, teacher, literary critic
- Clotilde Luisi (1882–1969), lawyer, educator, translator, short story writer
- Luisa Luisi (1883–1940), poet, teacher, literary critic

== M ==
- Mirta Macedo (1939–2012), writer, social worker, human rights activist
- Circe Maia (born 1932), poet, essayist, translator, teacher
- Amparo Menendez-Carrion (born 1949), Uruguayan-Ecuadorian author, academic
- María de Montserrat (1913–1995), writer

== O ==
- Susana Olaondo (born 1953), writer and illustrator
- Gabriela Onetto (born 1963), writer, philosopher
- Rosalba Oxandabarat (1944–2023), journalist

== P ==
- Gladys Parentelli (born 1935), feminist theologian
- Mariana Percovich (born 1963), playwright, teacher, theater director
- Carina Perelli (born 1957), writer, political consultant
- Cristina Peri Rossi (born 1941), novelist, short story writer, poet, translator
- Amalia Polleri (1909–1996), poet, journalist, art critic
- Alicia Porro (1908–1983), poet
- Teresa Porzecanski (born 1945), anthropologist, novelist, short story writer, non-fiction writer
- Carmen Posadas (born 1953), best selling novelist, short story writer, children's writer
- Fanny Puyesky (1939–2010), writer, dramatist, lawyer

== R ==
- Mercedes Rein (1930–2006), dramatist, translator
- Sara Rey Álvarez (1894–1949), lawyer, writer, feminist
- Ana Ribeiro (born 1955), writer, historian, professor
- Alba Roballo (1910–1996), politician, poet
- Carolina de Robertis (born 1975), Uruguayan-American author, teacher of creative writing
- Cristina Rodríguez Cabral (born 1959), poet, researcher
- Silvia Rodríguez Villamil (1939–2003), historian, feminist, writer, activist
- Dora Isella Russell (1925–1990) poet, journalist

== S ==
- María Herminia Sabbia y Oribe (1883–1961), poet
- Beatriz Santos Arrascaeta (born 1947), narrative writer, historian, essayist
- Graciela Sapriza (born 1945), Uruguayan historian, educator
- Concepción Silva Belinzon (1903–1987), poet
- Susana Soca (1906–1959), poet
- Armonía Somers (1914–1994), novelist, short story writer, feminist
- Alcira Soust Scaffo (1924–1997), poet, teacher
- Michelle Suárez Bértora (1983–2022), transgender lawyer, politician, writer

== V ==
- María Eugenia Vaz Ferreira (1875–1924), poet, teacher
- Helen Velando (born 1961), young adult writer
- Idea Vilariño (1920–2009), poet, essayist, literary critic
- Ida Vitale (born 1923), prolific writer, poet, non-fiction writer, essayist

== Z ==
- Giselda Zani (1909–1975), Italian-born poet, short story writer, critic

== See also ==
- List of women writers
- List of Spanish-language authors
