= Aihar =

Aihar may refer to:

- Aihar, Raebareli, a village in India
- Aihar, Barisal, a village in Bangladesh
- Victoria Aihar, a Uruguayan author
