= Yo, Paco =

Book by Uruguayan journalist Mario Bardanca

- Author: Mario Bardanca
- Original title: Yo, Paco
- Language: Spanish
- Series: Mario Bardanca
- Subject: biography
- Genre: narrative
- Publisher: Editorial Sudamericana
- Publication date: 2007
- Publication place: Uruguay
- Pages: 272
- Awards: Premio Libro de Oro
- ISBN: 978-9974-8141-2-7
- OCLC: 184947174

Yo, Paco: Un antes y un después en el fútbol uruguayo (in English: I, Paco: : A before and after in Uruguayan football), is the first book by Uruguayan journalist Mario Bardanca. It was published by Editorial Sudamericana in 2007.

The book chronicles the career of Uruguayan Francisco Casal, from his first business venture to the formation of the so-called "Casal Group" and the Tenfield company. The book took the author approximately a year of writing and journalistic research to create. An interview with Paco Casal is included in the final chapter, entitled "Mano a mano con Paco".

Its first edition of 3 000 copies sold out quickly, which was considered a notable publishing success. In four months, more than 8 000 copies were sold. More than 11 500 books were sold, plus a special paperback edition of 2 000 copies. In 2007, it won the Premio Libro de Oro (Golden Book Award) from the Uruguayan Book Chamber for bestselling in its category.

== Literature ==
- 2010, La fiesta inolvidable by Tato López (ISBN 978-9974-98-131-7).
