= Afamado =

Afamado is a Spanish surname. Notable people with the surname include:

- Ethel Afamado (born 1940), Uruguayan composer, poet, guitarist, and singer-songwriter
- Gladys Afamado (1925–2024), Uruguayan visual artist, engraver, and poet
