= Maruja Pereyra =

Afro-Uruguayan journalist and feminist activist

- Occupation: Journalist, activist
- Spouse(s): Pilar Barrios

Maruja Pereyra or Pereira, later Maruja Pereyra Barrios (born 1906) was an Afro-Uruguayan journalist and feminist activist. She was active in the Afro-Uruguayan periodical Nuestra Raza, and the founder of Comité de Mujeres Negras por la paz y contra el fascismo, which has been called "the first Black women's political party".

== Life ==
Little is known of Pereyra's life. However, in the 1930s she and Iris Cabral were "the most visible, militant and outspoken" women to write for Nuestra Raza. The pair were elected delegates to the 1936 National Congress of Women. After Cabral's death in June 1936, Pereyra was active in the black political party Partido Autóctono Negro. Together with Maria Felina Díaz, Pereyra wrote a column "Pages For You" for the party's periodical, PAN, and tried to recruit women to political participation. She founded a female wing of the Partido Autóctono Negro, the sister organization known as the Comité de Mujeres Negras por la paz y contra el fascismo.

In 1937 she married the poet and fellow activist Pilar Barrios. After Partido Autóctono Negro was dissolved, she remained active with Nuestra Raza until it ceased publication in 1948. She later founded the Asociación de Empleadas Domésticas, a union for domestic workers, though it was hard for overworked domestic workers to find time to participate in the organization. She was still living in 1980.
