= Estadio Uno =

Uruguayan television program

- Genre: Sports
- Created by: Julio Sánchez Padilla
- Directed by: Julio Sánchez Padilla
- Presented by: Julio Sánchez Padilla
- Country of origin: Uruguay
- Original language: Spanish
- No. of seasons: 47

Production
- Producer: gabriel Fuentes - Axel Fucks
- Running time: 90 minutes
- Production company: Sifar S.A.

Original release
- Network: Televisión Nacional Uruguay
- Release: 5 June 1970 – 19 December 2017

Estadio Uno was a Uruguayan television program. It aired from 1970 to 2017 on Televisión Nacional Uruguay (TNU) Channel 5.

== History ==
Estadio Uno began as a football debate program, which dealt with sports, opinion, and cultural issues. Over time it came to cover basketball, cycling, athletics, the Olympic Games, and any sporting activity.

Led by series creator Julio Sánchez Padilla, a longstanding sports reporter, more than 90 journalists passed through its desk, such as Carlos Muñoz, Alberto Kesman, Víctor Hugo Morales, Juan Carlos Scelza, Rúben Casco, Eduardo Rivas, Ricardo Gabito, and Jorge da Silveira. Its final team comprised Sánchez Padilla, Silvia Pérez, Mario Bardanca, Axel Fucks, and Ariel Alsina.

The show featured exclusive interviews, documents, and all Uruguayan goals from 1978 to 1994 (the year in which their rights were sold). The program was also part of Monte Carlo TV, channel 4.

Julio Sánchez Padilla often used the phrase "the eight viewers of Estadio Uno", in reference to a report by a ratings agency, repeated by the newspaper El Día, saying that the program had 0.00001 of the total audience. That is to say that the Estadio Uno team was seen by eight people.

In 2013, TNU Channel 5 announced that Estadio Uno would be one of 14 projects to be continued in its new "associated production" mode.

In February 2016, Estadio Uno was broadcast from the Estadio Campeón del Siglo.

=== Awards and honors ===
Estadio Uno was the longest-running show on Uruguayan television, and on 14 January 2002, Julio Sánchez Padilla was recognized by Guinness World Records as the television director with the longest uninterrupted tenure.

The Uruguayan Post issued a stamp commemorating the program.

== Presenters ==
- Julio Sánchez Padilla
- Silvia Pérez
- Mario Bardanca
- Axel Fucks
- Ariel Alsina
- Carlos Muñoz
- Alberto Kesman
- Víctor Hugo Morales
- Juan Carlos Scelza
- Eduardo Rivas
- Ricardo Gabito
- Jorge da Silveira
- Atilio Garrido
- Franklin Morales
- Jorge Crosa
- Adolfo Oldoine
- Julio Folle Larreta
- Jorge Stewart
- Camilo Cauch
- Ariel Delbono
- Hugo Matteo
- Hugo "Lalo" Fernández
- Juan Gallardo
- Carlos Casco
- Enrique Yannuzzi

== Gallery ==
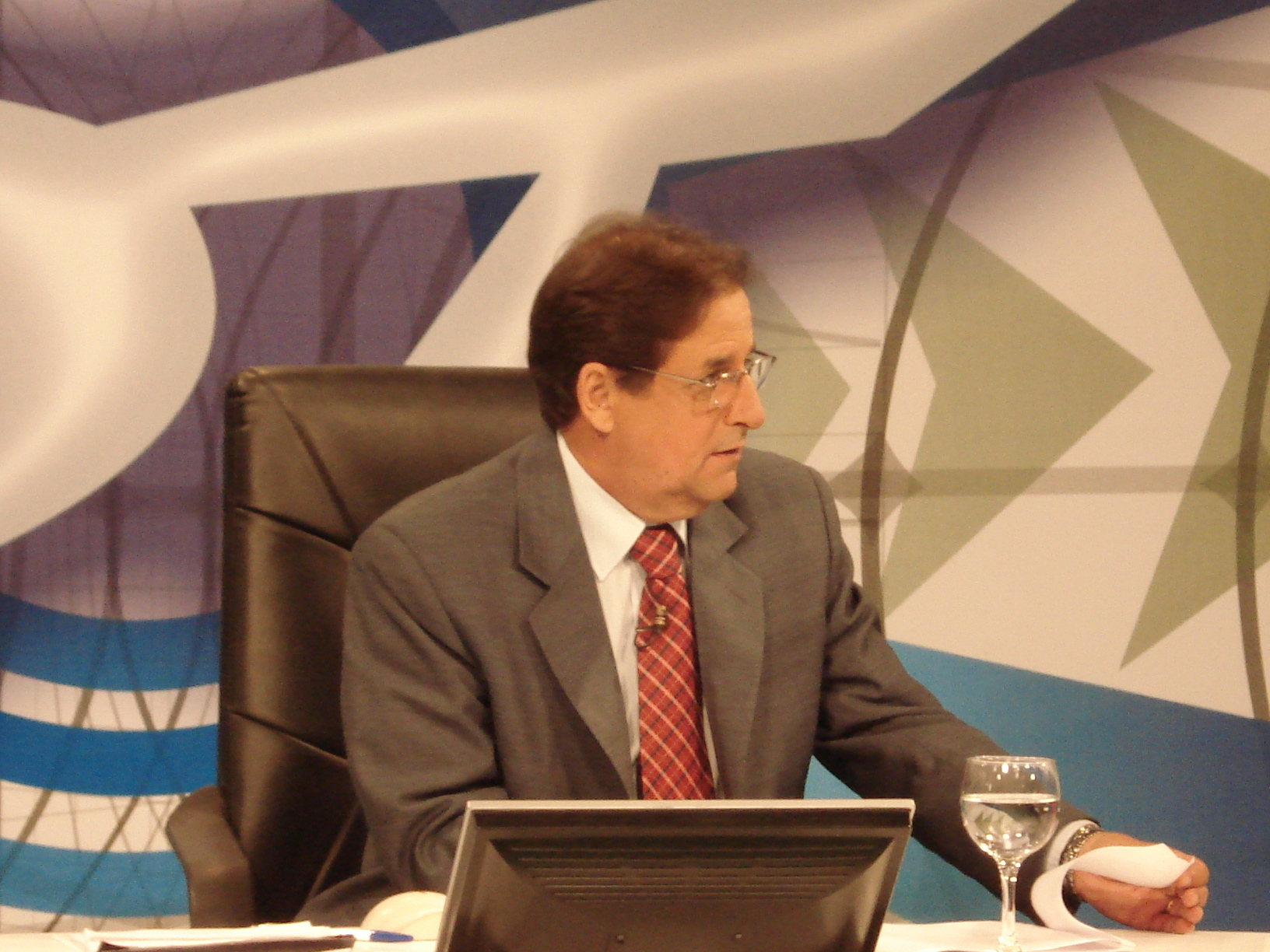
Carlos Muñoz in 2006

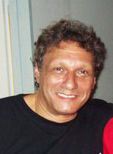
Alberto Kesman in 2011

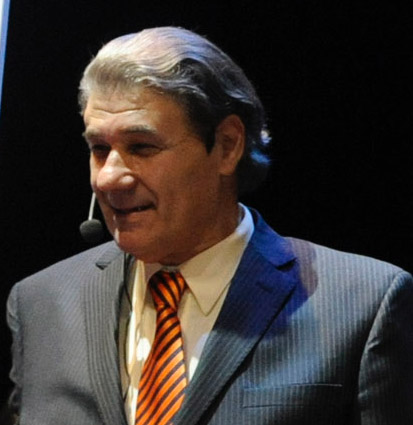
Víctor Hugo Morales in 2011
