= Pilar Barrios =

Uruguayan poet

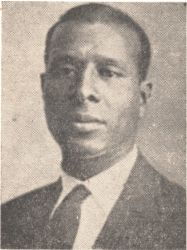
Pilar Barrios in 1948

Pilar Barrios (1889–1974) was an important poet of the black community of Uruguay and one of the founders of the Partido Autóctono Negro. He demonstrated in his poetry an understanding of the class-based racism in his society, and expressed hope that this could be overturned by the development of a racial consciousness (awareness of negritud) and renovation of education. He was optimistic in regards to this project, because he believed in the fundamental equality of people and races, as he expressed in his poems. One of his means of expression was the journal Nuestra raza, which he co-founded with his sister Maria in 1917. In 1937 he married Maruja Pereyra, an activist and fellow Nuestra Raza journalist.

With the publishing of Piel negra in 1947, he became one of only two black Uruguayan poets to be published in book form (the other was Virginia Brindis de Salas). As one of the most notable black intellectuals in the country, he was in contact with the larger world of black intellectual activity, corresponding with, for example, Langston Hughes.
