= Marcia Collazo =

Uruguayan lawyer, teacher, and writer

- Born: Marcia Collazo Ibáñez; 13 March 1959 (age 67); Melo, Uruguay
- Education: University of the Republic
- Occupations: Lawyer, teacher, writer
- Parents: Vladimiro Collazo (father); Suleika Ibáñez (mother)
- Awards: Bartolomé Hidalgo Award (2011); Woman of the Year Award (2012); Morosoli Award (2015)

Marcia Collazo Ibáñez (born 13 March 1959) is a Uruguayan lawyer, teacher, and writer. She is a recipient of the Bartolomé Hidalgo Revelation Award, Woman of the Year Award in the literary field, First Prize of the Museo de la Memoria and the Ministry of Education and Culture in the Nibia Sabalsagaray Contest, and the Morosoli Silver Award in Narrative.

== Biography ==
Marcia Collazo was born in Melo on 13 March 1959, the daughter of artist Vladimiro Collazo and writer Suleika Ibáñez. She received her PhD in Law and Social Sciences from the Faculty of Law of the University of the Republic. She was received as a professor of history at the Instituto de Profesores Artigas. She conducted several postgraduate studies in both specialties. She teaches the courses of History and History of Ideas in America at the Instituto de Profesores Artigas. In the Faculty of Law she is a professor of Philosophy of Law. She has published numerous essays and academic articles in the areas of law, history, and philosophy, as well as several literary works.

In 2011 and 2012 she received the Golden Book from the Uruguayan Book Chamber for the bestselling fiction book from a national author. Her work has been published in Argentina, France, Spain, and Cuba. Her poetic and narrative work was awarded on numerous occasions by the Municipality of Montevideo, the Ministry of Education and Culture, the University of the Republic, and the Uruguay House of Writers. In 2011 she received the Bartolomé Hidalgo Revelation Award and the Woman of the Year Award in the literary field. In 2015 she received the First Prize of the Museo de la Memoria and the Ministry of Education and Culture for her story "Tremendo pozo", in the Nibia Sabalsagaray Contest, and in the same year she won the Morosoli Silver Award in Narrative.

== Works ==
- 2004, A caballo de un signo (poetry), AEBU
- 2010, Alguien mueve los ruidos (poetry), Estuario
- 2011, Amores Cimarrones. Las mujeres de Artigas (novel), Banda Oriental
- 2012, La tierra alucinada: Memorias de una china cuartelera (novel), Banda Oriental
- 2014, A bala, sable o desgracia (short stories), Banda Oriental
- 2015, Seguirte el vuelo: amores y desamores de la historia uruguaya (essay), Banda Oriental
