= Chamberlain, Uruguay =

Chamberlain
- Village
- Location within Uruguay
- Coordinates: 32°37′0″S 56°28′0″W
- Country: Uruguay
- Department: Tacuarembó Department
- Elevation: 137 m (449 ft)

Population (2011)
  - Total: 52
- Time zone: UTC -3
- Postal code: 45100
- Dial plan: +598 4664 (+4 digits)

Chamberlain is a village or populated centre of Tacuarembó Department, in northern Uruguay. It is connected by railway with the city of Paysandú.

Chamberlain is notable as the birthplace of the poet, Sara de Ibáñez.

== Population ==
In 2011 Chamberlain had a population of 52.

Year	Population
1963	125
1975	133
1985	113
1996	91
2004	51
2011	52

Source: Instituto Nacional de Estadística de Uruguay
