= Fernando Butazzoni =

Uruguayan writer

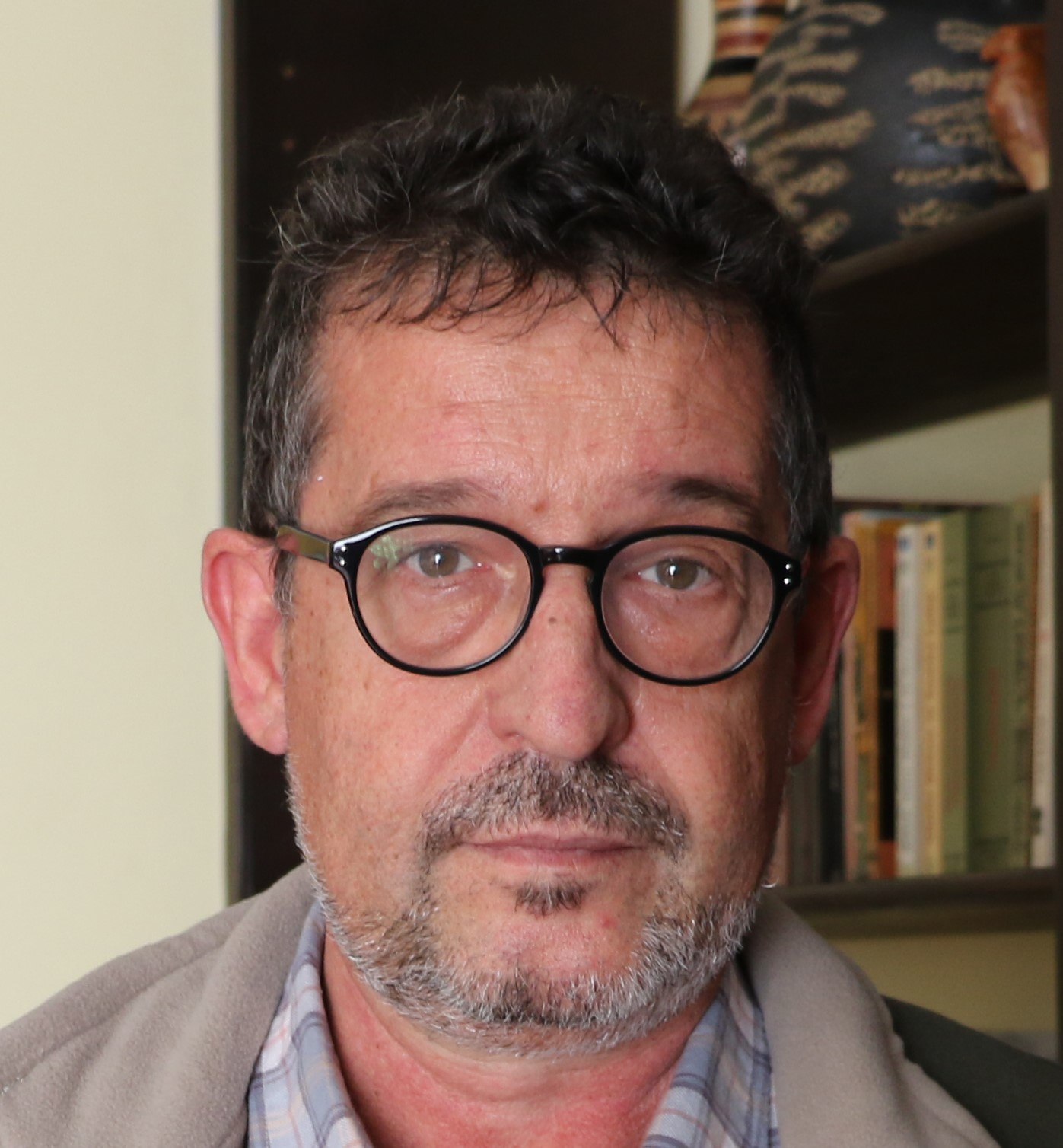
- Born: 1953 (age 71–72); Uruguay, Montevideo
- Notable work: Slave of God, El profeta imperfecto, Las cenizas del Condor
- Movement: Novel, journalism
- Awards: Premio Libro de Oro; Premio Bartolomé Hidalgo

Fernando Butazzoni (born 1953) is a Uruguayan novelist and journalist. Translated into a dozen languages, he is winner of many international awards for literature and cinema. In 1979, at the age of 25, he won the Casa de las Américas Literature Award. The Mexican writer and screenwriter Guillermo Arriaga described his work as "A pretty fucking powerful look at the relationship between life and death".

== Career ==
His first novel, The open night, was awarded by the Confederation of Universities of Central America with the Latin American Narrative Award EDUCA, in 1981. His works have been translated into several languages including English, French, Portuguese, Swedish, Italian, Rumanian and Russian.

In the Columbia Guide to the Latin America Novel... (2007), Raymond Williams wrote about his novel Prince of death: "Is a vast historical work set in nineteenth century". Alexandra Falek, in her thesis The Fiction of Afterwards(New York University, 2007), emphasized that the Butazzoni's work is "an example of testimonial fiction".

In 2009, director José Ramón Novoa filmed his novel "A distant place". The film starred Erich Wildpret and Marcela Kloosterboer.

The film God's Slave (2013), written by Fernando Butazzoni, directed by Joel Novoa, has won several international film awards (in Huelva, Santa Barbara, Lleida, among others). The film was described as "riveting" by Anath White.

In 2014, Planeta Group published "Ashes of Condor", an extensive report about terrorism in Latin America. The Uruguayan Book Chamber granted it the Bartolomé Hidalgo Award 2014 during the International Book Fair in Montevideo.

In 2016, Mario Vargas Llosa put the book Ashes of Condor on the short list of his Hispano-American Bienal, and Casa de las Américas granted it with the José María Arguedas Award.

== Bibliography ==
- 1979, Los días de nuestra sangre (short stories)
- 1981, La noche abierta (novel) (ISBN 84-8360-255-5)
- 1983, Con el ejército de Sandino (chronic)
- 1986, El tigre y la nieve (novel) (ISBN 9974-95-080-5)
- 1986, Nicaragua: news of war (chronic)
- 1987, Dance of the Lost (novel)
- 1997, Prince of Death (novel) (ISBN 950-731-173-4)
- 2004, Lautréamont Kingdom (essay) (ISBN 950-731-437-7)
- 2009, Imperfect Prophet (novel) (ISBN 978-9974-643-29-1)
- 2009, A distant place (novel) (ISBN 978-9974-643-82-6)
- 2014, Las cenizas del Cóndor (novel) (ISBN 978-9974-700-65-9)
- 2016, La vida y los papeles (chronic) (ISBN 978-9974-737-23-5)
- 2017, Una historia americana (novel) (ISBN 978-9974-881-16-7)

== Filmography (as writer) ==
- 2002, Seregni-Rosencof
- 2010, A distant place (Avalon-Aleph-Joel Films)
- 2013, God' Slave (Joel Films)
- 2014, Solo (Unity Films)
- 2016, Tamara (Unity Films, Joel Films)
