= Lo no dicho =

- First edition
- Author: Horacio López Usera
- Original title: Lo no dicho
- Language: Spanish
- Series: Horacio López Usera
- Subject: autobiography
- Genre: narrative
- Publisher: Aguilar
- Publication date: 2013
- Publication place: Uruguay
- Pages: 432
- ISBN: 9789974989818
- Preceded by: El camino es la recompensa

Lo no dicho, (The unspoken in English) is the fifth book of the Uruguayan Horacio López Usera. Published in 2013.

== Review ==
It is a book that deals with addictions, to drugs, sex, gambling, screen, work, food, among others.

Horacio López was formed as "operador terapéutico" in addiction. The book was presented 11 April 11, in House of the Seven Winds, in Montevideo.
