= Alicia Escardó =

Uruguayan writer and content creator (born 1963)

- Born: Alicia Escardó Vegh; 25 June 1963 (age 63); Montevideo, Uruguay
- Education: University of the Republic; Pompeu Fabra University; National University of Distance Education
- Occupations: Writer, cultural manager
- Website: aliciaescardo.net

Alicia Escardó Vegh (born 25 June 1963) is a Uruguayan writer, cultural manager, and multimedia e-learning content creator.

== Biography ==
Alicia Escardó was born in Montevideo on 25 June 1963. She graduated from the University of the Republic's Faculty of Engineering with the title of computer analyst. From 2002 to 2008 she lived in Spain and studied at Pompeu Fabra University in Barcelona and the National University of Distance Education in Madrid.

She has published several fiction books with Ediciones de la Banda Oriental, Ediciones Trilce, Editorial Fin de Siglo, Quipu Libros, and Penguin Random House. She has participated in two collective books, published stories in magazines, and has received mentions and awards for her literary work.

Escardó has also organized several cultural events, including the Semana Negra Uy – recognized by the Ministry of Education and Culture (MEC) Cultural Incentive Funds – and the Cycle of Exhibitions of Juan Capagorry, a project which won an MEC Competitive Grant.

== Works ==
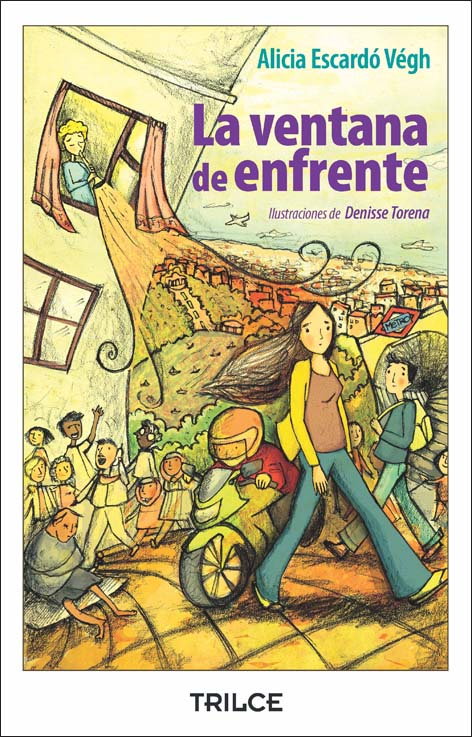

- El poder invisible (Banda Oriental, 2011)
- La ventana de enfrente (Trilce, 2012)
- El chico que se sentaba en el rincón (Fin de Siglo, 2014)
- Nayla y el misterio XO (Fin de Siglo, 2015)
- Mavi, no te rindas (Quipu, 2017)
- Escape de los Balcanes, (co-author, Random House, 2018)
- La muerte de Pan (Fin de Siglo, 2019)

=== Collective books ===
- Cuentos de montaña errante (Fin de Siglo, 2017)
- 25/40 Narradores de la Banda Oriental (Banda Oriental, 2018)

=== Crime fiction anthologies ===
- Semana negra.uy: Archivos confidenciales (Ediciones de la Plaza, 2019)

== Awards and honors ==
- Posdata Magazine Novel Contest, Para llegar al final, 2000, mention
- Horacio Quiroga International Contest, book El poder invisible, 2011, first prize
- MEC Annual Literature Awards, juvenile literature, Niños como pájaros, 2013, mention
- Onetti Award, Intendency of Montevideo, youth literature, Mi pueblo ya no es el mismo, 2014, mention
- MEC Annual Literature Awards, youth literature, El chico que se sentaba en el rincón, 2014, second prize
- Narrators of the Banda Oriental National Narrative Award, Lolita Rubial Foundation, narrative, El naufragio, 2014, mention
- MEC Annual Literature Awards, youth literature, Nayla y el misterio XO, 2017, first prize
