= Iris Cabral =

Afro-Uruguayan journalist, political and social activist (1906 – June 1936)

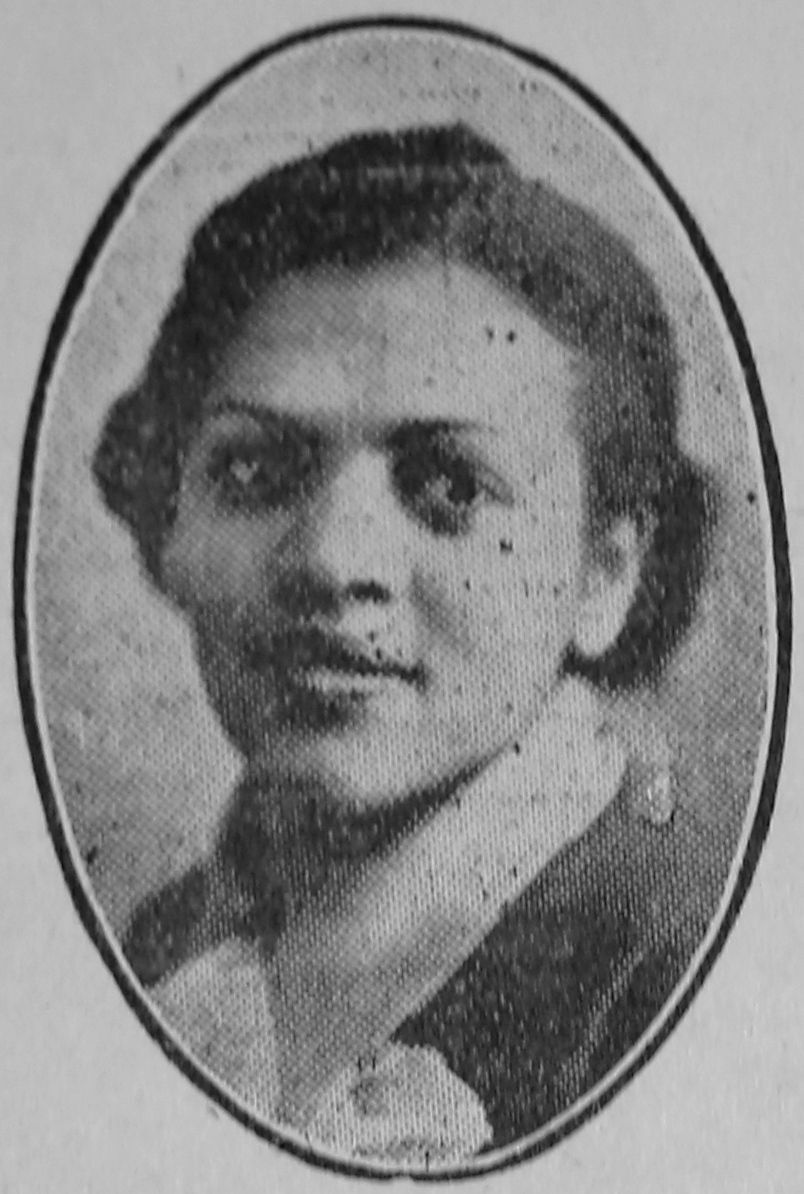
- Born: 1905; Uruguay
- Died: June 1936 (aged 30–31); Uruguay
- Occupations: Feminist and labor activist
- Known for: Organized the first domestic workers' union in Uruguay

Iris Cabral (1906 – June 1936) was an Afro-Uruguayan feminist and labor activist.

== Life ==
Cabral organized the first domestic workers' union in Uruguay. In the 1930s she and Clementina Silva founded the first Anti-Fascist Committee of Uruguay. She and Maruja Pereyra were the "most visible, militant and outspoken" contributors to the Afro-Uruguayan paper Nuestra Raza after it was restarted in 1933. Both Cabral and Pereyra participated in the April 1936 National Congress of Women. However, Cabral died young in June 1936.

== Legacy ==
Pereyra remembered Cabral in glowing terms:

She was an example of our youth, she gave everything to her race. Everything I said about her, about her merits, would pale by comparison with the reality. Perhaps too good for this world, she led us to a better world.

In 2016 Cabral's memory was honoured by the legislature of Montevideo.
