= Almas de vagar =

2009 book by Horacio López Usera

- Author: Horacio López Usera
- Original title: Almas de vagar
- Language: Spanish
- Series: Horacio López Usera
- Subject: Autobiography, travel book
- Genre: Narrative
- Publisher: Independent
- Publication date: 2009
- Publication place: Uruguay
- ISBN: 978-9974-96-722-9
- Preceded by: La vereda del destino
- Followed by: La Fiesta Inolvidable

Almas de vagar (Wandering of soul in English), is the second book by the Uruguayan Horacio López Usera, published in 2009.

== Review ==
The book is an independent edition; a travel book, which features stories "de mochila a la espalda" (backpack) and reflect the journey of former basketball player in places like Southeast Asia, Central America and various corners of Uruguay.
