= Pilar Sordo =

Chilean psychologist (born 1965)

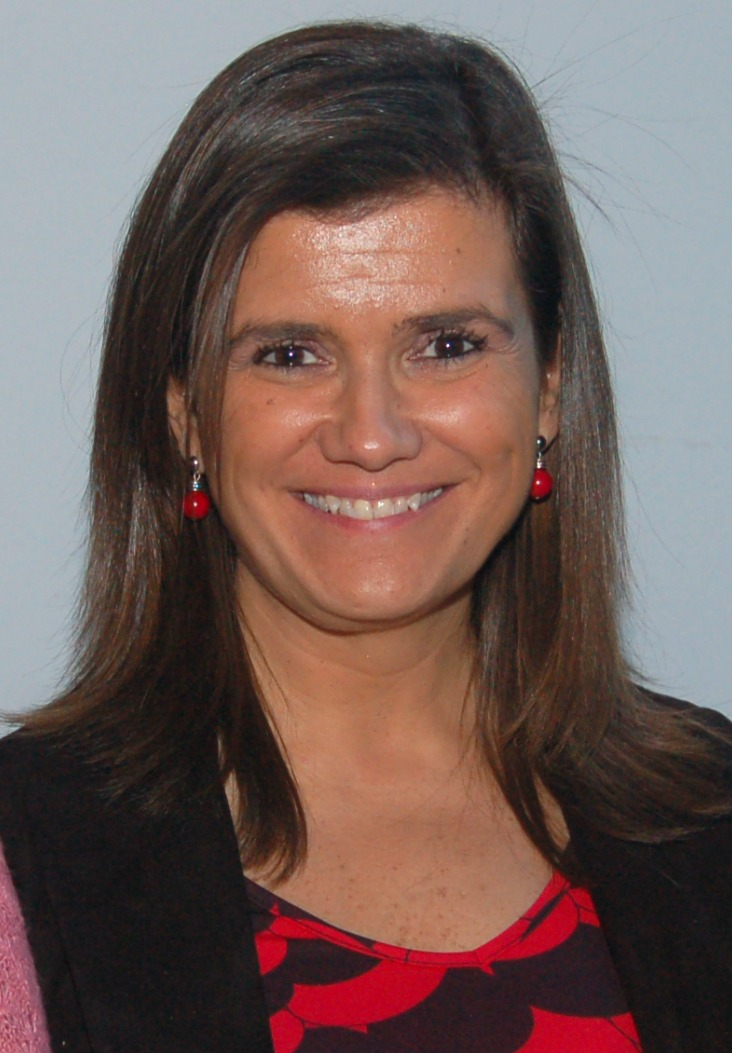
- 2011
- Born: María del Pilar Sordo Martínez; 22 October 1965 (age 60); Temuco, Chile
- Education: Diego Portales University
- Occupations: Psychologist, columnist, lecturer
- Spouse: Juan Fabri (2013–present)
- Partner: Óscar Letelier González (2007–2009)
- Children: Cristián, Nicole
- Awards: Alberto Hurtado Award (2010); Golden Book Award (2016)
- Website: www.pilarsordo.cl

María del Pilar Sordo Martínez (born 22 October 1965) is a Chilean psychologist, columnist, lecturer, and writer.

Her books are about research into interpersonal relationships, written in a style which is sometimes classified as personal development.

== Biography ==
Pilar Sordo lived in Temuco, her hometown, until she was 15 years old. Then the family moved to Viña del Mar, where her father occupied the position of manager in a branch of the Las Brisas supermarket. Three years later, she went to Santiago, where she settled in a boarding house and began studying psychology at Diego Portales University. She married a native of Viña del Mar, returned to that city, and had two children, Cristián and Nicole. They soon separated and she devoted herself to her professional practice and deepening her research in workshops at schools and hospitals. From that experience would come the material for books and talks that would make her famous.

She directs the CáncerVida Foundation for patients with lung and pancreatic cancer, in memory of Óscar Letelier González, with whom she had a romantic relationship from 2007 until his death in 2009.

Sordo is divorced, and a widow. She remarried in 2013, to businessman Juan Fabri.

== Style of work ==
Sordo is a commentator on typical behavior in different countries of Latin America. Her works are expressed in language for the general public, using her own experiences to conduct research, analyze them, and build conclusions.

Her writings cover topics such as sex and family.

== Books ==
- 2005, ¡Viva la diferencia!, Planeta, ISBN 9789562475976
- 2007, Con el Coco en el diván (with Coco Legrand), ISBN 9789568601072
- 2009, No quiero crecer, Planeta, ISBN 9789562475990
- 2010, Lecciones de seducción, Planeta, ISBN 9789562475983
- 2012, Bienvenido dolor, Planeta, ISBN 9789562476010
- 2014, No quiero envejecer, Planeta, ISBN 9789562477987
- 2016, Oídos sordos, Planeta, ISBN 9789563600803
- 2017, Educar para sentir, sentir para educar, Planeta, ISBN 9789563604023

== Awards and recognitions ==
- Chosen among the 100 women leaders of Chile in 2006, 2007, 2010, and 2013
- 2007 Woman of the Year from the newspaper El Observador
- 2010 Atrevidas Award (Argentina)
- 2010 Featured Woman of the portal Mundo Mujer
- 2010 Alberto Hurtado Award
- 2010-2011 Outstanding Woman, for enduring support of Chilean women, granted by the San Juan de Dios Hospital, Santiago
- Ambassador of Mujeres con Pantalones since 2011
- 2016 Golden Book Award (Uruguay) for Oídos sordos
- Part of the honor roll of the 21 most influential people in Chile
