= La vereda del destino =

Las vereda del destino
- Author: Horacio López Usera
- Original title: Las vereda del destino
- Cover artist: Andrés Rojí
- Language: Spanish
- Series: Horacio López Usera
- Subject: autobiography, memoir
- Genre: narrative
- Publisher: Aguilar; Santillana
- Publication date: 2006
- Publication place: Uruguay
- Pages: 339 - 370
- Awards: Premio Bartolomé Hidalgo
- ISBN: 978-9974-95-340-6
- Followed by: Almas de vagar

La vereda del destino (The Sidewalk of Destiny in English), is the first book of the Uruguayan Horacio López Usera.

== Review ==
This book published in 2006 won the Premio Bartolomé Hidalgo revelation, and was a great surprise in the Feria del libro de Uruguay (Uruguay the Book Exhibition). Horacio López tells his experience from a perspective that is naturally very personal, observing, with rigour and a critical tone, the time period that he lived through from infancy to adolescence. In 2009 a pocket edition was published.
