= Ana Barrios Camponovo =

Uruguayan writer and illustrator

- Born: 20 June 1961 (age 63); Montevideo, Uruguay
- Occupation(s): Actress, writer, illustrator
- Awards: Bartolomé Hidalgo Award

Ana Barrios Camponovo (born 20 June 1961) is a Uruguayan actress, writer, and illustrator.

== Career ==
Ana Barrios Camponovo studied medicine at the Hospital de Clínicas and specialized in traditional Chinese medicine.

She performed in theater in Uruguay and abroad. She was an actress, scriptwriter, and co-writer for the Teatro de la Barraca group in Uruguay, Argentina, and Brazil from 1983 to 1987.

Her book Juan y la bicicleta encantada won the Bartolomé Hidalgo Award in 1995. It was published in Mexico, the United States, Canada, and the Philippines.

Alfaguara published her book Quepo Quito, which took 2nd Prize at the Ministry of Education and Culture Awards in 1997.

She lives in Spain where she has an online television program named Universo Infancia.

== Awards ==
Year	Award	Book
1995	Bartolomé Hidalgo Award	Juan y la bicicleta encantada
1997	Ministry of Education and Culture Award	Quepo Quito

== Works ==
- Del verdadero origen de las cometas y otros cuentos del país de los nunca vistos, Tae, 1992, OCLC 42042638
- Francisca y el corazón de las ideas, Tae, 1994
- Juan y la bicicleta encantada, Alfaguara, 1995, ISBN 9789974410220
- Quepo Quito, Alfaguara, 1997, ISBN 9789974590885
- Pipiribicho, Productora Editorial, 1997
- Evaristo camaleón, Productora Editorial, 1997
- Pipiribicho, Ediciones de Picaporte, Uruguay, 1998
- Mandalas a volar, Diputación Provincial de Cuenca/Devas, 2007, ISBN 9789875820333
- Señor niño, National University of Colombia, 2009
