= Daniel Mella =

Uruguayan writer (born 1976)

- Born: 11 February 1976 (age 50); Montevideo, Uruguay
- Occupation: writer
- Writing career
- Notable work: Pogo
- Notable awards: Bartolomé Hidalgo Award

Daniel Mella (born Montevideo, 1976) is a Uruguayan writer.

He published his first novel Pogo in 1997 at the age of 21, followed by two more novels in quick succession. He then took a decade-long break from writing, returning with the short story collection Lava which won the Bartolomé Hidalgo Award in 2013. His next book, the novel El Hermano Mayor was based on the death of his younger brother Alejandro in 2014. This too won the Bartolomé Hidalgo Award and has been translated into English by Charco Press.

== Works ==
- 1997, Pongo
- 1998, Derretimiento
- 2000, Noviembre
- 2013, Lava
- 2016, El hermano mayor
- 2020, Visiones para Emma
- 2024, Yo quiero a mi bandera
