= Independent Democratic Feminist Party =

Independent Democratic Feminist Party Partido Independiente Demócrata Feminista
- Foundress: Sara Rey Álvarez
- Founded: 1932
- Dissolved: 1938
- Ideology: Feminism

Party flag

The Independent Democratic Feminist Party (Spanish: Partido Independiente Demócrata Feminista, PIDF) was a political party in Uruguay founded by Sara Rey Álvarez. The party emerged after the women's suffrage law was approved in 1932, and participated in the 1938 general elections.

== History ==
Sara Rey Álvarez launched the Independent Democratic Feminist Party on 15 January 1933, after the passing of the woman's suffrage law in Uruguay. Sofía Álvarez Vignoli left the party in early 1933 over the party's failure to defend a woman's right to divorce. From June 1933 onwards the party published a journal, Ideas y Acción.

The Independent Democratic Feminist Party pressed for reform of the Uruguayan Civil Code at the First National Women's Congress in Montevideo in 1936.

Though the PIDF disapproved of Gabriel Terra's 1933 coup, and opposed the 1934 constitution, it advocated continued participation in political elections. It therefore took part in the 1938 Uruguayan general election, the first national Uruguayan election in which women had the right to vote. However, the party did not get a single candidate elected, and only receive 122 votes. It was disbanded soon after.
