= Ruperto Long =

Uruguayan politician (born 1952)

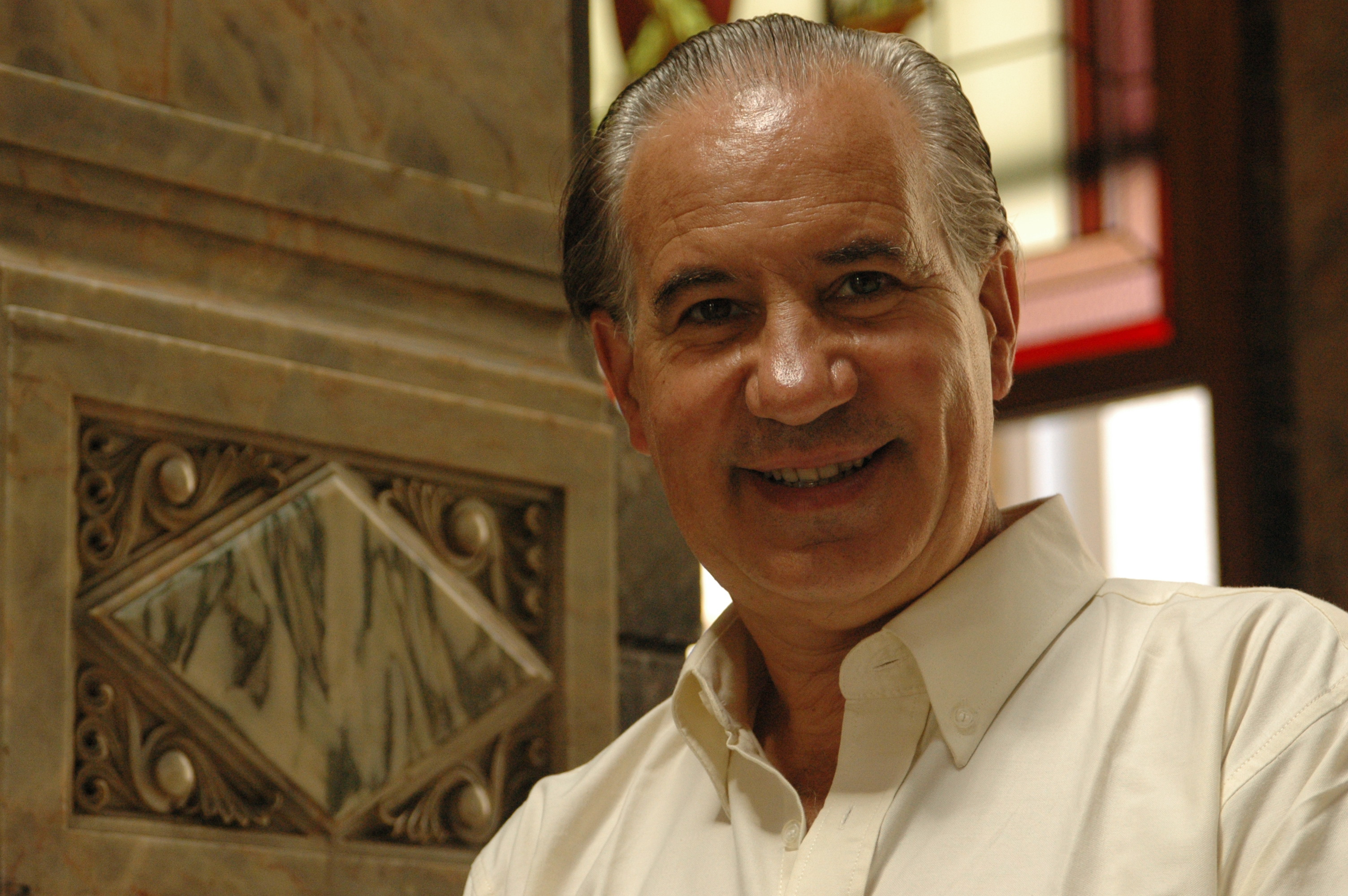
- Ruperto Long in 2008.
- Born: Ruperto Enzo Long Garat; 23 December 1952 (age 73); Rosario, Uruguay
- Education: Universidad de la República
- Occupations: engineer, politician, writer
- Political party: National Party
- Spouse: Susana Galli Herrero
- Children: Rodolfo, Magdalena
- Awards: Premio Libro de Oro; Premio Legión del Libro; Premio Morosoli; Premio Jerusalén
- Website: http://www.rupertolong.com.uy/

Ruperto Long (born 23 December 1952 in Rosario, Uruguay), Uruguayan engineer, politician and writer.

== Biography ==
Long got his engineering degree from the Universidad de la República; later he studied technology management at Harvard Business School.

He worked in several Uruguayan public bodies, including UTE, and LATU, which he presided (1990–2003).

He served as Senator, representing the National Party (2005–2010).

He is also a writer. His main publications are:

- 2002, Che Bandoneón.
- 2009, Hablando claro.
- 2012, No dejaré memorias. El enigma del Conde de Lautréamont.
