= Cecilia Curbelo =

Uruguayan writer

- Cecilia Curbelo in 2026.
- Born: Cecilia Curbelo Berberián; 23 January 1975; Montevideo
- Education: Universidad Católica del Uruguay
- Occupations: journalist, columnist, writer
- Children: Rocío
- Awards: Premio Cervantes en 2011; Premio Quijote 2012; Premio Bartolomé Hidalgo in 2012; Premio Libro de Oro; Premio Legión del Libro
- Website: www.ceciliacurbelo.com

Cecilia Curbelo (Montevideo, 23 January 1975), also known as Ceci, is an Uruguayan journalist, columnist, writer and publishing.

== Books ==
| Year | Name | ISBN | Editorial | Other |
|---|---|---|---|---|
| 2005 | Mujeres simples | TBD | Editorial Autores Uruguayos | TBD |
| 2006 | Terapiadas | TBD | Editorial Autores Uruguayos | TBD |
| 2010 | Secretos bien guardados | TBD | Editorial Torre del Vigía | TBD |
| 2011 | La decisión de Camila | ISBN 9789974683709 | Sudamericana | bestseller |
| 2012 | Las dos caras de Sofía | ISBN 9789974683907 | Sudamericana | TBD |
| 2014 | La otra vida de Belén | ISBN 9789974713611 | Penguin Random House | TBD |
| 2015 | La búsqueda de Lucía | ISBN 9789974723870 | Penguin Random House | TBD |
| 2015 | Palabras y emociones de la A a la Z | ISBN 9789974723900 | Penguin Random House | TBD |
| 2016 | Aunque él no esté | ISBN 9789974736672 | Sudamericana | TBD |

- 2017, Aunque ella esté ISBN 9789974748507
- 2018, A la manera de Agustina ISBN 9789974888371
- 2019, Lucas (e Inés) sin etiquetas ISBN 9789974899223
- 2019, Maju, ¡pará de hablar! ISBN 9789974903258
- 2020, Lo que Natalia no sabe ISBN 9789915652078
- 2021, Maju, ¡no sos el ombligo del mundo! (ISBN 9789915652900)
- 2021, Matías y Emma en una jaula de oro.
- 2022, Amiga tóxica.

== Awards ==
- 2011, Premio Cervantes.
- 2012, Premio Quijote.
- 2012, Golden Book Award by Cámara Uruguaya del Libro (Uruguayan Book Chamber), for her book La decisión de Camila, to be bestseller of the year.
- 2012, Premio Bartolomé Hidalgo, revelación.
- 2014, Golden Book Award by Cámra Uruguaya del Libro (Uruguayan Book Chamber), for her book La otra vida de Belén, to be bestseller of the year.
