= Horacio López =

- Born: Horacio Rodolfo López Usera; 22 January 1961 (age 64); Montevideo, Uruguay
- Occupation(s): basketball, professor, journalist, writer
- Children: 2
- Parent: Nilsa Usera
- Awards: Premio Bartolomé Hidalgo; Premio Charrúa de Oro

Horacio Rodolfo López Usera (born 22 January 1961) is a Uruguayan athlete, professor, journalist, writer, and former basketball player who competed in the 1984 Summer Olympics.

== Books ==
Year	Name	ISBN	Editorial	Other
2007	La vereda del destino	9974-95-119-4	Aguilar	autobiography
2009	Almas de vagar	978-9974-96-722.9	Independiente	travel book
2010	La fiesta inolvidable	9789974981317		prologue Oscar Washington Tabárez.
2012	El camino es la recompensa	9789974956124	Aguilar	biography
2013	Lo no dicho	9789974989818	Aguilar	about addiction.
2017	Muzungu blues	9789974916012		biography
