= Mario Bardanca =

Uruguayan sportscaster, journalist, radio personality, and writer

- Born: Mario Bardanca; 1968 (age 57–58); Uruguay
- Occupations: sportscaster, writer, journalist, radio personality
- Awards: Premio Libro de Oro

Mario Bardanca (Montevideo, 1968) is a Uruguayan sportscaster, journalist, radio personality, and writer.

== Career ==
He has worked in broadcast sports journalism since his youth, being employed as a commentator on sports highlights at Saeta TV Channel 10 on the shows Deporte Total, La Cabalgata Deportiva Gillette, and El Despegue. He anchored special coverage of the Olympic Games in 1992, 1996, and 2000.

Bardanca participated in the sports show Línea de Tres, hosted La Caja Negra, and was a columnist for Informe Capital on TV Ciudad. He also writes articles for the magazine Caras y Caretas.

He hosts the radio program Derechos Exclusivos and provides commentary on Channel 5's Estadio Uno, a classic of Uruguayan television. He currently serves on the news team of Telenoche, on Monte Carlo TV Channel 4.

== Books ==
Year	Name	ISBN	Editorial	Other
2007	Yo, Paco	978-9974-8141-2-7	Sudamericana	A before and after look at Uruguayan football. Bestseller.

In 2007, the book "Yo, Paco" won the Premio Libro de Oro (Golden Book Award).
