= Dorila Castell de Orozco =

Doris Castell de Orozco
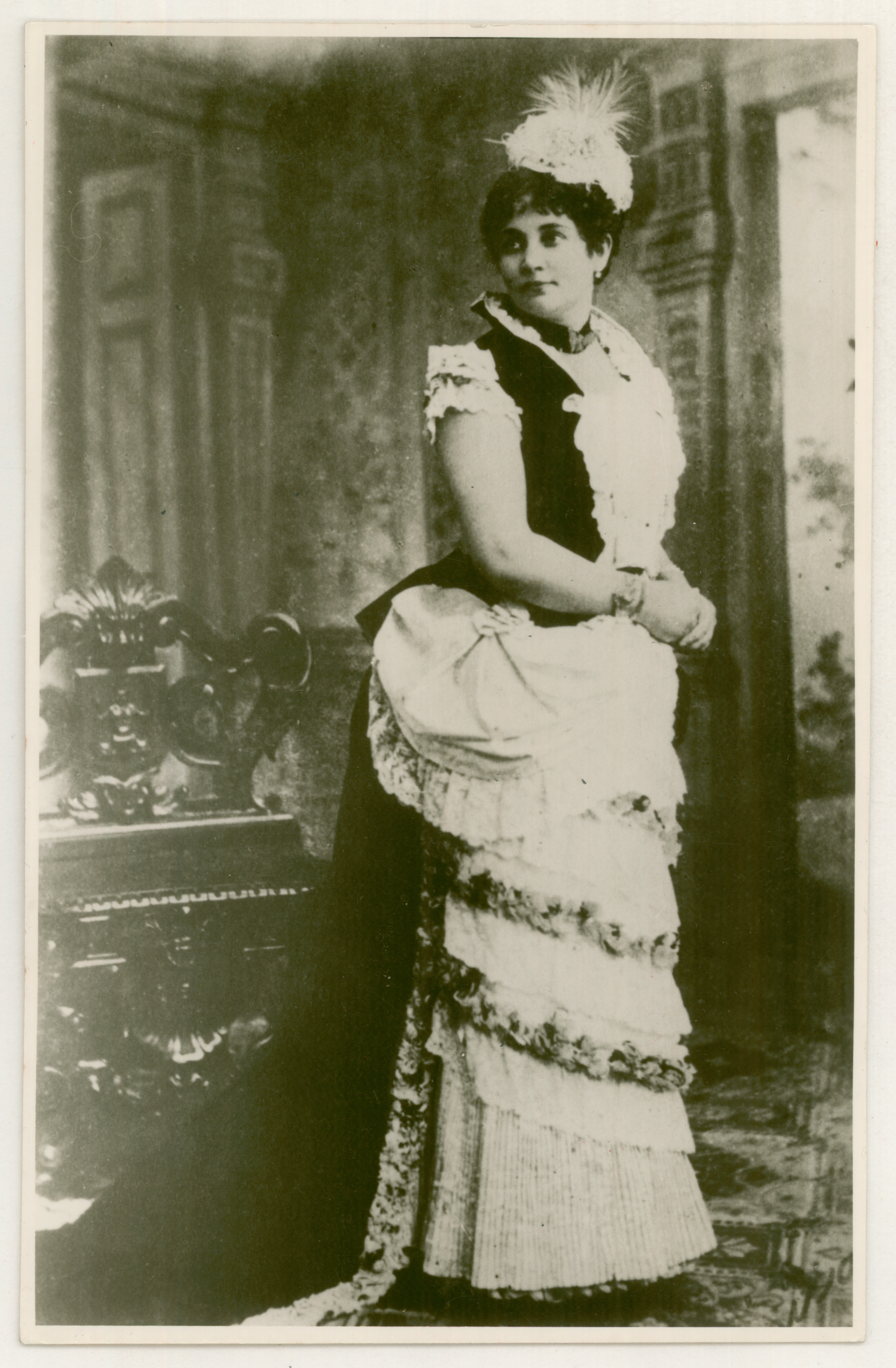
- Born: 8 December 1845; San Carlos, Uruguay
- Died: 20 September 1930 (aged 84); Montevideo
- Occupation(s): Writer, teacher
- Relatives: Adela Castell (sister)

Dorila Castell de Orozco (8 December 1845 – 20 September 1930) was an Uruguayan poet and teacher who wrote in various publications under the pseudonym Una Oriental.

== Biography ==
Dorila Castell de Orozco was born in San Carlos, Uruguay on 8 December 1845 to Francisco Castell and Adelaida Ducrosé. She studied in Buenos Aires, graduating in 1865 as a teacher. From there, she moved to Paysandú and opened a school for girls in the north of the city, inspiring her younger sister, Adela Castell, to continue her own education and eventually come to work in Paysandú. Dorila Castell continued to teach even after the Varelian Reform and married at 17 to Justiniano Orozco y Zambrano.

Starting in 1875, Castell would for over a decade write for numerous local newspapers and for La ondina del Plata and El álbum del hogar, under Luis Telmo Pintos and Gervasio Méndez, respectively. Her writings would also appear in the Buenos Aires paper La alborada literaria del Plata, owned by Josefina Pelliza de Sagasta and Dolores Larrosa de Ansaldi as well as Julio Herrera y Reissig's La Revista.
