= María Esperanza Barrios =

Uruguayan writer

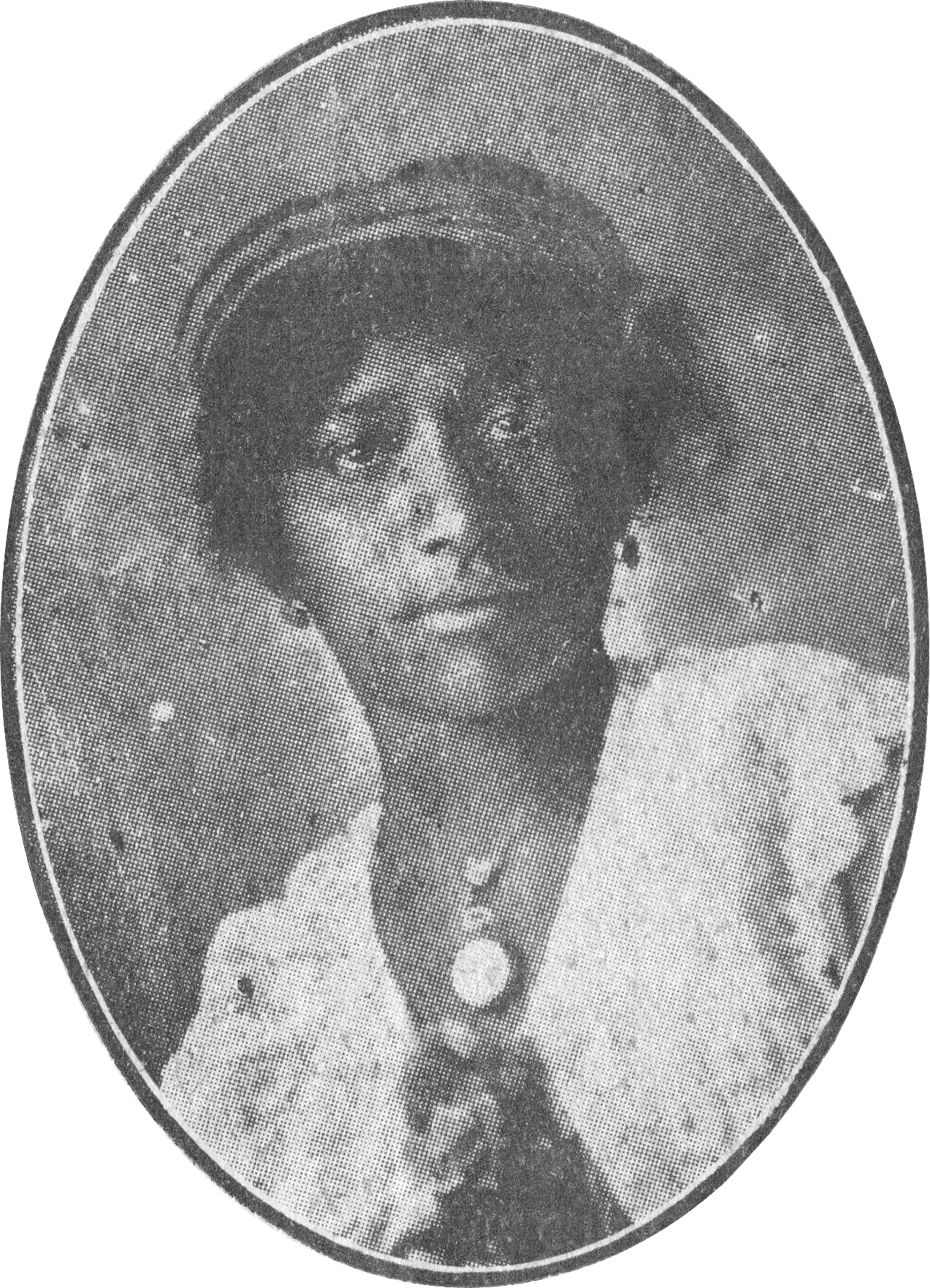
- Born: 1892
- Died: 1932 (aged 39–40)
- Education: Self-educated
- Occupations: Journalist, writer

María Esperanza Barrios (18 December 1892 – 2 October 1932) was an Uruguayan journalist and writer. She notably co-founded Nuestra Raza, a long-running periodical catering to Uruguay's Afro-Latin population.

== Biography ==
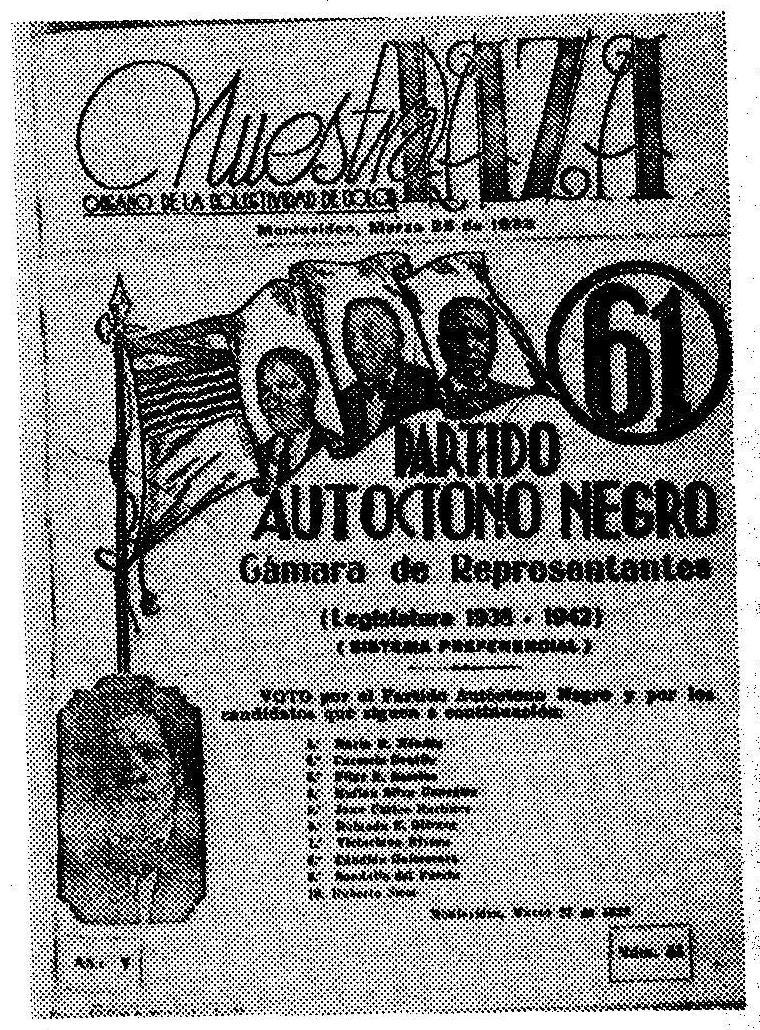
Nuesta Raza - Our Race

Barrios was born in 1892. She was the sister to the influential journalist and poet Pilar Barrios, whom had founded a paper titled La Verdad in 1911. Maria worked as a correspondent for the paper until 1914, before going on to co-found the periodical Nuesta Raza with her brother in 1917. The magazine was published in San Carlos and it continued to publish for ten years when the editor had to announce that it was to cease publication. The paper blamed its end on apathy and lack of results. Nuesta Raza was later cited as being important tool for advocating civil rights reforms in Uruguay. Similarly, Barrios was noted for her interest in art and has been cited as being a precursor to the black feminist movement.
