= Adela Castell =

Uruguayan teacher, essayist, and poet (1864–1926)

Adela Castell de López Rocha
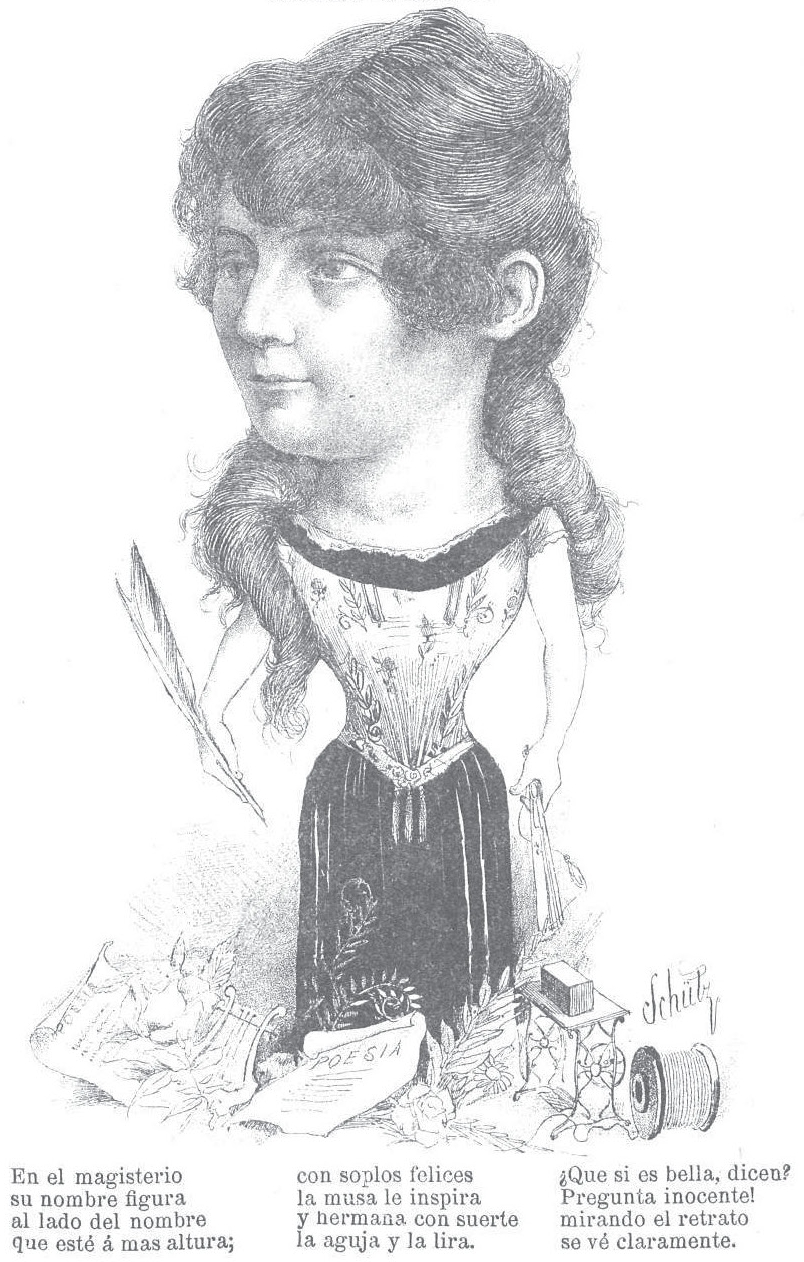
- Caricature of Adela Castell by Charles Schütz published in Caras y Caretas, 25 January 1891
- Born: Adela Castell Ducrosé; 1864; Paysandú
- Died: 1926 (aged 61–62)
- Occupation: Teacher
- Relatives: Adelaida Ducrosé (mother); Francisco Castell (father); Dorila Castell de Orozco (sister)
- Writing career
- Pen name: Zulema
- Genres: Poetry, essays

Adela Castell de López Rocha (1864 in Paysandú – 1926) was an Uruguayan teacher, essayist, and poet.

== Biography ==
Adela Castell de López Rocha was born to Francisco Castell and Adelaida Ducrosé on 1864 in the Uruguayan city of Paysandú. At the age of 13, she entered the teaching profession with her sister, Dorila Castell de Orozco, taking over a class at the school she ran. Two years later, she began her studies in law and philosophy and in 1887 graduated with a Master's degree and was named sub-director of the Escuela de Aplicación de Señoritas. Here she found success, assembling a staff to her liking and becoming very popular with students, parents, and staff alike.

She gave lectures on topics of education in Uruguay and Paraguay and became the first woman to make speeches in both republics, speaking at the culture club of Asunción and Oriental Club of Buenos Aires. At the meeting of the Pan-American Scientific Congress held at Montevideo in 1901, she presented the work Relationship between Primary and Normal Schools, which was transcribed and drew attention from as far away as Spain to the ideas contained within. For some of her works, Castell used the pseudonym Zulema.
