= Suleika Ibáñez =

- Born: Suleika Ibáñez Iglesias; 8 December 1930; Montevideo, Uruguay
- Died: 7 March 2013 (aged 82); Montevideo, Uruguay
- Occupation(s): Writer, teacher, translator
- Spouse: Vladimiro Collazo
- Children: Marcia Collazo
- Parents: Roberto Ibáñez (father); Sara de Ibáñez (mother)
- Relatives: Ulalume González de León (sister)

Suleika Ibáñez Iglesias (8 December 1930 – 7 March 2013) was a Uruguayan writer, teacher, and translator.

== Biography ==
Suleika Ibáñez was born in Montevideo on 8 December 1930, the daughter of poets Roberto Ibáñez and Sara de Ibáñez. Her siblings were the writers Ulalume González de León and Solveig Ibáñez. She was married to plastic artist Vladimiro Collazo, and was the mother of writer Marcia Collazo. Another daughter, Galia, died at a young age, and Ibáñez dedicated the 2002 book Galia, con quien tanto quería to her.

She taught literature in Lavalleja Department, in Melo, at the Instituto de Profesores Artigas (IPA), and at the Catholic University of Uruguay.

She received awards in contests by Givré (Buenos Aires, 1976), Ediciones de la Banda Oriental (1985), and the newspaper La Hora (1986). In 1989, the Departmental Intendency of Montevideo awarded her two first prizes in poetry and narrative. That year, she and Ricardo Prieto shared a dramaturgy prize from the publishing house TAE. In 1998, she won first prize from Uruguay's Academia Nacional de Letras with an essay on Juana de Ibarbourou, and an honorable mention from the Biblioteca Nacional for an essay on César Vallejo. In 2010, she received the Cultural Career Award, during the Poets of the Two Shores Congress in Punta del Este, from the publishing house Botella al Mar.

Suleika Ibáñez died in Montevideo on 7 March 2013.

== Selected works ==
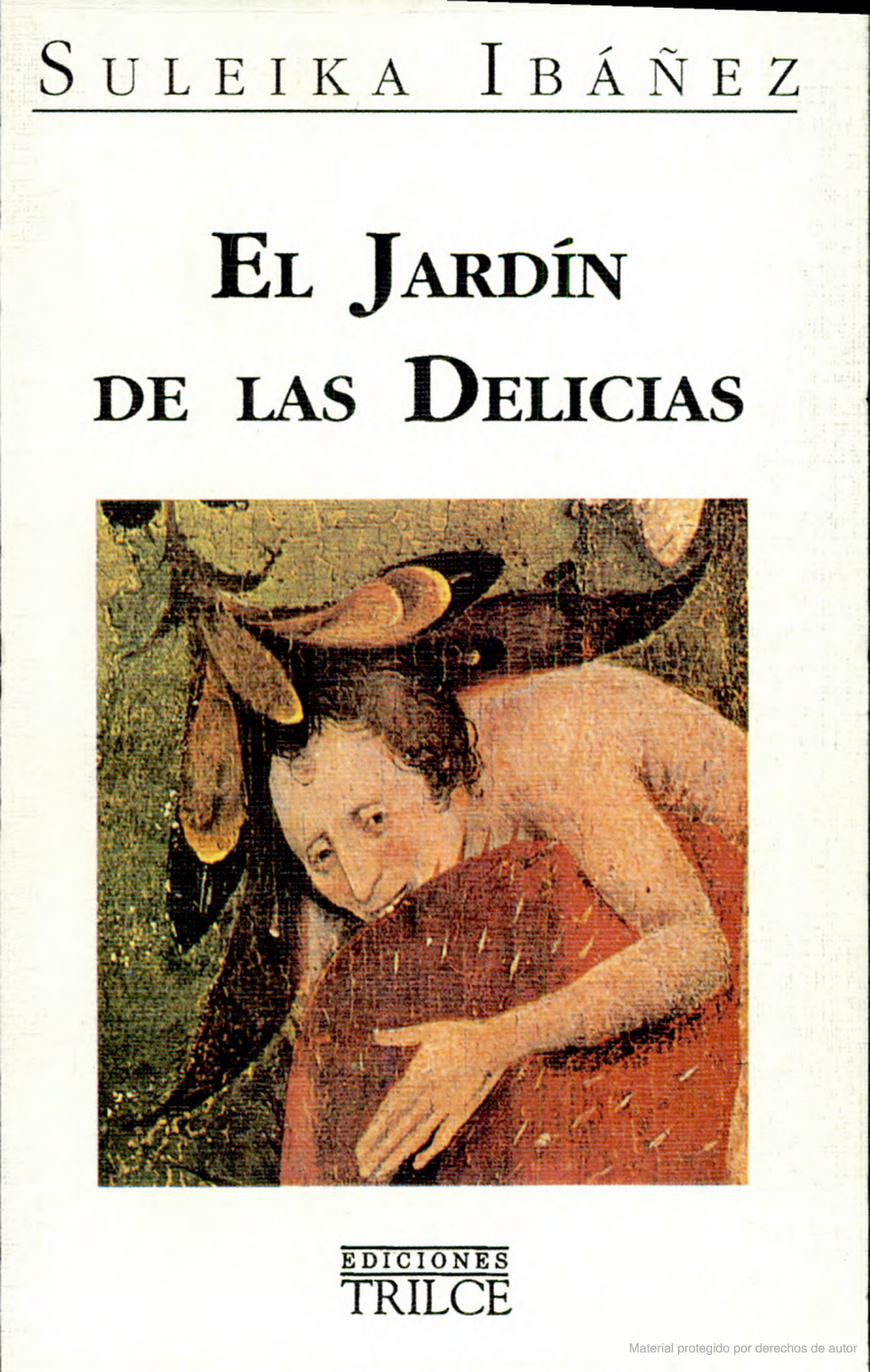

- 1975 – Herrera y Reissig, su vida y obra
- 1985 – Feliz Año Nuevo (play)
- 1989 – Homenaje a Jean Genet (Nuestra Señora de las Flores)
- 1990 – Retrato de bellos y de bestias
- 1991 – El Jardín de las Delicias
- 1993 – Experiencias con ángeles y demonios
- 1998 – La hija del molinero y otros cuentos de fantasmas
- 2002 – Galia, con quien tanto quería
