= Sara Rey Álvarez =

Uruguayan lawyer, writer, feminist and political activist

Sara Rey Álvarez (1894–1949) was a Uruguayan writer, feminist and political activist.

== Life ==
Sara Rey Álvarez studied psychology and philosophy in London and Brussels in the mid-1920s. There she interviewed Emmeline Pankhurst, and met Louise Van Den Plas and other European suffragists.

She returned to Uruguay in 1928, and joined the Uruguayan Women's Suffrage Alliance. In a series of 1928 conferences she distinguished three 'currents' in psychology – behavioral psychology, Gestalt psychology and Freud's 'psychology of the unconscious' – and attempted to apply psychology to the problem of young offenders. In 1929 she became a member of the Council for the Protection of Delinquents and Minors, trying to change how women's prisons and asylums were managed.

In 1932 she cofounded the League for Women's Rights, and was the League's president. The following year she launched the Independent Democratic Feminist Party (Partido Independiente Democratico Femenino, or PIDF). Throughout the 1930s she continued propagating her ideas through the PIDF's publication, Ideas y Acción. However, after a poor showing in the 1938 Uruguayan general election, the PIDF was disbanded.

== Works ==
=== Non-fiction ===
- 'José E. Rodó ou l'individualisme harmonieux'. Inst. de Hautes Etudes, Brussels. 1924.
- Psychologie differentielle des sexes. Brussels: Revue Sincère, 1925.
- 'Les antinomies entre l'individu et la société'. Revista de Filosofía, Vol. 25, No. 3 (May 1927), pp. 318–357.
- 'La literatura femenina en el Uruguay'. Londres. 1927.
- 'Sobre creación de una Colonia Educacional para niñas y adolescentes'. Montevideo. 1927.
- 'La posición actual de los problemas psicológicos', Anales de la Universidad (1928)
- 'La reeducación de los menores'. Montevideo. 1928.
- 'Contribuciones de la Psicología a la Pedagogía', Anales de Instrucción Primaria (1928).
- 'Sobre creación de un Laboratorio de Investigaciones Psicológicas', Anales de Instrucción Primaria, vol. 24 (1928), p. 365
- 'El Maestro Vaz Ferreira y la autonomía personal'. Montevideo, 1929.
- 'Paradojas sin consecuencias', La Pluma, vol. 11 (April 1929), pp. 14–15
- 'Paradojas sin consecuencias', La Pluma, vol. 13 (October 1929), pp. 85–86
- 'El freudismo en la literatura contemporánea', Anales de Instrucción Primaria (1930)
- Introdución a la psicología. Montevideo: Imprenta Latina, 1932.
- 'El voto femenino y su significado', Ideas y Acción, 5 June 1933
- 'La eugenesia en pro del racismo', Ideas y Acción, I, p. 3, 1934.
- 'Consideraciones a proposito de la novela contemporanea', Revista Ensayos 19 (August 1938), pp. 8–24
- 'Los derechos civiles de la mujer'. Montevideo. 1939.
- 'Plan de enseñanza para los cursos de Filosofía', Revista Educación y Cultura (1939)
- 'La enseñanza vocacional en la enseñanza primaria y secundaria', Revista Educación y Cultura (1939)
- 'La coordinación de estudios en la enseñanza secundaria', Revista Educación y Cultura (1940)
- 'Memorándum sobre Orientación y Finalidades de una cátedra de Ciencias de la Enseñanza'. Montevideo. 1940.
- 'Los resortes primordiales de la personalidad', Revista Educación y Cultura (1942)
- 'Sobre creación de un Seminarlo de estudios filosóficos', Revista Educación y Cultura (1944)
- Antimonias de la convivencia humana. Montevideo, 1944.
- Curso elemental de filosofía. Montevideo: Medina, 1947. 2nd edition, 1949.

=== Novels ===
- Proyecciones. Montevideo, 1936.
- Refugio en el Bullicio. Montevideo, 1942.
