= Alicia Porro Freire =

Uruguayan poet, librarian, and composer

- Born: 17 May 1908; Montevideo, Uruguay
- Died: 24 November 1983 (aged 75)
- Occupations: poet, librarian, composer
- Spouse: Mario Artigas Maciel
- Children: 4
- Writing career
- Pen name: Tacón de Fierro
- Language: Spanish
- Period: 1925–1978

Alicia Porro Freire, also known as Alicia Porro Freire de Maciel, was a Uruguayan poet, librarian, and composer. She published four collections of poetry, the first before she turned 18. Porro Freire trained as an obstetrician and a librarian, and founded the school magazine Compañeros, which grew to a circulation of more than 20,000. She composed music under the pseudonym "Tacón de Fierro", meaning "iron heel".

== Biography ==
Alicia Porro Freire was born on 17 May 1908 in Montevideo, to Francisco Porro and Fermina Freire.

Already in the late 1920s, Porro Freire was becoming known for her poetry. She published two books of poetry, Savia Nueva and Polen, in 1925 and 1928 respectively. In 1928 she also published Eva, a collection of short stories.

Porro Freire studied obstetrics at the University of the Republic in Montevideo, graduating in 1938. From 1937 to 1956, she was in charge of the Children's Library No. 1 of the Uruguayan Council of Primary Education. In 1943 she joined the first class of the Escuela de Bibliotecnia del Uruguay, graduating as a librarian in 1945, the same year that she established the Centro Orientador del Periodismo Escolar.

In 1941 Porro Freire founded Compañeros, a school magazine which by the 1970s had a circulation of more than 20,000 copies, and which was praised by Martín Echegoyen in a 1959 session of the National Council of Government for its "spiritual and moral" influence. She also founded a journalism course for Montevideo school students in 1945, that took place annually from 1945 to 1955. Porro Freire also created the "Legion of the Little Green Soldier" (Spanish: Legión del Soldadito Verde), a public health organisation for children that taught the benefits of vaccination and the dangers of smoking and drinking.

In 1969 Porro Freire published Mario, a book of poetry dedicated to her husband Mario Artigas Maciel. In 1972 she registered the pseudonym "Tacón de Fierro" (Spanish for "iron heel") which she used to publish music that she had composed. La Puerta Entreabierta, a collection of her poetry and song lyrics, was published in 1978.

Porro Freire died on 24 November 1983, at the age of 75.

== Works ==
Poetry

- Savia Nueva (1925)
- Polen (1928)
- Mario (1969)
- La Puerta Entreabierta (poetry and lyrics, 1978)

Fiction

- Eva (Short story collection, 1928)

Non-fiction

- "Periodismo Escolar en el Uruguay" (essay, 1946)
