= Mirta Macedo =

Uruguayan social activist

Mirta Macedo (6 July 1939 - 25 July 2012) was an Uruguayan social worker, writer and human rights activist. She is best known for her writing, some of which focus on her time as a political prisoner in Montevideo. Macedo also worked to expose the torture and sexual abuse that she and other women faced in prison.

== Biography ==
Macedo was born on July 6, 1939, in Treinta y Tres. Growing up in Treinta y Tres, Macedo felt that there were many problems in the city that needed attention. When she was 20, she moved to Montevideo and started studying at the Escuela de Servicio Social. She also joined the Unión de Jóvenes Comunistas. Macedo became a militant communist. She was also involved in Frente Ampilo (Broad Front).

Macedo was arrested by the Órgano Coordinador de Operaciones Antisubversivas (OCOA) in October of 1975. She was taken with a group of prisoners to one of the military prisons. Between 1975 and 1981, Macedo was held as a political prisoner. During her time in prison, she and the others were tortured in various ways. In her book, Tiempos de ida, tiempos de vuelta (2002), she discusses her time as a prisoner. Her 2005 book, Atando los tiempos: Reflexiones sobre las estrategias de sobrevivencia en el Penal de Punta de Rieles, 1976-1981, describes how women coped with surviving in the Punta de Rieles prison. In 2011, Macedo, along with three other former prisoners, testified on the television show, Esta boca es mía that they had been sexually assaulted in prison. Macedo and the other women held as political prisoners accused and filed a complaint against more than 100 people in the prisons of rape and sexual abuse.

Macedo died on July 24, 2012. The collection of essays, Las Laurencias (2012) compiled by Soledad González Baica and Mariana Risso Fernández, was dedicated to Macedo.

== Selected bibliography ==
- De la prisión a la libertad: Reflexiones sobre los efectos sociales de la prisión. Montevideo: Orbe Libros. 2008. ISBN 9789974661424.
- Atando los tiempos : reflexiones sobre las estrategias de sobrevivencia en el Penal de Punta de Rieles, 1976-1981. Montevideo: Orbe Libros. 2005. ISBN 9789974661165.
- Tiempos de ida, tiempos de vuelta. Montevideo: Orbe Libros. 2002. ISBN 9789974661059.
- Un día, una noche-- todos los días. Montevideo: Orbe Libros. 1999. ISBN 9789974661011.
