= Gabriela Onetto =

Uruguayan writer and philosopher (born 1963)

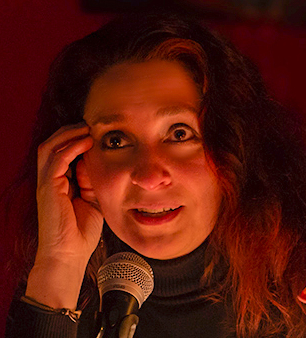
- Gabriela Onetto in 2014.
- Born: 28 October 1963 (age 62); Montevideo, Uruguay
- Education: Universidad de la Repúblic
- Occupations: writer, philosopher
- Awards: Onetti Prize

Gabriela Onetto (born 28 October 1963) is a Uruguayan writer and philosopher.

== Biography ==
She was a member of the Uruguayan "Mario Levrero in Virtual Letters" (literary motivation workshops online according to the writer's didactics) until Levrero's death in 2004. She also carried out her own proposals of literary motivation and personal exploration around autobiography, dreams and mythology as creative stimuli.

She has coordinated literary motivation workshops in person and online since 2000. She lived in the cities of Guanajuato and Querétaro before having her son Astor and returning to Uruguay in April 2005.

== Works ==
- Espiar/Expiar (poesía). Editorial Banda Oriental. Montevideo, 2015.
- Montagú (novela). Editorial Trópico Sur. Montevideo, 2014.
- El papel y el placer (antología). Editorial Irrupciones. Montevideo, 2013 (con traducción al portugués, O papel e o prazer, Editorial Beca. São Paulo, 2014).
- TCQ/7 (antología de 100 minificciones seleccionadas). Editorial La Máquina de Pensar. Montevideo, 2013.
- 22 mujeres + (antología). Editorial Irrupciones. Montevideo, 2013.
- Historia de mujeres con hormonas (antología). Editorial Aguilar/Santillana. Montevideo, julio de 2008.
- El mar de Leonardi y otras humedades (relatos). Ediciones de la Banda Oriental. Montevideo, enero de 1998
- La Comedia Latinoamericana: turistas y pobladores en América Latina (CD Rom). Gris Ediciones. Montevideo: septiembre de 2003
- Textos literarios en revistas: Marejada (Piriápolis/noviembre de 1996), Posdata (Montevideo/marzo de 1997), Universo de El Búho (México/septiembre de 2002), El Petit Journal (México/enero y agosto de 2005), Dixit (UCU, Montevideo, septiembre de 2007)
- Columna mensual, El otro monte, en la revista mexicana Replicante
- Blog El libro de los pedacitos mágicos (creado en el 2004, a raiz de la muerte de Mario Levrero).
