= Susana Olaondo =

Uruguayan writer and illustrator

- Born: 27 May 1953 (age 71); Montevideo, Uruguay
- Occupation(s): Writer, illustrator
- Known for: Children's literature
- Awards: Bartolomé Hidalgo Prize (2010); Golden Book Award (2016)
- Website: susanaolaondo.com.uy

Susana Olaondo (born 27 May 1953) is a Uruguayan writer and illustrator.

== Biography ==
Susana Olaondo was born in Montevideo in 1953. She studied drawing, painting, photography, sculpture, and introduction to visual and technical language in gardening, and graduated from the Municipal School of Gardening. Since 1990 she has held a plastic expression workshop for children where creativity is encouraged. The author highlights her versatility by writing her own stories and illustrating them. She initially started writing and drawing for her two children. In 1990 she illustrated her first book, La Tía Merelde, and since then has continued to work in children's literature. Several of her books have been published and translated in the United States and Chile. She has published several works, including an audiobook for the Braille Foundation of Uruguay.

The author has demonstrated her passion for nature, plants and animals, taking these elements as inspiration to reflect on later in her books. Some of her stories (Felipe, Olegario, Una Pindó) have been theatrically adapted.

== Awards and recognitions ==
- 1997, 2nd National Literature Prize for children and young adults for Felipe
- 1998, 1st National Literature Prize for children and young adults for Un cuento de papel
- 2000, Honorable mention for Apenas un color from the Ministry of Education and Culture of Uruguay (MEC)
- 2002, Honorable mention for Uno de conejos from the MEC
- 2004, 1st mention for Una Pindó from the MEC
- 2006, 2nd National Literature Prize for children and young adults for Palabras (shared with writer Magdalena Helguera)
- 2008, Honorable mention for Gato negro, gato blanco from the MEC
- 2010, Bartolomé Hidalgo Prize for Por un color, "for encouraging reading in images, where text and illustration coexist, and the ethical and aesthetic function of Children's and Young People's Literature are combined"
- 2016, Golden Book Award for Los patos que no tiene ombligo

== Works ==
Year	Title	ISBN	Publisher	Notes
1990	La Tía Merelde		Ediciones Mosca Hnos.	
1992	Te lo dije Nino		Ediciones Mosca Hnos.	
1992	Olegario un bicho de luz apagado		Ediciones Mosca Hnos.	
1994	Un Pato		Ediciones de autor	
1994	Violeta		Ediciones de autor	
1994	Vamos		Ediciones de autor	
1995	La radio de Don Marío		Braille Foundation of Uruguay	Audiobook
1996	Felipe	ISBN 9974590345	Alfaguara	
1997	Una Luna	ISBN 9789974954007	Alfaguara	
1998	Un cuento de papel	ISBN 9789974954014	Alfaguara	
2001	Julieta: ¿Qué plantaste?		Alfaguara	
2001	Violeta	ISBN 9974671280	Alfaguara	Reissue
2002	Uno de conejos	ISBN 9974671299	Alfaguara	
2002	Cuentos para contar		Asociación Ser del Uruguay	Proceeds donated to Hospital Pereira Rossell
2003	Una Pindó	ISBN 9974671604	Alfaguara	
2004	Olegario	ISBN 9974671892	Alfaguara	Reissue
2004	Meleté	ISBN 9974323533	Trilce	
2004	Vamos	ISBN 9974323657	Trilce	Reissue
2005	Si vas a dibujar...	ISBN 9974950341	Alfaguara	
2005	La Huella	ISBN 9974323932	Trilce	
2006	El lapicito verde	ISBN 9974324114	Trilce	
2006	Palabras	ISBN 9974950864	Alfaguara	
2006	Merelde y los lunares	ISBN 9974951038	Alfaguara	
2007	Un Mago	ISBN 9789974801325	Sudamericana	
2007	Una lombriz y un águila	ISBN 9789974952508	Alfaguara	
2008	Gato blanco, gato negro	ISBN 9789974952706	Alfaguara	
2008	Meleté	ISBN 9789974953314	Alfaguara	Reissue and new format
2009	Jugamos	ISBN 9789974952959	Alfaguara	
2009	Mimos	ISBN 9789974952942	Alfaguara	
2009	¡Hay que insistir!	ISBN 9789974952331	Alfaguara	
2010	La huella	ISBN 9789974953222	Alfaguara	
2010	¡Por un Color...!	ISBN 9789974953673	Alfaguara	
2016	Los patos no tienen ombligo	ISBN 9789974732124	Alfaguara	
