= María Abella =

Uruguayan feminist

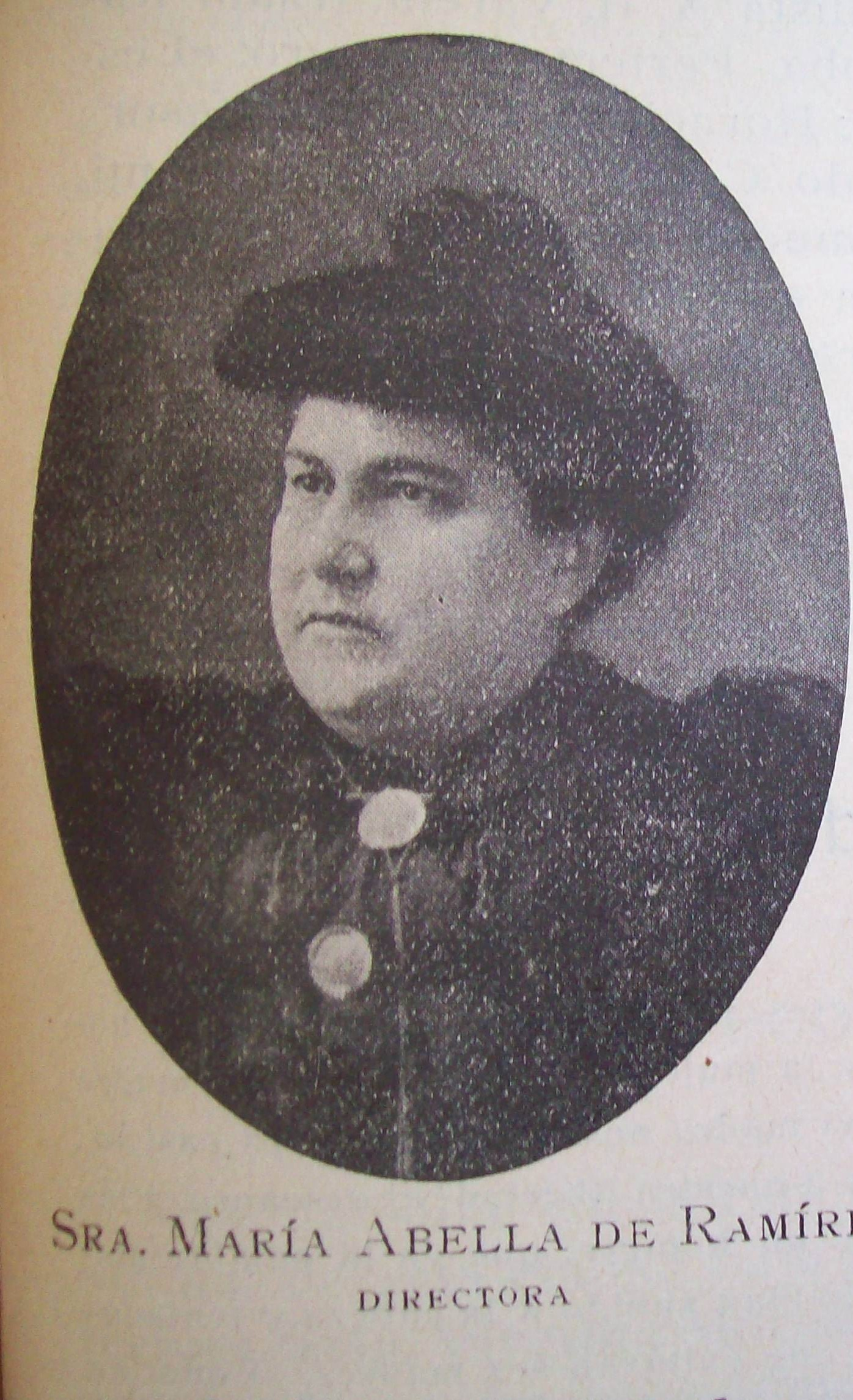

María Abella de Ramírez (28 September 1863 – 5 August 1926) was an Uruguayan feminist, noted for her role in establishing Uruguayan and Argentine women's groups in the early 1900s.

Abella published a journal, We Women (Nosotras), and was a contributor to the National Feminist League journal The New Woman.

== Life ==
Involved in the Argentine freethinking movement, in 1903 Abella supported the creation of a feminist center to facilitate discussions, later explaining her “minimum plan of female vindications” at the 1906 Freethinker Congress, arguing for equal opportunities and pay for women. She also campaigned for female divorce rights while facing opposition from the Roman Catholic Church. Even pro-divorce groups left out the female voice and body; in 1905, for instance, Oneto y Viana's proposed bill legalized divorce, but confirmed the reason as female adultery in all cases. Abella also argued that the state had no right to regulate the sex trade, which she announced in a conference in 1906: “Que la prostitución sea tolerada pero no reglamentada. La mujer soltera y mayor de edad es dueña de si misma: su cuerpo es lo que más legítimamente le corresponde: puede hacer de él lo que quiera, como el hombre, sin pagar impuestos ni sufrir vejámenes policiales." [Prostitution should be tolerated but not regulated. A single adult woman is her own master; her body is what most legitimately belongs to her; she can do whatever she wants with it, just like a man, without paying taxes or being bothered by the police]. In 1907, Abella's campaign for women's rights, particularly her argument that marriage is a union of separate bodies, helped pass new divorce laws in Uruguay and set a new legal precedent throughout early 20th-century Latin America.

In 1909, Abella founded the National League of Women Freethinkers with Dr. Julieta Lanteri, and in 1910 Abella founded the National Women's League in La Plata, Argentina. This organisation supported women's suffrage, and was aligned with the International Woman Suffrage Alliance.

== Sources ==
- Rappaport, Helen (2001). Encyclopedia of Women Social Reformers. Vol. 1. Santa Barbara, California: ABC-CLIO. p. 3. ISBN 1-57607-101-4.
- Lavrin, Asunción (1998). Women, Feminism and Social Change in Argentina, Chile, and Uruguay, 1890 - 1940. University of Nebraska Press. p. 253. ISBN 978-0-8032-2897-9.
- Howard, Walter Tomas (2011). Family Law in Uruguay. Kluwer Law International. p. 102. ISBN 978-9041136367.
- Farnsworth, May Summer. "Sex Work, Sickness, and Suicide: Argentine Feminist Theatre in the 1910s and 1920s". Hemispheric Institute. Archived from the original on 2018-12-26.
