= Aihar, Raebareli =

Aihar Aihār
- Village
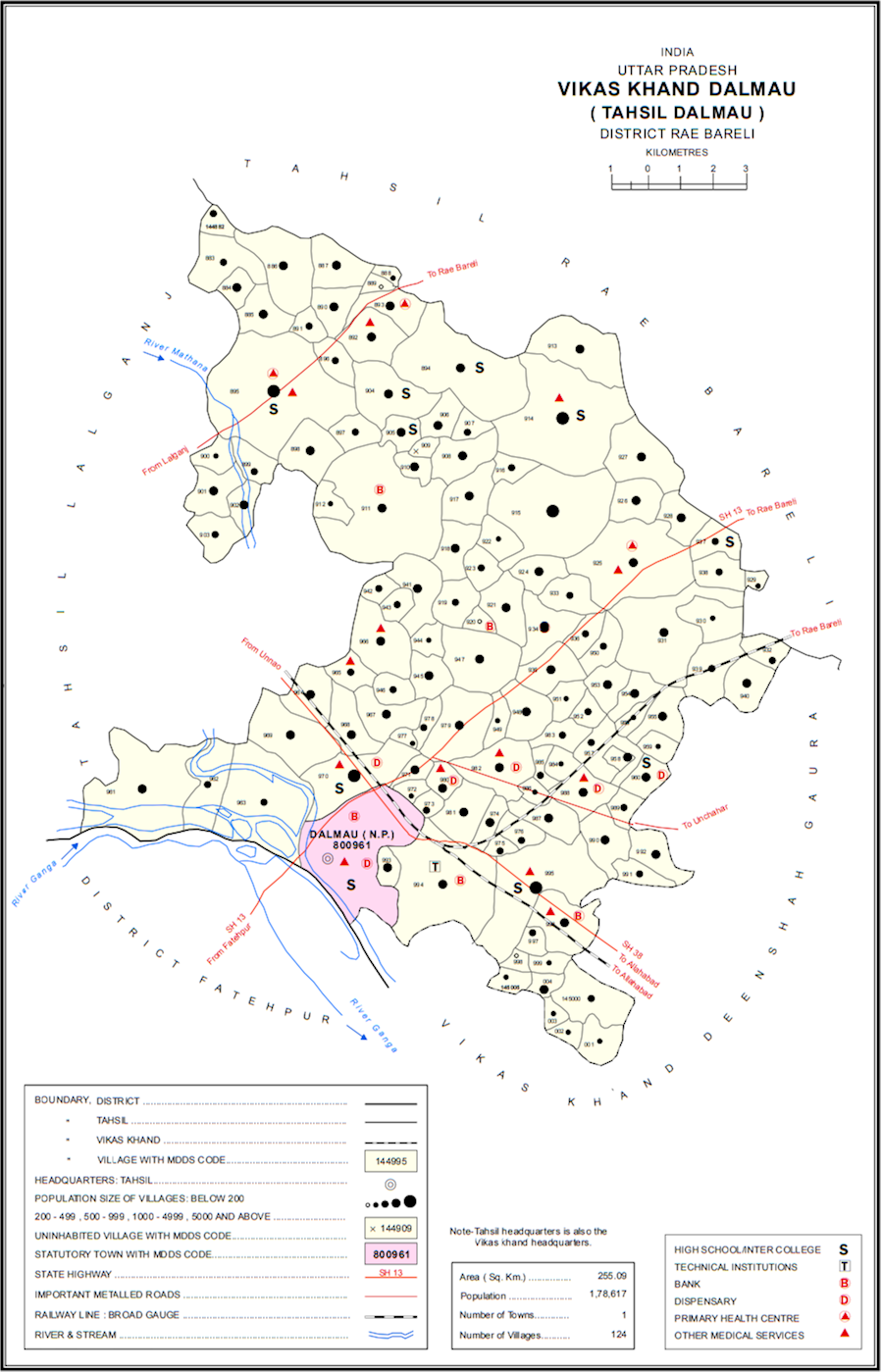
- Map showing Aihar (#895) in Dalmau CD block

- Location in Uttar Pradesh, India
- Coordinates: 26.187386°N 81.031431°E
- Country India: India
- State: Uttar Pradesh
- District: Raebareli

Area
  - Total: 10.822 km^{2} (4.178 sq mi)

Population (2011)
  - Total: 7,502
  - Density: 693.2/km^{2} (1,795/sq mi)

Languages
  - Official: Hindi
- Time zone: UTC+5:30 (IST)
- Vehicle registration: UP-35

Aihar is a village in Dalmau block of Raebareli district, Uttar Pradesh, India. Located east of Dalmau on the road from Lalganj to Raebareli, Aihar hosts a Baleshwar mela on Phalguna Badi 13 that is associated with the Shivratra festival and is dedicated to the worship of Shiva. It also hosts a market twice per week, on Tuesdays and Saturdays, specialising in cattle, cloth, and vegetables. As of 2011, the population of Aihar is 7,502, in 1,337 households, and it has 4 primary schools and 1 small clinic.

== History ==
The late 16th-century Ain-i-Akbari lists Aihar as a division of the sarkar of Lucknow. At the turn of the 20th century, Aihar was described as a large farming village, but one that was unremarkable apart from its size and age. It consisted of five mahals, each one held separately in zamindari tenure. Four were held by Bais Rajputs and the other one (the smallest) was held by a Brahmin. Aihar's population was recorded as 2,442 at the 1901 census, including a large proportion of Brahmins. The village had a large primary school and a market held twice per week. It was noted that the name "Aihar" was considered unlucky to say, and locally it was also called Nuniagaon.

The 1961 census recorded Aihar as comprising 12 hamlets, with a total population of 3,157 people (1,599 male and 1,558 female), in 609 households and 550 physical houses. The area of the village was given as 2,683 acres. It had a post office and a government-run dispensary then. Average attendance of the Baleshwar mela was listed as about 400 people at the time, and attendance of the twice-weekly market was about 100.

The 1981 census recorded Aihar as having a population of 4,707 people, in 919 households, and having an area of 1,085.78 hectares.
