= Sara de Ibáñez =

- Born: 11 January 1910
- Died: 3 April 1971 (aged 61)
- Occupation: Writer, poet, university teacher
- Children: Ulalume González de León, Suleika Ibáñez

Sara de Ibáñez (1909–1971) was an Uruguayan poet, literary critic, and educator.

== Biography ==
Ibáñez was born in Chamberlain. She was known for her "intensely lyrical poetry on topics of universal importance", such as war, the apocalypse, death, nature, and love. She employed traditional verse forms, like the sonnet, along with freer verse forms.

Ibáñez died in Montevideo in 1971.

== Works ==
- Canto a Montevideo [Song to Montevideo]. 1941.
- Pastoral. México: Cuadernos americanos, 1948.
- Artigas. 1952.
- Las estaciones y otros poemas [The seasons and other poems]. México: Tezontle, 1957.
- La batalla [The battle]. Buenos Aires: Editorial Losada, 1967.
- Apocalipsis XX [Revelation 20]. Caracas: Monte Avila, 1970.
- (ed. Roberto Ibáñez) Canto póstumo [Posthumous songs]. Buenos Aires: Editorial Losada, 1973.
