= Enriqueta Compte y Riqué =

Spanish teacher and educationist (1866-1949)

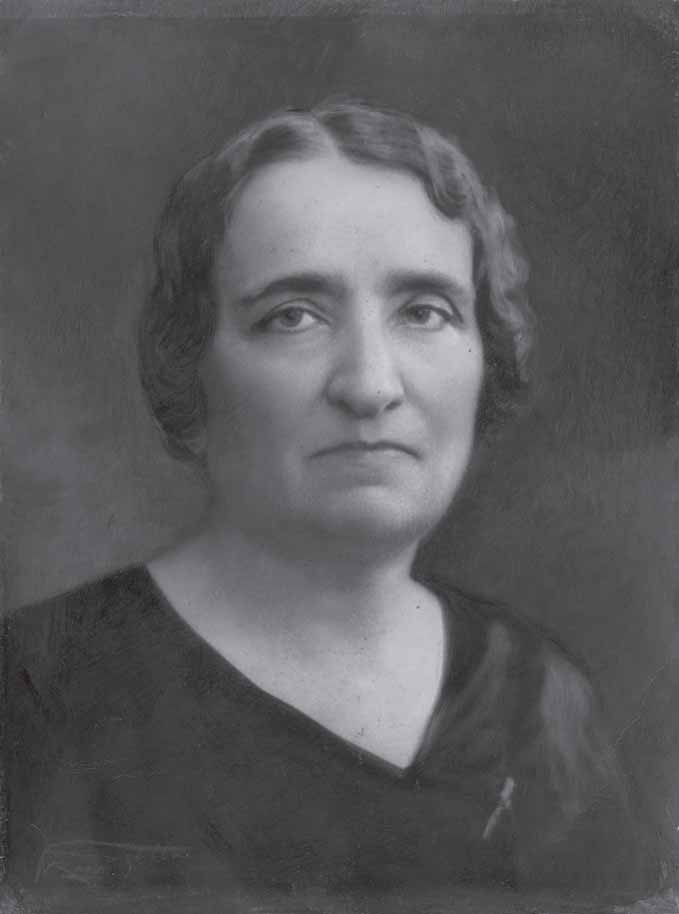
- Enriqueta Compte in 1920
- Born: 31 December 1866; Barcelona, Spain
- Died: 18 October 1949 (aged 82); Montevideo, Uruguay
- Occupations: Professor, educational theorist
- Known for: Founding the first kindergarten in South America

Enriqueta Compte y Riqué (31 December 1866 – 18 October 1949) was a Spanish-born Uruguayan teacher. She was the founder of the first kindergarten in South America in 1892, and famous for having contributed decisively to preschool teaching in Uruguay and Latin America.

== Biography ==
The daughter of Catalan parents, Enriqueta Compte y Riqué emigrated to Uruguay with her family while still a child. In spite of her nearsightedness, Compte managed to overcome her difficulties and dedicated herself to studying teaching. She graduated at 19 as a first grade teacher, and in 1886 as a superior teacher. In 1887 she was appointed deputy director of the Normal Institute for Young Women, and during that same year she traveled to Europe on an official mission for the government of Máximo Tajes, to specialize in preschool education. She was entrusted to internalize the teachings of Friedrich Fröbel, which is why she toured Belgium, Germany, Holland, France and Switzerland. She returned from this trip in September 1890. As a result of the trip, she wrote a report in which she expressed "the hope of realizing in the Republic, the creation of these establishments, approaching the ideal of Fröbel, and incorporating them into the public organization of Primary Instruction."

Compte made numerous publications in magazines and specialized books for children between three and six years of age. With psychological and pedagogical methods, her work was inclined to study children respecting their individuality and personal learning capacity.

She was also accepted into several associations whose objectives were women's rights, the fight against tuberculosis, such as the Uruguayan League Against Tuberculosis, and against alcoholism and trafficking in women.

Her work was a precursor of secular education, based on social equality and the overcoming of prejudices and obstacles that, in her opinion, were harmful for the student, but above all, for the child as a human being who did not deserve to be marked by a world full of disparities of goals and possibilities.

Her great moral principle as an educator became clear when she said:

Every time my school opens there are two anxieties I have inside, sure to be happy if I see them satisfied: one is to try something new, another to seek to correct the defects discovered the day before.

== Kindergarten ==
When the Montevideo Kindergarten was founded, it was not the same as those that served as a model for what Enriqueta observed in Europe, although some things remained. Inspired by the thinking of José Pedro Varela, it was in the end a precursor to the current policy of compulsory preschool education. It also served as inspiration to preschool teachers from several countries, including Argentina.

== Tributes ==
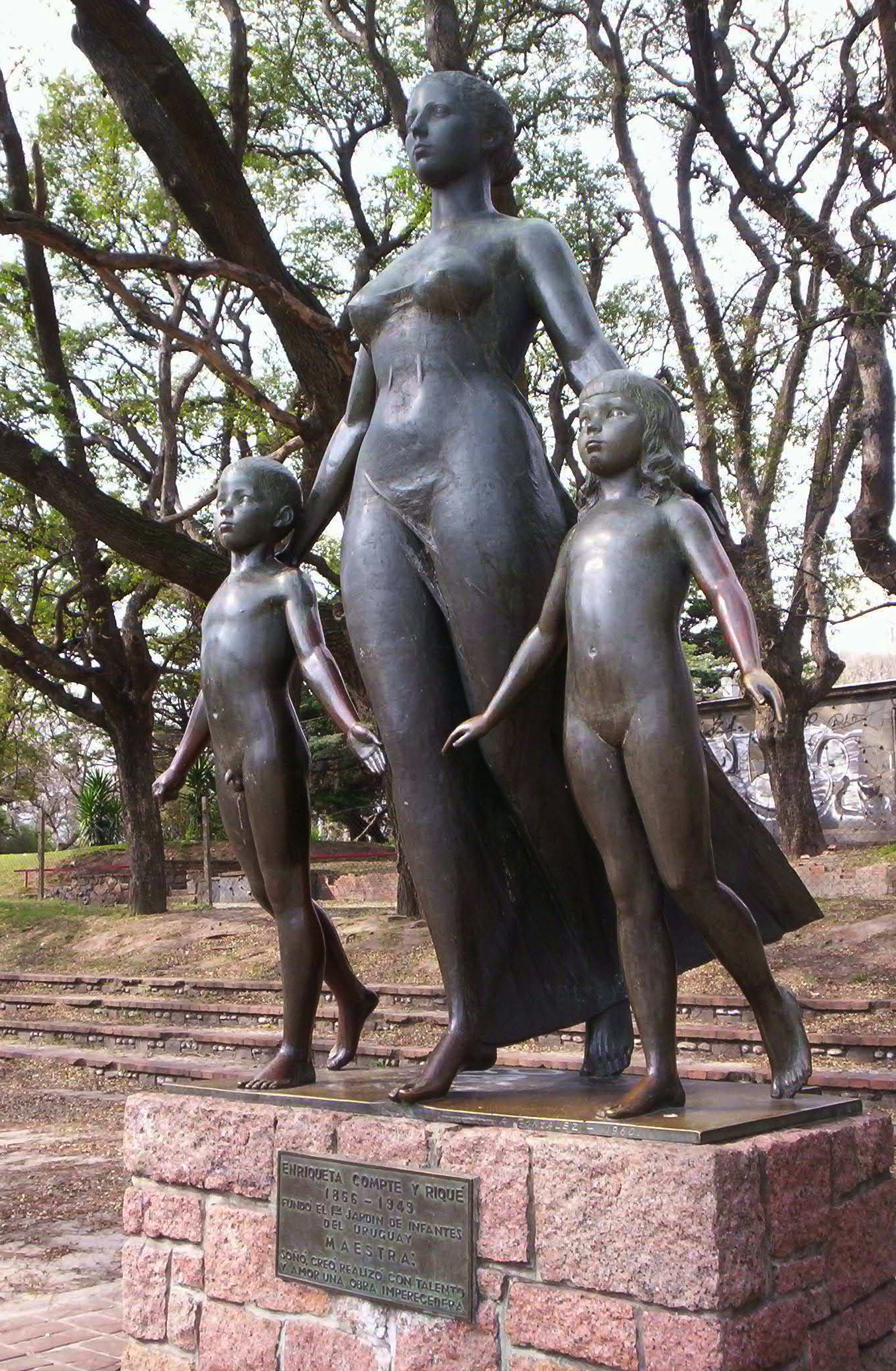
Monument located in the Children's Corner of Parque Rodó, by the Uruguayan sculptor Armando González

Currently the oldest preschool on the South American continent, Kindergarten No. 213, founded by Compte in 1892 in the neighborhood of Aguada, bears her name, as does a street in Montevideo.

On 8 March 2016, the Uruguayan Post issued a postage stamp in her honor.

== Works ==
- 1933, Lecciones de mi escuela
- 1933, Estudio y Trabajo
- 1948, Canciones y juegos de mi escuela
