= Concurso Literario Juan Carlos Onetti =

Uruguayan literary award

Premio Onetti
- Onetti Prize
- Native name: Concurso Literario Juan Carlos Onetti
- Awarded for: books in Uruguay
- Sponsored by: Intendancy of Montevideo
- Country: Uruguay
- Presented by: Intendancy of Montevideo
- First award: 1960

The Juan Carlos Onetti Literary Contest (Spanish: Concurso Literario Juan Carlos Onetti o Premio Onetti) is a literary award in Uruguay. Originally awarded in 1960, the Intendancy of Montevideo reestablished and renamed the contest after Juan Carlos Onetti, one of the most important Uruguayan fiction writers, in 2011.

== Winners ==
=== Narrative ===
- 2011: Alondra Badano, for La suerte del olvido
- 2012: Ramón Albín de María, for En olor de santidad
- 2013: Rafael Mandressi, for Siempre París
- 2014: Héctor Aníbal Uboldi, for Padre Nuestro
- 2015: Pedro Giudice, for El fractal de Julia
- 2016: Valentín Trujillo, for ¡Cómanse la ropa!
- 2017: Juan Pablo Rodríguez Laureano, for Humo
- 2018: Gonzalo Palermo Marsiglia, for Después de la guerra contra los conejos
- 2019: not awarded
- 2020: Federico Mateus Ferreira, for La inmortal del siglo XX
- 2021: Gabriela Escobar, for Si las cosas fuesen como son
- 2022: Sebastián Míguez Conde, for En el cuerpo de quién
- 2023: Manuel Soriano, for Las chicas doradas

=== Poetry ===
- 2011: Juan Adolfo Bertoni, for Está muy luz el cuello de la muerte
- 2012: Roberto López Belloso, for Poemas encontrados en la primera década
- 2013: René Fuentes, for Caballo que ladra
- 2014: Gabriela Onetto, for Espiar/expiar
- 2015: not awarded
- 2016: René Fuentes, for Periplo cerrado
- 2017: Rosana Malaneschii Delgado, for Con Anna Ajmátova
- 2018: not awarded
- 2019: Pablo Thiago Rocca, for Los cuadernos del dios Verde
- 2020: Gerardo José Ciancio Díaz, for Linaje
- 2021: Magdalena Portillo, for Catedrales Nocturnas
- 2022: Gerardo José Ciancio Díaz, for Casa de salud
- 2023: Juan Andrés Felártigas, for Ya no seremos tapa de disco

=== Drama ===
- 2011: Andrés Echevarría, for Cuando la luna vuelve a su casa
- 2012: Santiago Sanguinetti, for Sobre la teoría del eterno retorno aplicada a la revolución en el Caribe
- 2013: Sandra Massera, for Hotel blanco
- 2014: Raquel Diana, for El tipo que vino a la función
- 2015: Analía Torres Herrera, for Mancuso
- 2016: not awarded
- 2017: Álvaro Ahunchain Ramos, for Marionetas
- 2018: Federico Puig Silva, for Y
- 2019: Ignacio Revello, for Manifiesto para unicornios insatisfechos
- 2020: Alejandra Gregorio Zito, for Aquellos lugares donde
- 2021: María Alejandra Gregorio, for Acostarse a la orilla de una rajadura
- 2022: Federico Puig Silva, for El lugar donde nacen las olas
- 2023: Juan Sebastián Peralta, for Luz

=== Young Adult and Children's Narrative ===
- 2014: María Noel Toledo, for El enigma de Mona Lisa
- 2015: Gonzalo Salinas, for La niebla
- 2016: Alicia Alba Cabrera, for El club de las no besadas
- 2017: Rodrigo Castillo, for La muela del diablo
- 2018: Gonzalo Salinas, for Las danzas vírgenes
- 2019: Fernando González Rodríguez, La Reina
- 2020: Alicia Alba Cabrera, for En todas las familias nacen parientes
- 2021: Sofía Aguerre, for Adagio
- 2022: Martín Otheguy, for La feria de sueños del conde Miserias
- 2023: Edgardo Fabián Lucas Silva, for El corazón de piedra de la tía Perla

=== Comic ===
- 2014: Gabriel Ciccariello, for Sombras, el seudónimo de Arepas
- 2015: Santiago Latorre, for Un viaje soñado
- 2016 (last award): Alejandro Rodríguez Juele, for Regreso a las montañas de la locura

== See also ==
- Uruguayan literature
