= Ethel Afamado =

Uruguayan composer

- Born: 25 April 1940 (age 86); Montevideo, Uruguay
- Occupations: Singer-songwriter, poet
- Relatives: Gladys Afamado (sister)

Ethel Afamado (born 25 April 1940) is a Uruguayan composer, poet, guitarist, and singer-songwriter.

== Biography ==
Ethel Afamado's musical background includes studies of violin, bassoon, singing, guitar, and composition. She has taken theater courses with Juan Carlos Carrasco and Jorge Triador. Particularly interested in traditional Sephardic music, she has compiled material and given several recitals to showcase these old songs. She has created music for over 100 poems by Uruguayan and Hispanoamerican authors, performing numerous recitals in song with guitar accompaniment.

Afamado has also composed songs for plays, including those by Cervantes, Florencio Sánchez, and Federico García Lorca. From 1987 to 1997 she presented her recital Canción e imagen as a soloist with her sister Gladys Afamado. She has presented, among others, the recitals Mujeres, sus voces, en mi voz, Caminos de la palabra, and Canciones para sentir. She performed the show titled Canto y poesía alongside actress Maruja Santullo, and Mujeres sus voces nuestra voz with poet Lourdes Peruchena.

In 1993 she participated in the poet Jorge Arbeleche's Ágape cassette, with three of his musicalizations. In 1997 she again took part in Ágape, this time released on disc. The poems were musicalized or recited by a large number of national artists, including Andrés Stagnaro, Dahd Sfeir, Estela Medina, Antonio Larreta, Juan Alberto Sobrino, Jorge Bolani, Gonzalo Ruiz, Enrique Rodríguez Viera, and Washington Carrasco and Cristina Fernández.

== Awards and recognition ==
- 2001 – at the invitation of the Chamber of Representatives, took part in the event honoring Juana de Ibarbourou at the Legislative Palace
- 2002 – Lolita Rubial Foundation National Grand Prize for the short story "La volqueta"
