= Victoria Aihar =

Uruguayan designer

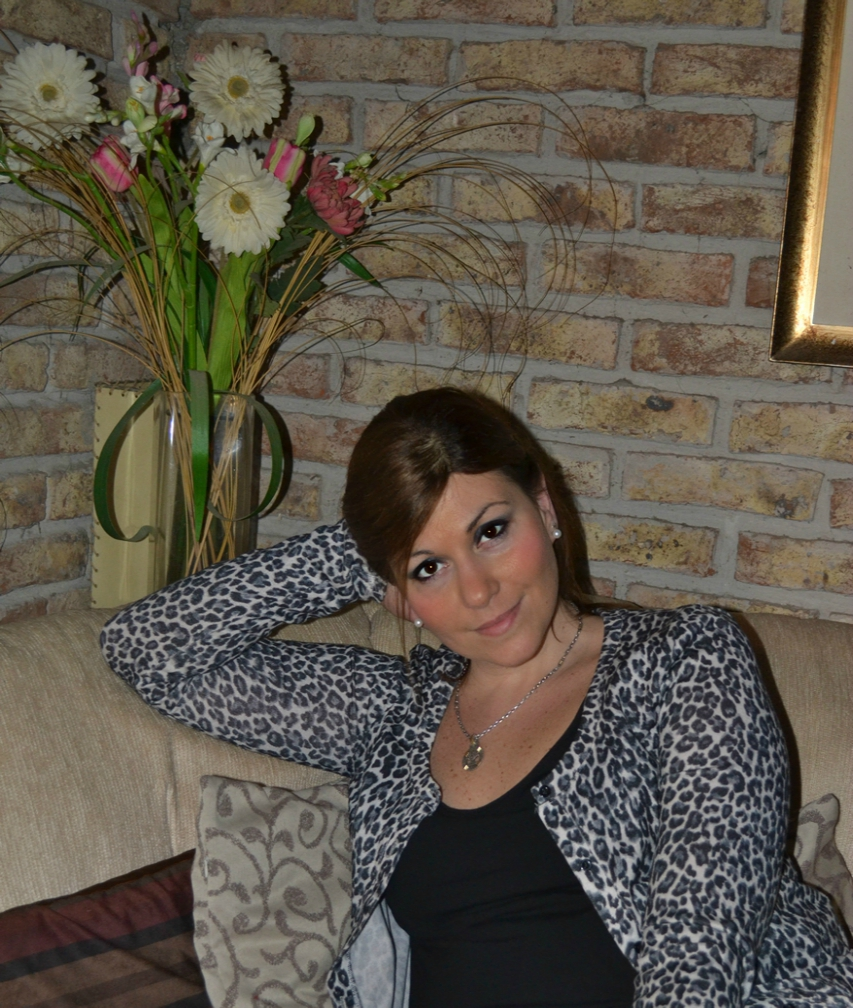
- Victoria Aihar en 2015
- Born: 19 April 1978 (age 48); Montevideo, Uruguay
- Occupations: Web designer, author, programmer
- Website: www.victoria-aihar.com

Victoria Aihar (born 19 April 1978) is a Uruguayan web designer, programmer and author.

She studied at Crandon Institute, and also studied English, French and Arabic. She graduated as a Web designer in 2001, and she is currently working as a programmer and a writer. She got married in 2000. She published her erotic novels under a pseudonym. Her books have been edited and published by Editorial Planeta in countries like Spain. The book «"Un café no se le niega a nadie"» during its presale has reached the 7th place among the bestseller ranking by Amazon Spain, even above the bestseller and sequel to "Fifty Shades of Grey" by Erika James.

== Books ==
- 2014, Una canción para Abril (ISBN 978-84-08-12622-5)
- 2014, ¿A cuántos centímetros de ti?
- 2015, Una segunda oportunidad (ISBN 978-84-08-13805-1)
- 2015, Un café no se le niega a nadie (ISBN 978-84-08-14493-9)
