= Black Native Party =

Black Native Party Partido Autóctono Negro
- Founded: May 23, 1936
- Dissolved: June 11, 1944
- Headquarters: C/ Tristán Narvaja 1300, Montevideo
- Newspaper: Pan
- Ideology: Afro-Uruguayan civil rights Egalitarianism; Anti-racism; Anti-fascism; Pan-africanism

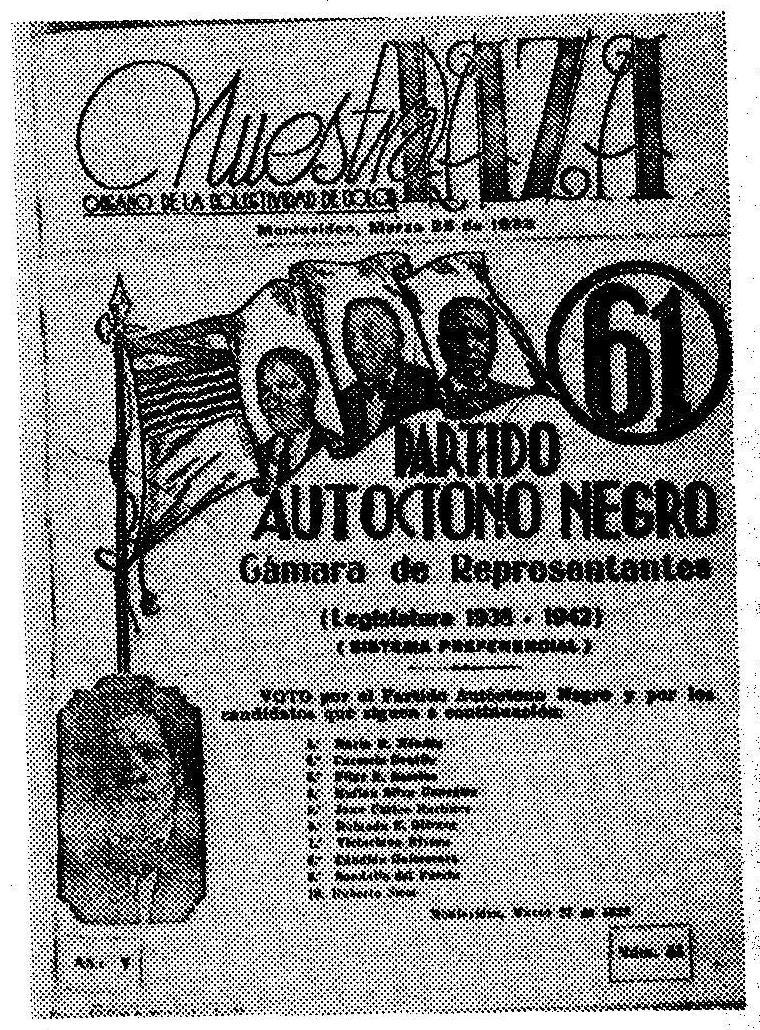
Cover of the magazine Nuestra Raza No. 55 (1938) composed with a facsimile of the electoral sheet of the Black Indigenous Party (PAN) of Uruguay.

The Black Native Party (Spanish: Partido Autóctono Negro, abbreviated PAN) was a political party in Uruguay seeking to defend the rights of the Afro-Uruguayan community. The founders of the party were Afro-Uruguayan intellectuals who sought to develop the party as a platform for electing Afro-Uruguayans to Congress. The party was founded in 1936 and was close to the Nuestra Raza group. The foundation of PAN followed the establishment of two other Black political parties in Latin America, in Cuba (1908) and Brazil (1931).

== Founding ==
A first reference of the project to launch a Black political party can be found in the October 24, 1935, issue of Nuestra Raza. The following issues of the journal carried more editorials and articles arguing for the foundation of the party. On May 9, 1936, a preliminary assembly of the party was held. Some 30 people participated in the event. Two preparatory bodies were named, a Reporting Committee and a Provisional Board. On May 23, 1936, the manifesto of the party (drafted by the Reporting Committee) was adopted at a party meeting. The manifesto of the party was formulated along the Popular Front lines, calling for struggle against fascism and imperialism.

Salvador Betervide was the founding chairman of the party. Other founders included Ventura Barrios and Elemo Cabral. After Betervide's death from tuberculosis in 1936, the chairmanship of the party was taken over by Mario Méndez. On January 5, 1937, the party was recognized by the Electoral Court. In March 1937, a new manifesto was issued, following similar lines as the original party manifesto.

== Local committees ==
On July 5, 1937, a local committee of the party was established in Rivera. On December 4, 1937, a General Assembly of the party was organized. On December 18, 1937, a local committee was set up in the town of Melo.

== Pan ==
The party published the journal Pan ('Bread') as its organ. The first issue was published on April 15, 1937. Nine issues were published until December 1937. Sandalio del Puerto was the editor of Pan, until being replaced by Carmelo Gentile in October 1937.

== Electoral debacle ==
On March 5, 1938, the party convention was opened. The convention was a public event. The majority of the 22 participants came from Montevideo. The convention was chaired by Victoriano Rivero, Isabelino José Gares and Félix Tejera. At the meeting a draft candidate list for the upcoming elections was presented. On the second day of the convention (March 7), 16 people participated. The candidate list was approved with Mario Méndez as the top candidate. Other candidates were Carmelo Gentile, Pilar Barrios, Rufino Silva Gonzalez, Juan Carlos Martinez, Rolando R. Olivera, Victoriano Rivero, Cándido Guimaraes, Sandalio del Puerto and Roberto Sosa.

The party failed to win major support as the majority of Afro-Uruguayans preferred to vote for either of the two main parties. The party launched a list of ten candidates ahead of the 1938 general election. The election campaign, carried out in Montevideo, centered around racial discrimination in employment in the state administration. The campaign had meager results, though, receiving a mere 87 votes. Following this humiliating experience, the party never contested elections again.

== Split ==
PAN suffered a split in 1941. A group of Executive Committee members met on August 13, 1941, and voted to demote Méndez from his post as party chairman. Effectively two groups emerged that claimed to be the legitimate PAN, the group led by Méndez and another led by Anibal Eduarte, Ignacio Suarez Peña (chairman) and Ismael Arribio. I. Bello served as general secretary of the Méndez faction. On August 15, 1941, Méndez reported to police that properties at the PAN office had been stolen by the Suarez Peña faction. The Suarez Peña group responded by appealing to the Electoral Court that they be recognized as the genuine PAN. The Suarez Peña faction held a party assembly on August 23, 1941. The declaration of the assembly was signed by 49 persons.

In January 1942 the Méndez faction adopted a party hymn, composed by Victor Irrazabal and Carlos Tarama.

On January 23, 1942, the Electoral Court declared that it would not take sides in the dispute in PAN, arguing that it was not possible to determine who was the legitimate claimant to the name PAN.

== Reunification and dissolution ==
Méndez died on June 5, 1942. Following his death the two factions were reunited in October 1942.

The party was dissolved on June 11, 1944. The few properties of the party were donated to Nuestra Raza.
