= Nuestra Raza =

Afro-Uruguayan magazine

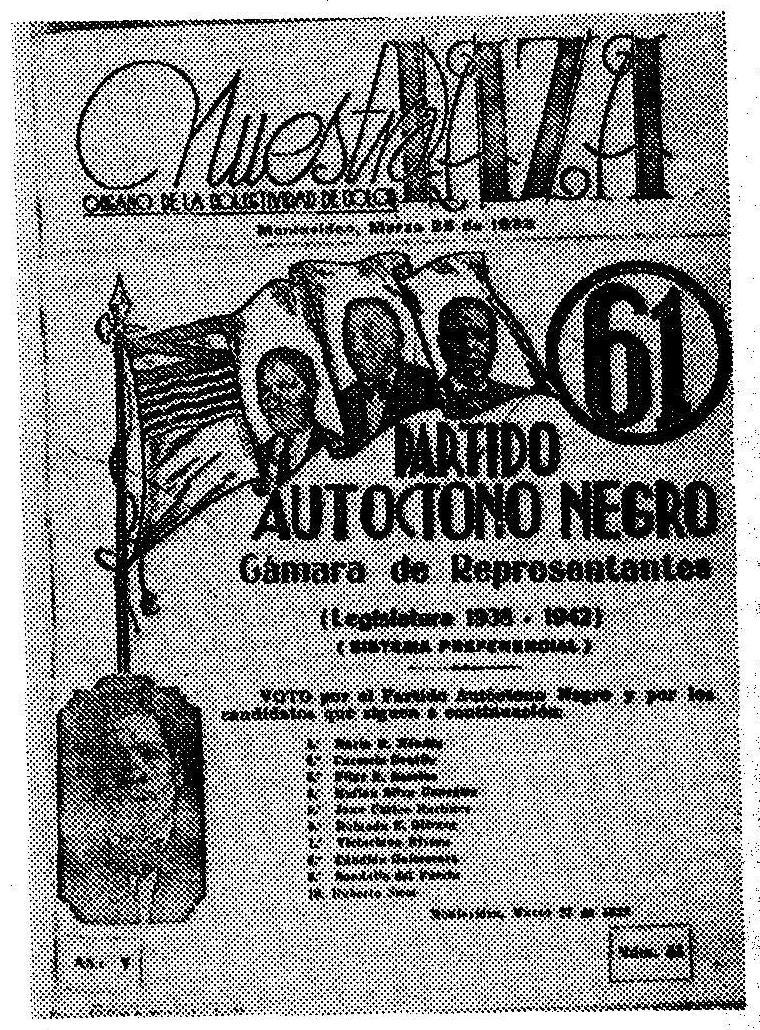
Nuesta Raza - Our Race

Nuestra Raza (Our Race) was an Afro-Uruguayan periodical. The "longest running Black Uruguayan periodical", it was published from 1917 to 1948.

It was cofounded by lead editor Pilar Barrios and his sister María Esperanza Barrios. After María died in 1932, it was refounded in 1933. It notably included contributions by several Afro-Uruguayan women, including María Selva Escalada, Iris Cabral, Maruja Pereyra and María Felina Dias.
