= Golden Book Awards =

Premio Libro de Oro
- Golden Book Awards
- Awarded for: Bestseller book in Uruguay
- Sponsored by: Uruguayan Book Chamber
- Country: Uruguay
- Website: Cámara Uruguaya del Libro

The Golden Book Award (Spanish: Premio Libro de Oro) were created to honor Uruguayan and foreign best-selling books published in Uruguay. The prizes are awarded by the Uruguayan Book Chamber (CUL).

The prizes are awarded each December in the categories general interest, nonfiction, children's and young adult fiction, and adult fiction for national and foreign books.

== 2013 winners ==
=== Uruguayan ===
- La confesión de Micaela by Cecilia Curbelo
- Hasta la última gota by Federico Castillo and Horacio Varoli
- Voces anónimas (Siniestro) by Guillermo Lockhart

=== International ===
- The One Direction Story by Danny White
- Fifty Shades of Grey by E. L. James
- Toda la verdad y nada más que la verdad by Luis Ventura
- 2012 Chinese Horoscope by Ludovica Squirru

== 2014 winners ==
=== Uruguayan ===
- La otra vida de Belén by Cecilia Curbelo
- Serás mía o de nadie by Diego Fischer
- El caso Bonapelch by Hugo Burel

=== International ===
- Historias inconscientes by Gabriel Rolón
- El juego de Ripper by Isabel Allende
- The Fault in Our Stars by John Green

== 2015 winners ==
=== Uruguayan ===
- La búsqueda de Lucía by Cecilia Curbelo
- Una oveja negra al poder by Andrés Danza and Ernesto Tulbovitz
- Educar sin culpa by Alejandro de Barbieri
- Voces anónimas (Limbo) by Guillermo Lockhart

=== International ===
- El amante japonés by Isabel Allende
- 2014 Chinese Horoscope by Ludovica Squirru
- Pablo Escobar by Juan Pablo Escobar
- Paper Towns by John Green

== 2016 winners ==
=== Uruguayan ===
- Carlota Ferreira by Diego Fischer
- La niña que miraba los trenes partir by Ruperto Long
- Los patos que no tiene ombligo by Susana Olaondo

=== International ===
- The Girl on the Train by Paula Hawkins
- Oídos sordos by Pilar Sordo
- Harry Potter and the Cursed Child by J. K. Rowling

== 2017 winners ==
=== Uruguayan ===
- Lentejas by Susana Olaondo
- Con los días contados by Claudio Paolillo
- Una historia americana by Fernando Butazzoni
- 2017 Crandon Institute Cooking Manual from the Crandon Institute

=== International ===
- Más allá del invierno by Isabel Allende
- Origin by Dan Brown
- Pablo Escobar in fraganti by Juan Pablo Escobar
- Wigetta en las Dinolimpiadas by Vegetta777 and Willyrex
- 2017 Chinese Horoscope by Ludovica Squirru
