= Premio Bartolomé Hidalgo =

- Bartolomé Hidalgo Prize
- Awarded for: books in Uruguay
- Sponsored by: Uruguayan Book Chamber
- Date: 1988
- Country: Uruguay
- Website: Cámara Uruguaya del Libro

The Premio Bartolomé Hidalgo (English: Bartolomé Hidalgo Prize) are the most important literary awards in Uruguay.

Established in 1988, they are named after Bartolomé Hidalgo, one of the founders of Gaucho literature.

== Selected recipients ==
Authors

- Roy Berocay
- Fernando Butazzoni
- Antonio Larreta
- Circe Maia
- Daniel Mella
- Juan Carlos Mondragon
- Susana Olaondo
- Mauricio Rosencof
- Daniel Vidart

Works

- El misterio de la caja habladora
- El profeta imperfecto
- Lava
- Por un color
- La vereda del destino

== See also ==
- Uruguayan literature
