= List of Uruguayan writers =

The following is a list of notable Uruguayan writers:

Name	Period	Writings	Other	Places
Delmira Agustini	1886–1914	poet		
Marcelina Almeida	mid 19th-c	novelist, writer, poet		Montevideo
Enrique Amorim	1900–1960	novelist, writer		
Dino Armas	born 1941	playwright	theater director	
Teresita de Barbieri	1937-2018	writer	sociologist	Mexico City
Ana Barrios Camponovo	born 1961	writer, illustrator	actress	Montevideo, Spain
Roberto Barry	1920-1980	writer, musician, comedian		Montevideo
Guzmán Carriquiry Lecour	born 1944	writer	Vatican employee	Rome
Mario Benedetti	1920–2009	journalist, novelist, poet		
Horacio Bernardo	born 1976	writer and philosopher		
Marcia Collazo	born 1959	novelist, poet	lawyer, teacher	
Helena Corbellini	born 1959	novelist, poet	professor	
Ismael Cortinas	1884–1940	journalist, playwright	politics	
Gerardo de Oscar	1978	writer, essayist	teacher	
Eduardo Acevedo Díaz	1851–1921	writer, journalist	politician	
Edda Fabbri	born 1949	novelist, short story writer, non-fiction writer		Montevideo
Emilio Frugoni	1880–1969	poet, essayist, journalist	politician, lawyer	
Eduardo Galeano	1940–2015	journalist, writer, novelist		
Malí Guzmán	born 1961	playwright, journalist, scenographer, writer		
Alicia Haber	born 1946	historian, art critic, curator, teacher		Montevideo
Felisberto Hernández	1902–1964	writer	pianist	
Ernesto Herrera	1889–1917	playwright, short story, journalist		
Julio Herrera y Reissig	1875–1910	poet, playwright, essayist		
Suleika Ibáñez	1930–2013	novelist, essayist, poet	teacher, and translator	Montevideo
Sara de Ibáñez	1909–1971	poet, literary critic	educator	Montevideo
Juana de Ibarbourou	1892–1979	poet		
Lola Larrosa de Ansaldo	1859–1895	writer		Buenos Aires
Circe Maia	born 1932	poet	translator	Montevideo - Tacuarembó
Jorge Majfud	born 1969	novelist, essayist	architect, prof. of mathematics and art	Tacuarembó - elsewhere
Leo Maslíah	born 1954	novelist, poet, short story, playwright	musician, singer	Montevideo - Buenos Aires
Tomás de Mattos	1947–2016	writer	librarian	Tacuarembó
Jesús Moraes	born 1955	short story		Artigas
Alvaro Ojeda	born 1958	writer, journalist, novelist, poet	reviewer	
Juan Carlos Onetti	1909–1994	novelist, short story		
Emilio Oribe	1893–1975	poet, essayist	philosopher, doctor	
Danilo Pallares Echeverría	?-present	writer	musician	Flores
Manuel Pérez y Curis	1884–1920	poet		Montevideo
Teresa Porzecanski	born 1945	anthropologist, novelist, short story writer, non-fiction writer		Montevideo
Cristina Peri Rossi	born 1941	novelist, poet, short story	translator	
Carmen Posadas	born 1953	books for children, writes for film & TV		Montevideo
Fanny Puyesky	1939–2010	books, columns, plays	lawyer	Montevideo
Horacio Quiroga	1878–1937	playwright, poet, short story		Salto, Buenos Aires
Ana Ribeiro	born 1955	historical essays, novels	professor	Montevideo
José Enrique Rodó	1872–1917	essayist		Montevideo
Mauricio Rosencof	born 1933	playwright, poet, journalist		Florida
Florencio Sánchez	1875–1910	playwright, journalist	politician	Montevideo
Ramiro Sanchiz	born 1978	novelist, short story writer	translator	Montevideo
Beatriz Santos Arrascaeta	born 1947	writer	activist, educator	Montevideo
Daniel Vidart	1920–2019	anthropologist, historian		Paysandú
Constancio C. Vigil	1876–1954	writer	publisher	Rocha, Buenos Aires
Ida Vitale	born 1923	poet		Montevideo
Giselda Zani	1909–1975	poet, short story writer	art critic	
Juan Zorrilla de San Martín	1855–1931	epic poet	politician	Montevideo
Roy Berocay	born 1955	journalist	author	Montevideo

== List of Uruguayan poets ==
- Teresa Amy (1950–2017)
- Washington Benavides (1930–2017)
- Mario Benedetti
- Amanda Berenguer
- Selva Casal
- Roberto Echavarren
- Amir Hamed
- Circe Maia
- Jorge Meretta
- Eduardo Milan
- Salvador Puig
- María Herminia Sabbia y Oribe
- María Eugenia Vaz Ferreira
- Jorge Medina Vidal
- Idea Vilariño
- Ida Vitale

== See also ==
- List of Uruguayan women writers
- List of Latin American writers
- List of Uruguayans
- Uruguayan literature
- List of contemporary writers from northern Uruguay
