= Eduardo Larbanois =

Uruguayan musician

- Born: August 1, 1953 (age 73); Tacuarembó, Uruguay
- Genres: Popular, folk
- Occupation: Musician
- Instruments: Singing, guitar
- Labels: Sondor; Orpheus/EMI; Ayuí/Tacuabé; Montevideo
- Member of: Larbanois – Carrero
- Formerly of: The Eduardos

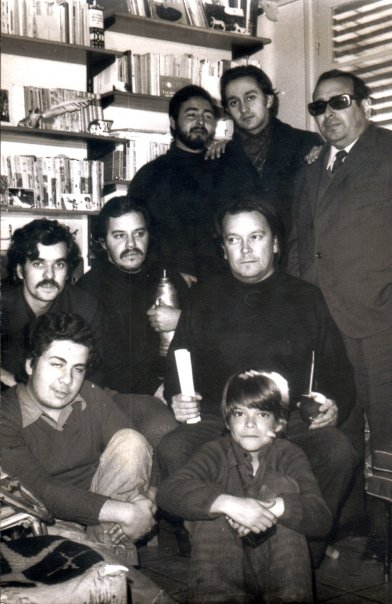
Larbanois (standing left), along with Edward Darnauchans, Washington Benavides and other members of the Group of Tacuarembo.

Eduardo Larbanois (born August 1, 1953 in Tacuarembó) is a guitarist, songwriter and singer Uruguayan of popular music, best known for integrating the duo Larbanois – Carrero.

== Biography ==
He studied under Abel Carlevaro and Stephen Klisich, among others.

== The Eduardos ==
In the early 1970s, Larbanois along with Eduardo Lago, a native of Tacuarembó, created the duo The Eduardos. At that time, the group started playing in various localities of the department and other cities in the interior of Uruguay. Since its discipline integrated a cultural movement that was called "Tacuarembó Group which also belonged", Washington Benavides, Eduardo Darnauchans, Héctor Numa Moraes and Carlos Benavides among others.

Until the dissolution of the duo in 1977, the artists recorded 3 LP and achieved some regional recognition, touring Uruguay and part of Argentina.

=== Larbanois – Carrero ===
After the separation of Edward Larbanois meets Mario Carrero, who had years before, and the duo decided to create Larbanois – Carrero.

This duo became an important reference of Uruguayan popular music, with a history of over 30 years of performances and editing more than 30 long play s. It has also given concerts in places like Australia, New Zealand, United States, Canada, Cuba, Paraguay, Brazil, Argentina, among others, and has shared the stage with a wide range of Uruguayan and foreign artists, among which are: Santiago Feliú, León Gieco Paco Ibáñez, César Isella, Joan Manuel Serrat, Daniel Viglietti, Alfredo Zitarrosa, Carlos and Enrique Mejía Godoy brothers and Pablo Milanés.

== Soloist discography ==
- Trovas por Leandro Gómez (collective album with Carlos Maria Fossati, Carlos Benavides and Julio Mora. 1978)
- Cuerdas desatadas (Strings unleashed) (2003)
- Sencillito (2004, with Pepe Guerra, Carlos Malo, Cacho Labandera, and Popo Romano)
- Mandala (2014)
