= Cuchilla de Haedo =

Hill range in Uruguay

Coordinates: 31°40′42″S 56°16′01″W

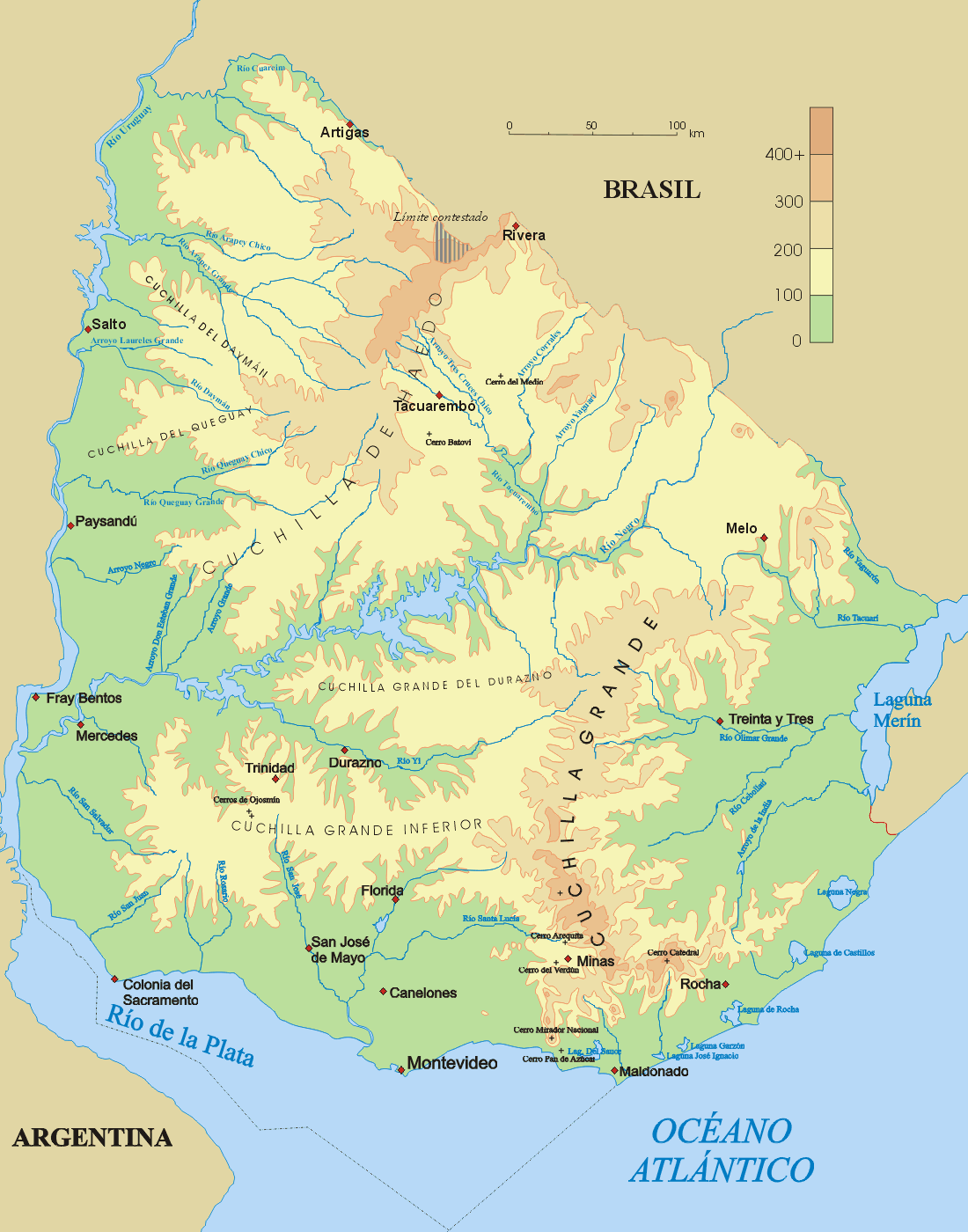
The Cuchilla de Haedo is the range in the northwest part of the map.

The Cuchilla de Haedo (Haedo Range) is a low range of hills located in the north-northwest of Uruguay, to the west of Tacuarembó, and running southwest toward Paysandú. It climbs no more than 500 m in height. This ridge is separated from the Cuchilla Grande to the south by the Río Negro valley.

== See also ==
- Cerro Batoví
