= Horacio Bernardo =

Uruguayan writer

Horacio Bernardo (born December 8, 1976) is an Uruguayan writer.

== Works ==
- “Libres y Esclavos” (Free and Slaves). Ediciones La Gotera. 2005.
- “El hombre perdido” (The Lost Man). Grupo Planeta. 2007.

=== Philosophical works ===
- "Un texto de Horacio Bernardo De la paradoja del «Todo Vale »", 1 July 2009
- Filosophia en el Uruguay
- "De la paradoja en el "todo vale" de Paul Feyerabend a la falacia de la falsa libertad". Revista Galileo No. 28, páginas 65–73. Octubre de 2003.
- " De la paradoja en el "todo vale" de Paul Feyerabend a la falacia de la falsa libertad ". A parte rei. Universidad Autónoma de Madrid. 2003.
- "¿Qué es la vida?. Un problema epistemológico". A parte rei. Universidad Autónoma de Madrid. 2004.

== See also ==
- List of Uruguayan writers
