= Cuchilla de Caraguatá =

Range of hills in Uruguay

Coordinates: 32°23′20″S 55°2′37″W

The Cuchilla de Caraguatá is a range of hills in Uruguay.

== Location ==
It is situated in Uruguay's largest department, Tacuarembó Department, in the north of the country.

=== Name ===
The range of hills gives its name to a village formerly known as Cuchilla de Caraguatá.

The word 'Caraguatá' originally referred to a local plant.

A nearby river is named the Caraguatá River.

== Featured in literature ==
'Caraguatá' is featured in the poetry of a local writer, Circe Maia. Maia has written a series of poems entitled 'Poemas de Caraguatá', containing reflections to which local topography, flora and fauna have given rise.

== See also ==
- Circe Maia § Regional background
