= Curtina =

- Village
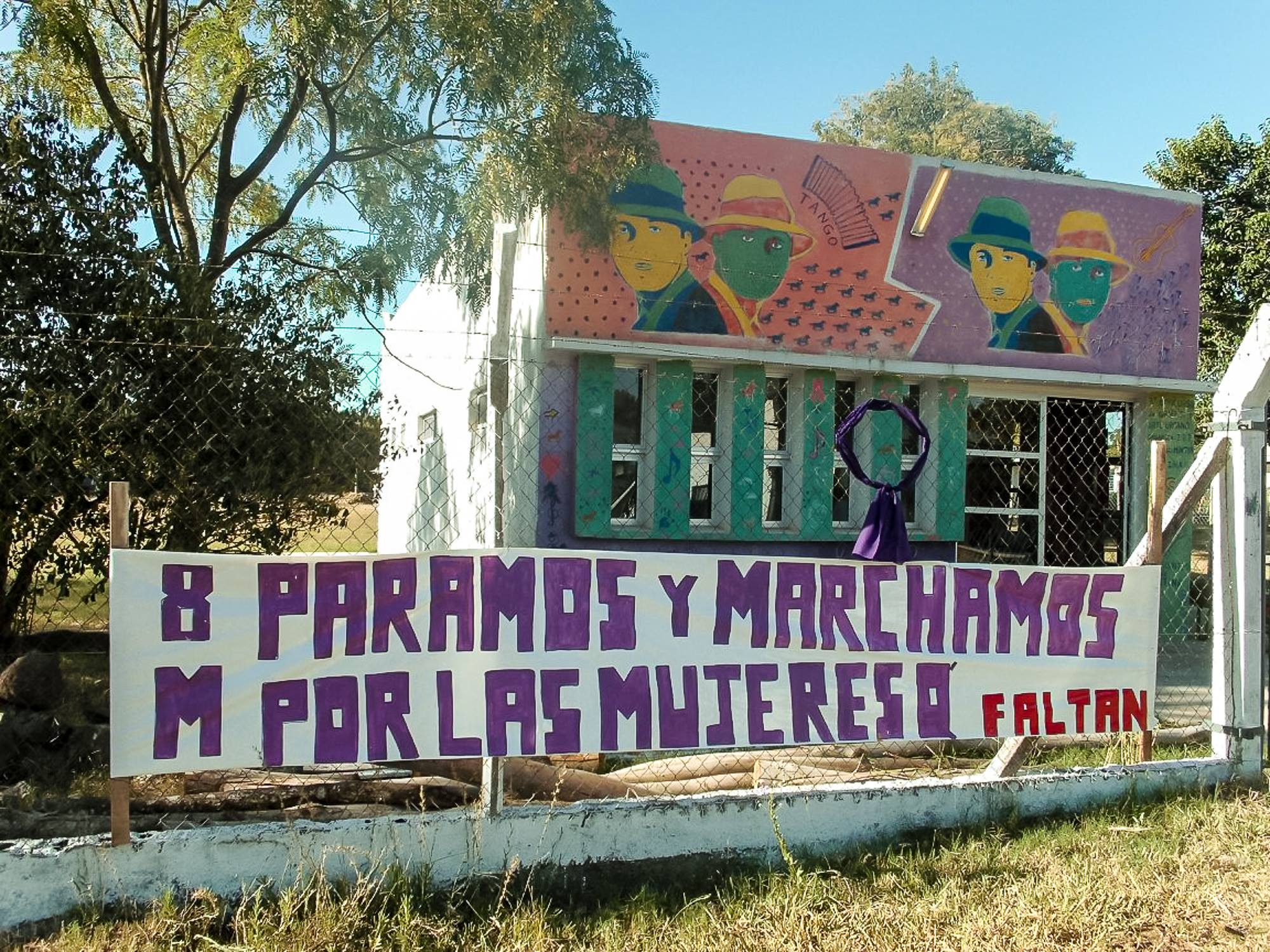
- Missing women march in Curtina

- Location in Uruguay
- Coordinates: 32°08′46″S 56°06′59″W
- Country: Uruguay
- Department: Tacuarembó Department
- Elevation: 127 m (418 ft)

Population (2011)
  - Total: 1,037
- Time zone: UTC-03:00 (UYT)
- Postal code: 45002
- Dial plan: +598 463 (+5 digits)

Curtina is a village in the Tacuarembó Department of northern-central Uruguay.

== Geography ==
The village is located on Route 5, about 53 kilometres (33 mi) south of the city of Tacuarembó. The Arroyo Malo passes by the south side of the town.

== History ==
On 5 July 1907, the group of houses formerly known as "San Máximo" was elevated to the status of "Pueblo" (village) by the Act of Ley Nº 3.189. It was the head of the judicial section of "Arroyo Malo".

== Population ==
In 2011 Curtina had a population of 1,037.

Year	Population
1908	3.666
1963	806
1975	732
1985	651
1996	843
2004	1,029
2011	1,037

Source: Instituto Nacional de Estadística de Uruguay

== Places of worship ==
The village has a church called Capilla Santa Teresita.

== Notable people ==
- Numa Moraes, Musician
- Guillermo Castro Duré, Musician
