= Valle Edén =

- Hamlet
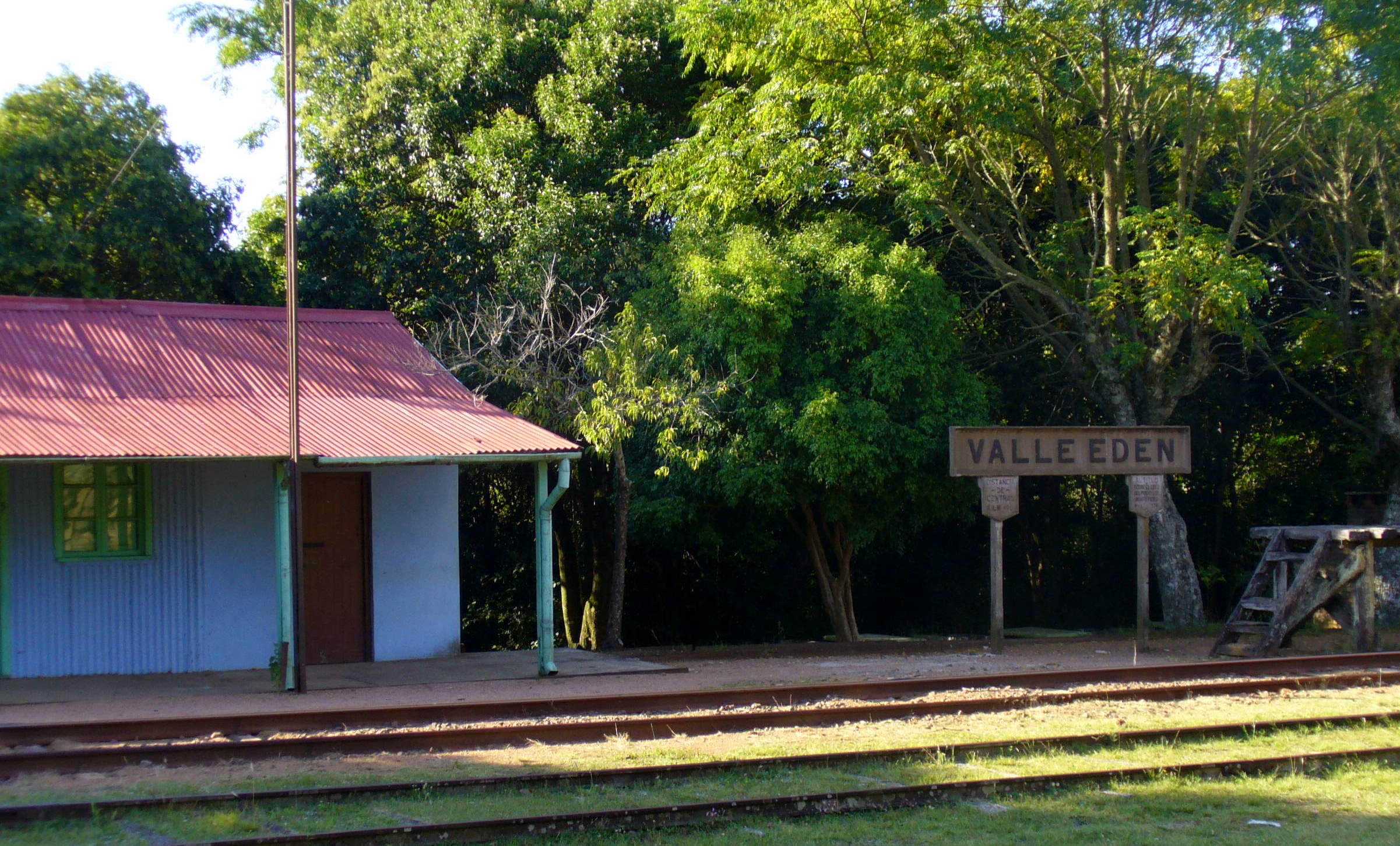
- Train station at Valle Edén

- Location in Uruguay
- Coordinates: 31°49′24″S 56°10′38″W
- Country: Uruguay
- Department: Tacuarembó Department
- Time zone: UTC -3

Valle Edén is a hamlet in the valley of the same name in Tacuarembó Department, Uruguay.

== Location ==
The hamlet is situated on the railroad track Montevideo - Tacuarembó - Rivera, about one kilometre south of km.210 of Route 26 and 25 kilometres (16 mi) southwest of the city of Tacuarembó. Its nearest populated place is Tambores, about 16 kilometres (9.9 mi) by road to its southwest.

== Landmarks ==
The hamlet includes a train station, a police station, a school (Escuela 23) and a museum, the Museo Carlos Gardel dedicated to Carlos Gardel, the famous tango singer, songwriter and actor. Uruguayans claim that Gardel was born here. Scholarly consensus is that Gardel was born in Toulouse, France.

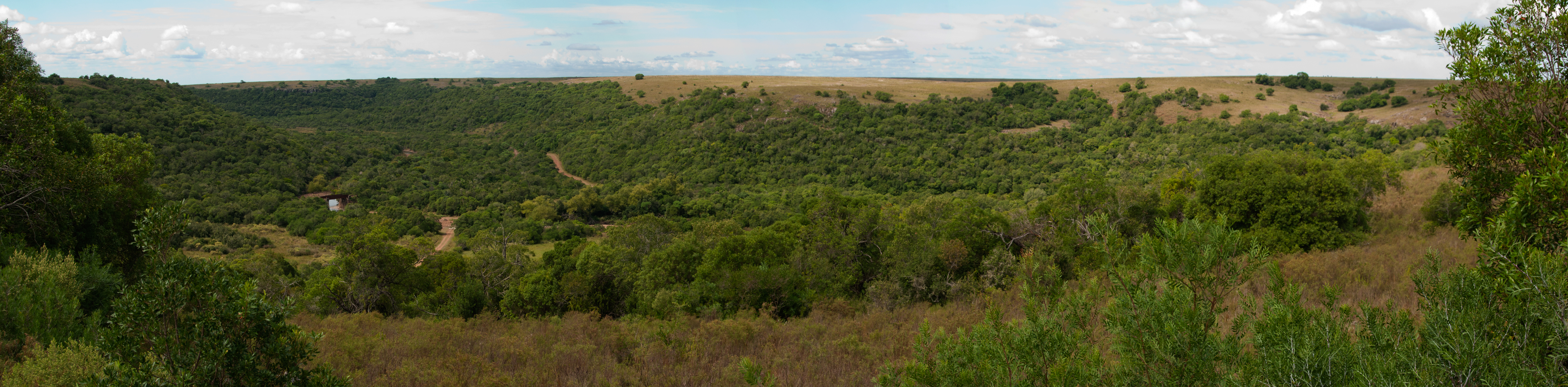
View of Valle Edén
