= List of contemporary writers from northern Uruguay =

Coordinates: 33°S 57°W

List of contemporary writers from northern Uruguay includes authors, poets, and playwrights, identified with the regions of northern Uruguay, from the times immediately preceding the struggle for independence (c.~1811) to the present day.

== Introduction ==
The culture of Uruguay is focused on urban Montevideo however, a number of contemporary writers have worked and focused on the north of the country.

Contemporary writers of northern Uruguay include:

=== Washington Benavides ===
Washington Benavides (March 3, 1930–September 24, 2017 (aged 87)) was a prolific poet, educator, and musician who was a foundational figure of the "Tacuarembó Group." Born in Tacuarembó, he eventually moved to Montevideo where he taught at the University of the Republic and served as a cultural radio programmer. His work bridges the gap between literary poetry and popular song, and he was honored with the National Intellectual Career Award for his extensive contributions to Uruguayan culture.

Major Work: Benavides, Washington (1965). Las milongas. Montevideo, Uruguay: Alfa.

- Circe Maia - (Tacuarembó)
- Jorge Majfud - (Tacuarembó)
- Jesús Moraes - (Bella Unión)
- Tomás de Mattos - (Tacuarembó)
- Emir Rodríguez Monegal - (Melo)

== See also ==
- List of Uruguayan writers
- Generación del 45
