= Paso Bonilla =

- Village
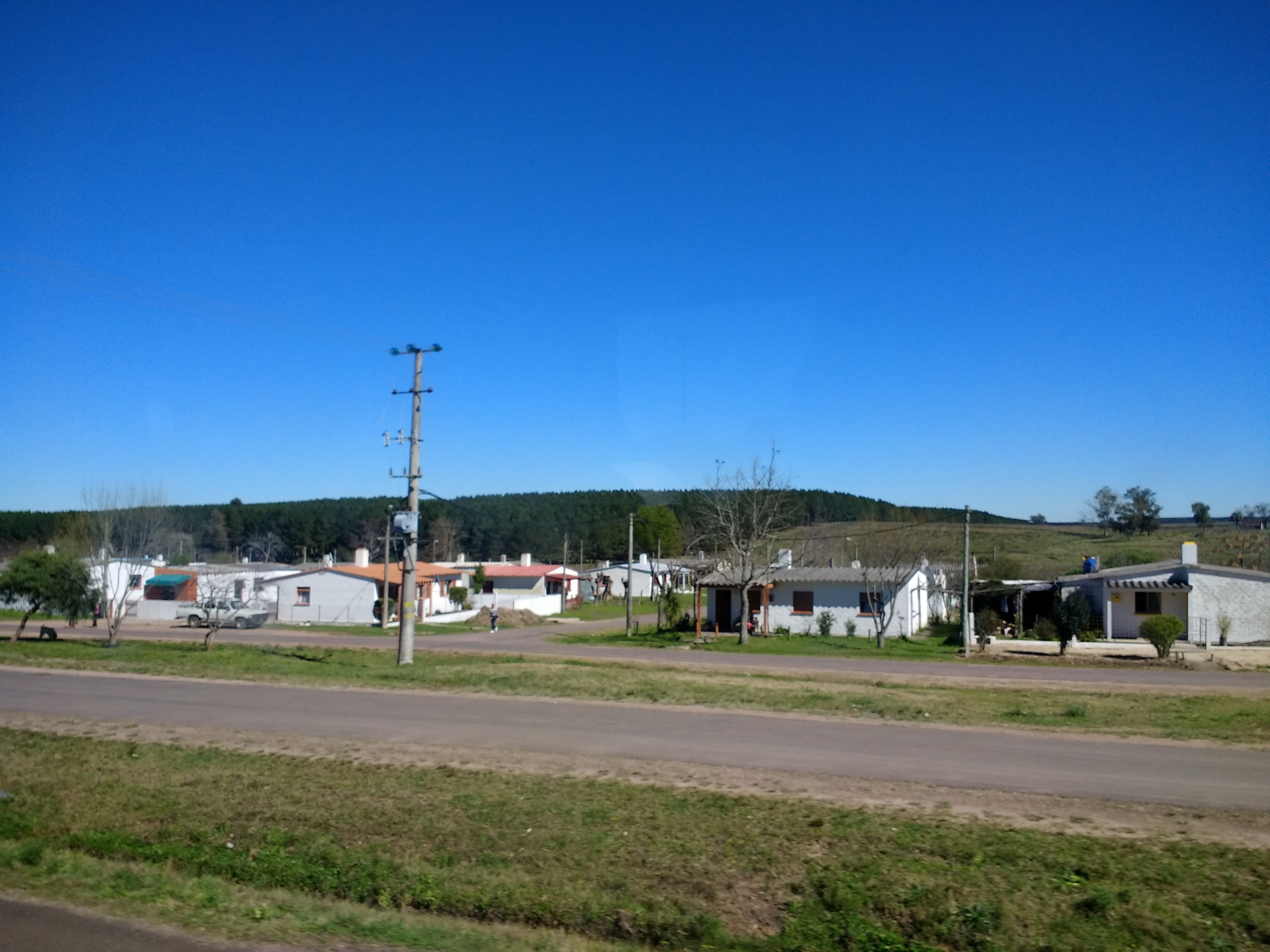

- Location in Uruguay
- Coordinates: 32°9′0″S 56°7′0″W
- Country: Uruguay
- Department: Tacuarembó Department

Population (2011)
  - Total: 510
- Time zone: UTC -3
- Postal code: 45011
- Dial plan: +598 463 (+5 digits)

Paso Bonilla is a village or populated centre in the Tacuarembó Department of northern-central Uruguay.

== Geography ==
The village is located on the junction of Route 5 with Route 59, about 10 kilometres (6.2 mi) south of the department capital city Tacuarembó. About 1.5 kilometres (0.93 mi) north of the village is the so-called "Paso Bonilla", which coincides with the actual bridge of Route 5 over the stream Arroyo Tranqueras.

== Population ==
In 2011 Paso Bonilla had a population of 510.

Year	Population
1963	74
1975	368
1985	743
1996	286
2004	445
2011	510

Source: Instituto Nacional de Estadística de Uruguay
