= Uruguayan literature =

Literature of Uruguay

Uruguayan literature has a long and eventful history.

== Beginnings ==
Literature properly speaking starts in Uruguay with the country-flavoured poetry of Bartolomé Hidalgo, 1788-1822. The two leading figures of the Romantic period are Adolfo Berro and Juan Zorrilla de San Martín.

== Modernistas ==
Julio Herrera y Reissig was one of the fin-de-siècle modernistas, two leading women are Juana de Ibarbourou, who was one of the most popular writers of Spanish America, and Delmira Agustini. Emilio Frugoni and Emilio Oribe were distinguished lyricists.

== Other important figures ==
Outstanding among the prose and fiction figures are Juan Carlos Onetti, Carlos Martínez Moreno, Eduardo Galeano, Felisberto Hernández, Mario Benedetti, Tomás de Mattos, Mauricio Rosencof and Jorge Majfud.

Horacio Quiroga was a popular playwright and short-story writer. Constancio C. Vigil was once a beloved, if highly moralistic, children's writer.

Jorge Luis Borges, while Argentine, was a commentator on the Uruguayan historical and cultural scene; some of his characters are realistically Uruguayan. Florencio Sánchez remains Uruguay's most famous theater writer.

=== Writers from Northern Uruguay ===
While many of Uruguay's writers have been primarily connected with the capital Montevideo, a number have been identified with the north of the country.

== See also ==
- (sic), the magazine of the Uruguayan Association of Literature Teachers
- List of Uruguayan writers
- List of contemporary writers from northern Uruguay
