= Giselda Zani =

Uruguayan writer

Giselda Zani (1909 in Italy – 1975 in Argentina) was a Uruguayan poet, short story writer and art critic of Italian origin. A member of the Generación del 45, she had a career as a journalist and diplomat in Buenos Aires in Argentina.

== Works ==
- La costa despierta (The Wide-awake Coast) (1930)
- Por vínculos sutiles (Tenuous Links) (1958), a collection of short stories

== Awards ==
- Emecé Literary Prize (1957)

== See also ==
- List of contemporary writers from northern Uruguay
- Uruguayan literature
