= Erika Büsch =

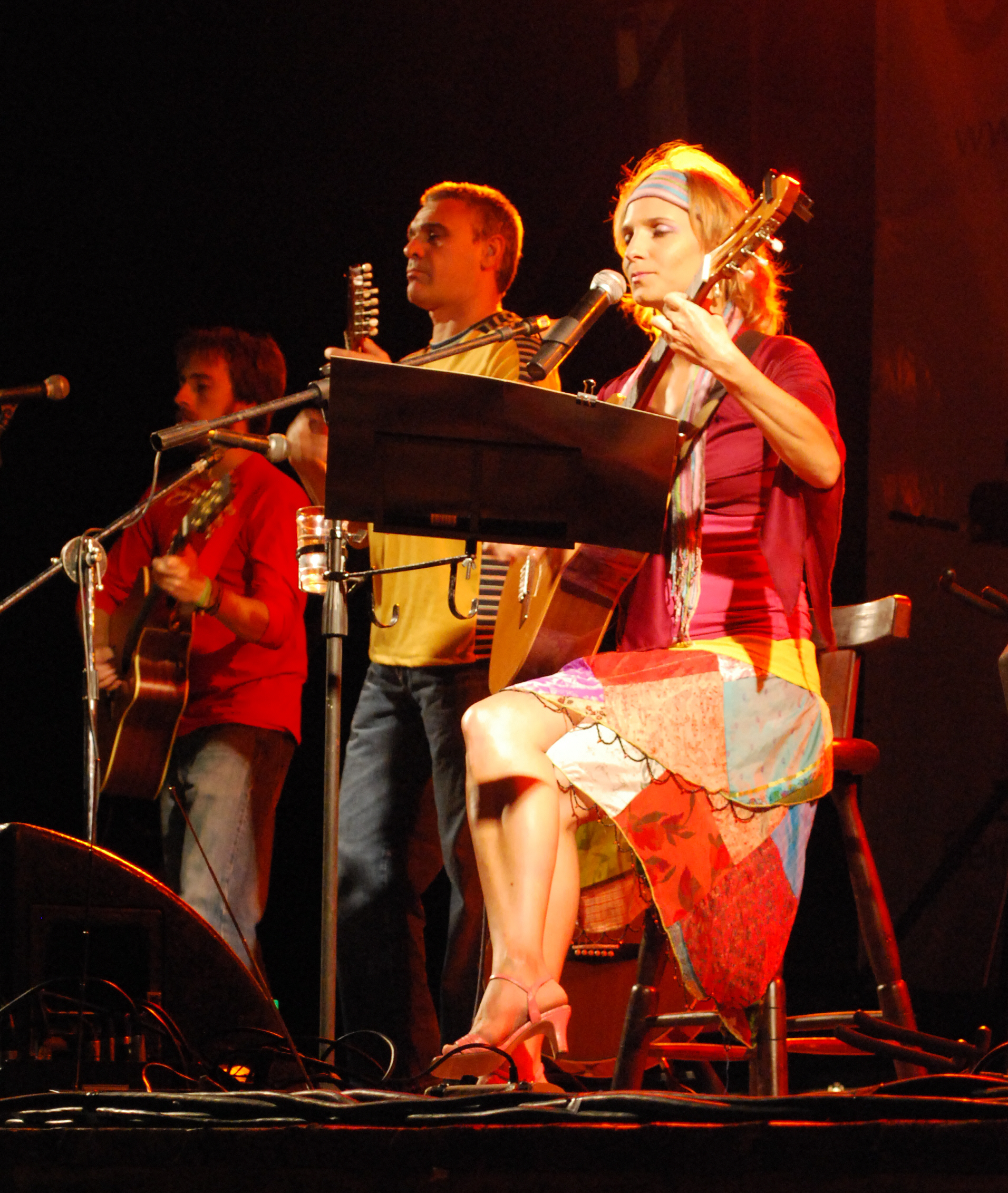
- 2009

Background information
- Birth name: Erika Büsch Guadalupe
- Born: 22 October 1974 (age 50); Montevideo, Uruguay
- Occupation(s): Composer, guitarist, singer
- Website: www.erikabusch.uy

Erika Büsch Guadalupe (born 22 October 1974) is a Uruguayan popular music composer, guitarist, and singer.

== Biography ==
=== Artistic field ===
Büsch's first artistic studies took place at the National Dance School, where she took classes in the history of dance, body expression, music reading, choreography, traditional popular culture, introduction to social sciences, and history of culture.

Later she began guitar studies with the concertists Alfredo Escande, Eduardo Yur, and Cristina Zárate. After joining the Uruguayan Popular Music Workshop (TUMP), she studied with Ney Peraza, Jorge Schellemberg and Guilherme de Alencar Pinto.

Büsch continued her studies at the University School of Music, where she specialized in guitar and choral conducting. She also studied harmony with the composer Esteban Klísich.

Subsequently, she worked on the creation of the music group workshop for children "Tucanción", and the children's animation group "Tungaitá".

=== Tocando el tiempo ===
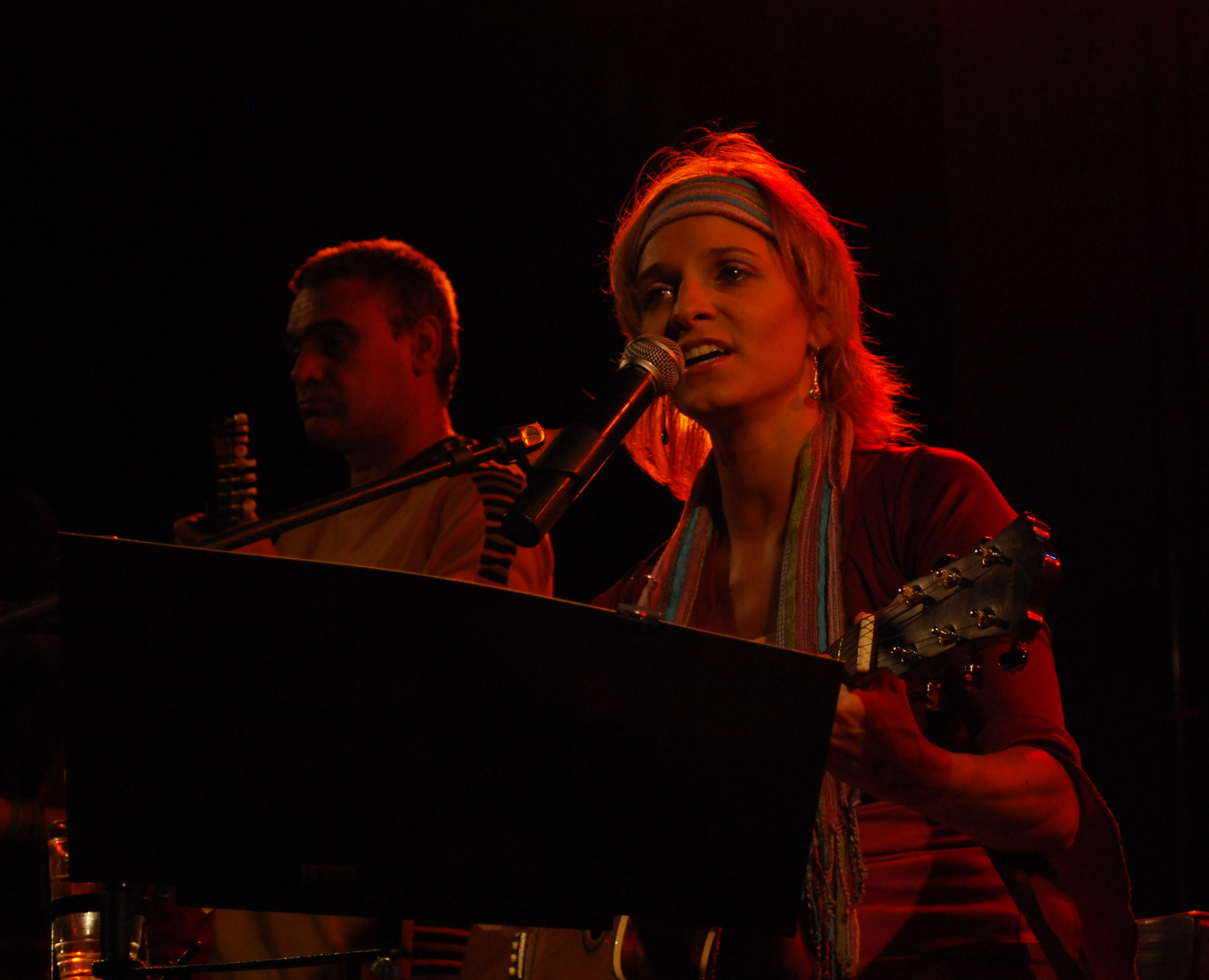
Erika Büsch at a concert in Atlántida, Canelones, Uruguay

In 2002, Büsch independently released her first adult album, entitled Tocando el tiempo. This album, that contains 14 original songs by the artist, is framed in an experimentation stage, with songs that have rhythmic bases as dissimilar as pop, tango, and bossa nova.

=== Por el gusto de cantar ===
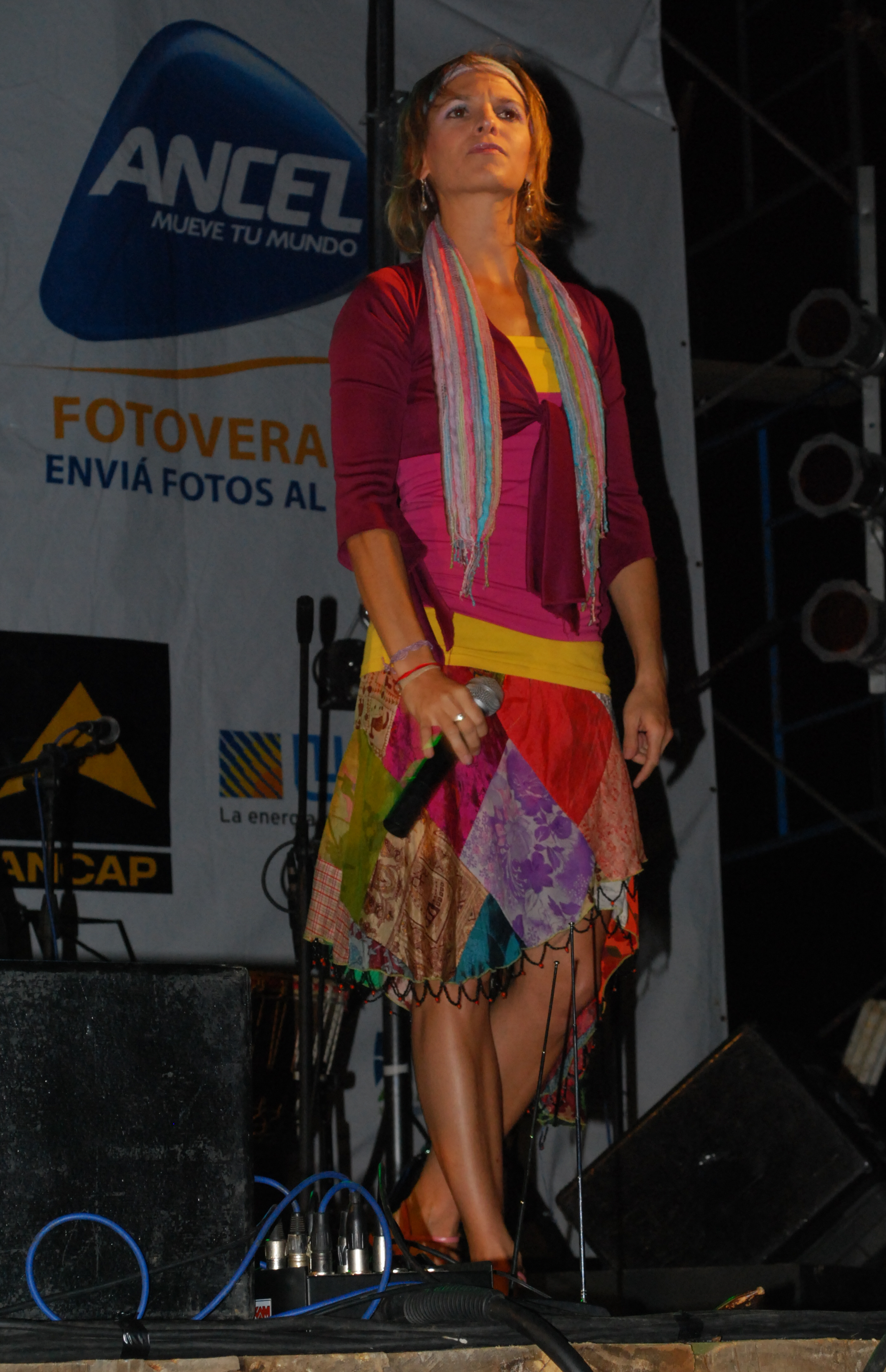
Erika Büsch at a concert in Atlántida

In 2004 and 2005, Büsch performed a series of shows with Numa Moraes entitled "Por el gusto de cantar" (for the love of singing), during which they performed at the Zitarrosa Hall in Montevideo and made a tour of the interior of Peru. The repertoire of the shows, in addition to including themes of both artists, incorporated works by different Latin American authors such as Silvio Rodríguez, Violeta Parra, Atahualpa Yupanqui, and Carlos Puebla.

In 2006, she traveled to Chile to represent Uruguay at the 47th Viña del Mar International Song Festival, where she participated in the folkloric competition. In that category she performed her song "Sinfonía Nocturna".

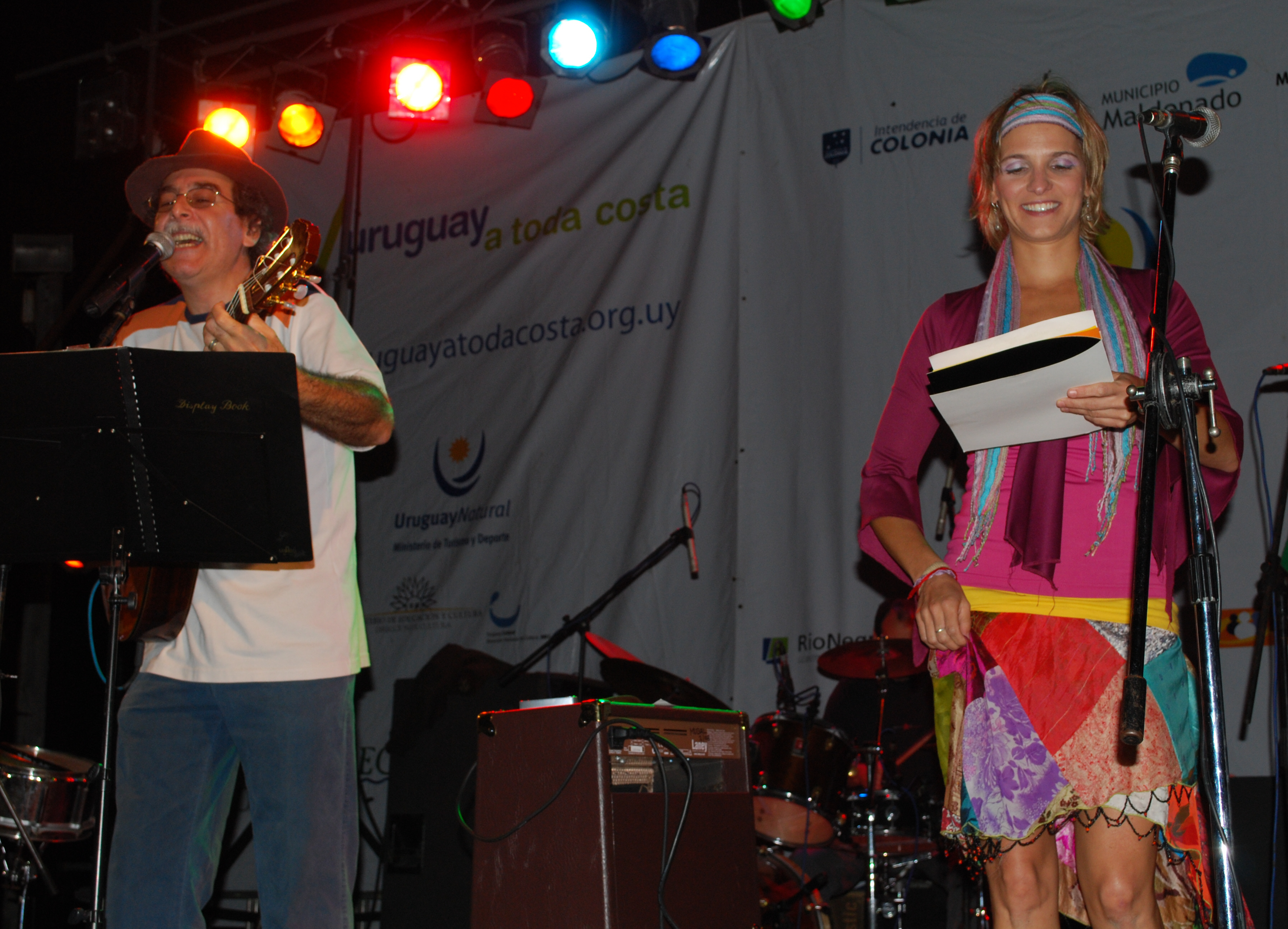
Erika Büsch and Mauricio Ubal in 2009

Together again with Numa Moraes, in 2008 she started a tour of Canada that led her to give performances, talks, and workshops in cities such as Montreal, Ottawa, Toronto, Calgary, Quebec, Vancouver, and Edmonton.

In addition to Numa Moraes, Büsch has shared stages with important Uruguayan artists such as Pepe Guerra, Mauricio Ubal, Daniel Viglietti, and the duo Larbanois – Carrero, as well as groups from other countries, such as Quilapayún.

== Discography ==
=== For children ===
- Aserrín aserrán, las canciones de la abuela
- tuhermanaeZ
- Rondas infantiles

=== For adults ===
- Tocando el tiempo (Ediciones T.G.B. 2002)
- Por el gusto de cantar (together with Numa Moraes. Montevideo Music Group 3394-2. 2005)
