= Caraguatá River =

River in Tacuarembó Department, Uruguay

Coordinates: 32°15′30″S 55°24′15″W

The Caraguatá River is a river in northern Uruguay.

== Location ==
It is situated in the north of the country, in the Tacuarembó Department and the Rivera Department, where the river rises.

=== Fluvial system ===
It is a tributary of the Tacuarembó River.

The river runs generally from north-west to south-east.

== Name ==
The word 'Caraguatá' originally referred to a local plant.

The name is also shared by a nearby range of hills and two local towns situated in Tacuarembó Department and Rivera Department respectively.

== See also ==
- Cuchilla de Caraguatá#Name
- Geography of Uruguay#Topography and hydrography
- Uruguay#Geography
