= Carlos Malo =

Uruguayan singer

Carlos Malo (born 23 December 1983 in Rocha, Uruguay) is a Uruguayan folk singer.

== Discography ==
- Soy de Rocha (2002)
- Sencillito (2004, with Pepe Guerra, Eduardo Larbanois, Cacho Labandera, and Popo Romano)
- Pa levantar tierrita (2006)
- Trote polkero (2009, with Jorge Nasser)
- Marca registrada (2011, with Miguel Ángel Palomeque and José Carlos Aliano)
- Atípico (2020)
- De pura cepa (2022)
