= Circe Maia =

Uruguayan writer, translator, and teacher

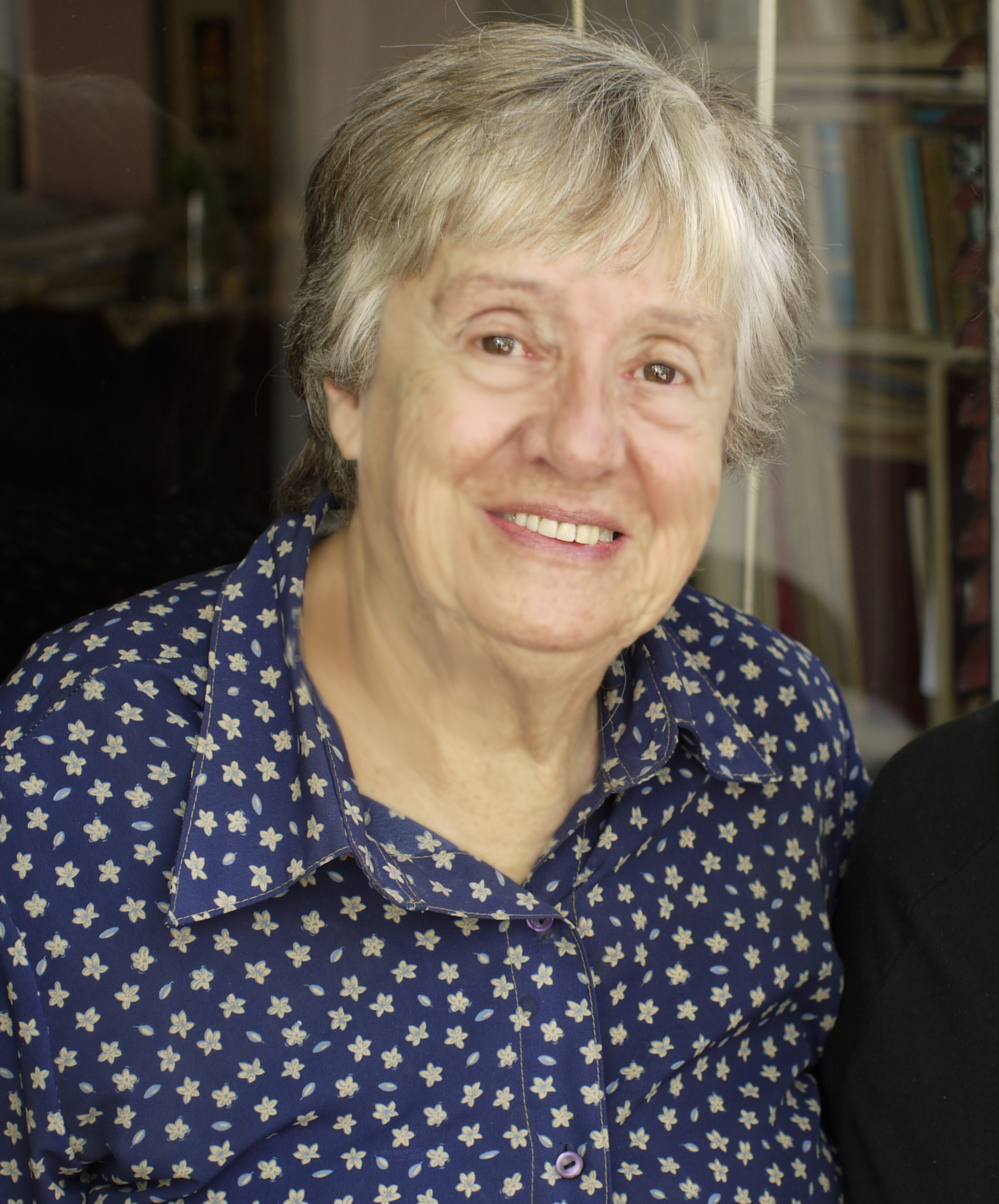
- Born: June 29, 1932; Montevideo, Uruguay
- Education: University of the Republic
- Occupations: Poet, writer, translator, teacher
- Spouse: Ariel Ferreira

Circe Maia (born June 29, 1932, in Montevideo) is a Uruguayan poet, essayist, translator, and teacher.

== Biography ==
Circe Maia was born in Montevideo, Uruguay, in 1932. Her parents were María Magdalena Rodríguez and the notary Julio Maia, both originally from the north of Uruguay. Her father published her first book of poetry (Plumitas, 1944) when she was just 12 years old. The sudden death of her mother when she was 19 left a somber mark on Maia's first book of mature poetry which was published when she was 25 (En el tiempo, 1958).

She married Ariel Ferreira, a medical doctor, in 1957. In 1962 they moved permanently to Tacuarembó in the north of Uruguay with their first two children.

She studied philosophy in the Instituto de Profesores Artigas and also at the Facultad de Humanidades y Ciencias of the Universidad de la República, both in Montevideo. She began teaching philosophy at a Tacuarembó high school and at the Instituto de Formación Docente de Tacuarembó, the local teachers' college. She was a founding member of a students' union (Centro de Estudiantes del Instituto de Profesores Artigas) and an active member of the Socialist Party of Uruguay.

The years of the civil-military dictatorship of Uruguay were difficult for Circe Maia and her family. At 3 a.m. one morning in 1972, police raided their home to arrest both Ariel and Circe. However Circe was allowed to remain because she was caring for their four-day-old daughter. Her husband was imprisoned for two years for being associated with the Tupamaros National Liberation Movement. In 1973 the government dismissed her from her teaching position at the high school. However, she began to teach English and French language classes privately. In 1982 her 18-year-old son was killed in an automobile accident. This tragedy combined with the pressures of the dictatorship caused her to suspend poetry writing. With the return of democracy in 1985, her position at the high school was restored, and in 1987 she published two books, Destrucciones, a small book of bitter prose, and Un viaje a Salto, a narrative about an incident during her husband's imprisonment.

Her return to poetry was marked by the publication of Superficies (1990), which was followed by other poetry books and her translations from English, Greek, and other languages. For the reading public, her most important publication was the recompilation of poetry from her previous nine books appearing as Circe Maia: obra poética (2007 and 2010), amounting to over 400 pages.

Circe Main taught philosophy in high school until her retirement in 2001, but she continued to teach English in a private institute and direct local theater productions, as well as continuing her work as a poet, essayist, and translator.

== Poetry ==
In her first book as an adult, En el tiempo (1958) Circe Maia wrote that she favored a poetic language that was "direct, sober, and open, that was not different in tone from conversation, but was a conversation with greater quality, greater intensity.... The mission of this language is to uncover, not to hide; to uncover the value and meaning of existence, not to usher us into a separate world requiring an exclusive and closed poetic language". Throughout her poetic career Maia has been faithful to this conviction. People, objects, personal tragedies, the art of painting, and the passage of time are some themes she has "uncovered", and by doing so has revealed the human condition. She uses her personal experience to feel the pulse of humanity and to discuss it conversationally, as with a close friend.

For more than fifty years she has avoided letting her poetry become self-contained, the sort of literature that ends up as monologue. As she has said, "in daily lived experience one of the most authentic sources of poetry". Her intelligent poetry is an expression of sensation, especially the heard and the seen.

Her poems have been set to music by Daniel Viglietti, Jorge Lazaroff, Numa Moraes, and Andrés Stagnaro, among others. That her poetry has been part of the spirit of the times can be seen in the Uruguayan nueva canción group of the late 1970s Los que Iban Cantando, whose name was inspired by a poem in her book En el tiempo (1958). Perhaps more significantly, her poem Por detrás de mi voz was set to music by Daniel Viglietti in 1978 as Otra voz canta. This song, sometimes performed in combination with the poem Desaparecidos by Mario Benedetti, became a Latin American anthem against the military regimes that committed forced disappearances, especially those participating in Operation Condor:

Por detrás de mi voz
—escucha, escucha—
otra voz canta.

Viene de atrás, de lejos
viene de sepultadas
bocas y canta.

Dicen que no están muertos
—escúchalos, escucha—
mientras se alza la voz
que los recuerda y canta.

Escucha, escucha:
otra voz canta.

— "Por detrás de mi voz" (excerpt)
Translation:

Behind my voice
—listen, listen—
another voice sings.

It comes from behind, from afar,
It comes from entombed
mouths and sings.

They say they're not dead
—listen to them, listen—
while my voice is lifted
which remembers them and sings.

Listen, listen:
another voice sings.

== Regional background ==
Maia has lived for many years in the northern city of Tacuarembó. Along with fellow writer Jesús Moraes, she is one of the relatively few contemporary Uruguayan writers to be strongly identified with the north of the country.

=== 'Poemas de Caraguatá' ===
Her series of poems 'Poemas de Caraguatá, I, II, III & IV', take their name from the Maia's reflections provoked by an indigenous toponym of Tacuarembó Department in the north of the country, which may variously refer to a range of hills Cuchilla de Caraguatá, a local town named after that range of hills, a local river, the Caraguatá River, or a local plant.

In this series of poems are contained reflections to which local topography, flora and fauna have given rise.

== Prizes ==
- 2007, Premio Nacional de Poesía de Uruguay.
- 2009, Premio Anual de Literatura–Poesía, for the book Obra Completa.
- 2009, Homenaje de la Academia Nacional de Letras.
- 2010, Premio Bartolomé Hidalgo a la trayectoria.
- 2012, Medalla Delmira Agustini.
- 2015, Premio Bartolomé Hidalgo de poesía for the book Dualidades.
- 2015, El Gran Premio a la Labor Intelectual, MEC.
- 2023, Premio Internacional de Poesía Ciudad de Granada Federico García Lorca.

== Bibliography ==
=== Poetry ===
Collections

- 1944, Plumitas.
- 1958, En el tiempo.
- 1958, Presencia diaria.
- 1970, El Puente.
- 1972, Maia, Bacelo, Benavides; poesía.
- 1978, Cambios, permanencias.
- 1981, Dos voces
- 1986, Destrucciones, (prose poems).
- 1987, Un viaje a Salto, (prose).
- 1990, Superficies.
- 1996, Círculo de luz, círculo de sombra, (translation of her poetry into Swedish).
- 1998, De lo visible.
- 1999, Medida por medida, (translation of Shakespeare's Measure for Measure).
- 2001, Breve sol.
- 2001, Yesterday a Eucalyptus, (translation of her poetry into English).
- 2004, A Trip to Salto, (English translation of her 1987 book).
- 2010, Obra poética, (collected poetry).
- 2011, La casa de polvo sumeria: sobre lecturas y traducciones.
- 2013, La pesadora de perlas.
- 2013, Poemas: Robin Fulton, (her translation of the Scottish poet).
- 2014, Dualidades
- 2015, El Puente Invisible/The Invisible Bridge/Selected Poems of Circe Maia (bilingual edition)
- 2018, Transparencias
- 2018, Múltiples paseos a un lugar desconocido
- 2020, Voces del agua

List of poems

Title	Year	First published	Reprinted/collected
Hummingbirds	2013	Maia, Circe (November 25, 2013). "Hummingbirds". The New Yorker. Vol. 89, no. 38. Trans. Jesse Lee Kercheval. p. 84.	

== See also ==
- Cuchilla de Caraguatá#Featured in literature
