= Cruz de los Caminos, Tacuarembó =

Cruz de los Caminos (Cuchilla de) Caraguatá
- Village
- Location in Uruguay
- Coordinates: 32°13′57″S 54°58′16″W
- Country: Uruguay
- Department: Tacuarembó Department

Population (2011)
  - Total: 463
- Time zone: UTC -3
- Postal code: 45019
- Dial plan: +598 463 (+5 digits)

Cruz de los Caminos, formerly named Cuchilla de Caraguatá or Caraguatá is a village in the Tacuarembó Department of Uruguay. It took its original name from a nearby range of hills, known as the Cuchilla de Caraguatá. The word 'Caraguatá' refers to a local plant and is also the name of a nearby stream.

== Geography ==
The village is situated in the east of the department, 6.5 kilometres (4.0 mi) southeast of Las Toscas, on km. 360 of Route 6 and on its intersection with Route 26.

== Population ==
In 2011 Cruz de los Caminos had a population of 463. No former census had given results for this location.

Year	Population
2011	463

== Public schools ==
In Cruz de los Caminos is Public School 61, while 2.7 kilometres (1.7 mi) to its west, on Route 6 is Public School 26, next to the police station. About 4.6 kilometres (2.9 mi) west-southwest of Las Toscas is the rural area Public School 28, named Costas de Caraguatá.
