= Tambores =

- Town
- Location in Uruguay
- Coordinates: 31°53′0″S 56°15′0″W
- Country: Uruguay
- Department: Paysandú Department and Tacuarembó Department

Population (2011)
  - Total: 1,561
- Time zone: UTC -3
- Postal code: 45004
- Dial plan: +598 463 (+5 digits)

Tambores is a small town partly in the Paysandú Department and partly in the Tacuarembó Department of western Uruguay.

== Geography ==
It is located on both sides of the interdepartmental road which forms the border between the two departments, 8 kilometres (5.0 mi) south of its intersection with Route 26, which lies 33 kilometres (21 mi) southwest of Tacuarembó, the capital city of the department. The railroad track Montevideo - Tacuarembó - Rivera passes through the town.

== History ==
On 21 August 1936, the existing populated nucleus here was elevated to "Pueblo" (village) by the Act of Ley N° 9.588. Until then, it had been head of the judicial section of "Salsipuedes". Its status was further elevated to "Villa" (town) on 15 October 1963 by the Act of Ley N° 13.167.

== Population ==
In 2011 Tambores had a population of 1,561, of which 1,111 in Paysandú and 450 in Tacuarembó.

| Year | Population |
|---|---|
| 1908 | 1,886 |
| 1963 | 1,508 |
| 1975 | 1,532 |
| 1985 | 1,410 |
| 1996 | 1,479 |
| 2004 | 1,720 |
| 2011 | 1,561 |

Source: Instituto Nacional de Estadística de Uruguay
