= Mario Carrero =

Uruguayan musician

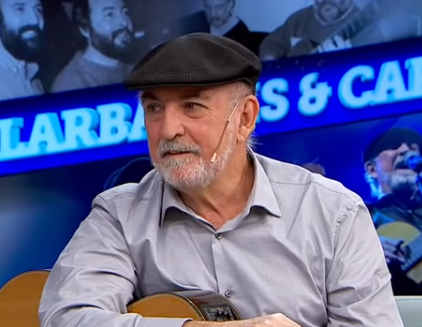
Mario Carrero

Mario Carrero (born 16 May 1952, in Florida) is a Uruguayan musician, best known for his work with Eduardo Larbanois in the duo Larbanois - Carrero.

== Biography ==
From an early age he moved to Montevideo and developed his artistic career as a solo act. It is able to participate in the Festival of Paysandú in 1973, "which won the award for best voice who knows Eduardo Larbanois, which comprised at that time the duo Los Eduardos with Eduardo Lago. After the dissolution of the duo in 1977, decided to create Larbanois with a new duo that would have the name Larbanois - Carrero.

== Discography ==
=== With Larbanois - Carrero ===
- See: Larbanois - Carrero Discography
