= Gustavo Alamón =

Uruguayan artist (1935–2020)

- Born: Gustavo Alamón Da Rosa; 13 January 1935; Tacuarembó, Uruguay
- Died: 23 June 2020 (aged 85); Tacuarembó, Uruguay
- Education: Escuela Nacional de Bellas Artes
- Known for: Painting

Gustavo Alamón Da Rosa (13 January 1935 – 23 June 2020) was a Uruguayan painter, draftsman, educator and cultural administrator. Over a career spanning nearly six decades, he became known for a series of paintings depicting robots and androids, which became the defining motif of his work. Alongside his artistic practice, he taught drawing and painting throughout Uruguay, directed several public cultural institutions, and served in leadership positions at the Ministry of Education and Culture.

== Early life and education ==
Alamón was born in Tacuarembó on 13 January 1935. He began his artistic training with the painter Anhelo Hernández before entering the Escuela Nacional de Bellas Artes in Montevideo in 1959, where he studied under Edgardo Ribeiro and Miguel Ángel Pareja. He later received a scholarship to attend the First Printmaking Seminar at the Museo Nacional de Artes Visuales.

Before establishing himself as an artist, Alamón held several occupations. He attended the Military High School, worked as a firefighter, and later became a secondary-school drawing teacher. During the civic-military dictatorship, he was dismissed from his teaching position in 1975.

== Career ==
Alamón began exhibiting his work in 1962 and over the following decades participated in more than 150 solo and group exhibitions in Uruguay and abroad. His work was included in the National Salons of Visual Arts, the International Biennial of Valparaíso in 1981 and 1983, and the São Paulo Biennial in 1983. He also exhibited in Switzerland, France, Italy, Finland, Venezuela and Spain, where he lived between 1991 and 1994.

Although he worked in landscape, portraiture and still life early in his career, Alamón gradually developed a highly personal body of figurative painting centred on robots and androids. He also experimented with collage and printmaking, although oil painting remained his principal medium throughout his career.

In addition to his work as an artist, Alamón devoted much of his professional life to teaching. He taught drawing in secondary schools and established a number of art workshops, including El Sótano in Tacuarembó. He also founded or directed workshops in Fray Bentos, Paysandú and Salto, contributing to the training of several generations of Uruguayan artists.

His career also included public service in the cultural sector. He served as Director of Culture of the Department of Río Negro, later directed the Department of Visual Arts of Uruguay's Ministry of Education and Culture in 1999, and headed the Ministry's National Training Workshop for Visual Arts Teachers from 2000 to 2004. He also directed the Museo y Galería Puerta de San Juan in Montevideo.

== Artistic style ==
Alamón is best known for paintings depicting robots and androids, a theme he developed from the late 1970s onward. According to art critics, these figures were not intended as representations of technology itself but as metaphors for the loss of humanity, alienation and the mechanisation of modern life. Rather than referring exclusively to military rule, the imagery addressed broader questions about power, conformity and the erosion of individual identity.

In 1980 Alamón began the series known as ''Los Notables'', portraying mechanical figures associated with authority and power. The following year he developed the series ''Los Humanoides'', in which the metallic figures became larger, more austere and visually imposing. These works established the imagery for which he became best known and remain the most widely discussed part of his artistic production.

Despite the prominence of the robot series, Alamón continued to work across a range of subjects throughout his career. Academic studies have noted that he combined artistic production with sustained activity as a teacher and cultural promoter, remaining active until the final years of his life.

== Awards and recognition ==
Alamón received numerous awards during his career, including the Acquisition Prize at the 44th National Salon of Visual Arts (1980), First Prize for Painting at the First Salon of the Embassy of Spain (1980), and the National Grand Prize for Painting at the 47th National Salon of Visual Arts (1983).

In 1985 he was appointed a Chevalier of the Order of Arts and Letters by the French Ministry of Culture. He later received the Morosoli Award for Painting in 1999 and the Gardel Award for Visual Arts in 2007. In 2014 he was named an Illustrious Citizen of Tacuarembó, receiving the distinction the following year.

== Collections ==
Alamón's works are held in public and private collections in Uruguay and abroad. Public collections include the Museo Nacional de Artes Visuales, the Museo de Arte Americano in Maldonado, departmental museums in Rivera, Rocha, San José and Treinta y Tres, the Museo de Arte Moderno in Santiago de Chile, the Museo de Arte Moderno in Asunción, the National Library of Spain, the Ralli Museums, and the Chase Manhattan Bank Collection in New York. His works are also represented in private collections in Europe, North and South America, and New Zealand.

Alamón died in Tacuarembó on 23 June 2020 at the age of 85.
