= Cerro Batoví =

Hill in Uruguay

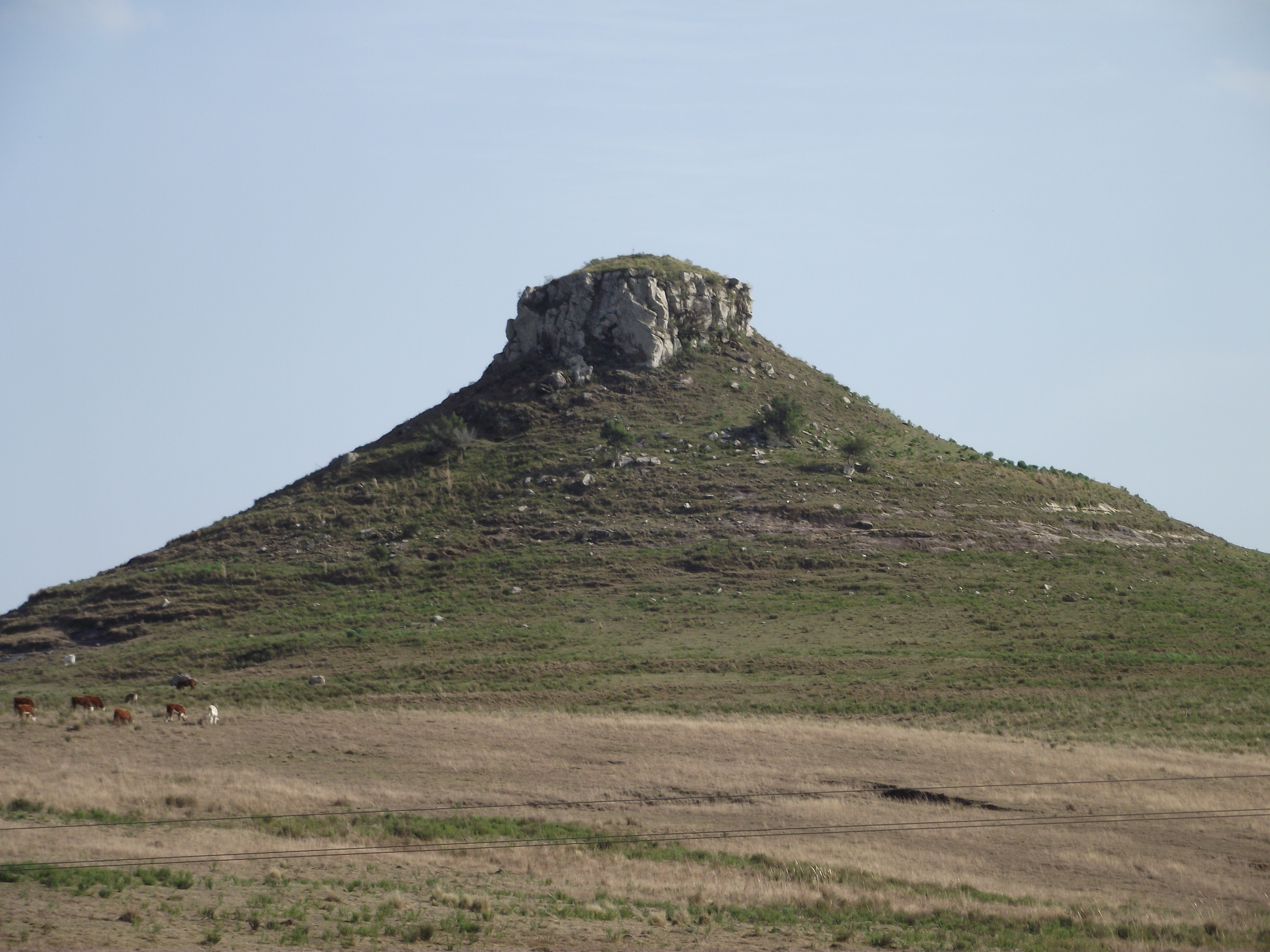
- Cerro Batoví, situated near Tacuarembó

Highest point
- Elevation: 224 m (735 ft)
- Listing: Breast-shaped hills
- Coordinates: 31°52′33″S 56°00′41″W

Naming
- English translation: Cerro (Hill in Spanish); Batoví (Breast of a virgin in Guaraní)
- Language of name: Spanish/Guaraní
- Pronunciation: Spanish: [ˈθero βatoˈβi]

Geography
- Location within Uruguay
- Location: Tacuarembó, Tacuarembó Department, Uruguay
- Parent range: Cuchilla de Haedo

Geology
- Rock age: Precambrian
- Mountain type: Hill

Climbing
- Easiest route: Hike

Cerro Batoví is a hill in Uruguay, with an altitude of 224 metres (734.9 ft). It is situated 25 km (15.5 mi) away from the city of Tacuarembó.

== Location and features ==
It is located in the Tacuarembó Department, in a range of hills named Cuchilla de Haedo. Batoví means "breast of a virgin" in the Guaraní language and the hill has this name due to its curious shape.

Cerro Batoví is considered the symbol of the Tacuarembó Department.

== See also ==
- Breast-shaped hill
- Cerro Catedral
- Cerro de las Ánimas
- Cerro Pan de Azúcar
- Geography of Uruguay
