= Jesús Moraes =

Jesús Moraes (born 1955 in Bella Unión, Artigas Department) is an Uruguayan writer, who specializes in short stories.

== Subject and nature of writings ==
As a Spanish-language 'cuentista', Moraes's writings regularly feature fantasy, religion, and the geographical north of Uruguay, from where he hails. Some of the religious thematic element in Moraes's work relates to his seminary background, although his theological studies did not eventually lead to a clerical vocation.

=== Works ===
El descubrimiento (The Discovery) is one of his better-known compilations.

His short story "Los demonios de Pilar Ramírez" (The demons of Pilar Ramírez) has been made into a film.

== Regional background ==
While Uruguayan culture, especially its 20th- and 21st century literature, is substantially secular, and based in the capital, Montevideo, Moraes's work in contrast is centred upon the north of the country, and its religious overtones tend to be more overt than in the works of many other contemporary Uruguayan writers.

Along with fellow writer Circe Maia, he is one of the relatively few contemporary Uruguayan writers to be strongly identified with the north of the country.

=== Moraes's works in translation ===
Some of Moraes's work has been translated into Portuguese. Significantly for Moraes's work, the Uruguayan north shares geographical and cultural similarities with the neighbouring state of Rio Grande do Sul, in Portuguese-speaking Brazil; and Bella Unión, the writer's hometown, is situated near to the Cuareim River, marking the border between Uruguay and Brazil.

== See also ==
- Bella Unión#Notable local person
- List of Uruguayan writers
- Circe Maia#Regional background
- List of contemporary writers from northern Uruguay
