= Achar, Uruguay =

Achar
- Village
- Location in Uruguay
- Coordinates: 32°24′0″S 56°11′0″W
- Country: Uruguay
- Department: Tacuarembó Department

Population (2011)
  - Total: 687
- Time zone: UTC -3
- Dial plan: +598 46 (+6 digits)

Achar is a village in the Tacuarembó Department of northern-central Uruguay.

== Geography ==
The village is located on Route 43, 10 kilometres (6.2 mi) east of Route 5, on the intersection with the railroad track.

== History ==
On 21 August 1936, the status of the populated centre here was elevated to "Pueblo" (village) by the Act of Ley Nº 9.587.

== Population ==
In 2011 Achar had a population of 687.

Year	Population
1908	2,708
1963	770
1975	608
1985	561
1996	637
2004	780
2011	687

Source: Instituto Nacional de Estadística de Uruguay

== Places of worship ==
- St. Joseph Parish Church (Roman Catholic)

== Mars ==
The name Achar has been used for a crater on the planet Mars by the International Astronomical Union, although not specifically commemorating the village.
