= Larbanois – Carrero =

Uruguayan folk duo

Larbanois & Carrero
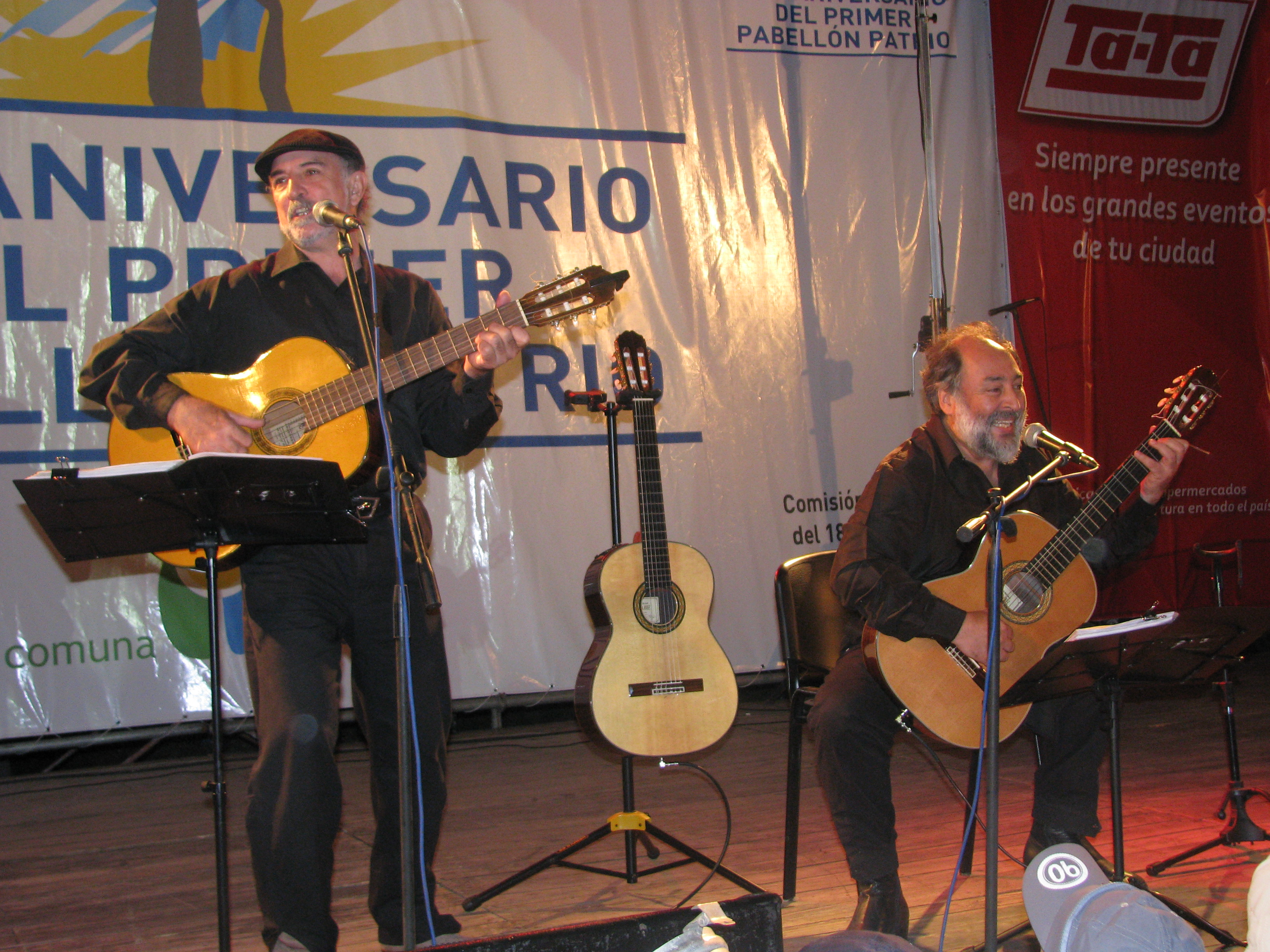
- Larbanois & Carrero in 2008

Background information
- Origin: Uruguay
- Genres: Popular music, Folk music
- Years active: 1977 - Actuality
- Labels: Sondor; Orfeo / EMI; Ayuí / Tacuabé; Montevideo Music Group
- Members: Eduardo Larbanois; Mario Carrero
- Website: Official website

Larbanois – Carrero is a Uruguayan folk music duo consisting of Eduardo Larbanois and Mario Carrero. Created at the end of 1977 and with a history that stretches to the present, is concerning artistic several generations of Uruguayan musicians .

== History ==
Mario Carrero was born in Florida on May 16, 1952. From an early age he settled in Montevideo and developed his acting career as a soloist. It was at the Festival of Paysandú, where he earned the award for best voice, that he first met Eduardo Larbanois, who was performing as part of the duet The Eduardos.

Eduardo Larbanois was born in Tacuarembó on August 11, 1953. He was a pupil of Abel Carlevaro and Esteban Klisich, among others. He joined the duo Los Eduardos with Eduardo Lago, with whom he recorded 3 LPs and achieved some recognition at regional level, touring Uruguay and part of Argentina. He also performed on the collective album "Troves por Leandro Gómez" with Carlos Maria Fossati, Carlos Benavides and Julio Mora, released in 1978.

In 1977, Larbanois and Carrero decided to form a duo, performing for the first time in a recital organized by university students in the Colegio San Juan Bautista in 1978.

== Trajectory ==
Over 30 years of performances, the duo has toured around the world, having given recitals in Australia, New Zealand, United States, Canada, Cuba, Paraguay Brazil, Argentina, among others.

He edited some 30 Lps. And shared the stage with a number of Uruguayans and foreign artists, which include: Santiago Feliú, Leon Gieco, Paco Ibanez, César Isella, Joan Manuel Serrat, Daniel Viglietti, Alfredo Zitarrosa, The brothers Carlos and Enrique Mejia Godoy and Pablo Milanés.

== Discography ==
=== In Uruguay ===
- Amigos (Friends) (together Carlos Benavides, Washington Benavides and Juan José de Mello, (1978)
- Larbanois - Carrero (1979)
- Cuando me pongo a cantar (When I get to sing) (1980)
- En recital (with Vera Sienra), (1982)
- Anti rutina (No routine) (1983)
- Tanta vida en cuatro versos (So much life in four verses) (1983)
- Pero andando vamos (But we go walk) (1984)
- El hombre, digo (The man, I say) (1986)
- Rambla sur (South street) (1988)
- Lo mejor de Larbanois - Carrero (The best of Larbanois – Carrero) (1988)
- De madrugadas (1990)
- Antología (1993)
- Antología 2 (1993)
- Identidades (Identities) (1996)
- Cometas sobre los muros (Kites on the walls) (1998)
- Canciones de Santamarta (Santamarta song's) (2001)
- 25 años (25 years) (2002)
- Coplas del fogon (Fire's songs) (2005)

=== In Argentina ===
- Larbanois-Carrero (1980)
- Cuando me pongo a cantar (When I get to sing) (1981)
- Anti rutina (No routine) (1984)
- Pero andando vamos (But we go walk) (1984)
- Canciones de Santamarta (Santamarta song's) (Acqua Records), 2006)

=== In Brazil ===
- The Comparsa (La Comparsa) (1980)
- Raíces clavadas bien hondo (Roots nailed well deep) (1982)
- El dorado (con Belchior) (The golden (with Belchior)) (1990)
- Mercosul de canciones (Mercosul Song) (1996)

=== In Canada and the United States ===
- De Norte a Sur (From north to south) (1995)
