= Gerardo de Oscar =

Uruguayan writer, essayist and theologian

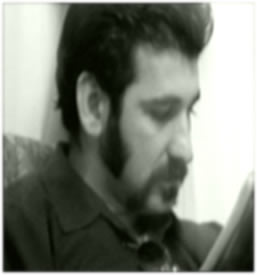
Gerardo De Oscar

Gerardo De Oscar y Araujo (born 5 February 1978) is an Uruguayan writer, essayist and theologian. Self-taught in humanist disciplines, he has written both stories and essays. His works are rich in narrative and dimensional parallel imaginary landscapes, as well as an interesting range of characters devoid of morals including true antiheroes, intense and willing to live dangerously. In creation, De Oscar formed a non-existent universe, abstract and relative. His essays address such diverse topics as love, the nature of the human race, politics, history, anthropology and theology.

== Works ==
- Snake Head and Other Tales (2009)
- Essay on racial anthropology (2004)
- Alif, Lam, Mim (2007)
- The eloquent gesture (2005)
