= Héctor Numa Moraes =

Uruguayan musician

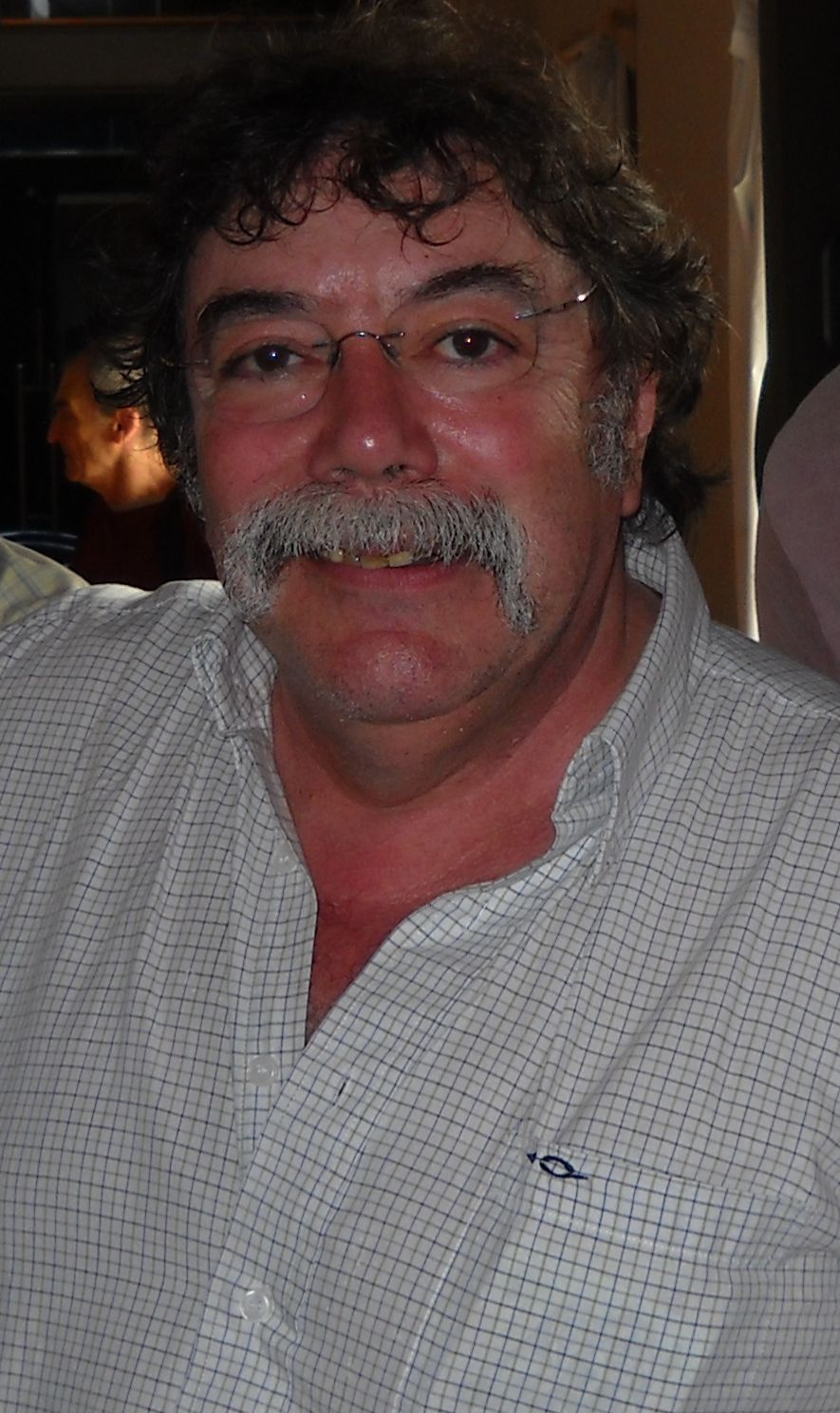
Numa Moraes

Héctor Numa Moraes Rosa (born 28 April 1950 in Curtina, Tacuarembó Department) is a Uruguayan singer-songwriter and guitarist.

Exiled in the Netherlands during the civic-military dictatorship, he took part in the album Hart voor Chili (various artists).

In 2004 and 2005, Numa Moraes performed a series of shows with Erika Büsch entitled "Por el gusto de cantar" (for the love of singing), during which they performed at the Zitarrosa Hall in Montevideo and made a tour of the interior of Peru. The repertoire of the shows, in addition to including themes of both artists, incorporated works by different Latin American authors such as Silvio Rodríguez, Violeta Parra, Atahualpa Yupanqui, and Carlos Puebla.
