= Florencio Sánchez =

Uruguayan playwright, journalist and political figure (1875–1910)

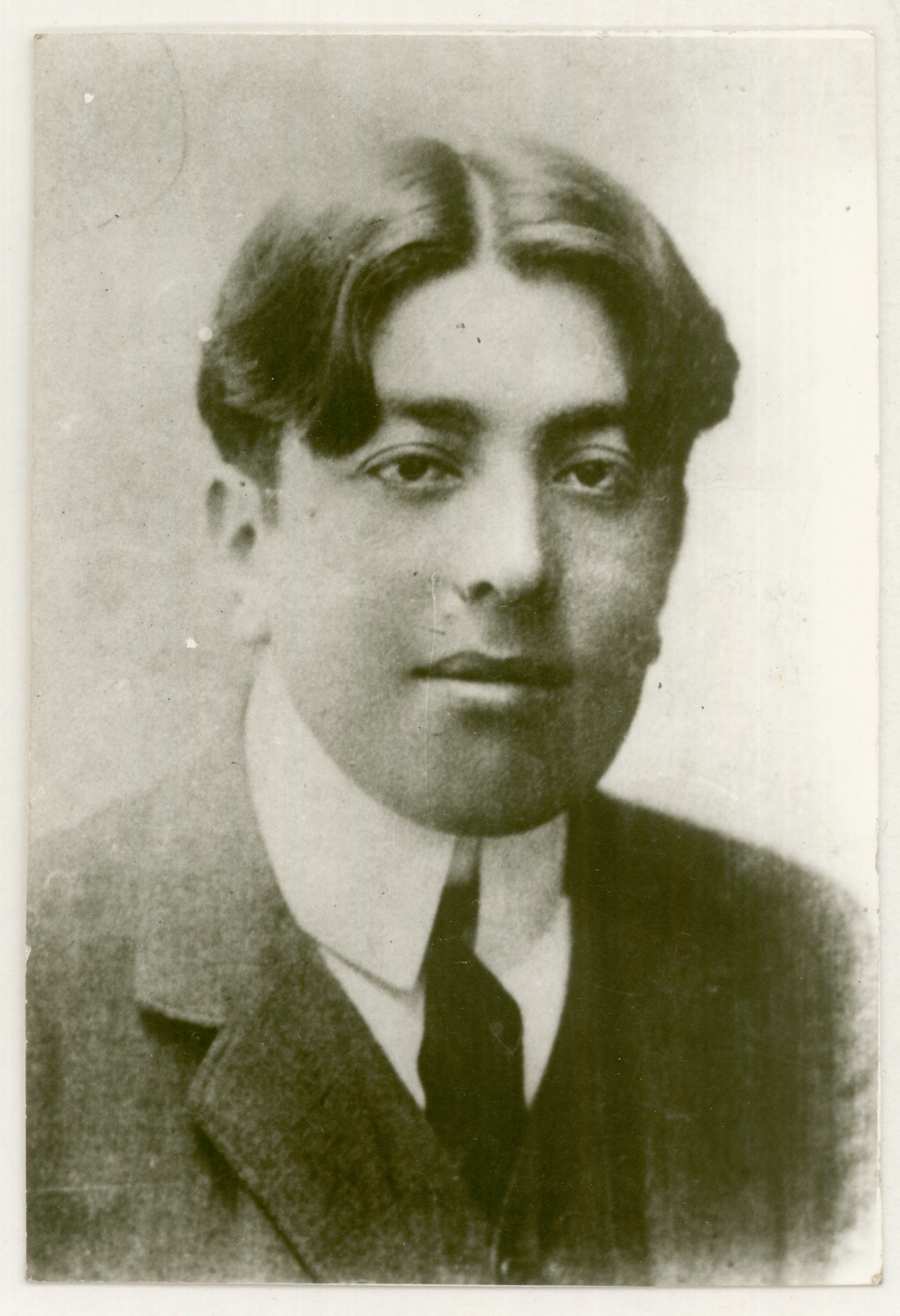
- Photograph from the Collection Aníbal Barrios Pintos, National Library of Uruguay.
- Born: Florencio Sánchez; January 17, 1875; Montevideo, Uruguay
- Died: November 7, 1910 (aged 35); Milan, Italy
- Occupation(s): writer, journalist, politic
- Spouse: Catalina Raventos

Florencio Sánchez (January 17, 1875 – November 7, 1910) was a Uruguayan playwright, journalist and political figure. He is considered one of the founding fathers of theater in the River Plate region of Argentina and Uruguay.

== Biography ==
Florencio Sánchez's parents moved him and his eleven siblings to the city of Treinta y Tres and later to Minas, where he attended elementary school. At a very young age, he published a few satirical articles in a newspaper and participated as actor and author in some family musicals (with staged representations).

After abandoning high school, Sánchez alternated his life between Montevideo, Buenos Aires and Rosario. His intense works in journalism and theater unfolded in these cities. In Montevideo he joined the International Center for Social Studies (a literary organization). In Rosario he was a secretary for the writing department of La República ("The Republic"), a publication led by Lisandro de la Torre. His first writings of a social and political nature were published in La República. The critical and scathing realism was apparent in his literary work for the newspaper; this writing style would later characterize his theatrical productions.

Sánchez moved to Buenos Aires, Argentina, in 1892, after spending some time in Rosario, a city in Santa Fe, Argentina. He remained there for two years. After his return to Montevideo in 1894, he began working as a journalist for the newspapers El Nacional ("The National"), La Razón ("The Reason"), and El Siglo ("The Century"). He published interviews and wrote political articles in which he incorporated dialogues among the protagonists. In Buenos Aires, he began to make a name for himself as a journalist. He started to participate in intellectual circles and the Buenos Aires night life.

In 1897, when the civil war broke out in Uruguay, he returned to his home country and fought under Aparicio Saravia, thus continuing his family's history of political action. During this phase, he came into contact with intellectuals such as Eduardo Acevedo Díaz. Shortly after his wartime service, his political affiliation with anarchy began. He wrote in La Protesta ("The Protest") and in the magazine El Sol ("The Sun"), the latter being led by Alberto Ghiraldo. Sánchez's plays Ladrones ("Thieves") and Puertas adentro ("Doors Within") were written in the anarchist model.

On August 13, 1903, his first play, M'hijo el dotor ("My son, the doctor"), was performed in the Comedy Theater of Buenos Aires. It was a success, and he followed up with a short but intense period of playwriting, with similar success in both Buenos Aires and Montevideo. These new plays included a farce entitled La gente honesta ("The Honest People") and perhaps his most famous play, Canillita ("The Newspaper Vendor"), both also written in 1903. Canillita has been interpreted by a Spanish operetta company.

With the success of M'hijo el dotor, Sánchez married Catalina Raventos on September 25, 1903, after being in a relationship with her since 1897. His unorganized economic life caused him to sell his plays to several impresarios and theater actors for very little, when he needed money. He frequently accepted advances for plays which he had not yet finished or begun writing, and he sometimes wrote plays hurriedly, giving them away without final revisions.

In 1906, Sánchez settled in La Plata, where he worked for the Office of Anthropometric Identification, which was funded by Juan Vucetich. He contracted tuberculosis, which was spreading rapidly during the late 1880s and early 1900s.

For many years, he had intended to travel to Europe to create a socially and economically successful play. In 1909, he found an opportunity to go and boarded the Italian ship Principe di Udine on September 25, arriving in Genova on October 13. In Italy, he dedicated himself finding a way to connect with the theater companies, for an opportunity to see his plays produced in Spain and France. Upon receiving 3000 francs in 1910 for his play Los muertos ("The Dead"), he spent all of his money in just a few days in Niza on women and gambling in casinos.

After traveling through much of Italy and southern France, he went to Milan, an important center for theater, to contact with some theater impresarios. However, his disease was affecting his health and he was ordered to travel to Switzerland because it was believed that the pure Alpine air would help him. After arriving in Switzerland by train, he was refused service by hotels and hospitals because of his contagious disease. He returned to Milan and was admitted to a hospital in Milan on November 2 and died on November 7. He was thirty-five years old.

A passionate observer, Sánchez's favorite themes for his plays were family, the tenement, and immigrants. He also portrayed the social classes on both sides of the Silver River (Río de la Plata), displaying through the everyday life of and dialogue between his characters both the misery and hope of the working class.

== Works ==
Sánchez is regarded as Uruguay's leading playwright. His dramatic plays include:

- La gente honesta [English: The Honest People] Farce; premiere- June 26, 1903. Retitled Los curdas.
- M'hijo el dotor [English: My Son, the Doctor] Comedy in three acts; premiere- August 13, 1903
- Canillita [English: The Newspaper Vendor] Farce; premiere- October 2, 1903
- Cédulas de San Juan [English: The Raffle of the Night of St. John] Farce in two acts; premiere- August 7, 1904
- La pobre gente [English: The Poor People] Comedy in two acts; premiere- October 1904
- La gringa [English: The Gringa] Comedy in four acts; premiere- November 21, 1904
- Barranca abajo [English: Downwards Gully] Tragedy in three acts; premiere- April 26, 1905
- Mano santa [English: Holy Hand] Farce; premiere- June 9, 1905
- En familia [English: In the Family] Comedy in three acts; premiere- October 6, 1905
- Los muertos [English: The Dead] Comedy in three acts; premiere- October 23, 1905
- El conventillo [English: The Tenement] Traditional Spanish Operetta in one act; premiere- June 22, 1906
- El desalojo [English: The Eviction] Farce; premiere- July 16, 1906
- El pasado [English: The Past] Comedy in three acts; premiere- October 22, 1906
- Los curdas [English: The Drunkards] Farce; premiere- January 2, 1907
- La tigra [English: The Tigress] Farce; premiere- January 2, 1907
- Moneda falsa [English: The Counterfeit] Farce; January 8, 1907
- El cacique Pichuelo [English: Chief Pichuelo] Traditional Spanish Operetta; premiere- January 9, 1907
- Los derechos de la salud [English: Health Rights] Comedy in three acts; premiere- December 4, 1907
- Nuestros hijos [English: Our Children] Comedy in three acts; premiere- June 1908
- Marta Gruni Farce; premiere- July 1908. Utilized as a text for an opera written by Juarés Lamarque Pons in 1967
- Un buen negocio Comedy in two acts; premiere- May 2, 1909

== Political activities ==
Sánchez was a supporter of the conservative nationalist leader Aparicio Saravia. He sided with Saravia in the Uruguayan Civil War of 1897, but disillusioned by its aftermath, Sánchez became an anarchist and wrote for the anarchist periodical La Protesta (English: Protest).

== See also ==
- List of Uruguayan writers
- Anarchism in the Americas
