= Álvaro Ojeda =

Uruguayan writer

- Born: 1 April 1958 (age 68)
- Occupations: Writer, journalist, novelist, poet, reviewer

Álvaro Ojeda (born 1 April 1958) is a Uruguayan writer, journalist, novelist, poet, and reviewer.

== Works ==
=== Poetry ===
- Ofrecidos al mago sueño (1988) (Ediciones Banda Oriental)
- En un brillo de olvido (1988) (Ediciones Banda Oriental)
- Alzheimer (1992) (Ediciones de Uno)
- Los universos inútiles de Austen Henry Layard (1996) (Ediciones de Último Reino, Buenos Aires, Argentina)
- Substancias de Calcedonia (2002) (Revista Artefacto literario)
- Luz de cualquiera de los doce meses (2003) (Civiles Iletrados)
- Toda sombra me es grata (2006) (Delfos Poesía)

=== Novels ===
- El hijo de la pluma (2004) (Planeta)
- La fascinación (2008) (Planeta)
- Máximo (2010)
