= Jorge Meretta =

Jorge Meretta (14 January 1940 – 7 July 2012) was an Uruguayan poet, musician, photographer and doctor. He was born in Montevideo and trained as a dental surgeon. However, he is better known for his creative work, notably his poetry for which he has won several awards. His work has been translated and anthologized in Contemporary Uruguayan Poetry: A Bilingual Anthology, edited by Ronald Haladyna.
