= Malí Guzmán =

Uruguayan write (born 1961)

- Born: Amalia Guzmán; 27 July 1961 (age 64); Montevideo, Uruguay
- Occupations: Playwright, journalist, scenographer, writer

Amalia "Malí" Guzmán (born 27 June 1961) is a Uruguayan playwright, journalist, and writer of children's literature.

== Biography ==
Born in Montevideo, Uruguay, Malí Guzmán trained there as an actress at the El Galpón Theater school and as a theatrical and television set designer at the Margarita Xirgu Multidisciplinary School of Dramatic Art (EMAD). She was a disciple of the plastic artist Enrique Badaró from 1990 to 1994.

She is the author of several plays aimed at children. In 2001 her work Cuentos de brujas disparatadas was nominated for the Florencio Award in the best children's show category. This work adapts freely and integrates stories of Valerie Thomas (La bruja Berta), Arcadio Lobato (El mayor tesoro) and Mercè Company (Nana Bunilda come pesadillas). She also adapted the novel Aventuras y desventuras de Casiperro del Hambre by Graciela Montes, with the title of Casiperro, and is co-author of the theatrical work for adults Buenas noches, Afrodita, together with Arturo Fleitas and Serrana Ibarra.

As a journalist, she develops children's literature in various media: in El País Cultural (El País supplement); in the magazines Quehacer educativo, ¿Te cuento?, Padres, Madres & Hijos, Revista Latinoamericana de Literatura Infantil (Colombia, of whose editorial board she is a member), Educación y Biblioteca (Spain); in CX 22 with a weekly segment on children's literature (1996), and on the children's programing of TV Ciudad (1999). From 1995 to 2000, she edited the children's literature section in the magazine El Estante. In 2006, she produced the program La Banda for Televisión Nacional, a children's news show led by children from 6 to 11 years old, for which she won a Tabaré Award in the category of best television program for children. The following year she was a programming advisor for children and adolescents on the same channel.

Guzmán chaired the advisory council of the International Board on Books for Young People (IBBY). Since 2008, she has been advising the Ministry of Education and Culture (MEC) on the National Reading Plan, and since 2010 has coordinated the National System of Public Libraries.

In 1992, her ¿Cómo se llama este libro? took the first prize in the children's literature competition organized by Amauta and the MEC. In 1996 the National Audiovisual Institute awarded her the fiction television category prize (for adults) for Molinos de viento, in co-authorship with Raquel Costa. In 2001, Un lugar para mí (cuentos de amor, oído y garganta) won the Second National Literature Prize in the children's books category.

In 2003, Guzmán won second prize in the books category for Adivinanzas en la escuela (y otros chimentos escolares), written in collaboration with the illustrator Sergio López Suárez. She was a finalist for the Latin American prize for children's literature, organized by the Norma publishing house and the Fundalectura de Colombia foundation, with El robo. This work was published under the title El robo de mi cumpleaños. In 2008, with the works Agustín caminador and Cosas raras, she won the first and second prizes respectively in the Unpublished Children's Literature category of the MEC's Annual Literature Award. In 2010 she won in the Published Children's Literature category for Cayó la noche, and in 2012 she won again in the Unpublished category for Caleidoscopio (rimas y canciones). In 2015 she won the second prize in the Published category for her book Agustín Caminador at the MEC's Annual Literature Awards.

She is co-author of the "Caza-curiosos" children's collection of the Alfaguara publishing house. She has coordinated workshops on children's literature, reading projects, and other literary activities with children, adolescents, teachers, and parents. She has been a member of juries in several competitions, including several films for children, sponsored by Cinemateca Uruguaya.

== Works ==
- Un lugar para mí (Cuentos de amor, oído y garganta) (Alfaguara, 2001)
- ¿Cómo se llama este libro? (Alfaguara, 2002)
- Te odio, Clap (Alfaguara, 2003)
- Adivinanzas en la escuela (y algunos chimentos escolares) (Alfaguara, 2003) with the illustrator Sergio López Suárez
- Adivinanzas de terror (y otros chimentos horrorosos) (Alfaguara, 2003) with the illustrator Sergio López Suárez
- El robo de mi cumpleaños (Trilce, 2005)
- Cayó la noche (Ediciones SM, Argentina, 2008)
- El oído del Diablo (Trilce)
- Auxilio ¡madres! (Fin de Siglo, 2013)
- Agustín Caminador (Banda Oriental, 2014)
- Collection Renata tiene cosas (Banda Oriental, 2015)

=== Theater ===
- Cuentos de brujas disparatadas (2001)
- Casiperro (2002)
- Buenas noches, Afrodita
