= Tomás de Mattos =

Uruguayan writer (1947–2016)

- Born: Tomás de Mattos Hernández; October 14, 1947; Montevideo, Uruguay
- Died: March 21, 2016 (aged 68); Montevideo, Uruguay
- Occupations: Lawyer, writer, librarian
- Awards: Premio Bartolomé Hidalgo; Fraternity Award

Tomás de Mattos Hernández (October 14, 1947 – March 21, 2016) was a Uruguayan writer and librarian. Being from Tacuarembó, de Mattos was one of the relatively few contemporary Uruguayan writers from the north of the country.

As a librarian, de Mattos also served as the director of the National Library of Uruguay.

He won the Premio Bartolomé Hidalgo and the Fraternity Award in 1990.

== Works ==
Among some of the most known works of Tomás de Mattos are the following:

- La puerta de la misericordia (2002)
- Ni Dios permita; Cielo de Bagdad (2001)
- A la sombra del paraíso (1998)
- A palabra limpia : premios y menciones, primer Concurso de Cuentos para Jovenes (1997)
- Historia estampada (1997)
- La fragata de las máscaras (1996)
- Bernabé, Bernabé! (1988)
- La gran sequía (1984)
- Trampas de barro (1983)
- Libros y perros (1975)

== See also ==
- List of Uruguayan writers
- List of contemporary writers from northern Uruguay
