= Eduardo Milán =

Uruguayan author (born 1952)

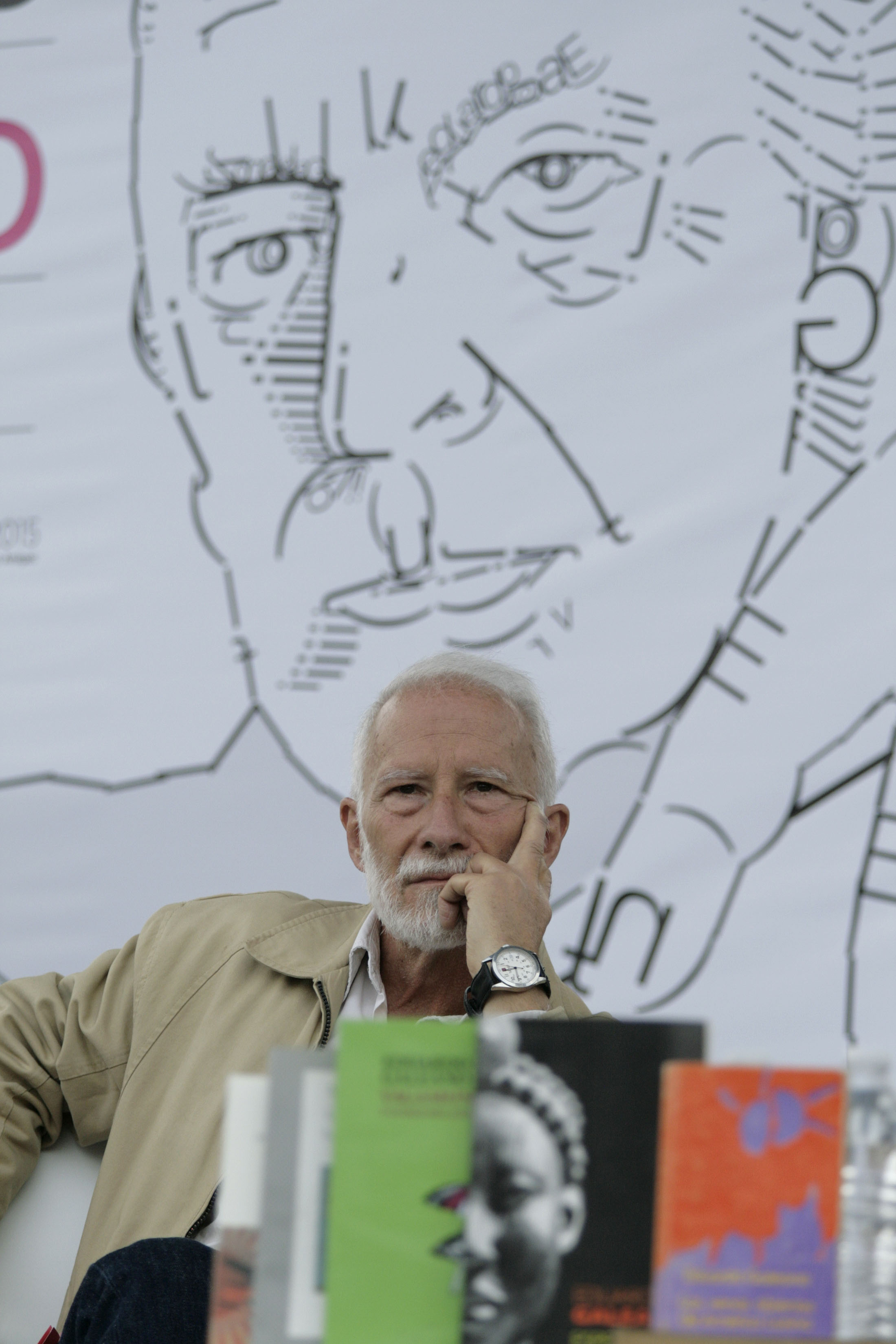
Eduardo Milán

Eduardo Milán is a Uruguayan author who has written over twenty books of poetry, several collections of criticism, and two anthologies of Spanish-language poetry. He was born in Rivera, Uruguay, in 1952. His mother died when he was a year old, and when he was a teenager his father was sent to prison for being affiliated with the Tupamaro guerrilla movement.

== Works ==
=== Books of Poetry ===
- Manto (1996)
- Alegrial (1997) (Aguascalientes National Poetry Award )
- Razón de amor y acto de fe (2001)
- Querencia, gracia y otros poemas (2003)

== Collections of Essays ==
- Una cierta mirada (1998)
- Trata de no ser constructor de ruinas (2003)

== Translations to other languages ==
- Estação da Fábula: poemas de Eduardo Milán. Edição bilingüe. Tradução de Claudio Daniel. São Paulo: Fundação Memorial da América Latina, 2002. 77 pp. ISBN 85-85373-35-0
- Selected poems. Bilingual edition. Edited by Antonio Ochoa. Translated from Spanish by John Oliver Simon, Patrick Madden & Steven Stewart. Bristol: Shearsman Books, 2012. 150 pp. ISBN 978-1-84861-200-6
- Selected Essays. Edited by Antonio Ochoa. Shearsman Books, 2016.
