= Washington Benavides =

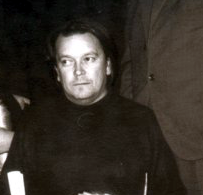
- Born: Washington Benavídez Aliano; 3 March 1930; Tacuarembó, Uruguay
- Died: 24 September 2017 (aged 87); Montevideo, Uruguay
- Education: Universidad de la República
- Occupations: writher, musician, professor
- Awards: Premio Bartolomé Hidalgo; Premio Morosolli

Washington Benavides (3 March 1930 – 24 September 2017) was a Uruguayan poet, professor and musician.

== Writing career ==
Benavides was born in Tacuarembó, Uruguay. During the 1950s, Benavides contributed to the magazine Asir. In 1955, he published his first book Tata Vizcach, a satire of various personalities in his native city. After that he devoted himself heavily to poetry, eventually earning himself a place among the most important Uruguayan poets of his generation. During the dictatorship of Juan María Bordaberry, he promoted the revolutionary possibilities of popular music.

Benavides taught literature at secondary schools in Paso de los Toros and Montevideo, including at Liceo Héctor Miranda, where he remained until 1996. He also joined the Faculty of Humanities and Educational Sciences in the Department of Modern and Contemporary Letters of the University of the Republic, Uruguay. He also worked in radio broadcasting. His poems have been set to music by Daniel Viglietti, Alfredo Zitarrosa, Héctor Numa Moraes, and Eduardo Darnauchans, such as in the songs "El instrumento", Bismark Vega "Dialogo de musicos", "Como un jazmín del país", "Milonga del Cordobés", "Yo no soy de por aquí", and "Tanta vida en cuatro versos".

Washington died in Montevideo, Uruguay on 24 September 2017 at the age of 87.

== Works ==
- Tata Vizcacha (1955)
- El Poeta (1959)
- A un hermano (1962)
- Poesía (1963)
- Las milongas (1966)
- Poemas de la ciega (1968)
- Los sueños de la razón (1968)
- Historias (1971)
- Hokusai (1975)
- Fontefrida (1979)
- Murciélago (1981)
- Finisterre (1985)
- Fotos (1986)
- Tía Cloniche (1990)
- Lección de exorcista (1991)
- El molino del agua (1993) -Premio Nacional y Municipal-
- La luna negra y el profesor (1994)
- Los restos del mamut (1995)
- Canciones de doña Veus (1998)
- El mirlo y la misa (2000)
- Los pies clavados (2000)
- Biografía de Caín (2001)
- Un viejo trovador (2004)
- Diarios del Iporá (2006)
