= Santiago Feliú =

Cuban singer and songwriter

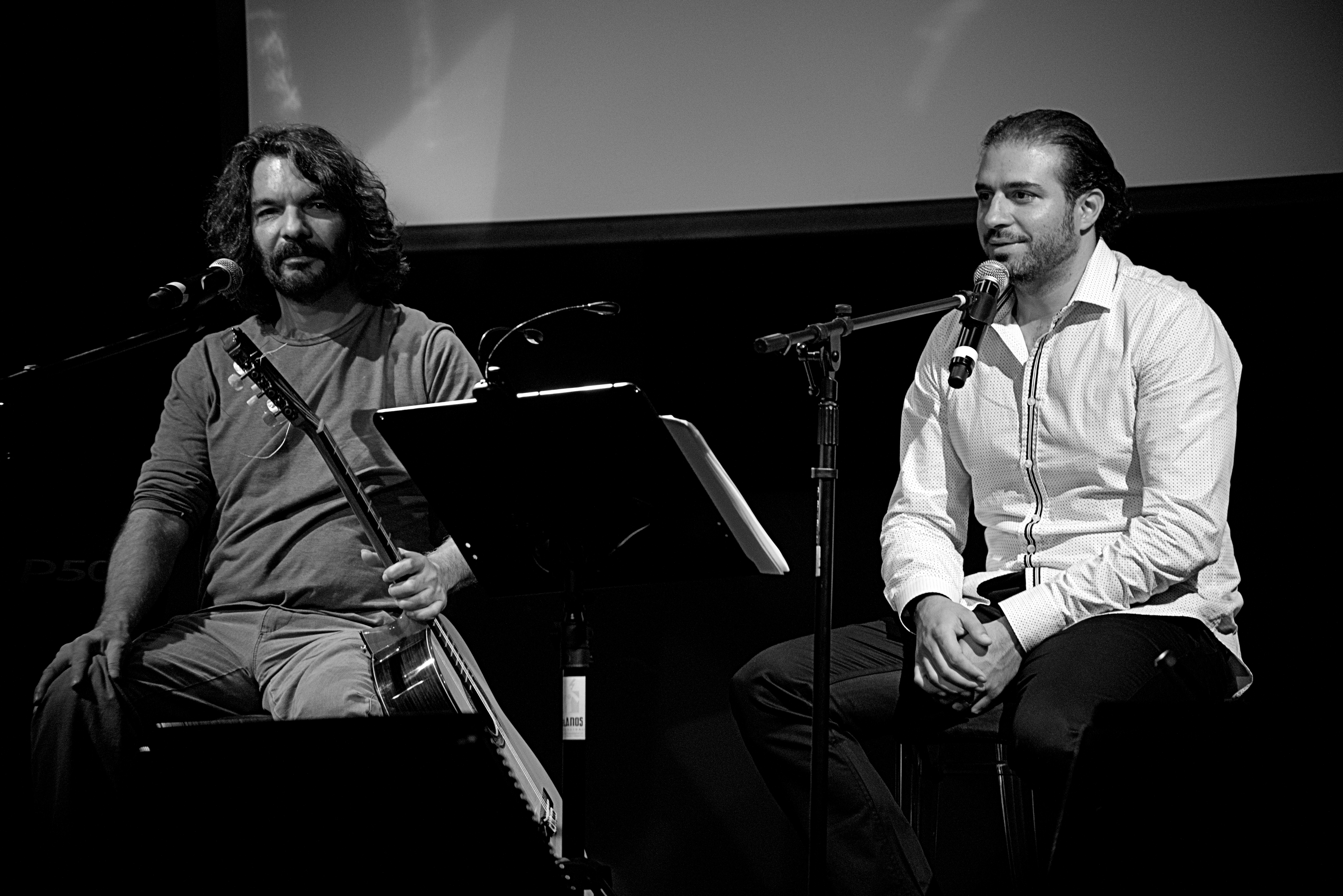
Santiago Feliú

Santiago Vicente Feliú Sierra (March 29, 1962 – February 12, 2014) was a Cuban singer and songwriter. Born in Havana, he became part of the musical movement known as nueva trova, which was the Cuban manifestation of the nueva canción movement and included such singers as Frank Delgado and Carlos Varela. Feliú wrote the songs "For Barbara" and "Without Julieta" and recorded 11 albums. His last album, Oh Life, came out in 2010.

On 12 February 2014, he felt severe pain in his chest and died of a heart attack before he could reach the hospital in Havana. He was 51 years old.

== See also ==
- List of musicians who play left-handed
