= Tacuarembó Department =

Department of Uruguay

Tacuarembó
- Department
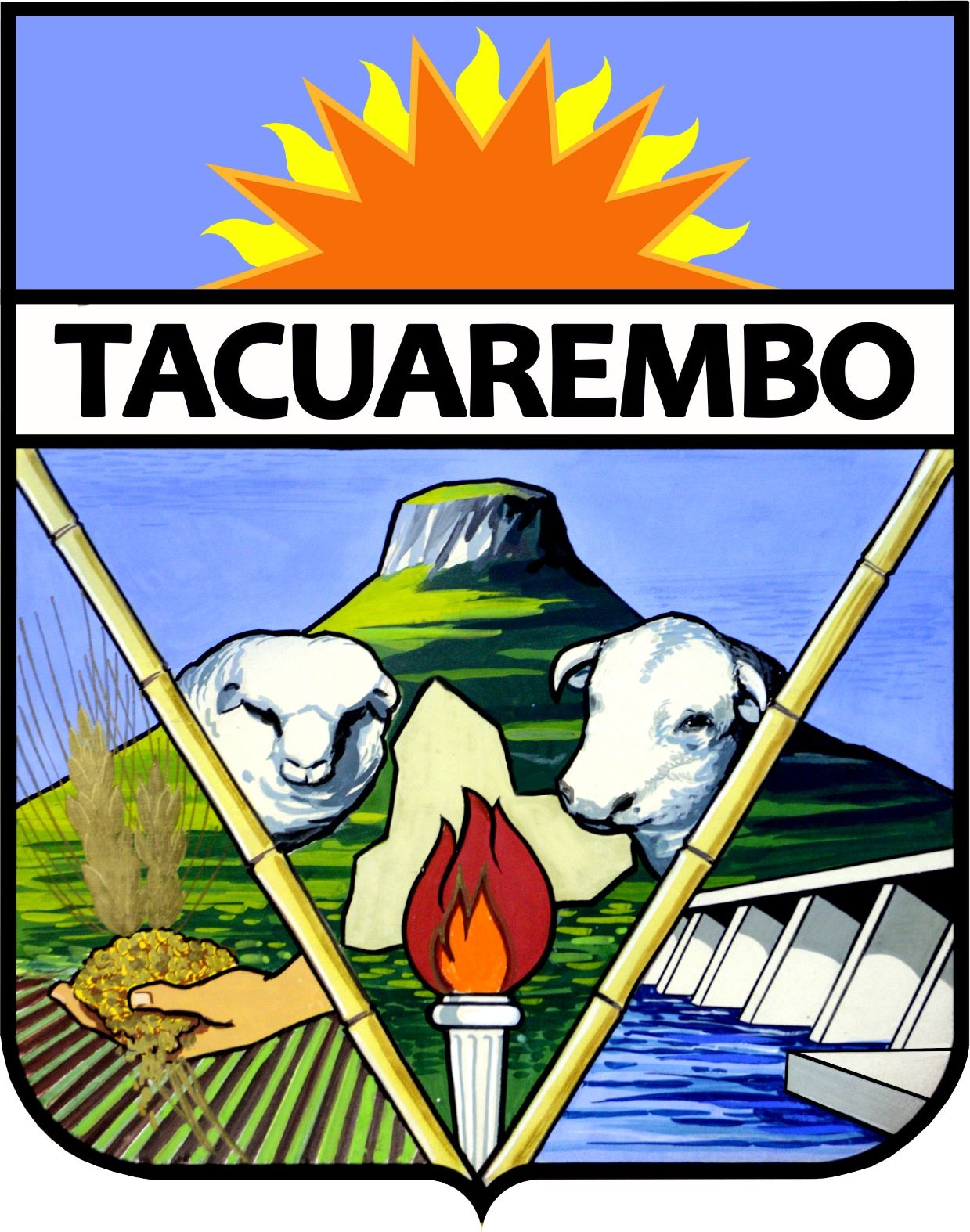
- Coat of arms

- Location of Tacuarembó Department in Uruguay
- Coordinates (Tacuarembó): 31°44′S 55°59′W
- Country: Uruguay
- Capital of Department: Tacuarembó

Government
  - Intendant: Wilson Ezquerra Martinotti
  - Ruling party: Partido Nacional

Area
  - Total: 15,438 km^{2} (5,961 sq mi)
- Elevation: 113 m (371 ft)

Population (2023 census)
  - Total: 96,013
  - Density: 6.2193/km^{2} (16.108/sq mi)
- Demonym: Tacuaremboense
- Time zone: UTC-3 (UYT)
- ISO 3166 code: UY-TA
- Website: imtacuarembo.gub.uy

Tacuarembó (Spanish pronunciation: [takwaɾemˈbo]) is the largest department of Uruguay and it is part of its northern region. Its capital is Tacuarembó. It borders Rivera Department to its north and east, the departments of Salto, Paysandú and Río Negro to its west and has the river Río Negro flowing along its south border, separating it from the departments of Durazno and Cerro Largo.

== History ==
The first division of the Republic in six departments happened in 1816. Two more departments were formed later in that year. At that time, Paysandú Department included all the territory north of the Río Negro, which included the current departments of Artigas, Rivera, Tacuarembó, Salto, Paysandú and Río Negro. On 17 June 1837 a new division of Uruguay was made and this territory was divided in three parts. In the new division, the Tacuarembó Department included also the actual department of Rivera, until it was split from it in 1884.

== Geography ==
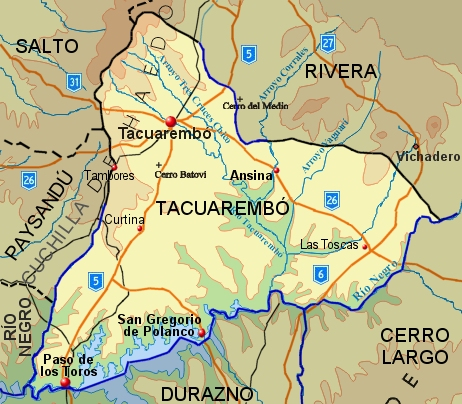
Topographic map of Tacuarembó Department showing main populated places and roads

The south borders of the department are delimited by Río Negro, which, as a result of the dam near Paso de los Toros along its course, forms the Rincón del Bonete Reservoir, also called the Gabriel Terra Reservoir. With a surface area of about 4,000 square miles (10,000 km^{2}), it is the largest reservoir in South America. Tributary streams and rivers to the Río Negro, from east to west are: Río Tacuarembó with its many tributaries, Arroyo de Clara with its tributary Arroyo del Sarandí, Arroyo Malo with its tributaries Arroyo Rolón and Arroyo Guaviyú. Into the Rincón del Bonete Reservoir discharge the streams Arroyo Carpintería, Arroyo Laureles, Arroyo Achar, Arroyo del Tigre Chico and Arroyo Cardoso.

Part of the western border of the department with if formed by Arroyo Salsipuedes Grande, which discharges further downstream the Río Negro, into the Rincón de Baygorria Reservoir. A tributary of this stream is Arroyo Salsipuedes Chico.

Tributaries of Río Tacuarembó flowing through most of the north of the department, from east to west, are: Arroyo Caraguatá with its tributaries Arroyo Coronilla, Bañado de los Cinco Sauces and Bañado del Turupí, Arroyo Yaguarí with its tributaries Arroyo Carpintería and Arroyo Cuaró, Arroyo Zapucay, Arroyo Cuñapirú, Arroyo Laureles which also forms part of the northern border of the department, Arroyo de las Cañas, Arroyo Tacuarembó Chico with its tributaries Arroyo Tres Cruces, Arroyo Tranqueras and Arroyo Batoví, and Arroyo Veras. A small lake named Laguna Paolino forms on the west side of Arroyo Yaguarí near Ansina.

Along the west border of the department runs the hill range Cuchilla de Haedo, forming the hills Cerro de las Minas, Cerros de Batoví, Cerro Charrúa and Cerro Lambaré. Further to the west is also the hill Cerro del Ñandubal.

== Demographics ==
Ethnic groups in Tacuarembó (2023 est.)
Ethnic groups	Percent
White	79.2%
Black	15.1%
Indigenous	9.6%
Asian	0.7%
None/Other/Unspecified	7.4%

As of the census of 2011, Tacuarembó Department had a population of 90,053 (male and female) and 37,647 households.

Demographic data for Tacuarembó Department in 2010:

- Population growth rate: 0.786%
- Birth Rate: 16.69 births/1,000 people
- Death Rate: 8.21 deaths/1,000 people
- Average age: 31.1 (29.7 male, 32.4 female)
- Life Expectancy at Birth:
  - Total population: 76.17
  - Male: 71.70
  - Female: 81.32
- Average per household income: 21,854 pesos/month
- Urban per capita income: 8,844 pesos/month

2010 Data Source:

Main Urban Centres
Other towns and villages
Numbers of population as per 2011 census.

City / Town	Population
Tacuarembó	54,755
Paso de los Toros	12,985
San Gregorio de Polanco	3,415
Ansina	2,712
Las Toscas	1,142
Curtina	1,037

Town / Village	Population
Achar	687
Paso Bonilla	510
Cruz de los Caminos	463
Tambores	450
Balneario Iporá	298

Rural population
According to the 2011 census, Tacuarembó department has a rural population of 9,660.

== See also ==
- List of populated places in Uruguay#Tacuarembó Department
- Carlos Gardel#Birthplace controversy
- Valle Edén
- Cerro Batoví

== Bibliography ==
- Domínguez, Carlos María (2004). El norte profundo (in Spanish). Montevideo: Ediciones de la Banda Oriental.
