= Tacuarembó =

- Capital city
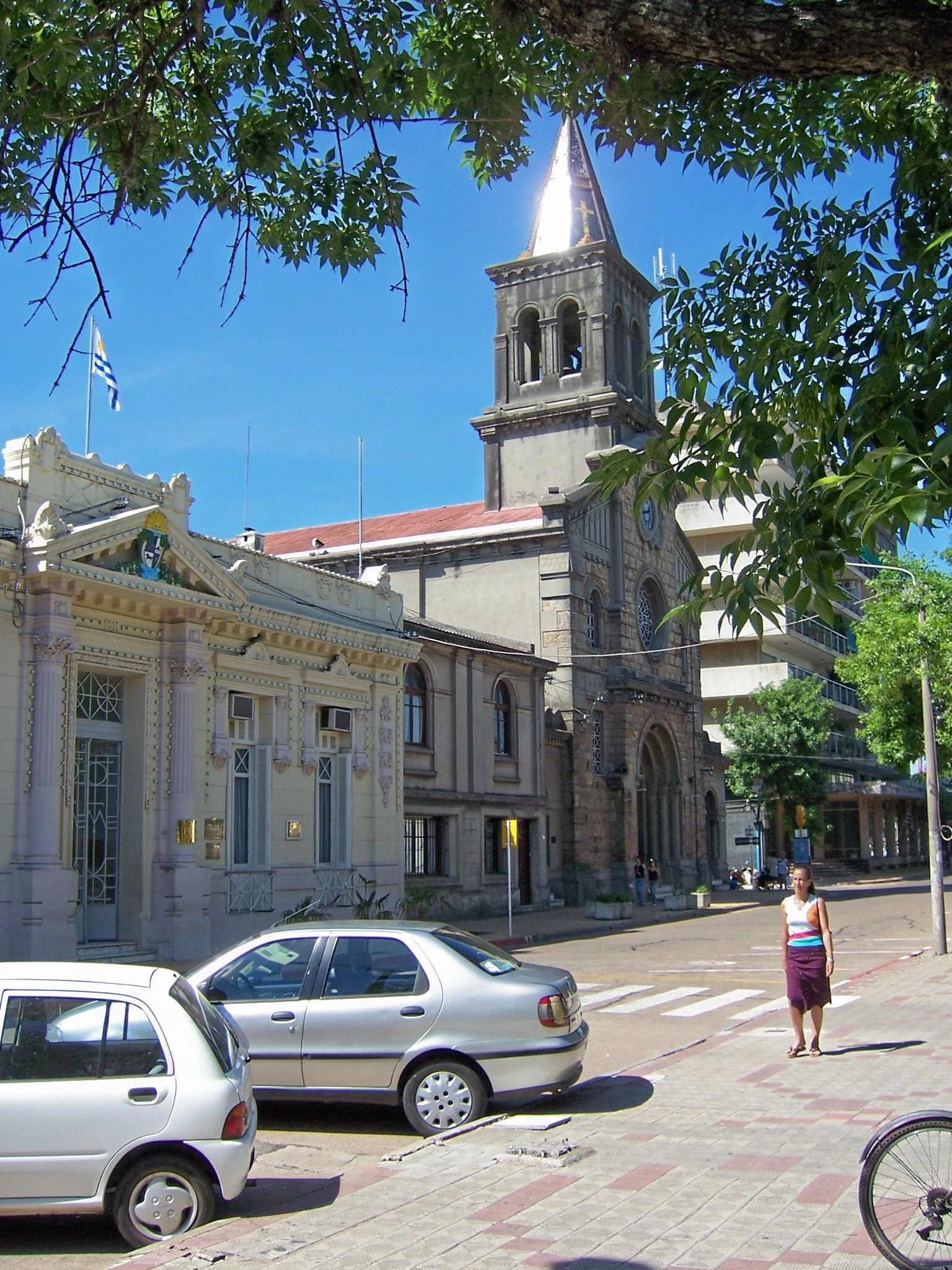
- Governmental building and Cathedral of St. Fructuosus

- Location within Uruguay
- Coordinates: 31°44′0″S 55°59′0″W
- Country: Uruguay
- Department: Tacuarembó Department
- Founded: January 21, 1832
- Founder: Bernabé Rivera

Government
  - City Manager: Wilson Ezquerra Martinotti

Area
  - Total: 42.0 km^{2} (16.2 sq mi)
- Elevation: 137 m (449 ft)

Population (2023 Census)
  - Total: 60,586
  - Density: 1,440/km^{2} (3,740/sq mi)
  - Rank: 8th
  - Demonym: tacuaremboense
- Time zone: UTC -3
- Postal code: 45000
- Dial plan: +598 463 (+5 digits)
- Climate: Cfa

Tacuarembó (Spanish pronunciation: [ta.kwa.ɾemˈbo] Guarani: Takuarembo, literally: "Bamboo shoot") is the capital city of the Tacuarembó Department in north-central Uruguay.

== History ==
On 24 October 1831, a presidential decree by Fructuoso Rivera ordered the creation of a city in the region. The task was entrusted to the President's brother, Colonel Bernabé Rivera.

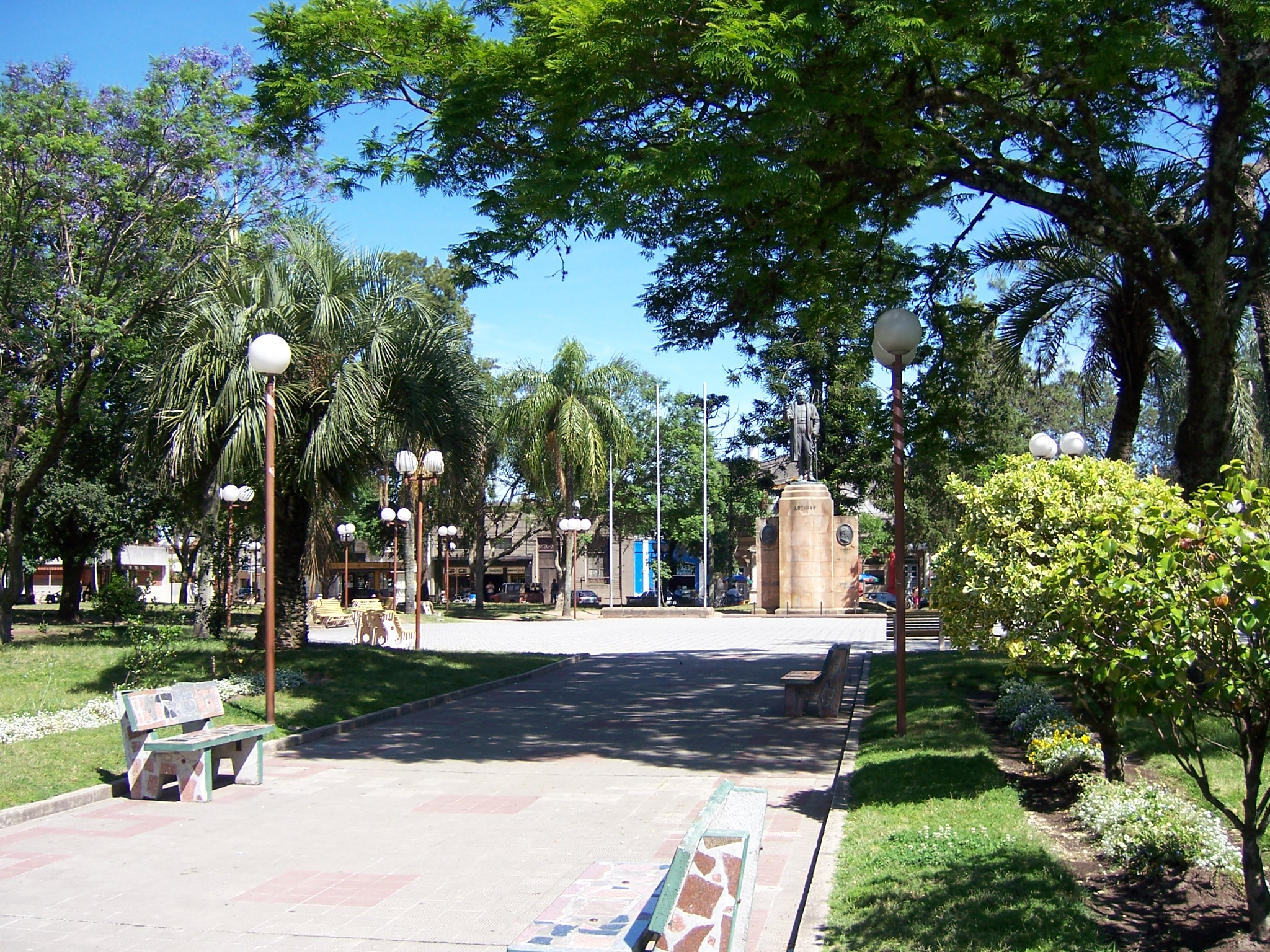
Plaza 19 de Abril

Colonel Rivera left Montevideo on a three-month journey with a caravan of wagons and families, towards the shore of the Tacuaremboty River, which in the Guaraní language means "river of the reeds". The area was surveyed and divided into blocks for settlement. On January 21, 1832, Coronel Rivera founded the town under the name "San Fructuoso", after Saint Fructuosus of Tarragona (whose Saint's Day is January 21) and after his (Benjamin's) brother.

By 1837, San Fructuoso was a growing town. It had more than 500 residents, a justice of the peace, a military commander, a parish priest, a mayor, and a Public Works Commission. On 16 June 1837, the Tacuarembó Department was created (along with Salto and Paysandú), and San Fructuoso was named the capital.

Over time, the community continued to grow. According to the Act of Ley Nº 2.389, on 17 July 1895 it held the status of "Villa" (town). Its name changed to "Tacuarembó", and on 24 June 1912, its status was elevated to "Ciudad" (city) by the Act of Ley Nº 4.031.

Since 1986, the Fiesta de la Patria Gaucha (Festival of the Gaucho Homeland) has been held on the outskirts of the city. This event celebrates gaucho culture in Uruguay and attracts thousands of visitors from both Uruguay and neighboring countries.

== Population ==
In 2023, Tacuarembó had a population of 60,586.

Year	Population
1908	7,546
1963	28,182
1975	37,692
1985	40,511
1996	45,891
2004	51,224
2011	54,755
2023	60,586

Source: National Statistics Institute

== Geography ==
The city is located on Km. 390 of Route 5, 113 kilometres (70 mi) south-southwest of Rivera, the capital city of the Rivera Department. Routes 26 and 31 also meet Route 5 within the city limits. The stream Arroyo Tacuarembó Chico, a tributary of Río Tacuarembó, flows through the north part of the city. As of the census of 2011, it is the eighth most populated city of the country.

=== Climate ===
Tacuarembó has a humid subtropical climate, described by the Köppen climate classification as Cfa. Summers are warm to hot and winters are cool, with frequent frosts and fog. The precipitation is evenly distributed throughout the year, with an average of 1,165 mm (45.87 in), and the annual average temperature is 18 °C (64.4 °F).

Climate data for Tacuarembó (1980–2009)
Month	Jan	Feb	Mar	Apr	May	Jun	Jul	Aug	Sep	Oct	Nov	Dec	Year
Mean daily maximum °C (°F)	30.3 (86.5)	29.1 (84.4)	27.6 (81.7)	23.7 (74.7)	19.9 (67.8)	17.1 (62.8)	17.0 (62.6)	19.1 (66.4)	20.1 (68.2)	23.4 (74.1)	26.1 (79.0)	28.7 (83.7)	23.5 (74.3)
Daily mean °C (°F)	24.5 (76.1)	23.7 (74.7)	22.3 (72.1)	18.7 (65.7)	15.1 (59.2)	12.6 (54.7)	12.2 (54.0)	13.8 (56.8)	15.0 (59.0)	18.1 (64.6)	20.5 (68.9)	22.9 (73.2)	18.3 (64.9)
Mean daily minimum °C (°F)	18.7 (65.7)	18.4 (65.1)	17.1 (62.8)	13.8 (56.8)	10.4 (50.7)	8.1 (46.6)	7.4 (45.3)	8.6 (47.5)	9.8 (49.6)	12.8 (55.0)	14.9 (58.8)	17.2 (63.0)	13.1 (55.6)
Average precipitation mm (inches)	117.6 (4.63)	137.8 (5.43)	144.7 (5.70)	159.3 (6.27)	126.8 (4.99)	104.1 (4.10)	75.2 (2.96)	79.0 (3.11)	107.1 (4.22)	133.5 (5.26)	120.2 (4.73)	121.4 (4.78)	1,426.6 (56.17)
Average relative humidity (%)	66	70	72	74	77	79	76	73	72	71	68	66	72
Mean monthly sunshine hours	282.1	228.8	226.3	180.0	176.7	141.0	164.3	182.9	189.0	220.1	252.0	272.8	2,516
Mean daily sunshine hours	9.1	8.1	7.3	6.0	5.7	4.7	5.3	5.9	6.3	7.1	8.4	8.8	6.9
Source: Instituto Nacional de Investigación Agropecuaria

== Places of worship ==
- St. Fructuosus Cathedral (Roman Catholic)
- Holy Cross Parish Church (Roman Catholic)
- St. Joseph Parish Church (Roman Catholic)
- Our Lady of Lourdes Parish Church (Roman Catholic)

== Notable people ==
Writers Circe Maia, Mario Benedetti, Tomás de Mattos, and Jorge Majfud are from Tacuarembó, as is José Núñez, 19th century Nicaraguan politician. Some Uruguayans claim that the tango musician Carlos Gardel was born near Tacuarembó, in the village of Valle Edén. Scholarly consensus is that he was born in Toulouse, France, then raised in Buenos Aires, but as an adult he obtained legal papers saying he was born in Tacuarembó, probably to avoid French military authorities. Adrian Luna who plays for Kerala Blasters in the Indian Super League and dancer Martha Gularte were born here. Painter Gustavo Alamón was also from Tacuarembó.

== In popular culture ==
The city serves as the setting for the short story The Shape of the Sword by Jorge Luis Borges, as well as for the 2010 film Miss Tacuarembó. It is also mentioned in the popular folk song Cuando Cante el Gallo Azul by the duo Larbanois – Carrero, which is based on a poem by Washington Benavides.

== See also ==
- Cerro Batoví
