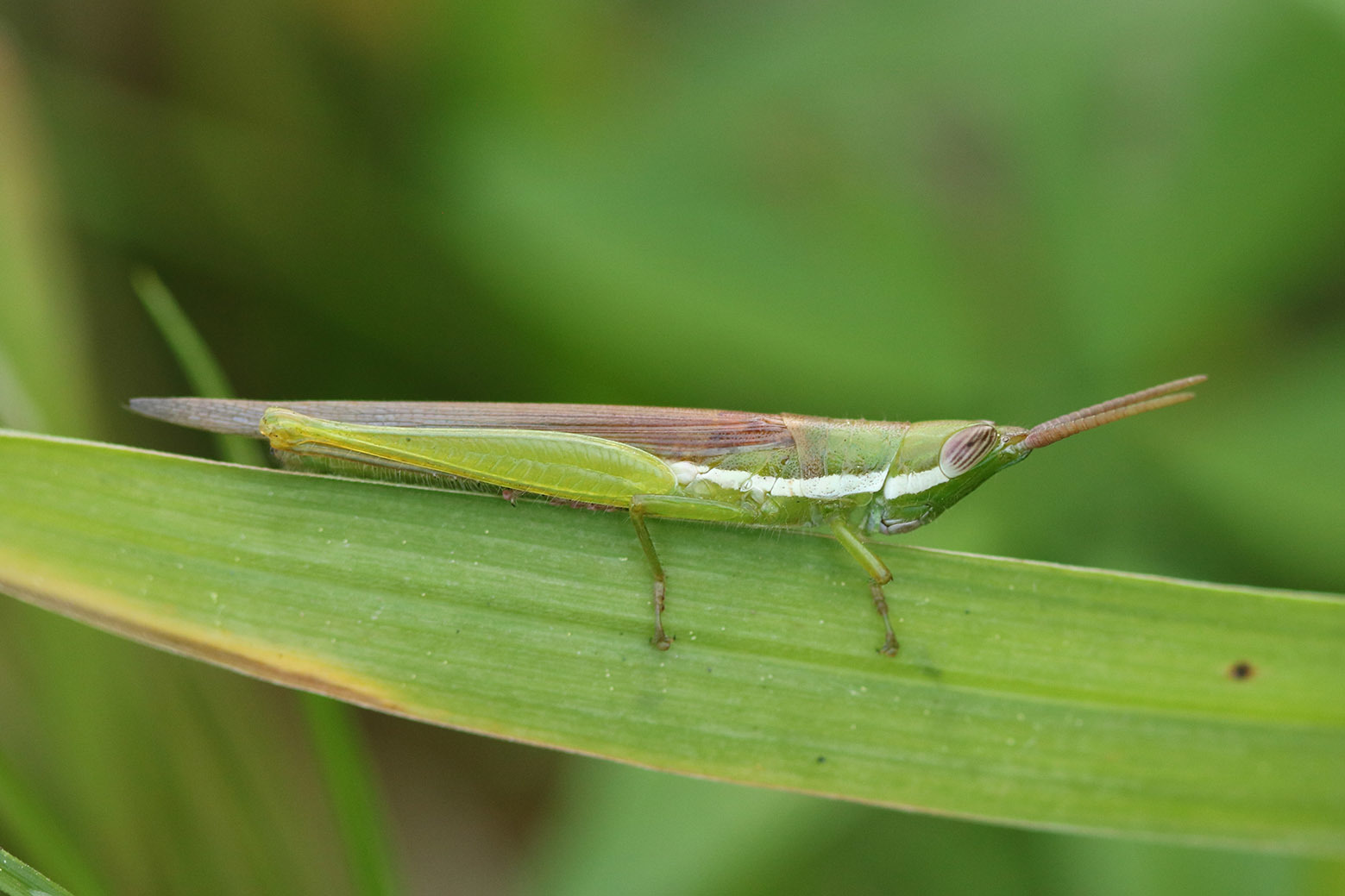
- Tucayaca gracilis, Argentina

Scientific classification
- Kingdom: Animalia
- Phylum: Arthropoda
- Clade: Pancrustacea
- Class: Insecta
- Order: Orthoptera
- Suborder: Caelifera
- Family: Acrididae
- Subfamily: Leptysminae
- Tribe: Leptysmini
- Genus: Tucayaca
- Species: T. gracilis

Binomial name
- Tucayaca gracilis (Giglio-Tos, 1897)

= Tucayaca gracilis =

Species of grasshopper

Tucayaca gracilis is a species of spur-throat toothpick grasshopper in the family Acrididae. It is found in South America.
