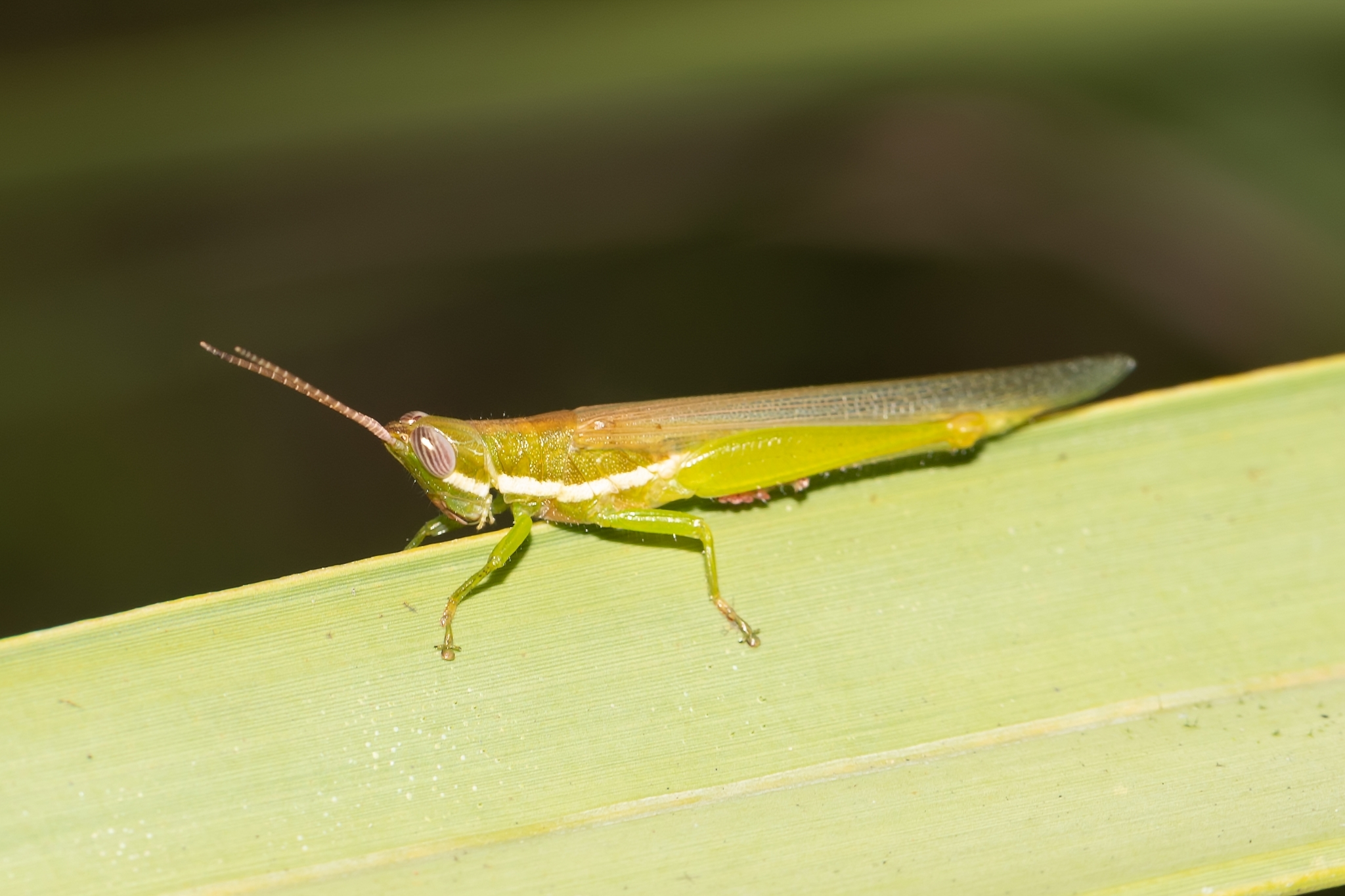

Scientific classification
- Kingdom: Animalia
- Phylum: Arthropoda
- Clade: Pancrustacea
- Class: Insecta
- Order: Orthoptera
- Suborder: Caelifera
- Family: Acrididae
- Subfamily: Leptysminae
- Genus: Stenacris
- Species: S. vitreipennis

Binomial name
- Stenacris vitreipennis (Marschall, 1836)

= Stenacris vitreipennis =

Species of grasshopper

Stenacris vitreipennis, known generally as the glassy-winged toothpick grasshopper or glassy-winged locust, is a species of spur-throat toothpick grasshopper in the family Acrididae. It is found in North America and South America.

The average size of a male viteipennis is about 24–30 mm and that of a female is 27–40 mm. They have green to brownish green, long, slender, pointed head, sword-shaped antennae and spine beneath head in front of forelegs, distinguishing it from somewhat similar slant-faced grasshoppers, subfamily Gomphocerinae.

They are usually found in semiaquatic vegetation such as cattails (Typha spp.) and Pickerelweed (Pontederia cordata).

== See also ==
Orthopetra species file
