= Lucrecia Covelo =

Uruguayan scientist

Lucrecia Covelo de Zolessi (12 January 1920 – 9 March 2000) was a Uruguayan entomologist, curator and film-maker, who taught at the Faculty of Humanities and Sciences at the University of the Republic, where she was Chair of the Entomology department.

== Biography ==
Covelo was part of the first cohort to study for a BA in Biological Sciences at the Faculty of Humanities and Sciences of Montevideo (es), a course which began in 1947. During her degree, she focussed the morphology and ethology of hymenoptera and crustaceans. She was an early exponent of using film in the natural sciences, directing a film in 1959 on the sexual behaviours of Bothriurus bonariensis. From 1962 to 1963, she studied at the University of Sorbonne, and obtained her doctorate there. Her thesis examined the anatomy of lobsters. From 1967 she was a member of Sociedad Malacologica del Uruguay.

As an entomologist, Covelo specialised in ants, and advised companies on pesticide control. She became a pioneer of the use of artificial anthills in South America, and more generally was a leading figure in the field. One of her discoveries related to the oviposition in the Paulinia genus. She also worked on the feeding behaviour of Cornops aquaticum.

From early in her career, Covelo was linked to the National Museum of Natural History (MNHN), first as a student and subsequently as a researcher and conservation lead on the Entomological Collection. She taught at the Faculty of Humanities and Sciences of Montevideo, where she was in charge of the Arthropod Department and the Entomology Chair.

== Selected bibliography ==
- Goñi, Beatriz, Lucrecia C. De Zolessi, and Hirotami T. Imai. "Karyotypes of thirteen ant species from Uruguay (Hymenoptera, Formicidae)." Caryologia 36.4 (1983): 363-371.
- de Zolessi, Lucrecia Covelo. "Morphologie, endosquelette et musculature d'un acridien aptère (Orthoptera: Proscopiidae)." Transactions of the Royal Entomological Society of London 120.3 (1968): 55-113.
