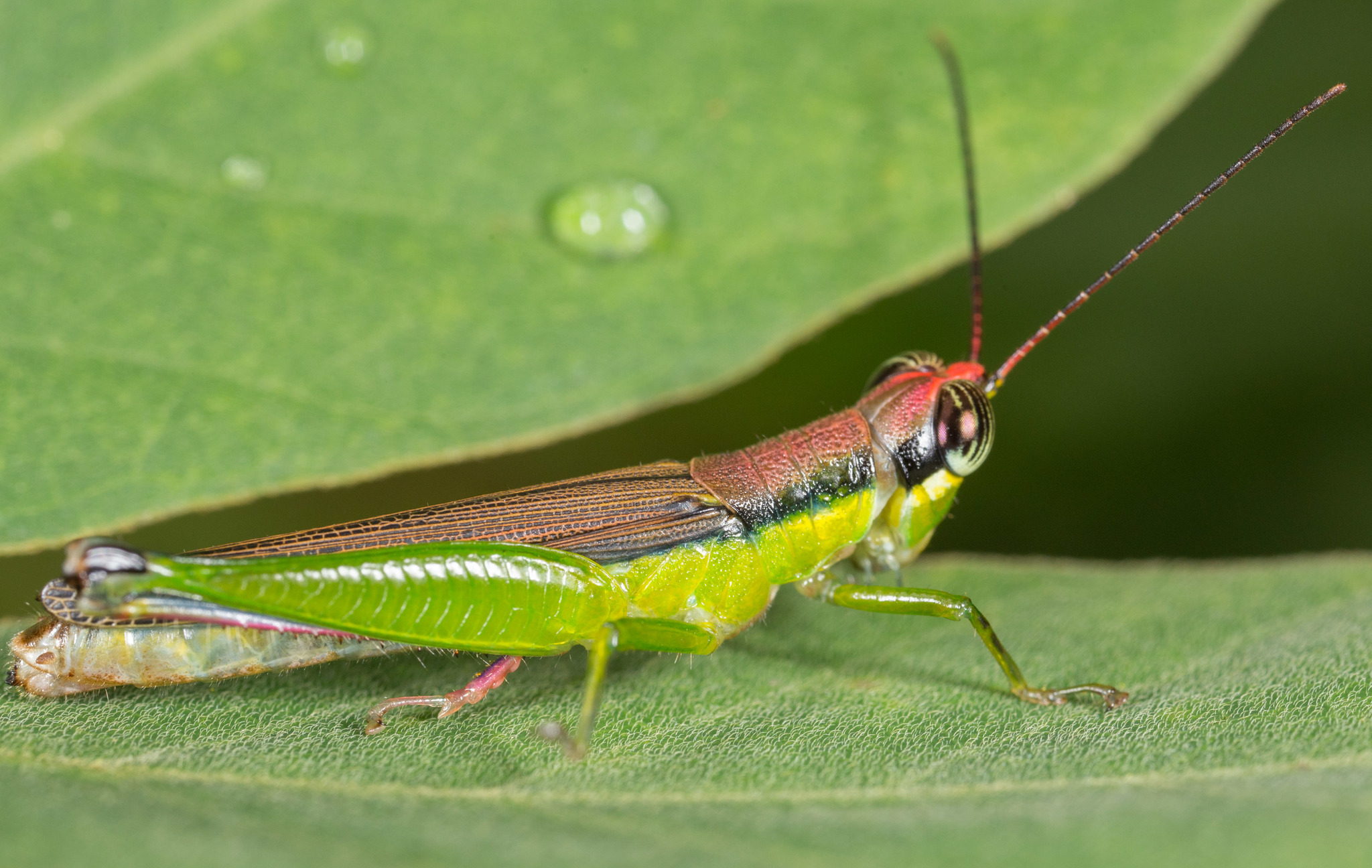
- Stenopola puncticeps, Ecuador

Scientific classification
- Kingdom: Animalia
- Phylum: Arthropoda
- Clade: Pancrustacea
- Class: Insecta
- Order: Orthoptera
- Suborder: Caelifera
- Family: Acrididae
- Subfamily: Leptysminae
- Tribe: Tetrataeniini
- Genus: Stenopola
- Species: S. puncticeps

Binomial name
- Stenopola puncticeps (Stål, 1861)

= Stenopola puncticeps =

Species of grasshopper

Stenopola puncticeps is a species of spur-throat toothpick grasshopper in the family Acrididae. It is found in Central and South America.

== Subspecies ==
These subspecies belong to the species Stenopola puncticeps:

- Stenopola puncticeps amazonica Roberts & Carbonell, 1979
- Stenopola puncticeps curtipennis Roberts & Carbonell, 1979
- Stenopola puncticeps eumera (Hebard, 1923)
- Stenopola puncticeps limbatipennis Stål, 1873
- Stenopola puncticeps puncticeps (Stål, 1861)
- Stenopola puncticeps surinama (Bruner, 1920)
- Stenopola puncticeps tenae Roberts & Carbonell, 1979
