= Víctor Scarabino =

Uruguayan malacologist

- Born: 1945
- Died: September 2, 2020 (aged 74–75); Montevideo, Uruguay
- Education: Faculty of Humanities and Sciences (University of the Republic)
- Alma mater: University of the Republic (Uruguay)
- Occupations: Marine biologist, Malacologist

Víctor Scarabino (1945 – Montevideo, September 2, 2020) was a Uruguayan marine biologist and malacologist. He served as the director of the National Museum of Natural History of Uruguay from 2009 to 2011 and was an honorary researcher at the institution from the late 1960s until his death.

== Biography and career ==
Víctor Scarabino obtained his bachelor's degree in Biological Sciences from the Faculty of Humanities and Sciences in 1977. From an early age, he also worked as a teacher at the same faculty. In 1979, he became the first Doctor of Oceanography in Uruguay upon completing his doctoral thesis titled "Les scaphopodes bathyaux et abyssaux de l'Atlantique occidental (Systématique, distribution, adaptations). Nouvelle classification pour l'ensemble de la classe," under the supervision of the Aix-Marseille University (Marine Station of Endoume).

Throughout his career, Scarabino held various prominent roles in different institutions in Uruguay. He was an honorary collaborator at the Institute of Fisheries Research and a professor at the Clemente Estable Biological Research Institute of the Faculty of Veterinary Medicine at the University of the Republic. He also worked as a technician at the former National Fisheries Institute and as a consultant in Marine Sciences for UNESCO in Montevideo and Paris. He had the opportunity to be a visiting professor at the Muséum national d'Histoire naturelle in Paris and at the Federal University of the State of Rio de Janeiro for a brief period.

Scarabino mentored numerous undergraduate and postgraduate students in Uruguay and Brazil. His prolific scientific output is reflected in hundreds of written pages on various topics related to marine biology. However, his specialization and recognition centered on scaphopod mollusks, having described more than 110 taxons, including species, genera, and families.

Scarabino died in the city of Montevideo, the capital of the Oriental Republic of Uruguay, on September 2, 2020.

== Publications ==
Scarabino was the author and co-author of various books on marine biology and malacology.

- Al borde del mar (Nuestra Tierra, 1969)
- Moluscos del Golfo San Matias (provincia de Río Negro, República Argentina): inventario y claves para su identificación (Sociedad malacológica del Uruguay, 1977)
- Un nuevo género y trece nuevas especies de Scaphopoda (Mollusca) del Océano Pacífico tropical (2010)
