= Hospital Clinic Manuel Quintela =

Hospital de Clínicas
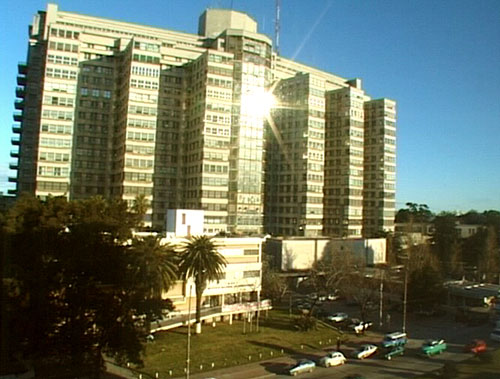
- Hospital de Clínicas, front view

Geography
- Location: 11600 Italy Ave, Montevideo, Uruguay
- Coordinates: 34°53′29.5″S 56°09′06″W

Organisation
- Care system: Public, university hospital, teaching hospital
- Type: General
- Affiliated university: University of the Republic

History
- Founded: 1953

Links
- Website: Hospital de Clínicas

Hospital de Clínicas Dr. Manuel Quintela is a hospital in the Parque Batlle neighborhood of Montevideo, Uruguay. It serves as the teaching hospital of the University of the Republic. It functions as a general hospital, and is a general reference institution. The building was designed by architect Carlos Surraco in 1928–1929. The hospital was inaugurated on 21 September 1953. For many years it was led by Hugo Villar, who was a considerable influence on the institution. The hospital has a built-up area of 110,000 m^{2} on 23 floors arranged.

== Areas of specialization ==
- Neonatology
- Dermatology
- Endocrinology
- Geriatrics
- Hematology
- Nephrology
- Neurology
- Gastroenterology
- Oncology
- Psychology
- Psychiatry
- Physical medicine and rehabilitation
- Gynaecology
- Neurosurgery
- Cardiac surgery
- Ophthalmology
- Otorhinolaryngology
- Urology
- Dentistry
- Plastic surgery
- Anesthesiology
- Radiology
- Nuclear medicine
- Anatomical pathology
- Hemotherapy
- Electroencephalography
- Toxicology
- Centro Nacional de Quemados (National Center for Burns)
- Instituto Nacional de Donación y Trasplante (National Institute for Donation and Transplantation)
- Laboratorio de Exploración Funcional Respiratoria (Laboratory of Functional Respiratory Exploration)

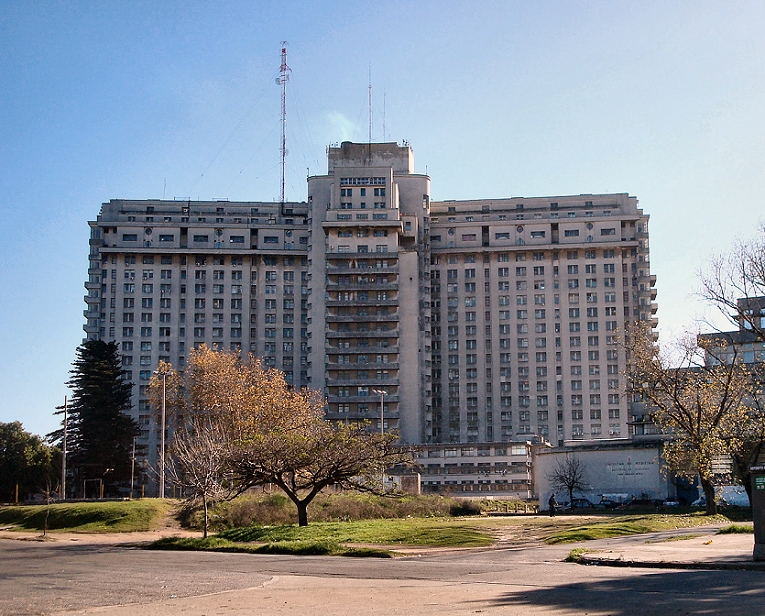
Hospital de Clínicas as seen from Parque Batlle

== Authorities ==
The board of directors is made up of representatives of teachers, graduates, students and non-teaching officers.

=== List of directors ===
Director	Term of office	
Dr. Hugo Enríquez Frodden	1956	1956
Dr. Guillermo Almenara	1958	1960
Dr. Hugo Villar Tejeiro	1960	1974
Hospital Intervention (Military Dictatorship)	1974	1985
Dr. Hugo Villar Tejeiro	1985	1991
Dr. Samuel Villalba González	1992	1996
Dr. Graciela Ubach Cancela	2000	2010
Dr. Víctor Fernando Tonto Muñoz	2011	2015
Dr. Raquel Ballesté	2015	2016
Dr. Graciela Ubach Cancela	2017	2020
Dr. Álvaro Villar	2020	Incumbent
