= Carlos Surraco =

Uruguayan architect

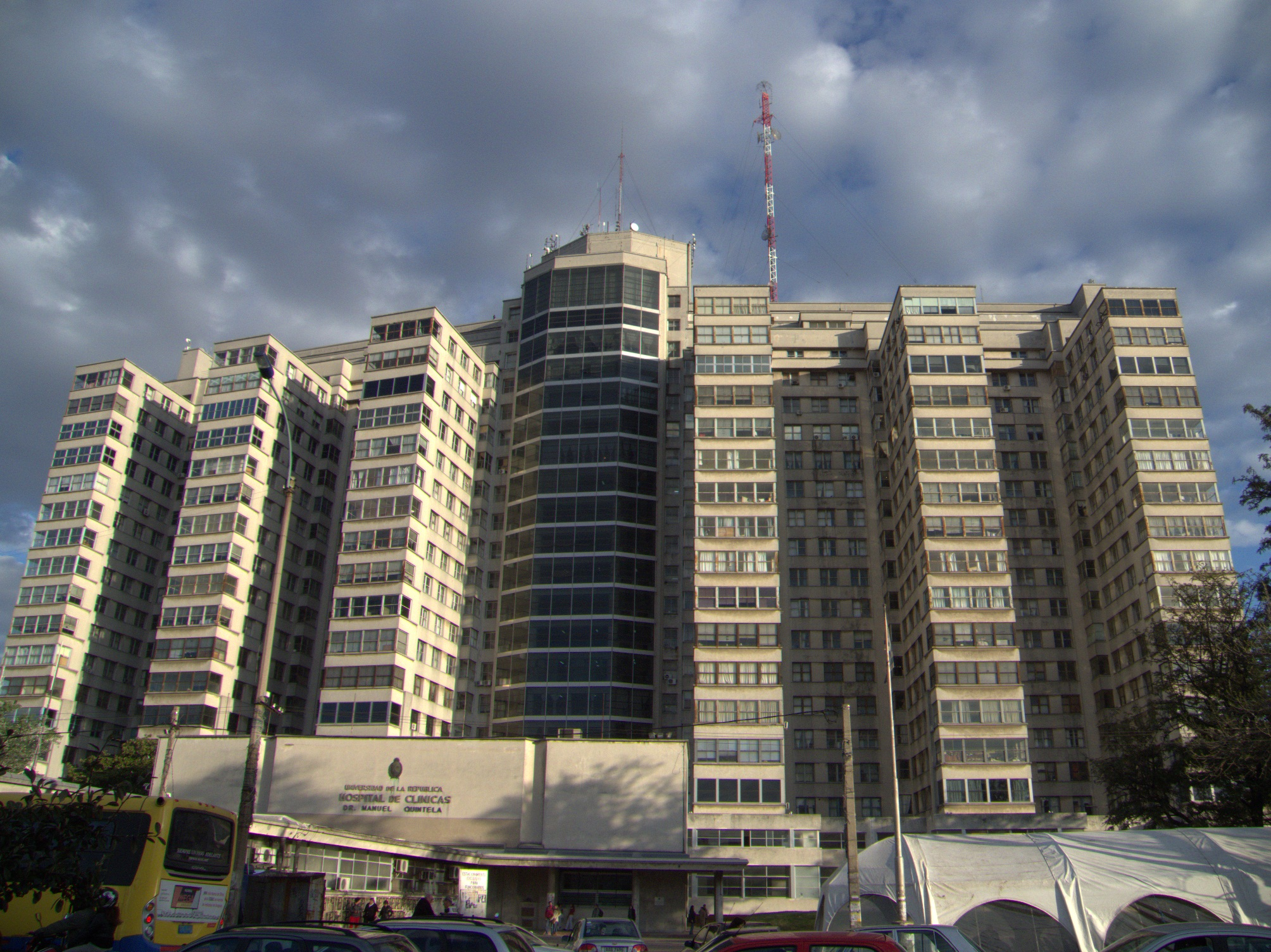
Clinic Hospital in Montevideo.

Carlos Alfonso Surraco Cantera, often credited as Carlos A. Surraco (Montevideo, 1894 - Montevideo, 1976) was a Uruguayan architect. He was part of a notable generation of architects which included, among others, Alberto Muñoz del Campo, Juan Antonio Rius, Rodolfo Amargós, Jorge Caprario, Guillermo Armas, Jorge Herrán, Rodolfo Vigouroux and José Pedro Sierra Morató.

== Selected works ==
- 1925: Barth & Cía. storehouse (with Luis Topolansky)
- 1928-1953: Manuel Quintela Clinic Hospital - his paramount work
- 1928-1929: Hygien Institute
- 1936-1941: Alejandro Beisso clinic at Hospital Pereira Rossell
- 1936-1941: Traumatology Institute
- 1938-1942: Martirené Pavilion, Hospital Saint Bois
- 1952: Expansion of Ospedale Italiano Umberto I

== Bibliography ==
- Loustau, César (1990). La influencia de Italia en la arquitectura uruguaya (in Spanish). Montevideo: Istituto Italiano di Cultura in Uruguay. p. 95.
- Lucchini, Aurelio (1969). Ideas y formas en la arquitectura nacional. Colección Nuestra Tierra, vol. 6 (in Spanish). Montevideo.
- Lucchini, Aurelio (1986). El Concepto de Arquitectura y su traducción a formas en el territorio que hoy pertenece a Uruguay (in Spanish). Montevideo: UdelaR.
- Rey Ashfield, William (2012). Arquitectura moderna en Montevideo (1920-1960) (in Spanish). Montevideo: Facultad de Arquitectura.
