= Dámaso Antonio Larrañaga =

Uruguayan priest, naturalist and botanist

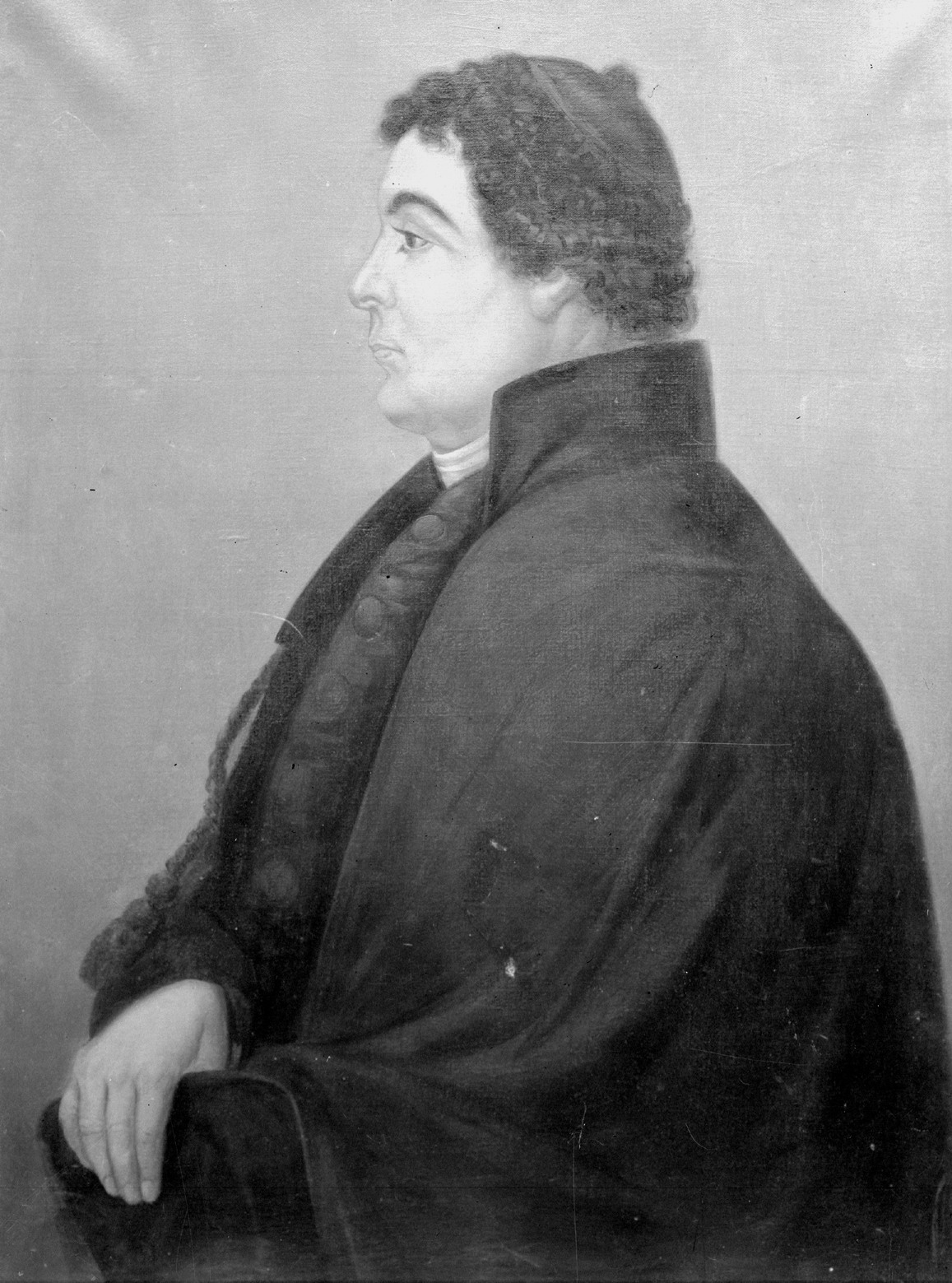
Dámaso Antonio Larrañaga

Dámaso Antonio Larrañaga (Montevideo, 9 December 1771 – Montevideo, 16 February 1848) was a Uruguayan priest, naturalist and botanist.

He was one of those principally responsible for the founding of the National Library of Uruguay and the National University of Uruguay. Further, in 1837, he was part of a committee in charge of establishing the National Museum of Natural History.

The private Universidad Católica del Uruguay Dámaso Antonio Larrañaga (established 1985) is named after him.

== Bibliography ==
- Escritos de Don Dámaso Antonio Larrañaga. Montevideo: Instituto Histórico y Geográfico del Uruguay, 1922-1924, 3 v.
