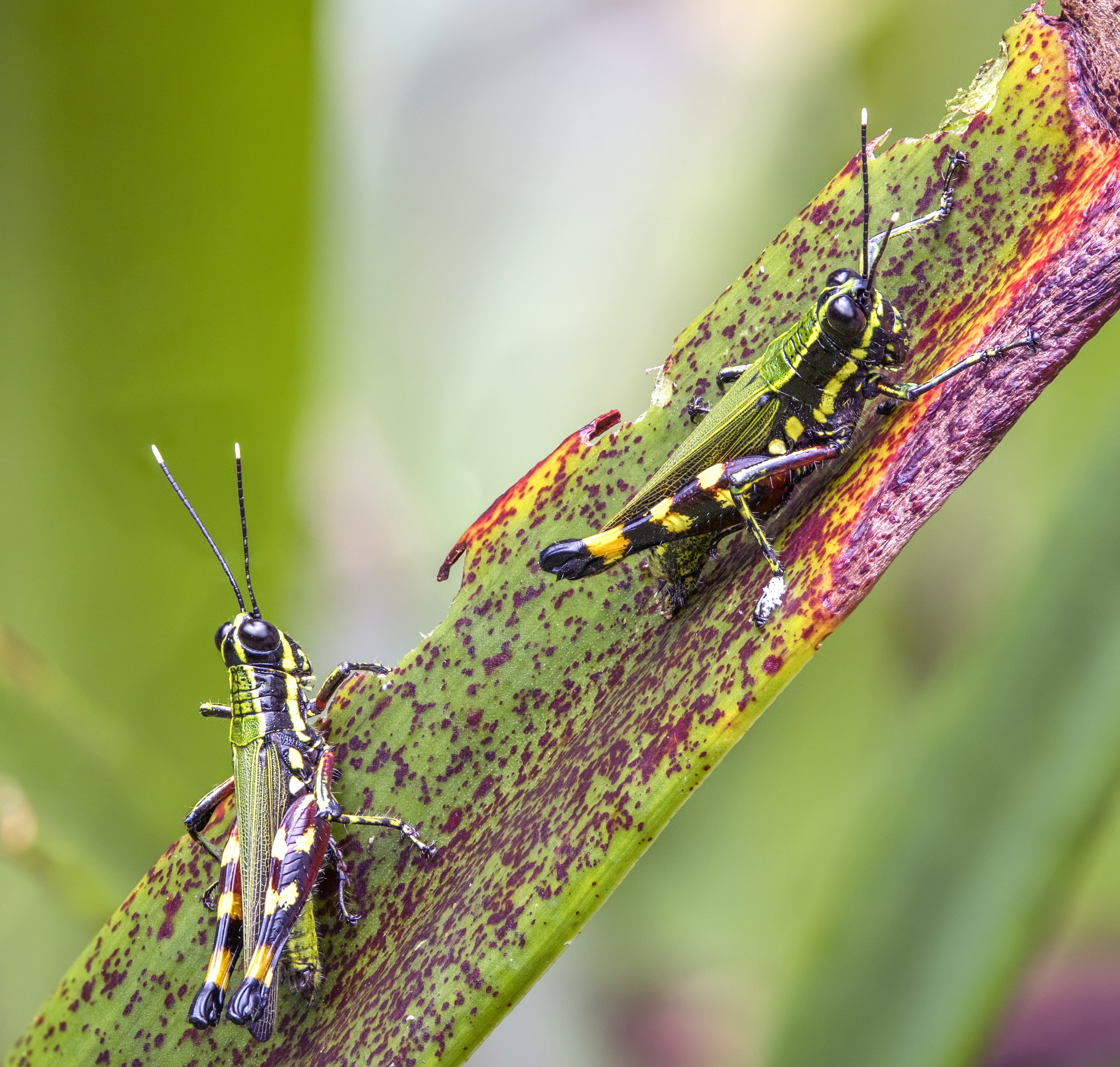
- in Ecuador

Scientific classification
- Kingdom: Animalia
- Phylum: Arthropoda
- Clade: Pancrustacea
- Class: Insecta
- Order: Orthoptera
- Suborder: Caelifera
- Family: Acrididae
- Subfamily: Leptysminae
- Tribe: Tetrataeniini
- Genus: Tetrataenia
- Species: T. surinama

Binomial name
- Tetrataenia surinama (Linnaeus, 1764)

= Tetrataenia surinama =

Species of grasshopper

Tetrataenia surinama is a species of spur-throat toothpick grasshopper in the family Acrididae. It is found in South America.
