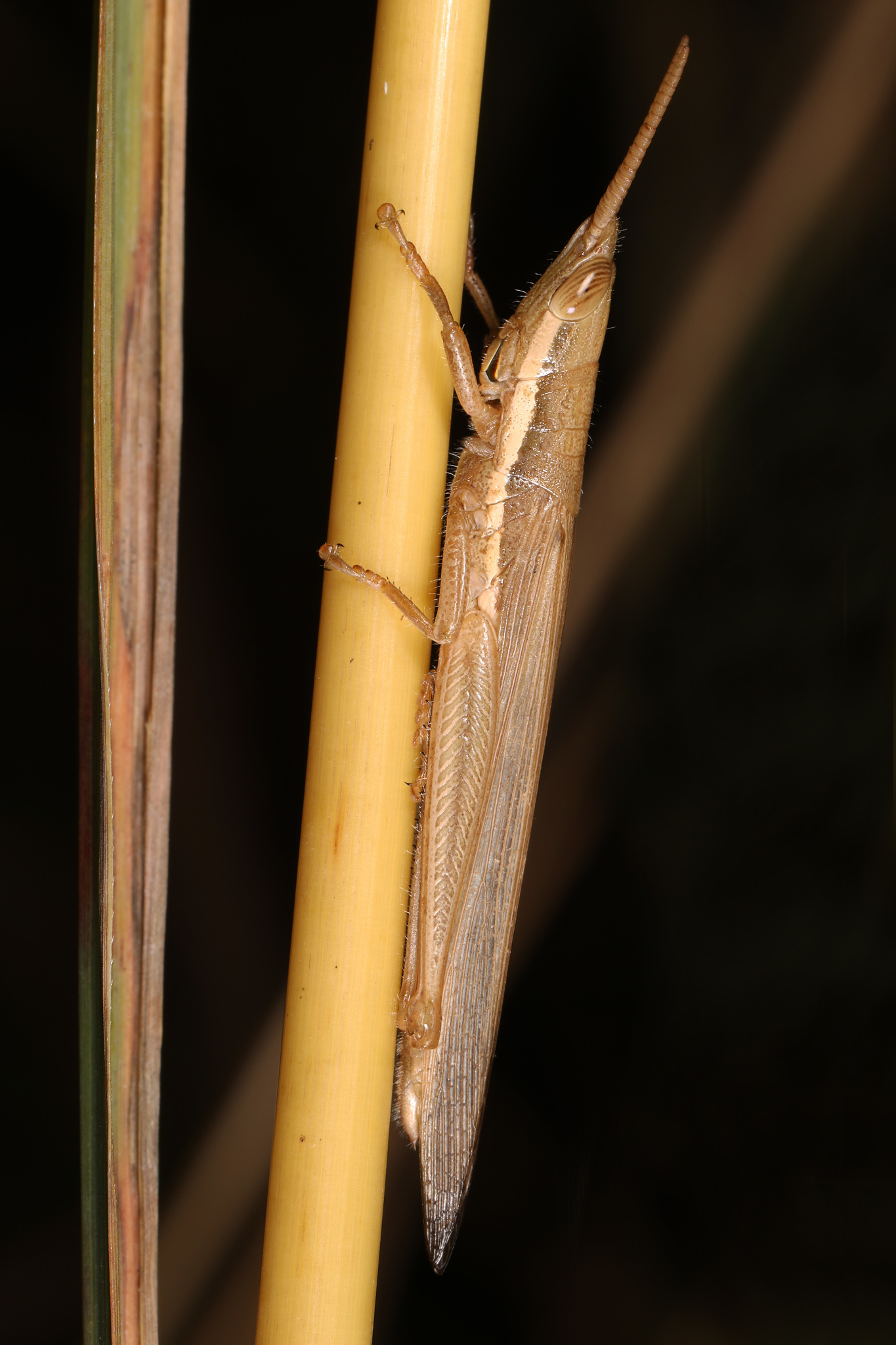
- Leptysma marginicollis, cattail toothpick grasshopper, Virginia

Scientific classification
- Kingdom: Animalia
- Phylum: Arthropoda
- Clade: Pancrustacea
- Class: Insecta
- Order: Orthoptera
- Suborder: Caelifera
- Family: Acrididae
- Subfamily: Leptysminae
- Tribe: Leptysmini
- Genus: Leptysma; Stål, 1873

= Leptysma =

Genus of grasshoppers

Leptysma is a genus of spur-throat toothpick grasshoppers in the family Acrididae. There are about five described species in Leptysma.

== Species ==
These five species belong to the genus Leptysma:

- Leptysma argentina Bruner, 1906
- Leptysma filiformis (Serville, 1838)
- Leptysma intermedia Bruner, 1911
- Leptysma marginicollis (Serville, 1838) (cattail toothpick grasshopper)
- Leptysma tainan Rehn & Hebard, 1938
