= Jorge Herrán =

Uruguayan architect

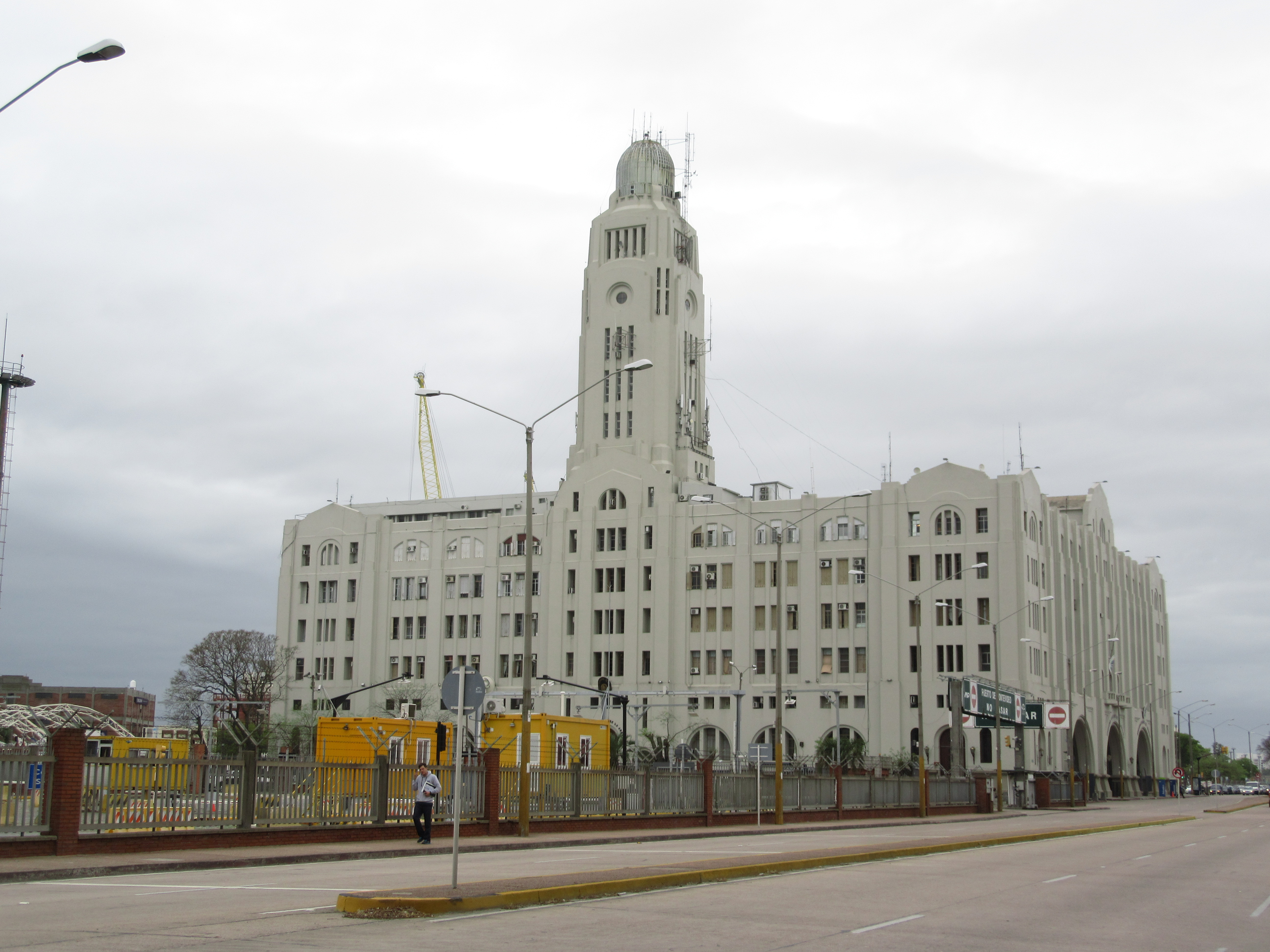
Dirección de Aduanas.

Jorge Herrán Sienra (Montevideo, 5 February 1897 – 19 June 1969) was a Uruguayan architect. He was part of a notable generation of architects which included, among others, Carlos Surraco, Alberto Muñoz del Campo, Juan Antonio Rius, Rodolfo Amargós, Guillermo Armas, Jorge Caprario, Rodolfo Vigouroux and José Pedro Sierra Morató.

== Selected works ==
- National Customs Directorate and Port Authority (Dirección de Aduanas y Capitanía General de Puertos) (1923), currently Navy General Command, at the Port of Montevideo; it is often associated with Eliel Saarinen's Helsinki Central Station; a National Monument since 1975.
- Mac Lean building (1930).
- Office building for Gervasio de Posadas Belgrano (1926), nowadays a bank.
- Yacht Club Uruguayo main building (1934–1939), together with Luis Crespi, a notable Art Deco building in its nautical variant.
