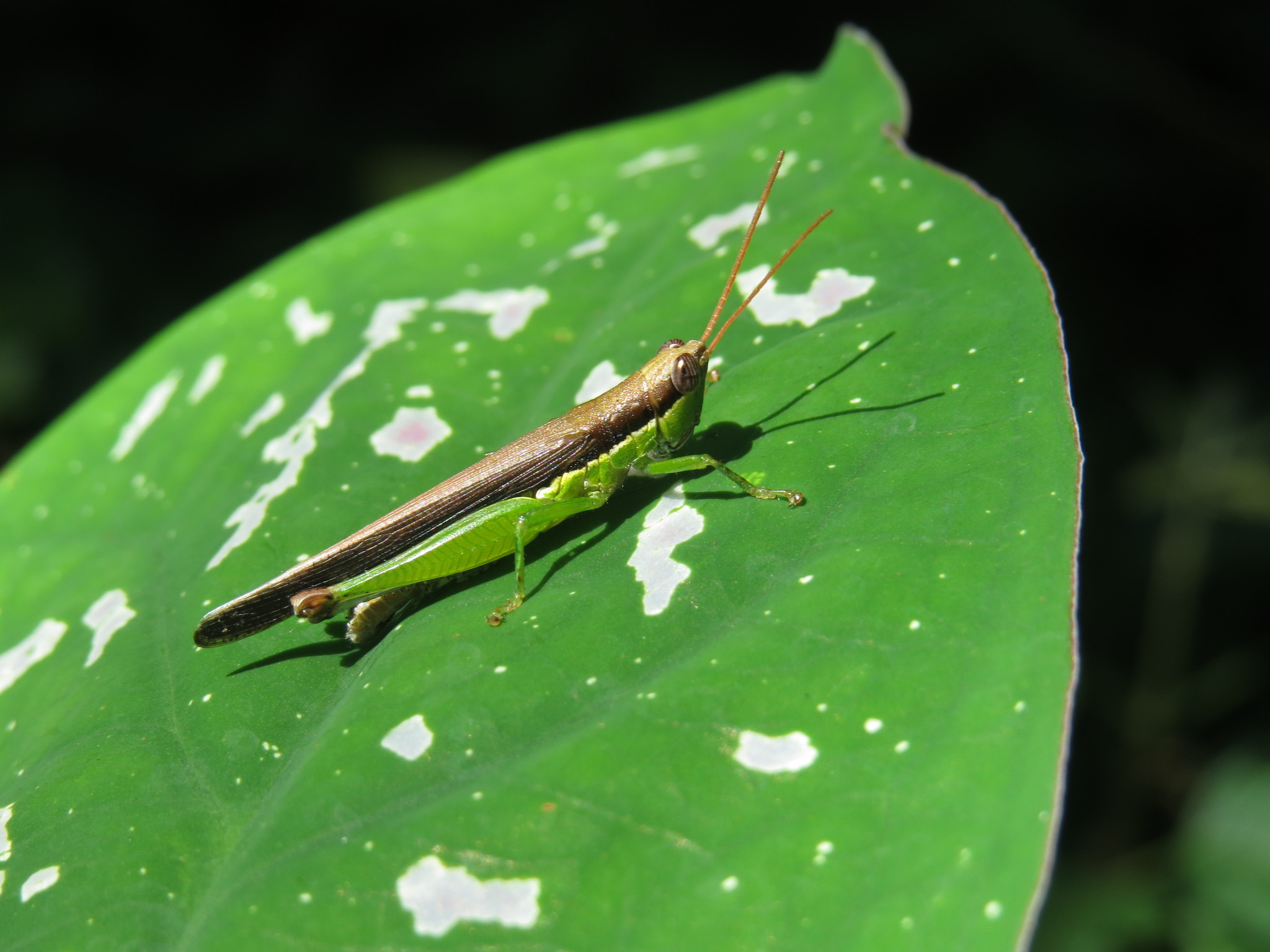
- Cornops, Brazil

Scientific classification
- Kingdom: Animalia
- Phylum: Arthropoda
- Clade: Pancrustacea
- Class: Insecta
- Order: Orthoptera
- Suborder: Caelifera
- Family: Acrididae
- Subfamily: Leptysminae
- Tribe: Tetrataeniini
- Genus: Cornops; Scudder, 1875

= Cornops =

Genus of insects

Cornops is a genus of spur-throat toothpick grasshoppers in the family Acrididae. There are about six described species in Cornops.

== Species ==
These six species belong to the genus Cornops:

- Cornops aquaticum (Bruner, 1906) (Mexico, Central America, and South America)
- Cornops brevipenne Roberts & Carbonell, 1979 (Bolivia, Brazil, Ecuador, and Peru)
- Cornops dorsatum (Bruner, 1911) (Brazil)
- Cornops frenatum (Marschall, 1836) (Central and South America)
- Cornops longipenne (De Geer, 1773) (northern South America)
- Cornops paraguayense (Bruner, 1906) (Central and South America)
