= Cornops aquaticum =

Scientific classification
- Kingdom: Animalia
- Phylum: Arthropoda
- Clade: Pancrustacea
- Class: Insecta
- Order: Orthoptera
- Suborder: Caelifera
- Family: Acrididae
- Subfamily: Leptysminae
- Tribe: Tetrataeniini
- Genus: Cornops
- Species: C. aquaticum

Binomial name
- Cornops aquaticum (Bruner, 1906)

Species of grasshopper

Cornops aquaticum is a semiaquatic species of grasshopper native to the Neotropics, from southern Mexico south to central Argentina and Uruguay. It feeds and breeds exclusively on members of the aquatic plant family Pontederiaceae, especially water hyacinth (Eichhornia crassipes), and is being investigated as a possible biological pest control agent for the water hyacinth in countries where that plant is invasive.

Although its semiaquatic behavior is unusual, it is not unique. In South America alone there are more than 50 species of orthopterans that are associated with water, including a few relatively well-known species like Paulinia acuminata, which is used for control of the plant Salvinia molesta.

== Appearance ==
Cornops aquaticum is a medium-sized grasshopper, with adults typically about 2.4–3.4 cm (0.94–1.34 in) in total length (head to wing tip); males average smaller than females. Adults are greenish with a distinct, broad black stripe on either side, running from the eye to the tip of the wing. During dry periods they become brown. The nymphs range from 0.6 to 3 cm (0.24–1.18 in), and are mottled in green-blue and orange-red.

== Ecology ==
Being semiaquatic and living on floating plants, both adults and nymphs of C. aquaticum are a strong swimmers and readily enter the water. They have been observed moving between aquatic plants as much as 1 m (3 ft 3 in) below the surface. If on land and seeing a predator like a bird, the grasshopper may attempt to crawl out of sight, jump or fly away, or dive into the water where it may stay submerged for an extended period of time. The adults are strong fliers and can move relatively long distances to access new regions with their preferred food plants.

Adults live for 55–110 days; after an initial feeding period of four weeks, females deposit up to seven egg packets at intervals. Each packet contains 30–70 eggs. The female inserts its ovipositor into the leaf stalk of the host plant to deposit the egg packet; the egg cases are large, measuring an average of 27 by 3 mm (1.1 by 0.1 in). The eggs hatch after 25–30 days, and the nymphs feed on the leaves of the plant for about seven weeks, passing through six or seven instars, and causing much damage. Feeding trials show that besides water hyacinth (Eichhornia crassipes), nymphs can complete their development on Eichhornia azurea and Pontederia cordata (pickerel weed), both also in the family Pontederiaceae, and on Canna indica. In laboratory starvation trials, nymphs can also feed on some other plants but the females do not oviposit on these species and the nymphs do not develop beyond the third instar on any of them. The adults also consume large amounts of foliage of their plant host. Damage caused to the plant is high compared to damage caused by other grasshoppers, but nevertheless, it is only able to limit the plant, as the growth exceeds the consumption by the insect.

== Biological control ==
The water hyacinth is an aquatic plant in the family Pontederiaceae whose natural enemies keep under control in its native South America. However this plant has been introduced into countries where it has insufficient natural enemies and where it has become invasive. Cornops aquaticum is under consideration as a biological control agent for this invasive plant, and has been introduced under controlled conditions into South Africa for this purpose. Before full release, the South African trials showed that, in the absence of E. crassipes, the adult insects would feed on maize (Zea mays) and sugarcane (Saccharum officinarum), but that only eggs laid on E crassipes were viable. Where the insects had a choice of diet, they invariably chose E. crassipes and were not found on the crop species.
