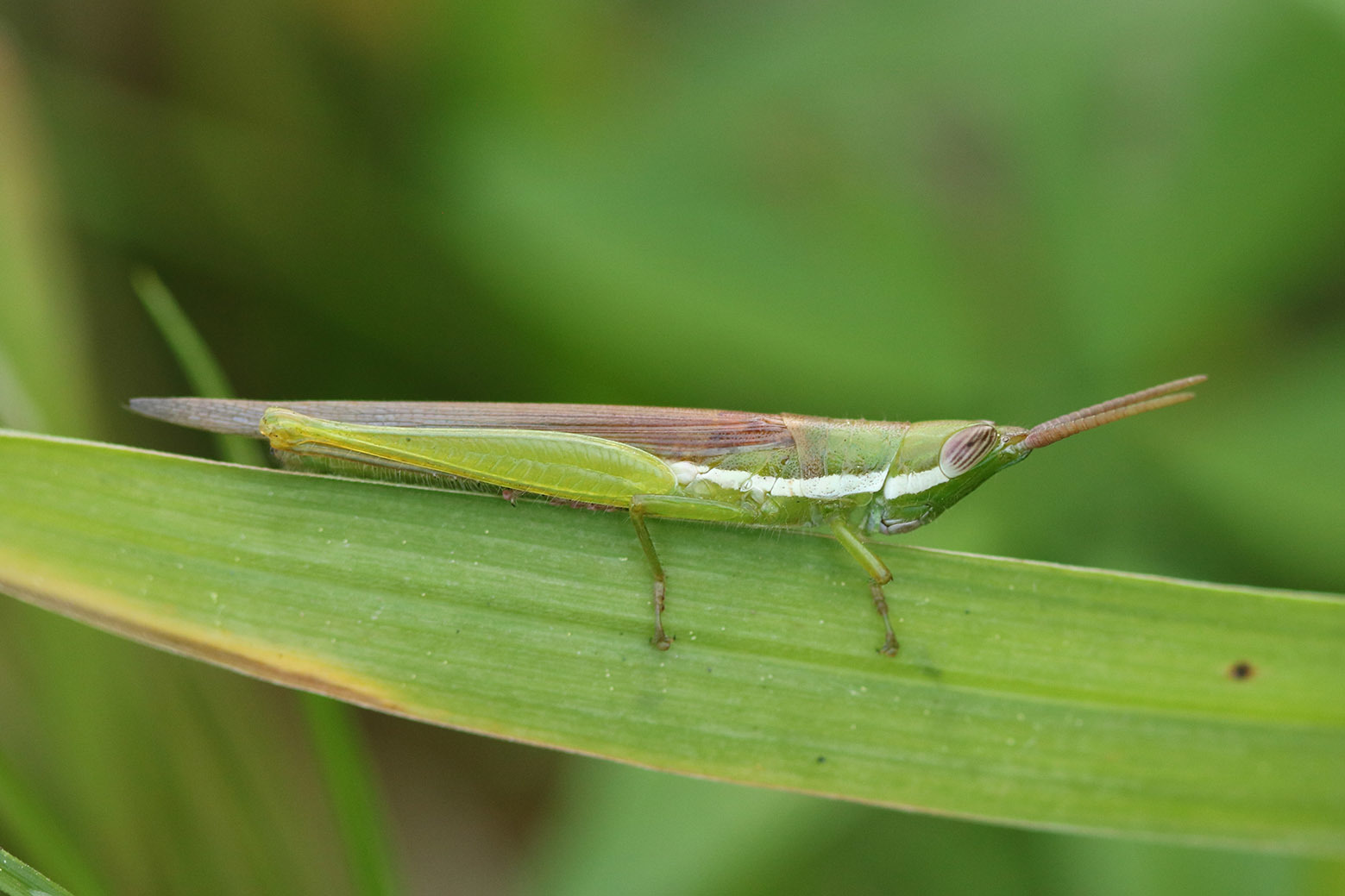
- Tucayaca gracilis, Argentina

Scientific classification
- Kingdom: Animalia
- Phylum: Arthropoda
- Clade: Pancrustacea
- Class: Insecta
- Order: Orthoptera
- Suborder: Caelifera
- Family: Acrididae
- Subfamily: Leptysminae
- Tribe: Leptysmini
- Genus: Tucayaca; Bruner, 1920

Type species
- Tucayaca aquatica Bruner, 1920

= Tucayaca =

Genus of grasshoppers

Tucayaca is a genus of spur-throat toothpick grasshoppers in the family Acrididae. There are about five described species in Tucayaca, found mainly in South America.

== Species ==
These five species belong to the genus Tucayaca:

- Tucayaca aquatica Bruner, 1920
- Tucayaca biserrata Roberts, 1977
- Tucayaca coeruleipes Roberts, 1977
- Tucayaca gracilis (Giglio-Tos, 1897)
- Tucayaca parvula Roberts, 1977
