= Hugo Villar =

Uruguayan physician and politician

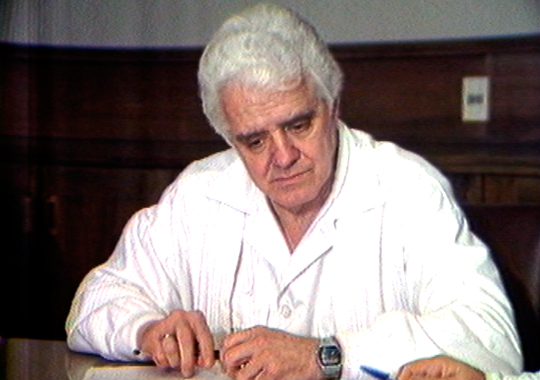
- Hugo Villar in 1988.
- Born: Hugo Villar Tejeiro; 20 November 1925; Montevideo, Uruguay
- Died: 15 April 2014 (aged 88)
- Education: University of the Republic
- Occupations: neurology, politician
- Political party: Broad Front

Hugo Villar Tejeiro (20 November 1925 – 15 April 2014) was a Uruguayan physician and politician. He is best known for co-founding the left-wing political party Broad Front in 1971. He was born in Montevideo.

Villar died on 15 April 2014 in Montevideo, aged 88.
