= National Museum of Natural History, Uruguay =

Natural history museum established in 1838

National Museum of Natural History
- Museo Nacional de Historia Natural
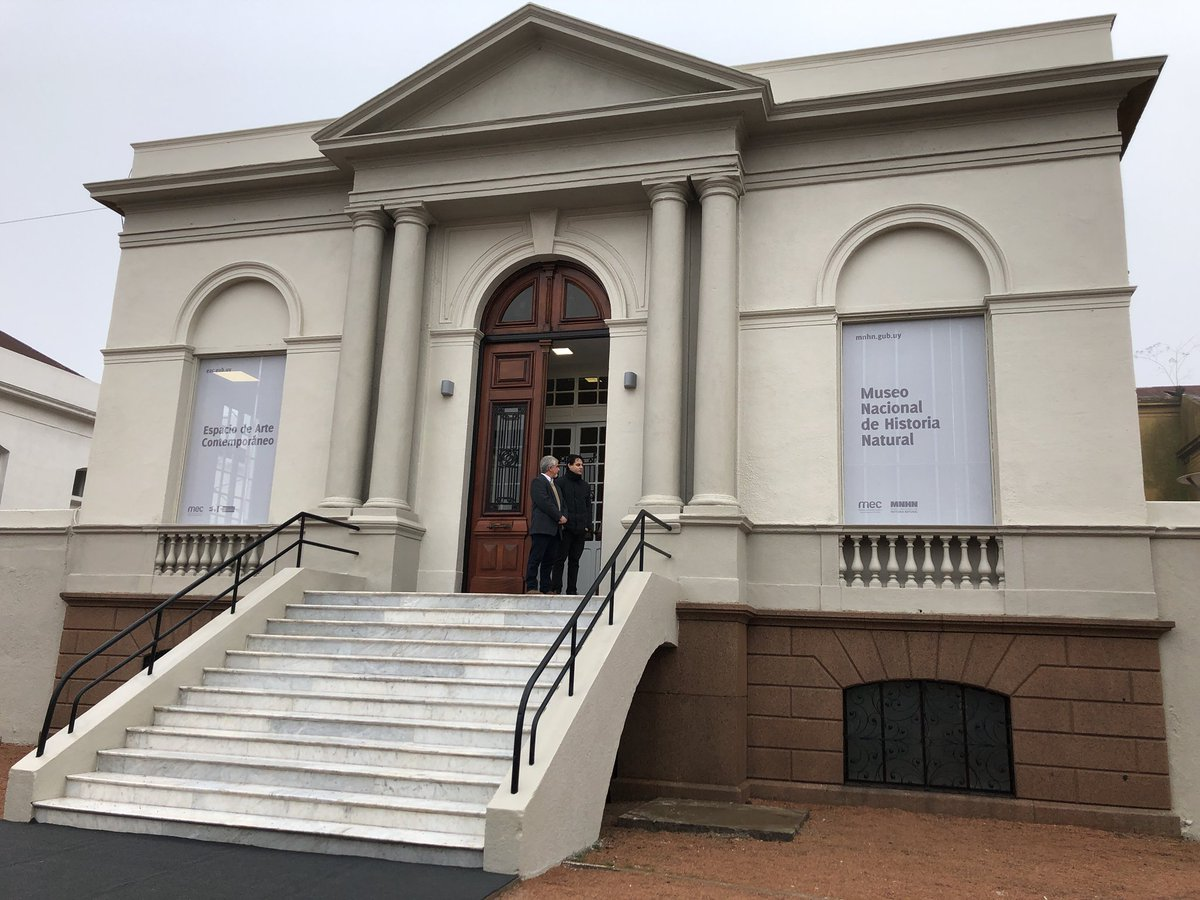
- Main entrance

- Location within Montevideo
- Established: 1838
- Location: Miguelete 1825, 11800 Montevideo, Uruguay
- Coordinates: 34.8945°S 56.1801°W
- Type: Natural history museum
- Director: Javier González
- Website: www.mnhn.gub.uy

The National Museum of Natural History (Spanish: Museo Nacional de Historia Natural or MNHN) in Montevideo is a natural history museum in Uruguay. It opened in 1838, and is the oldest scientific institution in Uruguay and one of the oldest natural history collections in the world. The museum's first permanent exhibition space is at Miguelete 1825—the former Miguelete Prison—and the scientific collections, library and administrative offices are at Calle 25 de Mayo 582 in the Old City.

== History ==
In September 1837 the Government of Uruguay established a commission to create a library and a national museum. Dámaso Antonio Larrañaga was appointed president of the commission, but the commission itself requested that Teodoro Vilardebó take over. The commission undertook an expedition that December to excavate a glyptodon fossil from the banks of the Pedernal River in Canelones Department, the results of which were published in 1838. The museum itself first opened on 18 July 1838 in what is now the Plaza Zabala. The museum, Uruguay's oldest scientific institution, predates the American Museum of Natural History (1871) and the Natural History Museum in London (1881).

In 1840, the poet Francisco Acuña de Figueroa was appointed director and for some years interest in the development of the museum waned, and it was not well regarded. Over time its holdings diminished and conflict between the museum board and central government led to management being taken back by the latter in 1870. The government introduced new regulations pertaining to the museum in 1875 which imposed new duties on the director to maintain and develop the museum's holdings, to classify them, and to report regularly on the museum's running. In 1879 the museum was moved to the west wing of the Solís Theatre, where it remained until the year 2000, having previously been housed at Calle Sarandí 472 from 1867 to 1878. In 1880, the National Library—the Biblioteca Nacional de Uruguay—and the National Museum were split.

The 1875 reforms having proven insufficient, in 1888 a new commission led by director Juan Mesa was established to reorganise the museum and its operation. This was followed in 1890 by another reorganisation commission under José Arechavaleta, with Carlos Berg as director. It was around this time that the National Museum started to split between the scientific half, which became the National Museum of Natural History, and the half devoted to the arts and humanities, which became the National History Museum and the National Museum of Visual Arts. This separation was made official in 1911 and the current title of the National Museum of Natural History first appears in law in 1913. When Berg resigned in 1892, Arechavaleta was appointed director and continued in that position until his death in 1912.

In 1915, the museum acquired Arechavaleta's herbarium of 7,000 specimens and private library of 1,500 books. The herbarium is a significant part of the museum's holdings today.

The space in the Solís Theatre was already considered unsuitable by 1902, but the museum continued there until 2000 when, during the theatre's six-year renovation, it was forced to move temporarily into the former Barreiro y Ramos bookstore and then, in 2006, into a former auction house. While the MNHN had previously been able to give exhibitions from its base in the theatre, it had not had any permanent exhibitions, and for years after vacating it was not open to the public at all, though the collections remained open to researchers.

In July 2018 the museum opened its first permanent exhibition space in the grounds of a former prison, the Cárcel de Miguelete, which it shares with the Contemporary Art Space (Espacio de Arte Contemporáneo or EAC), also sponsored by the museum. The prison was in active use from 1888 to 1986, ceasing all operations in 1998, and is the oldest panopticon prison surviving in Latin America in its original form. The EAC took over the central block of the prison (from which the five wings could be observed) in 2010, before being officially inaugurated in 2018 at the same time as the MNHN exhibition space. The new MNHN was opened by Minister of Education and Culture María Julia Muñoz in a ceremony to mark the museum's 180th anniversary. The move to the former prison grounds had originally been planned in 2004 but fell apart due to lack of funding. Several other plans were made subsequently before the final decision was taken. The museum's full collection and library were expected to move into the new accommodation later.

== Collections and operation ==
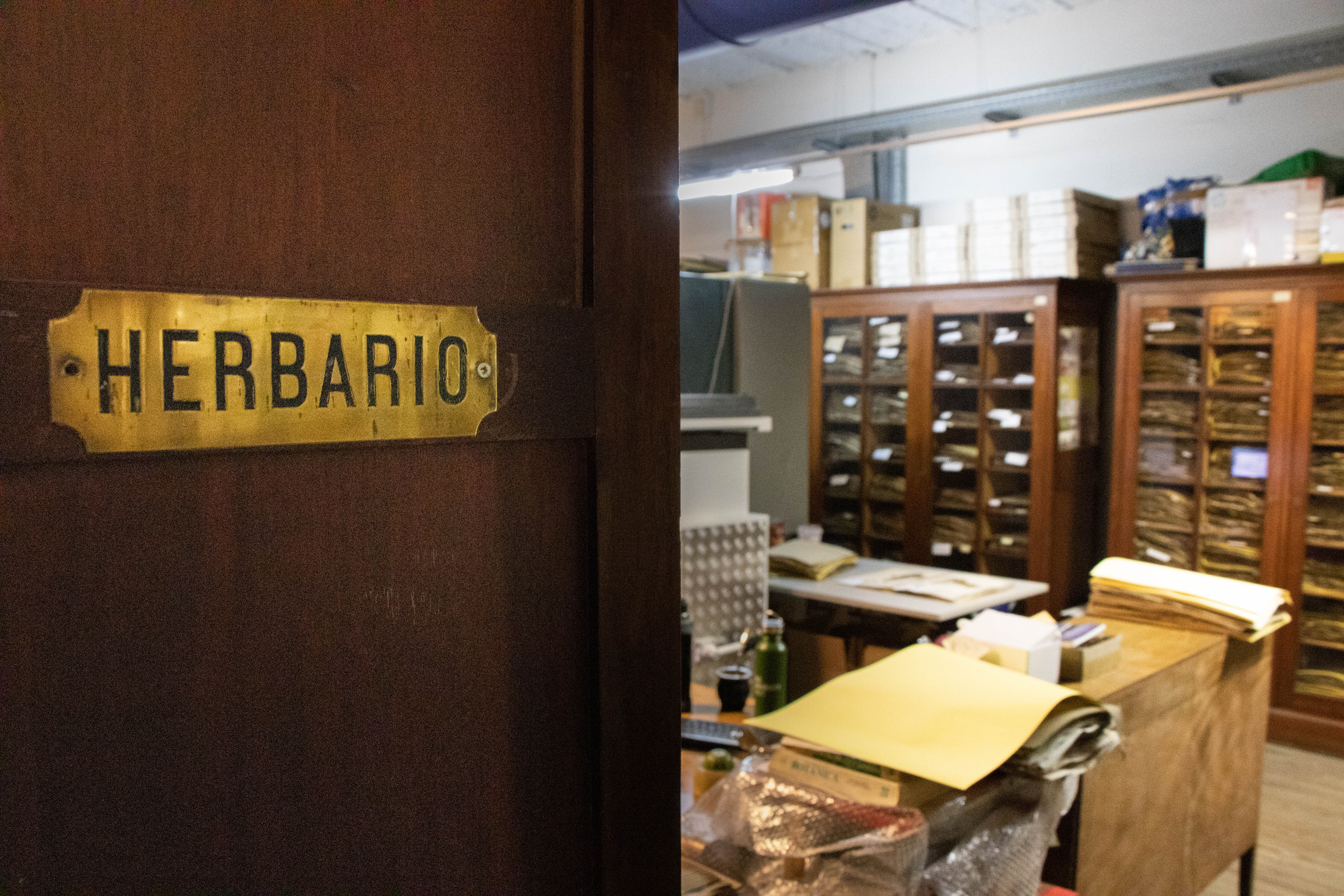
Entrance to the herbarium office

The botanical collection at the museum totals around 80,000 specimens. The museum also has thousands of mammals, birds, fish, molluscs, arachnids and others, and the museum itself (separate and apart from the National Library) holds over 250,000 volumes.

The first two exhibitions opened when the museum moved to the former Miguelete Prison were on prehistoric life in what is now Uruguay, and the present-day ecology of Uruguay.

In 2008, a skull held at the museum since the 1980s was designated the holotype of a new species of rodent, named Josephoartigasia monesi in honour of former director of the museum, paleontologist Álvaro Mones, in recognition of his work on prehistoric rodents (the genus Josephoartigasia is named for Uruguayan national hero José Gervasio Artigas). Josephoartigasia monesi is the largest known species of rodent, estimated to have weighed up to 1,000 kg. It lived between 2 and 4 million years ago.

The Annals of the museum were first published in 1894 under Arechavaleta. The museum has also published its Botanical Communications since 1942, Zoological Communications since 1943, Anthropological Communications since 1956 and Paleontological Communications since 1970. The Extra Publications have been published occasionally since 1933. Between 1973 and 1985 the museum also published the Bulletin of the National Museum of Natural History free of charge for schools.

== Directors ==
The following have served as director of the museum:

- Dámaso Antonio Larrañaga (1837) (original president of the commission to form the museum)
- Teodoro Vilardebó (1837–1840) (replacing Larrañaga in the same position)
- Francisco Acuña de Figueroa (1840–?)
- Mariano Augusto Fabián Ferreira (1868–?)
- Juan Mesa (1888–1890)
- Carlos Berg (1890–1892)
- José Arechavaleta (1892–1912)
- Garibaldi José Devincenzi (1912–1942)
- Ergasto H Cordero (1942–1951)
- Diego Legrand (1951–1970)
- Miguel Ángel Klappenbach (1970–1984)
- Héctor S. Osorio (1984–1998)
- Álvaro Mones (1998–2004)
- Arturo Toscano (2004–2009)
- Víctor Scarabino (2009–2013)
- Javier Alfredo González García (2013–present)

== See also ==
- Dr Carlos A. Torres de la Llosa Natural History Museum, another prominent natural history museum in Montevideo
- Lucrecia Covelo, associate curator and entomologist.
- Uruguay Sub200
