= Jorge Caprario =

Uruguayan architect

Jorge Caprario Pittaluga (Montevideo, 11 November 1896 - 29 March 1998) was a Uruguayan architect. He was part of a notable generation of architects which included, among others, Carlos Surraco, Alberto Muñoz del Campo, Juan Antonio Rius, Rodolfo Amargós, Guillermo Armas, Jorge Herrán, Rodolfo Vigouroux and José Pedro Sierra Morató.

== Selected works ==
- Pochintesta home (1935)
- David Larghi home (1939)
- Caprario home (1940)
- Las Mariposas building (1942)
- El Indio building (1945–1949)
- Assimakos carpet factory (1949)

== Bibliography ==
- Carmona, Liliana (2015). "El arte de humanarse: doctrina del arquitecto Jorge Caprario" (PDF). Vitruvia. Revista del IHA. 2 (2). UdelaR, FADU: 141–153.
