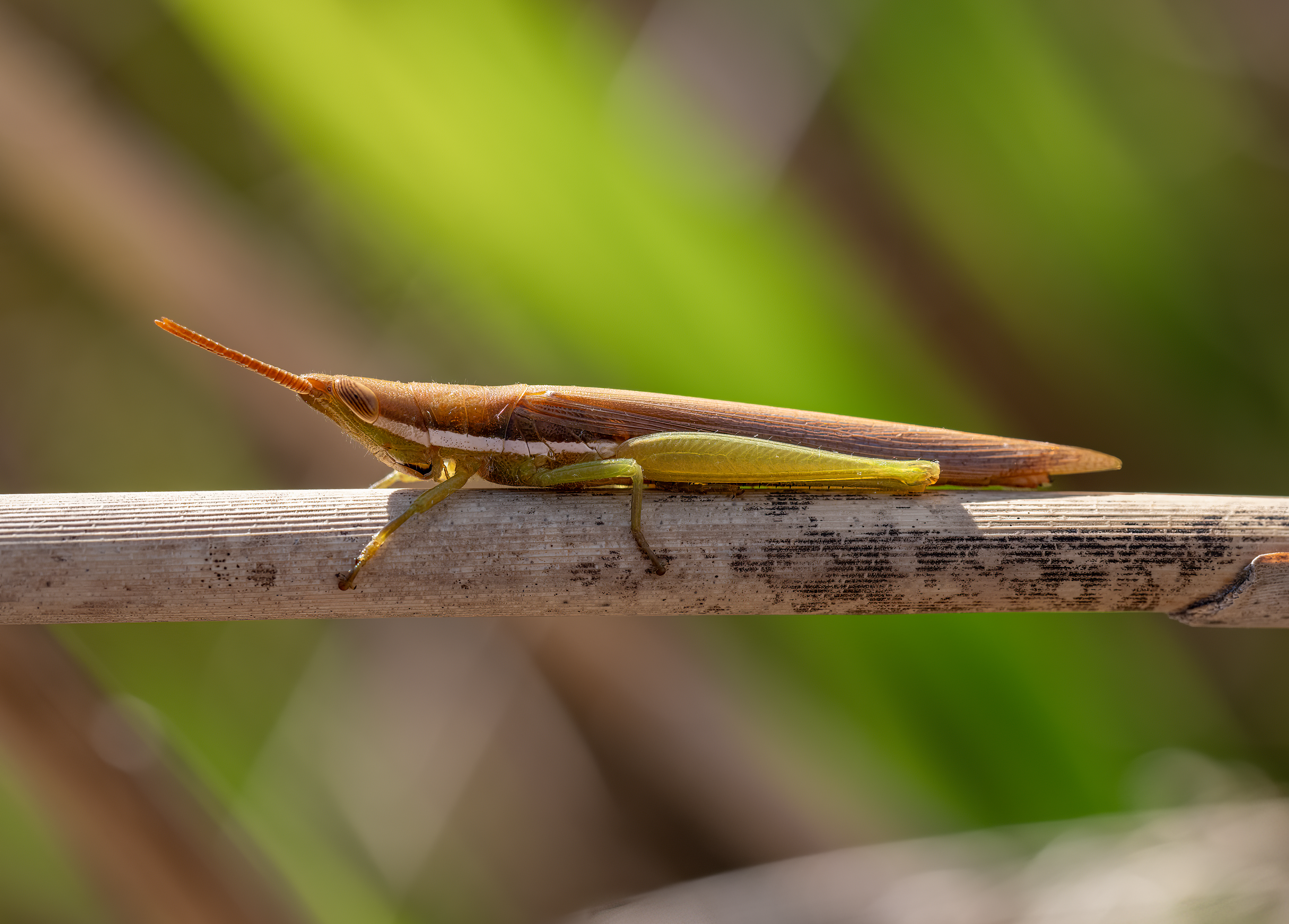
- Cattail toothpick grasshopper in Delaware, USA

Scientific classification
- Kingdom: Animalia
- Phylum: Arthropoda
- Clade: Pancrustacea
- Class: Insecta
- Order: Orthoptera
- Suborder: Caelifera
- Family: Acrididae
- Genus: Leptysma
- Species: L. marginicollis

Binomial name
- Leptysma marginicollis (Serville, 1838)

= Leptysma marginicollis =

Species of grasshopper

Leptysma marginicollis, the cattail toothpick grasshopper or slender locust, is a species of grasshopper. It has a very pointed head and flattened, sword-shaped antennae. Thus, it superficially resembles grasshoppers in the subfamily Gomphocerinae, but is easily distinguished by the presence of a spur, or spine, between the front legs. They are usually brownish with a white, yellow, or brown stripe from the eye to the base of the front legs. The head is as long as, or longer than, the prothorax. On top, the body may also be red or pink. The front wings are sharply pointed, extending 3-5mm beyond the tip of the abdomen.

== Distribution and habitat ==
This species is found throughout the U.S., Mexico, in the neotropics, and the Caribbean. It inhabits wet areas, and is usually found on emergent vegetation such as cattails and sedges.

== Behavior ==
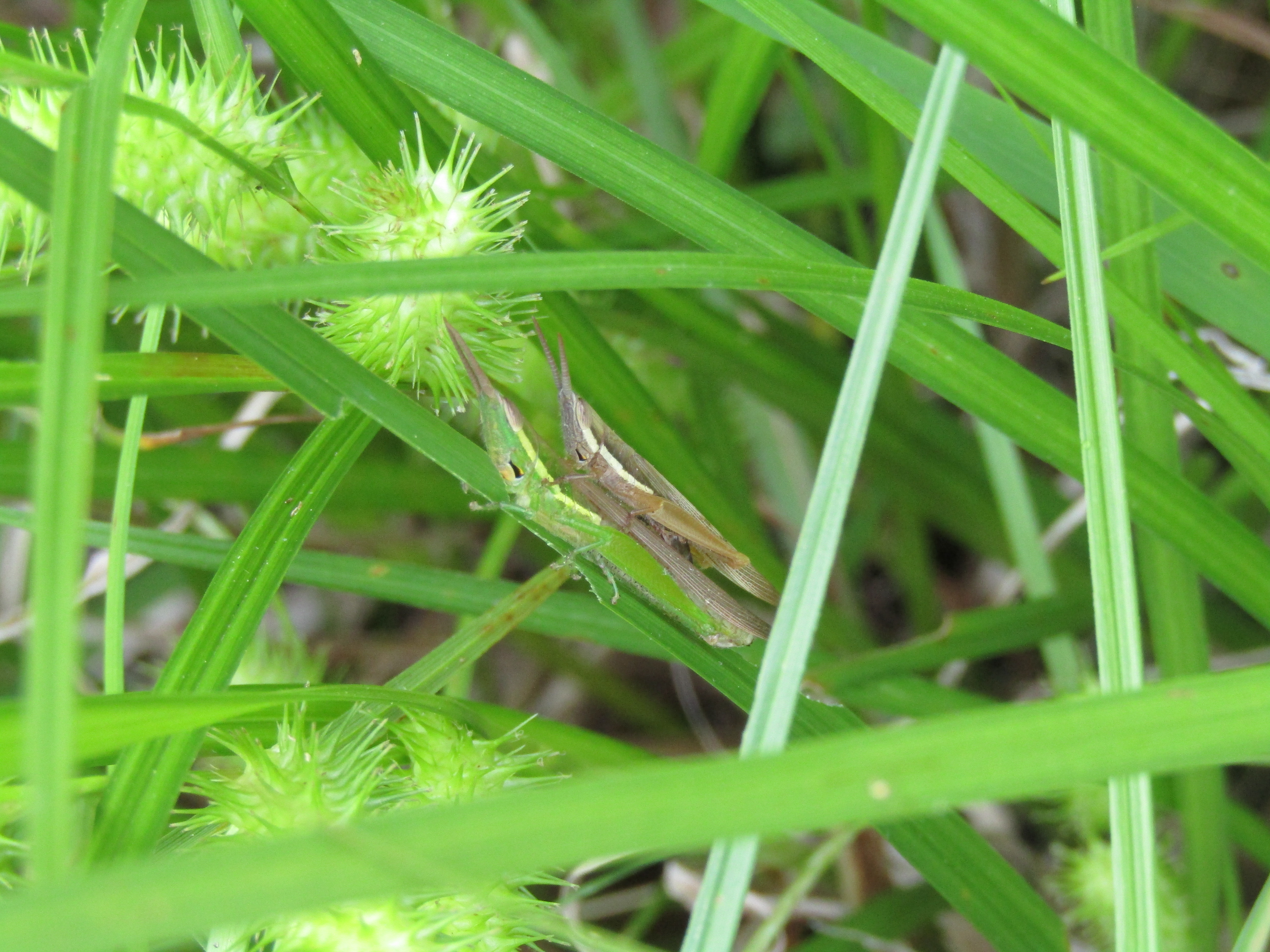
Mating pair

The mating season for Leptysma marginicollis begins around April, after which eggs are laid inside the stem of a plant.
