= Luis Crespi =

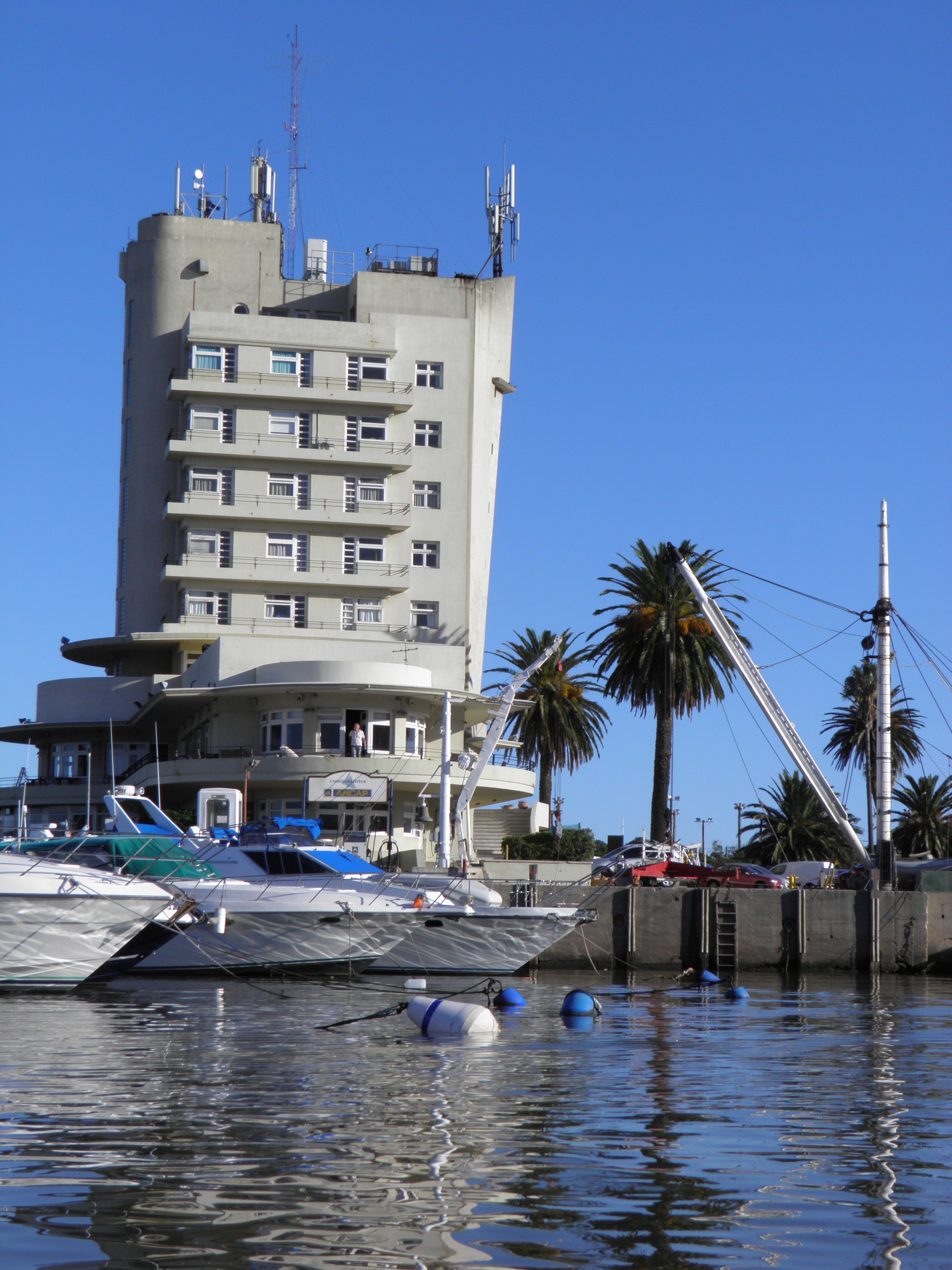
Yacht Club building in 2011.

Luis Crespi (Montevideo, 29 January 1904 – 1969) was a Uruguayan architect.

== Selected works ==
- n/d: Third Church of Christ, Scientist
- 1934–1939: Yacht Club Uruguayo building (with Jorge Herrán)
- 1937–1947: National Library of Uruguay building
- 1938: Crespi Home
- 1946–1949: Parque Lecocq layout (with Mario Payssé Reyes)
- 1950 (approx.): Central Cemetery of Montevideo layout

== Bibliography ==
- Artucio, Leopoldo. "Montevideo y la arquitectura moderna, N° 5, Nuestra Tierra, Montevideo, 1971" (PDF) (in Spanish). Archived from the original (pdf) on 2013-09-27.
