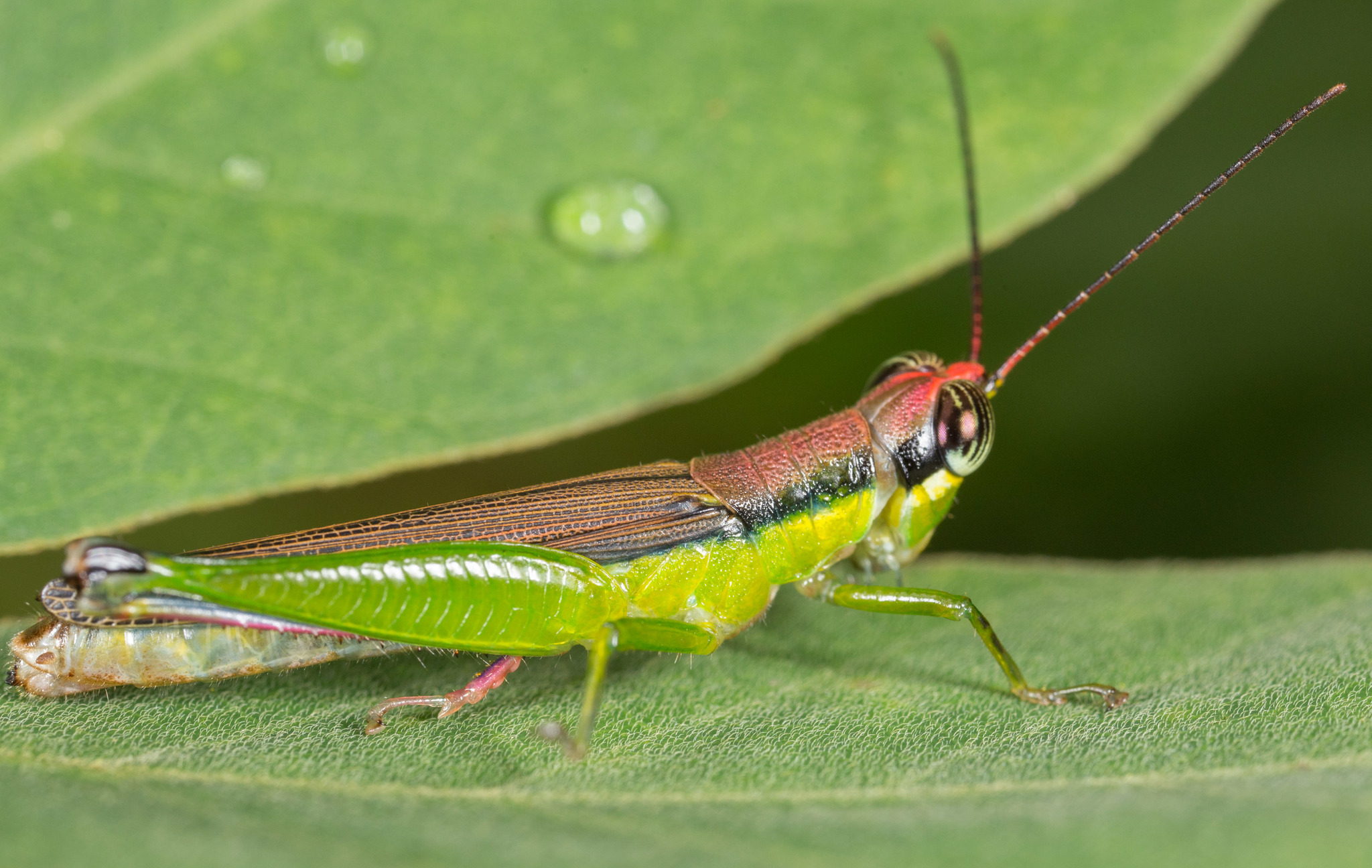
- Stenopola puncticeps, Ecuador

Scientific classification
- Kingdom: Animalia
- Phylum: Arthropoda
- Clade: Pancrustacea
- Class: Insecta
- Order: Orthoptera
- Suborder: Caelifera
- Family: Acrididae
- Subfamily: Leptysminae
- Tribe: Tetrataeniini
- Genus: Stenopola; Stål, 1873

= Stenopola =

Genus of grasshoppers

Stenopola is a genus of spur-throat toothpick grasshoppers in the family Acrididae. There are about 13 described species in Stenopola, found in the Americas.

== Species ==
These species belong to the genus Stenopola:

- Stenopola bicoloripes (Descamps & Amédégnato, 1972)
- Stenopola bohlsii Giglio-Tos, 1895
- Stenopola boliviana (Rehn, 1913)
- Stenopola caatingae Roberts & Carbonell, 1979
- Stenopola dorsalis (Thunberg, 1827)
- Stenopola flava Roberts & Carbonell, 1979
- Stenopola nigricans Roberts & Carbonell, 1979
- Stenopola pallida (Bruner, 1906)
- Stenopola puncticeps (Stål, 1861)
- Stenopola rubrifrons Roberts & Carbonell, 1979
- Stenopola tigris Roberts & Carbonell, 1979
- Stenopola viridis Roberts, 1980
- Stenopola vorax (Saussure, 1861)
