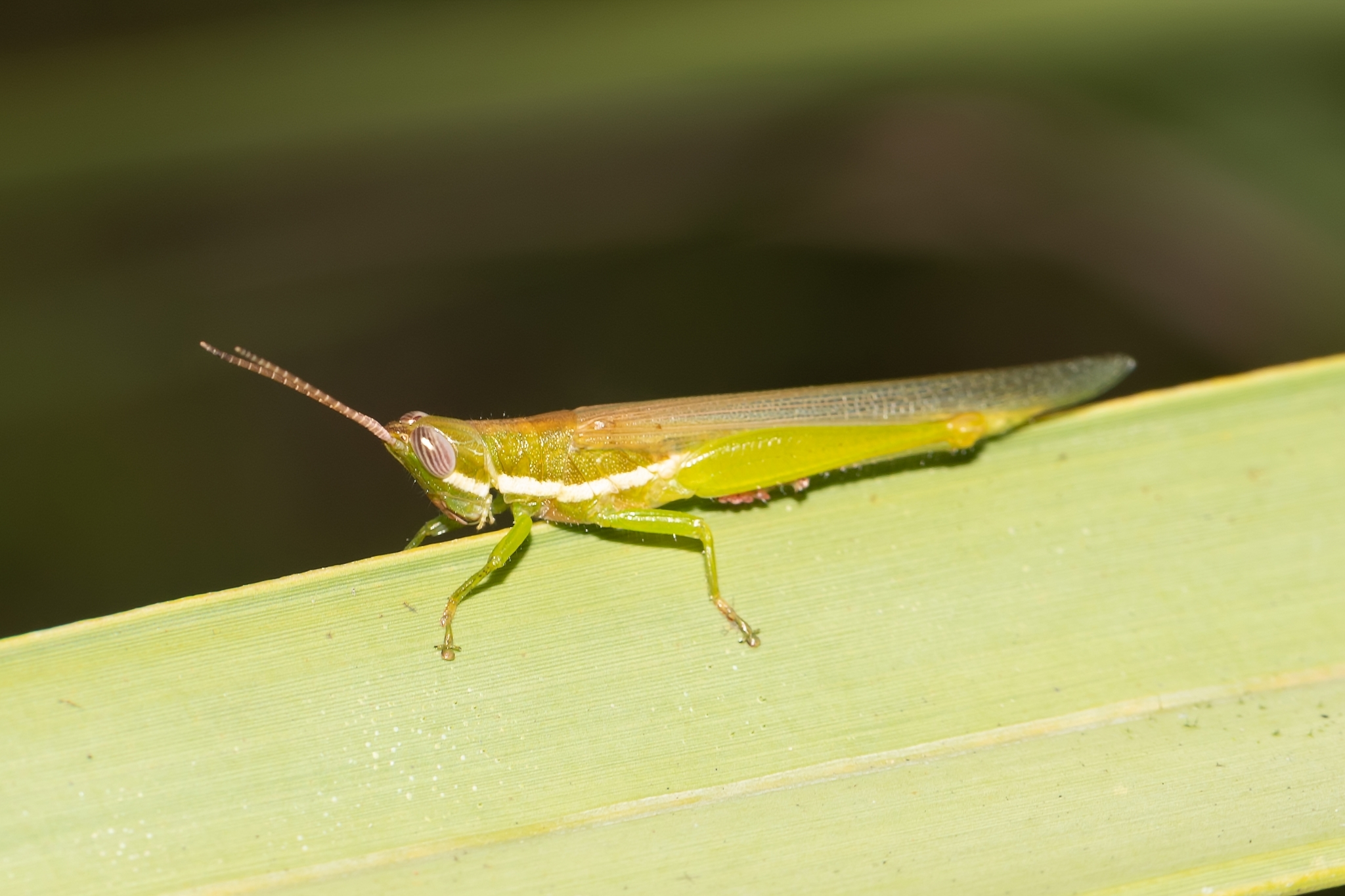
- Stenacris vitreipennis, Florida

Scientific classification
- Kingdom: Animalia
- Phylum: Arthropoda
- Clade: Pancrustacea
- Class: Insecta
- Order: Orthoptera
- Suborder: Caelifera
- Family: Acrididae
- Subfamily: Leptysminae
- Tribe: Leptysmini; Brunner von Wattenwyl, 1893

= Leptysmini =

Tribe of grasshoppers

Leptysmini is a tribe of spur-throat toothpick grasshoppers in the family Acrididae. There are about 9 genera and more than 30 described species in Leptysmini, found in North, Central, and South America.

== Genera ==
These nine genera belong to the tribe Leptysmini:

- Belosacris Rehn & Eades, 1961
- Carbonellacris Roberts, 1977
- Columbacris Bruner, 1911
- Cylindrotettix Bruner, 1906
- Leptysma Stål, 1873
- Leptysmina Giglio-Tos, 1894
- Seabratettix Roberts, 1980
- Stenacris Walker, 1870
- Tucayaca Bruner, 1920
