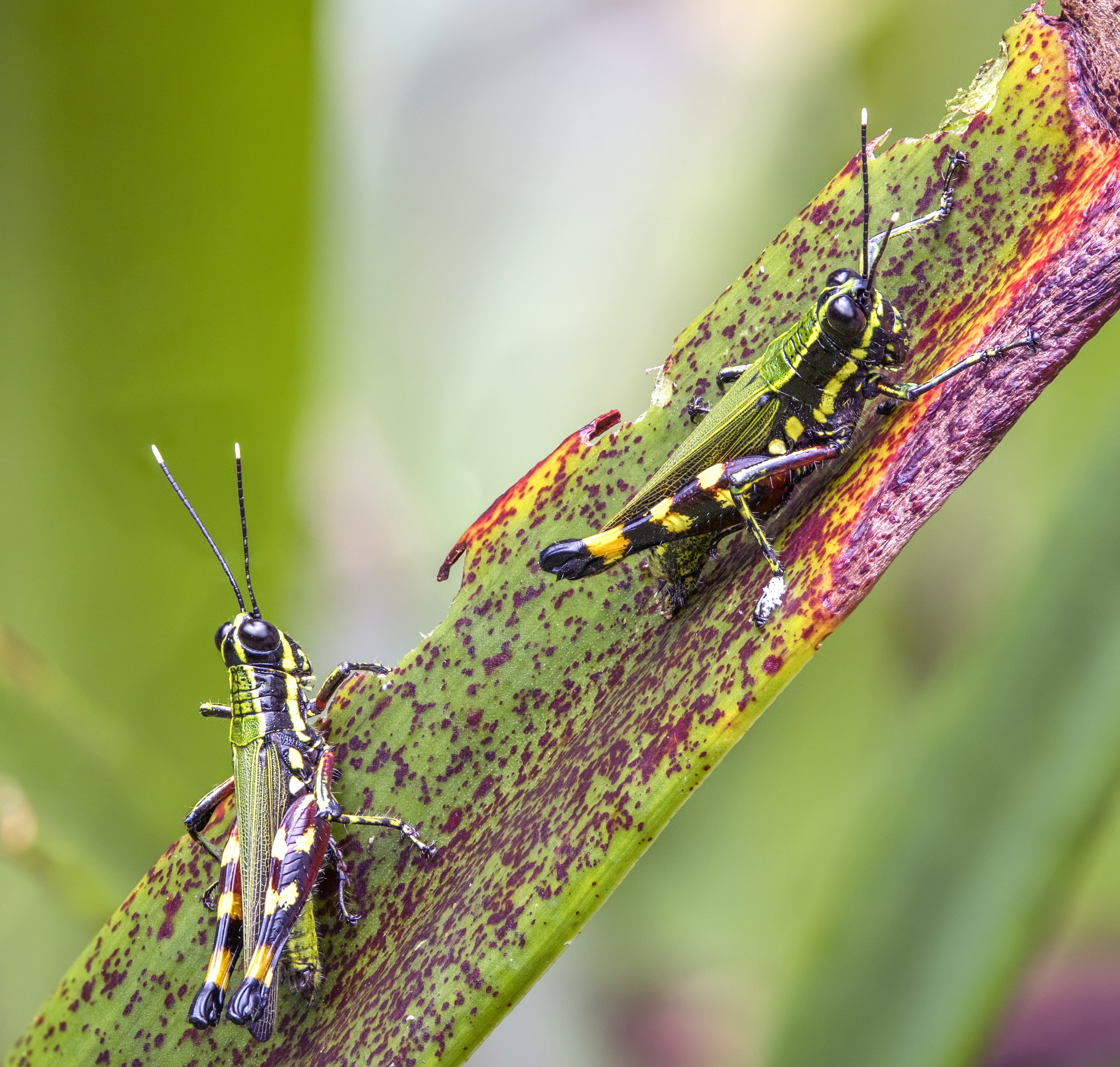
- Tetrataenia surinama, Ecuador

Scientific classification
- Kingdom: Animalia
- Phylum: Arthropoda
- Clade: Pancrustacea
- Class: Insecta
- Order: Orthoptera
- Suborder: Caelifera
- Family: Acrididae
- Subfamily: Leptysminae
- Tribe: Tetrataeniini
- Genus: Tetrataenia; Stål, 1873

= Tetrataenia =

Genus of grasshoppers

Tetrataenia is a genus of spur-throat toothpick grasshoppers in the family Acrididae. There are at least two described species in Tetrataenia, found in South America.

== Species ==
These species belong to the genus Tetrataenia:

- Tetrataenia surinama (Linnaeus, 1764)
- Tetrataenia virgata (Gerstaecker, 1889)
