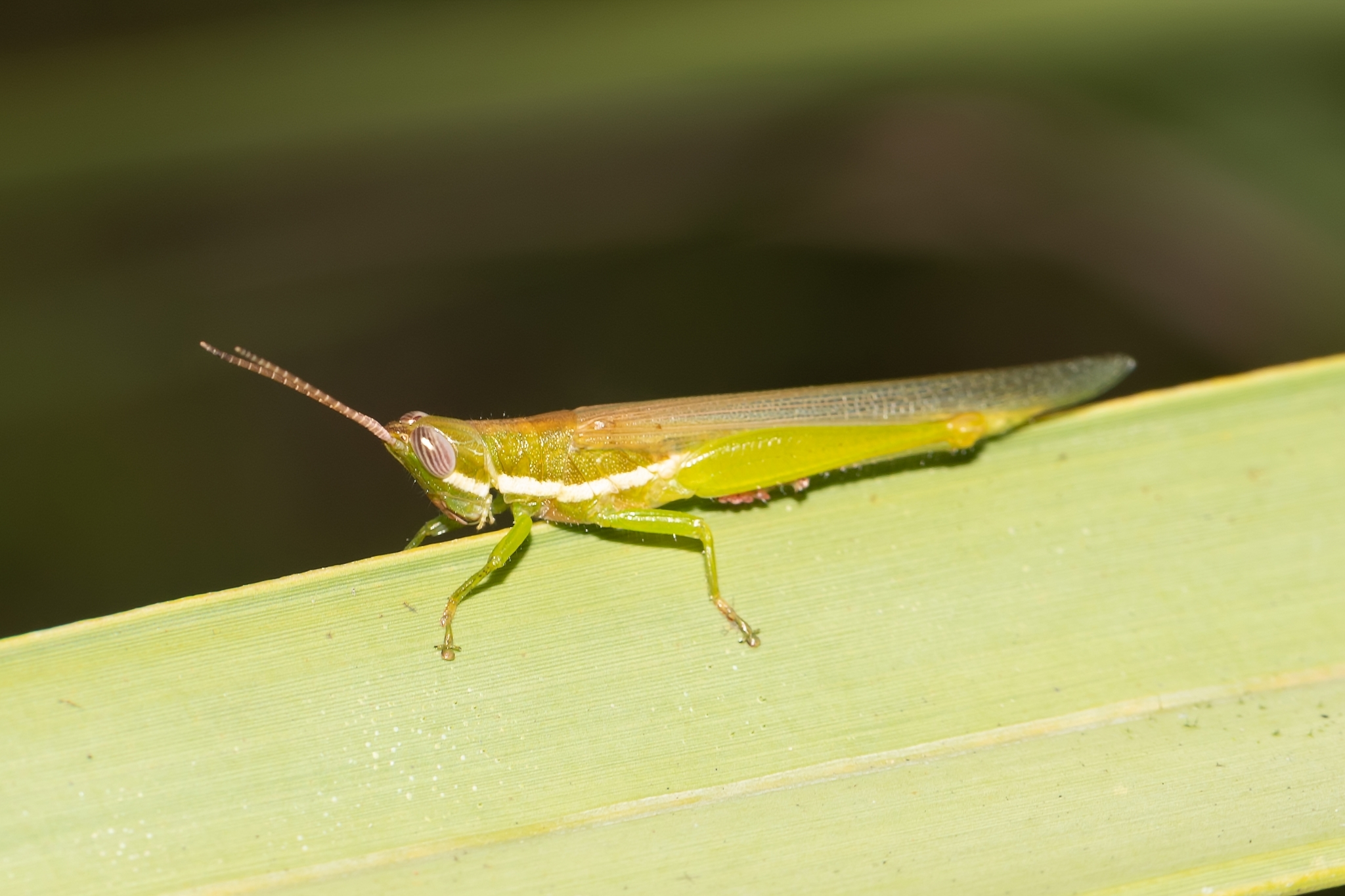
- Stenacris vitreipennis

Scientific classification
- Kingdom: Animalia
- Phylum: Arthropoda
- Clade: Pancrustacea
- Class: Insecta
- Order: Orthoptera
- Suborder: Caelifera
- Family: Acrididae
- Subfamily: Leptysminae
- Genus: Stenacris; Walker, 1870

= Stenacris =

Genus of grasshoppers

Stenacris is a genus of spur-throat toothpick grasshoppers in the family Acrididae. There are about six described species in Stenacris.

== Species ==
These six species belong to the genus Stenacris:

- Stenacris caribea (Rehn & Hebard, 1938)
- Stenacris fissicauda (Bruner, 1908)
- Stenacris megacephala Bruner, 1920
- Stenacris minor (Bruner, 1906)
- Stenacris vitreipennis (Marschall, 1836) (glassy-winged toothpick grasshopper)
- Stenacris xanthochlora (Marschall, 1836)
