= Biblioteca Nacional de Uruguay =

National library of Uruguay

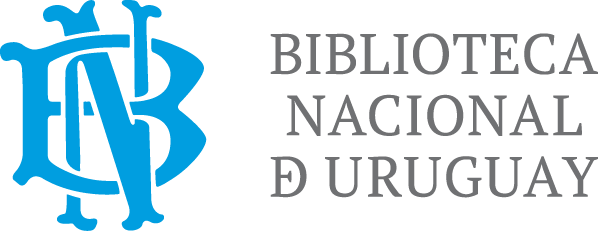

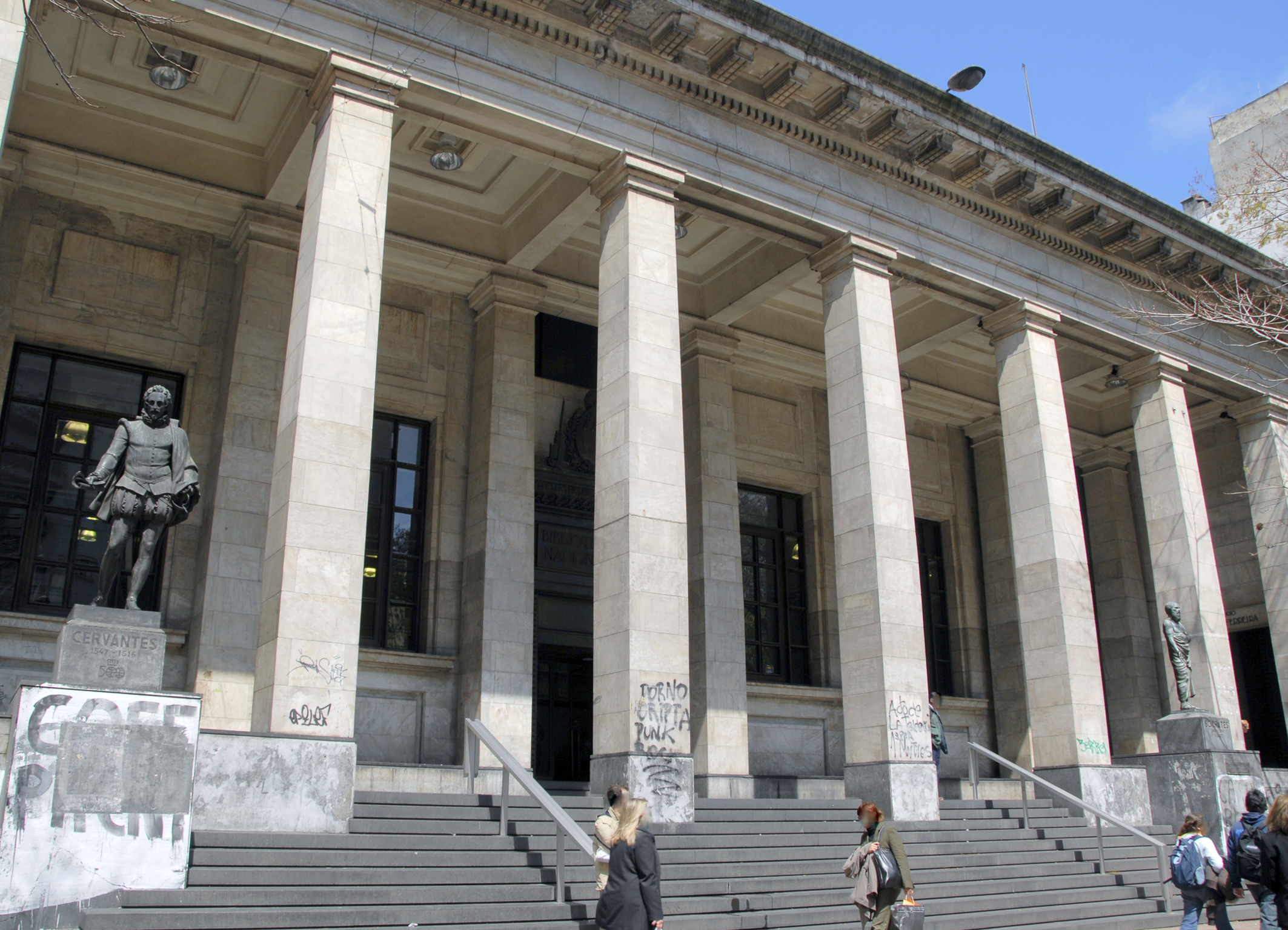
- 34.902665°S 56.177513°W
- Location: Av. 18 de Julio 1790, 11200 Montevideo, Departamento de Montevideo, Uruguay
- Type: National library
- Established: May 26, 1816; 209 years ago
- Architect: Luis Crespi

Other information
- Director: Valentín Trujillo

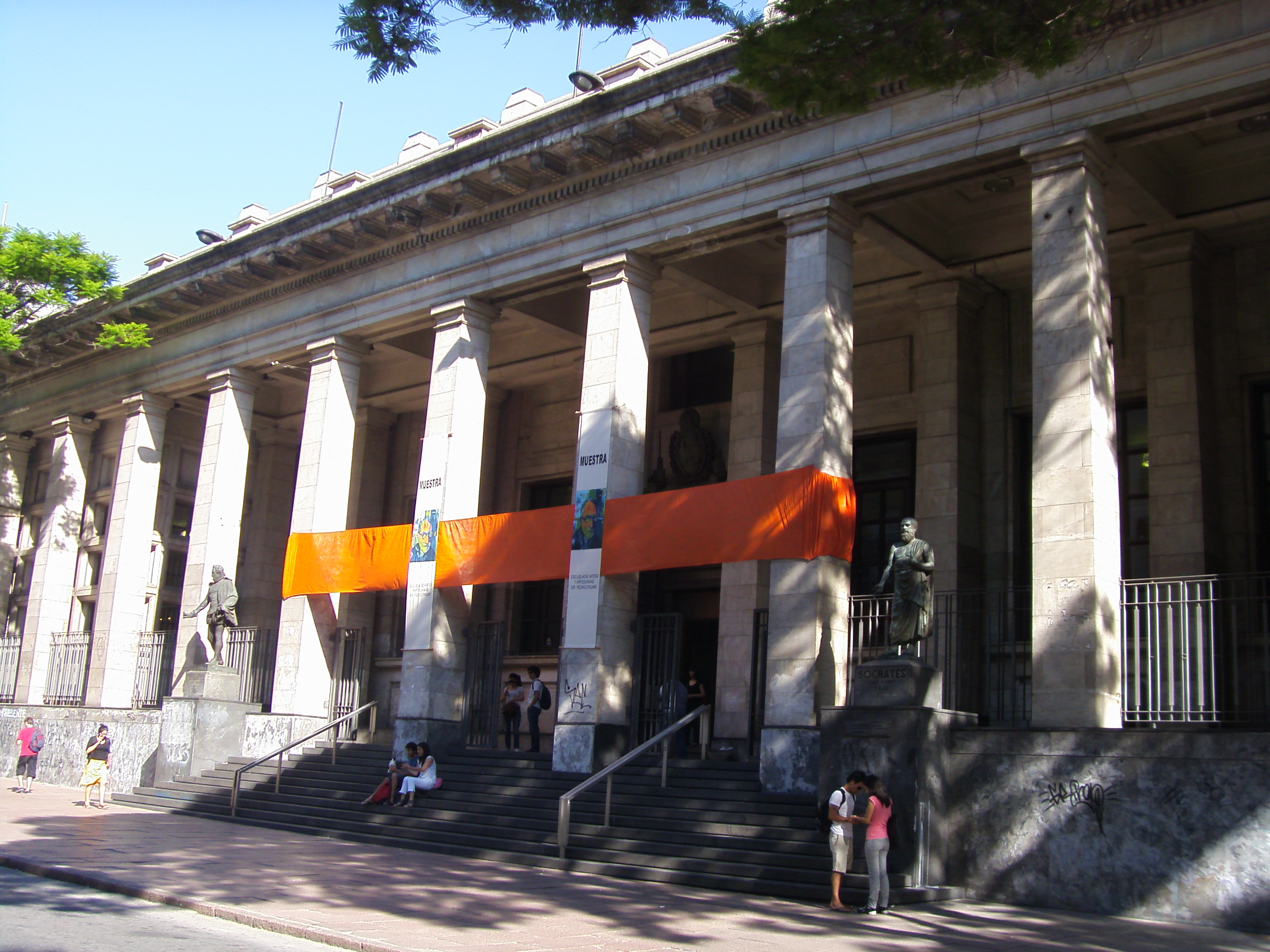
Front of the National Library of Uruguay

The Biblioteca Nacional de Uruguay is the National Library of Uruguay, located in Montevideo. It was created in 1815 and is the legal deposit and copyright library for Uruguay. It has been located in its current building since 1955 (architect: Luis Crespi). As of 2006, it housed more than 900,000 books, and 20,000 periodicals, audiovisual materials, maps, scores, engravings, watercolors, photographs and manuscripts.

== Reading rooms ==
- Central Reading Room General Joseph G. Artigas: A room where readers have access to books, brochures and publications domestic and foreign periodicals.
- Daily Reading Room: In this room the patrons have access to the press and foreign current and retrospective. To ensure the preservation of this valuable and often unique material, its loan is limited to established standards.

== Special rooms ==
- Uruguay Room: Keeps all books and pamphlets printed in the country, whether or not Uruguayan they are authors and works of local authors published abroad and work on Uruguay are published abroad. In order to preserve this important body of literature, in the year 1978 was assigned a separate area includes a comfortable reading room in which it will provide better service to scholars and national and foreign researchers. Uruguay Room has a catalog which records chronologically by year of publication, all the books and pamphlets that enter the library.
- Special Materials Room: This room houses the most valuable works held by the institution: rare and unique copies (incunabula, large volumes of antiquity, illuminated books, etc.). The library collection includes materials from history books, art, travel accounts, and so on. Museum preserves this room first American editions, editions of 16th century and historical manuscripts. They are also unique examples of domestic and foreign handouts, first newspapers in the country, such as The Southern Star (1807). In addition to the bibliography, this sector has a map collection: drawings, watercolors, photographs, postcards, sheet music, medals, coins and audiovisual material. For its inestimable value, it is a collection of unique material in our environment-the loan is restricted to researchers and scholars.

Newspaper: Keeps all sorts of magazines of Uruguay.

== Showrooms ==
- Francisco Acuña de Figueroa room: A room for conferences and events.
- José Pedro Varela Room: This room is used for exhibitions or events.
- Living Japan: This room houses the computer center of the National Library, a scanner for drawings and other images up to A3 size and the necessary equipment for recording CD and DVD.

== See also ==
- National Museum of Natural History, Uruguay
