= César Loustau =

Uruguayan architect and architectural historian

César Juan Loustau Infantozzi
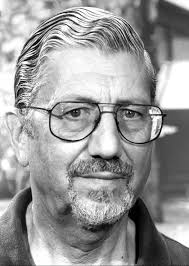
- César Loustau

Personal details
- Born: February 5, 1926 Uruguay
- Died: February 4, 2011 (aged 84) Uruguay
- Spouse: Ethnie Bottrill
- Children: Marcel Jean, Dominique Henriette, Ghislaine Marianne

César Juan Loustau Infantozzi, usually known as César J. Loustau (5 February 1926 – 4 February 2011) was a Uruguayan architect and architectural historian.

== Biography ==
Loustau graduated from the Faculty of Architecture at the University of the Republic, Uruguay. His work includes the renovation and expansion of the Elbio Fernandez School and Lyceum. He carried out an important histographic work, specially dedicated to the history of architecture in Uruguay. He was a fellow of the Institute of History and Geography of Uruguay., and contributed to the pages of the Sunday Supplement of the newspaper El Día, following his work in the pages of El País.

He was a full member of the Instituto Histórico y Geográfico del Uruguay.

== Publications ==
- "Italy's influence in Uruguayan architecture" ("La influencia de Italia en la arquitectura uruguaya"). The Italian Institute of Culture in Uruguay, 1990 pp. 95.
- "The life and work of Julio Vilamajó" ("Vida y obra de Julio Vilamajó"). Editorial Dos Puntos, 1994 pp. 109.
- Influence of France in Uruguayan architecture. Ediciones Trilce. 1995-01-01. p. 191. ISBN 9974-32-116-6..
- "Uruguay: The Iberian heritage in architecture and urban planning" ("Uruguay: la herencia ibérica en arquitectura y urbanismo"). Together with Architect Fernando Chebataroff. Ediciones de la Plaza, 2003 pp. 483.
- "Uruguayan Architecture of the 20th Century in Uruguay" ("La arquitectura uruguaya del siglo XX en el Uruguay") two volumes, 2010.

== Family ==
Loustau was married to Ethnie Bottrill, with whom he had three children: Marcel Jean, Dominique Henriette and Ghislaine Marianne.
