= University of the Republic (Uruguay) =

Uruguayan public university

- Universidad de la República
- Former name: Universidad de Montevideo
- Type: Public
- Established: 18 July 1849; 177 years ago
- Rector: Héctor Cancela
- Undergraduates: 137,757 (2018)
- Postgraduates: 6,351 (2012)
- Location: Montevideo, Uruguay; 34°54′09″S 56°10′36″W
- Campus: Urban
- Website: www.udelar.edu.uy

The University of the Republic (Spanish: Universidad de la República, sometimes UdelaR) is a public research university in Montevideo, Uruguay. It is the country's oldest and largest university, as well as one of the largest public universities in South America in terms of enrollment. Established in 1849, it has educated the vast majority of Uruguay's professionals throughout history and has maintained a leading role in advancing academic research and higher education.

The University of the Republic enrolls more than 140,000 students and is organized into 16 independent faculties. It administers seven university schools and scientific institutes, the Hospital Clinic Manuel Quintela, as well as three regional university centers that serve different parts of the country.

== History ==
The process of founding the country's first public university began on 11 June 1833, when a law proposed by then-Senator Dámaso Antonio Larrañaga was passed. It called for the creation of nine academic departments; the President of the Republic would pass a decree formally creating the departments once the majority of them were in operation. In 1836 the House of General Studies was formed, housing the departments of Latin, philosophy, mathematics, theology and jurisprudence.

On 27 May 1838, Manuel Oribe passed a decree through which created the Greater University of the Republic. That decree had few practical effects, given the institutional instability of the Oriental Republic of the Uruguay at that time.

== Ranking ==
University rankings

Global – Overall
- ARWU World: 801-900 (2019)
- QS World: =650 (2026)
- USNWR Global: 852 (2026)

In 2019, according to University Ranking by Academic Performance, it is the best university in Uruguay and it stands in the 801-900 bracket among the best universities in the world. According to the 2026 QS World University Rankings, it ranked #650 worldwide.

== Faculties ==
The university comprises 16 faculties. Its buildings and facilities are scattered throughout the city.

- Faculty of Agronomy
- Faculty of Architecture, Design, and Urbanism
- Faculty of Arts
- Faculty of Chemistry
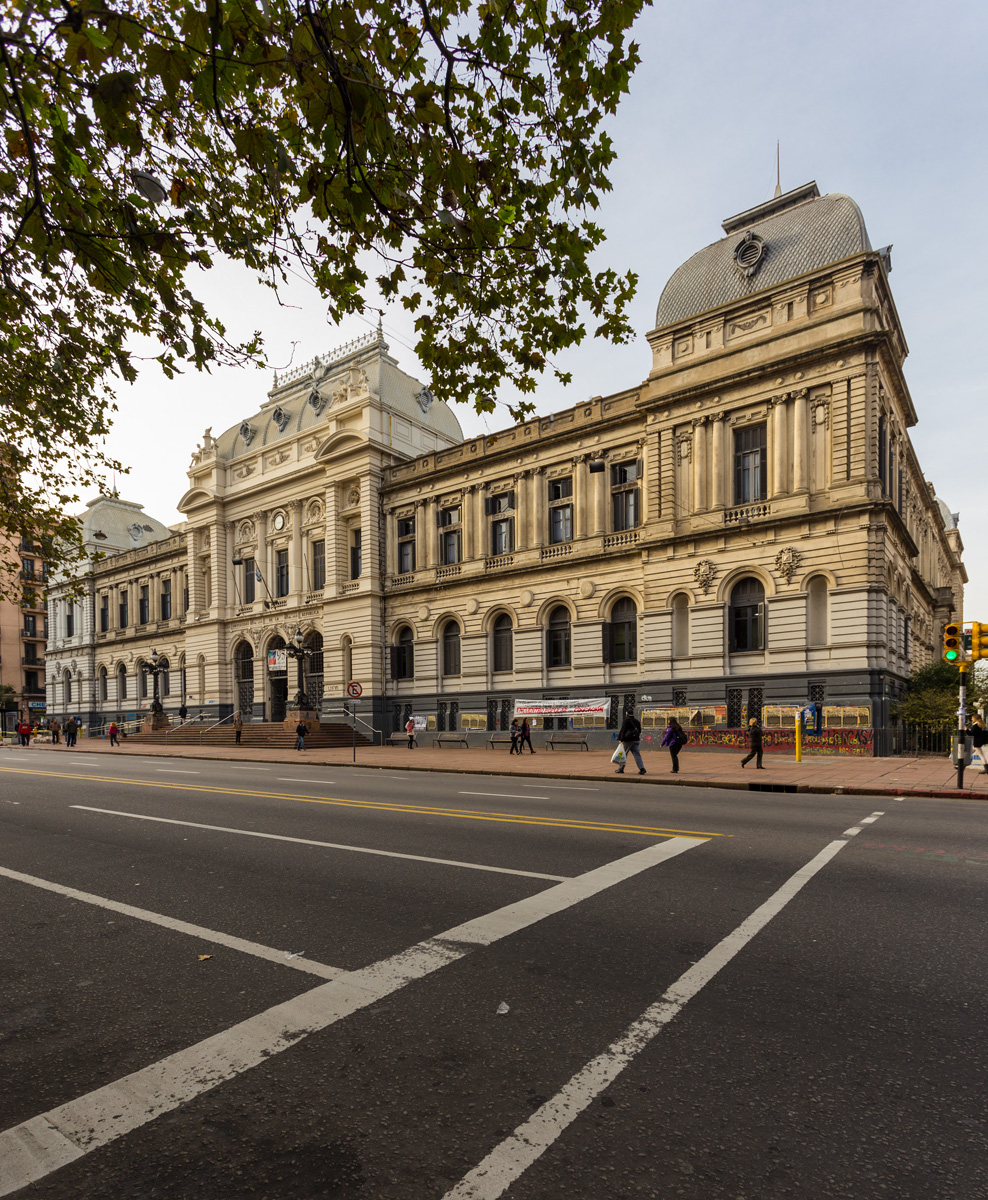
  Main building and Law School.
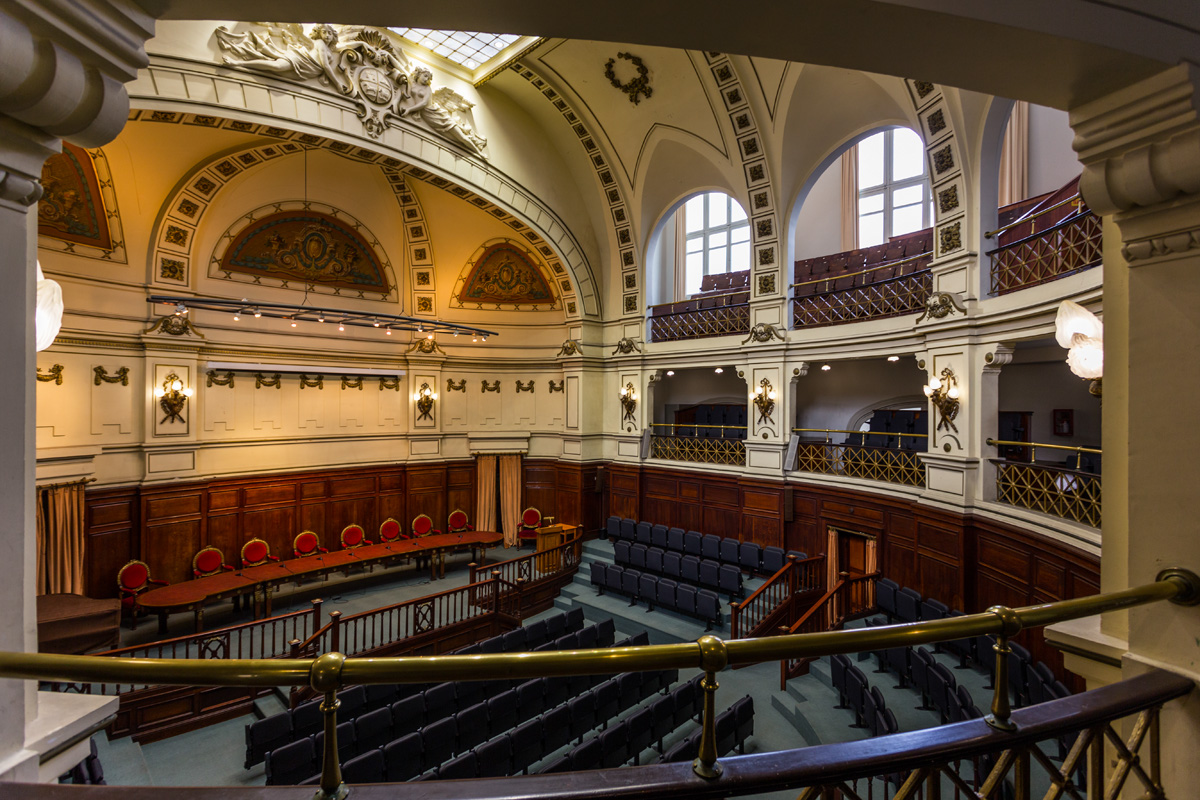
  Main building, interior.
- Faculty of Economics and Business Administration
- Faculty of Engineering
- Faculty of Humanities and Education Science
- Faculty of Law
- Faculty of Medicine
- Faculty of Nursing
- Faculty of Odontology
- Faculty of Psychology
- Faculty of Science
- Faculty of Social Science
- Faculty of Veterinary Medicine
- Faculty of Information and Communication

=== Law School ===
The University of the Republic Law School was established on June 18, 1838, as the Academy of Jurisprudence, making it the oldest law school in the nation. It became a branch of the University of the Republic on July 18, 1849. It is the only branch of the university that hasn't moved from the main building in Cordón, Montevideo. It was the only law school in Uruguay until the arrival of the Catholic University of Uruguay in 1984.

Many Presidents of Uruguay, senators, representatives and other public authorities with a law degree have graduated from this law school. Notable professors include Jorge Gamarra, Alejandro Abal, Alberto Perez Perez, Dora Bagdassarian, Helios Sarthou, Carlos Delpiazzo, Gonzalo Fernández, and Daniel Ferrere.

The Dean is Dr. Gonzalo A. Lorenzo Idiarte. Its main executive organ is the Law School Council, integrated by the dean and members in representation of students, former students and professors.

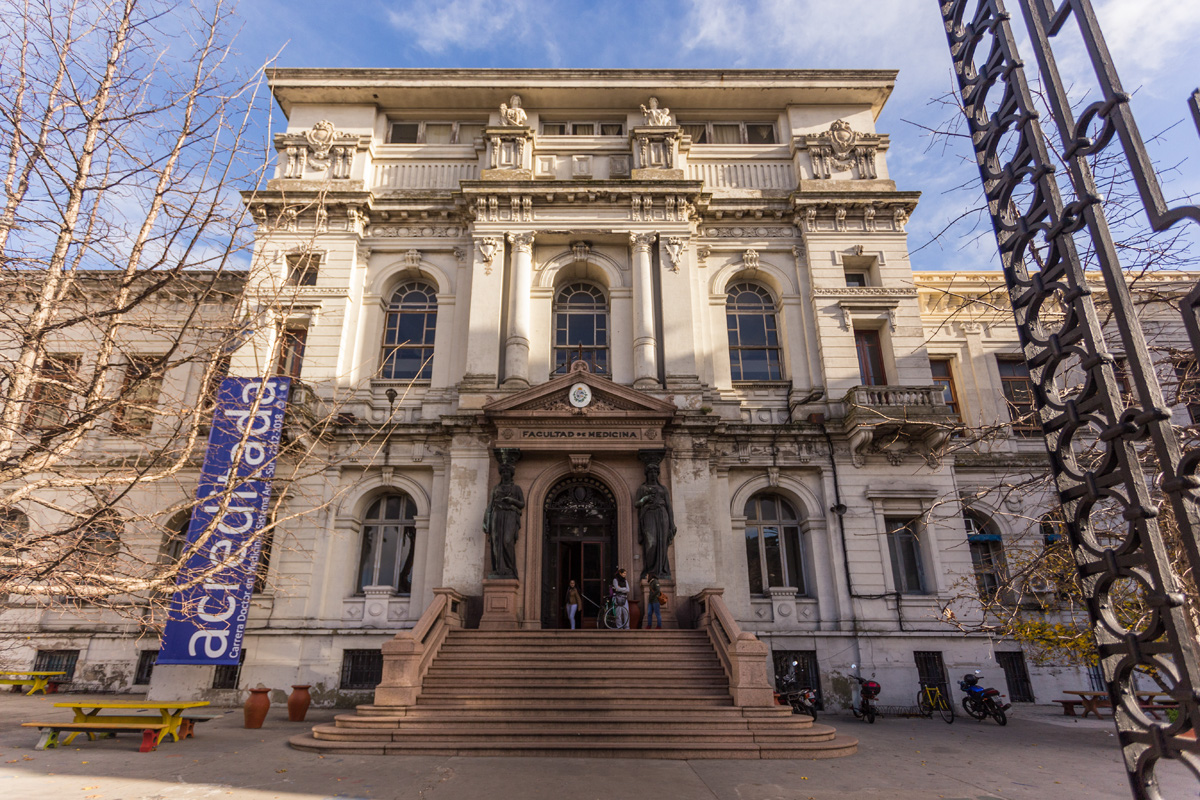
School of Medicine.

== Schools and Institutes ==
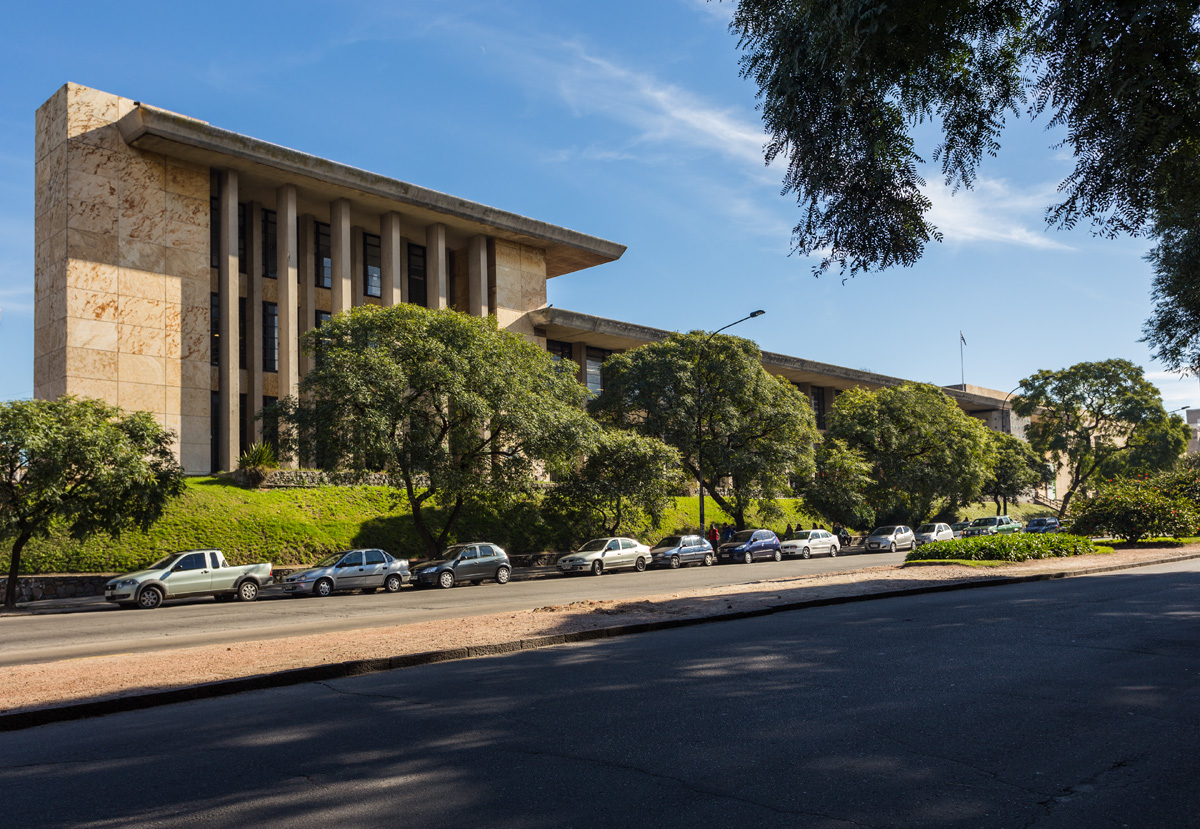
- School of Architecture, Design, and Urbanism.
  School of Administration
- School of Medical Technology
- School of Nutrition and Dietetics
- School of Obstetrics
- School of Odontological Technology

=== Hospital ===
The university has its own hospital in Montevideo, Hospital de Clínicas "Dr. Manuel Quintela".

== Other cities ==
In an effort to decentralize higher education, the university has opened schools in cities other than Montevideo. Its Regional Norte in Salto offers degrees in Architecture, Law and Nursing. Fragments of other degrees, which can be completed in Montevideo, are also offered there. At the Casa Universitaria in Rivera, the Faculty of Sciences offers the Technicature in Management of Environmental Resources, which has a duration of two and a half years.

=== Collaborations with UTU and UTEC ===
The University of the Republic School of Engineering offers certain courses in collaboration with the University of Labor of Uruguay and Technical University of Uruguay in order to increase penetration of these orientations outside of the capital city. Currently the only course being offered in this manner is Informatics Technologist.

School of Agronomy at completion.

== Notable alumni, faculty and staff ==
- Beatriz Amendola, Radiation oncologist
- Teresita de Barbieri, Feminist sociologist
- Lucrecia Covelo, Entomologist
- Ana Denicola, Professor of Physical Biochemistry
- José Batlle y Ordóñez, Former president of Uruguay (1903-1907, 1911-1915), president of the National Council of Administration (1921-1923)
- Luis Alberto de Herrera, Lawyer, politician and diplomat. President of the National Council of Administration (1925-1927)
- Carlos Vaz Ferreira, Professor of Philosophy, writer and pragmatist philosopher.
- Tabaré Vázquez, Professor of Oncology, former president of Uruguay (2005-2010, 2015-2020)
- Danilo Astori, Former vice-president of Uruguay (2010-2015) senator and Minister of Economy. Professor of Economics.
- Beatriz Argimón, Former vice-president of Uruguay (2020-2025)
- Ida Holz, Engineer, researcher, Internet pioneer
- Carolina Cosse, Engineer. vice-president of Uruguay (2025-2030)
- Luis Alberto Lacalle, Lawyer, former president of Uruguay (1990-1995)
- Ramón Díaz (economist), Professor of Economics, former president of the Mont Pelerin Society
- Rafael Radi, Professor of Biochemistry, Foreign Associate of the US National Academy of Science.
- Rodrigo Arocena, Professor of Mathematics, former rector (2006-2014).
- Enrique V. Iglesias, Professor of Economics, former president of the Central Bank of Uruguay (1967-1969), former president of the Inter-American Development Bank (1988-2005).
- Julio Ángel Fernández, Professor of Astronomy, member of the National Academy of Sciences.
- Clemente Estable, Professor of Neurobiology, pedagogue and cell theorist.

== See also ==
- List of universities in Uruguay
- Education in Uruguay
