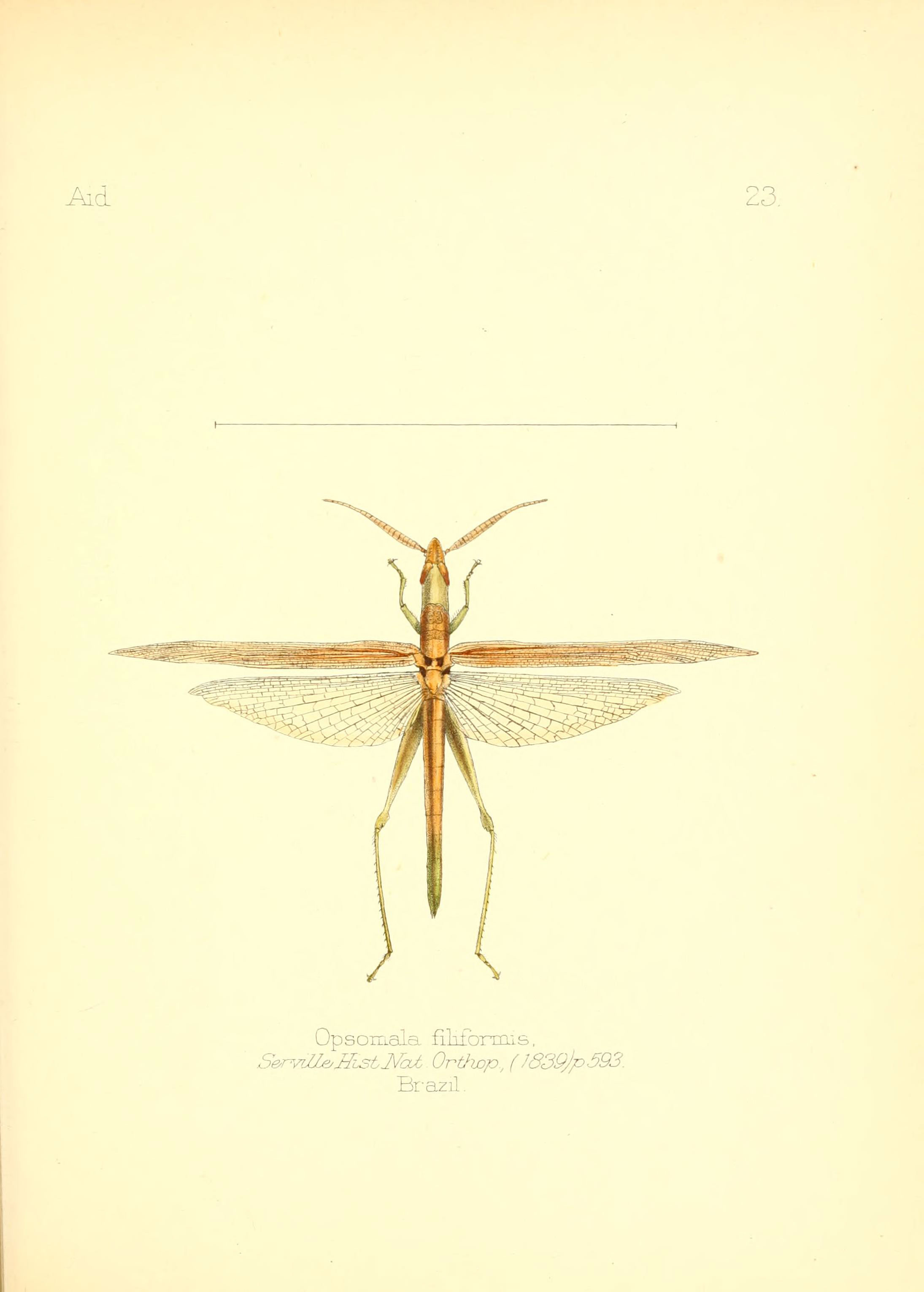
- Leptysma

Scientific classification
- Kingdom: Animalia
- Phylum: Arthropoda
- Clade: Pancrustacea
- Class: Insecta
- Order: Orthoptera
- Suborder: Caelifera
- Family: Acrididae
- Subfamily: Leptysminae

Tribes
- Chloropseustini Amédégnato, 1974; Leptysmini Brunner von Wattenwyl, 1893; Tetrataeniini Brunner von Wattenwyl, 1893

= Leptysminae =

Subfamily of grasshoppers

Leptysminae is a subfamily of grasshoppers in the family Acrididae. Members of this subfamily are known as spur-throat toothpick grasshoppers. There are at least 20 genera in Leptysminae, found in North, Central, and South America.

== Genera ==
These 21 genera belong to the subfamily Leptysminae:

- Belosacris Rehn & Eades, 1961^{c g}
- Carbonellacris Roberts, 1977^{c g}
- Chloropseustes Rehn, 1918^{c g}
- Columbacris Bruner, 1911^{c g}
- Cornops Scudder, 1875^{c g}
- Cylindrotettix Bruner, 1906^{c g}
- Eumastusia Bruner, 1911^{c g}
- Guetaresia Rehn, 1929^{c g}
- Haroldgrantia Carbonell, Ronderos & Mesa, 1967^{c g}
- Leptysma Stål, 1873^{i c g b}
- Leptysmina Giglio-Tos, 1894^{c g}
- Mastusia Stål, 1878^{c g}
- Nadiacris Descamps & Amédégnato, 1972^{c g}
- Oxybleptella Giglio-Tos, 1894^{c g}
- Oxyphyma Saussure, 1861^{c g}
- Seabratettix Roberts, 1980^{c g}
- Stenacris Walker, 1870^{i c g b}
- Stenopola Stål, 1873^{c g}
- Tetrataenia Stål, 1873^{c g}
- Tucayaca Bruner, 1920^{c g}
- Xenismacris Descamps & Amédégnato, 1972^{c g}

Data sources: i = ITIS, c = Catalogue of Life, g = GBIF, b = Bugguide.net
