= Michael Farthing =

British academic (born 1948)

- Born: Michael John Godfrey Farthing; 1948 (age 77–78)
- Known for: Editor Gut (1996-2002); Vice chancellor at University of Sussex; Committee on Publication Ethics (COPE)
- Medical career
- Profession: Physician
- Institutions: St Bartholomew's Hospital Medical College; University of Glasgow; Sussex University
- Sub-specialties: Gastroenterology

Michael John Godfrey Farthing (born 1948) is a British emeritus professor at the University of Sussex, where he was previously its vice-chancellor (2007–2016). His early academic career was in medicine, specialising in gastroenterology.

Following an appointment as research fellow, honorary lecturer in gastroenterology at St Bartholomew's Hospital, London, in 1980, he was appointed Wellcome Tropical Lecturer and worked in India, Boston and Costa Rica as visiting lecturer and assistant professor. In 1983, upon returning to the UK, he became senior lecturer and honorary consultant back at Barts' department of gastroenterology. In 1990 he was appointed professor of gastroenterology at St Bartholomew's Hospital Medical College and held this post for five years. He later became Executive Dean of the Faculty of Medicine and Professor of Medicine at the University of Glasgow. Following this, he was honorary consultant gastroenterologist for the St George's Healthcare NHS Trust from 2003 to 2007.

From 1996 to 2002 he served as editor of Gut. It was during his time as editor that he came across the problem of research fraud. The problem of scientific misconduct led him, with other journal editors, lawyers and professor of ethics, to cofound a UK Committee on Publication Ethics, Committee on Publication Ethics (COPE).

In 2007, Farthing was appointed the seventh vice chancellor at University of Sussex, where he led plans for re-development.

== Early life and education ==
Michael Farthing attended Henry Thornton school, a state grammar school in Clapham, London. In 1969, before qualifying as a doctor he spent time volunteering at a mission hospital in a village in the Kadapa district in Andhra Pradesh, India. He gained his medical degree from University College, London (UCL), and the University College Hospital Medical School in 1972.

== Early career ==
Farthing completed his early medical training at Addenbrooke's Hospital, Cambridge. In the 1970s he returned to India for a second time as a doctor on a film set. Following an appointment as research fellow, honorary lecturer in gastroenterology at St Bartholomew's Hospital, London, in 1980, he was appointed Wellcome Tropical Lecturer and worked in India, Boston and Costa Rica as visiting lecturer and assistant professor. Upon returning to the UK in 1983, he became senior lecturer and honorary consultant back at St Bartholomew's Hospital's department of gastroenterology. In 1990 he was appointed professor of gastroenterology at St Bartholomew's Hospital Medical College and held this post for five years. From 1995 to 2000 he was Dean of the Faculty of Clinical Medicine at Bart's and the Royal London School of Medicine and Dentistry. During this time he oversaw the postdoctoral work of Rebecca Fitzgerald. He was honorary professor and consultant physician at University College, where he was first elected in 1998.

In 2000 he moved to Glasgow and became Executive Dean of the Faculty of Medicine and Professor of Medicine at the University of Glasgow. Following this, he was honorary consultant gastroenterologist for the St George's Healthcare NHS Trust from 2003 to 2007. He concurrently held the positions of Principal, St George's, University of London from 2003 to 2007, and Pro-Vice Chancellor for Medicine University of London from 2005 to 2007.

He has also had numerous Government and national body roles. These include Co-ordinator (Gastroenterology) for the UK/Poland Health Agreement first from 1990 to 1992 and then from 1992 to 1994, and member for the Education Committee and Undergraduate Board of the General Medical Council, both from 2001 to 2008. As a member of the Education Committee of the General Medical Council, Farthing played a part in curriculum planning for the new Medical School established jointly by the Universities of Hull and York.

He was non-executive Director of the Greater Glasgow NHS Board from 2001 to 2003 and non-executive director of the South West London Strategic Health Authority from 2003 to 2007. Other positions include non-executive director of the Brighton and Sussex University Trust and chair of the Quality and Risk Committee for the Trust since 2013. Farthing became vice-chair for the UK Panel for Research Integrity in Health and Biomedical Sciences; has been Honorary Consultant in Gastroenterology to the British Army since 1991; and is a Fellow of the Academy of Medical Sciences.

From 1996 to 2002 he served as editor of Gut.

== Committee on Publication Ethics ==
In 1997 he was appointed editor of Gut, International Journal of Gastroenterology and Hepatology. It was during his time as editor that he came across the problem of research fraud. The problem of scientific misconduct led him, with other journal editors (including Richard Horton and Richard Smith), lawyers and professor of ethics Ian Kennedy, to establish a UK Committee on Publication Ethics, Committee on Publication Ethics (COPE). In 2013 in Shanghai, he presented a paper on research misconduct: A grand global challenge for the 21st century. It was later published in the Journal of Gastroenterology and Hepatology (2014).

== University of Sussex ==
In 2007, Farthing was appointed the seventh vice chancellor at University of Sussex, where he led plans for re-development. It set out plans to grow its research income, double international student numbers and increase engagement with the business community.

He led the creation of partnerships with institutions in China. He oversaw the creation of 13 schools of studies (beginning in August 2009), including the Brighton and Sussex Medical School, which altered the scope for interdisciplinary communication and collaboration for which Sussex has been known. A regular column in the university's Bulletin used to set out his vision for the development of the university.

When in office, Farthing disbanded the linguistics department — a move condemned by Noam Chomsky, a linguist. In 2012 during his tenure, the university's Centre for Community Engagement (CCE) closed. In the same year he cautioned that to re-introduce Masters courses once withdrawn takes years and could affect professions that require particular skills such as toxicology and geological sciences. In late November 2012, several dozen students barricaded themselves in the conference centre at Sussex University in protest against plans to outsource campus services. In December Farthing took action to suspend five students associated with occupations of administration buildings and restrict them from returning to campus. In early 2013 the level of student protest at Sussex over privatisation resulted in Farthing publicly considering the defunding or underfunding of the Student Union. An early day motion calling on Farthing to retract the suspensions was signed by 13 Members of Parliament. Farthing announced his intention to resign the post of vice-chancellor in September 2015.

== Other work ==
After working on and publicly speaking on Leonardo da Vinci’s anatomical drawings, Farthing wrote Leonardo da Vinci: Under the Skin, with his brother, published in 2019. In the same year he was elected Master of the Worshipful Society of Apothecaries.

== Awards and honours ==
In 1987 he was awarded the Research Medal by the British Society of Gastroenterology.

He was secretary of the British Society of Gastroenterology from 1990 to 1994, chair of the Scientific Committee UEGF 2004–2009, and president of the British Society of Gastroenterology from 2007 to 2008. between 2014 and 2015 he was president of the United European Gastroenterology.

Other awards include the International Cannes Water and Medicine Prize (2000); the Gideon de Laune Medal from the Society of Apothecaries and the Henry L Bockus Gold Medal from the World Gastroenterology Organisation.

His son is the actor Jack Farthing.

== Selected publications ==
=== Books ===
- Farthing, M. J. G; Keusch, Gerald; Wakelin, Derek (1995). Enteric infection. Chapman & Hall Medical. ISBN 978-0-412-39140-8. OCLC 32893757.
- Farthing, M. J. G (2019). Finding India: a fifty year magical, medical odyssey. London: Unicorn. ISBN 978-1-912690-47-3. OCLC 1089479863.
- Farthing, M. J. G; Ballinger, Anne (2019). Drug Therapy for Gastrointestinal Disease. CRC Press LLC. ISBN 978-0-429-55598-5. OCLC 1104087881.
- Wells, Frank; Farthing, Michael (2019). Fraud and Misconduct in Biomedical Research, 4th edition. Boca Raton: CRC Press. ISBN 978-1-85315-786-8.
- Farthing, Stephen; Farthing, Michael J. G. (2019). Leonardo Da Vinci: Under the Skin. Royal Academy of Arts. ISBN 978-1-912520-09-1.

=== Articles ===
- Gorard, D. A.; Gomborone, J. E.; Libby, G. W.; Farthing, M. J. (1 October 1996). "Intestinal transit in anxiety and depression". Gut. 39 (4): 551–555. doi:10.1136/gut.39.4.551. ISSN 0017-5749. PMC 1383268. PMID 8944564. (Co-author)
- Farthing, M. J.; Keusch, G. T.; Carey, M. C. (1 November 1985). "Effects of bile and bile salts on growth and membrane lipid uptake by Giardia lamblia. Possible implications for pathogenesis of intestinal disease". The Journal of Clinical Investigation. 76 (5): 1727–1732. doi:10.1172/JCI112162. ISSN 0021-9738. PMC 424194. PMID 4056050. (Co-author)
- Farthing, M. J. (21 January 1995). "Irritable bowel, irritable body, or irritable brain?". BMJ (Clinical Research Ed.). 310 (6973): 171–175. doi:10.1136/bmj.310.6973.171. ISSN 0959-8138. PMC 2548562. PMID 7605430.
- Farthing, Michael JG (1 December 1998). "Coping with fraud". The Lancet. 352: S11. doi:10.1016/S0140-6736(98)90273-2. ISSN 0140-6736. S2CID 54304102.
- Farthing, Michael J.G. (2003). "Mechanisms by Which Fluid Homeostasis Is Disturbed in Disease: Fluid Loss from the Small Intestine" (PDF). In Farthing, Michael J. G.; Mahalanabis, Dilip (eds.). Control of Fluid and Food Intake in Health and Disease. NNIW51 2002: New Delhi, India. Nestle Nutrition Workshop Series, Pediatric Program. Vol. 51. Philadelphia: Lippincott Williams & Wilkins. pp. 133–153. ISBN 0-7817-4843-7. LCCN 2003044698. OCLC 51855353. OL 11006530M. S2CID 68415346.
- Farthing, Michael JG (August 2015). "Nicholas Culpeper (1616-1654): London's first general practitioner?". Journal of Medical Biography. 23 (3): 152–158. doi:10.1177/0967772013506687. ISSN 1758-1087. PMID 24585603. S2CID 21102351.
