= Rafael Radi =

Uruguayan biochemist and biomedical scientist

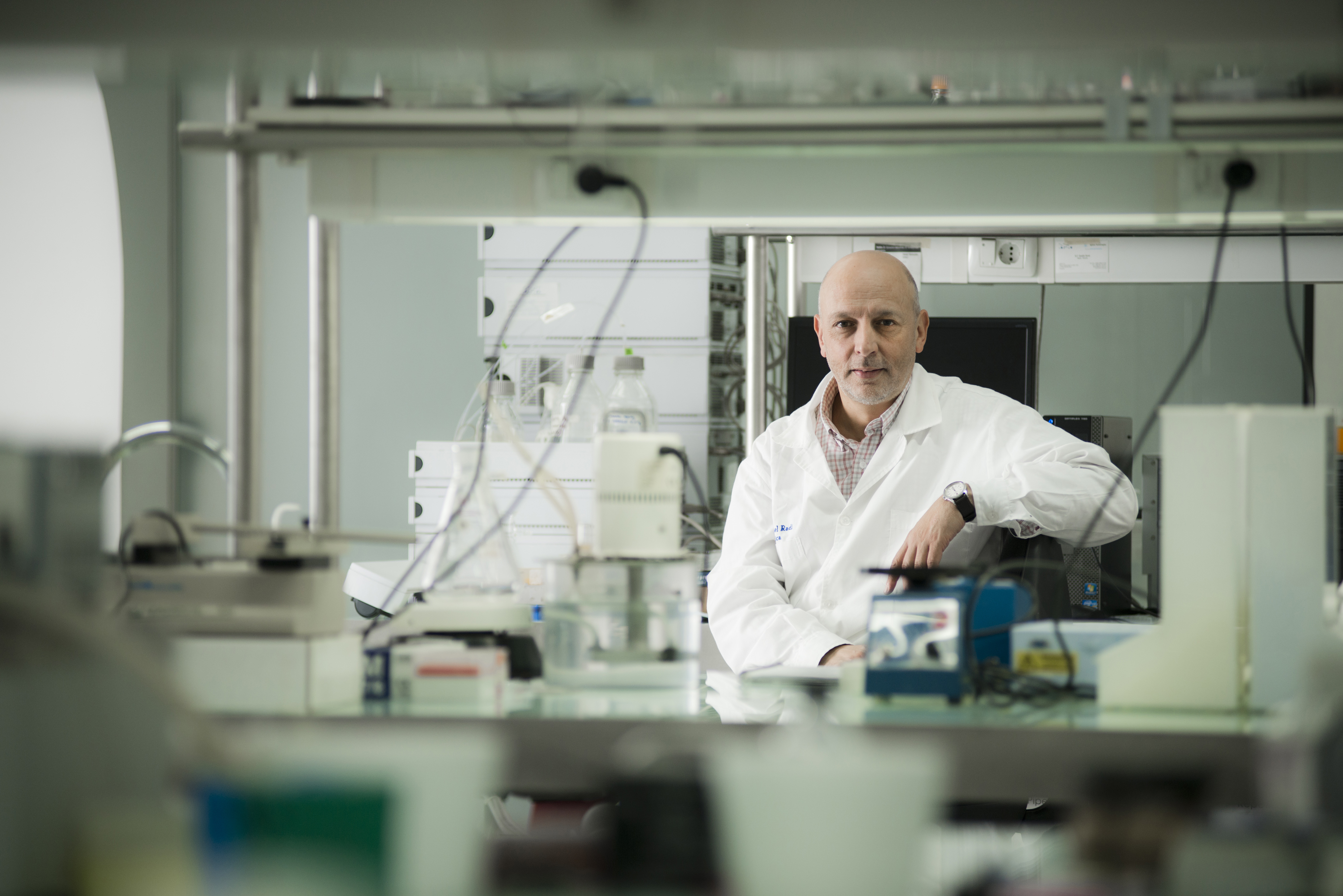
- Born: May 7, 1963 (age 63); Montevideo, Uruguay
- Citizenship: Uruguay, Italy
- Education: Universidad de la República (MD, 1988; PhD, 1991)
- Awards: Foreign Associate of the US National Academy of Sciences; Howard Hughes Medical Institute (HHMI) Alumni; Alexander Von Humboldt Senior Award; Discovery Award, The Society for Redox Biology and Medicine; Premio México 2016
- Scientific career
- Fields: biochemistry, biomedical sciences
- Workplaces: Universidad de la República, Montevideo, Uruguay
- Doctoral advisor: Eugenio Prodanov
- Other academic advisors: Bruce. A Freeman and Joe S. Beckman (University of Alabama at Birmingham)

Rafael Alberto Radi Isola is a Uruguayan biochemist and biomedical scientist who has extensively worked to elucidate molecular mechanisms by which free radicals, oxidants and nitric oxide participate in human pathologies. In particular, he has made relevant contributions to unravelling how the signal transducing free radical nitric oxide can evolve into toxic species via the formation of secondary nitric oxide-derived oxidants. His work has characterized reactions of oxidizing species with biological targets, the role of mitochondrial dysfunction is the alterations of cellular redox homeostasis and the impact of these biochemical processes in disease states. He has studied the actions of synthetic compounds in redox-based therapeutics, including cardiovascular and neurodegenerative diseases. This work has also contributed to understanding the redox biology of host cell interactions with intracellular pathogens and the impact in the control of infectious diseases. His seminal paper related to the biochemical actions of peroxynitrite, a potent oxidant and nucleophile formed secondary to the diffusion-controlled reaction of nitric oxide with superoxide radicals together with Joe S. Beckman, Kent Bush and Bruce A. Freeman in 1991 has been selected as a JBC Classics due to its influence in the field.

Radi is currently Professor and Chairman at the Departamento de Bioquímica, Facultad de Medicina and Director of Centro de Investigaciones Biomédicas (CEINBIO) at Universidad de la República, Montevideo, Uruguay. He is categorized at the highest level of the National Research System of Uruguay.

== Academic career ==
Radi started studies at Universidad de la República in 1981 and became an MD (general medicine) in 1988 and PhD (biochemistry) in 1991. He performed postdoctoral studies at the University of Alabama at Birmingham. Upon his return to Uruguay, he became tenured in the Departamento de Bioquímica, Facultad de Medicina, Universidad de la República, Montevideo, Uruguay and evolved through all the academic positions until becoming professor and chairman in 2006. In 2004 he founded the Centro de Investigaciones Biomédicas (CEINBIO) at Universidad de la República, being its director. He has adjunct appointments at the Universidad de Buenos Aires, University of Alabama at Birmingham, University of Pittsburgh and Vanderbilt University. He has extensively visited and lectured at universities and research centers worldwide and has been scientific advisor of several research institutions. He has trained over 30 PhDs and MD. PhDs in Uruguay.

In April 2020, Radi was appointed a member of the GACH, an advisory committee created by President Luis Lacalle Pou to define methods and studies to advise the government regarding the COVID-19 pandemic in Uruguay. He shared the group with Fernando Paganini, the mathematician, electrical engineer, and academic from the Latin American Academy of Sciences; and Dr. Henry Cohen Engelman, president of the National Academy of Medicine and awarded as a Master by the World Gastroenterology Organisation in 2019.

== Awards and honors ==
Radi has received numerous awards and recognition for his work. He is the first Uruguayan to be elected as International Member of the US National Academy of Sciences. Also, in 2024 he has been appointed as a member of The Pontifical Academy of Sciences, this academy "has its roots in the Academy of the Lynxes (Accademia dei Lincei) which was founded in Rome in 1603 as the first exclusively scientific academy in the world". Other relevant awards and honours include, honorary member at the Academia Colombiana de Ciencias Exactas, Físicas y Naturales, Howard Medical Institute Alumni, Alexander Von Humboldt Senior Award, Discovery Award of the Society for Redox Biology and Medicine, Guggenheim Fellow, Fulbright Fellow, Morosoli Prize of Science and Technology, Leloir Prize for International Scientific Cooperation, Doctor Honoris Causa, Universidad de Buenos Aires, Argentina; Premio México de Ciencia y Tecnología. He is a founding member and former president of the Academia Nacional de Ciencias del Uruguay, member of the Academia Nacional de Medicina del Uruguay, and foreign member of the Argentinian, Brazilian, Latin American and Developing World (TWAS) Academy of Sciences. He is a former president of the Society for Redox Biology and Medicine and former president of the Society for Free Radical Research International. Doctor Honoris Causa of the Universidad Autónoma de Madrid, Doctor Honoris causa od the Universidad de Buenos Aires and also Doctor Honoris Causa of the Universidade Estadual de Campinas .
