= Rebecca Fitzgerald =

Medical researcher (b. 1968)

Rebecca Fitzgerald OBE FRS FMedSci HonFREng
- Born: Rebecca Clare Fitgerald; September 1968 (age 57–58)
- Education: University of Cambridge (MA, MB BChir); Stanford University (MD)
- Scientific career
- Fields: Oncology, gastroenterology
- Website: www.oncology.cam.ac.uk/directory/r-fitzgerald

Rebecca Clare Fitzgerald OBE FRS FMedSci (born September 1968) is a British medical researcher who studies cancer evolution to find new ways to detect and prevent cancer, with a particular focus on oesophageal cancer. She is a tenured Professor of Cancer Prevention and is the founding Director at the Early Cancer Institute of the University of Cambridge.

Fitzgerald is a Fellow and Director of Medical Studies at Trinity College, Cambridge, and Honorary Consultant in Gastroenterology and Cancer Medicine at Cambridge's Addenbrooke's Hospital. She is the leader of the CRUK Cambridge Centre Early Detection Programme and Cambridge lead for the CRUK Alliance of Cancer Early Detection (ACED).

== Education ==
Fitzgerald received a Master of Arts degree and a Bachelor of Medicine, Bachelor of Surgery in Medicine from the University of Cambridge where she was an undergraduate student of Girton College, Cambridge in 1992. In 1997, she completed a Doctor of Medicine at Stanford University under the guidance of George Triadafilopoulos.

== Career and research ==
Fitzgerald's postdoctoral work took place at the Department of Adult and Paediatric Gastroenterology at St Bartholomew's Hospital and at The Royal London School of Medicine and Dentistry, where she was supervised by Michael Farthing and funded by an MRC Clinical Scientist award. After her postdoctoral positions, Fitzgerald began her own research group at the MRC Cancer Unit in Cambridge in 2001, under the mentorship of Bruce Ponder and Ron Laskey.

In 2004, Fitzgerald and her group developed Cytosponge, a novel screening test for Barrett's oesophagus, a common precursor to the often deadly cancer oesophageal adenocarcinoma. Cytosponge consists of a pill-sized capsule that contains a sponge, and is attached to a string. The capsule is swallowed, which expands into a sponge in the stomach. The sponge is then pulled out by the string, collecting cells from the oesophageal wall along the way. Subsequent biological analysis of the collected cells determines whether a patient has Barrett's. Cytosponge has been praised for its minimally invasive, economical design compared to the current standard for identifying Barrett's oesophagus, the endoscopy. The procedure has completed its third clinical trial, which saw it tested on 9,000 patients in the UK. The results of the BEST3 trial were published in The Lancet in summer 2020 showing that the Cytosponge-TFF3 test can identify ten times more people with Barrett's oesophagus than current GP care.

Cytosponge is now implemented in the NHS, with trials ongoing in Europe and US. A fourth major clinical trial BEST4 will enrol 120,000 patients to determine whether this test could reduce morbidity and mortality from oesophageal cancer is rolled out as a pro-active, population based screening programme.

Fitzgerald is leading a trial in collaboration with Owlstone Medical that will be testing the company's Breath Biopsy technology for detecting cancer. Because early cancer symptoms can be quite vague, new technologies are needed to try and pin-point the signals that will lead to a diagnosis. This pilot study will capture and examine the volatile molecules found in breath in the hopes of identifying signatures of metabolites from cancer cells. The team hopes to collect samples from 1,500 individuals by 2021 and will compare signatures from people with different types of cancer to healthy individuals.

In 2022 Fitzgerald led a review of cancer screening for the European Commission that led to new screening policy for EU member states.

== Honours and awards ==
In recognition of her work on Cytosponge and the early treatment of Barrett's oesophagus, Fitzgerald was awarded the Westminster Medal in 2004. In 2008, she was the recipient of a Lister Prize Fellowship, and in 2008 she received an NHS Innovation Prize. In 2013, Fitzgerald won a research professorship at the National Institute for Health Research (NIHR) for her work. In 2014, she was awarded the United European Gastroenterology Research Prize of €100.000.

The Royal College of Physicians appointed Fitzgerald as its Goulstonian Lecturer. She was also awarded the British Society of Gastroenterology's Sir Francis Avery Jones Award. In 2013, Fitzgerald was elected as a Fellow of the Academy of Medical Sciences (FMedSci). Fitzgerald has also won a grant from the Evelyn Trust “as she works to develop effective screening that will benefit patients worldwide.”. In 2018, Fitzgerald was awarded the Jane Wardle Prevention and Early Diagnosis prize, which recognises individuals who have produced world-leading research in the field of prevention and early detection of cancer.

In 2024 Fitzgerald was awarded the Morton Grossman Prize Lecturer by the American Gastroenterology Association. In 2021 Fitzgerald was elected a member of https://www.embo.org/ and in 2022 elected member of the Academia Europaea. In 2022 she was awarded the Don Listwin early detection award.

Fitzgerald was appointed Officer of the Order of the British Empire (OBE) in the 2022 Birthday Honours for services to cancer research.

She was elected a Fellow of the Royal Society (FRS) in 2024 and elected an honorary fellow of the Royal Academy of Engineering (HonFREng) in the same year.

== Public outreach ==
Fitzgerald has contributed to the public dialogue regarding cancer research, having appeared on broadcasts for BBC Radio 4 and ABC Radio Australia. In 2023, she was a panellist on the BBC Radio 4 comedy chat show Best Medicine.
