= GACH =

Advisory group for Uruguay during COVID-19

The Honorary Scientific Advisory Group (Spanish: Grupo Asesor Científico Honorario, acronym GACH) was an advisory committee created by President Luis Lacalle Pou in April 2020, as a support group on the wake of the COVID-19 pandemic in Uruguay.

On 17 April 2020, when Uruguay showed a significant number of infected people (508), President Lacalle Pou informed that his administration decided to create the group, made up of experts, in order to define methods and studies to advise the government. Its foremost experts were: Fernando Paganini, a mathematician, electrical engineer, and academic from the Latin American Academy of Sciences; Dr. Rafael Radi, the first Uruguayan scientist at the National Academy of Sciences of the United States and president of the National Academy of Sciences of Uruguay; and Dr. Henry Cohen Engelman, President of the National Academy of Medicine and awarded as a Master by the World Gastroenterology Organisation in 2019.

In mid-June 2021 was published a book named Todo un país detrás by Pablo Cohen, with all the activity of GACH.
