= COVID-19 pandemic in Uruguay =

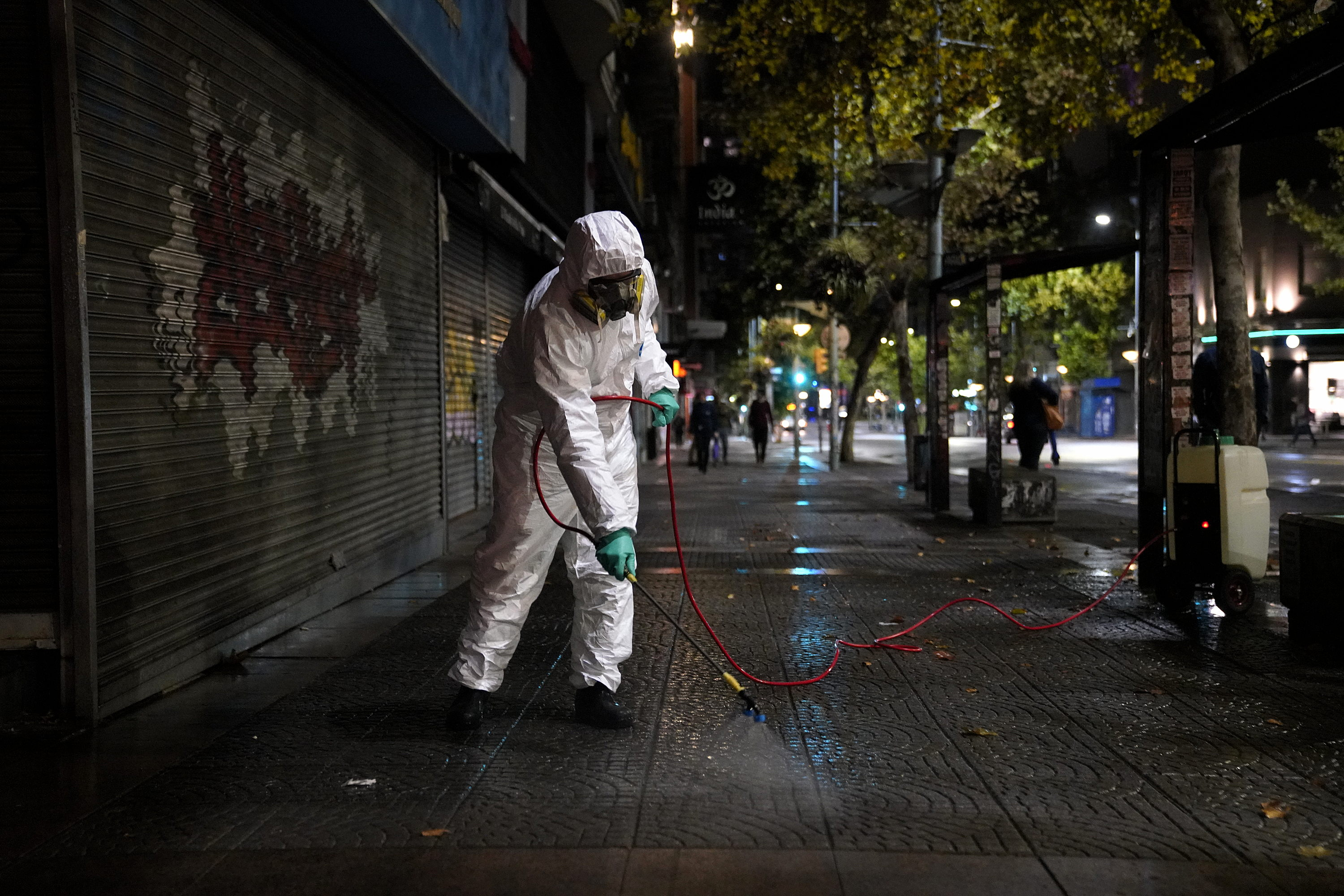
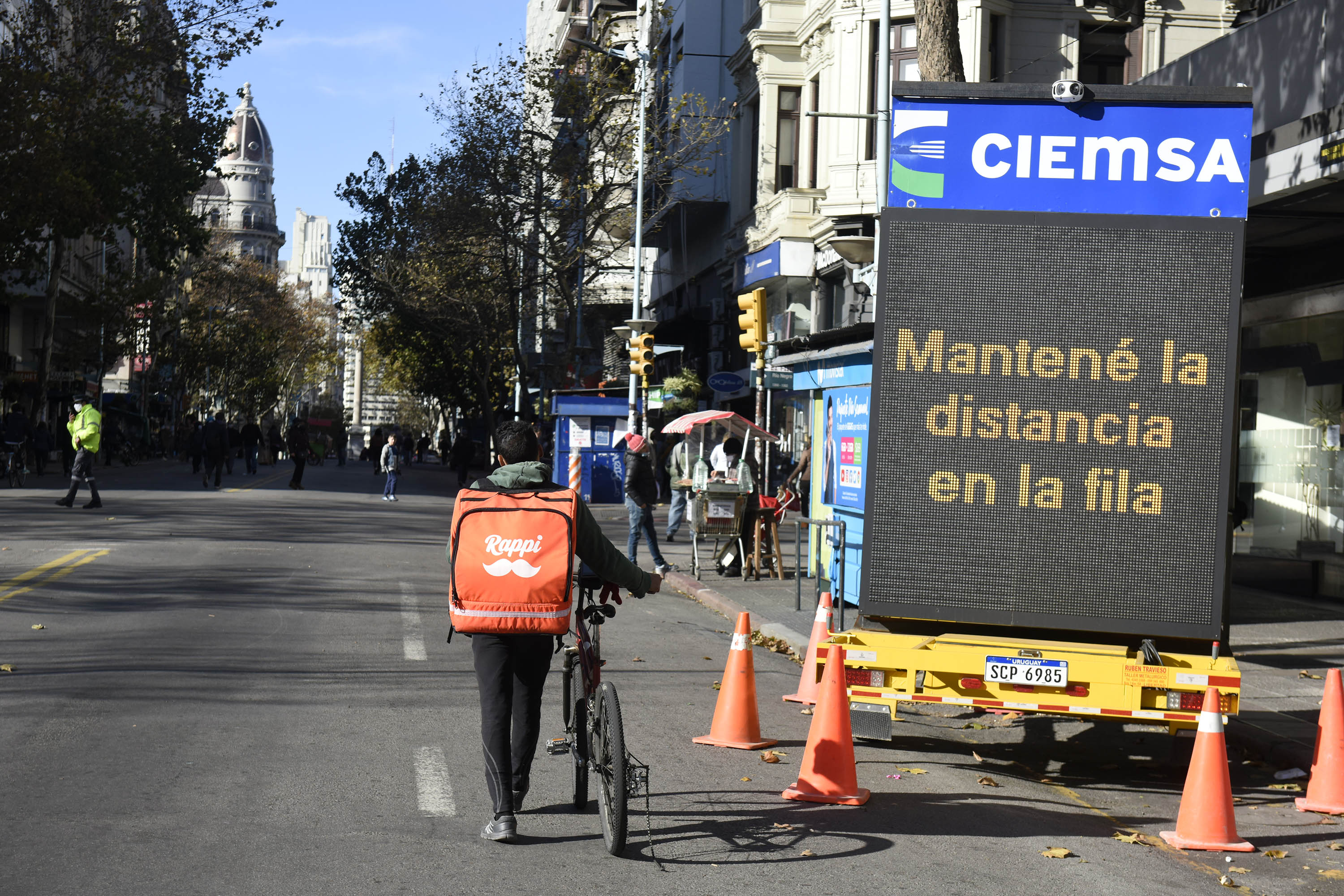
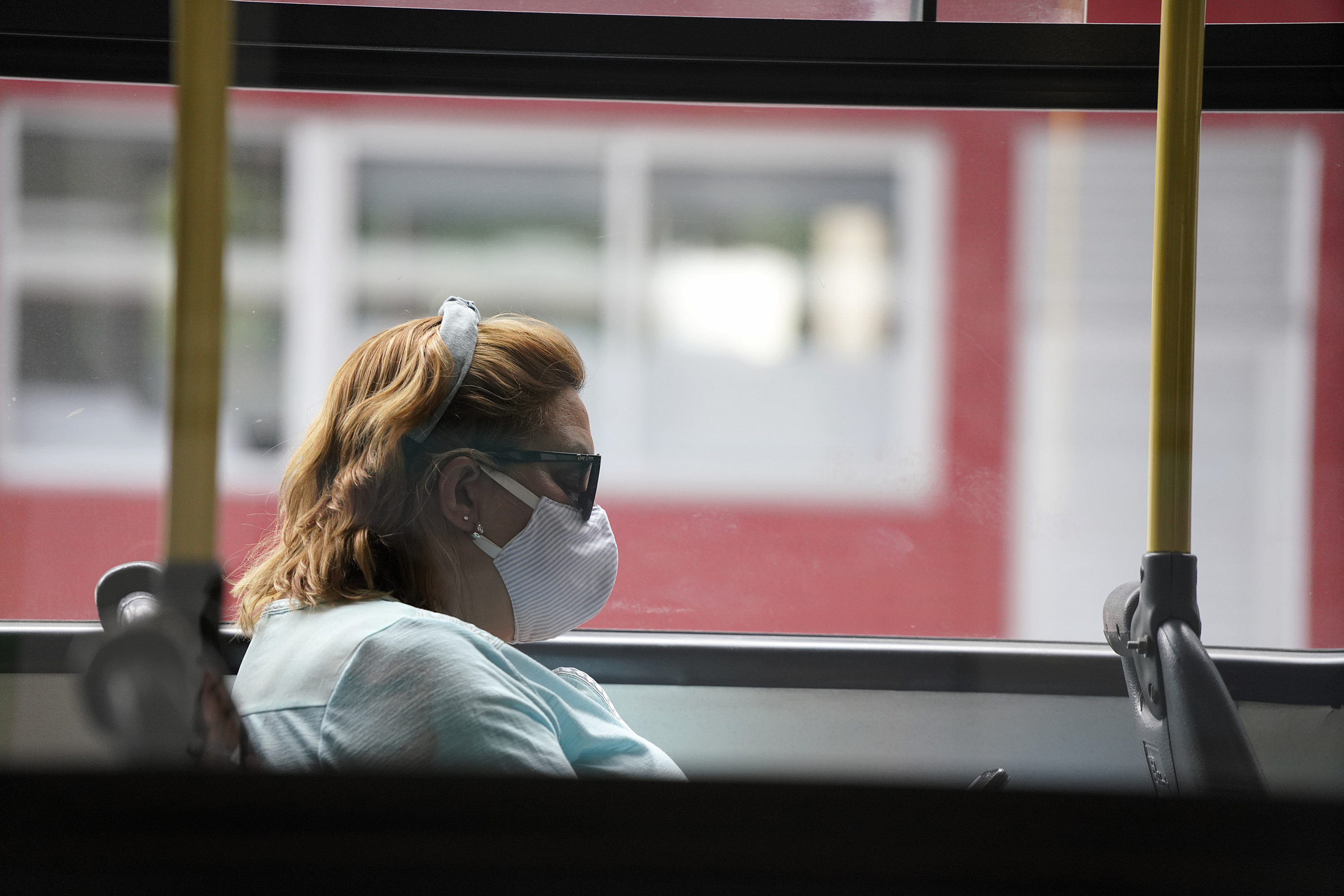
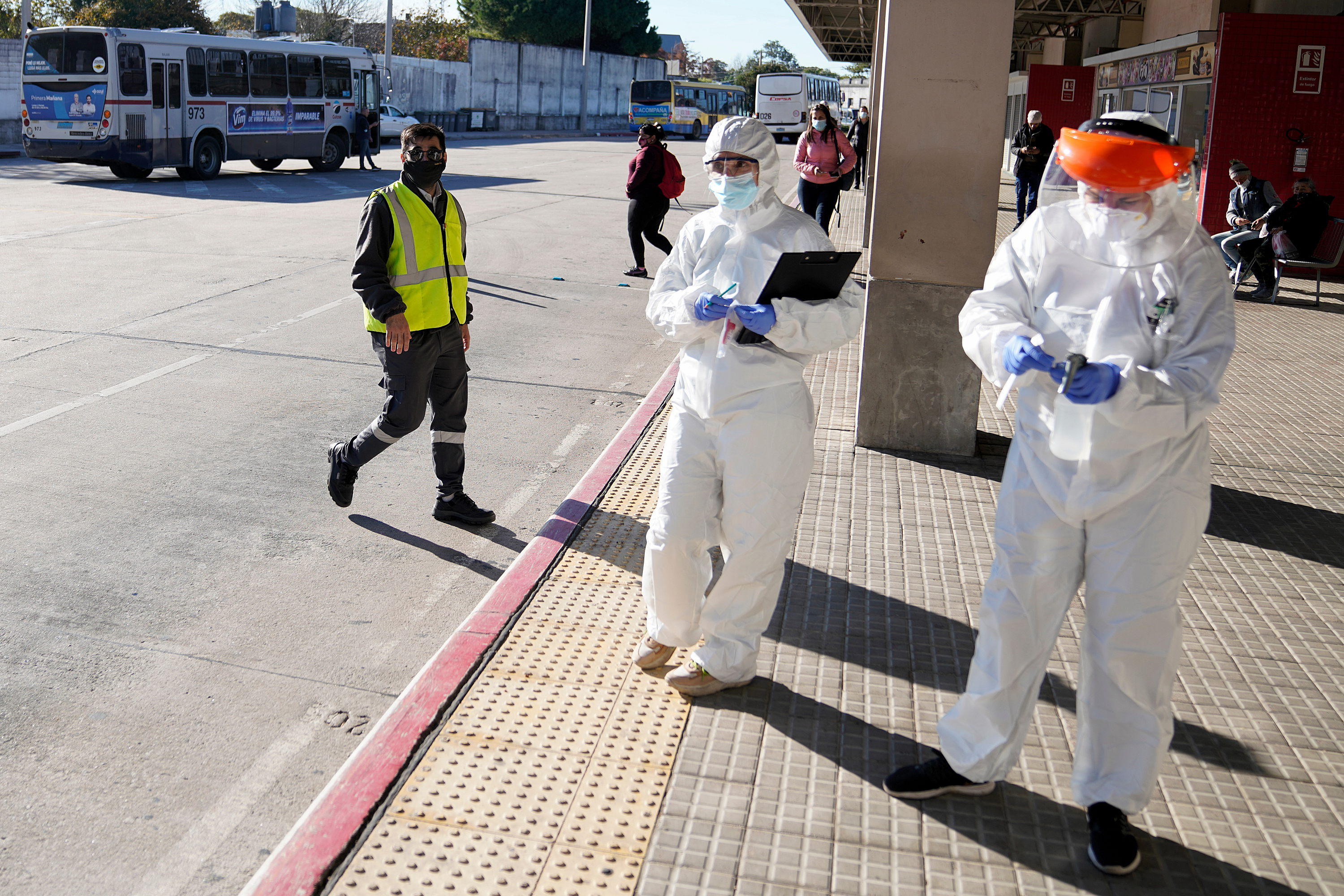
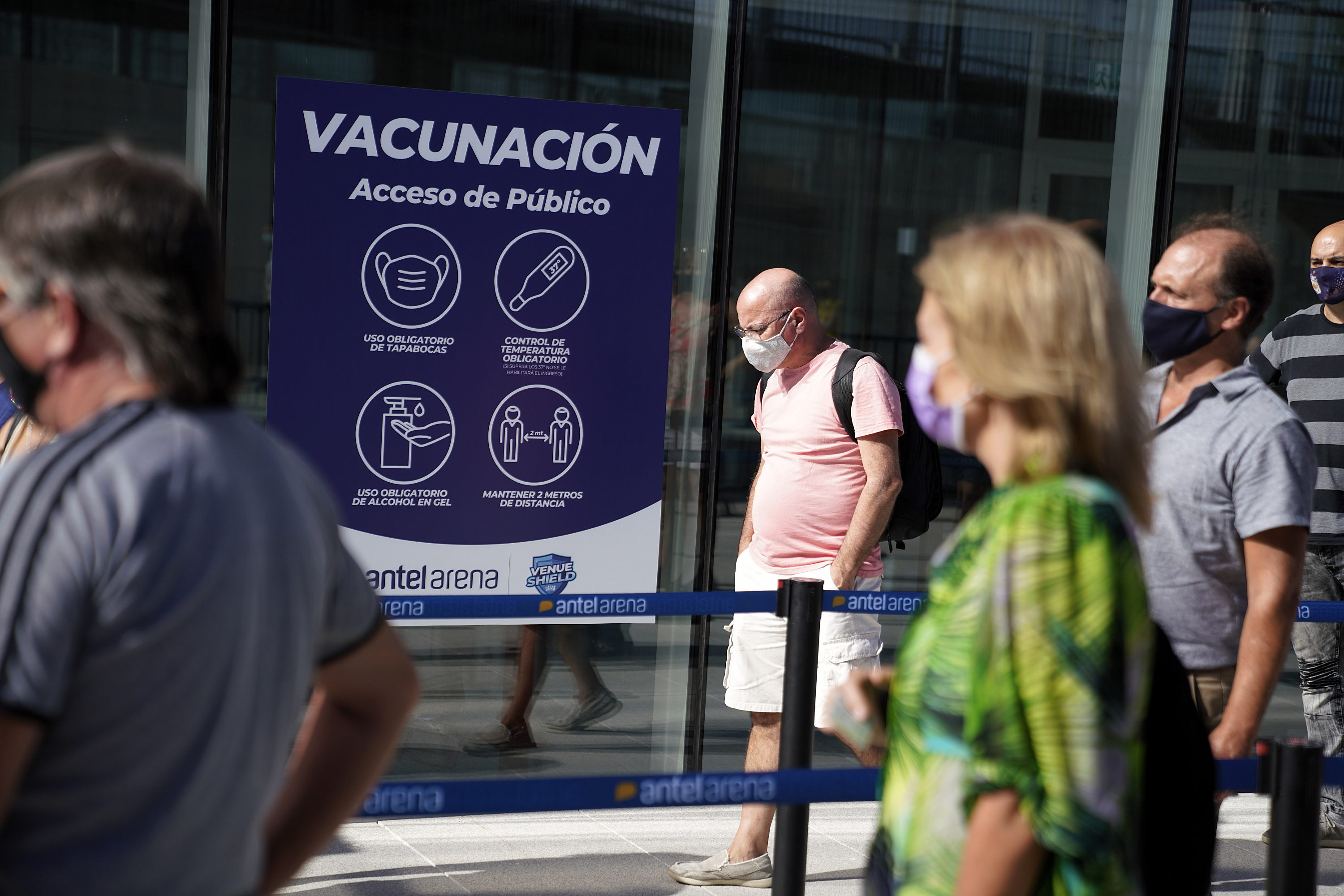
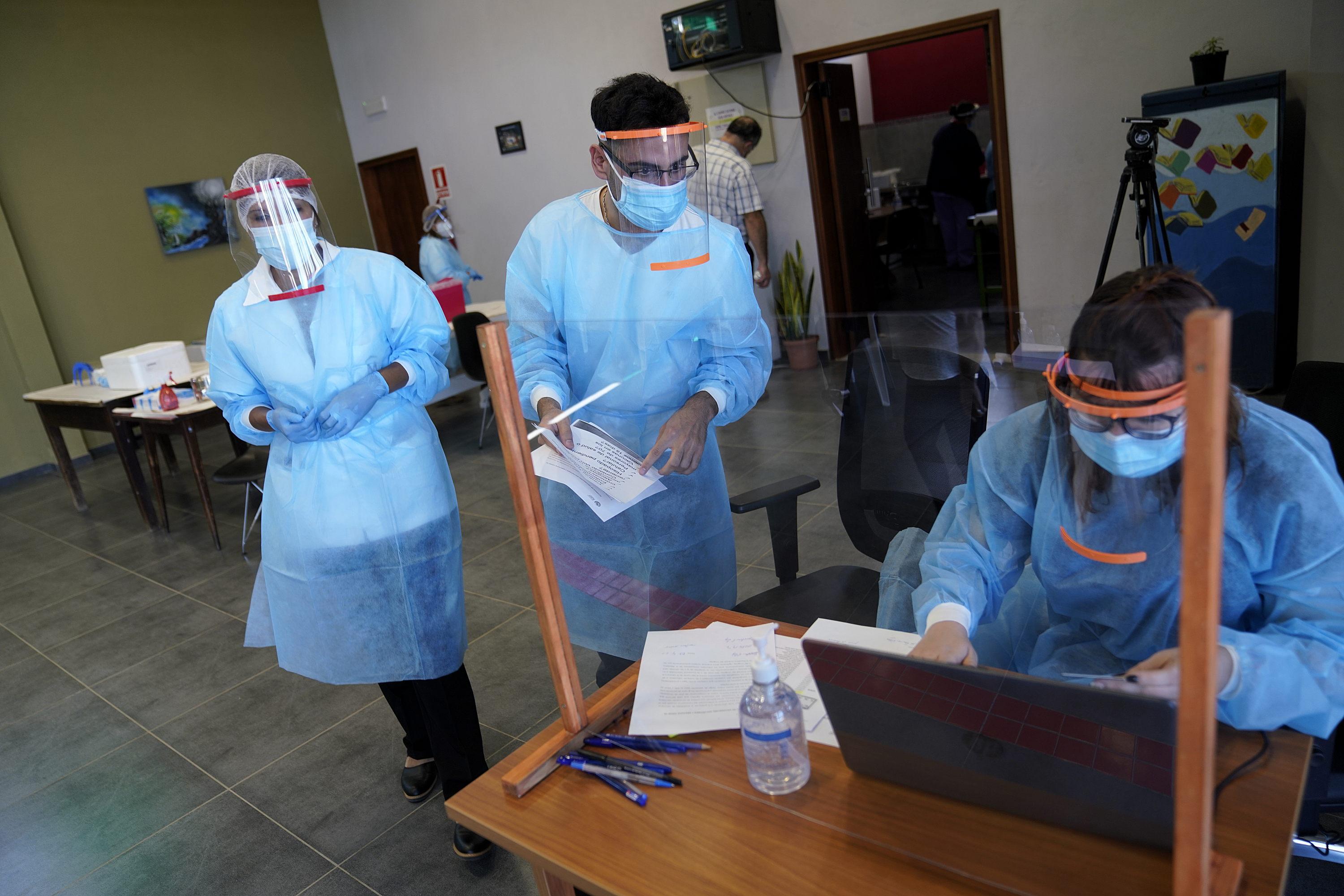
- (clockwise from top): Sanitation worker disinfecting public spaces in Central Montevideo; A sign encouraging social distancing; Sanitation workers disinfecting buses; Vaccination center in Paso de la Arena; Mass vaccination center at the Antel Arena; Commuter wearing a face mask on public transport
- Disease: COVID-19
- Pathogen: SARS-CoV-2
- Location: Uruguay
- First outbreak: Wuhan, Hubei, China
- Index case: Montevideo
- Arrival date: 13 March 2020 (6 years, 7 months and 2 weeks)
- Confirmed cases: 1,043,295
- Active cases: 59,339
- Severe cases: 165
- Recovered: 683,519
- Deaths: 7,697
- Fatality rate: 1.2%

Government website
- Sistema Nacional de Emergencias

The COVID-19 pandemic in Uruguay has resulted in 1,043,295 confirmed cases of COVID-19 and 7,697 deaths.

The first cases in Uruguay were reported on 13 March 2020 by the Ministry of Public Health. The early cases were imported from Italy and Spain, with some local transmissions. The majority of early cases were traced to a wedding with 500 people in attendance in Montevideo, attended by a Uruguayan fashion designer who returned from Spain and later tested positive. Various containment measures were introduced in mid-March, and major restrictions on movement followed in late March. Uruguay is one of the few countries in Latin America to have been able to avoid large outbreaks for a considerable amount of time due to their closing of borders with neighboring countries. The country had one of the lowest numbers of active cases per population in South America up until December when the public health authorities announced that large outbreaks had led to community transmission in Montevideo. On 23 January 2021, President Luis Lacalle Pou announced during a press conference that the government purchased doses of COVID-19 vaccines from Pfizer and Sinovac Biotech, while negotiating with a third manufacturer.

== Background ==
On 12 January 2020, the World Health Organization (WHO) confirmed that a novel coronavirus was the cause of a respiratory illness in a cluster of people in Wuhan, Hubei, China, which was reported to the WHO on 31 December 2019.

The case fatality ratio for COVID-19 has been much lower than SARS of 2003, but the transmission has been significantly greater, with a significant total death toll.

== Epidemiology ==
Cases

Deaths

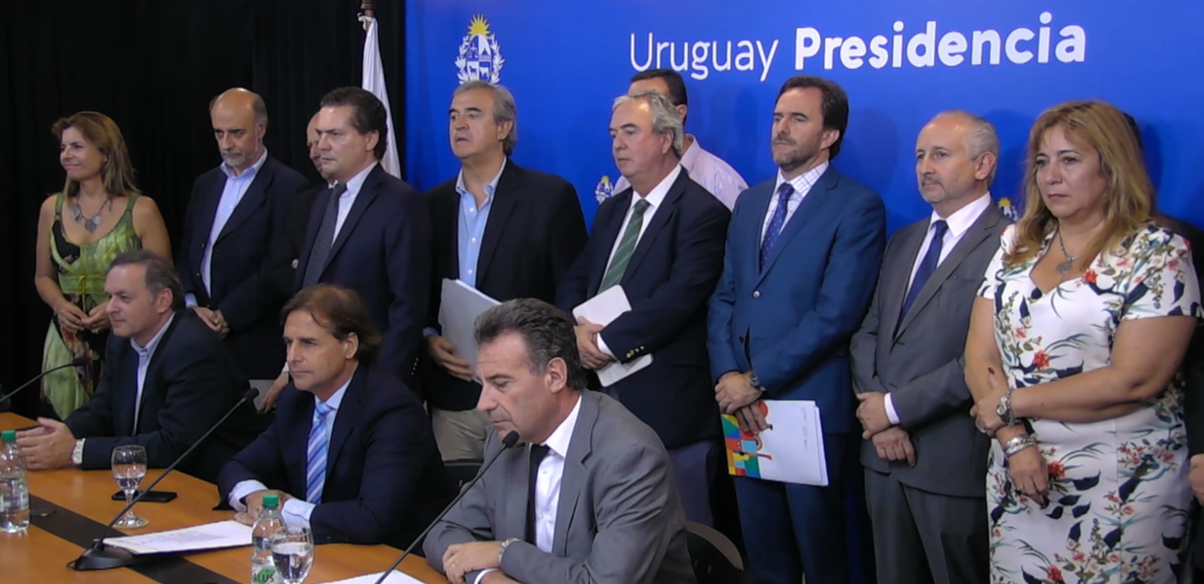
President Luis Lacalle Pou announcing the first cases of COVID-19 in Uruguay during a press conference with his cabinet.

The first four cases, all imported, were reported on 13 March. One of them had attended a wedding with 500 people, and two others had taken a six-hour bus trip from Montevideo to Salto. Some of the other passengers on this ride were contacted by the authorities and developed symptoms.

On 14 March, it was announced that the two patients who took the bus ride on 8 March generated some 200 contacts, who were categorized as suspected cases with home quarantine recommended.

Local transmission was established with two non-imported cases reported on 15 March. The first patients showed mild symptoms of COVID-19. In the preceding days, more than 60 suspected cases had been analyzed and ruled out at air and sea ports in Uruguay. It is believed that the relatively late arrival of COVID-19 cases in Uruguay is related, among other things, to the country's scarce direct air connections with the countries most affected by the virus: China, Germany, northern Italy, Iran, and South Korea.

On 15 March a doctor who works at two medical institutions tested positive. The patients who had visited him and the members of the medical team were contacted.

On 16 March, it was announced that one of the infected people was at a wedding in Paraguay and later on Friday, 6 March, went to a Uruguayan First Division football club pre-game meeting, which generated at least 20 suspected contacts.

On 17 March it was learned that other wedding attendees, three students at a private university who had attended in-person classes since then, had tested positive for the coronavirus. Their classmates were asked to quarantine.

Of the first 29 confirmed cases, 26 were in the capital of Montevideo, which is home to about a third of the country's population. Two cases were in Salto and one in Maldonado. Nine of the cases were imported and the remaining twenty were transmitted from one of the confirmed cases. Many of these early cases were related to a 7 March wedding in Carrasco with 500 people, attended by a returnee from Spain who later developed symptoms and tested positive for COVID-19. Of the country's first 55 cases, 44 were traced to the wedding. The passenger returning from Spain later said, "I asked if there were any measures at the airport because I was coming from Europe and they said no."

Uruguayan doctor Martín Stryjewski said that a "cultural change" was necessary. In Uruguay it is common to greet people with a kiss on the cheek; Stryjewski recommended that people instead greet each other without touching. He also recommended that people avoid sharing mate, a Uruguayan beverage that is traditionally drunk communally, sharing a straw. He advised that people use diluted bleach to clean frequently touched surfaces.

In early April, an outbreak was discovered at the Hospital Vilardebó. The hospital was closed and placed under quarantine as a result.

== Response ==
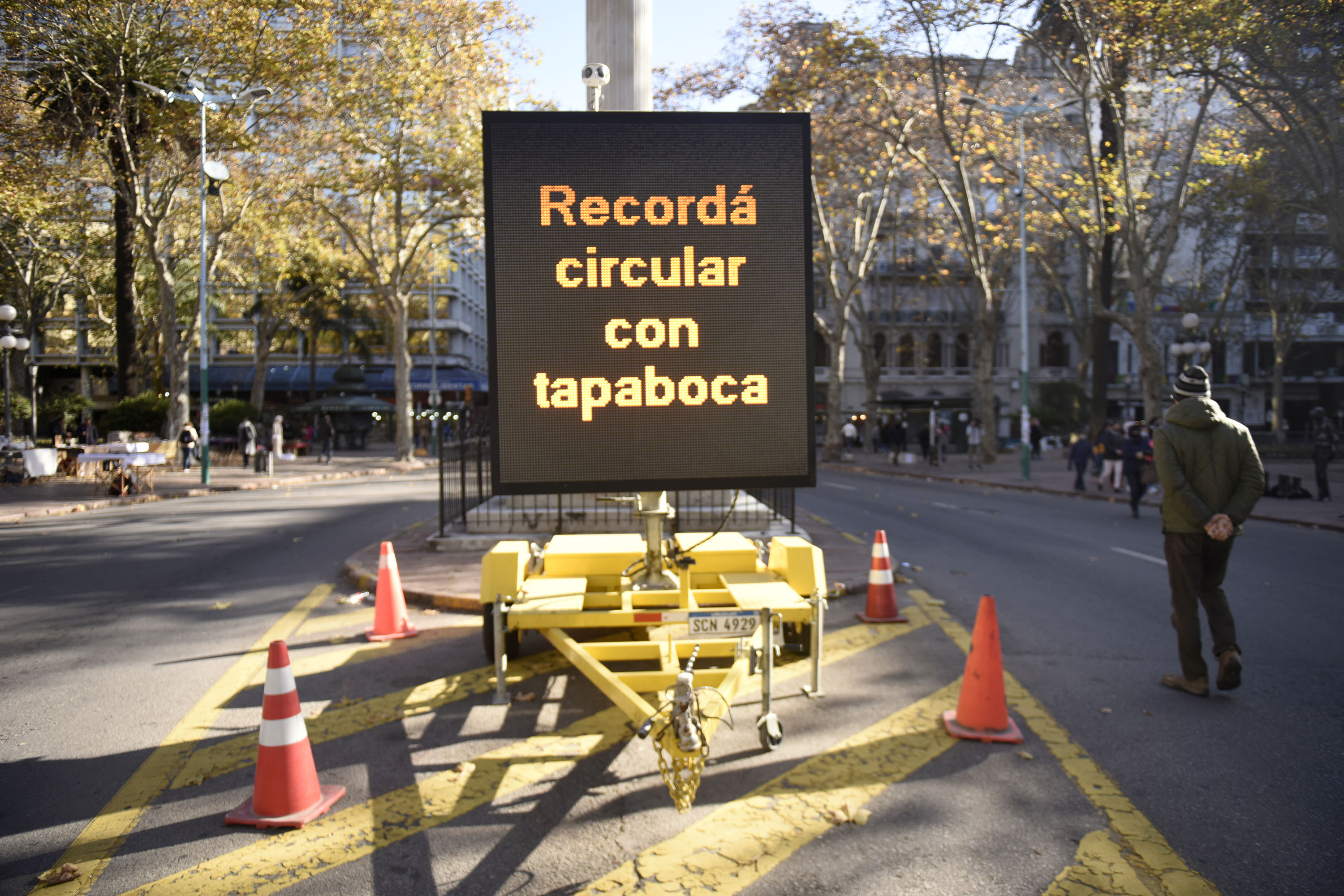
Sign in Central Montevideo informing about the mandatory use of face masks.

After the first cases were confirmed, various measures were introduced. Public performances were canceled, and some public places were closed. The Gremial Única del Taxi union asked passengers not to sit on the front seat of taxis. All political parties temporarily suspended campaign events ahead of the municipal elections, which were postponed from May to September. Movie theaters started requiring customers to sit on every other seat. Catholic bishops modified some ceremonies. Shopping centers were closed on 17 March 2020 and the Interior Minister advised residents to stay home as much as possible.

The University of the Republic cancelled classes on 13 March 2020, and later announced plans for distance learning for the remainder of the semester. The government announced a two-week suspension of classes at public and private schools on Saturday, 14 March. Schools were to remain open to provide meals to students, but without classes. The suspension of classes was extended to 13 April and beyond that. A plan to let students return to school on a voluntary basis starting in June 2020 was announced by president Luis Lacalle Pou on 21 May 2020. Students transitioned to online classes using the computers and online tools that had already been set up through the Ceibal project. Private schools that don't use Ceibal instead started using Zoom, Cisco Webex, WhatsApp, Google Classroom, and Moodle.

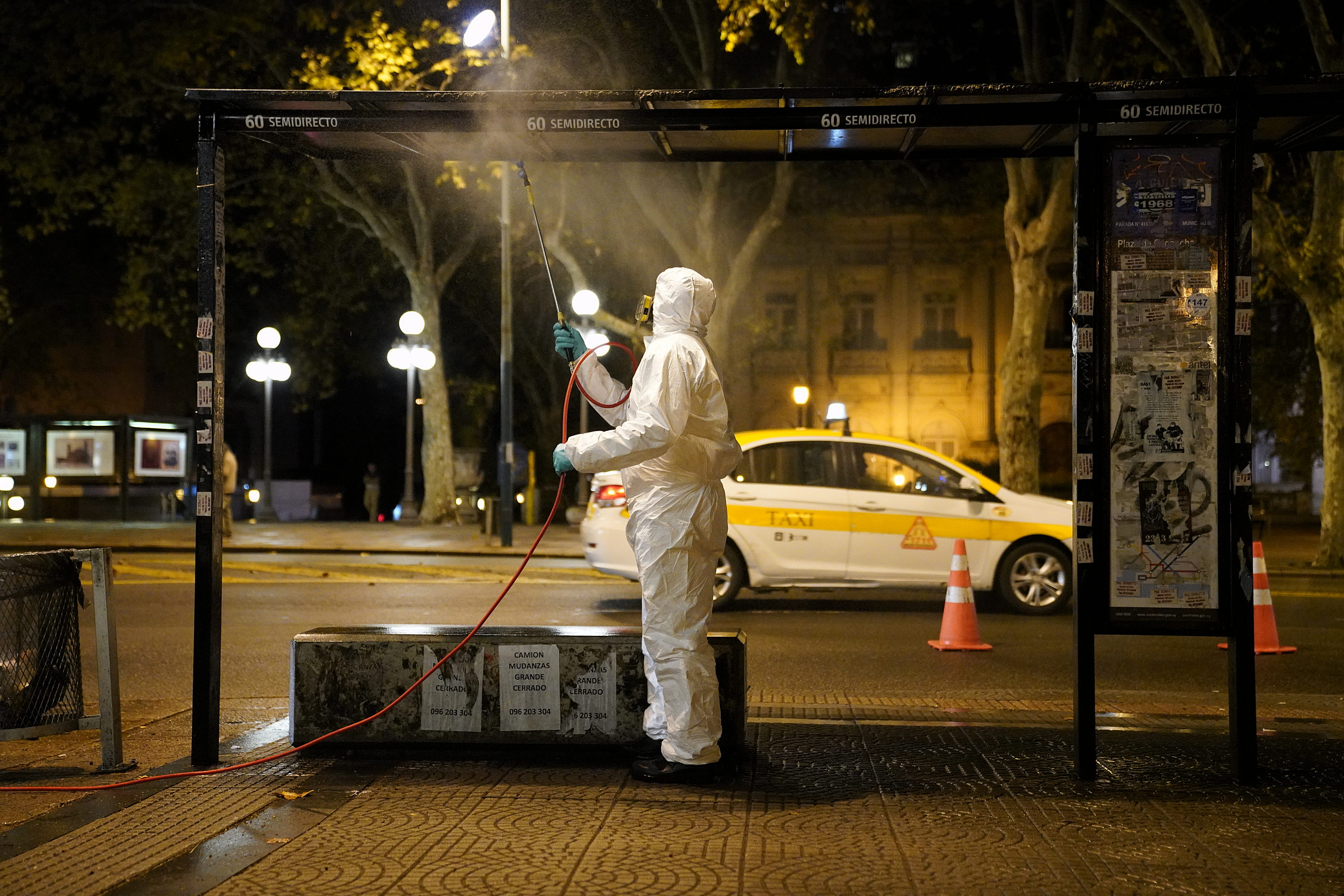
Public space disinfection in Montevideo.

On 16 March, the government issued an order to close all border crossings except Carrasco International Airport. The border with Argentina was closed effective 17 March at midnight. The closure included river and air travel. President Luis Lacalle Pou said that the idea of closing the border with Brazil was "a little more complex", because it is a dry land border, and many people living near the border live a "binational life". Lacalle Pou advised people over 65 to stay at home. Flights from the United States were suspended effective 18 March, and from Europe effective 20 March at midnight (00:00), at which point the airport was to close.

The government recommended remote work and not traveling, and introduced a free service for medical consultation by phone. To free up hospital beds, surgeries were permitted to be rescheduled. The Ministry of the Interior announced that patrol officers would circulate with loudspeakers asking citizens not to meet in large groups. Temperature checks were introduced in prisons and activities for prisoners restricted.

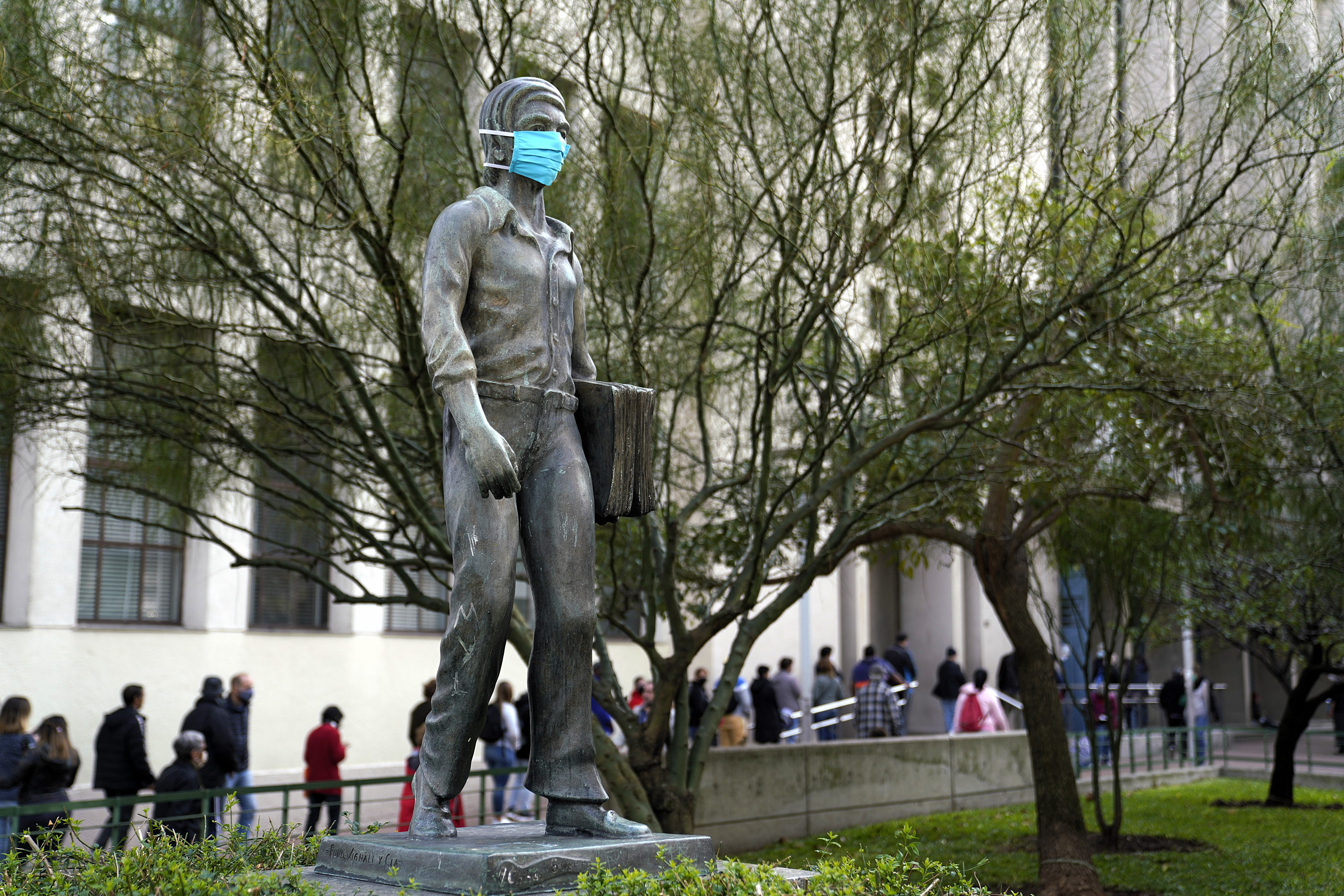
Statue wearing a face mask.

On 17 March, the Ministry of Economy and Finance published a list of prices of products such as alcohol gel, rectified alcohol, and surgical masks, in order to prevent price gouging. The list gave locations where the products could be obtained and their prices at each location.

On 18 March, the government said "everything is on the table", including the possibility of a "general quarantine", to address the virus. Amid thousands of unemployment insurance claims, the government announced subsidies and other measures to cushion the economic impact of the pandemic. The Medical Union of Uruguay (Sindicato Médico del Uruguay) called for a general quarantine (shutting down all nonessential businesses and activities). As of 19 March, the possibility was being discussed in the government but had not been implemented due to concerns about its economic effects.

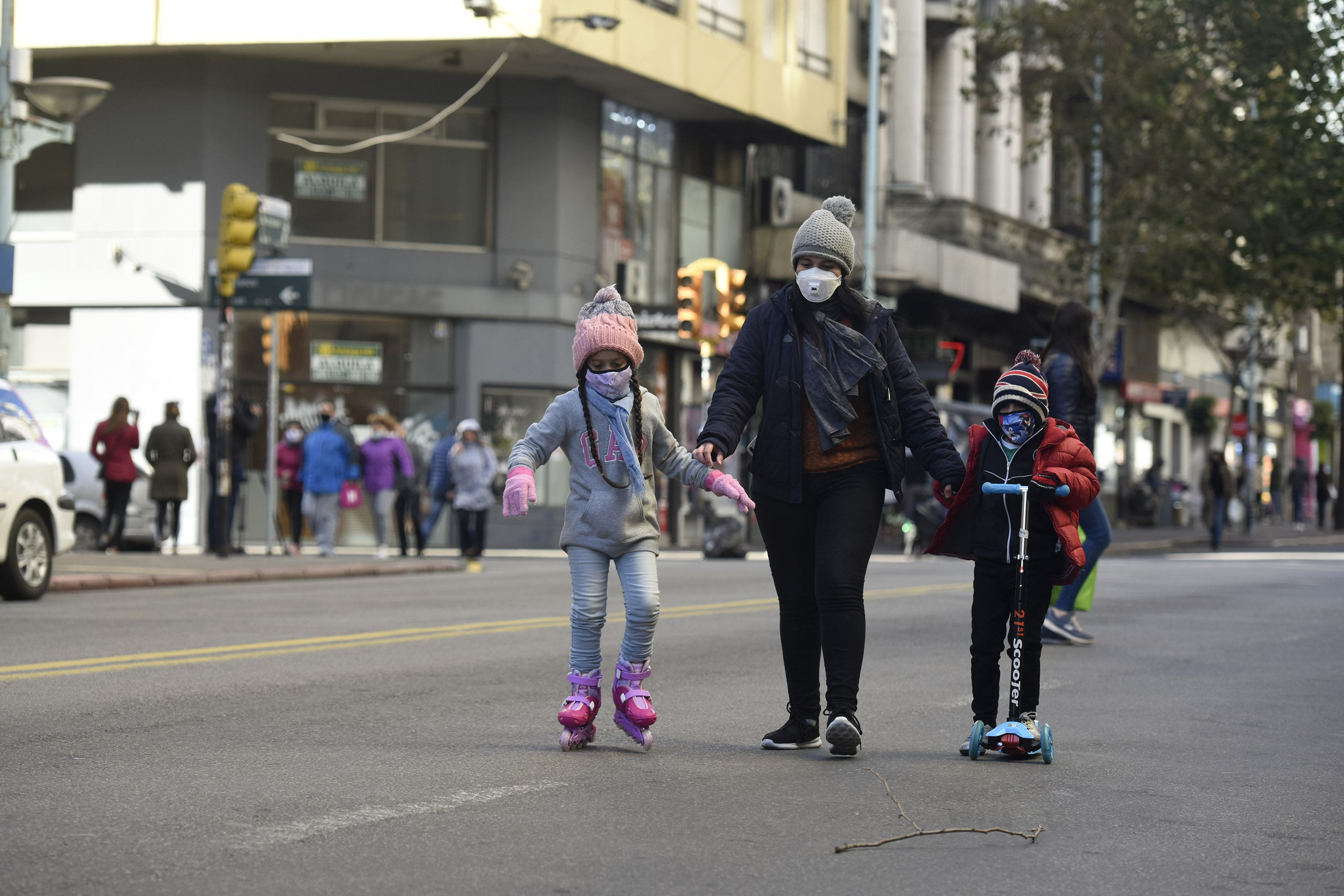
Pedestrians on 18 de Julio Avenue during the winter of 2020 as restrictions were eased.

In late March, the government closed Uruguay's borders to foreigners, with the exceptions of Uruguayan residents, transit passengers, and cities on the border with Brazil. On 30 March, the government announced that from 1 April to 12 April measures would be taken to restrict movement within the country in the lead-up to the Tourism Week (the Uruguayan term for Holy Week). Residents were advised not to use RVs or to travel with hunting weapons, and campgrounds were closed. The public was advised to stay home and avoid going to public places or campgrounds.

On 17 April, President Luis Lacalle Pou announced the creation of a group of experts, locally known as the GACH—Grupo Asesor Científico Honorario—tasked with advising the government through the development of studies and methodologies. Its principal members included mathematician and electrical engineer Fernando Paganini, a member of the Latin American Academy of Sciences; Rafael Radi, the first Uruguayan scientist elected to the US National Academy of Sciences and president of the National Academy of Sciences of Uruguay; and Henry Cohen Engelman, president of the National Academy of Medicine, who was named a Master of the World Gastroenterology Organisation in 2019.

As of 2 December, given the increase in cases (especially in Montevideo), a series of temporary measures were put into effect to slow growth. Among them the closure of sports activities in gyms and closed places, the implementation of remote work requirements, closing of restaurants after midnight and the suspension of end-of-year parties.

On 16 December, amid an exponential increase in cases, the executive branch announced a new set of measures. These included the regulation of Article 38 of the Constitution of the Republic (granting the Executive the power to disperse gatherings); a ban on entry into the country between 21 December and 10 January; a 50% reduction in capacity on interdepartmental transport during that period; the extension of opening hours for shopping centres and street markets; the reopening of gyms with a maximum capacity of 30%; and the suspension of public events. Twenty-one days later, on 6 January, it was announced that border closures and the enforcement of Article 38 of the Constitution would remain in effect for a further 20 days. It was also announced that public events would resume at reduced capacity, that sports activities would take place without spectators, and that bars and restaurants would be allowed to extend their opening hours until 2 a.m. On 27 January 2021 it was announced that as of 1 February the borders would reopen to Uruguayan citizens, foreign residents and in the cases of the exceptions provided.

On 16 March 2021, two weeks before the start of classes, President Luis Lacalle Pou announced a two-week suspension of classes in Rivera Department and the suspension of compulsory attendance in the rest of the country. A week later, on 23 March, following the confirmation of cases of the Brazilian variant in seven departments, additional measures were announced. These included the closure of public offices until 12 April; the suspension of in-person classes at all levels of education; and the closure of hot springs, gyms, and duty-free shops along the border with Brazil. In addition, the government announced the reinstatement of the 'COVID-19 Solidarity Tax' (Impuesto de Emergencia Sanitaria), applied to public officials earning more than UYU 120,000 per month, with proceeds allocated to the Coronavirus Fund. Lacalle Pou ruled out a return to a 'stay-at-home' policy, instead promoting a strategy described as 'stay in your bubble'. These measures were subsequently extended through April, May, and June.

The return to face-to-face education began on May 3, with the opening of rural schools. On June 7, first, second, and third-grade primary school students from Montevideo, Canelones, and Salto returned to their classrooms. On June 14, fourth, fifth and sixth year students from urban schools throughout the country, except those in Montevideo, Canelones and Salto, who returned to face-to-face classes on the 21st. On July 12, the students of the first, fourth, and sixth grade of high school and UTU returned to face-to-face classes; while a week later, on July 19, the second, third and fifth graders.

On July 5, public events were enabled, as well as parties and events of similar characteristics, and food courts, with capacity limitations. Movie theaters were also enabled, except those in Montevideo, Canelones and Maldonado, which were reopened to the public on July 15. Since August 18, the public was able to enter stadiums; The first match was at the Campeón del Siglo Stadium in which Club Atlético Peñarol played Club Sporting Cristal, with a capacity of 5,000 spectators being allowed in the venue.

On November 1, the borders were opened, allowing entry to foreigners who prove they had been inoculated with one or two doses, depending on the vaccine; and those who have had the disease within the last 90 days prior to arrival in the country. In the first week, more than 23,000 people entered the country, while 19,000 left.

== Impact ==
Unemployment claims increased dramatically in mid-March 2020, went down somewhat by the end of the month, then increased again in early April. There were 86,000 unemployment claims in the month of March, whereas an average month sees about 11,000. The majority (about 85%) of claims were due to suspension, and only 3% were due to layoffs.

By early April, home internet usage had increased by 32% and mobile usage had increased by 44%, according to the state-owned telecommunications company ANTEL.

== Vaccines ==
=== Procurement ===
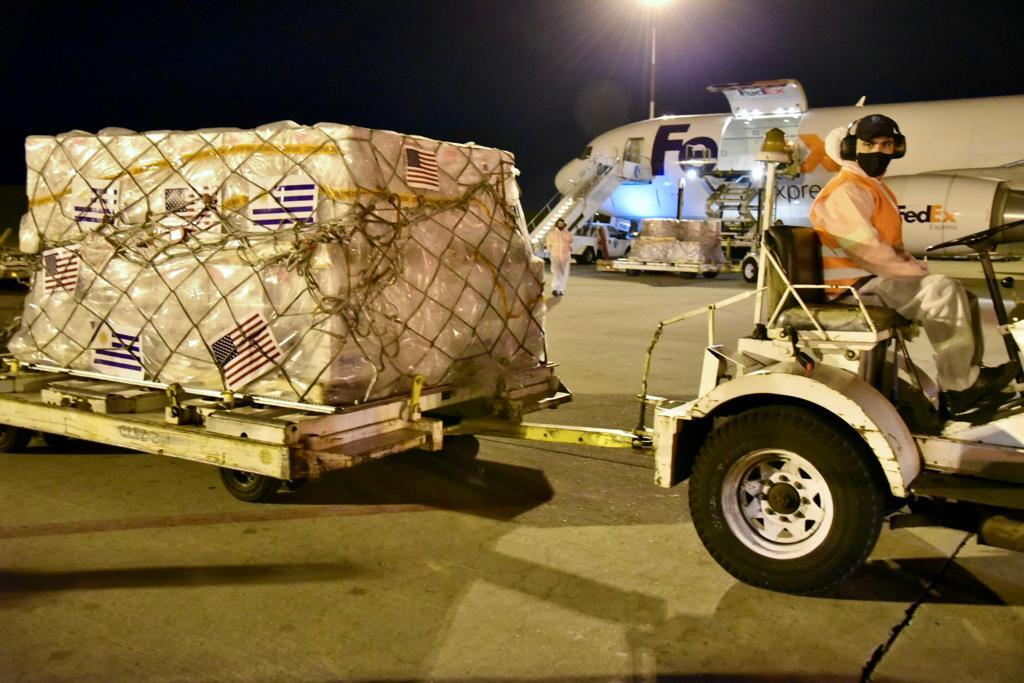
Arrival of Pfizer vaccine doses, July 2021

On 23 January 2021, President Lacalle Pou announced at a press conference that the government had purchased 2 million doses from Pfizer and 1.75 million shots from Sinovac Biotech, while negotiating with a third laboratory.

However, on 27 January 2021, Dimas Covas, director of the Instituto Butantan, the research centre which administers the purchases of Sinovac vaccines in Latin America, stated that there was not an agreement yet between the centre and Uruguay's Public Health Ministry, thus contradicting the statement that the Uruguayan government had purchased Sinovac vaccines. Nevertheless, Covas mentioned that there was a "pre-agreement" in place.

The first batch of Pfizer vaccines is expected to arrive in late February or early March, 2021. In addition, the Uruguayan government intends to acquire 1.5 million vaccines from the COVAX initiative of the World Health Organization in March 2021. On 1 February, it was confirmed that Uruguay would be supplied with the Oxford–AstraZeneca vaccines, and that with the first batch, 3% of the population would be vaccinated.

=== Distribution ===
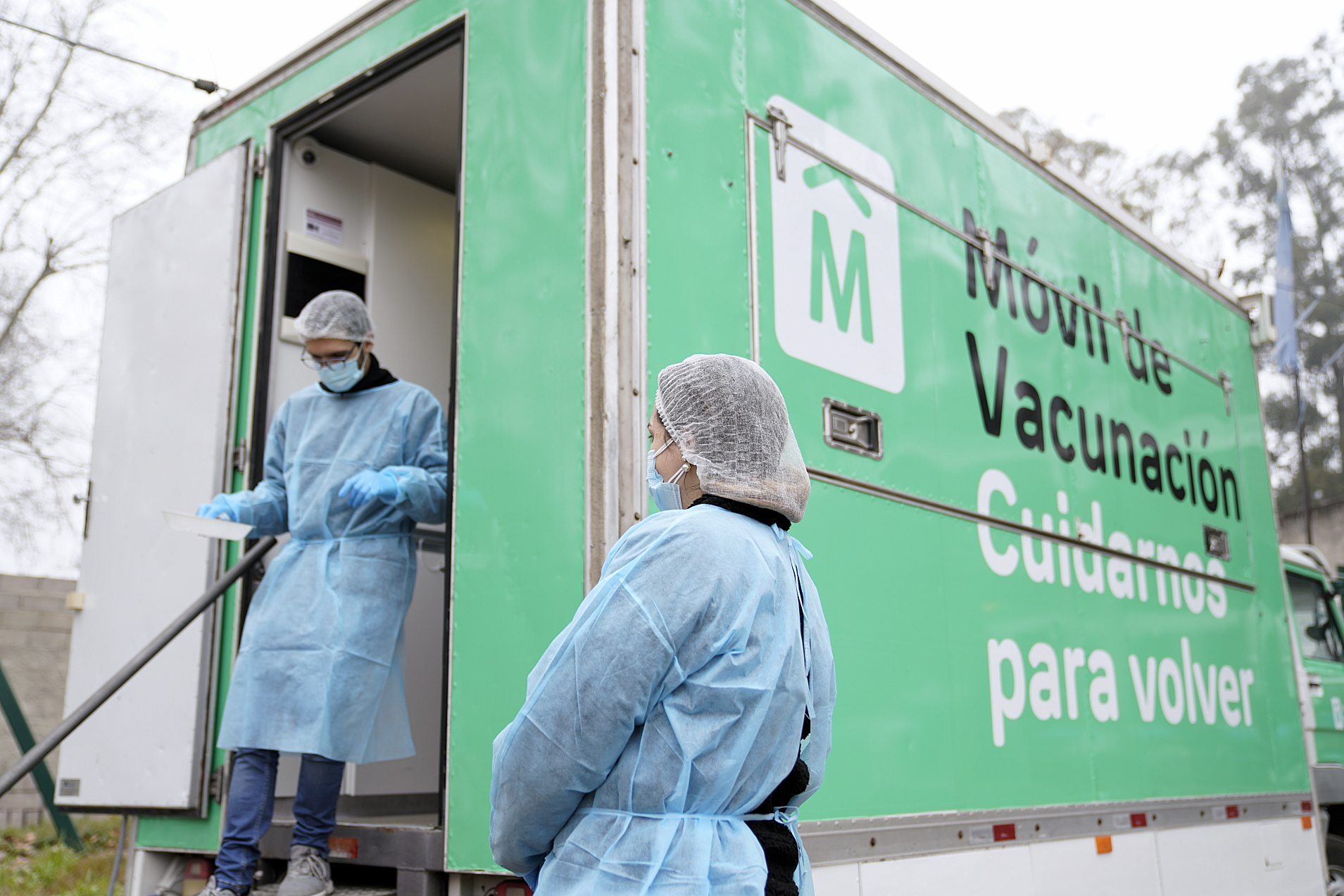
Mobile vaccination unit

The first batch of 192,000 doses of CoronaVac arrived on 25 February 2021. Vaccinations began on 1 March, being active workers, under 60, from the field of education, the Institute for Children and Adolescents, the police, the Armed Forces, firefighters and customs officials of airports, ports and dry borders, the first to be inoculated. Vaccinations were expanded to those between 55 and 59 years of age on 8 March 2021.

The first batch of 50,000 Pfizer–BioNTech vaccine arrived on 10 March 2021. Vaccinations to healthcare personnel and prison population began on 12 March. On 16 March, vaccination began in nursing homes. On the same day a large batch of 1,558,000 doses of Coronavac arrived. A day later, on 17 March, 51,000 doses of the Pfizer–BioNTech vaccine arrived.

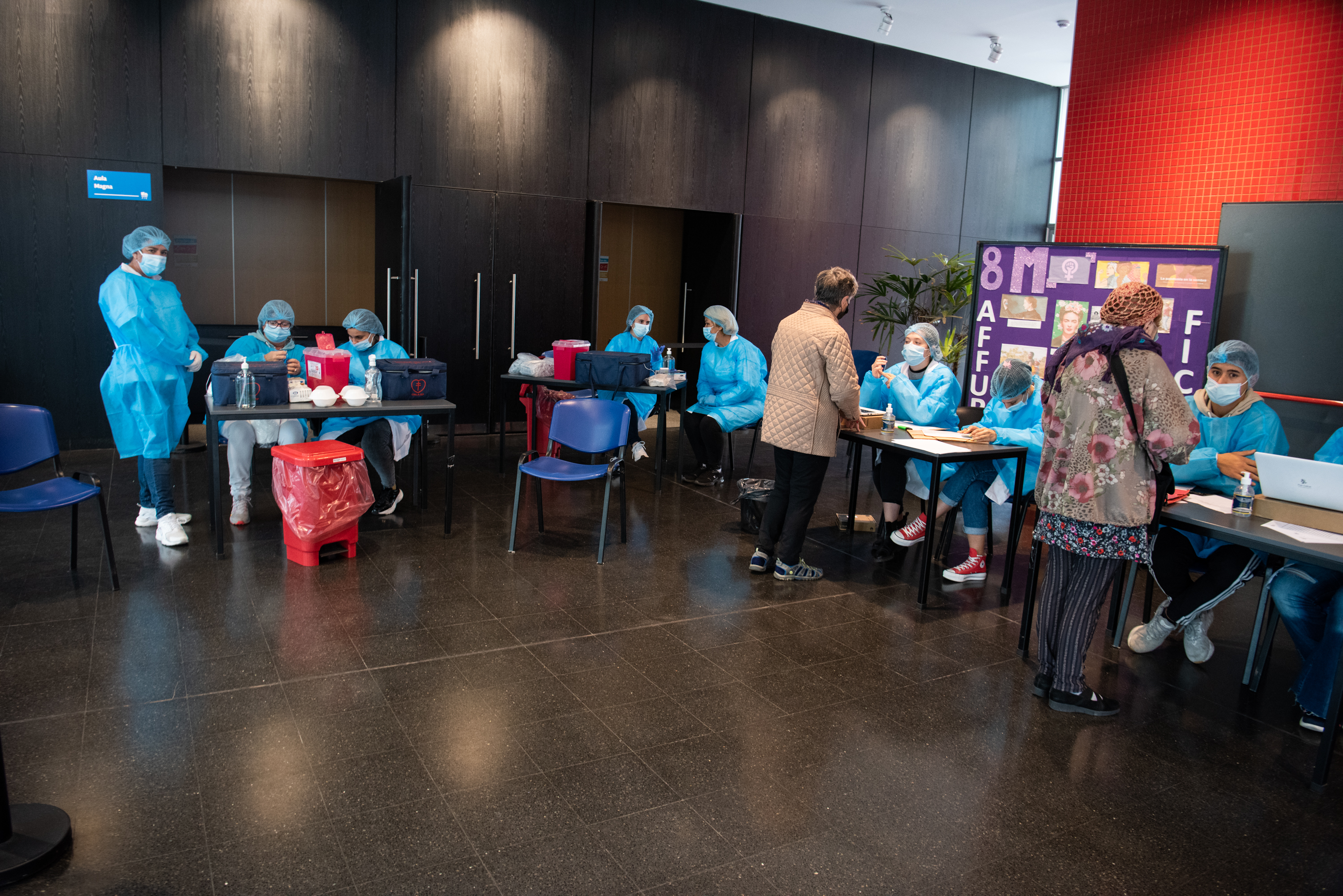
Vaccination center set up at the Faculty of Information and Communication, University of the Republic.

Vaccinations were expanded to those between 50 and 70 who reside in cities bordering Brazil on 15 March 2021, to those of the same age group in the rest of the country on 18 March 2021, and to those over 80 on 22 March 2021. From March 29 to April 2, within a special period, 170,000 people between the ages of 18 and 70 were vaccinated. Vaccinations became available to those between 70 and 79 on 10 April, to those between 18 and 30 on 1 June, to 12-17 year olds on 9 June 2021, and to those between 05 and 11 on 12 January 2022.

A third vaccination for immunosuppressed people, and those vaccinated with CoronaVac was approved by the government on 28 July 2021. As of August 24, over 2,600,000 people (75% of the population) have received the first dose of the vaccine, and over 2,480,200 (70%) are fully vaccinated.

== Statistics ==
The charts show the development of the pandemic starting from 13 March 2020, representing changes in net number of cases on a daily basis, based on the number of cases reported in the National Emergency System's daily reports.

=== Confirmed COVID-19 cases in Uruguay by department ===
Confirmed COVID-19 cases in Uruguay by department as of 27 August 2021.
Department	Confirmed cases	Recovered cases	Confirmed deaths
Montevideo	180,114	176,526	2,978
Canelones	57,576	56,667	706
Rivera	12,551	12,305	198
Salto	15,190	14,846	302
Maldonado	17,105	16,857	196
San José	12,420	12,255	144
Tacuarembó	11,479	11,312	164
Paysandú	12,452	12,229	177
Colonia	10,419	10,213	170
Cerro Largo	8,894	8,698	173
Artigas	9,185	9,018	150
Soriano	7,563	7,364	180
Río Negro	6,182	6,045	131
Florida	5,898	5,816	79
Durazno	4,332	4,247	76
Rocha	4,803	4,714	73
Treinta y Tres	3,734	3,640	84
Lavalleja	3,221	3,185	29
Flores	1,413	1,393	16
Total	384,531	377,330	6,026

== See also ==
- COVID-19 pandemic by country and territory
- COVID-19 pandemic in South America
- GACH
