= Hermon Dowling =

British physician

- Born: Northern Ireland
- Education: Campbell College
- Alma mater: Queen's University of Belfast; Royal Postgraduate Medical School
- Occupation: Gastroenterologist
- Employers: Royal Victoria Hospital, Belfast; Boston University Medical Center; Hammersmith Hospital; University of London

Hermon Dowling is a British physician and a past president of the British Society of Gastroenterology.

Dowling was born in Northern Ireland, attended Campbell College, and graduated from Queen's University of Belfast in 1959.

After holding junior and academic posts at the Royal Victoria Hospital, Belfast under Professor Sir Graham Bull, he undertook further training in gastroenterology, at the Royal Postgraduate Medical School under Professor Sir Christopher Booth. He subsequently worked at Boston University Medical Center as a Medical Research Council/Wellcome Travelling Fellow. In 1968, he took up a post as a consultant at Hammersmith Hospital.

In 1974, he was appointed to the first Chair of Gastroenterology in the University of London at Guy's Hospital campus, which was part of the United Medical and Dental Schools of Guy's and St Thomas' Hospitals from 1982 to 1998. His research programme included studies of intestinal adaptation, gallstones and bile acids.

He was elected president of the British Society of Gastroenterology for the 1996-1997 period, and served as president of the European Society for Clinical Investigation and as the founding Secretary of the United European Gastroenterology Federation.
