= Fernando Paganini =

Uruguayan control theorist

Fernando G. Paganini is a Uruguayan control theorist from the Universidad ORT Uruguay.

== Education and career ==
Paganini earned an electrical engineering degree and a licenciate in mathematics in 1990 from the University of the Republic (Uruguay). He came to the California Institute of Technology for graduate study in electrical engineering, earning a master's degree in 1992 and completing his Ph.D. in 1996. After postdoctoral research at the Massachusetts Institute of Technology he became an assistant professor at the University of California, Los Angeles in 1997, earned tenure there, and remained there as a faculty member until 2005, when he returned to Uruguay as a professor at Universidad ORT Uruguay. In 2019 he became vice dean for research at the university.

In April 2020, Paganini was appointed a member of the GACH, an advisory committee created by President Luis Lacalle Pou to define methods and studies to advise the government regarding the COVID-19 pandemic in Uruguay. He shared the group with Dr. Rafael Radi, the first Uruguayan scientist at the National Academy of Sciences of the United States and president of the National Academy of Sciences of Uruguay; and Dr. Henry Cohen, President of the National Academy of Medicine and awarded as a Master by the World Gastroenterology Organisation in 2019.

== Book ==
With Geir E. Dullerud, Paganini is a coauthor of the book A Course in Robust Control Theory: A Convex Approach (Texts in Applied Mathematics 36, Springer, 2005).

== Recognition ==
Paganini was named an IEEE Fellow in 2014 "for contributions to robust control and communication networks". He is also a member of the National Academy of Sciences of Uruguay, the National Academy of Engineering of Uruguay, and the Latin American Academy of Science.
