= List of international presidential trips made by Luis Lacalle Pou =

Trips made by 42nd Uruguayan president

Luis Lacalle Pou, the 42nd president of Uruguay, has made 25 international trips to five countries during his Presidency so far, which began with his inauguration.

== Summary ==
The number of visits per country where President Lacalle Pou traveled are:

- One: Belgium, China, Democratic Republic of Congo, the Dominican Republic, France, Mexico, Paraguay, Qatar, the United Arab Emirates, the United Kingdom
- Two: Chile
- Three: Brazil
- Four: United States
- Five: Argentina

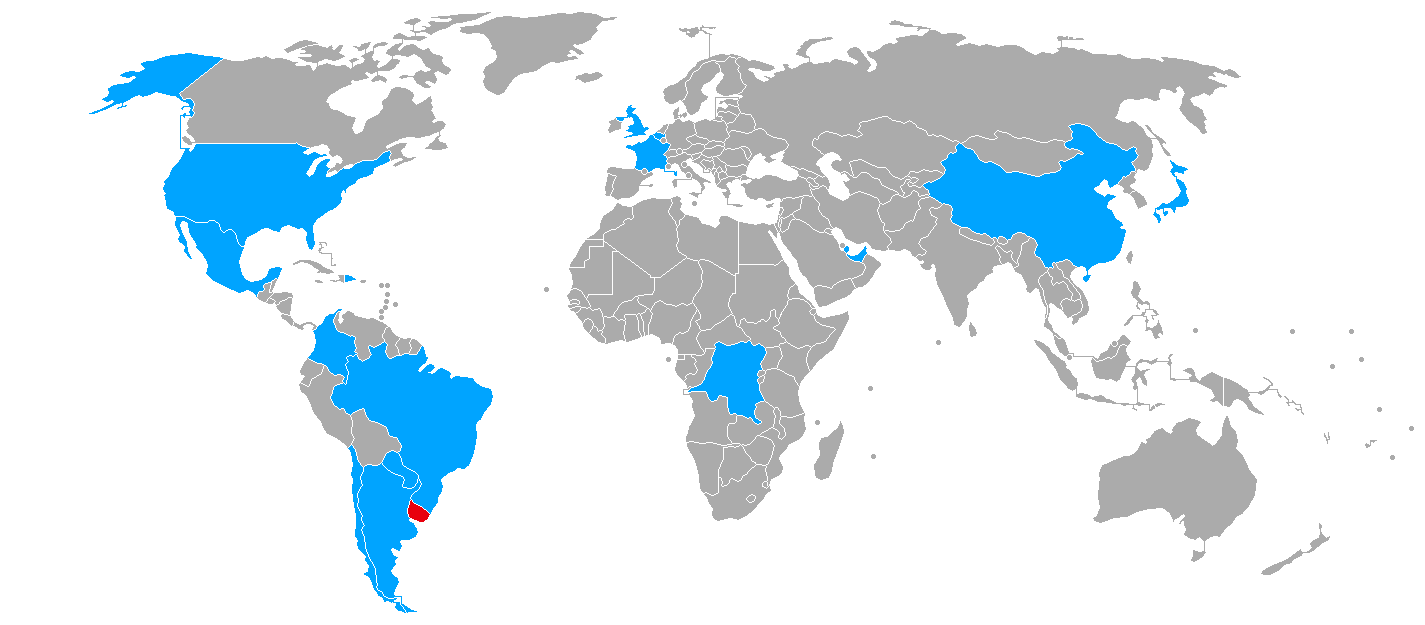
Countries visited by Lacalle Pou during his presidency (in light blue) and Uruguay (in red).

== 2021 ==
| Country | Areas visited | Date(s) | Details |
|---|---|---|---|
| Brazil | Brasília | 3 February | Met with President Jair Bolsonaro. |
| Argentina | Buenos Aires | 13 August | Met with President Alberto Fernández. |
| Mexico | Mexico City | 18 September | Attended the 6th Summit of Heads of State and Government of the Community of Latin American and Caribbean States. |
| United States | New York City | 21–22 September | Address to the 76th Session of the United Nations General Assembly. |
| Qatar | Doha | 12–13 December | Met with Emir Tamim bin Hamad Al Thani and other authorities. |
| Democratic Republic of Congo | Goma | 24–25 December | Visited the Uruguayan detachment of MONUSCO and celebrated Christmas. |

== 2022 ==
| Country | Areas visited | Date(s) | Details |
|---|---|---|---|
| United Arab Emirates | Dubai | 18–23 February | Celebrated Uruguay's National Day at Expo 2020. |
| Chile | Santiago | 11 March | Attended the inauguration of President Gabriel Boric. |
| Paraguay | Asunción | 14–15 May | Attended the celebrations for the 211th Anniversary of the Independence of Paraguay. |
| United Kingdom | London | 22–25 May | Met with Prime Minister Boris Johnson, and with Prince Charles. Also gave a lecture at Canning House. |
| Colombia | Bogotá | 30 June–4 July | Met with President Iván Duque. |
| Japan | Tokyo | 25–30 October | Met with Prime Minister Fumio Kishida and Emperor Naruhito. Also participated in the business forum organized by JETRO to seek to increase trade and investment. |

== 2023 ==
| Country | Areas visited | Date(s) | Details |
|---|---|---|---|
| Brazil | Brasília | 1 January | Attended the inauguration of President Luiz Inácio Lula da Silva. |
| Argentina | Buenos Aires | 24 January | Attended the VII Summit of Heads of State and Government of the Community of Latin American and Caribbean States. |
| Dominican Republic | Santo Domingo | 24–29 March | Attended the XXVIII Ibero-American Summit of Heads of State and Government. Also met with Chilean President Gabriel Boric and Spanish King Felipe VI. |
| Brazil | Brasília | 30 May | Attended summit of South American presidents. |
| United States | New York City and Washington, D.C. | 11–15 June | Attended the Foro Americas Society/Council of Americas Gold Insigne distinction ceremony and met with President Joe Biden. |
| Argentina | Puerto Iguazú | 4 July | Attended the Summit of Presidents of the Southern Common Market. |
| Belgium | Brussels | 17–18 July | Attended the Southern Common Market-European Union summit. |
| Chile | Santiago | 11 September | Attended the event for the 50th Anniversary of the 1973 Coup d'état. |
| France | Lille | 14 September | Met with President Emmanuel Macron and attended the Uruguay national rugby union team's match against France at the 2023 World Cup. |
| United States | New York City | 19–23 September | Address to the 78th Session of the United Nations General Assembly. |
| United States | Washington, D.C. | 3–4 November | Attended the Americas Partnership for Economic Prosperity Summit and met with President Joe Biden. |
| China | Beijing | 18–25 November | Met with Chairman Xi Jinping for FTA and signing of agricultural trade agreements. |
| Argentina | Buenos Aires | 10 December | Attended the inauguration of President Javier Milei. |

== 2024 ==
| Country | Areas visited | Date(s) | Details |
|---|---|---|---|
| Argentina | Bariloche | 17 April | Attended the exclusive "Foro Llao Llao" event in the Llao Llao hotel in Bariloche. |
| Argentina | Buenos Aires | 24 April | Attended the "Fundacion Libertad" meeting in Buenos Aires. |

== See also ==
- Foreign relations of Uruguay
