= Emad El-Omar =

British gastroenterologist

Emad Munir El-Omar (born 23 July 1962) is a British physician and gastroenterologist who chairs the department of medicine at the University of New South Wales and is the editor in chief of The BMJ's Gut academic journal.

== Education ==
El-Omar studied medicine at the University of Glasgow where he trained as a gastroenterologist.

== Career ==
El-Omar is the chair of the medicine department at the University of New South Wales's St George & Sutherland Clinical School and the director of the university's microbiome research centre, which he helped create. He is the editor in chief of Gut academic journal.

He has been a visiting scholar and a visiting scientist at Vanderbilt University, and the National Cancer Institute, and was previously employed as a professor of gastroenterology at the University of Aberdeen from 2000 to 2016.

== Personal life ==
El-Omar is British, and lives in Australia.
