= Liceo Francés Jules Supervielle =

Lycée Français Jules Supervielle

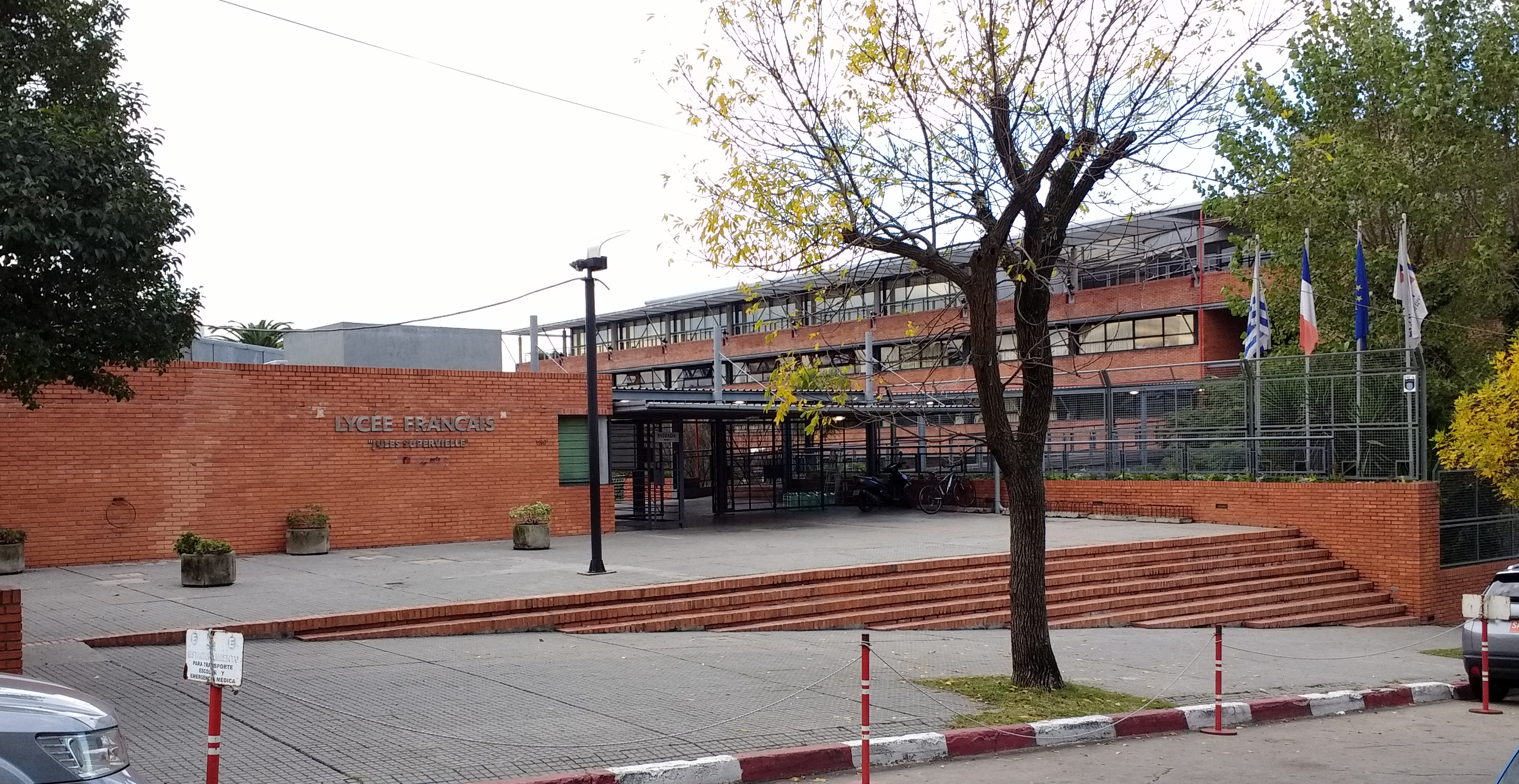
- Lycée Français in 2017.

Location
- Benigno Paiva 1160, 11300, Montevideo, Uruguay; 34.9039°S 56.1294°W

Information
- Other name: Liceo Francés Jules Supervielle
- Type: Private, bilingual
- Established: 1897
- Grades: K-12
- Colors: blue, red, white
- Website: lf.edu.uy

Lycée Français Jules Supervielle (Spanish: Liceo Francés Jules Supervielle) is a French private school. It is located at Benigno Paiva 1160, in Buceo, Montevideo, Uruguay.

It was originally established in 1897 with the name of Collège Carnot. In September 2001 it was renamed after the French-Uruguayan writer Jules Supervielle. The French government owned the land which houses the school, while the nonprofit organization Sociedad Francesa de Enseñanza (SFE, French: Société Française d'Enseignement de Montevideo) operates the school.

== History ==
By 2015 the French government and the Sociedad Francesa de Enseñanza engaged in a political conflict regarding the operation of the school. The French Ambassador, Sylvain Itte, sent a letter to parents stating that France may discontinue support of the school on 1 August 2015. If the French government decided to sever its relationship, it would take control of the building and expel the school from it, as well as end its three million euro support. The Uruguayan government became involved, trying to establish a truce between the parties. The Uruguayan government directly contacted the French embassy, and Uruguayan Minister of Education Juan Pedro Mir established contact with SFE president Bernardo Supervielle. The SFE and the French government reached an agreement, keeping the relationship intact.

On the 6th of October 2017, the school became 120 years old.

== Academics ==
The students learn French, Spanish, and English and the school has an emphasis on languages. The Sección Europea (European Section), an extracurriculum programme, uses mathematics and literature to give additional English instruction.

== Student body ==
As of 2015 there were 1,900 students. About 200 students had scholarships covering 50%-100% of the tuition.

== Notable pupils ==
- Henry Cohen Engelman – physician and academic
- Perla Estable – architect.
- Manuel Flores Mora – politician.
- Carlos Maggi – intellectual.
- Guido Manini Ríos – military general and politician.
- Alberto Methol Ferré – writer, journalist, historian, philosopher and theologist.
- Jorge Peirano Facio – jurist, banker and politician.
- Antonio Pena – sculptor.
- Laura Raffo – economist and politician
- Osiris Rodríguez Castillos – poet, writer, researcher and composer.
- Emir Rodríguez Monegal – scholar.
- Arturo Scarone – researcher, journalist and writer.
- Estanislao Valdés Otero – lawyer and politician.
