= Henry Cohen Engelman =

Uruguayan physician

Henry Cohen
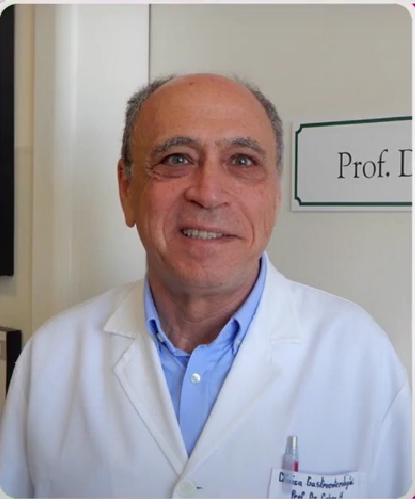
- Born: November 29, 1954 (age 71); Montevideo, Uruguay
- Education: University of the Republic
- Occupations: Physician; academic; lecturer
- Board member of: GACH
- Children: 2

Henry Cohen Engelman (born 19 November 1954) is a Uruguayan gastroenterologist, academic and lecturer, who is currently head of the Department of Gastroenterology at the Hospital Clinic Manuel Quintela of the University of the Republic. From 2011 to 2013, he served as president of the World Gastroenterology Organisation, becoming the first Latin American to hold the position.

== Early life and education ==
Cohen Engelman was born in Montevideo in 1954, into a Jewish family. His parents were the first generation of Uruguayans in their respective families. His paternal grandfather was originally from Alexandria and had settled in Istanbul, where he met his wife before both immigrated to Uruguay in the 1920s. His maternal family is originally from Poland.

He attended the Liceo Francés Jules Supervielle in Montevideo and studied medicine at the University of the Republic, from which he graduated in 1981. Subsequently, he pursued postgraduate studies and specializations in gastroenterology and was awarded a scholarship to specialize in abdominal ultrasound at Juntendo University in Japan.

== Career ==
After completing his specialization in gastroenterology in 1984, he began working at the Hospital Clinic Manuel Quintela. In 2004, he was appointed professor and head of the Department of Gastroenterology at the University of the Republic. In September 2008, he joined the National Academy of Medicine as a full member. From 2009 to 2011, he served as Vice President of the World Gastroenterology Organisation, and from 2011 to 2013, he served as its President. In 2014, he received the International Leadership Award from the American College of Gastroenterology.

From March 2018 to 2019, he served as president of the National Academy of Medicine. In 2019 he received the Master of the World Gastroenterology Organisation Award. In 2020, he was invited by President Luis Lacalle Pou to join the Honorary Scientific Advisory Group (GACH), the government's advisory committee for the response to the COVID-19 pandemic.

In 2021, he was appointed as a Foreign Honorary Member of the Academy of Medicine of Buenos Aires, and in 2023, he was appointed professor emeritus of the Faculty of Medicine of the University of the Republic.

Cohen is the physician overseeing the ECHO Project (an acronym for Extension for Community Healthcare Outcomes), a collaborative initiative between the University of the Republic and the University of New Mexico. This program seeks to establish “communities of practice” focused on clinical topics through tele-mentoring, with the objective of training healthcare teams in the management of complex diseases.

== Personal life ==
He is married to an opera singer, with whom he has two children, Pablo and Lucía.
