= Gut (journal) =

Monthly peer-reviewed medical journal

- Discipline: Gastroenterology, hepatology
- Language: English
- Edited by: William Grady, Thomas Rösch, Matias Avila

Publication details
- History: 1960–present
- Publisher: BMJ Group
- Frequency: Monthly
- Open access: Hybrid
- Impact factor: 24.6 (2025)

Standard abbreviations
- ISO 4: Gut

Indexing
- CODEN: GUTTAK
- ISSN: 0017-5749 (print); 1468-3288 (web)
- OCLC no.: 01641120

Links
- Journal homepage; Online access

Gut is a monthly peer-reviewed medical journal on gastroenterology and hepatology. It is the journal of the British Society of Gastroenterology and is published by BMJ. As of 2010, the editor-in-chief is Emad El-Omar.

Gut was established in 1960 and covers original research on the gastrointestinal tract, liver, pancreas, and biliary tract. The journal has annual supplements covering the presentations from the British Society of Gastroenterology Annual General Meeting. British Society of Gastroenterology clinical practice guidelines are also published as supplements to the journal. As of March 2010, subscribers to Gut also receive a copy of Frontline Gastroenterology.

== Abstracting and indexing ==
Gut is abstracted and indexed by Medline, Science Citation Index, Current Contents/Clinical Medicine, Current Contents/Life Sciences, Excerpta Medica, BIOSIS Previews and Scopus. According to the Journal Citation Reports, its 2023 impact factor is 23.1, ranking it fifth out of 143 journals in the category "Gastroenterology and Hepatology".

=== Highly cited articles ===
According to the Web of Science, some highly cited articles in Gut are:

1. Eaden JA, Abrams KR, Mayberry JF (2001). "The risk of colorectal cancer in ulcerative colitis: a meta-analysis". Gut. 48 (4). BMJ Group: 526–535. doi:10.1136/gut.48.4.526. PMC 1728259. PMID 11247898.
2. Schlemper RJ, Riddell RH, Kato Y, Borchard F, Cooper HS, Dawsey SM, Dixon MF, Fenoglio-Preiser CM, Flejou JF, Geboes K, Hattori T, Hirota T, Itabashi M, Iwafuchi M, Iwashita A, Kim YI, Kirchner T, Klimpfinger M, Koike M, Lauwers GY, Lewin KJ, Oberhuber G, Offner F, Price AB, Rubio CA, Shimizu M, Shimoda T, Sipponen P, Solcia E, Stolte M, Watanabe H, Yamabe H (2000). "The Vienna classification of gastrointestinal epithelial neoplasia". Gut. 47 (2). BMJ Group: 251–255. doi:10.1136/gut.47.2.251. PMC 1728018. PMID 10896917.
3. Ono H, Kondo H, Gotoda T, Shirao K, Yamaguchi H, Saito D, Hosokawa K, Shimoda T, Yoshida S (2001). "Endoscopic mucosal resection for treatment of early gastric cancer". Gut. 48 (2). BMJ Group: 225–229. doi:10.1136/gut.48.2.225. PMC 1728193. PMID 11156645.
