= British Society of Gastroenterology =

Coordinates: 51°31′30.76″N 0°8′42.45″W

The British Society of Gastroenterology (BSG) is a British professional organisation of gastroenterologists, surgeons, pathologists, radiologists, scientists, nurses, dietitians and others amongst its members, which number over 4,000. It was founded in 1937, and is a registered charity. Its offices are in Regent's Park, London.

The society is an organisation focused on the promotion of gastroenterology within the United Kingdom. It is involved with the training of gastroenterologists in the United Kingdom, and with original research into gastroenterology. The society also produces information for patients with gastrointestinal diseases.

The society publishes the medical journals Gut, BMJ Open Gastroenterology and Frontline Gastroenterology.

It produces clinical practice guidelines and various other documents relevant to the field of gastroenterology including diseases of the gastrointestinal tract, liver, pancreas and biliary tract, and the disciplines of gastrointestinal endoscopy, nutrition, pathology and gastrointestinal surgery.

The society holds an Annual General Meeting during which original research, updates and reviews in gastroenterology and hepatology are presented. Named lectures include the Sir Arthur Hurst lecture and the Sir Francis Avery Jones BSG Research medallist.

Recent presidents have been Hermon Dowling (1996–1997), Chris Hawkey (2010), Jon Rhodes (2011–12), Ian Gilmore (2013–14), Ian Forgacs (2014–16), Martin Lombard (2016–18), Cathryn Edwards (2018–20), Alastair McKinlay (2020–22), and Andy Veitch (2022–24). The current president is Professor Colin Rees.

The British Society of Gastroenterology is a National Society Member of the United European Gastroenterology.
