= United European Gastroenterology =

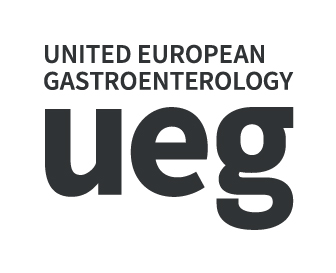
- Founded: 1992
- Type: Non-profit organisation
- Location: Vienna, Austria
- Members: 17 Specialist Member Societies, 50 National Gastroenterology Societies
- Key people: Matthias Löhr – President (2024–2025)
- Website: ueg.eu

The United European Gastroenterology (UEG) is a non-profit organisation combining European societies concerned with digestive health.

== About ==
Founded in 1992 United European Gastroenterology (UEG) is the leading non-profit organisation for excellence in digestive health in Europe and beyond with its headquarters in Vienna.

We improve the prevention and care of digestive diseases in Europe through providing top tier education, supporting research and advancing clinical standards. As Europe’s home and umbrella for multidisciplinary gastroenterology, we unite over 50,000 engaged professionals from national and specialist societies, individual digestive health experts and related scientists from all fields and career stages.

== Structure ==
UEG unites 17 Specialist Member Societies and 50 National Societies working in the broad area of digestive health, constantly adapting to the changing requirements of scientific research and health care.

Following our mission and a dedicated strategic plan, the overall leadership and strategic direction of UEG rests with the Council. The committees and task forces enable interested volunteers to play an active role in shaping current and future UEG initiatives and form the operating body of the organisation.

Member Societies are represented in the Meeting of Members that elects or appoints UEG Council members. Each Specialist Member Society has the opportunity to send one representative to UEG’s committees.

All officers of UEG, regardless of position, provide their effort and time on a complete voluntary basis, and therefore make UEG a non-profit organisation concerned solely with the well-being of patients.

UEG is a Regional Affiliate Association of the World Gastroenterology Organisation. UEG is a member of the European Medicines Agency, the Biomedical Alliance in Europe, the AC Forum, the Optimal Nutritional Care for All, and Pancreatic Cancer Europe.

Presidents of UEG:

- 2024–2025: Matthias Löhr
- 2022–2023: Helena Cortez-Pinto
- 2020–2021: Axel Dignaß
- 2018–2019: Paul Fockens
- 2016–2017: Michael Manns

== Headquarters ==
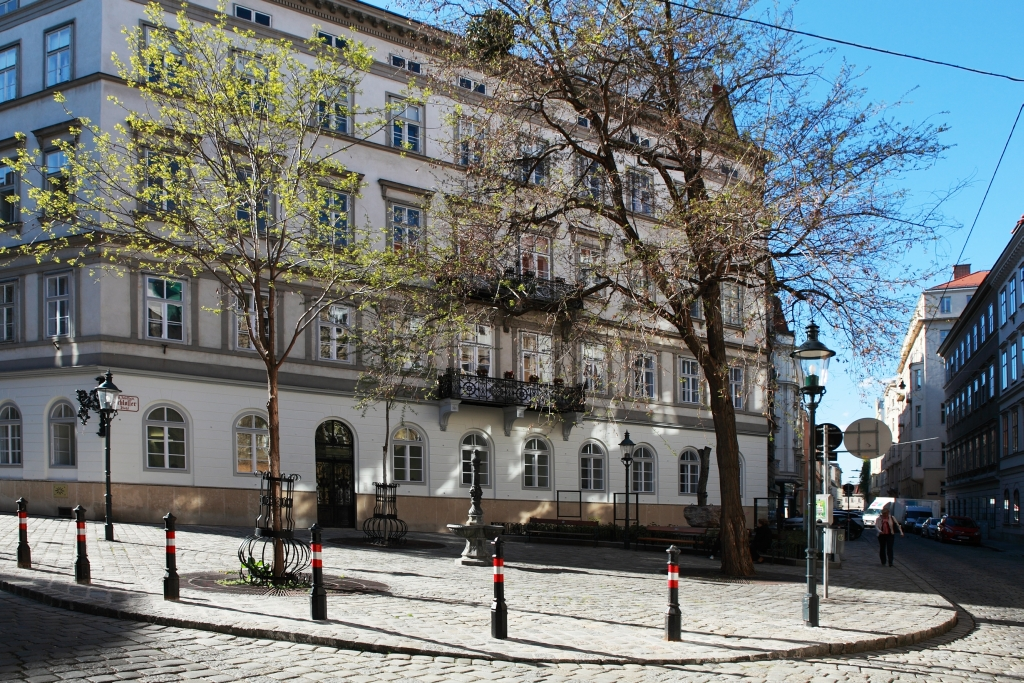
United European Gastroenterology Headquarters

The House of European Gastroenterology (HEG) is UEG's home and offers a meeting point and communication hub to the European gastroenterological community. The HEG is situated in the heart of Vienna, near the Rathaus (City Hall) in a 19th-century building.

== Activities ==
=== UEG Week ===
UEG Week is the largest congress of its kind in Europe and is held once a year. It has been running since 1992 and now attracts more than 10,000 people from around the world. It features the latest advances in clinical management and research in the field of digestive health. A two-day Postgraduate Teaching Programme is also held on occasion of UEG Week. The programme provides continuing medical education for gastroenterologists in training and practice.

=== Education ===
UEG provides educational online and face-to-face courses, a podcast and webinars in the field of digestive health.

Additionally Gutflix, UEG's interactive and personalised GI learning platform, provides all educational content in one place. Gutflix includes UEG Week recordings, online courses, clinical practice guidelines, webinars, "Mistakes in..." articles, podcasts, webinars and more.

=== UEG EU Affairs ===
UEG aims to act as a united voice of European gastroenterology in the Institutions of the European Union and the governments of the member states in order to promote digestive health in Europe.

=== Awards and grants ===
UEG offers fellowships, awards and grants in the following fields and categories: Fellowships and awards for researchers under the age of 40, a prize for researchers having achieved the highest level of international recognition, an award honouring outstanding contributions to digestive health and UEG, national as well as international scholarship awards, prizes for best abstracts, an award to recognise the first named author of the best original scientific research published in UEG Journal and travel grants.

== Notable publications ==
=== UEG Journal ===
Focuses on providing coverage of both translational as well as clinical studies from different fields of gastroenterology. The latest impact factor ranking indicates that the UEG Journal has already established itself as an authoritative, high quality and trusted journal in the field.

=== UEG White Book 2 ===
UEG's latest pan-European study on digestive health where the burden of digestive diseases and associated research gaps are highlighted.
