= World Gastroenterology Organisation =

- Founded: 1958, United States
- Type: Non-governmental organization
- Purpose: Training, education, awareness
- Region served: International
- Website: worldgastroenterology.org wgofoundation.org

The World Gastroenterology Organisation (WGO) is an international federation of over 100 national GI societies and 4 regional associations of gastroenterology representing over 50,000 individual members.

WGO is focused on "the improvement of standards in gastroenterology training and education on a global scale".

The association was founded in 1935 and incorporated in 1958. The WGO was originally known as the Organisation Mondiale de Gastroenterologie (OMGE) and was renamed the World Gastroenterology Organisation in 2006.

Its activities include educational initiatives such as Training Centers, Train the Trainers Workshops, public awareness campaigns such as World Digestive Health Day and Global Guidelines which cascade, providing viable solutions which are adaptable to varying resource levels around the world, as well as a quadrennial World Congress of Gastroenterology.

The WGO Foundation was incorporated in 2007 and is dedicated to raising funds to support the ongoing WGO education initiatives and activities.

== History ==
Georges Brohée (1887–1957), a Belgian surgeon who promoted modern gastroenterology, is largely responsible for the origin of the WGO, in particular by founding the Belgian Society of Gastroenterology in 1928 and by organizing the first International Congress of Gastroenterology in Brussels in 1935. In May 1958 the first World Congress of Gastroenterology was held in Washington DC, where Georges Brohée’s continuing efforts culminated in the constitution of the "Organisation Mondiale de Gastro-entérologie" (OMGE) on May 29, 1958.

Dr H.L. Bockus was the organisation’s first President. His vision was to enhance standards of education and training in gastroenterology.

Developed nations were the initial focus of the organization, however today the WGO embraces a global approach with a special emphasis on developing regions

== Structure ==
General management of the WGO is conducted by a Governing Council. Acting through the Governing Council, the organisation is empowered to undertake those activities necessary to fulfill the goals and mission of the WGO.

The Executive Committee oversees various program and consists of the President, Vice President, Past President, Secretary General, and Treasurer.

A General Assembly reviews and approves the work of the Governing Council and attends to other business (including the World Congress venue). The General Assembly is composed of representatives from all WGO Member Societies and regional associations. Each WGO Member Society has one vote in the General Assembly.

WGO has a number of committees including:

- Finance Committee
- WGO Guidelines and Publications Committee
- Nominations Committee
- Education & Training Committee
- Editorial Board

The elections and renewal of the WGO officers and committees takes place on the occasion of the General Assembly, which is held during the quadrennial World Congress of Gastroenterology.

== Activities ==
=== Educational initiatives ===
==== Training centers ====
There are currently 20 WGO Training Centers:

- Bangkok, Thailand
- Bogotá, Colombia
- Cairo, Egypt
- Karachi, Pakistan
- La Paz, Bolivia
- La Plata, Argentina
- Mexico City, Mexico
- Rabat, Morocco
- Rome, Italy
- Santiago, Chile
- Soweto, South Africa
- Suva, Fiji
- San José, Costa Rica
- Porto Alegre, Brazil
- Ankara, Turkey
- Lagos, Nigeria
- Khartoum, Sudan
- Xi'an, China
- Porto, Portugal
- New Delhi, India

=== Global Guidelines and Cascades ===
Each guideline is translated into six languages including English, French, Spanish, Portuguese, Russian and Mandarin Chinese.

Guidelines with cascades:

- Acute diarrhea
- Colorectal cancer screening
- Constipation
- Endoscope Disinfection
- Esophageal varices
- Helicobacter pylori in developing countries
- Hepatitis B
- Hepatocellular carcinoma: a global perspective
- Inflammatory bowel disease: a global perspective
- Irritable bowel syndrome: a global perspective
- Obesity
- Radiation protection in the endoscopy suite

Guidelines with cascades in development:

- Asymptomatic Gallstone Disease
- Celiac Disease
- Diverticular Disease: Diverticulosis
- Dysphagia
- Management of acute viral hepatitis
- Management of Ascites Complicating Cirrhosis in Adults
- Management of Strongyloidiasis
- Probiotics and Prebiotics

=== Public awareness campaigns ===
==== World Digestive Health Day/Year ====
The WGO celebrates World Digestive Health Day (WDHD) every May 29, initiating a worldwide public health campaign through its national societies and 50,000 individual members. Each year, WDHD focuses upon a particular digestive disorder and seeks to increase general public awareness of prevention and therapy. WDHD themes have included:

- 2005: Health and Nutrition
- 2006: Helicobacter pylori infection
- 2007: Viral Hepatitis
- 2008: Optimal Nutrition in Health and Disease
- 2009: Irritable Bowel Syndrome (IBS)
- 2010: Inflammatory Bowel Disease (IBD)
- 2011: Enteric Infections: Prevention and Management – Clean Food, Clean Water, Clean Environment WDHD 2011
- 2012: From Heartburn to Constipation – Common GI Symptoms in the Community: Impact and Interpretation WDHD 2012
- 2013: LIVER CANCER: Act Today. Save Your Life Tomorrow. Awareness. Prevention. Detection. Treatment WDHD 2013
- 2014: Gut Microbes – Importance in Health and Disease WDHD 2014
- 2015: Heartburn: a Global Perspective WDHD 2015
- 2016: Diet and gut Health WDHD 2016

==== Advertising campaigns ====
In 2008, the WGO, together with Danone, launched a global campaign to improve digestive health, titled "Optimum Health and Nutrition." The campaign is part of a three-year partnership between WGO and Danone to "help raise awareness of digestive disorders and the importance of maintaining good digestive health."

== WGO Foundation ==
The WGO Foundation was established in 2007 to raise financial support to develop and sustain the World Gastroenterology Organisation's global training and education programs. These programs focus primarily on developing, low-resource countries and aim to meet the increasing demand for digestive disorder prevention and treatment worldwide.

=== Mission ===
To raise financial support to develop and sustain WGO's global training and education programs, especially in developing and low-resource countries.

=== Activities ===
The WGO Foundation has fund raising activities including Initiating fund raising campaigns:

- Global Mentor Fund
- World Digestive Health Day/Year
- Working in partnership programs with industry, philanthropic organizations etc...
- Appealing to health care, wellness and other business organizations for donations/pledges
- Applying for grants from international philanthropic organizations and public bodies
- Appealing to eminent physicians to support Mentor Scholar Awards for trainees from developing low-resource countries
- Appealing to our WGO membership of 50,000
- Appealing to the general public
