= List of Uruguayans =

Flag of Uruguay

Coat of Arms

Listed below are notable people from Uruguay.

== Artists ==
- Rodolfo Arotxarena
- Pablo Atchugarry
- José Belloni
- Juan Manuel Blanes
- Juan José Calandria
- Carlos Capelán
- Pedro Figari
- Carlos María Herrera
- Edward Johnston
- Carlos Páez Vilaró
- Virginia Patrone
- María Carmen Portela
- Hermenegildo Sábat
- Martín Sastre
- Felipe Seade
- Joaquín Torres García
- Daniel Pontet
- Eduardo Vernazza

== Vedettes, singers, actors, dancers and models ==
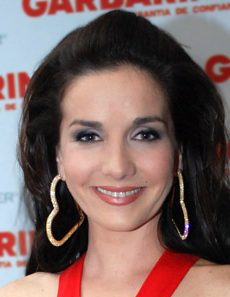
Natalia Oreiro

- Alicia Alfonso (born 1963) – actress
- Marcelo Buquet – actor and former model
- César Campodónico (1929–2005) – actor
- Eunice Castro – fashion-runway model, professional theater dancer, television and runway hostess and actress of stage and screen
- Mateo Chiarino (born 1983) – actor, writer, and director
- Mary da Cuña (1942–2016) – actress and theater director
- George DelHoyo – American theater and television actor, born in Canelones
- Virginia Dobrich – professional theater and television dancer
- Mónica Farro – theatrical supervedette, model and professional theater and television actress
- Tina Ferreira – carnival and theater vedette, dancer and journalist
- Delfi Galbiati – theatre actor
- Andrea Ghidone – vedette, fashion model, professional dancer and actress of theater and television
- Martha Gularte (1919–2002) – carnival and theater vedette, dancer and actress
- Daniel Hendler – film, television, and theatre actor
- Osvaldo Laport – film and television actor
- Laura Martínez (born 1964) – actress, dancer, television star
- María Mendive (born 1968) – actress and theater director
- Mónica Mesones – model and TV presenter
- Bárbara Mori – telenovela and film actress and model
- Natalia Oreiro – Latin Grammy-nominated singer, actress and fashion designer
- María Padín (1888–1970) – actress and producer
- Pelusa Vera (born 1940) – theater, radio, and television actress
- Imilce Viñas (1939–2009) – actress, comedian, teacher, and theater director
- China Zorrilla – award-winning theater, film and television actress

== Musicians ==
- Miguel del Aguila
- Jorge Drexler, Academy Award winner
- Enrique Graf
- Pablo Sciuto
- José Serebrier
- Alfredo Zitarrosa
- Edgardo Cambón
- Mariana Ingold
- Martín López
- Eduardo Mateo
- Martín Méndez
- Rubén Rada
- Jaime Roos
- Gabe Saporta
- Erwin Schrott
- Julio Sosa
- Daniel Viglietti
- Malena Muyala

== Politics and military ==
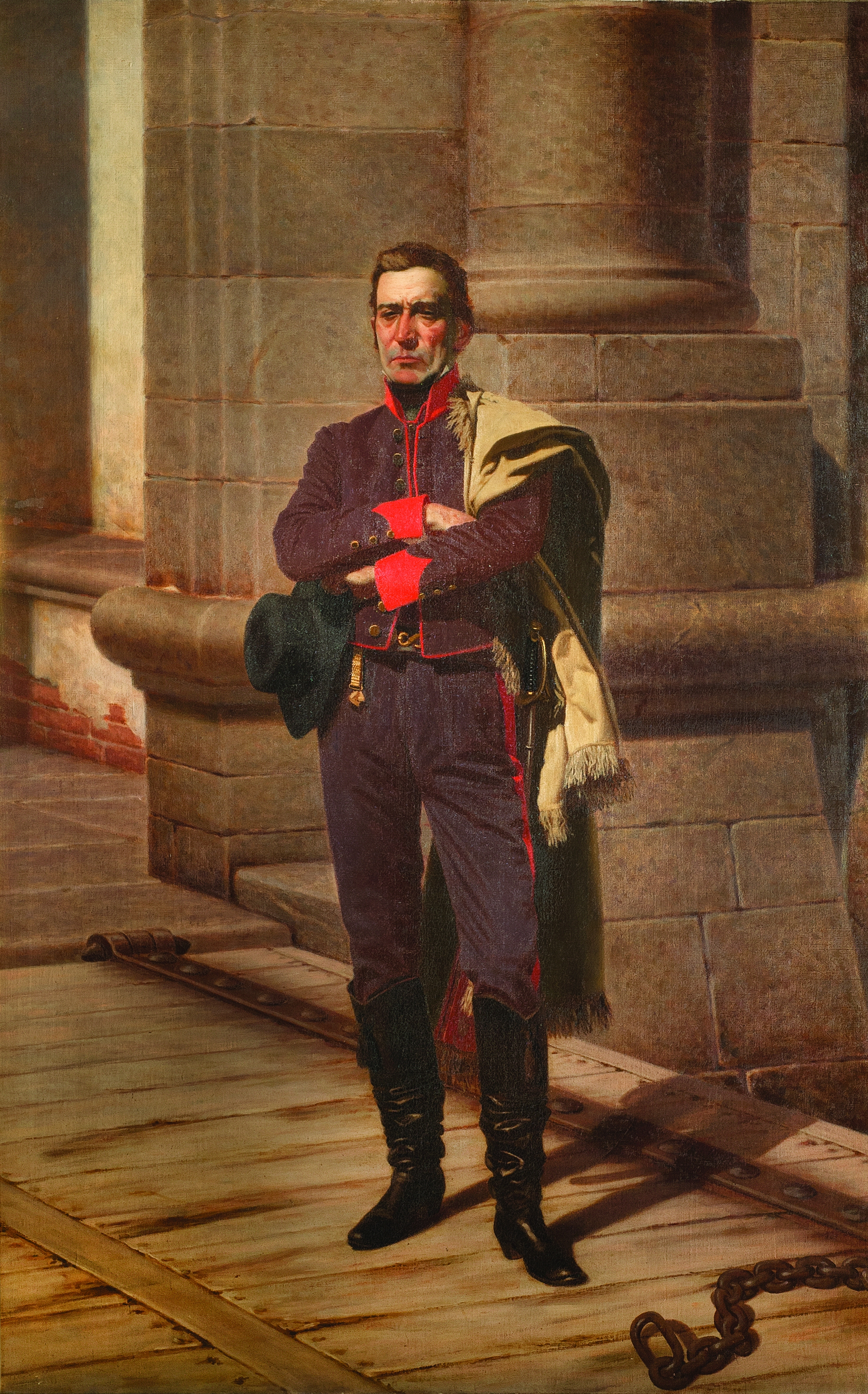
José Gervasio Artigas

- Gregorio Álvarez
- Juan José de Amézaga
- Mariano Arana
- Líber Arce (1938–1968), martyred student activist
- José Gervasio Artigas
- Danilo Astori
- Alfredo Baldomir
- Hugo Batalla
- Jorge Batlle
- José Batlle y Ordóñez
- Lorenzo Batlle
- Luis Batlle Berres
- Tomas Berreta
- Graciela Bianchi (born 1954), professor, politician, lawyer, notary
- Eduardo Blanco Acevedo
- Juan María Bordaberry
- Pedro Bordaberry
- Baltasar Brum
- Lorenzo Carnelli
- Juan Lindolfo Cuestas
- José Eugenio Ellauri
- Hugo Fernández Faingold
- Venancio Flores
- Emilio Frugoni
- Reinaldo Gargano
- Julio César Grauert
- Héctor Gutiérrez Ruiz
- Luis Alberto de Herrera
- Luis Alberto Lacalle
- Juan Antonio Lavalleja
- Aparicio Méndez
- Rafael Michelini
- Zelmar Michelini
- Martha Montaner (1955–2016), deputy and senator
- José Mujica
- Rodolfo Nin Novoa
- Didier Opertti Badan
- Manuel Oribe
- Jorge Pacheco Areco
- Susana Pintos (1939–1968), martyred student activist
- Fructuoso Rivera
- Julio María Sanguinetti
- Aparicio Saravia
- Raúl Sendic
- Joaquín Suárez
- Gabriel Terra
- Tabaré Vázquez
- Feliciano Viera

== Religious leaders ==
- Gonzalo Aemilius
- Antonio María Barbieri
- Pablo Galimberti
- José Benito Lamas
- Dámaso Antonio Larrañaga
- Juan Francisco Larrobla
- José Benito Monterroso
- Francisca Rubatto
- Juan Luis Segundo
- Mariano Soler
- Jacinto Vera

== Writers ==
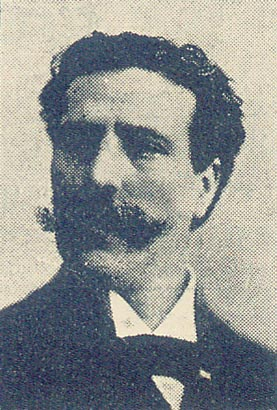
Eduardo Acevedo Díaz

- Eduardo Acevedo Díaz
- Francisco Acuña de Figueroa
- Delmira Agustini
- Pilar Barrios
- Mario Benedetti
- Amanda Berenguer
- Ruben Cotelo
- Juana de Ibarbourou
- Eduardo Galeano
- Marosa di Giorgio
- Julio Herrera y Reissig
- Jorge Majfud
- Eduardo Milán
- Juan Carlos Mondragón
- Juan Carlos Onetti, Cervantes Prize winner
- Emilio Oribe
- Cristina Peri Rossi
- Teresa Porzecanski
- Manuel Pérez y Curis
- Horacio Quiroga
- José Enrique Rodó
- María Herminia Sabbia y Oribe
- Florencio Sánchez
- Maria Eugenia Vaz Ferreira
- Idea Vilariño
- Javier de Viana
- Juan Zorrilla de San Martín

== Film directors and screenwriters ==
- Fede Álvarez
- Valeria Puig
- Juan Pablo Rebella
- Pablo Stoll
- Rodo Sayagues

== Public figures ==
- Irma Avegno (1881–1913), businesswoman
- Roberto Canessa
- Alberto Mechoso (1936–1976), anarchist
- Mariana Mota, judge
- Nando Parrado
- Gustavo Zerbino

== Indigenous people ==
- María Micaëla Guyunusa
- Laureano Tacuavé Martínez

== Engineers and architects ==
- Eladio Dieste
- Rosario Etchebarne
- Gonzalo Frasca
- Roman Fresnedo Siri
- Carlos Ott

== Educators ==
- Enriqueta Compte y Riqué (1866–1949), educational theorist
- María Stagnero de Munar (1856–1922), educational reformer and feminist
- Pablo Román Pérez Torres, Uruguayan translator and lecturer

== Journalists ==
- Susana Andrade (born 1963) – attorney, journalist, columnist, politician
- Clara Berenbau (1980–2013) – presenter, announcer, columnist, actress, writer, and journalist
- Dolores Castillo (1920–1991) – journalist, philosophy professor, and trade union activist
- Jorge Gestoso – Spanish-language television host and President of GTN, Gestoso Television News
- Pedro Sevcec – Spanish-language television news anchor for U.S. network Telemundo

== Composers ==
- Miguel del Aguila – (Grammy nominated classical composer)
- Jorge Drexler – Academy Award-winning song composer (The Motorcycle Diaries)
- Gerardo Matos Rodríguez – composer of the tango La Cumparsita
- Guido Santórsola
- Alfredo Zitarrosa

== Scientists ==
- Beatriz Álvarez Sanna (born 1968), biochemist
- Rodrigo Arocena
- Teresita de Barbieri, feminist sociologist, academic, and researcher
- José L. Duomarco
- Erna Frins (born 1960), physicist
- Rodolfo Gambini
- Gaston Gonnet
- Esmeralda Mallada (born 1937), astronomer
- José Luis Massera
- Mariana Meerhoff (born 1975), researcher, professor, and biologist
- Mario Wschebor

== Sports ==
=== Football ===
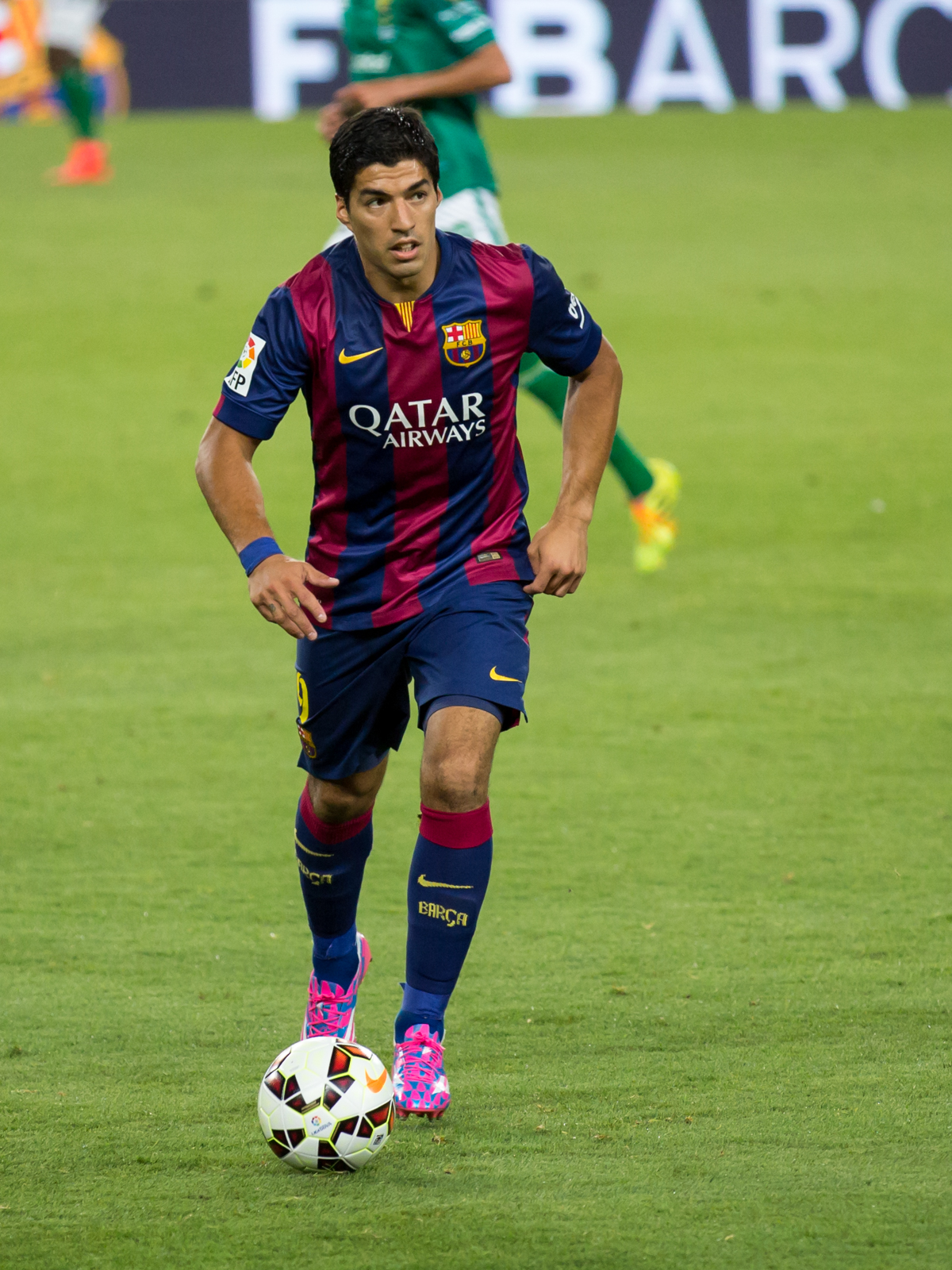
Luis Suárez

- Sebastián Abreu ("El Loco Abreu") – football player, member of national team
- José Andrade – former football player and member of the 1930 FIFA World Cup-winning team
- Felipe Avenatti – former football player
- Julio César Benítez Amodeo – Uruguayan football player, played seven seasons with Barcelona from 1961 to his sudden death in 1968
- Edinson Cavani – football player, member of national team and Manchester United
- Héctor Codevila – footballer
- César Falletti – football player, forward
- Diego Forlán – former football player, member of national team
- Enzo Francescoli – former football player, member of national team
- Alcides Ghiggia – former football player, member of the 1950 FIFA World Cup-winning team
- Diego Godín – football player, member of national team and Cagliari
- Wilson Graniolatti – former football player
- Carlos Grossmüller – former football player
- John Harley – played with C.U.R.C.C./Peñarol from 1909 until his retirement from football in 1920
- Luis Jonne – former football player, member of national team
- Gary Kagelmacher – football player, defender
- Marcelo Lipatin – football player, forward (Trofense)
- Diego Lugano – former football player, member of national team
- Francisco Majewski – former football player
- Juan Masnik – former football player
- Ladislao Mazurkiewicz – former football player
- Paolo Montero – former football player, member of the national team
- Fernando Muslera – football player, member of national team and Galatasaray
- José Nasazzi – former football player, captain of the 1930 FIFA World Cup-winning team
- Álvaro Recoba – football player, member of the national team
- Pedro Rocha – former football player, member of the national team
- Hugo Rivero – former football player
- Diego Rossi – football player, forward
- Juan Schiaffino – former football player, member of the 1950 FIFA World Cup-winning team
- Luis Suárez – football player, member of national team and member of Inter Miami
- Obdulio Varela – former football player, captain of the 1950 World Cup-winning team
- Matías Vitkieviez – former football player
- Gerardo Vonder – former football player

=== Others ===
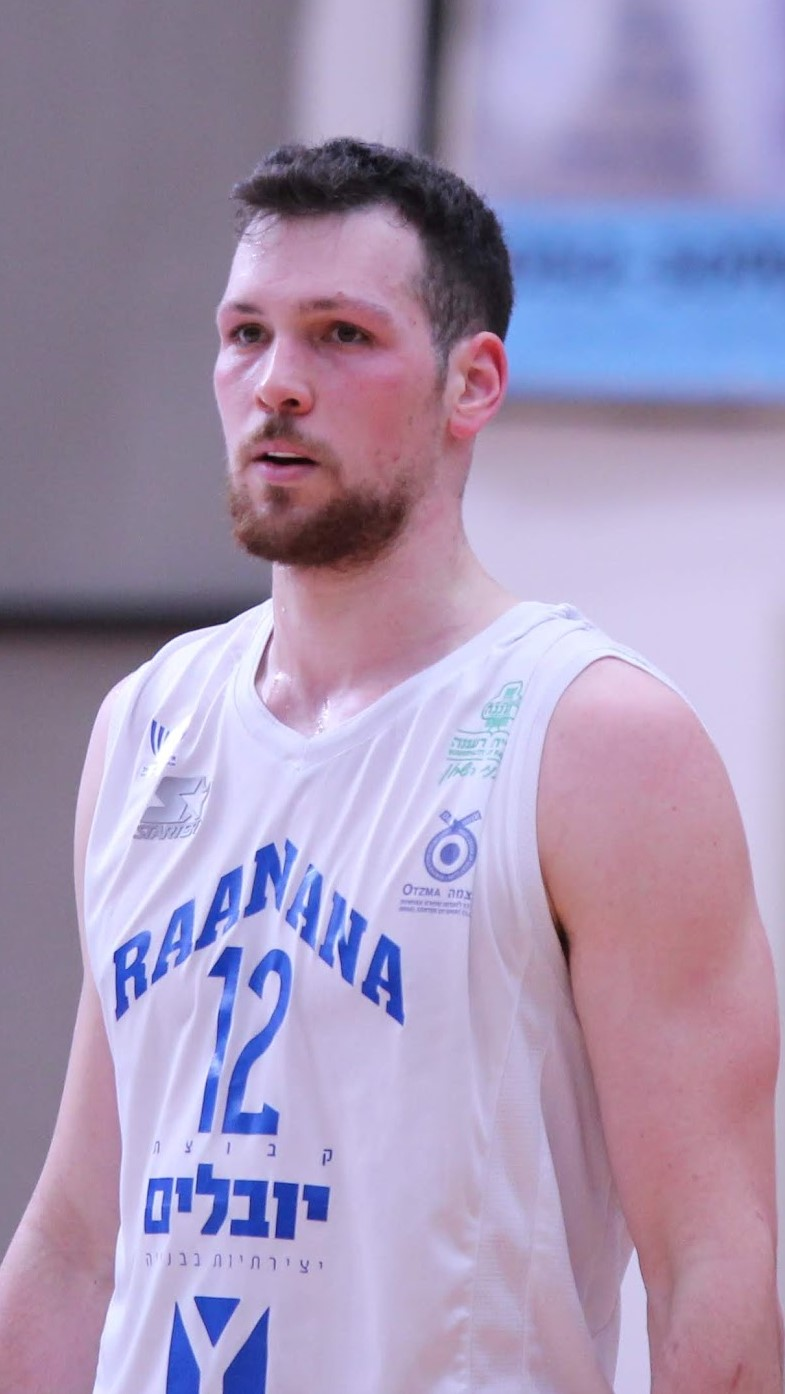
Uriel Trocki

- Celia Barboza (born 1977) – surfing champion
- Esteban Batista – first Uruguayan to play in the National Basketball Association
- Alberto Domínguez – Uruguayan and Australian cyclist. Represented Uruguay at the 1958 Pan American Games
- Alfredo Evangelista – boxer
- José María Flores Burlón – boxer
- Marcel Felder (born 1984) – tennis player
- Emiliano Lasa, track and field athlete, Olympic finalist
- Oscar Moglia – Olympic medal-winning basketball player
- Andy Ram (born 1980) – Uruguay-born Israeli tennis player
- Uriel Trocki (born 1996) – Uruguayan-Israeli basketball player for national team and in the Israeli Basketball Premier League
- Milton Wynants – Olympic silver medal-winning cyclist

== Economists ==
- Azucena Arbeleche (born 1970) – economist, professor, and civil servant
- Arturo C. Porzecanski – Wall Street economist and university professor

== See also ==
- Lists of people by nationality
