= Patrone =

Patrone may refer to:

- Raffaele Patrone, an Italian sculptor
- Virginia Patrone, an Uruguayan artist
- Patrone 88, a rifle cartridge
- Patrón, a brand of tequila
