= Mary da Cuña =

Uruguayan actress and theater director (1942–2016)

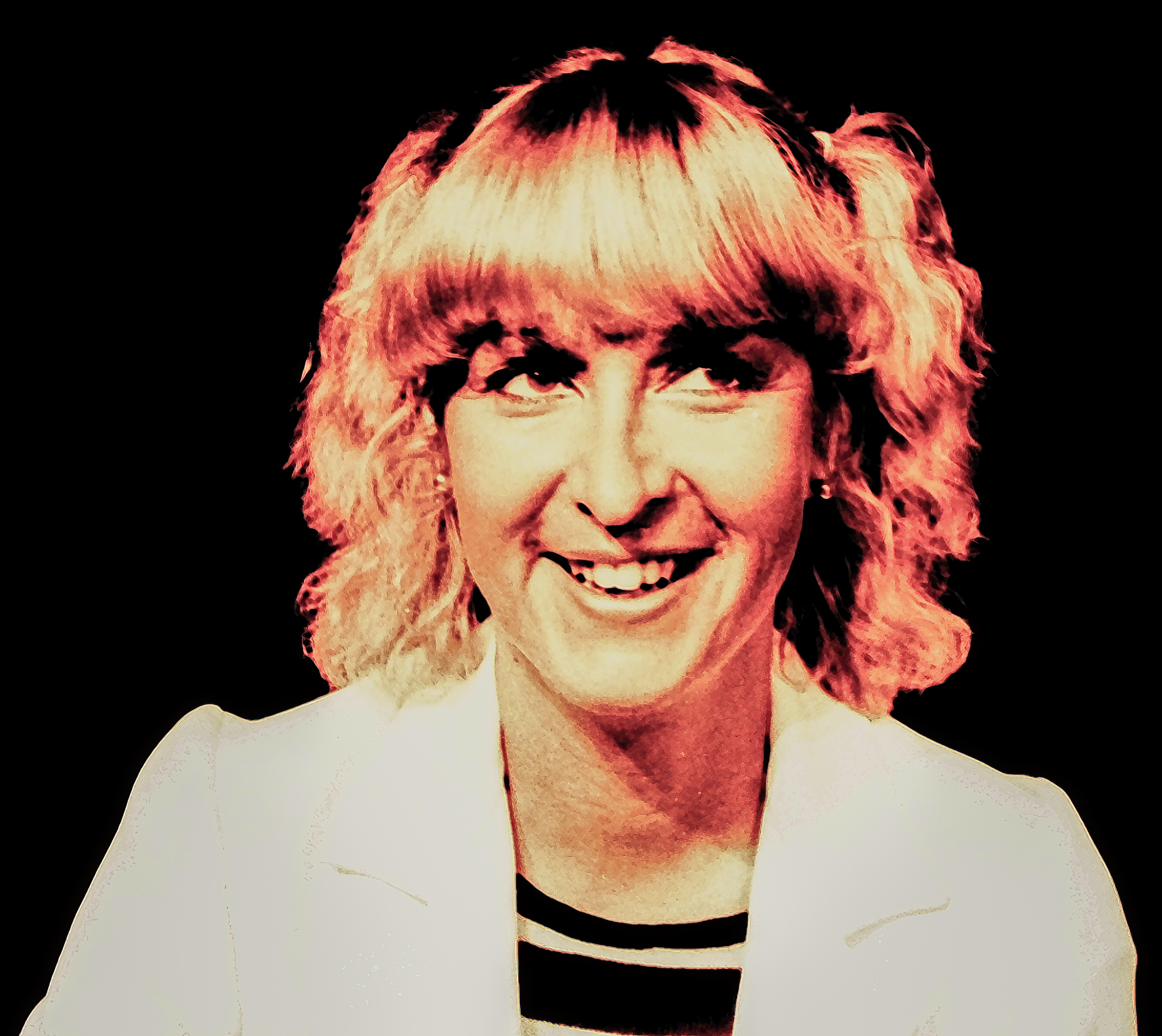
- Born: Mary Isabel da Cuña Rodríguez; 25 November 1942; Montevideo, Uruguay
- Died: 24 September 2016 (aged 73)
- Resting place: Cementerio del Norte, Montevideo
- Occupations: Actress, theater director
- Spouse: Jorge Denevi
- Children: Julieta Denevi
- Awards: Florencio Award (2005)

Mary Isabel da Cuña Rodríguez (25 November 1942 – 24 September 2016) was a Uruguayan actress and theater director.

== Biography ==
Mary da Cuña began her theatrical training at the school of the Theater Club, founded by Antonio Larreta, where she worked with Héctor Manuel Vidal, Nelly Goitiño, Roberto Jones, Roberto Fontana, Villanueva Cosse, and Juan Alberto Sobrino, among others. In that same space she made her debut as an actress in 1969 with Misia Dura al poder, a theatrical play with political content and writing credit shared by several authors, directed by Jorge Denevi. Her professional debut was in 1971.

She worked under directors such as Sergio Otermin, Rubén Yáñez, Villanueva Cosse, Jorge Denevi, Carlos Aguilera, Alberto Rivero, Gloria Levy, and Ruben Coletto. She acted in works by Shakespeare, Woody Allen, Michael Frayn, Neil Simon, George Tabori, Harold Pinter, and Copi.

In 1975 da Cuña became the first woman to be part of a murga performance in the official contest, when she joined Los Diablos Verdes.

In television she was one of the most visible faces of the comic programs Telecataplúm (where she worked on its second stage with Roberto Jones, Pepe Vázquez, and Imilce Viñas) and Plop!

In 1990 she began working as a teacher at Eduardo Ramírez's School of Dance, the La Gaviota School of Theater, the School of Musical Comedy, and her own school of acting training.

She won the 2005 Florencio Award for best actress for the work Raspando la cruz by Rafael Spregelburd, and received seven other Florencio nominations.

Her state of health led her to stop acting and focus on theater direction. She died at age 73, due to the aftermath of a prolonged vasculitis, and was buried in the Cementerio del Norte, Montevideo.

She was divorced from actor and theater director Jorge Denevi, with whom she had a daughter and a granddaughter, actress Julieta Denevi and her daughter Marcia Olivera.
