= Cementerio del Norte =

Cementerio del Norte may refer to:

- Cementerio del Norte, Madrid, Spain (disestablished)
- Manila North Cemetery, Philippines
- Cementerio del Norte, Montevideo, Uruguay
- La Recoleta Cemetery, Buenos Aires, Argentina
