= Imilce Viñas =

Uruguayan actress, theatre director and humorist

- Born: 31 December 1939; Montevideo, Uruguay
- Died: 13 August 2009 (aged 69); Montevideo, Uruguay
- Resting place: Cementerio del Norte
- Occupations: Actress, theater director, comedian
- Spouse: Pepe Vázquez
- Awards: Florencio Award (1985, 1992)

Imilce Viñas (31 December 1939 – 13 August 2009) was a Uruguayan actress, comedian, teacher, and theater director.

== Biography ==
Imilce Viñas entered the world of acting at an early age. She had a distinguished career in theater and television from 1957 to 1998. She was especially famous for her character in the duo Doña Lola and Coquita, played with actress Laura Sánchez.

She debuted on El show del mediodía with Cacho de la Cruz. She excelled in the genre of comedy, often collaborating with her husband, actor Pepe Vázquez. The two ran Café Shakespeare & Co, until they were forced to leave the country during the military dictatorship. She sought refuge first in Costa Rica, where she remained for six years (1977–1983), and then in Mexico, where she stayed just one year, until 1985. With the return of democracy to Uruguay, Viñas and her husband returned, and continued their work in the world of entertainment. On television, they participated in Telecataplúm and Plop!.

Her characters were usually humble and simple, seeking to connect with the average population, echoing their problems and taking them to the stage. Of special interest was her character Doña Lola, the typical barrio neighbor who prepared the mate and who always had something to tell.

Among the honors she received in her career was the 1985 Florencio Award for best actress, for her participation in Arturo Fleitas' play Cuatro para Chejov. She was awarded again in 1992 for her dramatic role as best supporting actress in the Neil Simon play Lost in Yonkers. She also ventured into the genre of operetta, with La belle Hélène by Jacques Offenbach.

In her last years, she became a theater director and teacher, coming to direct the National Comedy at the Solís Theatre in Montevideo. On the date of her death, she was working on the play El suicidado, which continued with her name on the bill as a tribute. On her career in theater, she said:

Doing theater is a great agreement between people who want to do the same thing and that gives them pleasure. I have always looked for that: that what I did, beyond how one can judge from the point of view of artistic tastes, will provoke aesthetic pleasure, through directing or acting.

She directed a stage art workshop in Montevideo.

Imilce Viñas died on 13 August 2009, from liver failure caused by hepatocellular carcinoma that had afflicted her for months. Her remains were buried in Montevideo's Cementerio del Norte.

== Adaptations and translated works ==
- Reír en uruguayo
- Nosotros que nos queremos tanto (1996), a version of A Midsummer Night's Dream by William Shakespeare
