= Virginia Patrone =

Uruguayan visual artist (born 1950)

- Born: 1950 (age 75–76); Montevideo, Uruguay
- Education: Studio of Pepe Montes; Universidad Mayor de la República
- Occupation: Visual artist
- Known for: Painting, murals, teaching
- Notable work: Murals for Juego de Damas Crueles
- Style: Figurative, symbolic
- Awards: Premio Figari (2019), Fulbright Grant (1988), Florencio Award (1997)

Virginia Patrone (born 1950 in Montevideo, Uruguay) is an Uruguayan visual artist who worked in Uruguay before moving to Spain in 2003.

== Education ==
In 1971, Patrone began her studies as an architect in the Faculty of Architecture, in the Universidad Mayor de la República, Uruguay's National University. In 1978, she turned to painting, studying until 1981 in the Studio of Pepe Montes. Montes himself had trained in the studio of the renowned Montevideo artist Joaquín Torres García.

Patrone is a founding member of the Buenaventura Studio, established in 1989 with the artists Carlos Musso, Carlos Seveso, and Álvaro Pemper. Patrone has also taught courses at and was invited to the School of Fine Arts at Montevideo's Universidad Mayor de la República, New York's Museum of Modern Art, the State University of New York (SUNY) and educational programs in museums in Barcelona and Madrid.

== Press ==
In a 1992 review of Patrone's work at Los Angeles' Linda Moore Gallery,the Los Angeles Times art critic noted that in "her phantasmagoric scenes, now on view at the Linda Moore Gallery, she bestows women and buildings alike with a full-bodied sensuality."

== Awards ==
Recent Award: Premio Figari 2019, highest fine arts award in Uruguayhttps://www.museofigari.gub.uy/innovaportal/v/123378/20/mecweb/virginia-patrone.In 1988 Patrone obtained a Fulbright Grant. She won First Prize at the 1986 City Hall Fine Arts Showroom in Montevideo, and at the 1996 Uruguayan Republic Bank's Century Painting Showroom. She was also awarded prizes for excellence in painting at the 1987 National Association of Communications Painting Showroom , and for Drawing at the Uruguayan Republic Bank Art Hall in 1987 and 1988., She has had solo exhibitions at the Metropolitan Museum of Tokyo in 1990, and the State University of New York (SUNY). Her work is featured in the collections of the Inter-American Development Bank (Washington, DC), National Museum of Visual Arts (Montevideo, Uruguay), the Juan Manuel Blanes Fine Arts Museum (Montevideo, Uruguay), the Uruguayan Republic Bank Art Hall (Montevideo, Uruguay), the City Hall Museum of San Fernando (Punta del Este, Department of Maldonado, Uruguay) and the American Art Museum (Maldonado, Uruguay).,

In 1997, Patrone won the Florencio Award, Uruguay's most prestigious theatre award, for the murals she produced in collaboration with the artist Álvaro Pemper, for the play Juego de Damas Crueles.

She was invited to represent Uruguay several times:

- Biennial of Painting in Cuenca (Ecuador, 1991 and 1994)
- Latin Art Gallery organized by the Latin-American Development Bank in Nagoya (Japan, 1991)
- Biennial in Valparaíso (Chile, 1994)
- Biennial Vento Sul (Brazil, 1996)

== See also ==
- List of Uruguayans
- List of Latin American artists
