= Esmeralda Mallada =

Uruguayan astronomer and professor

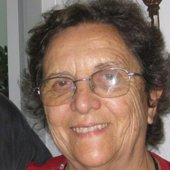
- Born: Esmeralda Herminia Mallada Invernizzi; 10 January 1937; Montevideo, Uruguay
- Died: 12 September 2023 (aged 86); Montevideo, Uruguay
- Education: University of the Republic
- Known for: 16277 Mallada
- Spouse: Héctor de Bethencourt
- Children: Marcelo, Daniel

Esmeralda Herminia Mallada Invernizzi (born 10 January 1937 – 12 September 2023) was a Uruguayan astronomer and professor who, for her contributions to that scientific discipline, had been honored with the designation of her name to an asteroid.

== Career ==
Mallada was a student of cosmography with Professor Alberto Pochintesta. At the University of the Republic's Faculty of Engineering, she was a colleague of Gladys Vergara, who helped her prepare for the Secondary Education Council cosmography professorship competition. She became a professor of cosmography and mathematics in secondary education at age 21. She also taught at the university's Faculty of Sciences, where she graduated with a licentiate in astronomy. She is currently retired.

On 16 October 1952, at the invitation of Pochintesta, she was one of the founders of the Association of Amateur Astronomers (AAA) in Uruguay, and in 2015 was made its honorary president. In 2015, the Minor Planet Center of the International Astronomical Union designated an asteroid that orbits between Mars and Jupiter with her name, 16277 Mallada. It is the first asteroid to bear the name of a Uruguayan woman astronomer.

== Publications ==
Some of the works published by Mallada together with Julio A. Fernández are:

- "Distribution of Binding Energies in Wide Binaries"
- "Potential sources of terrestrial water close to Jupiter"
- "Dynamical Evolution of Wide Binaries"
