= Malena Muyala =

Uruguayan singer-songwriter (born 1971)

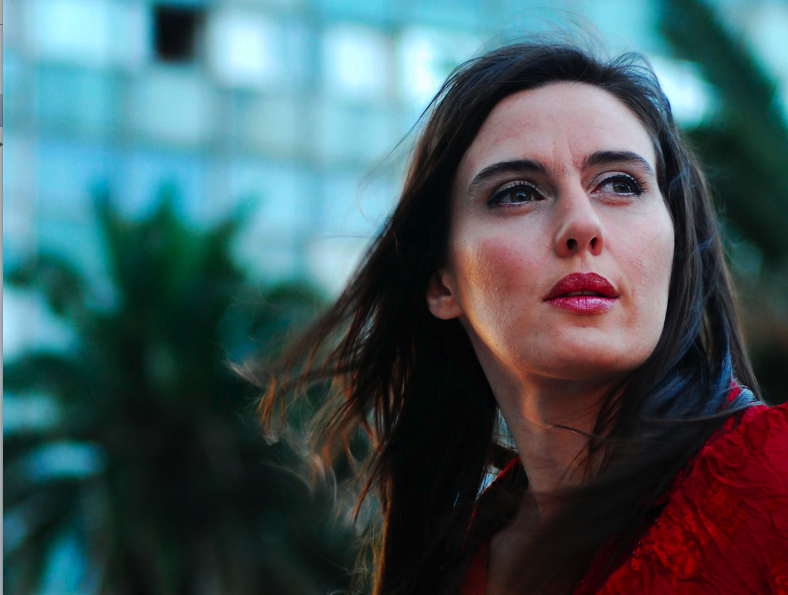

Background information
- Born: Malena Muyala; 23 March 1971 (age 55); San José de Mayo, Uruguay
- Origin: Montevideo, Uruguay
- Genres: Tango, milonga, Uruguayan pop
- Occupations: Singer, songwriter
- Instruments: Vocals, guitar
- Label: Bizarro
- Website: www.malenamuyala.com

Malena Muyala (born 23 March 1971) is a Uruguayan singer-songwriter who specializes in tango and milonga music. She has released several albums that were certified gold and platinum, and has toured within and outside Uruguay.

== Early life ==
Muyala was born in San José de Mayo, Uruguay. She is partly of Lebanese descent. Her family, especially her grandmother, supported her passion for music and theatre. She enjoyed singing to the radio and television. At age 11, she joined Teatro Macció where she took classes in the dramatic arts, and participated in productions for "Nuestro Pueblo" (Our Town) and "Vámonos" (Let's Go).. She learned to play guitar and took singing lessons, and when she was around 12–13, she formed various music groups. including an all-female Murga group. In 1988, she moved to Montevideo to study medicine but also joined the acting troupe Antimurga BCG, which was directed by Jorge Esmoris. She acted and sang in the plays "Entre Locos y Loquitos", "Papitas y Boniatos al Horno", and "Sexo, Chocolate y BCG".

== Career ==
Muyala's music career took off in 1991 when she won first prize at the First National Tango Contest of Uruguay, which involved 350 participants from all over the country. That same year, she put together a band and toured the country. In 1994 she was invited by singer-songwriter Estela Magnone in the group Seda in a concert for her disc Prismatic Vals at the Vaz Ferreira theater. She was a solo singer and performed with musicians Pitufo Lombardo, Shyra Panzardo, Cinthia Gallo and Estela Magnone.

In 1997, she worked on a project "Malena Tanto Tango y Tanto Amor" ("Malena, so much tango and so much love"), which she presented to the Uruguayan Ministry of Culture and Education. The project was selected to be presented in six cities in the country's interior, as well as Montevideo during 1998. In December 1998, Muyala released her first album, Temas Pendientes through the record label Ayuí. It reached fourth place in the best-selling albums in December according to the Cámara Uruguaya del Disco and received an Iris Prize. In 1999, Muyala worked with Malacara Producciones, who has been working with musician Jaime Roos, on the Ciclo Música del Sol y de la Luna (Music Cycle of the Sun and the Moon) concert series. Her Temas album received a Disco de Oro (Gold Disc). In 2000 she continued touring for Temas in Argentina. She recorded her second album Puro Verso (Pure Verse) in Montevideo and Buenos Aires, and released it that year.

In 2007, she released her third album Viajera (Voyager), which was then certified Gold. In December 2008, she was accompanied by the Philharmonic Orchestra of Montevideo for a show called Malena Muyala + La Filarmonica at the steps of the Hotel del Prado to celebrate the tenth anniversary of her first album. She recorded her fourth CD live and her first DVD called Malena Muyala en el Solís at the Solis Theatre; it was released in 2009.

In 2010, she performed on the Palacio Legislativo (Legislative Palace) steps for the new legislators' first day in Parliament. She was invited by Argentinian authorities to participate in a bicentennial celebration. She performed with the Philharmonic Orchestra of Montevideo for the mayor's assumption ceremony. In 2011, she performed for Uruguay's bicentennials for events concerning Jose Artigas and the Oriental Revolution at Mercedes, Las Piedras and Montevideo. She also recorded alongside other major artists a song for the Fundación Celeste, a nonprofit organization put together by the Uruguay national team to promote sports.

In 2011, Muyala toured the Montevideo neighborhoods, and listened to stories from locals. She documented her experience in a book and album project called Pebeta de mi Barrio. Her tour was declared of interest by the United Nations and UNESCO, and was given an award by Festival Cubadisco 2012.

== Members ==
The members of Muyala's band:

- Fredy Pérez – guitar, vocals, arrangements
- Mauro Carrero – guitar
- Juan Rodríguez – cello, arrangements
- Enrique Anselmi – bass
- Gustavo Montemurro – piano, accordion
- Gerónimo de León – drum percussion

Band members when she toured Argentina:

- Alejandro Ridilenir – guitar
- Rodrigo Genni – drums
- Pablo Martín – standup bass

Former members

- Shyra Panzardo – bass guitar

== Discography ==
=== Studio albums ===
Title	Album details	Certifications (Cámara Uruguaya del Disco)	Refs
Temas pendientes (Unresolved issues)	Released: 1998; Label: Ayuí / Tacuabé (Uruguay), Mulato Músicas (Argentina); Format: CD; Re-released: 2011	Platinum	
Puro verso (Pure verse)	Released: 2000; Label: Ayuí / Tacuabé (Uruguay); Format: CD	Gold	
Viajera (Voyager) (also Muger de Tango)	Released: 2006–07; Label: Bizarro Records (Uruguay), Los Años Luz Discos (Argentina); Format: CD	Platinum	
Pebeta de mi Barrio	Released: 2011; Label: Bizarro Records & Santillana (Uruguay); Format: CD+Book		

=== Live and video albums ===
Title	Album details	Certifications (Cámara Uruguaya del Disco)	Refs
Malena Muyala en el Solís	Released: 2009; Label: Bizarro Records (Uruguay); Format: CD+DVD	Platinum DVD	

== Awards and nominations ==
- Spokesperson for the Fundación Álvarez Caldeyro Barcia
- Woman of the Year
- Joven Sobresaliente
- Iris Award / Diario El País
- 2009: Outstanding Citizen of Montevideo
- 2010: Graffiti Award (Uruguay music award), Best Tango album for Malena Muyala en el Solís
- 2012: Festival Cubadisco 2012 award, Best International Album for Pebeta de mi Barrio.
