= Beatriz Álvarez Sanna =

Uruguayan chemist (born 1968)

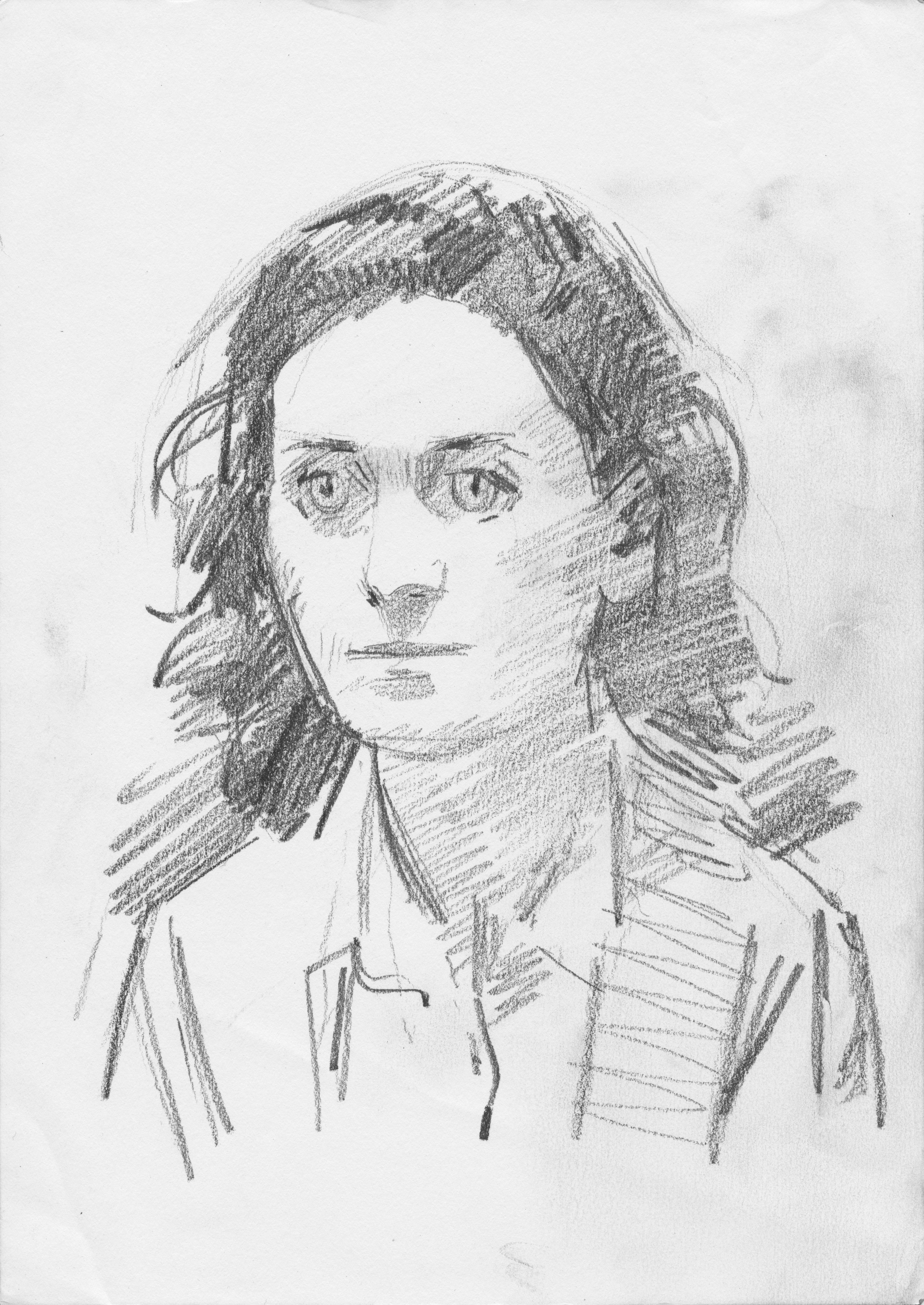
- Born: 17 September 1968 (age 58); Montevideo, Uruguay
- Education: University of the Republic
- Occupations: Biochemist, chemist, professor
- Awards: L'Oréal-UNESCO Award

Beatriz Álvarez Sanna (born 17 September 1968) is a Uruguayan chemist and biochemistry professor at the Faculty of Sciences of the University of the Republic. She researches in the areas of redox biochemistry and enzymology. In 2013 she was the winner of the L'Oréal-UNESCO Award for Women in Science.

== Career ==
Álvarez Sanna earned a bachelor's degree in chemistry in 1991. In 1993 she obtained a master's degree in chemistry with a thesis focused on bacterial metabolism. In 1999 she received her doctorate in chemistry from the University of the Republic. Her thesis focused on the biological chemistry of peroxynitrite.

She works as associate professor at the Enzymology Laboratory of the Faculty of Sciences, University of the Republic.

Her main interests are redox biochemistry, kinetics, and enzymology. She develops lines of research in biological thiols and hydrogen sulfide. She is a member of the Editorial Committee of the Journal of Biological Chemistry.

In 2013 Álvarez Sanna received the L'Oréal-UNESCO National Award. Her project on the biochemistry of hydrogen sulfide deals with this compound and its possible modulation for pharmacological production and administration, which could constitute new alternatives for the treatment of a wide spectrum of conditions, including hypertension, atherosclerosis, diabetes, and inflammation.

She is a researcher at Programa de Desarrollo de las Ciencias Básicas (PEDECIBA), and a Level II member of the Sistema Nacional de Investigadores (SNI).

She is co-author of more than 40 publications in refereed international journals.
