= Pelusa Vera =

Uruguayan actress (born 1940)

- Born: María de los Ángeles Vera Montecoral; 19 August 1940 (age 85); Montevideo, Uruguay
- Occupation: Actress
- Years active: 1957 – present
- Father: Dionisio Alejandro Vera
- Awards: Tabaré Award (1990, 1994)

María de los Ángeles Vera Montecoral (born 19 August 1940), known professionally as Pelusa Vera, is a Uruguayan actress, considered "one of the most prominent figures of theater and television in Uruguay." She began her career as a model, but then went to the theater and from there to television. She also ventured into radio. She was part of the cast of both Uruguayan and Argentine humor shows, such as Alta comedia, Teatro como en el teatro, Decalegrón, Jaujarana, Hiperhumor, and Zapping.

She has received several awards and acted in several countries in Latin America and Europe. In 2010 she received an ex gratia pension "in virtue of services rendered to the national culture."

== Career ==
His father, Dionisio Alejandro Vera, was a journalist for the newspaper El País, editor of a feature called "Filosofía de los lagartos". When Vera was about 15 years old, she started working at the Club de Teatro with Antonio Larreta, and began modeling. She acted at the Teatro del Centro and at the University Theater, in plays by Peter Shaffer and Charles Dyer, among others. She was one of the first to appear on television in Uruguay, working for the three private channels (4, 10, and 12) in programs, commercials, and parades between 1957 and 1964.

She made her radio debut in the series Radioteatro de las Estrellas, in radio plays of the Radio Nacional studio at Palacio Salvo. In 1962 she made her debut in Telecataplúm, a Uruguayan humor program that was also broadcast in Argentina.

In 1964 Vera traveled to Europe as a correspondent for the newspaper El País in Germany. At the same time she continued to work as a model for international magazines such as Für Sie and advertising agencies. Later she traveled to France, still as a correspondent for El País, while doing various jobs. She entered the University of the Theater of Nations, touring the university together with the Spanish director Víctor García, with whom she founded El Retablo, the first Spanish-speaking theater in Paris. The first play shown in the former Grand Guignol Theater was Historias para ser contadas by Osvaldo Dragún. The cabaret "La Fontaine de quatre saisons" also reopened, showing La Rosa de papel by Ramón del Valle-Inclán.

In 1966 she returned to South America, working in theater and television in Montevideo and Buenos Aires. From then until 1992 she was a fixture on the programs that followed Telecataplúm in both cities, like Decalegrón (1977), Jaujarana, Teatro como en el teatro, Alta comedia, Hiperhumor, Zapping, and Shopping Center. In the 1980s she hosted two radio programs: La Revista de Pelusa on Radio Maldonado and Veraneando en Punta, broadcast to several cities in Uruguay, Argentina, and Brazil on Radio Sarandí. She also hosted her first television program, Pelusa TV los sábados, broadcast on Channel 9 from Punta del Este. She followed this up from 1993 to 1995 with a program on which she was also a producer, Todo bien, which would be broadcast by cable and nationwide TV on 25 channels, as well as in Argentina and Brazil.

In 1993 Vera put on the unipersonal Cosas mías, a work of café-chantant that took her to the interior of the country, Buenos Aires, and Caracas. She was also chosen to represent Uruguay in the 20th International Theater of Oriente, developed in Venezuela in 1994, the year in which she also played in Nosotras que nos queremos tanto at the Teatro del Centro. Cosas mías would remain running until 2004.

Vera was a juror in the official contest of the Carnival organized by DAECPU in the category Comedy and Overall Joy. In September 2009, the executive branch was asked to grant her an ex gratia pension (Note: According to Law 16.301 of Uruguay, an ex gratia pension is "a personal benefit of economic character that will only be conferred (...) on those who lacked sufficient resources of their own." In Article 2, Letter B of said law, it is defined that "people who have excelled in relevant scientific, artistic, or cultural activities" can receive an ex gratia pension.) "by virtue of services provided to the national culture," which was granted in August 2010, after being rejected in October 2009 per a report from the Permanent Commission for the Processing of Ex Gratia Pensions.

In 2011 she participated in a video produced by members of the Movement for a Sustainable Uruguay and the Commission of Neighbors and Friends of Punta del Diablo, to warn about the risks of surface mining. Other Uruguayan personalities appeared alongside her, such as Osvaldo Laport, Pitufo Lombardo, Miguel Nogueira, Cristina Morán, Eunice Castro, Silvia Kliche, and Dani Umpi.

== Filmography ==
- Sin querer, queriendo (1985)

== Awards ==
In the 1970s, Vera won a poetry contest of the Argentine Actors Association together with other actors, and as a result, in 1973 10 of her poems were published in the book Los actores poetas. In 1990 and 1994 she was the winner of the Tabaré Award for best humorous actress.
