= Gladys Vergara =

Uruguayan astronomer and professor

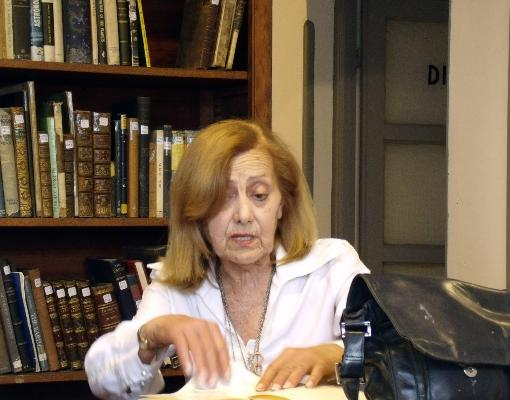
- Born: Gladys Elena Vergara Gavagnin; 1928
- Died: 5 July 2016 (aged 87–88); Montevideo, Uruguay
- Education: University of the Republic
- Occupations: Astronomer, professor

Gladys Elena Vergara Gavagnin (1928 – 5 July 2016) was a Uruguayan astronomer and professor, known for her calculations on eclipses, made during a time when computers were not capable of them. The asteroid 5659 Vergara is named in her honor.

== Career ==
Vergara studied physical sciences and astronomy, at a time when both fields were inaccessible for women. She was part of the first generation of students of the Astronomy Department founded by Dr. Cernuschi in the University of the Republic's Faculty of Humanities and Sciences. In 1952, she was one of the founders of the Association of Astronomy Aficionados. She was secretary of the Uruguayan Antarctic Institute.

On 18 July 1968, Chilean astronomers Carlos Torres and S. Cofré discovered, at the Cerro El Roble Astronomical Station in Chile, a new main belt asteroid that was provisionally designated 1968 OA1. After Vergara's death, the International Astronomical Union (IAU) named the asteroid 5659 Vergara.

Gladys Vergara was secretary of the directing council of the Uruguayan Antarctic Institute, according to the resolution approved by the First National Antarctic Convention, held in Montevideo from 24 to 27 April 1970. The dictatorship of 1973 dismissed her and she was unemployed until the return of democracy in 1985. Vergara was a professor of Astronomy of the Secondary Education Council.

Vergara was the Director of the Observatory of Montevideo, a professor at the Surveying Institute of the Faculty of Engineering, and a professor at the Batlle y Ordóñez Institute when it was the Women's Institute.

Vergara encouraged her students to buy a 10 cm Unitron refracting telescope that was used to inaugurate the Observatory of the Women's Institute of Secondary Education, Batlle y Ordóñez Institute (IBO), of which she was one of the founders in January 1976.

She was one of the founders of the National Committee of Astronomy of Uruguay.

At the Faculty of Engineering she was a classmate of Lic. Professor Esmeralda Mallada, in whose honor the asteroid 16277 Mallada was named.

Gladys Vergara died in Montevideo on 5 July 2016.
