= Faculty of Sciences (University of the Republic) =

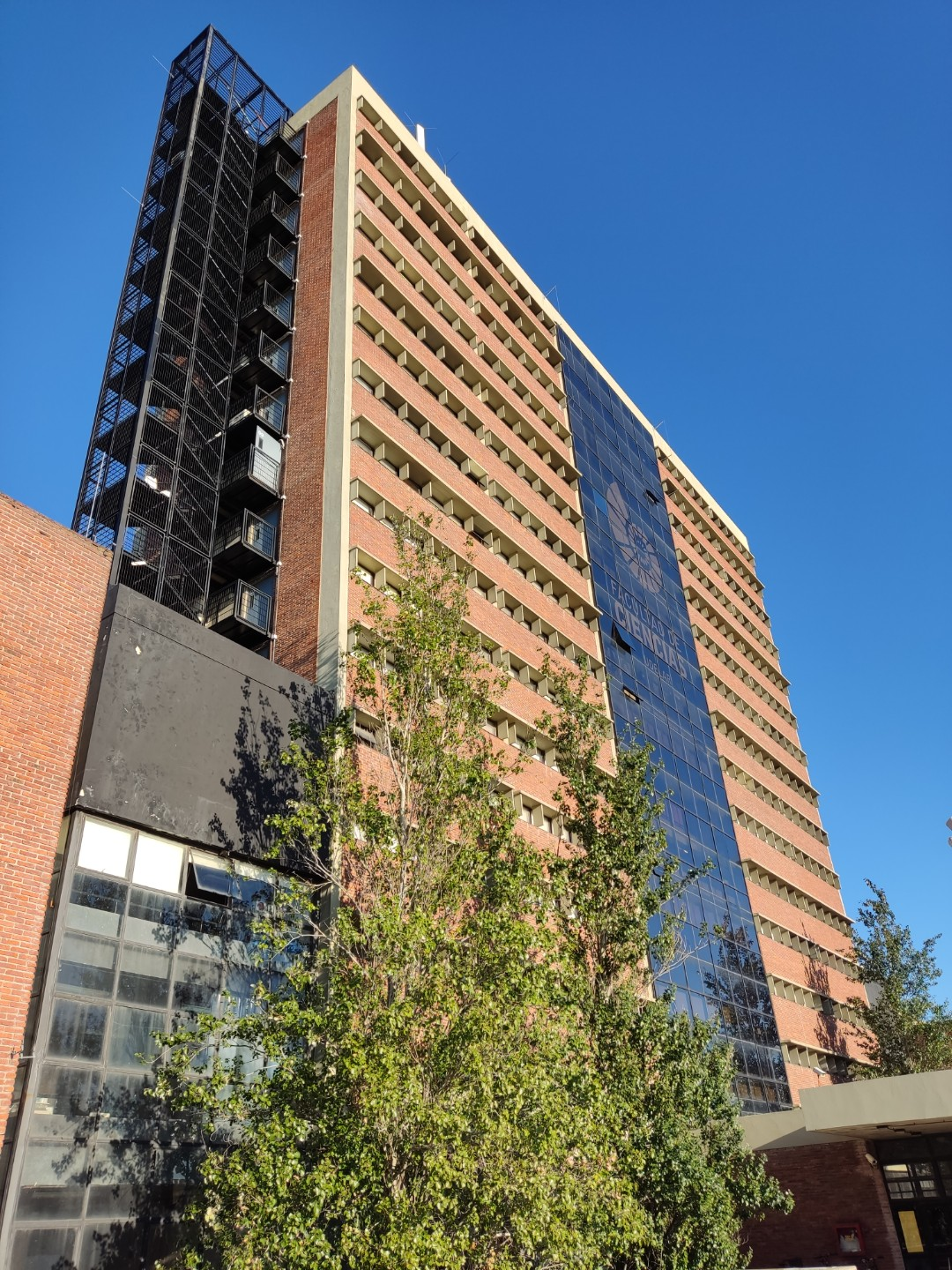
- Type: Public, secular, autonomous
- Established: November 21, 1990
- Dean: Mónica Marín
- Academic staff: 307
- Students: 3945 (2012)
- Location: Iguá 4225 (corner of Mataojo), Montevideo, Uruguay
- Website: www.fcien.edu.uy
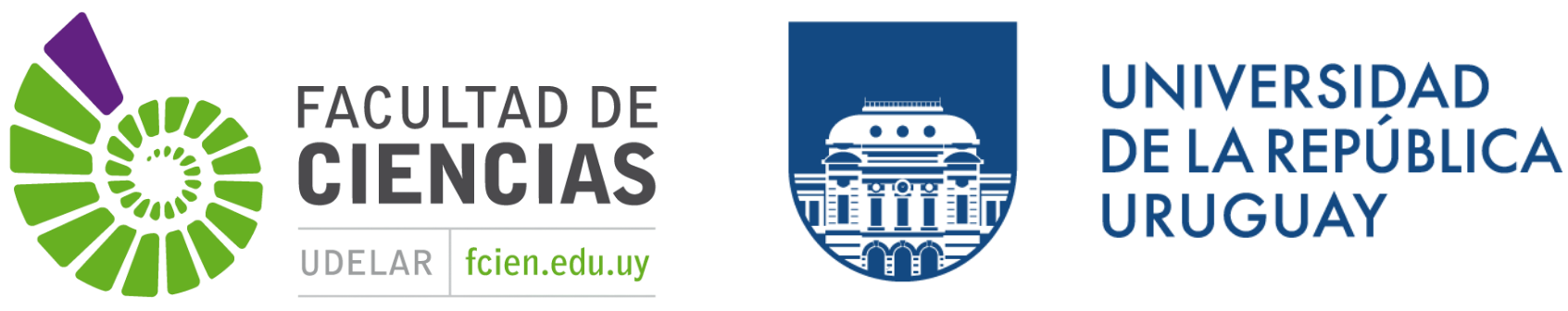

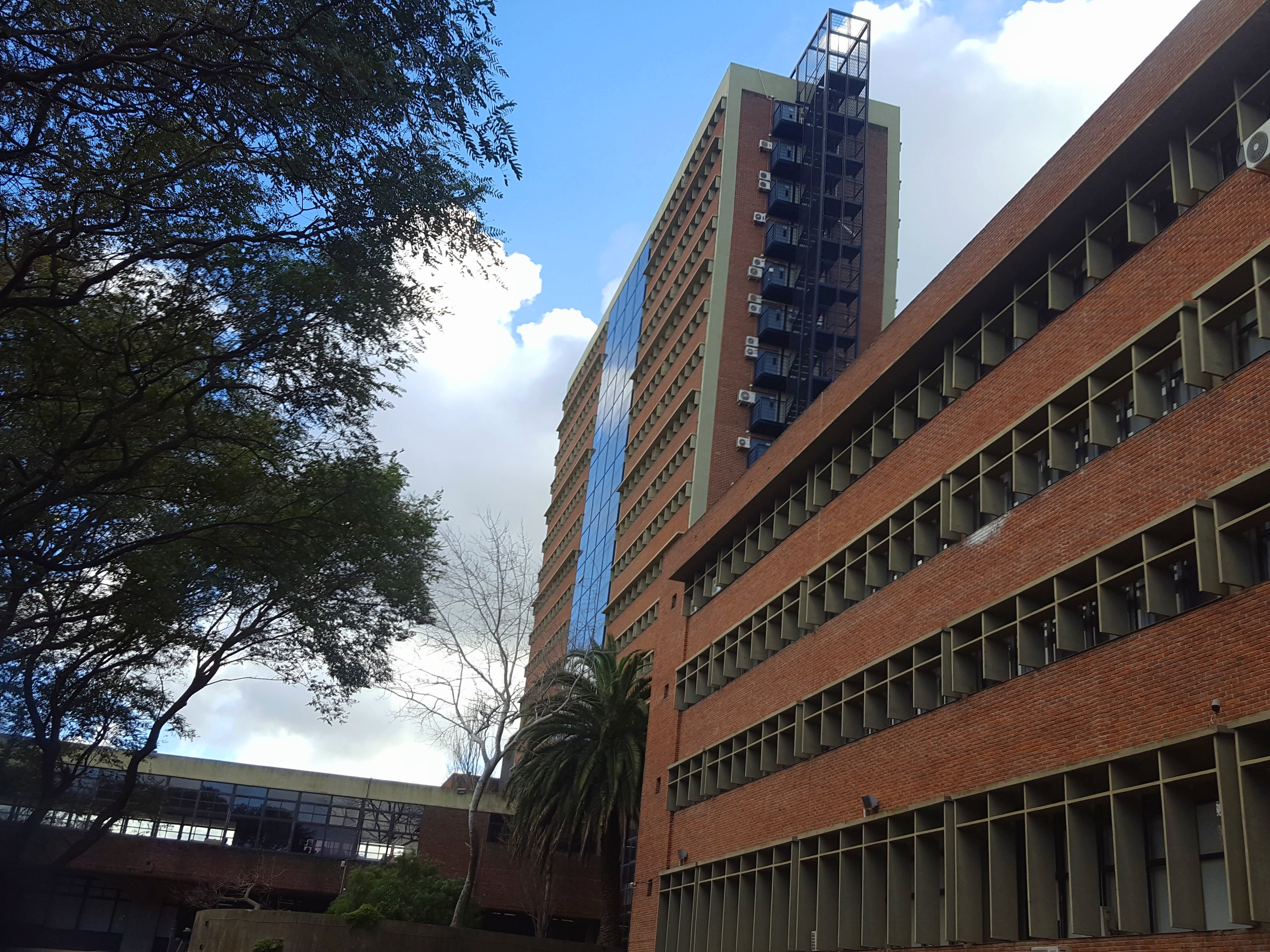
Main building of the Faculty of Sciences

The Faculty of Sciences of the University of the Republic of Uruguay is a public institution of teaching, research and extension in the area of natural and exact sciences.

The Faculty offers more than 20 undergraduate and postgraduate degrees in various natural and exact sciences. It comprises approximately 15% of the researchers in the National System of Researchers (SNI) of the country.

It has 3945 students enrolled, according to the VII Census of University Students of the Republic in 2012 and more than 400 teachers.

== History ==
On November 21, 1990, the creation of the Faculty of Sciences of the Republic was approved by the Universidad de la República, after being part of the former Faculty of Humanities and Sciences. Nine years after its creation, it moved to a new university building constructed and adapted especially for studies in sciences, with numerous laboratories and sophisticated equipment. In June 2012, the institution was named after Prof. Dr. Mario Wschebor, in tribute to the first dean of the institution.

== Undergraduate and Graduate Degrees ==
The Faculty offers the following undergraduate degrees in sciences:

- Bachelor of Human Biology (awarded jointly by the Faculty of Sciences, Faculty of Medicine, Faculty of Dentistry, and Faculty of Humanities and Education Sciences)
- Bachelor of Biochemistry
- Bachelor of Biological Sciences
- Bachelor of Biotechnology
- Bachelor of Atmospheric Sciences (jointly with the Faculty of Engineering)
- Bachelor of Astronomy
- Bachelor of Physical Sciences
- Bachelor of Statistics
- Bachelor of Medical Physics
- Bachelor of Geography
- Bachelor of Geology
- Bachelor of Mathematics
- Cartography Technologist (2 years)
- Bachelor of Natural Resources (taught in Rivera)
- Technician in Management of Natural Resources and Sustainable Development (2 and a half years, taught in Rivera)

It also grants the following graduate degrees (master's and doctorate):

- Master's in Biotechnology
- Master's in Biological Sciences
- Master's in Environmental Sciences
- Master's in Physics
- Master's in Mathematics
- Ph.D. in Biological Sciences
- Ph.D. in Physics
- Ph.D. in Mathematics
- Ph.D. in Environmental Sciences

== Students ==
Student Enrollment
1999	2007	2012
1700	4378/4710	3945

In 2012, the students were distributed as follows: 1 in Astronomy, 1134 in Biochemistry, 1710 in Biological Sciences, 3 in Meteorological Sciences, 157 in Geography, 221 in Geology, 588 in Mathematics, 784 in Physical Sciences, 103 in Natural Resources, 24 in Environmental Management, and 44 in Management of Natural Resources.

== Academic Structure ==
=== Institutes ===
- Biological Sciences
- Biological Chemistry
- Mathematics
- Ecology and Environmental Sciences
- Physics
- Nuclear Research
- Geological Sciences

=== Units ===
- Teaching
- Science and Development
- Geography Department
- Extension and Activities in the Community
- Continuing Education
- Research Support
- Practical Laboratories
- Electron Microscopy

== Deans ==
The first dean of the Faculty was Mario Wschebor, serving two consecutive terms, from the creation in December 1990 until 1998. He was succeeded by Ricardo Ehrlich (biochemist), who completed the term from 1998 to 2002 and resigned in the middle of his second term in early 2005 to run as a candidate for the Frente Amplio for the Montevideo Departmental Government, being succeeded by Julio Ángel Fernández. In 2010, Fernández completed his deanship, and he was succeeded by Juan Cristina, who served two consecutive terms (2010 to 2014 and 2014 to 2018), followed by Mónica Marín, the current dean of the Faculty of Sciences.

Dean	Period
Dr. Mario Wschebor	1990-1998
Dr. Ricardo Ehrlich	1998-2005
Prof. Julio Ángel Fernández	2005-2010
Dr. Juan Cristina	2010-2018
Dra. Mónica Marín	2018 - present
