= Raffaele Patrone =

Italian sculptor

Raffaele Patrone (Naples, February 6, 1845-? ) was an Italian sculptor.

== Biography ==
He studied sculpture in the Institute of Fine Arts of Naples, where he won first prize three times at their competitions. He was awarded a stipend to study in Florence, and in 1869 moved to that city. Among the works are: a stucco statue of Galileo; Mario Pagano, displayed at the Promotrice of Napoli; La spina al piede, a life-size statue exhibited at the 1877 National Exposition in Naples; the bust of Paolo Emilio Imbriani, a Neapolitan statesman under both Napoleonic and Bourbon rule, was placed in the sala del Consiglio Provinciale of Naples; Paolo's son Giorgio Imbriani, was completed in bronze and exhibited at Milan in 1881. Giorgio had died fighting in 1870 with Garibaldi and the Army of the Vosges in France. He also sculpted the statue of General Mariano d'Ayala and that of Cardinal Sisto Riario Sforza, the latter found in the Cathedral of Naples. He sculpted the statues of General Duke of Sangro and of General Duke of San Vito for the Cathedral of Gaeta. He was awarded the silver medal for design at the 1859 Exposition, he became associate and honorary professor at the Institute of Fine Arts of Naples.
