= Susana Pintos =

Uruguayan communist political activist

- Born: Susana Pintos Lepra; 25 September 1939; Montevideo, Uruguay
- Died: 21 September 1968 (aged 28); Montevideo, Uruguay
- Cause of death: Gunshot
- Occupation(s): Student, functionary, activist

Susana Pintos Lepra (25 September 1939 – 21 September 1968) was one of the thirteen student martyrs who were killed in Uruguay between 1968 and 1985. She was a student at the School of Construction of the University of Labor of Uruguay and a militant of the Uruguay Federation of University Students (FEUU), the ANCAP Federation (FANCAP), and the Union of Communist Youth (UJC). Her death occurred on 21 September 1968, after she was shot by police during the suppression of a student demonstration.

== Biography ==
Born in 1939, Susana grew up in the Curva de Maroñas neighborhood, along with her parents and four siblings: Wilson, Olga, Elsa, and Nelson. She attended primary school at School No. 55, secondary at Liceo No. 8 and the Alfredo Vásquez Acevedo Institute (IAVA). When she was 20 years old, she joined ANCAP as a functionary. She also began studies at the School of Construction, joining the FEUU.

== Killing ==
In 1968, Jorge Pacheco Areco of the Colorado Party ruled in Uruguay. He governed under the constant approval of a constitutional expedient, the Swift Security Measures, which allowed for the suspension of individual rights. In this context, on 14 August, the dentistry student Líber Arce died. He had been shot two days earlier, when the government ordered that a demonstration demanding free transportation for Uruguayan students be put down. Arce, in this way, became Uruguay's first student martyr.

One month after his death, the FEUU decided to call a protest demonstration against the government's repressive attacks. This took place on 20 September, at the auditorium of the University of the Republic. The government again responded with force; police had recently received a shipment of riot shotguns ordered from the United States, and they opened fire with these on demonstrators in the university's esplanade. Hugo de los Santos, a student of the Faculty of Economics, was shot and wounded. Pintos ran to assist him, holding a white shirt as a sign of peace, and was also wounded by police forces. She died the next day at the Hospital de Clínicas in Montevideo.

== Tributes ==
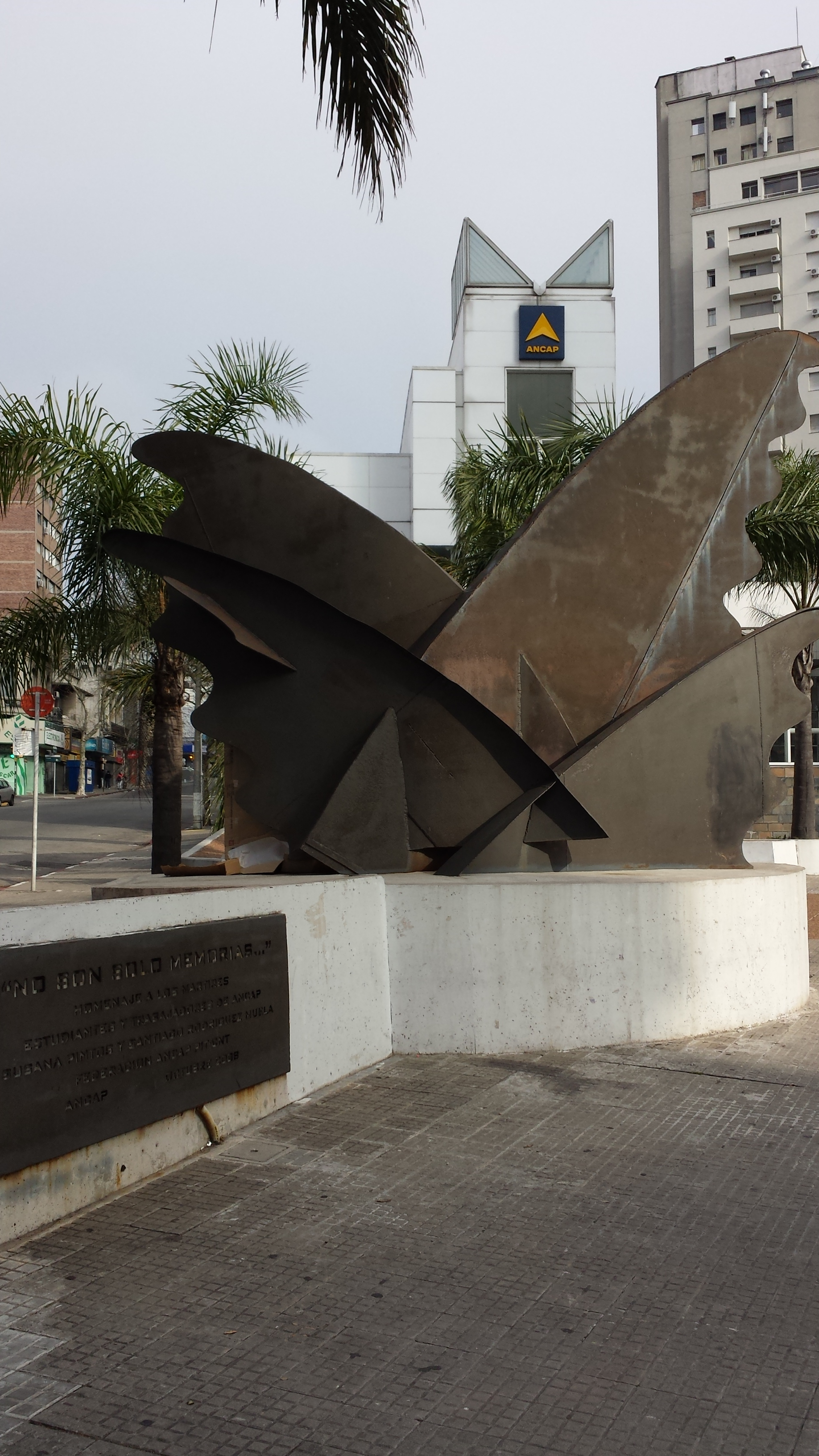
Monument to Susana Pintos, tribute by the ANCAP Federation

Every 14 August, the name of Susana Pintos is one of those remembered as part of Student Martyrs Day, which commemorates the anniversary of the killing of Líber Arce.

On 9 October 2008, a Montevideo plaza located in front of ANCAP headquarters was named "Student Martyrs of ANCAP Susana Pintos and Santiago Rodríguez Muela". Her name was also given to the street formerly known as Carlo Magno, near the place where she lived.
