= Juan Carlos Mondragón =

Uruguayan writer and a literary critic (born 1951)

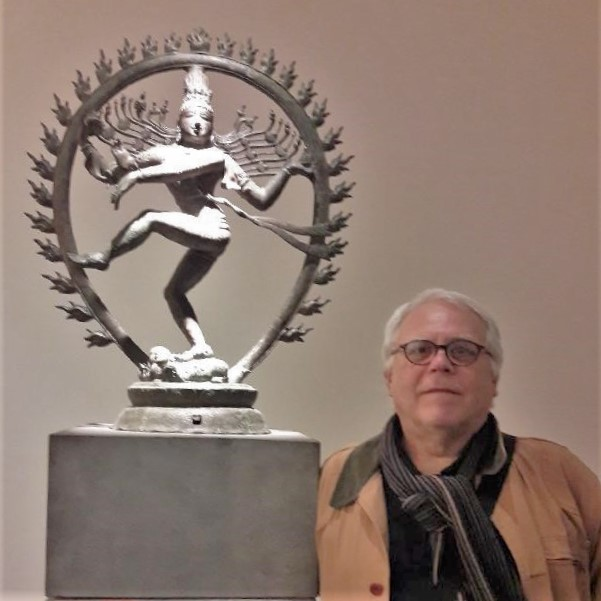
- An Uruguayan writer and literary critic
- Born: 25 February 1951 (age 75); Montevideo, Uruguay
- Occupations: Novelist, essayist, critic

Juan Carlos Mondragón (born 25 February 1951) is an Uruguayan writer and literary critic.

== Early life and education ==
Mondragón was born in Montevideo. He graduated from the Instituto de Profesores Artigas.

== Career ==
As a young man, Mondragón worked as a teacher in Montevideo and wrote advertisement content.

In 1984, he was awarded the Jules Supervielle prize for his essay El arte de comparar (la estética del fracaso en Isidoro Ducasse). He started to publish his fictional work during the eighties and his work was included in several short story anthologies released by Trilce in Montevideo: Cuentos de nunca acabar (1988), Cuentos para pluma y orquesta (1989) y Cuentos bajo sospecha (1989). In 1990, he received the Juan Rulfo prize special mention for his short story Un pequeño nocturno por Libertad Lamarque.

In the mid-eighties, Mondragón traveled to Spain where he finished his doctorate in the Universities of Barcelona. He graduated as a doctor at the Autonomous University of Barcelona after writing a thesis on the theoretical works of Joaquín Torres García. He wrote a second thesis and received the title of doctor for a second time at the Sorbonne-Nouvelle University – Paris III, for his research on the fictional work of Juan Carlos Onetti : Aporie, éclipse et transfiguration de Montevideo dans l'œuvre de Juan Carlos Onetti (thesis defense in 1994).

He was appointed academician (permanent correspondent) by the Uruguayan Academy of Arts for his important literary production and contributions.

Mondragón has lived in Paris since the nineties. He taught Latin-American literature and civilization during several years at Stendhal University in Grenoble, and since 2003 he began working as a lecturer at Lille III University.

== Work ==
- Aperturas, miniaturas, finales, Ediciones de la Banda Oriental, Montevideo, 1885.
- Nunca conocimos Praga, Ediciones de la Banda Oriental, Montevideo, 1986.
- In memoriam Robert Ryan, Ediciones Trilce, Montevideo, 1991.
- "Conducta del antílope hembra", in Veinte años de cuento uruguayo, Linardi y Risso ed., Montevideo, 1991.
- Mariposas bajo anestesia, Ediciones Trilce, Montevideo, 1993.
- Las horas en la bruma, Cal y canto, Montevideo, 1996.
- Nunca conocimos Praga (Transfiguración), Ediciones de la Banda Oriental, Montevideo, 1997.
- Siete partidas, Librería Linardi y Risso, Montevideo, 1998.
- El misterio Horacio Q, Cal y canto, Montevideo, 1998. Planeta. Buenos Aires, 2005.
- Montevideo sin Oriana, Cal y canto, Montevideo, 2000.
- Nunca conocimos Praga (libro tercero), Cal y canto, Montevideo, 2003.
- Pasión y olvido de Anastassia Lizavetta, Planeta, Buenos Aires, 2004.
- "Minotauromaquia al claro de luna", in Cuentos olímpicos, Páginas de espuma, Madrid, 2004.
- Night and Day (espectros de La vida breve), Ediciones del Caballo Perdido, Montevideo, 2006.
- Hagan de cuenta que estoy muerto, Seix Barral, Biblioteca Breve. Buenos Aires, 2007. Ediciones Casus-Belli. Madrid, 2011.
- El viaje a Escritura, Ediciones del Caballo Perdido, Montevideo, 2008.
- Bruxelles piano-bar, Seix Barral. Buenos Aires, 2010.
- Barcelona senza fine, Ediciones del Caballo Perdido, Montevideo, 2011.
- "Dragón entre nubes", in: Buenos Aires Review, August 2013. on line
- La fuente del relato, Seix Barral, Biblioteca Breve, Buenos Aires, 2013.

== French editions and translations ==
- Le centre de carène. MEET / Arcane 17, Saint-Nazaire, 1991. MEET / les bilingües. Saint-Nazaire, 2011.
- Petit nocturne pour Libertad Lamarque, Le Serpent à plumes Nº 22, 1994.
- Papillon sous anesthésie. in Amérique latine, trente ans après. NRF Nº 528. Paris, 1997.
- Monologue de la Mamma. in Aimer sa mère / thèâtre Actes Sud-Papiers, 1998.
- ASA Saint-Nazaire (con Mathieu Schiffman, fotos), MEET Editions. Saint. Nazaire, 1998.
- Droit de réponse, MEET Nº 2, Revue de la Maison des Ecrivains et des traducteurs de St-Nazaire, Saint-Nazaire, 1998.
- Oriana à Montevideo, Seuil, Paris, 2002.
- La nuit où Gilda a chanté Amado mio, in Queen Mary 2 & Saint-Nazaire, MEET, Saint-Nazaire, 2003.
- Le principe de Van Helsing, Seuil, Paris, 2004.
- Montevideo / 71", in Avoir vingt ans, Meeting Nº 5. MEET, Saint-Nazaire, 2007.
- "El viaje de invierno", in TIGRE 15 (Trace et Littérature), CERHIUS, Université Stendhal, Grenoble III, 2006–2007.
- Le capitaine. in Marie-Claud de Brunhoff Les Thèâtres inmoviles. Seuil. Paris, 2008.
- Passion et oubli d'Anastassia Lizavetta, Seuil, Paris, 2010.

== Prefaces and introductions ==
- Preface to Los fuegos de San Telmo by José Pedro Díaz, Ed. de la Banda Oriental, Montevideo, 1987.
- Introduction to La neige de l'Amiral, by Alvaro Mutis. Coll. Les Cahiers Rouges, Grasset, Paris, 1992.
- Introduction to La dernière escale du tramp steamer, by Alvaro Mutis. Coll. Les Cahiers Rouges, Grasset, Paris, 1992.
- Introduction to Ilona vient avec la pluie, by Alvaro Mutis. Coll. Les Cahiers Rouges, Grasset, Paris, 1992.
- Preface to Anaconda, by Horacio Quiroga. Coll. Points, nº R551, Seuil, Paris, 1994.
- Preface to La ville des prodiges, by Eduardo Mendoza. Coll. Points, nº P56, Seuil, Paris, 1995.
- Preface to Le maître d'escrime, by Arturo Pérez-Reverte. Coll. Points nº P154, Seuil, Paris, 1995.
- Preface to Un nom de torero, by Luis Sepúlveda. Coll. Points nº P311, Seuil, Paris, 1996.
- Preface to Héros et tombes, by Ernesto Sábato. Coll. Points nº P311, Seuil, Paris, 1997.
- Preface and notes to Nous l'aimons tant Glenda, by Julio Cortázar. Coll. Folio bilingue, nº84, Gallimard, Paris, 1999.
- Preface to Para sentencia de Omar Prego. Ediciones de la Banda Oriental, Montevideo, 2006.
- Preface to Hommage à l'Amérique latine. Olivier Föllmi, La Martinière, Paris, 2007.

== Essays, criticisms and contributions ==
- "El naipe en la manga: el azar en Borges", in Borges, el último laberinto, Linardi y Risso ed., Montevideo, 1986.
- El arte de comparar (la estética del fracaso en Isidore Ducasse). MZ editor, Montevideo, 1986.
- Co-worker in Diccionario de Literatura uruguaya. Arca, Montevideo, 1987-89.
- "La realidad como polizón o el oleaje tan temido", in Juan Carlos Onetti, medio siglo de escritura, Linardi y Risso ed., Montevideo, 1989.
- "Signos/Palimpsestos", sur une œuvre de Daniel Dezeuze, in " Revue 303, Art, Recherches et Création", Nantes, 1991.
- Aporie, éclipse et transfiguration de Montevideo dans l'œuvre de Juan Carlos Onetti, thesis defense in 1994 in Sorbonne-Nouvelle University – Paris III
- "Pistas para detectar puntos vélicos" (about Julio Cortázar), América. Cahier du CRICCAL Nº 17, Presse de la Sorbonne Nouvelle, Paris, 1996.
- "Juan Carlos Onetti: misterio y transfiguración de Montevideo", in Historia de la literatura uruguaya contemporánea, Vol. 1: La narrativa del medio siglo. Ediciones de la Banda Oriental, Montevideo, 1997.
- "José Pedro Díaz: la literatura mar adentro", in Historia de la literatura uruguaya contemporánea, Vol. 1: La narrativa del medio siglo. Ediciones de la Banda Oriental, Montevideo: 1997.
- "Las ideas estéticas del comisario Medina", Río de la Plata Nº 25 dedicated to Juan Carlos Onetti, CELCIRP, Paris, 2003.
- "El recordado caso de la Galería Vivienne", América. Cahiers du CRICCAL Nº 29, Presses de la Sorbonne Nouvelle, Paris, 2003.
- "La utopía virtual", América. Cahiers du CRICCAL Nº 32, Presses de la Sorbonne Nouvelle, París, 2005.
- "Cuenta el tiempo" (about Jacob y el otro), in Relatos de Juan Carlos Onetti, Ed. ARCHIVOS, Poitiers/Córdoba, 2009.
- "La sonda y el enigma", in Juan José Saer. Glosa y El entenado, Colección Archivos Nº 61, Poitiers, 2010.
- "A propósito de "Lugar" de Juan José Saer", in Critica cultural / Dossiê Juan José Saer, Universidade do Sul de Santa Catarina, Vol. 5, Num 2. Décembre 2010.
- "Ángeles sobre Ecuador: apuntes sobre la prosa de Adoum", Les cahiers du LITORAL I Nº10, Boulogne-sur-Mer/Allemagne, 2011.
- "Lo imborrable. Alma, inclínate sobre los cariños idos" (about a Juan José Saer novel), in Zona de prólogos (Paulo Ricci comp.), Buenos Aires, Seix Barral, 2011.
- "La novela de Carlos Tomatis" (about Juan José Saer work), in Cuadernos LIRICO, 6, Paris, 2011. On line
- "París: ciudad metáfora en la obra de Mario Levrero", in La máquina de pensar en Mario (ensayos sobre la obra de Levrero), Eterna Cadencia, Buenos Aires, 2013.

== Press articles, interviews and works about Mondragón ==
- Pablo Rocca, "Montevideo necesita una mitología", Brecha, Montevideo, 30/10/1992.
- Carina Blixen, "Entre mariposas y vampiros", Brecha, Montevideo, 8/04/1994.
- Carlos Cipriano López, "Después de Quiroga", El País, Montevideo, 6/09/1998.
- Alvaro Ojeda, "Un homenaje en el Bar Siroco", El Observador, Montevideo, 11/10/1998.
- Carina Blixen, "Siete pulseadas con la muerte", El País Cultural Nº 468, Montevideo, 23/10/1998.
- Jorge Albístur, "El grado cien de la escritura", Brecha, Montevideo, 20/11/1998.
- Soledad Platero, "Los complots de la escritura", El País Cultural Nº 475, Montevideo, 11/12/1998.
- Jorge Albístur, "No sólo el lenguaje tiene la palabra", Brecha, Montevideo, 17/11/2000.
- Albert Bensoussan, "Oriana à Montevideo", Magazine Littéraire n°|406, Paris, 02/2002.
- Jean-Didier Wagneur, "En mal d'aurore", Libération, Paris, 30/05/2002.
- Carina Blixen, "Los pasos de Mondragón", Brecha, 28/03/2003.
- Gloria Salbarrey, "Praga por tres", El País Cultural Nº 720, 22/08/2003.
- Silvia Baron Supervielle, "Mondragón à Montevideo", Les Lettres Françaises, 27/04/2004.
- Silvana Tanzi, "Hastío de mujer", Búsqueda, Montevideo, 27/05/2004.
- Carina Blixen, "Los territorios inquietantes", interview, El Paísn°|773, Suplemento Cultural, Montevideo, 27/08/2004.
- Ana Inés Larre Borges, "Sangre en las manos", Brecha, Montevideo, 15/10/2004.
- Rodolfo Modern, "Escritura con meandros y reminiscencias", La Gaceta literaria, Buenos Aires, 4/09/2005.
- María Esther Gilio, "La música del adiós", Brecha, Montevideo, 19/05/2006.
- Alejandro Gortázar, "Espectros de Onetti" (about the novel Night and Day), La Diaria, Montevideo, 1/06/2006.
- Ignacio Bajter, "Las galerías del tiempo", Brecha, Montevideo, 9/11/2007.
- Francisco Tomsich, "A cada cual su Mondragón", Brecha, Montevideo, 27/07/2007.
- Alejandro Gortázar, "El detective en el precipicio", La Diaria, 29/02/2008.
- Alejandro Gortázar, "Yo es un otro", La Diaria, Montevideo, 25/08/2008.
- Ritta Baddoura, "Lautréamont par Mondragón. Portrait magnétique au visage absent.", L'Orient Le Jour, 9/01/2010.
- Eric Loret, "Mondragón tout feu tout flamme", Libération, 11/03/2010.
- Jean Soublin, "Passion et oubli d'Anastassia Lizavetta de Juan Carlos Mondragón: Montevideo, l'épuisée", Le Monde, 11/03/ 2010.
- Jacques Fressard, "La passion d'Anastassia", La Quinzaine Nº 1012, 1-15/04/2010.
- Charif Majdalani, "Douze heures d'une vie ordinaire", L'Orient-Le tour, 1/07/2010.
- Julieta Grosso, "Los hijos de la violencia", Diario El Popular, 17/08/2010.
- Hernán Reyes, "Creador de páginas alucinógenas", El Observador, 21/08/2010.
- Silviana Friera, "En la escritura hay un descontrol de la imaginación", interview, Página 12, 23/08/2010.
- Román García Azcárate, "Me juego a los lectores que hicieron nuestra grandeza", entretien, Revista Eñe, 24/08/2010.
- Christian Kupchik, "¿Cómo instalar la lejana Bruselas a orillas del Río de la Plata?", Tiempo argentino, 28/08/2010.
- Lucía Marroquín, "Mondragón: contra el eclipse", Perfil, 12/09/2010.
- Fernando Krapp, "La ciudad sin orillas", Página 12, 12/09/2010.
- Ángeles Blanco, "Exilio psíquico", Brecha, 19/08/2011. L'article se trouve également sur le blog de la journaliste
- Alexandra Milleville, "L'imagination : zone franche des mondes possibles", Amerika [En ligne], 5 | 2011.
- Valentina Litvan, "Escribir en la orilla. Encuesta a escritores actuales de ambos lados del Río de la Plata", Cuadernos LIRICO [On line], 8 | 2013.
- Alejandro Gortázar, "Il n'y a pas de hors-texte (sobre tres obras de Juan Carlos Mondragón)", in Sujetossujetados (blog), 31/10/2013.
