= Irma Avegno =

Uruguayan businesswoman

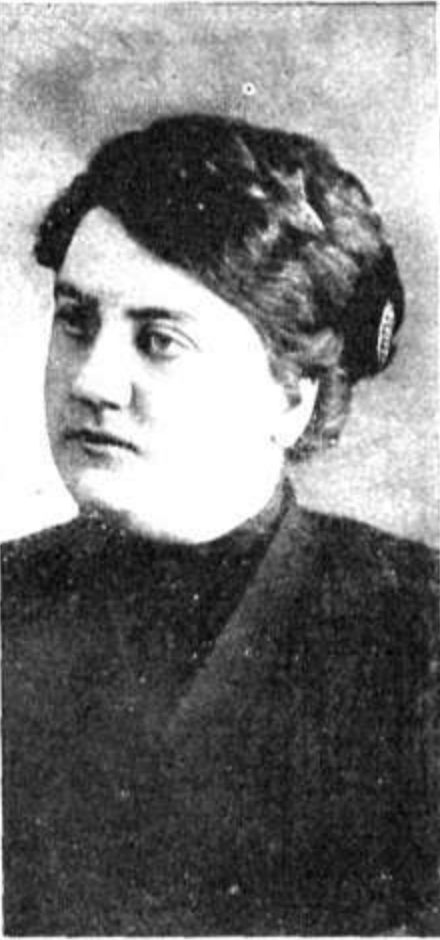
- Avegno in 1913
- Born: 20 December 1881; Montevideo, Uruguay
- Died: June 1913 (aged 31); Lomas de Zamora, Argentina
- Resting place: Central Cemetery of Montevideo
- Occupation: Businesswoman

Irma Avegno (20 December 1881 – June 1913) was a Uruguayan woman of Montevidean high society who devoted herself to financial affairs.

== Biography ==
Irma Avegno was the daughter of Emilio Avegno and María de Ávila, according to her birth certificate. She belonged to a wealthy family linked to the land and, politically, to the Colorado Party. Her father was deputy of that party for Artigas Department, and her uncle, Dr. José Romeu, was Secretary of State, both during the second government of José Batlle y Ordóñez.

She was considered in her own time as a liberal and transgressive person, since she dedicated herself to financial business (she was a moneylender) and to activities traditionally reserved for men, such as betting on horse races. Her openly stated homosexual orientation, which could only be recognized implicitly at the time, also contributed to that perception.

== Death ==
Avegno died in strange circumstances in Lomas de Zamora, Buenos Aires Province, Argentina, as a fugitive from Uruguayan justice. The scandal unleashed by the debts that she left after escaping from the country sent a shockwave through the government of Batlle y Ordóñez. The official cause of death was suicide.

Her body was buried in the Central Cemetery of Montevideo, after having arrived on the steamer Roma, which was awaited by a crowd.

== Works about her life ==
- Armas, Dino (2012). Se ruega no enviar coronas (theater). Montevideo: Estuario ISBN 9789974687998
- Vigil, Mercedes (2000). Una mujer inconveniente: la historia de Irma Avegno (narrative). Montevideo: Fin de Siglo ISBN 9789504912606
