= Pitufo Lombardo =

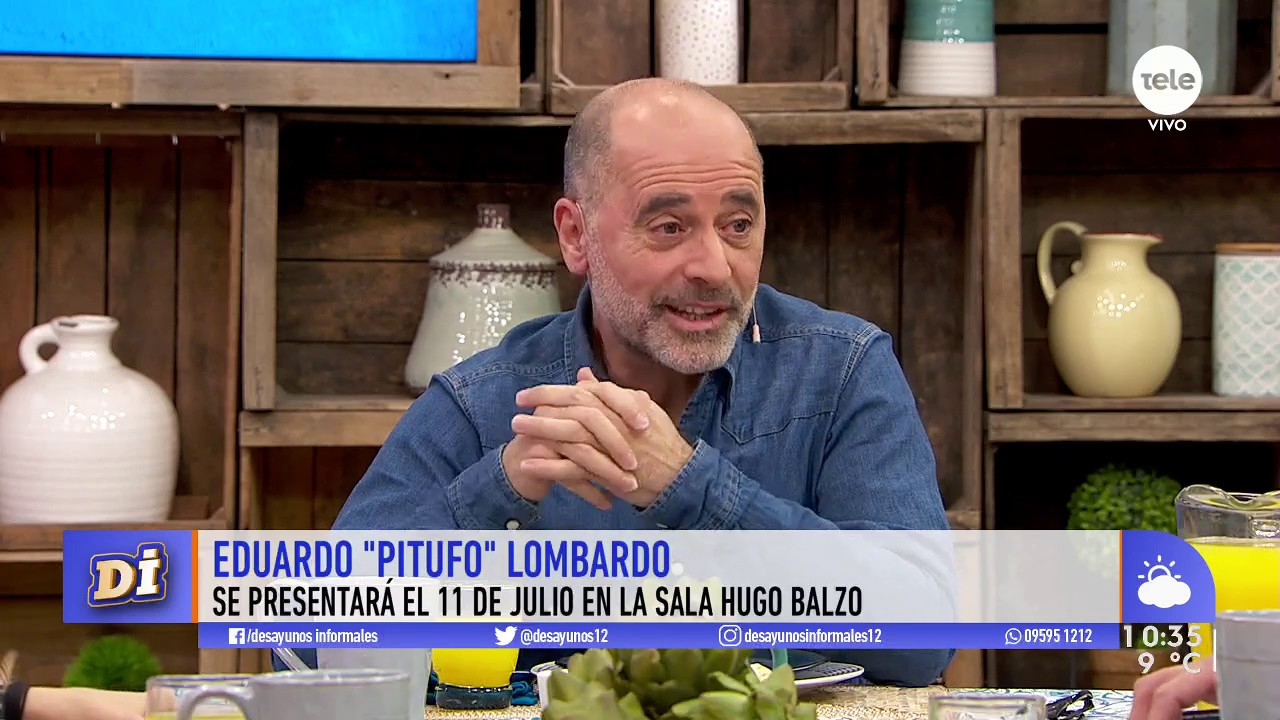

Background information
- Also known as: Edú Lombardo
- Born: Pedro Eduardo Lombardo; 13 March 1966 (age 60); Montevideo, Uruguay
- Genres: Murga; Uruguayan popular song; Rock and roll; Milonga
- Occupations: Musician, singer, composer
- Instruments: Percussion, guitar, voice
- Years active: 1983–present
- Label: Montevideo Music Group

Eduardo Pedro Lombardo (born 13 March 1966), nicknamed Edú and Pitufo (Smurf), is a Uruguayan musician, composer, and singer. He stood out as a teenager as a member of several murgas in his country, in addition to accompanying renowned artists as a percussionist. Since 2007 he has developed a distinguished career as a soloist.

== Career ==
At age 14, Lombardo was one of the founders of the El Firulete children's murga in 1980, the predecessor of what would become Contrafarsa. Being part of this group allowed him to meet various artists, including Jorge Lazaroff, Rubén Olivera, Mauricio Ubal, Rumbo, Canciones para no dormir la siesta, and Fernando Cabrera.

In the mid-1980s he began to study percussion.

In 1984 he joined Falta y Resto, first as a percussionist and then as a director. With this murga he would earn the first prize of the Montevideo Carnival in 1988 and 1989. Later he would also get the first prize with the murgas La Gran Muñeca, Contrafarsa, and Asaltantes con Patente.

In 1987 he was part of the last lineup of the group Los que Iban Cantando.

He has been a member of the accompanying bands of various artists, including Jaime Roos, Rubén Olivera, Mauricio Ubal, Jorge Galemire, and Jorge Drexler.

In 2002 the play Murga madre premiered, starring Pinocho Routin and Pitufo. The script was by Pinocho and the direction was by Fernando Toja. The show's music was composed by Pitufo. Murga madre received the Florencio Award for Best Musical Show that year. The soundtrack gave rise to an album, which features the voices of Pinocho and Pitufo, with participation by well-known artists, including Jaime Roos, Hugo and Osvaldo Fattoruso, Luciano Supervielle, Eduardo Méndez, and Urbano Moraes. The show also gave rise to a DVD, recorded at the Solís Theatre. The title song of the play and the album is, in Edú's own opinion, the best that he ever composed.

In 2007 he began his solo career with the release of his first album, Rocanrol. With this he won the Graffiti Awards for Best Composer, Best Uruguayan Popular Music Solo Album, and Theme of the Year (for the song "Rocanrol").

In 2009 his first solo DVD was released, Rocanrol a dos orillas, recorded live in Montevideo and Buenos Aires.

In 2010 Pitufo returned to star in a play with Pinocho Routin, under the direction of Toja: Montevideo Amor. It took place at the El Galpón Theater and starred (besides the two already mentioned) María Mendive and Adriana Da Silva. The soundtrack resulted in a new album.

In 2011, the DVD 30 años de música was released, which includes a show recorded at the Solís Theatre in 2010 (with Liliana Herrero, Fernando Cabrera, and Contrafarsa as guests) and interviews with relatives, acquaintances, and friends.

In 2012 Lombardo released his second solo studio album, Ilustrados y valientes. He was honored with the Graffiti Awards for Best Popular Music Album and Urban Song and Best Composer of the Year.

In Pitufo's solo career, he has accompanied a large number of notable artists in different shows, including Serrat, Lenine, Mercedes Sosa, and León Gieco.

In 2014 he launched the tour "Más Solo Que El Uno", which included concerts in Spain and Denmark, as well as various performances in his home country.

In 2014, the book Bien de al lado. Vida y música de Edú Pitufo Lombardo, written by the journalist Fabián Cardozo, based on interviews with Pitufo and other musicians, was published by the Fin de Siglo Publishing House.

In 2017 Pitufo returned to compete at carnival with the murga Don Timoteo, together with his partner Marcel Keoroglián.

== Discography ==
=== Solo albums ===
- Rocanrol (Montevideo Music Group, 2007)
- Ilustrados y valientes (Montevideo Music Group, 2012)
- Musicos Ambulantes (Montevideo Music Group, 2017)

=== DVDs ===
- Rocanrol a dos orillas (Montevideo Music Group, 2009)
- 30 años de música (Montevideo Music Group, 2011)

=== Albums from theatrical plays (with Pinocho Routin) ===
- Murga madre (Montevideo Music Group, 2002)
- Montevideo Amor (Montevideo Music Group, 2010)
