= Mariana Mota =

Uruguayan judge

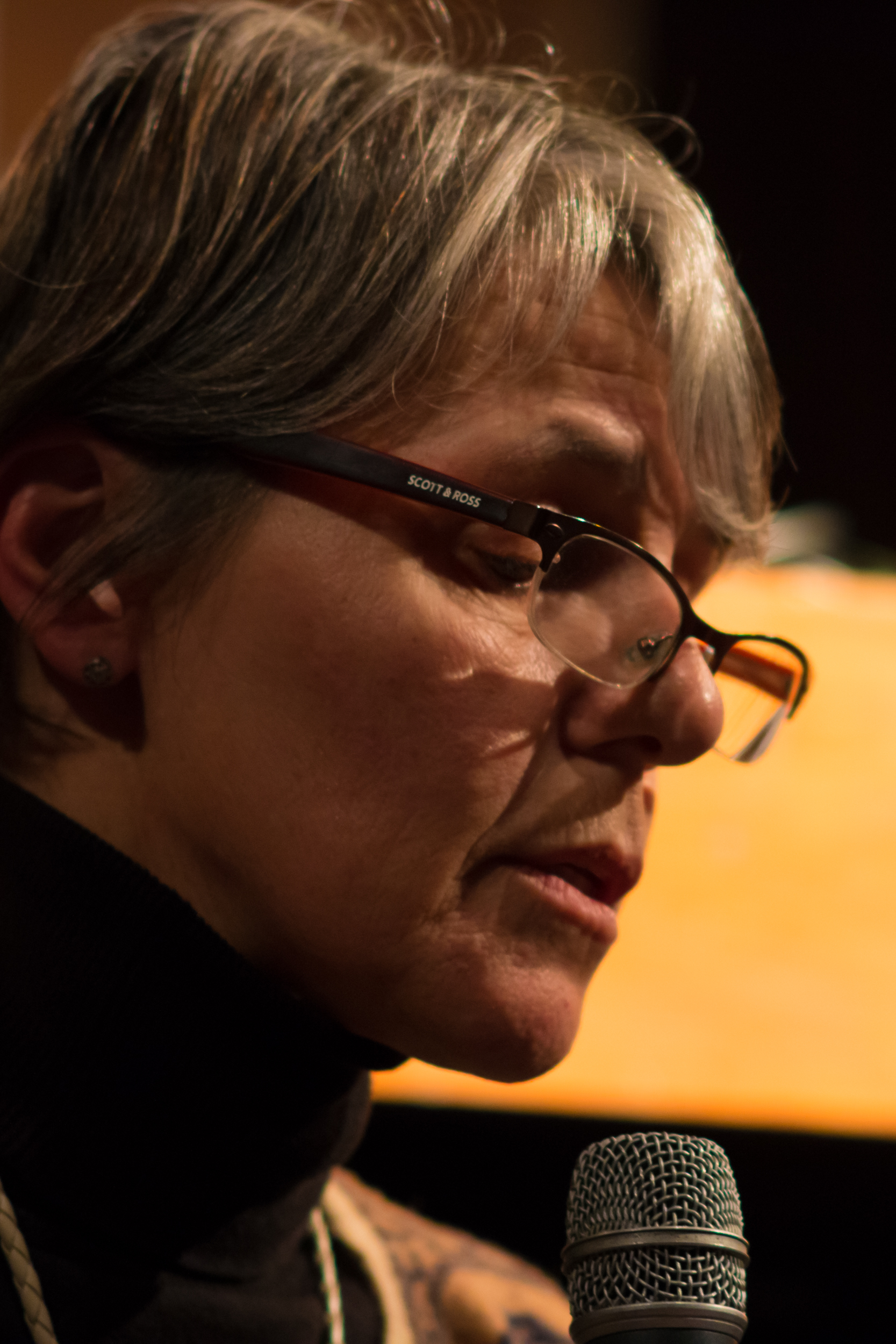

Judge of the First Instance in Criminal Matters of the 7th District of Montevideo

Personal details
- Born: Colonia del Sacramento, Uruguay
- Education: University of the Republic
- Occupation: Judge

Mariana Mota is a Uruguayan judge. She served as a judge on the Criminal Court of First Instance in the 7th district of the city of Montevideo, where she was investigating more than 50 complaints of human rights violations linked to the civil-military dictatorship. In 2010 she condemned former president and dictator Juan María Bordaberry for crimes of attack against the Constitution, forced disappearance of persons, and political murder. She was transferred to a civil court in 2013 by order of the Supreme Court of Justice, which caused a controversy regarding the possible reasons for this transfer, and generated various demonstrations of rejection by human rights organizations. She was appointed to the board of directors of the National Institute of Human Rights on 1 August 2017.

== Biography ==
Mariana Mota was born in Colonia del Sacramento, Uruguay. Her first years were spent in Montevideo. Later she went to live in Paysandú with her parents and two older brothers, where she attended public school and high school. At age 18 she returned to reside in Montevideo, to enter the Faculty of Law of the University of the Republic.

During her years as a law student she was a trade union activist, but not a political militant. She is considered to be a "humanist".

== Action on cases of human rights violations ==
As a criminal judge Mota participated in cases against military figures and civilians accused of crimes committed during the 1973–1984 civic-military dictatorship. She presided over more than 50 complaints based in the Criminal Court of First Instance of the 7th District.

On 9 February 2010, she pronounced sentence condemning former President Juan María Bordaberry as "co-author" of an attack against the Constitution, forced disappearance of persons, and political murder of eleven Uruguayan citizens because:

The rank of the top official of the President of the Republic places him as an official with sufficient hierarchy to (...) provide clarification and to prevent the commission of illicit offenses.

The judge deemed that these were crimes against humanity, under the provisions of Article VI of the Nuremberg principles. In supporting her actions under international human rights law, the judge argued that reference to Law No. 18.831, known as the Expiry Law, was not relevant to this judgment. Regarding the crime of assault on the Constitution, Judge Mota condemned Bordaberry for leading the 1973 coup d'état by dissolving the Parliament through Decree 464/973, a decision that "the Constitution in no way enabled him to take," according to Mota's ruling.

In the same way the Chambers were dissolved, the Parliament was suppressed and with it the legislative function, thus cutting off one of the basic pillars of the democratic system: the most important, the separation of powers.

The conviction was based on article 117 of the Criminal Code. This crime, which would be prescribed after 20 years, could not be tried previously due to the interruption of normal functioning of the rule of law between 1973 and 1985, and for procedural reasons that hindered the judicial process until 2006.

After the ruling in the case of Bordaberry and the declaration of unconstitutionality of the Expiry Law, Mota reactivated other cases that were paralyzed in the 7th Court. This motivated further complaints, making it the criminal court with the greatest number of cases with these characteristics.

During her time as a criminal judge, she had a difficult relationship with the Ministry of Defense, due to what she considered insufficient cooperation with the cases she was investigating. On 27 September 2012 she went to Infantry Battalion No. 13 accompanied by witnesses, to perform a visual inspection of the Army's Material and Armament Service. During the visit, she was prevented from taking photos by a supposed order of Minister Eleuterio Fernández Huidobro. Mota declared that the ministerial authorities were in contempt; finally through an agreement she managed to access the site to take photographs.

For her work in the cases of human rights violations during the dictatorship she won the support of social organizations and left-wing parties, but her work also earned her criticism. Mota did not deny her commitment to the search for truth and the restoration of justice, while discounting any association of her actions with party politics.

My role was: there is a violation of the law, it was never investigated, the perpetrators were never established and the victim was never told what happened. That was what I had to do and I did it as best I could. I know there was a lot of opposition.

== Investigation into disappearance of Air Class flight ==
Judge Mota investigated the case of the Air Class flight that disappeared in the Río de la Plata on 6 June 2012, which occurred in water ten meters deep, 1.5 kilometers southeast of Isla de Flores.

The search for the plane and its crew by the National Navy did not yield results until 20 July, when they found the remains of the ship with the cooperation of Héctor Bado, a specialist in historical shipwrecks. The plane's black boxes, which were found, did not contain the cabin recordings.

After this finding, the judge sent a letter to the Ministry of Defense to resume the search with the participation of Bado, since she considered that the elements found did not allow a complete expert opinion. The defense authorities considered that there were enough elements to determine the causes of the incident. Finally, it was ordered to resume the search in December 2013, although the judge did not obtain new information to continue the investigation until the moment of being transferred to another court, being removed from this and other cases. After another search, other remains of the plane were found, but the bodies of the missing pilot and co-pilot did not appear. Relatives of the crew members continued with the criminal case against the company Air Class, which was finally filed with the 2nd Court of Appeals in 2015.

== Transfer ==
On 13 February 2013, the Supreme Court of Justice (SCJ) informed Mota of its decision to transfer her to a civil court. This communication took Mota by surprise, since she, according to her words, "neither had requested the transfer nor had committed any fault."

Raúl Oxandabarat, spokesman of the SCJ, explained that "Article 99 of Law 15.750 gives the SCJ the power to make use of its human resources without providing explanations," and maintained that the measure did not imply a punishment or sanction against the judge because the transfer from criminal to civil was not equivalent to a degradation of hierarchy. He explained that the court had opened two ongoing investigations related to the judge and that neither had been issued. These cases were for her criticism of the human rights policy of Uruguay in statements to the Argentine newspaper Página/12, and the omission of information requested by the court.

The situation gained notoriety and Judge Mota received expressions of public support at the national and international level. Several public figures (Mirtha Guianze and Washington Beltrán, among others), as well as social and political organizations, expressed consternation and rejection of the decision to remove the judge from the criminal court at a time when she was investigating several cases of human rights violations, in addition to the disappearance of the Air Class plane. Baldemar Tarocco, vice president of Crysol (the association of former political prisoners of Uruguay), stressed that this was not the first transfer of judges who worked in cases related to human rights and the recent past.

On 15 February, the day on which the transfer was completed, a public demonstration took place outside the headquarters of the SCJ, and some protesters were prosecuted for the crime of asonada (unrest), among them the social activists Irma Leites and Álvaro Jaume, and the politician Jorge Zabalza.

The transfer of Mariana Mota was appealed through an administrative request to the SCJ, arguing that the explanations given were insufficient and that the formal measures established for a transfer were not taken correctly. The SCJ replied that although some procedural formalities were not complied with, this did not invalidate the transfer. Subsequently, Mota filed an appeal for annulment before the Administrative Dispute Tribunal for "misuse of power". This was dismissed in a 2015 judgment.

== Appointment to the directorate of the National Institute of Human Rights ==
Mariana Mota was nominated as a candidate to join the board of directors of the National Institute of Human Rights for Mothers and Relatives of Disappeared Detainees, with the support of the PIT-CNT and feminist and human rights organizations. The name of the judge was proposed by the Broad Front in the General Assembly of the Legislature, where she was finally elected along with Wilder Tyler, Mariana Blengio, María Josefina Plá, and Juan Faroppa on 1 August 2017.
