= María Stagnero de Munar =

Uruguayan educator and feminist

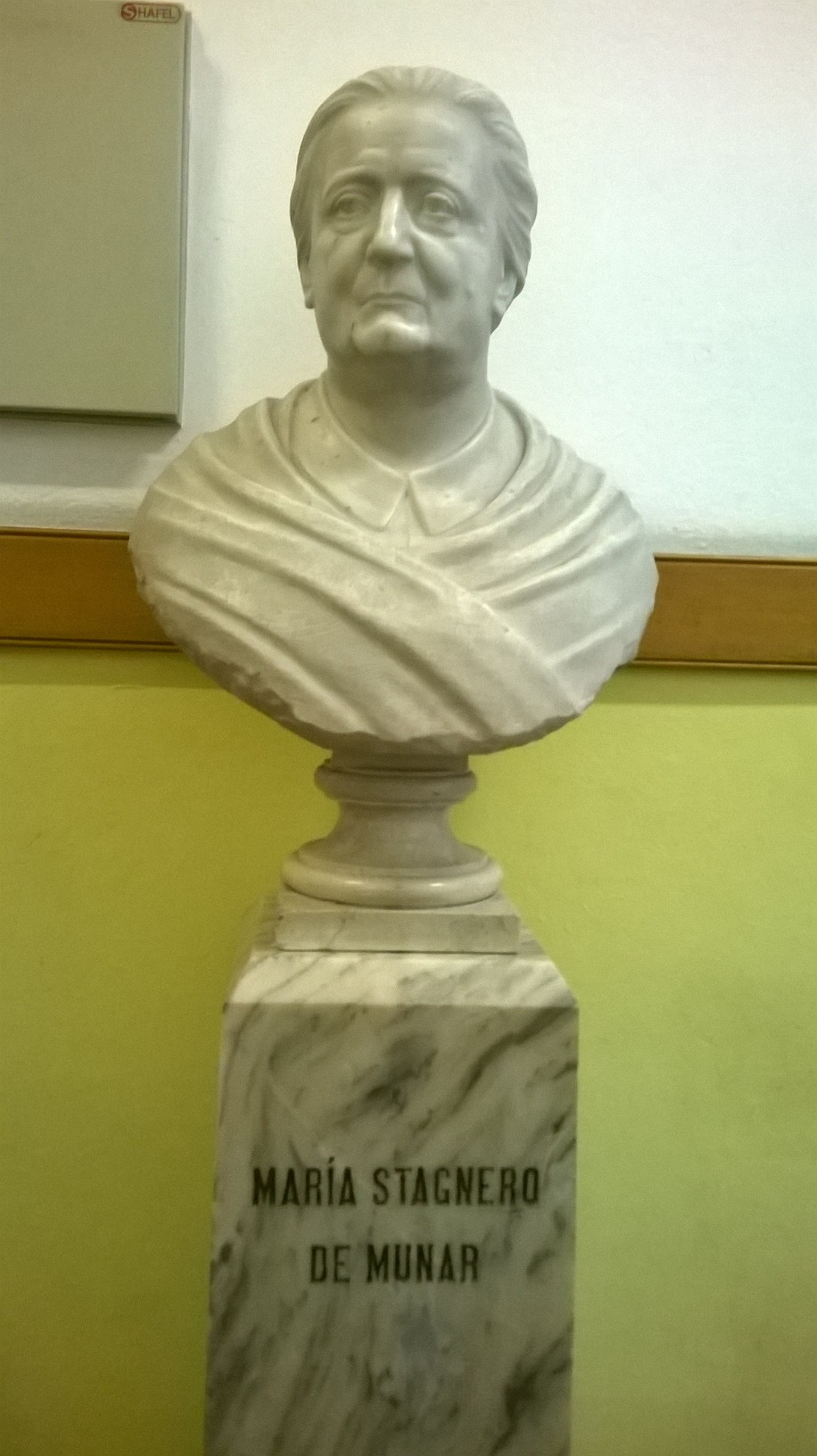
Commemorative bust of María Stagnero de Munar

María Stagnero de Munar (1856–1922) was a liberal Uruguayan teacher and feminist. She was a pioneering player in the reform of the Uruguayan school system in the 1880s, establishing the country's first women's teacher training college, Instituto Normal de Señoritas. In 1916, together with her former students, she formed the National Women's Council of Uruguay.

== Biography ==
Born in Montevideo in 1856, Stagnero was raised in a family with limited resources. As a result, she did not begin her formal school education until she was 12 years old, but thanks to her diligence, she matriculated four years later. In 1872, she took up a position as assistant school mistress. In 1874, she passed the examinations which allowed her to work as a fully qualified primary school teacher.

In 1878, after taking additional evening classes, she was appointed to give a course in grammar and composition at the Sociedad de Amigos de la Educación Popular, following in the footsteps of the influential politician and educationalist José Pedro Varela who had just died. She was the only woman who taught at the institution.

In 1882, she founded and headed what was originally called Internado Normal de Señoritas, a women's teacher training college. It consisted of 15 women students from the Uruguayan provinces, all of whom were boarders. In 1898, after boarding requirements were lifted, it was renamed Instituto Normal de Señoritas and in 1912, in Stagnero's honour, it was given the name Instituto Normal María Stagnero de Munar. She remained principal until 1912. On retirement, she received the title of Benemerita and was made Honorary Principal of the Normal Institute for Girls.

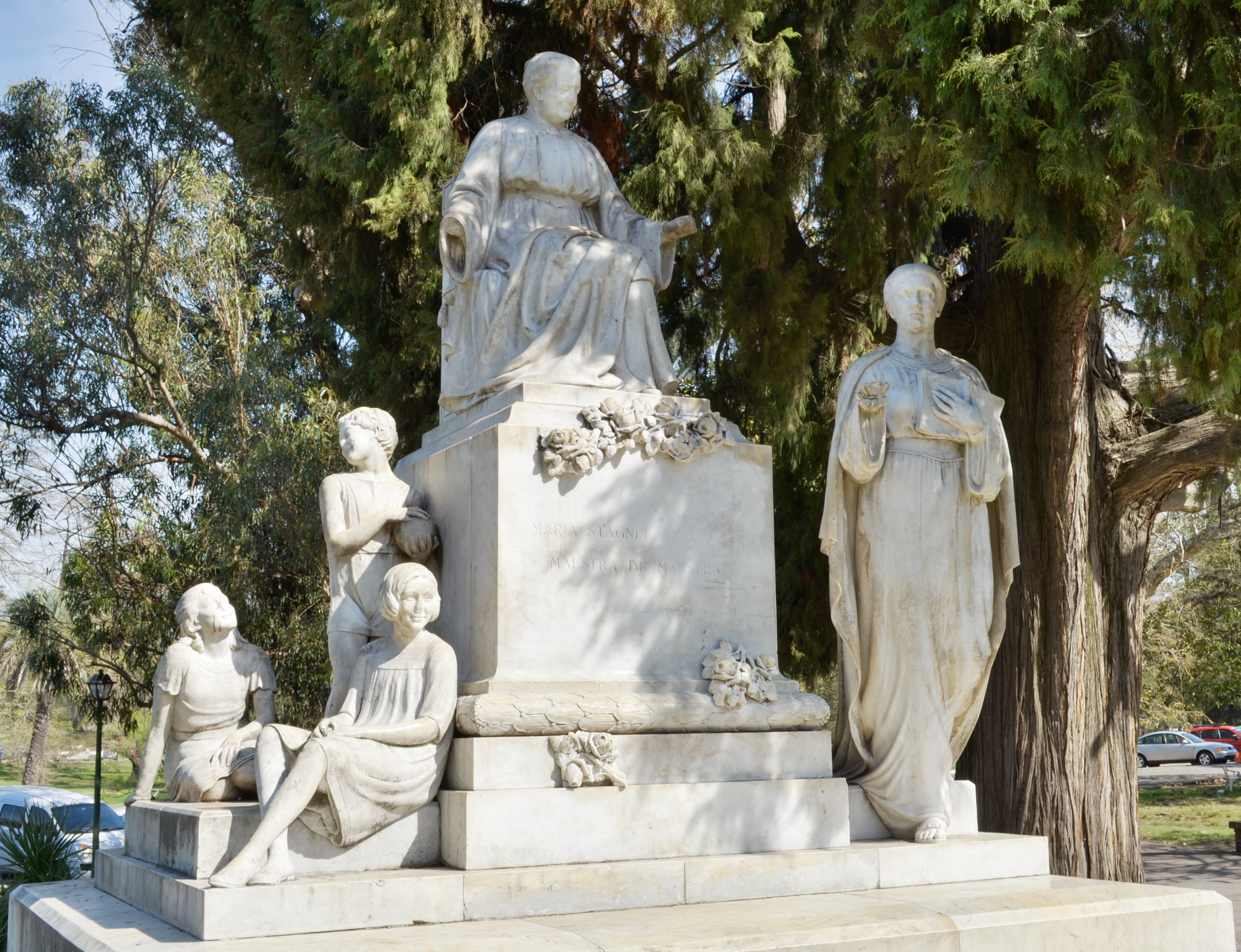
Monument in memory of María Stagnero de Munar

María Stagnero died in Montevideo on 30 August 1922. A monument created in her honour by Juan D'Aniello was unveiled in Montevideo on 14 March 1929.
