= Hugo Rivero =

Uruguayan footballer

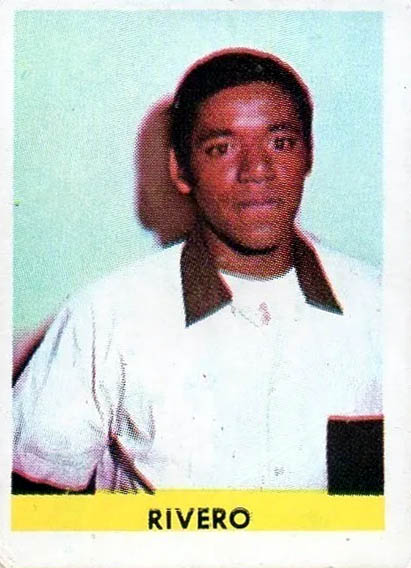
- Rivero with Platense in 1970

Personal information
- Full name: Hugo Rivero Pereira
- Date of birth: 28 August 1950
- Place of birth: Montevideo, Uruguay
- Date of death: 20 October 2026 (aged 76)
- Place of death: Montevideo, Uruguay
- Position: Defender

Senior career*
Years	Team	Apps	(Gls)
1967	Liverpool Montevideo		
1968–1970	Platense	85	(0)
1971–1972	San Lorenzo	18	(0)
1972	Huachipato	25	(2)
1973	Gimnasia La Plata	27	(1)
1974–1977	Huachipato	81	(4)
1978	América de Quito		

International career
1967	Uruguay U20	1	(0)
- * Club domestic league appearances and goals

Hugo Rivero Pereira (born 28 August 1950 – 20 October 2026) was a Uruguayan footballer who played for clubs in Argentina and Chile.

== Teams ==
- (Uruguay) Liverpool 1967
- (Argentina) Platense 1968–1970
- (Argentina) San Lorenzo 1971–1972
- (Chile) Huachipato 1972
- (Argentina) Gimnasia y Esgrima de La Plata 1973
- (Chile) Huachipato 1974–1977
- (Ecuador) América 1978

== International ==
Rivero represented Uruguay at under-20 level in the 1967 South American Championship, making one appearance.

== Death ==
Settled in Barrio Buceo, Montevideo, Rivero died on 20 October 2026, aged 76.

== Titles ==
- San Lorenzo 1972 (Torneo Metropolitano Primera División Argentina Championship)
- (Chile) Huachipato 1974 (Chilean Primera División Championship)
