= Líber Arce =

Uruguayan student killed by police forces

- Born: Líber Walter Arce Risotto; 30 October 1938; Uruguay
- Died: 14 August 1968 (aged 29); Montevideo, Uruguay
- Cause of death: Gunshot
- Resting place: Cementerio del Buceo
- Occupations: Student, activist

Líber Walter Arce Risotto (30 October 1938 – 14 August 1968) was the first student killed by police forces in Uruguay under the government of Jorge Pacheco Areco.

Líber Arce was a student at the Dental Prosthetics School of the University of the Republic's Faculty of Dentistry, and worked at a street market with his parents. He was also a militant of the Dentistry Student Center, the Uruguay Federation of University Students (FEUU), and the Union of Communist Youth (UJC) from the age of 19, with whom he demonstrated for democracy, social justice, and solidarity with peoples fighting for liberation.

== Historical context ==
On 13 June 1968, Swift Security Measures had been decreed by the government, a state of emergency that would be maintained for months.

In the early hours of 9 August, Interior Minister Eduardo Jiménez de Aréchaga – under the orders of Jorge Pacheco Areco – ordered searches of the University of the Republic, the Faculties of Agronomy, Architecture, Psychology, Medicine, and the National School of Fine Arts, with the justification that those places contained weapons and pamphlets violating the security measures then in force. When the students arrived to class they found the disorder and destruction caused by the raids.

The Central Board of the University of the Republic denounced all the damage caused, the theft of teaching material, documentation, and all the files with the students' personal data. Student outrage broke out in the form of daily clashes as a consequence of the violation of university autonomy. The demonstrations were made in inorganic form, in different parts of the city, causing a great strain on the police.

== Mortal wounding ==
At noon on 12 August 1968, a group of dental, medical, nursing, and veterinary students set out from the Faculty of Veterinary Medicine, located on the street then called Larrañaga, on the way to Rivera Avenue. This "lightning demonstration" was intercepted by a police vehicle with an officer and three agents who were present. Officer Enrique Tegiachi fired on the group. There Líber Arce was wounded in the left groin, causing a hemorrhage.

The policemen pointed their revolvers at the students and demanded the presentation of their identity documents. In this way they delayed the transfer of Líber Arce to a health center. Finally, the students managed to reach the Hospital de Clínicas, where Líber Arce was diagnosed with a cut in the left femoral artery at the confluence of the superficial and deep femoral artery in the inguinal region. The loss of blood caused anemia, hypovolemia, and successive cardiac arrests throughout the next day. In spite of everything, the doctors managed to stop the hemorrhage and a vascular graft was performed to repair the artery sectioned by the shot. However, all efforts were in vain. Líber Arce died on 14 August.

== Funeral ==
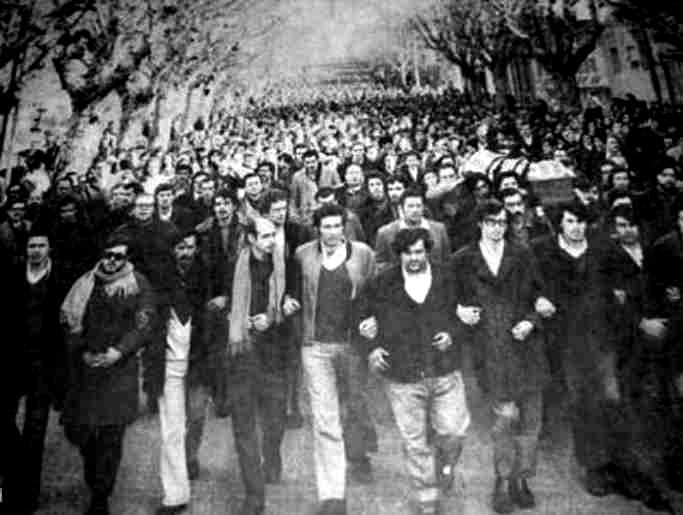
March to the atrium of the University of the Republic, for the viewing of Líber Arce

A viewing was held for Líber Arce in the atrium of the University of the Republic. A crowd accompanied his body to the Cementerio del Buceo, transforming the event into a popular demonstration against government policy. It is estimated that more than a quarter of a million people attended the funeral. Many shops closed in mourning and buses from the state-owned transport company AMDET placed black ribbons on their windshields.

== Further deaths ==
On Friday, 20 September 1968, the police suppressed another demonstration of students against the government policy of Pacheco Areco, opening fire with riot shotguns and killing Susana Pintos (28) and Hugo de los Santos (19).

== Symbol ==
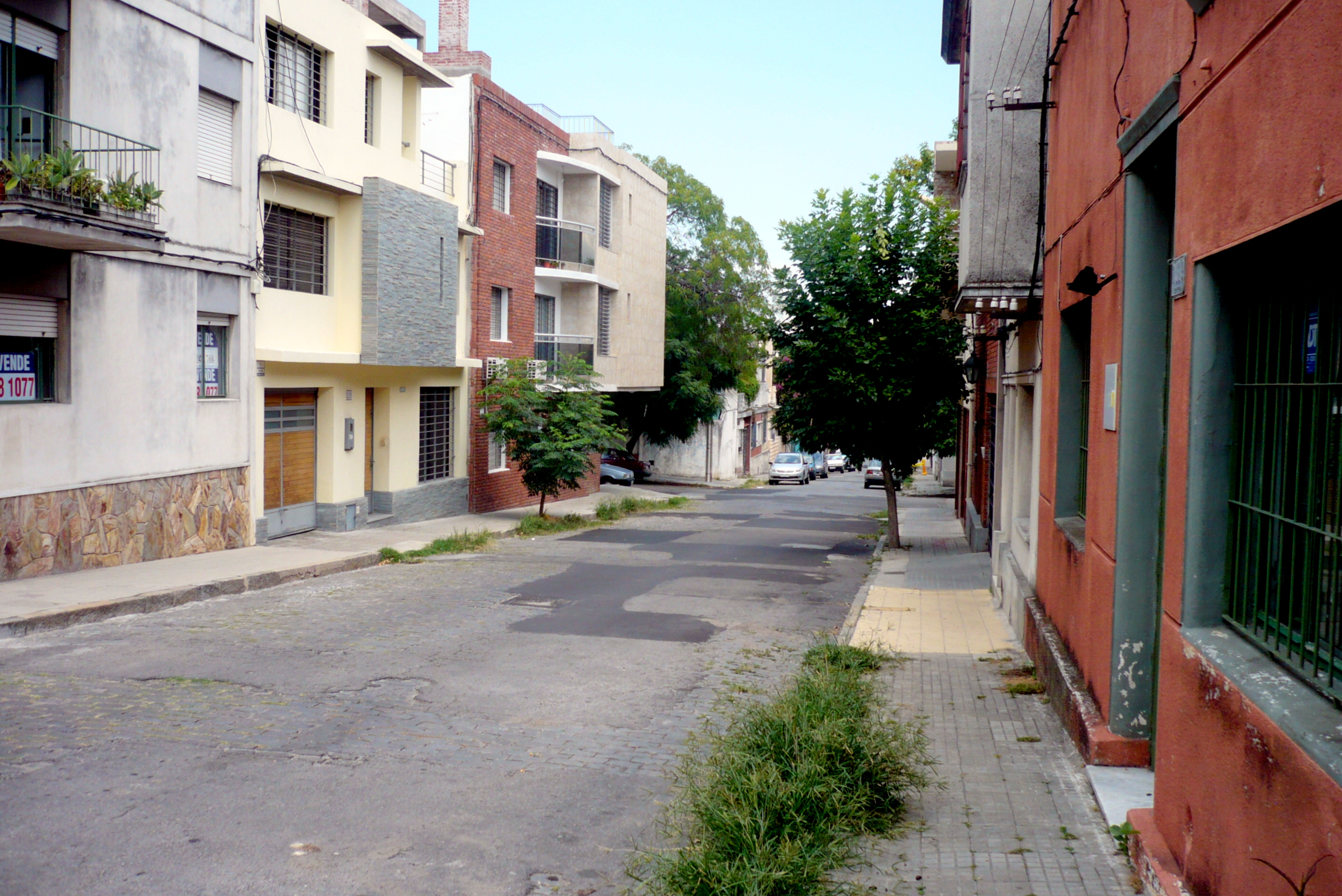
Líber Arce Street, Montevideo

Since 1968, 14 August has been adopted by the Uruguayan student movement (university and secondary) as Student Martyrs Day.

After the return to democracy, General Prim Street (in homage to the Spanish military officer and politician Juan Prim, 1814–1870) was renamed Líber Arce. The street begins at the doors of the Veterinary School and passes behind the municipal zoo of Villa Dolores.
