= Pablo Román Pérez Torres =

Uruguayan translator and interpreter

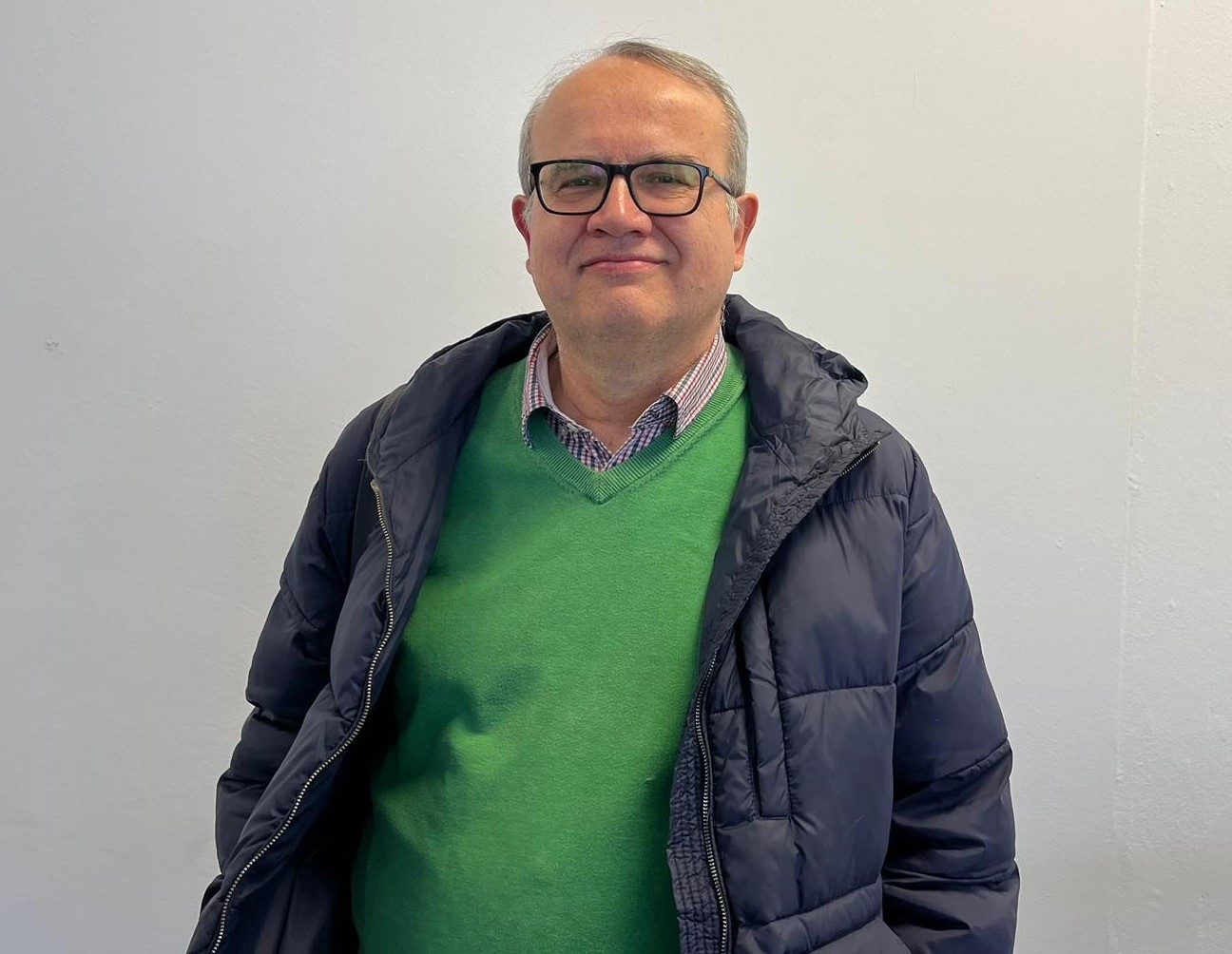
Pablo Román Pérez Torres

Pablo Román Pérez y Torres (born September 20, 1964, in Montevideo, Uruguay) is a Uruguayan translator and interpreter for Spanish, Catalan, German, English, Italian as well as a lecturer at the Sprachen & Dolmetscher Institut Munich. In addition to the Uruguayan citizenship, he also holds Spanish and German citizenship.

== Life ==
Pablo Román Pérez y Torres was born on September 20, 1964, in Montevideo, Uruguay. Due to the political situation, he left for Spain at the age of eight, where he first lived in Valencia and later moved to Barcelona. He began his academic career as a translator and interpreter in 1987 in Germersheim, Germany, graduating in 1993 with a degree in German and Italian and in 1994 with a degree in English. Besides languages, his interests include handball, field hockey and football, which he has played since childhood. He is also very interested in literature, history, and politics.

Pérez Torres showed an interest in languages at an early age. Due to his father's preference for German philosophy and German culture, as well as his enthusiasm for German philosophers, he also discovered passion for the German language, and began learning it at the age of eight. He learned Catalan during his time in Barcelona, especially through the media, television, and radio, thus acquiring a good passive understanding of the language.

== Professional career ==
=== Studies ===
In 1986, he began studying English and Romance languages and literature at the University of Heidelberg. At that time, the native Uruguayan toyed with the idea of becoming a lecturer but broke it off when suggested to do so by an interpreter and translator who gave lectures at his university. Thus, he decided to follow his passion in this field. Pérez Torres gained his first professional experience in translation and interpreting during his studies in form of a part-time job. He also did an internship at Boehringer Mannheim, now Roche, where he also gained his first experience in medicine.

=== Professional beginnings ===
After completing his studies, Pérez Torres worked at König und Bauer Albert in Frankenthal from 1996 to 1998. When the company moved its headquarters to Würzburg, he decided to reorient himself professionally. He received two job offers as a lecturer at language and interpreting institutes, one in Erlangen, the other in Munich. He chose Munich because, in addition to teaching, he could temporarily take over the management of the Spanish department. Worth mentioning during his time as head of the Spanish department is the ERASMUS exchange program with the Spanish university in Alicante (Universitat d'Alacant), which was established.

=== Interpreting assignments ===
==== Football ====
His interpreting assignments are particularly noteworthy. His most famous was probably during the friendly match between Germany and Argentina (final score 0:1) on March 3, 2010, when he interpreted for Argentine national coach Diego Maradona at the post-match press conference. What was particularly curious about this assignment was that Maradona did not recognize the German international Thomas Müller and initially refused to take part in the press conference. However, he subsequently changed his mind and apologized to Müller, allowing Pérez Torres to continue his interpreting assignment as planned.

However, Pérez Torres also had other assignments at the football level. These include a simultaneous interpreting assignment from Catalan into German, in which he simultaneously interpreted Ferrán Torres (FC Barcelona), who was speaking Valencian (a form of Catalan), into German at a press conference in Frankfurt, Germany, in April 2022.

Similarly, he interpreted at player and coach presentations or press conferences before important matches for well-known clubs and Latin American national teams (FC Barcelona, Real Madrid, FC Bayern Munich; Argentina, Chile, Paraguay, Peru, Uruguay) and football personalities (Toni Kroos, Real Madrid; James Rodríguez, FC Bayern Munich, Carlo Ancelotti, Pep Guardiola, Joachim Löw).

There were not only appearances at press conferences, but also appearances on television.

==== Politics ====
In addition to sports, he was also involved in politics as an interpreter. In 1998, he interpreted for former deputy federal FDP chairman Rainer Brüderle when he accompanied him on his delegation trip through Argentina, Chile and Uruguay, during which he acted as a language mediator between Brüderle and former Uruguayan President Julio Maria Sanguinetti, among others.

On the occasion of the visit of former Uruguayan President Tabaré Vázquez to Hamburg in 2017, Pérez Torres also acted as an interpreter into German.

In the course of this, he also interpreted vice versa from German into Spanish during a speech by German entrepreneurs Gerd Hummel (SOWITEC group GmbH) and Karl-Heinz Krämer (Block Foods AG).

== Activity as a translator and lectures ==
On the occasion of the 20th FIT World Congress (Fédération Internationale des Traducteurs - World Translators' Federation), held in Berlin in 2014, Pérez Torres contributed to a book called "Man vs. Machine? - Volume I" and there he created an entry in the section "Translating and interpreting in sports, using football as an example, translatological challenges" and gave a lecture on it. In 2009, he gave a lecture on Uruguay in the Swabian town of Bad Urach for political science students who were to represent Uruguay at the "National Model United Nations" (NMUN conference in New York) as part of their bachelor's degree program at the time. During this lecture, he conducted a workshop for young students, introducing them to the country and people of Uruguay. Previously, he had also given another lecture at the University of Tübingen on the topic of the tensions that existed at the time between Uruguay and Argentina due to the paper mills on the Rio Uruguay and the pollution they caused.
