= Héctor Codevila =

Uruguayan footballer and manager (born 1964)

Personal information
- Full name: Héctor Juan Carlos Codevila Grin
- Date of birth: 23 January 1964 (age 62)
- Place of birth: Montevideo, Uruguay
- Position: Midfielder

Senior career*
Years	Team	Apps	(Gls)
1981–1986	Rampla Juniors		
1987–1988	Deportivo Italiano	4	(1)
1989–1990	Liverpool de Montevideo		
1991–1992	Rentistas		
1992	Deportivo Cuenca		

Managerial career
- 2004–2005: Rampla Juniors
- * Club domestic league appearances and goals

Héctor Codevila (born 23 January 1964 in Montevideo) is a former Uruguayan football player and manager.

== Club career ==
Codevila played for Rampla Juniors, Liverpool de Montevideo and Rentistas in the Primera División Uruguaya. He also played for Deportivo Italiano in the Primera B Nacional Argentina and finished his playing career with Deportivo Cuenca in Serie A de Ecuador.
