= Uriel Trocki =

Uruguayan-Israeli basketball player

Uriel Trocki אוריאל טרוצקי
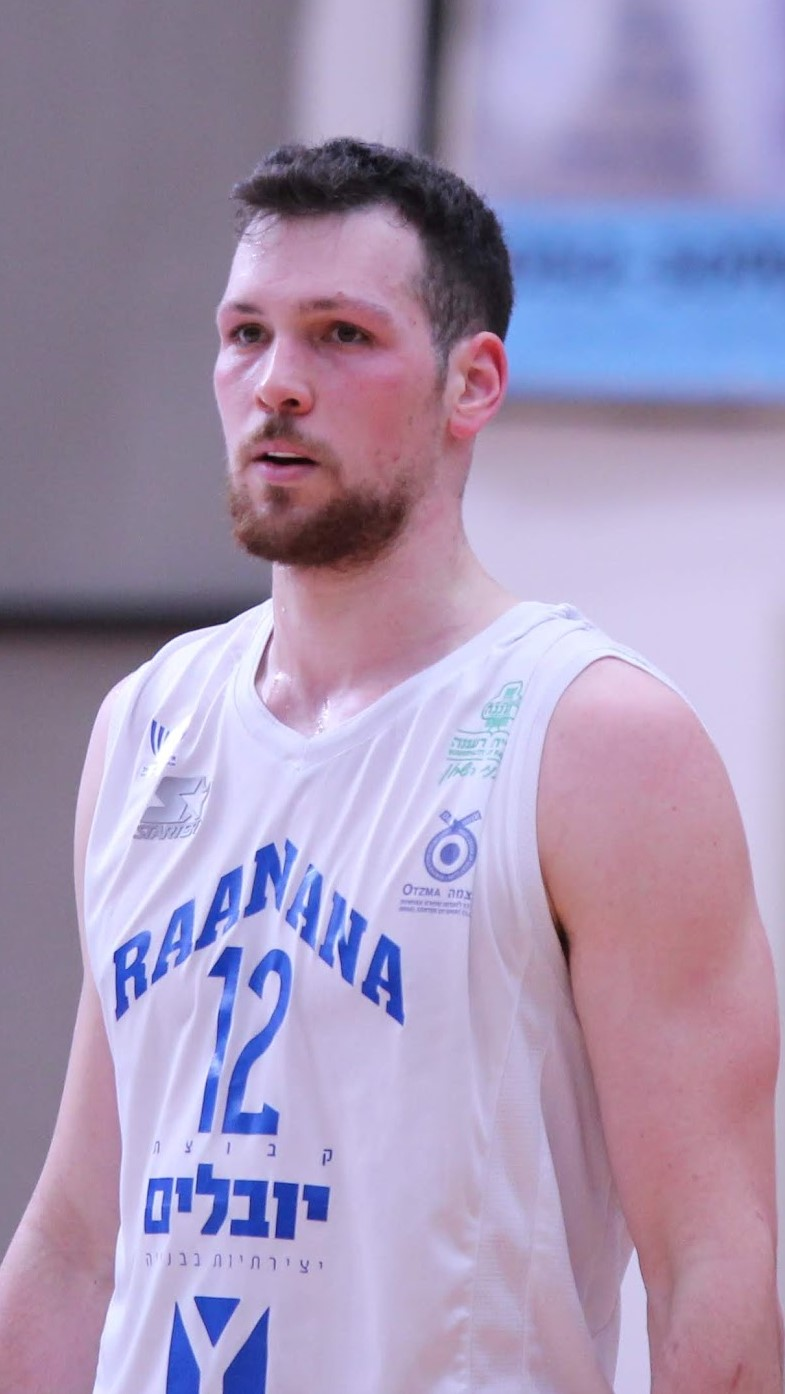

Free Agent
- Positions: Forward and center

Personal information
- Born: November 28, 1996 (age 29) Montevideo, Uruguay
- Listed height: 6 ft 7 in (2.01 m)
- Listed weight: 224 lb (102 kg)

Career history
- 2015–2018: Hapoel Kfar Saba
- 2018–2020: Maccabi Ra'anana
- 2020–2021: Hapoel Holon
- 2021: Ironi Nes Ziona

Career highlights
- FIBA Europe Cup champion (2021)

Uriel Trocki (Hebrew: אוריאל טרוצקי; November 28, 1996) is a Uruguayan-Israeli basketball player who last played for Ironi Nes Ziona of the Israeli Basketball Premier League. He plays the forward and center positions.

== Biography ==
Trocki was born in Montevideo, Uruguay. He is Jewish, and was bar mitzvah in 2010. When he was 13 years old, he and his family immigrated to Israel. His hometown is Kfar Saba, Israel. He is 6 ft 7 in (201 cm) tall, and weighs 224 pounds (102 kg).

== Professional career ==
He played for Hapoel Kfar Saba. Trocki played from 2018 to 2020 for Maccabi Raanana. In 2019-20 he averaged 10.4 points, 6.5 rebounds, and 1.6 assists per game.

In June 2020 Hapoel Holon of the Israeli Basketball Premier League signed Trocki.

On January 1, 2021, he has signed with Ironi Nes Ziona of the Israeli Basketball Premier League.

== National team career ==
Trocki played for the Uruguay national basketball team at the 2019 Pan American Games in Peru.
