= Mario Wschebor =

Uruguayan mathematician (1939–2011)

- Born: Mario Wschebor Wonsever; 3 December 1939; Uruguay
- Died: 16 September 2011 (aged 71); Uruguay
- Occupation: Mathematician
- Spouse: Adela Pellegrino
- Children: Nicolás, Margarita, Isabel
- Awards: Premio Morosoli
- Website: Mario Wschebor

Mario Wschebor Wonsever (3 December 1939 – 16 September 2011) was an Uruguayan mathematician. He earned his degree at the University of the Republic, Uruguay, where he was Dean of the Faculty of Sciences between 1987 and 1997, after actively participating in the process of its creation. Another important contribution from this period was the "Document of the four deans", in which the need to create a national system of tertiary education was laid out.

In the field of mathematics, he made important contributions to the areas of probability and statistics.

Mario Wschebor worked in the Centro de Matemática (Mathematics Centre), and among numerous other activities he was chair of the Centre International de Mathématiques Pures et Appliquées (CIMPA; International Centre for Pure and Applied Mathematics).

In November 2007, Wschebor was awarded the "Morosoli de Oro" prize for Uruguayan cultural personality of the year by the Lolita Ruibal Foundation of Minas, Uruguay.
