= Cementerio del Norte, Montevideo =

Cemetery in Montevideo, Uruguay

Coordinates: 34°50′29″S 56°10′42″W

Cementerio del Norte
- Interactive map of Cementerio del Norte

Details
- Established: 1929
- Location: Burgues 4259; Montevideo
- Country: Uruguay
- Type: municipal
- Owned by: Intendencia de Montevideo

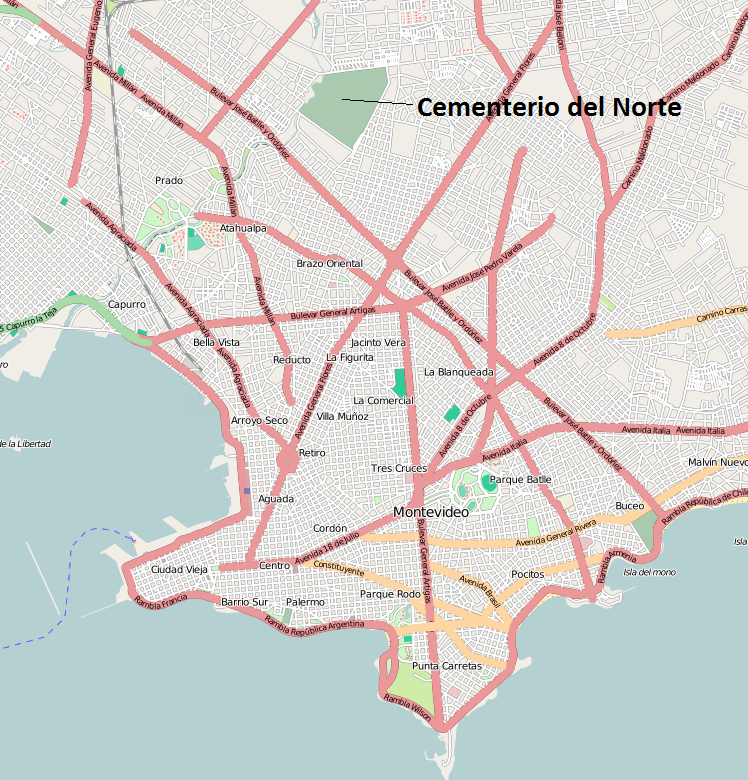
Location in Montevideo

Cementerio del Norte is the largest cemetery in Montevideo, Uruguay, and also the largest green park area of the city. It is located in the barrio of Casavalle in the northern-central part of the city, about 7 kilometres from the centre. To the southwest is Parque Luis Rivero and the barrio of Aires Puros. The barrio of Las Acacias lies to the east.

== History ==
The cemetery was established in 1929. Germans who were killed in battle at sea during World War II are buried in the cemetery.

== Description ==
The cemetery is noted for its circular "coiled" system of grave alignment in the large expanse to the north of the site. There is however a regular burial ground to the southwest of this circular patterned main site.
