= Florencio Award =

Annual awards for Uruguayan theatre

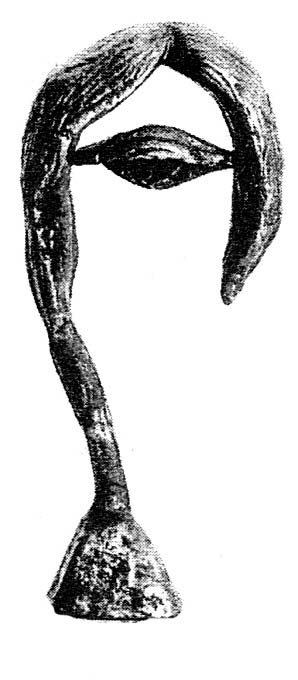
- Awarded for: Excellence in Uruguayan theatre
- Country: Uruguay
- Presented by: Association of Theatre Critics of Uruguay
- First award: 1962; 64 years ago

The Florencio Award is Uruguay’s national theatre awards, presented annually by the Association of Theatre Critics of Uruguay. It recognises outstanding achievement and excellence in Uruguayan theatre and is considered the highest honour for theatrical productions and performances in the country. Founded in 1962, the award was named in honour of playwright Florencio Sánchez.

== History ==
The award was established in 1962 by the Montevideo Circle of Critics, following a proposal by theatre critic Yamandú Marichal. The design of the statuette was commissioned to Spanish-Uruguayan sculptor Eduardo Yepes.

The awards were not presented in 1972. The Montevideo Circle of Critics ceased operations in 1973, following the coup d’état and the establishment of the civic-military dictatorship in Uruguay. In 1980, amid a period of limited political liberalisation, the Uruguayan Section of the International Association of Theatre Critics—later known as the Association of Theatre Critics of Uruguay—revived the awards.
