= List of Uruguayan musicians =

The following is a list of notable Uruguayan musicians and singers.

== Past ==
- César Amaro (1948–2012)
- Francisco Canaro (1888–1964)
- José Carbajal (1943–2010)
- Abel Carlevaro (1916–2001)
- Luis Cluzeau Mortet (1888–1957)
- Ramón Collazo (1901–1981)
- Eduardo Fabini (1882–1950)
- Osvaldo Fattoruso (1948–2012)
- Jorge Galemire (1951–2015)
- Rina Massardi (1897–1979)
- Eduardo Mateo (1940–1990)
- Gerardo Matos Rodríguez (1897–1948)
- Osiris Rodríguez Castillos (1925–1996)
- Guido Santórsola (1904–1994)
- Julio Sosa (1926–1964)
- Héctor Tosar (1923–2002)
- Dinorah Varsi (1939–2013)
- Alfredo Zitarrosa (1936–1989)

== Present ==
- Ethel Afamado (born 1940)
- Alejandro Balbis
- Washington Benavides
- Mario Carrero
- Jorge Drexler
- Francisco Fattoruso
- Hugo Fattoruso
- Eduardo Fernández
- Julio Frade
- Enrique Graf
- Mariana Ingold
- Eduardo Larbanois
- Pitufo Lombardo (born 1966)
- Martín López
- Leo Maslíah
- Martín Méndez
- Pablo Minoli
- Luciana Mocchi (born 1990)
- Numa Moraes
- Malena Muyala
- Samantha Navarro
- Gustavo Núñez
- Roberto Perera
- Álvaro Pierri
- Renée Pietrafesa
- Rubén Rada
- Federico Ramos
- Alberto Reyes
- Jaime Roos
- Gabe Saporta
- Marco Sartor
- Erwin Schrott
- Pablo Sciuto
- José Serebrier
- Dani Umpi
- Daniel Viglietti
- Gonzalo Yáñez

== See also ==
- List of Uruguayans
- Lists of musicians
