= América Invertida (album) =

Compilation album by various artists
- Released: 2019
- Genre: Leftfield pop, World Music
- Label: Vampisoul, Little Butterfly Records

América Invertida is a compilation album released on November 12, 2019, by the Spanish label Vampisoul in collaboration with the Montevideo-based label Little Butterfly Records. Its title is inspired by the famous painting of the same name by Uruguayan artist Joaquín Torres García. The compilation brings together a selection of recordings originally produced in Uruguay during the 1980s—a period when a diverse, experimental local scene blended singer-songwriting, jazz fusion, folk, electronic music, and Afro-Uruguayan rhythms. The tracklist includes works by Contraviento, Jaime Roos with Estela Magnone, Hugo Jasa, Eduardo Mateo, La Escuelita, Mariana Ingold, Fernando Cabrera, Leo Maslíah with Jorge Cumbo, and Travesía. The project was curated by Spanish DJ and collector Javi Bayo, with extensive liner notes written by Uruguayan music journalist and critic Andrés Torrón. By compiling tracks that had been largely overlooked outside Uruguay, the album renewed international interest in a scene long overshadowed by the more prominent musical industries of neighboring Argentina and Brazil. In retrospective reviews and end-of-year lists, América Invertida has been described as a “treasure chest” of “glittering diamonds” and “a rediscovery and resurrection of a unique chapter in Río de la Plata’s musical history.”

== Track listing ==
1. Contraviento – Desencanto
2. Jaime Roos & Estela Magnone – Tras tus ojos
3. Eduardo Darnauchans – De los relojeros
4. Hugo Jasa – Kabumba
5. Eduardo Mateo – El Chi-Li-Ban-Dan
6. Travesía – En este momento
7. Mariana Ingold – Capítulos
8. La Escuelita – Llamada insólita
9. Hugo Jasa – Y el tiempo pasa
10. Leo Maslíah & Jorge Cumbo – Bombinhas
11. Fernando Cabrera – A ustedes
