= Pablo Sciuto =

Pablo Sciuto songwriter and poet from Uruguay

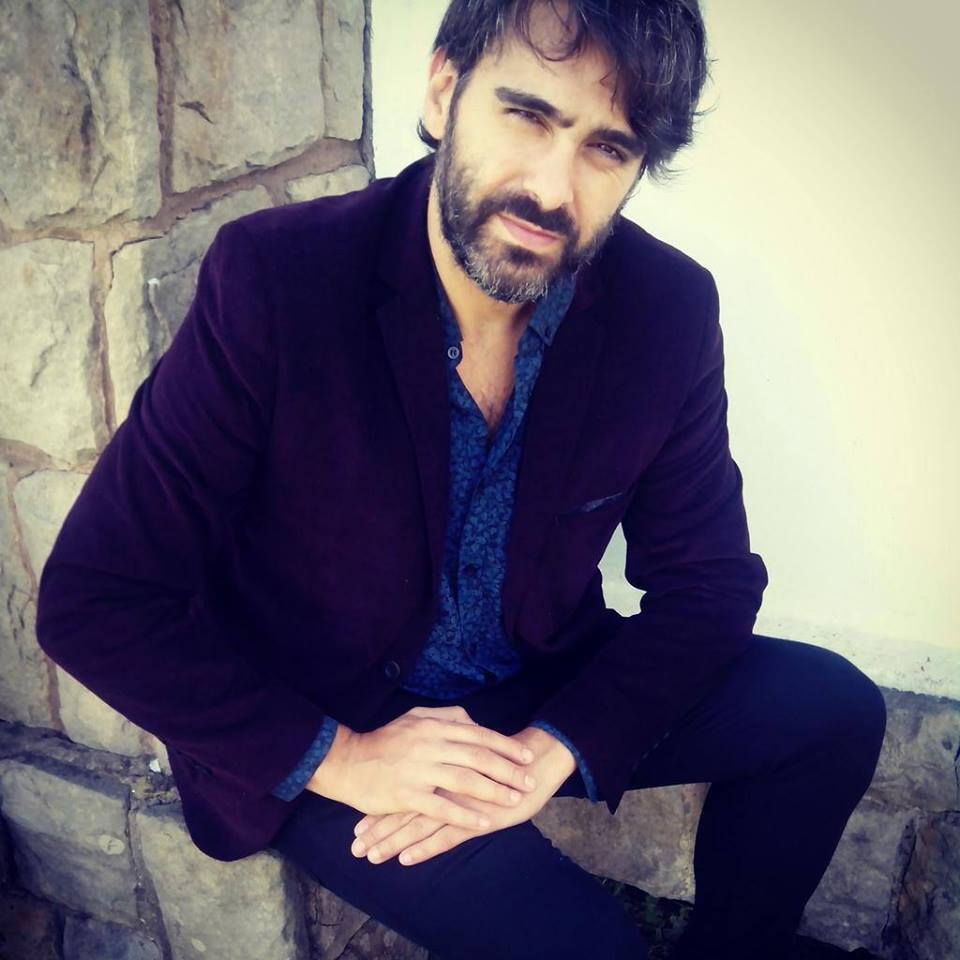

Background information
- Born: Pablo Fernando Sciuto Silva; May 12, 1979 (age 47)
- Origin: Montevideo, Uruguay
- Genres: Songwriter, Record producer, Poet, Pop, Electronic Music
- Occupations: Musician, Composer, VJ
- Instruments: Guitar, Vocals, Drums, Bass
- Years active: 1996 - Present
- Labels: Hipnótica Records, Boomerang Records, Laberinto Records, Producciones Acaraperro
- Website: Official Site

Pablo Sciuto is a Uruguayan musician, composer, poet and record producer born in the city of Montevideo, with twelve released albums where he combines rhythms like “Indie Pop”, Jazz, Bossa Nova and Candombe with an electronic sound. He's created a very particular style and has positioned himself in the wave of new creators of Rio de La Plata. At the present time Pablo lives in the city of Madrid, Spain since the year 2000.

== Career ==
His beginnings were in his hometown of Montevideo, where since 1995 he began participating in various bands such as “Escape” (Hard Rock) and “Luz del Alba” (Pop Fusion) teaming up with his good friend Javier Gras, with whom they played cover songs by Eduardo Mateo in small venues. In 1997 he began his solo career with small appearances at the “Hot Club” in Montevideo, sharing the stage with artists such as Erika Herrera, Leo Anselmi and Fernando Henry among others. In 1998 he takes a big leap over to Buenos Aires, performing in various venues in the port city circuit.

He has performed and collaborated with artists such as Machi Rufino, Leo Minax, Jorge Drexler, Pablo Guerrero, Ana Prada, Gustavo Pena “Príncipe”, Jorge Barral, Rita Tavares, Tancredo, Habana Abierta, Daniel Drexler, Gabriela Torres, Carlos Chaouen, Pippo Spera, Tontxu, Mercedes Ferrer, Jorge Galemire, Samantha Navarro, Cristina Narea, Javier Paxariño, La Tercera Republica, Adrián Sepiurca, Alex Ferreira, Pedro Moreno and Evaldo Robson among others.

In his recording studio in Madrid, he experiments with a diversity of instruments, resulting in an enriching combination between electronic and acoustic sounds. His lyrics are influenced by metaphysics, science fiction and astronomy of which he is very fond of. He has ventured in various musical genres, from Jazz, Bossa Nova, Candombe, Folk, Funk, Pop, Electronic, etc. He's created a very particular style and has positioned himself in the wave of new creators of Rio de La Plata. At the present time Pablo lives in the city of Madrid, Spain since the year 2000.

He performs throughout Spain either solo as a multi-instrumentalist who uses live sampling and looping or in a group context at such Madrid clubs as Libertad 8, Clamores, and Galileo Galilei. He has served as a VJ for artists such as soprano Pilar Jurado and Leo Minax.

In 2009, Pablo puts together a new band formation, “Astronomos Urbanos” where renowned musicians of various countries have played a part, such as Fabián Miodownic (Drums, Uruguay), Carlos Maeso (Bass, Spain), Sebastián Crudeli (Piano, Argentina), Matías Nuñez (Bass, Argentina), Álvaro Genta Cubas (Guitar, Uruguay), Olmo Sosa (Guitar, Argentina), Adrián Carrio (Piano, España), Ernesto J. Espinoza (Violin, Chile), Martín Muollo (Bass, Argentina) and Ignacio Rodríguez (Drums, Argentina).

In November 2011 he records his most introspective album yet, “Las Ideas del Aire”. A live recording without any additional tracks, recorded at Estudio Brazil in Madrid with Javier Ortiz. This live recording is also filmed on video and is directed by the Argentinean director of photography Gabriel Di Martino.

In December 2020 he performed at the Palacio de Linares in Madrid to sing in "Música en Palacio" cycle of the renowned Ibero-America cultural institution Casa América.

In 2024, he was invited by the renowned Spanish director and writer David Trueba to perform the theme song for the film Always Winter, an adaptation of Trueba's novel Blitz. The song was composed by Maika Makovski with lyrics by David Trueba. Siempre es invierno is a lighthearted romantic comedy-drama starring David Verdaguer, Amaia Salamanca, Isabelle Renauld, and others.

== Discography ==
- Citylandia (Laberinto Records, 1998)
- La Llave del Cielo (Laberinto Records, 2000)
- Tres Corazones (Bommerang Discos, 2004)
- On (Hipnótica, 2009)
- On Edición Especial (Hipnótica, 2010)
- Huella Sin Fin EP (Hipnótica, 2011)
- Las Ideas del Aire (Hipnótica, 2011)
- Planeta Casa (Hipnótica, 2012)
- El Gran Diseño EP (Hipnótica, 2013)
- La Piel y la Huella (Hipnótica, 2014)
- Variadas Emociones (Hipnótica, 2016)
- Fronteras (En directo, Hipnótica, 2018)
- La Pausa de los Ojos (Hipnótica, 2019)
- De Montevideo a La Habana (With the Cuban singer-songwriter Ismael de la Torre) (Hipnótica, 2020)
- Toque a su Riesgo (Hipnótica, 2023)

=== Singles ===
- El Virus de la Ignorancia (Hipnótica, 2020)
- Montevideo Swing (Hipnótica, 2020)
- Postales de Cristal (Hipnótica, 2020)
- Acariciando Cádiz (Hipnótica, 2020)
- La Fragilidad del Tiempo (Hipnótica, 2019)
- La Brevedad Glacial, Feat: Machi Rufino (Hipnótica, 2019)
- Horizonte de Sucesos (Hipnótica, 2019)
- Canción Azul (Hipnótica, 2019)
- Cataclismo (Hipnótica, 2018)
- Le Llaman Tierra (Hipnótica, 2017)
- Dinámica Fluvial (Hipnótica, 2016)

=== Other Proyects ===
- Texturas del Alma (Audiobook of poetry with music by Martín Lemos. 2020)
- Laurel Street - Laurel Street (Hipnótica, Producciones Acaraperro, 2014)

=== Compilations ===
- Cantigas de Mayo, 2003 (with Chavela Vargas and other artists)
- Cantigas de Mayo, 2005 (with Quimi Portet and other artists)

=== As Producer, Engineer and Arranger ===
- Ingrid Da - Silent Spy (2017) - Artistic production, acoustic guitar, electric guitar, 12 string guitar, bass, choirs, lap steel, harmonica, percussion, programming, hammond, synthesizers, effects and environments.
- Jorge Flaco Barral - UyyyUyUy (2016) - Choirs.
- Orlis Pineda - Baracoa yo te canto (2016) - Choirs. Recording engineer and analog mastering.
- Alexandra Gavrila - Air (2016) - Artistic production, arranger, guitarist, recording engineer, mixing and mastering.
- Muerdo - Viento Sur (2016) - Recording engineer, percussion by Martín Bruhn and violins.
- Abba Suso - King Dragon (2015) - Analog mastering.
- Duende Josele - La Semilla (2015) - Choirs on the Positive theme. Recording engineer
- Desinstrumentados - Various Artists (2015) - Analog mastering.
- Orlis Pineda - Revolucionando (2015) - Artistic production, guitars, choirs and effects.
- Sepiurca Zukin - Re Yo (2015) - Recording guitar of 12 strings in Re Yo. Recording engineer
- Steen Rasmusen Quintento - Presença (feat. Paulo Braga, Leo Minax and Joyce) (2015) - Spanish guitar recording engineer in Melankolia.
- Diego Mattarucco - Musiloquios (2015) - Artistic production, guitars, choirs and programming.
- Alfredo Padilla - Confesiones Salvajes (2015) - Artistic production, guitars, choirs, lap steel, effects and environments.
- Paula de Alba - Distancias Cortas (2015) - Artistic production, guitars, choirs and synthesizers.
- JP Would - Basement Letters (2015) - 12-string guitar, recording engineer, mixing and mastering.
- Laurel Street - Laurel Street (2014) - Artistic production, guitars and choirs.
- Titi Cundekas'on - Crudo (2014) - Guitars and choirs.
- Cristian Navarra - Besos a la Sombra (2013) - Arrangement of the introduction of the theme Kisses in the shade.
- Ernesto Espinoza - Nos Atañe (2013) - Artistic production, guitars, lap steel and choirs.
- Manuel Cuesta - La Vida Secreta de Peter Parker (2009) - Choirs.
- Javi Martín - Nunca es Tarde (2005) - Artistic production, harmonica, guitars, choirs and programming.
- Autobombo (Gustavo Pena Casa Nova "El Príncipe") (1999) - Recording and choirs in Hush.

== Videoclips ==
- Grietas (song included in "La Pausa de los Ojos", Hipnótica Producciones, directed by Pablo Sciuto, Direction of photography: Mercedes Cubas.)
- Acariciando Cádiz (song of the single "Acariciando Cádiz", Hipnótica Producciones, directed by Pablo Sciuto, Direction of photography: Mercedes Cubas and Pablo Sciuto.)
- Postales de Cristal (song of the single "Postales de Cristal". Hipnótica Producciones, directed by Mercedes Cubas)
- La Brevedad Glacial (song of the single "La Brevedad Glacial", Hipnótica Producciones, directed by Pablo Sciuto, Direction of photography: Mercedes Cubas.)
- Horizonte de Sucesos (song of the single "Horizonte de Sucesos", Hipnótica Producciones, directed by Pablo Sciuto, Direction of photography: Mercedes Cubas.)
- Canción Azul (song of the single "Canción Azul", Hipnótica Producciones, directed by Pablo Sciuto, Direction of photography: Mercedes Cubas.)
- Cataclismo (song of the single "Cataclismo", Hipnótica Producciones, directed by Pablo Sciuto, Direction of photography: Mercedes Cubas.)
- Botero (song included in "Fronteras." Hipnótica Producciones. Director: Pablo Sciuto)
- Dinámica Fluvial (song included in "Variadas Emociones." Hipnótica Producciones Direction: Mercedes Cubas.)
- Bajo el mismo sol (song included in "La Piel y La Huella." Hipnótica Producciones.)
- Podrás (song included in "El Gran Diseño EP." Hipnótica Producciones and Casa Sonora.)
- Planeta Casa (song included in "Planeta Casa", directed by Pablo Sciuto for Estudio Cranearte.)
- Huella Sin Fin (song included in "Planeta Casa", address of Montaña Pulido and Pablo Sciuto for Estudio Cranearte.)
- Extraño Método de Amar (song included in "On") Directed by Danilo Lavigne and César Sodero, we will be such Happy Productions.)
- 7 AM (song included in "Las Ideas del Aire." Directed by Pablo Sciuto for Cranearte Studio)
- Más (song included in "Las Ideas del Aire." Directed by Pablo Sciuto for Estudio Cranearte)
- Vidrio Roto (song included in "La Piel y La Huella EP." Directed by Javier Sánchez Salcedo)
- Sincronizados (song included in "Las Ideas del Aire." Directed by Danilo Lavigne.)
- Paisaje (song included in "On" Hipnótica Producciones.)
- Nace (song included in "On" Hipnótica Producciones.)
- Tiempo (song included in "On" Hipnótica Producciones.)

== Cinema and Advertising ==
- Room for Rent. Year: 2017. Director: Fernando Simarro. Company: Halloween Films. Cast: China Patino, Silvia Casanova and Fernando Colomo. Format: Short. Labors: Creation of environments, audio modeling and special effects.
- The Island. Year: 2016 Director: Marco Ferraris. Format: Experimental Cinema. Labors: Creation of environments, audio modeling and special effects.
- Something Good Wake up. Year: 2015 Company: IKEA Ibérica Format: Advertising. Work: Artistic production, mixing and mastering.
- Led, Led, Led. Year: 2014 Company: IKEA Ibérica Format: Advertising. Work: Composition of original music and artistic production.
