= Diego Janssen =

- Born: December 19, 1981 (age 43) Montevideo, Uruguay
- Genres: Candombe; Jazz fusion; Rock
- Occupation(s): Guitarist, songwriter, multi-instrumentalist
- Instrument(s): Guitar, bass
- Years active: 2008–present
- Website: http://www.diegojanssen.com/

Diego Janssen (born December 9, 1981, in Montevideo) is a Uruguayan guitarist, composer and record producer.

His debut album 'El hijo de' was nominated for the Premios Graffiti, the Uruguayan equivalent of the Grammys. Critics have called 'El Hijo De' one of Uruguay's best albums of the decade - breaking ground for a new evolution of candombe. He has been awarded a Uruguayan National Music Award twice in the jazz fusion category.

As a composer he does not cling to any particular style, although there's a clear tendency to experimentation and the fusion of elements of Uruguayan roots music (candombe, tango, folklore), as well as the influence of his time in the studio as a producer and his academic studies in music and technology.

== Early life ==
A self-taught guitarist he started playing rock, pop and Uruguayan folklore as a teenager. His early influences included The Beatles and Nirvana, Uruguayan stars of candombe Jaime Roos and Totem and the flamenco guitarist, Paco de Lucía.

He formed his first rock fusion band in 2000 and at the same time he decided to drop out of college where he was studying engineering to dedicate himself full-time to music. He began a degree in composition at the University School of Music in Montevideo and in parallel studying sound, acoustics and recording studio design.

== Musical career ==
Since 2008 as a producer he has recorded and produced more than thirty albums in Uruguay, Brazil and Argentina. He's hands-on, participating or leading production, recording, mixing and / or mastering, and at times as a session musician. In 2016 he was nominated for Best Producer in the Premios Graffiti for his work on the album 'Nidal' by dark rock band Buenos Muchachos.

During this period he participated as guitarist in a number of bands including Trelew, Damián Gularte, Ojos del Cielo and Sebastián Jantos. And at the same time he deepened his exploration of roots music from Uruguay, and elsewhere in Latin America and North America.

In 2010 as part of the duo Afrosambas with percussionist José 'Pepe' Martínez, he recorded a set of instrumental versions of compositions by Baden Powell, Astor Piazzolla, Pink Floyd and Eduardo Mateo.

His debut solo album 'El Hijo de' won critical acclaim as well as a nomination for the Premios Graffiti in 2016 in the category Candombe Fusion.

The album is an instrumental journey of experimentation and changing sound climates, where elements coming from across the world collide. Blues rock and jazz meet contemporary candombe and milonga, going through both psychedelic and other more manic moments, generating a tribal feeling from a modern optic.

El Hijo de received support from FONAM, the Uruguayan fund for music.

== Discography ==
- Afrosambas (2010)
- El Hijo de (2016)
