= Minoli =

Minoli is an Italian surname. Notable people with this surname include:

- Pablo Minoli (born 1970), Uruguayan composer, guitarist, and music producer
- Renzo Minoli (1904-1965), Italian fencer

Minoli is also a Sri Lankan and Japanese first name and middle name. Notable people with this first name include:

- Minoli Salgado, Malaysian-born British writer and academic.
