= Alvaro Salas =

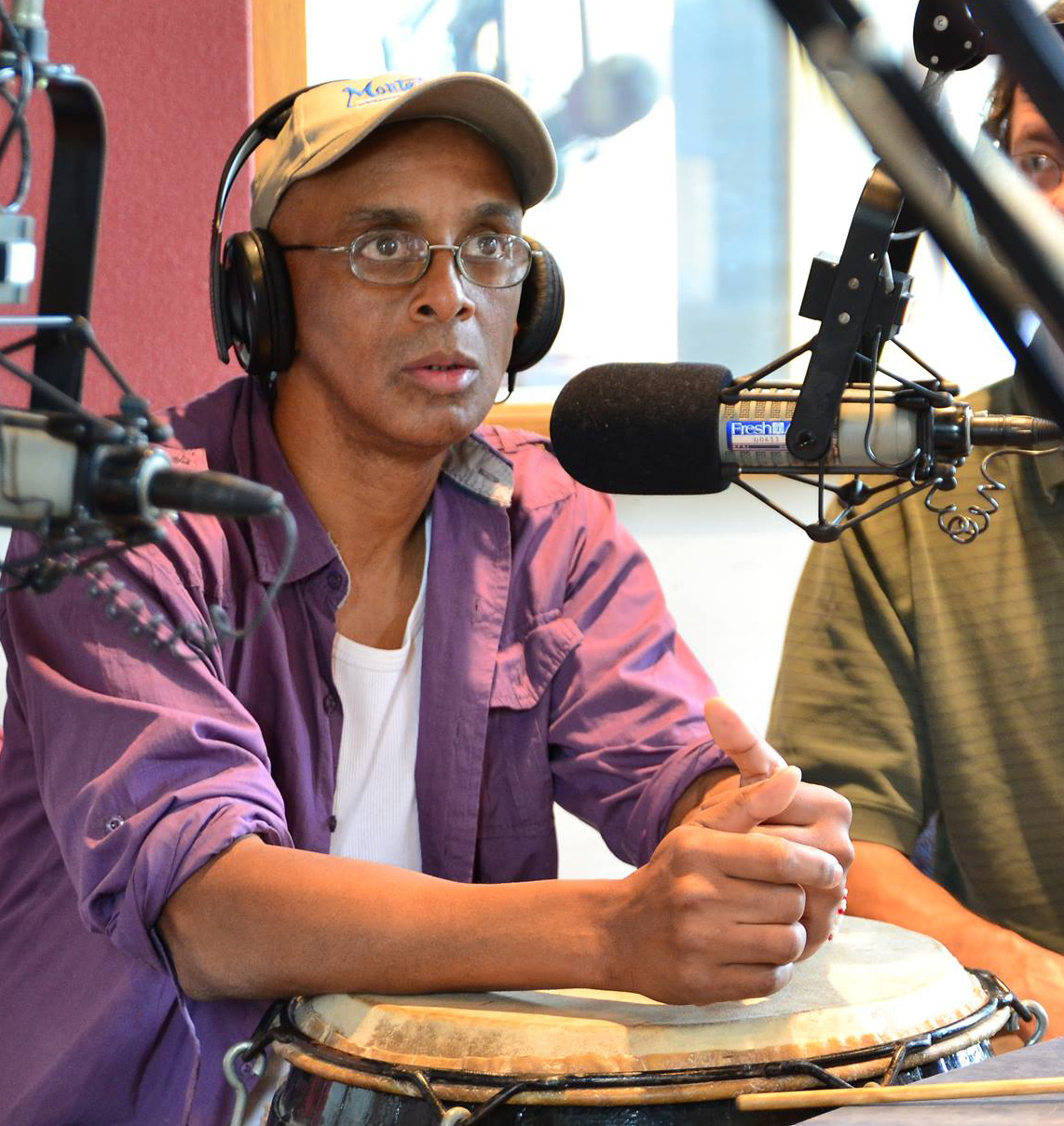

Background information
- Born: Alvaro Salas Gularte; 25 May 1953 (age 73); Montevideo, Uruguay
- Genres: Candombe, Latin jazz, world music
- Occupations: percussionist and educator
- Instruments: tamboriles, Drums, bongos, congas and timbales

Alvaro Salas (born May 25, 1953 in Montevideo, Uruguay) is a Uruguayan Master Candombe drummer and percussion teacher.

== Early life ==
Salas was born in Ansina, a neighbourhood in Palermo, Montevideo.

== A Career in music industry ==
Salas has worked, both live and on records, with a number of musicians, including Eduardo Mateo, Jorginho Gularte, Roberto Galletti, Federico Britos, and Urbano Moraes. He has also worked as a percussionist, arranger, and director with several award-winning Carnival groups including Marabunta, Sueno del Buceo, Vendaval, and others. He is the current Director of the Afro-Uruguayan social organization Mundo Afro. As well, he runs the musical school in this institution, which has international prestige. In 2018, he worked with Kamba Kuá in celebrating afro-Paraguayan identity at the "Agustin Pio Barrios" music school at the new Municipal Art Institute (IMA, in Spanish). He demonstrates the interaction between the typical percussive family of candombe, consisting of what are known as the piano, chico and repique drum.

== See also ==
Candombe
