= Poesia =

Poesia may refer to:

- Poesia (magazine), an Italian-language poetry magazine
- Poesia, a 2015 album by Joyce
- 946 Poësia, a Themistian asteroid
- MSC Poesia, a cruise ship owned and operated by MSC Cruises
- POESIA, a programming language for Siemens 2002 computers
- Letras & Poesía, a Spanish-language literary website
