= Mariana Ingold =

Uruguayan musician

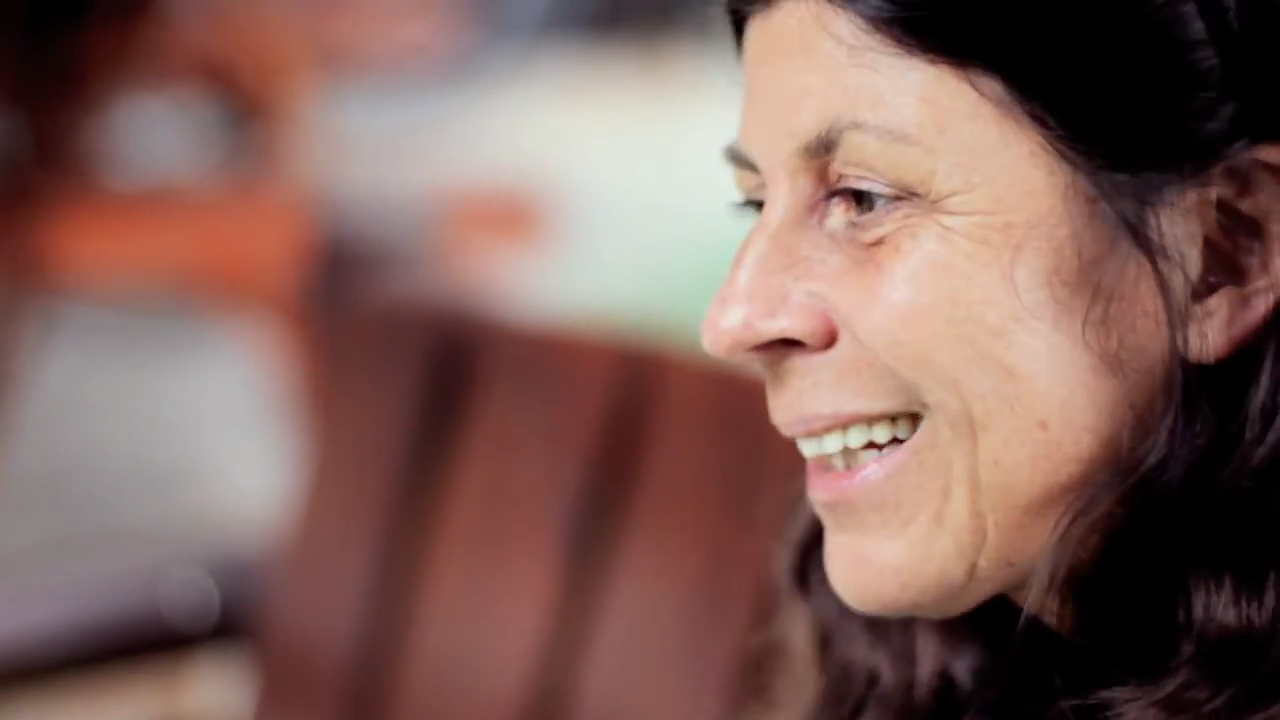
Mariana Ingold in Botija de mi País

Mariana Ingold (born 1958) is a composer, instrumentalist, singer and teacher belonging to the movement of Uruguayan music, Mariana has been active as an artist since 1977 in Uruguay and internationally.

Mariana has recorded dozens of records of songs, music for children and instrumental music. She has composed music for theater presentations as well as for many educational videos of Uruguay, Brazil, the United States and Spain, receiving various prizes in recognition of her work.

Well known in her country for her involvement with environmental organizations, Mariana has the honor to be the godmother of OCC (Organization of Conservation of the cetaceans (whales and dolphins) of the South Atlantic and the River de la Plata).

She has made a recording of her children songs ("El Planeta Sonoro"), for the benefit of Aldeas Infantiles SOS, the international orphans' organization.

Mariana is also the creator of healing spaces through individual and group singing ("Sonando y Sanando", "Afinando el Instrumento"). She has done workshops for actors, dancers, therapists, musicians and educators, as much in Uruguay as in Spain. She also has created many educational music programs for children.

She has also worked as musical producer for the first CD of ceremonial songs of the Shuar Indians, descendants of the Jibaros of the Ecuatorial Amazonia, interpreted by Medicine men. This recording has been for the benefit of their community.

Her work has also included musicological exploration of Afro-Uruguayan music, Afro-Brazilian music, Afro-Cuban music, the sacred music of the Native Americans of South, Central, and North America, and the sacred music of India.

She also has coordinated healing workshops through laughter called "The Laughter of Being" and "The Sacred Laughter".

For the last two years she has been traveling around the world interviewing artists, teachers, therapists and common people for a non-profit documentary called "Tuning the Instrument". Up until now this documentary has been filmed in India, France, Portugal, Spain, Uruguay and Brazil.

Nowadays, she is recording with Kit Walker, two albums at the same time.

== Awards ==
- First prize "Singing in Family", 1978 for Uruguayan TV.
- Fabini Prize for best composer of music for children
- Best Arranger of music for Carnival, for her work with Contrafarsa 93
- Best song of Carnival Contrafarsa
- Florencio Award for best music for children's theater for the production "¿Será Imposible?"
- Florencio Award for best music for children's theater for the production "Sonando en Montevideo"
- Florencio Award for best play for children, based on her songs, called "Adivina"
- Best Latin song representing Latin America in the festival "Lo Zecchino d'Oro" in Italy.
- Her video clip "Llamando" was chosen to represent Uruguay at Seville Expo '92.
- In 2003 her song "Al Tiempo" represented Latin America again at the festival "Lo Zecchino d'Oro", in Italy.
- Platinum Record for her recording "El Planeta Sonoro" for Aldeas Infantiles SOS, the international orphans' organization.

== Recordings ==
Mariana's compositions have been recorded by:

Mariana Cincunegui, Magdalena Fleitas, Susana Ratcliff (Argentina), Jorginho do Trumpete (Brazil), L'Antoniano di Bologna (Italy), Sara Hjáltested (Iceland), Latin Lover (Sweden), Rubén Rada, La Botija's Band, Lágrima Ríos, Cristina Fernández and Washington Carrasco, Delanuka, Las Tres, Coco Fernández, Patakín, Gustavo Ripa, Liese Lange, La Otra, different carnival groups like Murga Falta y Resto, Curtidores de Hongos, Contrafarsa and La Gran Muñeca, among others (Uruguay), the Choir of the University of Rio de Janeiro, GM Choir of Los Angeles, Choir of the University of Uruguay, among others. The Upsala Choir of Uruguay has recorded all the songs of Mariana's CD "El Gran Misterio".

== Educational videos ==
- La Caja de Pandora, Imágenes, 1991 (the difference of gender in education)
- Cuántas veces más, Imágenes, 1993 (Domestic violence) (translated to English and Portuguese)
- Los 8 Objetivos del Milenio, Famsi, Spain, 2007

== Tours ==
She has brought her music to various continents, sharing the stage with: João Gilberto, Chico Buarque, Fito Páez, Clark Terry, James Moody, Leny Andrade, Alcione, Kit Walker, Paquito D'Rivera and Dave Samuels, among others.

Bands she has been a member of:

Eduardo Mateo, Leo Maslíah, Rúben Rada, Hugo Fattoruso, Eduardo Darnauchans and Fernando Cabrera, among others, as well as Travesía and Las Tres, her own groups. She has been a special guest of carnival groups like Comparsa Sarabanda and Murga Contrafarsa.

Artists she has recorded with (on more than 100 CD's):

Eduardo Mateo, Leo Maslíah, Fernando Cabrera, Jaime Roos, Daniel Viglietti, Rúben Rada, Osvaldo and Hugo Fattoruso, Eduardo Darnauchans, Larbanois-Carrero, Mauricio Ubal, Jorge Schellemberg, Jorge Galemire, Jorge Lazaroff, Rubén Olivera, Lágrima Ríos, Washington Carrasco and Cristina Fernández among others (Uruguay), as well as Tim Rescala (Brasil), Fino Bingert and Latin Lover (Sweden), Litto Nebbia and Quintino Cinelli (Argentina) and Carmen París (Spain).

== Discography ==
With Travesia

- Ni un minuto más de dolor, Ayuí, Uruguay, 1983
- Comenzar de nuevo (ensalada), Orfeo, Uruguay, 1984
- Adempu canta (ensalada), RCA, Uruguay, 1984

As a Soloist

- Hasta Siempre (ensalada), Ayuí, Uruguay, 1985
- Todo Depende, Ayuí, Uruguay, 1986
- Siete Solistas (ensalada), Ayuí, Uruguay, 1988
- Mariana Ingold canta a Leo Maslíah, Ayuí, Uruguay, 1988
- Cambio de Clima, Orfeo, Uruguay/Melopea, Argentina, 1989
- Fue Ayer (Antología), Ayuí/Posdata, 1999
- El Gran Misterio, Ayuí, Uruguay, 1999
- Esperando Salir (ensalada), composiciones de los internos del Iname
- El Planeta Sonoro, a beneficio de Aldeas Infantiles SOS, 2001

With Osvaldo Fattoruso

- En vivo en la Barraca (ensalada), Orfeo, Uruguay, 1989
- El Disco Kid, Ayuí, Uruguay/Melopea, Argentina, 1990
- Haace Calor, Orfeo, Uruguay, 1991
- La Penúltima Musicación (homenaje a Mateo), Orfeo, Uruguay, 1991
- Candombe en el Tiempo, Ayuí, Uruguay, 1994
- La Carpeta Azul (homenaje a Mateo), Ayuí, Uruguay, 1994
- Será Impossible?, Ayuí, Uruguay, 1995
- Arrancandonga, Ayuí, Uruguay, 1996

With TÁ trio (with Leonardo Amuedo and Osvaldo Fattoruso)

- TÁ, Melopea, Argentina, 1992
- TÁ, Vol II, Melopea, Argentina, 2008

With Kit Walker

- Out of Time, 2011
