= South =

One of the four cardinal directions

A 16-point compass rose with south highlighted at the bottom

South is one of the cardinal directions or compass points. The direction is the opposite of north and is perpendicular to both west and east.

== Etymology ==
The word south comes from Old English sūþ, from earlier Proto-Germanic *sunþaz ("south"), possibly related to the same Proto-Indo-European root that the word sun derived from. Some languages describe south in the same way, from the fact that it is the direction of the sun at noon (in the Northern Hemisphere), like Latin meridies 'noon, south' (from medius 'middle' + dies 'day', English: cf. meridional), while others describe south as the right-hand side of the rising sun, like Biblical Hebrew תֵּימָן teiman 'south' from יָמִין yamin 'right', Aramaic תַּימנַא taymna from יָמִין yamin 'right' and Syriac ܬܰܝܡܢܳܐ taymna from ܝܰܡܝܺܢܳܐ yamina (hence the name of Yemen, the land to the south/right of the Levant).

South is sometimes abbreviated as S.

== Navigation ==
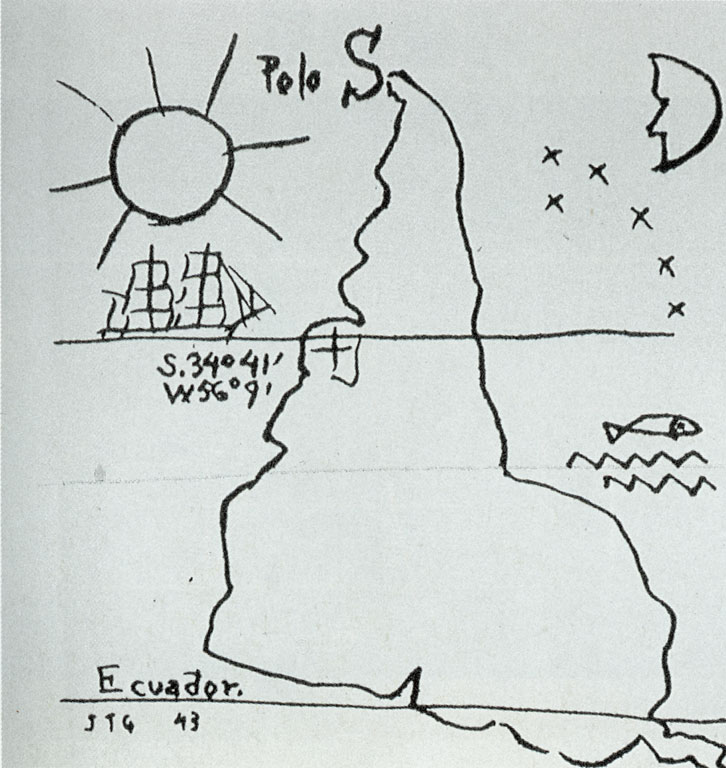
América Invertida, drawn in 1943, by Joaquín Torres García

By convention, the bottom or down-facing side of a map is south, although reversed maps exist that defy this convention. To go south using a compass for navigation, set a bearing or azimuth of 180°. Alternatively, in the Northern Hemisphere outside the tropics, the Sun will be roughly in the south at midday.

== South Pole ==
True south is one end of the axis about which the Earth rotates, called the South Pole. The South Pole is located in Antarctica. Magnetic south is the direction towards the south magnetic pole, some distance away from the south geographic pole.

Roald Amundsen, from Norway, was the first person to reach the South Pole, on 14 December 1911, after Ernest Shackleton from the UK was forced to turn back some distance short.

== Geography ==
The Global South refers to the socially and economically less-developed southern half of the globe. 95% of the Global North has enough food and shelter, and a functioning education system. In the South, on the other hand, only 5% of the population has enough food and shelter. It "lacks appropriate technology, it has no political stability, the economies are disarticulated, and their foreign exchange earnings depend on primary product exports".

Use of the term "South" may also be country-relative, particularly in cases of noticeable economic or cultural divide. For example, the Southern United States, separated from the Northeastern United States by the Mason–Dixon line, or the South of England, which is politically and economically unmatched with all of the North of England.

Southern Cone is the name that is often referred to as the southernmost area of South America that, in the form of an inverted "cone", almost like a large peninsula, encompasses Argentina, Chile, Paraguay, Uruguay and the entire South of Brazil (Brazilian states of Rio Grande do Sul, Santa Catarina, Paraná and São Paulo). Rarely does the meaning broaden to Bolivia, and in the most restricted sense it only covers Chile, Argentina and Uruguay.

The country of South Africa is so named because of its location at the southern tip of Africa. Upon formation the country was named the Union of South Africa in English, reflecting its origin from the unification of four formerly separate British colonies. Australia derives its name from the Latin Terra Australis ("Southern Land"), a name used for a hypothetical continent in the Southern Hemisphere since ancient times.

== Other uses ==
In the card game bridge, one of the players is known for scoring purposes as South. South partners with North and plays against East and West.

In Greek religion, Notos, was the south wind and bringer of the storms of late summer and autumn.
