= Roy Berocay =

Uruguayan writer and musician (born 1955)

- Born: Roy Marcos Berocay Anchustegui; 21 February 1955; Montevideo
- Occupations: journalist, writer, musician
- Awards: Premio Bartolomé Hidalgo; Premio Libro de Oro; Wings Award

Roy Berocay (born 21 February 1955) is a journalist, musician, and an author of children's literature from Uruguay.

He received the Premio Libro de Oro and Premio Bartolomé Hidalgo, as well as the Premio Alas for his contribution to the national culture.

== Works ==
=== Literary ===
Saga del Sapo Ruperto (Saga of Ruperto the Toad)

- 1994, Las aventuras del sapo ruperto
- 1997, Ruperto detective
- 1999, Ruperto insiste
- 1995, Ruperto de terror III
- 1999,Ruperto al rescate
- Ruperto contraataca
- 1994, El abuelo más loco del mundo
- 1997, Lucas, el fantastico
- 1998, Siete cuentos sin sapo

Juvenile trilogy:

- 1998, Pequeña Ala
- 2001, La niebla
- 2004, Tan azul
- 1993, Pateando Lunas
- 1999, Los telepiratas
- 1999, Babu
- 2000, Un mundo perfecto
- 2001, El país de chorros 1 y 2
- 2005, Las semillas de lo bueno
- 2020, Superniña.

=== Discography ===
- El conde de Saint Germain (El conde de St Germain, 1994)
- Pequeños infiernos (La conjura, 1999)
- Lo que hay (La conjura, Bizarro, 2002)
- Por fuera (La Conjura. Bizarro Records, 2005)
- 1000 km para ver (La Conjura, Bizarro Records, 2007)
- Apocalipso (Roy Berocay y La Conjura, Bizarro Records, 2008)
- Ruperto Rocanrol y otras bobadas (Alfaguara 2010)
- Ruperto Rocanrol, El secreto de la felicidad (Alfaguara, 2012)
- Bastante bardo (Ruperto Rocanrol, Papagayo Azul, 2014)
- Alegría mismo (Ruperto Rocanrol, Papagayo Azul, 2016)
- Cinco (Ruperto Rocanrol, Papagayo Azul, 2018)
- El replicante (Roy Berocay, Independent, 2020)

== See also ==
- List of Uruguayan writers
- List of Uruguayan musicians
