= Diego Mattarucco =

Argentine poet, actor and musician

Diego Mattarucco (born 1976 in Buenos Aires) is an Argentine-born slam poet, actor and musician, residing in Madrid since 2012.

He has performed in several stages and festivals, such as “Voix Vives”, “Fringe”, “Cosmopoética”, “Kosmópolis”, "La Encina". He is considered a fresh voice in poetry slams. He is also a member of Letras & Poesia.

His performances are characterised by recurrent word plays and rhymes.

== Selected works ==
- Musiloquios (2015), produced by Pablo Sciuto
- Soliloquios de loco (2015)
- La mente que fragmenta
- Padecer, parecer, perecer y puro ser (2019)
