= Alejandro Balbis =

Uruguayan musician

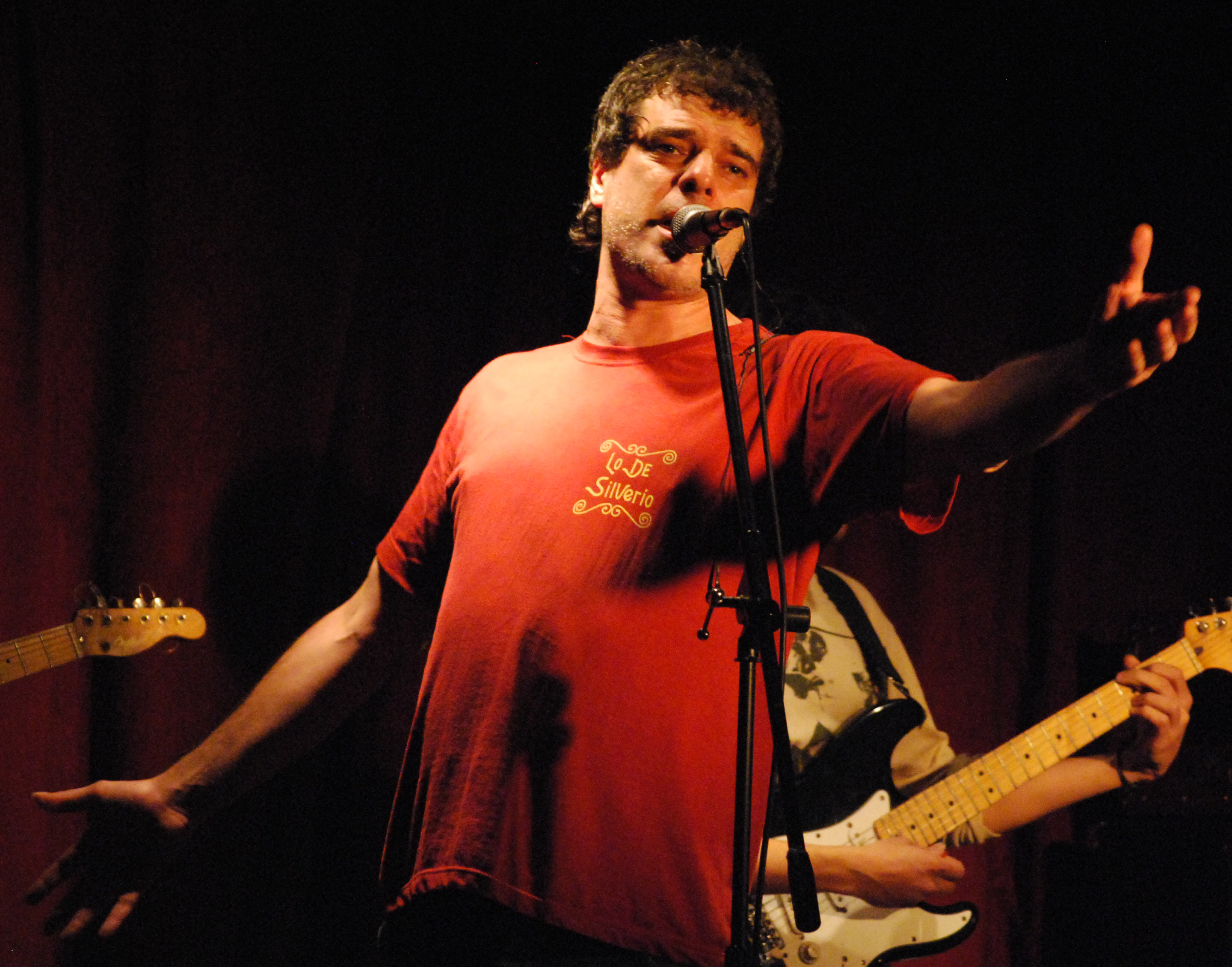
- Alejandro Balbis en 2010.

Background information
- Born: Alejandro Ernesto Balbis; December 4, 1967 (age 58)
- Origin: Montevideo, Uruguay
- Genres: Rock and roll, Murga, Música Rioplatense
- Occupations: Singer, composer, guitarist and producer
- Instruments: Guitar, vocals
- Years active: 1980–present
- Label: Montevideo Music Group
- Past members: Las Pastillas del Abuelo, Ojos Locos, León Gieco, Bersuit Vergarabat, La Vela Puerca, No Te Va Gustar, La Saga

Alejandro Ernesto Balbis (Montevideo, December 4, 1967) is a Uruguayan singer, composer, guitarist and producer.

== Biography ==
=== Early life ===
Alejandro Balbis took his first steps in music at a young age, taking guitar lessons with Jorge Lazaroff, and then singing and directing the children murga Firulete, which later changed its name to Contrafarsa. Eventually, he started competing in the major carnaval. As the time went by, Balbis started to grow as an artist and to gather young musicians he met at singing workshops he gave in Buenos Aires, Argentina. His main influences were Alfredo Zitarrosa, Carlos Gardel and Atahualpa Yupanqui, among many others.

=== Carnaval ===
Since childhood, he showed a great fondness of carnaval, more specifically, the murgas. He went on to become part of murgas such as Contrafarsa, Falta y Resto, Saltimbanquis, A Contramano, Asaltantes con Patente, etc.

=== Solo career ===
After many years of experimenting with different sounds and musicians, "Ale" Balbis got to record his debut album, titled "El Gran Pez", in reference to the movie Big Fish, which had a big impact on the musician's life. The record was viewed in a positive light by critics, especially in Billboard and Rolling Stone magazines, getting a four star score in the latter. The album was presented in Club Niceto and sold out.

== Current band ==
- Tomás Wille (drums, percussion)
- Tiago Vega (bass)
- Manuel Eguía (guitar)
- Sebastián Baró (lead guitar)
- Leandro Stivelman (first chorus, accordion)
- Nicolás Oviedo (chorus)
- Valentin de la Concepción (chorus)

== Discography ==
- El Gran Pez (Montevideo Music Group – 2009)
- Sin remitente (Montevideo Music Group – 2013)

== Bibliography ==
- Montevideo Cachichurris. Issue No. 13 – April 4, 1999, Page 9. Weekly publication – Montevideo, Uruguay.
