= Mateo solo bien se lame =

Mateo Solo Bien Se Lame

Studio album by Eduardo Mateo
- Released: October 1972 (Argentina); December 1972 (Uruguay)
- Recorded: October–December 1971
- Studio: ION Studios, Buenos Aires, Argentina
- Genre: Folk, Candombe, Bossa nova, World music
- Label: De la Planta
- Producer: Carlos Píriz

Mateo Solo Bien Se Lame is the first solo album by Uruguayan musician Eduardo Mateo. It was recorded and mixed by Carlos Píriz between October and December 1971 at ION Studios in Buenos Aires, Argentina. The album was produced by Píriz with the assistance of Eduardo Manuel Rozas, and released by the De la Planta label in October 1972 in Argentina and in December 1972 in Uruguay. All lyrics, music, arrangements, vocals, percussion, and guitars were performed by Mateo.

Its acoustic and minimalist approach, incorporating elements of bossa nova, pop, folk, tropicalia, candombe, milonga, Afro-Latin rhythms, and Indian music, had a lasting influence on both Uruguayan and Argentine popular music.

The title is a wordplay on the Spanish saying “el buey solo bien se lame” (“the ox alone licks itself well”), suggesting self-sufficiency. Mateo performed all instrumentation and vocals on the album, with the exception of the track “Tras de ti,” which features the Argentine vocal group Quinto de Cantares and singer Horacio Molina.

The album is considered a cult classic and is widely regarded as one of the most influential recordings in Uruguayan music history. In 2020, the Uruguayan newspaper El País ranked Mateo Solo Bien Se Lame first in its poll of the 50 greatest Uruguayan albums. A reissue by Lion Productions in the United States in 2006 brought renewed international attention, receiving praise from critics and musicians including David Fricke, Devendra Banhart, and Norah Jones. In 2023, Rolling Stone ranked the album 30th on its list of The 50 Best Latin American Rock Albums.

== Track listing ==
All tracks are written by Eduardo Mateo.

No.	Title	Length
1.	"Yulelé"
2.	"Quien Te Viera"
3.	"Uh, Que Macana"
4.	"De Nosotros Dos"
5.	"Niña"
6.	"Tras de Ti"
7.	"¿Porqué?"
8.	"Jacinta"
9.	"La Mama Vieja"
10.	"Lala"
11.	"La Chola"
12.	"Esa Cosa"
13.	"De Mi Pueblo"

== Personnel ==
- Eduardo Mateo – vocals, guitars, percussion, arrangements
- Carlos Píriz – producer, recording, mixing
- Eduardo Manuel Rozas – assistant producer
- Quinto de Cantares – vocals on "Tras de ti"
- Horacio Molina – vocals on "Tras de ti"
