= Tina Ferreira =

Uruguayan dancer, journalist and vedette

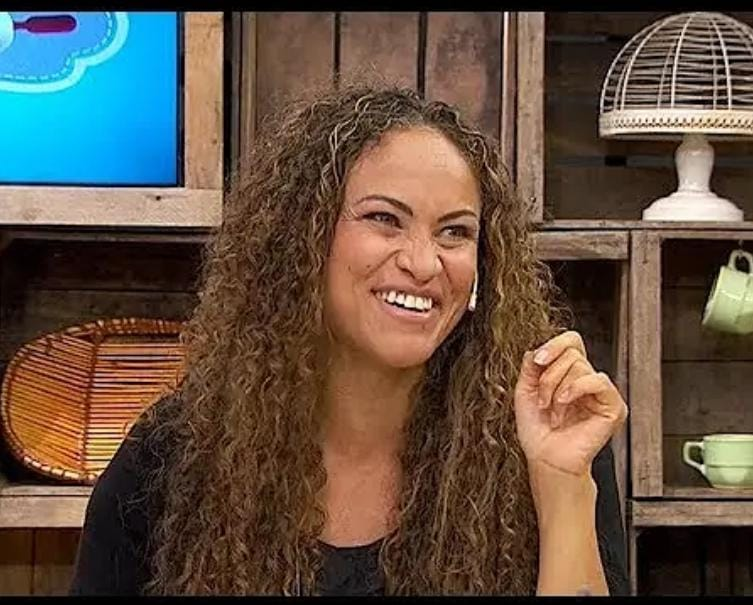
- Born: María Cristina Ferreira Acosta; 14 May 1972 (age 53); Pando, Canelones, Uruguay
- Occupations: Dance, journalist, choreography
- Movement: Candombe, carnival
- Awards: Premio Morosoli in 2001

Tina Ferreira (Pando,14 May 1972) is an Uruguayan, dancer, journalist and vedette of both theater and carnival, known for performing in carnivals all around Uruguay.

She works as the lead vedette in the carnival group Serpentina in which she has worked since 2004 with José de Lima, the group's director. She has won many awards for her performances with the group. She also works as a journalist for Caras y Caretas. In 2010 she was called to work in Nito Artaza's and Miguel Ángel Cherutti's theatre, Teatro Nogaró.
