= Murga =

Form of musical theatre

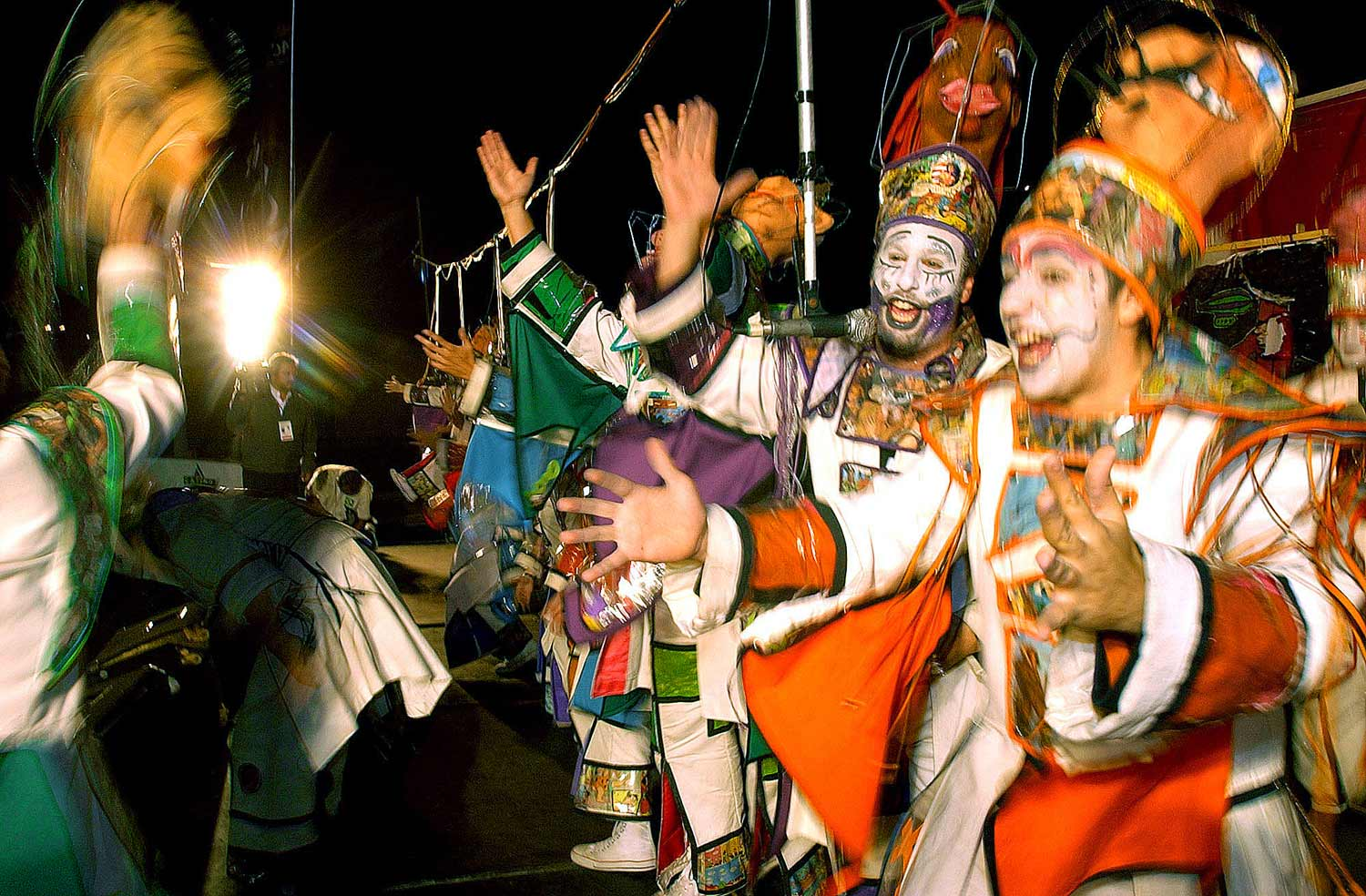
Araca La Cana, an Uruguayan murga group performing on the occasion of the inauguration of Uruguayan president Tabaré Vázquez, Montevideo, March 2005

Murga is a form of popular musical theatre performed in Argentina, Panama, Spain and Uruguay during the Carnival season. Murga groups also operate in the Buenos Aires Carnival, though to a lesser extent than in Montevideo; the Argentinian murga is more centred on dancing and less on vocals than the Uruguayan one. Uruguayan murga has a counterpart in Cádiz, Spain, from which it is derived, the chirigota, but over time the two have diverged into distinct forms.

== Types of murga ==
=== Argentine murga ===
Argentine murga is part of the cultural heritage of Buenos Aires, where it is almost exclusively performed. It has considerable influence from candombe and other African dances and music. Murga porteña places a considerable emphasis on dance and instrumentals, more so than lyrics (in contrast to Uruguayan murga). Performances take place in the form of parades (known as corsos) across the various neighbourhoods of Buenos Aires; some groups feature not only dancers and musicians but also jugglers, stilts, flagbearers, and other types of visually stimulating elements. Corsos take place throughout the year, but are recurrent during carnival season in February.

A very famous song involving a Murga is the song "El Matador" by Los Fabulosos Cadillacs. It also incorporates the use of a whistle, a very common element in the Argentine Murga.

=== Panamanian murga ===
Panamanian murga was pioneered by Manuel Consuegra Gómez in the mid-20th century; Consuegra Gómez mixed traditional carnival rhythms that existed in Las Tablas and Chitré with larger orchestra-style ensembles. The style was referenced in Héctor Lavoe and Willie Colón's song La Murga de Panamá.

=== Uruguayan murga ===
Uruguayan murga is typically performed in Montevideo. Uruguayan murga performances feature up to 17 performers, usually men. In the period preceding Carnival, which takes place from late January to early March in Uruguay, each group will prepare a musical play consisting of a suite of songs and recitative (heightened speech) lasting around 45 minutes. This suite will be performed on community stages known as tablados, set up in Montevideo's various neighbourhoods, throughout the Carnival period. Groups also vie against one another in a prestigious official competition.

Lyrical content is based on a particular theme, chosen by the group, which serves to provide commentary on events in Uruguay or elsewhere over the preceding year. Consequently, murga lends itself well to being used as a form of popular resistance. For example, during the dictatorship in Uruguay in the 1970s, groups like Araca La Cana became known for their left-wing tendencies, subversive commentary and oppositional stance.

A traditional murga group is composed of a chorus and three percussionists and this is the type of murga performed on stages at Carnival. The singers perform in polyphony using up to five vocal parts. Vocal production tends to be nasal and loud with little variation in volume. The percussion instruments, derived from the European military band, are bombo (a shallow bass drum worn at the waist and played horizontally), redoblante (snare drum) and platillos (clash cymbals). The two most important pieces of the performance are the opening song (saludo) and the exit song (retirada or despedida). These get played on the radio during the Carnival period and some of them, such as the Saludo Araca La Cana 1937, are cherished by Uruguayans as cultural icons.

Murguistas dress in elaborate, colourful, jester-like costumes. Staging is sparse with minimal use of props. The singers tend to be foregrounded with the percussionists at the back or off to the side of the stage.

The musical style or rhythmic structures of the murga is sometimes incorporated into Uruguayan popular music. Examples of artists who have included murga in their arrangements are Jaime Roos, Rubén Rada, No Te Va Gustar, Máximo Diego Pujol Washington Luna, and Alejandro Balbis. It has also been incorporated by some Argentine artists, such as Bersuit Vergarabat, Los Auténticos Decadentes, Ariel Prat and Los Fabulosos Cadillacs.

== See also ==
- Rondalla
- Candombe
