= Candombe drums =

Musical instrument

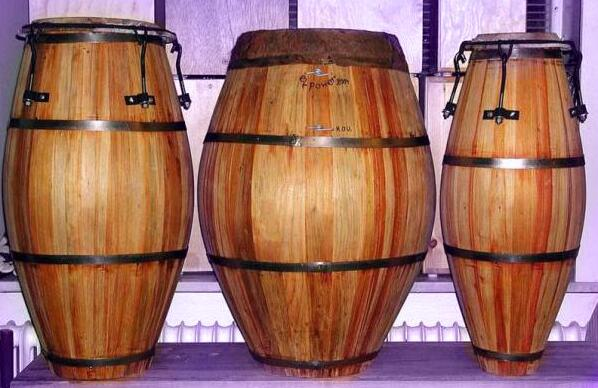
Tambores de Candombe, "repique" drum, "piano" drum and "chico" drum.

The tambores de candombe or tamboriles are drums used in the playing of Candombe music of Uruguay. They are single skin headed and there are three sizes: piano (bass range), repique (tenor range), and the chico (alto range). The drums are made of wood and have a curved barrel shape with its base very narrow.

== Music and description ==
Candombe is performed by a group of drummers called a cuerda. The barrel-shaped drums, or tamboriles, have specific names according to their size and function:
chico (small, high timbre, marks the tempo)
repique (medium, syncopation and improvisation)
piano (large, low timbre, melody).
An even larger drum, called bajo or bombo (very large, very low timbre, accent on the fourth beat), was once common but is now declining in use.
A cuerda at a minimum needs three drummers, one on each part. A full cuerda will have 50-100 drummers, commonly with rows of seven or five drummers, mixing the three types of drums. A typical row of five can be piano-chico-repique-chico-piano, with the row behind having repique-chico-piano-chico-repique and so on to the last row.

Tamboriles are made of wood with animal skins that are rope-tuned or fire-tuned minutes before the performance. They are worn at the waist with the aid of a shoulder strap called a talig or talí and played with one stick and one hand.

A key rhythmic figure in candombe is the clave (in 3-2 form). It is played on the side of the drum, a procedure known as "hacer madera" (literally, "making wood").

=== Master Candombe drummers ===
Among the most important and traditional Montevidean rhythms are: Cuareim, Ansina y Cordon. There are several master drummers who have kept Candombe alive uninterrupted for two hundred years. Some of highlights are: in Ansina school: Wáshington Ocampo, Héctor Suárez, Pedro "Perico" Gularte, Eduardo "Cacho" Giménez, Julio Giménez, Raúl "Pocho" Magariños, Rubén Quirós, Alfredo Ferreira, "Tito" Gradín, Raúl "Maga" Magariños, Luis "Mocambo" Quirós, Fernando "Hurón" Silva, Eduardo "Malumba" Gimenez, Alvaro Salas, Daniel Gradín, Sergio Ortuño y José Luis Giménez.
