= South-up map orientation =

Map orientation

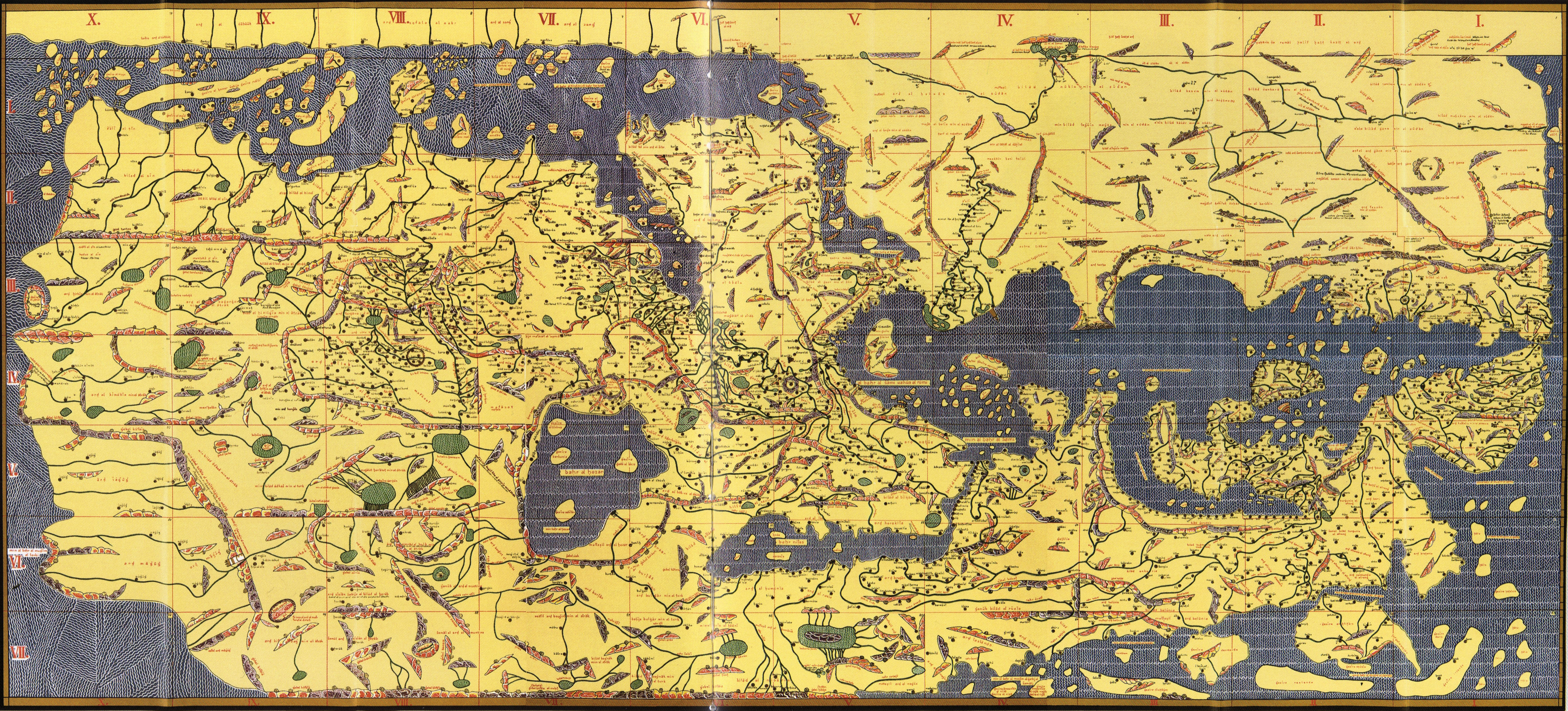
The Tabula Rogeriana, drawn by al-Idrisi in 1154

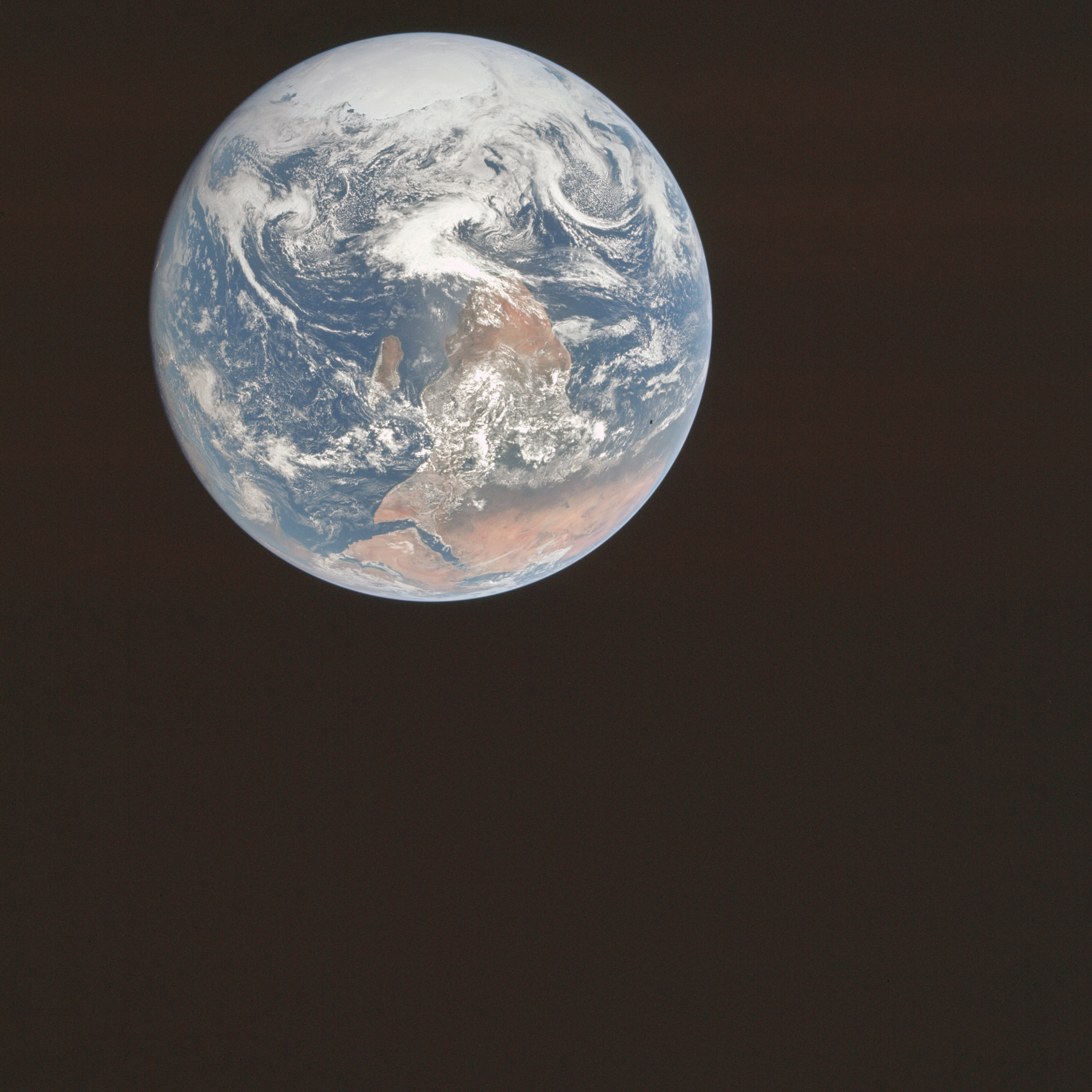
The iconic The Blue Marble photograph in its original orientation

South-up map orientation is the orientation of a map with south up, at the top of the map, west on the right, amounting to a 180-degree rotation of the map from the standard convention of north-up. Maps in this orientation are sometimes called upside-down maps or reversed maps.

== Psychological significance ==
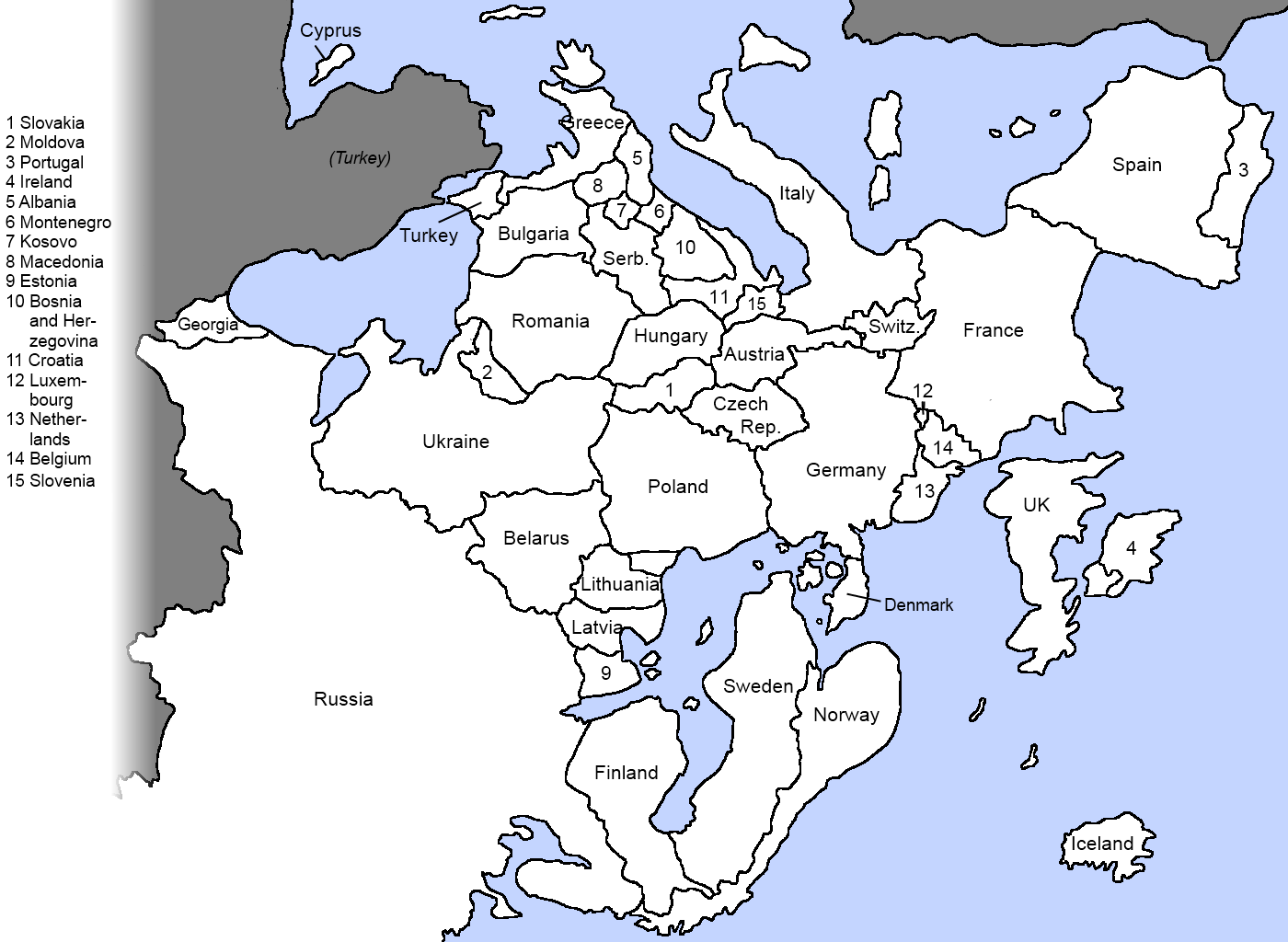
Political map of Europe, showing south at the top

Research suggests that north-south positions on maps have psychological consequences. In general, north is associated with richer people, more expensive real estate, and higher altitude, while south is associated with poorer people, cheaper prices, and lower altitude (the "north–south bias"). When participants were presented with south-up oriented maps, this north-south bias disappeared.

Researchers posit that the observed association between map-position and goodness/badness (north=good; south=bad) is caused by the combination of

- the convention of consistently placing north at the top of maps, and
- a much more general association between vertical position and goodness/badness (up=good, down=bad), which has been documented in numerous contexts (e.g. power/status, profits/prices, affect/emotion, and even the divine).

Common English idioms support the notion that many English speakers conflate or associate north with up and south with down (e.g. "heading up north", "down south", Down Under), a conflation that can only be understood as learned by repeated exposure to a particular map-orientation convention (i.e. north put at the top of maps). Related idioms used in popular song lyrics provide further evidence for the pervasiveness of "north–south bias" among English speakers, in particular with regard to wealth. Examples include using "Uptown" to mean "high class or rich" (as in "Uptown Girl" by Billy Joel), or using "Downtown" to convey lower socioeconomic status (as in "Bad, Bad Leroy Brown" by Jim Croce).

== Political use ==
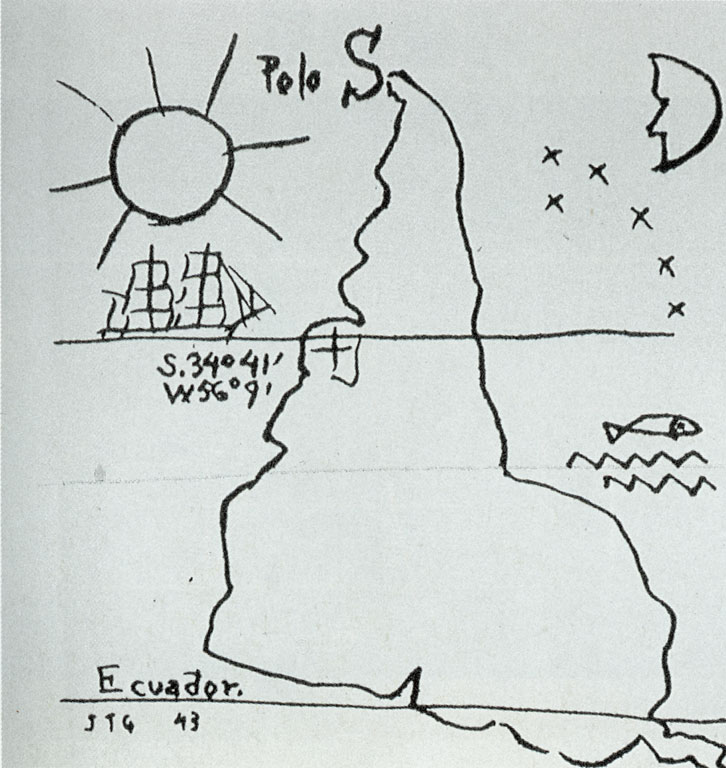
América Invertida, drawn in 1943 by Joaquín Torres García.

Throughout history, maps have been made with varied orientations, and reversing the orientation of maps is technically very easy to do. As such, some cartographers maintain that the issue of south-up map orientation is itself trivial. More noteworthy than the technical matter of orientation, per se, is the history of explicitly using south-up map orientation as a political statement, that is, creating south-up oriented maps with the express rationale of reacting to the north-up oriented world maps that have dominated map publication during the modern age.

The history of south-up map orientation as political statement can be traced back to the early 1900s. In 1943, Joaquín Torres García, a Uruguayan modernist painter, created one of the first maps to make a political statement related to north-south map positions entitled "América Invertida". "Torres-García placed the South Pole at the top of the Earth, thereby suggesting a visual affirmation of the importance of the (South American) continent."

=== McArthur's Universal Corrective Map of the World ===
In 1979, twenty-one year old Australian Stuart McArthur published "McArthur's Universal Corrective Map of the World". An inset on this map explains that he sought to confront "the perpetual onslaught of 'Down Under' jokes: implications from northern nations that the height of a country's prestige is determined by its equivalent spatial location on a conventional map of the world". He had been drawing a map placing Australia at the visual centre of the page since he was 12 years old. At age 15, he was taunted as coming from Down Under as an exchange student. These experiences encouraged him to "correct" the world's map by placing Australia at the top.

== In popular culture ==
South-up maps are commonly available as novelties or as sociopolitical statements, especially in Southern Hemisphere locales. A south-up oriented world map appears in the episode "Somebody's Going to Emergency, Somebody's Going to Jail" of The West Wing, where issues of cultural bias are discussed. The Argentine cartoon strip Mafalda by Quino once posed the question, "Why are we down?" American cartoonist Leo Cullum published a cartoon in The New Yorker titled "Happy Penguin Looking at Upside-Down Globe; Antarctica Is on Top" (April 20, 1992).

The computer strategy game Neocolonialism, developed by Esther Alter, uses a south-up map. The developer stated that this choice was intended to "evoke [sic] discomfort" and to "exemplify the north–south dichotomy of the world, wherein the Southern Hemisphere is generally poorer than the Northern Hemisphere."

== See also ==
- Dymaxion map
- Gall-Peters projection
- Global North and Global South
- Map projection
- Philosophy of geography
- Polar map
- T and O map

== Sources ==
- What's Up? South!.
- De Armendi, Nicole (2009), "The Map as Political Agent: Destabilising the North-South Model and Redefining Identity in Twentieth-Century Latin American Art" (PDF), St Andrews Journal of Art History and Museum Studies: 5–17, archived from the original (PDF) on 2016-04-19.
- Kacinik, Natalie A. (24 September 2014), "Sticking your neck out and burying the hatchet: what idioms reveal about embodied simulation", Frontiers in Human Neuroscience, 8 (689): 689, doi:10.3389/fnhum.2014.00689, PMC 4173310, PMID 25309381.
- Kaiser, Ward (2013), How Maps Change Things, Wood Lake Publications, ISBN 9781770645660.
- Levine, Jesse (1982), A New World of Understanding [map]
- Meier, Brian P.; Moller, Arlen C.; Chen, Julie J.; Riemer-Peltz, Miles (2011), "Spatial Metaphor and Real Estate: North-South Location Biases Housing Preference", Social Psychological and Personality Science, 2 (5): 547–553, doi:10.1177/1948550611401042, S2CID 144903106.
- Meier, Brian P.; Robinson, Michael D. (2004), "Why the sunny side is up associations between affect and vertical position", Psychological Science, 15 (4): 243–247, doi:10.1111/j.0956-7976.2004.00659.x, PMID 15043641, S2CID 31201262.
- Monmonier, Mark (2004), Rhumb Lines and Map Wars: A Social History of the Mercator Projection, University of Chicago Press..
- Montoro, Pedro R.; Contreras, María José; Elosúa, María Rosa; Marmolejo-Ramos, Fernando (2015), "Cross-modal metaphorical mapping of spoken emotion words onto vertical space", Frontiers in Psychology, 6: 1205, doi:10.3389/fpsyg.2015.01205, PMC 4531208, PMID 26322007.
- Nelson, L.D.; Simmonds, J.P. (2009), "On southbound ease and northbound fees: Literal consequences of the metaphoric link between vertical space and cardinal direction.", Journal of Marketing Research, 46 (6): 715–726, doi:10.1509/jmkr.46.6.715, S2CID 16363025.
- Wood, D.; Kaiser, W. L.; Abramms, B. (2006), Seeing Through Maps: Many Ways to See the World, ODT, Inc., ISBN 978-1-931057-20-2.
- Wood, Denis (2010), Rethinking the Power of Maps.
- Haviland, William A.; Prins, Harald. E. L.; McBride, Bunny.; Walrath, Dana. (2010), Cultural Anthropology: The Human Challenge, Wadsworth.
