= Jorge Galemire =

Uruguayan musician

Jorge Galemire (March 11, 1951 – June 6, 2015) was a Uruguayan guitarist, arranger, composer and vocalist and member of Trelew along with vocalist Karen Ann. Galemire is recognized as one of the earliest creators and exponents of candombe beat, on May 22, 2008, he was awarded a Graffiti (Uruguayan equivalent of the Grammys) for his lifetime's work. In 1975 he participated for a short time in the group Canciones para no dormir la siesta. In 1977 he co-founded Los que iban cantando, one of the most important groups in Uruguayan popular music during the military dictatorship.

== Trelew ==
Trelew formed in 2005 when vocalist Karen Ann and guitarist Jorge Galemire met in Uruguay. The band is notable for featuring Galemire, understood to be one of the most important guitarists in Uruguay's Candombe Beat movement. He has featured on albums by Fernando Cabrera, Jaime Roos and Jorge Drexler, as well as multiple seminal Uruguayan albums from the late-1970s. Their mixture of lead singer Karen Ann's stories of her Welsh heritage with a rioplatense (the all-encompassing name for music originating either side of the Río de la Plata) sound have led to recognition both in Uruguay and abroad.

=== Background ===
After performing a number of shows in Uruguay, and then Argentina, Trelew released their debut album, Trelew in 2009. By this point the group had grown to include Nicolas Mora on bandoleon and Ana de Leon on percussion. De Leon was already well known in Uruguay at this point after featuring in the band La Dulce and in the candombe drumming group La Melaza. Release of the record led to being featured in Uruguay newspapers such as Brecha, La Diaria and El Observador, as well as on BBC Radio Wales. In May 2009 they performed in Montevideo's historic Teatro Solís. He died in 2015, aged 64.

=== Recordings ===
- Trelew (Central Records, 2009)

== Other recordings ==
=== With Repique ===
- Repique (Orfeo) SULP 90750. 1984)

=== Soloist ===
- Presentación (Ayuí / Tacuabé a/e29k. 1981)
- Segundos afuera (1983)
- Ferrocarriles (1987)
- Casa en el desierto (1991)
- Perfume (2004)
