= Samantha Navarro =

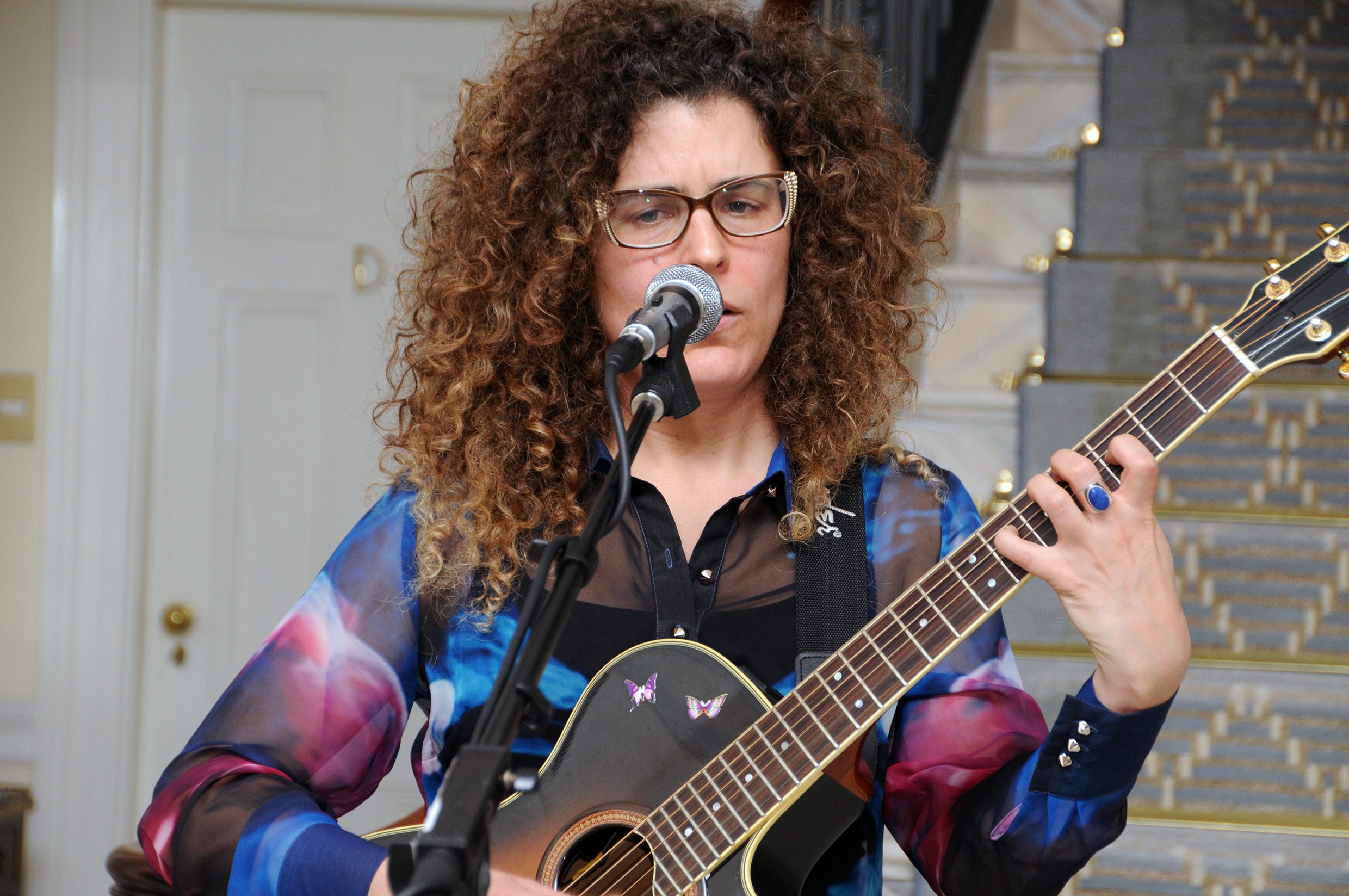
- Samantha Navarro in 2014
- Born: 14 August 1971 (age 53); Montevideo, Uruguay
- Occupation(s): singer, composer, guitarist
- Spouse: Victoria Bugallo
- Website: http://www.samanthanavarro.com

Samantha Navarro (born 14 August 1971 in Montevideo, Uruguay) is a Uruguayan singer, composer, and guitarist.
