= América Invertida =

1943 drawing by Joaquín Torres García

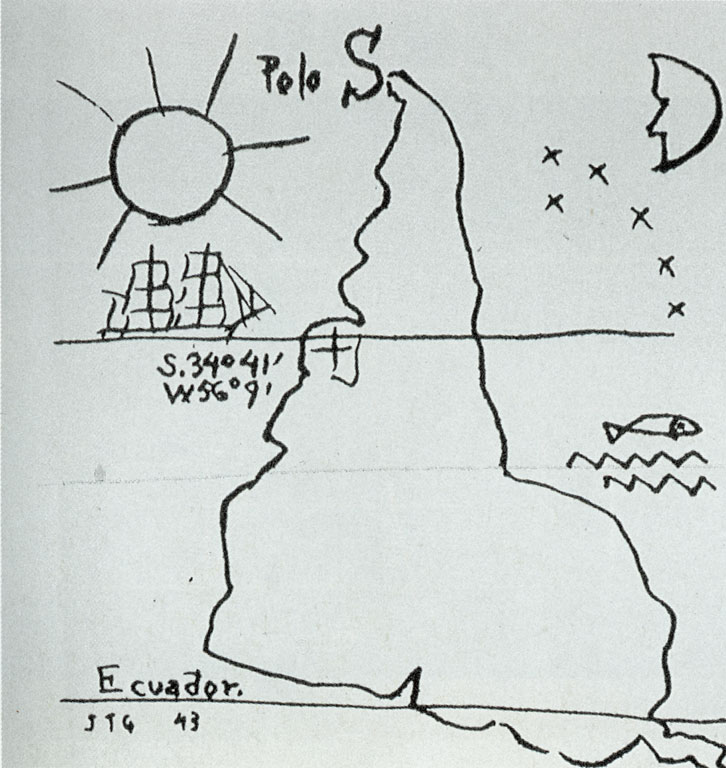

América Invertida is a 1943 pen and ink drawing by the Uruguayan artist Joaquín Torres García.

== Image ==
The image features a depiction of South America that has been turned from its standard depiction and is instead oriented with the south at the top.

== Context and purpose ==
Torres García's creation of the image was connected to his efforts to form a theory of "constructive universalism", meaning contemporary art that was influenced by the traditions of the indigenous Americans.

With his depiction of South America, Torres García is proposing the creation of an autonomous Latin American art movement. That is closely related to his manifesto "The School of the South" in which he stated, "I have called this 'The School of the South' because in reality, our north is the south. There must not be north for us, except in opposition to our south. Therefore we now turn the map upside down, and then we have a true idea of our position, and not as the rest of the world wishes. The point of America, from now on, forever, insistently points to the South, our north."

Critics have interpreted the image as a sociopolitical artistic work that was intended to counter US cultural imperialism and other cartographic and cultural norms rooted in the European colonization of the Americas.

== Legacy ==
The work has become an icon in Uruguayan popular culture.
