= Letras & Poesía =

- Available in: Spanish
- Area served: Hispanosphere
- Founder: Daniel Castaño Rivas
- Industry: Literature in Spanish
- Website: letrasypoesia.com
- Launched: January 31, 2016; 10 years ago
- Current status: Active
- Written in: WordPress

Letras & Poesía (Spanish for “Letters & Poetry”) is a nonprofit literary collaborative project aiming at the Spanish-speaking world. With over 60 authors from 13 countries, it deals with three different areas:

- a digital platform with short stories, poems and opinion articles,
- poetry slams,
- on-site literary gatherings.

The project also features an online shop with anthologies and other books written by its authors.

Some authors of Letras & Poesía are juries in relevant literary contests.
