= Pablo Minoli =

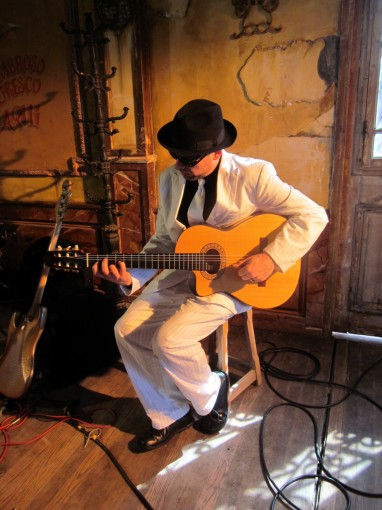

Background information
- Birth name: Pablo Cesar Minoli Domingues
- Also known as: Pablo Minoli
- Born: April 9, 1970
- Origin: Montevideo, Uruguay
- Genres: Hip-hop, Soul, Metal, Funk, Rock, blues rock, pop
- Occupation(s): Composer, Producer, Guitarist
- Instrument: guitar
- Years active: 1986-present
- Website: pablominoli.com

Pablo Cesar Minoli Dominguez (born April 9, 1970) is a composer, guitarist and music producer. He was one of the founders of Venezuelan metal band Laberinto and D-Compose and performed with soul music, hip hop, funk and reggae artists throughout the Netherlands. It is currently one of the metal band's members Seita, of Netherlands.

Pablo Minoli was born in Montevideo, Uruguay. He moved to Venezuela with his parents when he was a teenager, but they moved back to Uruguay a few years later. Pablo only stayed in Uruguay for a little while and then moved to Venezuela by himself where he studied guitar at the Roland Music Academy in Caracas from 1986–1990. In 1992 he moved to Amsterdam where he still lives.

== Biography ==
=== Laberinto ===
He formed the band Laberinto in 1989 in Venezuela together with Marco Toro Bernal (drums), Raymundo Ceballos (vocals), Gregorio Rangel (bass), Miguel Padron (percussion). In 1992 they move to Amsterdam where they struggle to live from their own music. They form a coverband called Santanico to make money that way. But after appearing in a TV show they join an agency and start getting more bookings. Their first CD "Laberinto" appears in 1995, released by themselves and gets good reviews. They start touring Europe in Hungry, Germany, Switzerland, England, Belgium and Italy.

Laberinto signs with record company Mascot Records in 1996 for their second album Priority. They tour in England, Switzerland, Italy, Denmark and Belgium and they play festivals like Dynamo Open Air (1997), Borec Trinec Festival (Czech Republic), WDR Rockpalast, Rocknacht, Bizzare Festival, Wacken Open Air, WaldRock. They did Radio- and TV specials in Germany, Venezuela and the Netherlands (VPRO's Lola da Musica and TMF -The Music Factory).

=== Accident ===
In 1997 Minoli was hospitalized at the intensive care for three weeks after an accident on May 24 at his apartment. A fire made him jump out of the window on the second floor. His recovery went well and soon he could rejoin Laberinto. Throughout Amsterdam benefits were organized by musicians to help him with the hospital bills.

=== Since 2004 ===
In 2004 Minoli left Laberinto to explore new options.

He founded the extreme metal band D-Compose and tours in Italy, Poland, Germany and Czech Republic.

He performs with Brainpower, Big Boy Caprice, Junior Tecla, Ledisi, Shirma Rouse, Maikal X, Strawl and The Cousins and Hind (amongst others). In 1996 he joins an acoustic project of John van der Veer: the Ark and performs at festivals like the International Guitar festival (Bath Spa University- England) and The Sage (New Castle, England). With Big Boy Caprice he performs at the North Sea Jazz Festival in 2006.

He also starts doing studio work with several artists. For Alain Clark he records guitar for Alain's album "Live it Out" and co-writes "Go There" featured on the same album.

=== Ali B op Volle Toeren ===
In 2010 Pablo is asked to join the Ali B op volle toeren project. The concept of the TV-show involves making a new interpretation of old, famous Dutch songs. The songs get re-written by “The Sleepless” (Pablo Minoli, Pablo Penton and Brownie Dutch): every song including Ali B and a guest rapper. They worked with: Ben Cramer, Dennie Christian, Bonnie St.Claire, Henny Vrienten, Lenny Khur, Willeke Alberti and Anneke Grönloh; all big names in the Netherlands. The show wins awards like “Positive Young Media Award” and gets an honor full mention at the Silver Nipkow awards. Also a CD/DVD has been released. A second season of ABOVT is scheduled for November 2011.

=== Alain Clark ===
After earlier studio sessions in 2007, Pablo Minoli, Pablo Penton and Alain Clark join together in the studio for Alain's new album that releases May 18, 2012. Together they compose 13 songs for the 16 track album. Pablo Minoli also takes care of the guitar parts for the album, joined by Rogier Wagenaar and Alain Clark. The album was presented on May 14, 2012, in Panama (club) in Amsterdam.

== Discography ==
=== Albums ===
- Portadas - Laberinto (2005)
- Priority - Laberinto (1996)
- Freakeao - Laberinto (1998)
- Another Style - Laberinto (2000)
- Laberinto Live - Laberinto (2000)
- Década - Laberinto (2003)
- Ancestral Inhuman Thoughtless - D-Compose (2004)
- Separate Chain reaction - Laberinto (2006)

=== Ali B op Volle Toeren - Season 1 ===
Nr.	Broadcast date	Artist	Own Track	Remake	Hit note remake
1	5 January 2011	Lenny Kuhr	De troubadour	Spijt	
1	5 January 2011	Keizer	Mama sorry	De troubadour 2011	Nr. 50 in de Single Top 100
2	12 January 2011	Ben Cramer	De clown	Hé man	
2	12 January 2011	Fresku	Twijfel	De clown 2011	
3	19 January 2011	Willeke Alberti	Telkens weer	Luister meisje	
3	19 January 2011	Kleine Viezerik	Meisje luister	Telkens weer 2011	
4	26 January 2011	Stef Bos	Papa	Dingen gedaan 2011	
4	26 January 2011	Negativ	Dingen gedaan	Vaders	
5	2 februari 2011	Bonnie St. Claire	Bonnie kom je buiten spelen	Eeyeeyo 2011	
5	2 februari 2011	Darryl	Eeyeeyo	Bonnie	
6	9 februari 2011	Dennie Christian	Rosamunde	Ik ben niet meer van jou	Nr. 12 in de Single Top 100
6	9 februari 2011	Yes-R	Uit elkaar	Rosamunde 2011	Nr. 38 in de Nederlandse Top 40; Nr. 7 in de Single Top 100
7	2 maart 2011	Anneke Grönloh	Brandend zand	Obsessie 2011	
7	2 maart 2011	Gio	Obsessie	Brandend hart	
8	9 maart 2011	Henny Vrienten	Sinds een dag of twee (32 jaar)	32 jaar later	
8	9 maart 2011	Winne	Lotgenoot	't Is voorbij	
N.v.t.	16 maart 2011	Compilatie			

=== Ali B op Volle Toeren - Season 2 ===
Nr.	Broadcast date	Artist	Own Track	Remake
1	14 December 2011	Armand	Ben ik te min	Straattaal 2011
1	14 December 2011	Nina	Straattaal	Ben ik te min 2011
2	21 December 2011	Corry Konings	Huilen is voor jou te laat	Zoveel stress 2011
2	21 December 2011	Kempi	Zoveel stress	Maar is huilen nu voor mij te laat?
3	28 December 2011	Rob de Nijs	Het werd zomer	Luie rappers
3	28 December 2011	Hef	Luie mannen	Hoe kan ik
4	4 January 2012	Imca Marina	Viva España	Leef dat feest elke dag
4	4 January 2012	Brace	Vraag jezelf eens af	Viva la vida
5	11 January 2012	George Baker	Una paloma blanca	Tijdmachine 2012
5	11 January 2012	Dio	Tijdmachine	Una paloma blanca 2012
6	18 January 2012	Margriet Eshuijs	House for sale	Daar ben je dan
6	18 January 2012	RB Djan	Hier ben ik dan	Dit keer is het anders
7	25 January 2012	Ronnie Tober	Rozen voor Sandra	Er is niemand zoals jij
7	25 January 2012	Priester	Geen 1	Rozen voor Sandra 2012
8	1 February 2012	Liesbeth List	Pastorale	Ik pluk de dag
8	1 February 2012	Sticky Steez	Spaanse vlieg	Pastorale 2012

=== Alain Clark - Generation Love Revival - May 18, 2012 ===
Track	Title	Lyrics	Music by	Guitar
01	Best Friends	A. Clark	A. Clark, P. Penton, P. Minoli	...
02	Generation Love Revival	A. Clark, P. Monson	A. Clark, P. Penton, P. Minoli	...
04	Nympho	A. Clark	A. Clark, P. Penton, P. Minoli	...
05	Get Your Savy On	A. Clark	A. Clark, P. Penton, P. Minoli	...
06	Signal of Distress	A. Clark	A. Clark, P. Penton, P. Minoli	...
07	Anything	A. Clark	A. Clark, P. Penton, P. Minoli	...
08	I Got You On My Mind	A. Clark	A. Clark, P. Penton, P. Minoli	...
10	Woman Inside You	A. Clark	A. Clark, P. Penton, P. Minoli	...
11	Happy Birthday	A. Clark	A. Clark, P. Penton, P. Minoli	...
12	Two Hands	A. Clark	A. Clark, P. Penton, P. Minoli	...
13	Release It	A. Clark	A. Clark, P. Penton, P. Minoli	...
14	My Shoulder	A. Clark	A. Clark, P. Penton, P. Minoli	...
15	Leaf in the Wind	A. Clark	A. Clark, P. Penton, P. Minoli	...

=== Guest appearances ===
- 1997: "Go There" (from Alain Clark album Live it Out)
- 2006: "Movin On" - Corey
- 2004: "A Tribute to Carlos" - Santanico
- 2005: "The Ark" - John van der Veer
- 2005: "Barrio Latino" - Toro Ensemble
