= Jorge Lazaroff =

Uruguayan composer, singer and guitarist

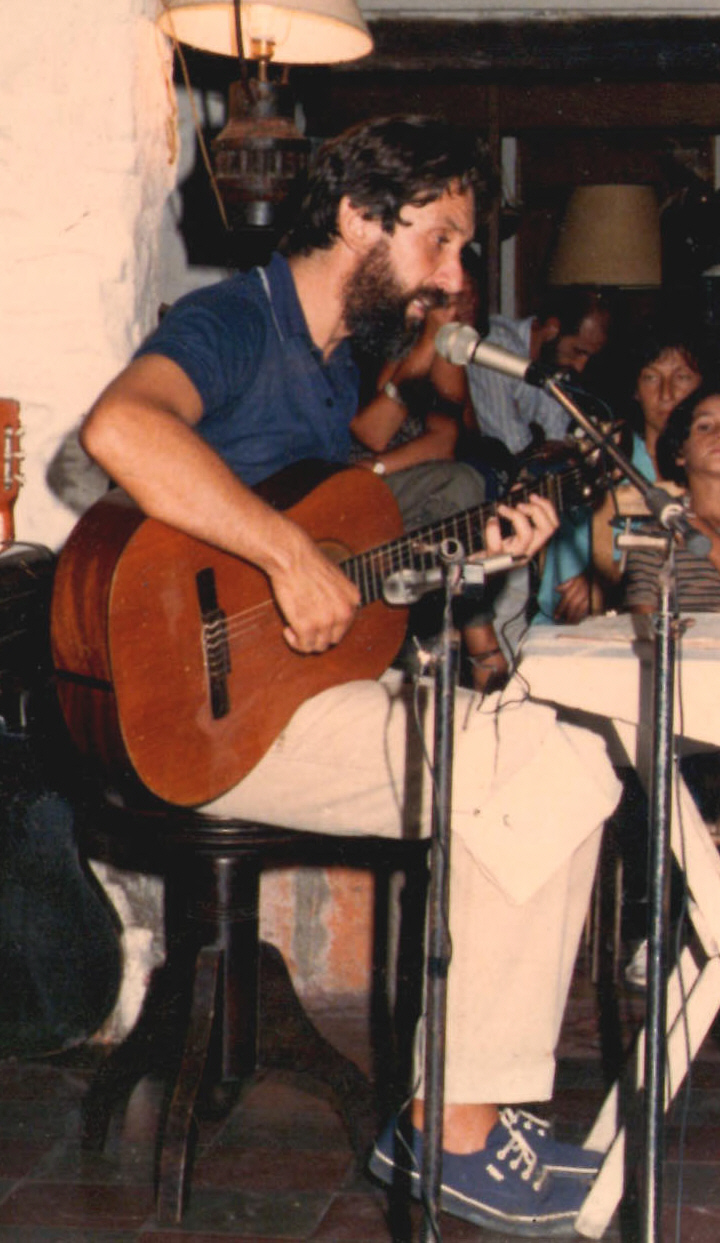
Jorge Lazaroff in concert.

Jorge Ovidio Lazaroff Cesconi (28 February 1950 – 22 March 1989) was an Uruguayan composer, singer and guitarist.

His father was a Bulgarian immigrant and his mother was born in Salto, Uruguay.

== Discography ==
- Albañil (1979, Ayuí)
- Dos (1983, Ayuí)
- Tangatos (1985, Ayuí)
- Pelota al medio (1989, Orfeo)
- Albañil / Dos (1996, Ayuí) (+)
- Éxitos de nunca (Ayuí-Posdata) (+)
- Tangatos / Pelota al medio (Ayuí) (+)

(+) CD Reeditions.
