= Eduardo Mateo =

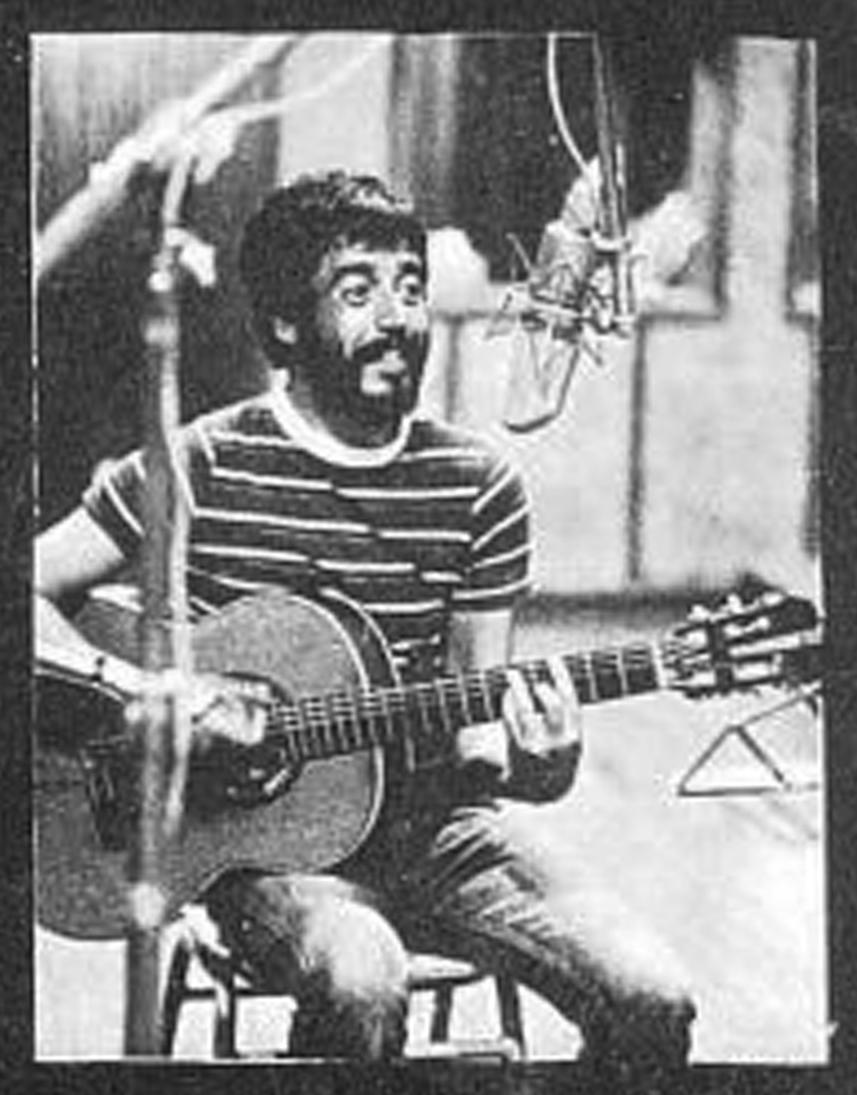
- Eduardo Mateo in the Estudio ION, Buenos Aires, Argentina, 1971

Background information
- Born: Ángel Eduardo Mateo López; September 19, 1940; Montevideo, Uruguay
- Died: May 16, 1990 (aged 49) Montevideo, Uruguay
- Genres: Rock, Candombe, world music
- Occupations: Singer, composer, arranger, musician
- Instruments: Voice, guitar, percussion
- Years active: 1960–1990

Ángel Eduardo Mateo López (September 19, 1940 – May 16, 1990) was an Uruguayan musician, singer, songwriter, guitarist, and arranger. He played a key role in the development of modern Uruguayan music, blending rock, Latin music, bossa nova, psychedelia, and local rhythms such as candombe, in a manner similar to Brazilian Tropicália.

His songs have been recorded by various artists, including Pedro Aznar, Martin Buscaglia, Hugo Fattoruso, Fernando Cabrera, Leon Gieco, Mio Matsuda, Sandra Mihanovich, Milton Nascimento, Jaime Roos, and Yahiro Tomohiro.

== Career ==
In 1967, Eduardo Mateo, along with Ruben Rada, formed the band El Kinto, featuring Luis Sosa (drums), Walter Cambón (guitar), and Alberto Lagarde (bass). Urbano Moraes, Alfredo Vita (bass), and Chichito Cabral (percussion) also joined the band at different times.

Although they went largely unnoticed at the time, the group later became one of the most influential in Uruguayan and South American music, blending rock, pop, and psychedelia with traditional Uruguayan and Latin rhythms—particularly candombe. They sang in Spanish, and their work helped define the genre candombe beat, a fusion of rock and candombe. Mateo disbanded the group in 1970 (Rada had left in 1968) to pursue a solo career.

In 1972, Mateo released his first solo album, Mateo Solo Bien se Lame, produced by Carlos Píriz. The title is a playful twist on the popular saying "el buey solo bien se lame" (the ox alone well licks itself), meaning that one can manage on their own. On the album, Mateo played all the instruments (guitar and percussion) and handled the vocals, except on the song "Tras de Tí", where the Argentine vocal group Quinto de Cantares and singer Horacio Molina (father of Juana Molina, who would later be heavily influenced by this album from a young age) participated.

The album became a cult classic upon its release. Its acoustic and minimalist sound, along with a blend of rhythms and genres—including bossa nova, pop, folk, tropicalia, candombe, milonga, Afro-Latin rhythms, and even Indian music—had a profound influence on both Uruguayan and Argentine music, paving the way for a new musical direction in South America.

When the album was re-released in the United States by Lion Productions in 2006, it made a significant impact, receiving praise from music critics and musicians such as David Fricke, Devendra Banhart and Norah Jones, among others. In 2023, Rolling Stone magazine ranked Mateo Solo Bien se Lame number 30 in its list of The 50 Best Latin-American Rock Albums.

His eccentric personality, problematic drug use, and difficult economic situation (Mateo was homeless for long periods) led to him recording very little in the following years. However, the few albums he did release remained outstanding works, though they were scarcely listened to at the time. In 1976, he released Mateo y Trasante with percussionist Jorge Trasante. In 1984, he released Cuerpo y Alma, which is considered by many to be one of his best works.

From the mid-1980s onward, Mateo focused on an artistic project called La Máquina del Tiempo, in which he combined futuristic reflections on time paradoxes and space travel with elements of electronic music. Mateo recorded two albums under the La Máquina del Tiempo subtitle: Mal Tiempo Sobre Alchemia (1987) and La Mosca (1989), both with the collaboration of Hugo Jasa.

Eduardo Mateo died on May 16, 1990, from abdominal cancer.

== Discography ==
=== Studio albums ===
- Mateo solo bien se lame (De la Planta, 1972)
- Mateo y Trasante (Sondor, 1976)
- Cuerpo y alma (Sondor, 1984)
- La Maquina del Tiempo presenta a: Mateo / Mal tiempo sobre Alchemia (1er. viaje) (Ayui/Tacuabe 1987)
- Botija De Mi País (with Ruben Rada) (Sondor, 1987)
- La Maquina del Tiempo / La mosca (Orfeo, 1989)

=== Live albums ===
- Mateo & Cabrera (with Fernando Cabrera) (Orfeo, 1987)

=== Compilations ===
- Musicasión 4 1/2 (De La Planta, 1971)
- Circa 1968 (with El Kinto) ( Clave, 1977)
- La Máquina del Tiempo / 3er. viaje, 1ª parte: Ida (1971 – 1984) (Ayuí/Tacuabé, 1995)
- La Máquina del Tiempo / 3er. viaje, 2ª parte: Vuelta (1983 – 1988) (Ayuí/Tacuabé, 1995)
- Inéditas (with Diane Denoir) (Vade Retro, 1998)
- El Tartamudo (Perro Andaluz, 2000)
