= Jaime Roos =

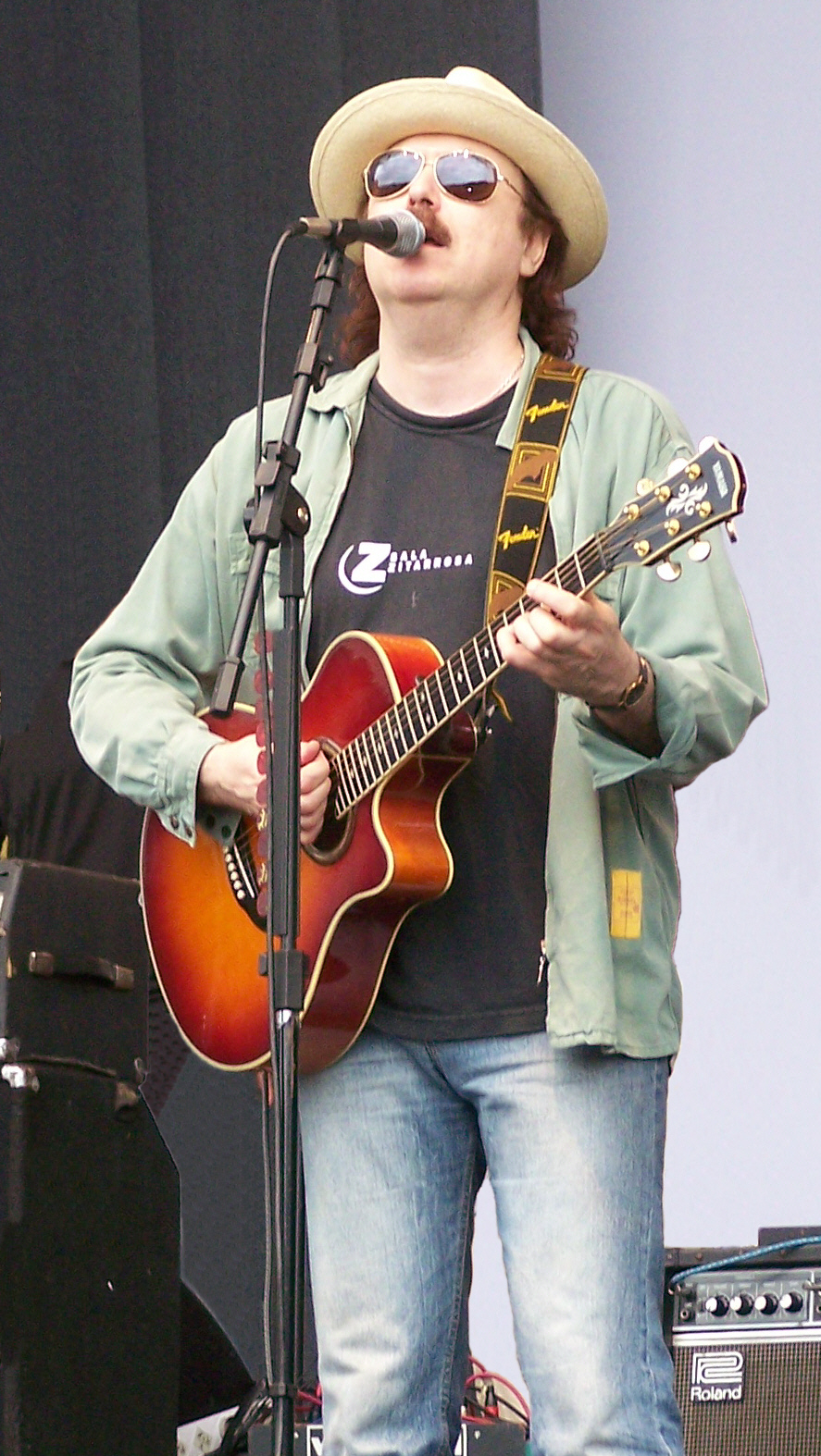
- Jaime Roos in 2007

Background information
- Born: Jaime Andrés Roos Alejandro; November 12, 1953 (age 72); Montevideo, Uruguay
- Genres: Rock; Candombe; Murga; Tango
- Occupations: Singer, songwriter, guitarist
- Instruments: Vocals, guitar, bass
- Years active: 1973–present
- Labels: Ayuí, Orfeo, Sony Music, EMI, MMG

Jaime Roos (born 12 November 1953 in Montevideo, Uruguay) is an Uruguayan singer-songwriter, composer, and producer, widely regarded as one of the most influential figures in Uruguayan music. His work blends traditional local genres—such as candombe, murga, and milonga—with rock and pop elements, creating a distinctive sound often described as a musical expression of Montevideo’s identity.

Roos began his career in the early 1970s and spent several years living and performing in Europe before returning to Uruguay in the 1980s, where he gained widespread recognition. Albums such as Mediocampo (1984) and Brindis por Pierrot (1985) became landmarks in the country’s musical history.

At the beginning of the 1990s, Roos’s fame also reached Argentina, where he came to be regarded as an influential and important musician.

Roos has also composed music for theater and film in both Uruguay and Argentina, produced albums for other artists, and earned numerous awards in both countries.

== Early life ==
From a French father, René Roos, and Uruguayan mother Catalina Alejandro, he was born in the Barrio Sur of Montevideo. Music was always present in the Roos family. His uncle, the musician Georges Roos, introduced him to The Beatles and jazz and his mother introduced him to Uruguayan popular music and Latin American music. The first formal instrument that Roos played was a Brazilian Giannini that he got from his father. He took some lessons in a Montevideo conservatory before he started high school.

== Discography ==
=== Studio albums ===
- Candombe del 31 (1977)
- Para espantar el sueño (1978)
- Aquello (1981)
- Siempre son las 4 (1982)
- Mediocampo (1984)
- Mujer de sal junto a un hombre vuelto carbón (with Estela Magnone) (1985)
- Brindis por Pierrot (1985)
- 7 y 3 (1986)
- Sur (1987)
- Estamos rodeados (1991)
- Cuando Juega Uruguay (1992)
- La margarita (1994)
- El Puente (1995)
- Si me voy antes que vos (1996)
- Contraseña (2000)
- Fuera de Ambiente (2006)

=== Live albums ===
- Esta Noche (1989)
- Concierto Aniversario (1998)
- Hermano te Estoy Hablando (2009)
- En Vivo en el Río de la Plata (2014)
