= Tenement =

Building shared by multiple dwellings

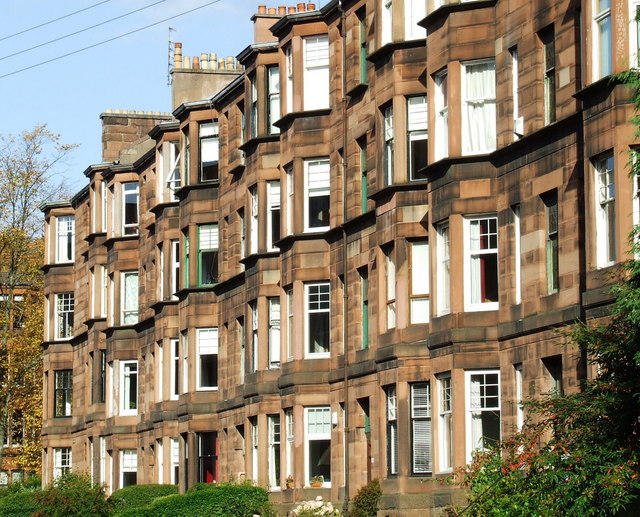
High-quality tenements in the Hyndland residential area of Glasgow, built 1898–1910

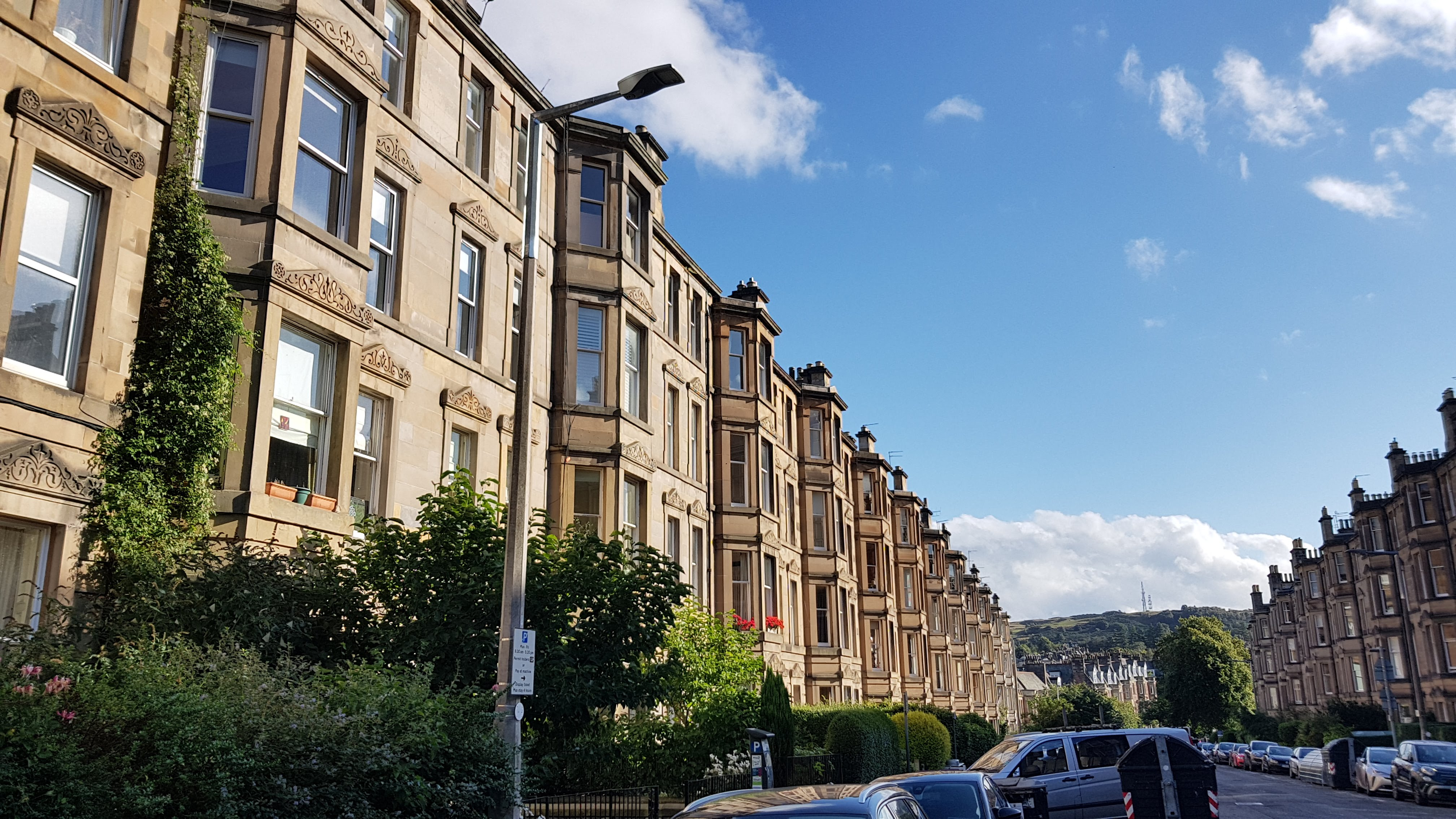
Tenements in the Morningside area of Edinburgh, featuring atypical decorative lintels, built 1880

A tenement, also called an apartment building, is a type of building shared by multiple dwellings, typically with apartments on each floor and with shared entrance stairway access. Tenements are common in cities throughout Europe and North and South America, albeit called different names (e.g. conventillos in Spanish, Mietskaserne in German, vuokrakasarmi in Finnish, hyreskasern in Swedish or kamienica in Polish).

From medieval times, fixed property and land in Scotland was held under feudal tenement law as a fee rather than being owned, and under Scots law dwellings could be held individually in a multi-storey building, known as a tenement. In England, the expression "tenement house" was used to designate a building subdivided to provide cheap rental accommodation, which was initially a subdivision of a large house. Beginning in the 1850s, purpose-built tenements of up to six stories held several households on each floor. Various names were introduced for better dwellings, and eventually modern apartments predominated in North American urban living.

In the medieval Old Town, in Edinburgh, Scotland, tenements were developed with each apartment treated as a separate house, built on top of each other (such as Gladstone's Land). Over hundreds of years, custom grew to become law concerning maintenance and repairs, as first formally discussed in Stair's 1681 writings on Scots property law. In Scotland, these are now governed by the Tenements Act, which replaced the old Law of the Tenement and created a new system of common ownership and procedures concerning repairs and maintenance of tenements. Tenements with one- or two-room flats provided popular rented accommodation for workers, but in some inner-city areas, overcrowding and maintenance problems led to shanty towns, which have been cleared and redeveloped. In more affluent areas, tenement flats form spacious privately owned houses, some with up to six bedrooms, which continue to be desirable properties.

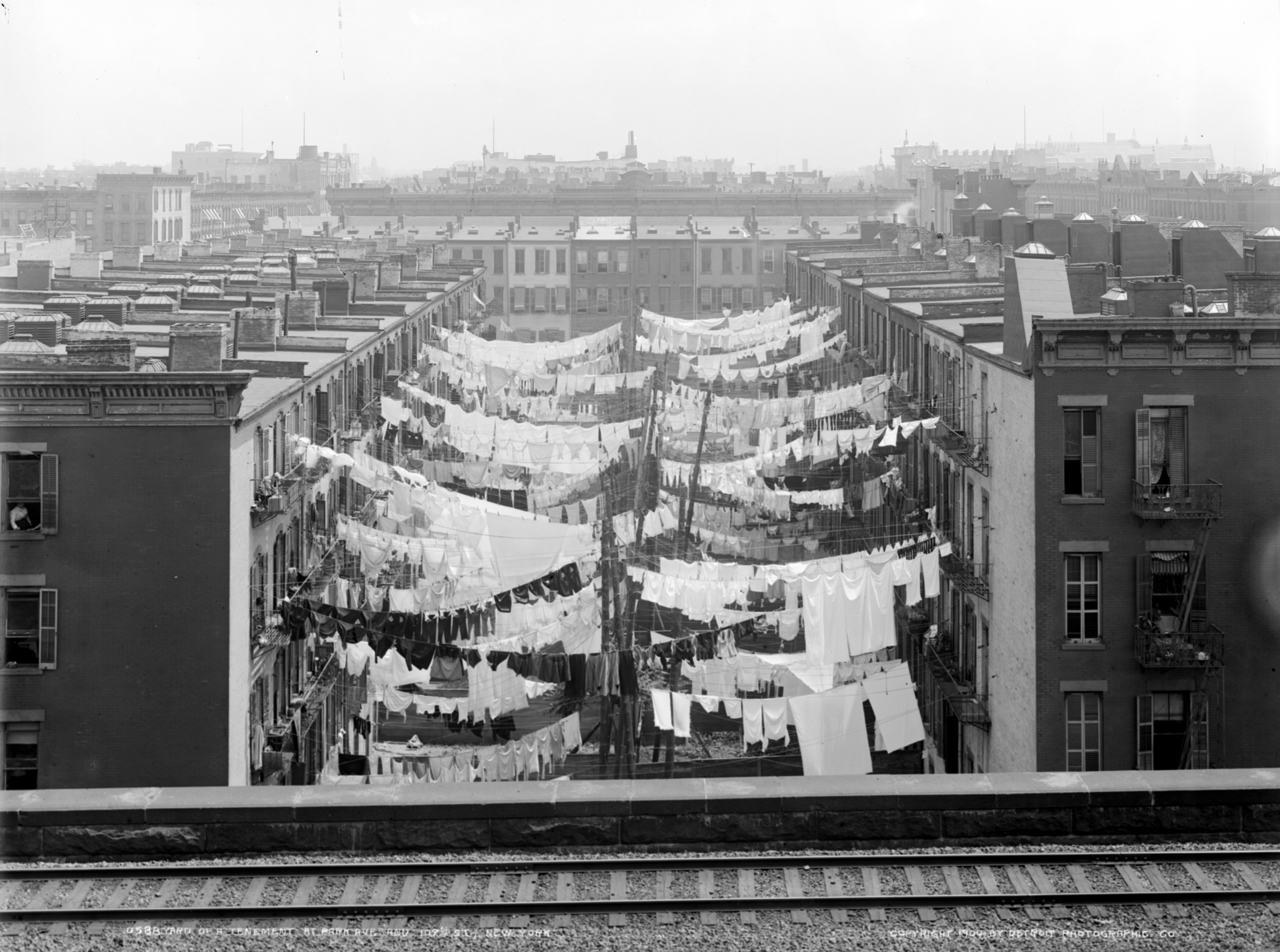
Tenements at Park Avenue and 107th Street, New York City, c. 1898–1910

In the United States, the term tenement initially meant a large building with multiple small spaces to rent. As cities grew in the nineteenth century, there was increasing separation between rich and poor. With rapid urban growth and immigration, overcrowded houses with poor sanitation gave tenements a reputation as shanty towns.

In parts of England, especially Devon and Cornwall, the word tenement refers to an outshot, or additional projecting part at the back of a terraced house, normally with its roof.

== History ==
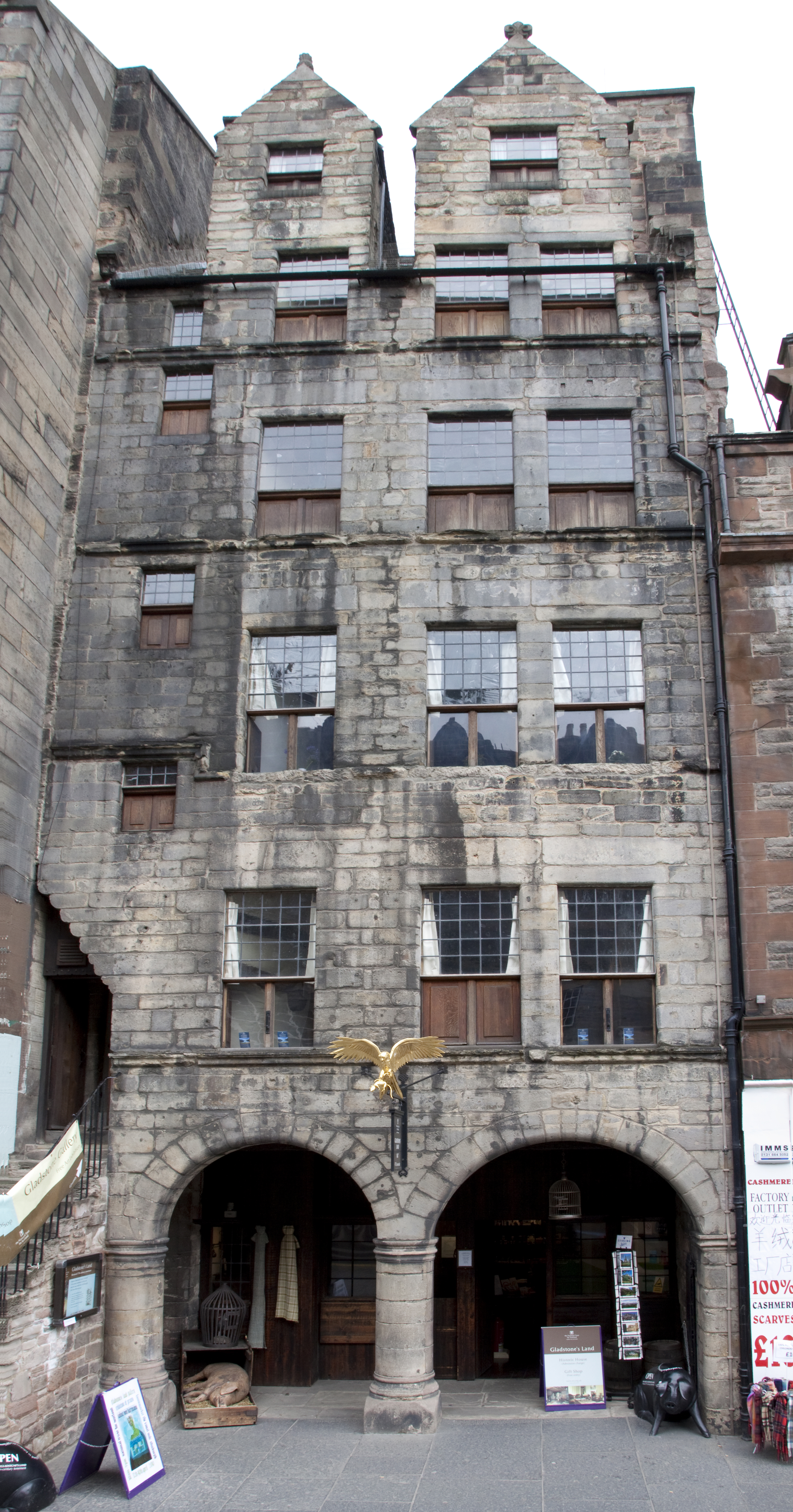
Gladstone's Land is a tenement from 1617 in the Old Town, Edinburgh

In medieval times, the Old Town in Edinburgh, Scotland, developed along its High Street on narrow strips of land ("tenements") feued under tenement law. The restricted site and the constraints of the Edinburgh town walls led to multi-storey buildings with each apartment treated as a separate house, built on top of each other (such as Gladstone's Land of 1617). Over hundreds of years, custom grew to become law concerning maintenance and repairs, as first formally discussed in Stair's 1681 writings on Scots property law.

An early example of a tenement in Wales is Morris Castle in Swansea. The castle was built sometime before 1775 by Sir John Morris to house workers in the rapidly industrializing area. The castle's location was hazardous and impractical and many workers preferred to live in individual cottages. As such, the tenement was abandoned in the 1850s.

In the United States, the term tenement originally referred to tenancy and therefore to any rented accommodation. The New York State legislature defined it in the Tenement House Act of 1867 in terms of rental occupancy by multiple households, as:

Any house, building, or portion thereof, which is rented, leased, let, or hired out to be occupied or is occupied, as the home or residence of more than three families living independently of one another and doing their own cooking upon the premises, or by more than two families upon a floor, so living and cooking and having a common right in the halls, stairways, yards, water-closets, or privies, or some of them.

In Scotland, it continues to be the most common word for a traditional multiple-occupancy building, including high quality dwellings, but elsewhere it is used as a pejorative in contrast to apartment building or block of flats. Tenement houses were either adapted or built for the working class as cities industrialized, and came to be contrasted with middle-class apartment houses, which started to become fashionable later in the 19th century. Late-19th-century social reformers in the United States were hostile to both tenements (for fostering disease, and immorality in the young) and apartment houses (for fostering "sexual immorality, sloth, and divorce").

== Specific places ==
=== New York ===
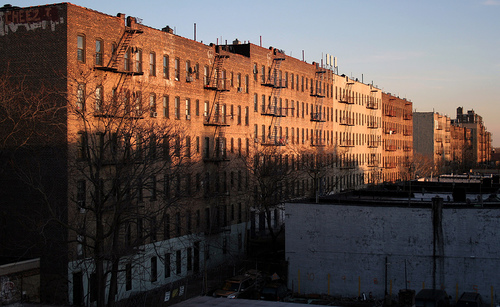
Tenements in Soundview, The Bronx

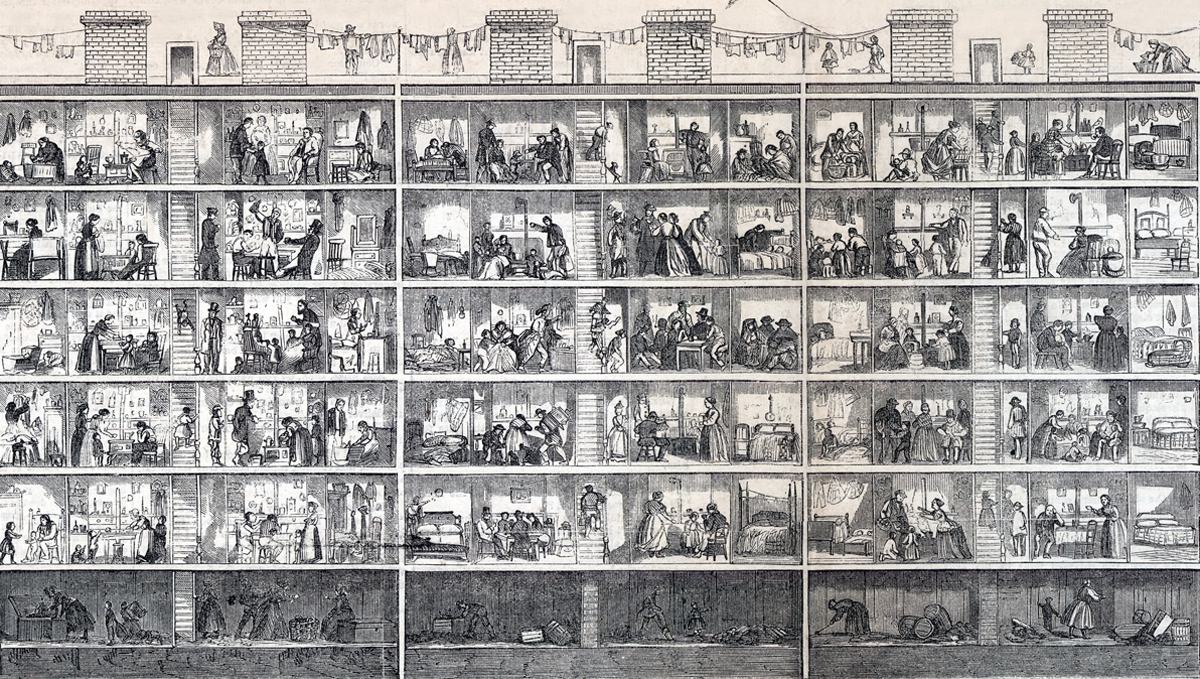
Side Sectional View of Tenement House, 38 Cherry Street, N.Y., 1865

As the United States industrialized during the 19th century, immigrants and workers from the countryside were housed in former middle-class houses and other buildings, such as warehouses, which were bought up and divided into small dwellings. Beginning as early as the 1830s in New York City's Lower East Side or possibly the 1820s on Mott Street, three- and four-story buildings were converted into "railroad flats," so called because the rooms were linked together like the cars of a train, with windowless internal rooms. The adapted buildings were also known as "rookeries," and these were a particular concern, as they were prone to collapse and fire. Mulberry Bend and Five Points were the sites of notorious rookeries that the city worked for decades to clear. In both rookeries and purpose-built tenements, communal water taps and water closets (either privies or "school sinks," which opened into a vault that often became clogged) were squeezed into the small open spaces between buildings. In parts of the Lower East Side, buildings were older and had courtyards, generally occupied by machine shops, stables, and other businesses.

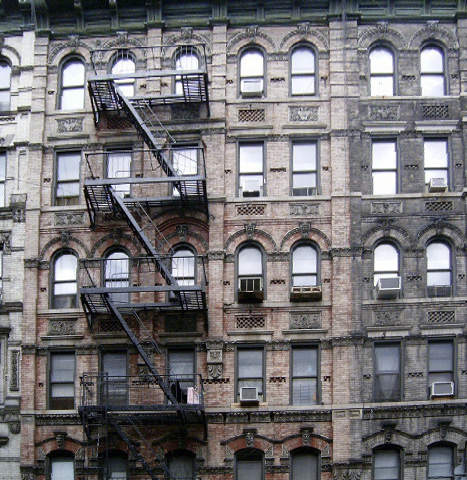
Lower East Side tenement buildings

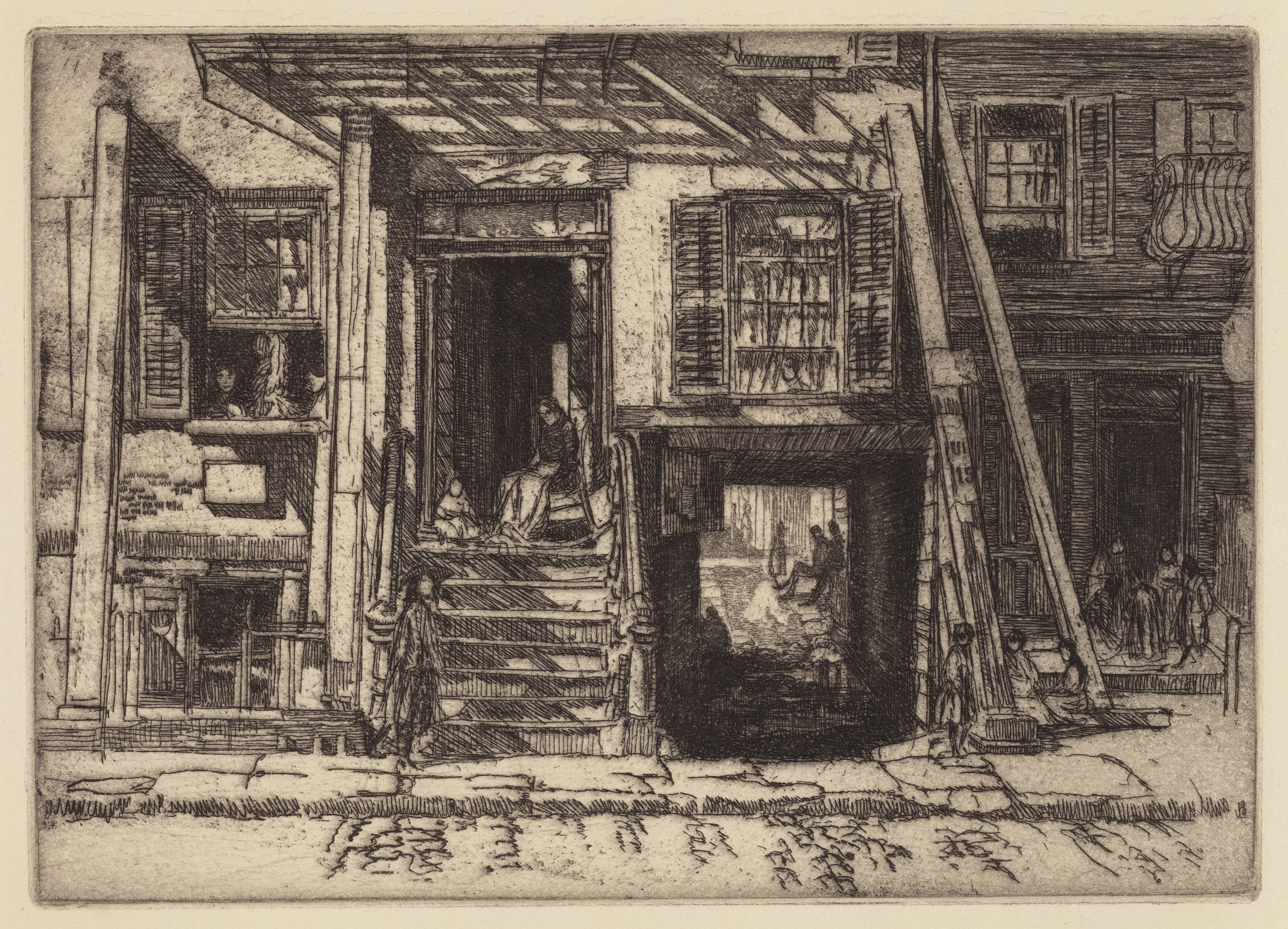
Charles Henry White, The Condemned Tenement, NY, 1906, National Gallery of Art

Such tenements were particularly prevalent in New York, where in 1865 a report stated that 500,000 people lived in unhealthy tenements, whereas in Boston in 1845, less than a quarter of workers were housed in tenements. One reason New York had so many tenements was the large number of immigrants; another was that the grid plan on which streets were laid out, and the economic practice of building on individual 25-by-100-foot (7.6 by 30.5 m) lots, combined to produce high land coverage. Prior to 1867, tenements often covered more than 90 percent of the lot, were five or six stories high, and had 18 rooms per floor, of which only two received direct sunlight. Yards were a few feet wide and often filled with privies. Interior rooms were not ventilated.

Early in the 19th century, many of the poor were housed in cellars, which became even less sanitary after the Croton Aqueduct brought running water to wealthier New Yorkers: the reduction in well use caused the water table to rise, and the cellar dwellings flooded. Early housing reformers urged the construction of tenements to replace cellars, and beginning in 1859 the number of people living in cellars began to decline.

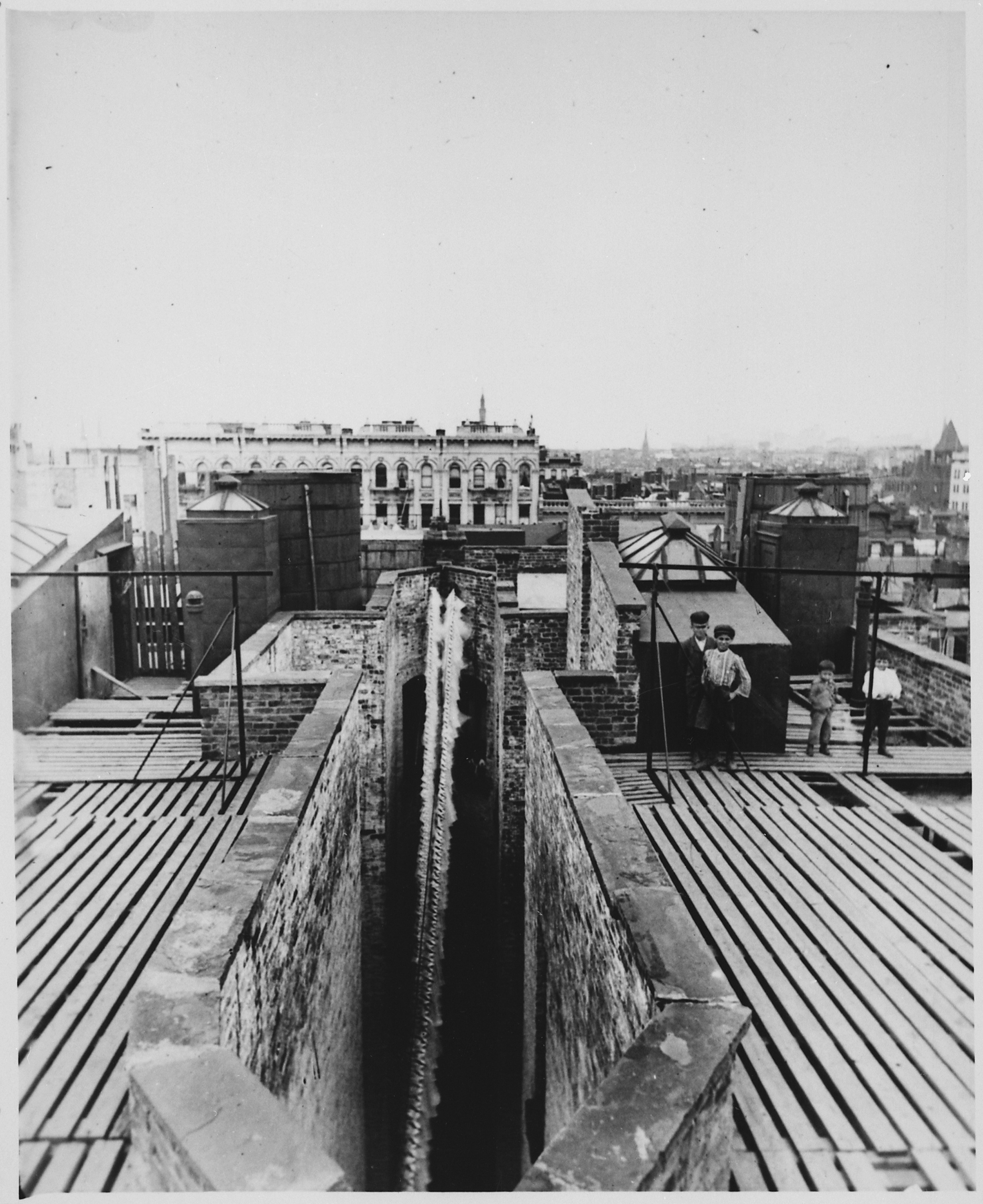
The airshaft of a dumbbell tenement, c. 1900

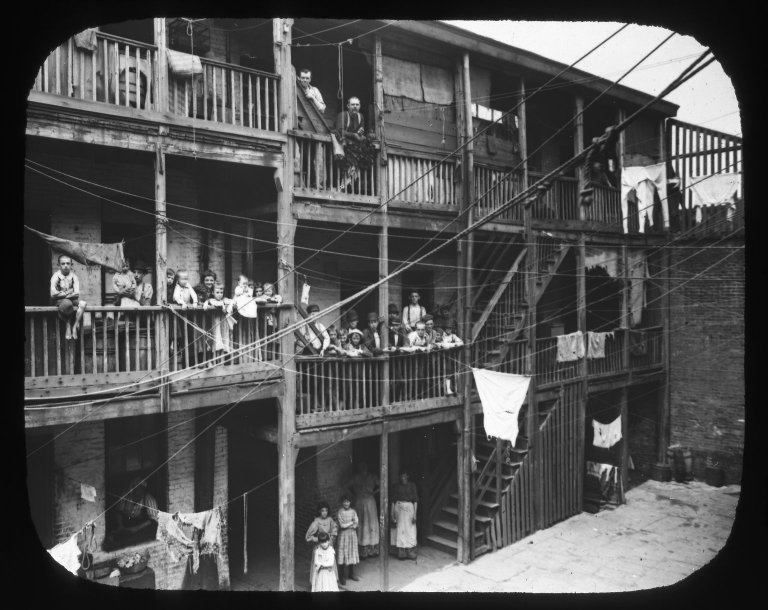
Tenements. Brooklyn, Gold Street, 1890. Brooklyn Museum.

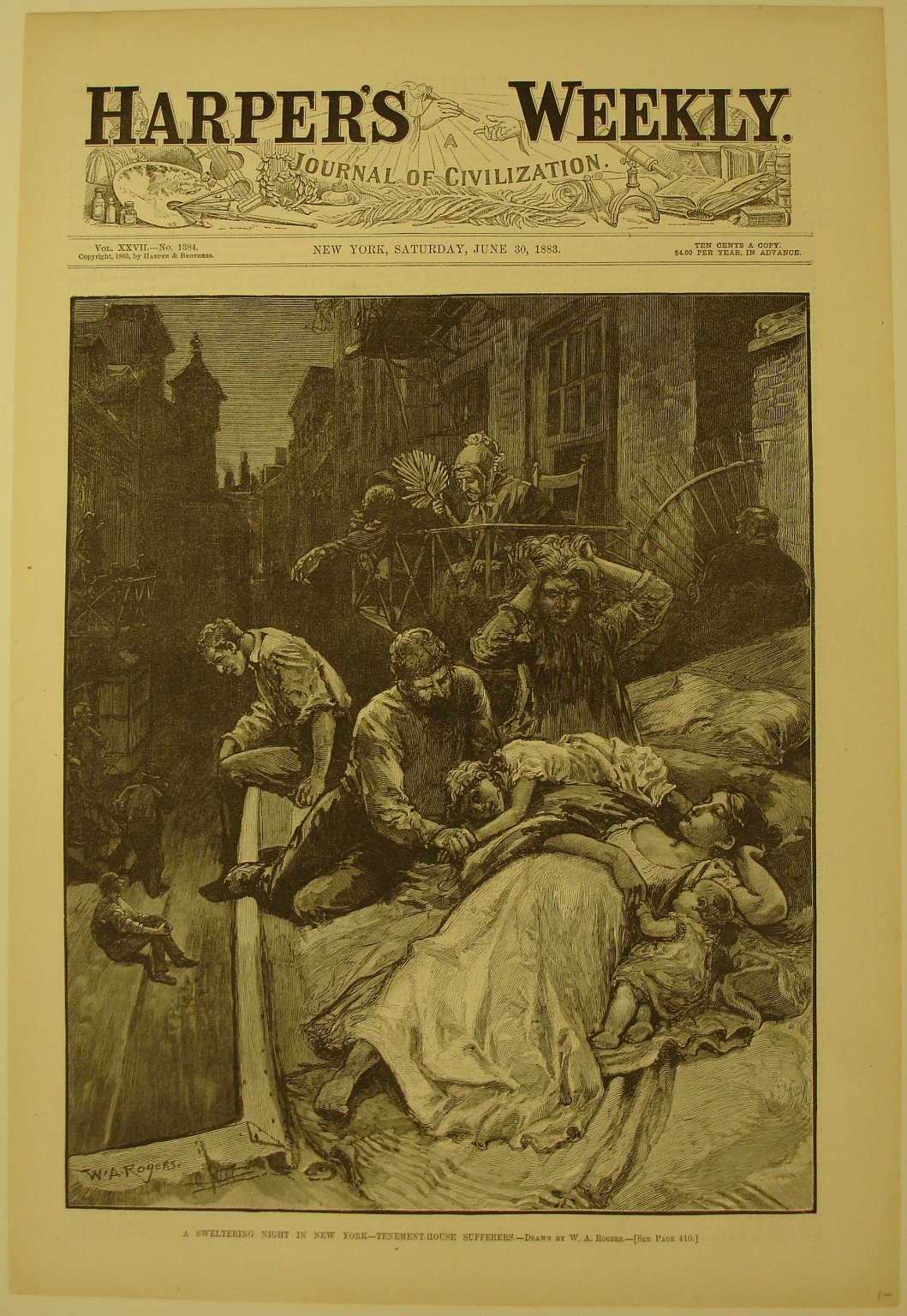
A Sweltering Night in New York, 1883. Brooklyn Museum.

The Tenement House Act of 1866, the state legislature's first comprehensive legislation on housing conditions, prohibited cellar apartments unless the ceiling was 1 foot (30 cm) above street level; required at least one water closet per each 20 residents and the provision of fire escapes; and paid some attention to space between buildings. This was amended by the Tenement House Act of 1879, known as the Old Law, which required lot coverage of no more than 65 percent. As of 1869, New York State law defined a "tenement house" as "any house or building, or portion thereof, which is rented, leased let or hired out, to be occupied, or is occupied as the home or residence of three families or more living independently of each other, and doing their cooking upon the premises, or by more than two families upon any floor, so living and cooking, but having a right in the halls, stairways, yards, water-closets or privies, or some of them." L 1867, ch 908. The New York City Board of Health was empowered to enforce these regulations, but it declined to do so. As a compromise, the "Old Law tenement" became the standard: this had a "dumbbell" shape, with air and light shafts on either side in the center (usually fitted to the shafts in the adjacent buildings), and it typically covered 80 percent of the lot. James E. Ware is credited with the design; he had won a contest the previous year held by Plumber and Sanitary Engineer Magazine to find the most practical improved tenement design, in which profitability was the most important factor to the jury.

Public concern about New York tenements was stirred by publication in 1890 of Jacob Riis's How the Other Half Lives, and in 1892 by Riis's The Children of the Poor. The New York State Assembly Tenement House Committee report of 1894 surveyed 8,000 buildings with approximately 255,000 residents and found New York to be the most densely populated city in the world, at an average of 143 inhabitants per acre (350/ha), with part of the Lower East Side having 800 inhabitants per acre (2,000/ha), denser than Bombay. It used both charts and photographs, the first such official use of photographs. Together with the publication in 1895 by the US Department of Labor of a special report on housing conditions and solutions elsewhere in the world, The Housing of Working People, it ultimately led to the passage of the Tenement House Act of 1901, known as the New Law, which implemented the Tenement House Committee's recommendation of a maximum of 70 percent lot coverage and mandated strict enforcement, specified a minimum of 12 feet (3.7 m) for a rear yard and 6 feet (1.8 m) for an air and light shaft at the lot line or 12 feet (3.7 m) in the middle of the building (all of these being increased for taller buildings), and required running water and water closets in every apartment and a window in every room. There were also fire-safety requirements. These rules are still the basis of New York City law on low-rise buildings, and they have made single-lot development uneconomical.

Most of the purpose-built tenements in New York were not slums, although they were not pleasant to be inside, especially in hot weather, so people congregated outside, made heavy use of the fire escapes, and slept in summer on fire escapes, roofs, and sidewalks.

The Lower East Side Tenement Museum, a five-story brick former tenement building in Manhattan that is a National Historic Site, is a museum devoted to tenements on the Lower East Side.

Other famous tenements in the US include tenement housing in Chicago, in which various housing areas were built to the same affect as tenements in New York.

=== Glasgow and Edinburgh ===
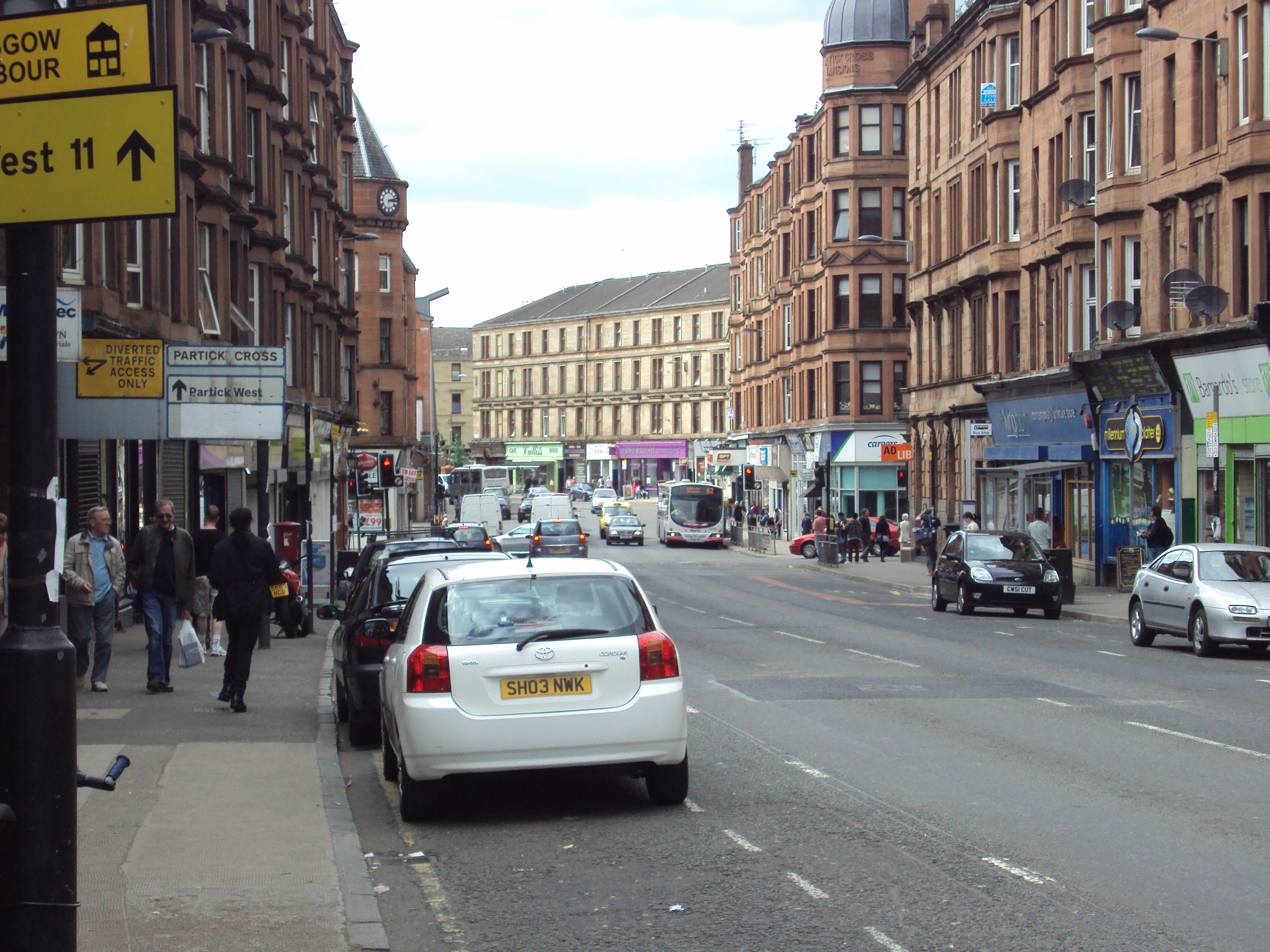
Tenements in Dumbarton Road, Glasgow

Tenements make up a large percentage of the housing stock of Glasgow and Edinburgh in Scotland. Glasgow tenements were built to provide high-density housing for the large number of people immigrating to the city in the 19th and early 20th century as a result of the Industrial Revolution, when the city's population boomed to more than 1 million people. Edinburgh's tenements are much older, dating from the 17th century onwards, and some were up to 15 stories high when first built, which made them among the tallest houses in the world at that time. Glasgow tenements were generally built no taller than the width of the street on which they were located; therefore, most are about 3–5 storeys high. Virtually all Glasgow tenements were constructed using red or blonde sandstone, which has become distinctive.

In Edinburgh, residential dwellings in the UNESCO World Heritage Sites of the medieval Old Town and Georgian New Town (as well as the Victorian city centre districts immediately surrounding them) are almost exclusively tenements. The Tenement House historic house museum in the Garnethill area of Glasgow preserves the interior, fittings and equipment of a well-kept, upper middle-class tenement from the late 19th century.

Many tenements in Glasgow were demolished in the 1960s and 1970s because of slum conditions, overcrowding and poor maintenance of the buildings. Perhaps the most striking case of this is seen in the Gorbals, where virtually all the tenements were demolished to make way for tower blocks, many of which have in turn have been demolished and replaced with newer structures. The Gorbals is an area of approximately 1 km^{2} and at one time had an estimated 90,000 people living in its tenements, leading to very poor living conditions. The population now is roughly 10,000.

Tenement demolition was to a significantly lesser extent in Edinburgh, thus making its later World Heritage designations in 1985 possible. Largely, such clearances were limited to pre-Victorian buildings outside the New Town area and were precipitated by the so-called "Penny Tenement" incident of 1959 in which a tenement collapsed.

Apartments in tenement buildings in both cities are now often highly sought after, due to their locations, often large rooms, high ceilings, ornamentation and period features.

=== Berlin ===
In German, the term corresponding to tenement is Mietskaserne, "rental barracks", and the city especially known for them is Berlin. In 1930, Werner Hegemann's polemic Das steinerne Berlin (lit. transl. The stony Berlin) referred to the city in its subtitle as "the largest tenement city in the world." They were built during a period of great increases in population between 1860 and 1914, particularly after German unification in 1871, in a broad ring enclosing the old city center, sometimes called the Wilhelmian or Wilhelmine Ring. The buildings are almost always five stories high because of the mandated maximum height. The blocks are large because the streets were required to be able to handle heavy traffic, and the lots are therefore also large: required to have courtyards large enough for a fire truck to turn around, the buildings have front, rear, and cross buildings enclosing several courtyards. Buildings within the courtyards were the location of much of Berlin's industry until the 1920s, and noise and other nuisances affected the apartments, only the best of which had windows facing the street.

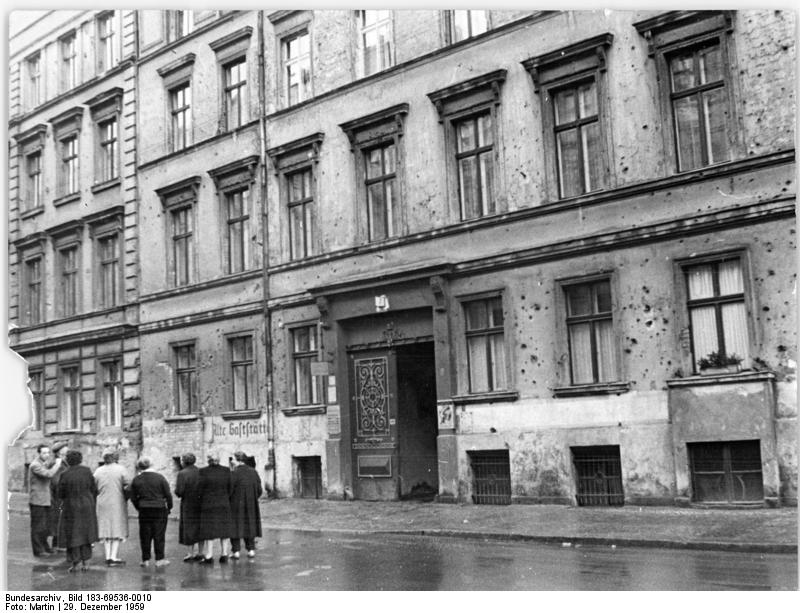
Members of a tenants' collective in front of their tenement building in East Berlin in 1959 (the façade still pockmarked with 1945 battle damage)

One notorious Berlin Mietskaserne was Meyers Hof in Gesundbrunnen, which at times housed 2,000 people and required its police officer to keep order.

Between 1901 and 1920, a Berlin clinic investigated and documented in photographs the living conditions of its patients, revealing that many lived in damp basements and garrets, spaces under stairs, and apartments where the windows were blocked by courtyard businesses.

Many apartments in the Wilhelmian Ring were very small, only one room and a kitchen. Also, apartments were laid out with their rooms reached via a common internal corridor, which even the Berlin Architects' Association recognized was unhealthy and detrimental to family life. Sanitation was inadequate: in a survey of one area in 1962, only 15 percent of apartments had both a toilet and a bath or shower; 19 percent had only a toilet, and 66 percent shared staircase toilets. Heating was provided by stoves burning charcoal briquettes.

=== Dublin ===
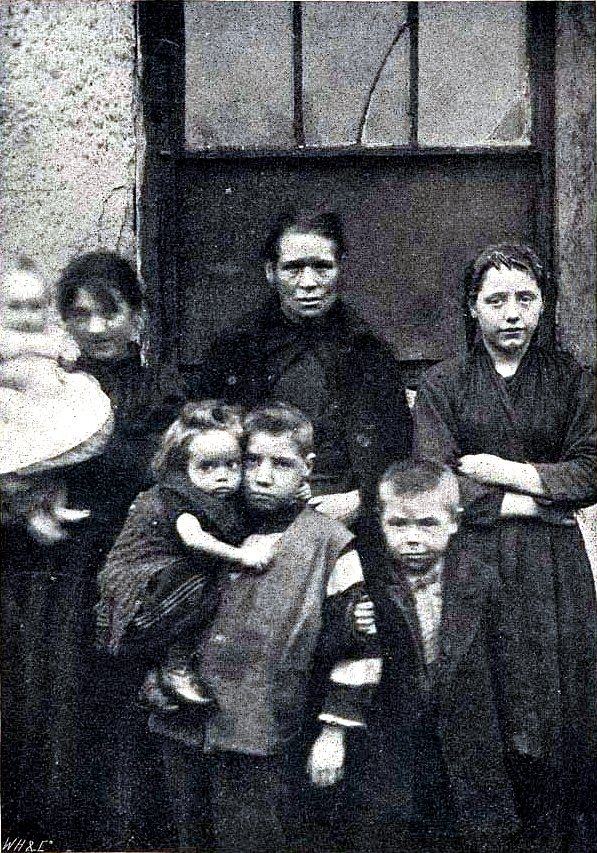
Dublin slum dwellers, 1901

By the 19th and early 20th century, Dublin's tenements (Irish: tionóntán) were infamous, often described as the worst in Europe. Many tenement buildings were originally the Georgian townhouses of upper-class families, neglected and subdivided over the centuries to house dozens of Dublin's poor. Henrietta Street's fifteen buildings housed 835 people. In 1911 nearly 26,000 families lived in inner-city tenements, and 20,000 of these families lived in a single room. Disease was common, with death rates of 22.3 per thousand (compared with 15.6 for London at the same time).

The collapse of 65–66 Church Street in 1913, which killed seven residents, led to inquiries into housing. A housing committee report of 1914 said,

There are many tenement houses with seven or eight rooms that house a family in each room and contain a population of between 40 and 50 souls. We have visited one house that we found to be occupied by 98 persons, another by 74 and a third by 73.

The entrance to all tenement houses is by a common door off either a street, lane or alley, and, in most cases, the door is never shut, day or night. The passages and stairs are common and the rooms all open directly either off the passages or landings.

Most of these houses have yards at the back, some of which are a fair size, while others are very small, and some few houses have no yards at all. Generally, the only water supply of the house is furnished by a single water tap, which is in the yard. The yard is common and the closet accommodation [toilet] is to be found there, except in some few cases in which there is no yard, when it is to be found in the basement where there is little light or ventilation.

The closet accommodation is common not only to the occupants of the house, but to anyone who likes to come in off the street, and is, of course, common to both sexes. The roofs of the tenement houses are, as a rule, bad . . .

Having visited a large number of these houses in all parts of the city, we have no hesitation in saying that it is no uncommon thing to find halls and landings, yards and closets of the houses in a filthy condition, and, in nearly every case, human excreta is to be found scattered about the yards and in the floors of the closets and, in some cases, even in the passages of the house itself.

Tenement life often appeared in fiction, such as the "Dublin trilogy" of plays by Seán O'Casey, Oliver St. John Gogarty's play Blight, and James Plunkett's novel Strumpet City (adapted for television in 1980). 14 Henrietta Street serves as a museum of Dublin tenement life.

The last tenements were closed in the 1970s, families being rehoused in new suburbs such as Ballymun.

=== Buenos Aires ===
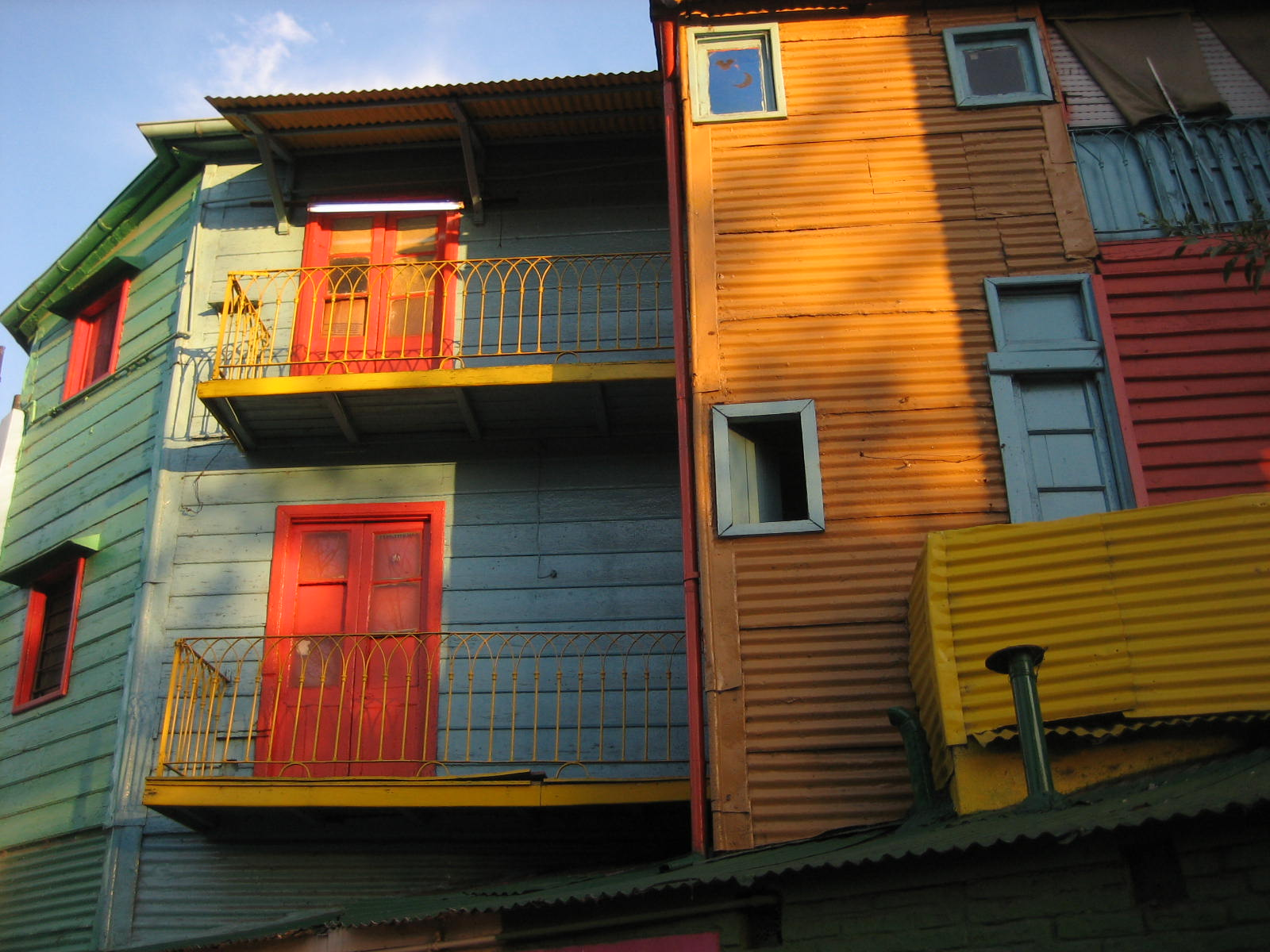
Conventillo in La Boca, Buenos Aires

In Buenos Aires, the tenements, called conventillos, developed from subdividing one- or two-story houses built around courtyards for well-off families. These were long and narrow, three to six times as long as they were wide, and the size of the patios was reduced until as many as 350 people could be living on a lot that had originally housed 25. Purpose-built tenements copied their form. By 1907 there were some 2,500 conventillos, with 150,000 occupants. El conventillo de la Paloma was particularly famous and is the title of a play by Alberto Vaccarezza.

=== Montevideo ===
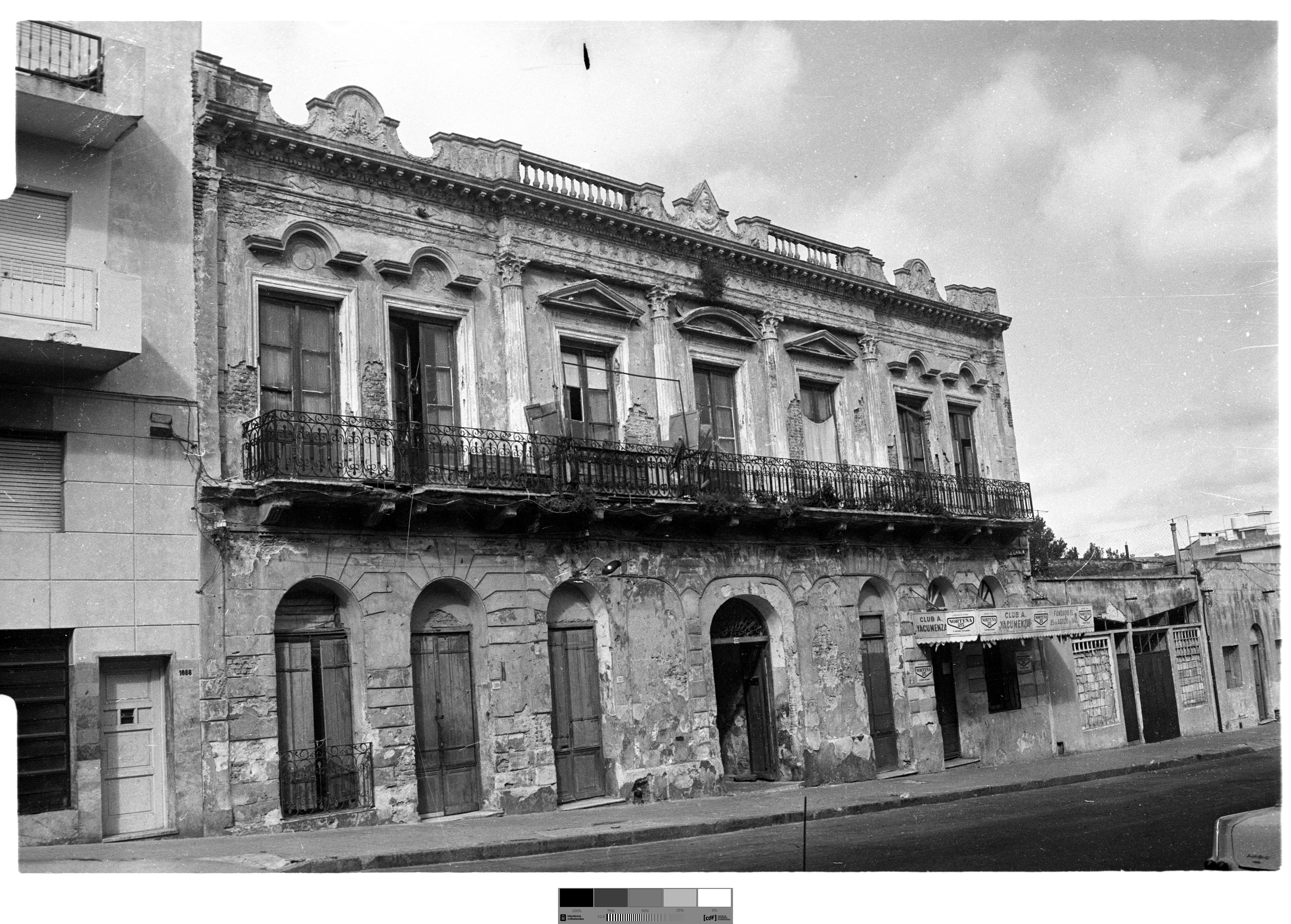
Conventillo Mediomundo in the Barrio Sur neighbourhood

In Montevideo, Uruguay, the tenements, called conventillos, emerged from the end of the 19th century, due to the rapid increase in the city's population caused by the massive arrival of immigrants and the settlement of people from other areas of the country, especially from the countryside. They were located mainly in the southwestern neighborhoods of Ciudad Vieja, Palermo and Barrio Sur.

They were inhabited by low-income and working-class people, including Italian and Spanish immigrants, Sephardic Jews and Afro-Uruguayans. The now demolished Conventillo Mediomundo located in Barrio Sur was one of the most emblematic, as it was a central hub for the Afro-Uruguayan community and for candombe music and dance.

In the conventillos, social gatherings were organized where tango was danced, which arose from the mixture of the different cultures of the working class people who lived in these collective dwellings.

=== Mumbai ===
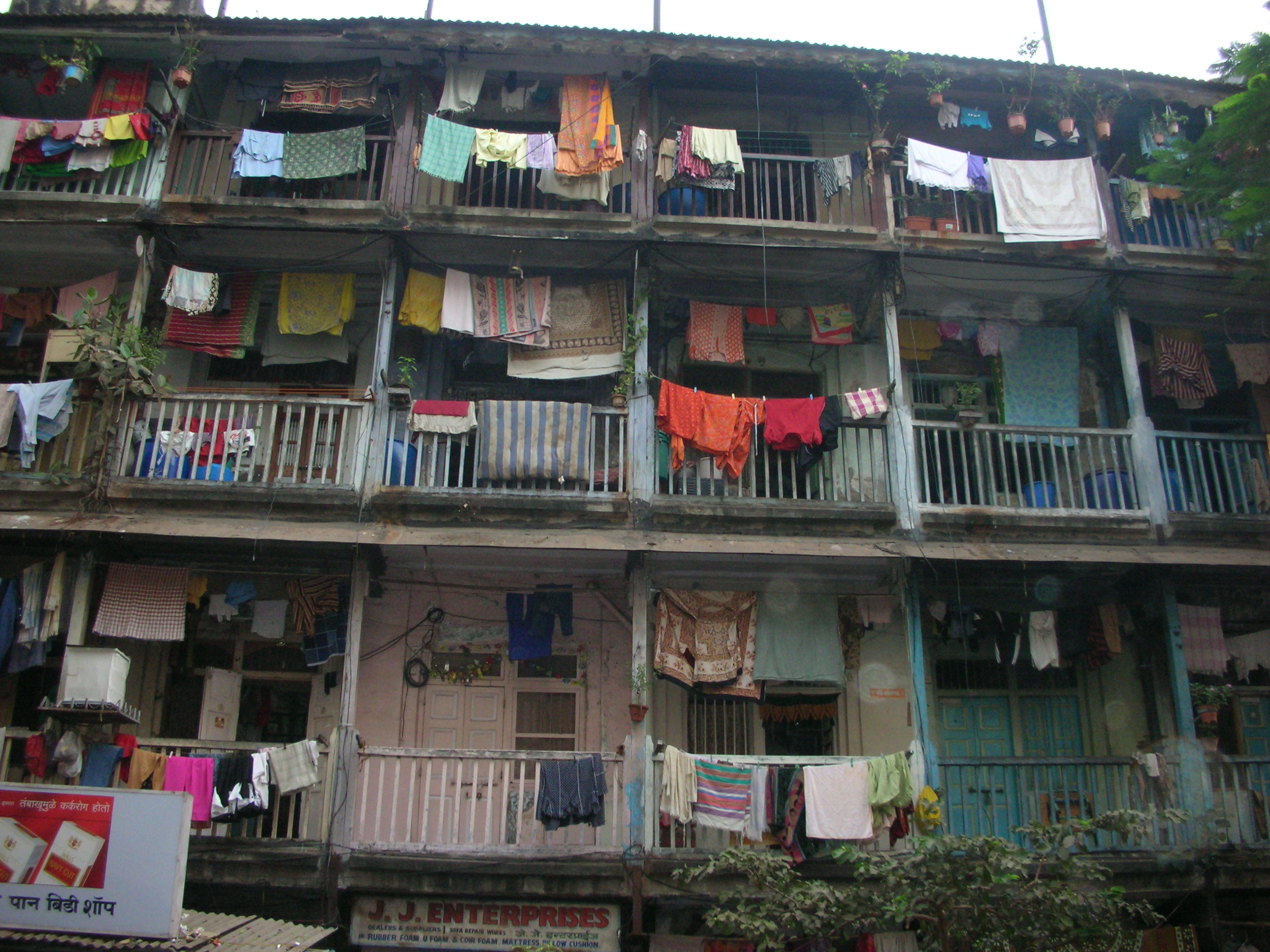
A chawl in Mumbai

"Chawls" are found in India. They are typically four to five story buildings with 10 to 20 kholis (tenements) on each floor, kholis literally meaning 'rooms'. Many chawl buildings can be found in Mumbai, where chawls were constructed by the thousands to house people migrating to the large city because of its booming cotton mills and overall strong economy.

A typical chawl tenement consists of one all-purpose room, which functions both as a living and sleeping space, and a kitchen which also serves as a dining room. A frequent practice is for the kitchen to also serve as a bedroom for a newly married couple in order to give them some degree of privacy.

=== Poland ===
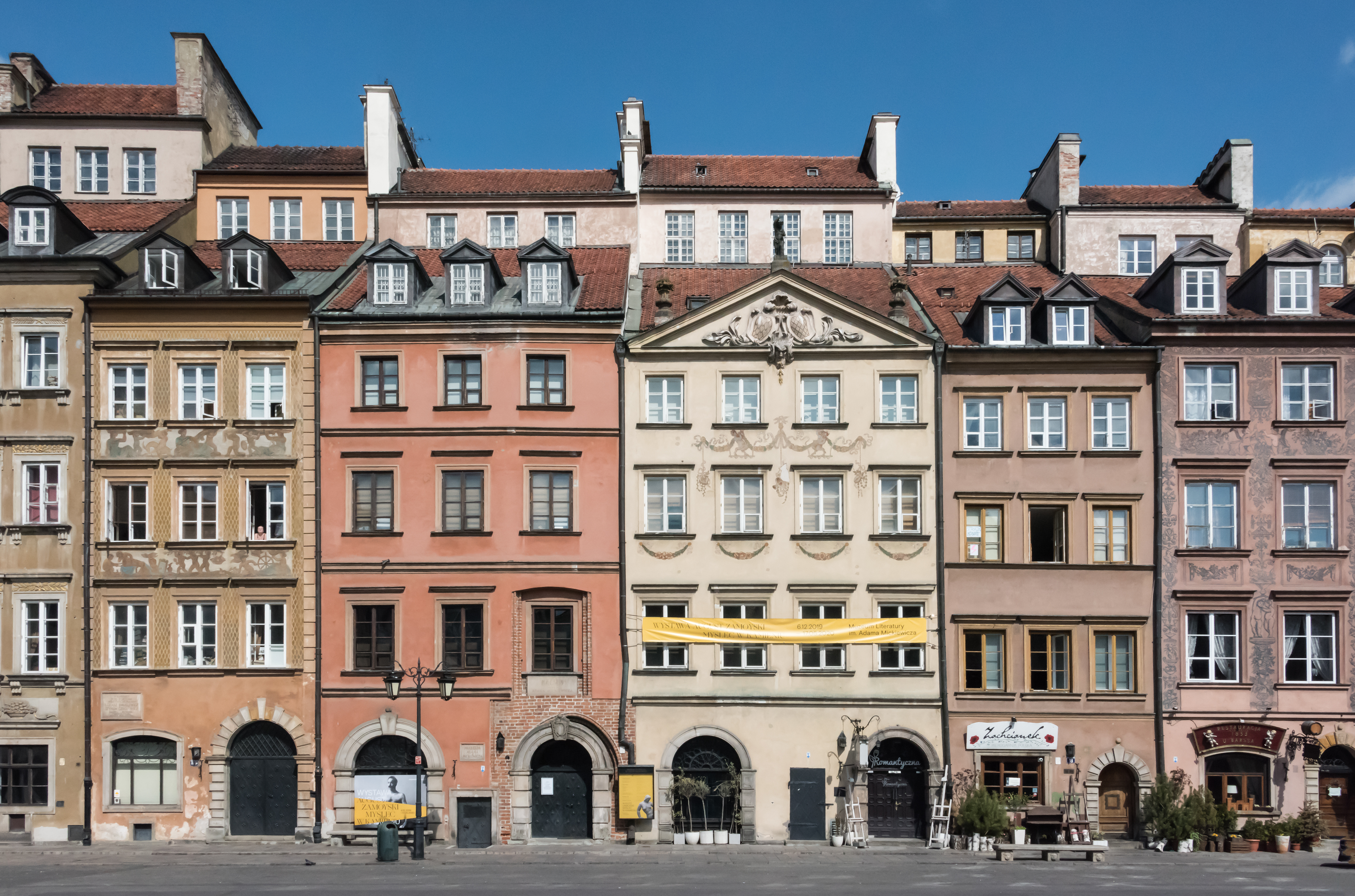
Tenements in Warsaw Old Town, Market Place

Kamienica (plural: kamienice) is a Polish term describing a type of residential tenement building made of brick or stone, with at least two floors. Word "kamienica" in Polish language literally means "stone building" and derives from the Polish word kamień (stone) and dates from the 15th century.

There are two basic types: one designed as a single-family residence, which existed until the 1800s (a burgher house), and the other designed as multi-family housing, which emerged in the 19th century and was the basic type of housing in cities.

From the architectural point of view, the word is usually used to describe a building that abuts other similar buildings forming the street frontage, in the manner of a terraced house. The ground floor often consists of shops and other businesses, while the upper floors are apartments, oftentimes spanning the entire floor.

Kamienice have large windows in the front, but not in the side walls, since the buildings are close together.The first type of kamienica is most prevalent especially in centers of historical cities such as Kraków, Poznań, Wrocław and Toruń, whereas the second type is most prominent in Łódź – city of neogothic factories and eclectic or Art Nouveau residences and tenements. Other city which is known for beautiful kamienice in Art Nouveau style is also Bydgoszcz.

Late 19th century and early 20th century kamienice often took form of city palaces with ornamental facades, high floors and spacious, representative and heavily decorated interiors. Later in the 20th century, especially after the Second World War, large apartments would be divided into several smaller flats due to general lack of habitable space caused by vast destruction of cities, thus lowering the generally high standard of living in so-called grand city tenements (Polish: kamienice wielkomiejskie). Examples of kamienice include Korniakt Palace and Black Kamienica in Lviv.

== See also ==
- Cortiço, tenements in Portuguese-speaking countries
- Rooming house
- Boarding house
- NIMBY
- Townhouse
- Urban decay
