= Rosa Luna =

Uruguayan dancer and Carnival vedette

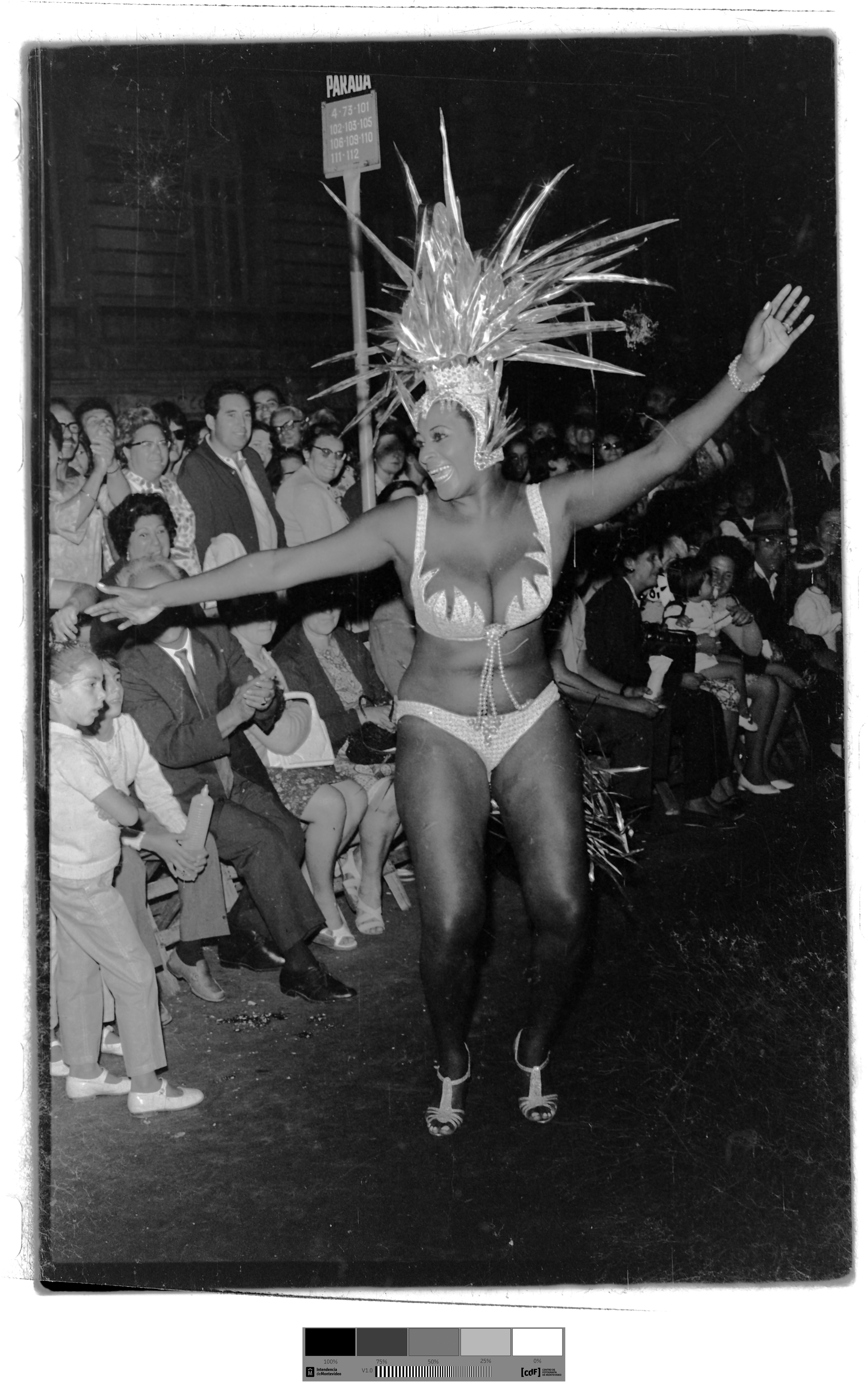
- Born: Rosa Amelia Luna; May 28, 1937; Montevideo, Uruguay
- Died: June 13, 1993 (aged 55); Toronto, Canada
- Occupation: dancer

Rosa Amelia Luna (May 28, 1937 – June 13, 1993) was a Uruguayan dancer and Carnival vedette. She was considered to be a living legend of Uruguayan dance.

== Biography ==
Rosa Amelia Luna was born in the Mediomundo conventillo in Barrio Sur, Montevideo on May 28, 1937, (Note: Luna was born on May 28, but was registered on June 20.) eldest daughter of the 14 children of Ceferina Luna, a poor washerwoman of African descent. Her father was the composer and carnival artist Luis Alberto "Fino" Carballo, who did not recognize her as his daughter until she was an adult.

At the age of nine, her stepfather sent her to work as a maid for wealthy people. She later began performing as a vedette dancer, performing candombe dance in the Uruguayan Carnival. She began performing with various groups, later establishing her own candombe group.

She participated in a radio program about the carnival and performed in theatre productions and shows in cafés. She also wrote articles for newspapers. Luna performed in various South American countries, as well as in Cuba, the Dominican Republic, Mexico, Australia, Spain, Italy, the United States and Canada.

She was married twice: her second husband was Raúl Abirad. In 1988, she published an autobiography Sin tanga y sin tongo, with Abirad as co-author.

Luna died of a heart attack at the age of 55 while performing in Canada.

In 2017, a series of performances by candombe groups and works of art inspired by Luna were presented to mark the 80th anniversary of her birth.

== Activism and advocacy ==
Luna was a supporter of the National Party and its leader Wilson Ferreira Aldunate.
