= Afro-Uruguayans =

Uruguayans of predominantly African descent

Afrouruguayos (Spanish)
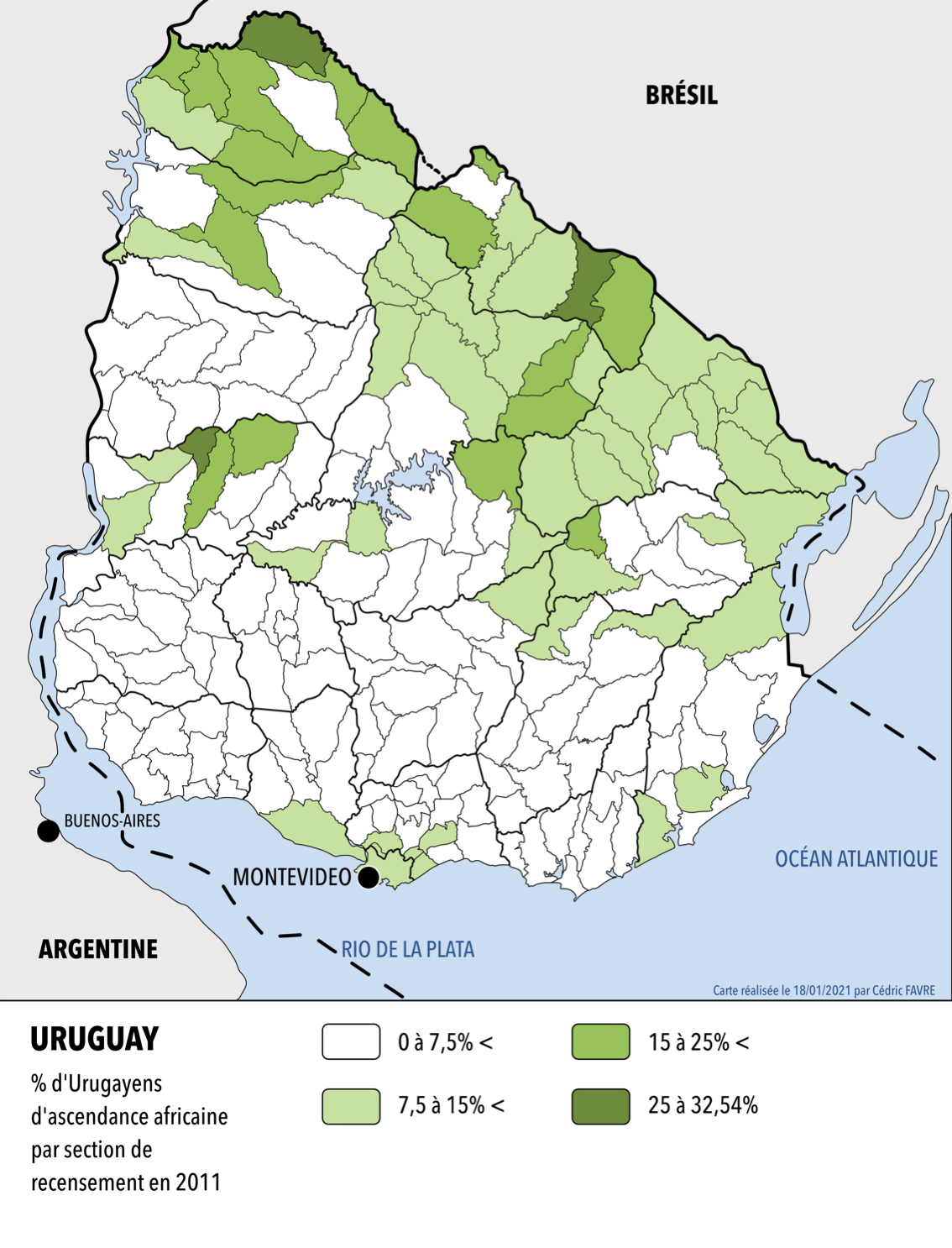
- Proportion of Black Uruguayans in each municipality according to the 2011 census

Total population
- Full or predominant ancestry 370,894 (2023 census); 6.9% of the total Uruguayan population Full, predominant or partial ancestry 10.6% of the total Uruguayan population

Regions with significant populations
- Montevideo (Barrio Sur and Palermo) and near the border with Brazil

Languages
- Spanish (Rioplatense) · Portuñol

Religion
- Catholic (85%); Evangelical (6%); Ethnic religions (7%); Non-religious (2%)

Related ethnic groups
- Other Afro-Latin Americans

Afro-Uruguayans (Spanish: Afrouruguayos), also known as Black Uruguayans (Spanish: Uruguayos negros), are Uruguayans with predominantly or total Black African ancestry. Afro-Uruguayans are generally considered the second-largest ethnic group in the country, although in much smaller numbers compared to the majority European-descended population, as they make up less than 11% of Uruguay's population.

People of African descent first arrived in Uruguay during the period of Spanish colonization, when many were forcibly brought as slaves. Following the abolition of slavery in the mid-19th century, a significant number of Afro-Brazilians settled in the country’s northeastern region, as the borders between Uruguay and the Empire of Brazil were poorly defined and slavery persisted in Brazil at the time.

Afro-Uruguayan groups seeking political advancement first began to organize in the 1930s. Throughout the late 20th century and early 21st century, various organizations have arisen to combat racism in Uruguay, and promote Afro-Uruguayan culture. Afro-Uruguayans remain largely economically disadvantaged, and primarily work in the manufacturing, construction, and domestic help industries.

Afro-Uruguayan culture, including song and dance, is showcased prominently in Uruguayan Carnival celebrations.

== Terminology ==
The term "Afro-Uruguayans" has been deemed problematic by some. Critics of the term say it diminishes relations of these individuals in black communities and is much too specific because of mixed cultures. To strengthen the connections between black communities back in the 1800s, "Orientals" is more fitting in regards to modern-day Uruguay, rather than "Afro-Uruguayans" because of lands history and origin.

== History ==
The region of Uruguay has a complex history of militias and military action. Colonial militia service went hand in hand with slave enrollment during wars of independence. These militias, specifically the colonial Black militias centered in the Rio de la Plata had opened themselves to the idea of taking in slaves to strengthen their military, meaning both free and enslaved men of African descent fought together in battles after 1810. The gain of slaves allowed the addition of people, mixing races, ideals and class levels. Black recruits within the militia had mixed thoughts on the military, some soldiers seeing the military as a burden versus black officers seeing potential in the militias. The new recruits taken in, in the form of slaves provided more soldiers that would be fighting for Uruguay on foot. The slaves involved in these militias, also called "citizen-soldiers" were able to defend their rights and gain some freedom through their service. This new form of freedom allowed enslaved and free men alike to create black communities, where soldiers would create identities and be one with society. Slave ships bringing over soldiers brewed collected identities to interact with one another and create social networks. These networks allowed Africans and their descendants to push against domination within the Spanish Regime. All men strong enough and of African descent were impacted by the military regardless to if they were already in a battalion or an emerging battalion. Men of color who were free were sometime forced to serve along white men before 1841 Even with the pressure of the military some Africans willingly joined militias before slavery was abolished.

Black communities in these Militias allowed Africans to feel a sense of belonging and helping them ease into colonial societies such as the Republic of Uruguay. Up till 1830, black soldiers were responsible for the establishment and creation of the first professional Uruguayan infantry, only to be followed by all African men of ancestry being added into the army of Guerra Grande from 1839 to 1852 and freed. With the freedom of slaves, unlike before, where black soldiers were commanded by white officers, now, anyone from black battalions could participate in military networks. Black militia officers gained legal privileges and contributed in national politics because of the ban on slavery. Along with the anti slavery laws set in Uruguay, any newly arrived slaves would be freed and be reintroduced as "African colonist". As new recruits of black soldiers flowed in, the freed individuals were able to connect more with commanders and people in units and create social strategies in these new formations. The building of Uruguay and its success hinges mainly on its military, the black militias and their actions based on African-born population In the second half of the 18th Century after the abolishment of slavery, a war in the Río de la Plata deployed free black militias. These militias were spread from Paraguay to Montevideo African troops were ordered to march beside the Spanish to fight the Guaraní missions on the Uruguay River. Over this mass of land, the Militia service hosted opportunities for isolated black populations to make contact and create bonds with the militias. These interactions allowed more men to join and prolong the development of these associations. African influence in the military was vast, and the militias took in these traditions to celebrate and honor African culture.

The Day of Kings was a celebration portrayed by Africans and was heavily influenced by the Catholic religion and how it was mixed with African ideals. African traditions were incorporated into the Military uniforms and flag of Uruguay to capture the sense of community and the value of culture. This furthered the sense of belonging in these militias, where African battalions could highlight their military role in the founding of the nation.

=== 20th century ===
During the 1930s, Afro-Uruguayan intellectuals founded the Partido Autoctono Negro (PAN) to elect Afro-Uruguayans to legislative bodies. However, the party largely failed, as most Afro-Uruguayans rejected the idea of a race-based party, and instead voted for the two mainstream political parties. Around this time, the Asociación Cultural y Social del Uruguay Negro was established.

In the 1980s, Mundo Afro, another sizeable Afro-Uruguayan organization, was founded.

=== Recent immigration trends ===
At the beginning of the 21st century there are some Nigerians, Cameroonians, Senegalese and other African immigrants. Additionally, in the border region in the north of the country with Brazil Afro-Brazilians have become an increasingly large part of the population.

== Demographics ==
Afro-Uruguayan Population Census 2023, by department
Department	Rank	% Afro-Uruguayans
Artigas	1	21.8%
Rivera	2	21.0%
Cerro Largo	5	13.0%
Salto	4	14.5%
Tacurembo	3	15.1%
Montevideo	8	10.7%
Treinta y Tres	6	12.2%
Canelones	10	9.3%
Rocha	7	10.9%
Río Negro	12	8.5%
Durazno	9	9.8%
San José	14	7.4%
Maldonado	13	7.5%
Florida	15	7.0%
Lavalleja	16	6.4%
Paysandú	11	8.9%
Flores	18	5.3%
Soriano	17	5.8%
Colonia	19	4.8%

== Culture ==
Afro-Uruguayans have made significant contributions to Uruguayan culture, including in the fields of music, dance, art, and writing. A number of words in Uruguayan Spanish originate from the country's Afro-Uruguayan community.

=== Candombe ===
Candombe is a style of music and dance that originated in Uruguay, among the descendants of liberated African slaves. In 2009, the United Nations Educational, Scientific and Cultural Organization (UNESCO) inscribed candombe in its Representative List of the Intangible Cultural Heritage of Humanity.

To a lesser extent, candombe is practiced in Argentina, Paraguay, and Brazil. In Argentina, it can be found in Buenos Aires, Santa Fe, Paraná, and Corrientes. In Paraguay, this tradition continues in Camba Cuá and in Fernando de la Mora near Asunción. In Brazil, candombe retains its religious character and can be found in the states of Minas Gerais and Rio Grande do Sul.

This Uruguayan music style is based on three different drums: chico, repique, and piano drums. It is usually played in February during carnival in Montevideo at dance parades called llamadas and desfile inaugural del carnaval.

=== Afro-Uruguayan cuisine ===
Afro-Uruguayan cuisine refers to the culinary traditions of the Afro-Uruguayans. The cuisine is influenced by the African heritage of the community, as well as the local ingredients and cooking techniques of Uruguay. While specific dishes may vary, here are a few examples of Afro-Uruguayan food:

Mandioca: Also known as cassava or yuca, mandioca is a staple in Afro-Uruguayan cuisine. It is often boiled, fried, or used to make a traditional dish called "mazamorra," which is a thick porridge made from cassava flour.

Mondongo: This is a hearty soup made from tripe (the lining of a cow's stomach) and various vegetables. Mondongo is seasoned with spices and often served with cornbread or rice.

Asado negro: This dish is a variation of the popular Uruguayan barbecue, known as "asado." Asado negro features marinated beef, cooked slowly until it develops a rich, dark crust. It is usually accompanied by chimichurri sauce and served with traditional sides like potatoes or salad.

Dulce de batata: This is a sweet treat made from sweet potatoes. The potatoes are boiled until tender, mashed, and then cooked with sugar until thickened. The result is a delicious paste that can be enjoyed on its own or used as a filling for pastries and desserts.

These are just a few examples of Afro-Uruguayan food. The cuisine is diverse and has influences from both African and Uruguayan culinary traditions, creating a unique fusion of flavors and ingredients.

== Afro-feminism ==
There is an Afro-Uruguayan trend within the feminist movement.

== Afro-Uruguayans ==
=== Historical ===
- Joaquín Lenzina, freed slave and poet

=== Politics ===
==== Activism ====
- Adelia Silva (1925–2004), educator and poet, who had a significant role in improving civil rights for Afro-Uruguayans
- Sandra Chagas, dancer and activist

==== Government ====
- Edgardo Ortuño, minister of environment (previously: industries).
- Alba Roballo, politician
- Gloria Rodríguez Santo, politician

=== Arts ===
==== Poetry ====
- Virginia Brindis de Salas, poet

==== Cabaret ====
- Tina Ferreira, journalist and vedette
- Martha Gularte, candombe dancer, choreographer, poet and vedette
- Rosa Luna, dancer and vedette

==== Music ====
- Alvaro Salas, candombe percussionist
- Rubén Rada, candombe singer
- Cayetano Alberto Silva, musician

=== Sports ===
==== Track and Field ====
- Déborah Rodríguez, Olympic hurdelist and fashion model

==== Football ====
- Abel Hernández, football player
- Alexis Rolín, football player
- Álvaro Pereira, football player
- Ángel Rodríguez, football player
- Carina Felipe, football player
- Carlos Diogo, football player
- Carlos Sánchez, football player
- Coquito, football player
- Darwin Núñez, football player
- Darío Silva, football player
- David Terans, football player
- Diego Arismendi, football player
- Diego Rolán, football player
- Egidio Arévalo Ríos, football player
- Felipe Carvalho, football player
- Gonzalo Carneiro ,football player
- Isabelino Gradín, football player
- José Leandro Andrade, football player
- Keisy Silveira, football player
- Luis Suárez, football player
- Marcelo Romero, football player
- Marcelo Zalayeta, football player
- Mario Regueiro, football player
- Nicolás Olivera, football player
- Nicolás de la Cruz,football player
- Obdulio Varela, football player
- Pamela González, football player
- Richard Morales, football player
- Rodrigo Aguirre, football player
- Ronald Araújo, football player
- Rubén Olivera, football player
- Santiago García, football player
- Santiago Mouriño, football player
- Víctor Diogo, football player
- Víctor Rodríguez Andrade, football player
- Wendy Carballo, football player
- Yannel Correa, football player
