= San Antonio y Santa Clara, Montevideo =

Roman Catholic parish church in Montevideo, Uruguay

Coordinates: 34°54′29.5″S 56°10′45″W

Iglesia de San Antonio y Santa Clara
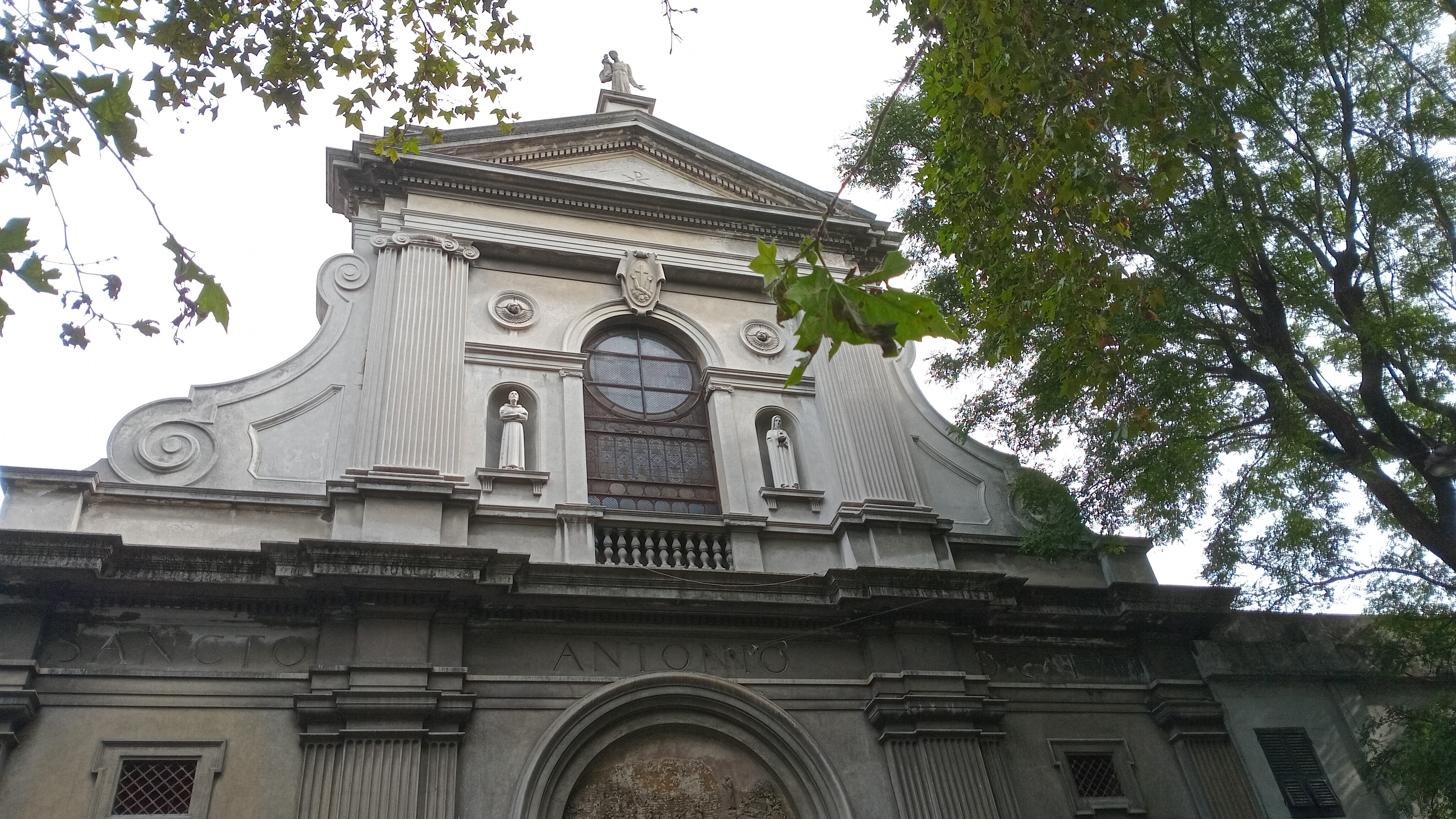

Religion
- Affiliation: Roman Catholic
- Ecclesiastical or organizational status: Parish church

Location
- Location: Canelones 1680; Montevideo, Uruguay
- Interactive map of Iglesia de San Antonio y Santa Clara

Architecture
- Type: Church
- Direction of façade: North

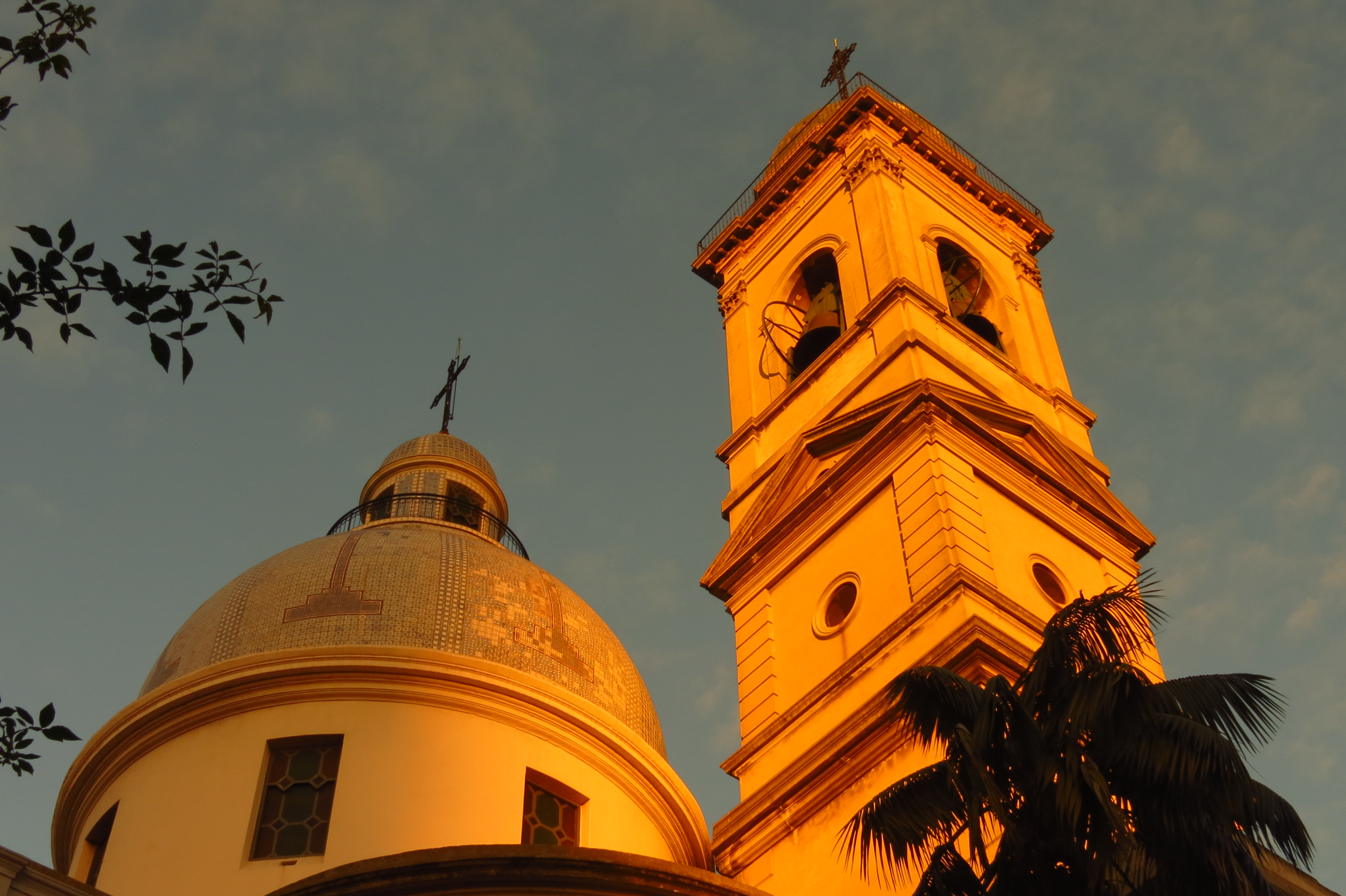

The Church of Saint Anthony and Saint Clare (Spanish: Iglesia de San Antonio y Santa Clara) is a Roman Catholic parish church in Montevideo, Uruguay.

== Overview ==
This church is part of an important architectural ensemble which includes a convent; it is located on the intersection of the streets Canelones and Minas, in the barrio Palermo. The parish was established on 7 September 1961.

Held by the Friars Minor Capuchin, who have a long history in the territory of Uruguay since colonial times and now conform a Province with Argentina. The church is dedicated to Saint Anthony of Padua and Saint Clare of Assisi.

It boasts a Tamburini organ from 1924, one of the biggest in the country.

== Same devotion ==
There are other churches in Uruguay dedicated to Saint Anthony of Padua:

- St. Anthony of Padua Church in Pueblo Nuevo, near Las Piedras
- St. Anthony of Padua Parish Church in San Antonio
- St. Anthony of Padua Parish Church in Sarandí del Yí
- Parish Church of St. Anthony of Padua and Our Lady of the Valley in Aiguá
