= Barrio Sur, Montevideo =

Barrio Sur
- Barrio
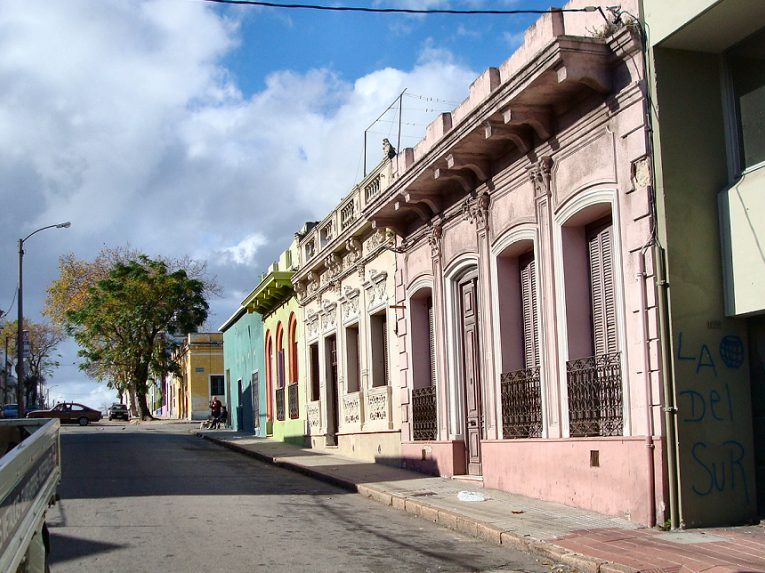
- Street in Barrio Sur

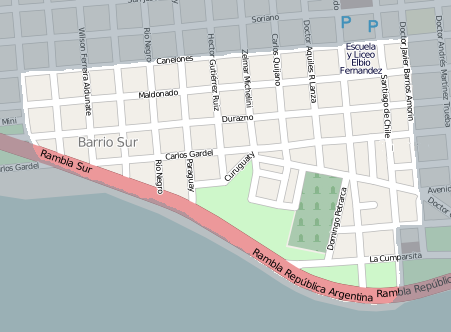
- Street map of Barrio Sur

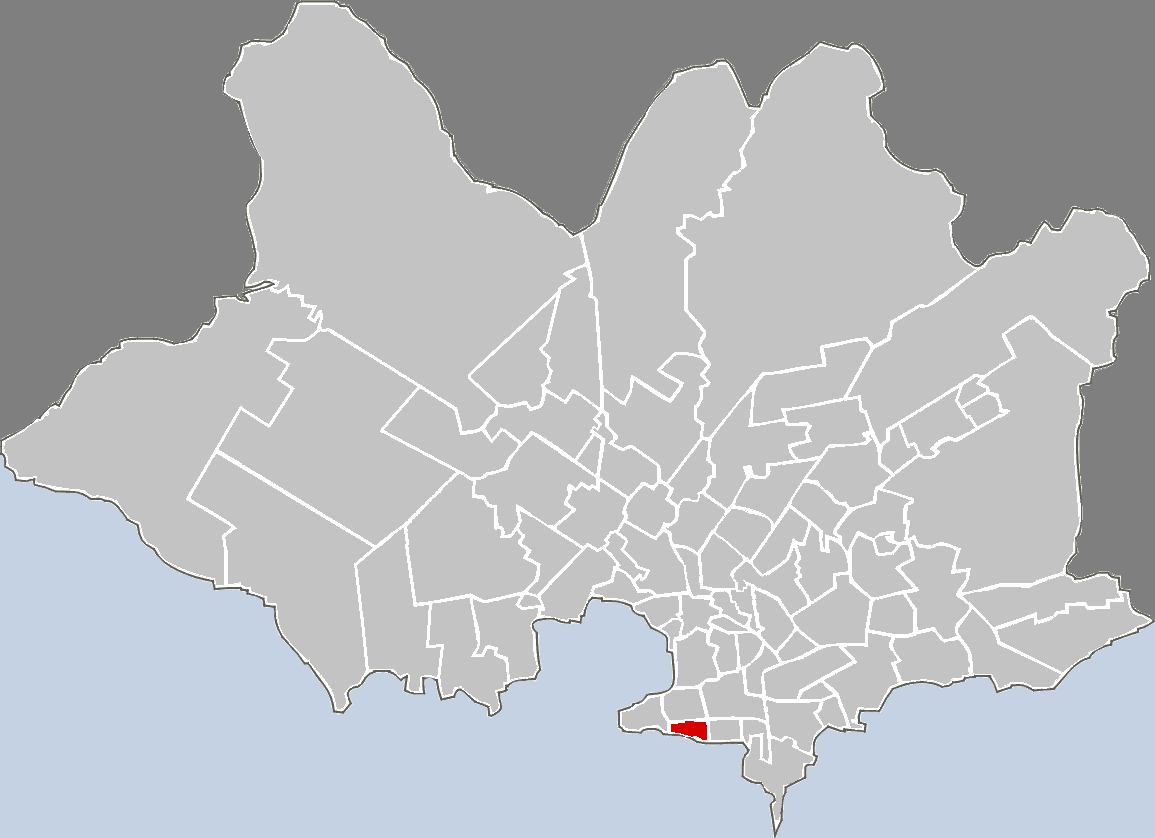
- Location of Barrio Sur in Montevideo
- Coordinates: 34°54′46″S 56°11′19″W
- Country: Uruguay
- Department: Montevideo Department
- City: Montevideo

Barrio Sur is a barrio (neighbourhood or district) of Montevideo, Uruguay. It borders Ciudad Vieja to the west, Centro to the north, Palermo to the east and the coastline to the south.

Politically located in the Municipality B, along with Palermo, it is the place where most of the Uruguayan Carnival festivities take place. In the first half of the 20th century, the neighbourhood became a melting pot of different cultures, due to the immigrants who settled in the area.

== History ==
The neighborhood emerged in the first half of the 19th century, when the city walls were demolished, and a part of the population –mainly Afro-Uruguayans, who had been freed after the abolition of slavery in 1842– began to settle in the southern area of the city, living in tenements called conventillos, such as the Mediomundo.

The first inhabitants of the neighborhood maintained some of the rituals of their countries of origin. From these rituals the Candombe was born. Starting at the end of the 19th century and during the first half of the 20th century, the area was inhabited by thousands of European immigrants. Due to this, the neighborhood became a melting pot of Afro-Uruguayan, Spanish, Italian, and Jewish cultures.

The southwest area of the neighborhood was part of El Bajo, red-light district that also included part of the south of Ciudad Vieja, and which contained a large number of cabarets and brothels. It was demolished in the 1930s due to the construction of the south rambla.

== Culture ==
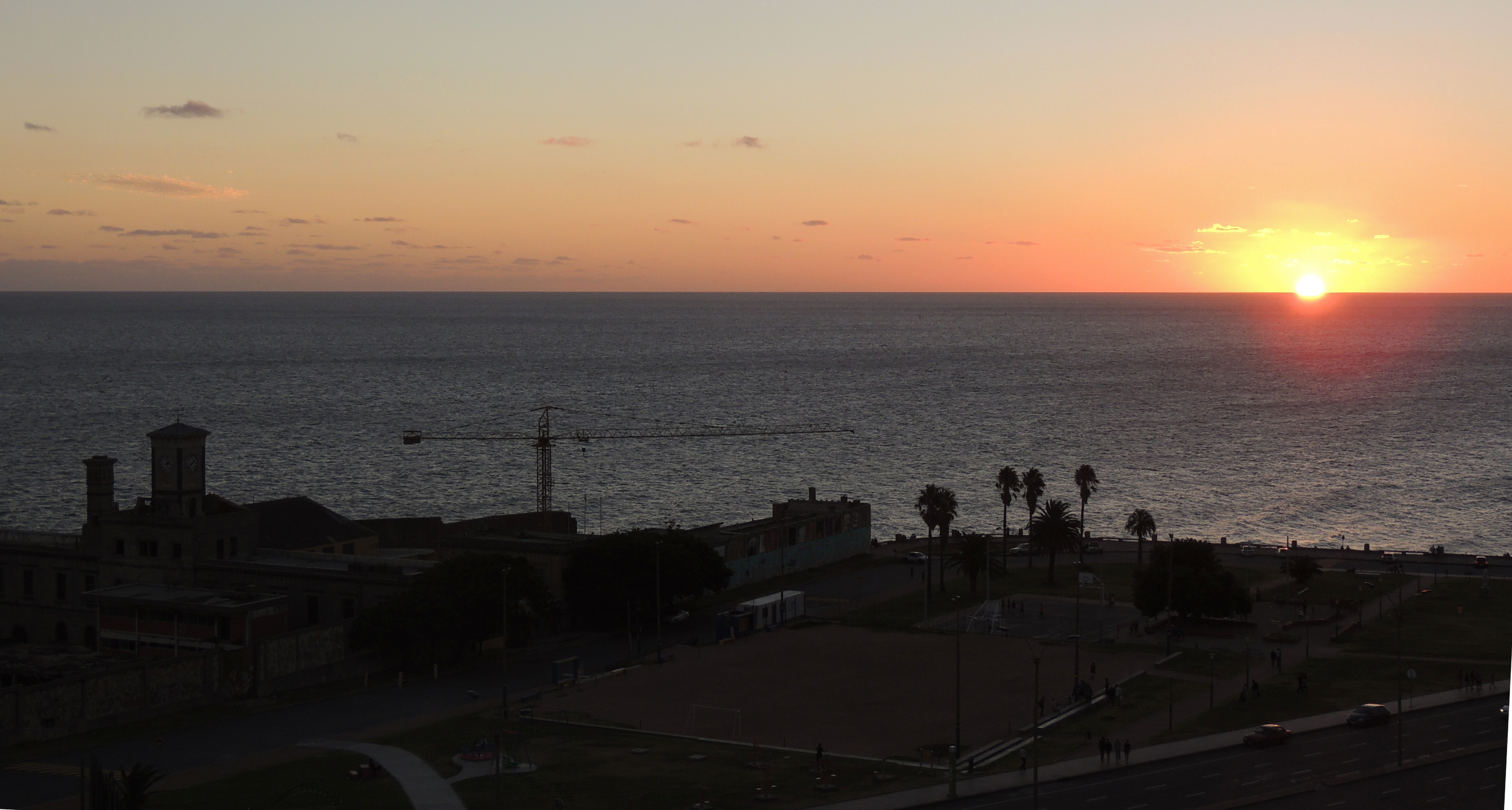
View at sunset in Barrio Sur

Barrio Sur remains connected to Afro-Uruguay culture to this day. It is central to the Carnival festivities and Candombe is regularly played during the weekends.

In 2022, the mayor of Montevideo, Carolina Cosse, proposed renaming a street in Barrio Sur to honor the LGBT rights activist and travesti, Gloria Meneses.

== Places of worship ==
- Church of St. Joseph and St. Maximilian Kolbe, also known as "Conventuales" (Roman Catholic, Conventual Franciscans)

== See also ==
- Barrios of Montevideo
