= Palermo, Montevideo =

Palermo
- Barrio
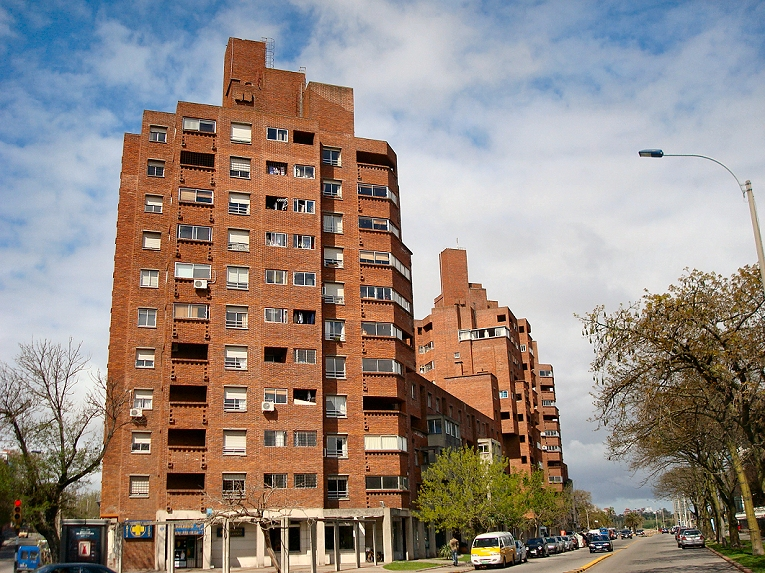
- Conjunto Habitacional Rambla

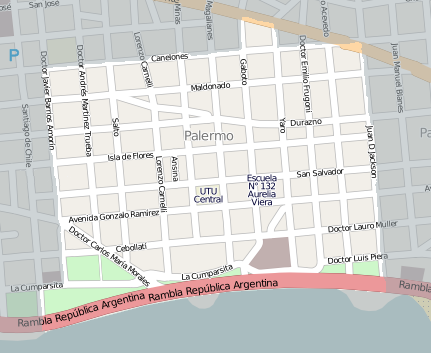
- Street map of Palermo

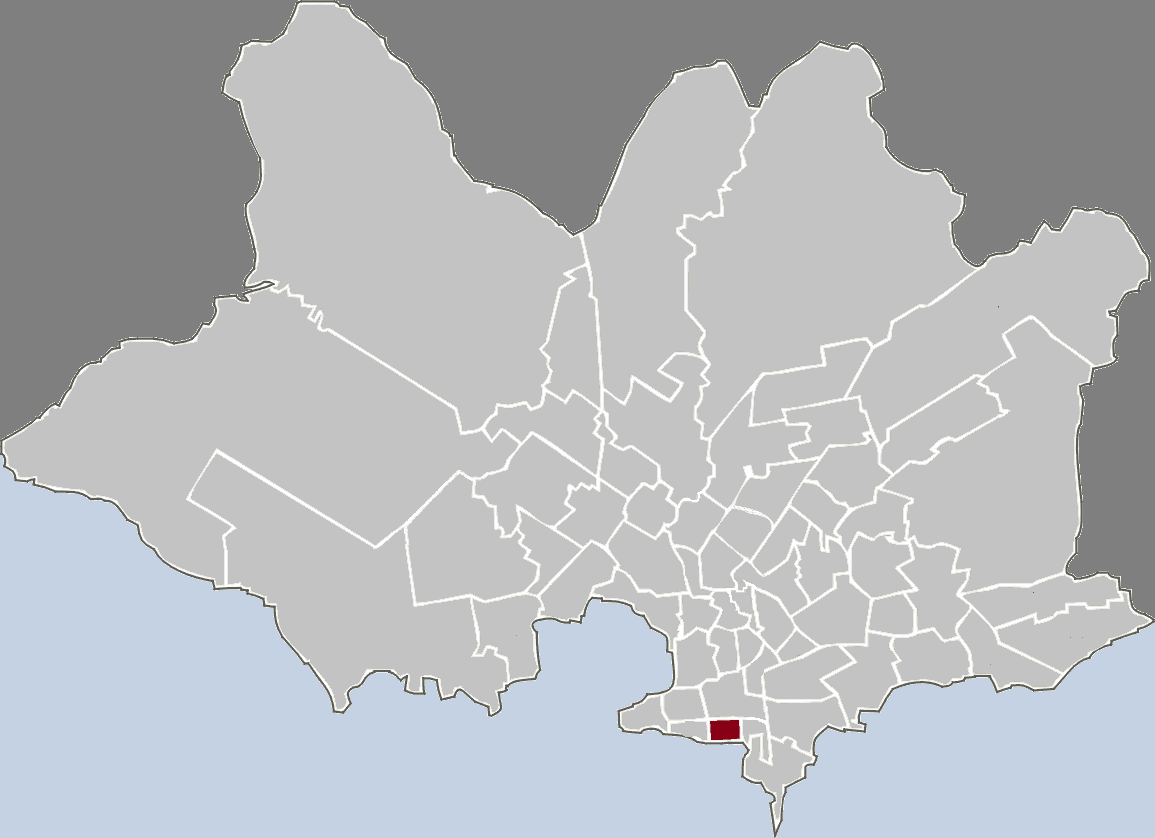
- Location of Palermo in Montevideo
- Coordinates: 34°54′44″S 56°10′53″W
- Country: Uruguay
- Department: Montevideo Department
- City: Montevideo

Palermo is a barrio (neighbourhood or district) of Montevideo, Uruguay. It borders Barrio Sur to the west, Cordón to the north and Parque Rodó to the east, while to the south it borders the coastline.

Politically located in Municipality B of Montevideo, it is together with Barrio Sur the center of the Uruguayan carnival and a melting pot of different cultures since the end of the 19th century. Named after the Italian city Palermo, it is the site of the headquarters of the Latin American Integration Association (ALADI) and the Embassy of the United States.

== History ==
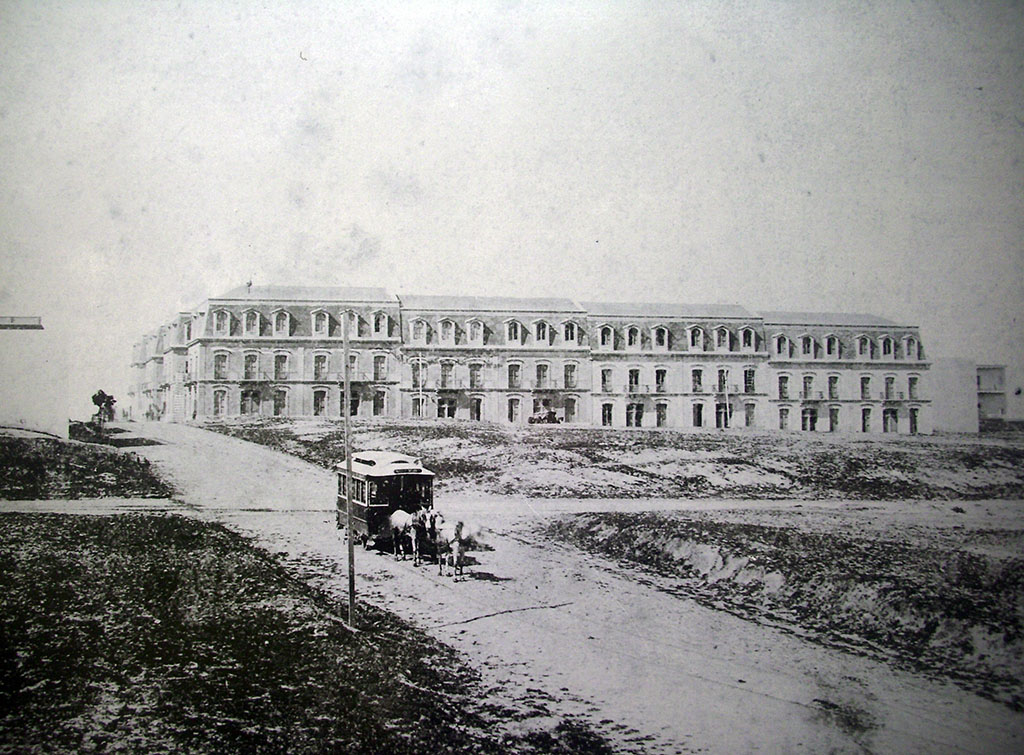
Reus al Sur in the 19th century

The neighborhood emerged in the second half of the 19th century with the expansion of the Barrio Sur towards the east of the Central Cemetery of Montevideo. It was an unattractive area due to the storms that hit it and the proximity to the cemetery, so low-income people settled there. The area began to be called Palermo in the 1860s due to the existence of a store owned by Sicilian immigrants, whose sign read: Almacén de Comestibles de la Nueva Ciudad de Palermo (Spanish for 'Grocery Store of the New City of Palermo').

In 1887, businessman Emilio Reus began to build Reus al Sur, a housing area that bears its name and which has a twin in the Villa Muñoz neighborhood, Reus al Norte. Throughout the second half of the 19th century and the first half of the 20th, a large number of immigrants from Europe settled in the neighborhood, mainly Italians and Spaniards, as well as Jews from different countries.

In addition to European immigrants, many Afro-Uruguayans who with the abolition of slavery in 1842 moved to the southern area of the city, living in collective housing known as conventillos. In these conventillos, the Afro population maintained their old traditions and rituals, such as making music with marching drums, originating to Candombe. Due to this, the neighborhood is the center of the Uruguayan Carnival festivities, since along its Isla de Flores street –which also runs through Barrio Sur– the Desfile de Llamadas is held annually, in which a large number of comparsas parade, emulating the slave marches during the colonial era.

At the beginning of the 20th century, there was a beach, but in the 1930s the Rambla Sur was built, so it was removed and its mass of water moved towards the current coastal limit. Much of the neighborhood is land reclaimed from the sea.

== Landmarks ==
Palermo is characterized by the existence of old buildings, as well as narrow streets and sidewalks.

In the central area of the neighborhood stands the building of the University of Labor of Uruguay. Built in an eclectic style, it was a disciplinary center to educate young people with behavioral problems and juvenile delinquents. The headquarters of the Latin American Integration Association and the Cannabis Museum, opened in 2016, are also located in the area.

In the southern area near the coast is the Embassy of the United States and the Espacio Libre Alemania, a public square around which stands the Embassy of the Federal Republic of Germany, as well as the headquarters of the Postal Union of the Americas, Spain and Portugal (UPAEP) and the Uruguayan multinational PedidosYa. In addition, high-rise apartment buildings similar to Soviet Khrushchevkas were built along the coastline in the 1980s.

== Places of worship ==
- Church and convent of St. Anthony and St. Clare (Roman Catholic, Friars Minor Capuchin)
- Parish Church of Our Lady of the Orchard and St. Joseph (Roman Catholic)
