= Municipality B (Montevideo) =

- Municipality
- Municipio B
- Location of Municipality B in the Montevideo Department.
- Coordinates: 34°53′57″N 56°10′45″W
- Country: Uruguay
- department: Montevideo

Population
  - Total: 147,762
  - Density: 12,417/km^{2} (32,160/sq mi)
- Time zone: UTC-3

Municipality B is one of the eight municipalities of Montevideo, Uruguay. It is one of the smallest and central municipalities of the city, occupying part of the southern end of the department, on the waters of the Río de la Plata. A large part of the municipality has an administrative and port function.

It was created through decree 11,567 of September 13, 2009, later ratified.

== Population ==
According to the 2009 census data, the municipality had an approximate population of 120,000 inhabitants.

== Neighborhoods ==
Each of the municipalities of Montevideo is subdivided into neighborhoods (barrios). Specifically, municipality B is made up of the following neighborhoods: La Aguada, Barrio Sur, Centro, Ciudad Vieja, Cordón, Palermo and Parque Rodó.

== See also ==
- Municipalities of Uruguay
