= Sandra Chagas =

Argentine activist (born 1964)

Sandra Chagas (born August 9, 1964 in Montevideo), sometimes known as Mary Sandra Chagas Techera, is an Afro-Uruguayan dancer and activist.

== Personal life ==
Her father (Juan Carlos Chagas) and her mother Santa Hilda Techera (aka Pocha) are Afro-Latino. She was born in Montevideo, Uruguay and moved to Argentina at age 14. Chagas self-describes as a "black woman, lesbian, and feminist."

== Afrocultural Movement ==
Chagas is a leader in the Afrocultural Movement (Movimiento Cultural Afro) in Argentina. The movement was created on April 20, 1987, in part to honor the memory of José "Dolphin" Acosta Martinez, also known as José "Delfin." The movement attempts to address racism and anti-blackness in Buenos Aires.

On December 13, 1998 the movement sponsored a parade of candombe drums and dancers in front of the Cabildo de Buenos Aires as part of the Kalakán Güé Project Tribute to Memory to draw attention to the losses and disappearances of persons of African descent. Chagas was one of a group of mothers who participated in the event.
