= Martha Gularte =

Uruguayan dancer, poet and vedette (1919–2002)

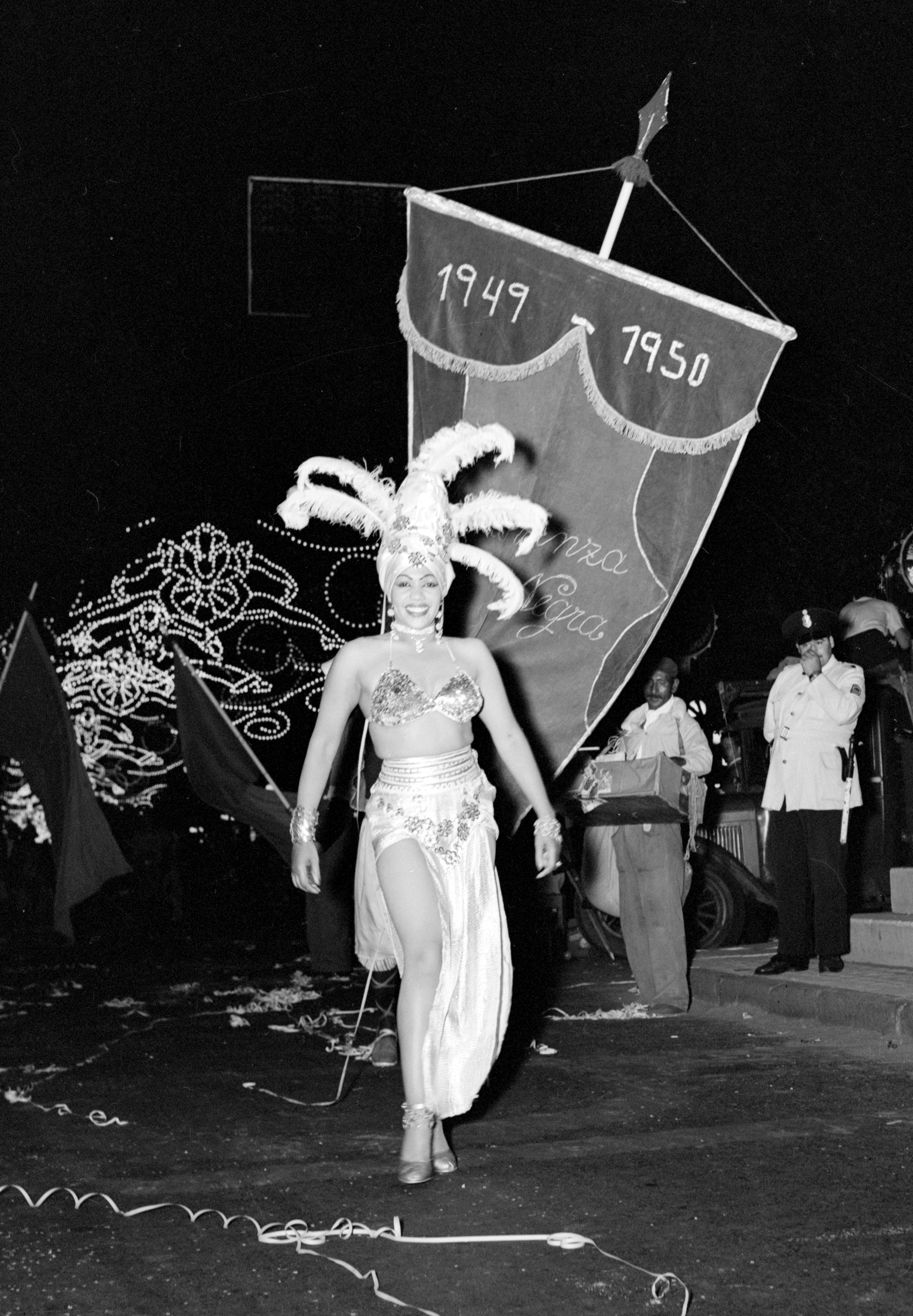
- Gularte in 1950
- Born: Fermina Gularte Bautista; 18 June 1919; Paso de los Novillos, Tacuarembó, Uruguay
- Died: 12 August 2002 (aged 83); Montevideo, Uruguay.
- Occupation(s): Candombe dancer, choreographer, poet and vedette
- Children: 2

Fermina Gularte Bautista (18 June 1919 – 12 August 2002), better known by her stage name Martha Gularte, was a Uruguayan candombe dancer, choreographer, poet and vedette. She became a symbol of carnival and Afro-Uruguayan culture.

== Early life and family ==
Fermina Gularte Bautista was born on a ranch in Paso de los Novillos, Tacuarembó, Uruguay, in 1919. Her paternal grandfather was an enslaved man in Brazil. Her white mother, Custodia Bautista, died when Gularte was aged 2.

Gularte spent her childhood in orphanages in Montevideo. She met the poet Juana de Ibarbourou who was visiting the orphanage. After leaving the orphanage, Gularte worked as a domestic servant. To escape the low pay of this job, she began to dance in cabarets from a young age.

== Career ==
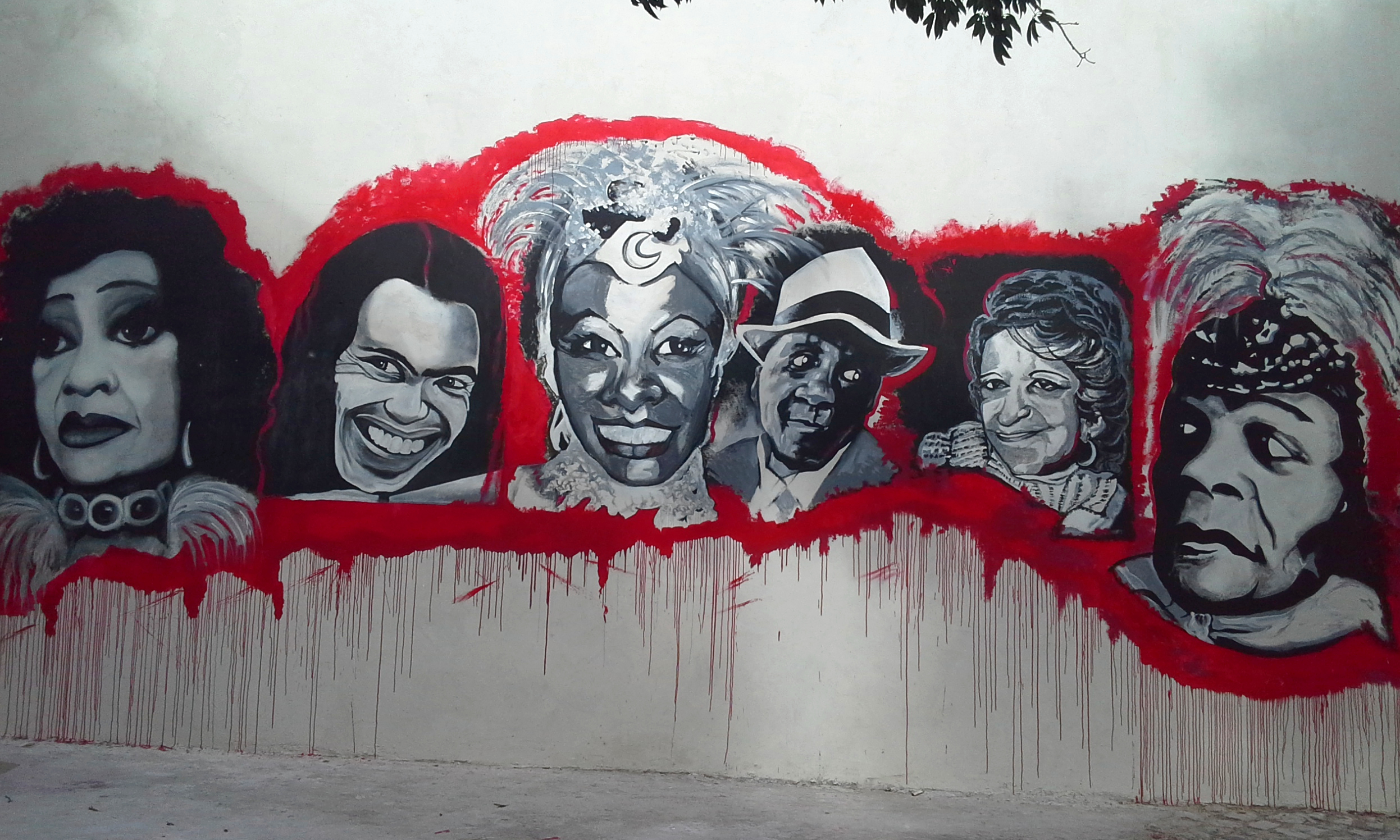
Gularte featured on the "Murals of the Plaza of the Carnival Museum" in Uruguay

Gularte danced in cabarets across South America, including in her home country of Uruguay, and in Argentina, Brazil and Chile. She pioneered the role of the female vedette, was a candombe dancer and became a symbol of the Uruguayan Carnival and Afro-Uruguayan culture, along with Rosa Luna. Playwright Fernán Silva Valdéz [es] described her as "a black flower with tambourine petals."

In 1946, Gularte was hired to work at Enrico Venturino Soto's "Caupolican Circus," but left as she did not like the roaring of the animals. In 1949, Gularte debuted with the group Añoranzas Negras. Gularte later moved to Spain, where she choreographed the cabaret "El Molino Rojo." In the 1960s, she joined the troupe Morenada. In 1982, she founded the Tanganika troupe with her children.

When in her 60s, Gularte began writing, publishing The Boatman of Jordan River, Song to the Bible in 1998. In 1999 she released an autobiography. Gularte also wrote poetry which reflected on Afro-Uruguayan history, losses of cultural continuity and estrangement from the African homeland.

Gularte continued to dance alongside writing, before announcing her retirement from the stage in February 2002. Shortly before she died, Gularte featured in the Uruguayan film In This Tricky Life by Beatriz Flores Silva.

== Personal life ==
Gulrte had two children, Jorginho and Katy. She gave birth to her son Jorginho, who had an American father, in Porto Alegre, Rio Grande do Sul, Brazil.

== Death and legacy ==
Gularte died on 12 August 2002 in Montevideo, Uruguay, aged 83. She is featured on the "Murals of the Plaza of the Carnival Museum" in Uruguay.
