= Uruguayan Carnival =

Popular national festival

Carnival
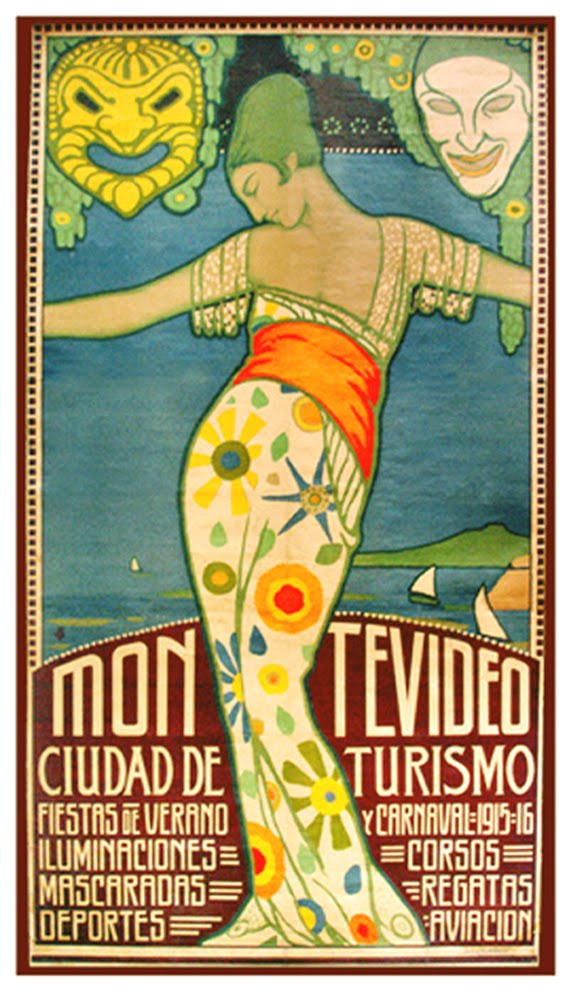
- Uruguayan Carnival in 1915 (Montevideo)
- Genre: Festival
- Begins: Mid-January
- Ends: Late February
- Country: Uruguay
- Major events: Dance parade

Carnival in Uruguay is a festival that takes place every year in Uruguay from mid January to late February. It is considered to be the longest carnival in the world. The Carnival draws root from candombe, Murga and tablados, which are forms of expression of Uruguayan culture through dance and music. From its conception, the Uruguayan Carnival has evolved into a dance parade in which different comparsas, groups of street performers in Latin American festivals, play the drums and dance at the "Desfile Inaugural del Carnaval" and "Desfile de Llamadas" parade. The biggest carnival celebrations are in the capital Montevideo and can last up to 40 days. They involve a series of cultural events such as dance parades in the streets, street stages called "tablados" and an artistic contest in the Teatro de Verano.

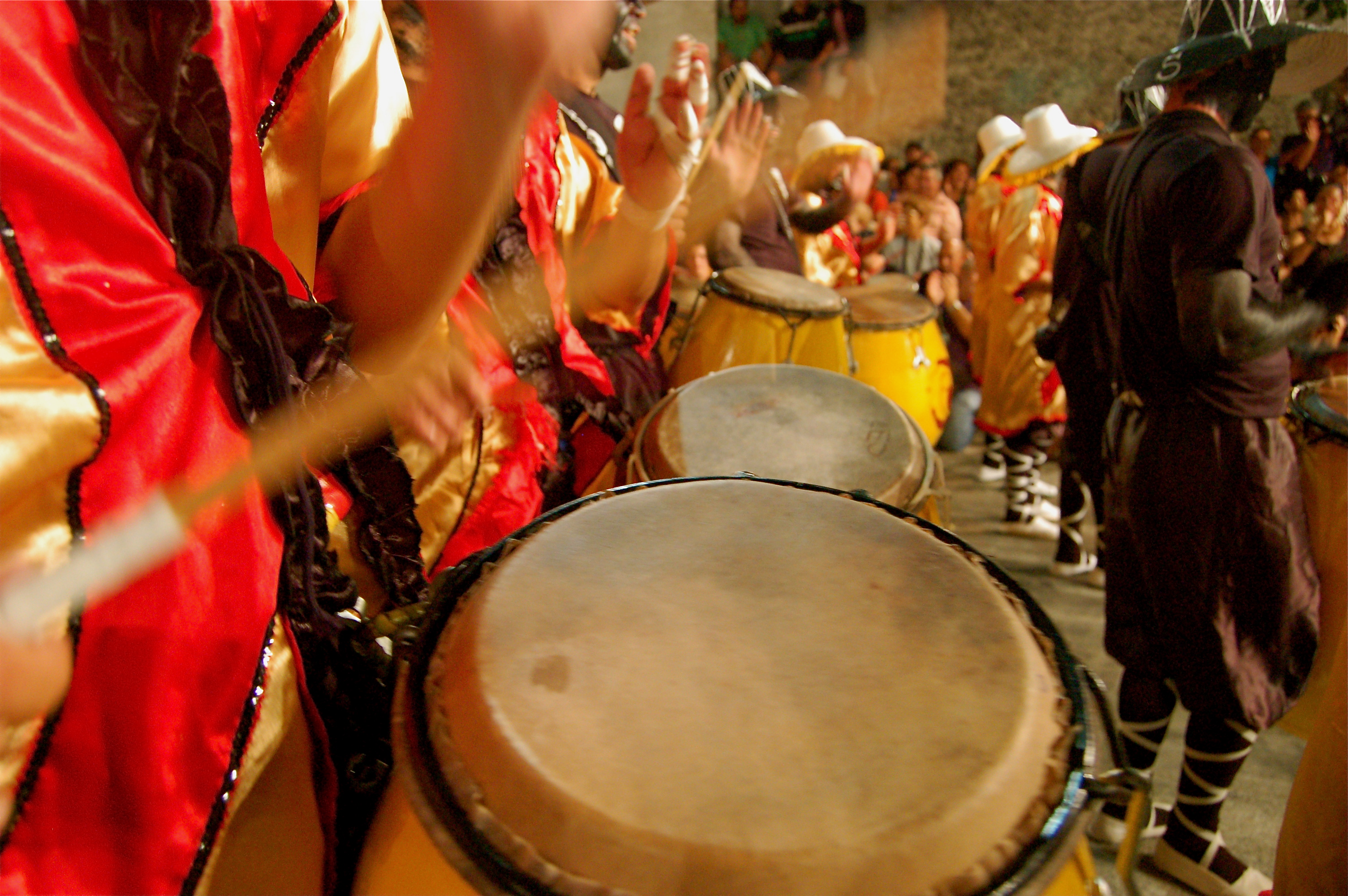
Candombe drums

== History ==
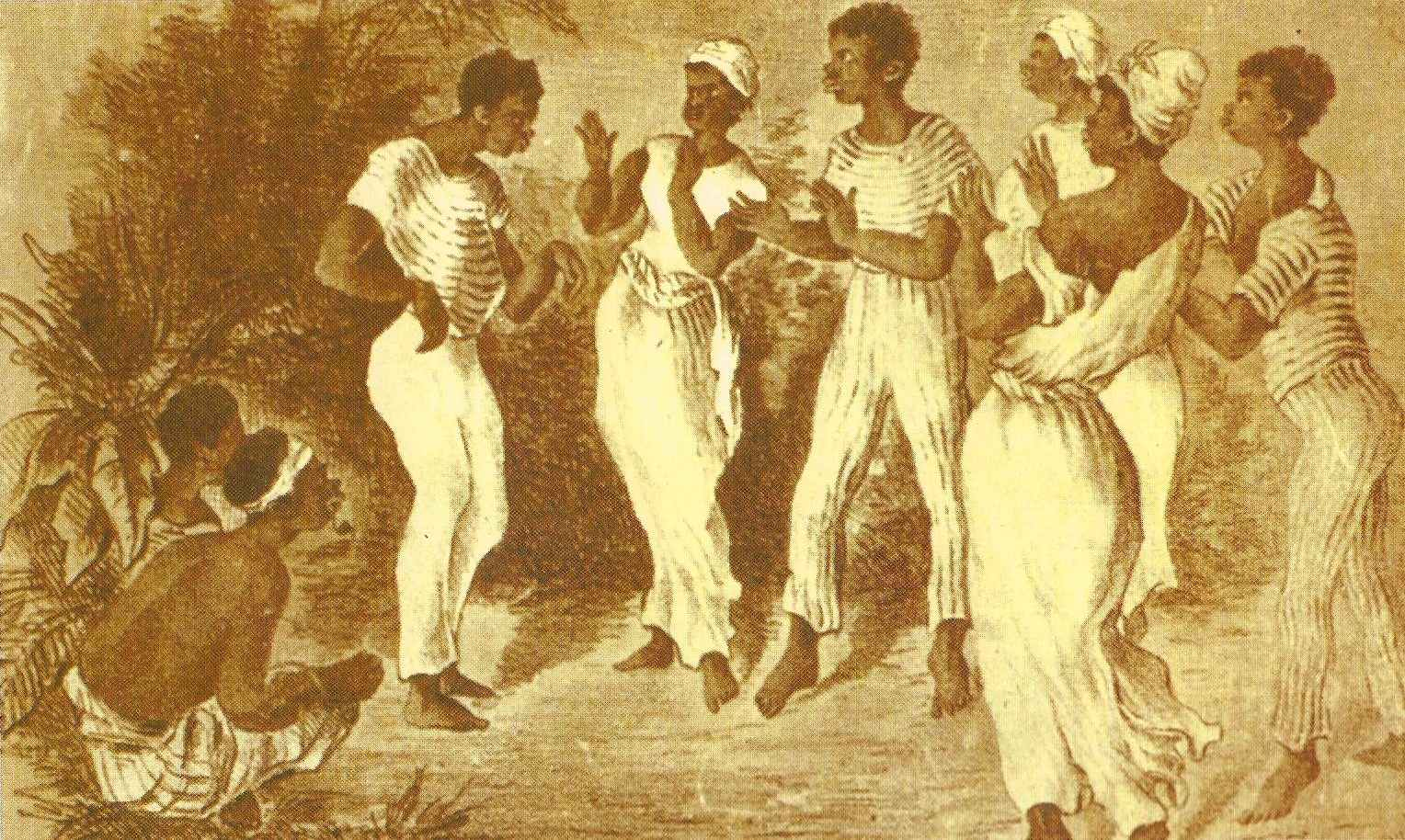
Afro-Uruguayans gathering for a Candombe celebration, c. 1870

The Uruguayan Carnival finds its roots in the colonial period of Uruguayan culture, where the days of Carnival, Christmas, and New Year were celebrated by Montevideans in brightly-coloured robes with song and dance outside city walls. As the event attracted more attention, European carnival traditions began to influence the Carnival celebrations, especially through objects and traditions such as bran and flour shed, shed water syringes, throwing eggs, oranges, apples, or other objects.

This cultural expression is rooted in the carnivalesque theatre which emprises both religious and civic rituals. In the mid-18th century, Afro-uruguayan enslaved people had one day off to celebrate their own culture and traditions to the rhythm of the drums of Candombe music. In fact, the term "Las Llamadas" (The Calls), which is a traditional carnival dance parade in Montevideo, comes from the call made by the Afro-uruguayan slaves when they wanted to get together in the streets by playing the drums.

In the 20th century, Martha Gularte became one of the pioneering female vedettes of Uruguayan Carnival. A candombe dancer and choreographer, she became a prominent figure in the carnival tradition and Afro-Uruguayan culture.

== Festivities and music ==
The several festivities of the Carnival include theatrical-musical performances, street music and parades. Amongst these is Murga, a theatrical-musical genre that consists of a chorus of 14 to 17 people with murga drums. The themes of this musical theatre usually satirically portray the politics and society of Uruguay. Here, performers have their faces painted and are usually dressed in bright outfits. Lyrical content is based on a particular theme, chosen by the group, which serves to provide commentary on events in Uruguay or elsewhere over the preceding year.

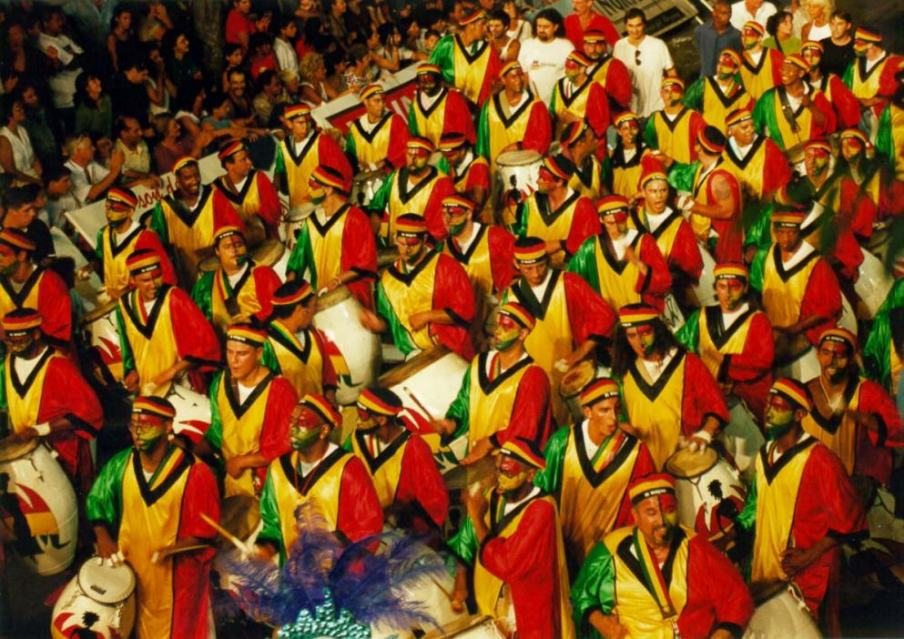
Comparsa at Llamadas parade in 1999

In addition, Escolas de Samba is also traditionally performed in the Carnival, principally in regions like Artigas and Montevideo. Utilising Brazilian percussion, dancers and a chorus of people, the performers sing the Samba Enredo.
