= Music of Uruguay =

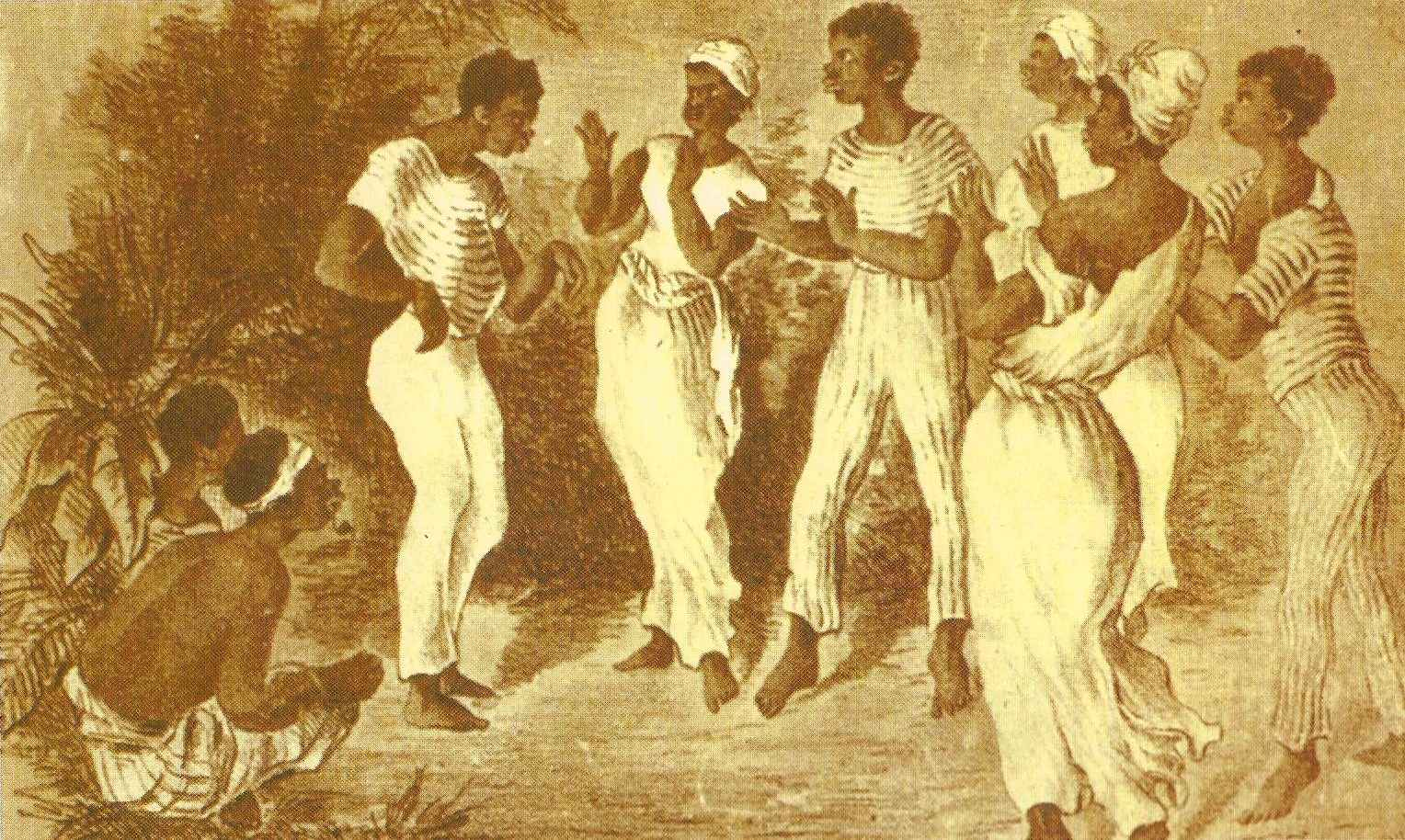
Candombe1870-Uruguay.

The most distinctive music of Uruguay is to be found in the tango and candombe; both genres have been recognized by UNESCO as an Intangible Cultural Heritage of Humanity. Uruguayan music includes a number of local musical forms such as murga, a form of musical theatre, and milonga, a folk guitar and song form deriving from Spanish and italian traditions and related to similar forms found in many American countries.

== Folk music ==
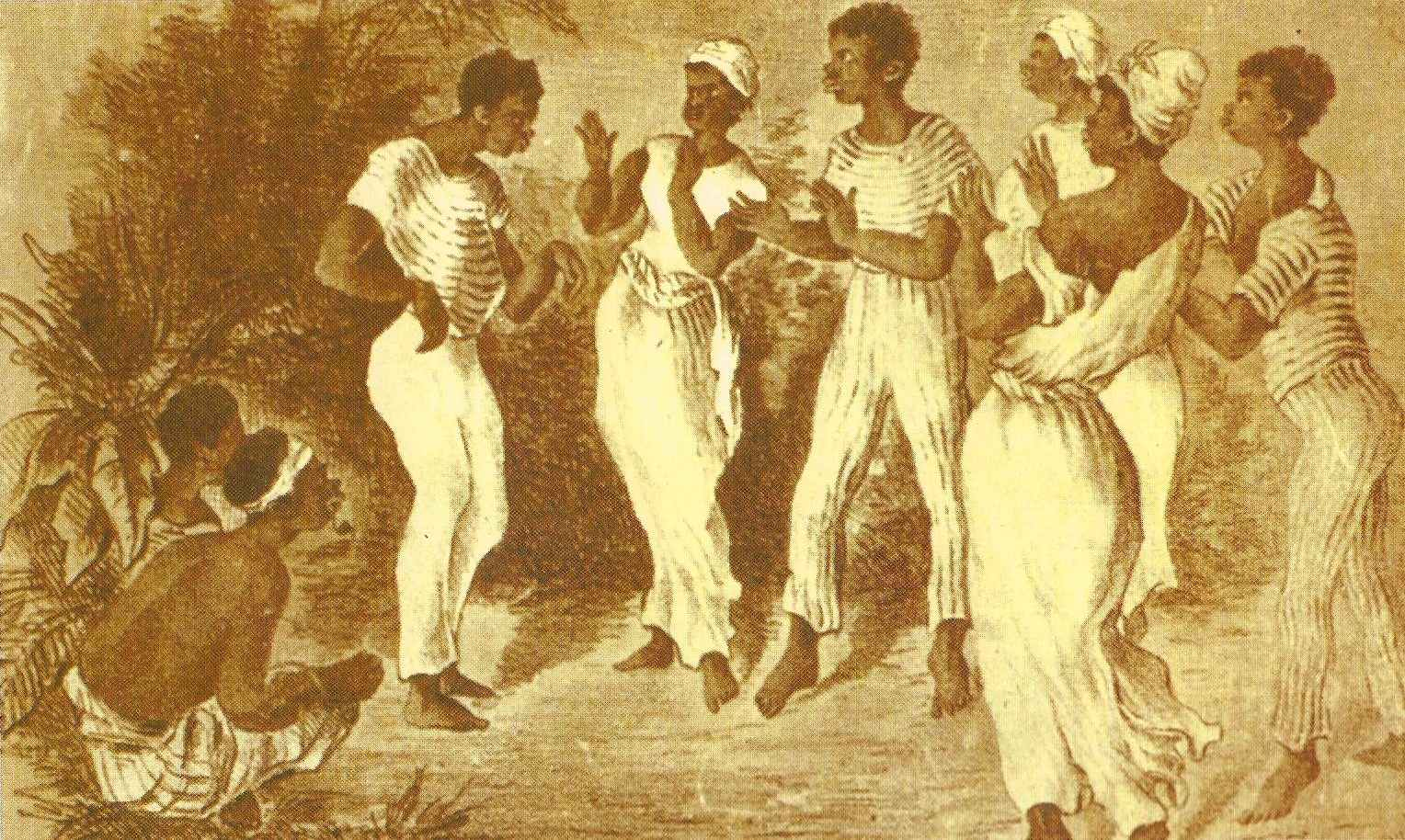
Music of Uruguay

Charrúa people used wooden drums, hornpipes, flutes, seashells to play music. Other folk musical instruments are marimba and musical bow.

Since colonial times, Uruguay has had its own folk music. Among the most notable countryside musicians are Bartolomé Hidalgo, Santiago Chalar, Osiris Rodríguez Castillos, Tabaré Etcheverry, Juan José de Mello, Cacho Labandera, Anselmo Grau, Amalia de la Vega, Marcos Velásquez, Los Cantaclaro, Abel Soria, Julio Gallego, Teresita Minetti, Oscar Ramírez, Luis Arrúa, Carlos Malo, among others.

=== Uruguayan tango ===
Tango has been recognized by UNESCO as Intangible Cultural Heritage of Humanity. The modern field of tango music and dance arose in Buenos Aires, Argentina as well as Montevideo. Carlos Gardel, the great tango singer, was born in France and raised in Buenos Aires, but in 1920 after becoming famous he registered his birthplace as being in Tacuarembó, Uruguay, probably to avoid problems with French authorities during an upcoming tour of France. Other Uruguayan tango musicians, among the most important names, were director Francisco Canaro and his violinist Modesto Ocampo. Also the singer Julio Sosa. One of the best-known tangos in the world, "La Cumparsita", was written by Uruguayan composer Gerardo Matos Rodríguez. Modern tango includes the late poet Horacio Ferrer, who contributed lyrics to several of the most important tango works by Argentinian composer Astor Piazzolla; celebrated singer-songwriter Malena Muyala and Valeria Lima. As did Piazzolla, Uruguayan composer Miguel del Aguila has also elevated tango to the classical music level in chamber and orchestral works like Concierto en Tango (Grammy nominated 2015), Tango Trio, Salon Buenos Aires (Grammy nominated 2010), Disagree! and many other works. The Uruguayan-Argentinian band Bajofondo is a multi-award winning project which aims to create a more contemporary version of tango and other musical styles of the Río de la Plata region. Juan Campodónico's Campo consists of a mix of musical styles, including tango, which released album was nominated for a MTV Europe Music Awards, the Grammys, and Latin Grammys.

=== Candombe ===
Candombe has recognized by UNESCO as Intangible Cultural Heritage of Humanity. Candombe originates from the Río de la Plata, where African slaves brought their dances and percussion music. The word tango then referred to the traditional drums and dances, as well as the places where dancing occurred. Candombe rhythms are produced by drum ensembles, known as cuerdas, which include dozens of drummers and feature three drum sizes: tambor repique, tambor chico and tambor piano, known as tambores de candombe.

Popular candombe musicians include Hugo Fattoruso and Rubén Rada. Fattoruso has been a longtime part of both the Uruguayan and Latin American music scene, including as a member of rock band Los Shakers, and swing band The Hot Blowers, as well as Brazilian Milton Nascimento and the Latin jazz and Acid Jazz group Opa. It was in the 1970s the most important Latin band in the United States according to the magazine Down Beat.

The Afro-Uruguayan rhythm Candombe has played a significant role in Uruguayan culture for over 200 years. The rhythm is created by the use of three drums (tambores); tambor piano, tambor chico and tambor repique. The piano is the largest in size and the lowest in pitch of the three tambores. The rhythmic base of Candombe, its function similar to that of the upright or electric bass. The chico (literally "small") is the smallest in size and highest in pitch of the three tambores, serving as the rhythmic pendulum. The tambor repique (ricochet) embellishes Candombe's rhythm with improvised phrases. Each of the three tambores is played with an open hand (mano) and a stick (palo) in the other. At a minimum, one of each of the three tambores must be present.

The purest form of Candombe takes place each Sunday night on the streets of Montevideo, where many drummers assemble, playing their drums under the moonlit sky. Isla de Flores is the main street that joins Cuareim and Ansina, Candombe's two main social groups. For over a century spontaneous cuerdas have paraded on this street, and continue to do so today (Isla de Flores is also known by its other name, Carlos Gardel). As the cuerda slowly makes its way through the narrow streets of Montevideo, this contagious rhythm takes with it all in its path, surrounded on all sides by the neighborhood people moving their bodies to the rhythm of Candombe. At intervals the cuerda will pause, and by setting a fire, will heat their drums' skins for tuning purposes.

=== Milonga ===
The milonga was an Argentine/Uruguayan style of song that was popular in the 1870s. The milonga was derived from an earlier style of singing known as the 'payada de contrapunto'.

The song was set to a lively 2/4 tempo, and often included musical improvisation. Over time, dance steps and other musical influences were added, eventually giving rise to the tango. Milonga music is still used for dancing, but the milonga dancing of today is derivative of tango.

=== Murga ===
Murga is a kind of Montevidean musical theatre for Carnival celebrations. A traditional murga group comprises a chorus and three percussionists and this is the type of murga performed on stages at Carnival. The singers perform in harmony using up to five vocal parts. Vocal production tends to be nasal and loud with little variation in volume. The percussion instruments, derived from the European military band, are the bombo (a shallow bass drum worn at the waist and played horizontally), redoblante (snare drum) and platillos (cymbals). The two most important pieces of the performance are the opening song (saludo) and the exit song (retirada or despedida).

== Popular music ==
=== Canto popular ===
Canto popular (popular song), which arose around 1975, eschewed contemporary instrumentation, including electric instruments, allowing only native styles and rhythms. This can be compared to Spanish-language singer-songwriter developments like nueva canción, nueva trova and tropicalismo. Daniel Viglietti was by far the most important Uruguayan exponent of canto popular; his song "A Desalambrar" became an international popular classic. Canto popular peaked in about 1977.

Uruguayan artists involved in canto popular include Alfredo Zitarrosa, El Sabalero and Los Olimareños.

=== Candombe beat ===
Candombe beat began in the late 1960s with El Kinto, a band featuring Ruben Rada and Eduardo Mateo. Emerging at the same time as Los Shakers they forged their own identity with very little Western influence. The beat of candombe formed the rhythm, bossa nova played a large role in its chords and structure, as did traditional Uruguayan folk music. Mateo and Rada would both go on to have successful solo careers, and the music's influence would play a large role in Popular Music and Uruguayan rock. Totem was the most important group of Candombe Beat in the early 1970s. One of the later exponents of candombe beat was Jaime Roos whose popularity in Uruguay began in the 1970s and has continued through to the 21st century.

=== Cumbia ===
By mid-2015, the Uruguayan bands Rombai and Márama of the emerging subgenre cumbia pop enjoyed great success all over Latin America even before publishing their first albums; particularly in their home country and in Argentina, where in a given moment they had together nine songs at the Spotify Top Ten ranking. Other Uruguayan bands of success are: Toco Para Vos, VI-EM, Toco Para Bailar and Golden Rocket.

=== Uruguayan rock ===
Rock and roll first broke into Uruguayan audiences with the arrival of British band The Beatles in the early 1960s. A wave of bands appeared in Montevideo, including Los Shakers, Los Mockers, Los Iracundos and Los Malditos, who became major figures in the so-called Uruguayan Invasion of Argentina. With the coming of the military dictatorship in 1973, the Uruguayan rock scene effectively died; since the mid-1980s it has resurged. Since the beginning of the 2000s Uruguayan rock has achieved a great popularity. Popular bands like La Vela Puerca, No Te Va Gustar, El Cuarteto de Nos, La Trampa or Buitres have a massive following in the Southern Cone. Annual festivals throughout the country like Pilsen Rock in Durazno, Semana de Lavalleja and Minas & Abril in Minas, or Semana de la Cerveza in Paysandú, peaked more than 100,000 people several years with some of those groups as closing guests. Other important bands are Trotsky Vengaran, Hereford, Once Tiros, Bufón, La Triple Nelson and La Tabaré. Indie and alternative artists include Juan Wauters and The Islingtons.

== Classical music ==
The modern conductors Gisele Ben-Dor and Carlos Kalmar are renowned in their field. Abel Carlevaro, a classical guitar virtuoso performer is worldwide known for having established a new school of instrumental technique. Among the best-known composers of Uruguay we find Eduardo Fabini, Miguel del Aguila, Luis Cluzeau Mortet and Hector Tosar.

There are several classical orchestras performing countrywide. The SODRE (acronym for "Official Service for broadcasting Radio, TV, and Performing Arts") is the main institution generating cultural activities for the whole country. Created in 1929, it manages a symphonic orchestra, a chamber music and ballet ensembles, a choir, among others. Among its past artistic directors, was the Uruguayan classical composer, Pedro Ipuche Riva. Montevideo's City Hall has several orchestras performing classical as well as popular music, like the Orquesta Filarmónica de Montevideo.

== Other genres ==
The Oscar-winning singer-songwriter Jorge Drexler has a prolific career, mostly on the Latin rock genre. Luciano Supervielle has collaborated with him, as well as with Juan Campodónico and is a member of Bajofondo.

Since 1997 La Teja Pride (stylized as latejapride* or ltp*) is an alternative hip hop band/collective from Montevideo. In the 1990s El Peyote Asesino was also a prominent hip-hop band, and Plátano Macho also ventured into rap.

Goodfellas also known as 'Buenos Muchachos' is an alternative rock band from Montevideo.

Latin rock band Abuela Coca alongside Chala Madre are the most representative reggae bands; both also mix ska and rock.

Santé Les Amis is a six-member project, born in 2007 in Montevideo, leading the electronic, disco punk and rock pop music in the country.

Fede Graña & Los Prolijos developed polka, folk rock and funk.

Reytoro is a thrash and heavy metal band. Meanwhile, the metal band Cuchilla Grande defines its style as "metal criollo".

The singer-songwriter Pablo Sciuto has a long history and prolific career, working together with important artists in the world.
