= Santiago Chalar =

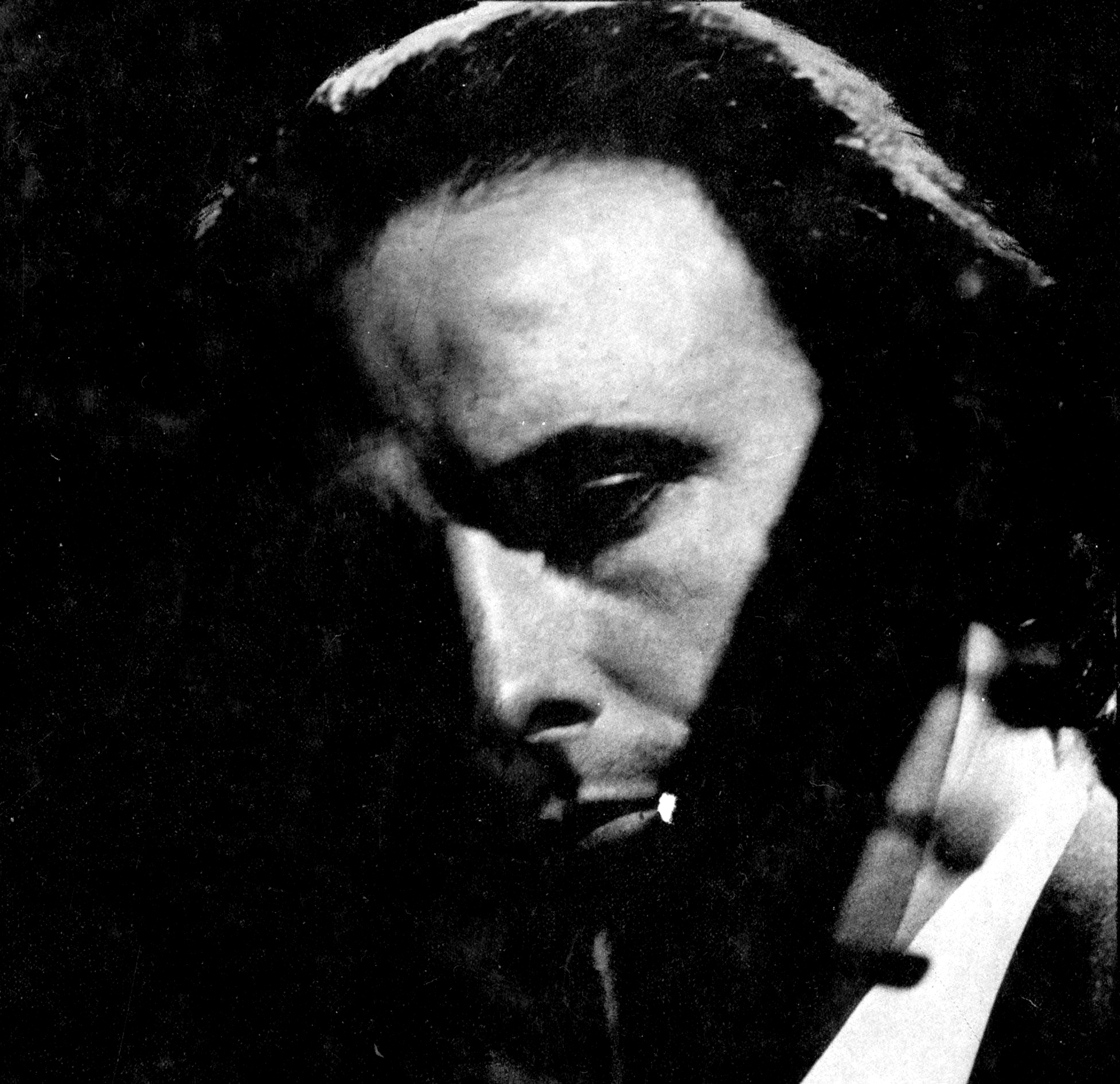
- Santiago Chalar

Background information
- Born: Carlos Alfredo Paravís Salaverry; September 25, 1938; Montevideo, Uruguay
- Died: November 21, 1994 (aged 56) Montevideo, Uruguay
- Genre: Folk / Milonga / Serranera / Valsesito criollo
- Occupations: Musician, songwriter, poet and physician
- Instruments: Guitar, vocals, piano
- Formerly of: Osiris Rodríguez Castillos, Atahualpa Yupanqui, Aníbal Sampayo, Rubén Lena

Carlos Alfredo Paravís Salaverry, known as Santiago Chalar (September 25, 1938 – November 21, 1994), was a Uruguayan physician traumatologist, poet, songwriter, musician, guitarist and singer. He studied music and medicine. He used an alias Santiago to pay homage to a friend of his who died in a plane accident and Chalar was one of his ancestor's last name. In his artistic career he achieved recognition and fame. He obtained some music awards. He is considered one of the best Uruguayan folk music songwriters and singers.

== Biography ==
Chalar was born on September 25, 1938 in Montevideo, Uruguay. He married Adela Martínez Graña, and they had 4 children: Adela, Carlos, Santiago, and Isabel.

In 1974, he moved to Minas to be the public hospital director. He created a traditional music festival in Minas called Minas y Abril to raise funds to the public hospital, which is nowadays one of the most popular folk music festival in Uruguay.

Chalar died of cancer on November 21, 1994, in Montevideo.

== Artistic career ==
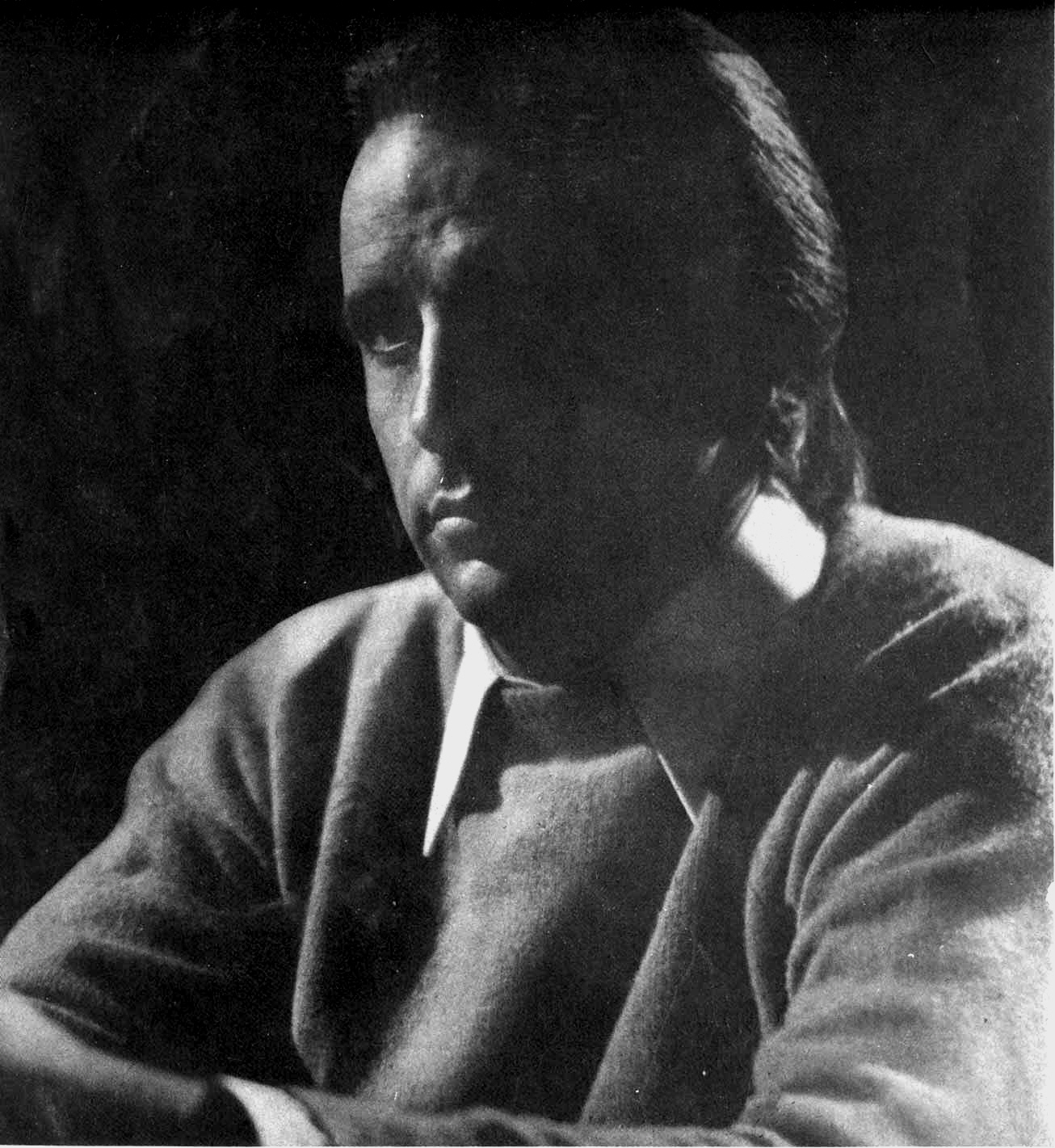
Santiago Chalar in 1973

Chalar was a folk music singer in Uruguay. He especially played and sang Milonga, Serranera, media Serranera, Valsesito criollo. The lyrics of the songs he wrote had to do with the everyday country man and everyday life.

At the age of 9, he started taking guitar lessons with professor Gregorio Rodríguez in Fernando Sor Institute in Montevideo.

When he was 15, he started to love country life and folk music. He started to compose his own songs with some Southern Brazilian music influence. He was later influenced by Atahualpa Yupanqui.

At the age of 17, he had his first gig, singing folk music songs and playing the guitar and the piano. He played in Bahia, Brazil in 1984, together with Hugo Marmolejo and Omar Sanz (keyboards). In 1958, he met Osiris Rodríguez Castillos.

In 1961 he recorded his first album, with the single "Gurí pescador". He took part in music festivals in Uruguay and Argentina, and he represented Uruguay in the World Folk Festival in Mexico in 1968.

In 1974, Jorge Cafrune invited him to the Cosquín Festival in Argentina. From 1978 on, he worked with Santos Inzaurralde, Wenceslao Varela, Lucio Muniz and Rubén Lena. He took part in many music festivals in Brazil, Argentina, Paraguay, Ecuador, Mexico, the United States and Spain.

In 1980, Omar Sanz talked Charlar into including a keyboard and join a music group with Hugo Marmolejo.

Chalar's most famous single is "Minas y Abril".

He composed several popular Uruguayan folk music songs such as:

- Pida patrón -with Wenceslao Varela (1993)
- El Pedido -with Wenceslao Varela (1993)
- La del Templao (1993)*this is incorrect, Del Templao was written by Rubén Lena
- Atadito -with Santos Inzaurralde (1996)
- Calagualero (Album Minas y Abril)

In his 30 years of artistic career, he recorded 20 records.
