= Yamandú Palacios =

Uruguayan composer, guitarist and singer (1940–2021)

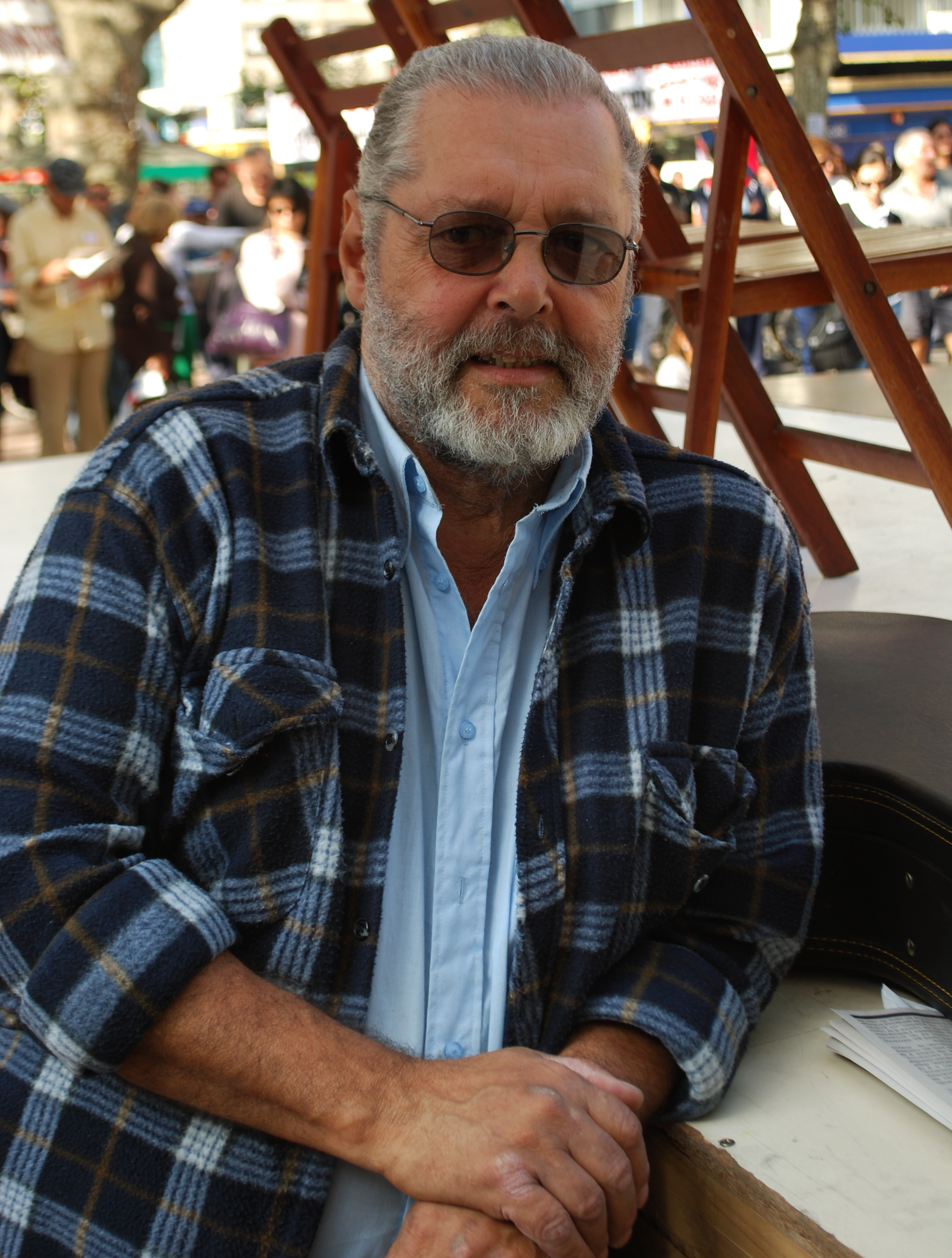

Background information
- Born: Yamandú Palacios Pintos; 28 April 1940; Montevideo, Uruguay
- Died: 6 January 2021 (aged 80)
- Occupations: Composer; guitarist; singer
- Instruments: Vocals; guitar

Yamandú Palacios Pintos (28 April 1940 – 6 January 2021) was a Uruguayan composer, guitarist, and singer of popular music.

== Life and career ==
Born in Montevideo, Palacios completed secondary school in 1955 and then began studying music and guitar with Professor Callejas. Two years later he entered the National School of Fine Arts in Montevideo to study painting and drawing. Between 1958 and 1961 he performed with vocal groups and a folk dance ensemble.

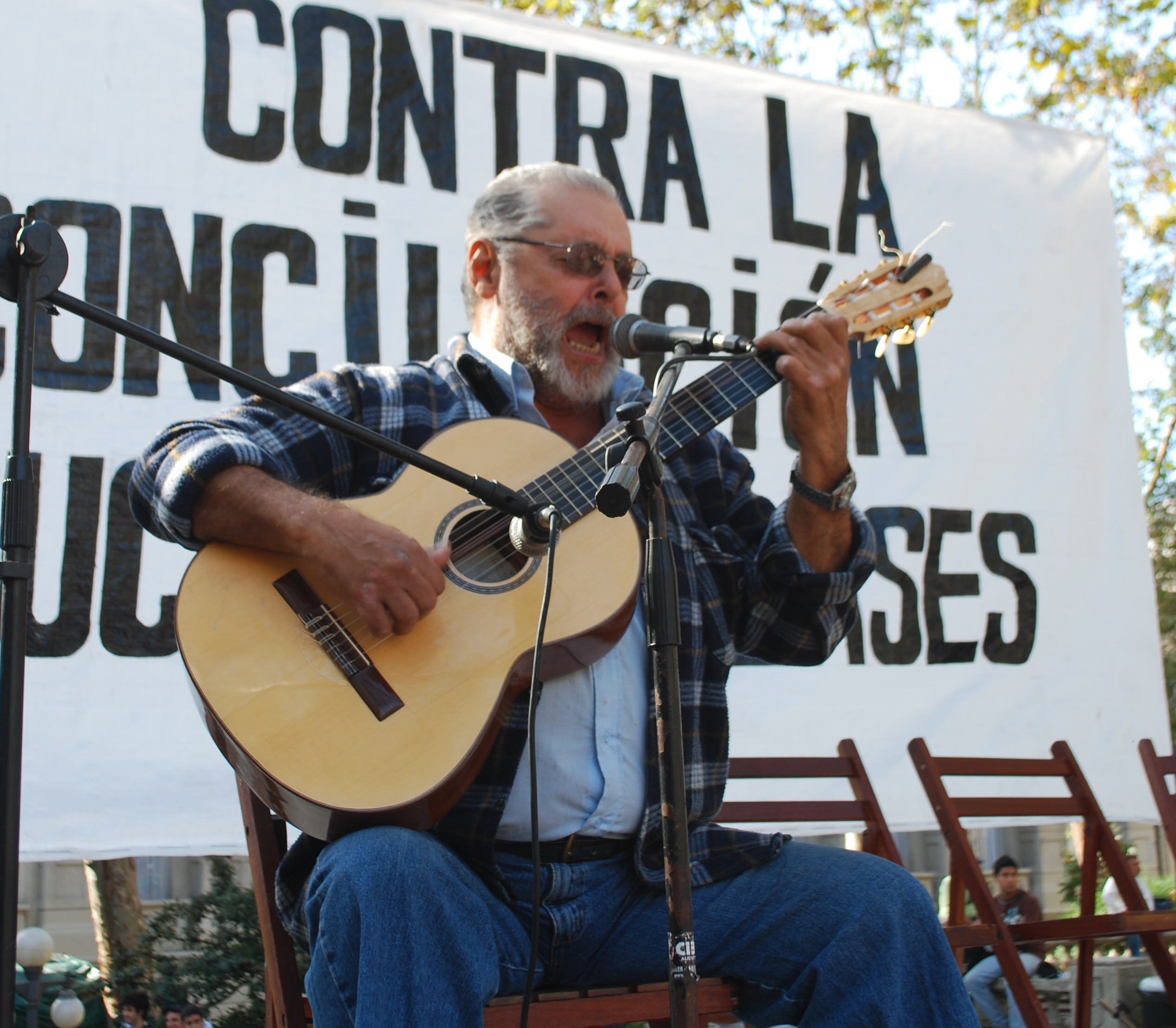
Palacios playing the guitar

In 1975 he settled in Rome, where he gave numerous concerts and performances both in that city and in other Italian localities, including Genoa, Milan, Naples, Turin, Vicenza, Verona, Cagliari, Florence, Urbino, and Venice. He also performed on several occasions with Inti-Illimani, notably at the inauguration of the Circo Culturale e Popolare founded by actors Gigi Proietti and Vittorio Gassman.

He later appeared at the Fête de l'Humanité in Paris and gave three recitals in Zürich at the invitation of that city's council. During this period he also took part in festivals in Lugano, Geneva, Berlin, and Sokolov, and appeared several times on European television.

In 1997 he settled in Spain, where he continued touring and performing in many cities. Over the course of his career he shared stages with artists such as Joaquín Sabina, Joan Manuel Serrat, Víctor Manuel, Luis Eduardo Aute, Mercedes Sosa, Manuel Picón, Alfredo Zitarrosa, Rafael Amor, Osiris Rodríguez Castillos, and poet Rafael Alberti, among others. He was a member of the Asociación de Escritores y Artistas del Orbe (AEADO). He was the father of rapper Pedro Peligro and the paternal grandfather of rapper Trueno. Palacios died on 6 January 2021, aged 80.

Yamandú is also the father of singer-songwriter, composer, actor, and puppeteer Pablo Palacios, born in Montevideo in 1964. Unlike his brother Pedro, Pablo pursued a musical path within the trova genre, the Río de la Plata singer-songwriter tradition, and music for his theatrical productions. He primarily performs his own songs, though he has occasionally included the iconic track "Poeta al sur" in his live repertoire.

== Discography ==
His discography included the following releases:

- Basta Ya (Macondo, Montevideo, 1967)
- Canta Yamandú Palacios (Macondo, Montevideo, 1969)
- Poeta al Sur (Orfeo, Montevideo, 1973)
- Poeta al Sur (Odeon, Buenos Aires, 1973)
- Canción de Nuestro Tiempo (Zodiaco, Rome, released simultaneously in Italy, Australia, France, Sweden, and Ecuador, 1975)
- Yamandú Palacios (Movieplay, Madrid, 1977)
- Desde el Exilio (Dicap, Rome, released simultaneously in Australia, France, Sweden, England, and Ecuador, 1977)
- Nuestra Luz (La Batuta, Montevideo, shared cassette album with Tabaré Arapí, 1985)
- Yo no canto el desencanto (Estudios Orión, Montevideo, 2007)
- Guitarras hermanas (double album with his brother Leonardo Palacios, Estudios Orión, Montevideo, 2011)
