= José Carbajal (Uruguayan musician) =

Uruguayan musical artist (1943–2010)

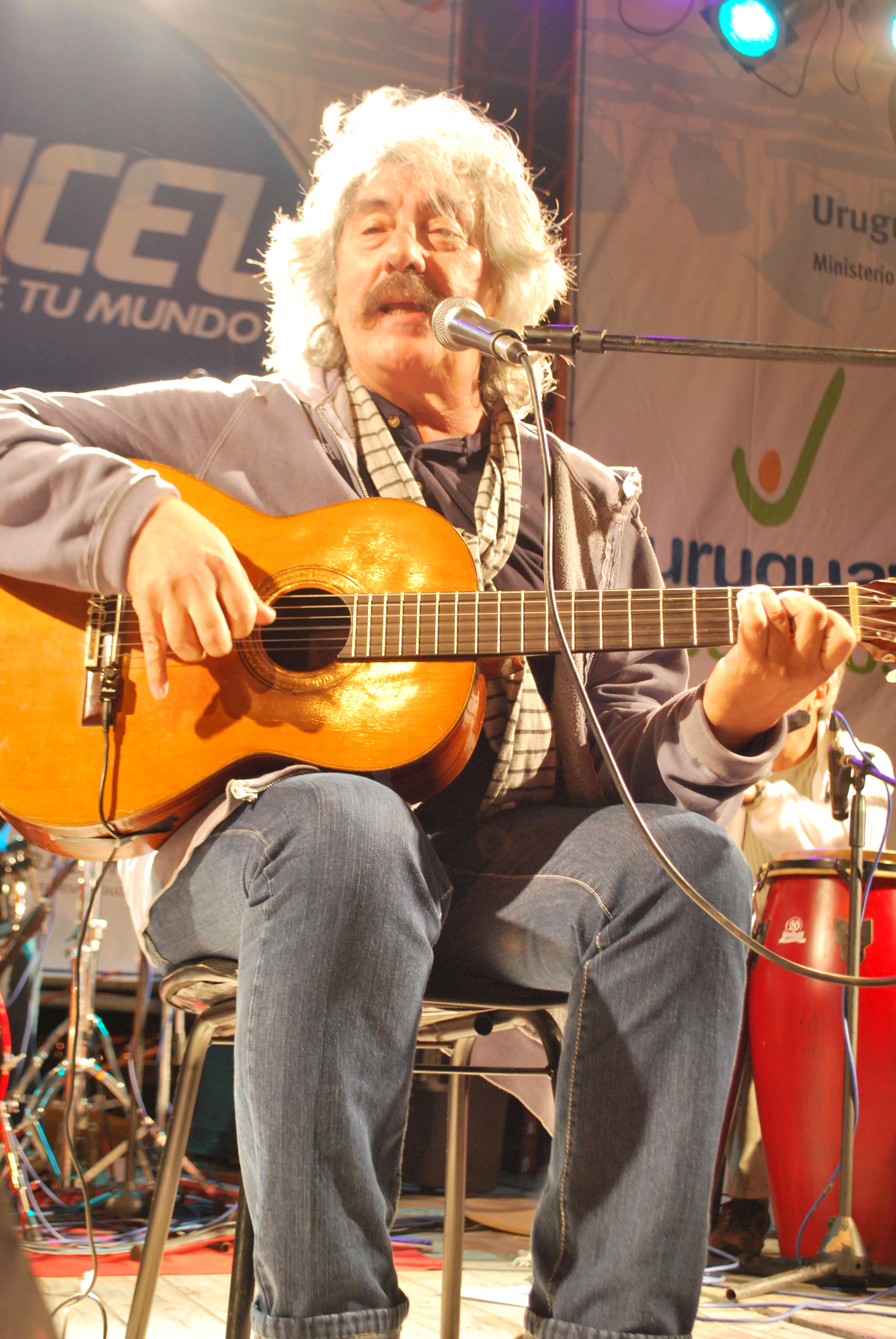
- José Carbajal in February 2010

Background information
- Also known as: El Sabalero
- Born: December 8, 1943
- Origin: Uruguay
- Died: October 21, 2010 (aged 66)
- Genres: Popular music
- Occupation: Singer
- Instrument: Guitar

José María Carbajal Pruzzo (December 8, 1943 – October 21, 2010), known as El Sabalero, was an Uruguayan singer, composer and guitarist.

== Biography ==
=== Childhood ===
Carbajal was born on December 8, 1943 in Juan Lacaze. He completed his primary education at the Don Bosco Industrial School in Puerto Sauce and attended high school for a single year at the public lyceum. He dropped out after starting to work in a textile factory. But he completed his studies later, at a public night school.

=== Artistic beginnings ===
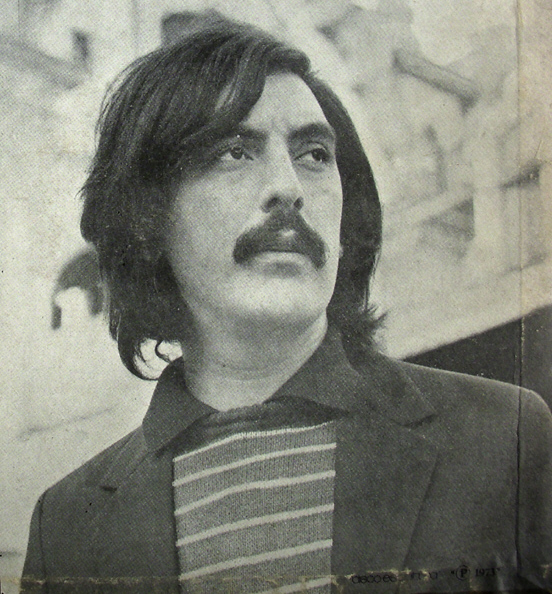
El Sabalero on 1973.

In 1967 he migrated to Montevideo and started to act in folk clubs, singing his own compositions. The same year, he released his first recording, for the Orfeo label, which featured fellow guitarist Roberto Cabrera.

This record made up of four chamarritas went virtually unnoticed, and two years later he recorded his first LP album, Canto Popular.

With a foreword by poet Idea Vilariño, and instrumental support by Yamandú Palacios and Roberto Cabrera, this record was a remarkable success in Uruguay and Latin America. The record features some of his most famous songs, such as "Chiquillada", "La sencillita" y "A mi gente".

=== Exile ===
Between 1970 and 1973 he lived in Buenos Aires, leaving in exile at the onset of the Uruguayan dictatorship due to his communist ideals. He travelled to Mexico, France and Spain, eventually settling in the Netherlands with his Dutch wife Anke van Haastrecht.

=== Later years and death ===
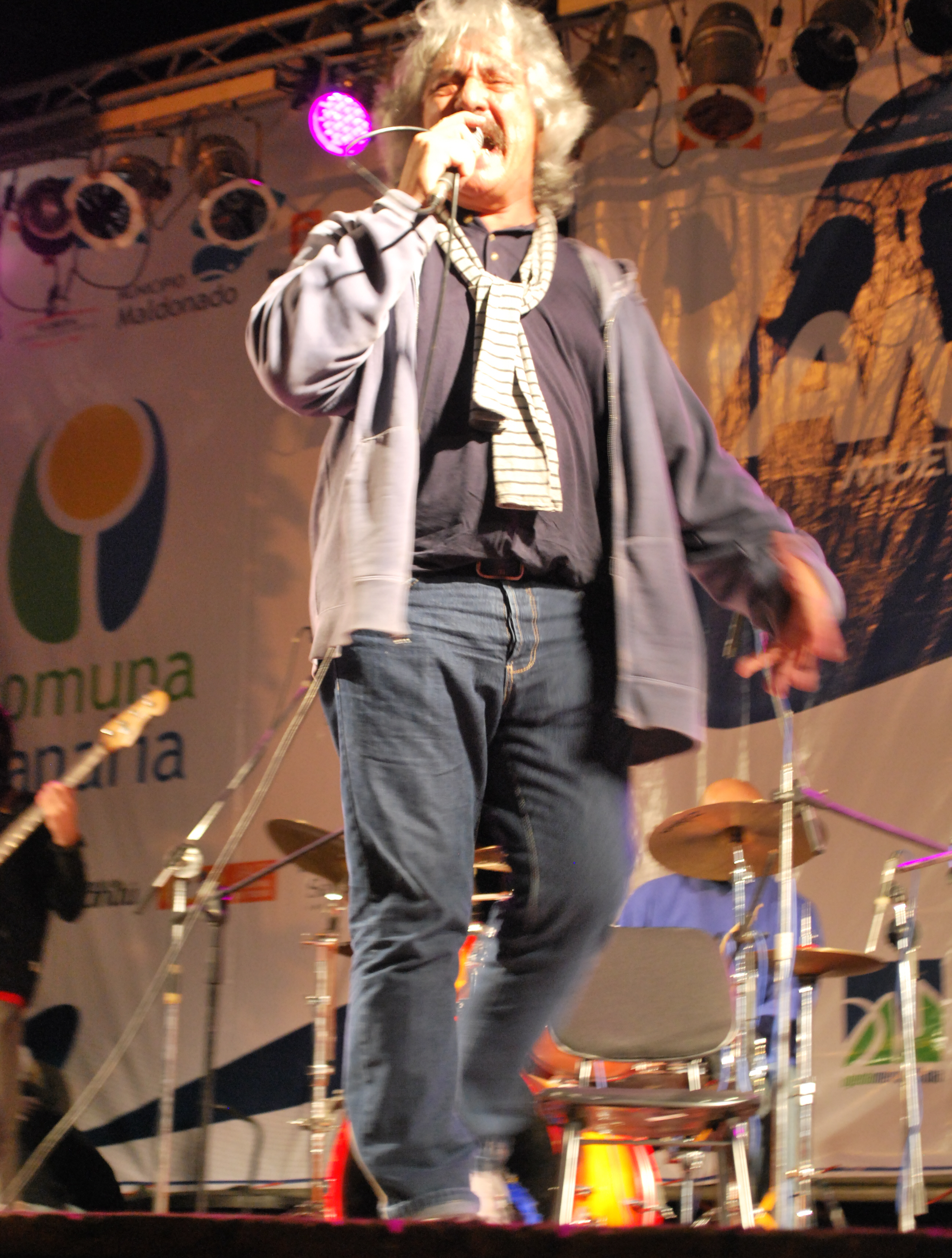
El Sabalero providing a concert in 2010.

He returned to Uruguay in 1984, going back to the Netherlands in 1992, albeit keeping a band in Montevideo.

On October 21, 2010, he died in his house of Villa Argentina of a cardiac arrest. His remains were incinerated. A public celebration was held in his honor at the national velodrome.

== Discography ==
=== Long Plays ===
- Canto popular (Orfeo ULP 90518. 1969)
- Bien de pueblo (Orfeo ULP 90536. 1969)
- Canto popular (Ed. Argentina with different songs of the one of 1969. Odeón LDB-198. 1970)
- Chiquillada (Emi. Argentina. 1970)
- Octubre (Orfeo ULP 90545. 1970)
- Abre tu puerta vecino y saca al camino tu vino y tu pan (CBS Columbia 9120. Argentina. 1972)
- Pelusa (Microfón I-401. Argentina. 1973)
- Volveremos (KKLA. Netherlands. 1975)
- Colmeneras (KKLA. Netherlands. 1978)
- La flota (Sondor 44318. 1983)
- La muerte (Orfeo SULP 90743. 1984)
- Angelitos (Orfeo SCO 90767. 1984)
- Angelitos vol. II (Orfeo SULP 90768. 1985)
- Entre putas y ladrones (letras de Higinio Mena. Orfeo 91070–4. 1990)
- Viento en popa (Orfeo 91209–4. 1993)
- La casa encantada (Orfeo CDO 053–2. 1995)
- Cuentamusa (Orfeo CDO 097–2. 1995)
- Noche de rondas (Bizarro Records 2334–2. 2000)
- Re-percusión / el 14 (Obligado Records RL 2626–2. 2002)
- Me vuela el corazón (Obligado Records RL 2858–2. 2003)
- La viuda (lyrics by Higinio Mena. Aperiá Records. 2006)

=== EP and singles ===
- Sabalero (Orfeo 333–3556. 1967)
- Navidad y rejas / No te vayas nunca, compañera (1972)
- ¿Dónde están? (shared with Los Olimareños. Barry's Record 0072. Netherlands. 1979)

=== Reissues and compilations ===
- Abre tu puerta vecino y saca al camino tu vino y tu pan (CBS Columbia 59.120. 1977)
- Chiquillada (Sondor 84207. 1981)
- Chiquillada (RCA. 1984)
- Lo mejor del Sabalero (Sondor. 1985)
- Antología (Orfeo. 1987)
- Grandes éxitos (Sondor 6.731-2. 1991)
- Entre putas y ladrones / El viejo (Orfeo CDO 014–2. 1992)
- Angelitos (contains volumes I and II of "Angelitos". Orfeo CDO 022–2)
- La flota (Sondor 4.318-2. 1998)
- El Sabalero y sus canciones (La República. Series Bigs of the Popular Singing Vol II 2494–2. 2001)
- Re-percusión / el 14 (edited in Argentina. 2004)
- Canto popular (Orfeo / Emi / Bizarro Records 7243 8 59538 2 8. 2004)
