= Juan José Morosoli =

Uruguayan writer

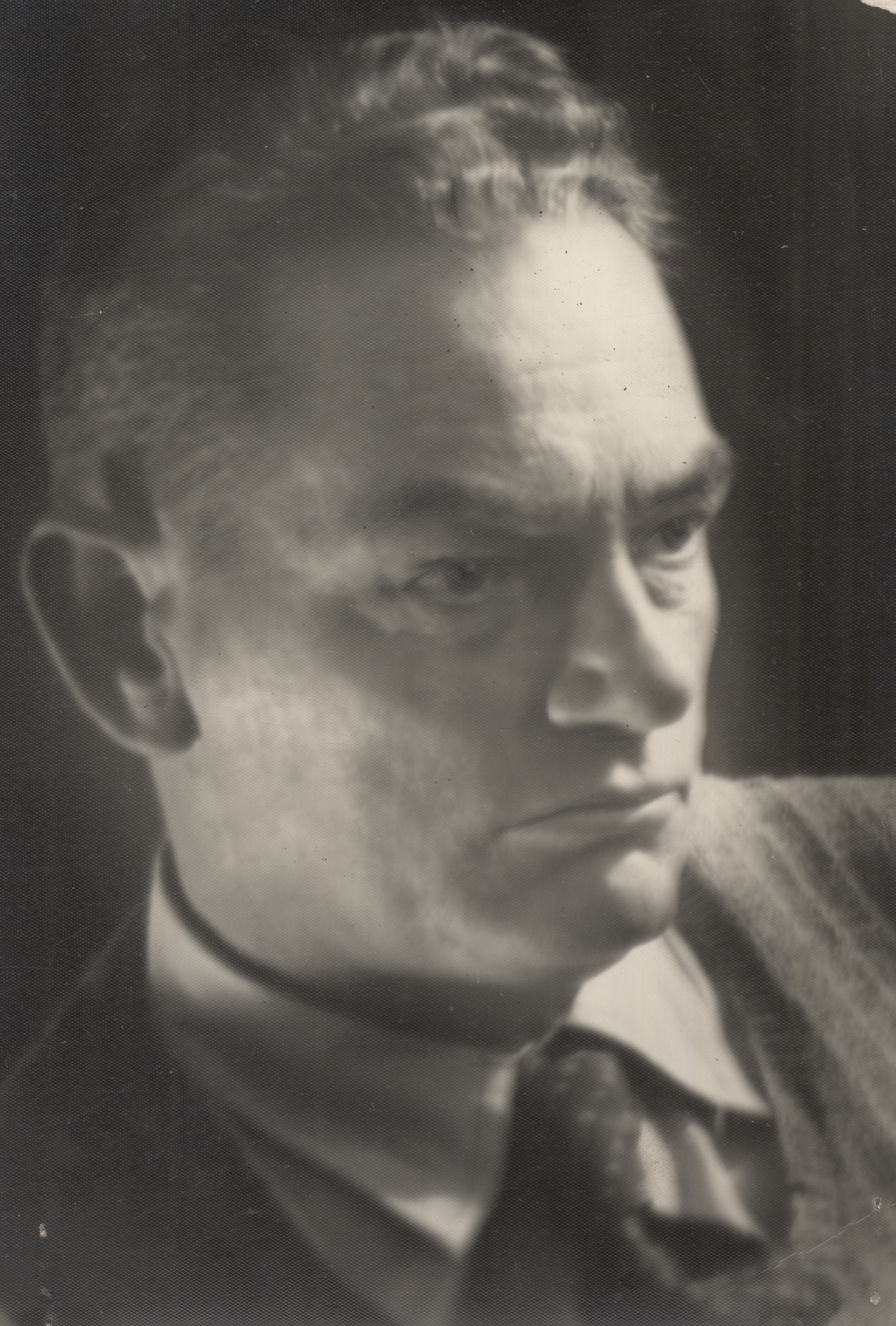
- Juan Jose Morosoli circa 1950
- Born: January 19, 1899; Minas, Lavalleja, Uruguay
- Died: December 29, 1957 (aged 58); Minas, Lavalleja, Uruguay

Juan José Morosoli (January 19, 1899 – December 29, 1957) was a Uruguayan writer. His masterpiece is Perico, a collection of short stories for children, which included "Arenero" and "La Querencia Olvidada" in 1947.

== Biography ==
Juan José Morosoli was born on January 19, 1899, in Minas, Lavalleja, Uruguay. His father was a Swiss immigrant who worked as a bricklayer. When he was a child he had to quit school on second grade due to economic problems his family were having. He was a self-made person. At the age of 9, he started working at a bookstore for his uncle, first as a courier and later as a shop assistant. In 1920, he opened a café with two partners in Montevideo, Uruguay.

In 1923, he wrote for many newspapers including La Unión from Minas, Marcha, Mundo Uruguayo and El Día from Montevideo. He also wrote some theatre plays between 1923 and 1928. In 1925 he wrote his first poems, now included in his book Balbuceos. In 1928 he edited a collective poetry work named Bajo la misma sombra together with Valeriano Magri, José María Cajaville and Casas Araújo, and his book Los Juegos.

As a writer, he specialized on short stories. He focused on everyday people who lived near the towns and he discovered their uniqueness and character traits full of elementary greatness or "grandeza elemental".

In 1932, he published his first book on short stories named Hombres, with a second edition in 1942. Some years later, he wrote some narrative books such as Los albañiles de "Los Tapes", Hombres y mujeres, Muchachos, Perico, and Vivientes, making him a famous short stories writer in Uruguay.

He died on December 29, 1959, in Minas, Lavalleja, Uruguay.

In 1959 "Tierra y tiempo" was published. In 1959, "Viaje hacia el mar" was published. Based on this story, the film Viaje hacia el mar was directed by Guillermo Casanova and starred Hugo Arana, Julio César Castro and Diego Delgrossi.

In 1991, some prizes were created by Lolita Rubial Foundation to pay homage to this writer in Minas, Lavalleja, Uruguay

Juan José Morosoli reading La Geografía, from his book Perico.

Juan José Morosoli reading La Industria, from his book Perico.

== Literary work ==
- Balbuceos (poems. 1925)
- Bajo la misma Sombra (poems, with Guillermo Cuadri, Valeriano Magri, José María Cajaraville and Julio Casas Araújo. 1928)
- Los juegos (poems. 1928)
- Hombres (short stories. 1932)
- Los albañiles de Los Tapes (short stories. 1936)
- Hombres (second edition, modified. 1943)
- Hombres y mujeres (short stories. 1944)
- Perico (short stories. 1947)
- Muchachos (short stories. 1950)
- Vivientes (short stories. 1953)
- Tierra y tiempo (1959)
- El viaje hacia el mar (Ediciones de la Banda Oriental. 1962)
