= Los Olimareños =

Uruguayan musical group

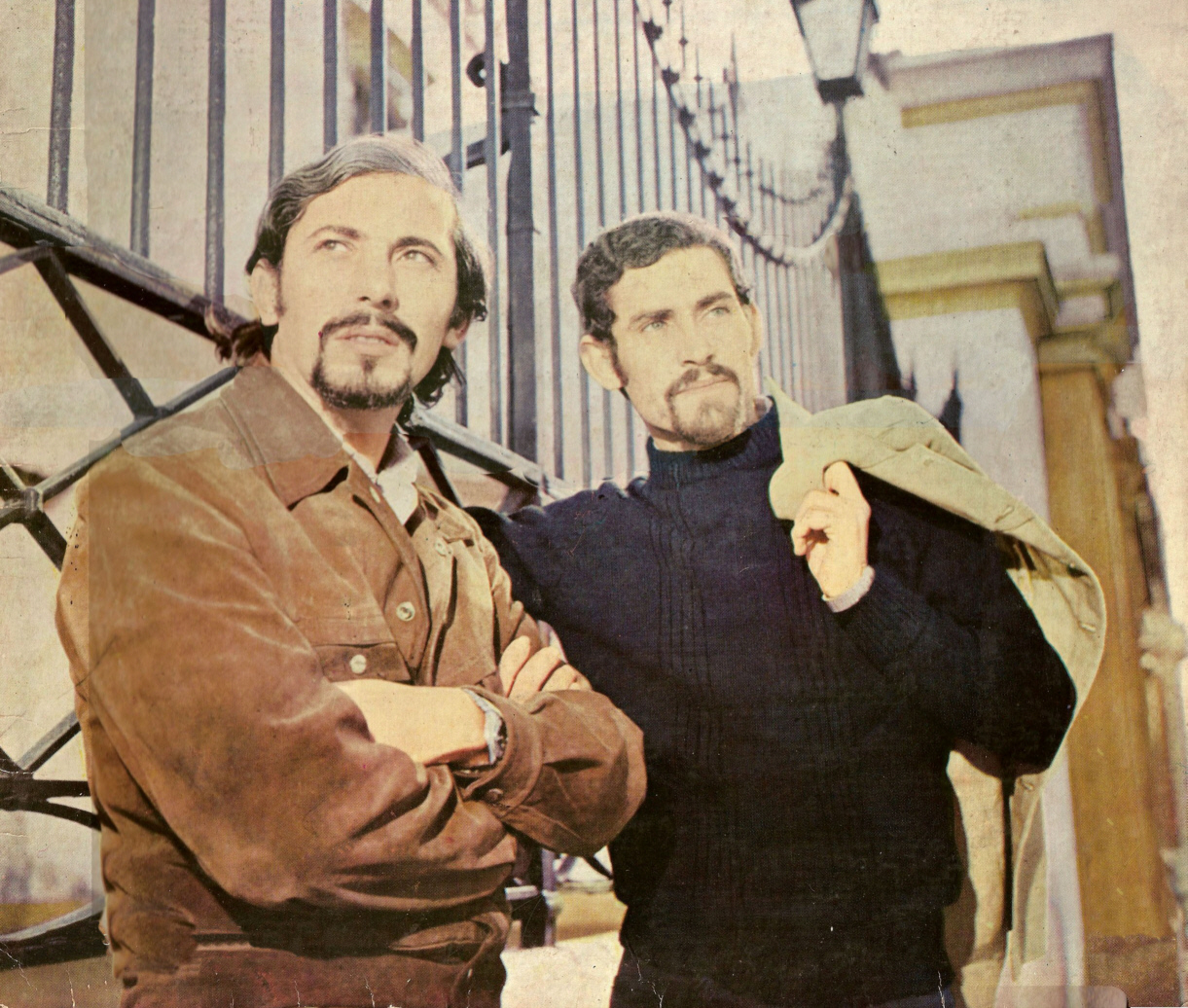
- Los Olimareños in 1973

Background information
- Origin: Treinta y Tres, Uruguay
- Genres: Traditional music
- Years active: 1962–1990
- Past members: Pepe Guerra; Braulio López

Los Olimareños was a Uruguayan musical group, formed by Pepe Guerra and Braulio López in 1962. The group enjoyed international success and a prolific musical career recording around 44 records.

== History ==
The group's name refers to the birth city of Guerra and López, Treinta y Tres, Uruguay, on the banks of the Olimar Grande River.

In the 1960s, they were part of the first movement of singing popular Uruguayan songs alongside Alfredo Zitarrosa, Daniel Viglietti, José Carbajal, Numa Moraes, among others.

The lyrics of their songs, written mostly by Ruben Lena and Victor Lima, reflected local issues and reflected the concerns and feelings of ordinary people, as well as everyday life in rural areas.

Despite having a great attachment to their country, they were not alien to social, cultural and political movements then taking place across Latin America. This led them to participate in various international calls, for example, "Encounter with the protest song" convened by La Casa de las Américas of Cuba, and conducted between 9 July and 10 August 1967.

As social unrest increased in Uruguay during the 1960s and the early 1970s, Los Olimareños, being consistent in their grassroots support, gradually began to include criticism of the repressive government in their songs. The Uruguayan coup d'état on 27 June 1973, resulted in a ban on their songs.

In 1974, they began an exile that would last ten years, during which they toured five continents, and settled for long periods in Mexico and Spain.

They returned to Uruguay on 18 May 1984 and sang at the Estadio Centenario, in Montevideo, under heavy rain to 50,000 people.

In 1990, the duo decided to disband, starting careers as solo performers.

A reunion concert was planned for 8 May 2009 at the Estadio Centenario, on the 25th anniversary of their 1984 concert.

Pepe Guerra died from cancer on 13 June 2024, at the age of 80.

== Discography ==
=== Albums ===
- Los Olimareños (1962)
- Los Olimareños en París (1964)
- De cojinillo (1965)
- Quiero a la sombra de un ala (1966)
- Canciones con contenido (1967)
- Estrofas de amor (1968)
- Nuestra razón (1969)
- Cielo del 69 (1969)
- Todos detrás de Momo (1971)
- ¡Que pena! (1971)
- Del templao (1972)
- Rumbo (1973)
- Los Olimareños (1973)
- ¿No lo conoce a Juan? (1973)
- Cantar opinando (1973)
- Cantando por el mundo (1974)
- Tierra negra (1975)
- La niña de Guatemala (1976)
- Junto al Jagüey (1976)
- Los Olimareños de Uruguay (1977)
- Donde arde el fuego nuestro (Mexico) (1978)
- Donde arde el fuego nuestro (España) (1979)
- Yacumenza (1981)
- 20 años (Mexico) (1982)
- 20 años (Ecuador) (1983)
- Los Olimareños (Serie inolvidable vol. I) (1983)
- Los Olimareños (Serie inolvidable vol. II) (1983)
- Donde arde el fuego nuestro (1984)
- Araca (1984)
- Sembrador de abecedario (1984)
- Cielito del Olimar (1984)
- Si éste no es el pueblo (1984)
- Los orientales (1984)
- Los Olimareños en Nueva York (1984)
- Orejano (1985)
- Los Olimareños en Ecuador (1985)
- 25 años (1987)
- Los Olimareños no Brasil (1988)
- Canciones ciudadanas (1988)

=== EPs and samples ===
- Los Olimareños (1962)
- Presentando a Los Olimareños (1962)
- Simple (Hasta siempre / Guantanamera) (1968)
- Simple (Sembrador de abecedario / Lejos de Treinta y Tres) (1969)
- Simple (A Don José / A orillas del Olimar) (1970)
- Simple (Hasta siempre / Ya me voy pa' la guerrilla) (1971)
- Simple (Mujer querida / El beso que te di) (1971)
- Los olimareños (1973)
- Simple (La partida / Tierra negra) (1975)

=== Compilations ===
- I Encuentro de la canción protesta (1967)
- Che vive (1968)
- Hasta siempre / Diga no! (1968)
- Protest song of Latin America (1970)
- Encuentro de música latinoamericana (1972)
- ¿Dónde están? (1979)
- Juntos vol. II (1984)
- El Canto Popular junto al PIT-CNT (1987)

=== Free catalog ===
- Antología (19??)
- El hombre del mameluco (19??)
- Los Olimareños en México (19??)

== See also ==
- List of folk musicians
- List of Uruguayans
- Music of Uruguay
