= Carlos Paravís =

Uruguayan folk musician and physician (1968–2024)

Carlos Ernesto Paravís Martínez (1968 – 21 May 2024) was a Uruguayan physician and folk singer.

== Biography ==
Paravís was born in Minas, Uruguay, to Carlos Paravís, a physician and notable folk singer also known as Santiago Chalar, and Adela Martínez Graña. He had three siblings: Adela, Santiago, and Isabel. He studied medicine in Montevideo.

Like his father he devoted himself to Uruguayan folk music. He developed a musical career in the name of keeping alive the memory and songs of his father.

Paravís died from esophageal cancer on 21 May 2024, at the age of 56. Shortly before his death he had taken part in the opening ceremony of the 37th edition of Festival Minas y Abril.

== Discography ==
- Homenaje a Santiago Chalar. 80 años (2019)
- ¡Ahora sí! (2016)
- Entre cuerdas y tu madera (1996)
