= Alfredo Zitarrosa =

- Born: Alfredo Iribarne; March 10, 1936; Montevideo, Uruguay
- Died: January 17, 1989 (aged 52) Montevideo, Uruguay
- Genres: milonga, candombe
- Occupations: Musician, songwriter, poet, journalist
- Instruments: Vocals, guitar
- Labels: Tonal, Orfeo, Odeón, Microfón, RCA
- Website: http://www.fundacionzitarrosa.org

Alfredo Zitarrosa (Montevideo, March 10, 1936 – January 17, 1989) was a Uruguayan singer-songwriter, poet and journalist. He is widely regarded as one of the most influential singer-songwriters of Latin America. He pioneered a new path in Uruguayan popular music, merging the rural folk tradition with the urban influences of tango. Milonga was the genre on which he based much of his work and for which he became best known. Using the traditional format of trios and quartets featuring guitars and guitarrón, he created a distinctive sound that is now synonymous with his name. His work combined social and political themes with reflections on human relationships and existential concerns. A staunch supporter of Communist ideals, he lived in exile between 1976 and 1984.

== Biography ==
Zitarrosa was born as the illegitimate son of 19-year-old Jesusa Blanca Nieve Iribarne (Blanca), in 143 Carlos Maria Ramírez Ave.Belvedere neighborhood, Montevideo, and was enrolled at The Pereira Rossell Hospital, after.

Shortly after being born, Blanca handed over her son to be raised by Carlos Durán, a man of many trades, and his wife, Doraisella Carbajal, then employed at the Council for Children, becoming Alfredo "Pocho" Durán. They lived in several cities neighbourhoods, and moved between 1944 and the end of 1947, they moved to the town of Santiago Vázquez. They frequently visited the countryside near Trinidad, capital city of the Flores Department, where Alfredo's adoptive mother was born. This childhood experience stayed with him forever, notably in his repertoire, the majority of which contains rhythms and songs of peasant origin, mainly milongas.

Alfredo briefly returned with his adoptive family, to Montevideo and in early adolescence, moved on to live with his biological mother and her husband, the Argentine Alfredo Nicolás Zitarrosa, who would eventually give him his surname. Together with his newborn sister, they lived in the area now known as Rincón de la Bolsa, at km. 29.50 of the old route to Colonia, San José Department. Based there, he commuted to study at the High School in Montevideo, where he eventually moved into his early youth. First he lived with the Duráns and then in Mrs. Ema's pension, located at Colonia and Medanos (today Barrios Amorín) streets, to fill after the famous attic of the house which was used as a pension and was owned by Blanca Iribarne, his mother, located on Yaguarón street (today Aquiles Lanza) 1021, in front of the plaza currently bearing his name nearby the Central Cemetery. He worked, among other duties, as a seller of furniture, subscriptions to a medical society, clerical and in a print shop. Some time later -his first employer recalls with special affection- a certain Pachelo, which was introduced by one of his colleagues in their usual trip to Montevideo daily shipments during his high school years.

He began his artistic career in 1954, as a radio broadcaster, entering as a presenter and entertainer, librettist and informativist, or even as an actor. He was also a writer, poet, and journalist, working for the famous weekly newspaper Marcha.

While he was in Peru, forced by circumstances and somewhat fortuitously, he made his professional debut as a singer. This occurred on February 20, 1964, in a program on Channel 13, Panamericana Television, thus beginning an uninterrupted career. Zitarrosa once recalled this experience: "No tenía ni un peso, pero sí muchos amigos. Uno de ellos, César Durand, regenteaba una agencia de publicidad y por sorpresa me incluyó en un programa de TV, y me obligó a cantar. Canté dos temas y cobré 50 dólares. Fue una sorpresa para mí, que me permitió reunir algunos pesos…" ("I had no money, but I had many friends. One of them, Cesar Durand, happened to manage a publicity agency and I was included in a TV program, and forced to sing. I was paid 50 dollars for two songs. It was a surprise for me, and it allowed me to earn some money…")

Shortly thereafter, going back to Bolivia by Uruguay, he conducted several programs on Radio Altiplano of La Paz, debuting later in Montevideo, back in 1965, in the auditorium of SODRE (Radio Broadcasting Service Officer). His participation in this space served him as a stepping stone to be invited, in early 1966, at recognized Festival of Cosquín, in Argentina, again in 1985.

On February 29, 1968, he married Nancy Marino, with whom he had his eldest daughter Carla Moriana January 27, 1970, and his youngest daughter María Serena on December 12, 1973

From the beginning of his career, he became known as a prominent Latin American musician whose music incorporated leftist-wing political themes and elements of folkloric. His style was characterized by a deep voice and guitar accompaniment.

He entered and adhered to the Frente Amplio of the Uruguayan left, fact which earned him ostracism and finally exile during the years of dictatorship. His songs were banned in Argentina, Chile and Uruguay during the dictatorial regimes that ruled those countries. He lived then successively in Argentina, Spain and Mexico, starting from February 9, 1976.

After the ban on his music was lifted, like that of so many in Argentina after the Falklands War, he settled again in Buenos Aires, where he gave three memorable concerts at the Arena Obras Sanitarias the first day of July 1983. Almost a year after he returned to his country, he had a massive reception in the historic concert of March 31, 1984, which was described by him as la experiencia más importante de mi vida ("the most important experience of my life").

== Work ==
Among the songs which became big hits are included Doña Soledad, (Miss Soledad), Crece desde el Pie (It grows from the foot), Recordándote (Remembering you), Stéfanie, Adagio a mi país (Adagio to my country), Zamba por vos (Zamba for you), Becho's violin and the poem by milonga Guitarra negra (Black Guitar).

As a poet, he was honored by the Inspectorate of Montevideo with the Municipal Poetry Award of 1959, for the book Explicaciones (Explanations), which he never wanted to publish. In 1988 his storybook Por si el recuerdo (In case I remember), was published, containing stories written at various times during his life.

== His life in his creations ==
Like any artist, Alfredo Zitarrosa's work is nourished by several sources, however, when regarding Zitarrosa, the highly autobiographical nature of his compositions is a vital consideration. For example, Pájaro rival (Rival Bird), where he reflects a deep existential concern and even has a premonition of his approaching death, which occurred shortly after the end of the record. The recording is included on birds and souls, published posthumously in 1989:

Por sanar de una herida he gastado mi vida pero igual la viví y he llegado hasta aquí.

Por morir, por vivir, porque la muerte es más fuerte que yo canté y viví en cada copla sangrada querida cantada nacida y me fui...

Translation:

For healing a wound
I have spent my life
but I lived it anyway
I was born and I left

To die, to live,
because death is stronger than me
I sang and lived in each couplet
bled loved sung
born and gone...

That wound which speaks beyond doubt existential common to any human being, has to do with his particular personal history, which is reflected in Explicación de mi amor (Explanation of my love), a song which brings together elements of the three parents who had, primarily the biological one, who refused, and whose shadow pursued him all his life:

Mi padre serás, como fuiste mi padre, un gameto en la grieta cerrada del tiempo...

Mas mientras te busque en las cosas, en tanto regreses sin que yo te llame o te olvide, te pido que limpies mi amargo dolor; por favor, que no sigas muriendo.

Translation:

My father you will be, as you were my father,
a gamete in the closed crack of time …

But as long as I look for you in things,
as long as you return without my calling you or forgetting you,
I ask you to clean my bitter pain;
please do not continue to die.

Or that he lived with his adoptive father, Carlos Durán, whom he accompanied in his last days. Years later, he recalled the episode: "Carlos no era mi padre y yo lo sabía. Era muy viejo para ser mi mejor amigo, pero cuando ya viudo me pidió que no lo abandonara, sentí que más que mi padrastro era mi hermano, y lo acompañé hasta el final, y lo enterré, con la ayuda de sus sobrinos auténticos, después de rescatarlo, desnudo, de la morgue del Hospital Militar. Su ataúd sonó como un bramido al dar un tumbo en el fondo del Panteón Policial del Buceo".

"Carlos was not my father and I knew it. He was too old to be my best friend, but when being a widower he asked me not to leave him, I felt that more than being my stepfather he was my brother, and I accompanied him until the end, and I buried him, with the help of his genuine nephews, after rescuing him naked, from the morgue of the Military Hospital. His coffin sounded like a roar when it impacted the bottom of the Police Graveyard in Buceo".(Refers to the cemetery located in the Montevidean neighborhood known as "El Buceo" [The Diving]).

...voz ronca de un órgano ya enmudecido,
ahí estás, larga caja de pino.

Translation:

… Hoarse voice of a organ already silent,
There you are, long pine box.

He paid tribute to the same Carlos Durán, who had been, among other trades, police ('milico' in the popular language) by necessity, dedicating one of its most emblematic, Chamarrita de los milicos (Chamarrita song about soldiers). He explains it this way: "[…] Fue escrita de un tirón en la mesa de un bar de Bvar. Artigas y 18 de julio, el 27 de enero de 1970. Ese día había nacido mi hija Carla Moriana y yo sentía que le estaba escribiendo al que no pudo ser su abuelo, mi padre adoptivo, Carlos Durán, quien siendo hijo de coronel ‘colorado’, había terminado de ‘milico’ en los años 40. Pobres como éramos, yo recuerdo el gran revólver de mi padre, descargado, que él guardaba en un cajón del ‘trinchante’, después de quitarse ‘las correas’, cada noche o cada mañana, según las guardias. Las balas, siempre separadas, olían a todas las cosas que allí guardaba mamá. Yo no podía imaginarme de qué modo se abrían, ni qué demonios tendrían adentro que eran tan peligrosas. Pero eran, esas balas y ese revólver, el lujo subalterno de aquella humilde casa, una prenda del Estado -así me decían- que mi padre portaba como una penitencia no exenta de cierto orgullo vacilante." "[…] was written at a stretch in a bar table of Bvar. Artigas and July 18, January 27, 1970. That day my daughter Carla Moriana was born and I felt I was writing to the one who could not be his grandfather, my adoptive father, Carlos Durán, who being the son of a Colonel 'Colorado', had ended up being a 'milico' in the 1940s. Poor as we were, I remember the large revolver of my father unloaded, which he kept in a drawer of the 'trinchante', after taking off his 'straps' every night or every morning, depending on the shifts. The bullets, always separated, smelled all the things kept there by my mother. I couldn't imagine how they were opened, or what the hell they had inside which was so dangerous. But those bullets and that gun, the luxury of that humble home, a property of the government – so I was told – which my father was carrying as a punishment not exempt of a certain hesitant pride."

Chamarrita cuartelera, no te olvides que hay gente afuera,

cuando cantes pa’ los milicos, no te olvides que no son ricos, y el orgullo que no te sobre, no te olvides que hay otros pobres.

Translation:

Song of Barracks,
don't forget there are people outside

when you sing for the soldiers,
don't forget that they are not rich,
and the pride you don't have in excess,
don't forget that there are other poor.

Many of his songs reflected also his knowledge of the countryside and rural areas, acquired during his childhood in his frequent visits to his mother's adoptive brothers, especially his uncle José Pepe Carbajal. He said: "Todas las vacaciones, en el tiempo de verano, yo me iba al centro mismo del país, a la ciudad de Trinidad, capital del departamento de Flores, que -tal vez- es el más atrasado de estos departamentos del interior del país; una zona eminentemente ganadera, de grandes latifundios (…) Allí yo he pasado los tres meses de verano, desde que recuerdo hasta los 12 años, desde muy pequeño hasta los 12 años. Allí, claro, aprendí todo lo que sé del campo, aunque más tarde viviera en el campo también, pero ya de adolescente. Aprendí a montar a caballo, a ordeñar; cosas del campo... a cazar". In my vacations, in the summertime, I always went to the heart of the country, to the city of Trinidad, capital of the department of Flores, who is perhaps the most backward of these interior departments of the country, an area which depends predominantly on cattle breeding and growing, of large estates [...] As far as I remember I spent there the three summer months, from my childhood until I was 12 years old, from. There, of course, I learned everything I know about the countryside chores, although later I lived in the countryside too, but as a teenager. I learned to ride on horseback, to milk; countryside.stuff.. how to hunt". This made attendance to take special preference for music jacket, and that will permeate his personality with campesino traits, giving more elements to his creations. The milonga Mi tierra en invierno (My land in winter) is one of them, which shows his knowledge of the various facets of rural life.

The attachment to the horse and his special care, as an essential element in the daily tasks:

[…] y aunque el caballo esté sano,
lo cuida de la garganta
que, aunque el caballo no canta,
lo ha de tener siempre a mano.

Translation:

[…] and although the horse is healthy,
he takes care of its throat
which although the horse does not sing,
he must always have it at hand. (near)

The chores with livestock:

[…] porque llegado setiembre
será tiempo de castración,
de marcar y descolar...

Translation:

[…] Because come September
it will be castration time,
Marking and "descolar" …

Pests:

[…] Hay que vigilar la hormiga
que hace pirva en campo llano...

Translation:

...We need to monitor the ant
which makes "pirva" its anthill on the plain …

Or the times of harvest:

[…] se trilla el trigo en diciembre.

Translation:

..wheat is threshed in December.

In his early youth, and as tired announcer on the radio, in Montevideo, his artistic call begins to awake and passion for Boheme, and the night and its ghosts. These are times of various experiments, testing his ability in different art fields. The core of that stage of his life takes place in the Barrio Sur (South District), where he lives in a house in front of a square, which also neighbours the cemetery; that black place-neighborhood, candombe, carnival, call, humble people, solidarity and fraternal-left its mark on the sensitivity of young Alfredo Zitarrosa, which is, historically, a particular inclination : apparently wants more, displayed as a serious and circumspect person, for the sake of doing so and also, perhaps, pretend have always because of his youth. That got to the point of being an obsession, which made him wear glasses, which he did not need for the purpose of increasing his apparent age. Over time, and in his profession as a singer, he always presented himself in his performances, somewhere outside, dressed in the traditional manner, wearing a suit and a tie and having a strictly formal appearance.

Shown elements and circumstances relating to this stage of his life in several songs, one of them is Coplas del canto (Poems of the song), where states:

De tanto vivir frente
del cementerio
no me asusta la muerte
ni su misterio.

Translation:

Because of having lived so long opposite to
the cemetery
I'm not afraid of death
or its mystery.

And in one of his most recognized songs, Candombe del olvido (Candombe of oblivion), composed many years later, which is based almost entirely on the evocation of that time:

Ya no recuerdo el jardín de la casa, ya nadie me espera en la plaza. Suaves candombes, silencios y nombres de otros; se cambian los rostros.

Quién me dará nuevamente mi voz inocente, mi cara con lentes. Cómo podré recoger las palabras habladas, sus almas heladas.

Qué duros tiempos, el ángel ha muerto, los barcos dejaron el puerto. Tiempo de amar, de dudar, de pensar y luchar, de vivir sin pasado.

Tiempo raudal, una luz cenital cae a plomo en la fiesta de Momo, tiempo torrente que fluye; por Isla de Flores llegan los tambores.

Fuego verde, llamarada, de tus roncos tambores del Sur, techos de seda bordada.

...el candombe es una planta que crece, y hasta el cielo se estremece.

Translation:

I do no longer remember the garden of the house,
No one is waiting for me in the square.
Soft candombes, silences and names
of others (persons); faces change.

Who will give me back my innocent voice
My face wearing glasses.
How will I be able to gather the spoken words,
Their frozen souls.

Those were hard times, the angel is dead,
The boats left the port.
Time to love, to doubt, to think and fight,
To live without a past.

Abundant time a zenith light
Falls vertical in the party of Momo,
Time a flowing stream;
through Isla de Flores street the drums arrive.

green flame, flare,
from your hoarse drums from the south Your
roofs made of embroidered silk.

… Candombe is a growing plant,
And even the sky shivers.

== Other texts ==
Fragment Guitarra Negra (Black Guitar):

"Hoy anduvo la muerte revisando los ruidos del teléfono, distintos bajo los dedos índices, las fotos, el termómetro, los muertos y los vivos, los pálidos fantasmas que me habitan, sus pies y manos múltiples, sus ojos y sus dientes, bajo sospecha de subversión... Y no halló nada... No pudo hallar a Batlle, ni a mi padre, ni a mi madre, ni a Marx, ni a Arístides, ni a Lenin, ni al Príncipe Kropotkin, ni al Uruguay ni a nadie... ni a los muertos Fernández más recientes... A mí tampoco me encontró... Yo había tomado un ómnibus al Cerro e iba sentado al lado de la vida..."

"Today death was browsing the noises of the telephone, different under index fingers, photographs, the thermometer, the dead and the living, the pale ghosts inhabiting me, their multiple hands and feet, their eyes and their teeth, on suspicion of subversion... And did not find anything... Unable to find Batlle, or my father or my mother, neither Marx nor Arístides, or Lenin, or the Prince Kropotkin, or the Uruguay nor anyone... Nor to the latest dead Fernandez … it found neither me... I had taken a bus to Cerro and was sitting next to life..."

Excerpt from El Violín de Becho (Becho's fiddle):

Porque a Becho le duelen violines
que son como su amor, chiquilines;
Becho quiere un violín que sea hombre,
que al dolor y al amor no los nombre.

Translation:

Because violins hurt Becho
that are as his love, small children;
Becho wants a violin that manly
which does not mention pain and love.

== Discography ==
=== Studio albums ===
- Canta Zitarrosa (1966)
- Del amor herido (1967)
- Yo sé quién soy (1968)
- Zitarrosa / 4 (1969)
- Milonga madre (1970)
- Coplas del canto (1971)
- Alfredo Zitarrosa (1972)
- Adagio en mi país (1973)
- Zitarrosa 74 (1974)
- Desde Tacuarembó (1975]
- Recordándote (1976)
- Guitarra negra (Spain) (1977)*
- Guitarra negra (Mexico) (1978)*
- Milonga de ojos dorados (1979)
- Candombe del olvido (1979)
- Adiós Madrid (1979)
- Textos políticos (1980)
- Volveremos (1980)
- Si te vas (1982)
- De regreso (1984)
- Melodía larga (1984)
- Guitarra negra (Uruguay) (1985)*
- Melodía larga 2 (1987)
- Sobre pájaros y almas (with Héctor Numa Moraes) (1989)

*Zitarrosa made three albums with the same title, with different recordings of his work "Guitarra Negra" occupying one side of the disc and the other side with different songs in each case.

== See also ==
- Atahualpa Yupanqui (Argentinian, with a comparable style)
- Mercedes Sosa
- Los Olimareños
- Music of Uruguay
