= Latejapride* =

Uruguayan musical group

latejapride*
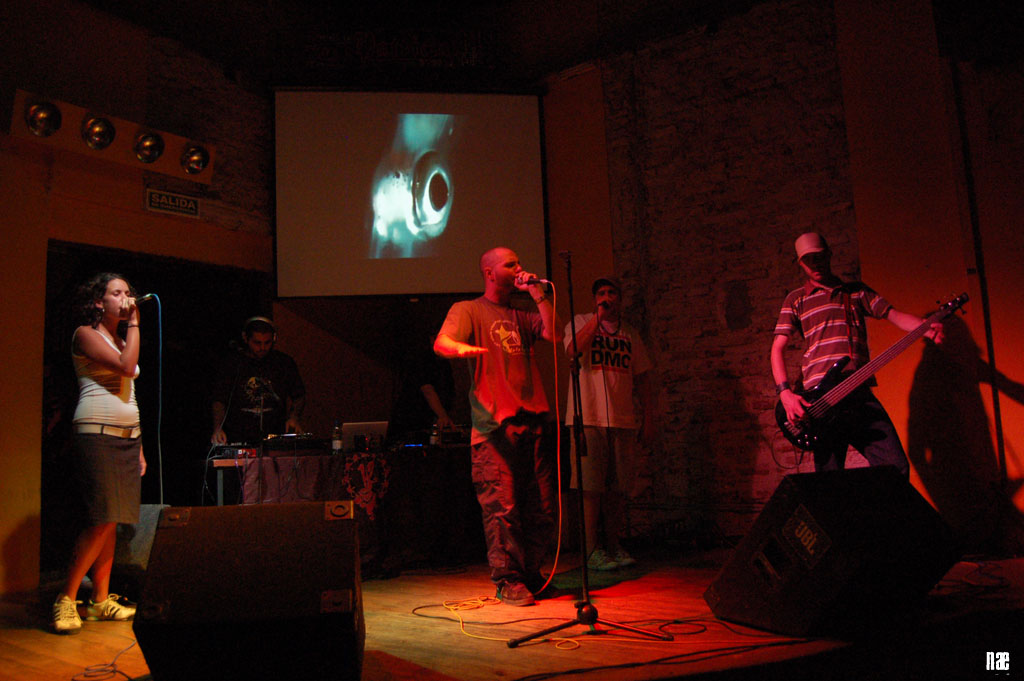
- latejapride* in 2008

Background information
- Origin: Uruguay, Montevideo
- Genres: Alternative hip hop
- Years active: 1997–present
- Label: Bizarro Records
- Members: Davich (MC/beatmaker); Barragán (MC/beatmaker); Leonidas (selector/MC); Alvaro Grasso (studio guitar and bass guitar; live sound engineer); Martín Sierra (percussion)
- Past members: Crisarc (percussion); Daniel "Vampiro" Noble (electric guitar); Marcelo "Gezzio" Geninnazzio (DJ); Ismael Carnales (samplers); Iván Krisman (bass guitar/rock agent); Alvaro "Coco" Caner (acoustic guitar); Lorena Nader (melodic voice); Leonardo "DJ Irish" Rodríguez (DJ/transformer of chaos into order)
- Website: Official website

Latejapride* (previously La Teja Pride, nowadays latejapride* or ltp*, asterisk and all) is an alternative hip hop band/collective from Montevideo, Uruguay, strongly associated with the looser paths of the genre, which has led them to enrich their sounds with elements as dissimilar as drum and bass drums, down tempo climaxes, funk bass lines, soul guitars, a bit of rock, flirting with hardcore hip hop, sticky and redundant rhythms rooted in dub, and a long "etc". The band has had a large number of musicians, with brothers Edgardo (Davich) and Leonard (Leonidas) Mattioli as only constant members.

== History ==
The band's history, if you count their releases as milestones, could be divided in four important eras: the absolute underground (with several EPs and other independent recordings, 1997–2002), and starting with their first label album, eras named after their releases: Filosofías de Insomnio (Philosophies of Insomnia, 2002–2004), Tiempos Modernos (Modern Times, 2005–2006), Effecto Dominó (Domino Effect, 2007–2008), and Nómades (2009-current).

=== Absolute Underground (1997–2002) ===
ltp* takes its first steps in the final months of 1997, during a time in which the hip hop genre was being highly advertised, particularly by MTV. It is then when they start to play on stage, without much knowledge or a polished sound, but with enthusiasm. Their sound in particular lacked polish because it was strongly conditioned by the technological tools the band members had access to during the time. At first they used a Commodore Amiga 1200, an 8-bit sampler, and a Boss Dr. 5 rhythm box. Their sound was basic, with strong drums, blues and jazz samples, and simple bass lines, almost to the point of saturation (more because they liked it that way, than due to the technical limitations).

Their first demo is from 1998–99, produced by Maneco, then member of Uruguayan band Elefante (later Rendher). It was filled with funk references, with samples from musicians like James Brown and other examples of the genre. This first demo allowed them to knock on the door of any radio that would let them in; primarily community radios (a relationship which still lasts to these days) and the show Mundo Cañon, in the popular X FM radio.

Originally the band is made up of five members, but the core of the band ends up being the aforementioned Mattioli brothers (Davich and Leonidas) as MCs, and DJ Irish; in what is the most typical hip hop expression in terms of music (perhaps the only one they'd reflect): two MCs and one DJ.

Around this time the band plays primarily in stages of their hometown of Montevideo, flirting with the local hardcore punk scene; playing in festivals full of bands of those genres. Their means of transportation was usually public buses, with mixers and turntables under their arms, and vinyls and minidiscs in backpacks.

During the years 2000/2001 they take part of a collective called Oeste Pro Funk (Pro Funk West), a gathering of hip hop bands and solo acts, attempting to combine their momentums. OPF releases an album with tracks by all of their members: bands La Teja Pride and Contra Las Cuerdas, plus MCs DRRVI (Nicolás Barragán, today known only by his last name, current member of ltp*) and Canona (former member of Critical Zone).

=== Philosophies of Insomnia (2002–2004) ===
2002 was a year full of deep transformations for latejapride*, starting by their lineup. DJ Irish left the band, with Marcelo “Gezzio” Geninazzio joining as DJ, Ismael Carnales on samplers, and Leonidas and Davich staying as MCs, while the latter took the mantle of "beatmaker". The band's sound starts to sound more like a re-interpretation of down tempo and its variations (trip hop, jazz, chill out, etc.), something that becomes more obvious in their live presentations, which the band started to fill with long and slow-paced instrumental interludes, interspaced between faster-paced tracks where the MCs were the center of attention. In this context the band comes up with the concept of an EP that would be recorded and later distributed under the name "Sueños de Invierno" (Winter Dreams).

The EP was a step up from previous releases in its physical presentation, which graphic design by photographer Naela Vitureira (cousin of the Mattioli brothers, and from that date, steady associate of the band), showing more professionalism not only sound-wise, but package-wise. During this time the band also starts to experiment with audiovisual projections to complement their live shows, initially over their instrumental tracks. The first show with projections took place in the Florencio Sanchez theater in Montevideo, on September 22, 2001. The first videos shown along with instrumental tracks "Tauro" and "Domenica Intermezzo" were selections from the anime Neon Genesis Evangelion, compiled and projected by Martín "MaGnUs" Pérez, a job that was later taken over by VJ Saurio in a more professional capacity, and then by the collective known as Elementum Crew.

Sueños de Invierno received a wider exposure than previous releases by the band, which allowed them, among other things, to create a link with the Uruguayan record label Bizarro Records. After a conversation via e-mail and some informal meetings with Andrés Sanabria, art director of the label, an agreement was reached. latejapride* would produce and record an album on their own, and Bizarro would release and distribute it. The album was named Filosofías de Insomnio (Philosophies of Insomnia), and it was produced by Daniel Anselmi (locally prestigious electronic musician, and member of the band Amnios), releasing it in September 2003.

While recording the album, the band had to revise their creative processes, in several aspects. On one hand, the experience of working with Anselmi was fruitful, since it not only provided them with a work method that served to counter the chaotic creative processes of the band, but the producer also made significant artistic contributions. New members joined the band, first Iván Krisman on bass guitar, and after recording and releasing the album, most of the musicians that had played on it were welcomed into the band properly. Lorena Nader joined as a singer, Daniel "Vampiro" Noble joined on the electric guitar, and Coco Cáner joined playing the electroacoustic guitar. Old partners of the band were also guests on the album, like the band Contra Las Cuerdas and the solo rapper El Barragán (formerly DRRVI, both from Oeste Pro Funk), and the now defunct rock band Kirlian.

As a side project, the band composes and plays live music for the play "El Hueco" (The Hole), written by Gabriel Peveroni and directed by María Dodera. This activity earns them a Florencio Award, the maximum award in Uruguayan theater. During this period, in the year 2004, latejapride* is part of the second volume of a tribute to poet Pablo Neruda, "Marinero En Tierra" (Seaman On Land"), along with other Uruguayan artists like Jorge Drexler, Sordromo, and Jorge Nasser; as well as international ones like La Oreja De Van Gogh, Alex Ubago and Ruben Blades.

=== Modern Times (2005–2006) ===
Tiempos Modernos (Modern Times) was the second album of the band, released in September 2005. Its sound was clearly different to what latejapride* had been doing so far. The guitars, which before were almost exclusively window dressing, now had a starring role, while downtempo was set aside, and the MCs' strength resurfaced after years of electronic experimentation. It took literally a thousand studio hours to record and mix, with Daniel Anselmi again as producer, this time joined by Davich.

Home studios were also set aside, since the more rock sound of the band now required professional recording studios; Oasis being the studio of choice. The band's lineup also changed, with the return of DJ Irish and the exit of Gezzio and Ismael Carnales.

Touring the country with this album, ltp* played in places as diverse as discothèques, pubs, festivals, as well as events hosted by social organizations such as NGO and workers unions, due to the band's long standing social conscience (something reflected in their lyrics). Among other side projects, the band remixes the theme from TV show The Twilight Zone as an ending theme for radio show "Perdidos En El Eter".

=== Domino Effect (2007–2008) ===
Little by little, the band started to go back to the sound system scheme; with entrenched DJs that allow MCs to launch themselves to victory or noble defeat, with a microphone in hand and the beat on their shoulders. Leonidas decided to concentrate on turntables and samplers along with DJ Irish, without abandoning the emceeing completely. El Barragán joins the band, not only as MC but supporting Davich as a beatmaker. Krisman and Nader remain in the band (the latter spending some time in Europe, though), while Cáner and Noble leave.

Their third album, Effecto Dominó (Domino Effect) is released in November 2007, and again it shows an evolution of the band's sound, with Daniel Anselmi's production as usual. The absence of non-sampled guitars once again make the scratches and programmed drums the musical stars; perhaps due to the presence of two DJs.

Strong drum and bass and downtempo influences return, joined by new influences from styles like reggae and bossa nova. The political, social, and even environmental content of the lyrics is again present, as was to be expected; but this is not a redundant album. On the contrary, the themes, apart from those mentioned, show a sense of belonging to a global (but not globalized) community, reflected in one of the lines from its first track: stories of a thousand cities, and a single neighborhood.

As usual, not only for ltp* but for most hip hop acts, and the Uruguayan scene in general, the album includes collaborations by several guests: Lys Gainza, Marcela Schenck, Santullo (formerly L. Mental, member of Peyote Asesino and Bajofondo), Cucaracha Sound System and Luisa Pereira.

latejapride*, since the release of their first label album, has played in almost all of Uruguay, also playing in Argentina (Buenos Aires and Santa Fe) and Brazil (Porto Alegre and Rio de Janeiro).

In May 2008, the band received the Graffiti Award for best "Pop/Rock/Alternative" album (the Graffitis are the main music awards in the country), and the Iris award for "Album of the Year", given by El País, one of the largest newspapers in the country.

=== Nomads (2009-current) ===
In 2009 the band releases their fourth album, Nómades (Nomads). This album follows the creative line started in the previous one, Effecto Dominó. With twelve tracks, the album keeps rap as the central genre, although the beats are still influenced by other rhythms, in keeping with (according to the band) the concept of music to enjoy with the body, of the physical of its art as center of all compositions.

So far, they've produced three videoclips for this album, Portarse Mal, Abandonado, and Esquivando Penas.

In 2011, the Uruguayan Music Cluster publishes its catalog, including the band's albums.

== Discography ==
=== LP ===
- Filosofías de Insomnio (Bizarro Records. 2003)
- Tiempos Modernos (Bizarro Records. 2005)
- Efecto Dominó (Bizarro Records. 2007)
- Nómades (Bizarro Records. 2009)

=== EP ===
- La Teja Pride EP (Independent. 1998 - 1999)
- Sueños de Invierno (Independent. 2002)
- Colección de Pequeños Errores y Otras Falacias Rítmicas (Nota Negra. 2009)

=== Collaborations ===
- Oeste Pro Funk (Independent. 2001)
- Tributo a Neruda: Marinero en Tierra, volumen 2 (Bizarro Records. 2004)
