= Minas, Uruguay =

Minas
- Capital city
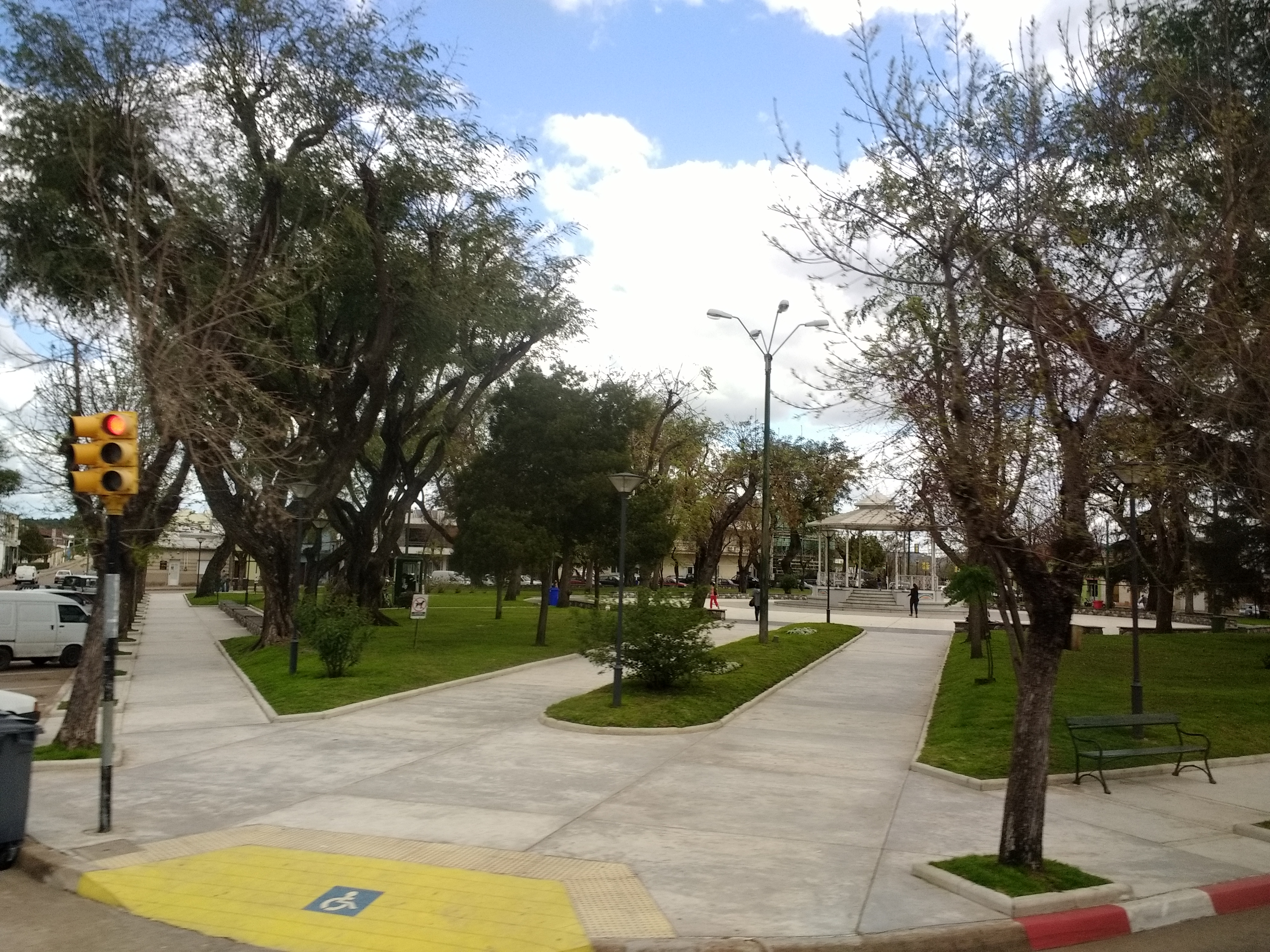
- Plaza Rivera

- Location within Uruguay
- Coordinates: 34°22′0″S 55°14′0″W
- Country: Uruguay
- Department: Lavalleja
- Founded: 1783

Area
  - Total: 19.6 km^{2} (7.6 sq mi)
- Elevation: 140 m (460 ft)

Population (2023 Census)
  - Total: 38,645
  - Density: 1,970/km^{2} (5,110/sq mi)
  - Demonym: minuano
- Time zone: UTC -3
- Postal code: 30000
- Dial plan: +598 444 (+5 digits)
- Climate: Cfa
- Website: lavalleja.gub.uy

Minas (Spanish pronunciation: [ˈminas]) is the capital of the Lavalleja Department in Uruguay. As of the census of 2011, it is the twelfth-most populated city in the country.

== Geography ==
The city is located in the south of the department, on the intersection of Route 8 with Route 12.

It lies between hill ranges and the basins of the Arroyo San Francisco and Arroyo Campanero streams.

== History ==
A town was founded here in 1783 as "Villa de la Concepción de las Minas" when a number of families from the Asturias and Galicia regions of Spain settled in the area following a frustrated attempt to populate Patagonia. The idea of a city in the area was first raised in 1753 by Jose Joaquin de Viana, the governor of Montevideo, who wanted to create a population centre in "the zones of the mines". He commissioned Rafael Perez Del Puerto to design the layout of the city, the basis of which remains in place today.

On October 8, 1830, it was declared a town, and on June 16, 1837, by decree Ley Nº 158, it became the capital of the "Department of Minas". On May 16, 1888, its status was elevated to that of city by decree Ley Nº 1.980. On December 26, 1927, after the renaming of the department, it became the capital of the "Department of Lavalleja" by decree Ley Nº 8.187.

== Population ==
According to the 2011 census, the area of Minas had a population of 38,446.
The following areas are considered by some as part of the Minas urban area:

- Blanes Viale: 104
- Barrio La Coronilla - Ancap: 301
- San Francisco de las Sierras: 58

As a result, the total population of the Minas area can be said to be 38,909.

Year	Population
1908	13,345
1963	31,256
1975	35,225
1985	34,658
1996	37,146
2004	37,925
2011	38,446
2023	38,645

Source: Instituto Nacional de Estadística de Uruguay

== Features ==
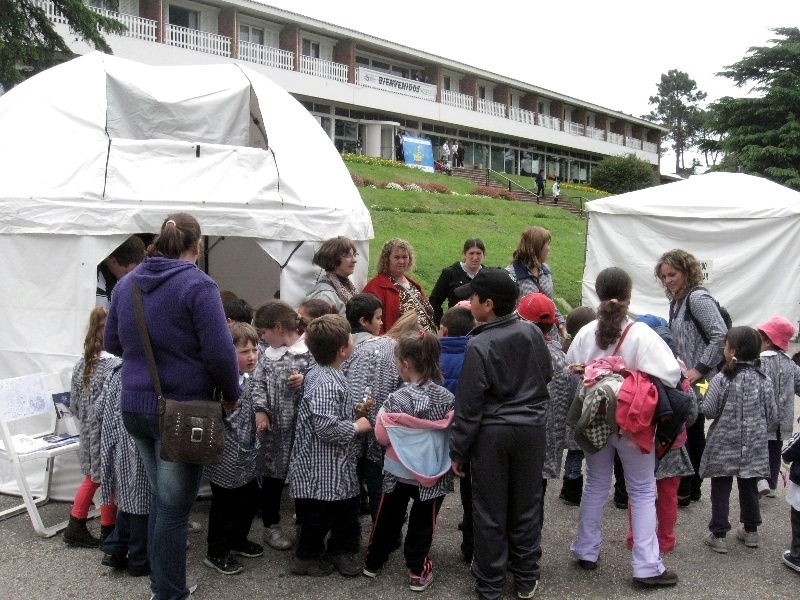
A national science fair in Parque de Vacaciones UTE-ANTEL.

In the city

In the northeastern part of town, where a zoological garden was located, the main public park of the city "Parque Rodó" was developed. Its facilities include restrooms, a garden, two playgrounds for children, a swimming pool, an area for picnic, a restaurant, a walking trail, parking lots, a small farm with a few animals (peacocks, swans, llamas), several sport pitches and a small stadium, in which two yearly festivals take place, one in April "Minas & Abril" and the other in October "Semana de Lavalleja".

=== Cerro Artigas ===
At the east end of the city is Cerro Artigas, a hill with a park containing a statue of the 19th-century Uruguayan hero General José Artigas on horseback, a work of Stelio Belloni.

Surrounding area

The Parque Salto del Penitente lies 16 kilometres (9.9 mi) east of the city; 9 kilometres (5.6 mi) to the west-southwest is Parque Salus and 6 kilometres (3.7 mi) to the southeast is the Parque de Vacaciones UTE-ANTEL, a park for the vacation use of employees of the Uruguayan Electricity Company and the Uruguayan Telecommunications Company. Villa Serrana is a scenic village located in the hills about 25 kilometres (16 mi) northeast of Minas.

== Places of worship ==
- Cathedral of the Immaculate Conception (Roman Catholic)
- St. Joseph Parish Church (Roman Catholic)
- St. Thérèse of Lisieux Parish Church (Roman Catholic, Redemptorists)
- Our Lady of Fatima Parish Church (Roman Catholic)
- Our Lady of Verdun National Sanctuary, a popular pilgrimage shrine on top of Verdún Hill

== Notable people ==
Minas is the birthplace of:

- Juan Antonio Lavalleja, the revolutionary leader during Uruguayan independence, after whom the department is named.
- Juan José Morosoli, Uruguayan writer.
- Arturo Ardao, Uruguayan philosopher and historian.
- Sebastián Abreu, Uruguayan professional soccer player.
- Gustavo Trelles, Uruguayan racing driver
- Carlos Paravís, folk musician

== Twin towns ==
- Coro, Venezuela
- Amiens, France
