= Osiris Rodríguez Castillos =

Uruguayan musician

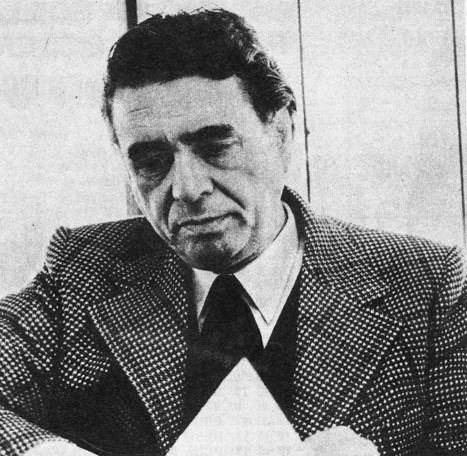
Osiris Rodríguez Castillos

Osiris Rodríguez Castillos (July 21, 1925 – October 10, 1996) was a Uruguayan writer, poet, composer and singer.

== Discography ==
=== LP ===
- Poems and songs Oriental ( Antar PLP 5018. Montevideo, 1962 )
- The Outsider ( RCA Victor AVL 3663. Buenos Aires and Montevideo, 1966 )
- Volume 3 ( plant KL 8703. Montevideo, 1969 )
- Maroons ( Sondor 33132. Montevideo, 1973 )
- Stone Birds (Sondor 33,151. Montevideo, Epic 1974, Buenos Aires, 1974 )

=== EP ===
- Song for my river (Antar FP 33-035. Montevideo, 1963 )
- Osiris ( Gold Laut 5000)

=== Reissues and compilations ===
- Maroons ( Sondor 3132-2. 1996 )
- Malevo Romance ( Fingerboard 155,380, Argentina. 1997 )
- The Outsider (Ayuí / Tacuabé am41cd. 2008 )

== Literary work ==
- Lavalleja General Romance (1953)
- Grillo nochero (1955)
- "1904" Red Moon (1957)
- Jacinto tenths Moon (1957)
- Burial of Carnival (Freedom Gallery. 1960)
- Cantos North and South (1962)
- Song and Poetry (1974)
- Life and Adventures of gaucho Wire (Alkali Editorial. 1979)
- The New Adventures of gaucho Wire (1980)
