= List of Uruguayan Catholic priests =

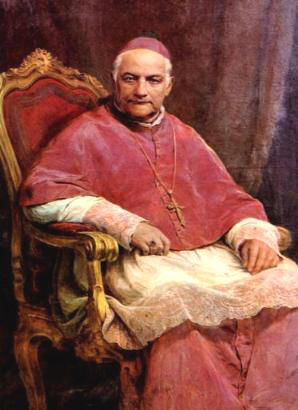
Venerable Jacinto Vera y Durán, first Roman Catholic bishop of Montevideo.

List of notable Uruguayan Roman Catholic clerics:

A

- Gonzalo Aemilius
- Juan Francisco Aragone

B

- Antonio María Barbieri
- Francisco Barbosa
- Manuel Barreiro
- Heriberto Bodeant

C

- Roberto Cáceres
- Carlos Collazzi
- Nicolás Cotugno

D

- Pablo Dabezies
- Luis del Castillo Estrada

F

- Arturo Fajardo
- Lorenzo Antonio Fernández

G

- Pablo Galimberti
- José Gottardi

I

L

- José Benito Lamas
- Dámaso Antonio Larrañaga
- Juan Francisco Larrobla

M

- José Benito Monterroso

N

O

P

- Carlos Parteli
- Miguel Paternain

Q

R

- Francisca Rubatto

S

- Juan Luis Segundo
- Mariano Soler
- Daniel Sturla

T

- Milton Tróccoli

V

- Jacinto Vera y Durán
- Mateo Vidal

W

- Rodolfo Wirz

Y

- Inocencio María Yéregui
