= Catholic Church in Uruguay =

- Spanish: Iglesia Católica en Uruguay
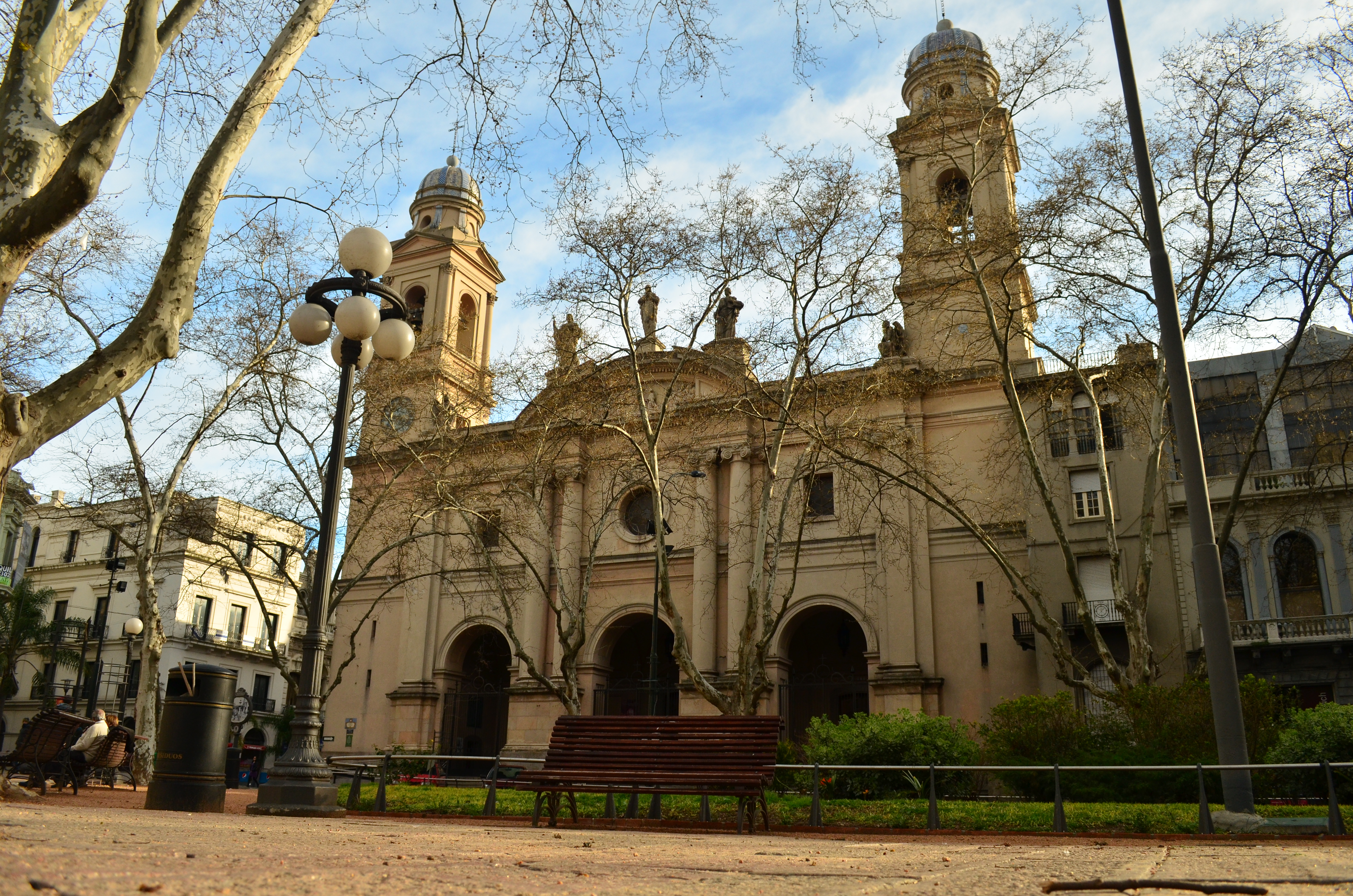
- Cathedral Basilica of the Immaculate Conception and San Felipe y Santiago in Montevideo
- Type: National polity
- Classification: Catholic
- Orientation: Latin
- Scripture: Bible
- Theology: Catholic
- Polity: Episcopal
- Pope: Leo XIV
- Cardinal: Daniel Sturla
- Region: Uruguay
- Language: Latin, Spanish
- Origin: 17th century Banda Oriental
- Official website: iglesiacatolica.org.uy

The Catholic Church in Uruguay is part of the worldwide Catholic Church, under the spiritual leadership of the pope.

== Overview ==
Religion in Uruguay (2014)
1. Catholicism (38.0%)
2. Protestantism (7.00%)
3. None (41.0%)
4. Others (15.0%)

In 2014, Catholics made up a minority of the population at 38%, second to the unaffiliated group, which came in at 41%.

There are 9 dioceses and the archdiocese of Montevideo; the ordinaries gather in the Episcopal Conference of Uruguay. The current archbishop is Daniel Sturla, who was appointed on 11 February 2014.

The patron saint of Uruguay is Our Lady of the Thirty-Three, venerated at the Cathedral Basilica of Florida.

== History ==
Evangelization of Uruguay followed Spanish settlement in 1624. Montevideo became a diocese in 1878, after its establishment as a Vicarate in 1830. Missionaries followed the reduction pattern of gathering natives into communities, training them in agriculture, husbandry, and other arts, while forming them in the Faith.

The constitution of 1830 made Catholicism the state religion and subsidized missions to natives. In 1878, Montevideo was elevated to Diocese and, in 1897, to Archdiocese.

The constitution of 1917 enacted separation of Church and state, in a manner which is radically more secular than most other Latin American or Western countries. The religious holidays of Christmas and Holy Week were maintained as holidays, but their names were changed to Day of the Family and Tourism Week.

In a 2026 press conference organised by Aid to the Church in Need, ahead of Pope Leo XIV's visit to the country, Cardinal Daniel Sturla, of Montevideo, described the Church in Urugay as "poor and free, small and beautiful”.

Two Eastern Catholic churches are also present in Uruguay, the Armenian Catholic Church and the Maronite Church.

== Careers ==
Uruguay is a country where religious calling is low. Every year, some young people engage in religious careers. In 2013, there were 34 students at the Archdiocesan Seminary in Montevideo.

== Saints ==
So far, there is one Uruguayan saint and one blessed, but several beatification processes are open:

- Saint Francesca Rubatto
- Blessed Jacinto Vera
- Servant of God Rubén Isidro Alonso
- Servant of God Walter Chango
- Servant of God Salvador García Pintos
- Blessed Consuelo Aguiar-Mella y Díaz
- Blessed Dolores Aguiar-Mella y Díaz

== Institutes of Consecrated life ==
Several religious orders are present in Uruguay. Some of them arrived in colonial times (although their presence was intermittent during the first centuries):

- Order of Friars Minor Capuchin, since 1624
- Order of Preachers, since 1660
- Society of Jesus, 1680–1757, 1842-1859 and since 1872

After Uruguay was established as an independent country, several other religious orders established their own missions in Uruguay:

- Conventual Franciscans
- Betharram Fathers, since 1856
- Salesians of Don Bosco, since 1877
- Sisters of Adoration of the Blessed Sacrament of the Immaculate Heart of Mary, since 1885
- Sisters of Christian Charity, since 1885
- Pallottine Fathers, since 1886
- Brothers of the Holy Family of Belley, since 1889
- Congregation of the Mission, since 1892
- Capuchin Sisters of Mother Rubatto, since 1892
- Claretians, since 1896
- Oblates of St. Francis de Sales, since 1896
- Discalced Carmelites, since 1912
- Dominican Sisters of the Annunciation of the Blessed Virgin, since 1913
- Sons of Divine Providence, since 1921
- Maronite Order of the Blessed Virgin Mary, since 1924
- Missionary Oblates of Mary Immaculate, since 1929.
- Augustinians, since 1932
- Marist Brothers, since 1934
- Brothers of the Sacred Heart, since 1935
- Dehonians, since 1940
- Passionists, since 1940
- Brothers of Christian Instruction, since 1951
- Religious of Jesus and Mary, since 1952
- Christian Brothers, since 1955
- Opus Dei, since 1956
- Sisters Hospitaller of the Sacred Heart of Jesus, since 1961
- Scalabrinians, since 1970
- Missionaries of Charity, since 1991
- Visitandines
- Brothers of Mercy of Our Lady of Perpetual Help
- Poor Servants of Divine Providence
- Salesian Sisters of Don Bosco

== Notable Uruguayan Catholic religious leaders ==
- Dámaso Antonio Larrañaga (1771–1848), naturalist and first Apostolic Vicar of Uruguay
- Juan Francisco Larrobla (1775–1842), theologian and patriot, writer of the Declaration of the Independence
- José Benito Monterroso (1780–1838), secretary of the national hero José Artigas
- José Benito Lamas (1787–1857), patriot and lecturer
- Manuel Barreiro (1787–1838), patriot and constituent
- Lorenzo Antonio Fernández (1792–1852), constituent and rector of the University
- Servant of God Jacinto Vera (1813–1881), first Bishop of Montevideo
- Blessed Francisca Rubatto (1844–1905), founder of the Capuchin Sisters of Mother Rubatto
- Mariano Soler (1846–1908), first Archbishop of Montevideo
- Antonio María Barbieri, OFM Cap (1892–1979), first Uruguayan cardinal
- Juan Luis Segundo, SJ (1925–1996), liberation theologian
- Servant of God Rubén Isidro Alonso, SDB (1929–1992), streetwise priest
- Daniel Sturla, SDB (born 1959), second Uruguayan cardinal and current archbishop of Montevideo
- Gonzalo Aemilius (born 1978), principal of the Liceo Jubilar

== See also ==
- Religion in Uruguay
- Episcopal Conference of Uruguay
- List of Catholic dioceses in Uruguay
- List of Uruguayan Catholic priests

== Bibliography ==
- Berrutti, Sergio (2026). El papa en el “reino laico”. De las históricas visitas de Juan Pablo II en los años 80, a la de León XIV. Montevideo: Ediciones de la Plaza.
