= Canelones =

Canelones may refer to:

- Canelones, Uruguay, capital of its eponymous municipality and department
- Municipality of Canelones
- Canelones Department
- Roman Catholic Diocese of Canelones, established in 1961
