= Pedro Ignacio Wolcan Olano =

His Excellency Pedro Ignacio Wolcan Olano
- Bishop of Tacuarembó
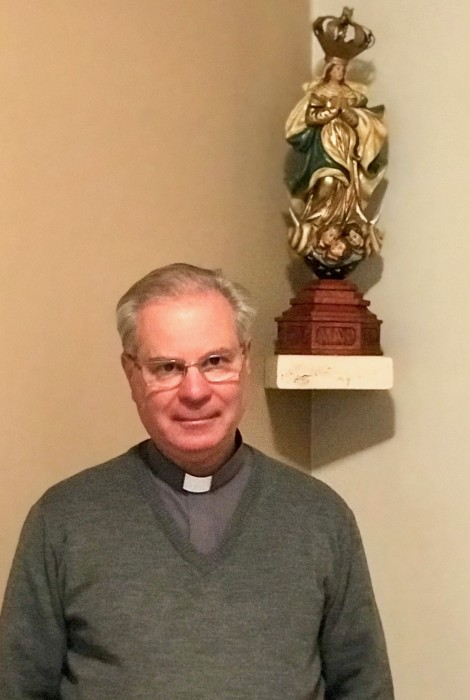
- Father Pedro Ignacio Wolcan Olano
- Church: Roman Catholic Church
- Archdiocese: Montevideo
- Diocese: Tacuarembó
- In office: June 19, 2018
- Predecessor: Julio César Bonino
- Previous post: Vicar general in Mercedes

Orders
- Ordination: September 21, 1986

Personal details
- Born: October 21, 1953 (age 72) Nueva Helvecia
- Coat of arms

Styles of Pedro Ignacio Wolcan Olano
- Reference style: The Most Reverend
- Spoken style: Your Excellency
- Religious style: Monsignor
- Posthumous style: none

Pedro Ignacio Wolcan Olano is from June 19, 2018 the bishop of Tacuarembó.

== Biography ==
Pedro Wolcan was born in Nueva Helvecia in 1953, and studied in the interdiocesan major seminary of Montevideo and was ordained priest on September 21, 1986, being incardinated in the diocese of Mercedes.

From 1986 to 1991 he was priest of the cathedral. In 2005 he became parish priest of Santísima Trinidad and, in 2006, parish priest of Nuestra Señora del Carmen.

Since 2015 he was vicar general of the diocese. On June 19, 2018 he was nominated bishop of Tacuarembó. He was ordained bishop in the Cathedral of Tacuarembó on the following 12 August by bishop Carlos María Collazzi Irazábal.

Catholic Church titles
Preceded by Julio César Bonino	Tacuarembó; June 19, 2018 – incumbent	Succeeded by
