= Heriberto Bodeant =

Uruguayan Roman Catholic bishop

The Most Reverend Heriberto Andrés Bodeant Fernández
- Bishop of Melo
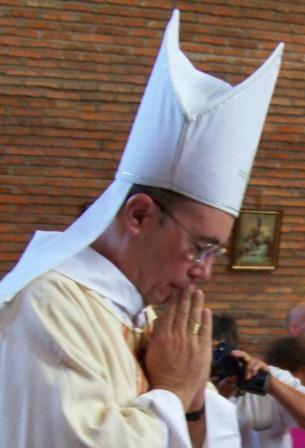
- Church: Roman Catholic Church
- Diocese: Melo
- See: Melo
- Appointed: 13 June 2009
- Installed: 18 July 2009
- Predecessor: Luis del Castillo Estrada
- Previous posts: Titular Bishop of Ampora (2003–09); Auxiliary Bishop of Salto (2003–09); Secretary General of the Uruguayan Episcopal Conference (2013–16)

Orders
- Ordination: 27 September 1986 by Carlos Alberto Nicolini
- Consecration: 27 September 2003 by Daniel Gil Zorrilla

Personal details
- Born: Heriberto Andrés Bodeant Fernández; 15 June 1955 Young, Uruguay
- Motto: Nada es imposible para Dios ("Nothing is impossible for God")

Heriberto Andrés Bodeant Fernández (born 15 June 1955) is a Uruguayan Roman Catholic cleric.

== Biography ==
Bodeant was born in Young, where he attended school and high school. After studying education in Paysandú, he worked in public education from 1975 to 1979, in his hometown.

In 1980 he entered the inter-diocesan seminary "Christ the King" in Montevideo, Uruguay. He studied philosophy and theology at the Theological Institute of Uruguay and obtained his degree in theology. He was ordained a priest on September 27, 1986, at the Church of the Sacred Heart of Jesus (Spanish: parroquia Sagrado Corazón de Jesús) by the Coadjutor Bishop of Salto, Carlos Alberto Nicolini.

He served as curate of the parish of Nuestra Señora del Pilar (Our Lady of the Pillar) in Fray Bentos between 1986 and 1988. After his appointment as diocesan advisor on Youth Ministry in 1988, he lived in Paysandú in the parish of San José Obrero (Saint Joseph the Worker). From 1990 to 1992 he studied at the theology faculty of the Catholic Institute in Lyon, France, from where he obtained a further degree in theology. On his return to Uruguay he taught at the Theological Institute of Uruguay and at the Catholic University of Paysandú. In 1993 he was made parish priest of Sagrado Corazón de Jesús in Paysandú.

On 28 June 2003 he was appointed titular bishop of Ampora and auxiliary bishop of Salto. His was consecrated as bishop in Salto Cathedral on 27 September of that year by the Bishop of Salto, Daniel Gil Zorrilla, with the Bishop Emeritus of Salto, Marcelo Mendiharat, and the President of the Episcopal Conference of Uruguay, Carlos Collazzi, Bishop of Mercedes, attending as co-consecrators.

He was appointed Bishop of Melo on 13 June 2009, due to the illness of the ordinary Luis del Castillo. He assumed pastoral leadership of the diocese on 18 July of that year.

In the Episcopal Conference of Uruguay he has served as president for two terms (2004–2009) of the National Commission for Youth Ministry and the Department for Vocations and Ministry. In 2009 he was elected as General Secretary of the Conference for the period 2010–2012, and was reelected in 2012 for the period 2013–2016. In this capacity he participated in the 33rd General Assembly of the Latin American Episcopal Conference (Spanish: Consejo Episcopal Latinoamericano, better known as CELAM), the first to take place in Montevideo, in May 2011.

He was appointed and installed as Bishop of Canelones in 2021.
