= Juanicó =

- Town
- Location within Uruguay
- Coordinates: 34°36′0″S 56°15′0″W
- Country: Uruguay
- Department: Canelones
- Municipality: Canelones
- Established: 1830
- Founder: Francisco Juanicó
- Elevation: 44 m (144 ft)

Population (2011)
  - Total: 1,305
- Time zone: UTC -3
- Postal code: 90400
- Dial plan: +598 433 (+5 digits)

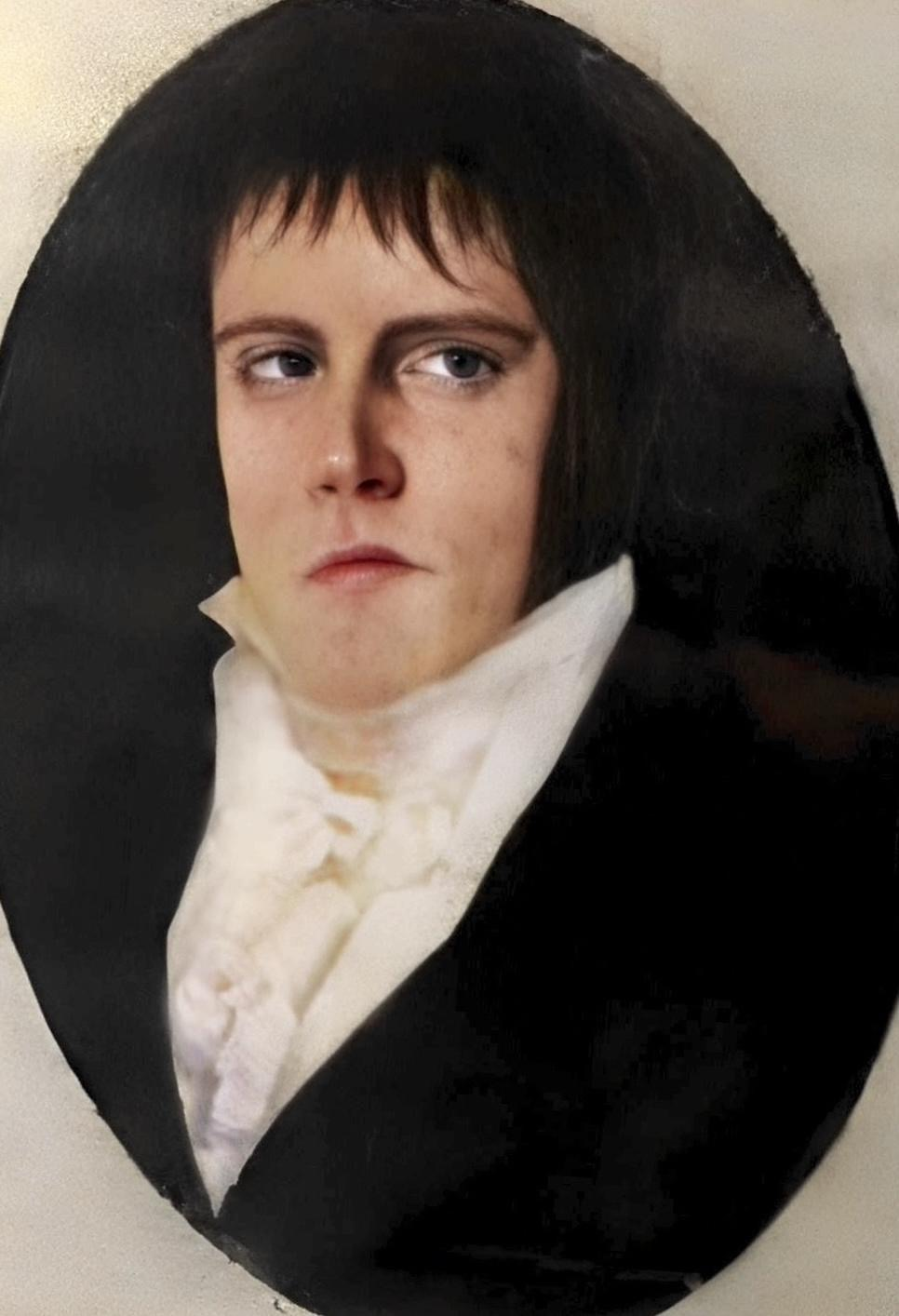
Retrato de Francisco Juanicó

Juanicó is a small industrial town located 35 km north of Montevideo, within the Canelones Department, Uruguay.

== Location ==
The town is located just east of Route 5, about 8 kilometres (5.0 mi) south of the city of Canelones. The railroad tracks Montevideo - 25 de Agosto pass through the town.

== History ==
The town owes its current denomination to Francisco Juanicó, who, in 1830, finished with cattle raising. He then built up a winery who enabled him to produce high-quality wine, mainly due to the favorable conditions of the land.

On 19 November 2002, the status of the populated centre was elevated to "Villa" (town) by the Act of Ley Nº 17.587.

== Population ==
In 2011 Juanicó had a population of 1,305.

Year	Population
1963	550
1975	662
1985	664
1996	662
2004	1,256
2011	1,305

Source: Instituto Nacional de Estadística de Uruguay

== Places of worship ==
- St. Thérèse of Lisieux Parish Church (Roman Catholic)
