= Cathedral of Mercedes, Uruguay =

Cultural heritage monument of Uruguay

Coordinates: 33.2488°S 58.0301°W

Catedral de Nuestra Señora de las Mercedes
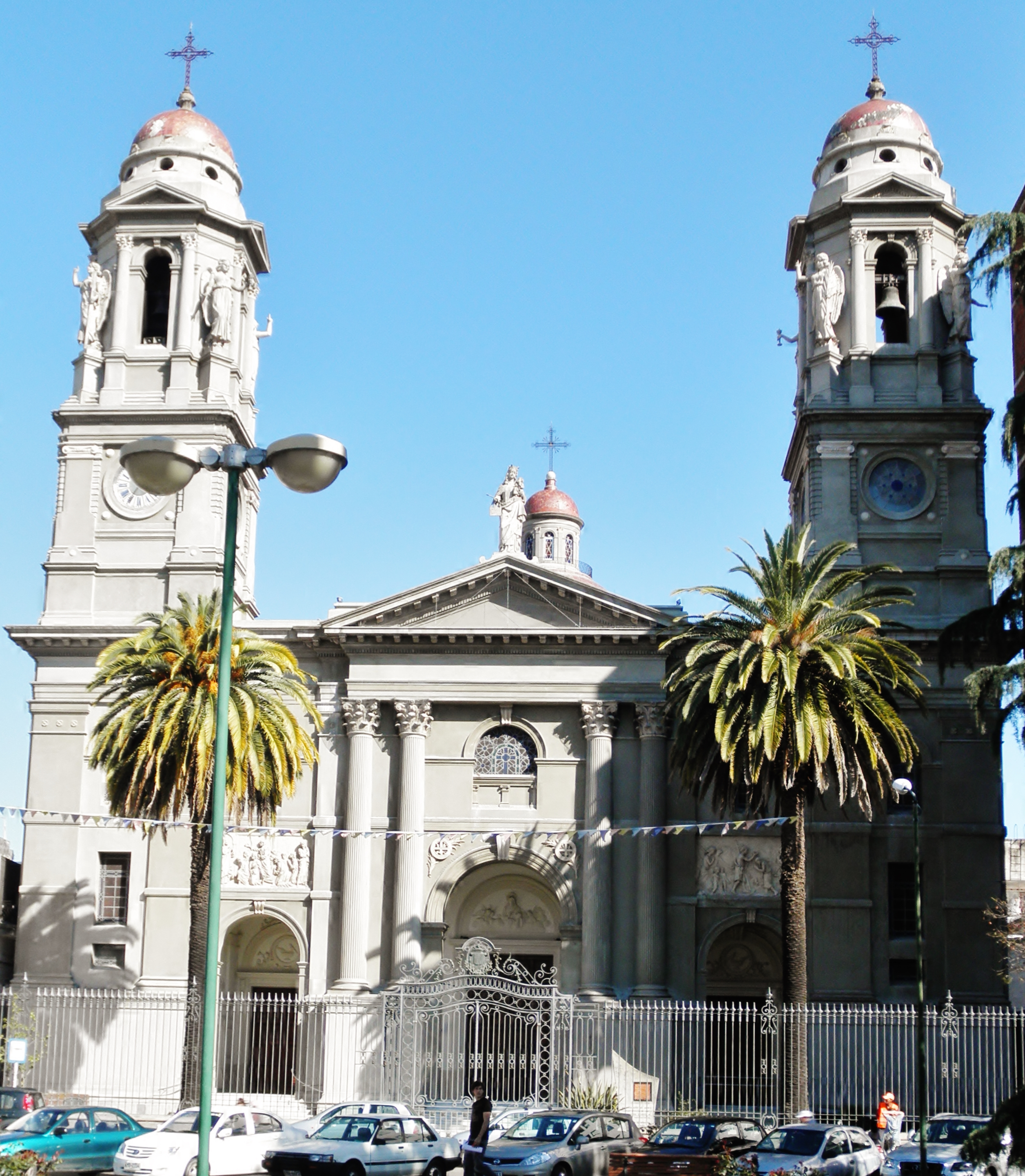

Religion
- Affiliation: Roman Catholic
- Diocese: Diocese of Mercedes
- Year consecrated: 1867

Location
- Location: Mercedes, Uruguay
- Interactive map of Catedral de Nuestra Señora de las Mercedes

Architecture
- Architect: Antonio Petrochi
- Style: Neoclassicism

The Cathedral of Our Lady of Mercy (Spanish: Catedral de Nuestra Señora de las Mercedes) is the main Roman Catholic church building of Mercedes, Uruguay. It is the see of the Roman Catholic Diocese of Mercedes since 1960.

== History ==
Built in Neoclassical style with design of Swiss architect Antonio Petrochi, it was consecrated in 1867. It is dedicated to Our Lady of Mercy.

On the occasion of the celebrations of the bicentennial of 2011, the cathedral was refurbished, thanks to donations.

== Same devotion ==
There are other churches in Uruguay dedicated to Our Lady of Mercy, for instance:

- Parish Church of Our Lady of Mercy and St. Jude Taddhaeus in Villa Muñoz, Montevideo
- Charity Chapel, Hospital Maciel, Montevideo
- Our Lady of Mercy Chapel in Garzón

== See also ==
- List of Roman Catholic cathedrals in Uruguay
- Roman Catholic Diocese of Mercedes
