= Marcelo Mendiharat Pommies =

French clergyman and auxiliary bishop

- Bishop of Salto
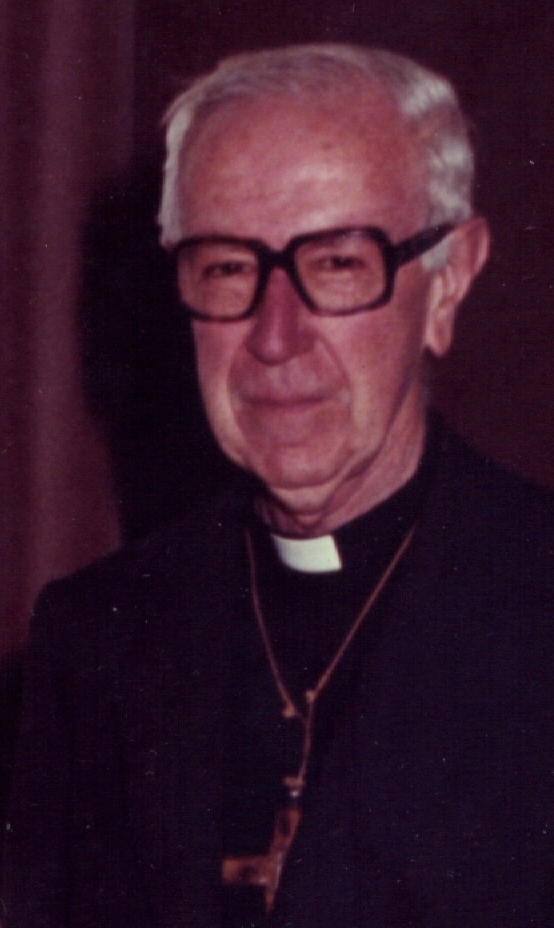
- Church: Catholic Church
- Diocese: Diocese of Salto
- In office: 1 January 1968 – 8 March 1989
- Predecessor: Alfredo Viola
- Successor: Daniel Gil Zorrilla
- Previous posts: Titular Bishop of Zerta (1959-1968); Coadjutor Bishop of Salto (1959-1968)

Orders
- Ordination: 22 July 1945
- Consecration: 18 May 1959 by Alfredo Viola

Personal details
- Born: 2 May 1914 Ostabat-Asme, Basses-Pyrénées, France
- Died: 12 June 2007 (aged 93) Montevideo, Uruguay

Marcelo Mendiharat Pommies (2 May 1914, in Ostabat-Asme – 12 June 2007, in Montevideo) was a French clergyman and auxiliary bishop and later bishop for the Roman Catholic Diocese of Salto, Uruguay. He emigrated with his family to Uruguay in 1931.

He became ordained on 22 July 1945. He was appointed titular bishop of Zerta on 3 February 1959, and was consecrated that year on 18 May. He became coadjutor and succeeded on 1 January 1968. He retired on 8 March 1989, and died on 12 June 2007.

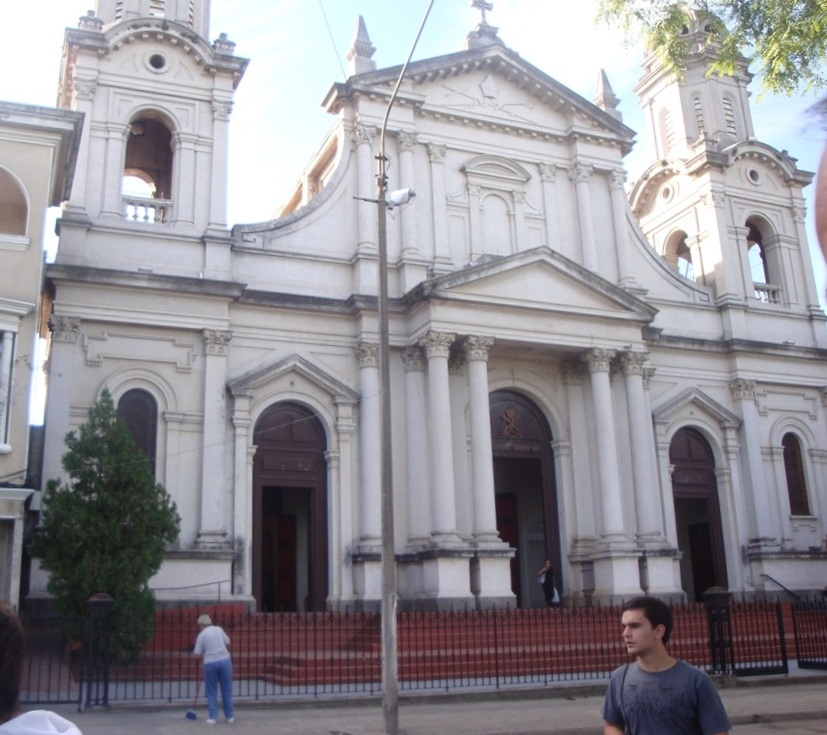
Cathedral of St. John the Baptist, see of the Diocese of Salto
