= Roman Catholic Diocese of Mercedes =

Roman Catholic diocese in Uruguay

Diocese of Mercedes Dioecesis Mercedaniana Diócesis de Mercedes

Catholic

Location
- Country: Uruguay
- Ecclesiastical province: Montevideo

Statistics
- Area: 15,000 km^{2} (5,800 sq mi)
- Population: Total; Catholics: (as of 2004); 210,000; 170,000 (81%)
- Parishes: 16

Information
- Denomination: Catholic Church
- Sui iuris church: Latin Church
- Rite: Roman Rite
- Established: 17 December 1960 (65 years ago)
- Cathedral: Catedral Nuestra Señora de las Mercedes

Current leadership
- Pope: Leo XIV
- Bishop: Luis Eduardo González Cedrés
- Bishops emeritus: Carlos María Collazzi Irazábal, S.D.B.

Map
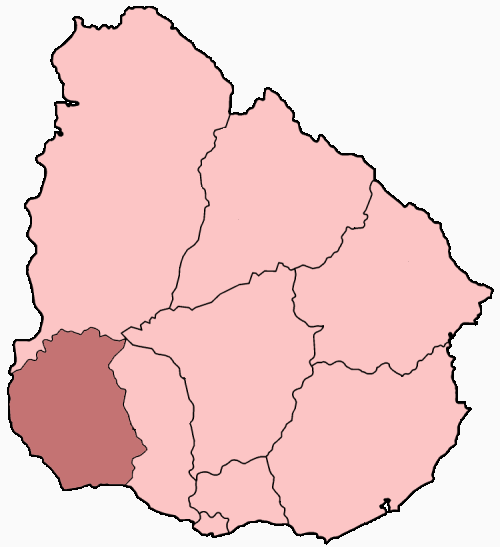

The Diocese of Mercedes (Latin: Dioecesis Mercedaniana) is a Latin Church ecclesiastical territory or diocese of the Catholic church in Uruguay.

== History ==
The diocese was erected in 1960, from parts of both the Diocese of Salto and the Diocese of San José de Mayo. The diocese is a suffragan of the Archdiocese of Montevideo. Its see is at the Cathedral of Mercedes.

The current bishop is Luis Eduardo González Cedrés, who was appointed in 2023.

== Bishops ==
=== Ordinaries ===
- Enrico Lorenzo Cabrera Urdangarin † (31 Dec 1960 Appointed – 23 May 1974 Died)
- Andrés María Rubio Garcia, S.D.B. † (22 May 1975 Appointed – 14 Feb 1995 Resigned)
- Carlos María Collazzi Irazábal, S.D.B. (14 Feb 1995 Appointed – 26 Sep 2023 Retired)
- Luis Eduardo González Cedrés (26 Sep 2023 Appointed – Present)

=== Auxiliary bishop ===
- José Gottardi Cristelli, S.D.B. † (1972–1975), appointed Auxiliary Bishop of Montevideo

=== Other priest of this diocese who became bishop ===
- Pedro Ignacio Wolcan Olano, appointed Bishop of Tacuarembó in 2018

== See also ==
- List of churches in the Diocese of Mercedes
- List of Roman Catholic dioceses in Uruguay
