= Robert Joseph Hermann =

Catholic bishop

His Excellency, The Most Reverend Robert Joseph Hermann
- Auxiliary Bishop Emeritus of Saint Louis; Titular Bishop of Zerta
- Church: Roman Catholic Church
- Archdiocese: St. Louis
- Appointed: October 16, 2002
- Installed: December 12, 2002
- Retired: December 1, 2010
- Other post: Titular Bishop of Zerta

Orders
- Ordination: March 30, 1963 by Joseph Ritter
- Consecration: December 12, 2002 by Justin Francis Rigali, Joseph Fred Naumann, and Timothy Michael Dolan

Personal details
- Born: August 12, 1934 (age 92) Weingarten, Missouri, US
- Motto: Fiat voluntas tua (Thy will be done)

Styles of Robert Joseph Hermann
- Reference style: His Excellency; The Most Reverend
- Spoken style: Your Excellency
- Religious style: Bishop

Robert Joseph Hermann (born August 12, 1934) is an American prelate of the Roman Catholic Church. He served as an auxiliary bishop of the Archdiocese of St. Louis in Missouri from 2002 to 2010.

== Biography ==
=== Early life ===
Robert Hermann was born on August 12, 1934, in Weingarten, Missouri. As a child, he was a member of Our Lady Help of Christians Parish in Weingarten. He entered St. Preparatory Seminary in St. Louis, Missouri, in 1955, followed by Kenrick Seminary in St. Louis in 1963. Hermann graduated with a Bachelor of Philosophy degree from Cardinal Glennon College in St. Louis.

=== Priesthood ===
Hermann was ordained into the priesthood in St. Louis by Cardinal Joseph Ritter for the Archdiocese of Saint Louis on March 30, 1963. After his ordination, Hermann had the following part time assignments in parishes in Eastern Missouri while teaching in church schools:

- Assistant pastor, Our Lady Help of Christians in Bonnots Mill, Missouri, in 1963
- Assistant pastor, St. Catherine of Siena in Pagedale, Missouri from 1963 to 1964
- Assistant pastor, St. Cronan in St. Louis from 1964 to 1968. During this period, he studied at St. Louis University, receiving a Bachelor of Arts degree in English in 1966. He started teaching in 1967 at St. Louis Preparatory Seminary-North, working there for the next 12 years.
- Associate pastor, Holy Ghost in Berkeley, Missouri from 1968 to 1972
- Associate pastor. Holy Cross in Baden, Missouri, from 1972 to 1976
- Associate pastor, Most Holy Trinity in St. Louis from 1976 to 1979

In 1979, Hermann was appointed director of the Catholic Charismatic Renewal for the archdiocese, serving in that role until 1982. During the same period, he served as associate pastor of St. Pius X Parish in Glasgow Village, Missouri. In 1982, Hermann was named supervisor of the Acolyte Internship Program for Kenrick Seminary and as pastor of St. Andrew Parish in Lemay, Missouri. Hermann left St. Andrew in 1988 to become pastor of Incarnate Word Parish in Chesterfield, Missouri, serving there until 2002.

In 1996, Hermann was named as dean of the Northwest Deanery in the archdiocese. He became chair of the Agency Review Task Force in 2000. He was appointed as vicar general in 2002.

=== Auxiliary Bishop of St. Louis ===
Hermann was appointed by Pope John Paul II on October 16, 2002, as an auxiliary bishop of Saint Louis. He was consecrated on December 12, 2002, in St. Louis at the Cathedral Basilica of Saint Louis by Archbishop Justin Rigali.

At the Fall 2008 meeting of the US Conference of Catholic Bishops, Hermann remarked that he was willing to die if it would bring about the end of abortion rights for women.

The archdiocesan consultors elected Hermann as archdiocesan administrator until April 21, 2009, when Bishop Robert Carlson was named archbishop and led the archdiocese as apostolic administrator in concert with Archbishop-elect Carlson until his installation on June 10, 2009. Hermann supervised the parishes in five deaneries: Northeast St. Louis County, Northwest St. Louis County, Festus, St. Charles County and Washington. His responsibilities also included Catholic education, stewardship and development, and several other agencies and ministries.

On December 1, 2010, Pope Benedict XVI accepted Hermann's letter of resignation as auxiliary bishop of St. Louis. After his retirement, Hermann served as spiritual director of Kenrick-Glennon Seminary.

Catholic Church titles
Preceded by –	Auxiliary Bishop of St. Louis; 2002–2010	Succeeded by –
Unknown	Chair, Agency Review Task Force, St Louis; 2000–2002	Unknown
Unknown	Dean, Northwest Deanery, St Louis; 1996–2002	Succeeded by Rev. John J. Leykam VF
Unknown	Supervisor, Acolyte Internship Program for Kenrick Seminary; 1982–2001	Unknown
Unknown	Director, Catholic Charismatic Renewal; 1979–1982	Unknown
