= Diocese of Tacuarembó =

Roman Catholic diocese in Uruguay

Diocese of Tacuarembó Dioecesis Tacuarembiana Diócesis de Tacuarembó

Catholic
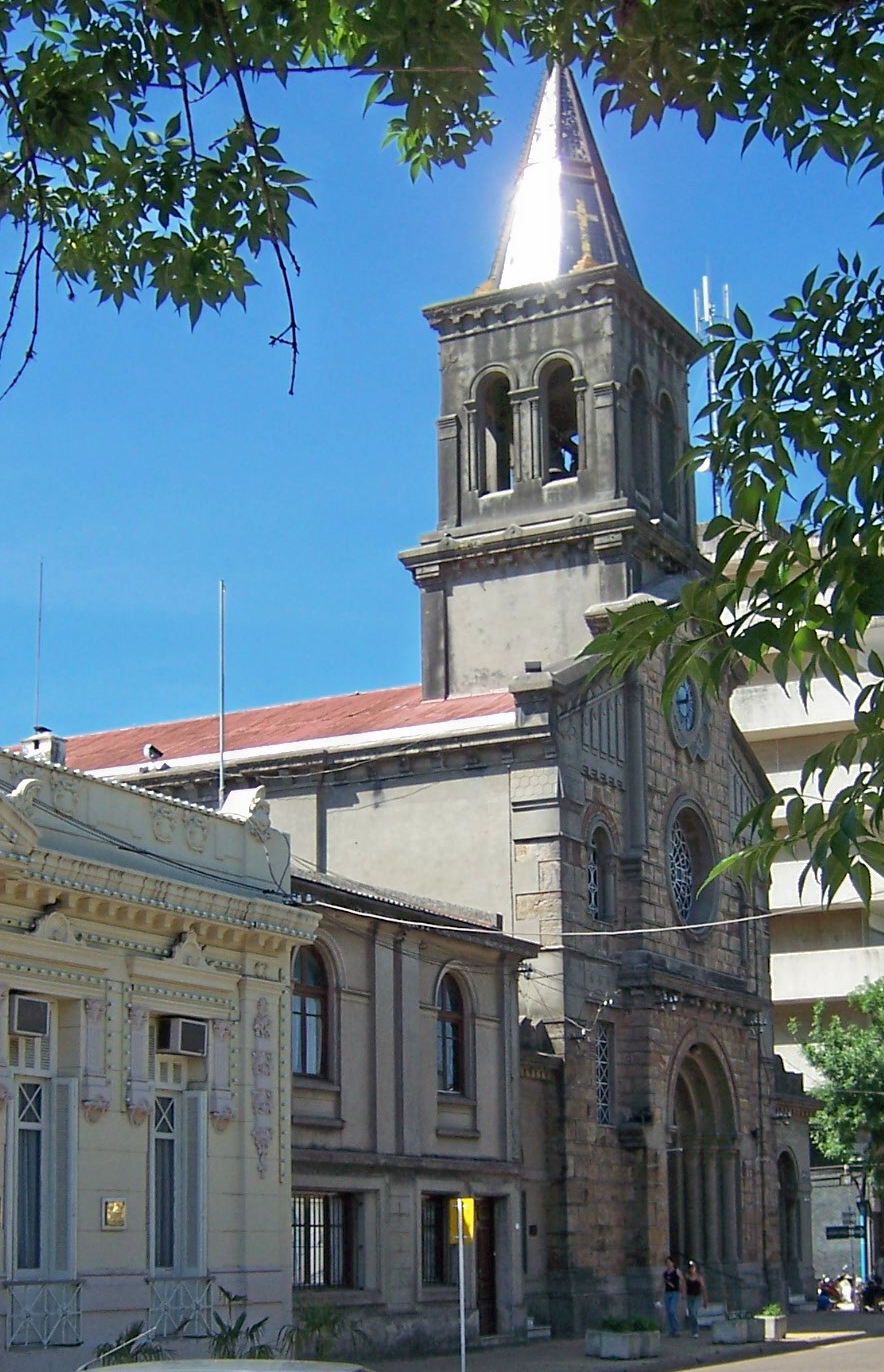
- Cathedral in Tacuarembó

Location
- Country: Uruguay
- Ecclesiastical province: Montevideo

Statistics
- Area: 24,808 km^{2} (9,578 sq mi)
- Population: Total; Catholics: (as of 2010); 196,000; 98,500 (50.3%)
- Parishes: 16

Information
- Denomination: Catholic Church
- Sui iuris church: Latin Church
- Rite: Roman Rite
- Established: 22 October 1960 (66 years ago)
- Cathedral: Catedral de San Fructuoso

Current leadership
- Pope: Leo XIV
- Bishop: Pedro Ignacio Wolcan Olano

Map
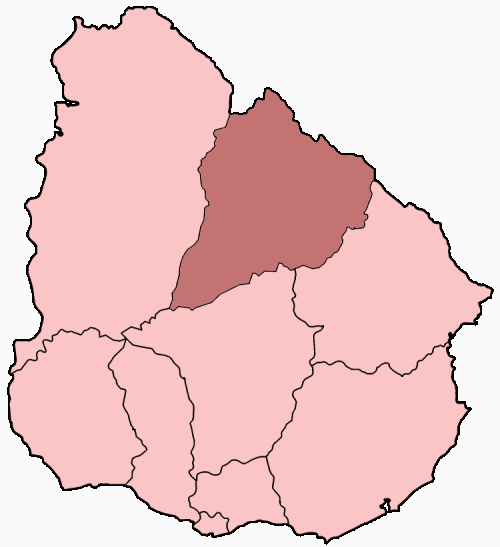

The Diocese of Tacuarembó (Latin: Dioecesis Tacuarembiana) is a Latin Church ecclesiastical territory or diocese of the Catholic Church in Uruguay. It is a suffragan diocese in the ecclesiastical province (covering all Uruguay) of the metropolitan Archdiocese of Montevideo.

== History ==
The diocese was created in 1960, from the Diocese of Florida and is a suffragan of the Archdiocese of Montevideo. It covers the Departments of Tacuarembó and Rivera. Its see is at the Cathedral of Tacuarembó.

== Ordinaries ==
- Carlos Parteli Keller † (3 Nov 1960 Appointed – 26 February 1966 Appointed, Coadjutor Archbishop of Montevideo)
- Miguel Balaguer † (26 Feb 1966 Appointed – 28 January 1983 Resigned)
- Daniel Gil Zorrilla, S.J. (28 Jan 1983 Appointed – 8 March 1989 Appointed, Bishop of Salto)
- Julio César Bonino † (20 Dec 1989 Appointed – 8 August 2017 Died in office)
- Pedro Ignacio Wolcan Olano, (from 19 June 2018)

== See also ==
- List of churches in the Diocese of Tacuarembó
- List of Roman Catholic dioceses in Uruguay
