= Cathedral of Our Lady of Guadalupe (Canelones) =

Cathedral in Canelones, Uruguay

Coordinates: 34.5249°S 56.2821°W

Catedral de Nuestra Señora de Guadalupe
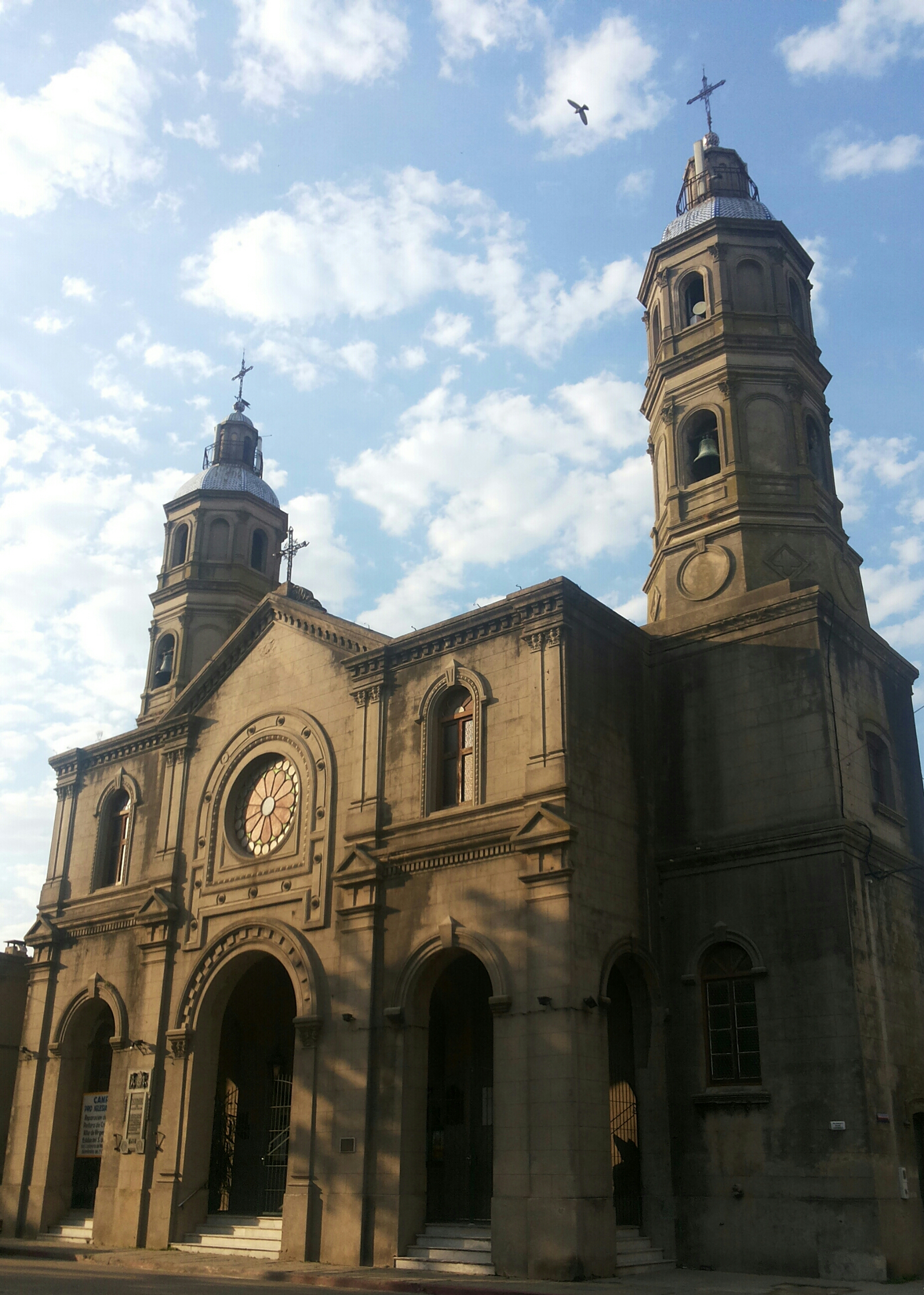

Religion
- Affiliation: Roman Catholic
- Diocese: Diocese of Canelones
- Year consecrated: 1843

Location
- Location: José Enrique Rodó esq. José Batlle y Ordóñez; Canelones, Uruguay
- Interactive map of Catedral de Nuestra Señora de Guadalupe

Website
- Cathedral of Canelones

The Cathedral of Our Lady of Guadalupe (Spanish: Catedral de Nuestra Señora de Guadalupe) is the main Roman Catholic church building of Canelones, Uruguay. It is the see of the Roman Catholic Diocese of Canelones since 1961.

== History ==
The first temple was built in 1775; around the small church, a township evolved. In 1828, the priest Juan Francisco Larrobla blessed here the first Flag of Uruguay.

The current building was completed in 1843, and it was expanded later. Since 1900 it has a mechanical organ. It is dedicated to the Virgin of Guadalupe, which was also the original denomination of the city, Villa Nuestra Señora de Guadalupe.

In 1945, Cardinal Antonio María Barbieri elevated the church to National Sanctuary of the Virgin of Guadalupe.

== See also ==
- List of Roman Catholic cathedrals in Uruguay
- Roman Catholic Diocese of Canelones

== Bibliography ==
- Juan José Villegas Mañé. Historia de la parroquia Nuestra Señora de Guadalupe de Canelones, 1775-1977, en La Iglesia en el Uruguay. Estudios históricos, Cuadernos del ITU, Nº 4, Instituto Teológico del Uruguay, Montevideo, 1978.
