= James Kavanagh (bishop) =

Irish priest and sociologist

- Born: 1914; Dublin
- Died: 2002 (aged 87–88)

Academic background
- Education: University College Dublin, University of Oxford, University of Cambridge

Academic work
- Discipline: Sociology

Bishop James Kavanagh BA STL Dip Ecom Sci, MA(Hons) (1914-2002), was an Irish priest and professor, who served as Auxiliary Bishop in the Dublin Catholic Archdiocese from 1973 until 1991.

== Early life ==
Kavanagh was born in Dublin in 1914 where he went St. Laurence's Primary School followed by O'Connell School. He went to Clonliffe College to study for the priesthood. While at Clonliffe, he completed his undergraduate degree in Philosophy at University College Dublin.

At school he played hurling for O'Connell's, and played for the Dublin Minor Hurling side. At Cambridge, he played soccer at inter-varsity level, and he was involved in Home Farm football club in Dublin, serving as Vice-president of the club. In later life he played golf, sponsoring the annual priests' golf shield in Portmarnock.

== Career ==
In 1939 he was ordained a priest in a ceremony in St. Patrick's College, Maynooth, and graduated with a STL and went on to teach Philosophy in St. Patrick's Missionary College, Kiltegan.

He served for a period as Army Chaplin, as a curate in Crumlin and Westland Row, Dublin. He was then sent by the Bishop to study Economics and Politics in Campion Hall, Oxford University. On returning, he was appointed by Archbishop John Charles McQuaid as first director of the Dublin Institute of Adult Education in 1951. In 1954 he went to Cambridge University where he completed a Masters in Economics in 1956 and returned to lecture in University College Dublin.

He was appointed Auxiliary Bishop to the Roman Catholic Archdiocese of Dublin in 1973, (and Titular bishop of Zerta). He served as parish priest in the Church of the Holy Child, Whitehall/Larkhill, Dublin, from 1976 until 1980.

In 1977 he successfully intervened at the request of the families and trade union movement with Provisional IRA prisoners in the Curragh Military Hospital who were on Hunger Strike. He also spoke out and lent his name to campaigns for the release of the Birmingham Six, Guilford Four and Nicky Kelly.

He retired in 1991.

== Personal life ==
Kavanagh died in Sybil Hill nursing home in 2002. His younger brother Fr. Mark Kavanagh (1926-2014) was a Columban missionary priest.

== Honours ==
The Central Catholic Library in Merrion Square, Dublin, holds Dr. Kavanaghs collection of books he donated to it, and its Kavanagh Room is named after him.

== Publications ==
- Manual of Social Ethics by Dr. James Kavanagh, Gil, 1954.
