= Arturo Fajardo =

Uruguayan Roman Catholic cleric

Arturo Eduardo Fajardo Bustamante
- Bishop of Salto
- See: Salto
- Appointed: June 15, 2020
- Predecessor: Fernando Miguel Gil Eisner
- Previous post: Bishop of San José de Mayo (2007-2020)

Orders
- Ordination: May 8, 1988 by Pope John Paul II
- Consecration: September 8, 2007 by Januariusz Mikołaj Bolonek

Personal details
- Born: July 17, 1961 Aiguá, Uruguay
- Denomination: Roman Catholic
- Residence: Maldonado

Arturo Eduardo Fajardo Bustamante (born 17 July 1961 in Aiguá, Maldonado Department) is a Uruguayan Roman Catholic cleric.

== Biography ==
Fajardo completed attended public schools and the Liceo Militar General Artigas. He later spent one year as an officer cadet at the Military School in Toledo.

He was ordained priest on 8 May 1988 by Pope John Paul II during his second visit to Uruguay.

He was appointed Bishop of San José de Mayo on 27 June 2007.

Since 2013 he is the Vice President of the Episcopal Conference of Uruguay.

In April 2019, he was elected as President of the Episcopal Conference, and on 15 June 2020, Pope Francis appointed him as Bishop of Salto.
