= Cathedral of Salto =

Roman Catholic church building in Salto, Uruguay

Coordinates: 31.3888°S 57.9595°W

Catedral Basílica de San Juan Bautista de Salto
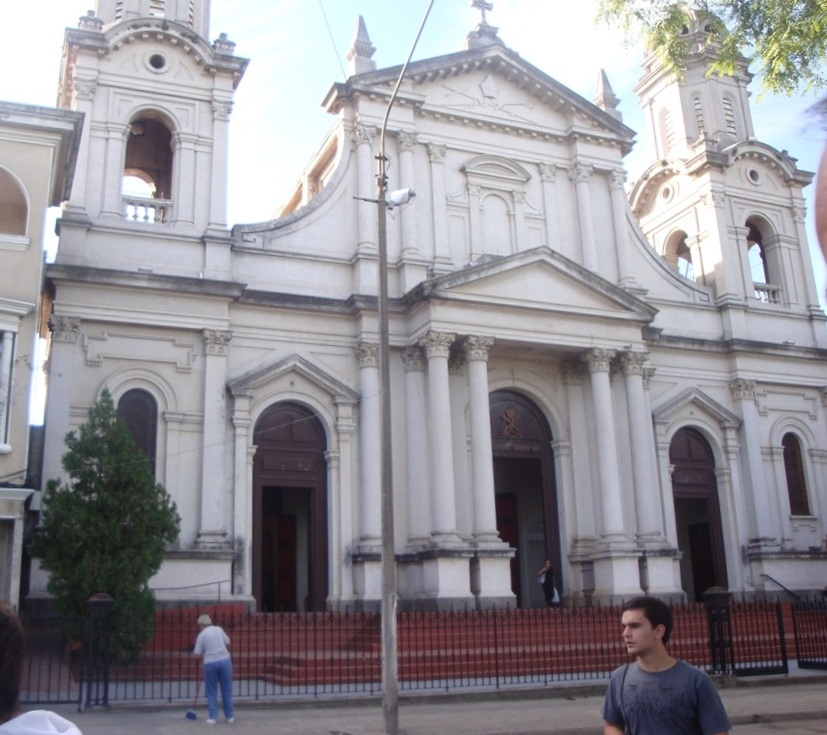

Religion
- Affiliation: Roman Catholic
- Diocese: Diocese of Salto
- Year consecrated: 1889

Location
- Location: Salto, Uruguay
- Interactive map of Catedral Basílica de San Juan Bautista de Salto

Architecture
- Architect: Ernesto Vespignani
- Style: Eclecticism

The Cathedral Basilica of Saint John the Baptist (Spanish: Catedral Basílica de San Juan Bautista) is the main Roman Catholic church building of Salto. It is the see of the Roman Catholic Diocese of Salto since 1939.

== History ==
Designed by the Salesian Ernesto Vespignani, the style of the cathedral is Eclecticism, with a predominantly Baroque façade. It was consecrated in 1889, dedicated to St. John the Baptist. In its interior stands out several paintings by Zorrilla de San Martín and the Christ in bronze by Edmundo Pratti.

On 9 May 1988, Pope John Paul II visited the cathedral.

On 8 April 1997, the cathedral was declared a basilica minor.

== Same devotion ==
There are other churches in Uruguay dedicated to St. John the Baptist:

- St. John the Baptist Parish Church in Pocitos, Montevideo
- St. John the Baptist Parish Church in Santa Lucía
- St. John the Baptist Parish Church in San Bautista
- St. John the Baptist Parish Church in Río Branco
- St. John the Baptist Parish Church in Mercedes
- St. John the Baptist Chapel in Ismael Cortinas

== See also ==
- List of Roman Catholic cathedrals in Uruguay
- Roman Catholic Diocese of Salto
