= San Juan Bautista, Montevideo =

Roman Catholic parish church in Montevideo, Uruguay

Iglesia de San Juan Bautista (Pocitos)
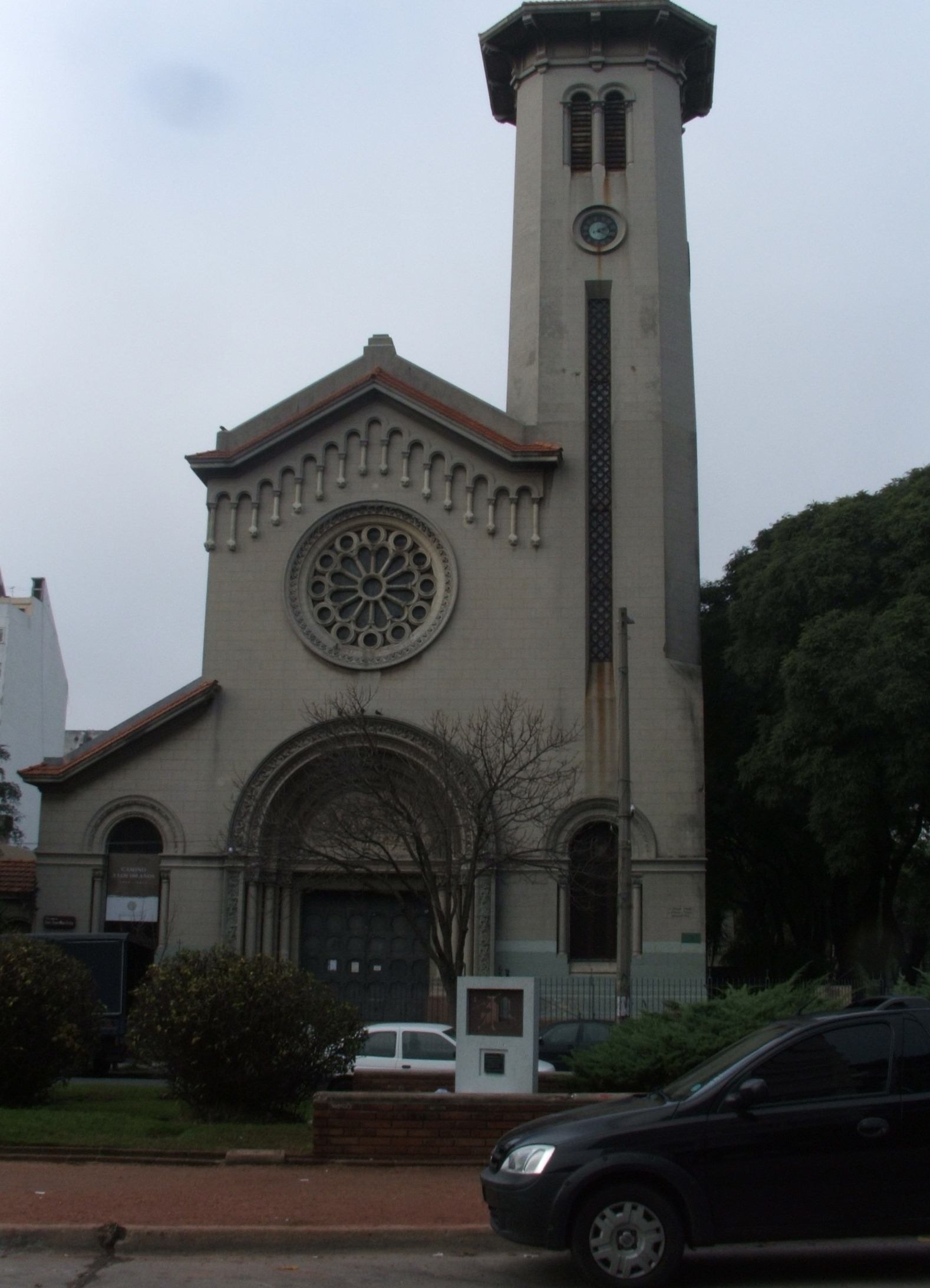

Religion
- Affiliation: Roman Catholic
- Ecclesiastical or organizational status: Parish church

Location
- Location: Mons. Domingo Tamburini 1210; Montevideo, Uruguay
- Interactive map of Iglesia de San Juan Bautista (Pocitos)

Architecture
- Type: Church
- Style: Neo-Romanesque

The Church of Saint John the Baptist (Spanish: Iglesia de San Juan Bautista), popularly known also as Iglesia de Pocitos (due to its location in the neighbourhood of Pocitos) is a Roman Catholic parish church in Montevideo, Uruguay.

== History ==
Originally there was a small chapel near the beach. In 1890 is purchased the plot where a better temple was to be built. Finally, on 25 June 1899 is laid the fundamental stone of the present temple, which is dedicated to saint John the Baptist. The construction took decades; the decisive boost was given by the priest Domingo Tamburini, appointed parish priest in 1925.

This church is an important landmark in its neighbourhood and a very popular wedding venue. The Montevideo Philharmonic Orchestra holds concerts here during its seasons.

== Same devotion ==
There are other churches in Uruguay dedicated to St. John the Baptist:

- Cathedral Basilica of St. John the Baptist in Salto
- St. John the Baptist Parish Church in Santa Lucía
- St. John the Baptist Parish Church in San Bautista
- St. John the Baptist Parish Church in Río Branco
- St. John the Baptist Parish Church in Mercedes
- St. John the Baptist Chapel in Ismael Cortinas
