= Capilla de la Caridad del Hospital Maciel, Montevideo =

Church

Coordinates: 34°54′29.2″S 56°12′42″W

Capilla de la Caridad
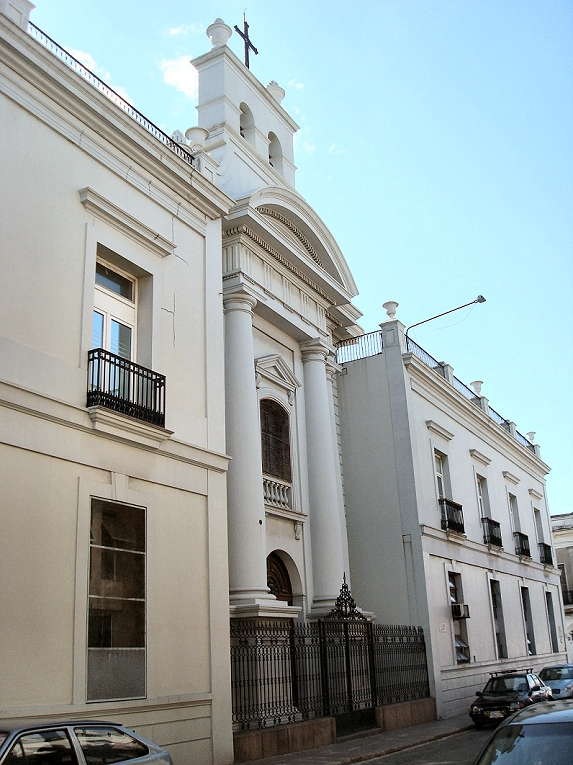

Religion
- Affiliation: Roman Catholic
- Ecclesiastical or organizational status: Hospital chapel
- Year consecrated: 1807

Location
- Location: Montevideo, Uruguay
- Interactive map of Capilla de la Caridad

Architecture
- Style: Neo-Classicism

The Charity Chapel (Spanish: Capilla de la Caridad), better known as Capilla del Hospital Maciel, is a Roman Catholic chapel in Montevideo, Uruguay.

== Overview ==
Run by the Sisters Hospitaller of the Sacred Heart of Jesus, it is part of the Maciel Hospital.

The images venerated are: Our Lady of Mercy (main altar), Our Lady of Mount Carmel, Our Lady of the Rosary, Our Lady of Sorrows, Christ, Saint Anthony, Saint Francis of Paola, and Saint Eligius (patron saint of the metalworkers, who donated the image). The baptismal fonts are made of giant tridacna valves.

In 1825 the Chapel was visited by Count Giovanni Maria Mastai-Ferretti, the future Pope Pius IX.

== Bibliography ==
- Guía Arquitectónica y Urbanística de Montevideo. 3rd Edition. Intendencia Municipal de Montevideo, 2008, ISBN 978-9974-60026-3, p. 51, 132.
