= Benedict Menni =

Italian Roman Catholic saint

Saint Benedict Menni OH
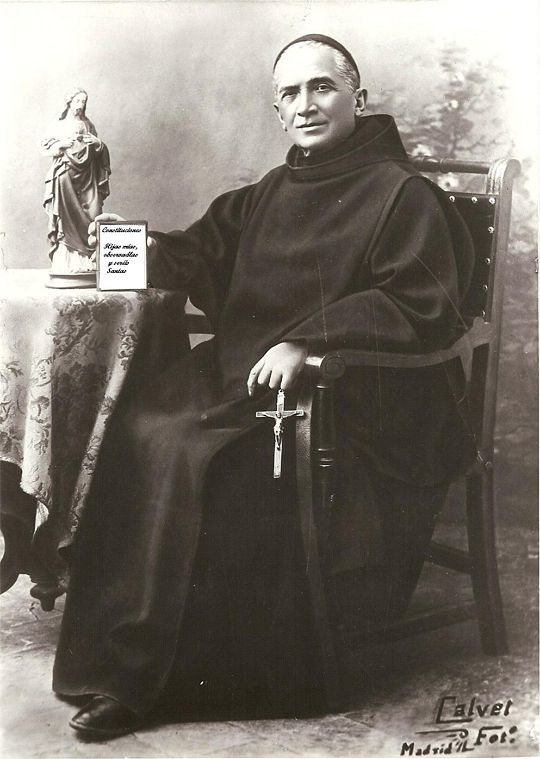
- c. 1905.
- Born: Angelo Ercole Menni Figini; 11 March 1841; Milan, Kingdom of Lombardy–Venetia
- Died: 24 April 1914 (aged 73); Dinan, Côtes-d’Armor, French Third Republic
- Venerated in: Catholic Church
- Beatified: 23 June 1985, Saint Peter's Square, Vatican City by Pope John Paul II
- Canonized: 21 November 1999, Saint Peter's Square, Vatican City by Pope John Paul II
- Feast: 24 April
- Attributes: Priest's cassock; Crucifix
- Patronage: Sisters Hospitaller of the Sacred Heart of Jesus; People with mental health issues; The sick; Volunteers

Benedict Menni, OH (11 March 1841 – 24 April 1914), born Angelo Ercole Menni Figini, was an Italian Roman Catholic priest. Menni was a professed member of the Order of the Brothers Hospitallers of Saint John of God and he went on to establish a religious congregation of women known as the Sisters Hospitaller of the Sacred Heart of Jesus, whose ministry was based upon that of his own order.

Menni worked for the elderly and those who were abandoned. He also worked and aided victims of polio and those with mental health problems. As part of his pastoral mission, he worked in Spain.

He was canonized in 1999 after the recognition of two miracles attributed to his intercession. His order continues to flourish across the world in locations such as Spain and Italy.

== Life ==
Angelo Ercole Menni Figini was born as the fifth of fifteen children to Luigi Menni and Luisa Figini on 11 March 1841 in Milan. He was baptized hours after he was born. As a child he was noted for his strength of spirit and for his intellectual abilities.

His religious calling came when he was an adolescent. At the time he had a position at a bank and was faced with a request to falsify records. He refused and resigned his post. This gave him the opportunity to pursue his spiritual vocation. In 1858 Piedmontese and French troops confronted Austrian troops outside of Milan, and Menni volunteered to work as a stretcher-bearer to assist soldiers wounded at the battle of Magenta, transporting the wounded from Milan railway station to the nearby hospital. This brought him into contact with the Hospitallers of Saint John of God; he entered their novitiate in 1860 and took his vows as a member in 1864.

He undertook his studies in philosophy and theology in Lodi and later in Rome. Upon their conclusion he was ordained to the priesthood in 1866, after which he assumed the name of "Benedict". At the behest of Pope Pius IX - in 1867 - he started the restoration of the Saint John of God order in both Spain and Portugal, a restoration needed because of a situation of political strife.

After settling in Spain he began by setting up a children's hospital in Barcelona in 1867 and this marked the first of his several undertakings. A short time later Menni attracted numerous followers to his cause and this allowed him to establish new institutions of his new order on a rapid scale, not only in Spain but also in Portugal and Mexico. The 1868 deposition of Queen Isabella II set off renewed persecution and Menni - chosen as the Superior of the order in 1872 - found himself the object of constant threats. To recover from an illness he moved to Marseille but later returned to Spain to help the victims of the Third Carlist War.

Arriving in Granada in 1878, he met two women - María Josefa Recio and María Angustias Giménez - who in 1881 set up a women's hospital. Their work inspired Menni to establish a new women's congregation and accordingly on 31 May 1881 he founded in Madrid the Sisters Hospitaller of the Sacred Heart of Jesus. Pope Leo XIII granted the Decree of Praise in 1892 and in 1901 his formal approval to the new congregation. This looked to the example of Saint John of God as it set forth on its mission to provide care to all people. However, the sisters' task was not a simple one; for instance one patient killed one of the nuns in 1883. Menni established around seventeen mental hospitals in Spain.

It was in 1890 that he began to reform the order in Portugal and instituted several hospitals and a home for priests in Lisbon. He participated in the General Chapter of the Order in Rome in 1905 and returned to Spain afterwards.

He was accused of violence against a patient who suffered from dementia and faced a criminal court in Madrid. He refused legal representation but relented at the behest of the Bishop of Madrid. Reports of the case also reached Rome and as a result Menni decided to resign as Superior General on 20 June 1912.

In his final years he suffered a stroke and developed dementia. Given these health problems, and knowing his end was not far off, he asked to spend the remainder of his life at Dinan in France, where he died on 24 April 1914. His remains were taken to Spain, after his triumphant funeral, to the mother house of the order.

== Beatification process ==
The beatification process for Menni was formally opened on 23 December 1947, and he was given the title Servant of God. The canonization process commenced under Pope Paul VI in Spain on 26 February 1964. As was the usual manner, after the gathering of documentation and testimonies, the cause was granted formal ratification and allowed to proceed to the subsequent phases, including the compilation of an extensive large dossier to be sent to the Congregation for the Causes of Saints in Rome for further evaluation.

On 11 May 1982, on the advice of the Congregation, Pope John Paul II approved a declaration that Menni had lived a life of heroic virtue and proclaimed him to be Venerable.

The miracle required for his beatification was investigated in a diocesan tribunal and its validity ratified on 3 December 1982. All documentation was sent to Rome and John Paul II approved the miracle on 14 December 1984 and on 23 June 1985 presided over the beatification at St Peter's in Rome. The second miracle needed for sainthood was investigated in the same manner as the first and was ratified in 1998. The pope approved the miracle on 26 March 1999 and canonized him on 21 November 1999.

Pope Leo XIV sees Menni as one of several saints who, during their lives, "discovered that the poorest are not only objects of our compassion, but teachers of the Gospel. It is not a question of 'bringing' God to them, but of encountering [God] among them".
