= Julio César Bonino =

Uruguayan Roman Catholic bishop

Julio César Bonino Bonino
- Bishop of Tacuarembó
- Church: Catholic Church
- Diocese: Diocese of Tacuarembó
- In office: 20 December 1989 – 8 August 2017
- Predecessor: Daniel Gil Zorrilla
- Successor: Pedro Ignacio Wolcan Olano

Orders
- Ordination: 26 May 1974
- Consecration: 18 March 1990 by Orestes Nuti

Personal details
- Born: 2 February 1947 Santa Lucía, Canelones Department, Uruguay
- Died: 8 August 2017 (aged 70) Tacuarembó, Tacuarembó Department, Uruguay
- Coat of arms

Julio César Bonino Bonino (2 February 1947 – 8 August 2017) was a Roman Catholic bishop.

Ordained to the priesthood in 1974, Bonino served as bishop of the Roman Catholic Diocese of Tacuarembó, Uruguay, from 1989 until his death.

== Notes ==
Catholic Church titles
Preceded by Daniel Gil Zorrilla, S.J.	Tacuarembó; 20 Dec 1989 – 8 August 2017	Succeeded by Pedro Ignacio Wolcan Olano
