= Cathedral of San José de Mayo =

Cathedral in San José de Mayo, Uruguay

Coordinates: 34°20′25″S 56°42′48″W

Catedral Basílica de San José
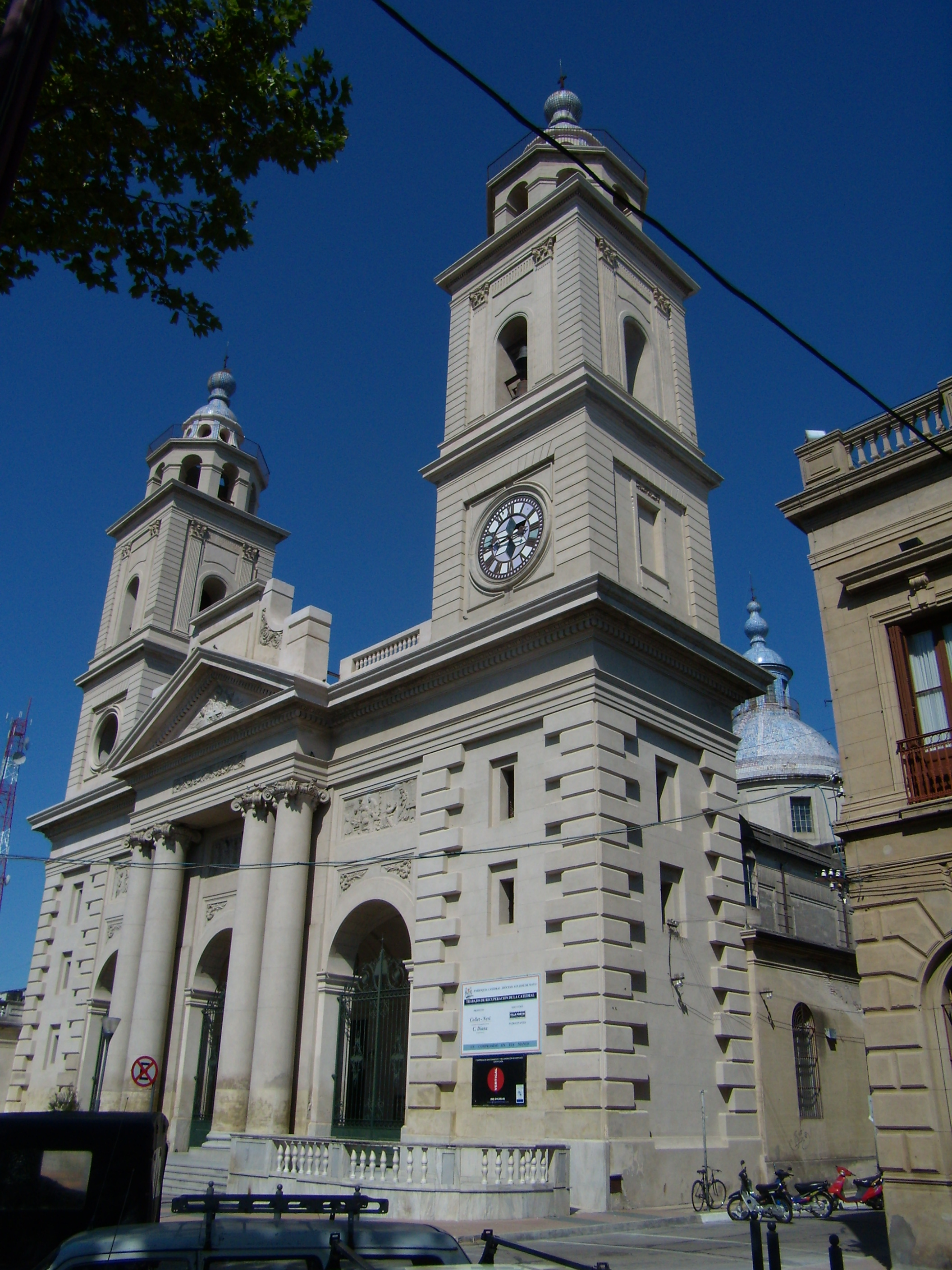

Religion
- Affiliation: Roman Catholic
- Diocese: Diocese of San José de Mayo
- Year consecrated: 1874

Location
- Location: San José de Mayo, Uruguay
- Interactive map of Catedral Basílica de San José

Architecture
- Architect: Antonio Fongivell
- Type: basilica

The Cathedral Basilica of Saint Joseph (Spanish: Catedral Basílica de San José) is the main Roman Catholic church building of San José de Mayo, Uruguay. It is the see of the Roman Catholic Diocese of San José de Mayo since 1955.

The construction started in 1857, with design of the Catalan master Antonio Fongivell. It was consecrated in 1874, dedicated to saint Joseph. In 1957 it was declared basilica minor and, that same year, National Sanctuary of Saint Joseph.

== See also ==
- List of Roman Catholic cathedrals in Uruguay
- Roman Catholic Diocese of San José de Mayo
