= Fernando Miguel Gil Eisner =

Uruguayan Roman Catholic bishop (1953–2020)

- Bishop of Salto
- Church: Catholic Church
- Diocese: Diocese of Salto
- In office: 24 July 2018 – 17 January 2020
- Predecessor: Pablo Galimberti
- Successor: Arturo Fajardo

Orders
- Ordination: 25 March 1983
- Consecration: 23 September 2018 by Daniel Sturla

Personal details
- Born: 8 May 1953 Montevideo, Uruguay
- Died: 17 January 2020 (aged 66) Salto, Uruguay

Fernando Miguel Gil Eisner (8 May 1953 – 17 January 2020) was a Uruguayan Roman Catholic bishop.

Gil Eisner was born in Uruguay and was ordained to the priesthood in 1983. He served as bishop of the Roman Catholic Diocese of Salto, Uruguay, from 2018 until his death in 2020.
