= Weingarten, Missouri =

Unincorporated community in Missouri, U.S.

- unincorporated community
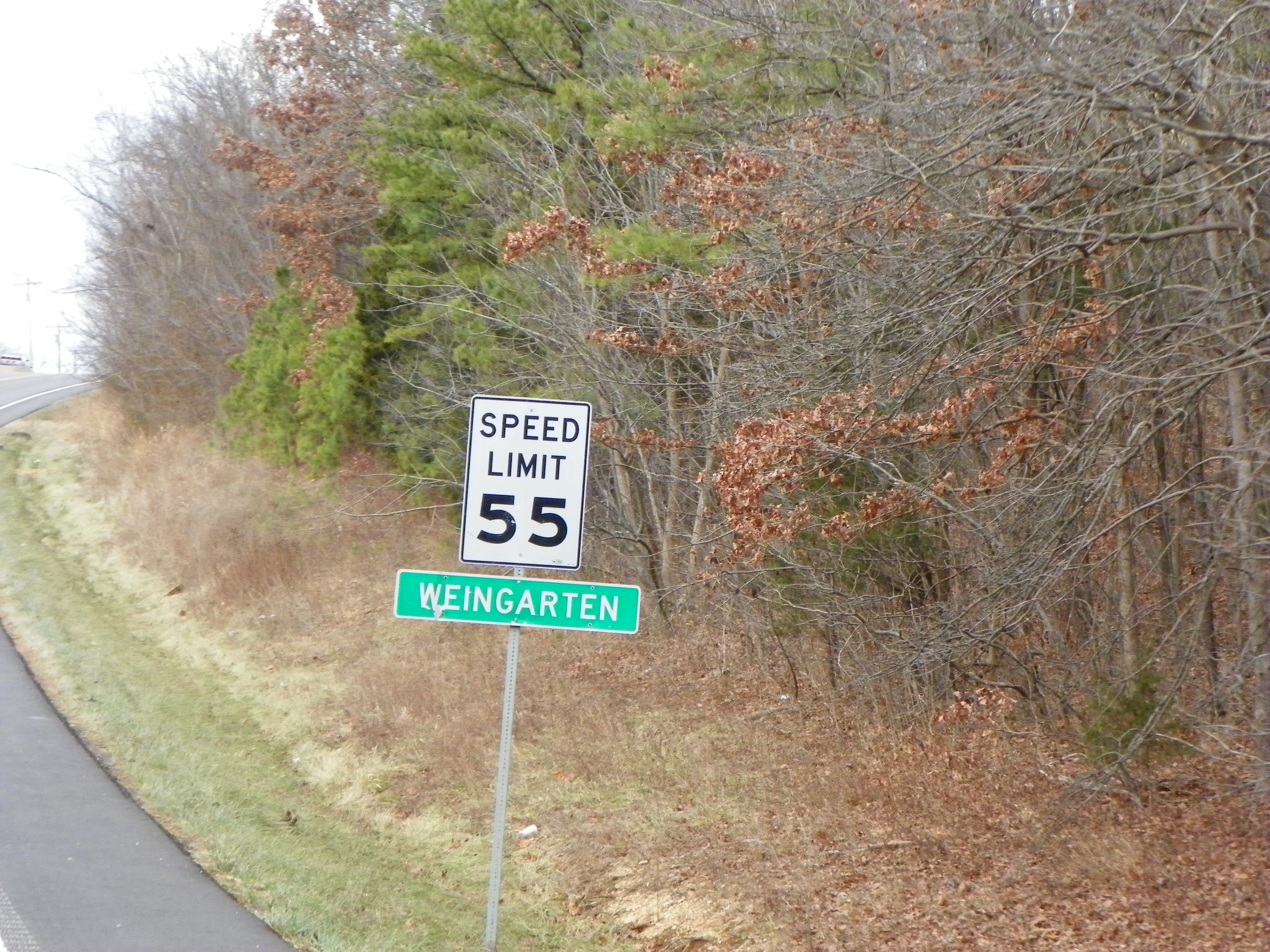
- Weingarten, Missouri road sign

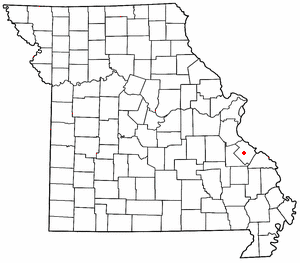
- Location of Ste. Genevieve County, Missouri
- Coordinates: 37°53′22″N 90°13′02″W
- Country: United States
- State: Missouri
- County: Sainte Genevieve

Area
  - Total: 1.05 sq mi (2.72 km^{2})
  - Land: 1.05 sq mi (2.72 km^{2})
  - Water: 0 sq mi (0.00 km^{2})
- Elevation: 804 ft (245 m)

Population (2020)
  - Total: 127
  - Density: 120.9/sq mi (46.68/km^{2})
- FIPS code: 29-78226
- GNIS feature ID: 2587120

Weingarten is an unincorporated community and census-designated place in Sainte Genevieve County, Missouri, United States. As of the 2020 census, Weingarten had a population of 127.

== Name ==
Weingarten (German: vineyard) was named after the German town by the same name located in Württemberg, Germany. In the past the community was also known by the nickname Plank Road.

== History ==
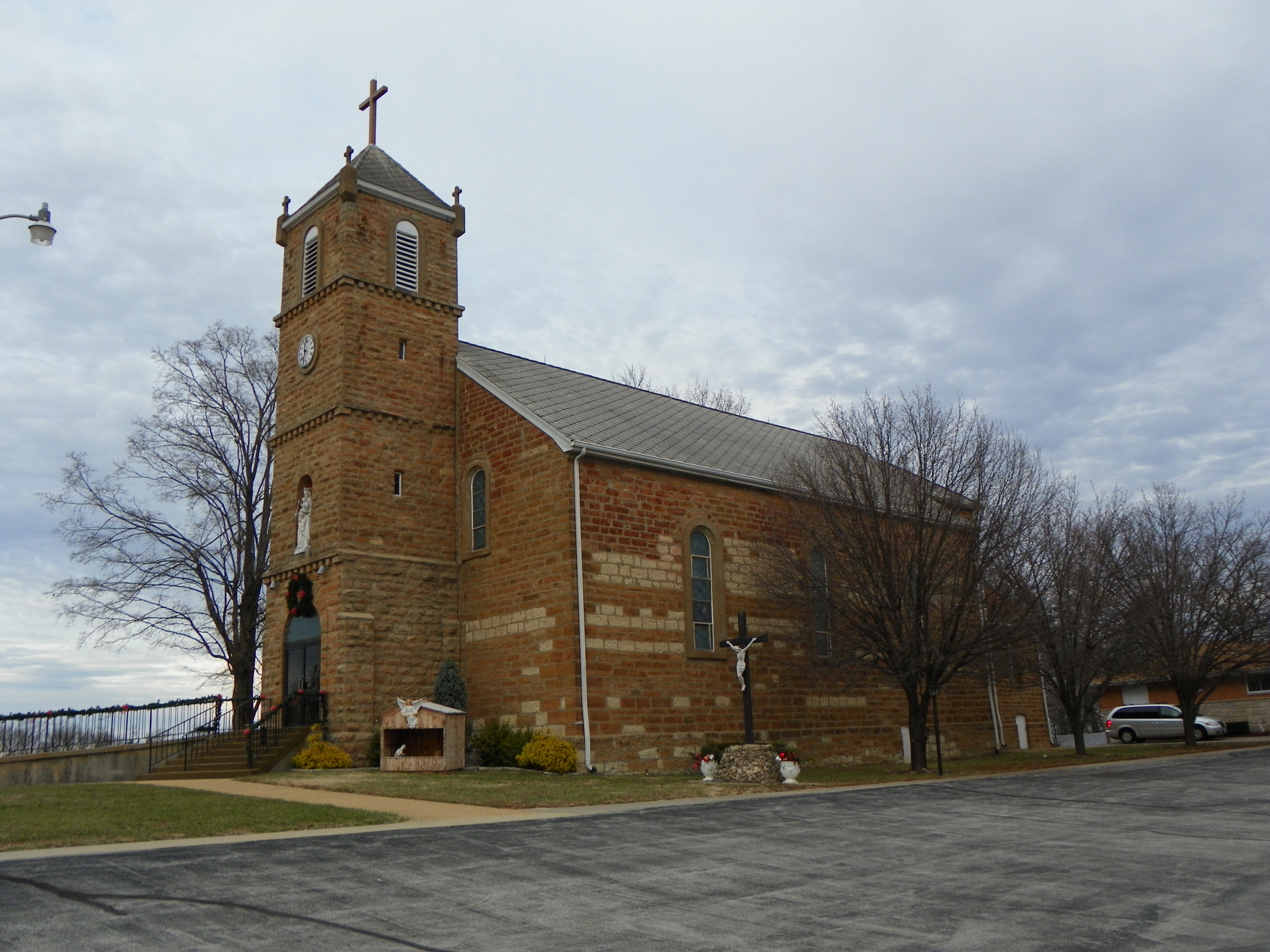
Our Lady Help of Christians Roman Catholic Church

Weingarten was founded in 1837 by Jacob Wolf. A post office was opened in 1887 with Seraphin B. Donze serving as its first postmaster. The community was named by postmaster Donze after the hometown of his parents in the German state of Wurttemberg. Vineyards and wineries are found nearby, and this region is known for its great beauty. Nearby is the old Cornwall Mines, which was a source of copper, and also Hawn State Park.

The Catholic Church in Weingarten dates from 1872. The statue of the Virgin in the niche above the door was installed in 1903. The stonework of this little church is made up of a mixture of local stone, which appear nicely cut.

The invocation to Our Lady, Auxilium Christianorum, is found in the Litany of Loreto, and is related to the victory of the Christian fleet at the Battle of Lepanto. Pope Pius VII vas imprisoned by the Emperor Napoleon. After his release, he instituted the feast of Our Lady Help of Christians, in thanksgiving to God and the Blessed Virgin Mary.

According to the Archdiocese's 2009 Status Animarum, this parish has approximately 455 Catholics. According to the United States Census of the year 2000, the most common ancestries in the township around Weingarten are German, French, and Irish.

Most Reverend Robert Joseph Hermann, Auxiliary Bishop of Saint Louis, is from Weingarten, and attended this church.

Weingarten was the location of a large prisoner of war camp during the Second World War, with about 5000 Italian soldiers being held there. During the camp's existence, two prisoners escaped but were quickly recaptured, and five died in captivity. The prisoners were hired out to local farmers for 80 cents per day. Little evidence of the camp remains today.

== Geography ==
Weingarten is located approximately thirteen miles southwest of Sainte Genevieve, on Route 32.

== Demographics ==
Historical population
Census	Pop.	Note	%±
2020	127		—
U.S. Decennial Census

== Notable person ==
Robert Joseph Hermann - Auxiliary Bishop Emeritus of St. Louis

== See also ==
- Missouri wine
