= Juan Francisco Larrobla =

Uruguayan Roman catholic cleric (1775 - 1842)

Juan Francisco de Larrobla Pereyra (Montevideo, 9 January 1775 - Canelones, 5 July 1842) was a Uruguayan Roman Catholic cleric, theologian and patriot.

== Biography ==
Larrobla studied at the Real Colegio de San Carlos in Buenos Aires and afterwards theology at the University of Córdoba. He was ordained priest shortly before 1800 and served in the Banda Oriental. Although a royalist, soon he had a feeling for the patriots.

On 25 August 1825 he presided over the House of Representatives of the Oriental Province, an assembly of patriots which approved three Laws:

- Law of Independence (from the Empire of Brazil)
- Law of Union (with the United Provinces of the River Plate)
- Law of the National Flag

He was also involved in the improvement and expansion of the Church of Our Lady of Guadalupe in Canelones.

== Family ==
His eldest sister Jacoba was mother of priest Lorenzo Antonio Fernández.

His youngest brother Luis de la Robla was the first postmaster of independent Uruguay.
