= Diocese of Salto =

Latin Catholic ecclesiastical territory in Uruguay

Diocese of Salto Dioecesis Saltensis in Uruguay Diócesis de Salto

Catholic
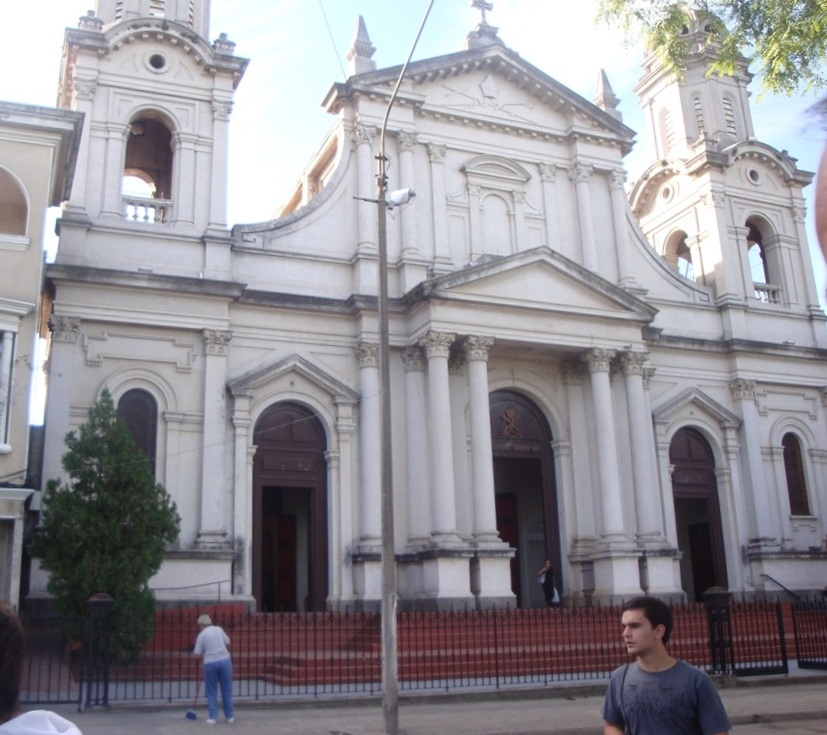
- Cathedral of St. John the Baptist

Location
- Country: Uruguay
- Ecclesiastical province: Montevideo

Statistics
- Area: 49,295 km^{2} (19,033 sq mi)
- Population: Total; Catholics: (as of 2010); 379,595; 288,000 (75.9%)
- Parishes: 16

Information
- Denomination: Catholic Church
- Sui iuris church: Latin Church
- Rite: Roman Rite
- Established: 14 April 1897 (129 years ago)
- Cathedral: Catedral de San Juan Bautista

Current leadership
- Pope: Leo XIV
- Bishop: Arturo Fajardo
- Bishops emeritus: Pablo Jaime Galimberti di Vietri

Map
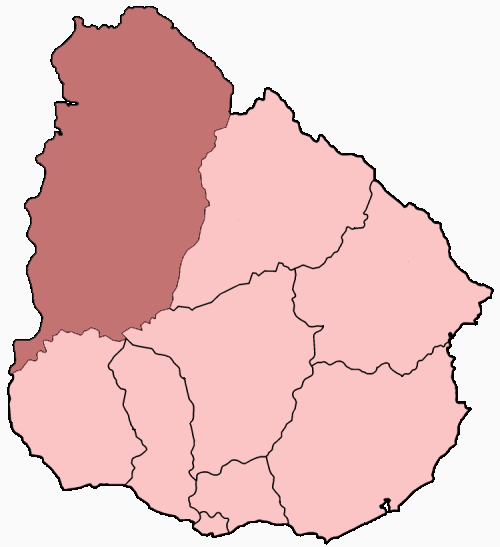

The Diocese of Salto is a Latin Church ecclesiastical territory or diocese of the Catholic Church in Uruguay. The diocese was erected in 1897. The Diocese of Salto covers four departments: Artigas, Salto, Paysandú, and Río Negro. Its see is at the Cathedral of Salto.

The Diocese of Salto is a suffragan diocese of the ecclesiastical province of the metropolitan Archdiocese of Montevideo. The current bishop is Arturo Eduardo Fajardo Bustamante, who was appointed on 15 June 2020, transferring him from the Diocese of San José de Mayo.

== Bishops ==
Ordinaries

- Tomás Gregorio Camacho † (3 Jul 1919 Appointed – 20 May 1940 Died)
- Alfredo Viola † (20 May 1940 Succeeded – 1 Jan 1968 Resigned)
- Marcelo Mendiharat Pommies † (1 Jan 1968 Succeeded – 8 Mar 1989 Retired)
- Daniel Gil Zorrilla, S.J. † (8 Mar 1989 Appointed – 16 May 2006 Retired)
- Pablo Jaime Galimberti di Vietri (16 May 2006 Appointed – 24 Jul 2018 Retired)
- Fernando Miguel Gil Eisner † (24 Jul 2018 Appointed – 17 Jan 2020 Died)
- Arturo Eduardo Fajardo Bustamante (15 June 2020 Appointed – )

Auxiliary and co-adjutor bishops

- Alfredo Viola † (co-adjutor, 25 July 1936 – 20 May 1940)
- José María Cavallero † (auxiliary, 16 July 1952 – 20 December 1955), appointed Bishop of Melo
- Marcelo Mendiharat Pommies † (co-adjutor, 3 February 1959 – 1 January 1968)
- Carlos Alberto Nicolini † (auxiliary, since 28 October 1977; co-adjutor, 29 December 1984 – 19 June 1988), died without succeeding to see
- Heriberto Bodeant (auxiliary, 28 June 2003 – 13 June 2009), appointed Bishop of Melo

Other priest of this diocese who became bishop

- Francisco Domingo Barbosa Da Silveira † , appointed Bishop of Minas in 2004

== See also ==
- List of churches in the Diocese of Salto
- List of Roman Catholic dioceses in Uruguay
