= Ampora =

Ampora may refer to:

- Ampora, a Catholic titular see, associated with the Roman province of Numidia, in modern-day Algeria
- Eridan Ampora, a Homestuck character

== See also ==
- Amphora, an ancient storage vessel
