= Zerta =

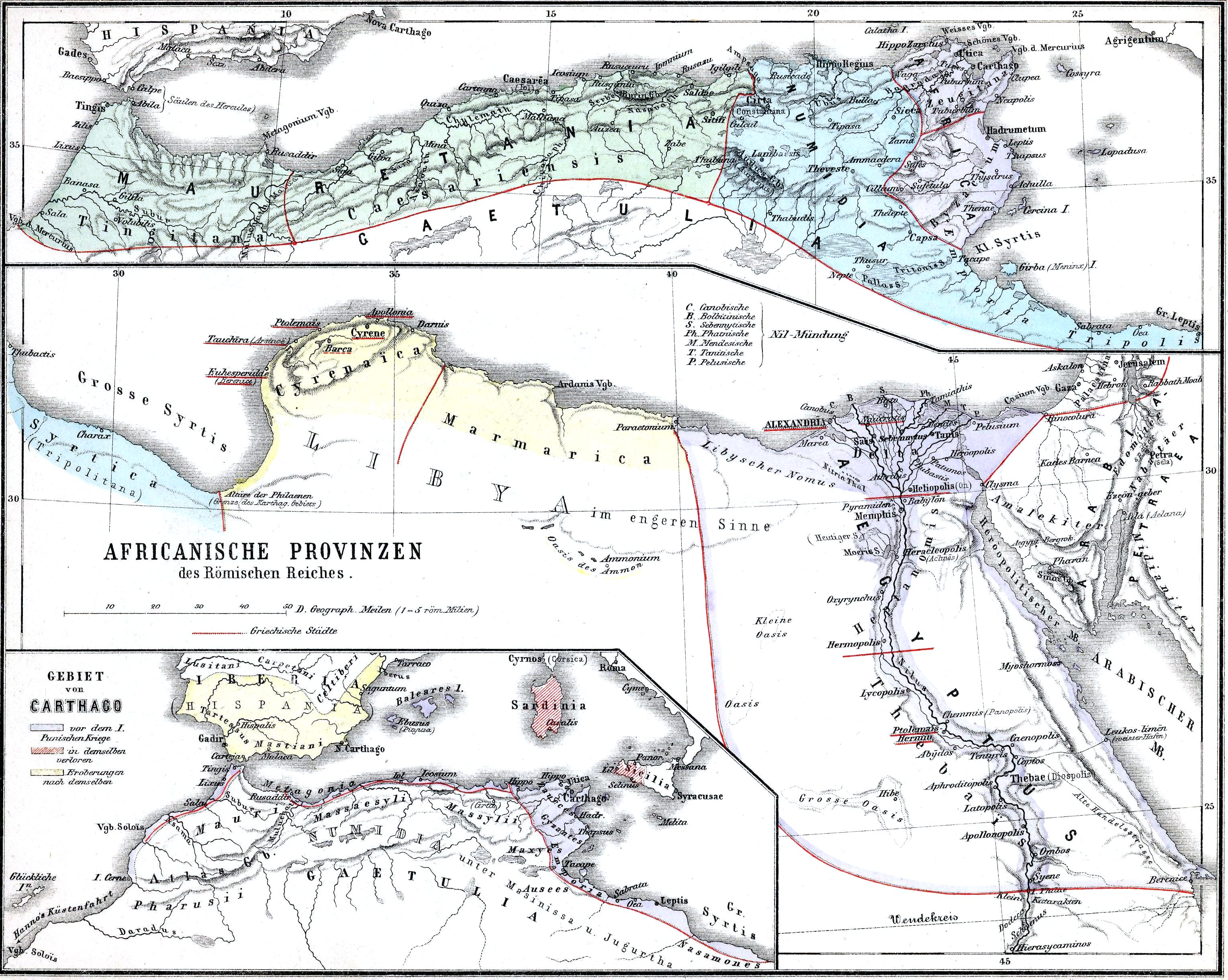
Africa Proconsulare

Zerta was an ancient Catholic titular episcopal see of the Roman province of Numidia in modern Algeria. It was a suffragan diocese of the Archdiocese of Carthage.

== Bishops ==
- Robert Joseph Hermann (16 Oct 2002 Appointed – )
- Titular Bishop: Bishop James Kavanagh (1973.03.06 – 2002.08.08)
- Titular Bishop: Bishop Edward Aloysius Fitzgerald (1969.01.08 – 1970.12.31)
- Titular Bishop: Bishop Marcelo Mendiharat Pommies (1959.02.03 – 1968.01.01)
- Titular Bishop: Bishop Manuel P. Del Rosario (1955.05.24 – 1958.07.25)
- Titular Bishop: Bishop Alfredo Lanfranconi, P.I.M.E. (1937.07.01 – 1955.01.01)
