= Inocencio María Yéregui =

Uruguayan cleric

- Bishop of Montevideo
- Church: Catholic Church
- Diocese: Diocese of Montevideo
- In office: 22 November 1881 – 1 February 1890
- Predecessor: Jacinto Vera
- Successor: Mariano Soler
- Previous posts: Titular Bishop of Canopus (1881); Auxiliary Bishop of Montevideo (1881)

Orders
- Ordination: 18 December 1858
- Consecration: 18 September 1881 by León Federico Aneiros

Personal details
- Born: Inocencio María Yéregui Goichea; 28 July 1833 Montevideo, Uruguay
- Died: 1 February 1890 (aged 56) Montevideo, Uruguay
- Residence: Montevideo
- Parents: Juan Fermín Yéregui; Luisa Goichea

Inocencio María Yéregui Goichea (28 July 1833 - 1 February 1890) was a Uruguayan cleric.

Upon the death of Bishop Jacinto Vera in May 1881, Yéregui was appointed auxiliary bishop of Montevideo and titular bishop of Canopus. On 22 November 1881 he was finally appointed Bishop of Montevideo.

== Bibliography ==
- Fernández Saldaña, J. M.: Diccionario Uruguayo de Biografías 1810–1940, Adolfo Linardi, Editorial Amerindia, Montevideo, 1945
- Chiarino, J. V.: Los Obispos de un siglo, conferencia dictada en el Club Católico de Montevideo el 7 de setiembre de 1978, publicada en Libro Annual 1978-1979 del Instituto Teológico del Uruguay, Montevideo, 1979.
