= Municipality of Canelones =

Canelones
- Municipality
- Location of the municipality of Canelones within the department and Uruguay.
- Coordinates: 34.51667°S 56.28333°W
- Country: Uruguay
- Department: Canelones
- Seat: Canelones

Government
  - Mayor: Mabel Curbelo

Area
  - Total: 226 km^{2} (87 sq mi)

Population
  - Total: 27,338
  - Density: 121/km^{2} (313/sq mi)
- Demonym: canario/a

Canelones is a Uruguayan municipality located in the department of Canelones. Its seat is the city of Canelones.

== Location ==
The municipality is located in the central-western region of the department of Canelones, south of the creek Canelón Grande.

== Populated places in the municipality of Canelones ==
- Canelones (department capital and municipality seat)
- Juanicó
- Barrio Remanso
- Parada Cabrera
- Villa Arejo
- Paso Palomeque
- Paso Espinosa
