= Diocese of Canelones =

Roman Catholic diocese in Uruguay

Coordinates: 34.5248°S 56.2820°W

Diocese of Canelones Dioecesis Canalopolitana Diócesis de Canelones

Catholic
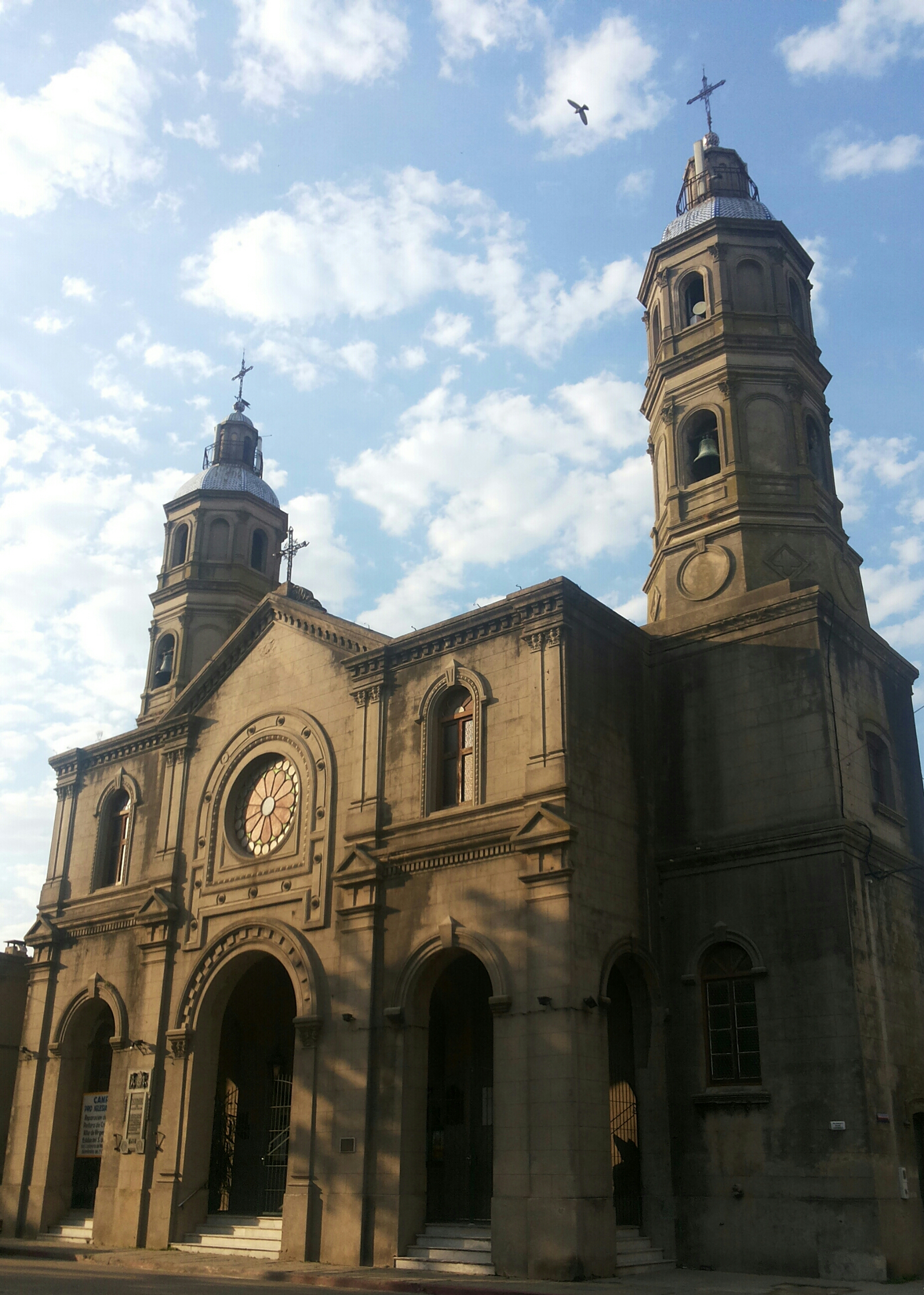
- Cathedral of Our Lady of Guadalupe

Location
- Country: Uruguay
- Ecclesiastical province: Montevideo

Statistics
- Area: 4,532 km^{2} (1,750 sq mi)
- Population: Total; Catholics: (as of 2006); 450,000; 337,000 (74.9%)
- Parishes: 33

Information
- Denomination: Catholic Church
- Sui iuris church: Latin Church
- Rite: Roman Rite
- Established: 25 November 1961 (64 years ago)
- Cathedral: Catedral Nuestra Señora de Guadalupe

Current leadership
- Pope: Leo XIV
- Bishop: Heriberto Andrés Bodeant Fernández
- Bishops emeritus: Orlando Romero Cabrera; Alberto Francisco María Sanguinetti Montero; Leopoldo Hermes Garin Bruzzone

Map
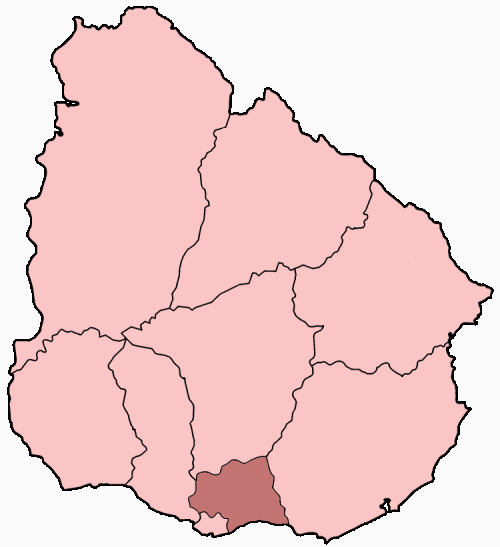

Website
- www.diocesisdecanelones.com

The Diocese of Canelones (Latin: Dioecesis Canalopolitana) is a Latin Church ecclesiastical territory or diocese of the Catholic church in Uruguay. The diocese was erected in 1961, and is a suffragan diocese in the ecclesiastical province of the metropolitan Archdiocese of Montevideo. Its episcopal see is the Cathedral of Canelones.

The current and fourth bishop of Canelones is Bishop Heriberto Andrés Bodeant Fernández, who was appointed by Pope Francis, on 19 March 2021. Bishop Fernández is assisted by the auxiliary bishop of Canelones, Auxiliary Bishop Leopoldo Hermes Garin Bruzzone, Titular Bishop of Benepota. The bishops emeritus are Orlando Romero Cabrera and Alberto Francisco María Sanguinetti Montero; the first bishop, Bishop Emeritus Nuti, died on November 2, 1999, having served from 1962 to 1994.

== Bishops ==
=== Ordinaries ===
- Orestes Santiago Nuti Sanguinetti, S.D.B. † (2 Jan 1962 – 25 Oct 1994 Retired)
- Orlando Romero Cabrera (25 Oct 1994 – 23 Feb 2010 Retired)
- Alberto Francisco María Sanguinetti Montero (23 Feb 2010 – 19 Mar 2021 Retired)
- Heriberto Andrés Bodeant Fernández (19 Mar 2021 – present)

=== Auxiliary bishop ===
- Leopoldo Hermes Garin Bruzzone (2002-)

== See also ==
- List of churches in the Diocese of Canelones
- List of Roman Catholic dioceses in Uruguay
