= Pablo Galimberti =

Uruguayan Roman Catholic cleric

Pablo Jaime Galimberti di Vietri
- Bishop emeritus of Salto
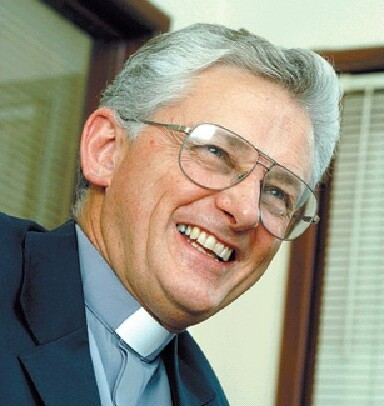
- Church: Catholic Church
- Diocese: Diocese of Salto
- In office: 16 May 2006 – 24 July 2018
- Predecessor: Daniel Gil Zorrilla
- Successor: Fernando Miguel Gil Eisner
- Previous post: Bishop of San José de Mayo (1983-2006)

Orders
- Ordination: 29 May 1971
- Consecration: 18 March 1984 by Franco Brambilla

Personal details
- Born: 8 May 1941 (age 85) Montevideo, Uruguay
- Denomination: Roman Catholic
- Residence: Salto
- Education: Pontifical Gregorian University
- Coat of arms

Pablo Jaime Galimberti di Vietri (born 8 May 1941, in Montevideo) is a Uruguayan Roman Catholic cleric.

Ordained 29 May 1971, he was appointed Bishop of San José on 12 December 1983. Later, he was appointed Bishop of Salto on 16 May 2006. He retired on 24 July 2018.
