= Diocese of San José de Mayo =

Roman Catholic diocese in Uruguay

Diocese of San José de Mayo Dioecesis Sancti Iosephi in Uraquaria Diócesis de San José de Mayo

Catholic
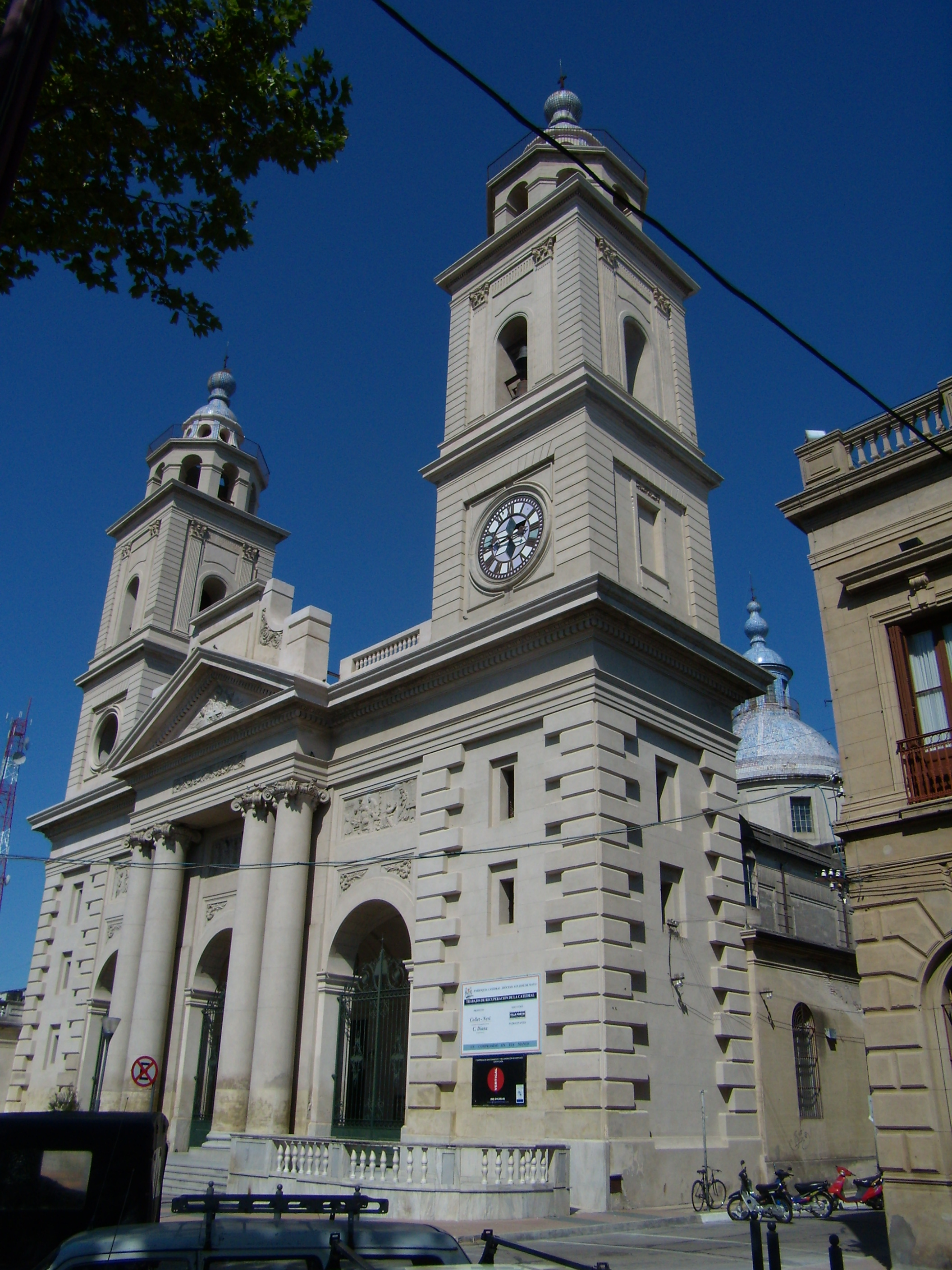
- Cathedral Basilica of St. Joseph

Location
- Country: Uruguay
- Ecclesiastical province: Montevideo

Statistics
- Area: 11,482 km^{2} (4,433 sq mi)
- Population: Total; Catholics: (as of 2004); 112,401; 85,000 (75.6%)
- Parishes: 11

Information
- Denomination: Catholic Church
- Rite: Roman Rite
- Established: 15 November 1955 (70 years ago)
- Cathedral: Catedral Basílica de San José de Mayo

Current leadership
- Pope: Leo XIV
- Bishop: Edgardo Fabián Antúnez-Percíncula Kaenel, S.J.

Map
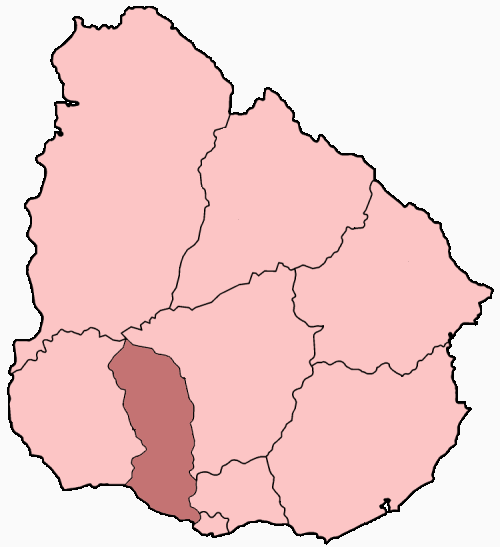

Website
- Diócesis de San José de Mayo

The Roman Catholic Diocese of San José de Mayo (Latin: Dioecesis Sancti Iosephi in Uraquaria) is a diocese of the Latin Church of the Catholic church in Uruguay.

== History ==
The diocese was created in 1955, from territory in the Archdiocese of Montevideo and the Diocese of Salto. It covers the Departments of San José and Flores. The diocese is currently a suffragan of the Archdiocese of Montevideo. Its see is at the Cathedral of San José de Mayo.

The see of San Jose de Mayo is currently led by Bishop Edgardo Fabián Antúnez-Percíncula Kaenel, S.J., since 30 June 2021.

== Bishops ==
=== Ordinaries ===
- Luis Baccino † (20 Dec 1955 Appointed – 5 Jul 1975 Died)
- Herbé Seijas † (15 Oct 1975 Appointed – 3 May 1983 Died)
- Pablo Jaime Galimberti di Vietri (12 Dec 1983 Appointed – 16 May 2006 Appointed, Bishop of Salto)
- Arturo Eduardo Fajardo Bustamante (27 Jun 2007 Appointed – 15 Jun 2020, Appointed, Bishop of Salto)
- Edgardo Fabián Antúnez-Percíncula Kaenel, S.J. (30 Jun 2021 Appointed – present)

=== Auxiliary bishop ===
- Herbé Seijas † (1975), appointed Bishop here

== See also ==
- List of churches in the Diocese of San José de Mayo
- List of Roman Catholic dioceses in Uruguay
