= Cathedral of Tacuarembó =

Cathedral in Tacuarembó, Uruguay

Coordinates: 31.7118°S 55.9786°W

Catedral de San Fructuoso
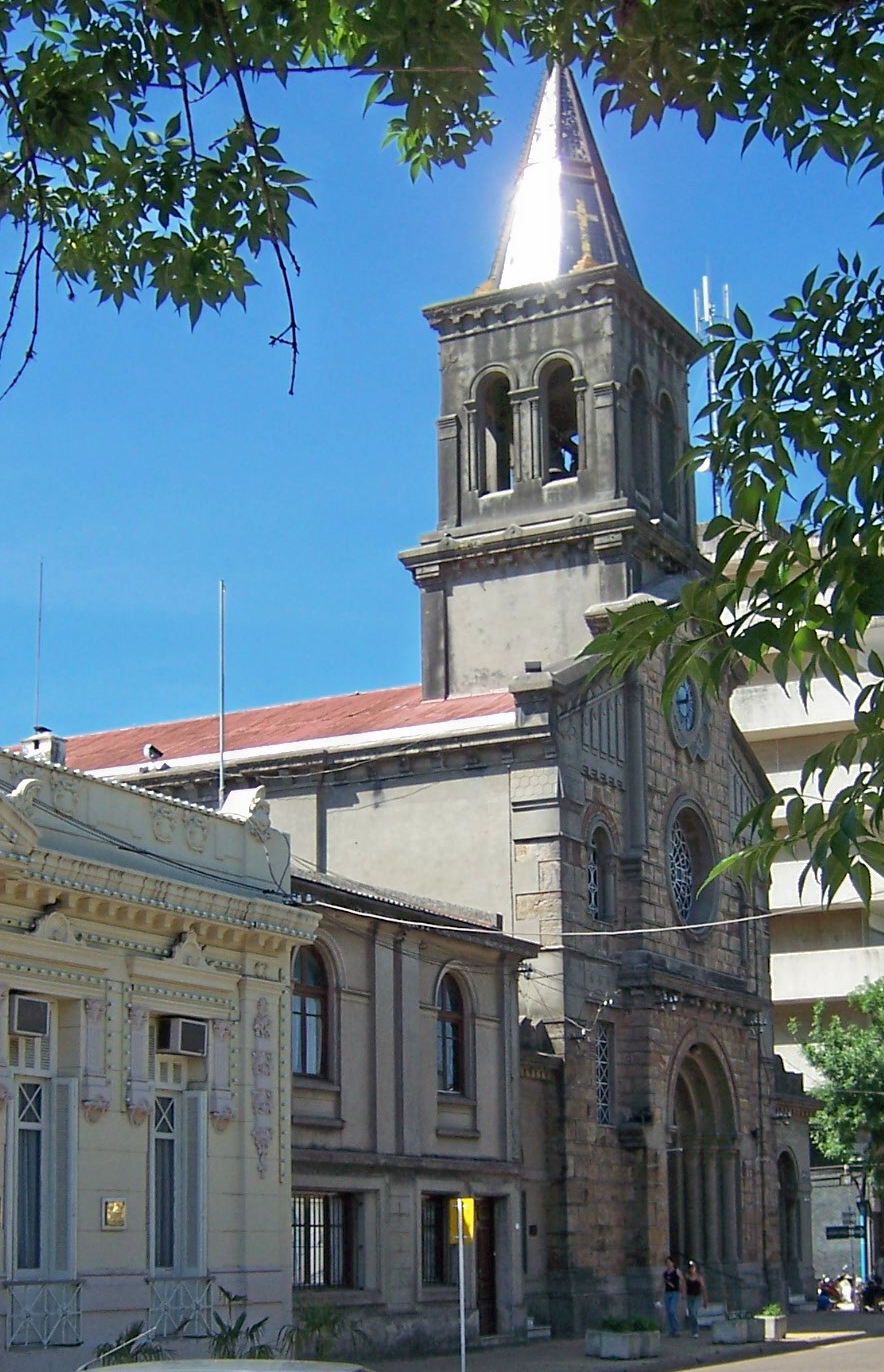

Religion
- Affiliation: Roman Catholic
- Diocese: Diocese of Tacuarembó
- Year consecrated: 1917

Location
- Location: Tacuarembó, Uruguay
- Interactive map of Catedral de San Fructuoso

Architecture
- Style: Romanesque Revival

The Saint Fructuosus Cathedral (Spanish: Catedral de San Fructuoso) is the main Roman Catholic church building of Tacuarembó, Uruguay. It is the see of the Roman Catholic Diocese of Tacuarembó since 1960.

== History ==
The original church was established on 30 August 1834. Originally it was a very humble ranch with thatched roof.

The present temple, built in Romanesque Revival style, was consecrated in 1917. The clock is operational since 1930.

Declared a National Monument, this temple is dedicated to saint Fructuosus of Tarragona.

== See also ==
- List of Roman Catholic cathedrals in Uruguay
- Roman Catholic Diocese of Tacuarembó
