= Sisters Hospitaller of the Sacred Heart of Jesus =

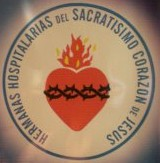

The Sisters Hospitallers of the Sacred Heart of Jesus, acronym H.S.C., is an institute of consecrated life established in 1881 by the Italian priest St. Benedict Menni (1841–1914) together with María Josefa Recio and María Angustias Giménez.

It is devoted to poor sick people, especially the mentally handicapped, and the elderly.

== History ==
The congregation was founded on 31 May 1881, in the psychiatric hospital of Ciempozuelos, near Madrid, by Father Benedetto Menni (1841-1914), a friar of the Brothers Hospitallers of Saint John of God, assisted by two nuns from Grenada (María Josefa Recio and María Angustias Giménez) in order to provide better care for the inmates of the psychiatric center. The congregation was approved by the Archbishop of Toledo on September 27, 1882.

On July 25, 1892, the institute was recognized as a congregation of pontifical right, by means of the decree of praise. It received definitive approval from the Holy See in 1901. Between 1881 and 1901 the congregation underwent a period of expansion in Spain with the foundation of 15 psychiatric hospitals.

== Organization ==
The Congregation of the Sisters Hospitallers of the Sacred Heart is a centralized organization, whose government is vested in the Superior General, with headquarters in Rome. The position of Superior General is currently held by the Portuguese nun Idília Maria Carneiro.

The hospital model of care encompasses prevention, treatment and rehabilitation, always committed to continuous quality improvement through the latest scientific advances and respect for the dignity of the people being cared for. Currently, the congregation has more than 85 social and community centers in more than 25 countries, where it provides medical and spiritual care to about 820 thousand people each year, with more than 11,100 workers and numerous volunteers, more than 1,000 religious sisters and 101 communities.

== Hospitaller values ==
Hospitality is an essential human value in social, welfare, and health care settings. Hospitality, as Sisters Hospitallers live it in their charism, obliges us to welcome all, independently of religion or their life plans.

This value implies:

1. Sensitivity for the excluded: empathy for their illness or mental limitations.
2. Service to the sick and needy: everything is at the service of the people served.
3. Liberating welcome: warmth in welcome of the patient; achieving the highest level of rehabilitation.
4. Integral health: its work for health covers all the dimensions of the person according to integral humanism with the purpose of healing and caring.
5. Professional quality: rigor, efficiency in management, teamwork, adaptation of devices and permanent updating of professionals.
6. Humanity in care: humanization in approaches and in each specific activity. Priority is given to the dignity of the person.
7. Ethics in all actions: acting according to the criteria of bioethics and the principle of Hospitality.
8. Historical awareness: fostering individual and collective awareness of being part of the hospitaller history, faithful to the origins, protagonists of the present, builders of the hospitaller future.

== Bibliography ==
- Annuario Pontificio per l'anno 2007, Libreria Editrice Vaticana, Vatican City 2007. ISBN 978-88-209-7908-9.
- Guerrino Pelliccia e Giancarlo Rocca (curr.), Dizionario degli Istituti di Perfezione (10 voll.), Edizioni paoline, Milan 1974–2003.
