= José Benito Lamas =

Uruguayan Roman Catholic priest

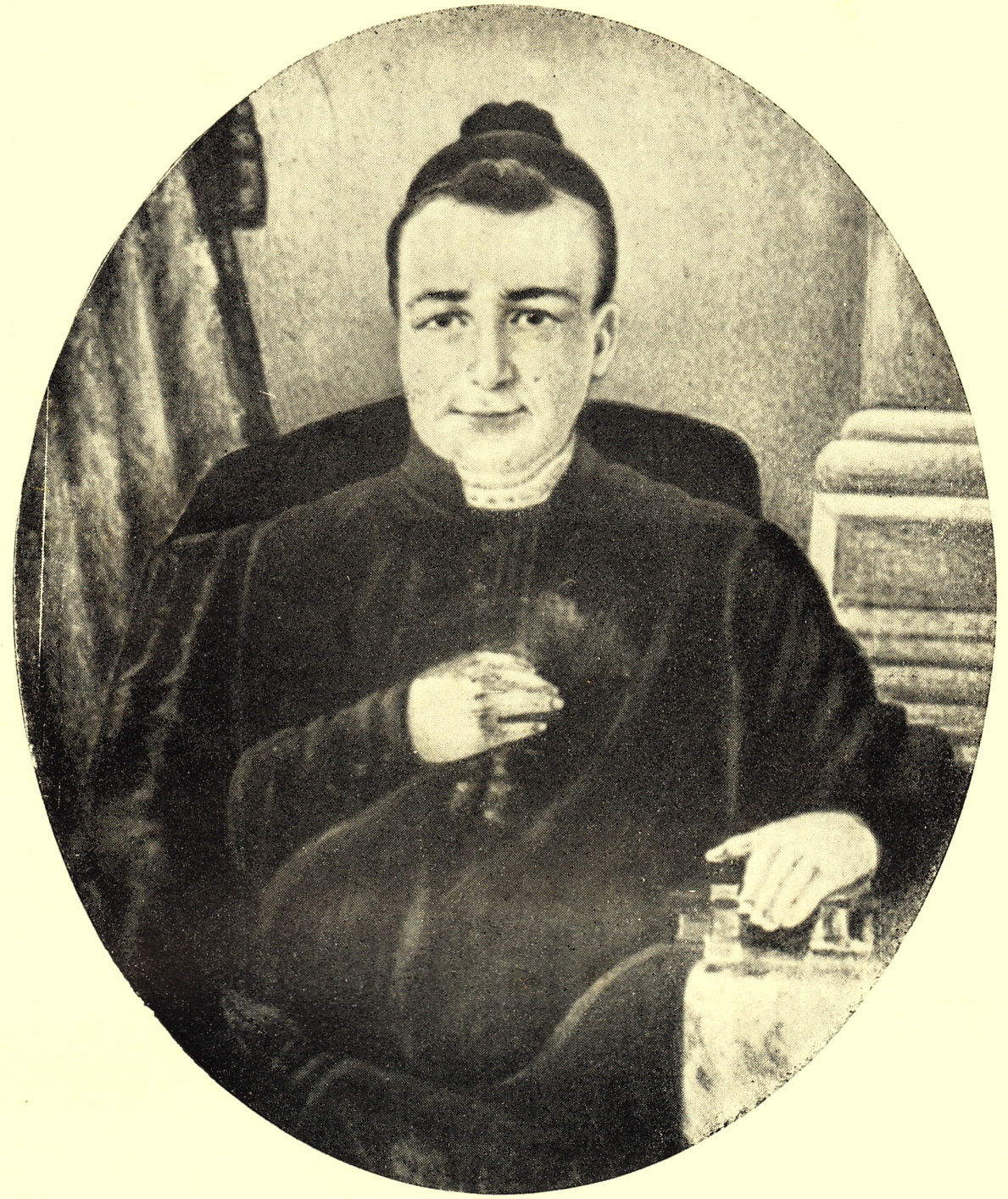

José Benito Lamas (Montevideo, 12 January 1787 - 9 May 1857) was a Roman Catholic priest from the Banda Oriental.

== Biography ==
He was ordained in the Franciscan Order and studied theology and philosophy. He was a notable patriot during the fight for freedom in colonial times; José Artigas appointed him military chaplain and educator.

In 1833, in the newly created Republic of Uruguay, Lamas was appointed lecturer of philosophy.

He was an interest candidate for first bishop of Montevideo, but he died in 1857, during a yellow fever epidemic.

== Family ==
His sister Josefa married politician Santiago Vázquez. His brother Luis María Lamas was a notable politician in Uruguay; his nephew Andrés Lamas was a politician, diplomat and writer; his grand-nephew Luis Lamas was intendente in Rosario, Argentina.
