= Lorenzo Antonio Fernández =

Uruguayan priest and politician

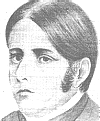
Lorenzo A. Fernández

Lorenzo Antonio Fernández (1792–1852) was a Uruguayan Roman Catholic priest and politician.

Nephew of Juan Francisco Larrobla, he played an important political role as a member of the Constituent and Legislative Assembly of the State. He was also the first rector of the University of the Republic.
