= Episcopal Conference of Uruguay =

Assembly of Catholic bishops

The Episcopal Conference of Uruguay (Spanish: Conferencia Episcopal del Uruguay, acronym CEU) is an episcopal conference of the Roman Catholic Church of Uruguay, that gathers the bishops of the country in order to discuss pastoral issues and in general all matters that have to do with the Church.

The Episcopal Conference is made up of 1 archbishop, 9 ordinary bishops, 2 auxiliary bishops and 6 bishops emeritus. Its current authorities (since 2019) are:

- Milton Tróccoli, President
- Daniel Sturla, Vice President
- Heriberto Bodeant, Secretary

== See also ==
- List of Roman Catholic dioceses in Uruguay
- Roman Catholic Church in Uruguay
