= Jacinto Vera =

Uruguayan Catholic bishop (1813–1881)

Blessed Jacinto Vera Durán
- Bishop of Montevideo
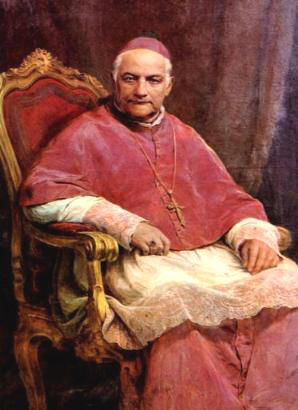
- Durán - 1878 painting.
- Church: Roman Catholic Church
- Diocese: Montevideo
- See: Montevideo
- Appointed: 15 July 1878
- Term ended: 6 May 1881
- Predecessor: None; diocese created
- Successor: Inocencio María Yéregui
- Other post: Titular Bishop of Megara (1864-1878)
- Previous post: Apostolic Vicar of Montevideo (1859-1878)

Orders
- Ordination: 5 June 1841 by Mariano Medrano y Cabrera
- Consecration: 16 July 1865 by Mariano José de Escalada

Personal details
- Born: Jacinto Vera Durán; 3 July 1813 Atlantic Ocean
- Died: 6 May 1881 (aged 67) Pan de Azúcar, Maldonado, Uruguay
- Buried: Montevideo Metropolitan Cathedral
- Parents: Gerardo Vera & Josefa Durán

Sainthood
- Feast day: 6 May
- Venerated in: Roman Catholic Church
- Beatified: 6 May 2023; Estadio Centenario, Montevideo, Uruguay by Cardinal Paulo Cezar Costa
- Attributes: Episcopal attire

Blessed Jacinto Vera Durán (Atlantic Ocean, 3 July 1813 – Pan de Azúcar, Uruguay, 6 May 1881) was a Uruguayan Roman Catholic prelate who served as the first bishop of Montevideo. He was an active minister in Uruguay, although his efforts to renew the priesthood and other ecclesial initiatives brought him into conflict with the Uruguayan government; this was the cause of his exile from the country, establishing himself in Buenos Aires between October 1862 and August 1863, at which point a political change in Uruguay made his return possible. The popularity showcased by his reception continued throughout the rest of his life due to his intense and prolonged missionary work all over the diocese of Montevideo (at that time the only one for the whole country), of which he was made bishop upon its creation in 1878. A neighborhood of Montevideo was named after him in 1895.

His fame of holiness led to the opening of his canonization process in 1935. On 5 May 2015, Pope Francis signed the decree of his heroic virtue, conferring him the title of Venerable upon him. On December 17, 2022, a miracle obtained through his intercession was approved and his beatification authorized; it was celebrated on 6 May 2023, in Montevideo.

== Life ==
Jacinto Vera y Durán was born in mid-1813 on board a boat on the Atlantic Ocean to Gerardo Vera and Josefa Durán; the boat had been taking his parents from their place of origin in the Canary Islands to Uruguay. The infant was baptized during a boat stop at Nossa Senhora do Desterro in Florianópolis in Brazil. His siblings included his sisters María Teodora and Marianna and his brothers Dionisio Antonio de los Dolores and Francisco who died while in Brazil.

From 1813 Vera lived on a leased farm until his parents purchased their own farm in 1819. He made his First Communion in the chapel of Our Lady of Carmen called Doña Ana and received his Confirmation around this stage as was the custom of the time. In 1832 he felt the call to the priesthood and from 1836 to 1841 studied under the Jesuits (at the Colegio San Ignacio) in Buenos Aires where he became known for his intelligence as well as for his sharp and cheerful persona. He was elevated into the diaconate on 28 May 1841 and received his ordination on 5 June from the Bishop of Buenos Aires Mariano Medrano y Cabrera. Vera celebrated his first Mass on 6 June at the church of the Catalinas in Buenos Aires before returning to Uruguay.

On 4 October 1859 Vera was appointed as the Vicar Apostolic of Montevideo and he took office on 14 December. He sought renewal among priests and in January 1860 summoned all priests for the Spiritual Exercises which he wanted to make a regular thing for their own growth as priests. He made a missionary trip from 25 April 1860 to January 1861 across the nation in order to meet with various people, preach and administer. But complications arose in Montevideo which caused him to be exiled to Buenos Aires from 8 October 1862 until 23 August 1863. But he was soon invited to return to his home nation after Venancio Flores put the offer to him; he was met with a grand welcome upon his return. It was upon his return that the Acting President Atanasio Aguirre asked Pope Pius IX to name Vera as a bishop. The pope accepted this recommendation in 1864 when he named Vera as the Titular Bishop of Megara on 22 September which prompted Vera to receive his episcopal consecration later on 16 July 1865.

In 1867 Vera left for Rome to participate in the XIX centennial of the death of Saint Peter and went on a long tour of Italy and France while also visiting neighbouring Spain and Portugal. It was also around this point that he made a pilgrimage to the Holy Land. In 1869 he set off to Rome again to participate in the First Vatican Council and was there until the council closed in 1870 with the loss of the Papal States.

From 10 to 17 July 1871 Vera carried out a peace mission between General Timoteo Aparicio and President Lorenzo Batlle y Grau but this mediation failed and led to the Revolution of the Lances. Vera supported the return of the Jesuits to the nation who settled in Montevideo on 3 September 1872 while also allowing for the Salesians of Don Bosco to come into the country with that order arriving on 26 December 1876; Bishop Vera sometimes corresponded with Saint Giovanni Bosco. Bishop Vera's posting as the vicar apostolic and the titular bishop ended on 15 July 1878 when the new Pope Leo XIII named him as the first Bishop of Montevideo after establishing the diocese and dissolving the apostolic vicariate.

== Death ==
The bishop died in 1881 while on a mission. His funeral attracted hundreds of individuals who had hailed him as an energetic pastor and as a saint known for his intelligence and his personal holiness.

== Beatification process ==
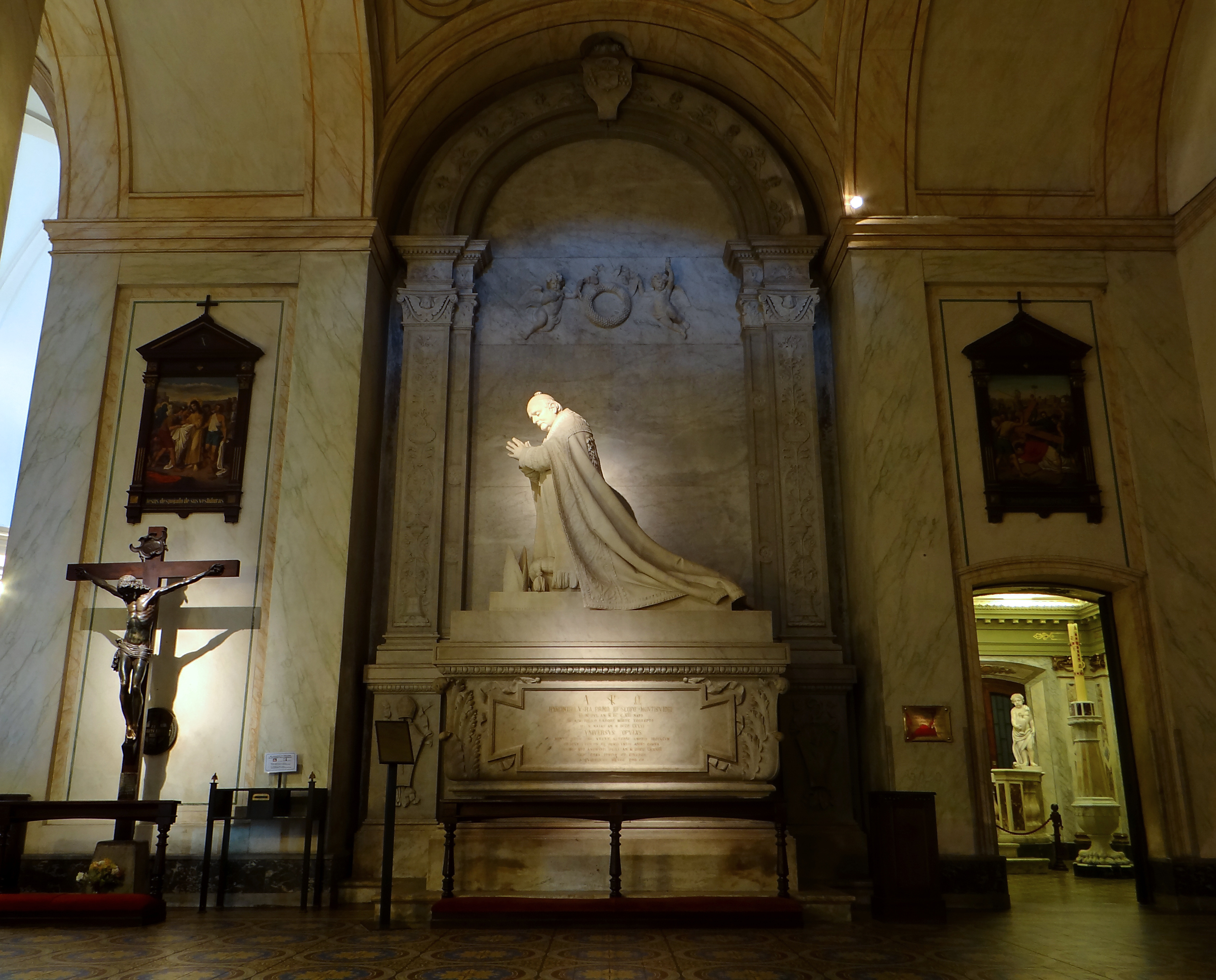
Tomb of Jacinto Vera

The beatification process opened in the Montevideo archdiocese in an informative process that spanned from 27 July 1935 until its closure not long after in 1942; the Congregation for Rites were given all boxes of documentation at the end of the process but the cause remained inactive until 28 February 1992 when the Congregation for the Causes of Saints validated the informative phase. The postulation later compiled and submitted the Positio to the Congreagation for the Causes of Saints in 2012 for further assessment with the dossier spanning well over 2000 pages. Historians approved the cause on 19 February 2013 as did theologians on 18 September 2014 and the Congregation's members on 5 May 2015.

Just moments after the Congregation approved the cause it was taken to Pope Francis for approval. The pope — on 5 May 2015 - confirmed that Vera had led a Christian life of heroic virtue and named him as Venerable. On 17 December 2022, Pope Francis recognized the miracle attributed to the late bishop's intercession, enabling his for beatification to take place. He was beatified in Montevideo on 6 May 2023 by Cardinal Paulo Cezar Costa, who presided over the celebration on the pontiff's behalf. The postulator for this cause is Carlo Calloni.

=== Debunked miracle ===
There was a supposed healing of a man dating back to 2005 in Montevideo that some believed to be a miracle from the intercession of the late bishop that could be investigated for his beatification. The Montevideo archdiocese opened a diocesan tribunal for this supposed miracle on 2 August 2015 though doubts about whether the healing was a miracle caused the investigation to cease since it was ruled that there existed evidence that could refute the supposed miraculous circumstances of the case.

== See also ==
- Jacinto Vera barrio
- San Jacinto, Uruguay

== Bibliography ==
- Lorenzo A. Pons, Biografía del Ilmo. y Revmo. señor don Jacinto Vera y Durán, primer Obispo de Montevideo, Barreiro y Ramos, Montevideo, 1904.
- Rafael Algorta Camusso, Monseñor Don Jacinto Vera. Notas biográficas, Colegio Sagrado Corazón, Montevideo, 1931.
- Ennrique Passadore, La vida de Mons. Jacinto Vera. Padre de la Iglesia Uruguaya, Montevideo Entre Siglos, Montevideo, 1997.
- Beatriz Torrendell Larravide, Geografía Histórica de Jacinto Vera. 150 años de la Misión, edición de la autora, Montevideo, 2010.
- José Gabriel González Merlano, El conflicto eclesiástico (1861-1862). Aspectos jurídicos de la discusión acerca del Patronato Nacional, Universidad Católica del Uruguay y Tierra Adentro, Montevideo 2010.
- Laura Álvarez Goyoaga, Don Jacinto Vera. El misionero santo (Historia novelada) Doble clic, Montevideo, 2010
