= Carlos María Collazzi Irazábal =

Uruguayan bishop

The Most Reverend Carlos María Collazzi Irazábal S.D.B.
- Bishop of Mercedes
- Church: Roman Catholic Church
- Diocese: Mercedes
- See: Mercedes
- Appointed: 14 February 1995
- Predecessor: Andrés María Rubio Garcia
- Other post(s): Vice-President of the Uruguayan Episcopal Conference (2019-)
- Previous post(s): President of the Uruguayan Episcopal Conference (2000-04; 2007-13; 2016-19); First Vice-President of the Latin American Episcopal Council (2015-19)

Orders
- Ordination: 4 October 1980
- Consecration: 26 March 1995 by Andrés María Rubio Garcia

Personal details
- Born: Carlos María Collazzi Irazábal; 20 September 1947 (age 77); Rosario, Uruguay

Carlos María Collazzi Irazábal, S.D.B. (born 20 September 1947) is the current bishop of Mercedes.

== Life ==
Carlos María Collazzi Irazábal was born in Rosario, Uruguay, on 20 September 1947, and entered the religious order of the Salesians of Don Bosco and was ordained a priest on 4 October 1980. On 14 February 1995 Pope John Paul II appointed him Bishop of the Roman Catholic Diocese of Mercedes. He was consecrated a bishop by his predecessor as bishop, Andrés María Rubio Garcia SDB, on 26 March, with the Bishop of Canelones Orlando Cabrera Romero and the Bishop of Florida Raúl Horacio Scarrone Carrero as co-consecrators.

He was elected head of CELAM's economic committee in May 2011.

He visited Chile in December 2011 and January 2012 on behalf of the Vatican to investigate the situation of priests associated with Fernando Karadima, who had been suspended from his priestly functions early in 2011 for the sexual abuse of minors. As a result of his reportedly "superficial" report, the priests received a few hours of additional training.

In November 2015, he was elected for the third time to a three-year term as President of the Episcopal Conference of Uruguay, from April 2016 to April 2019. He is first vice-president of the Episcopal Conference of Latin America (CELAM) from 2015 to 2019.
