= Canelones, Uruguay =

Capital city and municipality in Uruguay

Canelones
- Capital city & Municipality
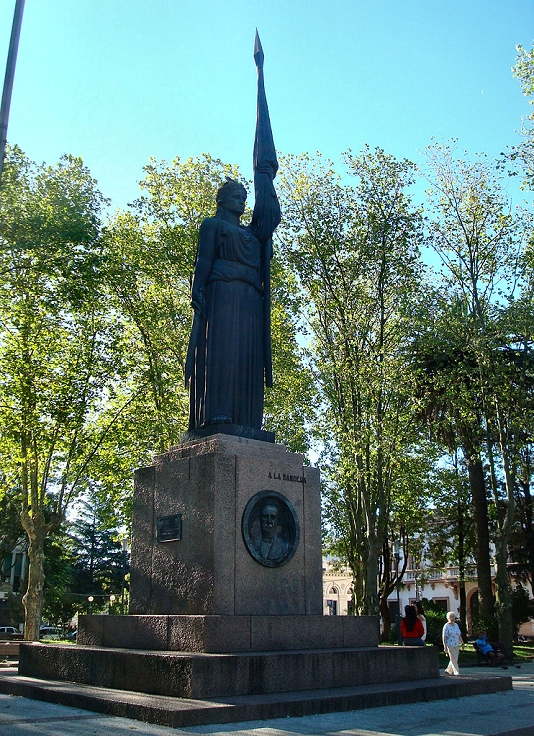
- Monument "A La Bandera" in the central square

- Location within Uruguay
- Coordinates: 34°31′0″S 56°17′0″W
- Country: Uruguay
- Department: Canelones
- Municipality: Canelones
- Founded: 1782
- Founder: Agustin Savio

Area
  - Total: 11.6 km^{2} (4.5 sq mi)
- Elevation: 29 m (95 ft)

Population (2013 Census)
  - Total: 24,185
  - Density: 2,080/km^{2} (5,400/sq mi)
  - Demonym: canario (m) / canaria (f)
- Time zone: UTC -3
- Postal code: 90000
- Dial plan: +598 433 (+5 digits)
- Climate: Cfa
- Website: www.imcanelones.gub.uy

Canelones (Spanish pronunciation: [kaneˈlones]) is the capital of the department of Canelones in Uruguay. Its name is derived from a species of cinnamon, which is called "canelón", growing along the banks of the homonymous river. Since 2010, the city is also the seat of the municipality of Canelones.

== Geography ==
The city is located on Route 5 about 50 kilometres (31 mi) North of Montevideo and on its intersection with Route 64. It lies on the west bank of the river Arroyo Canelón Chico.

== History ==
It was founded on 24 April 1783 under the name "Villa Guadalupe". It became capital of one of the nine earlier Departments of the Republic. The railroad arrived here in 1874, while in 1908 National Route 5 from Montevideo was inaugurated. On 23 March 1916, it was renamed to "Canelones" and its status was elevated to "Ciudad" (city) by the Act of Ley Nº 5.400.

== Population ==
According to the 2011 census, Canelones had a population of 19,865. In 2010, the Intendencia de Canelones had recorded a population of 25,961 for the municipality during the elections. While Canelones is the capital of the department of the same name, it has a considerably smaller population compared with two other cities in the department, Ciudad de la Costa and Las Piedras.

Location map of the Municipality of Canelones

Year	Population
1908	8,523
1963	14,028
1975	15,988
1985	17,323
1996	19,388
2004	19,631
2011	19,865
2023	24,185

Source: Instituto Nacional de Estadística de Uruguay

== Economic activity ==
The city and the department have numerous small to large vineyards and wineries. In 1987 the cold-storage facility "Frigorífico Canelones" was founded, which ever since became the principal industry of the city.

== Government and infrastructure ==
The civil aviation agency of the country, National Civil Aviation and Aviation Infrastructure Direction (DINACIA), has its headquarters in Canelones.

== Places of worship ==
- Cathedral of Our Lady of Guadalupe (Roman Catholic)

== Noted local people ==
- Diego Lugano, former international footballer
- Pablo Gabriel García, former international footballer for
- Matías Vecino, international footballer
- Facundo Peraza (born July 27, 1992), footballer
- Robert Siboldi, Former football player and former manager of Santos Laguna
- Sebastián Rodríguez (born 1992), footballer

== Sister Cities ==
- Asunción, Paraguay
- Loudoun County, United States

== See also ==
- Canelones Department#Main Urban Centres
