= List of Catholic dioceses in Uruguay =

The diocesan system of Christian church government in Uruguay comprises one ecclesiastical province headed by an archbishop. The province is in turn subdivided into 8 dioceses and 1 archdiocese each headed by a bishop or an archbishop.

The province had had 9 suffragan dioceses, but on 2 March 2020, the Diocese of Minas was suppressed by combining it with the Diocese of Maldonado-Punta del Este to form the Diocese of Maldonado-Punta del Este-Minas.

== List of Dioceses ==
=== Ecclesiastical province of Montevideo ===
Diocese	Ordinary	Since	Notes
Archdiocese of Montevideo	Daniel Sturla	11 February 2014	auxiliary: Luis Eduardo González Cedrés; emeritus: Nicolás Cotugno
Diocese of Canelones	Heriberto Andrés Bodeant Fernández	23 February 2010	emeritus: Orlando Romero Cabrera emeritus: Alberto Francisco María Sanguinetti Montero emeritus: Leopoldo Hermes Garin Bruzzone
Diocese of Florida	Martín Pérez Scremini	15 March 2008	
Diocese of Maldonado-Punta del Este-Minas	Milton Tróccoli	9 November 1985	emeritus of Maldonado-Punta del Este: Rodolfo Wirz; emeritus of Minas: Jaime Rafael Fuentes
Diocese of Melo	Pablo Alfonso Jourdán Alvariza	13 June 2009	emeritus: Luis del Castillo Estrada
Diocese of Mercedes	Carlos Collazzi	14 February 1995	
Diocese of Salto	Arturo Fajardo	15 June 2020	emeritus: Pablo Galimberti
Diocese of San José de Mayo	Edgardo Fabián Antúnez-Percíncula Kaenel		
Diocese of Tacuarembó	Pedro Ignacio Wolcan Olano	20 December 1989	

== See also ==
- Episcopal Conference of Uruguay
- List of cathedrals in Uruguay
- Catholic Church in Uruguay
