= Roman Catholic Archdiocese of Ohrid =

The Roman Catholic Archdiocese of Ohrid (also Archdiocese of Achrida, Archdiocese of Ochrida or Archdiocese of Acrida, Latin: Achridanus seu Ochridanus) was a Latin Catholic archdiocese, suppressed in the 1700s, and is now a titular see, at modern Ohrid in North Macedonia.

== History ==
Ancient Achrida, in the Roman province of Epirus Novus, was the capital of the Metropolitan Archbishopric of Ohrid, which became Orthodox.

Among its suffragans was the Diocese of Bela and the Diocese of Tzernicus (in Epirus).

In 1300 or 1320, a new Latin Catholic archdiocese was founded. It was suppressed in 1700, but would have two Catholic successor titular archbishoprics.

== Episcopal ordinaries ==
(all Roman Rite; ?incomplete)

Residential Metropolitan Archbishops of Ohrid

- Nicola, OP (1320.03.19 – ?)
- Matteo, OFMConv (1517 – ?)
- Rafael Levaković, OFM (27 May 1647 – 1650 Died)
- Andrea Bogdani (27 Feb 1651 – 6 Mar 1656 Appointed, see below), later Metropolitan Archbishop of Skopje (1656.03.06 – 1677.09.06), remaining Apostolic Administrator of Acrida (Ohrid) (1675.12.18 – death 1689.11)
- Francesco Soimirovic (Franjo Svimirovich), OFMObs (20 Mar 1656 Appointed – ), previously Archbishop-Bishop of Prizren (Kosovo) (1651.02.27 – 1656.03.20)
- Apostolic Administrator Andrea Bogdani (see above 1675.12.18 – 1689.11)

== Titular Metropolitan Archbishoprics ==
=== Latin Titular see ===
At its suppression in 1700, the former Latin residential archdiocese became a Latin Catholic titular archbishopric of the highest (Metropolitan) rank.

It is vacant, having had the following incumbents, all of the fitting archiepiscopal rank (and Latin, except the first):

- Basilio Matranga, OSBM, Eastern Catholic (1726.10.07 – death 1748); previously Titular Bishop of Dionysias (1715.08.19 – 1726.10.07), no actual prelature
- Luigi Maria Cardelli, OFMRef (born Italy) (1832.09.11 – death 1868.06.11) as emeritate; previously Coadjutor Apostolic Vicar of Smyrna (now İzmir, Asian Turkey) (? – 1817.06.26) succeeding as last Apostolic Vicar of Smyrna (1817.06.26 – 1818.03.18), (see) promoted first Metropolitan Archbishop of Smyrna (Turkey) (1818.03.18 – retired 1832.08.29)
- Leopoldo Angelo Santanché, OFM (1871.03.08 – 1876.04.03), first as Archbishop of Santo Domingo (Dominican Republic) (1871.03.08 – 1874.11.13), then as Apostolic Vicar of Constantinopole (Ottoman imperial capital; now Istanbul, European & Asian Turkey) (1874.11.13 – 1876.04.03); later Archbishop-Bishop of Fabriano (Italy) (1876.04.03 – death 1892.02.10)
- Placido Petacci (born Italy) (1885.03.05 – death 1885.08.13) as 'promoted' emeritate; previously Titular Bishop of Troas (1879.05.12 – 1880.12.13) as Auxiliary Bishop of Suburbicarian Diocese of Sabina (Italy) (1879.05.12 – 1880.12.13), Bishop of Tivoli (Italy) (1880.12.13 – retired 1885.03.05)
- Andrea Aiuti (born Italy) (1887.03.31 – 1893.06.12), first as Prior General of the Carmelites of Mary Immaculate (1887 – 1891) and Apostolic Delegate (papal diplomatic envoy) to British East India (1887.03.31 – 1891.07.24), then as Secretary of Sacred Congregation of the Propagation of the Faith (1891.07.24 – 1893.06.07); later Titular Archbishop of Tamiathis (1893.06.12 – 1903.06.22) as Apostolic Nuncio (papal ambassador) to Bavaria (1893.06.07 – 1896.09.26) and as Apostolic Nuncio to Portugal (1896.09.26 – 1903.11), created Cardinal-Priest of S. Girolamo dei Croati (1903.11.12 – death 1905.04.28)
- Raffaele d’Ambrosio, OFM (1893.07.14 – ?) as emeritate, previously Archbishop of Durrës (Albania) (1847.12.17 – retired 1893.07.14)
- Michael Kelly (1901.07.16 – 1911.08.17) as Coadjutor Archbishop of Sydney (Australia) (1901.07.16 – 1911.08.17); next succeeded as Metropolitan Archbishop of Sydney (1911.08.17 – death 1940.03.08)
- Angel María Pérez y Cecilia, OCD) (born Spain) (1915.06.18 – 1918.12.18) as Coadjutor Archbishop of Verapoly (Malabar, British India) (1915.06.18 – 1918.12.18); next succeeded as Metropolitan Archbishop of Verapoly (1918.12.18 – 1934.11.12), emeritate as Titular Archbishop of Novæ Patræ (1934.11.12 – death 1945.06.14)
- Jan Feliks Cieplak (1919.03.28 – 1925.12.14), first as Auxiliary Bishop of Archdiocese of Mohilev (Belarus) (1908.07.12 – 1925.12.14; previously as Titular Bishop of Evaria, 1908.07.12 – 1919.03.28), then as Apostolic Administrator of Mohilev (1923.07.05 – 1925.12.14); next Metropolitan Archbishop of Vilnius (Lithuania) (1925.12.14 – death 1926.02.17)
- Cleto Cassani (1929.07.01 – 1939.03.11) as emeritate; previously Titular Bishop of Thacia Montana (1911.01.19 – 1917.01.05) as Auxiliary Bishop of Archdiocese of Sassari (Sardinia, Italy) (1911.01.19 – 1917.01.05), succeeding as Metropolitan Archbishop of Sassari (Italy) (1917.01.05 – retired 1929.07.01)
- Alexandre Vachon (1939.12.11 – 1940.05.22) as Coadjutor Archbishop of Ottawa (Ontario, Canada) (1939.12.11 – 1940.05.22); next succeeded as Metropolitan Archbishop of Ottawa (1940.05.22 – death 1953.03.30)
- Émile Maurice Guerry (1940.05.31 – 1952.12.02) as Coadjutor Archbishop of Cambrai (France) (1940.05.31 – 1952.12.02); next succeeded as Metropolitan Archbishop of Cambrai (1952.12.02 – retired 1966.02.15), emeritate as Titular Archbishop of Octava (1966.02.15 – death 1969.03.11)
- José Humberto Quintero Parra (1953.09.07 – 1960.08.31) as Coadjutor Archbishop of Mérida (Venezuela) (1953.09.07 – 1960.08.31); next Metropolitan Archbishop of Caracas (Venezuela) (1960.08.31 – 1980.05.24), President of Episcopal Conference of Venezuela (1961 – 1972), created Cardinal-Priest of Ss. Andrea e Gregorio al Monte Celio (1961.01.19 – 1984.07.08)
- Miguel Paternain, CSsR (1960.09.21 – death 1970.10.19) on emeritate; previously Bishop of Melo (Uruguay) (1929.04.20 – 1931.08.11), last Bishop of Florida–Melo (Uruguay) (1931.08.11 – 1955.11.15) restyled first Bishop of Florida (Uruguay) (1955.11.15 – retired 1960.02.27), Titular Bishop of Mades (1960.02.27 – 1960.09.21)
- Mario Schierano (born Italy) (1971.08.28 – 1990.10.28) as Archbishop Military Vicar of Italy (Italy) (1971.08.28 – 1981.10.27), President of Pontifical Commission for Sacred Archaeology (1987 – 1990.10.28); previously Undersecretary of Supreme Tribunal of the Apostolic Signatura (1965 – 1969), Secretary of Prefecture for the Economic Affairs of the Holy See (1969 – 1971.08.28)
- Varkey Vithayathil, CSsR (1996.11.11 – 1997.04.19) as Apostolic Administrator of Ernakulam–Angamaly of the Syro-Malabars (India) (1996.11.11 – 1999.12.18), President of Synod of the Syro-Malabar Church (1996.11.11 – 2011.04.01); next Titular Archbishop of Antinoë (1997.04.19 – 1999.12.18), succeeded as Major Archbishop of Ernakulam–Angamaly of the Syro-Malabars (1999.12.18 – 2011.04.01), created Cardinal-Priest of S. Bernardo alle Terme (2001.02.21 [2001.05.20] – 2011.04.01), President of Catholic Bishops’ Conference of India (2008.02.19 – 2010.03.01).

=== Armenian Titular see ===
In 1911, an Armenian Catholic (Armenian Rite in Armenian language) Metropolitan titular archbishopric was also established.

It was suppressed in 1928, having had only one incumbent :

- Giuseppe Rokossian (1911.08.27 – 1928.07.01), later Archeparch (Archbishop) of Istanbul of the Armenians (Turkey) ([1928.06.29] 1928.07.01 – 1931.06.08).

== See also ==
- List of Catholic dioceses in Macedonia
- Catholic Church in North Macedonia

== Sources and external links ==
- GigaCatholic with incumbent biography links
- "Achrida (Titular See)". catholic-hierarchy.org.
