= Carlos Parteli =

Roman Catholic archbishop

Carlos Parteli Keller
- Archbishop of Montevideo
- Church: Catholic Church
- Archdiocese: Archdiocese of Montevideo
- In office: 17 November 1976 – 5 June 1985
- Predecessor: Antonio María Barbieri
- Successor: José Gottardi Cristelli
- Previous posts: Titular Archbishop of Turris in Mauretania (1966-1976); Coadjutor Archbishop of Montevideo (1966-1976); Bishop of Tacuarembó (1960-1966)

Orders
- Ordination: 15 April 1933
- Consecration: 27 December 1960 by Raffaele Forni

Personal details
- Born: 8 March 1910 Rivera, Uruguay
- Died: 26 May 1999 (aged 89) Montevideo, Uruguay
- Denomination: Roman Catholic
- Residence: Montevideo

Carlos Parteli Keller (8 March 1910 in Rivera – 26 May 1999 in Montevideo) was a Uruguayan Roman Catholic cleric.

== Biography ==
At 13 years of age he entered the Minor Seminary and at 16 he was sent to Rome by the second Bishop of Melo José Joaquín Arrospide to study at the South American College in Rome. He studied philosophy and theology and was ordained priest on Holy Saturday of 1933 in the Church of San Juan Bautista Berrán. On his return to Uruguay he served as parish priest of the Cathedral of Florida until 1939, when he became secretary of Bishop Miguel Paternain.

In 1942 he moved to Rivera, where he was appointed pastor of the Immaculate Conception Parish Church. Later, in 1960, he was appointed bishop of then newly created Roman Catholic Diocese of Tacuarembó.

He was appointed Coadjutor Archbishop of Montevideo and titular bishop of Turris in Mauretania in 1966. A decade later, on 17 November 1976, he succeeded as Archbishop of Montevideo.

At the age of 75 years in 1985 Partelli provided renounces to his title and went to reside in an adjoining inter-diocesan seminary, near San Carlos Borromeo Parish in Millan Avenue. He died in 1999.
