= Orlando Romero Cabrera =

Uruguayan Roman Catholic bishop (born 1933)

The Most Reverend Orlando Romero Cabrera
- Bishop Emeritus of Canelones
- Church: Catholic Church
- Diocese: Canelones
- Appointed: 25 October 1994
- Term ended: 23 February 2010
- Predecessor: Orestes Santiago Nuti Sanguinetti
- Successor: Alberto Sanguinetti Montero
- Other posts: Titular Bishop of Gubaliana (1986–1994); Auxiliary Bishop of Montevideo (1986–1994)
- Previous post: Vicar General of the Archdiocese of Montevideo

Orders
- Ordination: 15 December 1957
- Consecration: 13 July 1986 by José Gottardi Cristelli

Personal details
- Born: 21 December 1933 (age 92) Fagina, San José Department, Uruguay

Orlando Romero Cabrera (born 21 December 1933) is a Uruguayan Roman Catholic prelate who served as Bishop of Canelones from 1994 to 2010. He previously served as titular bishop of Gubaliana and as an auxiliary bishop of Montevideo from 1986 to 1994.

== Early life and priesthood ==
Romero Cabrera was born on 21 December 1933 in Fagina, in the San José Department of Uruguay. He was ordained a priest on 15 December 1957 for the Archdiocese of Montevideo.

Before his episcopal appointment, Romero Cabrera served as vicar general of the Archdiocese of Montevideo.

== Episcopate ==
On 26 May 1986, Pope John Paul II appointed Romero Cabrera titular bishop of Gubaliana and auxiliary bishop of Montevideo. The appointment was recorded by the Holy See in the Acta Apostolicae Sedis. He was consecrated a bishop on 13 July 1986. The principal consecrator was José Gottardi Cristelli, then Archbishop of Montevideo, with Raúl Horacio Scarrone Carrero and Pablo Jaime Galimberti di Vietri as co-consecrators.

Romero Cabrera served as auxiliary bishop of Montevideo until 1994. On 25 October 1994, he was appointed Bishop of Canelones, succeeding Orestes Santiago Nuti Sanguinetti.

As Bishop of Canelones, Romero Cabrera participated in the activities of the Catholic Church in Uruguay and represented the diocese in wider ecclesial gatherings. In 2008, he was listed by the Holy See among the bishops of the Episcopal Conference of Uruguay attending the Synod of Bishops.

In June 2009, during the Year for Priests, Romero Cabrera addressed the priests of Uruguay on priestly identity and spirituality. He emphasized the need for a priestly spirituality rooted in the human condition and described Lectio divina as a means of progressively assimilating the Word of God.

== Retirement ==
On 23 February 2010, Pope Benedict XVI accepted Romero Cabrera's resignation from the pastoral government of the Diocese of Canelones in accordance with Canon 401 §1 of the 1983 Code of Canon Law. He was succeeded as bishop of Canelones by Alberto Sanguinetti Montero.

He has since been styled Bishop Emeritus of Canelones. In 2017, the Holy See listed him among the bishops emeriti accompanying the Episcopal Conference of Uruguay during its ad limina visit.
