= Luis del Castillo Estrada =

Uruguayan Roman Catholic prelate (1935–2026)

Luis Serapio del Castillo Estrada S.J.
- Bishop Emeritus of Melo
- Church: Catholic Church
- Archdiocese: Montevideo
- Diocese: Melo
- Appointed: 21 December 1999
- Retired: 13 June 2009
- Predecessor: Nicolás Cotugno
- Successor: Heriberto Bodeant
- Previous posts: Titular Bishop of Tarasa in Numidia (1988–1999); Auxiliary bishop of Montevideo (1988–1999)

Orders
- Ordination: 30 July 1966
- Consecration: 11 June 1988 by José Gottardi Cristelli

Personal details
- Born: Luis Serapio del Castillo Estrada; 21 June 1935 Montevideo, Uruguay
- Died: 4 March 2026 (aged 90)
- Denomination: Roman Catholic
- Residence: Montevideo, Uruguay

Luis Serapio del Castillo Estrada, S.J. (21 June 1935 – 4 March 2026) was a Uruguayan Roman Catholic prelate.

== Biography ==
Luis del Castillo was ordained priest on 30 July 1966 in the Society of Jesus.

On 9 April 1988, he was appointed titular bishop of Tarasa in Numidia and auxiliary bishop of Montevideo.

He was appointed Bishop of Melo on 21 December 1999, a post he held for almost a decade. He had to resign on 13 June 2009 due to illness.

Del Castillo Estrada died on 4 March 2026, at the age of 90.

Catholic Church titles
Preceded by Nicolás Cotugno	Bishop of Melo; 1999–2009	Succeeded by Heriberto Bodeant
Preceded by Antonino Pinci	Titular Bishop of Tarasa in Numidia; 1988–1999	Succeeded by Artur Grzegorz Miziński
Preceded by —	Auxiliary Bishop of Montevideo; 1988–1999	Succeeded by —
