= Antonio María Barbieri =

Uruguayan cardinal

His Eminence Antonio María Barbieri OFMCap
- Archbishop of Montevideo
- Church: Roman Catholic Church
- Archdiocese: Montevideo
- See: Montevideo
- Appointed: 20 November 1940
- Term ended: 17 November 1976
- Predecessor: Juan Francisco Aragone
- Successor: Carlos Parteli Keller
- Other post: Cardinal-Priest of San Crisogono (1958–79)
- Previous posts: Titular Archbishop of Macra (1936–40); Coadjutor Archbishop of Montevideo (1936–40); President of the Uruguayan Episcopal Conference (1958–66)

Orders
- Ordination: 17 December 1921
- Consecration: 8 November 1936 by Filippo Cortesi
- Created cardinal: 15 December 1958 by Pope John XXIII
- Rank: Cardinal-Priest

Personal details
- Born: Alfredo Barbieri; 12 October 1892 Montevideo, Uruguay
- Died: 6 July 1979 (aged 86) Montevideo, Uruguay
- Buried: Montevideo Cathedral
- Parents: José Barbieri; Mariana Romano
- Education: Pontifical Gregorian University
- Motto: Tuum regnum adveniat

Styles of Antonio María Barbieri
- Reference style: His Eminence
- Spoken style: Your Eminence
- Informal style: Cardinal
- See: Montevideo

Antonio María Barbieri, OFMCap (October 12, 1892 – July 6, 1979), born Alfredo Barbieri, was an Uruguayan cardinal of the Catholic Church. He served as Archbishop of Montevideo from 1940 to 1976, and was elevated to the rank of cardinal.

== Biography ==
Alfredo Barbieri was born in Montevideo to José and Mariana (née Romano) Barbieri. He had a hesitant start to his ecclesiastical career as his parents were strongly opposed to his becoming a priest. Before entering the consecrated life. Barbieri worked as an insurance clerk. He joined the Order of Friars Minor Capuchin on December 8, 1913, and was later sent to Genoa, Italy, to continue his novitiate in 1915. Receiving the habit on the following September 8, Barbieri made his solemn vows and took the name Antonio María.

He then attended Capuchin houses of study and the Pontifical Gregorian University in Rome. Barbieri was ordained on December 17, 1921, and obtained his doctorate in theology from the Gregorian on July 9, 1923. He declined a professorship at a prestigious university in Rome and returned to Uruguay, where he served as a pastor in the local Capuchin friary. He was elected superior of this mission in 1931 and re-elected five years later.

On October 6, 1936, Barbieri was appointed coadjutor bishop of Montevideo and titular bishop of Macra. He was consecrated on the following November 8 by Archbishop Filippo, with Archbishop Giovanni Aragone and Bishop Alfredo Violas serving as co-consecrators.

Barbieri succeeded Aragone as Archbishop of Montevideo on November 20, 1940. Besides his skill in theology, he was also a noted historian, violinist, and essayist. Barbieri was a close associate of Carlos Carmelo Vasconcellos Motta when the first episcopal conferences of Latin American bishops began in the mid-1950s. Pope John XXIII created Barbieri cardinal priest of S. Crisogno in the consistory of December 15, 1958, and he thus became the first Uruguayan cardinal.

He was one of the cardinal electors in the 1963 conclave, participated in the Second Vatican Council (1962–1965), and during the 1960s was recognized for his long periods of service as a theologian and historian with his promotion to the Instituto Histórico y Geográfico del Uruguay (Historical and Geographical Institute of Uruguay). Barbieri resigned as Montevideo's archbishop on November 17, 1976, after thirty-five years of service. He died on July 6, 1979, at age 86.

In addition to his knowledge of theology, he was a notable historian (member of the Historical and Geographical Institute of Uruguay), violinist, and essayist. He used to address the faithful from a radio programme on Radio Jackson.

Catholic Church titles
Preceded by Giovanni Francesco Aragone	Archbishop of Montevideo; 1940–1976	Succeeded by Carlos Parteli Keller
