= Archdiocese of Montevideo =

Latin Catholic archdiocese in Uruguay

Coordinates: 34.9071°S 56.2046°W

Archdiocese of Montevideo Archidioecesis Montisvidei Arquidiócesis de Montevideo

Catholic
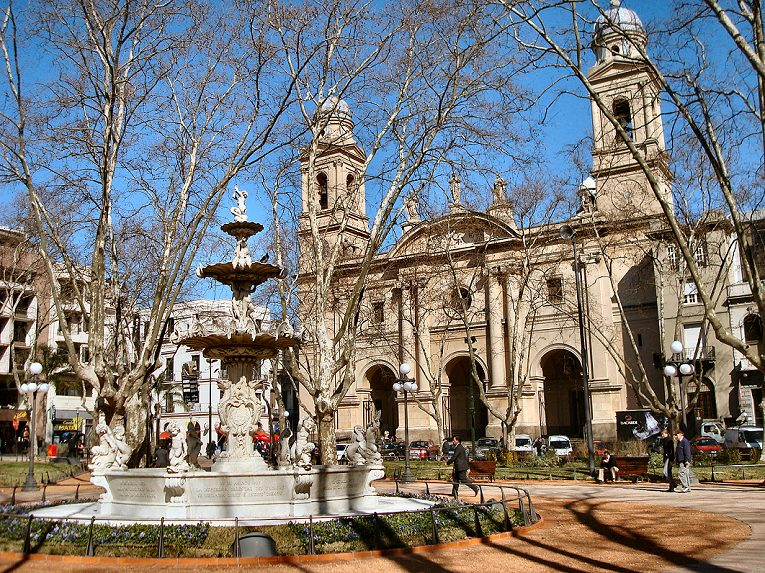
- Cathedral of the Immaculate Conception, St. Philip and St. James

Location
- Country: Uruguay
- Ecclesiastical province: Montevideo

Statistics
- Area: 540 km^{2} (210 sq mi)
- Population: Total; Catholics: (as of 2004); 1,350,000; 850,000 (63%)
- Parishes: 77

Information
- Denomination: Catholic Church
- Rite: Roman Rite
- Established: 14 August 1832 (194 years ago)
- Cathedral: Catedral de la Inmaculada Concepción y San Felipe y Santiago

Current leadership
- Pope: Leo XIV
- Archbishop: Daniel Fernando Sturla Berhouet, S.D.B.
- Auxiliary Bishops: Luis Eduardo González Cedrés
- Bishops emeritus: Nicolás Cotugno Fanizzi, S.D.B.

Map
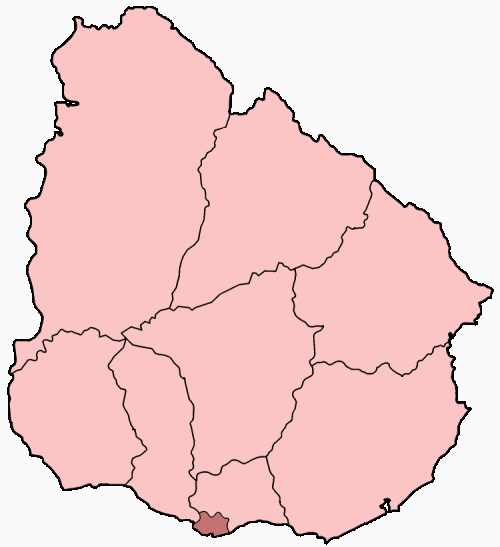

Website
- www.arquidiocesis.net

The Archdiocese of Montevideo (Latin: Archidioecesis Montisvidei) is an archdiocese of the Latin Church of the Catholic Church in Uruguay.

== History ==
Erected as the Apostolic Vicariate of Montevideo by Pope Gregory XVI on 14 August 1832, the vicariate was promoted to the Diocese of Montevideo on 13 July 1878 by Pope Leo XIII. It was elevated to the rank of a metropolitan archdiocese on 14 April 1897.

The new archdiocese became the Metropolitan of the suffragan sees: Canelones, Florida, Maldonado–Punta del Este, Melo, Mercedes, Minas, Salto, San José de Mayo, Tacuarembó.

Montevideo is the only archdiocese in Uruguay and its archbishop is thus seen as leader of the Uruguayan Church. The archdiocese's mother church and thus seat of its archbishop is the Montevideo Metropolitan Cathedral.

The current archbishop of Montevideo is Daniel Sturla, SDB, who was installed on 9 March 2014. A year later he was created Cardinal by Pope Francis.

== Organization ==
The Archdiocese is subdivided into ten pastoral zones.

== Bishops ==
=== List of Ordinaries of Montevideo ===
- Pedro Alcántara Jiménez, OPraem (1830–1843)
- Jacinto Vera y Durán (1859–1881)
- Inocencio María Yéregui (1881–1890)
- Mariano Soler (1891–1908)
- Juan Francisco Aragone (1919–1940)
- Antonio María Barbieri, OFM Cap (1940–1976) (Cardinal in 1958)
- Carlos Parteli Keller (1976–1985)
- José Gottardi Cristelli, SDB (1985–1998)
- Nicolás Cotugno Fanizzi, SDB (1998–2014)
- Daniel Fernando Sturla Berhouet, SDB (2014 – ) (Cardinal in 2015)

=== Coadjutor archbishops ===
- Antonio María (Alfredo) Barbieri, O.F.M. Cap. (1936-1940); future Cardinal
- Carlos Parteli Keller (1966-1976)

=== Auxiliary bishops ===
- Innocenzo María Yéregui (1881), appointed Bishop here
- Ricardo Isaza y Goyechea (1891-1929)
- Pio Gaetano Secondo Stella (1893-1927)
- Antonio Corso (1958-1966), appointed Bishop of Maldonado-Punta del Este
- Miguel Balaguer (1962-1966), appointed Bishop of Tacuarembó
- Andrés María Rubio Garcia, S.D.B. (1968-1975) appointed Bishop of Mercedes
- José Gottardi Cristelli, S.D.B. (1975-1985), appointed Archbishop here
- Raúl Horacio Scarrone Carrero (1982-1987), appointed Bishop of Florid
- Orlando Romero Cabrera (1986-1994), appointed Bishop of Canelones
- Luis del Castillo Estrada, S.J. (1988-1999), appointed Bishop of Melo
- Martín Pablo Pérez Scremini (2004-2008), appointed Bishop of Florida
- Milton Luis Tróccoli Cebedio (2009-2018), appointed Bishop of Maldonado-Punta del Este
- Daniel Fernando Sturla Berhouet, S.D.B. (2011-2014), appointed Archbishop here; future Cardinal
- Luis Eduardo González Cedrés (2018-)
- Pablo Alfonso Jourdán Alvariza (2018-)

=== Other priests of this diocese who became bishops ===
- Enrico Lorenzo Cabrera Urdangarin, appointed Bishop of Mercedes in 1960
- Roberto Reinaldo Cáceres González, appointed Bishop of Melo in 1962
- Rodolfo Pedro Wirz Kraemer, appointed Bishop of Maldonado-Punta del Este in 1985
- Alberto Francisco María Sanguinetti Montero, appointed Bishop of Canelones in 2010
- Martin Lasarte Topolanski S.D.B., appointed Bishop of Lwena, in Angola in 2023.

== See also ==
- List of Catholic dioceses in Uruguay
