= 2021 Copa Libertadores de Futsal =

Copa CONMEBOL Libertadores de Futsal Uruguay 2021

Tournament details
- Host country: Uruguay
- City: Florida
- Dates: 16–22 May 2021
- Teams: 12 (from 10 associations)
- Venue: 1 (in 1 host city)

Final positions
- Champions: (Argentina) San Lorenzo (1st title)
- Runners-up: (Brazil) Carlos Barbosa
- Third place: (Venezuela) Delta Te Quiero
- Fourth place: (Brazil) Corinthians

Tournament statistics
- Matches played: 32
- Goals scored: 151 (4.72 per match)
- Top scorer: (Paraguay) Enmanuel Ayala (9 goals)

The 2021 Copa CONMEBOL Libertadores de Futsal was the 20th edition of the Copa Libertadores de Futsal, South America's premier club futsal tournament organized by CONMEBOL. The tournament was held in Florida, Uruguay between 16 and 22 May 2021.

The tournament was originally scheduled to be played from 1 to 8 May 2021, but was rescheduled from 15 to 22 May at request of the Local Organizing Committee. However, the start date was delayed to 16 May due to problems with the teams' flights and permits to enter the host country.

Carlos Barbosa were the defending champions.

== Teams ==
The competition was contested by 12 teams: the title holders, one entry from each of the ten CONMEBOL associations, plus an additional entry from the host association.

Association	Team	Qualification method
Argentina	San Lorenzo	2021 Copa Libertadores qualification play-off winners.
Bolivia	Proyecto Latín	2019 Liga Nacional de Futsal champions.
Brazil	Carlos Barbosa (holders)	2019 Copa Libertadores champions.
Brazil	Corinthians	2021 Supercopa – Edição Especial winners.
Chile	Universidad de Chile	2019 Campeonato Nacional Primera División Clausura champions.
Colombia	Alianza Platanera	2019 Liga Nacional de Futsal champions.
Ecuador	Sportivo Bocca	2019 Liga Nacional de Futsal champions.
Paraguay	Cerro Porteño	2019 Campeonato de Futsal champions.
Peru	Universitario	2019 Liga Futsal Pro Primera División champions.
Uruguay (hosts)	Peñarol	2019 Liga Uruguaya de Fútbol Sala champions.
Uruguay (hosts)	Nacional	2019 Liga Uruguaya de Fútbol Sala runners-up.
Venezuela	Delta Te Quiero	2020 Liga Nacional de Futsal champions.

Notes

1. Brazil (BRA): Given that the 2020 Copa Libertadores de Futsal was cancelled, the Brazilian Futsal Confederation decided that the 2021 Brazil berth would be awarded to the winners of a play-off between the 2020 and 2021 Supercopa de futsal champions (Corinthians and Magnus Futsal respectively).
2. Chile (CHI): On 4 February 2021, the ANFP decided that the Chile berth, originally awarded to the 2019 Supercopa de Futsal champions, would be awarded to the 2019 Campeonato Clausura champions given that the 2019 Supercopa to be played between 2019 Campeonato Apertura champions (Santiago Wanderers) and 2019 Campeonato Clausura champions (Universidad de Chile) would not be held due to the Santiago Wanderers' futsal team closure.

== Venues ==
The tournament was played at the Polideportivo 10 de Julio in Florida, Uruguay.

== Draw ==
The draw of the tournament was held on 27 April 2021, 12:00 UYT (UTC−3). The draw was conducted based on Regulations Article 16 as follows:

Initially, three teams were seeded and assigned to the head of the groups (Carlos Barbosa automatically to Group A, the others two via a draw from pot 1):

- To Group A: as 2019 Copa Libertadores champions, Carlos Barbosa (Brazil)
- To Group B: as champions of the host association, Peñarol (Uruguay)
- To Group C: as the representative of the runner-up national association of the 2019 Copa Libertadores, Cerro Porteño (Paraguay)

The remaining nine teams were split into three pots of three based on the final placement of their national association's club in the previous edition of the championship, with the highest three (Colombia, Peru and Brazil) placed in Pot 2, the next three (Vanezuela, Argentina and Chile) placed in Pot 3 and the lowest two (Bolivia and Ecuador) in pot 4, alongside the additional Uruguayan club. From each pot, the first team drawn was placed into Group A, the second team drawn placed into Group B and the final team drawn placed into Group C. Clubs from the same association could not be drawn into the same group.

Pot 1 (seeds)	Pot 2	Pot 3	Pot 4
(Uruguay) Peñarol; (Paraguay) Cerro Porteño	(Colombia) Alianza Platanera; (Peru) Universitario; (Brazil) Corinthians	(Venezuela) Delta Te Quiero; (Argentina) San Lorenzo; Universidad de Chile	(Bolivia) Proyecto Latín; (Ecuador) Sportivo Bocca; (Uruguay) Nacional

The draw resulted in the following groups:

Group A
Pos	Team
A1	(Brazil) Carlos Barbosa
A2	(Peru) Universitario
A3	(Argentina) San Lorenzo
A4	(Ecuador) Sportivo Bocca

Group B
Pos	Team
B1	(Uruguay) Peñarol
B2	(Brazil) Corinthians
B3	(Venezuela) Delta Te Quiero
B4	(Bolivia) Proyecto Latín

Group C
Pos	Team
C1	(Paraguay) Cerro Porteño
C2	(Colombia) Alianza Platanera
C3	Universidad de Chile
C4	(Uruguay) Nacional

== Squads ==
Each team has to submit a squad of 14 players, including a minimum of two goalkeepers.

== Group stage ==
The top two teams of each group and the two best third-placed teams advance to the quarter-finals.

Tiebreakers

The teams are ranked according to points (3 points for a win, 1 point for a draw, 0 points for a loss). If tied on points, tiebreakers are applied in the following order (Regulations Article 21):

1. Results in head-to-head matches between tied teams (points, goal difference, goals scored);
2. Goal difference in all matches;
3. Goals scored in all matches;
4. Drawing of lots.

All times are local, UYT (UTC−3).

=== Group A ===
Pos	Team	Pld	W	D	L	GF	GA	GD	Pts	Qualification
1	(Brazil) Carlos Barbosa	3	3	0	0	13	1	+12	9	Knockout stage
2	(Argentina) San Lorenzo	3	1	1	1	6	4	+2	4	Knockout stage
3	(Peru) Universitario	3	1	1	1	6	6	0	4	Knockout stage
4	(Ecuador) Sportivo Bocca	3	0	0	3	4	18	−14	0	Eleventh place play-off

Source: CONMEBOL
Rules for classification: Group stage tiebreakers
16 May 2021
10:00

San Lorenzo (Argentina)	5–2	(Ecuador) Sportivo Bocca
Mariano Cardone; Tomas Pescio; Juan Manuel Rodríguez	Report	Luis Jose Alcivar; Richar Henderson Gutiérrez

Polideportivo 10 de Julio, Florida
Referee: Henry Gutierrez (Bolivia)
16 May 2021
12:00

Carlos Barbosa (Brazil)	3–1	(Peru) Universitario
Pedro Rei Duarte; Fernando Montardo Trindade; André "Keko" Thiago Grahl	Report	Jorge Aguilar

Polideportivo 10 de Julio, Florida
Referee: Carlos Martínez (Paraguay)

17 May 2021
10:00

Universitario (Peru)	4–2	(Ecuador) Sportivo Bocca
Manuel Millares; Jorge Aguilar; Angello Paipay	Report	Jordan Jose Mercado; Richard Henderson Gutierrez

Polideportivo 10 de Julio, Florida
Referee: Andrés Martínez (Uruguay)
17 May 2021
12:00

Carlos Barbosa (Brazil)	1–0	(Argentina) San Lorenzo
Murilo Saad	Report

Polideportivo 10 de Julio, Florida
Referee: Daniel Rodríguez (Uruguay)

18 May 2021
10:00

Universitario (Peru)	1–1	(Argentina) San Lorenzo
Angello Paipay	Report	Mariano Cardone

Polideportivo 10 de Julio, Florida
Referee: Valeria Palma (Chile)
18 May 2021
12:00

Sportivo Bocca (Ecuador)	0–9	(Brazil) Carlos Barbosa
	Report	Pedro Carioca; Jonathan Silva; Murilo Saad; Vini (o.g.) Alejandro Nazareno

Polideportivo 10 de Julio, Florida
Referee: Carlos Martínez (Paraguay)

=== Group B ===
Pos	Team	Pld	W	D	L	GF	GA	GD	Pts	Qualification
1	(Brazil) Corinthians	3	2	1	0	11	2	+9	7	Knockout stage
2	(Venezuela) Delta Te Quiero	3	2	1	0	8	2	+6	7	Knockout stage
3	(Uruguay) Peñarol (H)	3	1	0	2	4	4	0	3	Knockout stage
4	(Bolivia) Proyecto Latin	3	0	0	3	2	17	−15	0	Eleventh place play-off

Source: CONMEBOL
Rules for classification: Group stage tiebreakers
(H) Hosts
16 May 2021
14:00

Delta Te Quiero (Venezuela)	4–1	(Bolivia) Proyecto Latin
Nelson Bello; Wilmer Ronaldo Cabarcas; Jean José Trujillo	Report	Javier Pinto

Polideportivo 10 de Julio, Florida
Referee: Yuri García (Colombia)
16 May 2021
16:00

Peñarol (Uruguay)	0–1	(Brazil) Corinthians
	Report	2' Renato Piau De Sa

Polideportivo 10 de Julio, Florida
Referee: Darío Santamaría (Argentina)

17 May 2021
14:00

Corinthians (Brazil)	9–1	(Bolivia) Proyecto Latin
Guilherme; Fernando; Tatinho; Deives; Jefferson; Jackson; Rabisco; Eder Lima	Report	Alan Daniel Valda

Polideportivo 10 de Julio, Florida
Referee: Estefania Pinto (Argentina)
17 May 2021
16:00

Peñarol (Uruguay)	0–3	(Venezuela) Delta Te Quiero
	Report	Jorge Preciado; Carlos Jiménez; Wilmer Ronaldo Cabarcas

Polideportivo 10 de Julio, Florida
Referee: Christian Espíndola (Chile)

18 May 2021
14:00

Corinthians (Brazil)	1–1	(Venezuela) Delta Te Quiero
Daniel Batalha	Report	Carlos Sanz

Polideportivo 10 de Julio, Florida
Referee: Jonhatan Herbás (Ecuador)
18 May 2021
16:00

Proyecto Latin (Bolivia)	0–4	(Uruguay) Peñarol
	Report	Leandro Ataides; Ignacio Salgues; Richard Catardo

Polideportivo 10 de Julio, Florida
Referee: José Ocampo (Paraguay)

=== Group C ===
Pos	Team	Pld	W	D	L	GF	GA	GD	Pts	Qualification
1	(Colombia) Alianza Platanera (Note: Alianza Platanera and Cerro Porteño tied on head-to-head result, goal difference, and goals scored in all matches. A drawing of lots decided the final position of both teams.)	3	2	1	0	7	2	+5	7	Knockout stage
2	(Paraguay) Cerro Porteño	3	2	1	0	7	2	+5	7	Knockout stage
3	Universidad de Chile	3	1	0	2	6	10	−4	3	Ninth place play-off
4	(Uruguay) Nacional (H)	3	0	0	3	4	10	−6	0	Ninth place play-off

Source: CONMEBOL
Rules for classification: Group stage tiebreakers
(H) Hosts
Notes:
16 May 2021
18:00

Cerro Porteño (Paraguay)	0–0	(Colombia) Alianza Platanera
	Report

Polideportivo 10 de Julio, Florida
Referee: Gean Telles (Brazil)
16 May 2021
20:00

Universidad de Chile	4–2	(Uruguay) Nacional
Franco Luxardo; Frank Carrasco; David Ortiz; Eduardo Araya	Report	Joaquin Varietti; Facundo Abad

Polideportivo 10 de Julio, Florida
Referee: Leandro Lorenzo (Argentina)

17 May 2021
18:00

Cerro Porteño (Paraguay)	4–1	Universidad de Chile
Enmanuel Ayala; Francisco Martínez; Agustin Cafure	Report	Frank Carrasco

Polideportivo 10 de Julio, Florida
Referee: Anelize Schulz (Brazil)
17 May 2021
20:00

Alianza Platanera (Colombia)	3–1	(Uruguay) Nacional
Jeison Padilla; Jefferson Moreno; Daniel Gallego	Report	Joaquin Varietti

Polideportivo 10 de Julio, Florida
Referee: Ricardo Messa (Brazil)

18 May 2021
18:00

Nacional (Uruguay)	1–3	(Paraguay) Cerro Porteño
Sebastian Noy	Report	Enmanuel Ayala

Polideportivo 10 de Julio, Florida
Referee: Rolly Rojas (Peru)
18 May 2021
20:00

Alianza Platanera (Colombia)	4–1	Universidad de Chile
Juan Zapata; Daniel Gallego; José Tangarife		Nicolás Chacón

Polideportivo 10 de Julio, Florida
Referee: José Villar (Venezuela)

=== Ranking of third-placed teams ===
Pos	Grp	Team	Pld	W	D	L	GF	GA	GD	Pts	Qualification
1	A	(Peru) Universitario	3	1	1	1	6	6	0	4	Knockout stage
2	B	(Uruguay) Peñarol	3	1	0	2	4	4	0	3	Knockout stage
3	C	Universidad de Chile	3	1	0	2	6	10	−4	3	Ninth place play-off

Source: CONMEBOL
Rules for classification: 1) Points; 2) Goal difference; 3) Goals scored; 4) Draw.

=== Ranking of fourth-placed teams ===
Pos	Grp	Team	Pld	W	D	L	GF	GA	GD	Pts	Qualification
1	C	(Uruguay) Nacional	3	0	0	3	4	10	−6	0	Ninth place play-off
2	A	(Ecuador) Sportivo Bocca	3	0	0	3	4	18	−14	0	Eleventh place play-off
3	B	(Bolivia) Proyecto Latin	3	0	0	3	2	17	−15	0	Eleventh place play-off

Source: CONMEBOL
Rules for classification: 1) Points; 2) Goal difference; 3) Goals scored; 4) Draw.

== Final stage ==
In the quarter-finals, semi-finals and final, extra time and penalty shoot-out would be used to decide the winner if necessary (no extra time would be used in the play-offs for third to twelfth place).

=== Bracket ===
The quarter-final matchups are:

- QF1: Winner Group A vs. 2nd Best Third Place
- QF2: Winner Group B vs. 1st Best Third Place
- QF3: Winner Group C vs. Runner-up Group A
- QF4: Runner-up Group B vs. Runner-up Group C

The semi-final matchups are:

- SF1: Winner QF1 vs. Winner QF4
- SF2: Winner QF2 vs. Winner QF3

5th place match
21 May
(Paraguay) Cerro Porteño	1
(Peru) Universitario	4
7th place match
21 May
(Uruguay) Peñarol	1
(Colombia) Alianza Platanera	4

5th–8th place semi-finals
20 May
(Uruguay) Peñarol	4 (1)
(Paraguay) Cerro Porteño (p)	4 (4)
20 May
(Peru) Universitario (a)	5
(Colombia) Alianza Platanera	0

Quarterfinals
19 May
(Brazil) Carlos Barbosa	3
(Uruguay) Peñarol	0
19 May
(Venezuela) Delta Te Quiero	9
(Paraguay) Cerro Porteño	5
19 May
(Brazil) Corinthians	3
(Peru) Universitario	0
19 May
(Colombia) Alianza Platanera	0
(Argentina) San Lorenzo	4

Semifinals
21 May
(Brazil) Carlos Barbosa	4
(Venezuela) Delta Te Quiero	0
21 May
(Brazil) Corinthians	1
(Argentina) San Lorenzo	2

Final
22 May
(Brazil) Carlos Barbosa	3
(Argentina) San Lorenzo (a.e.t.)	4
3rd place match
22 May
(Venezuela) Delta Te Quiero	3
(Brazil) Corinthians	1

11th place match
20 May
(Ecuador) Sportivo Bocca	4
(Bolivia) Proyecto Latin	0

9th place match
20 May
Universidad de Chile	3
(Uruguay) Nacional	1

=== Quarter-finals ===
19 May 2021
12:00

Carlos Barbosa (Brazil)	3–0	(Uruguay) Peñarol
Murilo Saad	Report

Polideportivo 10 de Julio, Florida
Referee: Darío Santamaría (Argentina)

19 May 2021
14:00

Corinthians (Brazil)	3–0	(Peru) Universitario
Henrique; Tatinho	Report

Polideportivo 10 de Julio, Florida
Referee: Daniel Rodríguez (Uruguay)

19 May 2021
16:00

Alianza Platanera (Colombia)	0–4	(Argentina) San Lorenzo
	Report	Tomás Pescio (o.g.) Jonathan Toro; Lucas Bolo; Mariano Cardone

Polideportivo 10 de Julio, Florida
Referee: Ricardo Messa (Brazil)

19 May 2021
18:00

Delta Te Quiero (Venezuela)	9–5	(Paraguay) Cerro Porteño
Nelson Bello; Carlos Sanz; Jorge Preciado; Jairo Añez; Chavela Vidal	Report	(o.g.) Wilmer Ronaldo Cabarcas; Enmanuel Ayala; Jorge Espinoza; Francisco Martínez; Alan Rojas

Polideportivo 10 de Julio, Florida
Referee: Christian Espíndola (Chile)

=== Semi-finals ===
==== 5th–8th place ====
20 May 2021
16:00

Peñarol (Uruguay)	4–4	(Paraguay) Cerro Porteño
Nicolás Martínez; Ignacio Salgués	Report	Francisco Martínez; Enmanuel Ayala
Penalties
Nicolás Martínez (penalty missed); Matías Fernández (penalty scored); Ignacio Salgués (penalty missed)	1–4	(penalty scored) Rubén Darío Benitez; (penalty scored) Francisco Martínez; (penalty scored) Rodolfo Román; (penalty scored) Enmanuel Ayala

Polideportivo 10 de Julio, Florida
Referee: Yuri García (Colombia)

20 May 2021
18:00

Universitario (Peru)	5–0 Awarded (Note: The CONMEBOL Disciplinary Court awarded Universitario a 5–0 win as a result of Alianza Platanera appeared with a different equipment than previously agreed.)	(Colombia) Alianza Platanera
	Report

Polideportivo 10 de Julio, Florida
Referee: Andrés Martínez (Uruguay)

==== 1st–4th place ====
21 May 2021
16:00

Carlos Barbosa (Brazil)	4–0	(Venezuela) Delta Te Quiero
Richard; Murilo Saad; Pedro Rei; Dener	Report

Polideportivo 10 de Julio, Florida
Referee: Carlos Martínez (Paraguay)

21 May 2021
18:00

Corinthians (Brazil)	1–2	(Argentina) San Lorenzo
Daniel Batalha	Report	Jorge Cuervo; Damián Stazzone

Polideportivo 10 de Julio, Florida
Referee: Henry Gutierrez (Bolivia)

=== Finals ===
==== 11th place match ====
20 May 2021
12:00

Sportivo Bocca (Ecuador)	4–0	(Bolivia) Proyecto Latin
Diego Muñoz; Jordan Mercado; Alejandro Nazareno; Luis Jose Alcivar	Report

Polideportivo 10 de Julio, Florida
Referee: Tayana Moreno (Venezuela)

==== 9th place match ====
20 May 2021
14:00

Universidad de Chile	3–1	(Uruguay) Nacional
Eduardo Pérez; David Ortiz; Serfan Suárez	Report	Yhordi Segui

Polideportivo 10 de Julio, Florida
Referee: José Ocampo (Paraguay)

==== 7th place match ====
21 May 2021
12:00

Peñarol (Uruguay)	1–4	(Colombia) Alianza Platanera
Leandro Ataídes		Daniel Gallego; Jefferson Moreno; Andrés Medina; Jospe Luis Tangarife

Polideportivo 10 de Julio, Florida
Referee: Ricardo Messa (Brazil)

==== 5th place match ====
21 May 2021
14:00

Cerro Porteño (Paraguay)	1–4	(Peru) Universitario
Rodolfo Román		Roberto Ramos; Angello Paipay; Sebastián Obando; Franco Colán

Polideportivo 10 de Julio, Florida
Referee: José Villar (Venezuela)

==== 3rd place match ====
22 May 2021
18:00

Delta Te Quiero (Venezuela)	3–1	(Brazil) Corinthians
Wilmer Ronaldo Cabarcas; Nelson Bello; Carlos Sanz		Deives Moraes

Polideportivo 10 de Julio, Florida
Referee: Leandro Lorenzo (Argentina)

==== Final ====
22 May 2021
20:00

Carlos Barbosa (Brazil)	3–4 (a.e.t.)	(Argentina) San Lorenzo
Murilo Saad; Dener; Pedro Rei	Report	Tomás Pescio; Juan Rodríguez; Gerardo Menseguez

Polideportivo 10 de Julio, Florida
Referee: Daniel Rodríguez (Uruguay)

== Final ranking ==
Rank	Team
1st place, gold medalist(s)	(Argentina) San Lorenzo
2nd place, silver medalist(s)	(Brazil) Carlos Barbosa
3rd place, bronze medalist(s)	(Venezuela) Delta Te Quiero
4	(Brazil) Corinthians
5	(Peru) Universitario
6	(Paraguay) Cerro Porteño
7	(Colombia) Alianza Platanera
8	(Uruguay) Peñarol
9	Universidad de Chile
10	(Uruguay) Nacional
11	(Ecuador) Sportivo Bocca
12	(Bolivia) Proyecto Latin
