= Alfonso Bauer =

Alfonso Bauer S.D.B.
- Bishop of Florida
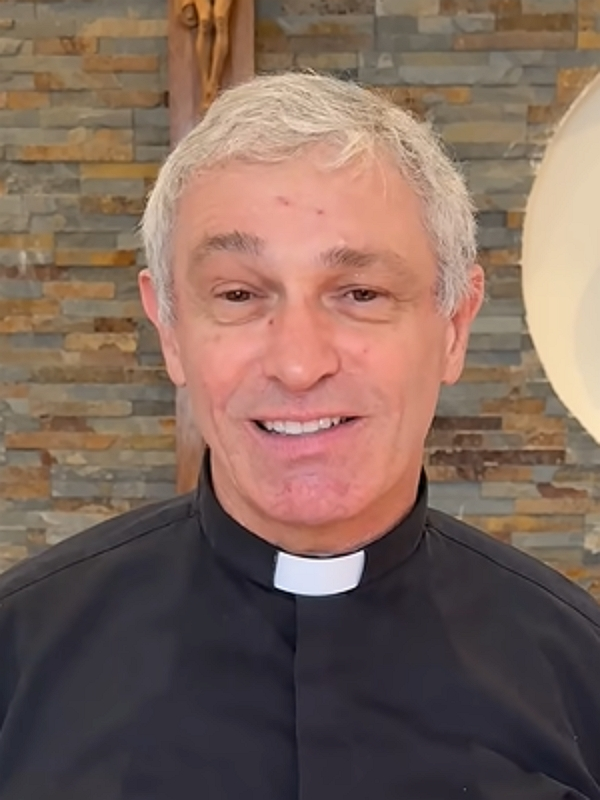
- Bauer in 2026
- Church: Catholic Church
- Diocese: Florida
- Appointed: 19 March 2026
- Predecessor: Martín Pérez Scremini

Orders
- Ordination: 16 November 1996
- Consecration: 31 May 2026 by Daniel Sturla

Personal details
- Born: Alfonso María Bauer Ormazábal; 23 July 1968 (age 58) Montevideo, Uruguay
- Education: Salesian Pontifical University (LTh)
- Coat of arms

Alfonso María Bauer Ormazábal (born 23 July 1968) is a Uruguayan prelate of the Catholic Church who has served as the Bishop of Florida since 2026.
