= Mariano Soler =

Uruguayan cleric

- Archbishop of Montevideo
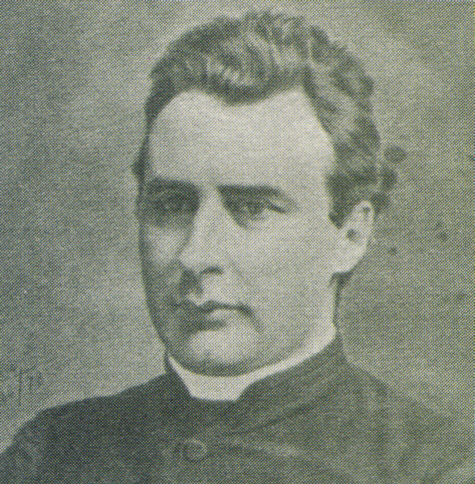
- See: Montevideo
- Appointed: April 19, 1897
- Predecessor: Inocencio María Yéregui
- Successor: Juan Francisco Aragone
- Previous post: Bishop of Montevideo

Orders
- Ordination: December 21, 1872

Personal details
- Born: March 25, 1846 San Carlos, Uruguay
- Died: September 26, 1908 (aged 62) Gibraltar
- Buried: Montevideo Metropolitan Cathedral
- Denomination: Roman Catholic
- Residence: Montevideo
- Education: South American College

Monsignor Dr. Mariano Soler (born 25 March 1846 in San Carlos - deceased 26 September 1908 in Gibraltar) was a Uruguayan cleric and the first Roman Catholic archbishop of Montevideo, Uruguay.

A student at the South American College in Rome, he obtained his doctorate in Canon Law.

He was an outstanding intellectual in the area of the scientific and philosophical culture of Uruguay, and a strong defender of the ecclesiastical institutions (i.e., the prerogatives of Roman Catholic church). He was known to be a staunch opponent of the theory of natural selection of Charles Darwin and of Darwinism generally.

He wrote a large number of articles of religious character and served as a lecturer in philosophy. He was also elected a deputy by the department of Canelones Department.

== Biography ==
Soler was born on March 25, 1846, in San Carlos, Maldonado, Uruguay. In his childhood he received instruction from Fr. Angel Singla. Having expressed interest in ecclesiastical instruction in his adolescence, his family allowed him to enter as a pupil of Don's School (headed by Jaime Roldós y Pons) of Montevideo as a seminarian.

He then entered the university, and completed his seminary degree in Santa Fe. He finished his studies in the Pontifical Colegio Pio Latin American of Rome, being ordained priest on December 20, 1872. Later he obtained the title of Doctor in canon law.

Upon returning to Montevideo, he held the positions of Provisor, Prosecutor, the Vicar General of the Diocese and, between 1874 and 1890, the parish priest of the Cord Church.

He became the third bishop of Montevideo, on January 29, 1891, succeeding Monsignor Innocent Maria Yéregui. The Pope Leo XIII transformed Montevideo into an Archbishopric, and, on April 19 of that year, Soler received in Rome the investiture that would make him the first archbishop of Montevideo.

He toured America and Europe, and traveled on six occasions to the Vatican. In 1908, when returning from his last trip to Rome, he became ill from a disease in Italy, and later died in Gibraltar.

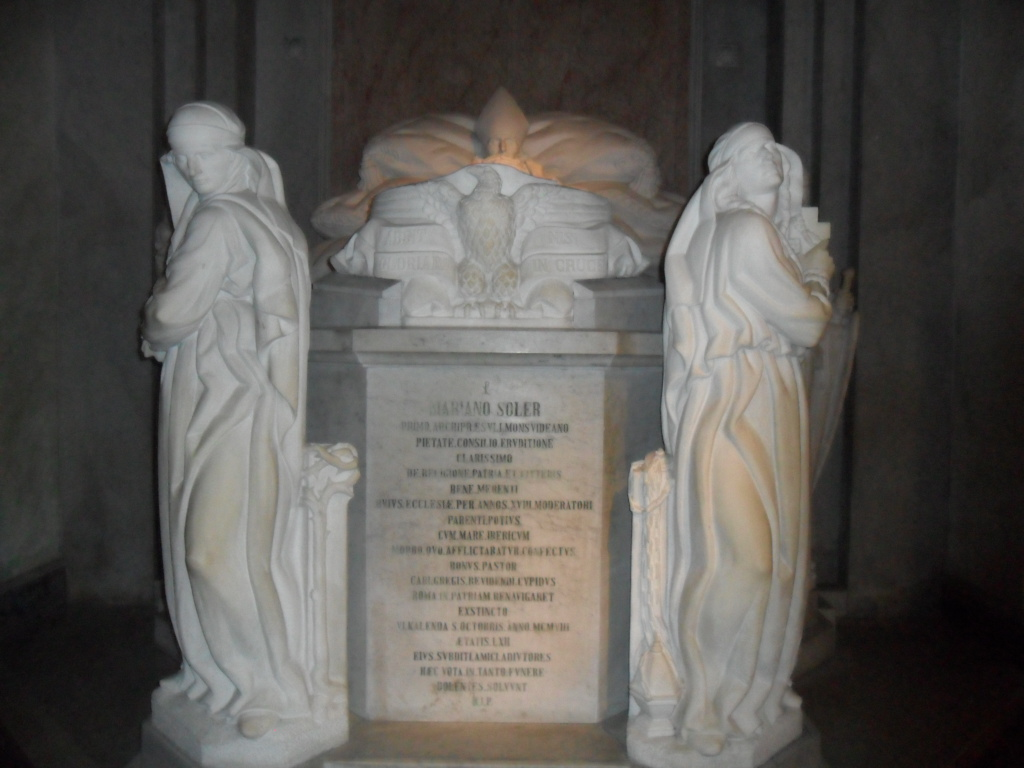
Tomb of Mariano Soler at the Montevideo Metropolitan Cathedral.

He is buried in an ornate tomb inside the Montevideo Metropolitan Cathedral.

== Opposition to evolution ==
Soler was a Christian creationist who criticized Darwin's theory of evolution. Soler defended the Biblical account of creation and argued that it was in accord to findings from science. He argued that the close relationships of birds and reptiles confirms the Genesis creation narrative as both were created on the same day. In 1880, he authored a pamphlet attacking Darwinism from a Biblical perspective. Science historian Thomas F. Glick has noted that Soler's "science was nothing more than a thin patina that covered a religious apology of a genre that had by this time become traditional".

== Selected publications ==
- El darwinismo ante la filosofía de la naturaleza (1880)

== See also ==
- List of Roman Catholic cathedrals in Uruguay
- Roman Catholic Archdiocese of Montevideo
