= Diocese of Florida =

Diocese of Florida may refer to:

- Episcopal Diocese of Florida
- Roman Catholic Diocese of Florida
