= Virgin of the Thirty-Three =

Title of the Virgin Mary and Patroness of Uruguay

Our Lady of the Thirty-Three
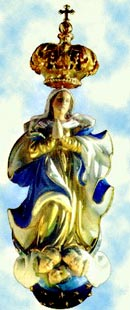

Patroness of Uruguay
- Venerated in: Roman Catholic Church
- Major shrine: Cathedral of Florida, Uruguay
- Attributes: Virgin Mary in the form of the Assumption, white robe, blue cloak, golden bejeweled crown, sliver of moon held by cherubs
- Patronage: Uruguay and Uruguayan people

Our Lady of the Thirty-Three (Spanish: Nuestra Señora de los Treinta y Tres), also known as the Liberator of Uruguay, is a title of the Virgin Mary and the Patroness of Uruguay.

== History ==
This image dates from the 18th century and is of Guarani origin. It was venerated by the Thirty-Three Orientals in 1825. In 1857, one of them, General Manuel Oribe, presented a golden crown as a gift to the Virgin.

On 8 September 1930, Pope Pius XI formally declared Our Lady of Lujan as the Patroness of Uruguay. The Papal document was signed by Cardinal Eugenio Pacelli, the future Pope Pius XII.

In 1962, the image was solemnly crowned by bishop Humberto Tonna. Soon afterwards, Pope John XXIII declared her patron saint of Uruguay.

The image was consecrated by Pope John Paul II in his visit to Uruguay in 1988.

== Devotion ==
The Cathedral of Florida is the shrine where this image is venerated. Ever since the country's independence, there have been pilgrimages to it, for instance, in times of pests. The first National Pilgrimage was in 1908. A very important pilgrimage was carried out by bishop Miguel Paternain in 1945, covering almost one half of the whole country.

A yearly pilgrimage is held every second Sunday of November.

== Places of veneration ==
The Virgin of the Thirty-Three has many churches dedicated to her:

- Cathedral Sanctuary of Our Lady of the Thirty-Three in Florida
- Parish Church of Our Lady of the Thirty-Three in Maldonado
- Parish Church of Our Lady of the Thirty-Three in Treinta y Tres
- Parish Church of Our Lady of the Thirty-Three in Montevideo
- Montevideo Metropolitan Cathedral has an important image of the Virgin of the Thirty-Three

And there are also several chapels devoted to Her in all the country.
