= Cathedral of Melo =

Cathedral in Melo, Uruguay

Coordinates: 32.3746°S 54.1692°W

Catedral de Nuestra Señora del Pilar y San Rafael
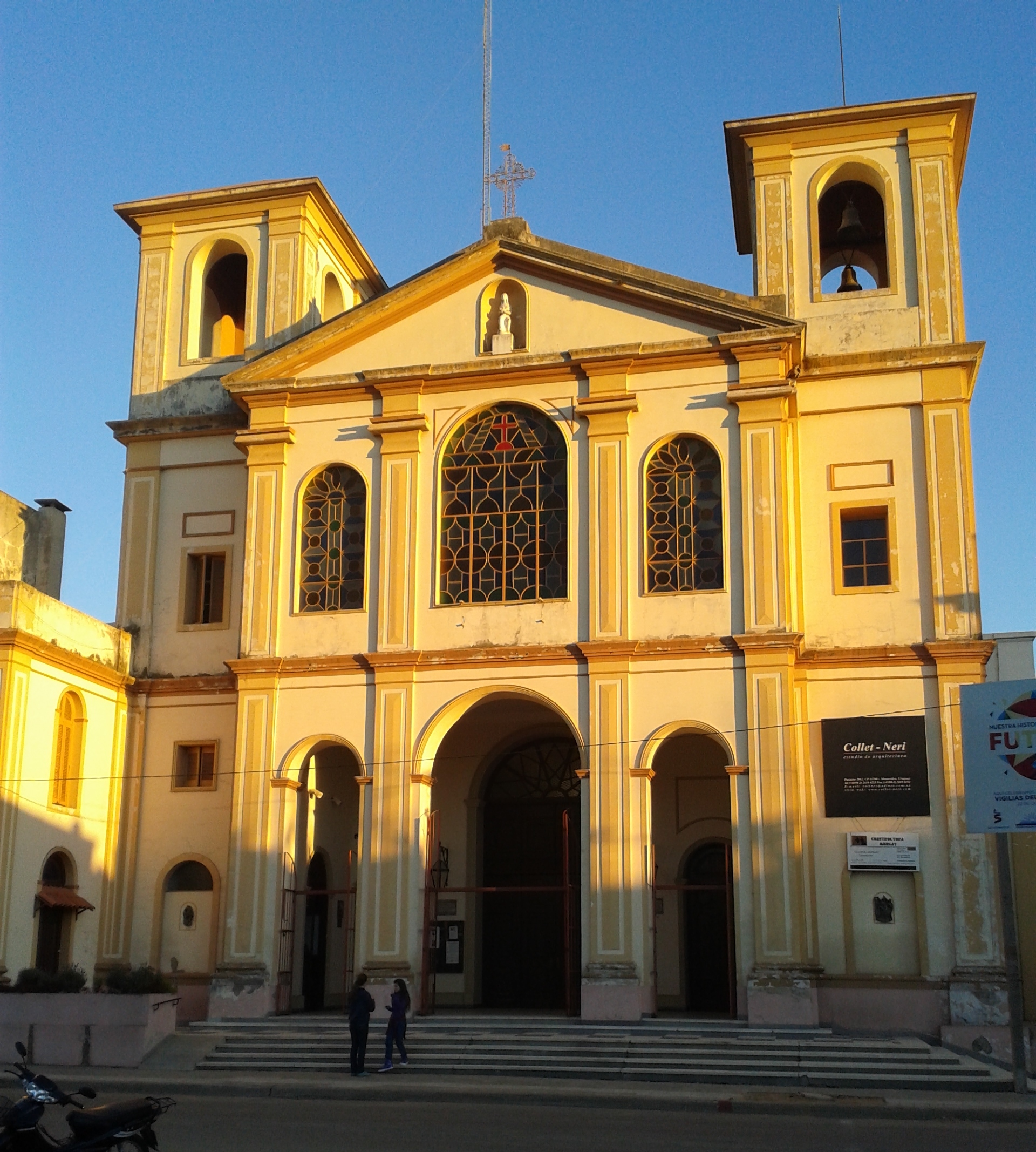

Religion
- Affiliation: Roman Catholic
- Diocese: Diocese of Melo

Location
- Location: Del Pilar y Aparicio Saravia; Melo, Uruguay
- Interactive map of Catedral de Nuestra Señora del Pilar y San Rafael

Architecture
- Completed: 1888

The Cathedral of Our Lady of the Pillar and St. Raphael (Spanish: Catedral de Nuestra Señora del Pilar y San Rafael) is the main Roman Catholic church building of Melo, Uruguay. It is the see of the Roman Catholic Diocese of Melo.

It is dedicated to the Virgin of the Pillar and the Archangel Raphael.

== Visit of John Paul II ==
In 1988, during his second pastoral visit to Uruguay, Pope John Paul II visited this cathedral. This visit inspired the film The Pope's Toilet, which received several awards and was Uruguay's submission to the 80th Academy Awards for the Academy Award for Best Foreign Language Film, although it was not accepted as a nominee.

== See also ==
- List of Roman Catholic cathedrals in Uruguay
- Roman Catholic Diocese of Melo
