= List of Catholic dioceses in North Macedonia =

The Catholic Church in North Macedonia has no national episcopal conference, given its one bishop (for one Latin diocese and one Eastern Catholic diocese), which participates in the International Episcopal Conference of Saints Cyril and Methodius (as do Balkan neighbours Kosovo, Montenegro and Serbia, all also former Yugoslavian constituent republics).

There formally is an Apostolic Nunciature as papal diplomatic representation (embassy-level) to Macedonia, but it's vested in the Apostolic Nunciature to Bulgaria in its capital Sofia

== Current jurisdictions ==
=== Latin see ===
- Diocese of Skopje, suffragan of the Bosnian Archdiocese of Sarajevo (Vrhbosna)

=== Eastern Catholic see ===
Byzantine Rite

- Macedonian Catholic Eparchy of the Assumption of the Blessed Virgin Mary in Strumica-Skopje, diocese (directly subject to the Holy See and its Roman Congregation for the Oriental Churches) and so far vested in the Latin bishopric of Skopje, yet constitutes the only jurisdiction of the Macedonian Catholic (rite- & language-specific) particular church sui iuris

== Defunct jurisdictions ==
Excluding direct predecessors of current sees above

=== Titular see ===
One Metropolitan Titular archbishopric :

- Oc(h)rid(a) = Acrida

=== Defunct Eastern Catholic jurisdictions ===
Byzantine Rite

- Bulgarian Catholic Apostolic Vicariate of Macedonia (also in Greece)

== See also ==
- List of Catholic dioceses (structured view)

== Sources and external links ==
- GCatholic - data for all sections
