= Santa Galla =

- St. Galla (in English); Sancti Gallæ (in Latin)
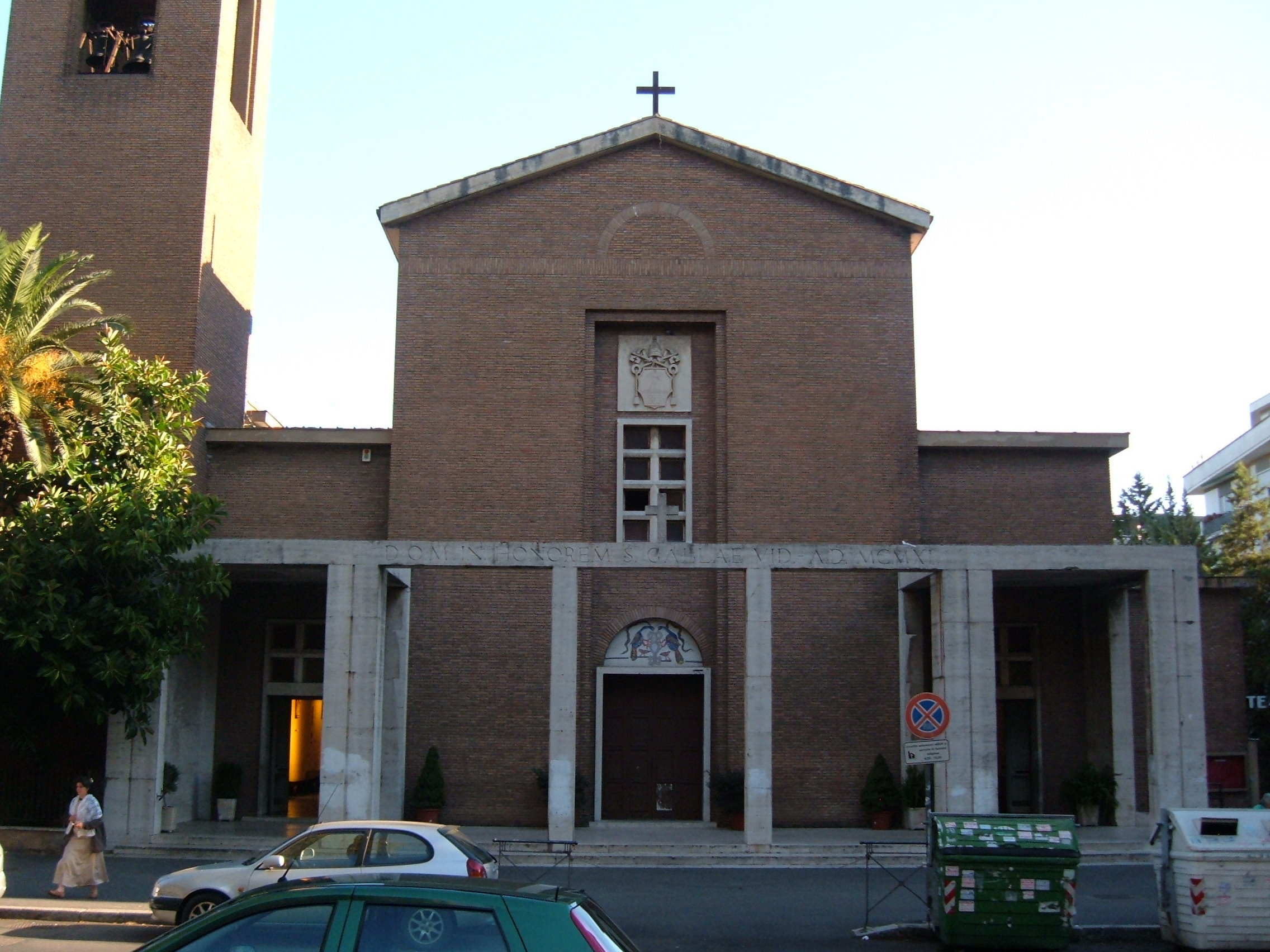
- Facade
- Click on the map for a fullscreen view
- 41°52′04″N 12°29′23″E
- Location: Circonvallazione Ostiense 195, Rome
- Country: Italy
- Denomination: Roman Catholic
- Tradition: Roman Rite
- Website: Official website

History
- Status: Titular church
- Dedication: Galla of Rome
- Consecrated: 1940

Architecture
- Architect: Tullio Rossi
- Architectural type: Church
- Style: Modernist
- Groundbreaking: 1940
- Completed: 1940

The Santa Galla church is a place of Catholic worship in Rome located in the Ostiense district, in via Circonvallazione Ostiense.

== History ==
The ancient church of Santa Galla was demolished in the 1930s for the widening of Via del Teatro Marcello in the Ripa district. The new church was built in 1940, designed by architect Tullio Rossi, and consecrated by Cardinal Ugo Poletti on the 50th anniversary of the parish foundation December 15, 1990. It houses a late XVIIth century painting which was in old S. Galla.

The church is home to parish, established December 13, 1940 with the decree of the Cardinal Vicar Francesco Marchetti Selvaggiani Templum in honorem. It has been visited by two popes: Pope Paul VI March 13, 1966, and Pope John Paul II on 25 January 1981.

Since February 14, 2015, it is the seat of the Cardinal title of Sancti Galle.

== List of Cardinal Protectors ==
- Daniel Fernando Sturla Berhouet 14 February 2015 – present
