= Raúl Horacio Scarrone Carrero =

Uruguayan Roman Catholic bishop (1931–2021)

- Bishop of Florida
- Church: Catholic Church
- Diocese: Diocese of Florida
- In office: 15 June 1987 – 15 March 2008
- Predecessor: Umberto Tonna Zanotta
- Successor: Martín Pérez Scremini
- Previous posts: Titular Bishop of Ulpiana (1982-1987); Auxiliary Bishop of Montevideo (1982-1987)

Orders
- Ordination: 24 September 1955
- Consecration: 12 December 1982 by Carlos Parteli

Personal details
- Born: 18 April 1931 Montevideo, Uruguay
- Died: 4 May 2021 (aged 90)

Raúl Horacio Scarrone Carrero (18 April 1931 – 4 May 2021) was a Uruguayan Roman Catholic bishop.

Scarrone Carrero was born in Uruguay and was ordained to the priesthood in 1955. He served as the auxiliary bishop of the Roman Catholic Archdiocese of Montevideo, Uruguay and titular bishop of Ulpiana from 1982 to 1987, and as the bishop of the Roman Catholic Diocese of Florida, Uruguay.
