= Martín Pérez Scremini =

Uruguayan Roman Catholic prelate (born 1949)

Monsignor Martín Pérez Scremini
- Bishop Emeritus of Florida
- Church: Catholic Church
- Diocese: Florida
- Appointed: 15 March 2008
- Term ended: 19 March 2026
- Predecessor: Raúl Horacio Scarrone Carrero
- Successor: Alfonso Bauer
- Previous posts: Auxiliary Bishop of Montevideo (2004–2008); Titular Bishop of Vazari (2004–2008)

Orders
- Ordination: 14 June 1985
- Consecration: 25 April 2004 by Nicolás Cotugno

Personal details
- Born: Martín Pablo Pérez Scremini; 26 December 1949 (age 76) Montevideo, Uruguay

Martín Pablo Pérez Scremini (born 26 December 1949 in Montevideo) is a Uruguayan Roman Catholic prelate.

He was ordained as a priest in 1985. In 2004 he was appointed auxiliary bishop of Montevideo and titular bishop of Vazari. From 2008 to 2026 he was the bishop of the Roman Catholic Diocese of Florida, Uruguay.
