= List of cathedrals in Uruguay =

This is the list of cathedrals in Uruguay sorted by denomination.

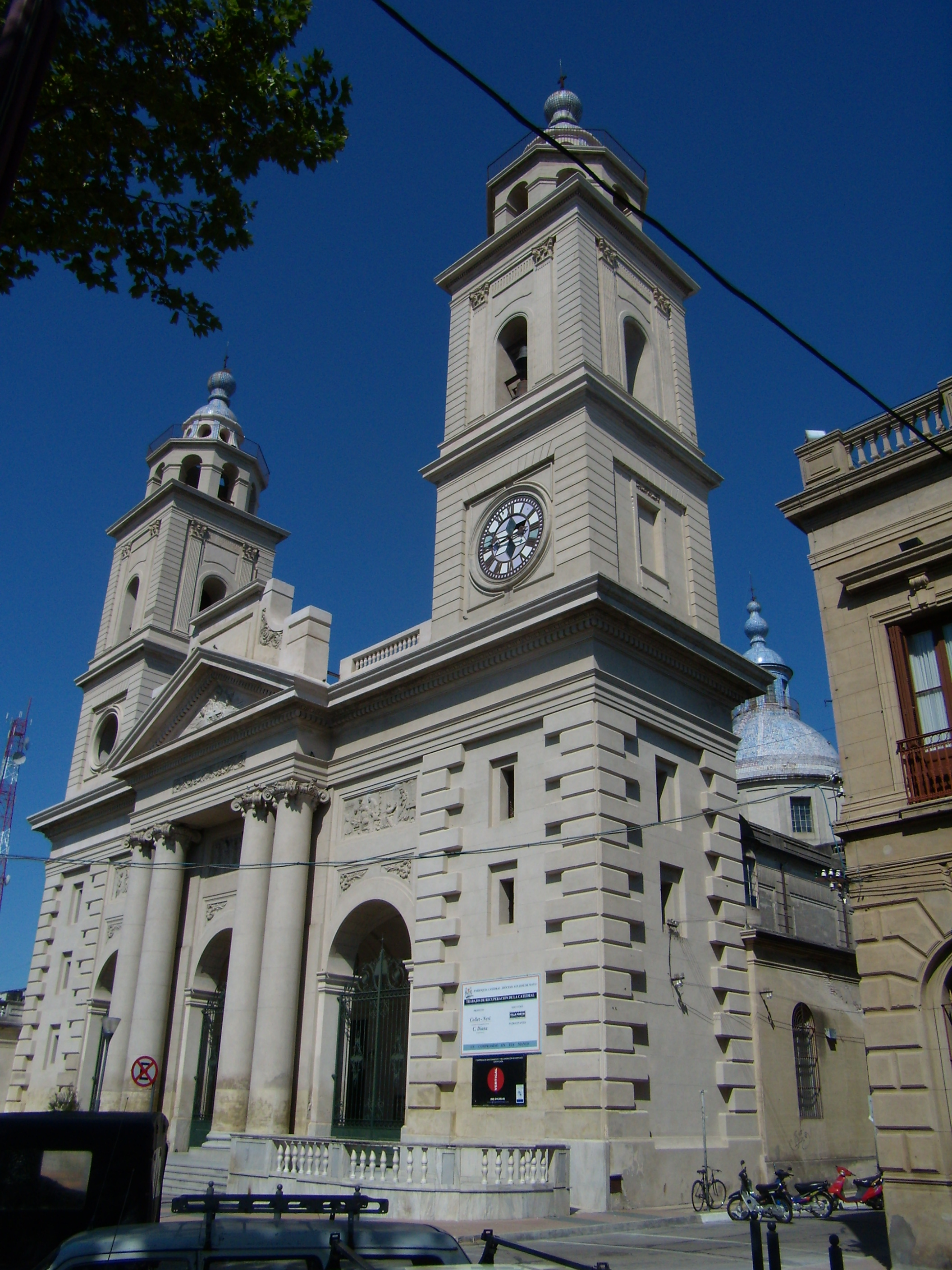
Cathedral Basilica of St. Joseph in San José de Mayo

== Catholic ==
Cathedrals of the Catholic Church in Uruguay:

- Cathedral of Our Lady of Guadalupe in Canelones
- Cathedral Basilica Sanctuary of Our Lady of the Thirty-Three in Florida
- Cathedral of St. Ferdinand in Maldonado
- Cathedral of Our Lady of the Pillar and St. Raphael in Melo
- Cathedral of Our Lady of Mercy in Mercedes
- Cathedral of the Immaculate Conception in Minas
- Cathedral of the Immaculate Conception, St. Philip and St. James in Montevideo
- Cathedral of St. John the Baptist in Salto
- Cathedral Basilica of St. Joseph in San José de Mayo
- Cathedral of St. Fructuosus in Tacuarembó

Cathedrals of the Armenian Catholic Church:

- Cathedral of Our Lady of Bzommar in Montevideo

== Anglican ==
Cathedrals of the Anglican Church of the Southern Cone of America:

- Cathedral of The Most Holy Trinity in Montevideo

== Armenian Apostolic ==
Cathedrals of the Armenian Apostolic Church:

- St. Nerses Shnorhali Church in Montevideo

== See also ==
- List of cathedrals
- List of Catholic churches in Uruguay
- List of Roman Catholic dioceses in Uruguay
