= John XXIII Institute =

- Instituto Juan XXIII

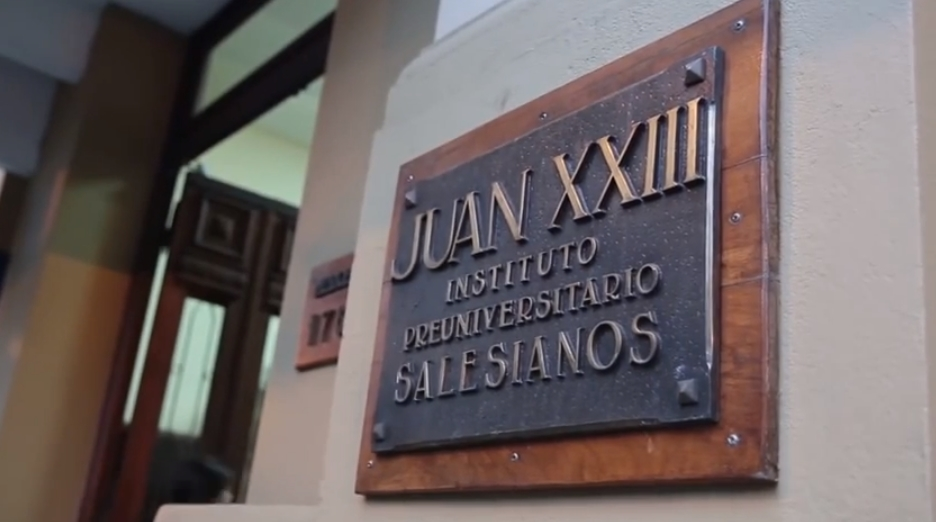
- Plaque at the main entrance of the Institute

Location
- Mercedes St. 1769; Cordón (Montevideo); Uruguay
- Coordinates: 34.9009°S 56.1791°W

Information
- Type: Private, Catholic, College-prep
- Religious affiliation: Catholic Church
- Denomination: Salesians of Don Bosco
- Established: 1964
- Principal: Hugo Espinosa, SDB
- Grades: 10–12
- Gender: Co-educational
- Enrollment: 833 (2013)
- Campus: Urban
- Website: www.juan23.edu.uy

The John XXIII Salesian Institute (Spanish: Instituto Preuniversitario Salesiano Juan XXIII) is a coeducational private Catholic college-preparatory school located in Montevideo, Uruguay.

== History ==
It was founded in 1964 by the Salesian order and members of the Marist Brothers and the Sons of the Holy Family, with the aim of providing a Catholic and private education in the last years of high school.

In the first place, it was intended to name the institution in homage to some outstanding Catholic figure in the History of Uruguay, as the options of Francisco Bauzá or Juan Zorrilla de San Martín were already used by other educational centers, it was decided to name it in honor of Pope John XXIII. Since its founding, the Institute was exclusively for boys; however, in 1973, it began it began admitting girls, becoming a coeducational institution. Years later, the first year of bachillerato (tenth grade) was also added to the curriculum.

== Campus ==
The John XXIII Institute campus is currently located in multiple buildings in the central Cordón neighborhood of Montevideo. The main building dates back to the 19th century, and originally housed the all-men school Colegio del Sagrado Corazón de Jesús (School of the Sacred Heart of Jesus).

== Notable people ==
=== Alumni ===
- Pedro Bordaberry, former Senator of the Republic and presidential candidate.
- Álvaro Delgado, politician.
- Pablo Mieres, politician.
- Victoria Rodríguez, television presenter and actress.
- Daniel Sturla, archbishop of Montevideo.

=== Principals ===
- Daniel Sturla, archbishop of Montevideo.

== See also ==
- Sagrado Corazón, Montevideo
