= Iglesia de la Inmaculada Concepción, Rivera =

Church in Rivera, Uruguay

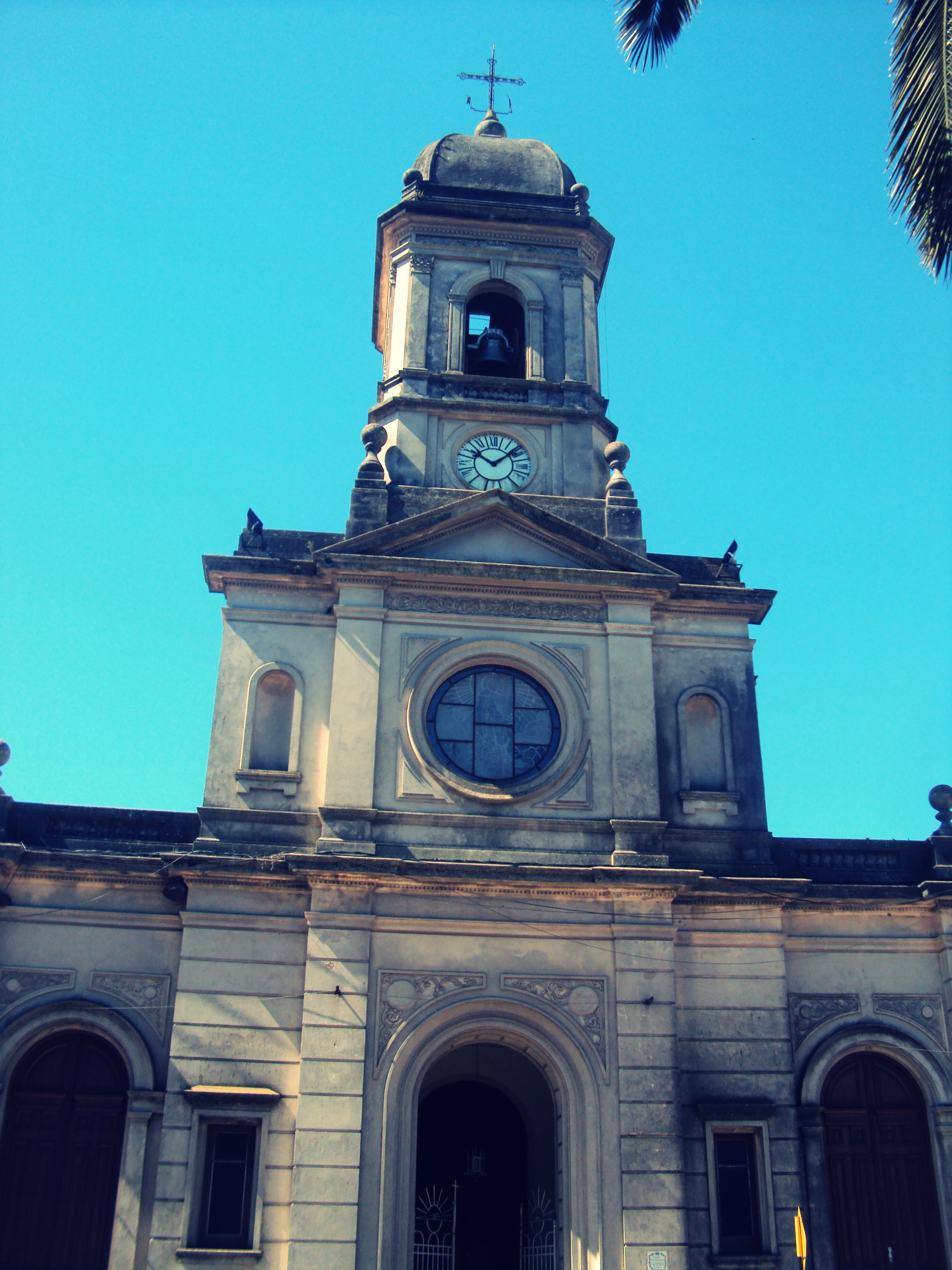
Church of the Immaculate Conception, Rivera.

The Church of the Immaculate Conception (Spanish: Iglesia de la Inmaculada Concepción), popularly known as La Inmaculada, is a Roman Catholic parish church in Rivera, Uruguay.

The original parish was established in 1884 by bishop Inocencio María Yéregui.

The cleric Carlos Parteli was its pastor in the 1940s, before being appointed Bishop of Tacuarembó in 1960.
