= Roberto Reinaldo Cáceres González =

Uruguayan Roman Catholic prelate (1921–2019)

- Bishop of Melo
- Church: Roman Catholic Church
- See: The Diocese of Melo
- In office: 1962 - 1996
- Predecessor: Orestes Santiago Nuti Sanguinetti
- Successor: Nicolás Cotugno Fanizzi, S.D.B

Orders
- Ordination: July 15, 1945

Personal details
- Born: April 16, 1921 Buenos Aires, Argentina
- Died: January 13, 2019 (aged 97) Montevideo, Uruguay

Roberto Reinaldo Cáceres González (April 16, 1921 – January 13, 2019) was a Uruguayan Prelate of Roman Catholic Church.

== Biography ==
Cáceres was born in Buenos Aires, Argentina and was ordained a priest on July 15, 1945. Cáceres was appointed bishop of The Diocese of Melo on January 2, 1962, and consecrated on March 19, 1962. Cáceres retired from the Melo Diocese on April 23, 1996.
