= Juan Francisco Aragone =

Uruguayan Catholic archbishop (1883–1953)

- Archbishop of Montevideo
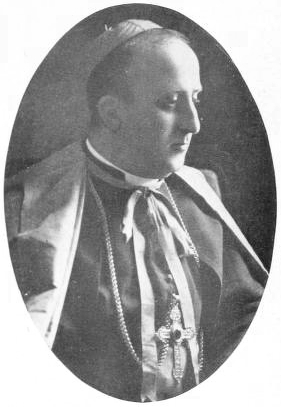
- Church: Latin Church
- See: Montevideo
- Appointed: 3 July 1919
- Retired: 20 November 1940
- Predecessor: Mariano Soler
- Successor: Antonio María Barbieri
- Other post: Titular Archbishop of Melitene (1940-1953)

Orders
- Ordination: 28 October 1908
- Consecration: 9 November 1919 by Alberto Vassallo-Torregrossa

Personal details
- Born: May 24, 1883 Carmelo, Uruguay
- Died: May 7, 1953 (aged 69) Montevideo
- Denomination: Roman Catholic
- Residence: Montevideo
- Motto: OMNIA POSSUM EO QUI ME CONFORTAT
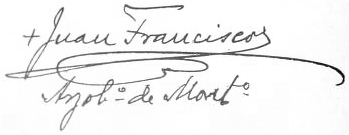
- Signature

- Coat of arms

Juan Francisco Aragone (born 24 May 1883 in Carmelo – deceased 7 May 1953 in Montevideo) was a Uruguayan cleric.

After over a decade vacancy, on 3 July 1919 Aragone was appointed as the second Roman Catholic archbishop of Montevideo. In his coat of arms can be read the motto Omnia possum in eo qui me confortat.

In 1940 he resigned and was appointed titular archbishop of Melitene. He died in 1953.
