= Miguel Paternain =

Roman Catholic bishop of Maldonado

- Bishop of Florida
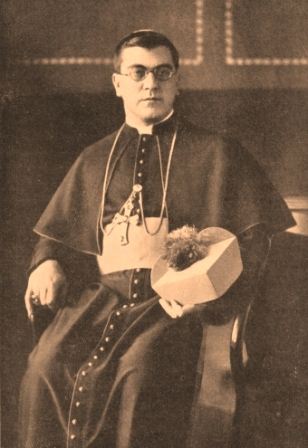
- See: Florida
- Installed: 1929
- Term ended: 1960
- Predecessor: José Joaquín Arrospide
- Successor: Humberto Tonna
- Previous post: Bishop of Melo

Personal details
- Born: November 16, 1894 Minas, Uruguay
- Died: October 21, 1970
- Denomination: Roman Catholic
- Motto: Oportet Christum Regnare (Christ must reign)

Miguel Paternain, C.Ss.R. (Minas, Uruguay, 16 November 1894 – 21 October 1970) was a Uruguayan Roman Catholic cleric.

== Biography ==
Ordained 19 February 1921 in the Congregation of the Most Holy Redeemer, he was appointed Bishop of Melo in 1929; he was ordained bishop by the Apostolic Nuncio to Argentina, Archbishop Filippo Cortesi. In 1931 his diocese is renamed Diocese of Florida-Melo, and since then, Paternain has his see at the Cathedral of Florida. Finally, in 1955 is created the Diocese of Florida, which Paternain still holds.

After a very long, fruitful bishopric, in 1960 he resigns as Bishop of Florida; he is appointed titular bishop of Mades in February and, in September, titular archbishop of Achrida.

He died in 1970.

== Bibliography ==
- Juan Vicente Chiarino Los Obispos de un siglo, conferencia dictada en el Club Católico de Montevideo el 7 de setiembre de 1978, publicada en Libro Annual 1978–1979 del Instituto Teológico del Uruguay, Montevideo, 1979
- Juan Villegas, Las Actividades Pastorales de los Obispos del Uruguay. 1878–1978, conferencia dictada en el Club Católico de Montevideo el 22 de junio de 1978, publicada en Libro Annual 1978–1979 del Instituto Teológico del Uruguay, Montevideo, 1979.
