= Turris in Mauretania =

Titular see

Mauretania Caesariensis (125 AD)

Turris in Mauretania is an ancient settlement of Roman North Africa in the Roman province of Mauretania Caesariensis. The location is unknown but believed to be in Algeria. The city was believed to be the site of an ancient bishopric but no bishops of antiquity are known to us. The suffix "in Mauretania" is to differentiate the town from cities that existed in Spain and adjoining provinces of Roman North Africa.

The diocese remains today a titular see of the Roman Catholic Church in the ecclesiastical province of Carthage. The current titular bishop is Bishop Alain de Raemy, auxiliary bishop of Lausanne, Genève et Fribourg (Switzerland).
