= Roman Catholic Diocese of Florida =

Roman Catholic diocese in Uruguay

Coordinates: 34.1005°S 56.2142°W

Diocese of Florida Dioecesis Floridensis Diócesis de Florida

Catholic
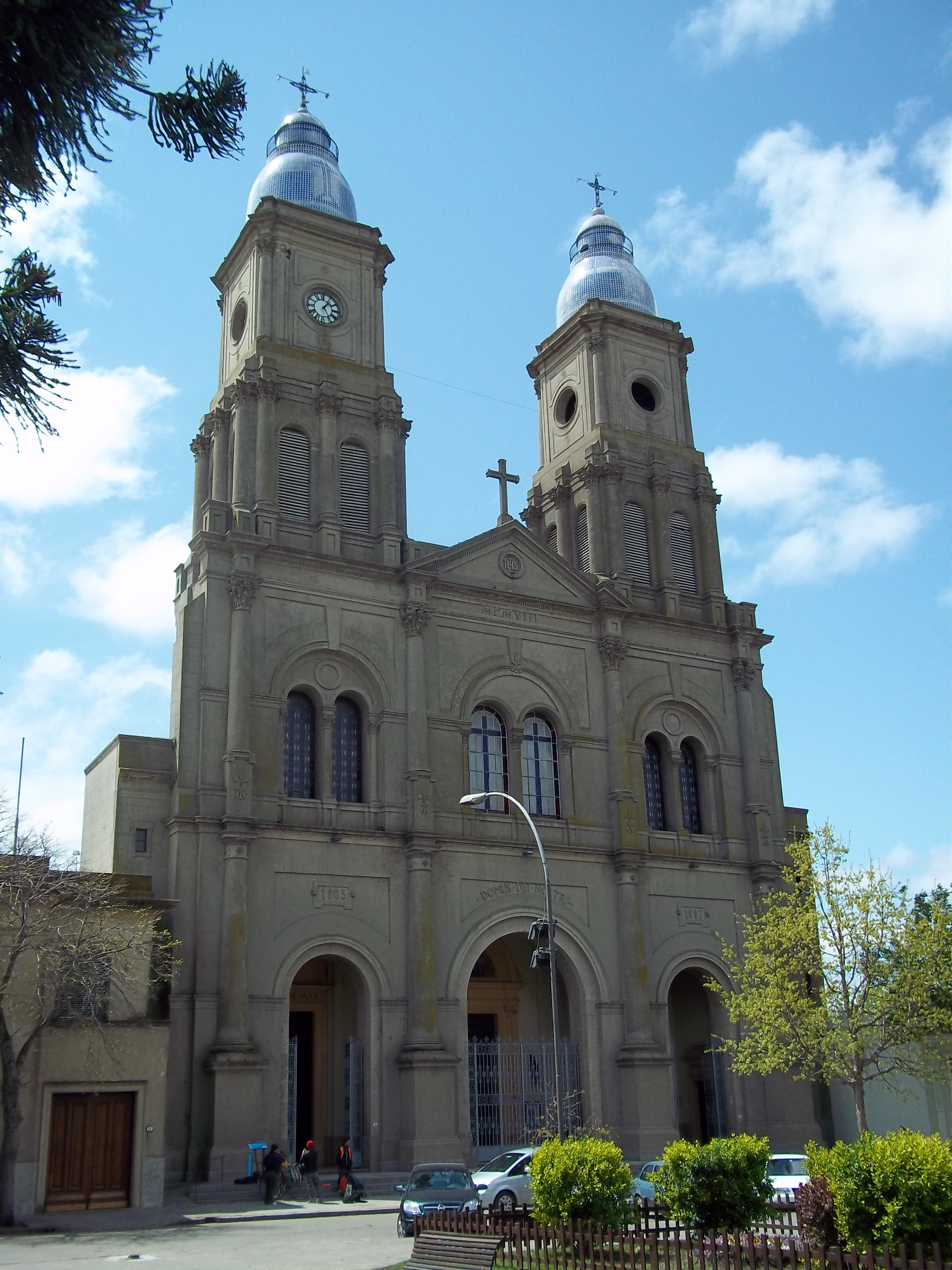
- Cathedral Basilica; Sanctuary of Our Lady of the Thirty-Three

Location
- Country: Uruguay
- Ecclesiastical province: Montevideo

Statistics
- Area: 22,600 km^{2} (8,700 sq mi)
- Population: Total; Catholics: (as of 2006); 123,800; 91,000 (73.5%)
- Parishes: 16

Information
- Denomination: Catholic Church
- Sui iuris church: Latin Church
- Rite: Roman Rite
- Established: 14 April 1897 (129 years ago)
- Cathedral: Catedral Basílica Santuario de la Virgen de los Treinta y Tres

Current leadership
- Pope: Leo XIV
- Bishop: Alfonso Bauer
- Bishops emeritus: Martín Pérez Scremini

Map
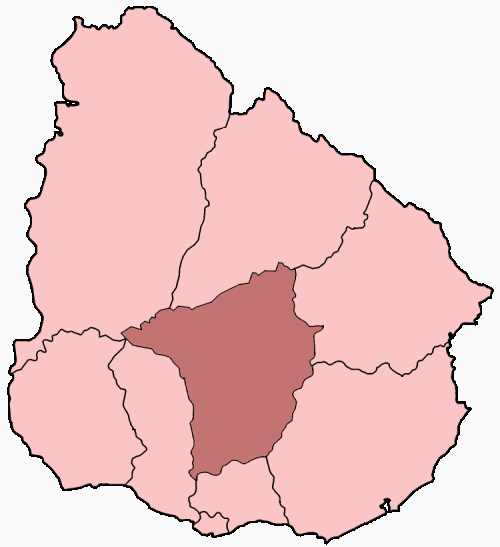

The Diocese of Florida (Latin: Dioecesis Floridensis) is a Latin Church ecclesiastical territory or diocese of the Catholic Church in southern Uruguay. It is a suffragan diocese in the ecclesiastical province (covering all Uruguay) of the metropolitan Archdiocese of Montevideo.

Its cathedra is a minor basilica, the Catedral Basílica de Nuestra Señora del Luján, dedicated to Our Lady of Luján.

The current bishop, Alfonso Bauer, was appointed in March 2026.

== History ==
- Established on 1931.08.11 as Diocese of Florida–Melo / Floriden(sis)–Melen(sis) (Latin), on territory split off from the suppressed Diocese of Melo (which was erected in 1897 on territory split off from the then Diocese of Montevideo)
- Renamed on 1955.11.15 as Diocese of Florida / Floriden(sis) (Latin), having lost territory to (re)establish a Diocese of Melo.
- Lost territory on 1960.10.22 to establish the Diocese of Tacuarembó.
- Enjoyed a Papal visit by Pope John Paul II in May 1988.

== Statistics ==
As per 2014, it pastorally served 91,500 Catholics (74.7% of 122,500 total) on 22,600 km^{2} in 17 parishes and 72 missions with 29 priests (9 diocesan, 20 religious), 5 deacons, 70 lay religious (22 brothers, 48 sisters), and 1 seminarian.

== Episcopal ordinaries ==
(all Roman Rite)

Suffragan Bishop of Florida–Melo

- Miguel Paternain, Redemptorists (C.Ss.R.) (20 April 1929 – 15 November 1955 see below), previously Bishop of mother see Melo (Uruguay) (1929.04.20 – 1931.08.11)

Suffragan Bishops of Florida

- Miguel Paternain, Redemptorists (C.Ss.R.) (see above 15 November 1955 – retired 27 February 1960), emeritate first as Titular Bishop of Mades (1960.02.27 – 1960.09.21), then 'promoted' Titular Archbishop of Acrida (1960.09.21 – death 1970.10.19)
- Humberto Tonna Zanotta (5 July 1960 – retired 16 June 1987), also President of Episcopal Conference of Uruguay (1975 – 1979); died 1994
- Raúl Horacio Scarrone Carrero (15 June 1987 – retired 15 March 2008), also President of Episcopal Conference of Uruguay (1991 – 1994 & 1997 – 2000); previously Titular Bishop of Ulpiana (1982.10.13 – 1987.06.15) as Auxiliary Bishop of Archdiocese of Montevideo (Uruguay) (1982.10.13 – 1987.06.15)
- Martín Pablo Pérez Scremini (15 March 2008 – retired 19 March 2026), previously Titular Bishop of Vazari (2004.03.06 – 2008.03.15) as Auxiliary Bishop of Archdiocese of Montevideo (Uruguay) (2004.03.06 – 2008.03.15)
- Alfonso Bauer (19 March 2026 – Present)

== See also ==
- List of Catholic dioceses in Uruguay
- List of churches in the Diocese of Florida
