= Jebiniana =

Coordinates: 35°01′51″N 10°54′14″E

Jebiniana جبنيانة Djebeliana
- Commune and town
- Nickname: Gubaliana
- Interactive map of Jebiniana
- Country: Tunisia
- Governorate: Sfax Governorate

Government
  - Mayor: Jouda Zghidi (Popular Front)

Population (2014)
  - Total: 7,190
- Time zone: UTC+1 (CET)

Jebiniana is a town and commune in the Sfax Governorate, Tunisia.

Also known as Djebeliana, this town is 35km north of Sfax on the Mediterranean coastal plain near El Amra.

As of 2014 it had a population of 7,190.

For a long time, its functions have been limited to those of an agricultural village marketing the products of its surrounding countryside during a weekly market. But it is also a service center that functions as a relay in relation to the agglomeration of Sfax. The city nevertheless struggles to develop even if only on the agricultural level because its soil is cramped within the large olive grove of the region of Sfax.

During the Roman Empire Djebeliana was the site of a civitas of the Roman province of Africa Proconsularis, and in late Antiquity found itself in Byzacena. At this time, the town was also the seat of an ancient Christian diocese, which survives today as a titular bishopric of the Roman Catholic Church, the current bishop of which is Otto Georgens of Germany. The ruins of the Roman town were examined by the French.

In 2025, the Tunisian National Office of Handicrafts (Office national de l'artisanat tunisien), with the support of the World Intellectual Property Organization, launched an initiative to promote the mouchtia of Jebiniana, a traditional garment for women, made from handwoven wool. In 2026, the collective trademark "Mouchtia de Jebeniana" was officially registered with the National Institute for Standardization and Industrial Property (INNORPI), with the aim of protecting and promoting this local artisanal know-how.

Traditional weaving in Jeneniana

== See also ==
- List of cities in Tunisia
