= Montevideo Metropolitan Cathedral =

18th-century Roman Catholic cathedral in Montevideo, Uruguay

Coordinates: 34°54′25.2″S 56°12′14.8″W

Metropolitan Cathedral
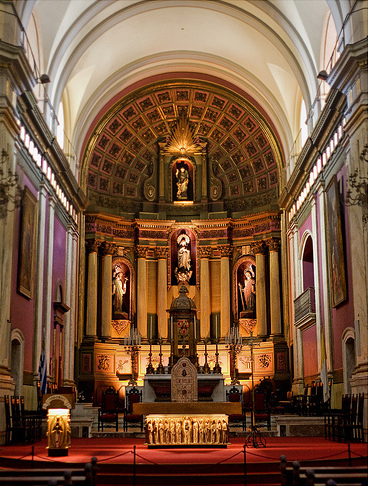
- Altar

Religion
- Affiliation: Roman Catholic
- Rite: Latin rite
- Leadership: Archdiocese of Montevideo
- Year consecrated: 1804
- Status: Active

Location
- Location: Ituzaingó 1373; Ciudad Vieja, Montevideo, Uruguay
- Municipality: Montevideo
- Interactive map of Metropolitan Cathedral

Architecture
- Groundbreaking: 1724
- Length: )

Website
- http://www.arquidiocesis.net

The Montevideo Metropolitan Cathedral (Spanish: Catedral Metropolitana de Montevideo) is the main Roman Catholic church of Montevideo, and seat of its archdiocese. It is located right in front of the Cabildo across Constitution Square, in the neighbourhood of Ciudad Vieja.

== History ==
The origin of the church dates from Spanish colonial times (1740), when a church constructed of brick was built on the site. In 1790, the foundation was laid for the construction of the current neoclassical structure. The church was consecrated in 1804; it is dedicated to the Immaculate Conception and to the patron saints of Montevideo, Philip and James.

There is one major altar, several side altars, memorials, and tombs of several of the former archbishops and bishops who served in the cathedral. On a side altar is venerated an image of the Virgin of the Thirty-Three, patron saint of Uruguay.

== In Culture ==
According to the Spanish guitarist Anabel Montesinos, the cathedral was the inspiration behind the piece La Catedral by Agustín Barrios.

== Gallery ==
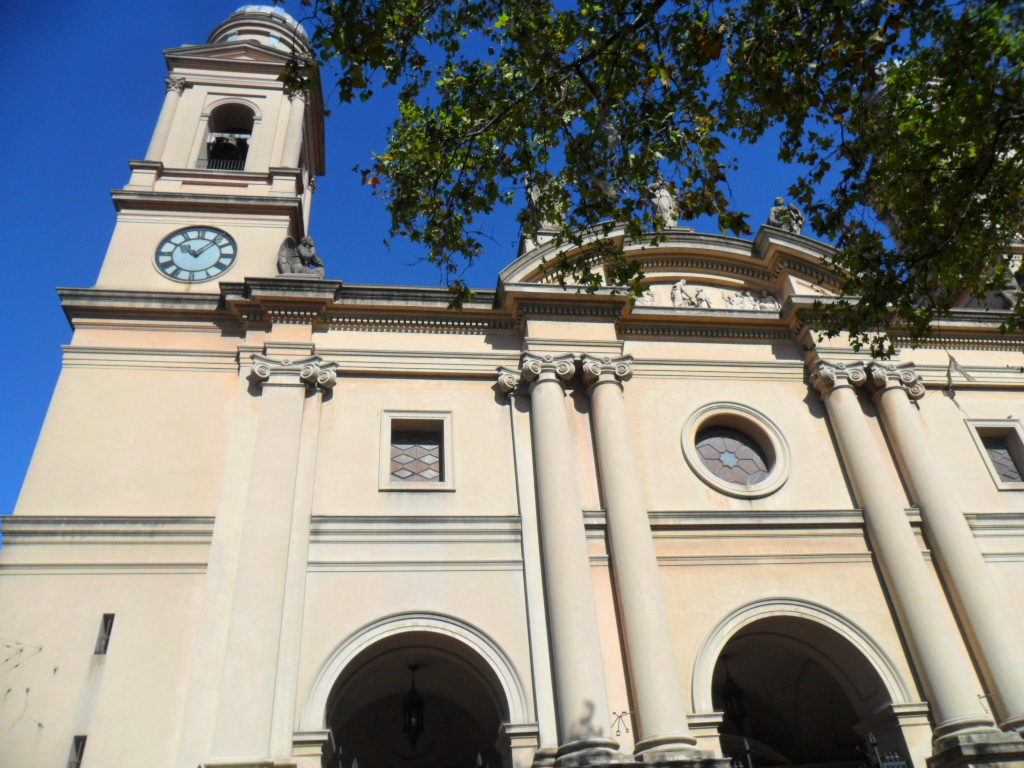
Façade of the Montevideo Metropolitan Cathedral, showing the left tower

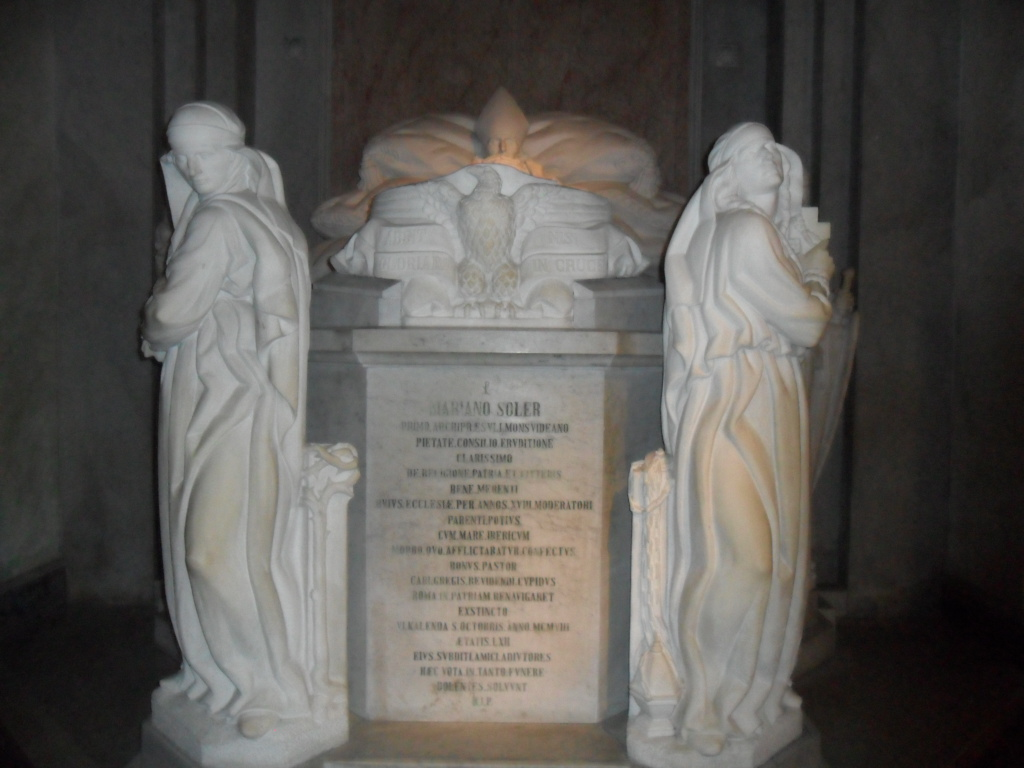
Tomb of Archbishop Mariano Soler at the Metropolitan Cathedral of Montevideo

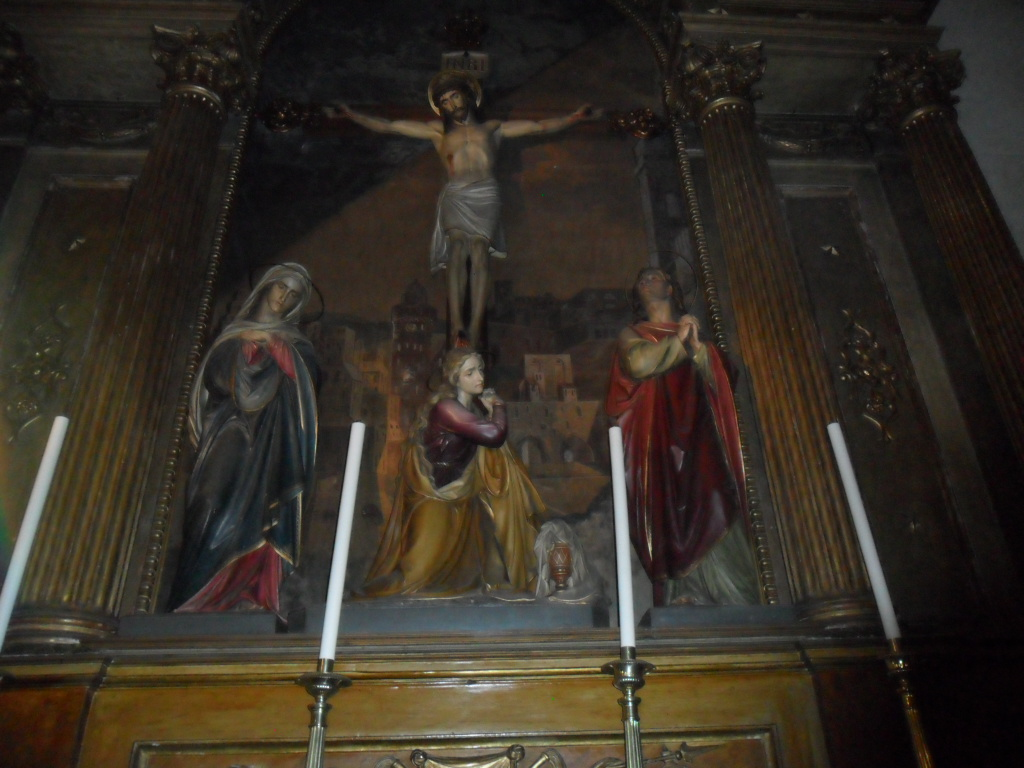
Altar of Metropolitan Cathedral of Montevideo showing the crucifixion of Jesus Christ

== See also ==
- List of Roman Catholic cathedrals in Uruguay
- Roman Catholic Archdiocese of Montevideo
