= Cathedral of Florida =

Roman Catholic church building in Florida, Uruguay

Catedral Basílica de Florida
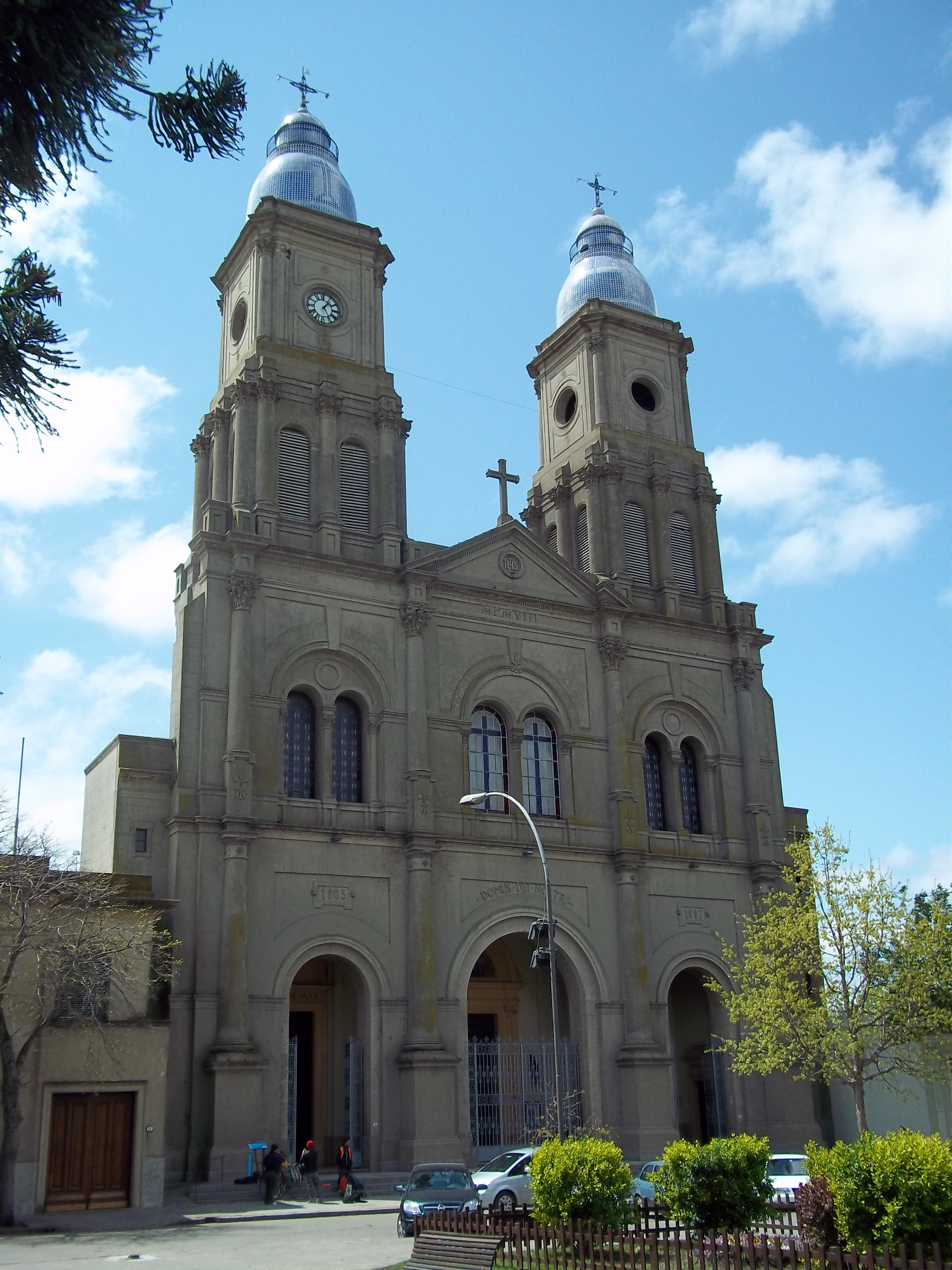

Religion
- Affiliation: Roman Catholic
- Diocese: Diocese of Florida
- Year consecrated: 1887

Location
- Location: Florida, Uruguay
- Interactive map of Catedral Basílica de Florida
- Coordinates: 34.1005°S 56.2141°W

Architecture
- Style: Neo-Renaissance

The Cathedral Basilica of Florida (Spanish: Catedral Basílica de Florida) is the main Roman Catholic church building of Florida, Uruguay. It is the see of the Roman Catholic Diocese of Florida since 1956.

== History ==
At this place there was originally another, smaller church, the Chapel of Our Lady of Luján of El Pintado (Spanish: Capilla de Nuestra Señora del Luján del Pintado), which in 1805 was elevated to parish church. (Note that Our Lady of Luján was declared patron saint of Uruguay by Pope Pius IX in 1930).

In 1887 was built the current temple; over its door reads the Latin expression Domus Dei nostri (English: House of Our God).

Nowadays it is the National Sanctuary of the Virgin of the Thirty-Three (Spanish: Santuario Nacional de la Virgen de los Treinta y Tres); the image of Our Lady of the Thirty-Three, patron saint of Uruguay, is venerated here.

In 1988, during his second pastoral visit to Uruguay, Pope John Paul II visited this cathedral.

== See also ==
- List of Roman Catholic cathedrals in Uruguay
- Roman Catholic Diocese of Florida
