= Florida, Uruguay =

Capital city of Florida Department, Uruguay

Florida
- Capital city
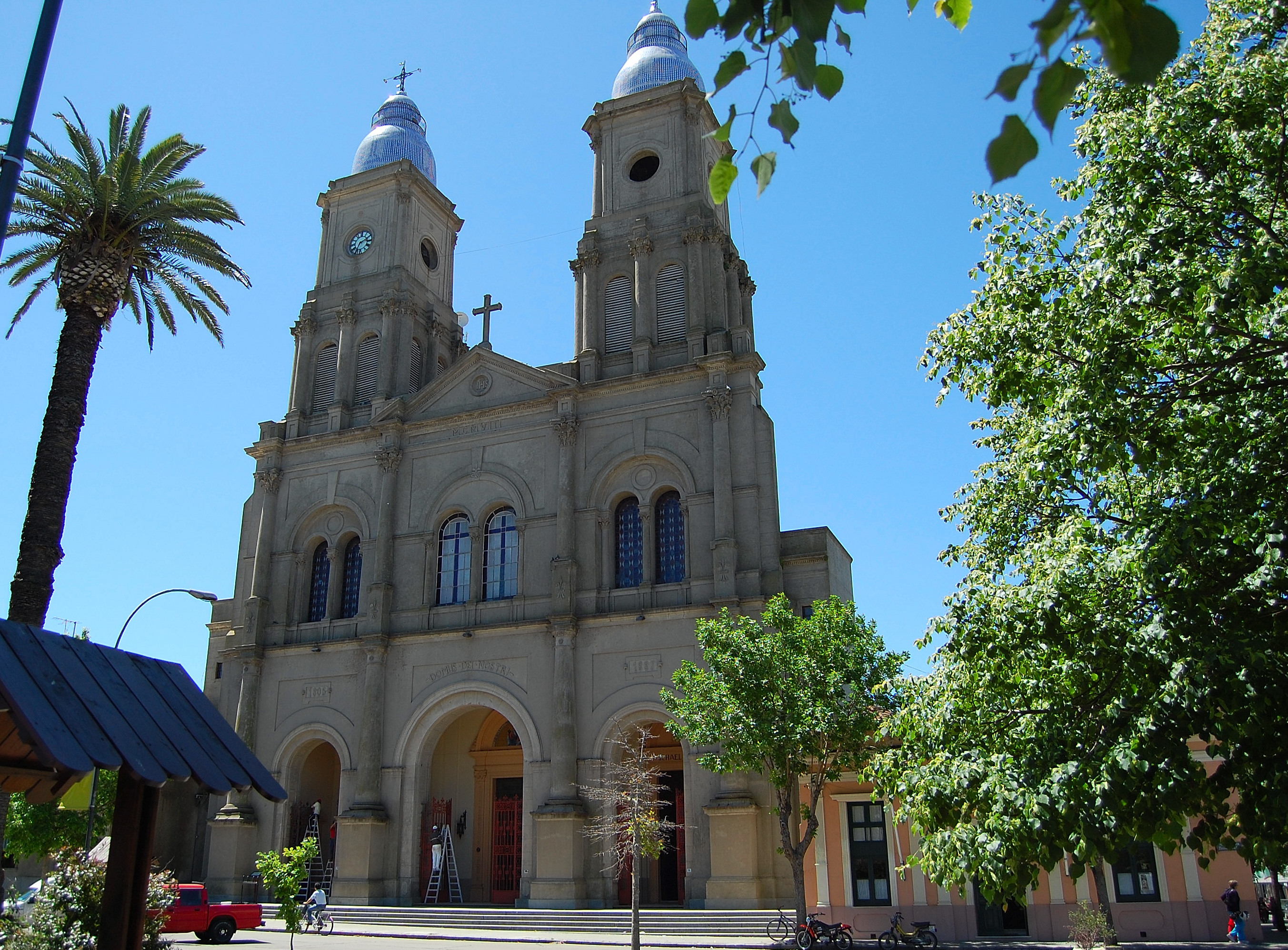
- Plaza Asamblea & Cathedral of Florida

- Location in Uruguay
- Coordinates: 34°06′S 56°13′W
- Country: Uruguay
- Department: (Florida Department) Florida
- Founded: 1809

Area
  - Total: 33.4 km^{2} (12.9 sq mi)
- Elevation: 70 m (230 ft)

Population (2023 Census)
  - Total: 36,471
  - Density: 1,090/km^{2} (2,830/sq mi)
- Postal code: 94000
- Dial plan: +598 435 (+5 digits)
- Climate: Cfa

Florida (Spanish pronunciation: [floˈɾiða]) is the capital of Florida Department of Uruguay. Having a population of over 36,000, it is home to almost half of the inhabitants of the department.

== Geography ==
It is located on Route 5, around 90 kilometres (56 mi) north of Montevideo.

The stream Arroyo Santa Lucía Chico flows along the east and south limits of the city.

=== Climate ===
On 14 January 2022, Florida recorded a temperature of 44.0 °C (111.2 °F), which is the joint highest temperature (along with Paysandú) to have ever been recorded in Uruguay.

Climate data for Florida, Uruguay (1991–2020)
Month	Jan	Feb	Mar	Apr	May	Jun	Jul	Aug	Sep	Oct	Nov	Dec	Year
Record high °C (°F)	44.0 (111.2)	39.2 (102.6)	36.2 (97.2)	36.0 (96.8)	32.3 (90.1)	28.6 (83.5)	32.0 (89.6)	33.5 (92.3)	33.4 (92.1)	33.2 (91.8)	38.4 (101.1)	41.0 (105.8)	44.0 (111.2)
Mean daily maximum °C (°F)	30.2 (86.4)	28.9 (84.0)	27.1 (80.8)	23.3 (73.9)	19.4 (66.9)	16.0 (60.8)	15.2 (59.4)	17.5 (63.5)	19.1 (66.4)	22.1 (71.8)	25.4 (77.7)	28.5 (83.3)	22.7 (72.9)
Daily mean °C (°F)	23.4 (74.1)	22.6 (72.7)	20.9 (69.6)	17.2 (63.0)	13.8 (56.8)	10.8 (51.4)	10.0 (50.0)	11.8 (53.2)	13.4 (56.1)	16.2 (61.2)	18.8 (65.8)	21.6 (70.9)	16.6 (61.9)
Mean daily minimum °C (°F)	16.5 (61.7)	16.3 (61.3)	14.5 (58.1)	11.3 (52.3)	8.1 (46.6)	5.6 (42.1)	4.9 (40.8)	6.1 (43.0)	7.5 (45.5)	10.3 (50.5)	12.3 (54.1)	14.6 (58.3)	10.6 (51.1)
Record low °C (°F)	6.0 (42.8)	6.0 (42.8)	3.2 (37.8)	−1.0 (30.2)	−3.4 (25.9)	−8.5 (16.7)	−7.4 (18.7)	−4.5 (23.9)	−3.0 (26.6)	−1.5 (29.3)	0.4 (32.7)	3.0 (37.4)	−8.5 (16.7)
Average precipitation mm (inches)	104.7 (4.12)	110.1 (4.33)	115.9 (4.56)	114.0 (4.49)	98.0 (3.86)	97.7 (3.85)	93.6 (3.69)	89.1 (3.51)	110.1 (4.33)	118.9 (4.68)	99.2 (3.91)	106.5 (4.19)	1,257.8 (49.52)
Average precipitation days (≥ 1.0 mm)	6	7	7	8	7	7	7	7	7	8	7	7	85
Mean monthly sunshine hours	285.6	241.1	227.0	177.0	154.0	130.9	141.8	165.6	180.3	210.7	257.1	279.0	2,450.1
Source 1: Instituto Uruguayo de Metereología
Source 2: NOAA (precipitation and sun 1991–2020)

== History ==
The city was founded on 24 April 1809 with this name, Florida, in honor of the count of Floridablanca, the prime minister of the Spanish crown. It had acquired the status of "Villa" (town) before the Independence of Uruguay. On 10 July 1856, it became capital city of the department by the Act of Ley Nº 493 and on 19 April 1894 its status was elevated to "Ciudad" (city) by the Act of Ley Nº 2.258.

It is home of the famous Piedra Alta de la Florida, the place of the Declaration of Independence in 1825. The city is also famous for San Cono's chapel, where multitudes gather every 3 June.

An important building is the Cathedral of Florida, which is the National Sanctuary of the Virgin of the Thirty-Three.

== Population ==
In 2023, Florida had a population of 36,471.

Year	Population
1908	10,606
1963	20,934
1975	25,374
1985	28,443
1996	31,594
2004	32,128
2011	33,639
2023	36,471

Source: National Statistics Institute

== Sister city ==
Florida has one sister city:

- Asunción, Paraguay

== Places of worship ==
- Cathedral Sanctuary of Our Lady of the Thirty-Three (Roman Catholic)
- St. Joseph Parish Church (Roman Catholic)
- St. Thérèse of Lisieux Parish Church (Roman Catholic)
- St. Conus Chapel in Florida, a very popular Roman Catholic pilgrimage sanctuary

== Notable people ==
- Atilio Ancheta (1948-), Uruguayan international footballer
- Medardo R. Farías (1898-1960), Uruguayan army general and aviator
