= Daniel Sturla =

Uruguayan Catholic prelate (born 1959)

His Eminence Daniel Fernando Sturla Berhouet S.D.B.
- Cardinal; Archbishop of Montevideo
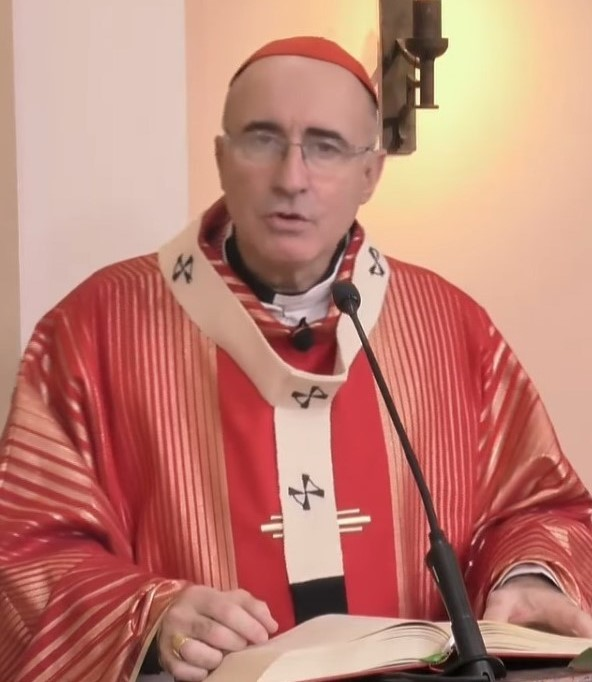
- Cardinal Sturla in 2021
- Church: Catholic Church
- Archdiocese: Montevideo
- See: Montevideo
- Appointed: 11 February 2014
- Installed: 9 March 2014
- Predecessor: Nicolás Cotugno
- Other post: Cardinal-Priest of Santa Galla (2015-)
- Previous posts: Auxiliary Bishop of Montevideo (2011–14); Titular Bishop of Phelbes (2011-14)

Orders
- Ordination: 21 November 1987
- Consecration: 4 March 2012 by Nicolás Cotugno; Arturo Fajardo; Milton Tróccoli
- Created cardinal: 14 February 2015 by Pope Francis
- Rank: Cardinal-Priest

Personal details
- Born: Daniel Fernando Sturla Berhouet; July 4, 1959 (age 67) Montevideo, Uruguay
- Residence: Montevideo
- Motto: Servir al Señor con Alegría (Serve the Lord with gladness)
- Coat of arms: Daniel Fernando Sturla Berhouet's coat of arms

Ordination history of Daniel Sturla
History
Priestly ordination
- Date: 21 November 1987
Episcopal consecration
- Principal consecrator: Nicolas Cotugno
- Co-consecrators: Arturo Eduardo Fajardo Bustamante; Milton Luis Troccoli Cebedio
- Date: 4 March 2012
Cardinalate
- Elevated by: Pope Francis
- Date: 14 February 2015

Styles of Daniel Fernando Sturla Berhouet, SDB
- Reference style: His Eminence
- Spoken style: Your Eminence
- Religious style: Cardinal
- Informal style: Cardinal

Daniel Fernando Sturla Berhouet, SDB (born 4 July 1959 in Montevideo) is a Uruguayan Catholic prelate and the archbishop of Montevideo.

== Biography ==
Sturla was born at the Italian Hospital of Montevideo on July 4, 1959, the youngest of five siblings. Raised in a middle-class family, he is of Italian and Basque-French descent. His father, a practicing Catholic and a lawyer by profession, had been a member of Catholic Action in his youth, whereas his mother, an agnostic, was brought up in a household with Batllist ideals. Both parents died during Sturla’s adolescence, leaving him in the care of his elder siblings and other relatives.

He completed his primary and secondary education at Colegio San Juan Bautista, and his pre-university studies at the John XXIII Institute, run by the Salesians of Don Bosco. After graduating, he enrolled in the Faculty of Law at the University of the Republic. He entered the Salesian novitiate in 1979 and made his first religious profession on January 31, 1980.

He studied theology at what was then called the Bishop Mariano Soler Theological Institute of Uruguay, and on November 21, 1987, he was ordained a priest.

After his ordination he served as vicar of the Salesian novitiate and post-novitiate, director of the Salesian aspirantate, master of novices, director of the John XXIII Institute, and professor of Church history. He earned a licentiate in theology from the Soler Theological Institute in 2006.

On October 28, 2008, he was named Salesian provincial for Uruguay, and shortly after was elected president of the Conference of Religious of Uruguay.

On December 10, 2011, Pope Benedict XVI named him titular bishop of Felbes and auxiliary bishop of Montevideo. On February 11, 2014, Pope Francis promoted him to archbishop of Montevideo, Uruguay. On 9 March 2014 on the occasion of his inauguration a Mass was held together with Archbishop emeritus Nicolás Cotugno and Apostolic Nuncio Anselmo Guido Pecorari; the Mass was attended by President José Mujica, Vice President Danilo Astori, former President Luis Alberto Lacalle, senator Pedro Bordaberry and the mayor of Montevideo Ana Olivera, among others.

Within the Episcopal Conference of Uruguay he has been put in charge of the Departments of the Missions and of the Laity.

In a 2026 press conference organised by Aid to the Church in Need, ahead of Pope Leo XIV's visit to the country, Cardinal Sturla described the Church in Urugay as "poor and free, small and beautiful”.

== Cardinal ==
Sturla was created a cardinal by Pope Francis on 14 February 2015. As Cardinal-Priest he was assigned the titular church of Santa Galla.

In April 2015 Sturla Berhouet was appointed a member of the Congregation for Institutes of Consecrated Life and Societies of Apostolic Life, Pontifical Council for Promoting the New Evangelization, and Pontifical Commission for Latin America.

On 18 March 2020, Pope Francis named him a member of the Commission of Cardinals of the Administration of the Patrimony of the Apostolic See.

He participated as a cardinal elector in the 2025 papal conclave that elected Pope Leo XIV.

== Selected works ==
- 1916–1917: Separación de la Iglesia y el Estado en el Uruguay, Instituto Teológico del Uruguay Mariano Soler, Libro Annual, 1993 (in Spanish)
- ¿Santa o de Turismo? Calendario y secularización en el Uruguay, Instituto Superior Salesiano, colección Proyecto Educativo, 2010 (in Spanish)

== See also ==
- Cardinals created by Pope Francis

Catholic Church titles
Preceded by Nicolás Domingo Cotugno Fanizzi	Archbishop of Montevideo; 2014 – present	Incumbent
Preceded by titular church established	Cardinal Priest of Santa Galla; 2015–present	Incumbent
