= José Gottardi Cristelli =

Uruguayan cleric

José Gottardi Cristelli S.D.B.
- Archbishop of Montevideo
- Church: Catholic Church
- Archdiocese: Archdiocese of Montevideo
- In office: 5 June 1985 – 4 December 1998
- Predecessor: Carlos Parteli
- Successor: Nicolás Cotugno
- Previous posts: Auxiliary Bishop of Montevideo (1975-1985); Titular Bishop of Bellicastrum (1972-1985); Auxiliary Bishop of Mercedes (1972-1975)

Orders
- Ordination: 15 October 1950
- Consecration: 30 April 1972 by Augustin-Joseph Sépinski

Personal details
- Born: 21 September 1923 Baselga di Pinè, Venezia Tridentina, Kingdom of Italy, Italian Empire
- Died: 7 March 2005 (aged 81) Montevideo, Uruguay
- Denomination: Roman Catholic
- Residence: Montevideo

José Gottardi Cristelli, S.D.B. (21 September 1923, in Baselga di Pinè, Trentino – 7 March 2005, in Montevideo) was a Uruguayan Roman Catholic prelate.

He was ordained on 15 October 1950 as a Salesian of Don Bosco. On 1 March 1972 he was appointed titular bishop of Bellicastrum and auxiliary bishop of Mercedes; three years later, auxiliary bishop of Montevideo. On 5 June 1985 he was appointed Archbishop of Montevideo; he retired in 1998.
