= Diocese of Melo =

Roman Catholic diocese in Uruguay

Diocese of Melo Dioecesis Melensis Diócesis de Melo

Catholic

Location
- Country: Uruguay
- Ecclesiastical province: Montevideo

Statistics
- Area: 25,000 km^{2} (9,700 sq mi)
- Population: Total; Catholics: (as of 2004); 150,000; 110,000 (73.3%)
- Parishes: 16

Information
- Denomination: Catholic Church
- Sui iuris church: Latin Church
- Rite: Roman Rite
- Established: 15 November 1955 (70 years ago)
- Cathedral: Catedral Nuestra Señora del Pilar y San Rafael

Current leadership
- Pope: Leo XIV
- Bishop: Pablo Alfonso Jourdán Alvariza

Map
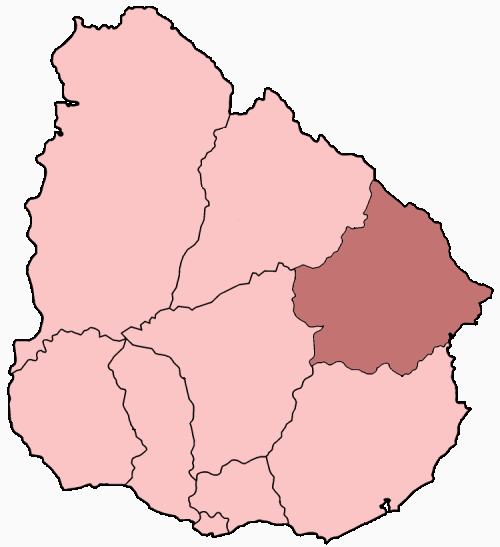

Website
- Blog "Dar y Comunicar"

The Diocese of Melo (Latin: Dioecesis Melensis) is a Latin Church ecclesiastical territory or diocese Catholic church in Uruguay.

== History ==
The diocese was erected in 1955, split off from the former diocese of Florida-Melo, and is a suffragan of the Archdiocese of Montevideo. Its see is at the Cathedral of Melo.

The current bishop is Pablo Alfonso Jourdán Alvariza, who was appointed in 2021.

== Ordinaries ==
- José Maria Cavallero † (20 Dec 1955–9 July 1960 Appointed, Bishop of Minas)
- Orestes Santiago Nuti Sanguinetti, S.D.B. † (9 Jul 1960–2 January 1962 Appointed, Bishop of Canelones)
- Roberto Reinaldo Cáceres González † (2 Jan 1962 – 23 Apr 1996 Retired)
- Nicolás Cotugno Fanizzi, S.D.B. (June 13, 1996–December 4, 1998, Appointed, Archbishop of Montevideo)
- Luis del Castillo Estrada, S.J. (21 Dec 1999–13 – 13 Jun 2009)
- Heriberto Andrés Bodeant Fernández (13 Jun 2009–19 March 2021 Appointed, Bishop of Canelones)
- Pablo Alfonso Jourdán Alvariza (15 Sep 2021 – present)

== See also ==
- List of churches in the Diocese of Melo
- List of Roman Catholic dioceses in Uruguay
