= Nicolás Cotugno =

Italian-Uruguayan Roman Catholic priest (born 1938)

His Excellency Nicolás Domingo Cotugno Fanizzi S.D.B.
- Archbishop Emeritus of Montevideo
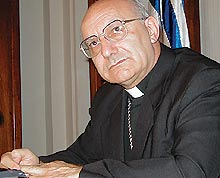
- Church: Roman Catholic
- Archdiocese: Montevideo
- See: Montevideo
- Appointed: 4 December 1998
- Term ended: 11 February 2014
- Predecessor: José Gottardi
- Successor: Daniel Sturla
- Previous post: Bishop of Melo

Orders
- Ordination: 26 July 1967
- Consecration: 28 Jul 1996 by Francesco De Nittis

Personal details
- Born: September 21, 1938 (age 87) Sesto San Giovanni, Kingdom of Italy
- Denomination: Roman Catholic
- Residence: Montevideo, Uruguay

Nicolás Domingo Cotugno Fanizzi S.D.B. (Latin American Spanish: [nikoˈlas ðoˈmiŋɡo koˈtuɲo faˈnisi], Italian: [nikoˈlaz doˈmiŋɡo koˈtuɲɲo faˈnittsi]; born 21 September 1938) is an Italian-Uruguayan Roman Catholic priest.

== Early life ==
He was the Archbishop of Montevideo from 4 December 1998 till 11 February 2014. Previously he served as Bishop of Melo.

In September 2013 he tendered his resignation to Pope Francis, due to age reasons. He was succeeded by the former Auxiliary Bishop of Montevideo, Daniel Sturla.
