= Lajos Hencsey =

Hungarian locksmith

Lajos Hencsey (Szentpéterúr 1814 - Zürich 1844) was a Hungarian locksmith or blacksmith who became leader of Samuel Heinrich Fröhlich's Nazarener Church in Transylvania which continues in Romania with around 1,000 members.

This group is usually distinguished from the "Nazarenes" of Swiss silkweaver and prophet Johann Jakob Wirz and started a group called the Nazarenes, or in German Nazarener in Basel in 1830s. However one theory holds that the nineteen-year Hencsey came to Switzerland where he met the disciples of Wirz and adopted their name instead of other numerous names circulating for Frohlich's followers.
