= Wirz =

Wirz is a Swiss surname. Notable people with the surname include:

- George Otto Wirz (1929–2010), American Roman Catholic bishop
- Henry Wirz (1823–1865), American officer of the Confederate States Army
- Johann Jakob Wirz (1778–1858), Swiss Theosophist prophet
- Rodolfo Wirz (1942–2025), Uruguayan Roman Catholic bishop
- Rudolf Wirz (1918–1988), Swiss field handball player
- Susi Wirz (born 1931), Swiss figure skater
- Valentin Wirz (born 1981), Swiss ice hockey player
