= Cathedral of Maldonado =

Roman Catholic church building in Maldonado, Uruguay

Catedral de San Fernando de Maldonado
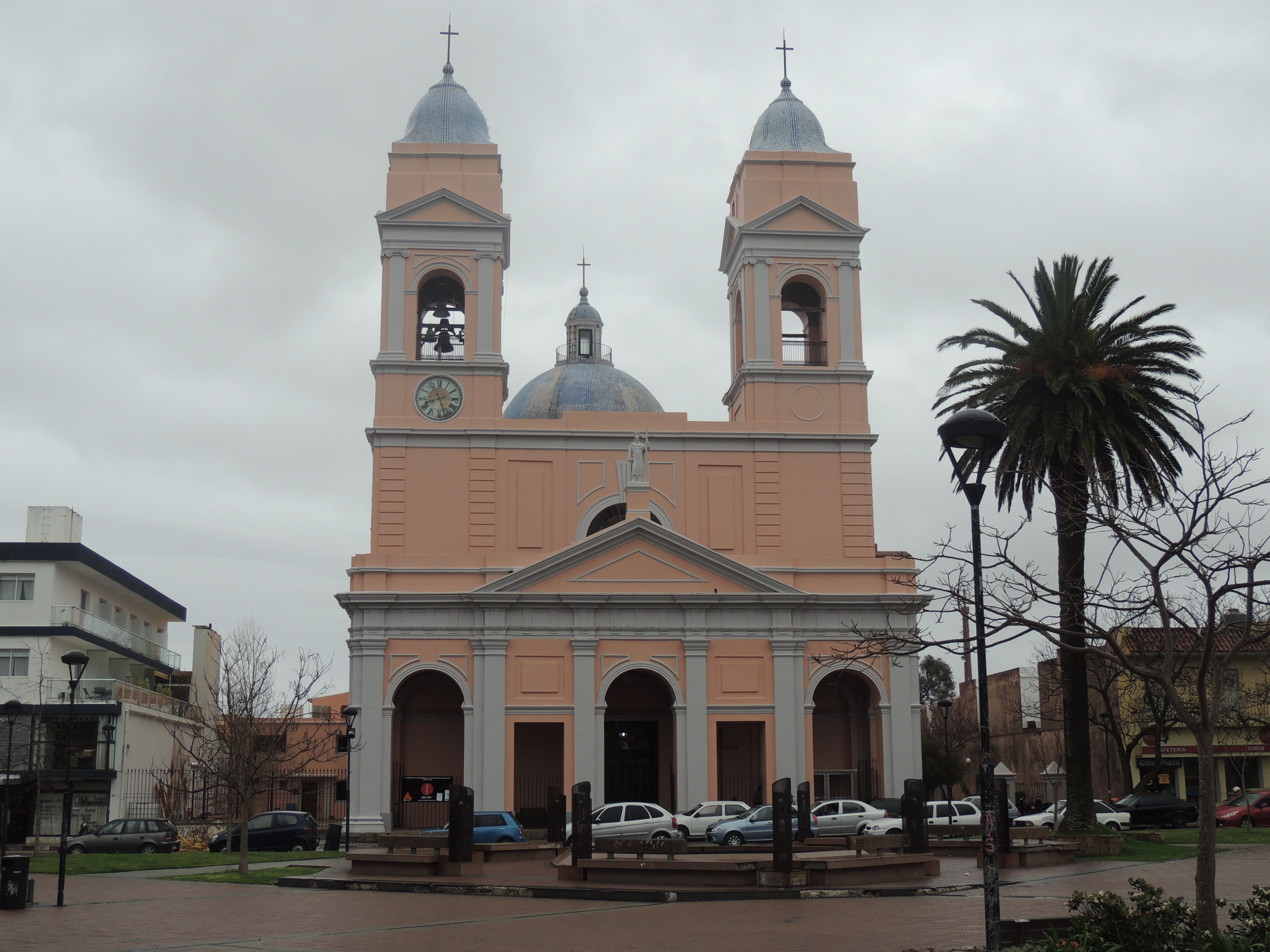

Religion
- Affiliation: Roman Catholic
- Diocese: Diocese of Maldonado-Punta del Este

Location
- Location: Maldonado, Uruguay
- Interactive map of Catedral de San Fernando de Maldonado
- Coordinates: 34.9088°S 54.9589°W

Architecture
- Style: Neoclassicism
- Completed: 1895

The Cathedral of Saint Ferdinand of Maldonado (Spanish: Catedral de San Fernando de Maldonado) is the main Roman Catholic church building of Maldonado, Uruguay. Since 1966, it took the name of Cathedral for being the seat of the Roman Catholic Diocese of Maldonado-Punta del Este, founded by S.S. Paul VI on January 10, 1966. Its first pastor was Antonio Corso (1966–1985), and its current pastor is Rodolfo Wirz (1985–Present).

== History ==
A first church was built in Spanish colonial times. The construction of the present Neoclassical building was started in 1801, but the English Invasions 1806, interrupted the works, a delay that caused completion of the cathedral to take almost a century. It was finally inaugurated in 1895 by the Archbishop of Montevideo, Mariano Soler. It is dedicated to saint Ferdinand.

It consists of a main nave with two bell towers and a central dome. At the end of the main nave, a cross is formed from two niches containing sculptures on the sides of the High Altar. The magnificent High Altar is the work of Antonio Veiga, who also received two awards during the continental exhibition held in Buenos Aires in 1882.

The altar contains the image of the Virgin of Carmen (Our Lady of Mount Carmel). This belonged to the steamer "City of Santander", which sank near Lobos Island in 1829. The Marquess of Comillas, owner of the damaged steamer, saved it from the shipwreck and donated the now respected image. The image was reproduced as the "City of Santander" by Uruguayan painter Carlos María de Santiago.

To the left of the Altar is a polychrome image of a suffering Christ. It was found perfectly packed in a drawer that washed up on the seashore, without known origin or purpose: no one knows who made it, who it was for, or where it came from.

The cathedral was declared a National Historic Monument.

Apart from religious services, the cathedral is used for occasional concerts or choral performances.

== See also ==
- List of Roman Catholic cathedrals in Uruguay
- Roman Catholic Diocese of Maldonado-Punta del Este
