= Johann Jakob Wirz =

Johann Jakob Wirz (1778 in Basel – 1858) was a Swiss silkweaver who became known a Theosophist prophet and started a group called the Nazarenes, or in German Nazarener. His divine inspiration began around the end of 1823, and he soon gathered a small group, called the Nazarenes around him.

His works were published after his death as Jacob Wirz, Ein Zeugnis der Nazarener-Gemeinde von der Entwickelung des Reiches Gottes auf Erden (Barmen, 1862); this was followed by Briefe, letters in three volumes, (Barmen, 1863/1873).

It is not clear if this group has a direct connection to Samuel Heinrich Fröhlich (1803–1857) who was one of the founders of the German Nazarener movement which survives today only as the Nazarene Church in Romania with around 1,000 members. One theory has it that when the nineteen-year-old blacksmith Lajos Hencsey (1814–1844) came to Switzerland he met the disciples of Wirz and adopted their name instead of other numerous names circulating for Fröhlich's followers.
