= Apostolic Christian Church (Nazarene) =

Christian denomination of the Anabaptist movement

The Apostolic Christian Church (Nazarene) (Note: Also "Nazarean") (ACCN) is an Anabaptist Christian denomination aligned with the holiness movement. It is a branch of the Apostolic Christian Church formed in the early 1900s as the result of cultural differences with the Apostolic Christian Church of America (ACCA). Reunification meetings have taken place, and as early as 1916, it was decided upon to call each other Sister Churches. Unlike some other branches of the Froelich Family of churches, membership is respected across most of the ACCA and ACCN, with closed events such as Testimonies/Provings being open to members of both subdemoninations. The faith is widely spread across the globe, with congregations in Western Europe, Central and Eastern Europe, North America, Africa, Israel and Oceania.

== History ==
The church was founded in the early 1830s by Samuel Heinrich Fröhlich, a young seminary student in Switzerland, who had experienced a biblical conversion. Being led of God through a true conversion, he began preaching the simple truths of the Bible. Approximately 110 congregations were formed in 35 years in several European countries. Froehlich's intent was to organize a church based on a literal interpretation of God's Word. He emphasized the scriptural principle, "…teaching them to observe all things whatsoever I have commanded you" (Mt. 28:20). The church, while recognizing Froehlich's work, gives God the glory for all these accomplishments. Froehlich's attitudes and biblical understandings were shaped, in part, by the Sixteenth Century Anabaptists, whose doctrinal motto was "Sola Scriptura." This meant that Scriptures alone constituted the true foundation for doctrine and life-and they were to be followed. The church has continued over the years to diligently follow New Testament teachings, and to regard the entire Word as infallible and inerrant.

In Europe, the church was known as Evangelical Baptist. It later became known as Apostolic Christian in America. This name was chosen because the church follows the teachings of Christ and the Apostles.

=== United States and Canada ===
The Apostolic Christian Church took root in America in 1847, when a church was organized in Lewis County, New York. The site was in the Croghan-Naumburg area. Another church was formed a year later at Sardis, Ohio. From this beginning in America the church grew, primarily in the fertile farming areas of the Midwest. As immigrants came from Europe (mostly from the Froehlich churches) and new converts were added in the United States, the church flourished. The believers were zealous in living and spreading the Word in America. From the 1920s on, most of the new churches formed in America were founded in metropolitan areas. This was because many of the church's offspring sought occupational opportunities in areas other than farming. Thus, today the Apostolic Christian Church consists of a blend of city and rural churches.

=== Europe ===
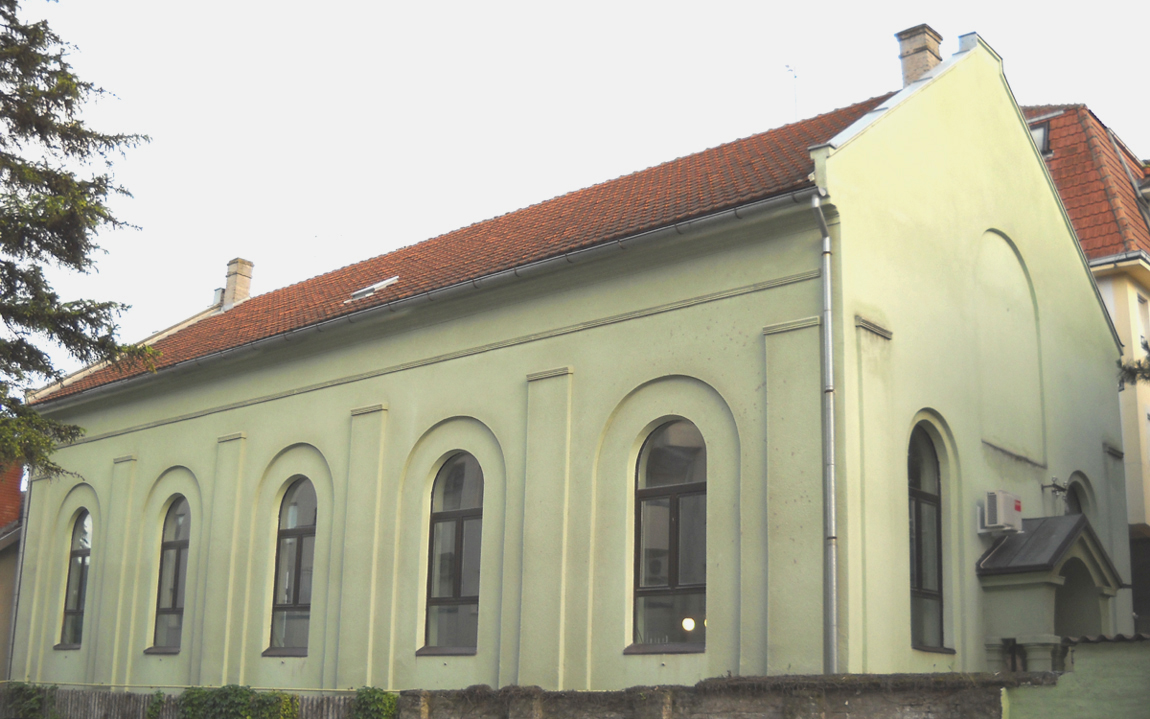
Prayer House of Nazarene Christian Community in Novi Sad, Serbia

The Nazarene community of Europe originated in the 1840s. Two visiting Hungarian locksmiths were converted by Samuel Heinrich Fröhlich (1803–57) around 1830, these men returned to Budapest and converted a nineteen-year-old locksmith Lajos Hencsey, who was to be known as the Hungarian Samuel Fröhlich, and his two companions János Denkel and János Kropacsek promoting Wirz and Fröhlich's teachings where it briefly flourished in Hungary, Serbia and Romania beginning in 1840. According to Peter Brock "by the beginning of the twentieth century the Nazarenes of Hungary numbered between 13,000 to 15,000." The group survives today primarily as the Nazirineni church in Romania, Nazarénusok in Transylvania and Hungary, with around 1,000 members. The Nazarenes were widely persecuted by their European authorities due their stance on peace and objection to weapons or war. During (and especially after) World War II many men were imprisoned and tortured for their beliefs.

== Beliefs and church practices ==
- Many churches have separate seating for men and women, depending on local custom and occasion.
- Leadership consists of one or more locally ordained elders assisted by one or more ministers.
- Informal attire is expected during church events. Women are encouraged to be modestly dressed
- Communion is served throughout the year for church members, most often near Easter and after baptism services.
- Converts generally wait for a time until a formal baptism is conducted.
- Different churches typically exchange "greetings" between each other and their members, either in person or at-large while any church events are shared (or "announced") to the congregation.
- A belief in two works of grace—the New Birth and entire sanctification (baptism of the Holy Spirit), characteristic of denominations aligned with the holiness movement

== Services ==
Most churches have the following:

- Sunday Morning Worship Service
- Sunday Afternoon Worship Service
- Sunday Evening Song Service
- Midweek Evening Worship Service
- A few churches also hold a Saturday Evening Song Service

== Locations ==
Spread throughout the world, churches can be found in many countries.

- Argentina, Brazil, Canada, Mexico, Paraguay and United States of America.
- Switzerland, Austria, Croatia, France, Germany, Hungary, Romania, Serbia, Slovakia, Sweden, and Ukraine.
- Australia, Japan and Papua New Guinea.
- Ghana, Africa.
- Although small, there is also a Nazarene church in Israel

Along with missionary work, the church also engages and operates in several nursing homes, schools, charities and orphanages.
