= Diocese of Minas =

Diocese of Minas Dioecesis Fodinensis

Catholic

Location
- Country: Uruguay
- Ecclesiastical province: Montevideo

Statistics
- Area: 16,200 km^{2} (6,300 sq mi)
- Population: Total; Catholics: (as of 2004); 71,100; 50,000 (70.3%)
- Parishes: 10

Information
- Denomination: Catholic Church
- Sui iuris church: Latin Church
- Rite: Roman Rite
- Established: 25 June 1960 (66 years ago)
- Dissolved: 2020
- Cathedral: Catedral de la Inmaculada Concepción

Leadership
- Pope: Leo XIV
- Bishop: (diocese suppressed)

Map
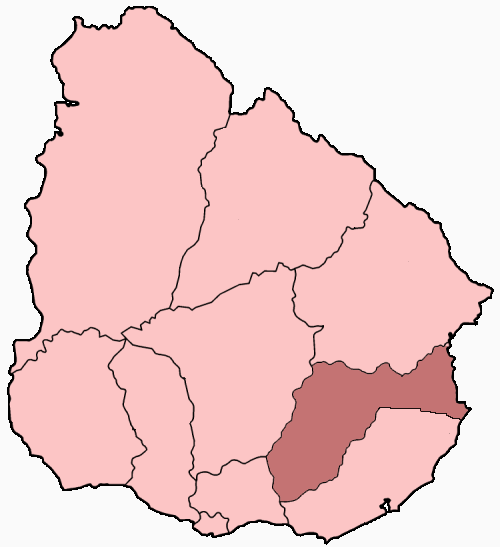

The Diocese of Minas (Latin: Dioecesis Fodinensis) is a former Latin Church ecclesiastical territory or diocese of the Catholic Church in Uruguay. When the final bishop of the diocese, Jaime Rafael Fuentes, retired in 2020, the Diocese of Minas was united with the Diocese of Maldonado-Punta del Este to form the Diocese of Maldonado-Punta del Este-Minas.

== History ==
The diocese was erected in 1960, and was a suffragan diocese in the ecclesiastical province of the metropolitan Archdiocese of Montevideo. This diocese coved the department of Lavalleja and northern portions of the departments of Rocha and Maldonado. Its cathedra was in the Cathedral of Minas.

The final bishop was Jaime Rafael Fuentes, who was appointed in 2010.

== Bishops ==
=== Ordinaries ===
- José Maria Cavallero † (9 Jul 1960 appointed – 29 May 1963 died)
- Edmondo Quaglia Martínez † (29 May 1964 appointed – 12 Jul 1976 died)
- Carlos Arturo Mullín Nocetti, S.J. † (3 Nov 1977 Appointed – 17 Mar 1985 Died)
- Victor Gil Lechoza † (9 Nov 1985 appointed – 21 Jun 2001 died)
- Rodolfo Wirz, as Apostolic administrator (June 2001 – March 2004)
- Francisco Domingo Barbosa Da Silveira † (6 Mar 2004 appointed – 1 Jul 2009 resigned)
- Rodolfo Wirz, as Apostolic administrator (July 2009 – October 2010)
- Jaime Rafael Fuentes (16 Oct 2010 appointed – 2 Mar 2020 retired)

=== Auxiliary bishop ===
- Carlos Arturo Mullín Nocetti, S.J. † (1972-1977), appointed Bishop here

=== Other priest of this diocese who became bishop ===
- Pablo Alfonso Jourdán Alvariza, appointed Auxiliary Bishop of Montevideo in 2018

== See also ==
- List of churches in the Diocese of Minas
- List of Roman Catholic dioceses in Uruguay
