= Francisco Domingo Barbosa Da Silveira =

Uruguayan Catholic bishop

Francisco Domingo Barbosa Da Silveira (26 March 1944 in Tambores, Uruguay – 17 June 2015) was a Roman Catholic bishop in Uruguay.

== Biography ==
Silveira studied Roman Catholic theology. On 17 June 1972, he was ordained a priest. On 6 March 2004, he was made bishop of the Roman Catholic Diocese of Minas. In 2009, he was extorted by two prisoners, with whom he had reportedly had previous same-sex sexual relations.

He subsequently resigned in accordance with the norms of canon law after an investigation from the Holy See.
