= Johnny Aquino =

Uruguayan footballer (born 1978)

Personal information
- Date of birth: December 22, 1978 (age 47)
- Place of birth: Maldonado, Uruguay
- Height: 1.75 m (5 ft 9 in)
- Position: Midfielder

Senior career*
Years	Team	Apps	(Gls)
1999–2000	Aldosivi de Mar del Plata	18	(1)
2000–2004	Defensores de Belgrano	136	(17)
2005	Ferro Carril Oeste	11	(0)
2005–2006	All Boys	28	(0)
2007–2011	Sarmiento de Junín	131	(6)
2011–2014	Gimnasia y Esgrima	91	(7)
2018	Villa Belgrano	0	(0)
- * Club domestic league appearances and goals

Johnny Aquino (born December 22, 1978) is a Uruguayan former footballer who played as a midfielder for clubs including Sarmiento de Junín of the Primera B Metropolitana in Argentina.
