= Diocese of Maldonado-Punta del Este =

Latin Catholic diocese in Uruguay

Coordinates: 34.9087°S 54.9592°W

Diocese of Maldonado-Punta del Este-Minas Dioecesis Maldonadensis-Orientalis Orae-Fodinensis Diócesis de Maldonado-Punta del Este-Mina

Catholic
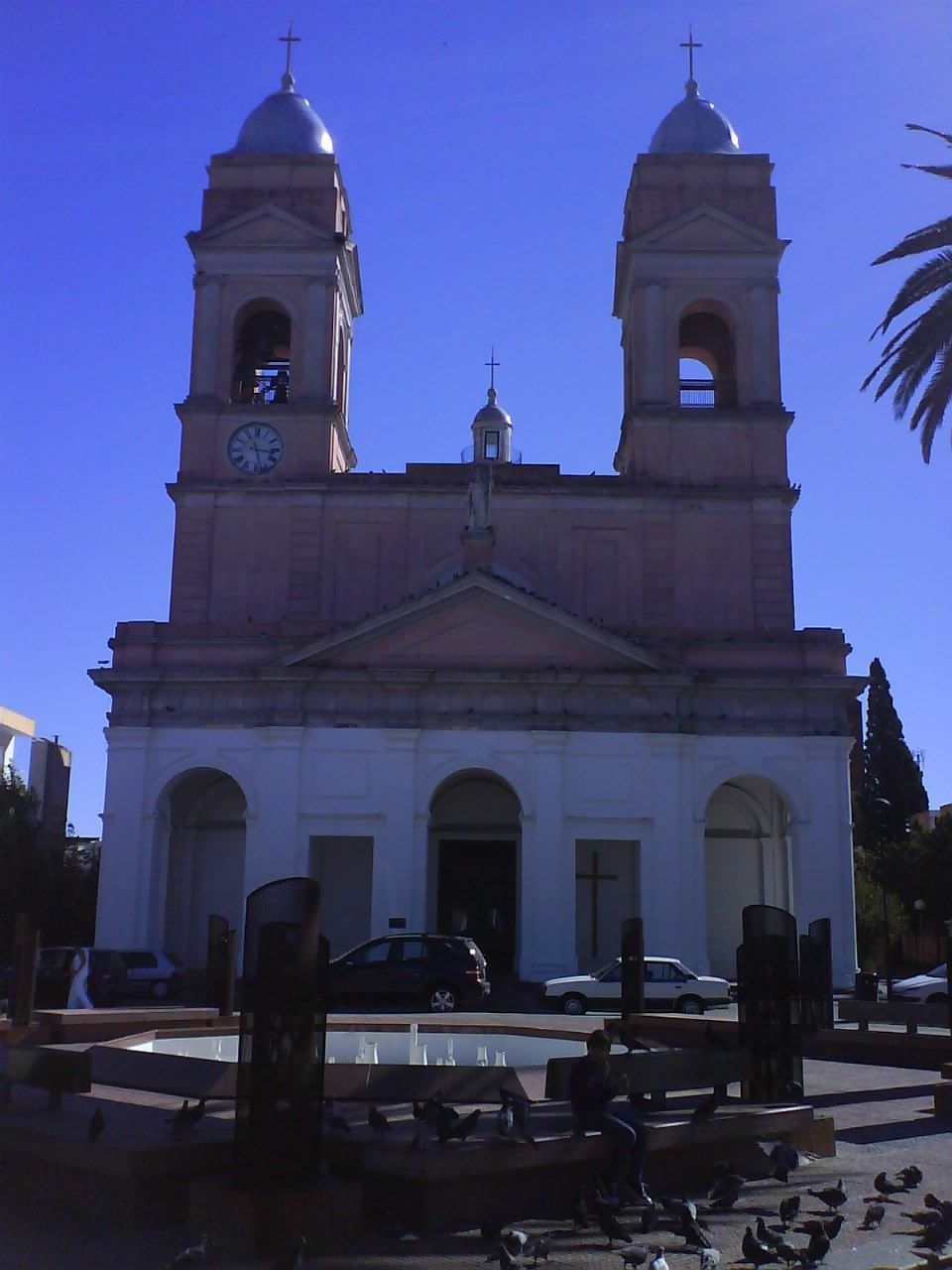
- Cathedral of St. Fernando

Location
- Country: Uruguay
- Ecclesiastical province: Montevideo

Statistics
- Area: 13,000 km^{2} (5,000 sq mi)
- Population: Total; Catholics: (as of 2004); 180,000; 160,000 (88.9%)
- Parishes: 15

Information
- Denomination: Catholic Church
- Rite: Roman Rite
- Established: 10 January 1966 (60 years ago)
- Cathedral: Catedral de San Fernando

Current leadership
- Pope: Leo XIV
- Bishop: Milton Luis Tróccoli Cebedio
- Bishops emeritus: Jaime Rafael Fuentes Martín; Rodolfo Pedro Wirz Kraemer

Map
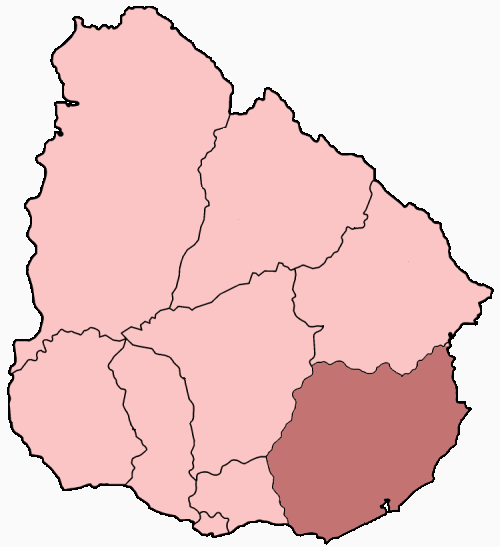

The Diocese of Maldonado-Punta del Este-Minas (Latin: Dioecesis Maldonadensis-Orientalis Orae-Fodinensis) is a diocese of the Latin Church of the Catholic church in Uruguay. It was the Diocese of Maldonado-Punta del Este until, on March 2, 2020, the Diocese of Minas was united with it.

== History ==
The diocese was erected in 1966, from the Diocese of Minas and is a suffragan of the Archdiocese of Montevideo. This diocese covers almost all the Department of Maldonado and the southern half of the Department of Rocha. Its see is at the Cathedral of Maldonado.

A previous bishop was Rodolfo Pedro Wirz Kraemer, who was appointed in 1985.

== Bishops ==
See Diocese of Minas, which has since united with this diocese, for bishops affiliated with it.

=== Ordinaries ===
Bishops of Maldonado-Punta del Este

- Antonio Corso † (26 Feb 1966 – 25 Mar 1985 Died)
- Rodolfo Pedro Wirz Kraemer (9 Nov 1985 – 15 Jun 2018)
- Milton Luis Tróccoli Cebedio (15 Jun 2018 - 2 Mar 2020); see below

Bishop of Maldonado-Punta del Este-Minas

- Milton Luis Tróccoli Cebedio (2 Mar 2020–present); see above

=== Another priest of this diocese who became bishop ===
- Luis Eduardo González Cedrés, appointed Auxiliary Bishop of Montevideo in 2018

== See also ==
- List of churches in the Diocese of Maldonado-Punta del Este
- List of Catholic dioceses in Uruguay
