= Apostolic Christian Church =

Anabaptist denomination

The Apostolic Christian Church (ACC) is a family of denominations tracing their origins to the work of Samuel Heinrich Fröhlich; the tradition is also known outside of North America and Australia as The Community of Evangelical Anabaptists, Nazareans, or Fröhlichians. The Apostolic Christian Church belongs to the Anabaptist tradition, along with being one of the first groups to embrace Evangelicalism in Europe, this led to fast growth that slowed as the churches slowly adapted to a growing amount of old Anabaptist converts in the United States. The Apostolic Christian Church practices credobaptism, closed communion, greeting other believers with a holy kiss, a capella worship in some branches (in others, singing is with piano), and the headcovering of women during services. The Apostolic Christian Church ordains only men, who are authorized to administer baptism, the Lord's Supper, and the laying on of hands.

== History ==
The origins of the Apostolic Christian Church are found in the conversion experience of Samuel Heinrich Froehlich (1803–57) of Switzerland. Froehlich was baptized in 1832 and soon founded the Evangelical Baptist Church. The first American church was formed in Lewis County, New York, in 1847 by Benedict Weyeneth (1819–87), who had been sent by Froehlich at the request of Joseph Virkler, a Lewis County minister in an Alsatian Amish-Mennonite church. In 1848 a church was formed in Sardis, Ohio. The church experienced primary growth in the Midwest, where many congregations gained membership from other Anabaptist denominations, chiefly local Amish and Mennonite churches. In Europe, and New York, these believers generally called themselves Evangelical Baptist, but as the church spread through the US, they used names such as Apostolic Christian, Christian Apostolic, and sometimes New Amish due to the term 'Baptist' referring to another tradition separate from Anabaptism. In 1917, the church adopted a uniform name: Apostolic Christian Church.

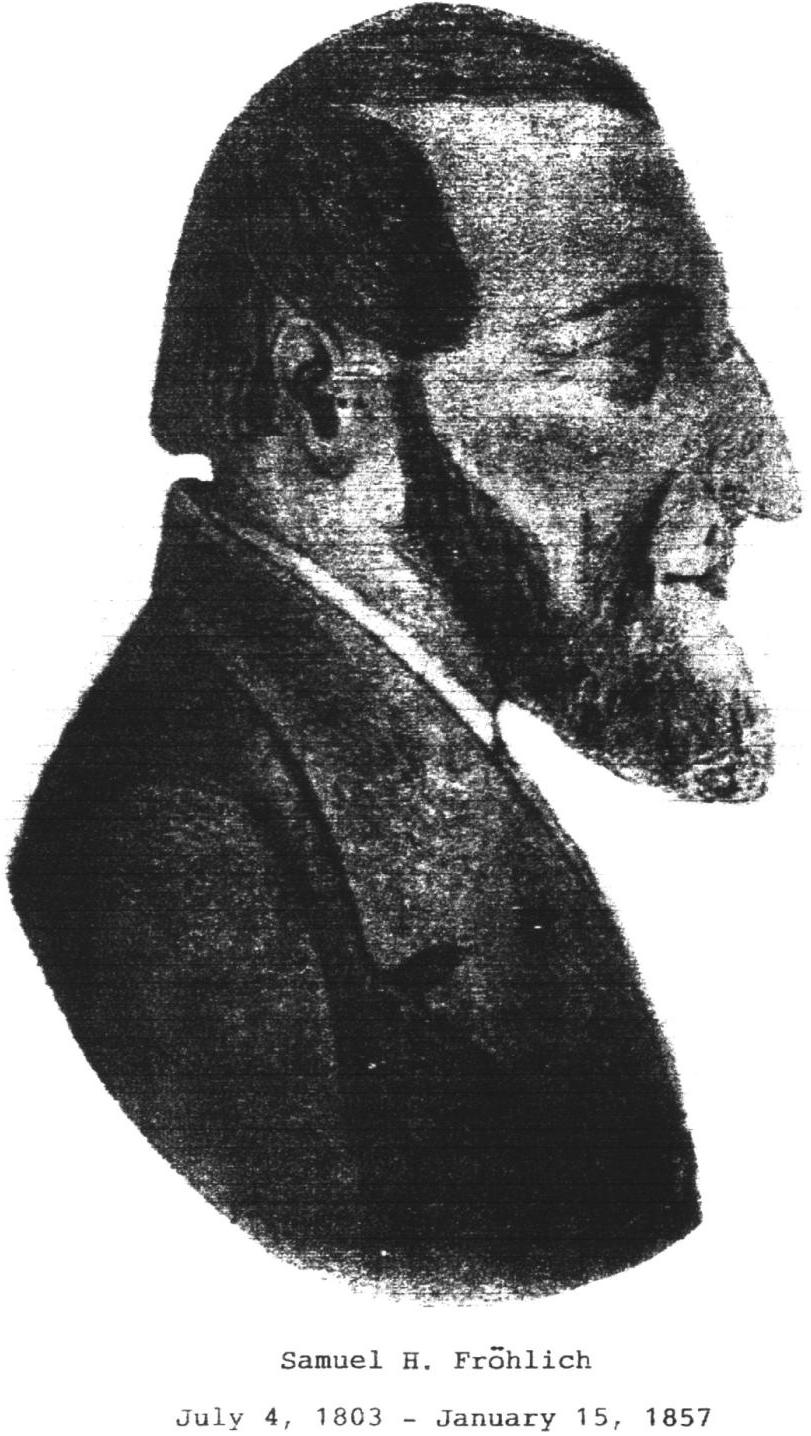
A sketch of Froehlich; the only known surviving likeness of him.

== Branches ==
There are currently at least five main divisions of this church in America. In the early 1900s a disagreement arose over the practice of some European customs (namely, the wearing of a mustache) and the church split into two bodies (from 1901 to 1911). In 1932 a second schism originated from a letter sent by elders in Europe asking for greater adherence to traditional teachings and practices. Those adhering to the request of the letter separated themselves from the Apostolic Christian Church of America and became known as the Christian Apostolic Church (later the German Apostolic Christian Church). The Apostolic Christian Church of America did not retain German language preaching. It is a common misconception that German language preaching was a primary issue in the division.

- The Apostolic Christian Church of America has about 93 congregations in 22 states, including 1 church in Canada, 5 in Mexico, and 2 in Japan. The total number of members is approximately 11,500, with around 19,000 attendees. This church has a national missionary committee/humanitarian aid program called HarvestCall, eleven retirement communities/nursing homes for the elderly, a home for people with developmental disabilities (Apostolic Christian Timber Ridge) in Morton, Illinois, Apostolic Christian Counseling & Family Services in Morton, IL, and a children's home in Leo, Indiana.
- The Apostolic Christian Church (Nazarean) has 32 congregations in the United States, with 1850 members and 2900 attendees, 11 congregations in Canada with about 800 members and 1000 attendees, 6 congregations in Australia with roughly 200 members, 16 congregations in Argentina with about 1200 members, one congregation the Republic of Hungary with roughly 1,000–2,000 members as well as congregations in Brazil and Mexico. They have mission work in New Guinea, Argentina, Zambia, and Paraguay. Though the minority of the split, this body remained in fellowship with the European churches. There is also a small congregation of Nazareans in Israel.
- The Nazarene Christian Congregation is the result of a split during World War II which had to do with disagreements in caving to Communist demands in Yugoslavia. This church also split into two sides during the early 2000s. The NCC has churches in former Yugoslavia, Australia, United States, and Canada, with more members in Yugoslavia than anywhere else. In North America and Australia the church has shrunk considerably.
- The German Apostolic Christian Church has several congregations in the United States and Europe. As of 2020, there are about 135 members in the United States, primarily in Illinois and Oregon, and this is down from 150 in 2017. This German Apostolic Christian Church is the result of a relatively small group splitting away from the Apostolic Christian Church in 1932 and 1933 with currently four congregations: Cissna Park, IL; Fairbury, IL; Peoria, IL; and Silverton, OR. Formerly it had also a congregation in Sabetha, KS, this became one of the Christian Apostolic Churches after 1955. Until 1955 this church was known as Christian Apostolic Church, afterwards it named itself German Apostolic Christian Church. The German language was up to 2020 still used in the forenoon Sunday worship service, but not anymore as the internal group's language or mother language. After the death of their last chief elder, Robert Hari, in 2019 they switched to English totally in avt. 2020 and relaxed some rules in regard of visitations and fellowship with non-member families. German school in the evening once per week also stopped since.
- The Christian Apostolic Church (formed in 1955 from a split with the German Apostolic Christian) has five churches in Bluffton, IN; Creston, OH; Forrest, IL; Salem, OR; and Sabetha, KS with approximately 100 members. A unification on the weekend of 4 July 2021 resulted in the addition of the Bluffton, IN and Creston, OH churches.. Quite a number of other Christian Apostolic groups existed for a while beside this bigger group, some still do today as home gatherings. This new group retained its old church name in opposition to its mother group. Members have retained traditional teachings on divorce and remarriage, sins unto death, baptism, the head covering, voting, birth control, and higher education, whereas the Apostolic Christian Church of America and Apostolic Christian Church (Nazarean) have departed somewhat from earlier practice in these areas. In the 1990s there was a large migration from the Christian Apostolic Church to the ACCA. In 2020/25 there was a small migration from the ACCA and ACF to the Christian Apostolic Church. Prior to this migration, the Christian Apostolic Church had slowly been moving closer to the ACCA on most stances. However, due to this migration, there has been a revival of its more traditional stance on issues.
- in 1966, Christian Apostolic Church of Fairbury, broke off of the Christian Apostolic Church. This is a single congregation, and has an aging membership.
- The Apostolic Christian Faith Church (formed in 2012 from a split with the Apostolic Christian Church of America) has two churches in Canada, and about 25 churches in the United States with approximately 1,100 members. Members have retained what they believe are the church's traditional teachings and doctrine. Their manner of worship and fellowship is currently very similar to the church they withdrew from. However, they reject the New Evangelical thinking that they believe has influenced a portion of the Apostolic Christian Church of America.
- Project Amazon, Currently known as PAZ International, is a Mission outreach started by members of the ACCA, with support from the ACCN. They currently have over 800 churches in Brazil, Italy, Japan, Portugal, and the United States.

=== Other divisions and smaller groups ===
The European German language bodies (Neutäufer) have also faced divisions. Although once united throughout Germany, Austria and Switzerland, there are now four sides. The following two (one could say also three) sides belong to the beard (moustache)-accepting side:

- During the 1980s members and leaders were pushing for more liberties, which resulted in a vast majority of churches changing their doctrine and rules to more evangelical/free church standards. Reasons were also, that the church leaders saw no future in keeping the old ways. They formed their own branch (Bund Evangelischer Täufergemeinden) and adopted the name Evangelische Täufergemeinde for most congregations. They currently have churches in Germany, Switzerland, Austria and France (Alsace) and quote to have about 2500 members.
- The small fraction that did not join and emphasized more traditional/conservative standards call themselves Gemeinde Evangelisch Taufgesinnter (Nazarener) with churches in Germany and Austria and formerly about 400 members.
- Some of these German Nazarener congregations do not fellowship with each other, so one could speak of two sides: moderate/liberal minded Nazarener congregations and conservative/traditional minded ones. Both sides are partly in a process to dissolve. The conservative Nazarener congregations maintain strong ties with the rest of the Nazarene congregations, especially to the Balkan states and are led by the Breidenbach congregation.
- There are some congregations of German Apostolic Christians in Germany and in Switzerland since the beginnings of 20th century:
  - Three in Germany which call themselves Gemeinschaft evangelisch Taufgesinnter-Altmennoniten plus one close to Basel, Switzerland, which is a dependence of the Swiss Basel congregation.
  - Ten (or eleven if one takes Kandergrund-Steffisburg as two congregations) in Switzerland, one thereof is in the Emmental at Bärau/Langnau. The Swiss German Apostolics have over 200–250 members, the German ones under 100. There have been official affiliations with the American side up to 2011. These congregations are the remnants of the beard-refusing-side in Europe. Formerly they had been the majority of all Neutäufer congregations in Switzerland and Germany, but their membership shrank immensely during the last decades.

The remainder of Europe is made up of independent congregations in communion:

- Nazarenes – in Sweden, Hungary, Serbia, Croatia, Romania, Ukraine and Slovakia
  - In Hungary their official name is Krisztusban Hívő Nazarénusok Gyülekezete (Congregation of Nazarenes Believing in Christ)

Australia has several churches that are in fellowship with the NCC, and many Apostolic Christian(Nazarean) churches that are loosely in fellowship, but not under the same elder body as the US Churches.

South America has several Nazarean groups such as the Igreja Evangélica Nazareno, and Igreja Nazareno Pentecostal in Brazil, and several Apostolic Christian Church (Nazarean) churches in Argentina, and Paraguay.

== Conversion ==
The conversion experienced by each member varies in timing and detail, but all include repentance for one's sins, making restitution, confessing sins to God while in the presence of an elder of the church, and finding peace with God. The word "convert" or the term “seeking” for those beginning formal inquiry into the faith, are used throughout the denomination to describe anyone who begins repentance but has not been baptized into the church; it does not imply conversion from another denomination or religion, but from the carnal to the spiritual state. Once converts "receive peace from God," this is announced to the church and a baptism date is set. Converts give a testimony before the members of the church prior to the public baptism service, telling the story of their personal conversion experience. This testimony, commonly referred to as a "proving", typically takes place the night before the baptism and is a closed member meeting. Because baptism is identified with a "death to sin" in Romans 6 and other New Testament writings, congregational recognition of the convert's repentance and death to sin is desired prior to baptism. The baptism service is open for anyone to attend and is performed before the entire congregation. Before the baptism takes place, the convert makes a covenant with Christ in the presence of the entire congregation. Once the covenant is made, the convert is fully immersed in water (unless they are physically unable to do so). After the baptism service, there is a laying on of hands by one or more elders and an accompanying consecration prayer. This laying on of hands and prayer of consecration places the seal of the Holy Spirit on the life of the newly baptized. In some of the branches, such as the Nazarene branch, this service is for members and converts only.

== Worship, biblical practices and tradition ==
=== Worship ===
- In general, the Authorized Version (King James Version) of the Bible is the English translation used for church services in North American congregations. Some congregations use the corresponding translation in another language, such as Spanish (RVR 1960), Romanian, or Hungarian.
- Worship services are held on Sunday while various churches also conduct additional mid-week services.
- Sunday services in the ACCA (the Nazarean order of services) are similar in a few churches but widely vary in others, the order of worship in the Christian Apostolic Church and German Apostolic Christian Church are essentially identical—this is basically the same order of worship used in old order German Baptist, Mennonite and Amish churches as follows:
  - To honor and sanctify the Lord's Day, services of worship are held in the morning and afternoon, usually of the following format:
    - The congregation sings several songs before the service starts
    - The congregation prays together in silence asking for the Holy Spirit's leadership
    - A minister opens to a random Old Testament passage, and sometimes discusses it briefly
    - The minister selects a hymn to be sung by the congregation, the congregation sings, and then the minister prays out loud
    - The minister opens to a random passage in the New Testament – this passage serves as the basis of most of the sermon, although the Old Testament passage (or fore-reading) is often referred to as well. This minister will preach for the majority of the sermon.
    - A second minister provides some closing or summarizing thoughts and either selects a closing hymn or asks the congregation to suggest one
    - A minister gives the opportunity for a male member of the congregation to lead the group in prayer
    - A minister "takes greetings". Members stand up and announce other AC churches that they have recently traveled to or are traveling from
    - A final hymn is sometimes sung following the afternoon service.
  - A meal is generally served between the morning and afternoon services
- Midweek services consist of a single service, generally of the same format as the Sunday services
- Some congregations conduct Bible studies and classes as part of the routine church schedule. In addition, some local fellowships have outside study groups and classes among members. However, there is no standard format for these bible studies across all churches. Some congregations do not encourage Bible studies among groups of members. Personal Bible study is always encouraged and expected.
- Female members are expected to wear a Christian headcovering during prayer and worship. Wearing of a head covering when praying outside of church, when with other believers, and at other times is encouraged to varying degrees among the congregations, but the Biblical basis is somewhat universally recognized. Not every Apostolic Christian Church practices the women's headcovering; however, it is seen in most.
- Within the Apostolic Christian Churches (Nazarean), singing usually includes piano playing, and (on occasion) includes other instruments.
- The Zionsharfe (Zion's Harp) is the primary hymnal used during worship services. The Zion's Harp was assembled in the 19th century by a European elder, George Michael Mangold, and includes numerous hymns written by him, along with other hymns not generally used in other American denominations. Most of the hymns are either traditional Amish/Mennonite hymns or from the 19th-century Swiss state church. It is a good source for English metrical translations of Amish Ausbund hymns. Because the Apostolic Christian Church of America and the Apostolic Christian Church (Nazarene) were separated before both sides began using English in worship services, the Zion's Harps used by the two denominations have lyrics somewhat differently translated from the German. When the ACCA revised their Zions Harp in the 50's, many of the ACCN Verses were added because the original translators only translated the first 3 verses on many of the songs. A slightly different translation is also used in the Christian Apostolic Church.
- Another hymnal used in church services, the Hymns of Zion, includes arrangements and lyrics more commonly used in other denominations, but also includes several written by members of the American congregations. This hymnal was created as a combination of other hymnals previously used in the ACCA Churches, The Heft(Long Book)(which is included in the ACCN's Zion's Harp), and Songs of Praise and Worship. These books were selections of classic, and modern Hymns at their time of publishing. The Hymns of Zion was published around 20 years after Songs of Praise and Worship to combine the two. This step merged the current Sunday School and Sanctuary secondary hymnal into one, while adding new songs that had become popular in the 20 years between the two books publications. Starting around 2002, many ACCA churches have transitioned from the Hymns of Zion to the new "combined hymnal" which is a combination of the Hymns of Zion and the Tabernacle Hymns. The latter was used by several churches, and the combination served to keep the church united while keeping both sets of hymns in use. Some churches still use the Gospel Hymns, or Heavenly Highways in the sanctuary, but most use them as Fellowship Hall books.
- In 2023 the ACCA published a new hymnal, the Hymns of Worship that includes selections from the time the Hymns of Zion was published to today, along with some classic hymns from the Gospel Hymns and Heavenly Highways that were not included in the Hymns of Zion. This Hymnal is in Sanctuary use by several ACCA churches, others are using it for singing in the home only, and others due to the contemporary style music and biblical inaccuracy of some of the songs are not using it at all.

=== Biblical practices and tradition ===
- Communion is served once (to several times) a year at varying times, usually near Easter or near to a Baptism. Communion services are a closed service, with only members and converts present. Communion is typically preceded by a period, typically around a month, of self-examination and restitution, if needed.
- The Holy Kiss is the greeting used in Apostolic Christian churches (practiced as in German Baptist, Amish, Mennonite churches, and other Anabaptist churches), based on the epistles of Paul and the general epistle of 1 Peter. Men greet men and women greet women. Men and women just shake hands and say "Greetings Brother" and "Greetings Sister."
- Marriage between "a man and a woman of like mind, faith, and fellowship" is encouraged for all members where God leads. In the Apostolic Christian Church of America, Christian Apostolic Church, German Apostolic Christian Church, and the Apostolic Christian Church (Nazarean), dating is discouraged.
- Members of the Apostolic Christian Church of America, and Apostolic Christian Church [Nazarean], are somewhat discouraged from visiting churches of other denominations. In the German Apostolic Christian Church, visitors are requested to obtain an elder's permission before attending services, and members do not visit other services, even for wedding or funerals.
- In all traditional AC groups, permanent lifelong excommunication is practiced in certain cases.
- In 1932 all Apostolic Christian groups required a beard without mustache (except the Nazareans), but by the 1950s it was discouraged in all groups. In 2017, The ACCA elder body rescinded the expectation that male members be clean-shaven.
- In the ACCA and ACC Nazarean, members are encouraged to wear modest attire that provides gender distinction.
- The Apostolic Christian Church observes the Lord's Day through the holding of public worship in the morning and in the afternoon. A communal meal is shared in between these services. Singings are held on Sunday evenings. The Apostolic Christian Church theology of the Lord's Day is reflected in the hymn "Joy on the Lord's Day".

== Leadership ==
The all-male leadership of an Apostolic Christian church consists of the "elders" of local congregations. The term "elder" has a somewhat different meaning from that in other denominations. Most congregations have one elder, however some have none and in rare instances a congregation may have more than one. The office of elder is seen as equivalent to that of a bishop as described in the epistles of 1 Timothy and Titus. The elder of each congregation has the oversight of the local congregation but is subject to the authority of the other elders throughout the denomination. Once put in place, Ministers, Deacons and Elders can only be removed of their position by death, voluntary retirement or in extreme cases by the national elder body.

=== Elders ===
- Elders of local congregations are ordained by the Elders of the other congregations, usually after a ballot is taken from the local congregation. Elders are usually selected from the current ministers serving in the local church. Elders perform both religious rites and also conduct ministerial duties.
- Congregations who do not have a locally residing elder are assigned a "Counseling Elder" by the national elder body. Day-to-day business in these congregations is usually handled by an Ordained Deacon, Deacon or "Lead Minister"; depending on the specific situation of each congregation.
- Each local church Elder serves as an equal member within the collective "Elder Body" of all elders who make decisions regarding the denomination.

=== Deacons and ministers ===
- Ministers' duties include both preaching and teaching in their home congregation and in other Apostolic Christian congregations. They also assist the Elder or Deacon as the need arises in their home congregation.
- Ministers (including elders and deacons) do not pursue seminary or other education in preparation for the ministry and serve without compensation. An unpaid lay ministry is not considered a doctrinal issue, but a preference for it is recognized in Paul's writings.
- A minister who is ordained as a deacon may assist the local elder with meeting with new converts, performing baptisms, and other duties usually carried out by the elder alone. Most congregations do not have a Deacon, rather they are ordained mostly in very large congregations where the elder needs assistance, or in very small congregations where there is no local elder.

== Footnotes ==
- "Froehlich" is for all intents and purposes an anglicization of Fröhlich, although use of "oe" (or a similar digraph with a smaller "e" atop the "o") to denote the same sound actually predates the use of the umlaut in written German.

== Sources ==
- Anderson, Cory. 2018. "A Socio-Religious Introduction to the Apostolic Churches in North America." Journal of Amish and Plain Anabaptist Studies 6(1):26-60. doi:10.18061/1811/86026
- Bojan, Aleksov. 1999. "The Dynamics of Extinction: The Nazarene Religious Community in Yugoslavia after 1945." Thesis in History. Budapest, Hungary: Central European University.
- Djurić-Milovanović, Aleksandra. 2018. "'Our Faith Is Good, but Strict': The Transformation of the Apostolic Christian Church-Nazarene in North America." Journal of Amish and Plain Anabaptist Studies 6(1):61-72. doi:10.18061/1811/86025
- Djurić-Milovanović, Aleksandra. 2017. "Alternative Religiosity in Communist Yugoslavia: Migration as a Survival Strategy of the Nazarene Community." Open Theology 3(1):447-57.
- Djurić-Milovanović, Aleksandra. 2017. ""On the Road to Religious Freedom": A Study of the Nazarene Emigration from Southeastern Europe to the United States." Journal of Ethnography and Folklore 1–2.
- Pfeiffer, Joseph. 2018. "The Nineteenth Century Apostolic Christian Church: The Dynamics of the Emergence, Establishment, and Fragmentation of a Neo-Anabaptist Sect." Journal of Amish and Plain Anabaptist Studies 6(1):1-25. doi:10.18061/1811/86027
- Pfeiffer, Joseph. 2010. "Between Remnant and Renewal: A Historical and Comparative Study of the 'Apostolic Christian Church' among Neo-Anabaptist Renewal Movements in Europe and America." Thesis. Elkhart, IN: Associated Mennonite Biblical Seminary.
