= Cathedral of Minas =

Coordinates: 34.3787°S 55.2365°W

- Cathedral of the Immaculate Conception of Minas
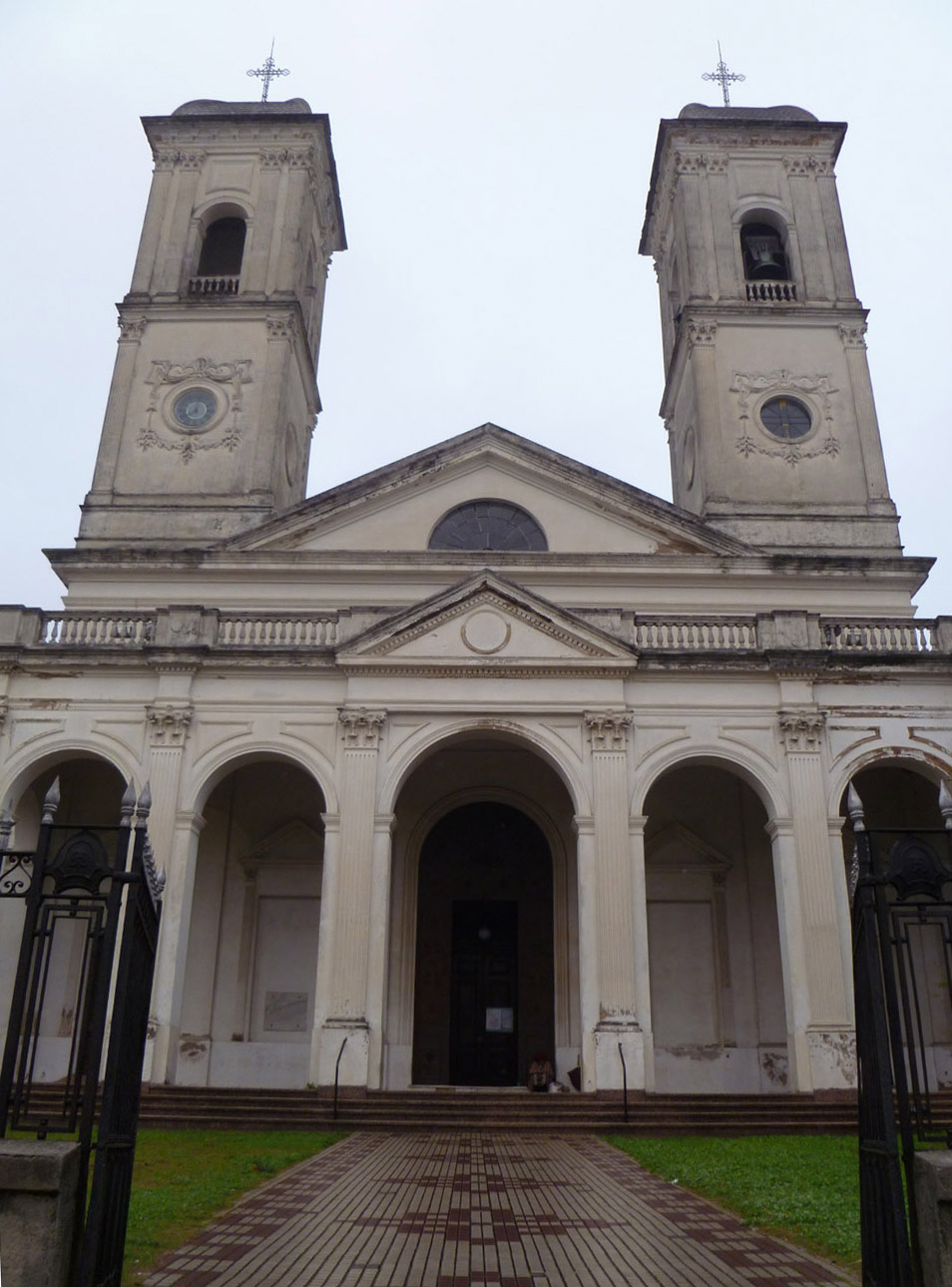
- Cathedral of Minas
- Location: Minas
- Country: Uruguay
- Denomination: Roman Catholic

History
- Dedication: Immaculate Conception
- Consecrated: 1892

Architecture
- Functional status: Cathedral
- Architectural type: Neoclassical

Administration
- Diocese: Diocese of Minas

The Cathedral of the Immaculate Conception (Spanish: Catedral de la Inmaculada Concepción) is the main Roman Catholic church building of Minas, Uruguay. It was the see of the Roman Catholic Diocese of Minas from 1960 till 2020.

Built in Neoclassical style, it was consecrated in 1892. It is dedicated to the Immaculate Conception of the Virgin Mary.

== Same devotion ==
There are many other churches in Uruguay dedicated to the Immaculate Conception:

- Church of the Immaculate Conception in Rivera
- Cathedral of the Immaculate Conception, St. Philip and St. James in Montevideo

== See also ==
- List of Roman Catholic cathedrals in Uruguay
- Roman Catholic Diocese of Minas
