= Milton Luis Tróccoli Cebedio =

Uruguayan Roman Catholic prelate (born 1964)

The Most Reverend Milton Luis Tróccoli Cebedio
- Bishop of Maldonado-Punta del Este-Minas
- Church: Roman Catholic Church
- Diocese: Maldonado-Punta del Este-Minas
- See: Maldonado-Punta del Este-Minas
- Appointed: 2 March 2020
- Installed: 15 March 2020
- Other post: Secretary General of the Uruguayan Episcopal Conference (2016-)
- Previous posts: Titular Bishop of Munatiana (2009-18); Auxiliary Bishop of Montevideo (2009-18); Bishop of Maldonado-Punta del Este (2018-20)

Orders
- Ordination: 8 May 1988 by Pope John Paul II
- Consecration: 20 December 2009 by Nicolás Cotugno Fanizzi

Personal details
- Born: Milton Luis Tróccoli Cebedio; 3 March 1964 (age 62) Montevideo, Uruguay
- Motto: Nos apremia el amor de Cristo

Milton Luis Tróccoli Cebedio (born 3 March 1964 in Montevideo) is a Uruguayan Roman Catholic prelate.

He attended seminary at El Seminario Mayor de Montevideo, studying theology and philosophy. He was ordained as a priest in 1988 by Pope John Paul II, on the occasion of his second visit to Uruguay. On 27 November 2009 he was appointed titular bishop of Munatiana and Auxiliary Bishop of Montevideo. On 8 July 2018, he was appointed Bishop of Maldonado-Punta del Este, and the see changed to Maldonado-Punta del Este-Minas on 2 March 2020 when the diocese of Minas was joined to it.
