= Torre del Vigía =

Watchtower in Maldonado, Uruguay

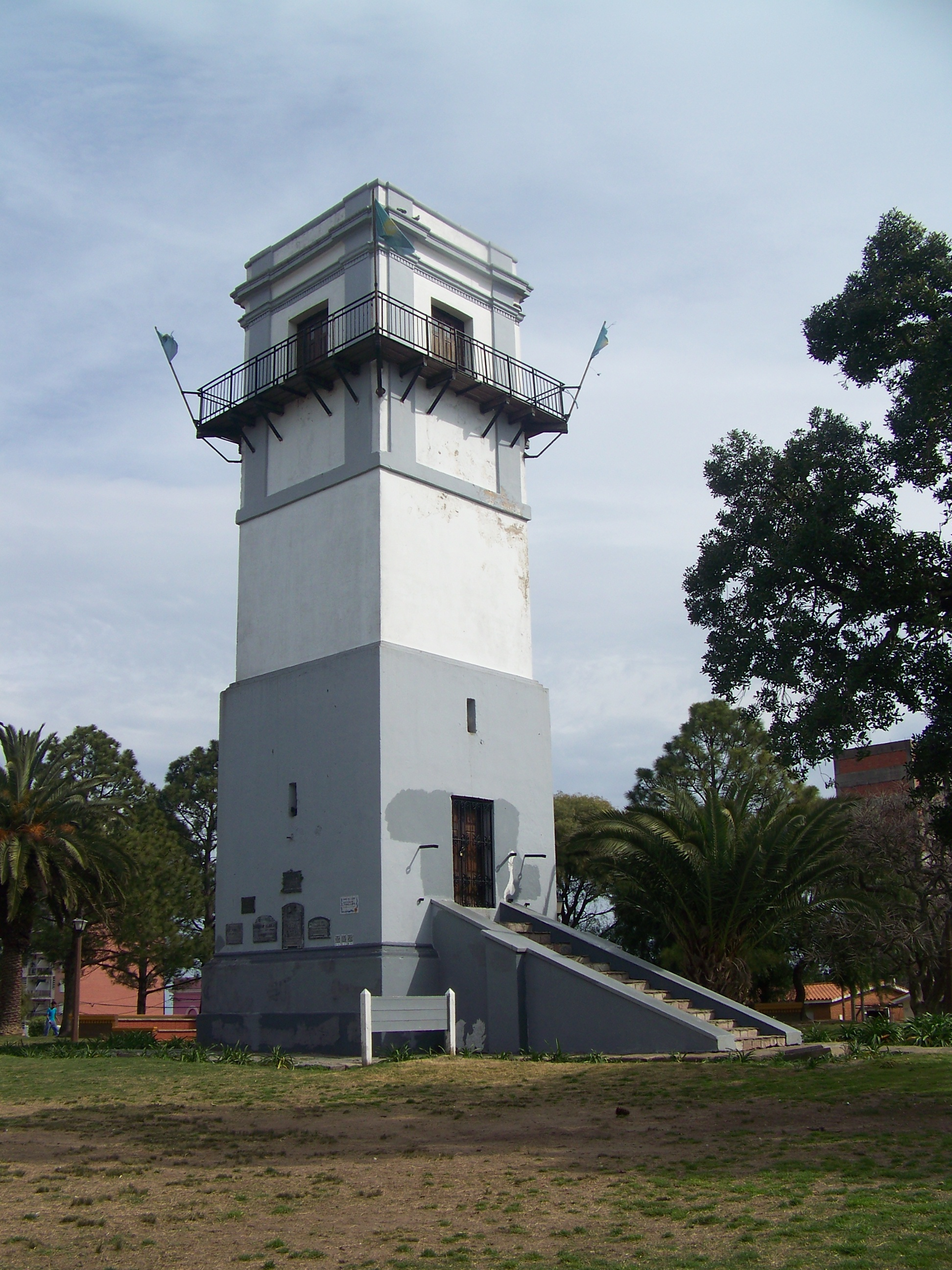
- Building in 2013
- Interactive map of the Torre del Vigía area

General information
- Status: Completed
- Type: Watchtower
- Architectural style: Neoclassical
- Location: Plaza del Vigía; Maldonado, Uruguay
- Coordinates: 34.9104°S 54.9614°W
- Completed: 1799

Height
- Height: 13 m (43 ft)

The Torre del Vigía (English: Watchtower) is a tower located in central Maldonado, Uruguay. It is located in the Plaza del Vigía. The building was constructed during the Uruguayan colonial period.

== Design ==
The building has a height of 13 m (43 ft) and a width of 5 m (16 ft). It is located at an elevation of 39 m (128 ft) on a hill where Maldonado was founded, making it one of the highest points in the city. The building was constructed of brick. Access to the tower is provided via a stone staircase, leading to the top of the building. The Torre del Vigía also contains an observation deck.

== History ==
The construction of a lookout tower in Maldonado was ordered by Uruguayan viceroy Antonio Olaguer y Feliú in 1797. The building was designed in order to monitor the Río de la Plata estuary, which at the time had become the focal point of several foreign incursions. The tower was designed by Rafael Pérez del Puerto and was completed in 1799. In 1816, the tower was briefly occupied by Portuguese forces, who had taken control of Maldonado.

The building remains a preserved site by the city of Maldonado.
