= Rodolfo Wirz =

Uruguayan Roman Catholic prelate (1942–2025)

- Bishop Emeritus of Maldonado-Punta del Este
- Archdiocese: Montevideo
- Diocese: Maldonado-Punta del Este
- Appointed: 9 November 1985
- Term ended: 15 June 2018
- Predecessor: Antonio Corso
- Successor: Milton Luis Tróccoli Cebedio

Orders
- Ordination: 21 December 1968
- Consecration: 21 December 1985 by José Gottardi Cristelli

Personal details
- Born: 19 April 1942 Schwarzrheindorf, Gau Cologne-Aachen, Germany
- Died: 9 December 2025 (aged 83) Montevideo, Uruguay
- Denomination: Roman Catholic
- Residence: Maldonado, Uruguay
- Motto: Crean en la buena nueva
- Coat of arms

Styles of Rodolfo Pedro Wirz Kraemer
- Reference style: His Excellency; The Most Reverend
- Spoken style: Your Excellency
- Religious style: Bishop

Rodolfo Pedro Wirz Kraemer (19 April 1942 – 9 December 2025) was an Uruguayan Roman Catholic prelate.

Wirz was born on 19 April 1942 in Schwarzrheindorf near Bonn, Germany. Ordained on 21 December 1968, he was appointed Bishop of Maldonado on 9 November 1985. He retired on 15 June 2018.

From 2013, he presided over the Episcopal Conference of Uruguay. Wirz died in Montevideo on 9 December 2025 at the age of 83.

Catholic Church titles
Preceded by Antonio Corso	Bishop of Maldonado-Punta del Este; 1985–2018	Succeeded by Milton Luis Tróccoli Cebedio
