= Apostolic Christian Church of America =

Anabaptist Christian denomination

The Apostolic Christian Church of America (ACCA) is an Anabaptist Christian denomination, based in the United States, and a branch of the Apostolic Christian Church. The denomination consists of approximately 90 congregations in the United States, Japan, Mexico and Canada.

== History ==
The origins of the Apostolic Christian Church are found in the conversion experience of Samuel Heinrich Froehlich (1803–57) of Switzerland. Froehlich was baptized in 1832 and soon founded the Evangelical Baptist Church. The first American church was formed in Lewis County, New York in 1847 by Benedict Weyeneth (1819–87), who had been sent by Froehlich at the request of Joseph Virkler, a Lewis County minister in an Alsatian Amish-Mennonite church. In 1848 a church was formed in Sardis, Ohio. The church experienced primary growth in the midwest, where many congregations gained membership from local Amish and Mennonite churches. Though sometimes referred to as the New Amish, these believers generally called themselves Evangelical Baptist. In 1917, the church adopted a uniform name: Apostolic Christian Church.

From the 1920s on, most of the new churches formed in America were founded in metropolitan areas. This was because many of the church's offspring sought occupational opportunities outside of farming. Thus, today the Apostolic Christian Church consists of a blend of city and rural congregations.

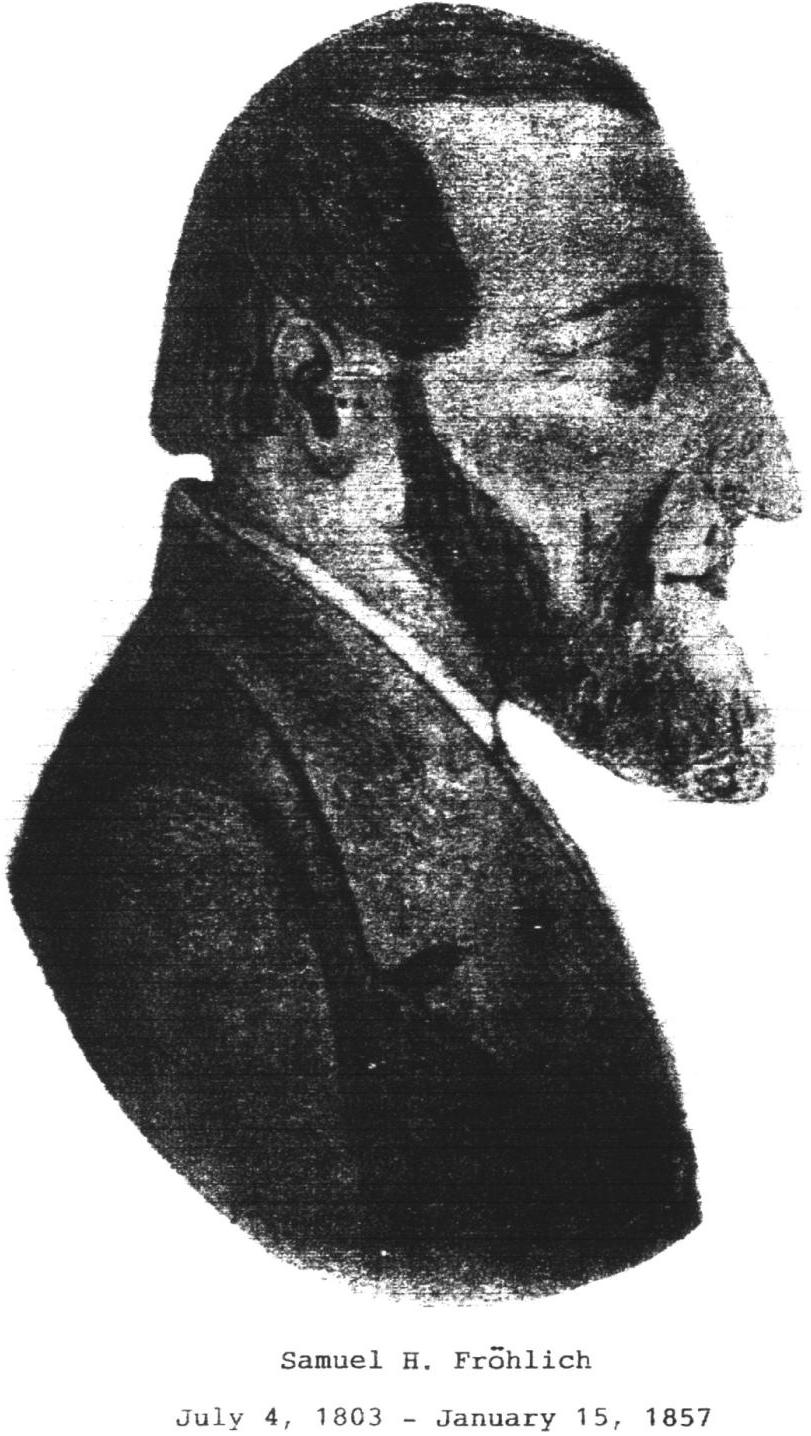
A sketch of Froehlich; the only known surviving likeness of him

== Biblical practices, traditions and beliefs ==
- Members seek to obey the Bible, which they hold to be the infallible Word of God. Many of their practices are biblically inspired traditions derived from the writings of Froehlich (who was strongly influenced by early church writers such as Tertullian) and some are past practices believed to be beneficial. These traditions are passed from one generation to the next and are held in high esteem, but they are never meant to approach the level of Biblical commandments. Traditions within the Apostolic Christian Church are said to help encourage believers in their commitment to serving the Lord, help to knit generations together, and provide close harmony among the various congregations.
- Holy Communion is served typically once, or possibly multiple times, during the year for church members, often (but not necessarily) near Easter. The Holy Communion service is a closed service, with only members present. Holy Communion is typically preceded by a period, typically around a month, of self-examination and restitution.
- The Holy Kiss is the greeting used in most Apostolic Christian churches.
- When single members seek a marriage partner, they are expected to do that within the denomination so that they will be equally yoked. Faith marriage is practiced (seeking the Lord's direction regarding a spouse). Dating is discouraged.
- When there was a Selective Service draft, church members, and sometimes friends (Nonmembers who attend regularly. Many have made a commitment to Christ, but not to church membership), served in a non-combatant status in the military.
- The taking and swearing of an oath is strongly discouraged. An affirmation may be used as an alternative in legal, and other matters.
- Almost all congregations practice separated seating for men and women, though this may be relaxed from time to time for special occasions.
- Formal business attire is typical during worship services. Men wear suits and ties to church. Women wear dresses or skirts and are encouraged to be modestly dressed. The use of cosmetics is discouraged.
- Different congregations typically exchange "greetings" between each other and their members, either in person or at-large after the worship service when church announcements are shared to the congregation.
- Many church members traditionally use Early Modern English (including the familiar second-person forms "thee" and "thou" instead of "you") when praying.
- Some historical teachings and practices of the Apostolic Christian Church of America have been modified (at least at the denominational level) by its central leadership in recent years, including:
  - Change in teaching regarding sins unto death, which was related to a church split with the Faith Church (AFC) (2013)
  - Change in practice regarding restoration of certain excommunicated members (2014)
  - Spiritual outreach efforts through Apostolic Christian Mission Committee and humanitarian outreach done under Apostolic Christian World Relief were combined to provide more holistic, gospel-focused outreach under the new name of Apostolic Christian HarvestCall. (2016)
  - Permission of the online distribution of brotherhood conference recordings (2016)
  - Removal of expectation that men be clean-shaven (2018)
  - Recommendation of tolerance of the use of wedding rings by members (2018)
  - Change in certain roles of women in the church resulting in, among other things, unordained women teaching in formats other than a formal worship service (2019-2021)
  - Creation of new hymnal called Hymns Of Worship which includes both classic and contemporary styles of music and introduction to sanctuary worship (2022)
  - Reorganization and revisions to Statement of Faith (announced 2022)
  - Supplementation of KJV pulpit Bible with other versions (ESV, NIV) (2026-2027)

=== Church discipline ===
If a member commits a major sin, as the Apostolic Christian Church believes to be laid out by the Bible, he or she will be disciplined. The member is encouraged to go through a time of reflection and if they repent they may come back into fellowship. If there is no repentance, the individual will no longer be considered a member of the ACCA.

=== Conversion ===
The conversion experienced for each member varies in timing and detail, but all include repentance for one's sins, making restitution, confessing their sin to God and to people they've sinned against, and finding peace with God and man. The word "convert" is used throughout the denomination to describe anyone who begins repentance but has not yet been baptized into the church. It does not imply conversion from another denomination or religion, but from the carnal to the spiritual state. Once converts feel they have peace with God, this is announced to the church and a baptism date is set. Converts give a testimony before the members of the church prior to the public baptism service, telling the story of their personal conversion experience. This sharing, commonly referred to as a "testimony" or "proving", typically takes place the night before the baptism and is a closed member meeting. Because baptism is identified with a "death to sin" in Romans 6 and other New Testament writings, congregational recognition of the convert's repentance and death to sin is desired prior to baptism. The baptism service is open for anyone to attend and is performed before the entire congregation. Immediately before the baptism takes place the convert makes a covenant with God in the presence of the entire congregation to be faithful until death. Once the covenant is made, the convert is fully immersed in water (unless they are physically unable to do so) representing their sins being washed away by the blood of Christ and rising to a new creature in Christ. After the baptism service, there is a laying on of hands by one or more elders and an accompanying consecration prayer to dedicate the new brother or sister to God's work and to place the seal of the Holy Spirit on their life.

=== Marriage tradition ===
- The Apostolic Christian Church marriage tradition heavily involves the church.
- The marriage process for members of the ACCA begins when a member, typically a male, feels that God has led them to consider marriage. He or she then enters into a time of prayer and seeking God's will for whom they should marry, taking into account relationships and their individual feelings. They might also seek counsel from those they trust.
- They believe that God guides them and as he/she feels peaceful about a specific person, they go to their Elder. After prayer and consideration, the Elder then informs the intended member of the proposal. (If they are from another congregation, the sender's Elder informs the Elder of the recipient's congregation, who then tells them of the proposal.) The recipient then gives the proposal prayer and consideration.
- When the recipient feels peace given by God, they relay the answer to their elder, who relays it to the sender. If the answer is "No", nothing more becomes of the matter and it remains confidential. If the answer is "Yes", the couple is announced shortly thereafter in church announcements.
- Marriage is encouraged to take place soon (typically within four months) after it is announced. The engaged couple are discouraged from doing anything that might hinder their ability to remain pure until the wedding.
- The marriage ceremony takes the place of a Sunday afternoon service, with a reception following.

== Leadership ==
=== Elders ===
- The leaders of the church, including elders, deacons and ministers, are all male.
- Elders of local congregations are ordained by the Elders of the other congregations, usually after a ballot is taken from the local congregation. Elders are usually selected from the current ministers serving in the local church. Elders perform both religious rites and also conduct ministerial duties.
- Congregations who do not have a locally residing elder are assigned a "Counseling Elder" by the national elder body. Day-to-day business in these congregations is handled by a Deacon or "Lead Minister", depending on the specific situation of each congregation.
- The Elders of each congregation serve as equal members within the collective "Elder Body" of all elders who make decisions regarding the doctrine of the denomination.

=== Deacons and ministers ===
- Ministers' duties include preaching in their home congregations and in other congregations.
- Ministers (including elders and deacons) do not pursue seminary or other education in preparation for the ministry and serve without compensation.
- A Minister who is ordained as a deacon may assist the local or counseling elder with meeting with new converts, performing baptisms, and other duties usually carried out by the elder. The ordained deacon only carries out these duties in his home congregation. Most congregations do not have a deacon, rather they are ordained mostly in larger congregations where the elder needs assistance or in smaller congregations where there is no local elder.

=== Selection of elders, deacons, and ministers ===
- As a need arises, whether through retirement of a current elder, minister or deacon or through congregational growth, a committee of elders is convened to oversee the selection.
- Although it is not a set rule, the typical progression is from Minister to Deacon (if applicable) then to Elder.
- After prayer and consideration, the committee addresses the membership of the local congregation in a closed member meeting. The entire congregation will be asked to give the issue prayer and consideration.
- After a time of prayer and consideration, the membership of the local congregation will be given opportunity to turn in the name of the person they feel should be given the responsibility in question. If two or three names capture a sizable number of the votes, the elder committee may choose to ask the membership cast ballots again within the confines of those choices.
- If no clear choice emerges, the elder committee may choose to table the issue for a time. However, balloting is for advisory purposes only, ballots are destroyed promptly after they are counted and the elder committee has the final responsibility for the appointment.
- After a candidate for elder or ordained deacon is selected, he must be interviewed by the elder body at a church conference, typically held semi-annually in February and August.
- Upon confirmation, Ministers may assume their role after a time of prayer and meditation. Elders, Deacons, and Ministers have their authorities given to them in a special Ordination Ceremony held in their home congregations.

== Locations ==
Spread throughout the world, churches can be found in several countries.

- United States of America, Canada, Mexico, and Japan.
- Related congregations (not under the same denominational governance) in Germany, Hungary, Romania, and Ukraine.

Along with missionary work, the church also operates several nursing homes, schools, charities and orphanages.
