= Maldonado, Uruguay =

Capital city of Maldonado Department, Uruguay

Maldonado
- Capital city
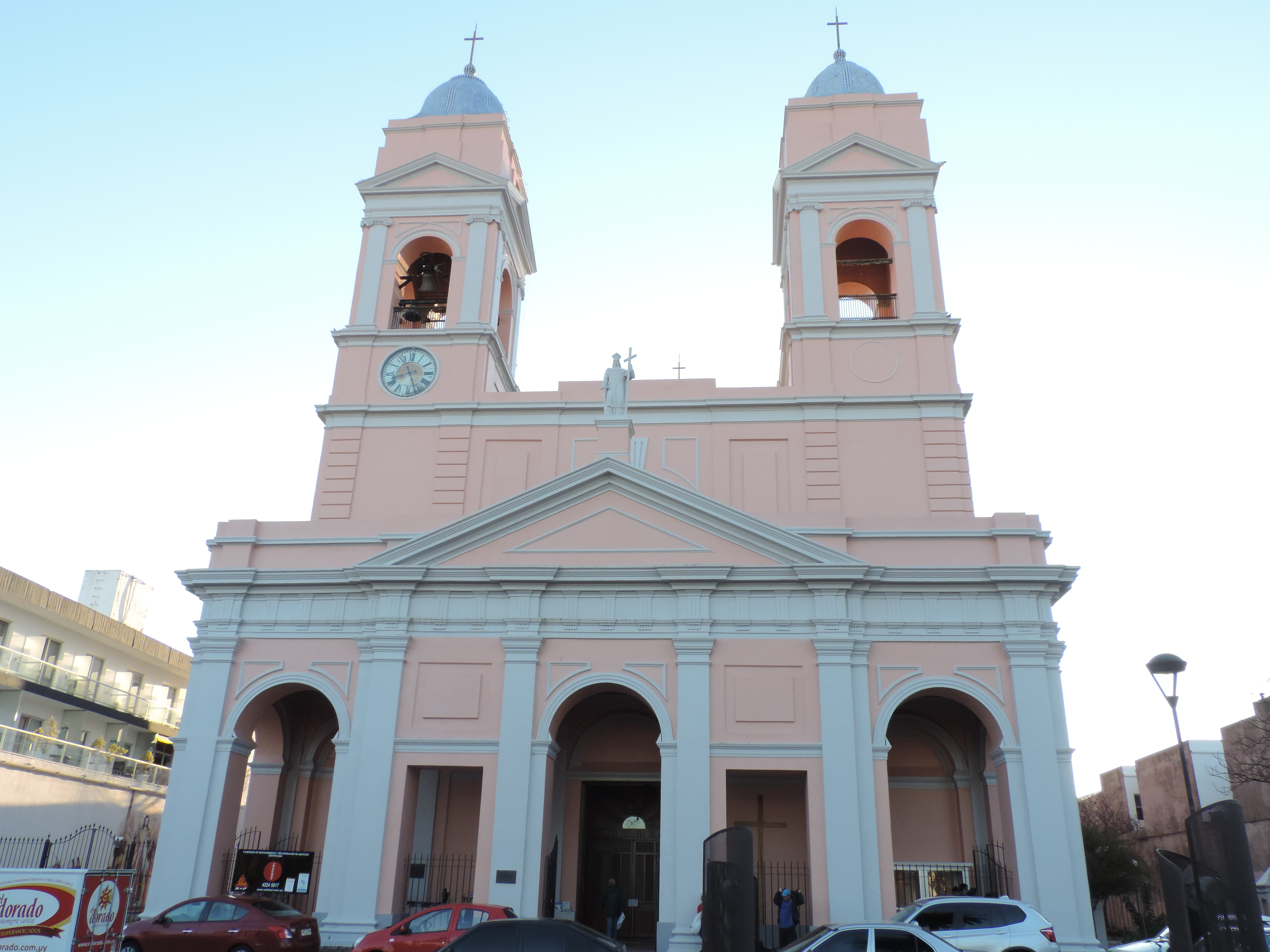
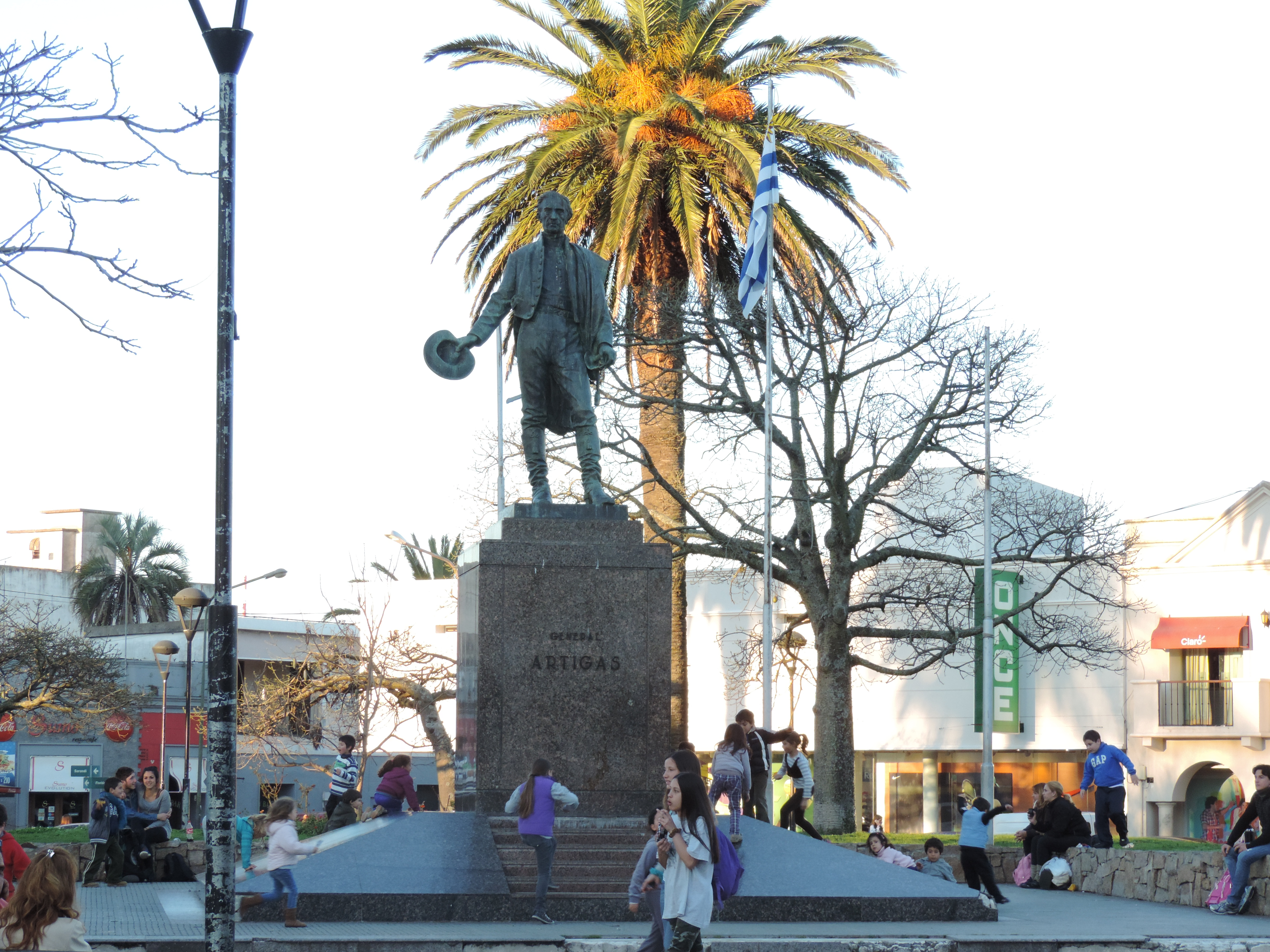
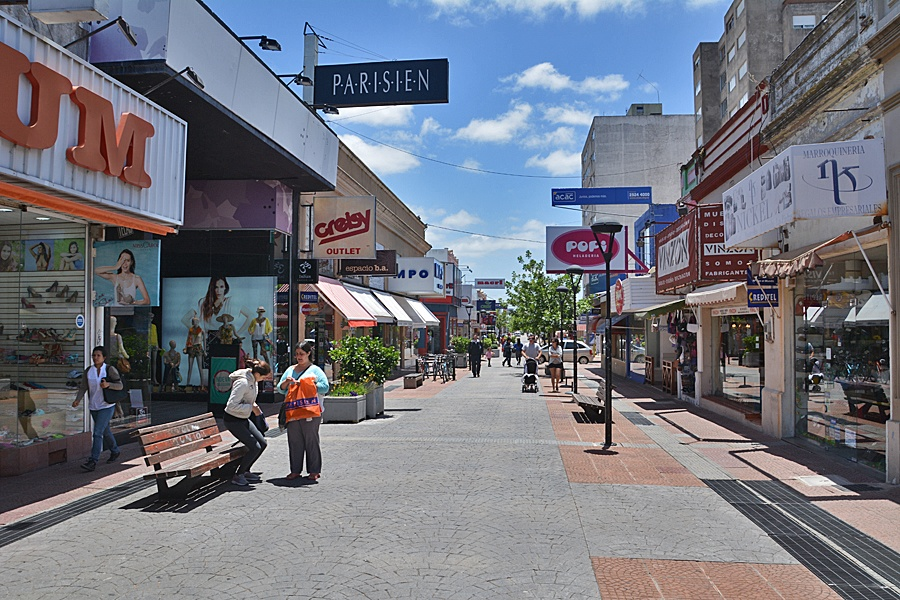
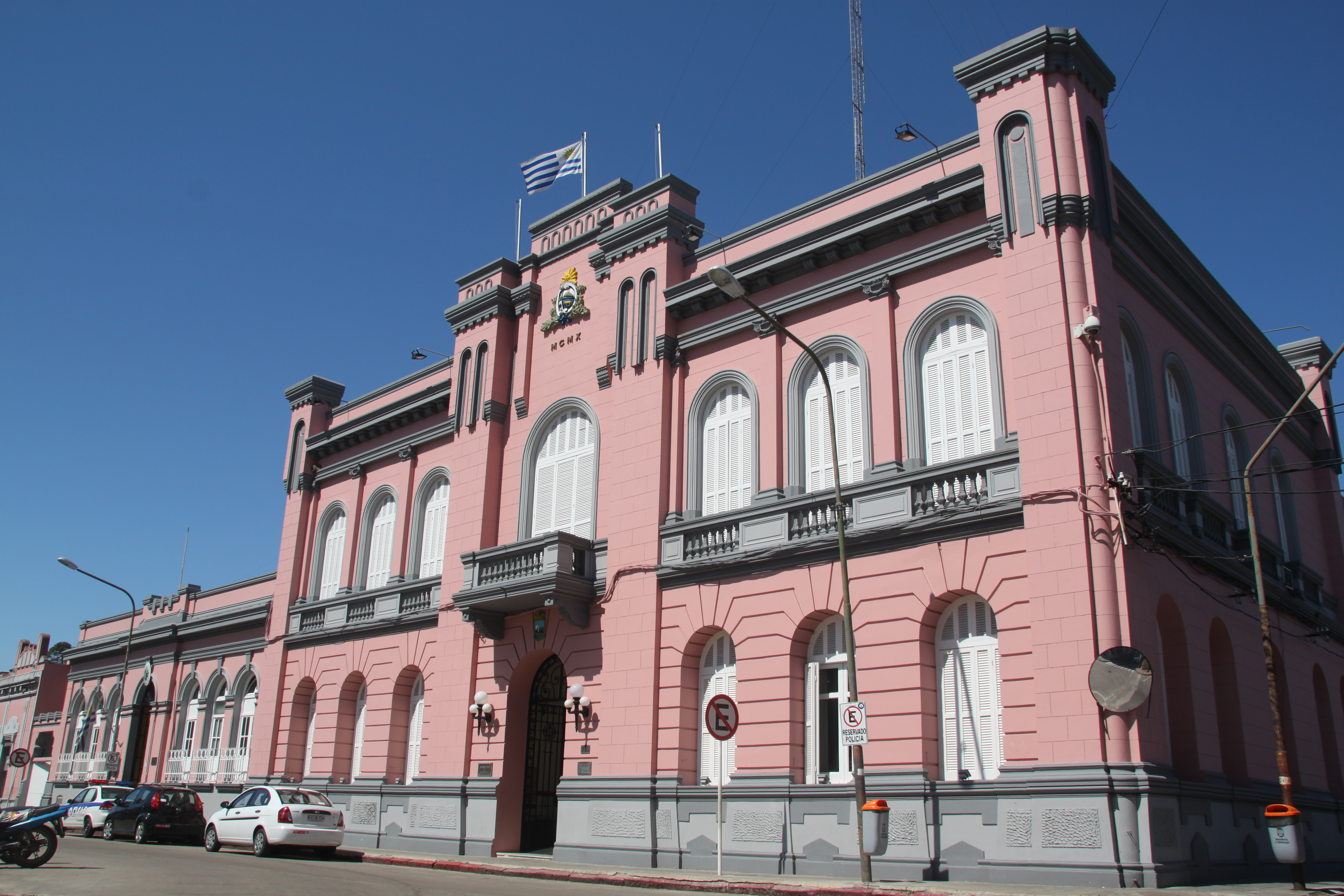
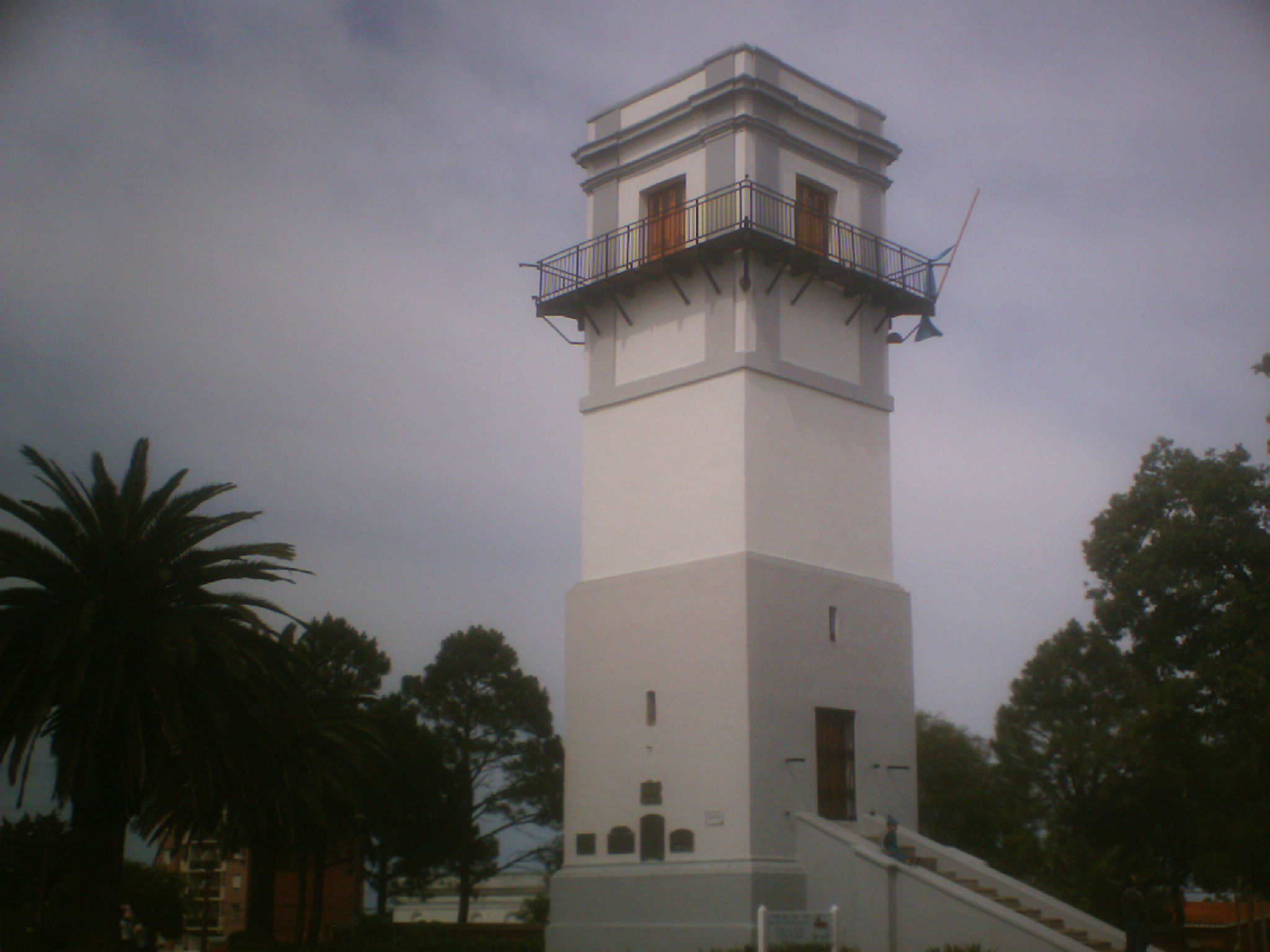
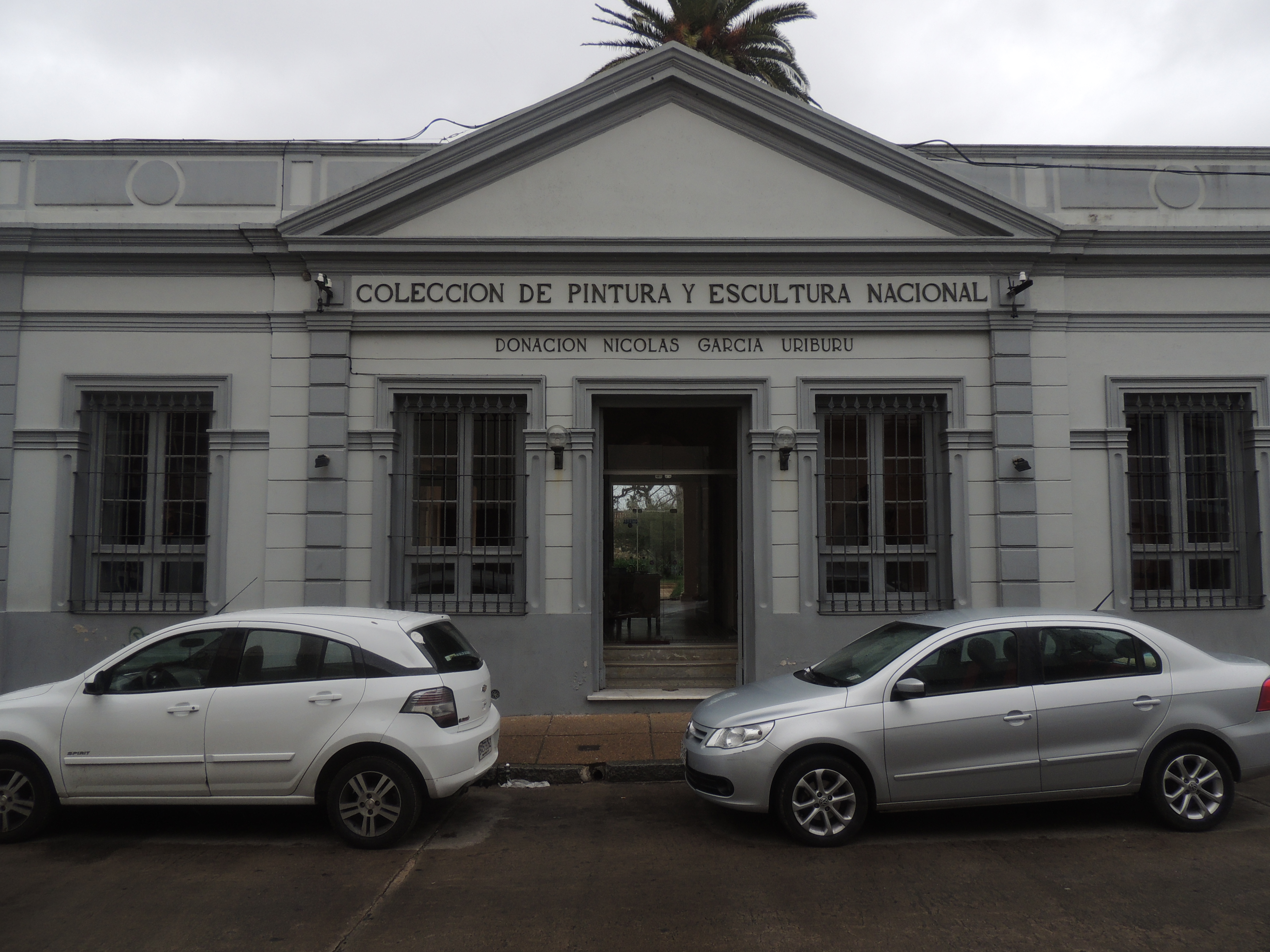
- From top, left to right: view of the Cathedral, the Artigas Monument in San Fernando Square, Downtown Maldonado, the Police Headquarters, the Torre del Vigía and the Nicolás García Uriburu Museum

- Flag

- Location in Uruguay
- Coordinates: 34°54′0″S 54°57′0″W
- Country: Uruguay
- Department: Maldonado
- Founded: 1755
- Founder: Joaquín de Viana

Government
  - Mayor (Alcalde): Dina Fernández Chaves (PN)

Area
  - Capital city: 59.8 km^{2} (23.1 sq mi)
- Elevation: 24 m (79 ft)

Population (2023 Census)
  - Capital city: 102,000
  - Density: 1,710/km^{2} (4,420/sq mi)
  - Urban: 135,014
  - Metro: 173,000
  - Demonym: Fernandino
- Time zone: UTC -3
- Postal code: 20000
- Dial plan: +598 42 (+6 digits)
- Climate: Cfb

Maldonado (Spanish pronunciation: [maldoˈnaðo]) is the capital city of Maldonado Department, in eastern Uruguay. According to the 2023 Census, it is the fourth most populated city in the country, with about 102 thousand inhabitants. However, together with the cities of Punta del Este and San Carlos it makes up a conurbation with a population of over 135 thousand inhabitants.

== History ==
The origin of Maldonado's name dates back to January 1530, when Sebastian Cabot, an Italian explorer, departed for Castilla and left his Lieutenant, Francisco Maldonado, at what became the bay of Maldonado. After the Treaty of Madrid, when they started to divide Spanish and Portuguese properties in that region of America, the military governor of Montevideo, José Joaquín de Viana, suggested to the King that they should establish two populations, one in Maldonado and the other in Minas. In August 1755, still waiting for a response from the King, Viana decided to leave with some families and head towards Portezuelo. It was there that Maldonado was founded. Viana later left the settlement, leaving the inhabitants with animals and sufficient supplies to live. The population survived and grew due to the profits from growing crops and raising livestock. When he returned 20 months later, he brought seven indigenous families and incorporated them into the small village to bolster the population. He also moved the settlement to its modern site.

The buildings that are built around the town square in Maldonado, including the cathedral, are reminiscent of traditional Spanish style, giving evidence that the Spanish royalty was involved in the growth and development of Maldonado. In May 1783, the population had grown and the villagers gave Don Luis Estremera the power to oversee the creation of a city council, thus legally establishing the city 25 years after Viana had founded it. After years of attempts, on March 14, 1787, an election was held and approved 8 days later, and the City Council of Maldonado was elected and the Town of Maldonado became the City of San Fernando De Maldonado in honor of Ferdinand VI of Spain. With a City Council established, the people of Maldonado could defend their rights as citizens.

== Geography ==
It is located on Route 39 and shares borders with Punta del Este to the south, Pinares – Las Delicias to the south and to the east, and suburb La Sonrisa to the north. Together they all form a unified metropolitan area. The next city to the north is San Carlos, only 13 kilometres (8.1 mi) away on Route 39.

East of the city flows the stream Arroyo Maldonado.

Climate

Maldonado has an oceanic climate (Köppen: Cfb) with mild winters and without snow. The summers are warm (recently hot occasionally), similar to southeastern Australia. By being in the way of the Falkland Current and in the bottleneck of the continent it generates a rare temperate climate typically of the ocean on the east coast. But the city is close to a humid subtropical climate (Cfa), consolidating in the coming decades.

== Population ==
In 2023 the city of Maldonado had a population of 102,000. According to the Intendencia Departamnetal de Maldonado, the municipality of Maldonado has a population of 105,000.

Location map of the municipality of Maldonado

Year	Population
1908	4,431
1963	15,005
1975	22,762
1985	33,535
1996	48,936
2004	54,603
2011	62,590
2023	102,000

Source: National Statistics Institute

== Main sights ==
Remarkable sights in Maldonado include:

- San Fernando de Maldonado Cathedral, a neoclassic cathedral begun in 1801 and completed in 1895
- Cuartel de Dragones (The Dragoons' Barracks), a Spanish garrison begun in 1771 and completed in 1797
- Torre del Vigia (meaning "tower of vigilance" or, more simply, "watchtower"), built-in 1800 under the direction of Rafael Pérez del Puerto; its function was to inform the authorities of the entrance into Buenos Aires or the approach of any ship to the Río de la Plata
- El Puente de la Barra, a stressed ribbon bridge, where the roadbed swoops up, down, and back up and down once more, demonstrating an exceptional economy of material
- Casapueblo hotel

== Places of worship ==
- Cathedral of St. Ferdinand (Roman Catholic)
- Church of Our Lady of the Remedies (Roman Catholic)
- Church of Our Lady of the Thirty-Three (Roman Catholic)

== Notable residents ==
- Alberto Abdala (1920–1986), Vice President of Uruguay from 1967 to 1972
- Johnny Aquino (born 1978), association football midfielder for Sarmiento de Junín
- Maite Cáceres (born 2002), racing driver
- Martín Campaña (born 1989), goalkeeper for Cerro Largo FC
- Fernando Clavijo (1956–2019), footballer and manager who represented the United States national team and national futsal team

== See also ==
- Maldonado Department Main Urban Centres
