= Szentpéterúr =

Coordinates: 46°46′N 17°02′E

- Village
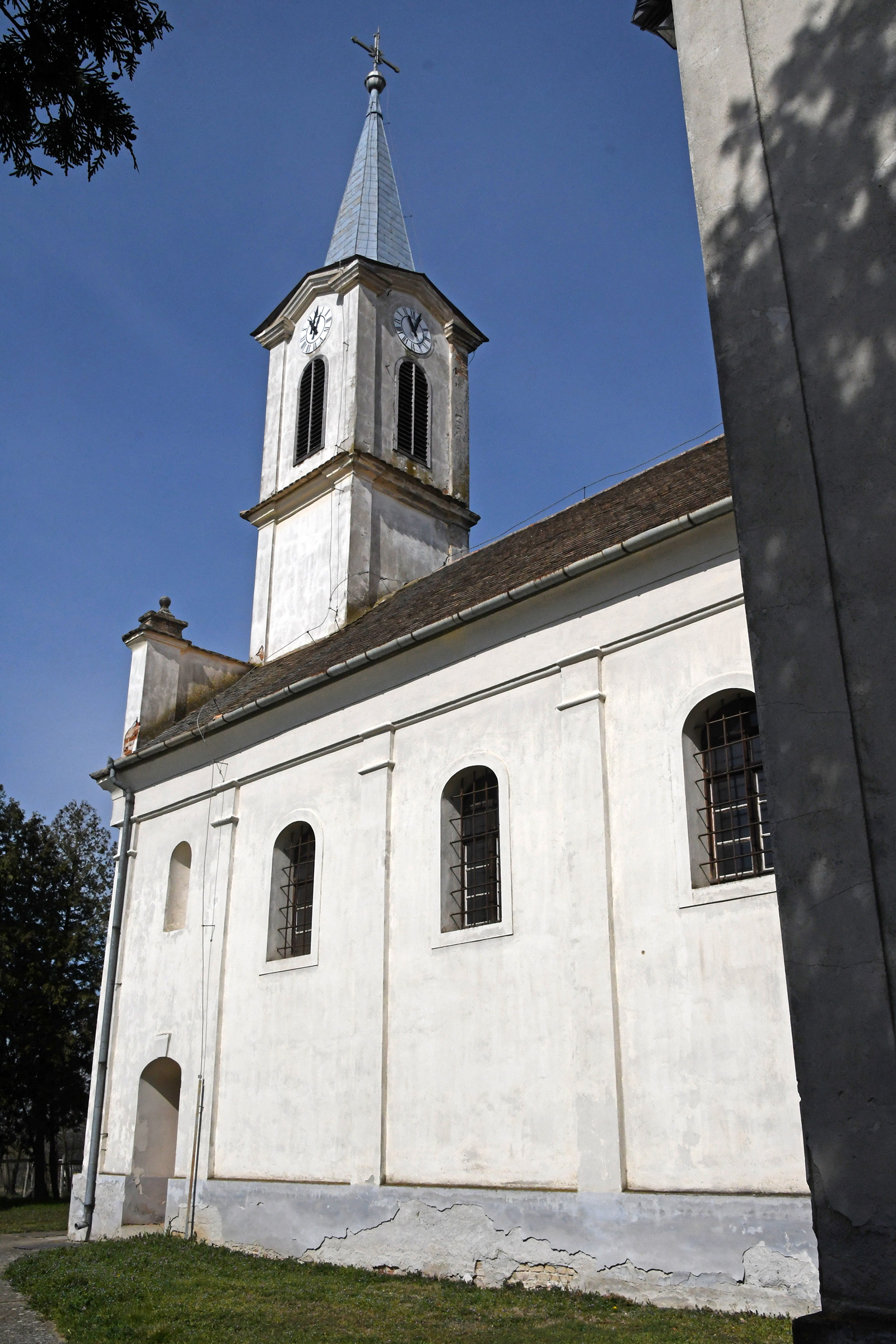
- Szentpétertúri katolikus templom
- Interactive map of Szentpéterúr
- Country: Hungary
- Region: Western Transdanubia
- County: Zala County
- Time zone: UTC+1 (CET)
  - Summer (DST): UTC+2 (CEST)

Szentpéterúr is a village in Zala County, Hungary.
