= Samuel Heinrich Fröhlich =

Swiss Anabaptist evangelist (1803–1857)

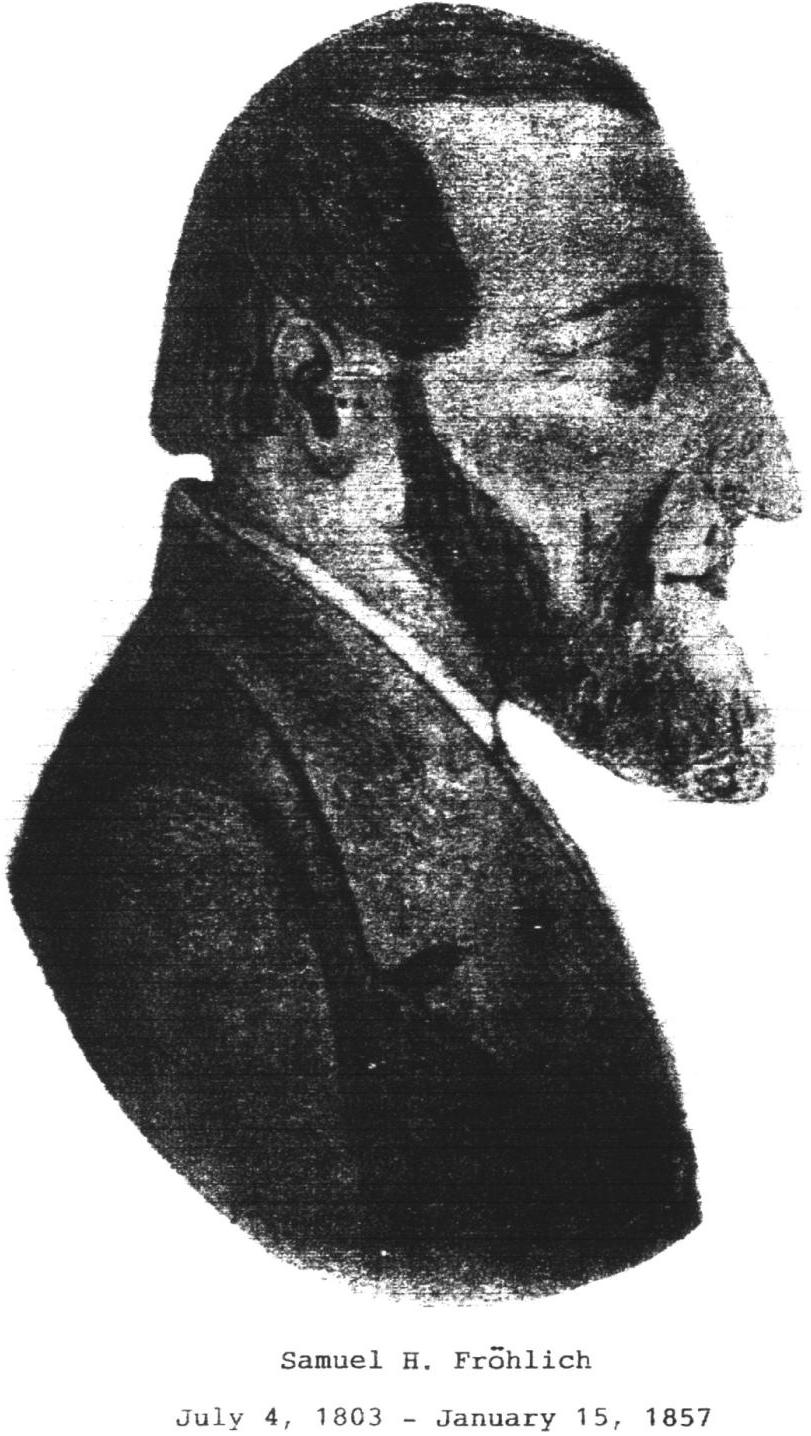
- The only surviving image of Froehlich.
- Born: Samuel Heinrich Fröhlich; July 4, 1803; Brugg, Canton of Aargau, Switzerland
- Died: January 15, 1857 (aged 53); Strasbourg, France
- Resting place: St. Helena Cemetery, Strasbourg
- Education: University of Basel, University of Zürich
- Occupations: Anabaptist evangelist, religious leader
- Spouse: Susette Brunschwiler (m. 1836)

Samuel Heinrich Fröhlich (Swiss Standard German: [ˈfrøːlɪç]; July 4, 1803 – January 15, 1857) was a Swiss Anabaptist evangelist, theologian, and the founder of the Evangelical Baptist Church, known as Neutäufer (New Anabaptists) in Switzerland and the Apostolic Christian Church in North America. His work contributed to the development of Anabaptist thought in the 19th century and influenced subsequent religious movements.

Born in Brugg, Canton of Aargau, to a family of French Calvinist Huguenot descent, Fröhlich was raised with a strong religious foundation. Initially aligned with the rationalist theology of his time, he experienced a profound spiritual conversion that led him to reject liberal theology and embrace Anabaptist principles such as believer's baptism and the separation of church and state.

His preaching and establishment of new congregations made him a notable figure in the revivalist movement within Europe. Despite facing opposition from the state church and enduring personal hardships, Fröhlich's influence reached across Europe and into North America, and the principles he advocated continue to be part of the Apostolic Christian Church's identity.

== Biography ==
=== Early life ===
Samuel Heinrich Fröhlich was born on July 4, 1803, in Brugg, Canton of Aargau, Switzerland, to a family of devout French Calvinist Huguenot descent. Originally bearing the surname De Joyeux, the family fled to Switzerland following the revocation of the Edict of Nantes in 1685. They later adopted the surname 'Fröhlich,' which means 'joyful.'

Fröhlich's father, Samuel, was a tanner and church sexton, while his mother, Gottliebin (née Berger), came from a religious background. Fröhlich was also related to Abraham Emanuel and Friedrich Theodor.

Religion was central to Fröhlich's upbringing, and his parents guided him toward a life in ministry, a path he accepted without question, viewing it as a profession to be learned.

=== Education ===
Fröhlich was prepared from an early age for ordained ministry in the State Reformed Church of Switzerland. He attended prestigious institutions, including the Collegium Humanitatis and Gymnasium Carolinum in Zürich, where he was trained in classical languages and philology.

In 1823, at age twenty, Fröhlich began formal theological studies at the University of Basel, studying under the rationalist theologian and Bible scholar Wilhelm Martin Leberecht de Wette. During his education, Fröhlich was exposed to historical Biblical criticism, which was at the forefront of German and Swiss universities at the time.

Fröhlich, influenced by the rationalist theology of his Zürich and Basel mentors, rejected his parents' beliefs in what he considered superstitions such as “Hell” and “the Devil.”

He found his studies mechanical and uninspired, likening them to preparation for a professional trade rather than a calling. Concerned, his parents sought the guidance of a Pietist student chaplain at Basel, who introduced him to a Moravian Pietist student conventicle. Initially resistant to their emphasis on self-knowledge and repentance, Fröhlich experienced a profound conversion, marked by a conviction to change his life.

Influenced by the Moravian Brethren and the writings of François Fénelon, he joined the revival movement in 1826.

Between May 1826 and Fall 1826, Fröhlich began the examinations for the ministry in the Reformed state church of Switzerland. He failed these examinations, delaying his entry into the ministry by one year, and also suffered from respiratory ailments. He returned for his oral examination in May 1827 and was subsequently ordained to the ministry.

=== Religious career ===
Fröhlich moved away from rationalist and liberal theological perspectives, adopting a gospel that emphasized repentance, the New Birth, faith in Christ’s atoning sacrifice, and a life of godliness, which aligned with the German and French Awakening movements.

Fröhlich was confirmed for ministry in the Protestant state church on May 27, 1827. Initially serving as a parish administrator, he later became a vicar in Leutwil, Canton of Aargau. In December 1828, he took over a parish in Leutwil, known for its depravity. His evangelical message led to a notable response from the large congregation of 1,800, drawing widespread attention.

His fervent preaching style, which emphasized spiritual renewal and a return to biblical principles, led to numerous spiritual revivals. However, his growing popularity also caused conflict with the State Church Consistory, who viewed his methods as disruptive to the established order.

In September 1830, Fröhlich was dismissed from his ministry and prohibited from preaching or performing sacraments due to his refusal to accept the newly established rationalist confession of faith that replaced the traditional Heidelberg Catechism.

=== Break with the reformed church ===
The turning point in Fröhlich's career came in 1830 when he vehemently opposed the introduction of a new catechism in the Reformed Church. He believed this catechism reflected a naturalistic or rationalistic religion that deviated from true biblical teachings. His opposition led to his removal from his position by the church council on October 22, 1830. Subsequently, he was forbidden from performing any churchly functions and was removed from the list of Aargau clergy on June 4, 1831.

Following his dismissal, Fröhlich underwent a period of intense spiritual searching. This culminated in his embrace of Anabaptist teachings, including believers' baptism, separation of church and state, and nonviolence. In a significant act of spiritual renewal, he was re-baptized as an adult in February 1832 by a missionary of the Continental Society of London.

=== Founding of the evangelical baptist church ===
Emboldened by his new convictions, Fröhlich embarked on extensive missionary journeys throughout Switzerland. His teachings found particular resonance among some Mennonites, especially in the Emmental region. Through his preaching and private meetings, he established new congregations that would form the basis of the Evangelical Baptist Church.

== Theological views and influences ==
=== Separation of church and state ===
A fundamental aspect of Fröhlich's theology was his strong advocacy for the separation of church and state. This view was partly shaped by his exclusionary experiences with the state church system in Switzerland. His stance led to significant conflicts with state church authorities, culminating in his expulsion from Zürich in 1843. This separation principle also influenced his approach to church organization and governance, favoring independent congregations over state-sanctioned religious institutions.

=== Theological anthropology ===
His theological anthropology focuses on the nature of human beings, particularly the relationship between body, soul, and spirit. He views humans as composed of these three distinct elements, with the soul acting as the bridge between the body (physical aspect) and the spirit (spiritual aspect). Froehlich emphasizes that the human spirit is what connects individuals to God, while the body ties them to the physical world. Sin, in his view, affects this balance, leading to spiritual death if not addressed through faith and redemption. His perspective aligns with Anabaptist beliefs, highlighting the importance of spiritual regeneration and the pursuit of a pure, Christ-centered life.

=== Doctrine of sin ===
Froehlich distinguishes between "original sin," which is the sinful nature inherited from Adam, and the personal sins that individuals commit. Froehlich believes that while all humans inherit a tendency to sin from Adam, they are not guilty of Adam's specific sin. Instead, guilt is only attributed to the sins individuals commit themselves after they reach an age of understanding and accountability.

Froehlich also categorizes sins into different levels of severity. He identifies "sins unto death," such as murder and adultery, as particularly serious offenses that were punishable by death under Old Testament law. These sins are considered more severe compared to other, lesser sins. This categorization reflects his interpretation of scriptural teachings on sin and its consequences.

Importantly, Froehlich rejects the idea that children are born guilty of sin. While he acknowledges that children inherit a sinful nature from Adam, he asserts that they are not personally guilty until they are old enough to understand and commit sins themselves. This contrasts with some other Christian teachings that suggest children inherit both a sinful nature and guilt.

Froehlich also emphasizes the role of the law in helping individuals recognize their sinfulness. He believes that through the law, people become aware of their sinful nature and their need for redemption, which leads them to seek forgiveness and atonement through Christ. Overall, Froehlich's doctrine of sin highlights personal responsibility, the innocence of children regarding original sin, and the importance of recognizing sin through the guidance of the law.

=== Soteriology ===
==== Baptism ====
Froehlich's views on baptism focused on whether it should be by immersion or sprinkling. Historically, Mennonite practices varied, with early Anabaptists using sprinkling and immersion. By the Reformation, pouring became more common, but immersion was revived later among Mennonites, including the Neutäufer. The Brethren claimed to have influenced Froehlich to adopt immersion, specifically trine immersion (three dips). Froehlich himself preferred immersion but was initially baptized by sprinkling. His followers, the Neutäufer, supported immersion, causing a split in the Mennonite Church. However, it’s unclear if the Brethren's influence came before or after the Neutäufer’s adoption of immersion.

Frohlich opposed infant baptism, arguing that it contradicts the Anabaptist emphasis on personal conversion and faith. He believed that baptism should follow a personal transformation and that infants, lacking the capacity for faith, cannot meet the requirements for baptism. Frohlich interpreted Matthew 28:19-20 as indicating that baptism should come after an individual has demonstrated faith. He also compared infant baptism unfavorably with John’s baptism, which required repentance and personal preparation. Frohlich critiqued supporters of infant baptism for misunderstanding its role, asserting that it should be a conscious act of faith rather than a ritual performed on those unable to make a personal decision.

==== Nonresistance ====
Fröhlich adopted the Mennonite teaching on nonresistance, which became a key aspect of his doctrine. This principle was not originally part of Fröhlich's theology, but was incorporated after his interactions with Mennonite congregations in Switzerland in the early 1830s. Specifically, "He accepted their teaching on nonresistance". Fröhlich's faith statement lacked provisions on military service, prompting the adoption of nonresistance as a formal doctrine. This stance led to severe persecution of Nazarene conscientious objectors, particularly in Hungary and Yugoslavia, where they faced imprisonment and harsh treatment. Despite this, the commitment to nonresistance and pacifism remains a fundamental aspect of Fröhlich's legacy, continuing to shape Nazarene beliefs and practices.

=== Doctrine of God ===
He held a dualistic worldview where two opposing kingdoms exist: God's Kingdom and Satan's Kingdom. Fröhlich's theology was influenced by his reaction against rationalist theology and his subsequent alignment with the Pietist movements, which stressed personal repentance and holiness.

Fröhlich's view of God is heavily centered on holiness and the absolute necessity of a sanctified life. He argued that salvation was not just about individual justification but involved a cosmic struggle between these two kingdoms. His doctrine suggests that being part of God's Kingdom requires complete separation from the world's corrupt systems, often represented metaphorically as "Babylon" or the "State Church."

Fröhlich's theology was radical in its implications for Christian living, insisting on a complete transformation of the believer through the power of the Holy Spirit, which he linked closely with the rite of baptism. This transformation was so thorough that he believed it erased the marks of original sin, leading to a state where the believer could live without sin, a concept resembling the "Christian Perfectionism" found in some Anglo-American holiness traditions.

Fröhlich's doctrine of God also highlighted the importance of enduring persecution and suffering as part of the Christian experience, reflecting a strong martyr identity within his movement. This identity was central to his followers' sense of being a remnant of true believers set apart from the broader, corrupt Christian world.

== Neutäufer movement ==
The Neutäufer (New Anabaptist) movement was a significant part of his religious life and work. After being influenced by the revival movement in the early 1820s, particularly the Moravian Brethren and the writings of François Fénelon, Fröhlich became increasingly disillusioned with the state church.

In 1832, after his baptism by Ami Bost, Fröhlich began organizing former church members into a new religious community that would later be known as the Neutäufer. This movement focused on the principles of believer's baptism, a rigorous moral code, and the rejection of state church practices, which Fröhlich saw as "antichristian."

Fröhlich's work in establishing and leading the Neutäufer congregations was extensive. He founded numerous communities in Switzerland, particularly in German-speaking regions, and later in Alsace and southern Germany. His influence also reached Hungary, where the Nazarenes joined the Neutäufer movement, and through emigration, the movement spread to the United States, where it became known as the Apostolic Christian Church.

The Neutäufer movement, under Fröhlich's leadership, emphasized spiritual renewal and strict adherence to biblical teachings, often in opposition to the established church. Fröhlich's efforts to create a distinct and devout community led to both his expulsion from various regions and the eventual growth of the movement across Europe and North America.

== Personal life and legacy ==
=== Personal life ===
Samuel Heinrich Fröhlich married Susette Brunschwiler in August 1836. Their marriage faced significant challenges due to their non-compliance with state-church regulations. For example, when they moved to Brugg, Fröhlich's hometown, the local church refused to grant Susette citizenship, making their marriage appear illegitimate.

This led to various hardships, including Fröhlich being separated from his wife during the birth of their first son in 1841, who died shortly after. The couple faced further persecution when Fröhlich was imprisoned following the birth of their second son in 1842. In 1844, they moved to Strasbourg, where their marriage was finally recognized in 1846 after a seven-year separation.

=== Legacy ===
His work synthesized evangelical renewalist impulses with traditional Anabaptist convictions, emphasizing personal conversion, believer's baptism, and a strict moral code. Fröhlich's movement grew significantly during the 19th century, spreading across Europe and to the United States, where it influenced the formation of numerous congregations.

Despite facing internal tensions and fragmentation, the principles Fröhlich established—such as non-resistance, separation from the world, and a strong community focus—remain central to the identity of the Apostolic Christian Church.

== Works ==
- Das Geheimnis der Gottseligkeit und das Geheimnis der Gottlosigkeit (1830)
  - Translated as “The Mystery of Godliness and the Mystery of Ungodliness—Their Natures and their Oppositions to Each Other Illuminated by the Word of God.”
- Die Erretung des Menschen durch das Bad der Wiedergeburt und die Erneuerung des heiligen Geistes (1838)
  - Translated as “The Salvation of Man through the Washing of New Birth and the Renewal of the Holy Spirit—A Scriptural Discussion Concerning Baptism in Christ.”
