= John Alexander Smith (disambiguation) =

John Alexander Smith (1863–1939) was a British idealist philosopher.

John Alexander Smith may also refer to:

- John Alexander Smith (curator) (c.1814–1889), British-New Zealand businessman, museum curator and councillor
- John Alexander Smith (physician) (1818–1883), Scottish physician, antiquarian, archaeologist and ornithologist
