= Auckland War Memorial Museum =

Museum in Auckland, New Zealand

- Tāmaki Paenga Hira (Note: Tāmaki Paenga Hira means Auckland's memorial to fallen chiefs and their gathered taonga. Tāmaki is Auckland, the net of Maki. Paenga is to ceremonially layout, heap together on a marae, a margin, a chiefly boundary, and a reference to those fallen in battle. Hira is numerous, abundant, important, of consequence, great.)
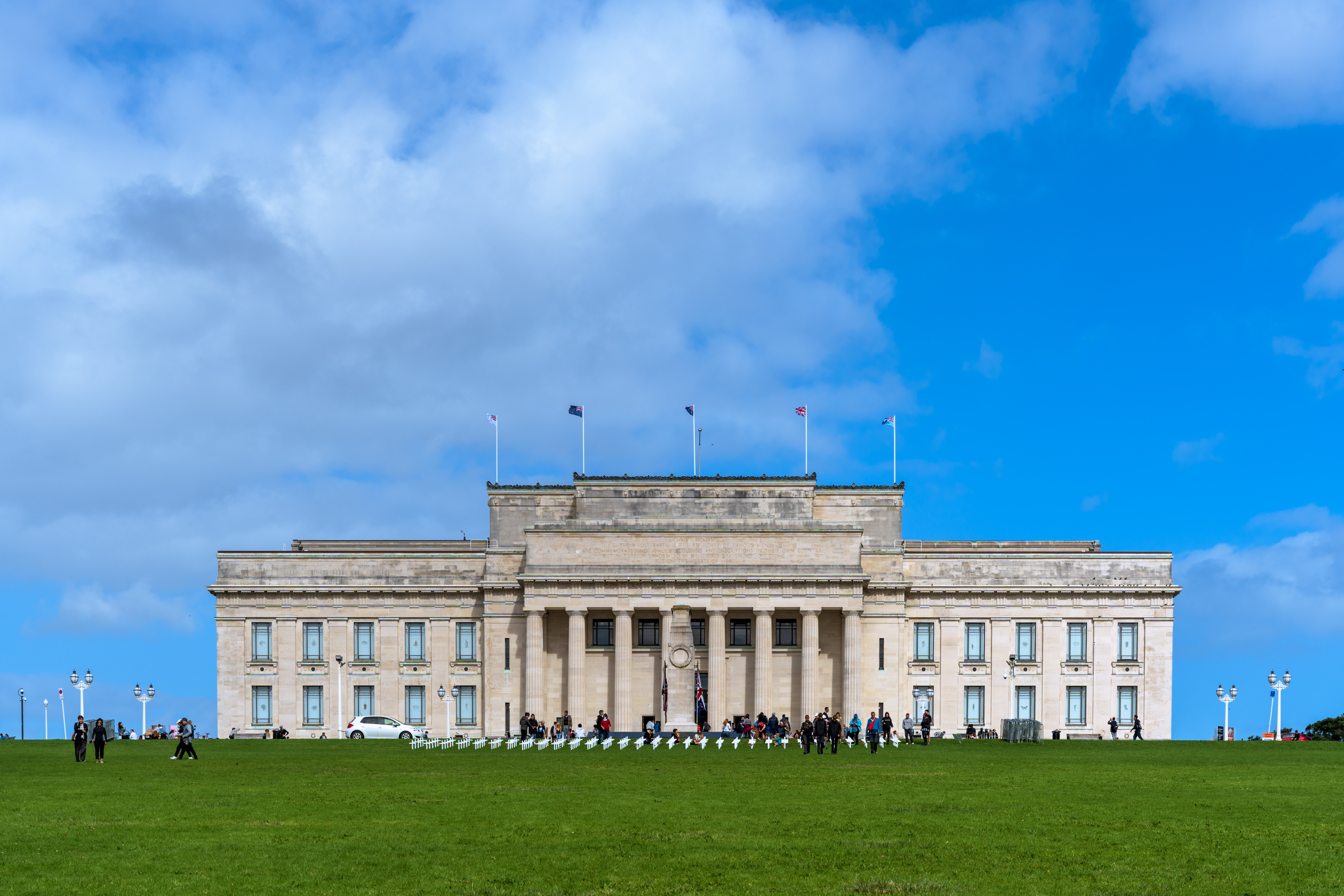
- Auckland War Memorial Museum
- Former name: Auckland Institute and Museum (1886–1996); Te Papa Whakahiku (1992–2003) (Note: This name was given by the Māori Language Commission Te Taura Whiri i te Reo Māori in 1992. Sir Hugh Kāwharu explained its meaning in his 2001 lecture, "Land and Identity in Tāmaki: a Ngāti Whātua Perspective": I feel I should explain at this point that Te Papa Whakahiku is not a literal translation of "Auckland War Memorial Museum". Te Papa refers to Papatuanuku, the earth mother, the place where all people will be ultimately buried (in this context, in war cemeteries here or abroad). Whakahiku means to bring together treasures, a repository, a museum. Hiku also means the tail of a fish. That is, in the North Island (Maui's legendary fish – Te Ika a Maui) the head is regarded as at Wellington while the tail is at Auckland and all lands to the north: hence "Te Papa Whakahiku".)
- Established: 25 October 1852; 174 years ago
- Coordinates: 36°51′37″S 174°46′40″E
- Type: Encyclopaedic / universal
- Key holdings: Hotunui (whare rūnanga); Te Toki a Tāpiri (waka taua); The Sir Edmund Hillary Archive; Tairua trolling lure
- Collection size: 4.5 million objects
- Visitors: 859,779 (FY 2016–17)
- Director: David Reeves
- Chairperson: Richard Bedford
- Architect: Grierson & Aimer

Heritage New Zealand – Category 1
- Designated: 6 June 1985
- Reference no.: 94

The Auckland War Memorial Museum (Māori: Tāmaki Paenga Hira), also known as Auckland Museum, is one of New Zealand's most important museums and war memorials. Its neoclassical building constructed in the 1920s and 1950s, stands on Observatory Hill, the remains of a dormant volcano, in the Auckland Domain, near Auckland CBD. Museum collections concentrate on New Zealand history (and especially the history of the Auckland Region), natural history, and military history.

Auckland Museum's collections and exhibits began in 1852. In 1867 Aucklanders formed a learned society—the Auckland Philosophical Society, soon renamed Auckland Institute. Within a few years Auckland Museum was transferred to Auckland Institute, thereafter known as Auckland Institute and Museum until 1996. Auckland War Memorial Museum was the name of the new building opened in 1929, but since 1996 it has been more commonly used for the institution as well. From 1991 to 2003 the Museum's Māori name was Te Papa Whakahiku.

== Early history ==
Auckland Museum, established in 1852, was originally housed in a small cottage in Grafton Road, referred to as "Old Government Farm House" or "The Governor's Dairy", near the corner with Symonds Street, an area now part of the University of Auckland.

The public were first admitted on Sunday 24 October 1852, and every Wednesday and Saturday thereafter. Honorary Secretary John Alexander Smith announced that the museum was now open to the public in the newspapers from 29 October that year:

THE object of this Museum is to collect Specimens illustrative of the Natural History of New Zealand—particularly its Geology, Mineralogy, Entomology, and Ornithology.

Also, Weapons, Clothing, Implements, &c., &c, of New Zealand, and the Islands of the Pacific. Any Memento of Captain Cook, or his Voyages will be thankfully accepted. Also, Coins and Medals (Ancient and Modern.) In connection with the above, there is an Industrial Museum, to exhibit—Specimens of:

- building & ornamental Stone,
- Timber for various purposes
- Clays, Sands, &c., &c.,
- Dyes—Tanning substances, &c,
- Gums, Resins, &c.,
- Flax, Hemp, Hair, &c., &c.

As it is desirable that samples of New Zealand Wool should be exhibited—contributors are requested to send samples in duplicate, as soon as convenient, stating—the Sheep, where bred—of what breed—also the age—who contributed by. Donors are requested to send their contributions directed to the Honorary Secretary, at the Museum, any day in the week, except those open to the public.—Stating—the name of the contributor—where from—who contributed by—date—and any remarks that are considered necessary.

J. A. Smith,
Hon. Sec.
Auckland, 25 October 1852

The museum attracted 708 visitors in its first year. Interest in the museum dwindled over the following decade even as its collection grew, and in 1869 the somewhat neglected and forlorn museum was transferred to the care of the Auckland Institute, a learned society formed two years earlier. An Italianate-style building was constructed for the museum in Princes Street, near Government House and across the road from the Northern Club. It was opened on 5 June 1876 by the Governor of New Zealand, George Phipps, 2nd Marquess of Normanby. These new premises included a large gallery top-lit by a metal framed skylight. This room proved problematic as it was impossible to heat during the winter but overheated during the summer. Canvas awnings used to shield the roof from harsh sunlight made the exhibits difficult to view in the resulting gloom. Several exhibition halls were added to the side of the original building.

One of the visitors during the 1890s was the French artist Gauguin, who sketched several Maori items and later incorporated them into his Tahitian period paintings.

== War Memorial building ==
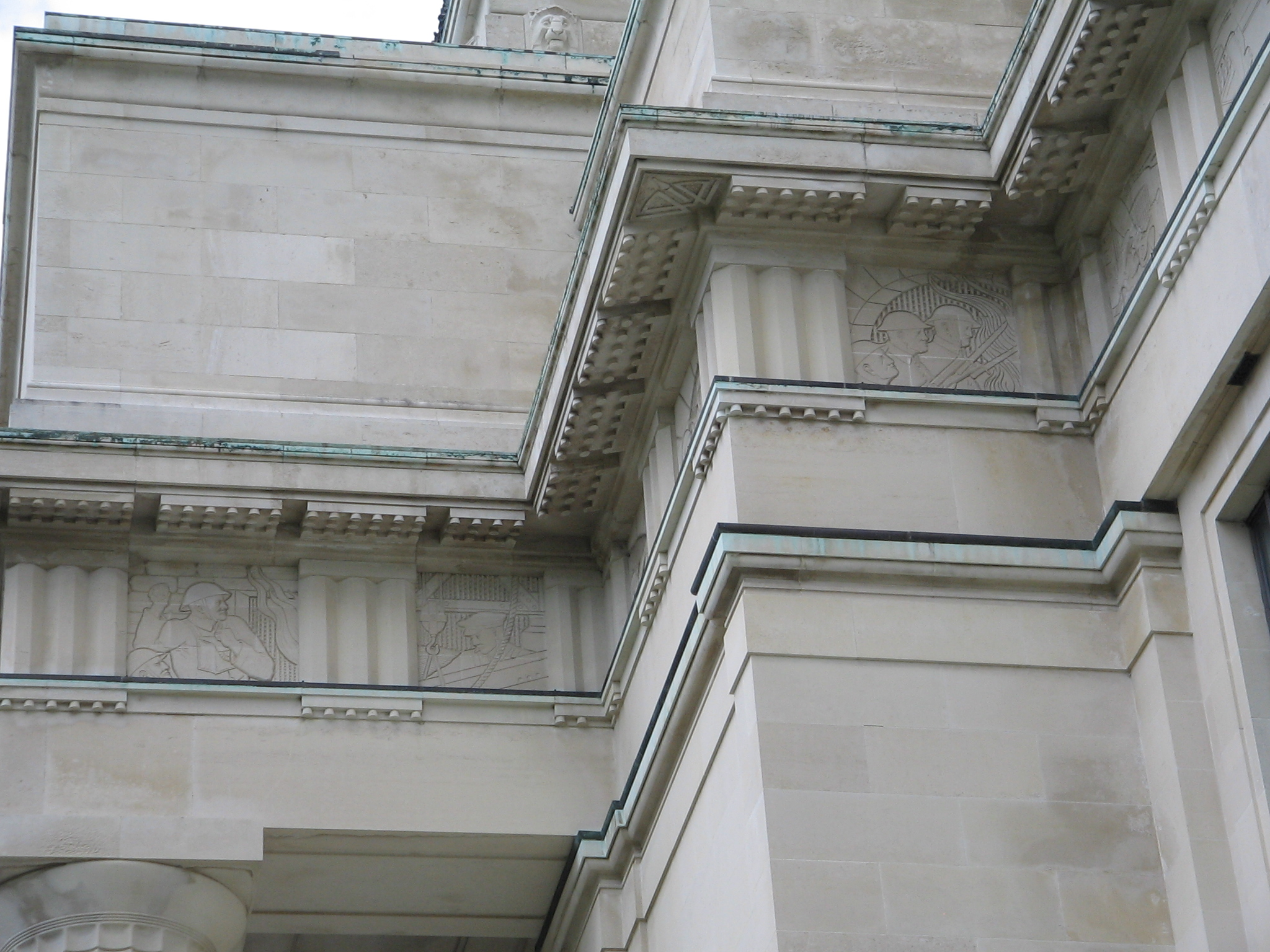
Part of the entablature on the museum's façade, depicting war scenes on its Doric frieze in an alternating pattern of metopes (decorated panels) and triglyphs (channelled stone)

In the early years of the 20th century the museum and its collections flourished under visionary curator Thomas Cheeseman, who tried to establish a sense of order and separated the natural history, classical sculpture and anthropological collections which had previously been displayed in a rather unsystematic way. The need for better display conditions and extra space necessitated a move from the Princes Street site, and eventually the project for a purpose-built museum was merged with the idea of creating a memorial to commemorate soldiers lost in the First World War.

After extensive consultation between the Mayor, Sir James Gunson and Thomas Cheeseman, the site chosen was a hill in the Government Domain commanding an impressive view of the Waitematā Harbour. Permission was granted by the Auckland City Council in 1918, with the Council in its liberality being given three seats on the Museum Council. In addition to an initial gift of £10,000 (equivalent to about £390,000 in 2025), the council also agreed to an annual subsidy from rates towards maintenance of the facility, and eventually coaxed several of the other local bodies to the principle of an annual statutory levy of £6,000 to support the museum's upkeep.

A worldwide architectural competition was funded by the Institute of British Architects, with a prize of £1,000 (equivalent to about £40,000 in 2025) sterling drawing more than 70 entries. The Auckland firm of Grierson, Aimer and Draffin won with their neo-classical design reminiscent of Greco-Roman temples. In 1920, the present site was settled on as a home for the museum, and in August 1925, after successful fund-raising led by Auckland Mayor Sir James Gunson, building of the Auckland War Memorial Museum began. Construction was completed in 1929, and the museum's new building was opened by the Governor-General, General Sir Charles Fergusson.

The museum's architects commissioned Kohn's Jewellers of Queen Street to create a finely detailed silver model of the museum. This was presented to Gunson upon completion of the museum, in recognition of his extensive work in leading the project. After the death of Sir James, the model was presented to the museum by his son Wallace Gunson, where it remains on display to this day.

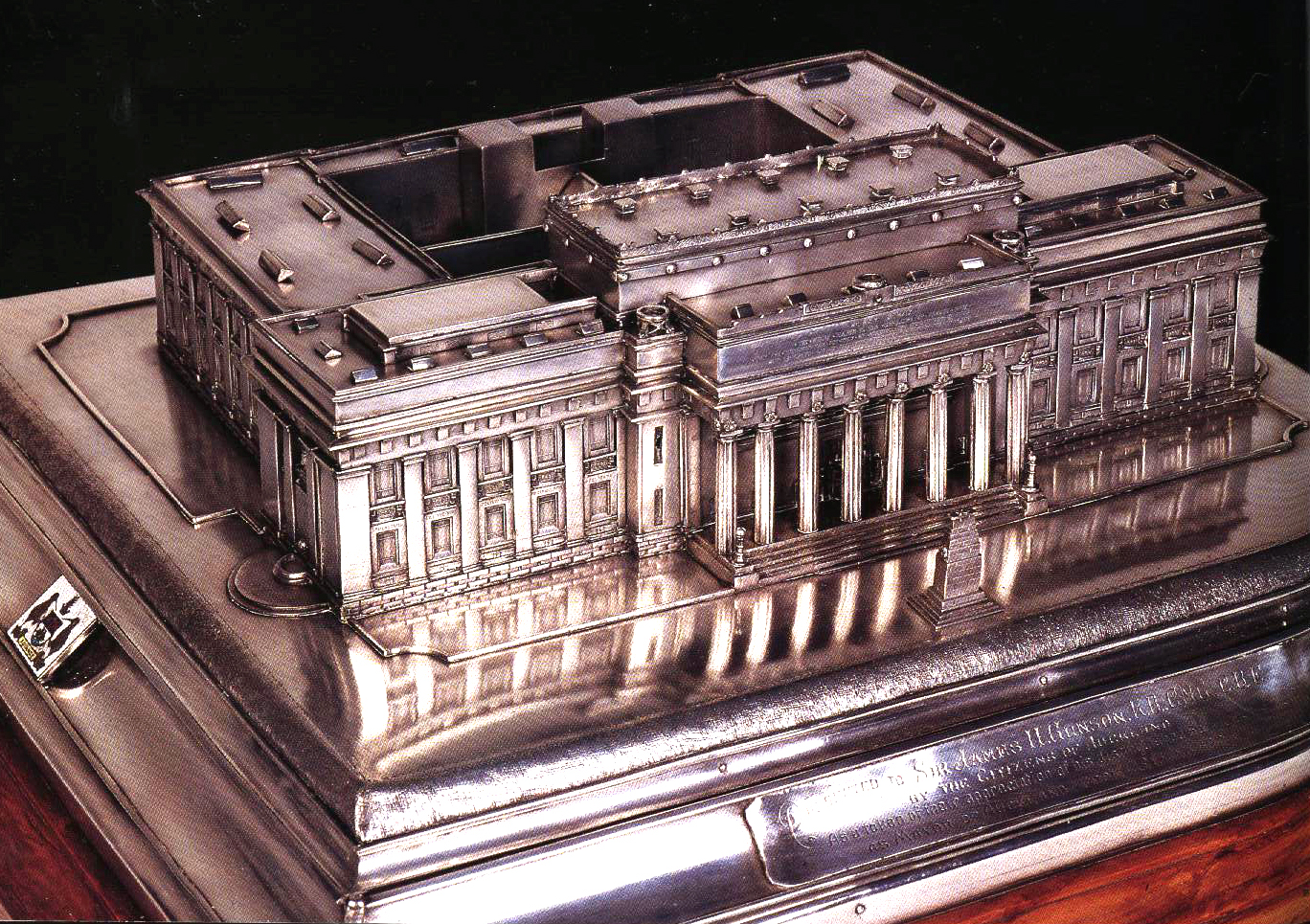
Presentation to Sir James Gunson. Auckland Museum silver model.

The building is considered to be one of the finest Greco-Roman buildings in the Southern Hemisphere. It has an 'A' classification from the New Zealand Historic Places Trust, designating it as a building whose preservation is of the utmost importance. Of particular interest is the interior plasterwork which incorporates Māori details in an amalgamation of Neo-Greek and art-deco styles. Likewise the exterior bas-reliefs, carved by Richard Gross (1882 – 1964) and depicting 20th-century armed forces and personnel, are in a style which mixes Neo-Grec with Art Deco.

Restored 19th-century plaster casts of three Greek statues—The Dying Gaul, "Laocoön and His Sons", and "Discobolus"—emphasise the Greek Revival architecture of the building, and are considered "an acknowledgement of the historical importance of the arts and learning of classical antiquity to [New Zealand's] imported European culture". They are among 33 statues donated to the museum in 1878 by a wealthy expatriate Aucklander, Thomas Russell.

The bulk of the building is English Portland stone, with detailing in New Zealand granite from the Coromandel. The quotation over the front porch—which begins "The whole earth is the sepulchre of famous men"—is attributed to the Greek statesman Pericles; its appearance is in keeping with the museum's status as a war memorial. The full text reads as follows:

MCMXIV – MCMXVIII
The whole earth is the sepulchre of famous men
They are commemorated not only by columns and inscriptions in their own country
But in foreign lands also by memorials graven not on stone
but on the hearts of men

=== Additions ===
The 1929 building was designed with a view to future extension. Two additions were made to the original building, the first in the late 1950s to commemorate the Second World War when an administration annexe with a large semi-circular courtyard was added to the southern rear. This extension is of concrete-block construction rendered in cement stucco to harmonise with the Portland stone of the earlier building. This major extension was designed by the architects M. K. and R. F. Draffin—one of the original architects and his son.

In 2006, the inner courtyard was enclosed by a "Grand Atrium" at the southern entrance.

=== Renovation and extension ===
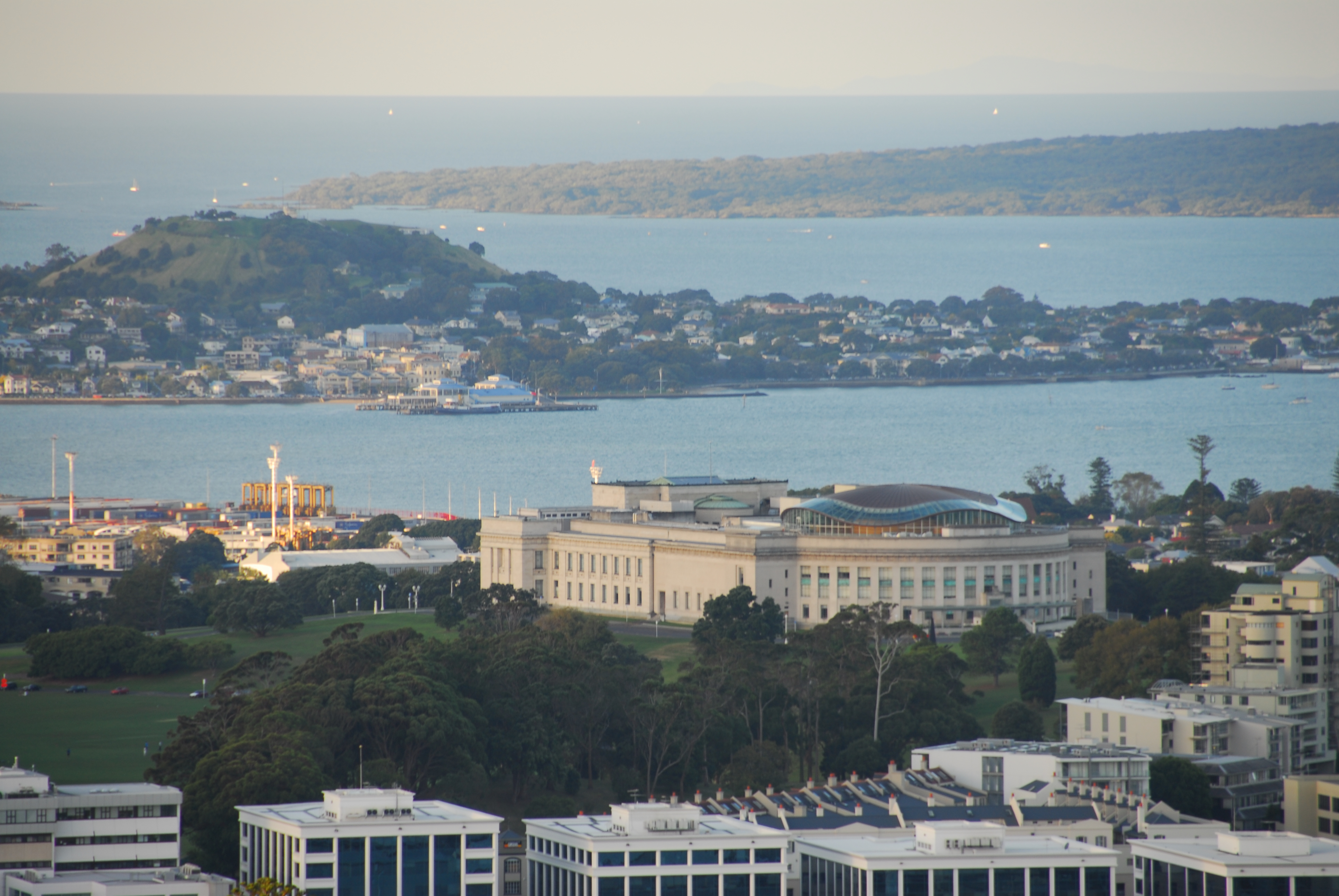
The museum seen from Maungawhau / Mount Eden, showing the wavy shape of the copper dome

In the last two decades, the museum was renovated and extended in two stages. The first stage saw the existing building restored and the exhibits partly replaced during the 1990s for NZ$43 million. The second stage of this restoration has seen a great dome and atrium constructed within the central courtyard, increasing the building's floor area by 60 per cent (an addition of 9,600 m^{2} (103,000 sq ft)) at a cost of NZ$64.5 million. NZ$27 million of that was provided by the government, with the ASB Trust (NZ$12.9 million) and other donors making up the remainder. This second stage was finished in 2007.

The copper and glass dome, as well as the viewing platform and event centre underneath it, had been criticised by some as "resembling a collapsed soufflé", but quickly won the admiration of critics and public, being noted for "its undulating lines, which echo the volcanic landscape and hills around Auckland". Standing in the event centre underneath the top of the dome was likened to being underneath the "cream-coloured belly of a giant stingray, with its rippling wings hovering over the distinctive city skyline". In June 2007, the Grand Atrium project also received the Supreme Award of the New Zealand Property Council, which noted it as being "world-class", and a successful exercise in combining complex design and heritage demands. It also received the ACENZ Innovate NZ Gold Award (Structural Engineering) for the redevelopment.

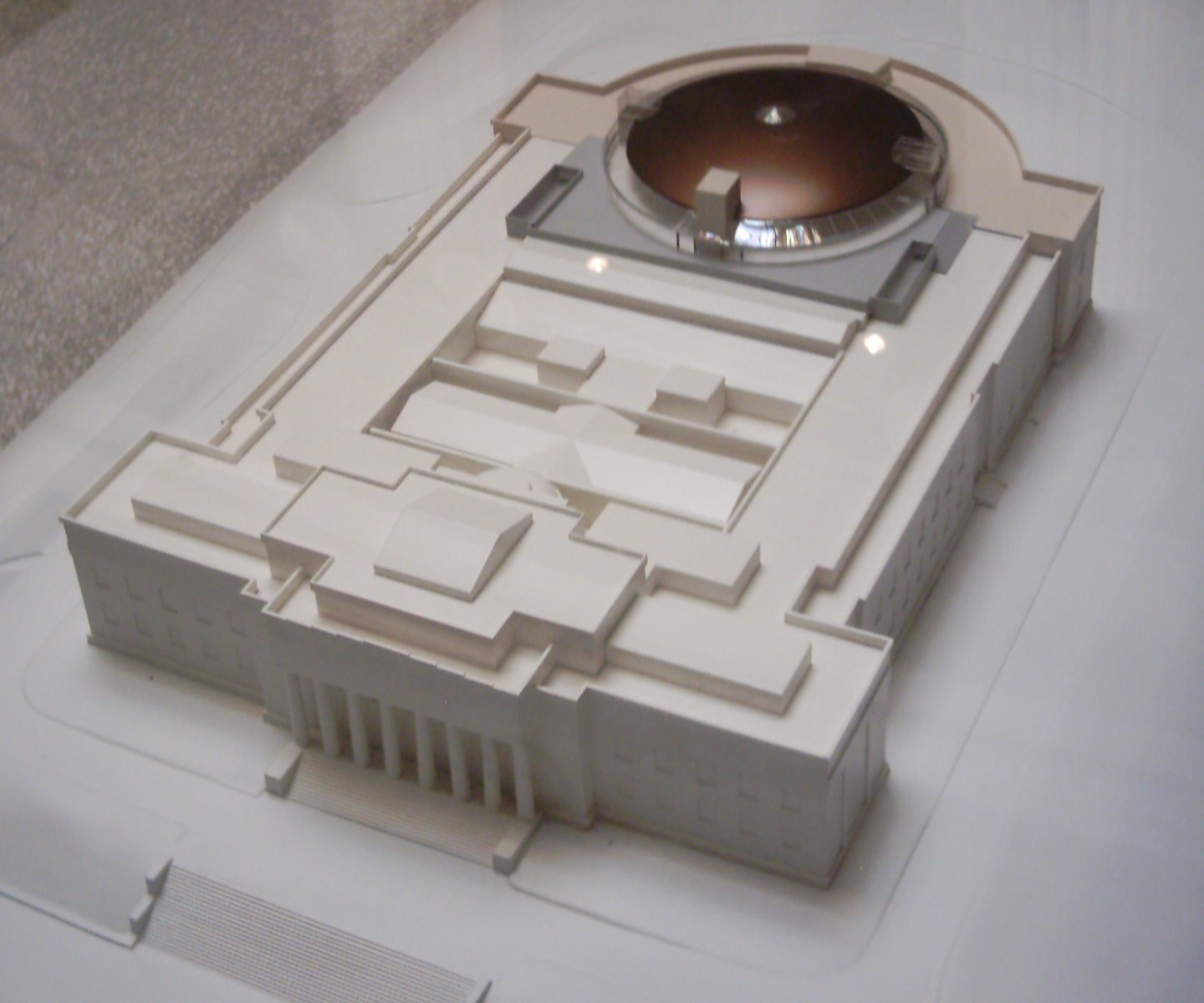
Model of the museum with the new copper dome at the rear

The new sections underneath the dome, mostly contained within a kauri-wood-panelled sphere approximately 30 m (98 ft) across, add 900 m^{2} (9,700 sq ft) of additional exhibition space, as well as an event centre under the dome roof with a free span 48 metres (157 ft) wide, plus new areas for tour and school groups, including an auditorium in the sphere-bowl with 200 seats. The bowl, which is the internal centre-piece of the expansion, weighs 700 tonnes and is suspended free-hanging from trusses spanning over it from the four elevator shafts located around it.

The new sections of the museum have been favourably likened to a Matryoshka doll—buildings nested within a building.

In 2020, the museum opened a new set of exhibitions called Tāmaki Herenga Waka: Stories of Auckland. This includes sections on the land, water, and city, as well as specific areas focused on activism and data visualisation. The data visualisation section, titled Living City: Rarau mai, explores the city's ethnically diverse population with large-scale visual displays focusing on three themes: people, environment and systems. This was created in collaboration with Data Visualisation Design Consultancy firm Oom Creative and draws from a range of databases including iNaturalist, National Institute for Water and Atmospheric Research (NIWA), and census data. The exhibition includes a soundscape by Marco Cher-Gibard.

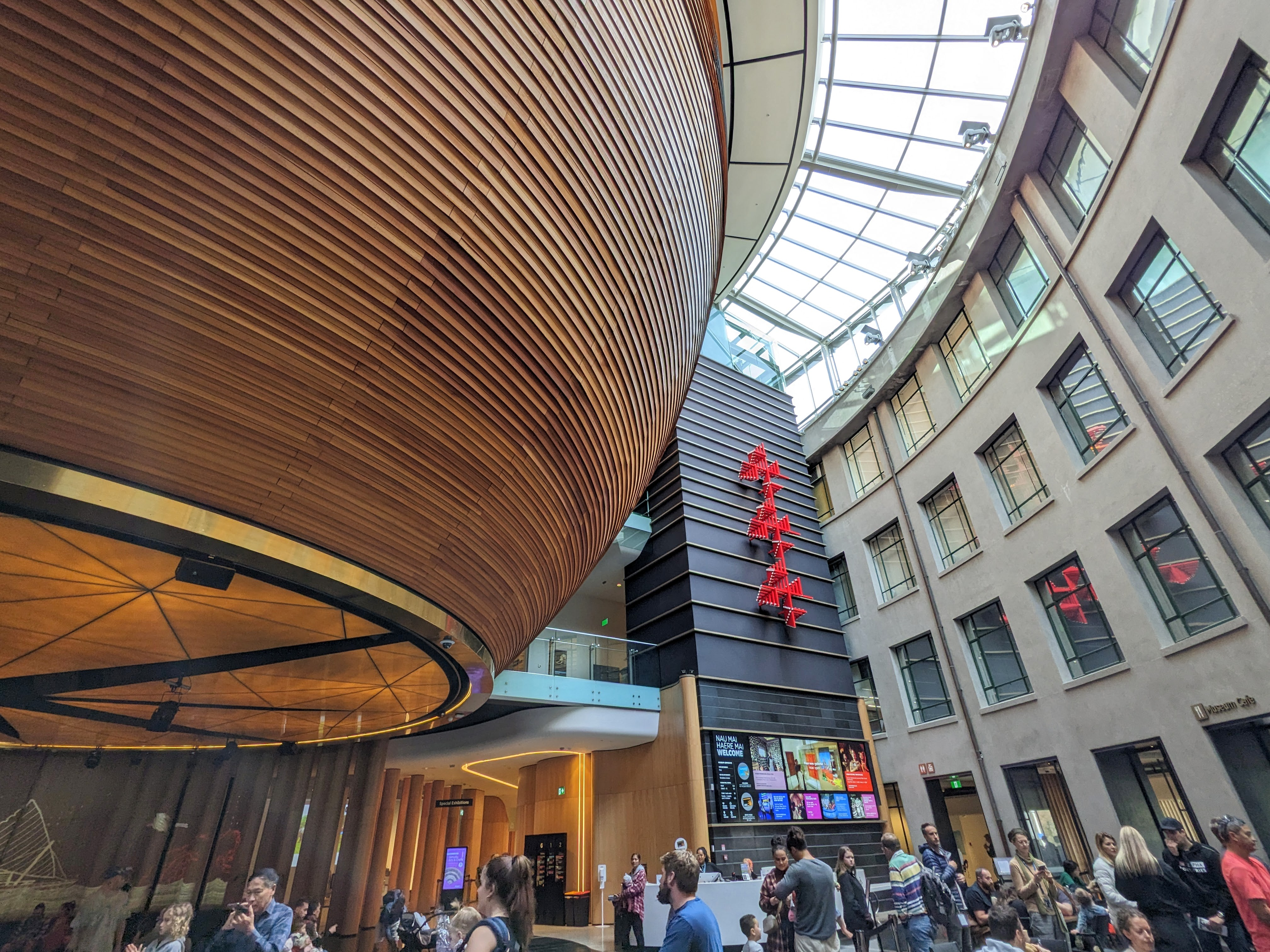
Te Ao Mārama (the realm of Being and Light), South Atrium of the Auckland War Memorial Museum, completed in 2020

Also in 2020 was the opening of the redesigned South Atrium entrance, Te Ao Mārama. This built on Auckland architect Noel Lane's 2006 design which featured the large Samoan-inspired Tanoa bowl at its core. The new atrium was a design collaboration between Australasian architecture firms, Jasmax, Francis-Jones Morehen Thorp, and designTRIBE, in collaboration with Iwi and Pasifika communities in Auckland, with a multicultural focus. Under the Tanoa bowl is an AV installation containing stories from Ngāti Whātua Orākei, Ngāti Paoa and Waikato Tainui. Te Ao Mārama won Supreme Award and Civic Award at the 2021 Interior Awards.

Several artworks were commissioned for Te Ao Mārama. The gateway (titled Te Tatau Kaitiaki) was created by artist Graham Tipene. It depicts two manaia, as well as Tipene's grandmother, and his mother, who died in 2014. Tipene called the commission "a huge honour", saying "When I heard I was given this task, my first thought was mum." Placed centrally in the atrium is Manulua—twin sculptures by Tongan artist Sopolemalama Filipe Tohi. They represent the traditional practise of lalava (lashing) and symbolise "the unity of all things past, present and future." Outside the entrance is the sculpture Whaowhia by Brett Graham, a nod to the purpose of the museum as a war memorial and as a holder of knowledge. Finally, Wāhi Whakanoa, two new whakanoa by Chris Bailey, were commissioned for the space, inspired by Hine-pū-te-hue, the female guardian of the hue, and Rongomātāne, the god associated with peace and cultivated plants.

== Collections, exhibitions and research ==
Auckland Museum's collections are organised into three principal areas: documentary heritage (manuscripts, correspondence and other historical documents in archives, along with pictorial art); the major branches of the natural sciences; and human history (broadly, material culture). The museum maintains a high degree of regional cooperation and complementary collecting with other organisations across Auckland (among them Auckland Libraries and Auckland Art Gallery Toi o Tāmaki), and has done since its inception.

=== Documentary Heritage ===
The museum's nationally and internationally significant Documentary Heritage collections comprise manuscripts, ephemera, maps, charts and plans, newspapers and periodicals, rare and contemporary books and pamphlets, photographs, and works of art in the form of paintings, bookplates, and sketches and drawings. Among the areas of significant focus are Māori and Pacific cultures, the human and natural history of the Greater Auckland region, New Zealanders' involvement in global conflicts, and exploration and discovery. The museum holds the only known extant copy of A Korao no New Zealand, the first book written in the Māori language, published at Sydney in 1815 by the missionary Thomas Kendall.

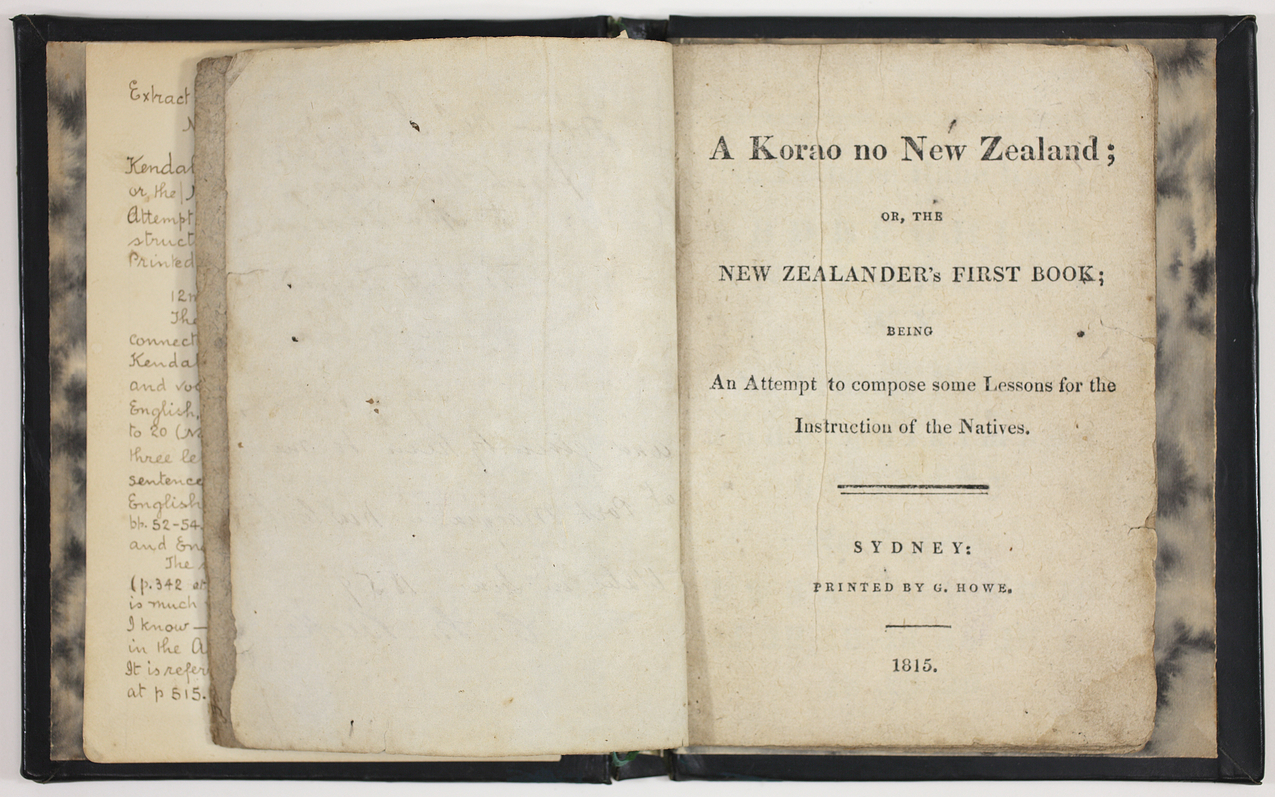

==== Pictorial ====
The museum has considerable holdings in historic paintings, rare watercolours, photographs and other artworks. The Pictorial collection numbers in the millions, and contains some of the earliest examples of the development of the photographic arts and technology in New Zealand, including calotypes by William Fox Talbot; some of the first known daguerrotypes made in New Zealand, and an ambrotype portrait of the Ngā Puhi chief Tāmati Wāka Nene attributed to John Nicol Crombie.

The latter part of the 20th century is substantially represented by the collection of the documentary photographer Robin Morrison, while among the women photographers of note represented are Una Garlick and Margaret Matilda White. Other collections include the documentary photographs of the Auckland Star and New Zealand Herald newspapers; some work by Arthur Ninnis Breckon and George Bourne, including images made for the Auckland Weekly News; the work of Tudor Washington Collins and John Watt Beattie, and the archive of Sparrow Industrial Pictures. The paintings and drawings collection includes works by Charles Heaphy, Gustavus von Tempsky, George French Angas, and John Webster, as well as portraits of Māori by C. F. Goldie and Gottfried Lindauer, and an impressive set of albums by the 19th-century clergyman and watercolour artist John Kinder. The museum also has a significant bookplate collection, which contains more than 7,000 plates collected by the Australian scholar Percy Neville Barnett.

==== Manuscripts and archives ====
The Manuscripts and Archives collection is of major regional importance and, at approximately 2,000 linear metres, it is one of the largest non-governmental archives in New Zealand. The collection covers large organisational and business archives and smaller personal collections which record and illustrate New Zealanders' lives within the country and abroad, especially during military service.

Among the personal papers held at the museum are 19th-century papers relating to the pioneering Williams family and the Reverend Vicesimus Lush; the papers of the politician John Logan Campbell, who has been called "the father of Auckland"; the mountaineer, explorer and philanthropist Edmund Hillary; and those of the British Resident James Busby. In addition, the Library also holds the papers of:

- Former Museum Director and Curator Thomas Frederick Cheeseman
- Botanist Leonard Cockayne
- Librarian and author Johannes C. Andersen
- Historians Ruth Ross and Jack Lee (Note: John Roland Preston Lee, 1913–1998.)
- Potter, writer, and conservationist Barry Brickell

Among the companies and organisations represented in the collection are:

- Crown Lynn Potteries (covering the period 1959–1987)
- The Martha Gold Mining Company (covering the period 1915–1951)
- Seed merchants Arthur Yates & Co. (covering the period 1882–1940)
- Pelorus Press Ltd. (covering the period 1947–1978)
- The Farmers' Trading Company (covering the period 1909–1987)

The collection includes both local and national society records; some examples include:

- Ornithological Society of New Zealand
- Auckland Society of Arts
- Auckland Acclimatisation Society
- Auckland Amateur Operatic Society
- Auckland Choral Society
- Auckland Studio Potters
- Auckland Photographic Society

The Library is the repository of the Presbyterian Church records for Auckland and Northland.

About 600 manuscripts contain material by or about women. These provide fascinating insights into the lives of both pioneering and contemporary women, and are described in the museum publication Womanscripts, compiled by Sue Loughlin and Carolyn Morris (1995).

Nearly 300 manuscripts are described as being Māori or having Māori elements. Most of these are recorded in Jenifer Curnow's 1995 book Ngā Pou Ārahi, a tribal inventory relating to Māori treasures, language, genealogy, songs, history, customs and proverbs.

==== Maps and plans ====
The museum is one of a small number of organisations in New Zealand which collects and cares for historic maps. The map collection contains large sequences of official New Zealand maps, WWII-era military maps, subdivision plans, and other material, including atlases, which helps record and provide evidence of early New Zealand development. There is also a small collection of significant maps relating to the discovery and exploration of the Pacific Ocean and islands by Europeans, dating from before 1800.

==== Serials and newspapers ====
Serials were the first collection items ordered by the Auckland Institute when it was formed in 1867. There are approximately 4,500 historical and current titles in the assemblage, excluding electronic journals. The extent, and in some cases uniqueness, of the museum's holdings of historical and current journals makes their research value of national importance.

The museum holds the country's most significant collection of Auckland newspapers, based on a 1967 donation by Wilson & Horton of their historical Auckland newspapers dating from the early 1840s and supplemented by individual donations. The museum contributes to the research site Papers Past, as well as to the national network of institutions that hold historical newspapers.

==== Museum Library Te Pātaka Mātāpuna ====
The museum's own business and research archives (covering its governance, curation, exhibitions, education, publishing, building development and maintenance, and internal management) are housed alongside the above, and are accessed by way of the Museum Library Te Pātaka Mātāpuna, one of the country's leading heritage research libraries. The library's collections of books and other publications are focused on New Zealand subject areas and are developed chiefly to support curatorial work and collecting, but also feature significant holdings of Māori-language material, and an impressive collection of rare books, including 16th-century herbals and florilegia, and a number of rare volumes on conchology. In addition, there exists an extensive collection of ephemera, built for the most part on donations from private collectors starting in the 19th century.

=== Natural sciences ===
The museum's natural sciences collections are principally a research and reference assemblage that provides information on the distribution and morphology of plant, animal and mineral species in New Zealand and the regional Pacific. The museum stores and exhibits 1.5 million natural history specimens from the fields of botany, entomology, geology, land vertebrates and marine biology.

==== Botany ====
AK is the index herbariorum code for the Auckland War Memorial Museum.

The botanical collections of the Auckland Museum Herbarium (AK) were first established in 1870, and are the means by which the department carries out its function of collection and preservation of botanical materials, education—through public enquiries, individual and group visits, outreach programmes, and the display of material—and research and publication on various aspects of New Zealand flora. The focus of the herbarium collection is on wild plants (native and naturalised) in all plant groups principally from northern New Zealand and its offshore islands. Auckland Museum's is one of only three significantly sized herbaria in New Zealand; the others are at Landcare Research Auckland and the Museum of New Zealand Te Papa Tongarewa, in Wellington.

The herbarium contains a number of collections from significant botanists including Thomas Cheeseman (curator, 1874–1923), and Captain James Cook's botanists, Joseph Banks and Daniel Solander. The Herbarium holds over 333,000 botanical specimens—including 200,000 angiosperms, 5,000 gymnosperms, 30,000 pteridophytes, 21,500 mosses, 12,300 liverworts, 22,000 algae, 27,200 lichens, and 1,000 timber samples. The museum also holds a substantial collection of kauri gum, and a specialist collection of "fern books" (bound collections of ferns made by amateurs and professionals) along with a small "wet" collection (specimens preserved in liquid) of flowers, fruit and algae.

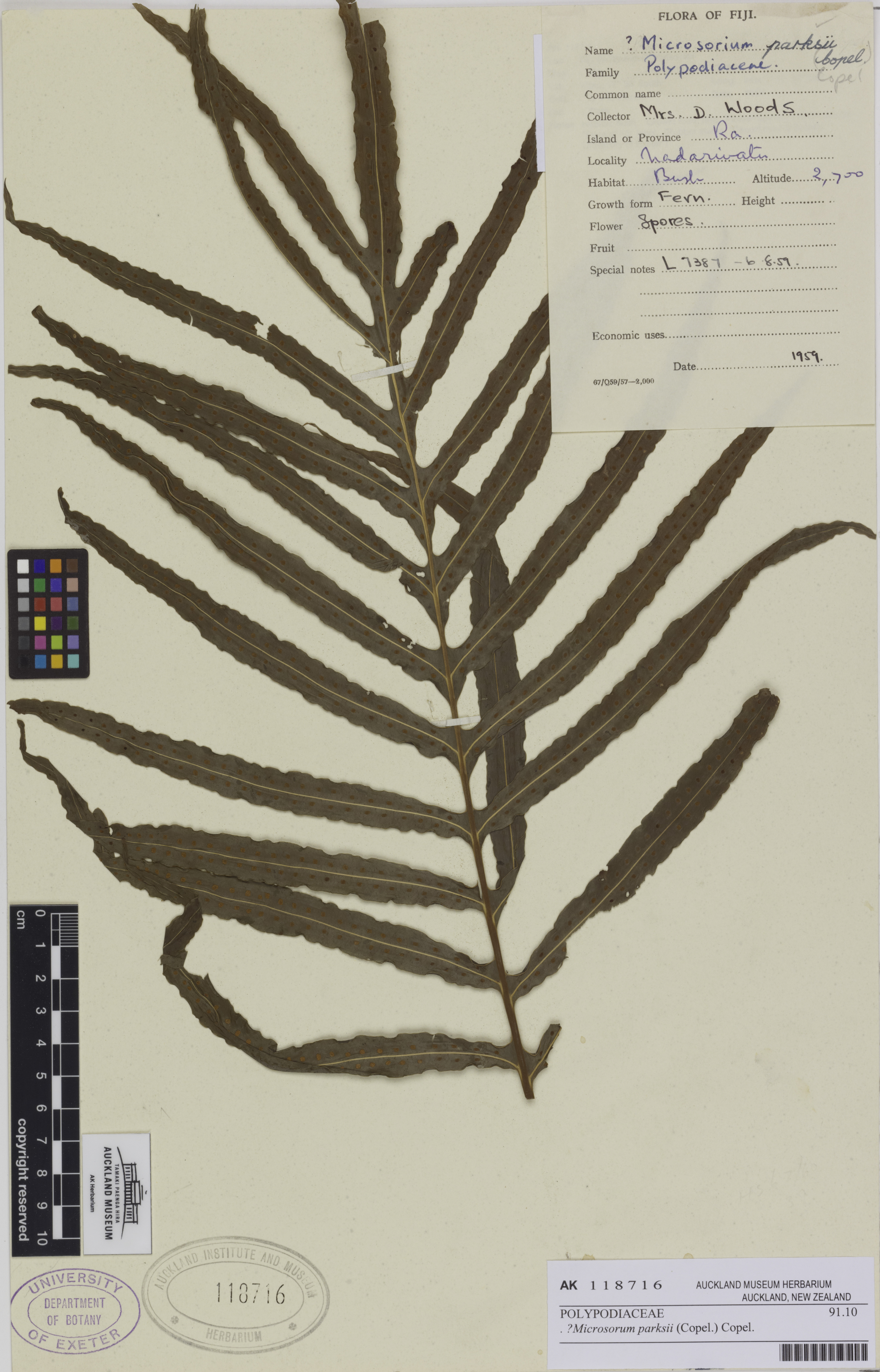

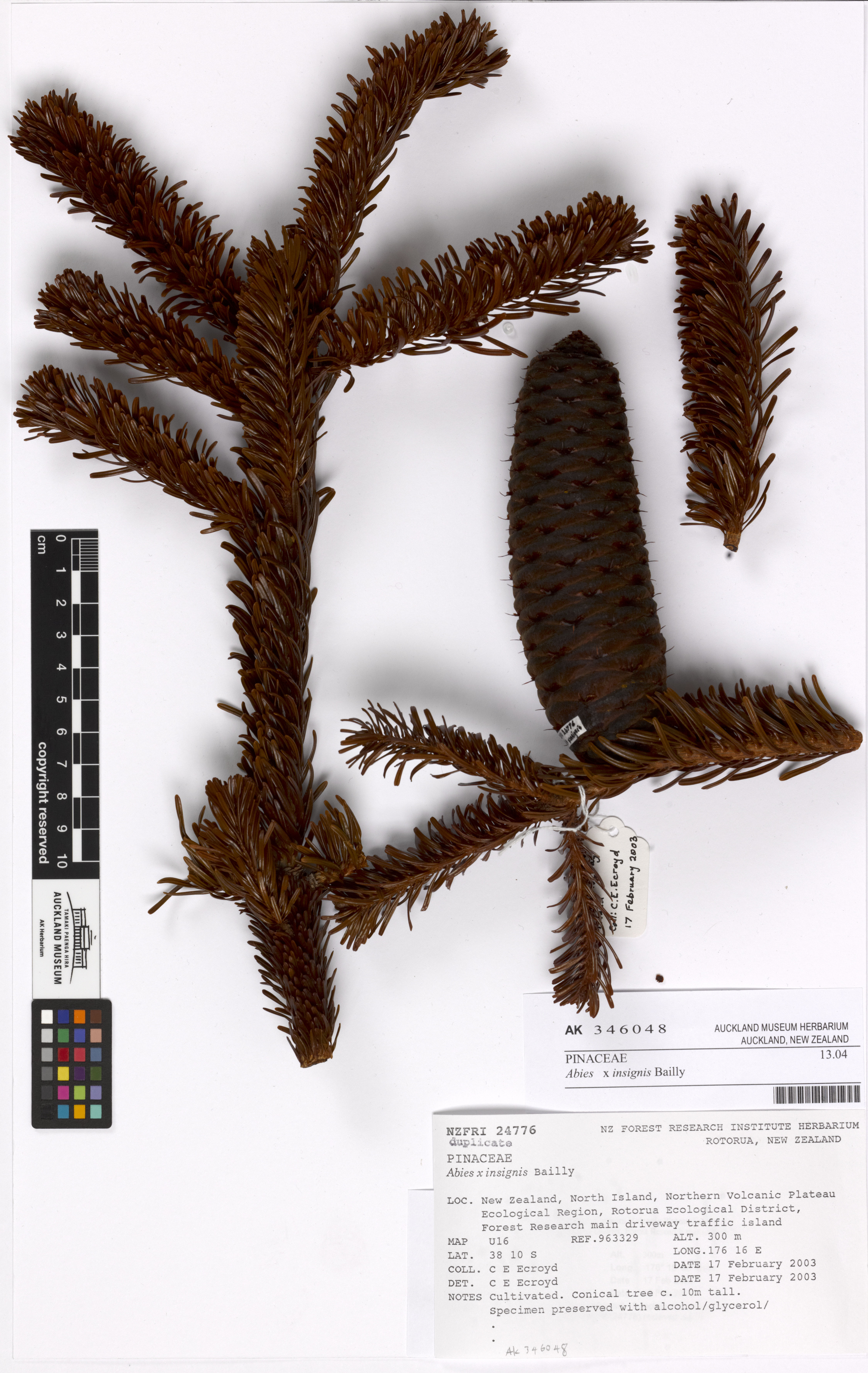

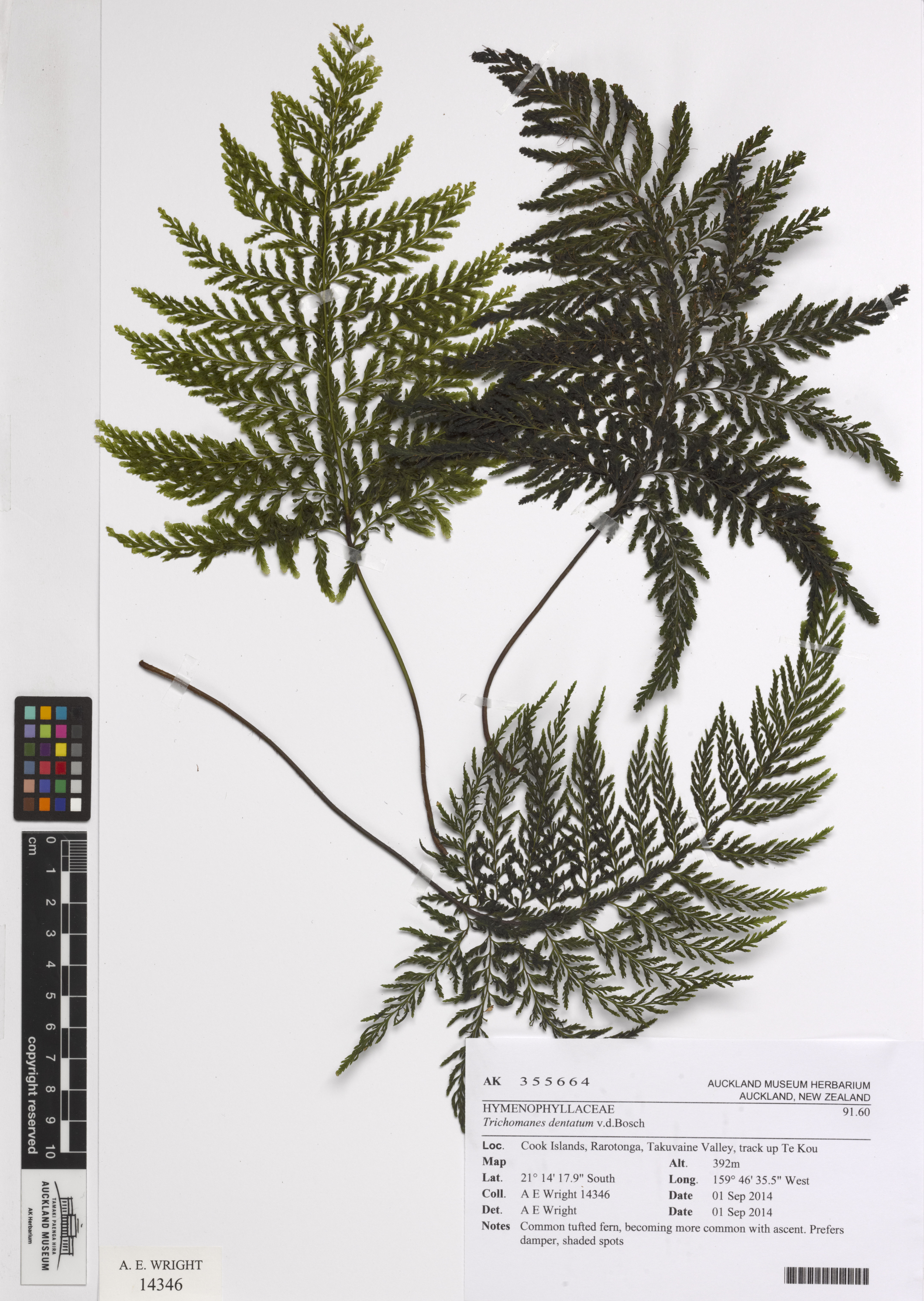

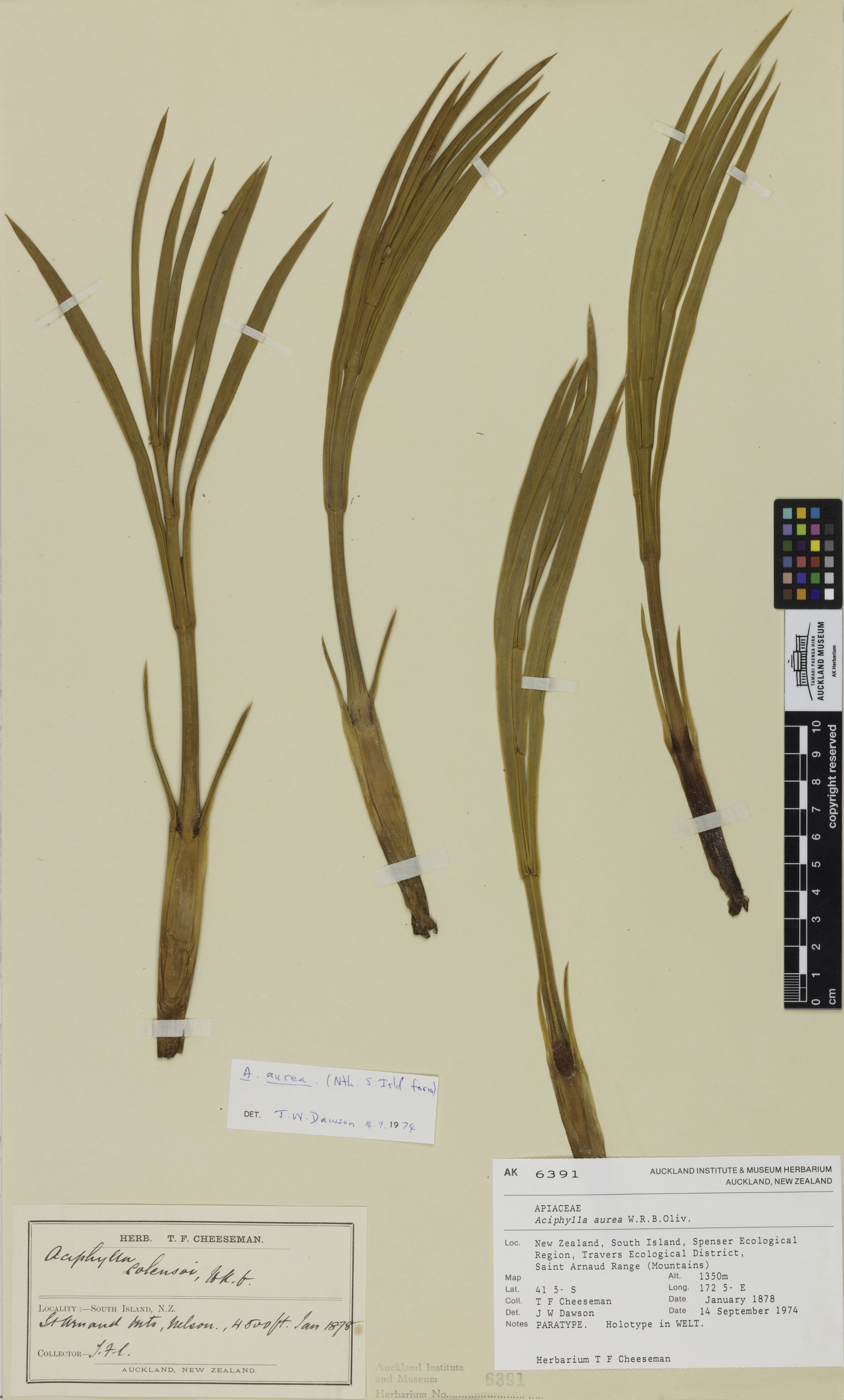

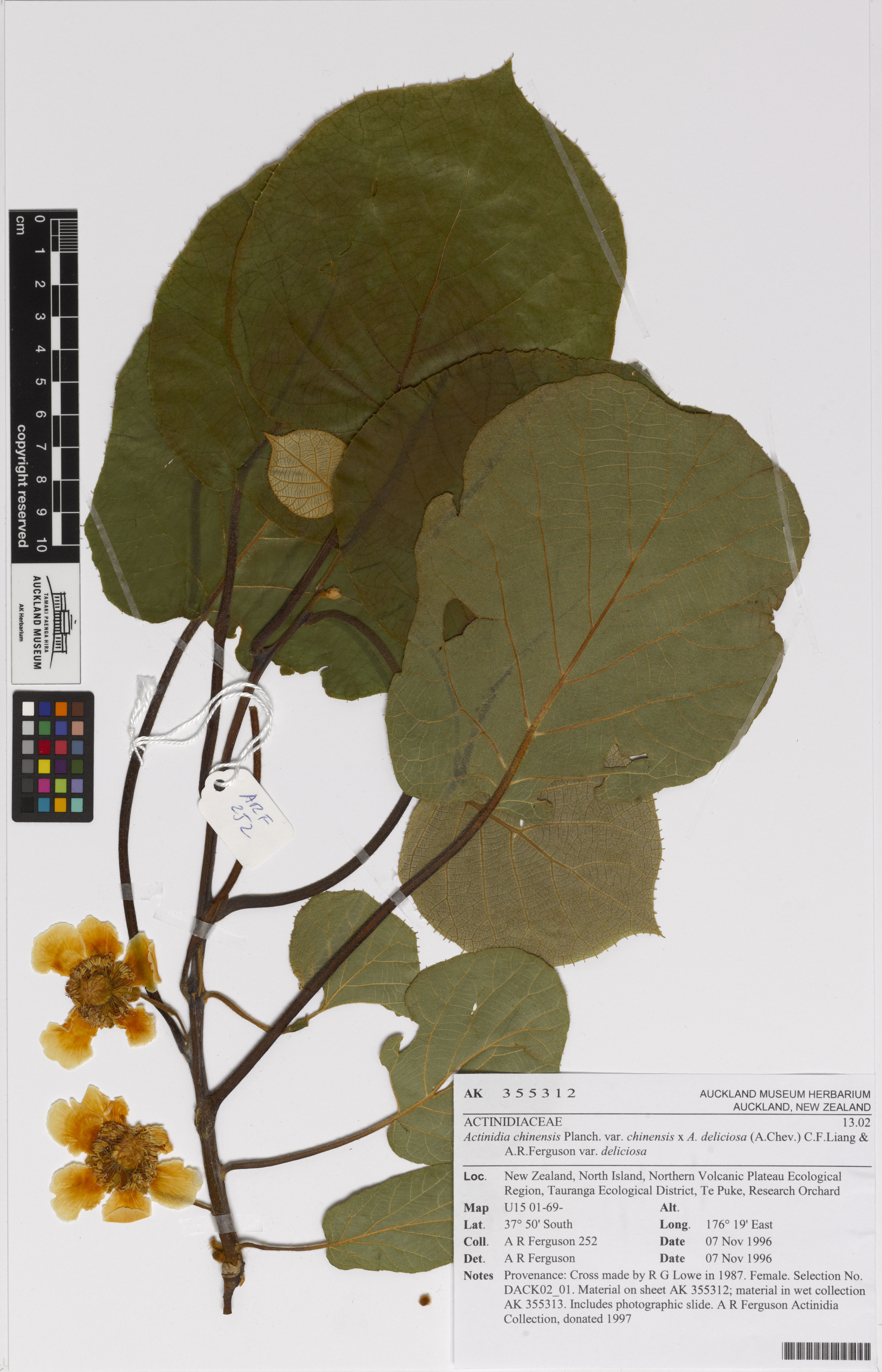

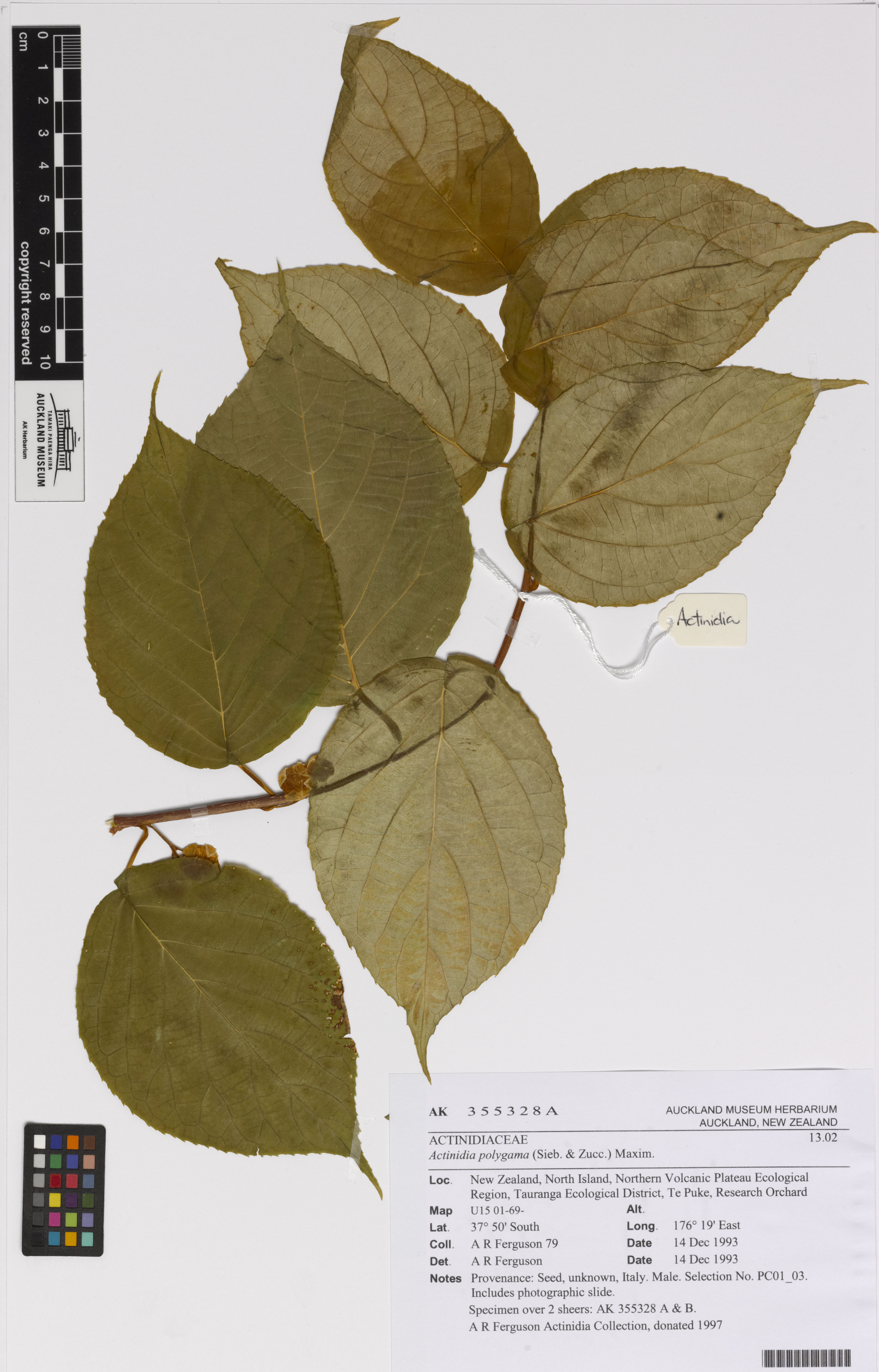

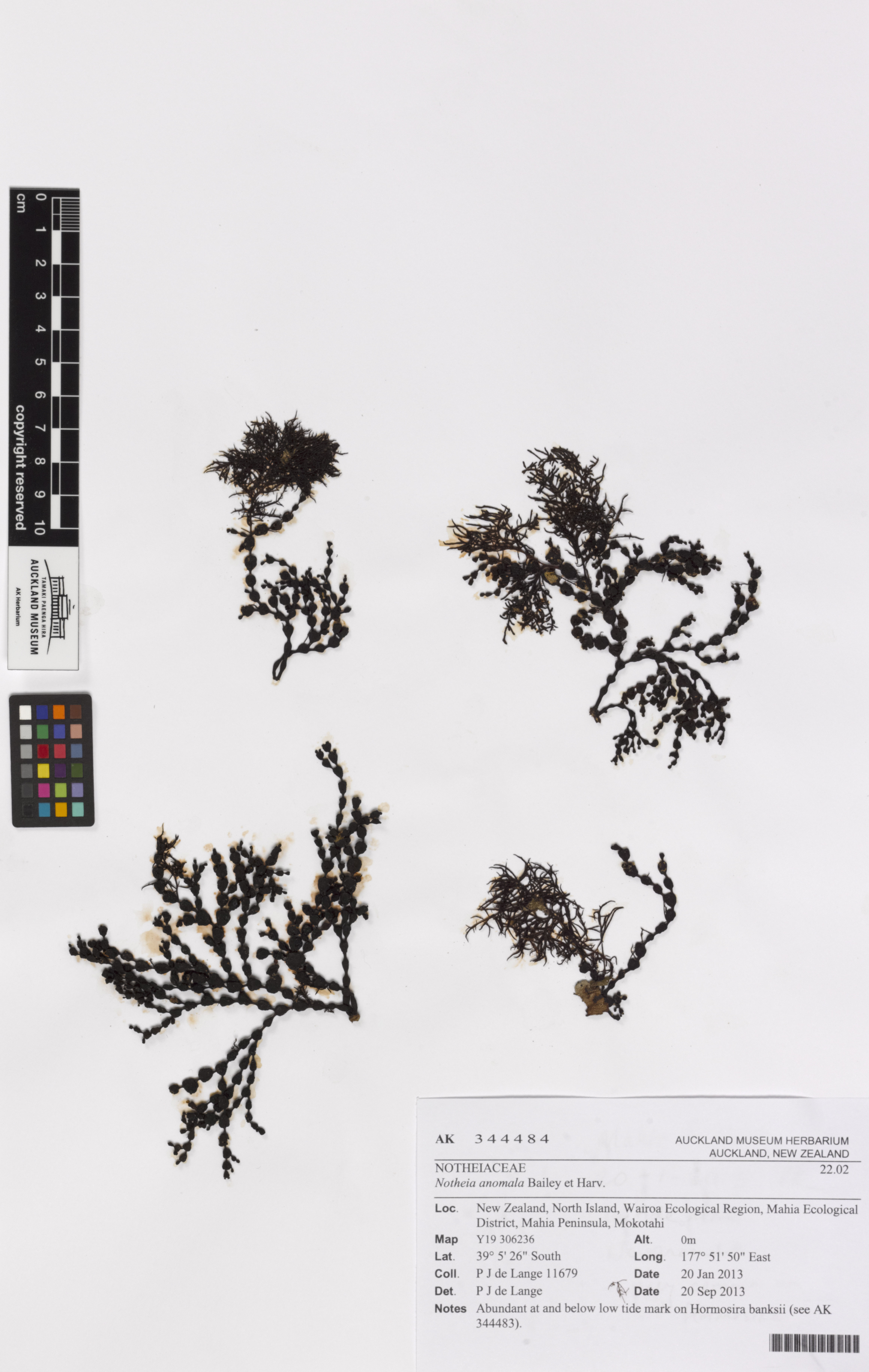

==== Entomology ====
The Entomology collection contains about 250,000 catalogued specimens and, while focused on the northern areas of New Zealand, includes important collections ranging from Three Kings Islands to the sub-Antarctic Islands. It is part of a national and international network and aims to contain a comprehensive reference collection of all insect types as well as other terrestrial and freshwater invertebrates (worms, spiders, millipedes and centipedes, some isopods and amphipods) from the New Zealand region. This includes both native and introduced species. Its importance lies in the ability to support research into the biodiversity of New Zealand's terrestrial invertebrates (particularly beetles, moths and parasitic wasps), and their contribution to complex ecologies. Foreign collections of beetles and butterflies feature also, for comparative and educational value.

In 2009, the museum acquired a collection of butterflies and books about butterflies bequeathed by the late Ray Shannon, a private collector whose interest in lepidopterology began while he was stationed in the Solomon Islands during the Second World War. The collection contains about 13,000 specimens of just under 3,000 species and subspecies.

==== Geology ====
The Geology collection was originally focused on material from the Waihi, Thames and Coromandel gold fields, through deliberate collecting by the museum's geologists as well as those donated by private collectors. It has been augmented by volcanic specimens of research and historical interest. The collection of around 12,000 specimens contains a number of nationally significant materials, and supports research work and collections held at other museums, universities and Crown Research Institutes.

==== Paleontology ====
The Palaeontology collection was established in the early 1900s and, with more than 20,000 specimen lots, is one of the largest collections of fossil invertebrates in New Zealand. Its importance lies in its ability to contribute understanding of evolutionary change, past biodiversity and the record of dynamic change during the past 65 million years with rapid submergence and uplift at various times during New Zealand's geological history. Past climate change and the significance of glacial cycles and oscillation are reflected in the specimens and their associated data as well.

==== Land vertebrates ====
The Land Vertebrates collection comprises more than 12,500 bird specimens, 2,500 amphibians and reptiles, and 1,000 land mammals, primarily collected from Northern New Zealand. Among the specimens are the oldest surviving New Zealand stuffed birds, bought around 1856–57, from Mr I. St John, a taxidermist from Nelson. The collection is particularly strong in kiwi and moa, oceanic seabirds, penguins, cormorants, ducks, waders and allies (Charadriiformes), passerine birds, tuatara, geckos, skinks, Pacific reptiles and New Zealand bats.

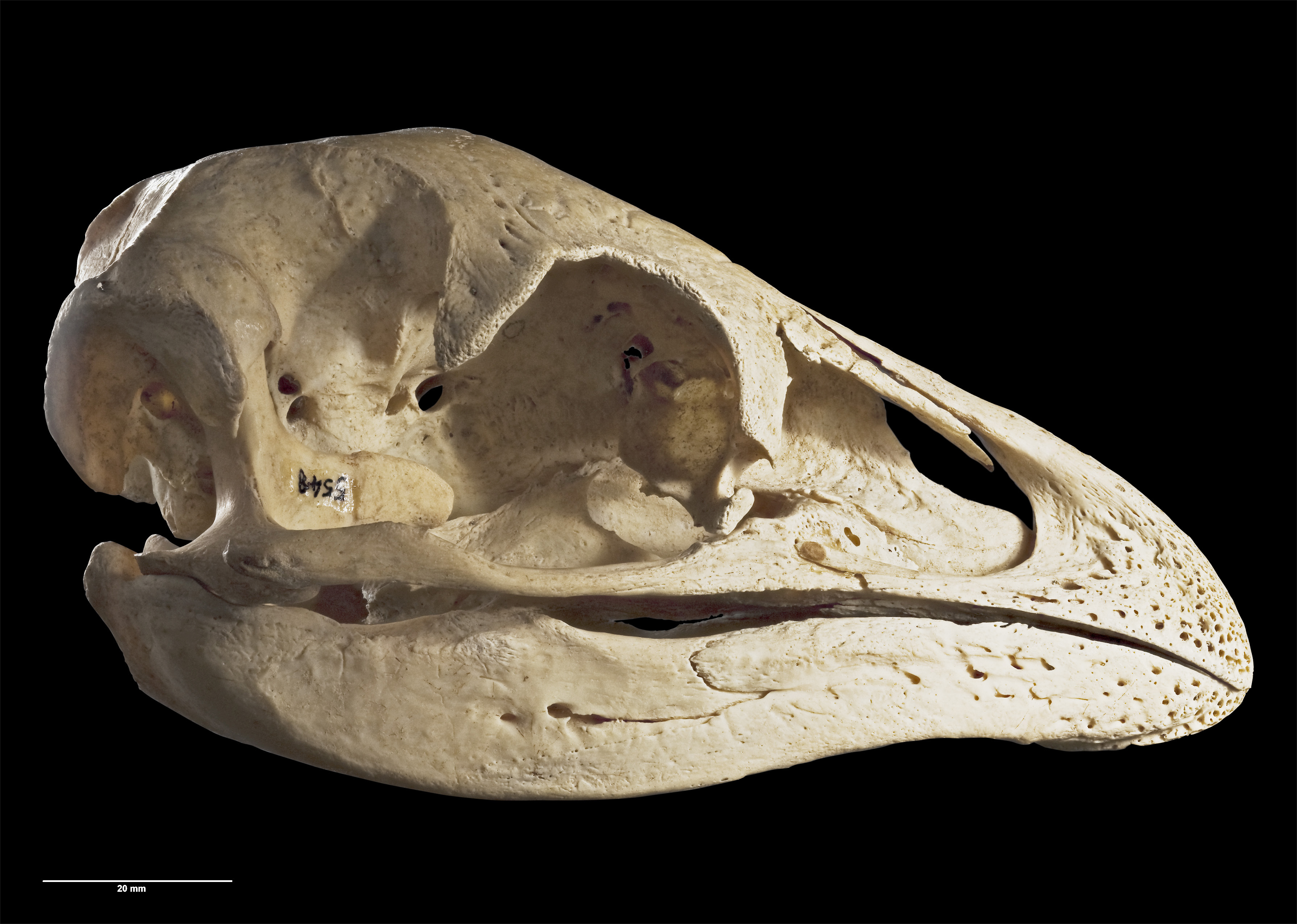

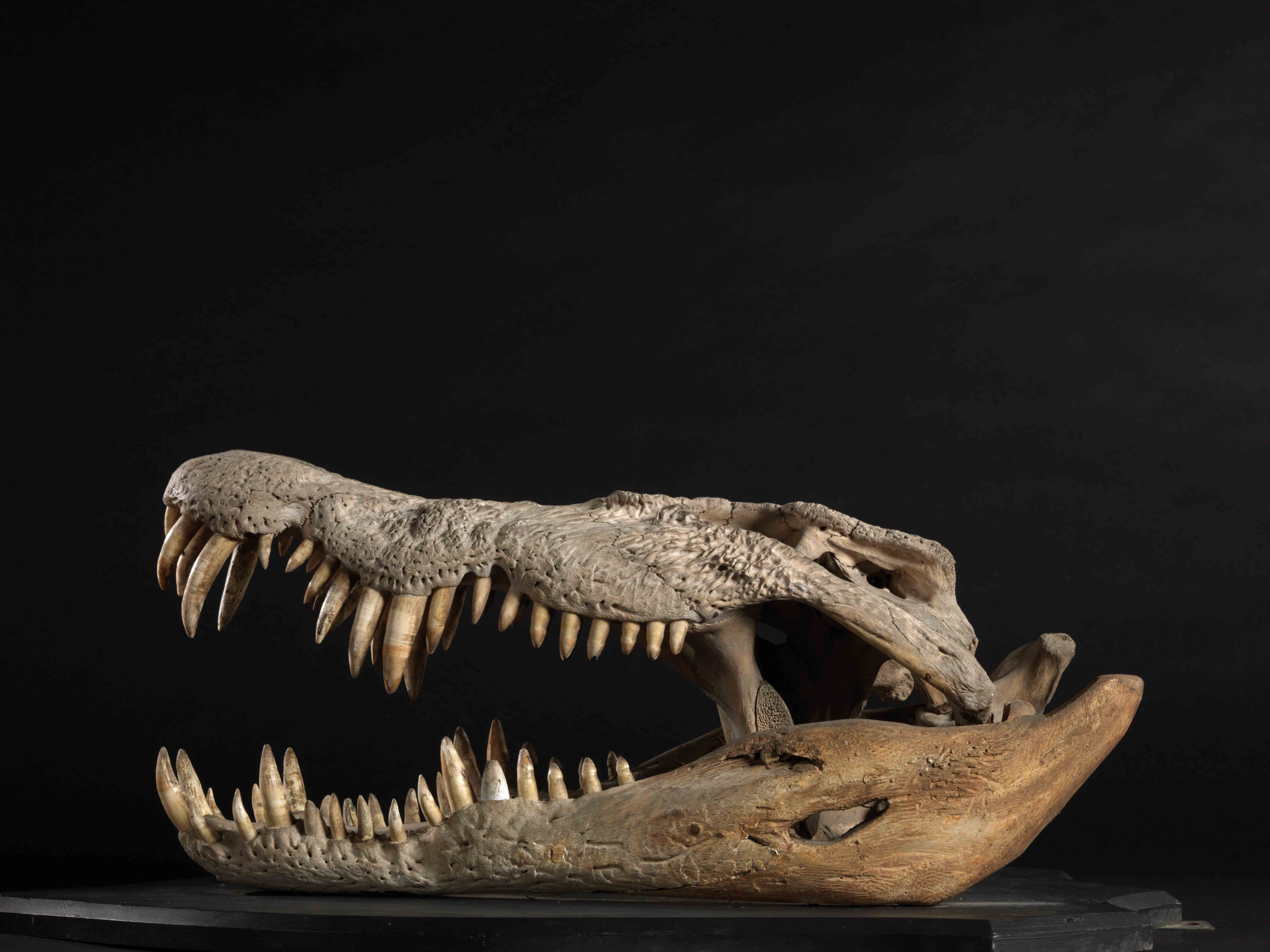

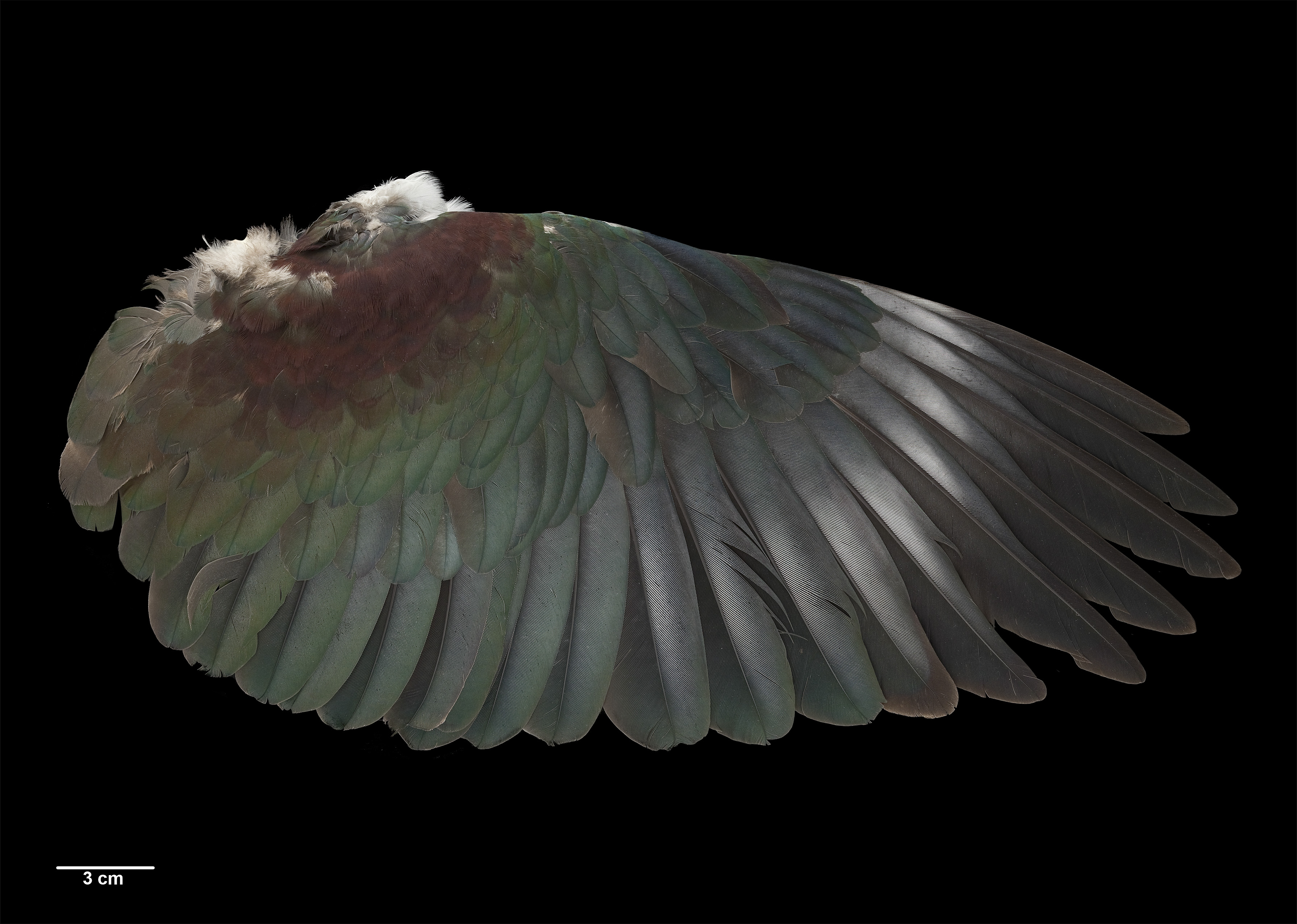

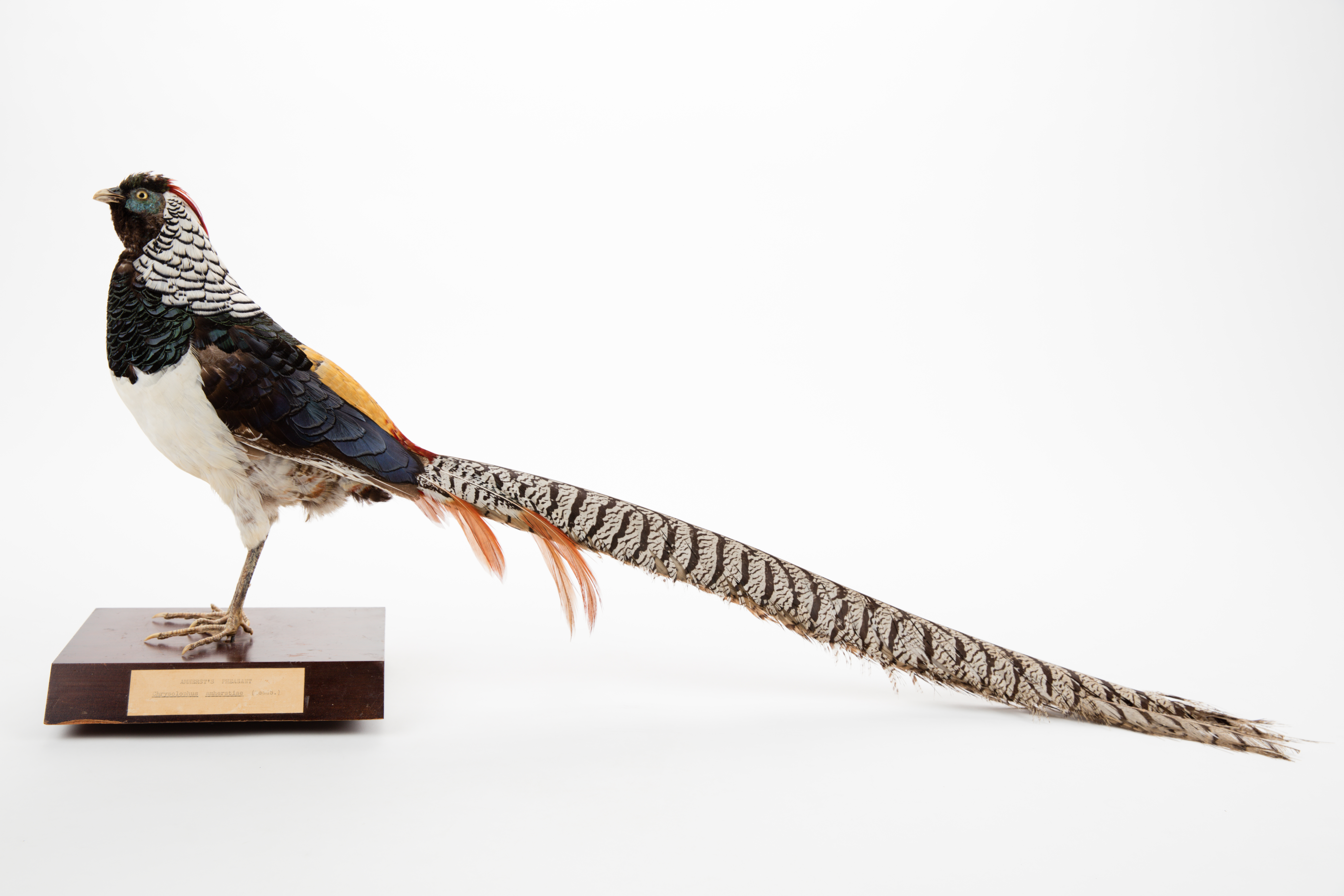

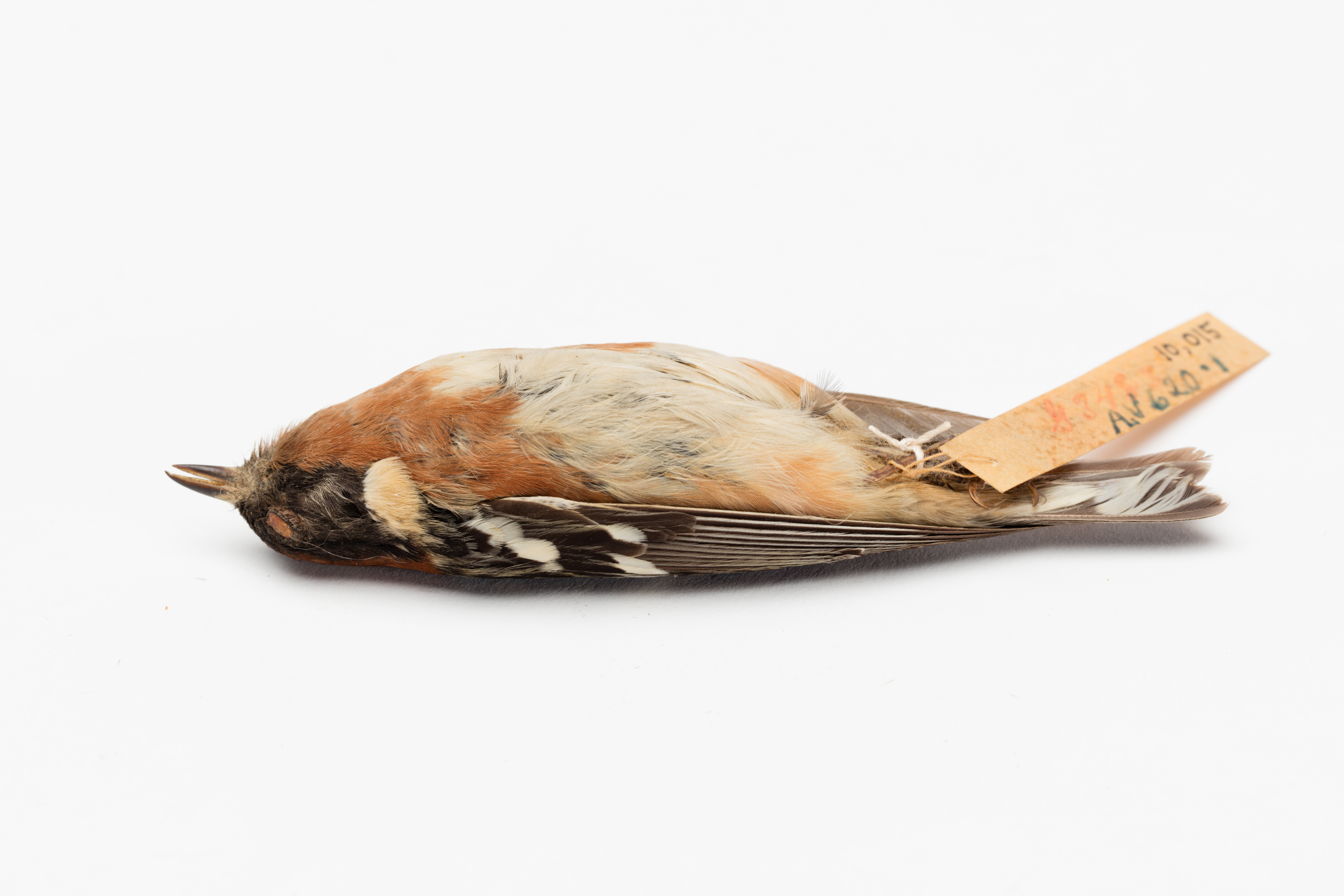

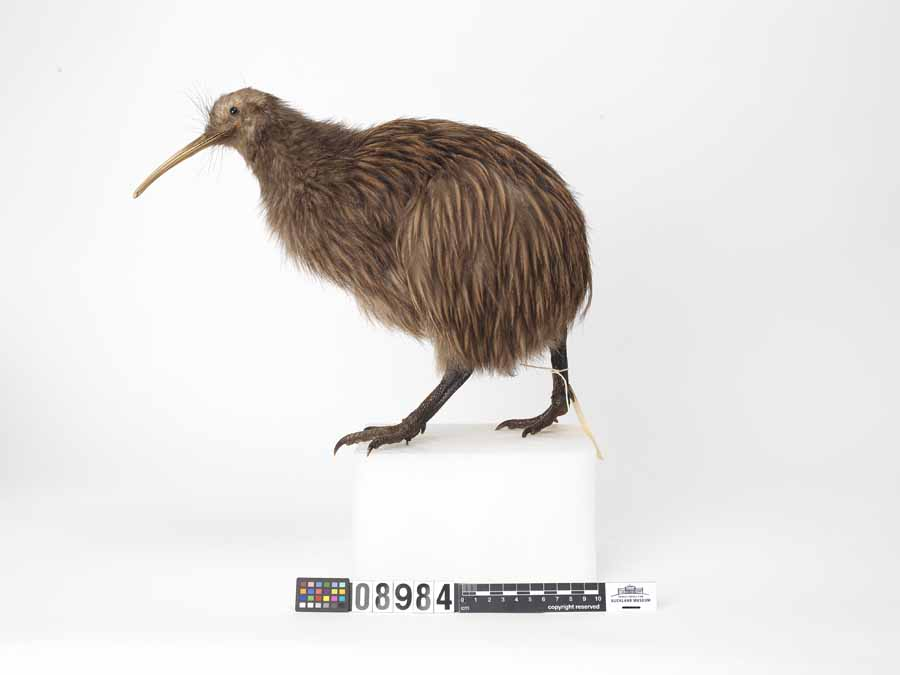
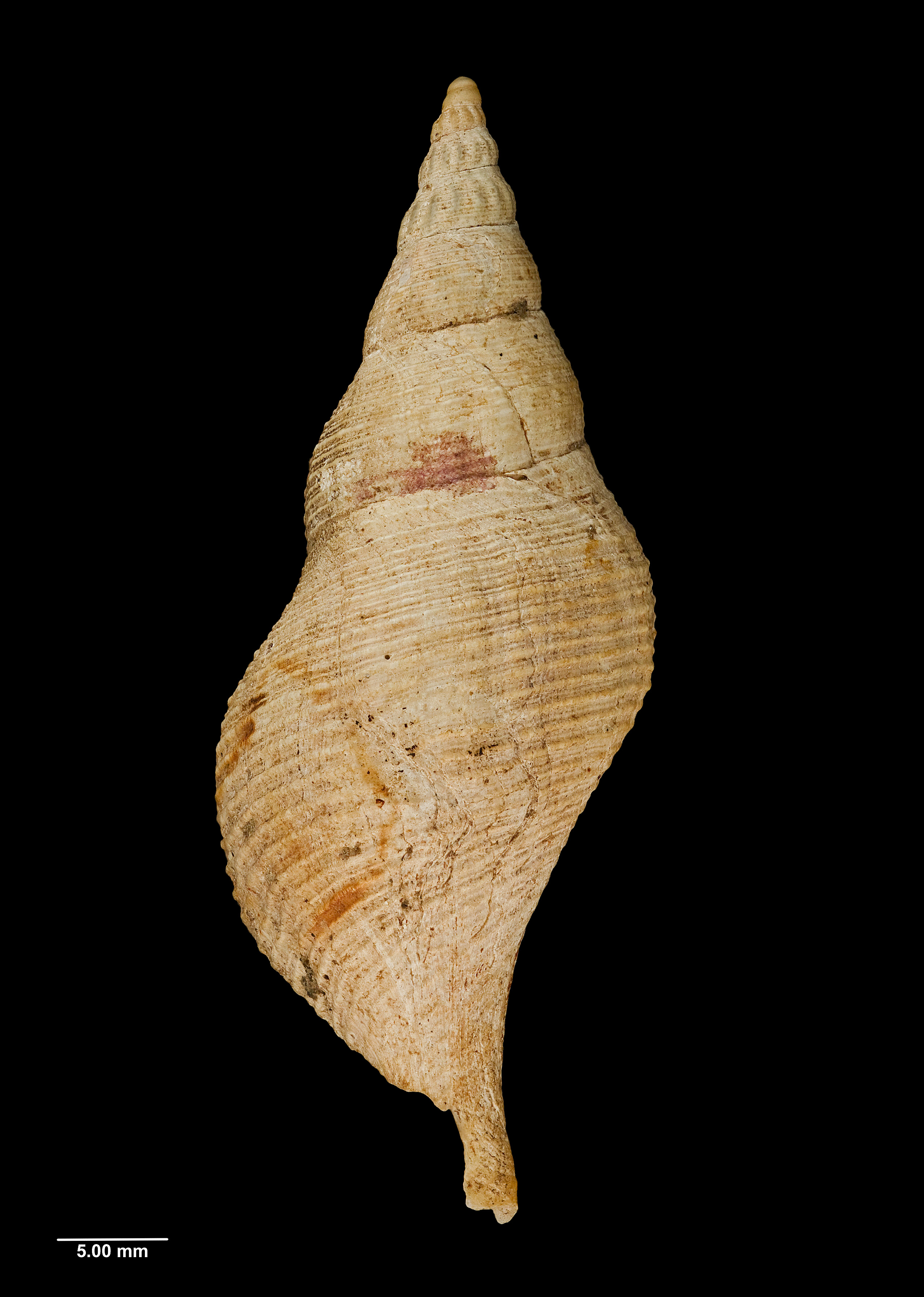

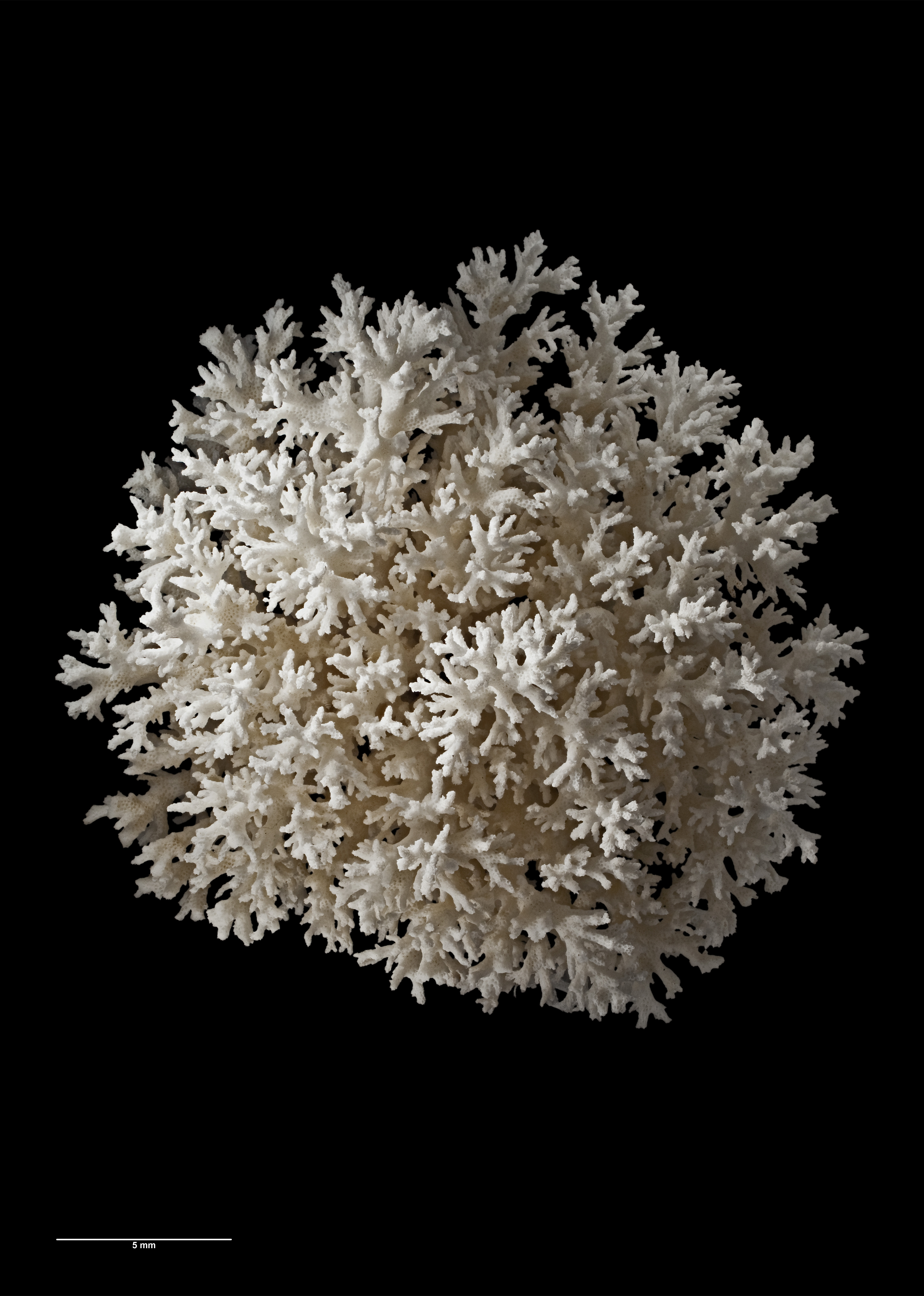

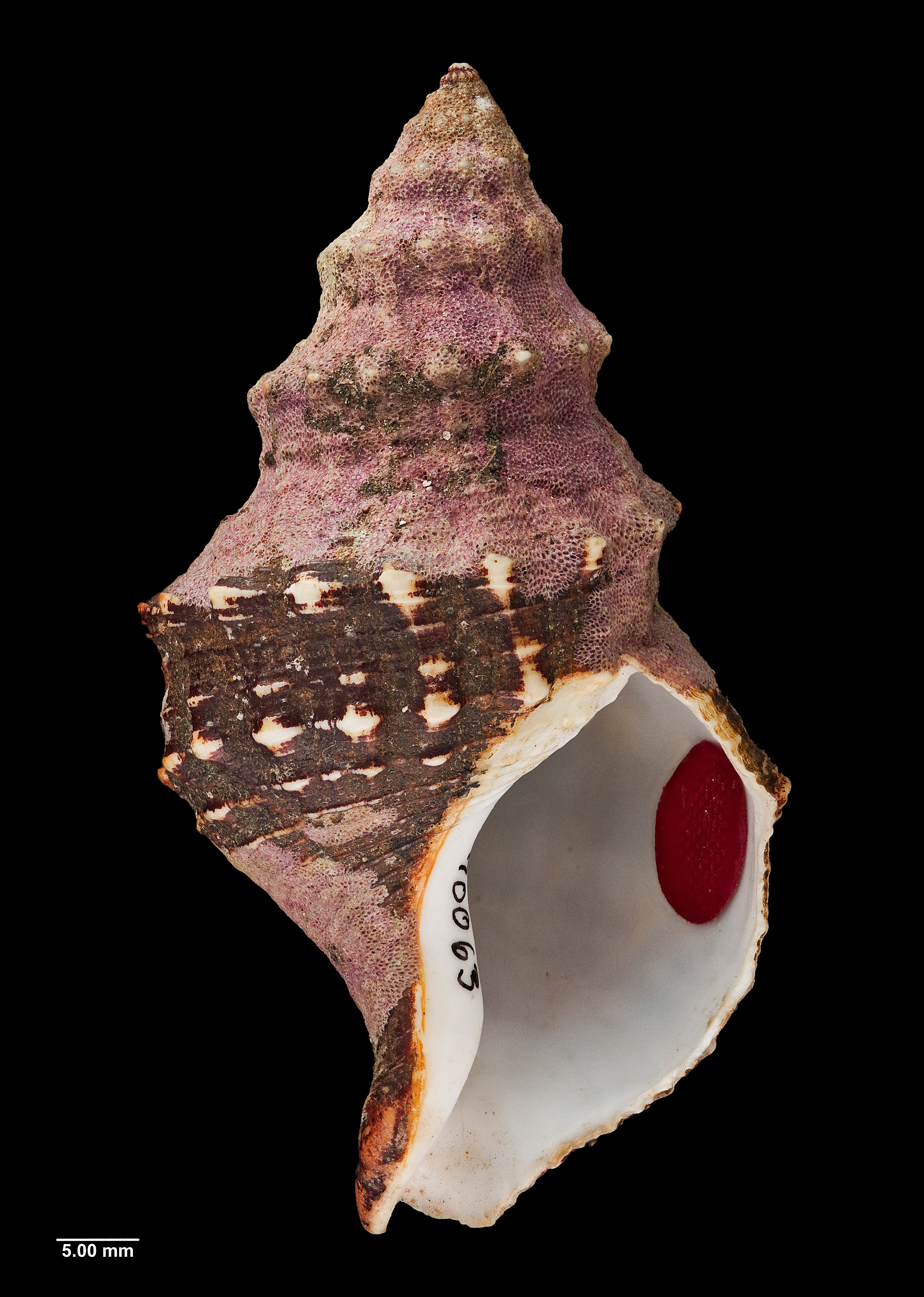

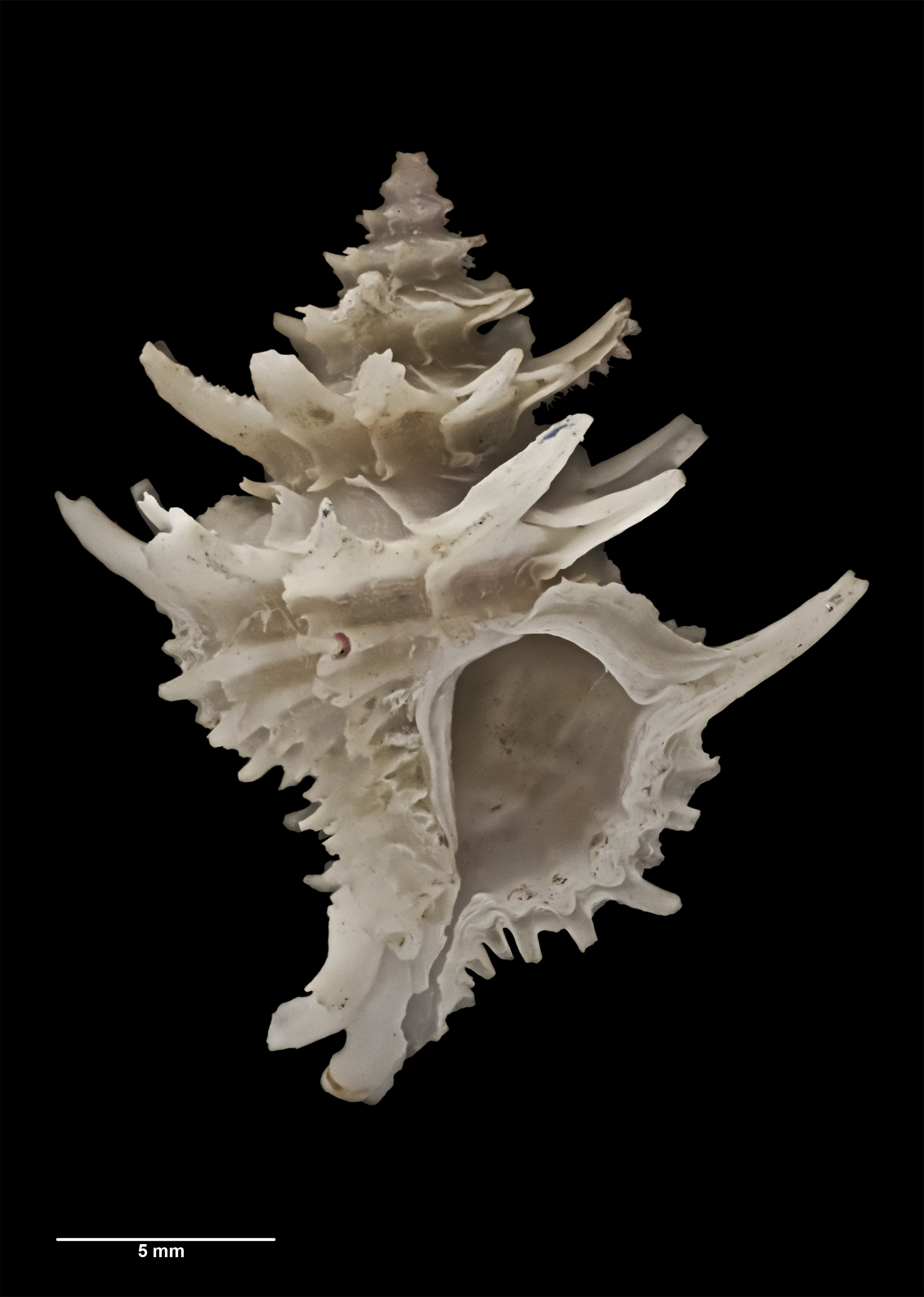

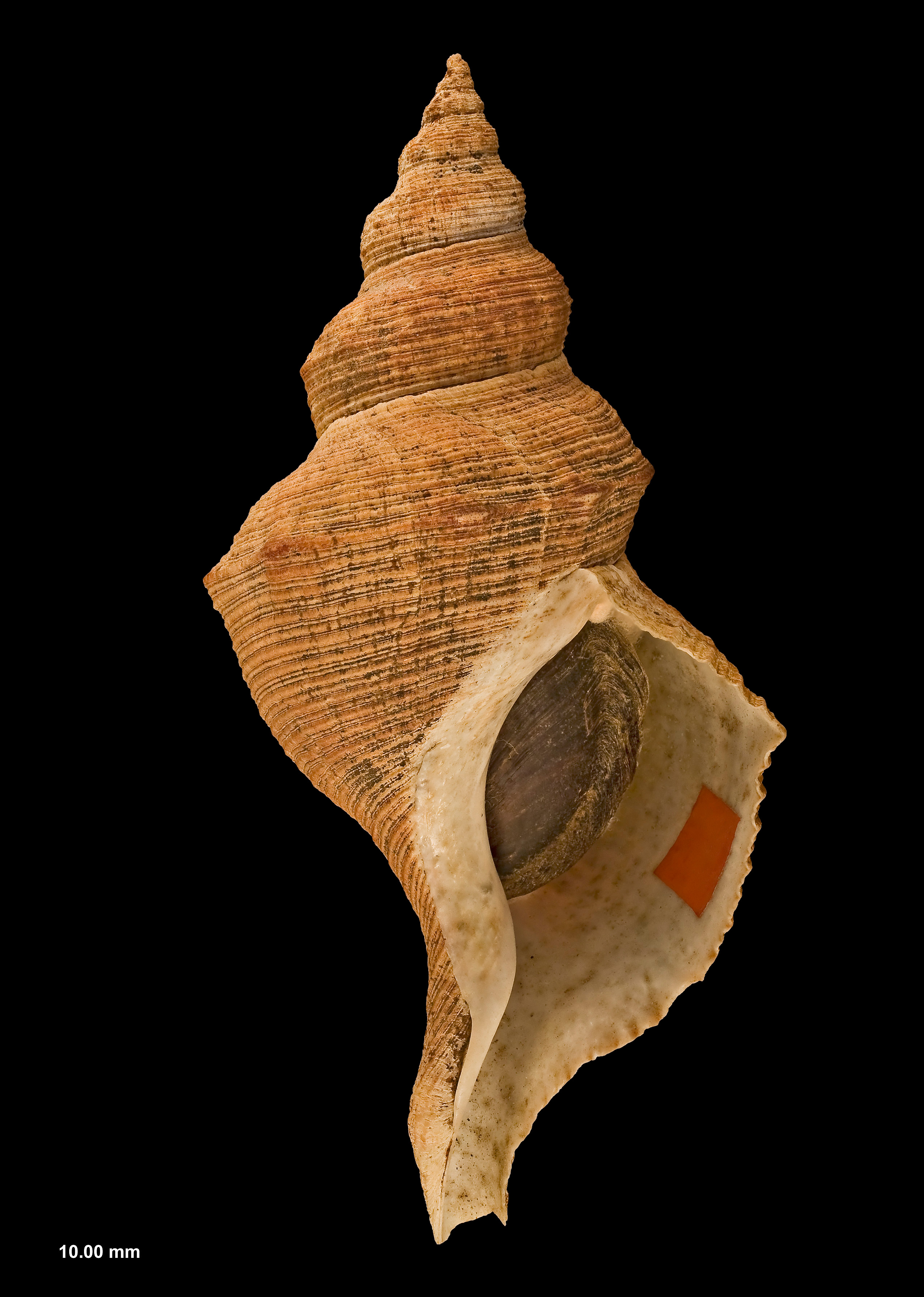

=== Human history ===
==== Applied Arts ====
Established in 1966, the museum's Applied Arts and Design collection includes ceramics, jewellery, furniture, glass, metalwork, costumes, textiles, costume accessories, musical instruments, horological objects and objets d'art from around the world. The collection numbers nearly 7,000 objects and represents key makers, manufacturers, designs, designers and technical developments and styles primarily of Auckland, but also of the Auckland region of New Zealand, and Western and Eastern cultures. The Applied Arts and Design department receives acquisition funds from the Charles Edgar Disney Art Trust, and has a number of loan collections including the Mackelvie Trust Collection. A collection of 7,000 objects from across Asia is displayed on rotation.

===== Mackelvie Collection =====
The museum has on loan all of the applied arts objects donated to the city of Auckland by James Tannock Mackelvie, a Glaswegian Scot who lived and worked in Auckland from 1865 to 1871. He accumulated wealth through land speculation and gold-mining investments prior to returning to London, and is regarded as one of Auckland's most significant arts benefactor. Mackelvie was a prolific collector and, from the beginning, assembled his acquisitions to one day serve as a teaching collection in New Zealand.

==== Castle Collection of musical instruments ====
A collection of more than 480 musical instruments was acquired in 1996 from Zillah and Ronald Castle. The Castle Collection contains "rare violins, an 18th-century harpsichord and an eclectic collection of instruments associated with New Zealand's pioneer days". The items in the collection "range over every imaginable un-powered device capable of producing music", and includes "workable examples of every member of the violin family, as well as didgeridoos, a zuffolo, harpsichords, a crwth, harps, tablas, a sáhn, horns, trumpets, clarinets, [and] a hurdy-gurdy".

==== Taonga Māori (Ethnology) ====
The museum houses a large collection of Māori and Pacific Island artefacts, including Hotunui, a large whare rūnanga (carved meeting house) built in 1878 at Thames, and Te Toki-a-Tapiri, a Māori war canoe from 1830 carved by Te Waaka Perohuka and Raharuhi Rukupō. Within New Zealand, the Taonga Māori collection is of equal significance to that of the national museum, Te Papa Tongarewa. It is a cultural and research resource of the first order, having the most comprehensive range of types and periods of material and is essential for the whole spectrum of studies in Māori art and material culture. The collection dates from the early decades of the founding of the museum; its focus has been on acquiring first-quality 'masterworks' from all tribal and geographic areas of New Zealand, as well as representative material-culture items. The museum's collection of ethnic musical instruments is the largest in the country, and is one of the most important in the world.

==== Pacific ====
The museum's comprehensive Pacific collection has a range of arts and material culture from tropical Polynesia, Melanesia and Micronesia. The collection is diverse both geographically and in type of material, covering all the cultures of the Pacific, from West Papua, north-east to Hawaii and south-east to Easter Island. Objects are collected for their intrinsic cultural or artistic importance, and also for their place within a temporal or geographic range by virtue of the relevance of their maker, who may be anonymous.

==== World Ethnology ====
The World (Foreign Ethnology) collection is the largest and most significant of its type in the country. It reflects a range of arts and artefacts of non-Western, -Pacific, and -Māori cultures, and portrays the diversity of world cultures, in particular that of South-east Asia, because of that area's "prehistoric links with Polynesian cultures and its contemporary regional political significance".

=== Research ===
The museum publishes two scholarly serials as part of its statutory role to advance and promote cultural and scientific scholarship and research. Papahou: Records of the Auckland Museum (named for a toi whakairo carved container, previously Records of Auckland Museum), (Note: JSTOR ISSN 00670464 & JSTOR ISSN 11749202.) has been regularly published since 1930, and contains results of original research on the museum collections and research by curatorial and other staff, and associates. New issues are published online and earlier issues are being digitised.

Papahou contain more than 450 articles written by over 150 different authors and co-authors dealing mostly with zoology, archaeology, ethnology, and botany. The articles contain important accounts of archaeological excavations and ethnographic objects, and descriptions of nearly 700 new taxa (mostly new animal species and subspecies).

The occasional Bulletin, which appears less often and usually contains results of larger research projects, has been published since 1941.

== War Memorial ==
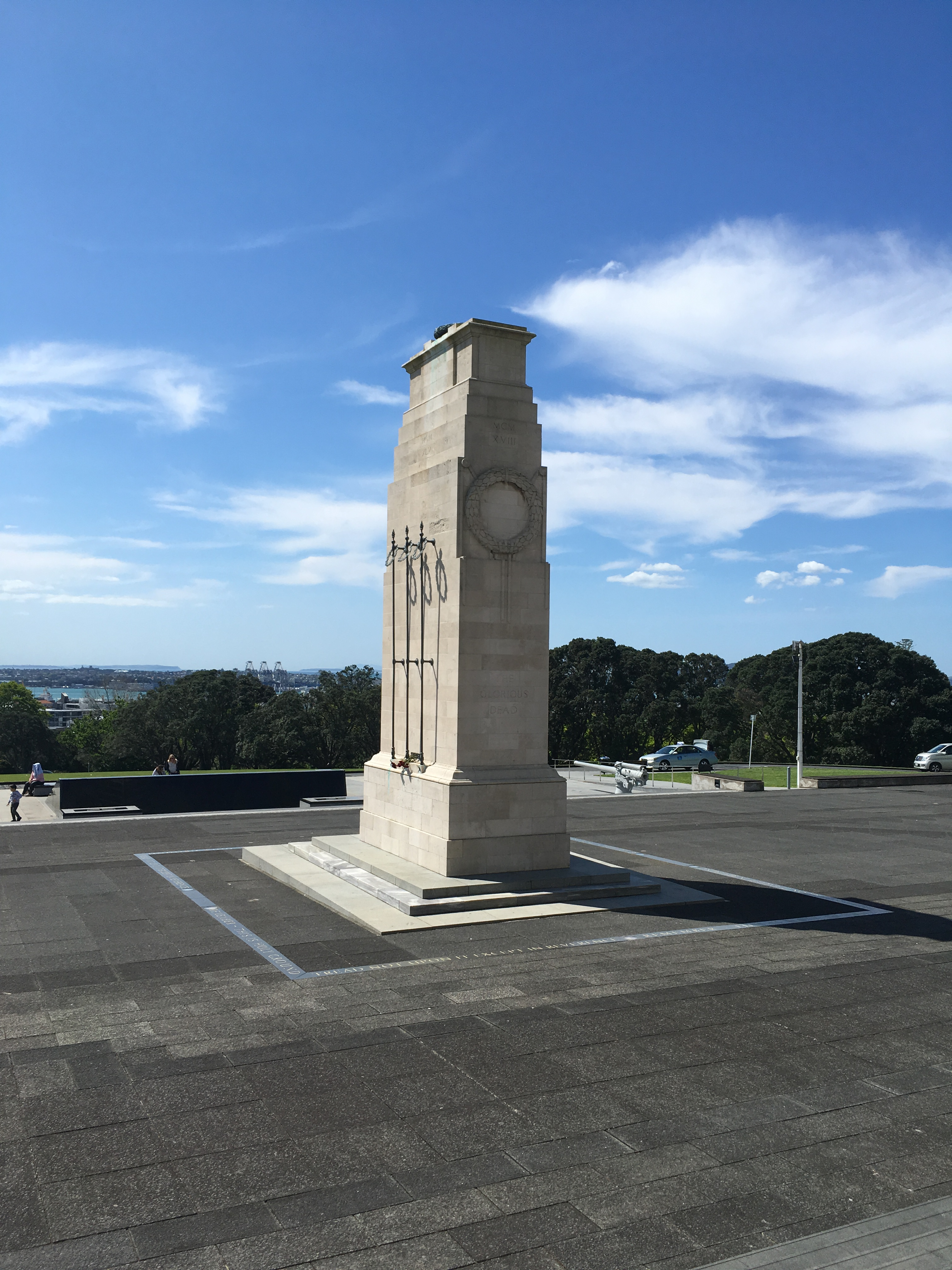
Cenotaph headstones

The museum has an extensive permanent exhibition, "Scars on the Heart", covering wars—including the New Zealand Wars and New Zealand's participation in overseas conflicts such as the First and Second World Wars; the Anglo-Boer War; conflicts such as the Korean and Vietnam Wars, and the country's role in UN Peacekeeping missions. This exhibition is linked to the War Memorial, and shows, for example, models of Māori pā (fortified settlements) and original Spitfire and Mitsubishi Zero aeroplanes. In November 2016, Pou Maumahara (Māori for 'post of remembrance'), a memorial enquiry centre, was established, and in 2017, the museum opened Pou Kanohi: New Zealand at War, a new permanent exhibition designed "to tell young people about the country's experiences of WWI".

Parts of the museum, as well as the Cenotaph and its surrounding consecrated grounds (Court of Honour) in front of the museum, also serve as a war memorial, mainly to those who lost their lives in the First and Second World Wars. There are two "Halls of Memory" within the museum, whose walls, together with a number of additional marble slabs, list the names of all known New Zealand soldiers from the Auckland Region killed in major conflicts during the 20th century.

RSA representatives have noted that the Cenotaph area is in need of renovation, and also would like measures put in place that ensure the area is treated with more respect by people using the park or visiting the museum. Auckland City was considering replacement the old concrete paving with granite and basalt pavers. This was apparently decided against, possibly for cost reasons. The city has however conducted substantial remedial works, to improve the condition of the existing Court of Honour, including repairs to and lighting of the steps, uplighting of the Cenotaph, as well as general cleaning and a new interpretive engraving provided by the Auckland RSA.

In early 2010, Auckland City Council started work in front of the Court of Honour, up to then taken up by a smaller car park. The area was changed to provide a new water feature, and walkways and other infrastructure were also upgraded. Work around the court was completed in mid-2010.

The museum hosts Online Cenotaph, an online biographical database of New Zealand service personnel which as of December 2025 holds searchable 265,000 records. Originally established in 1996 as a closed institutional database, the database was redeveloped in 2015 to incorporate crowdsourcing, allowing researchers and families to submit additional images and stories to records.

== Governance ==
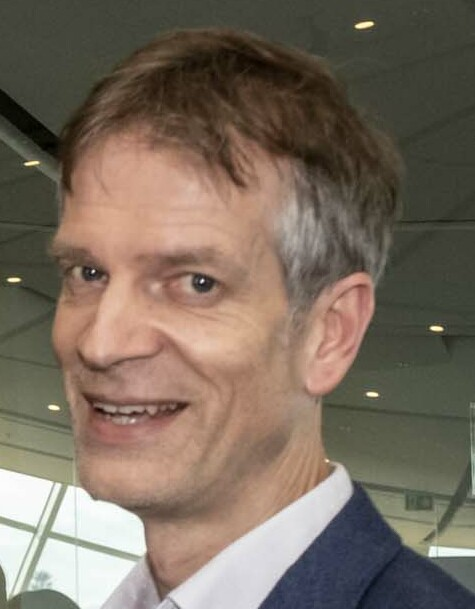
Roger Lins in 2023

The museum is governed by a trust board, and has an executive management team headed by a director. The board's duties, functions and powers, and its responsibilities to ten statutory objectives are set out in the Auckland War Memorial Museum Act 1996. Paramount amongst its responsibilities is the trusteeship and guardianship of the museum and its extensive collections of treasures and scientific materials.

The Act also tasks the board with the appointment of a Māori Committee of no less than five members, known as the Taumata-ā-Iwi. The Taumata-ā-Iwi is founded upon the principle of mana whenua (customary authority of and over ancestral land), and comprises Ngāti Whātua, Ngāti Pāoa and Tainui. The committee is "responsible for the provision of advice and assistance to the Trust Board in a series of matters as set out in the Act," including matters provided for in the Treaty of Waitangi. The Act further "empowers the Taumata-ā-Iwi to give advice on all matters of Māori protocol within the Museum and between the Museum and Māori people at large", codified in the committee's governance principles as "the right to advise".

The Auckland Museum Institute has a role in the governance of Auckland Museum by appointing four members to the Museum Trust Board. The institute was established in 1867 and is an independent voluntary run organisation. It is the Auckland branch of the Royal Society of New Zealand Te Apārangi and also does public outreach and education. Council members listed for 2022/2023 are: Dr Roger Lins (President), Marilyn Kohlhase (Vice President), Marguerite Durling, Phil Lascelles, Angela Lassig, Rae Nield, Daniel Pouwels, Alison Preston (Treasurer) and Moth Sutherland-Tupp.

=== Secretaries, curators and directors ===
- 1852–1857: John Alexander Smith
- 1857–1859: George Eliott Eliott
- 1859–1864: Elwin Brodie Dickson
- 1864–1865: E. Watkins
- 1865–1867: Thomas Francis Winstanley
- 1867–1869: Frederick Wollaston Hutton FGS
- 1869–1873: Thomas Kirk
- 1874–1923: Thomas Frederick Cheeseman
- 1924–1964: Sir Gilbert Archey CBE FRSNZ
- 1964–1979: Evan Graham Turbott QSO
- 1979–1993: Graham Stuart Park
- 1994–2007: Rodney Wilson CNZM
- 2007–2010: Vanda Vitali
- 2010–2011: Sir Don McKinnon ONZ GCVO
- 2011–2016: Roy Clare CBE
- 2017–2023: David Gaimster
- 2023–present: David Reeves

== Auckland Museum Medals ==
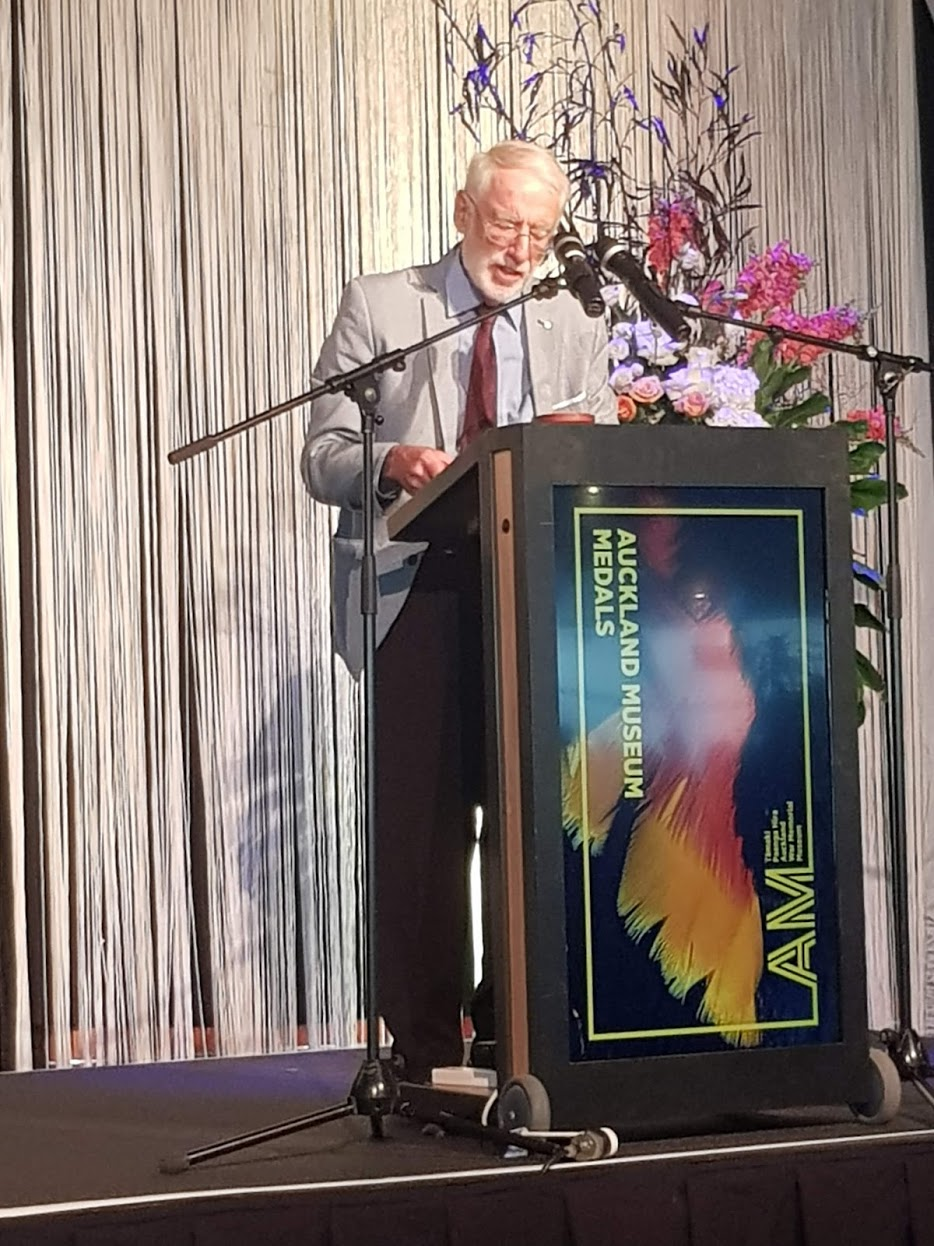
New Zealand botanist Mike D. Wilcox becoming an Associate Emeritus of Auckland War Memorial Museum in 2019

Since 1999, Auckland War Memorial Museum has regularly awarded the Auckland Museum Medals to recognise research and public service achievements. Recipients have included botanist Lucy Cranwell, historian and academic Ranginui Walker, artist Mary Ama and Ngāti Whātua paramount chief and academic Hugh Kāwharu.

== Controversies ==
=== Hillary estate ===
The papers and memorabilia of the late Sir Edmund Hillary, the first man to reach the summit of Mount Everest, are held in the museum. In 2009, the museum was involved in legal action with Hillary's children, Peter and Sarah Hillary, over publishing rights to his papers. New Zealand Prime Minister John Key offered to mediate, and his offer was accepted and the matter resolved amicably. In 2013 the Sir Edmund Hillary Archive was registered on the UNESCO New Zealand Memory of the World.

=== Vitali tenure ===
The appointment and activities of Vanda Vitali, a Canadian citizen who served as director from 2007 until her resignation in 2010, saw a number of disputed changes in the museum, with multiple staff members being made redundant, or having to reapply for their positions. The museum also charged a controversial "donation" for entry (while still claiming to provide free entry), despite a museum levy being part of the regional rates.

Vitali was roundly criticised for her actions by a number of former staff and public figures, such as editorialist Pat Booth, who accused her of downplaying the "War Memorial" element of the museum name and function, as well as by former finance head of the museum, Jon Cowan, who in a letter to the New Zealand Herald argued after her resignation that she was responsible for a significant fall in visitor numbers and visitor satisfaction during her tenure. He also claimed that these statistics had ceased to be published in the second year of Vitali's work at the museum, given the clear negative trends of her initial year.
