= Eunice Harriett Garlick =

New Zealand photographer

- Born: 15 February 1883; Mount Eden, Auckland, New Zealand
- Died: 17 March 1951 (aged 68); Auckland, New Zealand
- Other name: Una Garlick
- Occupation: Photographer

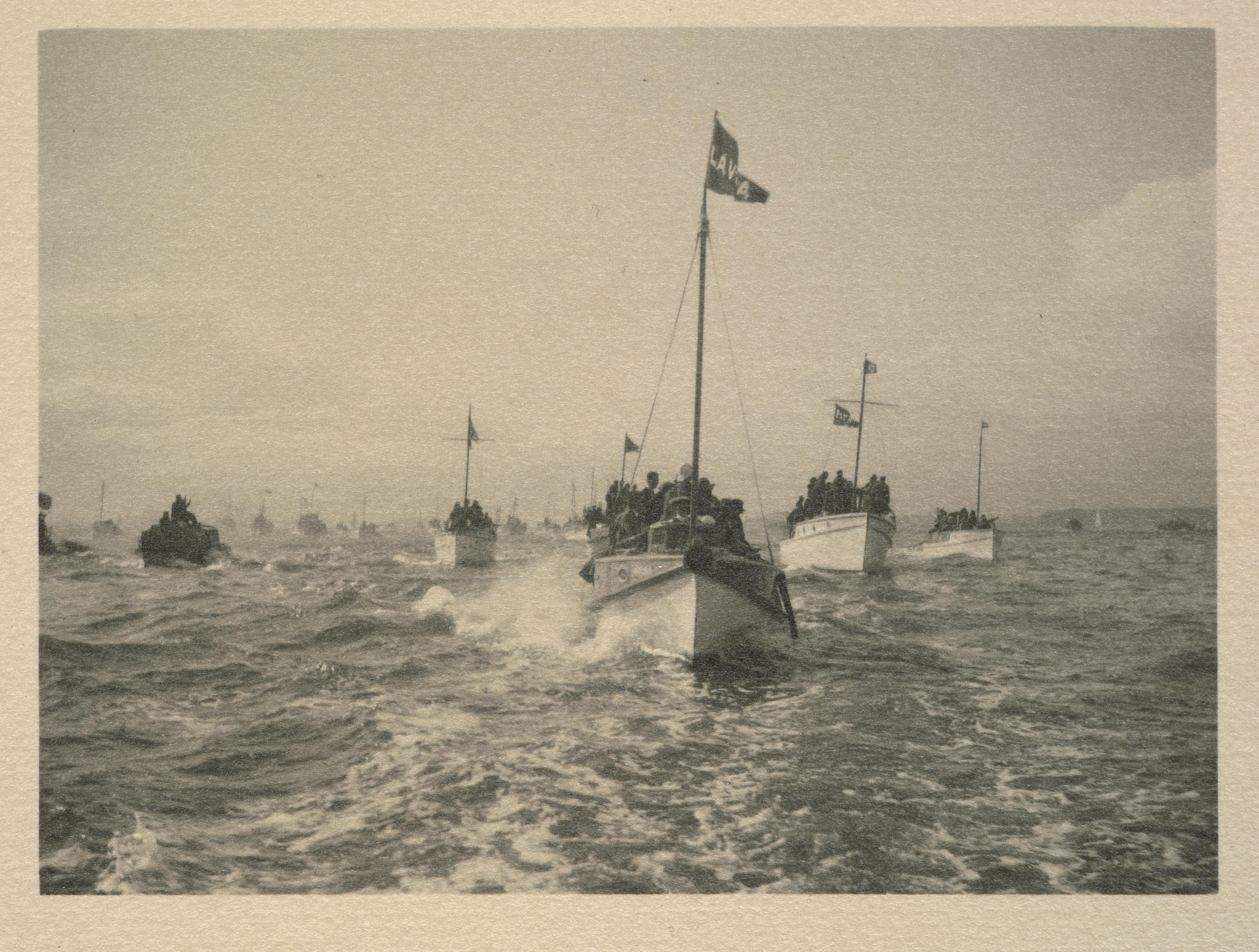
Pleasure craft welcoming the fleet, May 1924, Auckland, by Una Garlick. Purchased 1999 with New Zealand Lottery Grants Board funds. Te Papa (O.027298)

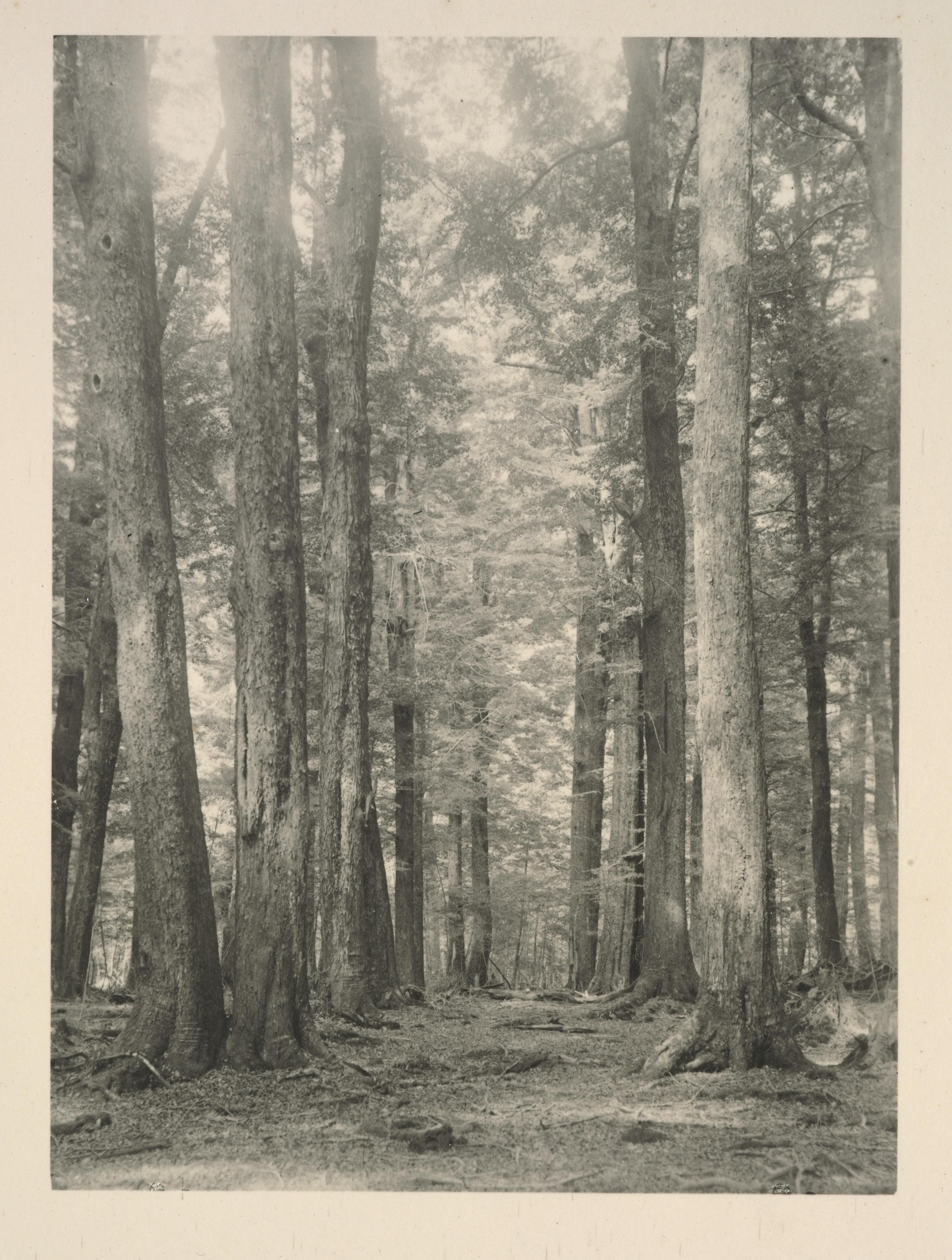
In the Birch forest, Paradise, Lake Wakatipu, circa 1924, Auckland, by Una Garlick. Purchased 1999 with New Zealand Lottery Grants Board funds. Te Papa (O.027301)

Eunice Harriett "Una" Garlick (15 February 1883–17 March 1951) was a New Zealand photographer, known for her pictorialism style--a movement stressing photography's role as art. Her subject matter was mainly concerned with landscapes and Māori studies. Her most notable work is a series of portraits depicting Maori women.

== Biography ==
Una Garlick was born in Mount Eden, Auckland in 1883 under the registered name of Harriett Eunice. Her parents, Richard Knight Garlick and Ellen Green, were both English-born and had ten children (Eunice was the seventh). Her father was a wealthy merchant, earning a living selling kauri-gum. From 1895 to 1900 Garlick attended Wanganui Girls’ College, where she may have learnt photography, and then returned home. As a result of her family's social position, she and her two other unmarried sisters (Florence and Hilda) were never required to work to support themselves.

Garlick created her first dark room at the original family home on Khyber Pass Road. Her first works consisted of recording personal events of friends and family members. As she gained experience, she took on small commissions and entered her work in exhibitions and competitions. Prize money and compensation for these small jobs were her sole earnings at the time. Most of her photographs followed the Pictorialist Movement, which led her to produce mostly landscapes, as well as some portrait series.

As her photography work expanded, Una became increasingly active in photographic societies. She was the first women to be nominated as a member of the Auckland Photographic Society (then the Auckland Camera Club) and officially became its first female member in July 1921. Her work was first exhibited in a club exhibition in 1923. Garlick's photo 'Home of the Gannets' was included in the annual review of world photography, Photograms of the Year 2026, selected by F. J. Mortimer (1874–1944), where it and a photogram by A. H. Hall were described as "excellent of their kind, and are satisfying from the pictorial and decorative point of view". In 1926 Garlick won the Auckland Photographic Society Association Medal for the most competition points and she became a committee member in 1927.

In that same year, she had one of her photographs selected for the Annual International Salon of Pictorial Photography in British Columbia, Canada and was one of three from New Zealand to have photographs in the International Exhibition of the London Salon of Photography. In 1928 she was included in an exhibition of overseas work at the Royal Photographic Society's headquarters which noted that it 'promised well for the future'. In 1928, another photo was selected for the Salon International D'Art Photographique held in Paris in 1929. Her work was also included in the Salzburg International Salon in 1929 where her 'Maori studies were much admired'. Garlick joined the Royal Photographic Society in 1940 and gained her Associateshio the same year She remained a member until her death.

Garlick took tours of the North Island and subsequently developed a photo series of the Maori women she visited. One of these became her most notable work, 'Guide Georgina', and was selected for the American Annual of Photography in 1930. In 1935, she spent time in England and was living there when World War II began.

Una Garlick died of cancer on March 17, 1951 (age 68) at her home in Ormonde Road, Remuera, Auckland.

== Selected works ==
- 1924-Pleasure craft welcoming the fleet, black-and-white photography, platinum process
- 1927-Guide Georgina from Whakarewarewa, Rotorua,
- 1927-Portrait Study of Guide Georgina, Fine New Zealand Paintings
- 1930-Rangitoto, Auckland Harbour 1930, 10x7.5cm
- 1930-Portrait, Tauranga, 102x72mm, silver gelatin print
- 1930-Georgina (from Maori Character Study), 100x73 mm, silver gelatin print

== External sources ==
- Works of Garlick are held in the collection of Auckland War Memorial Museum Tāmaki Paenga Hira
