= Online Cenotaph =

New Zealand online database of service people

- Website type: Online database
- Available in: English, Māori
- Headquarters: Auckland, New Zealand
- Owner: Auckland War Memorial Museum
- Website: www.aucklandmuseum.com/war-memorial/online-cenotaph
- Commercial: No
- Launched: December 1996; 29 years ago
- Current status: Active

Online Cenotaph is an online biographical database of New Zealand service personnel who served during conflicts. Operated by the Auckland War Memorial Museum, the database was originally launched in 1996. In 2015 for the centenary of the Gallipoli campaign, the database was relaunched to incorporate crowdsourced public contributions. As of December 2025, the database includes over 265,000 records of service people.

== Features and user community ==
Online Cenotaph is an online war memorial for New Zealand service personnel, which is searchable by name, place, troopship. Indenting to create both a military record and a social history record, Online Cenotaph records feature primary sources including military embarkation rolls, New Zealand Defence Force personnel files and secondary research, including public contributions. Supplementary information is added to entries from sources including Births Deaths and Marriages, the New Zealand Electronic Text Centre, arcchival newspapers, and district council cemetery records. Additionally, members of the public are able to submit correction requests through the website. Other features of Online Cenotaph include digital remembrance poppies, which can be lain on a service person's record, and Cenotaph Stories, articles that highlight lesser known stories of figures within the database.

Since 2016, Online Cenotaph has been housed at Pou Maumahara, the Memorial Discovery Centre at Auckland War Memorial Museum. Stories relating to Online Cenotaph entries are displayed in the centre. More than 160 museum volunteers have contributed to Online Cenotaph over the years, either online or on-site at Pou Maumahara.

The most common users of Online Cenotaph are family history researchers. The user community is composed of family members or descendants who contribute personal narratives and images, researchers, educators and students, as well as genealogists and amateur historians.

== History ==
=== Establishment ===
The Cenotaph database was first established in 1996. The project was established due to the passing of the Auckland War Memorial Museum Act 1996, which renewed the museum's commitment to its role as a war memorial. Established to allow researchers, veterans and family members to explore the records and stories of service personnel from World War I and World War II, the database was created by the information services section of the museum research library for the armory, originally as a basic textual Roll of Honour. Data entry began for the project in June 1996, with the database being launched in December 1996, during the opening of Auckland War Memorial Museum's Armoury Resource Centre. At launch, the database included 16,750 entries.

In 1998, Cenotaph won the 3M Award for Innovation by New Zealand Library Association. By 1999, the database had been expanded to include entries for personnel who served during other armed conflicts, including the South African War, Indonesia–Malaysia confrontation, Malayan Emergency, Korean War, Vietnam War, Falklands War and peacekeeping missions. In the 1990s, Kitbag, a second, parallel database was established, which focused on collecting records of service people who were still alive and had restricted access, only available to library and armoury staff.

The database became accessible online from October 2005, and in 2013, the Auckland Council began linking to Cenotaph in its War Memorials and Honour Boards Database to enrich content. In May 2014, the first Cenotaph-specific roles were created at museum, including the Online Cenotaph collection manager role, held by Victoria Passau.

Prior to 2015, the database was known as either Cenotaph or Cenotaph Database.

=== 2015 relaunch ===
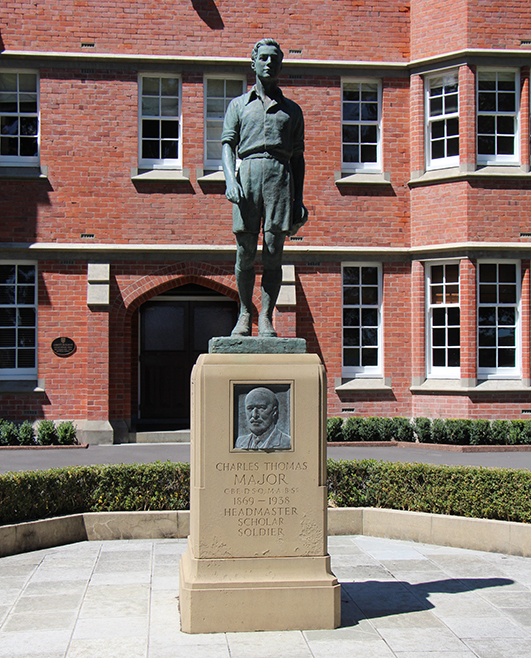
A volunteer-submitted image to Online Cenotaph: image of the statue to Charles Thomas Major at King's College, Auckland

In April 2015 to mark the centenary of the Gallipoli campaign, Online Cenotaph was relaunched as dynamic digital memorial, having previously been a closed institutional record. The first crowdsourcing project instigated by Auckland War Memorial Museum, the website became open to community submissions after extended requests from communities and families over years to add additional information and resources to records. In 2014, the crowdsourcing platform was originally intended to be a separate service named Cenotaph Community. In its first year, the relaunched Online Cenotaph attracted between 150,000 and 200,000 monthly views.

At the same time, a mobile kiosk was developed for Online Cenotaph named He Pou Aroha, where people could bring documents and ephemera to be uploaded to Online Cenotaph. The kiosk travelled across the country.

From October 2015, Online Cenotaph began collaborating with the University of Minnesota on the Measuring the Anzacs project, investigating long-term health outcomes of New Zealand service personnel, by enlisting volunteers to transcribe medical records from World War I.

On 21 October 2016, Online Cenotaph's physical location was moved to Pou Maumahara, the Memorial Discovery Centre at Auckland War Memorial Museum. Online Cenotaph won the Project Award at the ServiceIQ New Zealand Museum Awards in 2019.

=== Recent developments ===
In 2020 during the lockdowns for the COVID-19 pandemic in New Zealand, digital volunteers, of whom included museum volunteers and visitor hosts, worked on transcription projects, including archival documents, memorial plaques and headstones, leading to the creation of over 15,000 new cenotaph records. In 2020 for Te Wiki o te Reo Māori, Online Cenotaph launched a Māori language version of the database interface. From 2020 to 2021, Online Cenotaph collaborated with Archives New Zealand, who allowed collection technician Dan Millar access to the archives in Wellington, allowing Millar to digitise over 200 archival sources to add to Online Cenotaph records. Online Cenotaph volunteer Marguerite Durling became an Associate Emerita of Auckland War Memorial Museum at the Auckland Museum Medals in 2021, in recognition of her work to help transcribe documents for the database.

As of December 2025, over 265,000 service people have Online Cenotaph records.
