= Te Waaka Perohuka =

New Zealand Maori carver

Te Waaka Perohuka (fl. 1843–1851) was a New Zealand Māori tohunga and carver. He was one of the prominent leaders of the Rongowhakaata iwi during the early stages of European colonisation in the 1800s.

Some of his most famous carvings was the Te Toki-a-Tāpiri war canoe in 1840, which is displayed in the Auckland War Memorial Museum, and the carvings inside the Toko Toru Tapu Church in Manutuke near Gisborne.
