= John Alexander Smith (curator) =

English-born New Zealand businessman and museum director

- Born: 1813 or 1814; England
- Died: 13 June 1889; Napier, New Zealand
- Occupations: Businessman, museum director, councillor

John Alexander Smith (1813 or 1814 – 13 June 1889) was an early figure in colonial New Zealand. Setting up one of the earliest stores in Auckland, he established the Auckland Museum in 1852. After leaving for Napier, Smith was a member of the Hawke's Bay Provincial Council from 1863 to 1867 and 1875–1876. In Napier, Smith was known as a philanthropist, funding the Napier Hospital.

== Biography ==
Smith was born in England around the year 1814. Little is known about his early life, other than being employed for the East India Merchant Service. He arrived in Auckland in 1841 as a merchant. The first print reference to Smith in New Zealand is from July 1841, advertising his bonded store on Fort Street, then the foreshore of Commercial Bay on the Auckland waterfront. Smith opened a second store in October 1846 in Lower Queen Street, which he referred to as the iron store. Smith was known as an entrepreneur, chandler, commission agent, and supplier of goods including tobacco and blankets. Smith also set up a soap and candle factory, and experimented with flaxmaking and dye extraction.

Smith coordinated the New Zealand exhibit at the 1851 Great Exhibition in London. The New Zealand exhibit primarily featured natural materials, including flax rope, soap, minerals, building materials and kauri gum, but also included a beeswax model of a pā and a papa raukura (traditional Māori box for treasured items). His experiences at the Great Exhibition inspired Smith to set up the Auckland Museum, although the pieces from the exhibition did not make up any of the early museum collections. The museum was opened by Smith in October 1852, in a farmhouse on Grafton Road (now a part of the University of Auckland campus). He added to the museum's collections by instigating a wide-scale letter writing campaign, asking figures from New Zealand and abroad to donate items for the institution. Smith repeatedly tried to find a more secure location for the museum, however was unable to. He left Auckland for Napier in 1857, after which the museum was left in a state of disrepair until it was adopted by the Auckland Institute in 1869.

He became a member of the Hawke's Bay Provincial Council from 1863 to 1867. During his time in Napier, Smith was known as a philanthropist. He funded the Napier Hospital, and was made the honorary patron of the building. His oil painting hung in the hospital until the 1931 Hawke's Bay earthquake, when the hospital suffered major damage.

Smith's wife died in 1869, after which he spent time in England, promoting New Zealand to potential new colonists. He once again served on the Hawke's Bay Provincial Council from 1875 to 1876.

Smith died in Napier on 13 June 1889, aged 75. He was buried in the old Napier cemetery.

== Personal life ==
Smith married Elizabeth Kinnear at St Paul's Church in Auckland on 7 May 1842. They had no children together. Elizabeth died in 1869.
