= John Nicol Crombie =

New Zealand photographer and businessman

- Born: 11 August 1827; Glasgow, Lanarkshire, Scotland
- Died: 1878 (aged 50–51)
- Occupations: Photographer, businessman
- Known for: Early photography studios in New Zealand; advertising as "Photographer to His Excellency"

John Nicol Crombie (11 August 1827–1878) was a New Zealand photographer and businessman. He was born in Glasgow, Lanarkshire, Scotland on 11 August 1827. Aiding his success and business was his constant advertising, describing himself as 'Photographer to his Excellency' and his studios as the 'Royal Photographic Gallery.'

Crombie emigrated to Melbourne, Australia in 1852. He was employed by the Meade Brothers in their photographic studio after failing to find employment as his chosen profession of engineering. After gaining experience there he moved to Auckland, New Zealand in 1855 where he opened his own photography studio. He ran a successful business and claimed he took over 1,000 portraits in both Auckland and Nelson in a two-year period. He took one of the first sets of portraits of Māori, including Īhaka Takaanini of Te Ākitai Waiohua.
