= List of members of the Ordre des Arts et des Lettres =

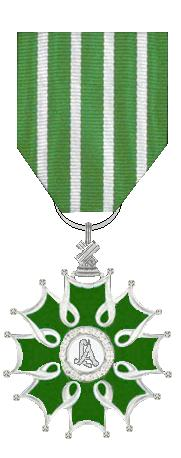
Insignia of Chevalier

This is a partial list of members of the Ordre des Arts et des Lettres of France.

== Members of the Order ==
=== Commandeur ===
Name	Rank	Year
T. S. Eliot	Commandeur	1960
Jorge Luis Borges	Commandeur	1962
Victoria Ocampo	Commandeur	1962
Elisabeth Söderström	Commandeur	1973
Marcel Marceau	Commandeur	1978
Stevie Wonder	Commandeur	1981
Jerry Lewis	Commandeur	1984
Zoran Mušič	Commandeur	1984
Akira Kurosawa	Commandeur	1985
Yasuo Mizui	Commandeur	1985
Mrinal Sen	Commandeur	1985
Josef Tal	Commandeur	1985
Moritz de Hadeln	Commandeur	1986
Salvatore Adamo	Commandeur	1987
Sean Connery	Commandeur	1987
Audrey Hepburn	Commandeur	1987
Fairuz	Commandeur	1988
Peter O'Toole	Commandeur	1988
Mercedes Sosa	Commandeur	1989
Dirk Bogarde	Commandeur	1990
Bob Dylan	Commandeur	1990
Nadine Gordimer	Commandeur	1991
Tarek Ali Hassan	Commandeur	1991
Clint Eastwood	Commandeur	1994
Mortimer Zuckerman	Commandeur	1994
Lauren Bacall	Commandeur	1995
Dustin Hoffman	Commandeur	1995
Marilyn Horne	Commandeur	1995
María Félix	Commandeur	1996
Seamus Heaney	Commandeur	1996
Lester James Peries	Commandeur	1997
Paul Mauriat	Commandeur	1997
David Bowie	Commandeur	1999
Sharmila Tagore	Commandeur	1999
Soumitra Chatterjee	Commandeur	1999
Salman Rushdie	Commandeur	1999
Rustam Ibragimbekov	Commandeur	2000 (renounced in 2012)
Václav Havel	Commandeur	2001
Maryse Condé	Commandeur	2001
David Stratton	Commandeur	2001
Barbara Wright	Commandeur	2002
Siddiq Barmak	Commandeur	2003
Adoor Gopalakrishnan	Commandeur	2003
Alexis Rosenberg-Redé	Commandeur	2003
Meryl Streep	Commandeur	2003
Julian Barnes	Commandeur	2004
Jin Yong	Commandeur	2004
Leonardo DiCaprio	Commandeur	2005
Patti Smith	Commandeur	2005
Max Roach	Commandeur	1989
Christoph Eschenbach	Commandeur	2006
Axelle Red	Commandeur	2006
Nan Goldin	Commandeur	2006
Paul Auster	Commandeur	2007
Ray Bradbury	Commandeur	2007
Lucien Clergue	Commandeur	2007
Emir Kusturica	Commandeur	2007
June Anderson	Commandeur	2008
Roger Moore	Commandeur	2008
Richard Serra	Commandeur	2008
Nikos Papatakis	Commandeur	2009
Thom Mayne	Commandeur	2009
Michael Haneke	Commandeur	2010
Takeshi Kitano	Commandeur	2010
Jean-Marie Klinkenberg	Commandeur	2010
Michael Caine	Commandeur	2011
Myung-Whun Chung	Commandeur	2011
Anish Kapoor	Commandeur	2011
Christopher Lee	Commandeur	2011
Jean van Hamme	Commandeur	2011
Anne Sofie von Otter	Commandeur	2011
Douglas Gordon	Commandeur	2012
Israel Horovitz	Commandeur	2012
Donald Sutherland	Commandeur	2012
Bono	Commandeur	2013
David Cairns	Commandeur	2013
William Kentridge	Commandeur	2013
Ringo Starr	Commandeur	2013
Bruce Willis	Commandeur	2013
Kar-Wai Wong	Commandeur	2013
Isabelle Adjani	Commandeur	2014
Charles Berling	Commandeur	2014
Catherine Breillat	Commandeur	2014
Xavier Darcos	Commandeur	2014
Brigitte Fontaine	Commandeur	2014
Jacques Higelin	Commandeur	2014
Marlène Jobert	Commandeur	2014
Quincy Jones	Commandeur	2014
Pierre Perret	Commandeur	2014
Juliette Gréco	Commandeur	2016
Eric Clapton	Commandeur	2017
Iggy Pop	Commandeur	2017
Vangelis Papathanassiou	Commandeur	2017
John Mordler	Commandeur	2017
Fujiko Nakaya	Commandeur	2017
Roger Corman	Commandeur	2017
Leo Brouwer	Commandeur	2018
Alejandro G. Iñarritu	Commandeur	2019
Catherine Jacob	Commandeur	2019
Nathalie Stutzmann	Commandeur	2020
Jennifer Flay	Commandeur	2020
Emma Lavigne	Commandeur	2020
Jean Paul Gaultier	Commandeur	2024
Joann Sfar	Commandeur	2024
Oliver Stone	Commandeur	2024
Michel Fugain	Commandeur	2025
Véronique Sanson	Commandeur	2025
Park Chan-wook	Commandeur	2026
Werner Herzog	Commandeur	2026

=== Officier ===
Name	Rank	Year
Rouben Melik	Officier	1963
Francisco Brennand	Officier	1985
Lynn Chadwick	Officier	1985
Nicholas Snowman	Officier	1985
Dexter Gordon	Officier	1986
Marie-Madeleine Duruflé	Officier	1987
Jeanne Moreau	Officier	1988
Leonard Jacobson	Officier	1989
Patricia Highsmith	Officier	1990
Richard Miller	Officier	1990
Susannah York	Officier	1991
Mimmo Rotella	Officier	1992
Elton John	Officier	1993
Edmund White	Officier	1993
Maria Ilva Biolcati	Officier	1995
Mark Podwal	Officier	1995
Neil Jordan	Officier	1996
Van Morrison	Officier	1996
Kenji Ekuan	Officier	1997
Frederica von Stade	Officier	1998
D. Kern Holoman	Officier	1999
Jean-Pierre Balpe	Officier	2000
Anne-Marie Duguet	Officier	2000
Douglas Messerli	Officier	2000
Chou Wen-Chung	Officier	2001
Edgar Munhall	Officier	2001
Ted Nelson	Officier	2001
Bruno Campanella	Officier	2002
Mirka Mora	Officier	2002
Danielle Steel	Officier	2002
W. D. Amaradeva	Officier	2003
Mahasweta Devi	Officier	2003
Ram Kumar	Officier	2003
Richard Foreman	Officier	2004
Jacques Israelievitch	Officier	2004
Constantine Andreou	Officier	2005
Daria Galateria	Officier	2005
Sharon Stone	Officier	2005
Ahmed El Maanouni	Officier	2007
Shah Rukh Khan	Officier	2007
Bill Cunningham	Officier	2008
Ambeth Ocampo	Officier	2008
Harold Prince	Officier	2008
Goran Paskaljević	Officier	2008
Donovan Leitch	Officier	2009
Edmund Cheng	Officier	2009
Peter Garrett	Officier	2009
David Liebman	Officier	2009
Johnnie To	Officier	2009
Ryuichi Sakamoto	Officier	2009
Colin B. Bailey	Officier	2010
Tim Burton	Officier	2010
Bill T. Jones	Officier	2010
Yoram Kaniuk	Officier	2011
Faye Dunaway	Officier	2011
Jim Jarmusch	Officier	2011
Jeong-Hee Yoon	Officier	2011
Gerald M. Ackerman	Officier	2012
Emmanuelle Béart	Officier	2012
Hans Silvester	Officier	2012
Ezza Agha Malak	Officier	2012
Goran Marković	Officier	2012
Gary Tinterow	Officier	2012
Christine Angot	Officier	2013
Thierry Frémont	Officier	2013
Guillaume Gallienne	Officier	2013
Terry Gilliam	Officier	2013
Lang Lang	Officier	2013
Henri Morvan & Yvon Morvan	Officier	2013
Ajda Pekkan	Officier	2013
Nansun Shi	Officier	2013
Anne Alvaro	Officier	2014
Yves Angelo	Officier	2014
Geneviève Brisac	Officier	2014
Bertrand Burgalat	Officier	2014
Tchéky Karyo	Officier	2014
Diane Kruger	Officier	2014
Chantal Lauby	Officier	2014
Philippe Lioret	Officier	2014
Philippe Manoury	Officier	2014
Gérard Manset	Officier	2014
Radu Mihăileanu	Officier	2014
Andrés Neumann	Officier	2014
Katsuhiro Otomo	Officier	2014
Chantal Pontbriand	Officier	2014
Joann Sfar	Officier	2014
Laurent Stocker	Officier	2014
Christophe Looten	Officier	2015
John Adams	Officier	2015
Isao Takahata	Officier	2015
Marion Cotillard	Officier	2016
Michael Keaton	Officier	2016
Lee Bul	Officier	2016
Pharrell Williams	Officier	2017
Jeff Mills	Officier	2017
Guy Berthiaume	Officier	2017
John Waters	Officier	2018
Anna Parzymies	Officier	2018
Ann Philbin	Officier	2018
Kim Jee-woon	Officier	2018
Esther Mahlangu	Officier	2019
Sjón (Sigurjón Birgir Sigurðsson)	Officier	2020
Zazie de Truchis de Varennes	Officier	2021
Donald Adamson	Officier	2022
Phil Comeau	Officier	2022
Dominique Mercy	Officier	2022
Howard A. Rodman	Officier	2023
Barthélémy Toguo	Officier	2023
Anggun	Officier	2026

=== Chevalier ===
Name	Rank	Year
Sōfū Teshigahara	Chevalier	1961
Stanley William Hayter	Chevalier	1967
Muhammad Shahidullah	Chevalier	1967
Aleksandar Petrovic	Chevalier	1969
Denise Colomb	Chevalier	1981
Janine Niépce	Chevalier	1981
Dirk Bogarde	Chevalier	1982
Fernanda Montenegro	Chevalier	1983
William S. Burroughs	Chevalier	1984
Dado	Chevalier	1984
K.R.H. Sonderborg	Chevalier	1984
Brian Ferneyhough	Chevalier	1984
David Niles	Chevalier	1984
Claude Evrard	Chevalier	1984
Harrison Birtwistle	Chevalier	1986
Paul Goma	Chevalier	1986
Andrés Neumann	Chevalier	1986
Atahualpa Yupanqui	Chevalier	1986
Gabrielle Démians d'Archimbaud	Chevalier	1989
Max Mathews	Chevalier	1989
Susana Rinaldi	Chevalier	1989
Wahbi al-Hariri	Chevalier	1990
Wojciech Lesnikowski	Chevalier	1990
Richard Miller	Chevalier	1990
Muthuswamy Pillai	Chevalier	1990
Vaclav Bostik	Chevalier	1991
Howard Buten	Chevalier	1991
Guruh Sukarnoputra	Chevalier	1991
Gabriel Liiceanu	Chevalier	1992
Rudolf Nureyev	Chevalier	1992
Jean Roba	Chevalier	1992
Akiko Ebi	Chevalier	1993
Colin B. Bailey	Chevalier	1994
Dương Thu Hương	Chevalier	1994
David Copperfield	Chevalier	1994
Yohji Yamamoto	Chevalier	1994
Sivaji Ganesan	Chevalier	1995
Philip Glass	Chevalier	1995
Anne d'Harnoncourt	Chevalier	1995
Gabriel P. Weisberg	Chevalier	1995
Alexandru Zub	Chevalier	1995
Tina Turner	Chevalier	1996
Hiroshi Teshigahara	Chevalier	1996
Kuo Pao Kun	Chevalier	1996
Sherrill Milnes	Chevalier	1996
John Ralston Saul	Chevalier	1996
Héctor Tizón	Chevalier	1996
David Bradby	Chevalier	1997
Ion Caramitru	Chevalier	1997
Jean-Daniel Lorieux	Chevalier	1997
Jacques Pépin	Chevalier	1997
Evert Endt	Chevalier	1998
Kazuo Ishiguro	Chevalier	1998
M. Mukundan	Chevalier	1998
Tom Schnabel	Chevalier	1998
Tereza Kesovija	Chevalier	1999
Shaji N.Karun	Chevalier	1999
Hedda Sterne	Chevalier	1999
Linda Shelton	Chevalier	1999
Jean-Charles Ablitzer	Chevalier	2000
Maurice Benayoun	Chevalier	2000
Ivor Forbes Guest	Chevalier	2000
John Hsu	Chevalier	2000
Michiyasu Itsutsuji	Chevalier	2000
Cyprien Katsaris	Chevalier	2000
Michael Kenna	Chevalier	2000
Jean-Luc Leguay	Chevalier	2000
Christophe Looten	Chevalier	2000
Kun-Woo Paik	Chevalier	2000
Giuseppe Scaraffia	Chevalier	2000
James Welch	Chevalier	2000
Robyn Archer	Chevalier	2001
Michael Cimino	Chevalier	2001
A. Craig Copetas	Chevalier	2001
Elfi von Dassanowsky	Chevalier	2001
Patrick Delcroix	Chevalier	2001
Graham Leggat	Chevalier	2001
Michael Jarrell	Chevalier	2001
Yoel Levi	Chevalier	2001
Blanca Varela	Chevalier	2001
Garou	Chevalier	2002
Arno Hintjens	Chevalier	2002
Bruce Jackson	Chevalier	2002
Leo Schofield	Chevalier	2002
Andrea Stretton	Chevalier	2002
Deborah Voigt	Chevalier	2002
Paul Holdengräber	Chevalier	2003
Pierre Michelot	Chevalier	2003
Gary Tinterow	Chevalier	2003
Li Ang	Chevalier	2004
Quentin Blake	Chevalier	2004
Jonathan Coe	Chevalier	2004
Declan Donnellan	Chevalier	2004
Bruce Goldstein	Chevalier	2004
Lyudmila Ulitskaya	Chevalier	2004
Alarmel Valli	Chevalier	2004
Roger Woodward	Chevalier	2004
M. Balamuralikrishna	Chevalier	2005
Thomas Bangalter	Chevalier	2005 (renounced in 2010)
Alessandro Barbero	Chevalier	2005
Jean-Luc Darbellay	Chevalier	2005
Guy-Manuel de Homem-Christo	Chevalier	2005 (renounced in 2010)
Jun Itami	Chevalier	2005
Alexandra Lapierre	Chevalier	2005
Estela Medina	Chevalier	2005
Peter Phillips	Chevalier	2005
Frédéric Sanchez	Chevalier	2005
Serge Sorokko	Chevalier	2005
Marina Tchebourkina	Chevalier	2005
Michel Ancel	Chevalier	2006
Phil Comeau	Chevalier	2006
Gad Elmaleh	Chevalier	2006
Robert Fox	Chevalier	2006
Susan Graham	Chevalier	2006
Juanes	Chevalier	2006
Marusya Klimova	Chevalier	2006
Grethe Krogh	Chevalier	2006
Amanda Lear	Chevalier	2006
Shigeru Miyamoto	Chevalier	2006
Ernesto Neto	Chevalier	2006
Frédérick Raynal	Chevalier	2006
Ralph Regenvanu	Chevalier	2006
Ned Rorem	Chevalier	2006
Uma Thurman	Chevalier	2006
Nikolay Tsiskaridze	Chevalier	2006
Vanda Vitali	Chevalier	2006
George Clooney	Chevalier	2007
Clotilde Courau	Chevalier	2007
Jude Law	Chevalier	2007
Allan Massie	Chevalier	2007
Michael Matthes	Chevalier	2007
Peter Molyneux	Chevalier	2007
Shahram Nazeri	Chevalier	2007
Vanessa Paradis	Chevalier	2007
Malcolm Rogers	Chevalier	2007
Mónica Velásquez	Chevalier	2007
Yip Wing-sie	Chevalier	2007
Maria Teresa Cabré	Chevalier	2008
Nandita Das	Chevalier	2008
Kylie Minogue	Chevalier	2008
Michael Rosen	Chevalier	2008
China Zorrilla	Chevalier	2008
Eleanor Heartney	Chevalier	2008
Do-yeon Jeon	Chevalier	2009
Stacey Kent	Chevalier	2009
Olivier Meslay	Chevalier	2009
Youn Sun Nah	Chevalier	2009
Ron Radford	Chevalier	2009
André Rieu	Chevalier	2009
Graham Robb	Chevalier	2009
Shan Sa	Chevalier	2009
Ros Schwartz	Chevalier	2009
Rory J Thomas	Chevalier	2010
Ron Burnett	Chevalier	2010
Tim Burton	Chevalier	2010
Jaz Coleman	Chevalier	2010
Philip Gourevitch	Chevalier	2010
Wendy Guerra	Chevalier	2010
Raphael Nadjari	Chevalier	2010
Michael Penniman	Chevalier	2010
Elif Shafak	Chevalier	2010
Maria Schneider	Chevalier	2010
Wang Xiaoshuai	Chevalier	2010
Fawzi Zayadine	Chevalier	2010
Alice Munro	Chevalier	2010
Maxwell L. Anderson	Chevalier	2011
AA Bronson	Chevalier	2011
Isabelle Dhordain	Chevalier	2011
Lourdes Espínola	Chevalier	2011
Erika Greenberg-Schneider	Chevalier	2011
Linden Tsai-Chueh Lin	Chevalier	2011
Alan Marshall	Chevalier	2011
Ruben Marshall Tikalova	Chevalier	2011
Partha Pratim Majumder	Chevalier	2011
Pedro Ruiz	Chevalier	2011
Amanda Sthers	Chevalier	2011
Jiro Taniguchi	Chevalier	2011
Barthélémy Toguo	Chevalier	2011
Estelle Touzet	Chevalier	2011
Glenda Bailey	Chevalier	2012
Aishwarya Rai Bachchan	Chevalier	2012
Will Barnet	Chevalier	2012
Cate Blanchett	Chevalier	2012
Leila Hatami	Chevalier	2012
Blake Byrne	Chevalier	2012
Joe Dallesandro	Chevalier	2012
Nancy Holt	Chevalier	2012
Ang Lee	Chevalier	2012
Emilio Maillé	Chevalier	2012
Maria Pergay	Chevalier	2012
Carla Peterson	Chevalier	2012
Shakira	Chevalier	2012
Yiorgos Veltsos	Chevalier	2012
Laurent Viérin	Chevalier	2012
Wang Anyi	Chevalier	2013
Iwona Blazwick	Chevalier	2013
Michal Govrin	Chevalier	2013
Chinmoy Guha	Chevalier	2013
Anurag Kashyap	Chevalier	2013
Michael Kurtz	Chevalier	2013
Prshant Lahoti	Chevalier	2013
Loreena McKennitt	Chevalier	2013
Leonardo Padura	Chevalier	2013
Howard A. Rodman	Chevalier	2013
Scott Stover	Chevalier	2013
Alain Altinoglu	Chevalier	2014
Michka Assayas	Chevalier	2014
Pablo Bartholomew	Chevalier	2014
Emmanuelle Bercot	Chevalier	2014
Emmanuèle Bernheim	Chevalier	2014
Valeria Bruni Tedeschi	Chevalier	2014
Christopher Buchholz	Chevalier	2014
Judith Chemla	Chevalier	2014
Émilie Cozette	Chevalier	2014
Candan Erçetin	Chevalier	2014
Charlotte Eyerman	Chevalier	2014
Jean-Yves Ferri	Chevalier	2014
Jean-Pierre Gibrat	Chevalier	2014
Dorothée Gilbert	Chevalier	2014
Hélène Giraud	Chevalier	2014
Nora Gubisch	Chevalier	2014
Mia Hansen-Løve	Chevalier	2014
Reda Kateb	Chevalier	2014
Bernard Lahire	Chevalier	2014
Mélanie Laurent	Chevalier	2014
Sébastien Lifshitz	Chevalier	2014
Brillante Mendoza	Chevalier	2014
Denis Menochet	Chevalier	2014
Léonora Miano	Chevalier	2014
Myriam Ould-Braham	Chevalier	2014
Zhou Xun	Chevalier	2014
James Lipton	Chevalier	2014
Antoine Picon	Chevalier	2014
Frédéric Pierrot	Chevalier	2014
Sophie Rois	Chevalier	2014
Vanessa Seward	Chevalier	2014
Sylvaine Strike	Chevalier	2014
Marie-José Susskind-Jalou	Chevalier	2014
Thomas Szabo	Chevalier	2014
Rebecca Zlotowski	Chevalier	2014
Bertrand Bonello	Chevalier	2015
Roger Dale	Chevalier	2015
Estelle Forget	Chevalier	2015
Elliott Murphy	Chevalier	2015
Jill Shaw Ruddock	Chevalier	2015
Paul Ruddock	Chevalier	2015
Matthias Schoenaerts	Chevalier	2015
Gaspard Ulliel	Chevalier	2015
Pierre Hinard	Chevalier	2015
Alaa Al Aswany	Chevalier	2016
Aydin Aghdashloo	Chevalier	2016
Olafur Eliasson	Chevalier	2016
Joshua Fineberg	Chevalier	2016
Kamal Haasan	Chevalier	2016
Rosa Liksom	Chevalier	2016
Mads Mikkelsen	Chevalier	2016
Vasilis Papavasileiou	Chevalier	2016
Jane Rutter	Chevalier	2016
Flemming Rose	Chevalier	2016
Thomas Vinterberg	Chevalier	2016
Pedro Winter	Chevalier	2016
Driss El Maloumi	Chevalier	2016
Daniel Bruhl	Chevalier	2017
Dave Kehr	Chevalier	2017
Philipp Meyer	Chevalier	2017
Zeruya Shalev	Chevalier	2017
Helen Rappel Bordman	Chevalier	2017
Seán Mac Cárthaigh	Chevalier	2017
Sinéad Mac Aodha	Chevalier	2017
Sylvia Chang	Chevalier	2017
C. David Tseng	Chevalier	2017
Anne Kern	Chevalier	2018
Dennis Lim	Chevalier	2018
Laetitia Dosch	Chevalier	2018
Waed Bouhassoun	Chevalier	2018
Eva Green	Chevalier	2018
Kalki Koechlin	Chevalier	2018
Emeka Okereke	Chevalier	2018
Manal Ataya	Chevalier	2018
Ralph Gibson	Chevalier	2018
Enrique Mazzola	Chevalier	2018
Amparo Ramon	Chevalier	2019
Tijana Plakovljević Bugarski	Chevalier	2019
Miloš Konstantinović	Chevalier	2019
Akira Toriyama	Chevalier	2019
Go Nagai	Chevalier	2019
Didier Lean Rachou	Chevalier	2019
Bella Disu	Chevalier	2019
Lise Bach Hansen	Chevalier	2018
Claude Lorin	Chevalier	2021
Margaret M. McGowan	Chevalier	2020
Samuel Étienne	Chevalier	2021
Charline Avenel	Chevalier	2021
Guneet Monga	Chevalier	2021
Cindy Chao	Chevalier	2021
Bina Shah	Chevalier	2022
Garry Hynes	Chevalier	2022
Miki Manojlović	Chevalier	2022
Valentine Delattre	Chevalier	2022
Rama Ayalon	Chevalier	2022
Shashank Subramanyam	Chevalier	2022
Václav Luks	Chevalier	2022
Richa Chadha	Chevalier	2023
Kenny Garrett	Chevalier	2023
Rumiko Takahashi	Chevalier	2023
Eiji Aonuma	Chevalier	2023
Abdelmonem Bin Eisa Alserkal	Chevalier	2023
Jeffrey Rosen	Chevalier	2024
Cheikh Tidiane Gaye	Chevalier	2024
Georgi Gospodinov	Chevalier	2024
Gerard Malanga	Chevalier	2024
Ahmed Mater	Chevalier	2024
Denis Villeneuve	Chevalier	2024
Zoe Saldaña	Chevalier	2024
Karla Sofía Gascón	Chevalier	2024
Selena Gomez	Chevalier	2024
Adriana Paz	Chevalier	2024
Édgar Ramírez	Chevalier	2024
Sebastian Barry	Chevalier	2024
Che Lovelace	Chevalier	2025
Sophie Lacaze	Chevalier	2025
Suzie LeBlanc	Chevalier	2024
Louise Richardson	Chevalier	2025
Sandfall Interactive (Note: Recipient(s): Guillaume Broche, Tom Guillermin, François Meurisse, Nicholas Maxson-Francombe and every core members from the studio.)	Chevalier	2026
Dan Brown	Chevalier	2026
Offer Nissim	Chevalier	2026
Liv Strömquist	Chevalier	2026
