= Andrés Neumann =

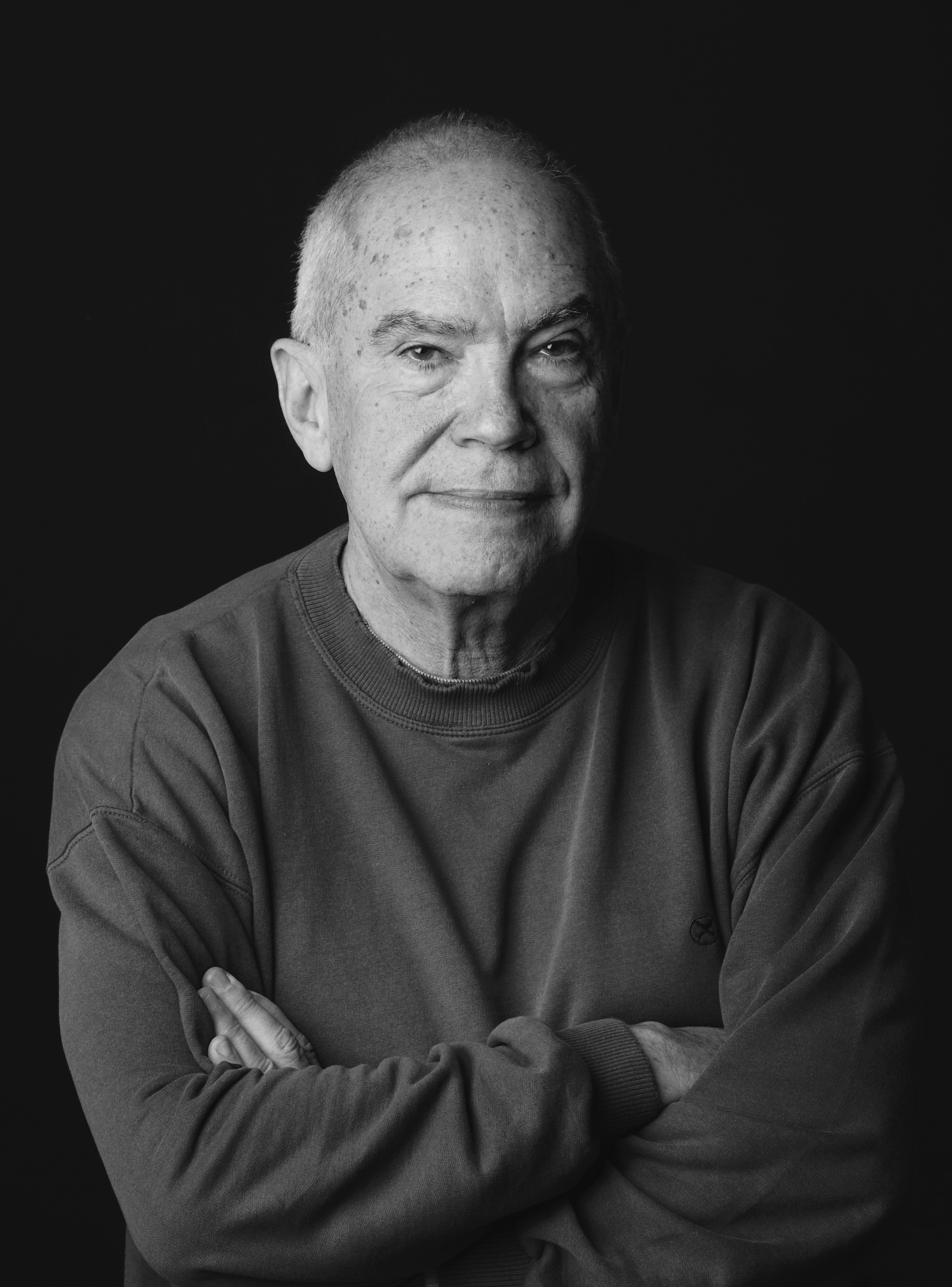
Andrés Neumann

Andrés Neumann (born 1943) is a polyglot design thinker, and performing arts and creative and cultural industries professional. He was born in Bolivia, raised in Uruguay and established in Europe.

== Biography ==
=== Beginnings ===
Andres Neumann was born in Cochabamba, Bolivia in 1943, to central European parents. His family moved to Montevideo, Uruguay, when he was five years old. His mother tongue was German, and he learned Spanish, the official language of Uruguay, only at elementary school.

He developed a specific interest for the arts and culture very early, and especially for film and theater.

At age 21 he married Betina Camacho, age 15. Together with his wife he joined the theater company from the Alliance Française in Montevideo, directed by Bernard Schnerb, a professor from the institute.

Neumann quickly became active in the cultural life of Montevideo, working professionally for theater, dance and music events held in the main venues of the city, including Teatro Solis, Teatro El Galpón, and Teatro Circular. He cooperated with artists such as Omar Grasso, Carlos Manuel Varela, Luis Cerminara, Roberto Restuccia, Teresa Trujillo, Carlos Carvalho, Hugo Mazza, Jorge Carrozino and Carmen Prieto, Eduardo Mateo, Diane Denoir, and Bernardo Bergeret.

During the same years Neumann made frequent trips to Europe and the US, where he became acquainted with the avant garde movements of the time.

In 1970 he received the award for "Best Soundtrack of the Year" conferred by the Theater Critics Association of Uruguay, and in 1972 he received, jointly with Jorge Carrozino and Carmen Prieto, a commission from the Museo Nacional de Artes Visuales (MNAV) to fit out an important anthological exhibition of paintings and artwork by Rafael Barradas.

=== Relationship with France ===
The Alliance Française in Montevideo was central to the cultural life of Montevideo in a critical moment for the country and the continent. A new and modern building had been specially commissioned and constructed in Calle Soriano 1180, including a theater venue with a seating capacity of 200. For this institution, Neumann, Jorge Carrozino and Carmen Prieto (CPN) created several theatrical audiovisual environments (inspired by the French Son et Lumière): Figari, Picasso 90 and 73 Dias. Thanks to these performances the trio received in October 1972 a grant from CUIFERD, sponsored by Jack Lang (future Minister of Culture of France), to work for the Festival Mondial du Théatre de Nancy.

This invitation came at the right time, because the arts and artists began to be persecuted by a deteriorating political system. Military dictatorships were in the making in Chile, Argentina, Brazil and Uruguay. The departure of Neumann won right-wing newspaper headlines suspecting him of leaving the country in order to be trained by the French government in urban guerrilla.

In the meantime, Neumann had married his second wife, Lily Salvo, an important painter and artist belonging to the Taller Torres García. She was part of the active cultural life in Latin America, including Pablo Neruda and Ernesto Sabato. From their marriage a daughter named Mara was born. Andres, Lily and Mara left Uruguay in October 1972 and settled in Nancy, France, for the next two years.

The Festival Mondial du Théatre de Nancy was at the time the world center for experimental theater, and in general for the research of new languages in the arts and culture. There Neumann met Tadeusz Kantor, Bob Wilson, Meredith Monk, Augusto Boal, Peter Schumann, Pina Bausch and Dario Fo.

Neumann was an active member of the staff of the festival until 1978, appointed to curate the artistic delegations of various Scandinavian and Eastern countries as well as Italy, where he settled with his family in 1974.

=== Relationship with Italy ===
In 1974 Neumann, encouraged among others by Luigi Nono, Italian avant-garde composer and member of the central committee of the Communist Party, settled in Florence while continuing his cooperation as artistic curator of the Italian delegation to the Festival Mondial du Théatre de Nancy. The role of curator had put him in connection with the Italian theater world and in particular with the Teatro Regionale Toscano (now Fondazione Toscana Spettacoli). He was soon engaged by this organisation to curate a special section dedicated to experimental theater at Teatro Rondo di Bacco, a venue in the left wing of Palazzo Pitti. Neumann curated three seasons at Teatro Rondo di Bacco in Florence, inviting among many others the Bread and Puppet Theater, Bob Wilson, Meredith Monk from the US, Tadeusz Kantor with the Cricot 2 from Poland and Roberto Benigni from Italy. As talent scout, Neumann promoted internationally the work of Italian theater artist and companies such as Magazzini Criminali and Pierluigi Pieralli from Florence, and Remondi & Caporossi and Memé Perlini from Rome.

After his engagement in Florence he was commissioned by Carlo Molfese to create for Teatro Tenda (Piazza Mancini, Rome) a festival under the name of Rassegna Internazionale di Teatro Popolare, where artists such as Marcel Marceau from France, Vittorio Gassman and Gigi Proietti from Italy, Teatro Campesino from the US, Tadashi Suzuki from Japan, Robert Serumaga from Uganda and Jango Edwards from Netherlands were presented. During this activity in Rome Major, Carlo Giulio Argan, and Secretary for Culture, Renato Nicolini, invited Neumann to develop for the city of Rome a special project dedicated to cutting-edge performing arts. A long and close working cooperation with Renato Nicolini to enhance national and international cultural exchange programs in the arts and culture between the City of Rome and other important Italian and world cities was put in place. Part of this program was a production of a performance directed by Richard Foreman with the Ontological-Hysterical Theater from New York City, guest performances of Ariane Mnouchkine and the Théatre du Soleil, of Peter Brook, Terry Riley, and the National Theater from London, the projection of the film Napoleon by Abel Gance with live orchestra directed by Carmine Coppola (father to Francis Ford) in front of the Roman Colosseum to the presence of Jack Lang and Danielle Mitterrand.

== Andres Neumann International ==
In 1979 Neumann simultaneously curated two major international theatrical production projects for two important stage directors in two different cities. Wielopole Wielopole for Tadeusz Kantor in Florence, and Place and Target for Richard Foreman in Rome.

In the same year a private presenting and production company was established: Andres Neumann International. This move was inspired by the advice of Franco Camerlinghi, at that time Secretary of Culture for the city of Florence. The first client of this company were the brothers I Colombaioni, the clowns who had worked with Federico Fellini for the film The Clowns (1970). For them, and during the following years, an international tour in more than 100 world cities was put in place.

Between 1979 and 2000 Andres Neumann International became the center of a worldwide network of cultural exchange projects for the performing arts. Ingmar Bergman from Sweden, Andrzej Wajda from Poland, Luca Ronconi, Vittorio Gassman, Dario Fo from Italy, the Comédie Francaise and Peter Brook from France, The Kabuki from Japan, and Pina Bausch from Germany entrusted their work to Andres Neumann during those years.

Until 1985 the company was based in Florence. After the international co-production project for Peter Brook's The Mahabharata, the company moved its headquarters to Rome, where it kept operating until 2000.

== Recent years ==
In 1990 Neumann bought a country house in Anghiari, Tuscany, where he then spent most of his time. He undertook a process of transformation in the attempt to find the roots of art and culture through physical and spiritual practices. Thanks to Peter Brook he approached the Gurdjieff groups, and thanks to Graciela Figueroa he approached the Claudio Naranjo SAT groups. His interest in theater and dance shifted from the finished production to the practical creative and pedagogical process, thus meeting individuals such as Enrique Vargas, Kristin Linklater and Juan Carlos Corazza.

In 2001 he had a son, René, with Viviana Benci, a school teacher he had met at the Gurdjieff groups.

Also the connection to his origins in South America were reestablished, and he started to regularly spend time in both continents.

=== Incubator and archive for the arts and culture in Tuscany ===
In 2004, together with the Associazione Culturale Teatro Studio Blu, Neumann started to develop a project for the creation of a cultural center in Pistoia. This project came to a conclusion in 2009 with the opening of the Il Funaro Cultural Center, and the donation to the Center of the Archivio Teatrale Andres Neumann. The center is a venue with three working spaces, dressing rooms, office space, restaurant, construction laboratory, library and guesthouse for 16 people

Andres Neumann Archive and Legacy is being developed in accordance with the Department of History, Archaeology, Geography, Arts and Performance of the University of Florence

The development of the Andres Neumann Archive and Legacy project has been entirely implemented by Giada Petrone, who previously worked for the archives of Renato Nicolini and Judith Malina.

Il Funaro Cultural Center has been internationally recognised as a model of incubator for the arts and culture.

== At present ==
At present Neumann is active as a professional for the creative and cultural industries, coaching, teaching and promoting individuals and entities with missions in the arts. He lives in Buenos Aires, Argentina since 2023.

== Honours ==
- Officier de l'Ordre des Arts et des Lettres (2014)
- Chevalier de l'Ordre des Arts et des Lettres (1986)

== Awards ==
UBU Award for the "Best Foreign Theater Performance in Italy" achieved by the following productions presented by Andres Neumann International:

- 1994 Brothers and Sisters, directed by Lev Dodin
- 1991 Gaudeamus, directed by Lev Dodin
- 1991 The Tempest, by William Shakespeare, directed by Peter Brook
- 1990 Palermo Palermo, by Pina Bausch
- 1989 Long Day's Journey Into Night, by Eugene O'Neill, directed by Ingmar Bergman
- 1988 Six characters in search of an author, by Luigi Pirandello, directed by Anatolij Vassiliev
- 1986 The Mahabharata, by Peter Brook and Jean-Claude Carrière

Other awards

- 1970 Circulo de la Critica Teatral (Montevideo, Uruguay) Mejor Ambientacion Sonora (best sound design for a theatrical production)

== Bibliography ==
- Andrés Neumann, El Tiempo Vuela: Autobiografía de un Políglota, Roma, Amazon, 2018
- Andrea Ottanelli, Inventario dell'Archivio Teatrale Andres Neumann, Ed. Il Funaro Centro Culturale, Pistoia, 2016.
- Maria Fedi, L'Archivio Andres Neumann. Memoria dello spettacolo contemporaneo, con una presentazione di Renzo Guardenti e una testimonianza di Giada Petrone, Titivillus, 2013
- Teresa Trujillo, Cuerpo a cuerpo. Reflexiones de una artista, Trilce, Montevideo, 2012, pp. 64–65,73.
- Ángel Kalemberg, Intimidades a la vista. Un exdirector de un museo de arte en lucha con la memoria, nel Catalogo Centenario del MNAV, Mastergraf srl, Montevideo, 2011, pp. 33–34
- Gennaro Colangelo, Carlo Molfese, Un teatro a Roma. L'avventura del Teatro Tenda di Piazza Mancini, Roma, Gangemi Editore, 2006, pp. 87, 89.
- Sandro Lombardi, Gli anni felici. Realtà e memoria nel lavoro dell'attore, Milano, Garzanti, 2004, p. 150.
- Jaqueline Amati- Mehler, La babele dell'inconscio, Milano, La Feltrinelli, 2003, pp. 169–175.
- Valerio Valoriani, Kantor a Firenze, Corazzano (Pisa), Titivillus Edizioni, 2002, pp. 51–52.
- Jòzef Chrobak, Carlo Sisi, Tadeusz Kantor. Dipinti, disegni, teatro, Roma Edizioni di storia e letteratura, 2002, p. VI.
- Fernando Peláez, De las Cuevas al Solís. Cronología del Rock en el Uruguay 1960–1975, Montevideo, Perro Andaluz ediciones, 2002, p. 127.
- Voce Andres Neumann, in Jorge Pignataro Calero, María Rosa Carbajal, Diccionario del teatro uruguayo, Montevideo, Cal y Canto, 2002.
- Guilherme De Alencar Pinto, Razones locas. El paso de Eduardo Mateo por la música uruguaya, Montevideo, Ediciones del TUMP, 1995 p. 48.
- Renato Nicolini, Estate Romana. 1976-85: un effimero lungo nove anni, Siena, Edizioni Sisifo, 1991, pp. 55, 148.
- Jack Lang, Jean-Denis Bredin, Éclats, Francia, Jean-Claude Simoën, 1978, p. 106.

== See also ==
- Pina Bausch
- Peter Brook
- Tadeusz Kantor
- Meredith Monk
- Dario Fo
- Marcello Mastroianni
- Vittorio Gassman
- Ingmar Bergman
- Andrzej Wajda
