= Czech Mexicans =

Czech Mexicans checo-mexicanos České Mexičany
Total population
- 537 Czech Republic-born residents (2019); Unknown number of Mexicans of Czech descent

Regions with significant populations
- Mexico City

Languages
- Spanish (Mexican Spanish) · Czech

Religion
- Predominantly Irreligion · Roman Catholic (minority)

Related ethnic groups
- Czech diaspora

Czech Mexicans (Spanish: checo-mexicanos; Czech: České Mexičany) are citizens of Mexico who are of Czech descent. Czechs originate from the Czech lands, a term which refers to the majority of the traditional lands of the Bohemian Crown, namely Bohemia, Moravia and Czech Silesia. These lands have been governed by a variety of states, including the Kingdom of Bohemia, a crown land of the Austrian Empire, the Czechoslovak Republic, and, now, the Czech Republic.

== History ==
=== Jesuit missionaries ===
During the colonial era, there were several Bohemian Jesuit missionaries involved in the evangelization of Mexico. The first Jesuits left Bohemia for the Americas in 1678. A notable example is Simon Boruhradsky (Hispanicized as Simón de Castro) who was part of the Viceroy's court and contributed to architectural projects.

=== Recent immigration ===
The Czech community in Mexico has been a discrete community, most of them arrived to the country as refugees escaping from World Wars. The Czech community of Mexico City frequently meets for celebrations at the statue of Tomáš Garrigue Masaryk located on Avenida Presidente Masaryk.

== Notable individuals ==
- Angélica Espinoza Stransky, actress
- Juan de Esteyneffer, Jesuit missionary
- Wenceslaus Linck, Jesuit missionary
- Rubén Marshall Tikalova, editorial director
- Miroslava, actress of the Golden Age of Mexican cinema
- Sylvia Schmelkes, sociologist
- Sasha Sokol, actress and singer
- Luisito Comunica (Luis Arturo Villar Sudek), YouTuber and blogger

== See also ==
- Czech Republic–Mexico relations
- Norteño (music), influenced by Central European immigrants
- Czech diaspora
- White Mexicans
