= Papavasiliou =

Papavasiliou or Papavasileiou (Greek: Παπαβασιλείου) is a Greek surname. Notable people with the surname include:

- Georgina Papavasiliou (born 1981), Scottish figure skater of Greek descent
- Georgios Papavasileiou (1930–2020), Greek middle-distance and steeplechase runner
- Nikodimos Papavasiliou (born 1970), Cypriot football player and manager
- Nina Papavasiliou, Greek immunologist
- Sakis Papavasiliou (born 1976), Greek football player and manager
- Vasilis Papavasileiou (1949–2025), Greek theatre director, actor, writer and translator
