= Evert Endt =

French designer (1933–2025)

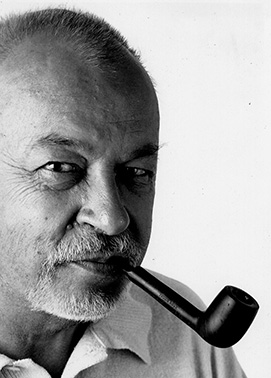
Evert Endt

Evert Endt (25 July 1933 – 21 March 2025) was a French designer.

== Early life ==
Evert Endt was born in Zaandam, the Netherlands on 25 July 1933. He grew up in Switzerland and studied in Zurich at the Kunstgewerbeschule.

== Career ==
In 1958, Endt started his career in the Compagnie de L'Esthétique Industrielle (CEI) by Raymond Loewy, a design agency based in Paris. He later became the Artistic Director and in 1968 the Director of the CEI, which is responsible for numerous programs of global design such as BP, Shell, Coop, and Elna Lotus (Permanent Collection of the Museum of Modern Art New York) and Rivella, Motta.

In 1974, he received French nationality. The following year, he set up Endt+Fulton Partners with American designer James F. Fulton. Since 1992 the agency participated in social programs focused on the environment. He worked for various cultural and industrial bodies, under the Ministries of Health, Culture and French Justice.

He created exhibitions for the Centre Georges Pompidou and the Cité des Sciences et de l'Industrie de la Villette. His permanent and temporary thematic exhibitions include "Living in Space", "Energies", and "New Materials".

In 1992, Evert Endt was appointed director of Ensci/Les Ateliers - Ecole Nationale Supérieure de Creation Industrielle - in Paris. The following year, he became director for the postgraduate program in research and management of new technologies in the Samsung Laboratory for Innovative Design.

Endt died on 21 March 2025, at the age of 91.

== Awards ==
- Prix International "Intérieur 80" Biennale de Courtrai 1980
- Label design français (esthétique industrielle) 1982-84
- Janus de l'Industrie 1985
- Oscar du journal Nouvel Économiste 1986
- Nomination of Chevalier des arts et lettres par le Ministère de la Culture 1998

== Publications ==
- France culture
- The New York Times
- Graphis
- Musée d'art moderne et contemporain Saint-Etienne Métropole
- The Washington Post
- ARTE
- ARTE 2017
