= Czech Republic–Mexico relations =

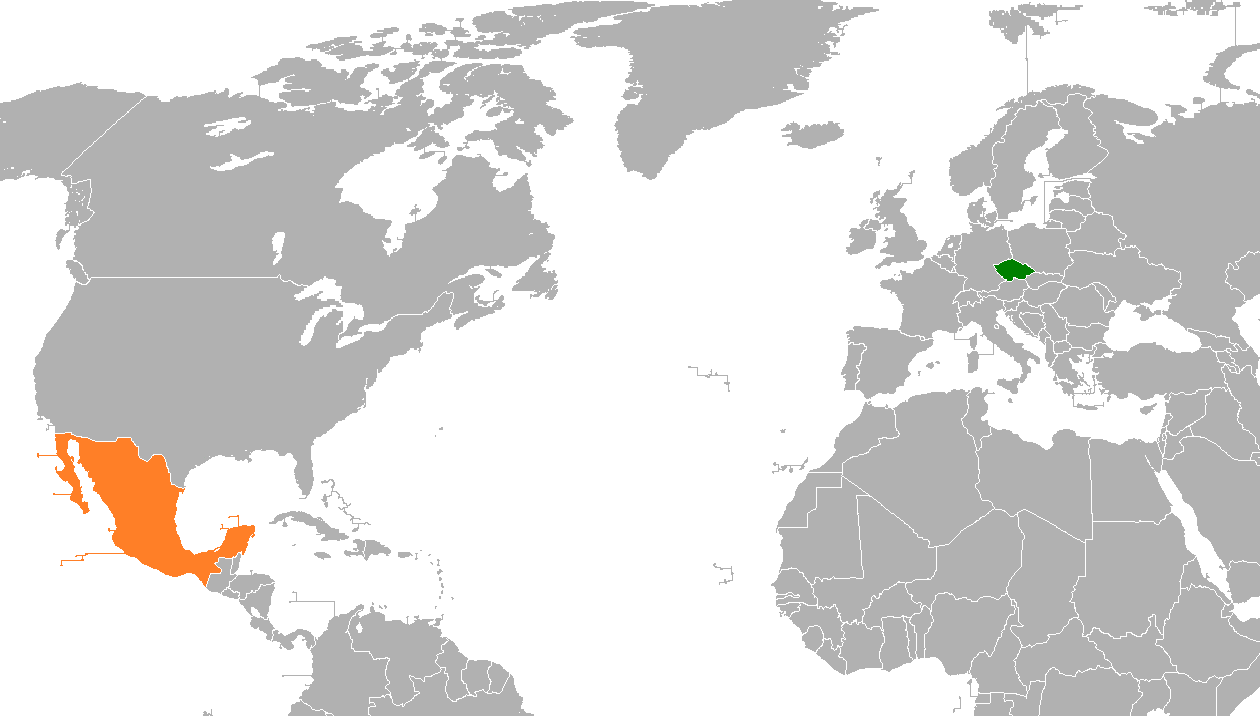

- Czech Republic: Mexico

The nations of the Czech Republic and Mexico established diplomatic relations in 1993. Relations between both nations existed beginning in 1922 when the Czech Republic was part of Czechoslovakia until its separation from the union in 1992.

Both countries are members of the Organisation for Economic Co-operation and Development and the United Nations.

== History ==
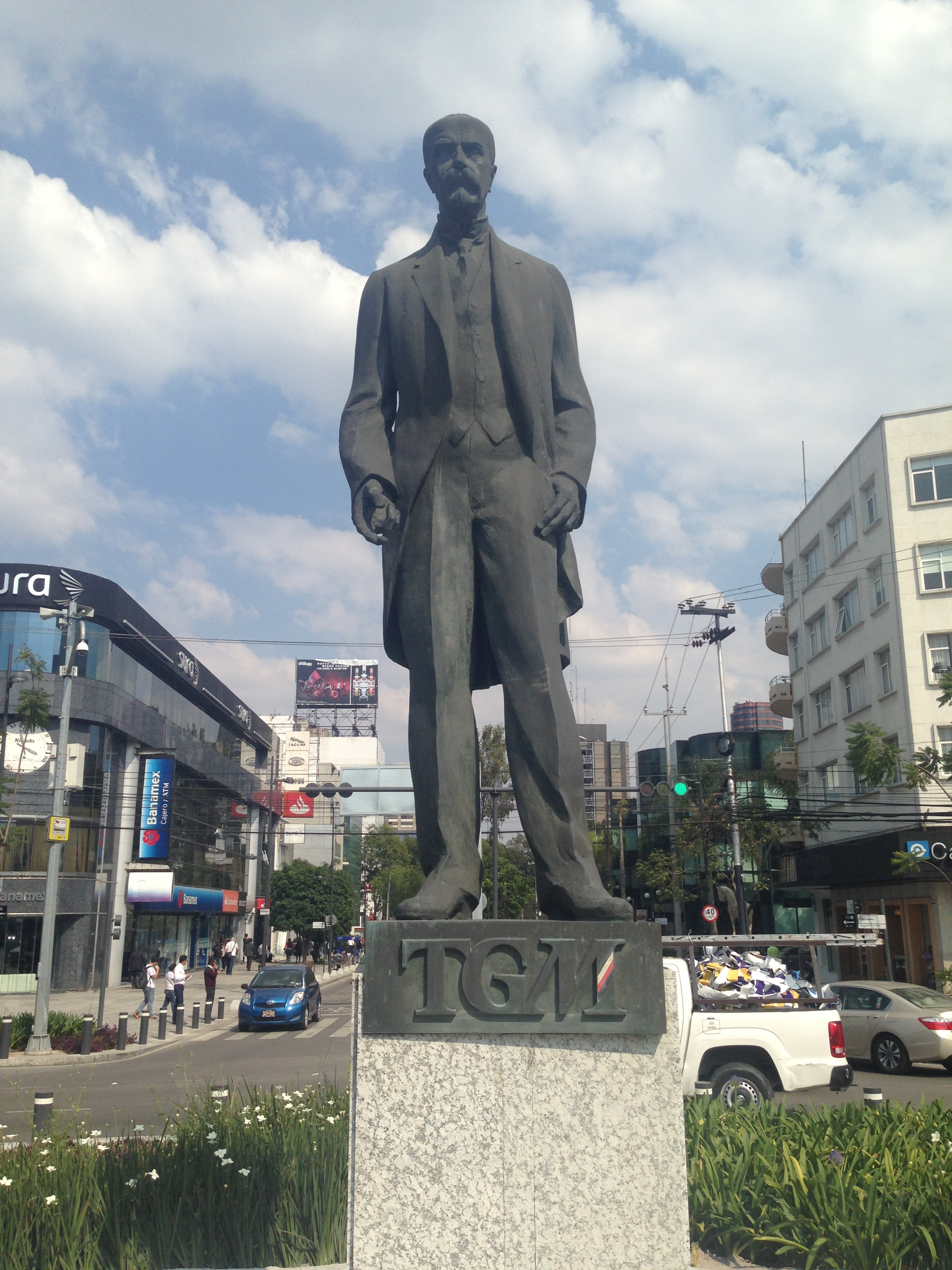
Statue of first Czechoslovak President Tomáš Masaryk in Mexico City

Mexico established diplomatic relations with then Czechoslovakia in 1922; four years after the country proclaimed its independence from the Austro-Hungarian Empire. That same year, both nations opened consulates in each other's capitals, respectively. In 1936, Mexican President Lázaro Cárdenas named one of the principle streets in the Polanco neighborhood of Mexico City after the first Czechoslovak President Tomáš Masaryk. For its part, there is a Lázaro Cárdenas Square (Park Generála Lázaro Cárdenase) in the Prague 6 district.

Diplomatic relations between the two nations were interrupted in April 1939 after the invasion from Germany in the country, however, the exiled Czechoslovak government in London maintained relations with Mexico. Mexico condemned the annexations of Czech lands by Germany at the League of Nations. In 1942, diplomatic relations were fully restored between the two nations and in 1959, embassies were established in each other's capitals, respectively.

In August 1990, Czechoslovak President Václav Havel paid an official visit to Mexico. In 1991, Mexican President Carlos Salinas de Gortari paid an official visit to Czechoslovakia. In December 1992, Czechoslovakia was split into the Czech Republic and Slovakia. Mexico established diplomatic relations with the Czech Republic on 1 January 1993. In October 2001, Mexican President Vicente Fox paid an official visit to the Czech Republic. Official celebrations and bilateral reunions were held with Czech President Václav Havel at Prague Castle.

In May 2022, the Czech Republic and Mexico celebrated 100 years of the establishment of diplomatic relations.

== High-level visits ==
High-level visits from Czechoslovakia/Czech Republic to Mexico

- President Václav Havel (August 1990 & October 1993)
- Prime Minister Miloš Zeman (April 2002)
- Foreign Vice-Minister David Gladis (June 2007)
- Foreign Vice-Minister Helena Bambasová (October 2008)
- Foreign Vice-Minister Ivan Jančárek (June 2015)
- Foreign Minister Tomáš Petříček (October 2019)

High-level visits from Mexico to Czechoslovakia/Czech Republic

- President Carlos Salinas de Gortari (July 1991)
- President Vicente Fox (October 2001)
- Foreign Undersecretary Lourdes Aranda (November 2005)
- Foreign Secretary Patricia Espinosa Cantellano (May 2009)
- Foreign Undersecretary Carmen Moreno Toscano (May 2022)
- Foreign Undersecretary María Teresa Mercado (April 2026)

== Bilateral agreements ==
Both nations have signed a few bilateral agreements such as an Agreement on Air Transportation (1990); Agreement on Scientific, Technical and Technological Cooperation (1995); Agreement on Educational and Cultural Cooperation (2001); Agreement to Avoid Double Taxation and Prevent Tax Evasion in the Matter of Income and Wealth Taxes (2002) and an Agreement on Reciprocal Promotion and Protection of Investment (2002).

== Trade relations ==
In 1997, Mexico signed a Free Trade Agreement with the European Union (which includes the Czech Republic since 2004). In 2023, two-way trade between both nations amounted to US$1.3 billion. The Czech Republic main exports to Mexico include: telephones and mobile phones, machinery, electrical wires and cables, motor cars and other vehicles, iron, steel and glass. Mexico's main exports to the Czech Republic include: parts and accessories for machines, electrical equipment, copper tubes, parts and accessories for motor vehicles, food based products, and alcohol. Mexican multinational companies such as Cemex, Grupo Bimbo and Nemak (among others) operate in the Czech Republic.

== Resident diplomatic missions ==
- Czech Republic has an embassy in Mexico City.
- Mexico has an embassy in Prague.

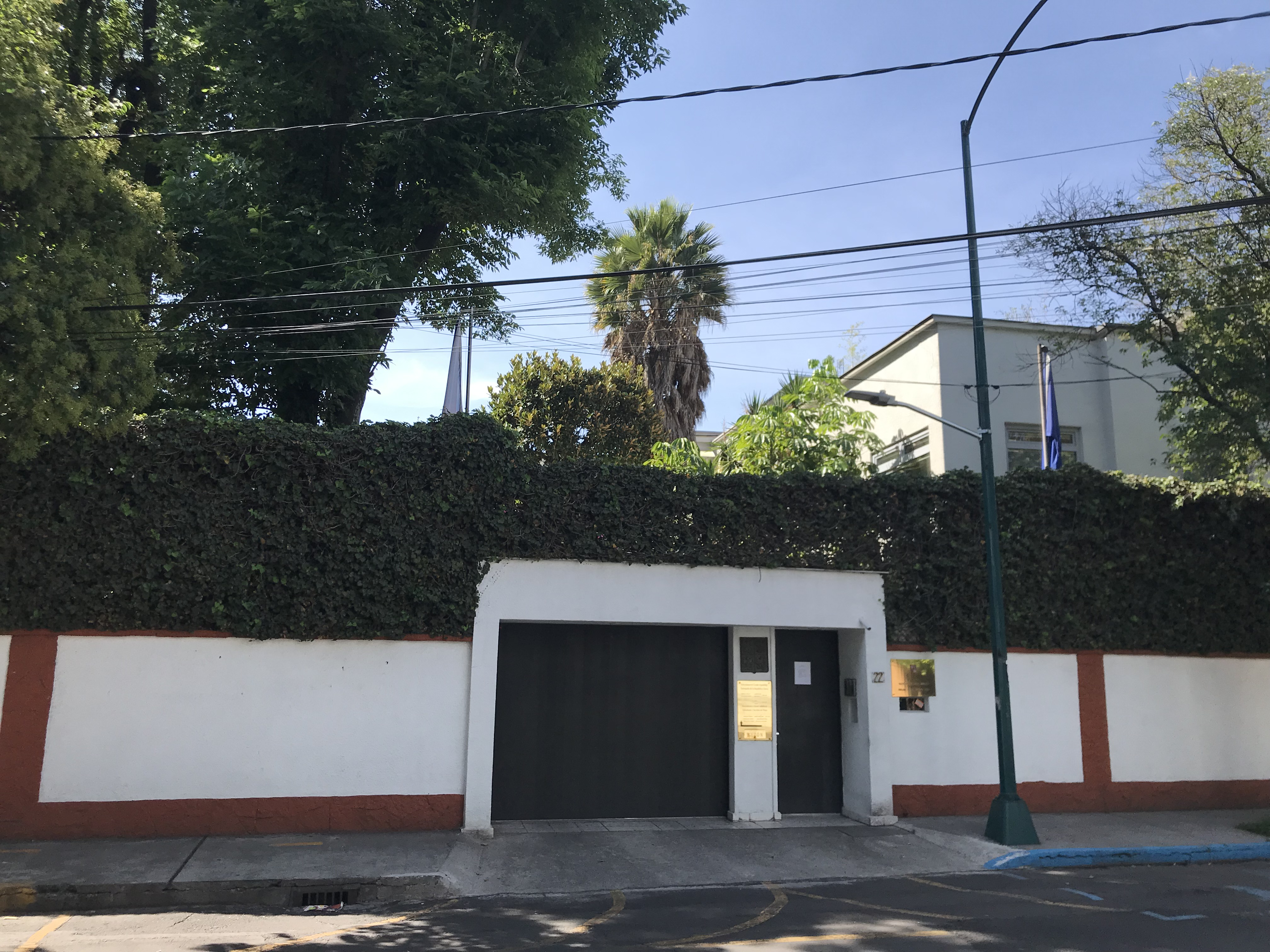
Embassy of the Czech Republic in Mexico City

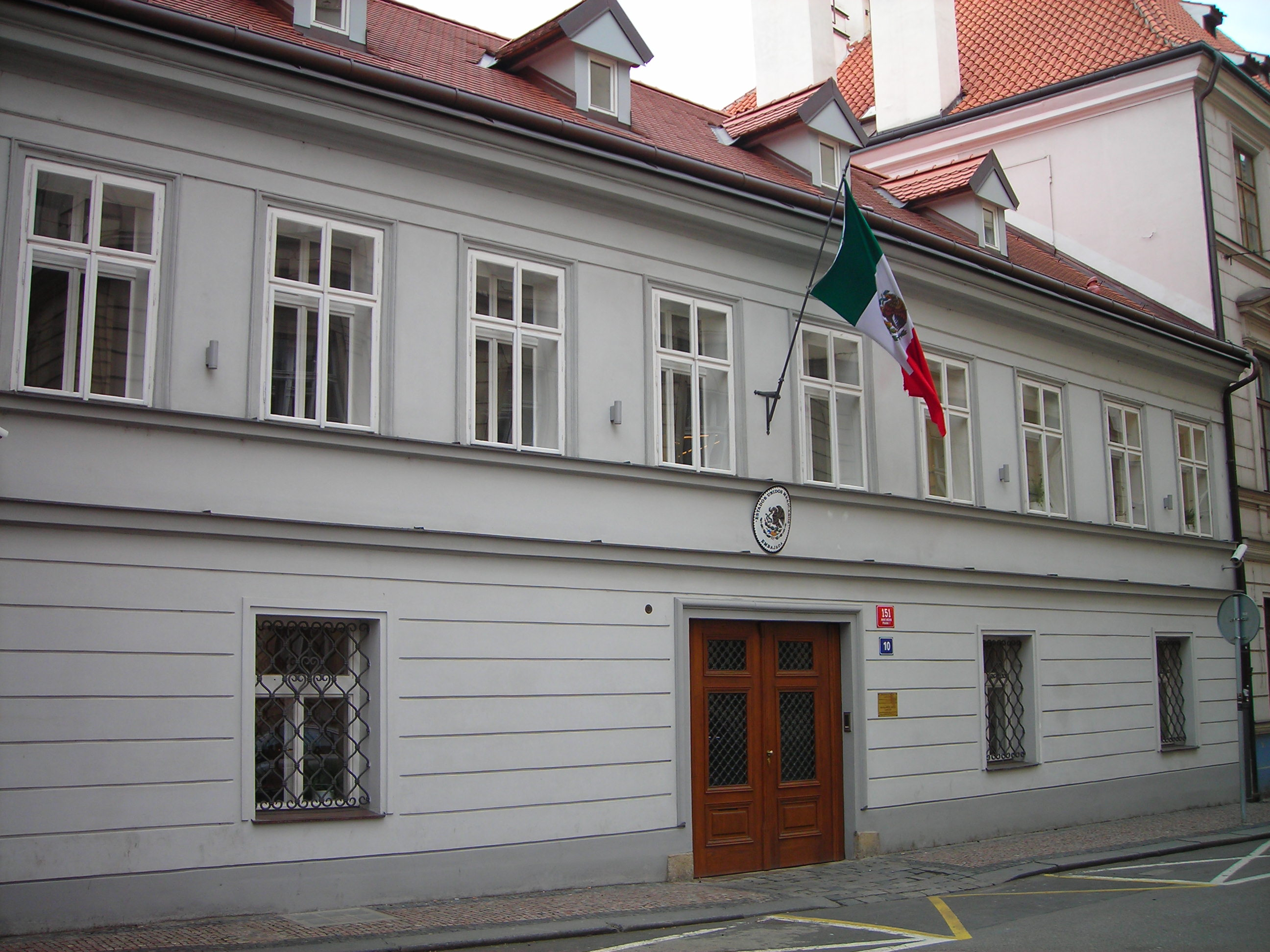
Embassy of Mexico in Prague

== See also ==
- Czech Mexicans
