= Daria Galateria =

Italian writer and professor (born 1950)

Daria Galateria is an Italian writer and professor.

== Biography ==
Daria Galateria was born in Rome, Italy, in 1950. She graduated in Literature at the Sapienza University of Rome with a thesis on monologue in Stéphane Mallarmé and Paul Valéry. She has taught French Literature and Language at the Sapienza University of Rome since 1975. Over the years her research has focused in particular on the female memoir. She also edited the first Italian commented edition of Proust's Remembrance of Things Past.

In 1996 she was awarded the "Grinzane Cavour" for the book "Fughe dal re Sole". In 2005 she was nominated Officier de l'Ordre des Arts et des Lettres.

She hosted two cultural programs for Rai Radio 2 and Rai Radio 3, called Alle 8 della sera and Spazio Tre, respectively. She collaborates with Il Manifesto, La Repubblica and L'Espresso since 1990.

== Selected bibliography ==
- Breton, Mursia, 1977.
- Parigi 1789, Sellerio, 1989. (title translation: Paris 1789)
- Il tè a Port-Royal, Sellerio 1995. (title translation: Tea at Port-Royal)
- Fughe dal re Sole, Sellerio, 1996. (title translation: Escape from the Sun King)
- Scritti galeotti, Erirai, 2000. (title translation: Papers from prison)
- Entre nous, Sellerio, 2002. (title translation: Between us)
- Mestieri di scrittori, Sellerio, 2007. (title translation: Jobs of writers)

Galateria edited the Italian translation of 29 works by foreign authors:

- Marcel Proust, Ritorno a Guermantes, Studio Tesi, 1988
- Ortensia Mancini, I piaceri della stupidità, Sellerio, 19987.
- Principessa Palatina, Lettere, Sellerio, 1988.
- Madame de Caylus, Souvenirs, Sellerio, 1988.
- Madame de Duras, Il segreto, Sellerio, 1989.
- Ninon de Lenclos, Lettere sulla vecchiaia, Sellerio, 1991.
- Roger de Bussy-Rabutin, Storia amorosa delle Gallie, Sellerio, 1992.
- Buffon, Discorso sullo stile, Studio Tesi, 1994.
- Sarah Bernhardt, Gita in pallone, Jouvence, 1995.
- Nicolas de la Bretonne, Lettere di una scimmia, Sellerio, 1995.
- Madame de Staal-Delaunay, Memorie, Adelphi, 1995.
- Jean Giono, Una pazza felicità, Guanda 1996.
- Paul Morand, Il Sole offuscato, Fouquet e Luigi XIV, Corbaccio1996.
- Vivant Denon (not certain), La notte meravigliosa, ES, 1996.
- Louise de Vilmorin, Madame de V*** vede solo nero, ES, 1997.
- Mathilde Mauté, Moglie di Verlaine, Sellerio, 1998.
- Grace Dalrymple Elliott, La nobildonna e il duca, Fazi, 2001.
- Denis Diderot, Mystification, Archinto, 2001.
- Charles Perrault, Fiabe, Marsilio, 2002.
- Françoise Sagan, La guardia del cuore, Sellerio, 2003.
- Raymond Radiguet, Il ballo del conte d’Orgel, Sellerio, 2004.
- Madame de Charrière, Lettres écrites de Lausanne, Sellerio, 2005.
- Béatrix Saule, La giornata di Luigi XIV, Sellerio, 2006.
- Madame de Charriere, Tre donne, Dadò, 2008.
- Laure de Surville Balzac, Balzac mio fratello, Sellerio, 2008.
- Anatole France, Il procuratore della Giude, Sellerio, 2008.
- Jacques Chessex, Il vampiro di Ropraz, Fazi, 2009.
- Stéphane Audeguy, Mio fratello Rousseau, Fazi, 2010.
- Allen S. Weiss, Baudelaire cerca gloria, Sellerio, 2010.
