= Jill Shaw Ruddock =

Jill Shaw Ruddock CBE
- Born: Baltimore, Maryland, United States
- Education: Northwestern High School
- Alma mater: Bowdoin College, Brunswick Maine
- Occupations: Author & philanthropist
- Known for: The Second Half Centre and Foundation
- Board member of: The Second Half Foundation, The American Board of The Donmar Warehouse, The Mousetrap Theatre Projects, Bowdoin College Museum of Art, Victoria and Albert Museum Foundation
- Spouse: Paul Ruddock (married 1991 –present)
- Children: Sophie and Isabella
- Website: The Second Half Foundation; The Second Half Centre; JillShawRuddock.com

Jill Ann Shaw, Lady Ruddock, CBE (born November 1955) is a London-based philanthropist, author and former investment banker whose charitable work focuses on the arts and quality of life for the over 50. She is married to Sir Paul Ruddock.

== Early life ==
Ruddock was born in Baltimore, Maryland. She attended Northwestern High School in Baltimore before receiving a degree in Politics from Bowdoin College.

After early jobs in advertising and publishing for Young & Rubicam, Inc. Magazine and The Atlantic, she relocated to London in 1983 and co-ran The Government Research Corporation before joining Alex. Brown & Sons in 1985, becoming managing director in 1994. There she oversaw the mergers of the firm's European equity business with both Bankers Trust and Deutsche Bank.

== Philanthropy ==
After leaving Alex Brown in 1999, Ruddock became involved in the theatre, joining the main boards of The Donmar Warehouse and the educational theatre charity, The Mousetrap Theatre Projects, which seeks to bring theatre to disadvantaged young people.

She was a trustee of the main board of Governors at Bowdoin College for ten years. Together with her husband, they are donors at The Victoria and Albert Museum, the British Museum, the Courtauld Institute of Art, the Metropolitan Museum of Art in New York City, the Bowdoin College Museum of Art and are ambassadors of AfriKids, a child rights organisation that works alongside indigenous communities in Ghana to improve the quality of life for rejected and vulnerable children.

She and her husband are patrons of The Donmar Warehouse, The Mousetrap Theatre Projects, The Hampstead Theatre, The National Theatre and Almeida Theatre.

In May 2015, Ruddock was made a "Chevalier dans Ordre des Arts et Lettres" for services to French art, awarded by the French Government's Minister of Culture. She was made a Commander of the Order of the British Empire (CBE) in the 2016 New Year Honours, in recognition of her philanthropic work with older people.

== The Second Half of Your Life ==
Ruddock is the author of The Second Half of Your Life (Vermilion, 2011), a book about successful ageing using menopause as the hormonal springboard to get to the best years of a woman's life. It offers practical hands-on advice for post-menopausal women, covering many of the issues women face as they grow older: from finance, dating, divorce, exercise, going back to work, the libido, marriage, andropause and to how to look your best. The book also emphasises what she believes is the foundation for healthy ageing, her "Five A Day"; purpose, passion, exercise, nutrition and staying connected to family friends and community. The book is now in its 9th printing and was released in mass market paperback in March 2015.

"I'm trying to rebrand the entire process of getting old," she has told the press, arguing that the menopause should be welcomed rather than feared by women. All author proceeds go to fund the work of The Second Half Foundation.

== The Second Half Foundation and Second Half Centre ==
Ruddock is chairman and founder of The Second Half of Life Foundation (Reg 1141988), a charity which seeks to address loneliness and isolation among the over 50s for any person from any background over the age of 50: from the underprivileged to ethnic minorities to those who are just isolated through the creation of community centre. The first Second Half Centre opened in October 2012 at the NHS St. Charles's Hospital, North Kensington. The centre brings to life the "Five a Day" for successful ageing as cited in her book, offering older adults the opportunity to socialise, learn new skills, and exercise for a small fee. The project's supporters include Jeremy Hunt MP, Maureen Lipman and Ruby Wax. The Mayor of Kensington and Chelsea named the Second Half Foundation as her charity of the year in 2011–2012. The Second Half Foundation is creating a self-sustaining template to reflect 21st century solutions to the problems facing our ageing population in the 21st century. In addition to The Second Half Centre now run by Open Age, which has over 4000 members and 80 hours of activities weekly, Ruddock has expanded in London, partnering with the Diocese of London creating four Second Half Clubs in churches on days not of worship: St Stephen, St Andrews, St Paul's and St Mary The Boltons.

== Awards ==
- Jewish Care Woman of Distinction Award 2012
- Veuve Clicquot, Woman of The Year Tribute 2012
- Bowdoin College Common Good Award 2012
- The Libertine 100 2015 for "...challenging stereotypes about ageing"
- Chevaliers dans Ordre des Arts et des Lettres – awarded May 2015
- Commander of the Order of the British Empire (CBE) in the 2016 New Year Honours, for philanthropic services to older people.

== Personal life ==
She has been married to Sir Paul Ruddock, co-founder of Lansdowne Partners hedge fund, since 1991.

The couple have two adult daughters, Sophie and Isabella, and live in Notting Hill.

== Bibliography ==
- Ruddock, Jill Shaw (2011). The Second Half of Your Life (1st ed.). Vermillion March 2015 ISBN 9780091939496
- Ruddock, Jill Shaw (2015). The Second Half of Your Life (2nd ed.). Vermillion March 2015 ISBN 9780091955281
