= Teresa Trujillo =

Uruguayan dancer and actor

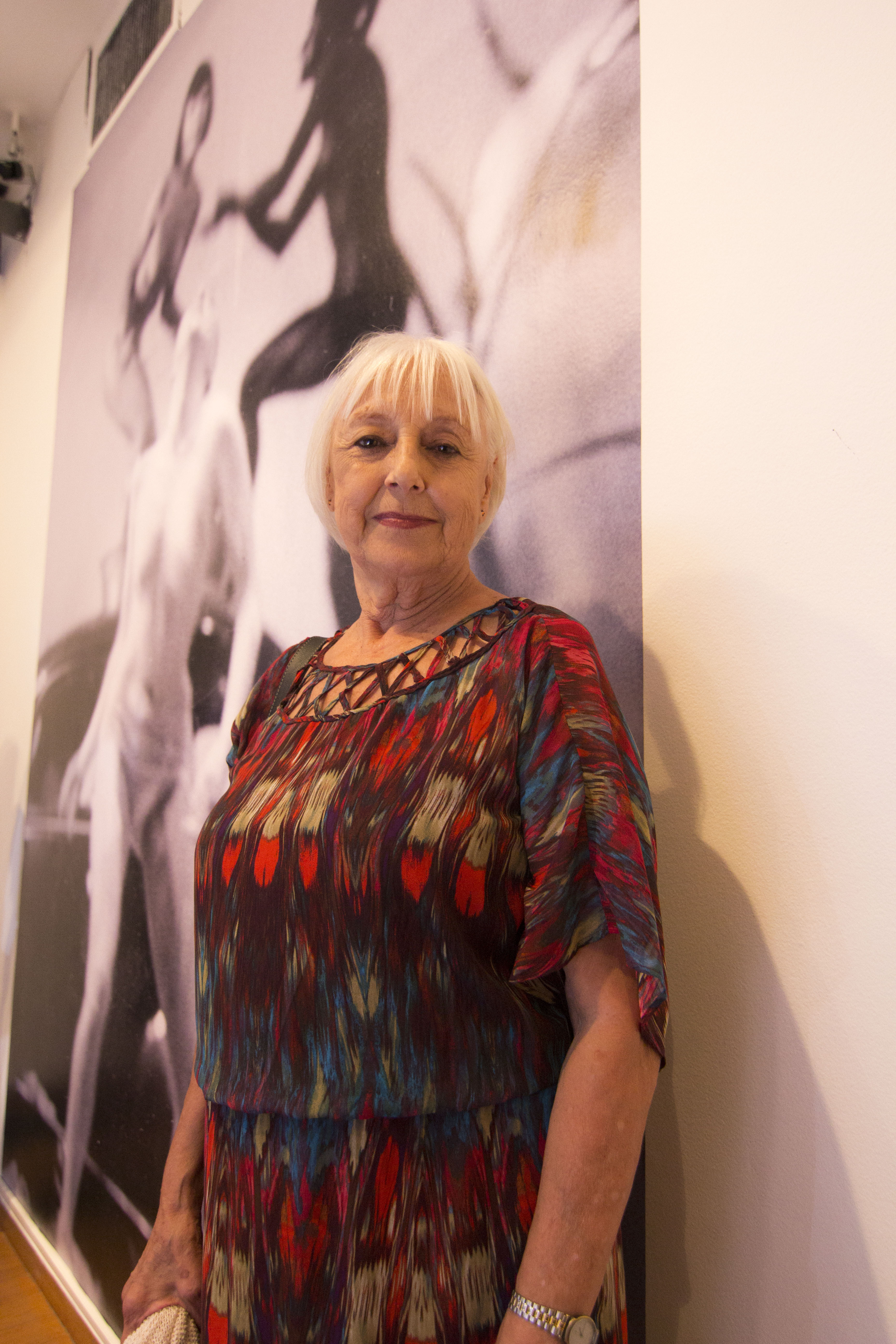
- Trujillo in 2016
- Born: April 4, 1937 (age 89); Pocitos, Montevideo, Uruguay
- Education: Kolischer Conservatory; Schola Cantorum, Paris; Eutonia of Buenos Aires
- Alma mater: Schola Cantorum, Paris
- Known for: Dance, choreography, performance art, activism
- Notable work: DanceEscalada (1969), Kaspar, Waiting for Godot (women's cast), Body, Place of Memory
- Style: Modern dance, performance art, interdisciplinary art
- Movement: Action art, feminist art, experimental dance
- Awards: Morosoli Award; Wings Award

Teresa Trujillo is a Uruguayan dancer, actor, choreographer, performing arts specialist and political activist. She has created dance and other performances in South America, Europe, and the United States.

== Biography ==
Trujillo was born on April 4, 1937, in the Pocitos barrio of Montevideo, Uruguay7. Trujillo began dancing at an early age. She studied ballet under Tamara Grigorieva until joining the Elsa Vallarino dance group. Trujillo also studied music at the Kolischer Conservatory.

In 1962, Trujillo moved to New York to study modern dance from Martha Graham and Jose Limon. In 1964, she completed her academic training at the Schola Cantorum in Paris. Trujillo then joined the Karin Waehner company, and began choreographing dances. she began experimenting with music, dance, and painting to create a multidisciplinary act.

By 1966, Trujillo was back in Uruguay. During this period, he found her work censored by the government of Jorge Pacheco Areco, which did not appreciate modern dance. In 1972, Trujillo left the country, spending time in Argentina, Chile, Cuba, Venezuela and Spain. In 1985, after the end of the military dictatorship, she returned to Uruguay.

In the 1990s, Trujillo switched from dance to theatre work, teaching at University of Music . She received up a degree from the Eutonia of Buenos Aires, where she would later teach.

== Activism ==
In the 1960s Trujillo, Graciela Figueroa, Isabel Gilbert and curator Angela Lopez Ruiz created a piece titled Gender and Dance Studies in Pioneers of Action Art I. It aimed to show the experiences of Uruguayan women by using their testimonies and archives.

Moreover, Trujillo's activism extends to the evolution of dance and freedom of expression, something that was heavily censored in Uruguay due to the dictatorship. In an interview with Laura Sand of Voyart, Trujillo explains that freedom was the biggest motivator of dance, and that her body is dance, indicating the liberating nature she achieves from dance.

== Artwork ==
=== Dance ===
==== Escalada, 1969 ====
A 35-minute dance piece regarding the construction of a new building, Alliance Francaise De Montevideo, in Uruguay. The set was a structure of metallic tubes in the center of the future theatre..

=== Choreography ===
==== Danztrio ====
Dance group who performed on Caleidoscopio. This group was created as a result of the dynamic lifestyle found in Spain, which made it very difficult for dancers like Trujillo to struggled to situate themselves.

==== Kaspar ====
In 1986, Trujillo worked on the national comedy of Kaspar.

==== Waiting for Godot ====
Trujillo participated in this version of Waiting for Godot, in which the actors are women. She starred with Susana Castro, Nelly Goitino, and Norma Salvo and given one of her first monologues. Trujillo was short listed for the Revelation Prize.

== Exhibits ==
- 1960–1985, Radical Women: Latin American Art ( Los Angeles, New York, San Pablo)

== Awards ==
- 2013 - Morosoli Award in the Performing Arts category - Dance and Ballet.

== Publications ==
In September 2012, Trujillo and artist Carina Gobbi published Cuerpo a Cuerpo (Body to Body), a biographical book.
