= Valentine Delattre =

French YouTuber

- Awards: Chevalier des Arts et des Lettres (2022–)

Valentine Delattre is a French video artist and science journalist. She hosts the YouTube channel Science de comptoir covering topics related to geology.

== Early life and education ==
She stated that she has been concerned with geology since high school.

She holds a bachelor's degree in earth and environmental sciences and a master's degree in science journalism and a master's degree in biology and evolution.

== Career ==
She is the creator of the YouTube channel Science de comptoir, where she popularises life and earth sciences. She participated in the panel ‘Telling climate stories’, on Friday 9 June 2023 at the EYE2023, during the ESMH summer school ‘Storytelling in science’. She participated at the show on Twitch Scope, organised by Arte, too.

In 2024, she participated at the SEZAM campaign, organized by the IFREMER.

== Publications ==
- Albouy, Camille; Delattre, Valentine L.; Mérigot, Bastien; Meynard, Christine N.; Leprieur, Fabien (2017). Hawkes, Lucy (ed.). "Multifaceted biodiversity hotspots of marine mammals for conservation priorities". Diversity and Distributions. 23 (6): 615–626. doi:10.1111/ddi.12556. ISSN 1366-9516.

== See also ==
- Effects of climate change on oceans
