= Vasilis Papavasileiou =

Greek theatre director and actor (1949–2025)

Vasilis Papavasileiou (Greek: Βασίλης Παπαβασιλείου; 22 February 1949 – 6 June 2025) was a Greek theatre director, actor, writer and translator. He served as artistic director of the National Theatre of Northern Greece from 1994 to 1998.

== Life and career ==
Papavasileiou was born on 22 February 1949 in Thessaloniki and grew up in Serres where his father was a public servant. He began his medical studies at the Aristotle University of Thessaloniki, but he never completed them because he turned to acting. At first Papavasileiou started studying at the Drama School of the Art Theatre, under the influence of Karolos Koun.

Papavasileiou directed more than thirty shows (works by Sophocles, Goldoni, Marivaux, Shakespeare, Pirandello, Molière, etc.) and translated various theatrical and prose texts (Goldoni, Molière, Bart, Sade, etc.). During his career, he collaborated with the National Theatre of Northern Greece and the National Theatre of Greece.

Papavasileiou received awards from the Municipality of Athens, the Municipality of Halandri, the Greek Association of Theatre and Music Critics and the Syracuse Theatre Festival in Italy. In 2016 he was awarded the Ordre des Arts et des Lettres of France. He taught at drama schools and at the Theatre Department of the School of Fine Arts of the University of Thessaloniki and was artistic director of the National Theatre of Northern Greece and Director of the Karolos Koun Art Theatre.

Papavasileiou died on 6 June 2025, at the age of 76.
