= Lansdowne Partners =

British investment firm

Lansdowne Partners (UK) LLP
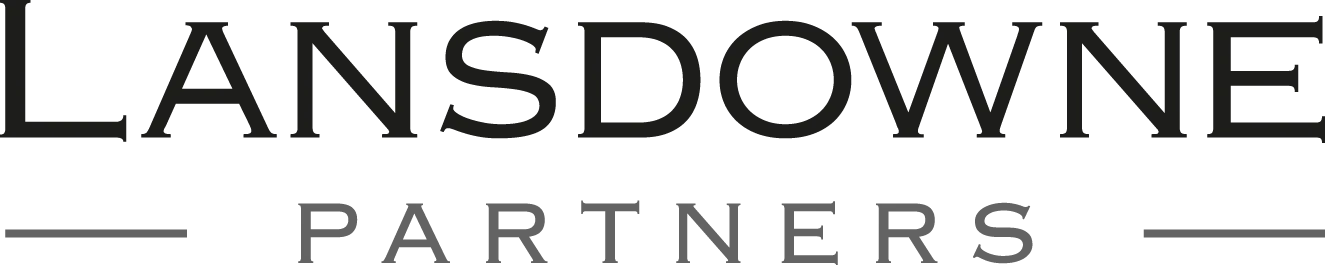
- Type: Private
- Industry: Investment management
- Founded: February 1998; 28 years ago
- Founders: Paul Ruddock; Steven Heinz
- Headquarters: London, United Kingdom
- Key people: Brian Heyworth (CEO)
- AUM: US$7 billion (June 2023)
- Owner: Morgan Stanley Investment Management (19%)
- Number of employees: 70 (June 2023)
- Website: lansdownepartners.com

Lansdowne Partners (Lansdowne) is a British investment management firm known for its investments in equities. It was one of the earliest European hedge funds with a peak of $21 billion in assets under management (AUM) in 2015. In recent years the firm has transitioned from its hedge fund strategies to long-only strategies which is in line with more mainstream asset managers.

== Background ==
In 1998, Paul Ruddock and Steven Heinz founded Lansdowne. The firm's name comes from Lansdowne Road in Holland Park where the firm was founded. Originally, it focused on using fundamental analysis to buy and sell European equities. Its flagship hedge fund launched in 2001, was the Lansdowne's UK equities fund managed by Peter Davies and Stuart Roden who previously worked at Mercury Asset Management.

Lansdowne enjoyed early success and in November 2006 when it sold a 19% stake to Morgan Stanley Investment Management, it had $12 billion in AUM across five different investment strategies.

During the 2008 financial crisis, Lansdowne's UK equities fund profited from having short positions in the financial and housing sectors. Then it bought securities at a cheap price during the crisis and had a return of 25.9% at the end of 2009 when the markets rebounded.

In 2011, Lansdowne's UK equities fund lost 20.1% due to its long positions on the financial sector. In April 2012, it was renamed to Lansdowne Developed Markets fund.

In June 2013, Ruddock retired and in 2014, Heinz stepped back from day-to-day activities of Lansdowne. However both still kept significant ownership of the firm and remains controlling shareholders with them having a 55% stake of the firm. This was cited as an obstacle in allowing the firm to further expand.

In September 2013, Lansdowne appointed Alex Snow as CEO and he brought on a team of new employees to launch an energy fund. However, in January 2017, Snow left the firm citing frustration in not being able to expand the firm as he was not fully empowered to do so. After Snow's departure, Lansdowne's financials hedge fund was closed.

In 2017, Lansdowne was considering the idea of launching a Credit fund and coming to diversify the firm's strategy since at the time the Lansdowne Developed Markets fund accounted for 80% of its AUM and even more in profits. Due to change in the market environment, it was becoming increasingly difficult to profit from stock picking. Roden who had stopped managing the fund in 2016 to run Lansdowne itself supported the decision and tried to convince the firm's management team to accept the plan. However the management team could not agree on what strategy the firm should take and in the end and the firm's original founders did not want to dilute their shares to incentivise new teams. As a result, the plan never materialized and Rodden left in September 2018 citing frustrations at the failed attempt to diversify the firm.

In July 2020, Lansdowne announced it would close its Lansdowne Developed Markets fund after a long period of poor performance. When it came to short positions, the fund had not beaten the market in aggregate since 2008. From 2016 to 2019, the fund had a compound annual loss of close to 3% while the S&P 500 had an annual gain of 9.5%. Reasons including underestimating the impact of Brexit and a $326 million loss after it bet against Glencore when its share price rebounded. In the first 6 months of 2020, the fund lost 23% due to its long positions on Airline stocks which were affected by the COVID-19 pandemic. Around half of the fund's investors converted to the Lansdowne Developed Markets Long Only Fund. At this point in time, Lansdowne already had more money in its Long-only strategies.

In May 2023, Lansdowne announced it would acquire Crux Asset Management, a long-only boutique firm.
