= Christophe Looten =

French composer (born 1958)

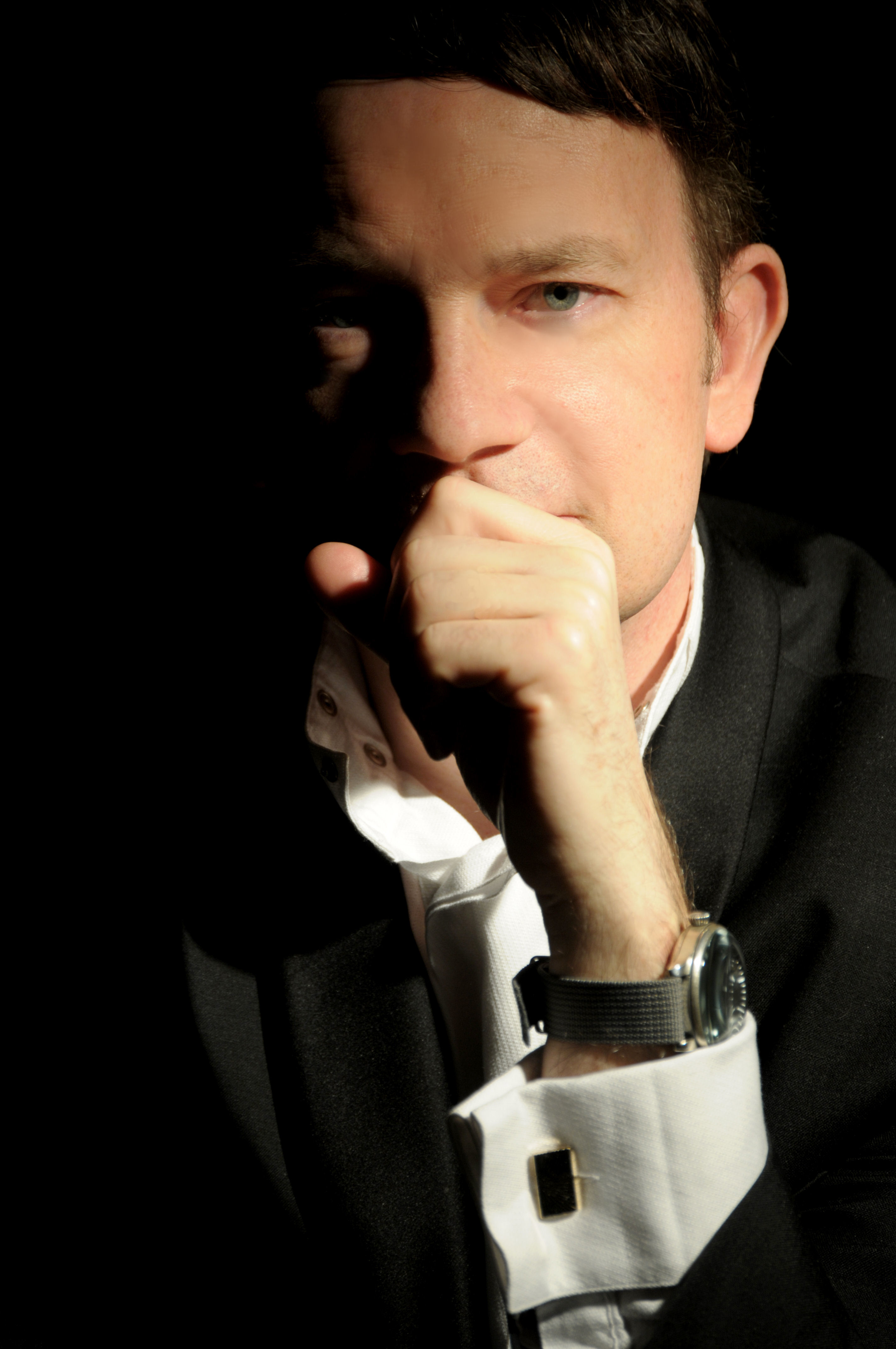
- Born: 5 April 1958 (age 67); Bergues
- Occupation: Composer

Christophe Looten (born 5 April 1958) is a French composer. Born in Bergues, he was made Chevalier des Arts et des Lettres in January 2000.

== Biography ==
Looten has been composing since the age of seven, when he began to study music with the local organist. A student of the École du Louvre, he graduated from the Conservatoire de Paris. Having won numerous prizes, he began a career as teacher, and was appointed professor of musical analysis and history at the Regional Conservatoire of Limoges, as well as conducting a course in aesthetics at the city's University. Made Pensionnaire de l'État in 1987, he spent two years in residence at the Casa de Velázquez in Madrid.

After his stay in Spain, he was awarded the Bourse Lavoisier, a grant that enabled him to go to the United States, where he obtained several fellowships. As composer in residence at Wellesley University in 1991, he won both the Prix Alea and the Prize for Composition of Besançon for his Third String Quartet.

Returning to France, he decided to devote himself entirely to composing, and went on to receive various prizes (SACEM, Jolivet, etc.). He was several times invited as composer in residence at the Round Top Festival Institute, where he composed several works: Kammerkonzert, Book of Angels and his Piano Quartet.

In 1998, he received a Fulbright Scholarship, which enabled him to return to the United States, before being appointed composer in residence in the region Nord-Pas-de-Calais for two and a half years. During this residence, numerous works were written and performed, among them Apparition de la Cité d'or, composed as the required piano piece for the Gold Medal competition. His first symphony was presented by Radio France in 2000, while his second opera, Médée de Thessalonique – on a libretto by Frédéric Lenormand – (State commission, production by la Clef des Chants in co-production with Ars Nova) was premiered at the Théâtre d'Arras in a production by Vincent Goethals, with the Ensemble Ars Nova under the direction of Philippe Nahon, the title role sung by Nicole Kuster.

In 2000, Looten was appointed Chevalier des Arts et des Lettres, while his music was performed in many countries.

The International Beethoven Festival commissioned his Litanies for soloists, choir, organ and orchestra, the Gottes Namen Litanei, which were premiered in September 2000 in Bonn Cathedral. This success led to the commission by the International Beethoven Festival of the Bonner Messe, for four soloists, mass choir, organ and orchestra. This work, composed of three parts ("Gloria", "Litanei" and "Sanctus") was destined to be premiered alongside a performance of Beethoven's Missa Solemnis. The concert took place on 23 September 2003, with Beethoven's "Gloria" and "Sanctus" being replaced by those of Looten and the mass completed by "Litanies" sung in German, according to an old tradition.

Subsequent important events have been the premiere of Sind Blitze, sind Donner in Lille, and the enormous success of the premiere at the Amsterdam Muziekgebouw of his second cello octet, Addio.

== The Bi-pentaphonic mode ==
In 1981, Looten developed a scale of sounds never before consciously used or noted: the bi-pentaphonic mode. It results from the superposition (with two common notes) of two hexaphones of identical and unretrogradable intervallic structure. The use of this scale (transposable to the 12 degrees) is a source of great richness as much on the expressive level as for the structure of the work. Constituted of ten sounds (the missing two are absolutely excluded in so far as a modulation has not reintroduced them), it gives the composer writing atonal music all the structural, rhetoric and symbolic possibilities that the tonal language offers. Looten has used this scale since 1981, the date from which he recommenced the numeration of his catalogue.

== Decorations ==
- Officer of the Order of Arts and Letters (2015)
