= Teatro Tenda di Lampugnano =

Former theatre in Milan, Italy

Teatro Tenda di Lampugnano was a 5,300-capacity indoor arena in Milan, Italy. It opened in 1983 and was demolished in 1986 when it was replaced by PalaTrussardi. It hosted concerts by artists such as Elton John, Sting, U2, James Taylor and Eric Clapton.
