= Scott Stover =

French-American American nonprofit executive

- Born: Chicago, Illinois
- Education: Columbia University, New York (BA and MBA)
- Occupation: Cultural Entrepreneur
- Website: https://scottstoverinc.com

Scott Stover is an American cultural entrepreneur and nonprofit executive. A former investment banker, he was appointed Founding Executive Director of the U.S. organization supporting the Centre Pompidou in 2005. The organization had been inactive since 1997. He opened its national office in Los Angeles in 2006, when it adopted the name Centre Pompidou Foundation; the organization now operates as American Friends of the Centre Pompidou. In 2005, Stover founded American Art Development, Inc., a U.S. based company that advises, builds, and leads cultural organizations and initiatives. Stover directs each engagement and assembles a team of specialists suited to each project. The company’s public-facing name was formerly Global Art Development Inc., later changed to Scott Stover, Inc.

== Education and finance career ==
Stover grew up in Chicago. He received an A.B. and an M.B.A. from Columbia University and pursued graduate studies in semiology and art history at the École Pratique des Hautes Études in Paris.

Before entering the cultural sector, Stover worked in international investment banking. As a vice president at Bank of America in Paris, Stover focused on secondary-loan trading and investments in France, including near-par and distressed debt. He also headed a team financing infrastructure projects in North and sub-Saharan Africa. At Westdeutsche Landesbank, he was a director in Paris and led the European Distressed Debt and Special Situations team, with responsibility for sourcing, analyzing, pricing, negotiating, and managing investments across Europe.

== Cultural sector career ==
=== Centre Pompidou Foundation ===
The organization was established in 1977 as the Georges Pompidou Art and Culture Foundation by the collector and philanthropist Dominique de Menil to support the Centre Pompidou in Paris. After a period of inactivity, Centre Pompidou president Bruno Racine initiated its relaunch in the United States in 2004. Stover was appointed Founding Executive Director in 2005. In 2006, the organization adopted the name Centre Pompidou Foundation, and Stover opened its national office in Los Angeles. A 2012 article by The Art Newspaper reported that Stover and foundation president Robert Rubin had revived the organization.

As Founding Executive Director, 2005-2013, Stover led the foundation’s strategy and operations, including membership, programs, and the development of support in the United States. The foundation acquired and encouraged gifts of American art and design for the Centre Pompidou and organized exchanges and programs for its members. During Stover’s tenure, the foundation acquired 500 major gifts worth $50 million and built a new American constituency for the museum.

=== Advising, Building, and Leading Cultural Organizations ===
Scott Stover Inc. works with cultural organizations on strategy, financial planning, governance, organizational development, and executive leadership as needed. For each project, Stover assembles a project-specific team of legal, financial, curatorial, operational, and communications specialists.

SSI’s advisory work has included UNESCO, the Yuz Foundation and Yuz Museum, the National Museum of Modern and Contemporary Art in Seoul, Réunion des Musées Nationaux–Grand Palais, and AWARE.

Stover served as Founding Executive Director of the Cahiers d’Art Institute and the Shulamit Nazarian Foundation. The latter supported the creation of the Dunya Contemporary Art Prize at the Museum of Contemporary Art Chicago, whose inaugural recipient in 2018 was Sophia Al-Maria. He joined the Su Xiaobai Foundation at its creation as Founding Executive Director; the U.S. nonprofit was established to preserve and interpret the artist’s work and archives. Su Xiaobai’s Alchemical Universe, presented by the Su Xiaobai Foundation in collaboration with LACMA, was an official Collateral Event of the 2026 Venice Biennale. He has served as a member of the Fine Art Commission of the City of Beverly Hills and on the advisory board of BASMOCA, the Basma Al Sulaiman Museum of Contemporary Art.

== Public discussions and media coverage ==
On June 16, 2016, Stover conceived and moderated an Art Basel Salon discussion, “Venture Philanthropy or Bust?” exploring new approaches to cultural giving. Rockefeller Philanthropy Advisors published an account of the conversation.

Media coverage has described Stover’s work at the Centre Pompidou Foundation and other cultural organizations. The Art Newspaper reported on his role in reviving the foundation and has covered his work in relation to museum programs and cultural projects. Forbes profiled his work on cultural strategy. The Financial Times included him in its coverage of Art Basel Cities in Buenos Aires. The New York Times quoted him in a report on Los Angeles galleries moving online, and the Los Angeles Times quoted him on changes in the city’s gallery landscape and nonprofit institutions.

=== Giving Back Is Dead ===
Created by Stover, Giving Back Is Dead is a research and conversation platform examining new and emerging approaches to cultural support beyond traditional philanthropy.

Referenced in a 2022 Art Newspaper article, The Giving Back is Dead podcast series and workshops feature artists, collectors, philanthropists, entrepreneurs, and cultural leaders involved in creating new organizations, opening independent spaces, commissioning projects, and forming cross-border partnerships. The platform considers how cultural initiatives are developed and the financial, governance, and operating decisions involved in sustaining them.

== Recognition ==
In 2013, Stover was named a Chevalier of the Ordre des Arts et des Lettres by the French Ministry of Culture.
