= Vanda Vitali =

Canadian curator

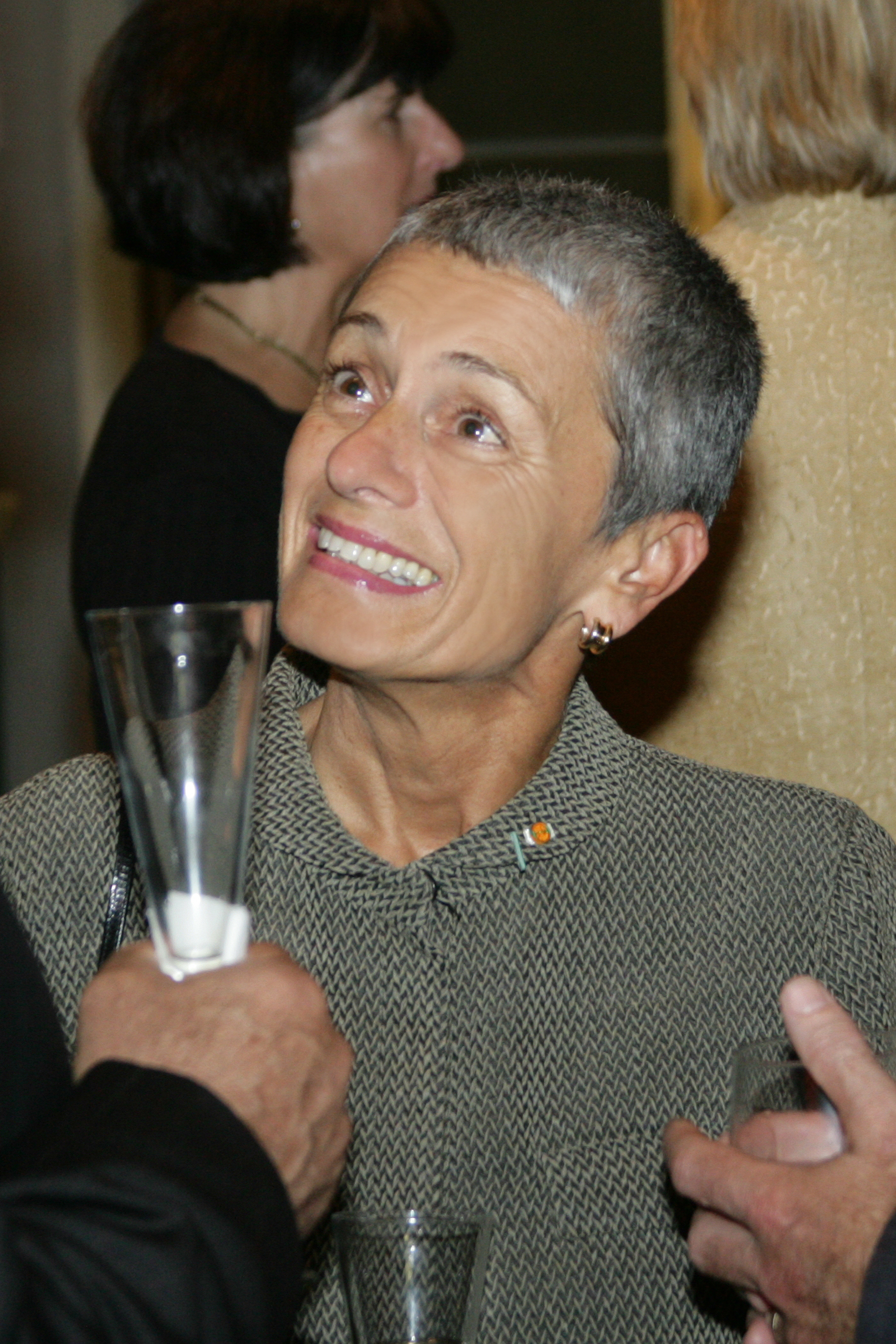
- Vitali at the Auckland War Memorial Museum in 2007
- Education: University of Toronto
- Occupation: Museum executive

Vanda Vitali is an international museum executive, who served as executive director and the Chief executive of the Canadian Museums Association from 2019 through 2021. She has been director and chief executive at the Auckland Museum in Auckland, New Zealand, from 2007 through 2010, the first and only woman ever appointed to that role. She was vice president, public programs and director, content development at the Natural History Museum of Los Angeles County, in Los Angeles, California, from 2002 to 2007.

== Career ==
Vitali studied both fine arts and physical chemistry as an undergraduate at the University of Toronto, before pursuing and receiving her Ph.D. in materials science at that university in 1985. Her research involved the application of physics to archaeological objects and works of art. This was followed by postdoctoral studies in epistemology at the École des Hautes Études en Sciences Sociales, Paris, France.

Significant positions during the 1980s and 1990s include policy adviser to the president on heritage preservation and presentation, Arab World Institute, Paris, France; and field director, Transfer of Conservation Technologies and Gallery Development, Museum of Carthage, Carthage, Tunisia and University of Toronto, Canada. Vitali was appointed advisor to the president of the Royal Ontario Museum in 1999 and held that post until her departure in 2002. She also simultaneously served as head of the Institute for Contemporary Culture at the Royal Ontario Museum. She left Canada in 2002 to become vice president of public programs and director of content development at the Natural History Museum of Los Angeles. She also held the position of executive producer of special exhibitions, programs and publications.

=== Canadian Museum Association ===
Vitali was appointed executive director and the Chief executive officer of the Canadian Museum Association in 2019. The CMA has undertaken multiple, successful initiatives under Dr. Vitali’s leadership since her arrival including the following:

- Development and execution on a new multi-year strategic plan for the CMA, which includes areas of social responsibility for the organization. The strategic plan was the result of a comprehensive consultation process with members and key stakeholders.
- Multiple museum community building initiatives, including roundtables with emerging museums professionals, research leaders, universities and government leaders across Canada.
- Strengthening professional communications and training, by expanding professional standard and contributions to The Muse, CMA annual conferences and other for a to better connect with both pan-Canadian and international experts in museums and other disciplines.
- Forging of a new unified, accountable and efficient CMA organizational structure designed to improve organizational and financial efficiency and transparency, including improved financial oversight, increased financial certainty regarding grant funding, and the adoption of new organizational technologies and work-from-home approaches through the difficult COVID-19 period.
- Incorporation of innovative government advocacy and policy development on major fronts, including the CMA’s Reconciliation Program, a new National Museums Policy Framework, and other key policy spheres in partnership with the Department of Canadian Heritage and other federal departments.

== Honours ==
- World Academy for the Future of Women and Sias International University - Sias Women's Leadership Award (2013)
- Chevalier Dans L'Ordre Des Arts et Lettres, France
- Commander of the Order of Merit for Culture, Tunisia
- AAM Muse 2007 Jim Blackaby Ingenuity Award, U.S.A.
- Bausch and Lomb Merit Award for Physics, U.S.A.

== Partial List of Publications ==
Recovering and Reimagining Canada's Museums after Covid, iPolitics, 18 May 2021. https://ipolitics.ca/2021/05/18/recovering-and-reimagining-canadas-museums-after-covid/

Column Museums Matters/Les musées, forces vives, 2020 - 2021 Muse - Canadian Museum Publication

CMA 2021, National Conference in Review / Bilan du Congrès national 2021 de l'AMC, p. 4-5. Muse Summer / Été 2021

Moving Forward - Museums and social action / Aller de l'avant - Les musées et l'action social, p 4-6. Muse Spring / Printemps 2021

What is a national museum policy and why this moment to address it? / En quoi consiste une politique nationale des musées? Pourquoi moderniser la nôtre maintenant?, p. 4-6. Muse Winter / Hiver 2021

Facing multiple crises all at once / Contre vents et marées, p. 4-5. Muse Fall / Automne 2021

Beyond now, looking wider and further / Regardons plus loin et élargissons notre perspective, p. 4-7. Muse Summer / Été 2020

Evolving our conferences to face the future / Des congrès en pleine évolution pour se tourner vers l'avenir, p. 4-7. Muse Spring / Printemps 2020

Intelligent museums, intelligent society / Des musées intelligents, une société intelligente, p. 4-8. Muse January/February - Janvier/Février 2020

ICOM Kyoto, 2019, p. 4-7. Muse November/December - Novembre/Décembre 2020

Museum matters. Editorial column, Muse, 2019-2021

Water: East, West - Then Now, Proceedings of the International Water Conference, Sedona Edge Forum, Sias International University, Zhengzhou, People's Republic of China, May 2013

Grappling with Limits: Museums and Social Inclusion in Beyond the Turnstile: Making the Case for Museum and Sustainable Values, AltaMira Press, New York, USA, 2009

Mastering a Museum Plan: Strategies for Exhibit Development, D. Houtgraaf, V. Vitali and P. Gale, Naturalis, The National Museum of Natural History, Leiden, The Netherlands, 2008

See|Hear : Museums and Imagination, Los Angeles, Natural History Museum of Los Angeles County, 2006.

On Being a University Museum: Experimentation, Imagination, Interpretation. Proceedings of the 6th International Symposium of University Museums – UMAC/ICOM. Mexico City, September 25 -October 2, 2006.

Conversations Los Angeles Leiden: Museums and Interpretation, Exhibition Catalogue, Leiden, The Netherlands, April 2006 – January 2007, Los Angeles, Natural History Museum of Los Angeles County, 2006.

Of Bait and Fishes: Museums and Cultures In Cultures of Economy – Economy of Cultures. Proceedings of the Symposium, Bayerische Amerika Akademie Munich, Germany, 2002

From Museums to Menus (and Back?): Museology and the Processes of Social and Economic Change, In Museology, Social and Economic Development. Proceedings of the Symposium, ICOM 20th General Assembly, Barcelona, Spain, 2001

Conservation of the Punic Collection at the Museum of Carthage. Part III – Transfer of Museological Technologies: Establishment of a Conservation-centred Didactic Gallery, V. Vitali, Peter Gale and Ursula M. Franklin, Journal of the Canadian Association for Conservation, 2001

Innovation Despite Constraints: Christopher Ondaatje South Asian Gallery at the Royal Ontario Museum, V. Vitali and E. Secord, Muse v.19, #1, 2001

Conservation of the Punic Collection at the Museum of Carthage. Part II – Transfer of Conservation Technology: Establishment of a Salvage Conservation Laboratory, V. Vitali and U.M. Franklin, Journal of the Canadian Association for Conservation, 2000

Data Analysis of Trace-Element Patterns of North American Native Copper Sources, G. Rapp Jr., J.D. Allert, V. Vitali and Z. Jing, In Determining Geological Sources of Artifact Copper: Source Characterization Using Trace Element Patterns, University Press of America, 2000

Culture Then, Culture Now: The real business of managing heritage, In Proceedings of the 5th International Symposium of World Heritage Cities. Santiago de Compostela, 1999.

Conservation of the Punic Collection at the Museum of Carthage. Part I – Mapping the Collection: Methodology, Classification and Assessment, V. Vitali and U.M. Franklin, Journal of the Canadian Association for Conservation, 1999

A post scriptum: Museology and Globalization What is it? Peut-on conclure? In Museology and Globalization, Proceedings of the Symposium, ICOM 19th General Assembly, Melbourne, Australia, 1998

Conservation of Cultural Heritage: An Approach to Sustainable International Development In La Conservación como factor de desarrollo en el siglo XXI, Valladolid: Fondatión del partimonio historico de Castilla y Leon, 1998

Remembering the People: Unity and Diversity within the Global Community, V. Vitali and P. A. Gale, In Museology and Globalization, ICOFOM Study Series ISS 29, 1998
