= Paul Ruddock =

British businessman

Sir Paul Ruddock FSA
- Born: Paul Martin Ruddock; 28 August 1958 (age 67)
- Education: King Edward's School, Birmingham
- Alma mater: Mansfield College, Oxford
- Occupations: Businessman and philanthropist
- Known for: Co-founder of Lansdowne Partners

Sir Paul Martin Ruddock, FSA (born 28 August 1958) is a British businessman, philanthropist and patron of the arts. He is a co-founder and a former CEO of Lansdowne Partners. In addition he is a former chairman of the Victoria & Albert Museum and chairman of the University of Oxford Endowment.

== Early life and education ==
Ruddock was born on 28 August 1958 in Solihull, West Midlands, England. He was educated at King Edward's School, Birmingham, a private all-boys school, from 1969 to 1976. He read jurisprudence at Mansfield College, Oxford, where he received a first class Bachelor of Arts (BA) degree in 1980: as per tradition, his BA was promoted to a Master of Arts (MA Oxon) in 1984. He has been a Bancroft Fellow at Mansfield College since 2008.

== Personal life ==
Since 1991, he has been married to Jill Shaw Ruddock, originally of Baltimore, Maryland; the couple have two daughters. Jill Ruddock is a board member at the Bowdoin College Museum of Art and a trustee of Mousetrap Theatre Projects. She is founder and chairman of the Second Half of Your Life Foundation, author of the book 'The Second Half of Your Life' and a former member of the board of the Donmar Warehouse theatre.

Ruddock was knighted in the 2012 New Year's Honours List for services to the arts and philanthropy. At the time of the award, some commentators called for the New Years Honours List to be made more transparent, particularly where, as in the case of Ruddock, recipients are political party donors.

Ruddock himself provided written testimony on the subject to a House of Commons Public Administration Select Committee, in which he advocated that the honours system explain the basis for each individual award. Ruddock was one of 33,000 individuals to invest in film partnerships that were later contested successfully by HMRC.

== Business career ==
Ruddock is a former CEO of Lansdowne Partners, an alternative investment management firm he co-founded in 1998. He retired from Lansdowne in March 2013. He was a managing director and head of international business at Schroders & Co. Inc. (1984–1998) and was at Goldman Sachs from 1980 to 1984.

In April 2013, Ruddock was awarded an 'Outstanding Contribution' award for his contribution to the hedge fund industry at the HFM Week awards. In November 2013 he was given a Hall of Fame Lifetime Achievement award by The Compliance Register. His wealth has been estimated to be about £270m. He is believed to have donated £570,000 to the Conservative Party between 2003 and 2011.

In October 2015 the Chancellor of the Exchequer appointed Ruddock as a Commissioner of the National Infrastructure Commission, an independent body that enables long-term decision making in UK infrastructure projects. The commission is chaired by Lord Adonis. In November 2016, Sir Paul stepped down from the commission.

== Philanthropy and the arts ==
Ruddock is closely involved with numerous charitable institutions and is a noted philanthropist in the arts and in education.

Ruddock served as chairman of the Victoria & Albert Museum from 2007 to November 2015. He was made an honorary senior research fellow at the Museum and is a trustee of the V&A Foundation. He is also a former chairman of the museum's Trustee Finance and Development Committees. He was the lead private donor for the renovation of the V&A's Renaissance and Medieval galleries, a £32m project and the museum's largest in more than 100 years.

At the British Museum, Sir Paul and his wife Jill funded the renovation of the European Medieval gallery. In March 2014 the British Museum opened a second gallery funded by the couple: The Sir Paul and Lady Ruddock Gallery of Sutton Hoo and Europe 300–1100, an early medieval collection that includes objects from the Sutton Hoo ship burial in Suffolk. Sir Paul was appointed by the Prime Minister as a Trustee of the Museum in October 2016. Ruddock's tenure as a Trustee concluded in July 2024, after which the Museum named Sir Paul an Honorary Senior Research Fellow.

In January 2011, Ruddock was appointed a Trustee of the Metropolitan Museum of Art, New York, where he serves on the merchandise, acquisitions and external affairs committee. He is also Co-Chair of the International Council.

In collaboration with King Edward's School, Birmingham, Sir Paul and Jill Ruddock funded a new performing arts centre, which the couple formally opened in 2012.

Ruddock is an ambassador for AfriKids, through which he has been involved in several educational and charitable projects in Africa. He has donated substantial funds and helped the charity connect with other donors.

Ruddockwas elected a Fellow of the Society of Antiquaries of London (FSA) on 11 November 2010. He is a former trustee of the Samuel Courtauld Trust and a former chairman of the Gilbert Trust for the Arts. He continues to actively support the Courtauld Institute of Art. His further charitable involvement includes commitments to the Donmar Warehouse and The National Trust.

In April 2014, Ruddock was appointed chair of the World War I Cathedral Repairs Commission.

Sir Paul is a member of the J. Paul Getty President's International Council and a member of the Bard Graduate Center's advisory board.

=== Awards for philanthropy ===
Ruddock is the UK recipient of the 2014 Montblanc de la Culture Arts Patronage Award, established by the Montblanc Cultural Foundation to recognise patrons of the arts who have made exceptional contributions to artists and their work. Winners are chosen from a shortlist by an international jury of artists and art influencers. Past recipients of the award include the Prince of Wales, Russian maestro Valery Gergiev, American musician Quincy Jones, Italian architect Renzo Piano and Japanese artist Yoko Ono.

In January 2015, Ruddock was appointed chairman of the University of Oxford Endowment fund, following his appointment to its board in September 2014.

In May 2015, Ruddock was made a "Chevalier dans Ordre des Arts et Lettres" for services to French art, awarded by the French Government's Minister of Culture.

In October 2015, Ruddock was given a Lifetime Achievement in Philanthropy Award by Spear's, the London-based wealth management, business and culture magazine.

In April 2016, Ruddock was given an "Outstanding Patron" award by the Iris Foundation, an organisation created in 1997 to recognize scholars, patrons, and professionals who have made outstanding contributions to the study and appreciation of the decorative arts.

In May 2019 he received an honorary doctorate (Doctor of Humane Letters) by Bowdoin College, Maine, for philanthropy and services to the arts.

In July 2019 he received an honorary doctorate (Doctor of the University) by the University of Birmingham, UK, for philanthropy and services to the arts.
