= Manal Ataya =

Emirati museum professional

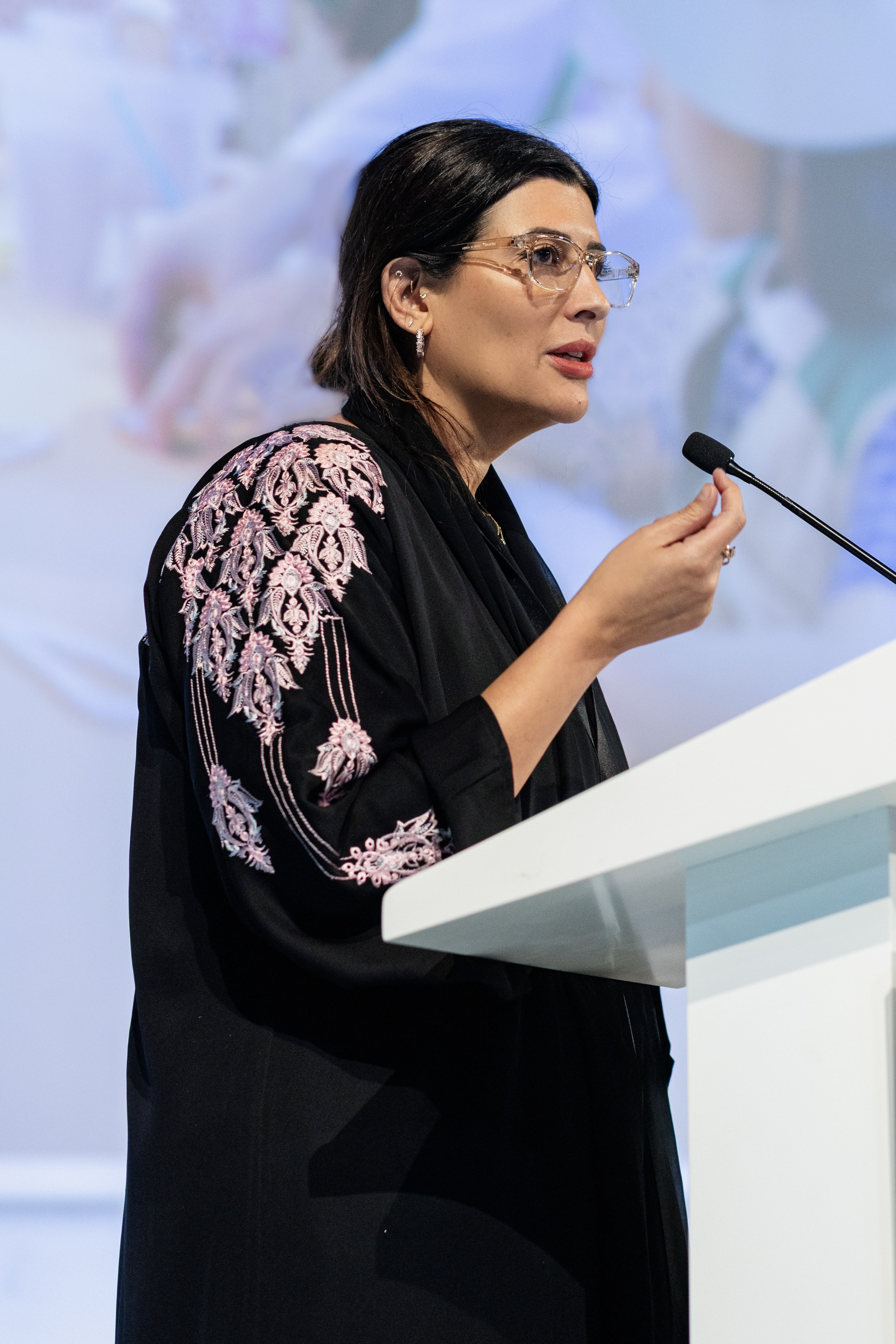
Manal Ataya

Manal Ataya (born 1979) is an Emirati museology professional associated with the Sharjah Museums Authority (SMA) of the United Arab Emirates, where she held senior leadership roles including the position of Director General of the museums authority. Later in June 2023, she was appointed an advisor to the SMA by the Ruler of Sharjah His Highness Sheikh Dr Sultan Bin Mohammed Al Quasimi.

She has been responsible for the opening of six new museums and four major refurbishment projects across sixteen such institutions. She provides strategic forward planning, advises on international museum best practices and standards and has undertaken policy supervision and direct supervision of such key institutions. Her focus area of work has been the preservation Islamic culture and history, as well as contemporary art, maritime history, archaeology and science ensconcing the directives of the Emirate of Sharjah for future museums and cultural heritage related projects.

== Early life and education ==
Ataya was born in Dubai in 1979. She attended Hamilton College. According to Sharjah Art Foundation, she undertook graduate study in museum studies at Harvard University.

== Career ==
=== Sharjah Museums Authority ===
Ataya joined the Sharjah Museums Authority in 2006 and served as its founding deputy director before becoming Director General in 2008. In that role, she oversaw museum operations and public programming across SMA museums in Sharjah. Her work has helped highlight the Emirate of Sharjah's cultural and archeological history spanning from the stone age to contemporary times. During her tenure she as founding member and also as Director General of the Sharjah Museums Authority, has overseen development of new museums along with the re-development and improvement of various existing Emirati museums in the state of Sharjah (founded by the ruler of Sharjah) into more modern, progressive museums with virtual tours and other technological integrations. In June 2023, the Ruler of Sharjah appointed her advisor to the Sharjah Museums Authority.

=== Public speaking and cultural diplomacy ===
Ataya has spoken publicly on museums and cultural exchange, including remarks reported by the Emirates News Agency (WAM). In her pursuit for research, conservation and publication of Sharjah's heritage Ataya has been coordinating with various nodal bodies, investment agencies and cultural agencies like that of Shurooq (Sharjah Investment Development Authority) and local stakeholders like Sharjah Institute of Heritage, Sharjah Art Foundation, Sharjah Archaeology Authority.

She co-facilitated "Leadership & Wellbeing: A Micro-Series," a women-only initiative aimed at improving emotional literacy and stress management in the workplace.

== Publications ==
Ataya has contributed writing on heritage and museum practice. She co-authored a chapter titled "Heritage and Community Involvement: The Case of Sharjah Fort (Al Hisn) Museum" (with Hazelle Page) in Community Heritage in the Arab Region: Values and Practices (2022).

== Honors and recognition ==
In 2018, Ataya was named a Chevalier of the Order of Arts and Letters (France). In 2022, she was awarded the Order of Merit of the Federal Republic of Germany. Ataya was included in an Arabian Business list of "inspiring leaders in the Middle East".
