= Linden Lin =

Taiwanese publisher

- 林載爵
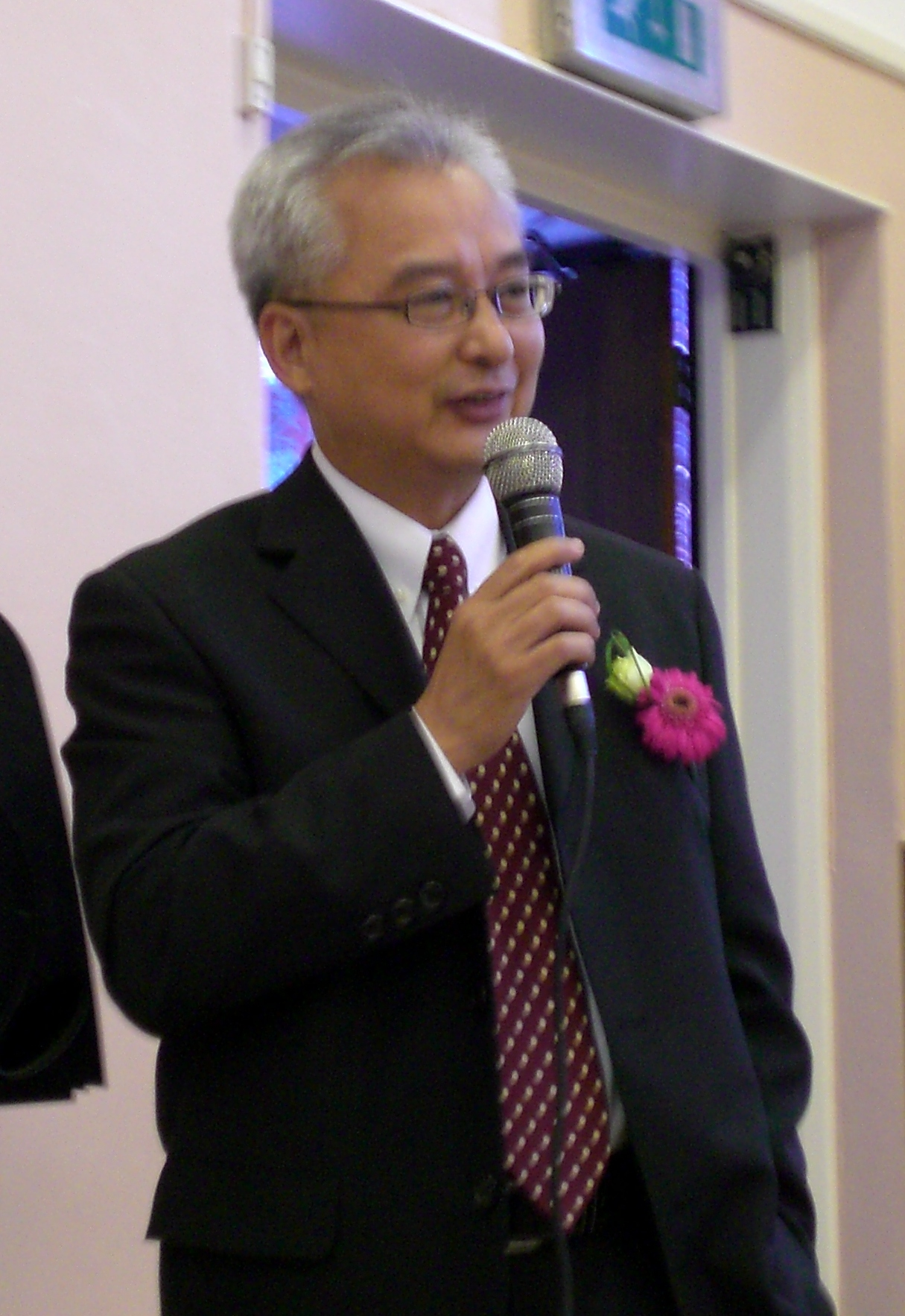
- Born: 16 June 1951 (age 74)
- Awards: Ordre des Arts et des Lettres

Linden Lin or Lin Tsai-chueh (Chinese: 林載爵; born 16 June 1951) is a Taiwanese publisher. He is the publisher and editorial director of Linking Publishing Company and former chairman of the Taipei International Book Exhibition (TIBE). Lin was awarded the Ordre des Arts et des Lettres (Chevalier) of France in 2011, for his contributions to the promotion of French literature and culture in Taiwan.
