= Giuseppe Scaraffia =

Italian writer and professor

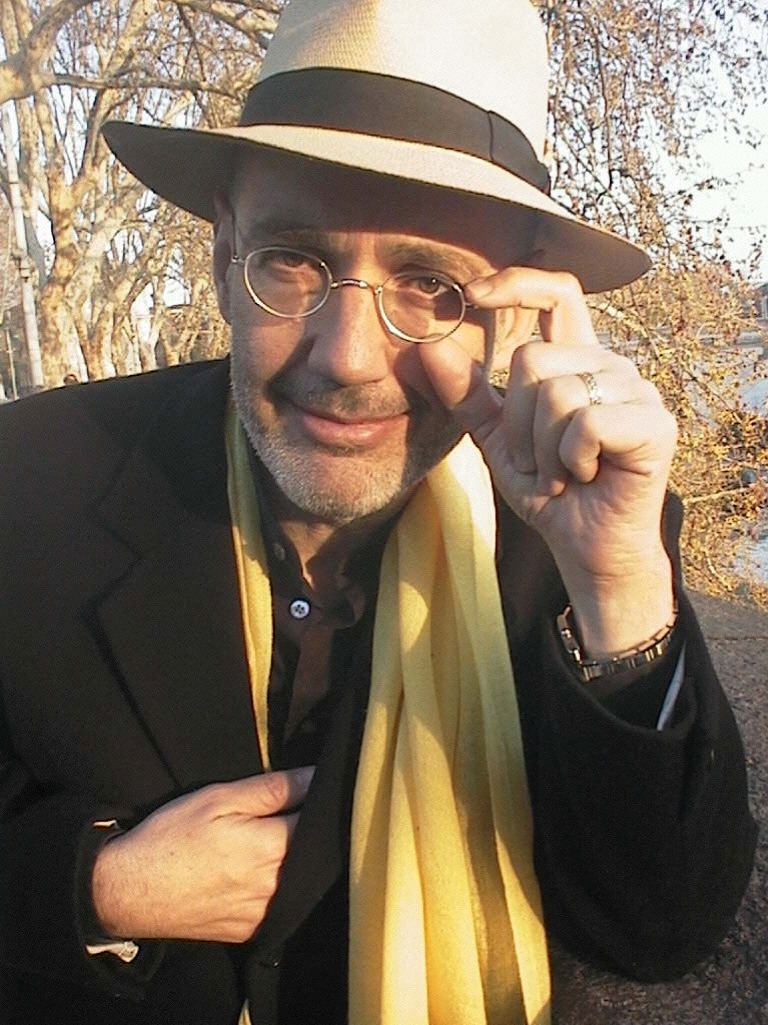
Image of Giuseppe Scaraffia

Giuseppe Scaraffia is an Italian writer and professor.

== Biography ==
Giuseppe Scaraffia was born in Turin, Italy, in 1950. He graduated in Philosophy at the University of Milan with a thesis on the idea of happiness in Diderot. He has taught French Literature at the Sapienza University of Rome since 1976. Over the years his research has focused in particular on the great myths of seduction of the 19th century, from the figure of the femme fatale to that of the tall dark stranger.

In 2000 he was nominated Chevalier de l'Ordre des Arts et des Lettres, an institution which is directly managed by the French Ministry of Culture.

In 2008 he was awarded the "Grinzane – Beppe Fenoglio" special prize for the book "Cortigiane" (2008).

With his partner Silvia Ronchey he wrote and hosted cultural programmes for RAI television collaborating with the national channels RAI SAT, RAI 1, RAI 2 and RAI 3. Among these, "L'altra edicola" (a cultural programme broadcast by RAI 2 in the 1990s). Always with Silvia Ronchey he also did a series of interviews to great "masters" of culture like Ernst Jünger, Claude Lévi-Strauss, James Hillman, David Lodge, Keith Waldrop and Jean-Pierre Vernant.

== Selected bibliography ==
Scaraffia has published 14 essays and two novels, as well as having edited the Italian translations of more than 20 works by foreign authors (from Proust to Mérimée, from Stendhal to Maupassant).

- G. Scaraffia, Dizionario del dandy, Bari, Laterza, 1981. (title translation: Dandy's dictionary)
- G. Scaraffia, Scritti su Diderot, Roma, Bulzoni, 1983. (title translation: Written about Diderot)
- G. Scaraffia, Marcel Proust: Alla ricerca di Swan, Pordenone, Studio Tesi, 1986. (title translation: Marcel Proust: searching for Swan)
- G. Scaraffia, La donna fatale, Palermo, Sellerio, 1987. (title translation: Fatal lady)
- G. Scaraffia, Infanzia, Palermo, Sellerio, 1987. (title translation: Childhood)
- G. Scaraffia, Il mantello di Casanova, Palermo, Sellerio, 1989. (title translation: Casanova's coat)
- G. Scaraffia, Torri d’avorio, Palermo, Sellerio, 1994. (title translation: Ivory towers)
- G. Scaraffia, Miti minori, Palermo, Sellerio, 1995. (title translation: Smaller myths)
- G. Scaraffia, Il bel tenebroso, Palermo, Sellerio, 1999. (title translation: Dark stranger)
- G. Scaraffia, Gli ultimi dandies, Palermo, Sellerio, 2002. (title translation: Late dandies)
- G. Scaraffia, Scrivere è un trucco del cuore, Milano, Ponte delle Grazie, 2002. (title translation: To write as a heart-trick)
- G. Scaraffia, Sorridi Gioconda!, Milano, Mondadori, 2005. (title translation: Smile, Mona Lisa!)
- G. Scaraffia, Cortigiane, Milano, Mondadori, 2008. (title translation: Courtesan)
- G. Scaraffia, Femme Fatale, Firenze, Vallecchi, 2009. (title translation: Femme Fatale)
- G. Scaraffia, Le signore della notte. Storie di prostitute, artisti e scrittori, Milano, Mondadori, 2011. (title translation: Queens of the night. Story of prostitutes, artists and writers)
- G. Scaraffia, Il romanzo della Costa Azzurra, Milano, Bompiani, 2013. (title translation: The novel of the French Riviera)
- G. Scaraffia, Gli ultimi giorni di Mata Hari, Torino, UTET, 2015. (title translation: The last days of Mata Hari)
- G. Scaraffia, Il demone della frivolezza, Palermo, Sellerio, 2016. (title translation: The demon of triviality)
