= Diane Denoir =

Uruguayan singer

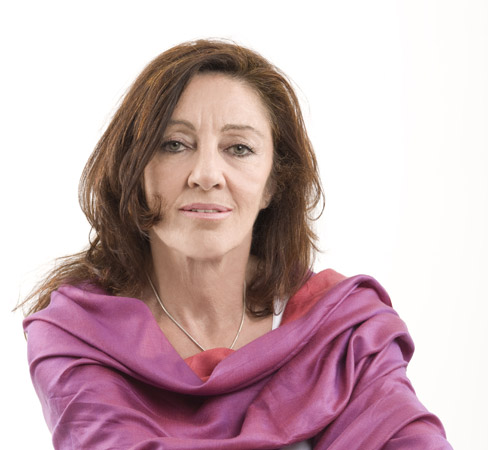
- Diane Denoir
- Born: Diana Reches Mehler; 21 January 1947 (age 79); Montevideo
- Occupation: Singer

Diana Reches Mehler (born 21 January 1947), more commonly known by her pseudonym Diane Denoir, is an Uruguayan singer.

== Biography ==
Diane Denoir was born to two Austrian immigrants to Uruguay in Montevideo, the nation's capital, on 21 January 1947. She grew up and spent her adolescence in the Pocitos neighborhood of Montevideo.

In the winter of 1966, she was one of the promoters of the Conciertos Beat, a series of innovative shows in which music from different genres was mixed with sketches and the reading of texts, performed at the Solís and Odeón Theaters. It was at these performances that Denoir chose her pseudonym and performed accompanied by Eduardo Mateo (after meeting him at a bar) on the guitar, Roberto Galletti on drums, and Antonio 'Lobito' Lagarde on bass guitar. As the band performed, Denoir sang songs in English, Portuguese, and French, sometimes changing the languages the songs were originally written in (for example, she sang The Girl from Ipanema in English). The media reaction to Denoir's debut was very receptive.
