= Isabelle Dhordain =

French journalist (1959–2021)

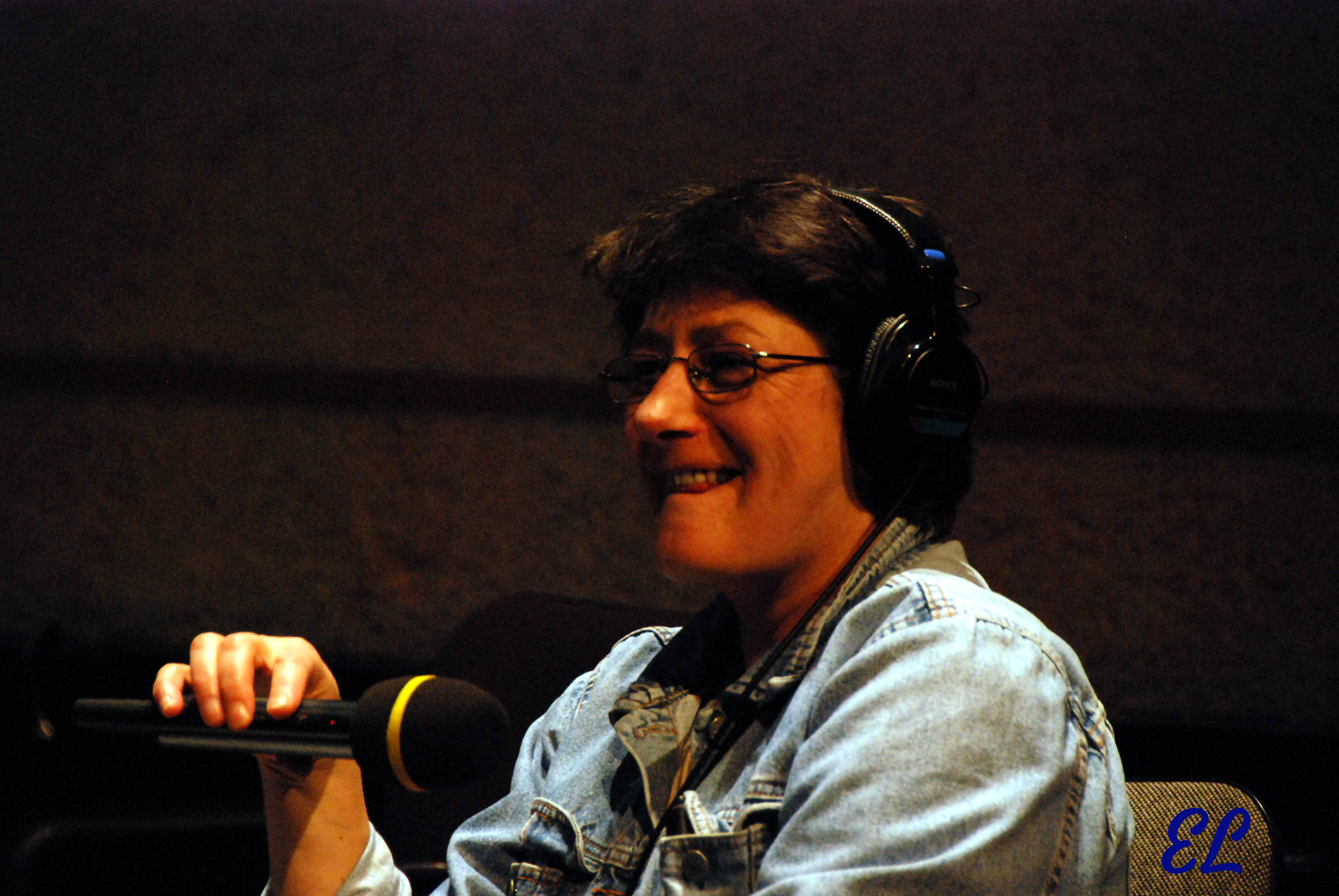
- Isabelle Dhordain
- Born: 11 May 1959; Paris, France
- Died: 21 February 2021 (aged 61)
- Occupation: journalist

Isabelle Dhordain (French pronunciation: [izabɛl dɔʁdɛ̃]; 11 May 1959 – 21 February 2021) was a French journalist and music critic.

== Early life and education ==
Her parents were Roland Dhordain, creator of ORTF and France Inter, and Édith Lansac, Actor and producer at France Culture.

== Career ==
Dhordain was the presenter of the radio program "Le Pont des artistes" on France Inter from its inception in 1988 until 2013.

== Awards and honors ==
- In 2011, she was made a Knight of Ordre des Arts et des Lettres.
- In 2016, she was made a Knight of the Ordre national du Mérite.
