= Graciela Figueroa =

Uruguayan dancer

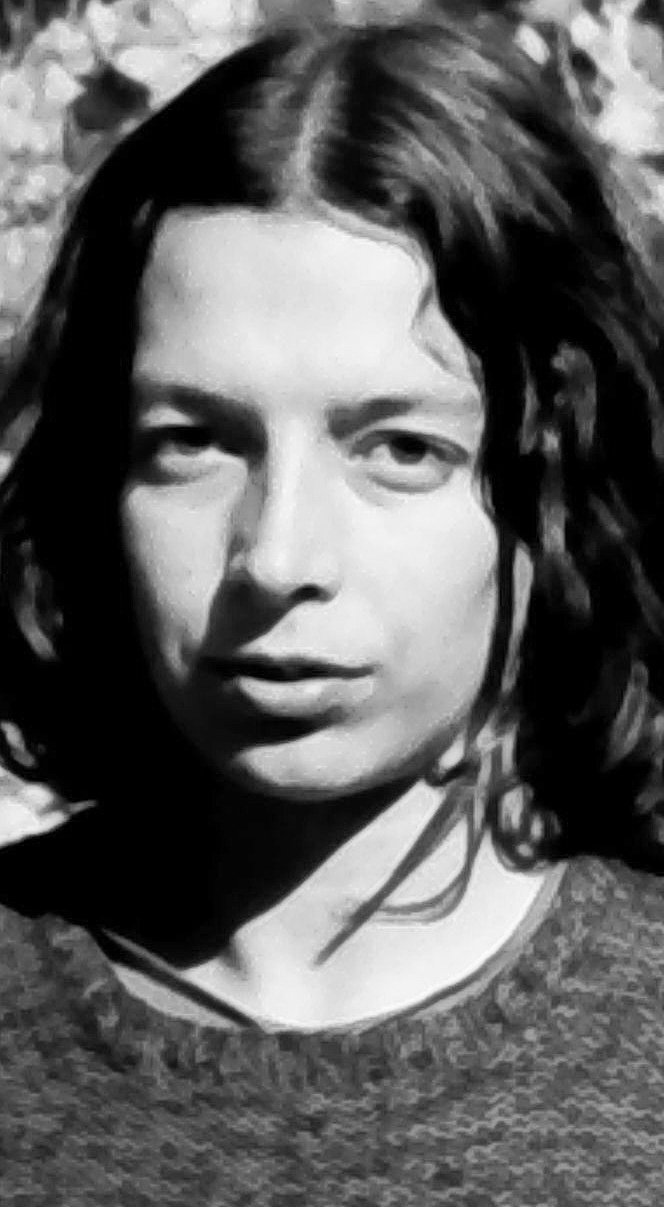
- Born: Graciela Figueroa; January 15, 1944 (age 82); Montevideo, Uruguay
- Occupations: dancer and choreographer

Graciela Figueroa (born January 15, 1944, in Montevideo) is a dancer and choreographer from Uruguay. In 2007 Figueroa worked as choreographer in the musical Maré, Nossa História de Amor a free adaptation of the tragedy of Romeo and Juliet translated to the harsh life in Favela da Maré, one of largest and most violent slums in Rio de Janeiro. The show starred Cristina Lago, Vinícius D'Black and Marisa Orth.
