= Rubén Marshall Tikalova =

Mexican advisor

Rubén Marshall Tikalova SMOM
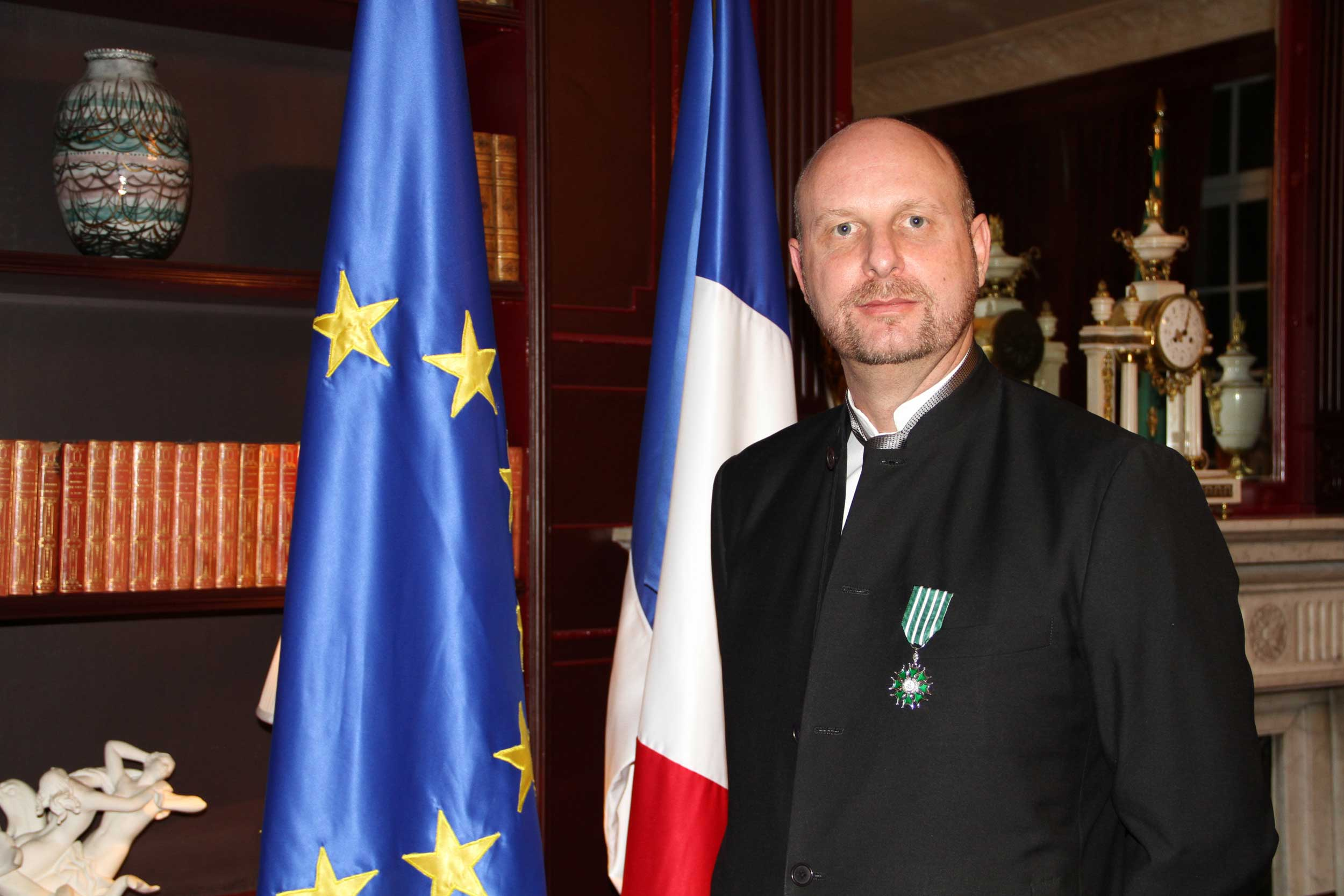
- Education: Bachelor of Arts in Management Engineering, Bachelor degree of Science in Mechanical Engineering
- Alma mater: Claremont McKenna College, California, University of Columbia, New York
- Occupations: Director of Brokerage and International Advisor, United States Foreign Trade Institute
- Years active: 2003 to date
- Organization: United States Foreign Trade Institute
- Awards: Knight of Magistral Grace of the Sovereign Military Order of Malta & Knight of the Order of Arts and Letters of France

Ruben Jose Marshall Tikalova SMOM (born 1969, in Mexico City) is Director of Brokerage and International Advisor of the United States Foreign Trade Institute since 2022. He was founder of the contemporary arts and lifestyle magazine FAHRENHEITº, and was its editorial director from 2003 to 2017.

== Trajectory ==
Marshall Tikalova received his secondary and higher education in the United States, first, in the high school Blair Academy, New Jersey: Cum Laude. He later graduated with honors as Bachelor of Arts in Management Engineering by Claremont McKenna College, California. Soon after he received the bachelor's degree of science in mechanical engineering from the Columbia University, New York City.

He was interested in contemporary art and culture and traveled to Europe to learn about the subject. In France he studied French language and civilization at the Sorbonne in Paris. In this period he became interested in the artistic phenomenon. From his role as creator he became part of the workshop of French sculptor Gerard Ramon, known to have studied with Marcel Gimond, the pupil of Auguste Renoir. Later, he took several diplomas of morphology, drawing, painting and sculpture at L'ecole Nationale Superieure des Beaux-Arts in Paris and diploma studies in Art History for University of Cambridge in England, focusing on the work of British sculptor Henry Moore, in the same university he was familiarized with the work of the poet and engraver William Blake.

He sculpted several pieces in which mannequins were the work of art, presenting in 2005 a selection of his work in the solo exhibition entitled Between the spiritual and the mundane in Praxis Gallery, Mexico City (since 2008 Alfredo Ginocchio Gallery), receiving diverse reviews for his use of familiar objects to express his search of volume in sculpture.

In October 2003 he founded, together with colleagues from the Mexican artistic and cultural world, the contemporary arts and lifestyle magazine FAHRENHEITº, being its editorial director since then. This publication has been studied and presented as part of the Mexican magazines of art and culture of the first two decades of the Twenty First Century. For several years he was also head of the column "Chess. Bishop and Aleph" which appeared in the bimonthly printed magazine.

As editorial director of FAHRENHEIT°, he made the transit of the publication to its digital version, launching in 2009 its website in French, English and Spanish, and with the time it became available in other languages. FAHRENHEIT° is also a channel of contemporary arts and lifestyle news, which has begun to venture into the field of international news.

From 2013 to 2016 he was also the editorial director of the weekly cultural section “FAHRENHEITº”, published in the national newspaper Excélsior. During its history (d. March 18, 1917), Excélsior has given voice to various characters of the Mexican cultural environment. The publications arising from its pages (supplements, sections and magazines), among which is Plural, the literary magazine run by the Mexican writer, Nobel Prize in Literature, Octavio Paz, from its origin (October, 1971) to the “Excelsior beat” when he left the direction of the magazine (July, 1976), founding then the magazine Vuelta, although Plural was published until December 1994.

As a member of the Mexican cultural world, Marshall Tikalova has been part of selection committees in national and international art competitions, such as Miradas Cruzadas in collaboration with the Alliance Française in Mexico, the French Embassy in Mexico, the Image Center, the National Center of the Arts, the National Council for Culture and Arts (currently Secretariat of Culture) and the Museum of Mexico City, or Caminos de la Libertad, in collaboration with Fundación Azteca. He has recently being part of the 7th generation's faculty from Luxurylab Institute, in Mexico City.

In 2010 he was invited to join the Board of Directors of the Federation of Alliances Françaises in Mexico, and in 2011 he founded with the French Ambassador in Mexico and Marie-Jo Paz, widow of Octavio Paz, the Circle Victor Hugo for the Arts in Mexico, to promote cultural exchange between France and Mexico and the Francophonie, and serves as its president. In 2014 Mexico became observer country of the Organisation Internationale de la Francophonie (OIF). In his role as advisor, he currently serves as the Director of Brokerage and International Advisor from the United States Foreign Trade Institute.

== Honors ==
- Knight of Magistral Grace of the Sovereign Order of Malta (Sovereign Military Hospitaller Order of Saint John of Jerusalem, of Rhodes and of Malta). Marshall Tikalova received the Investiture as Knight of Magistral Grace on June 24, 2021, at the Apostolic Nunciature to Mexico.
- Knight of the Order of Arts and Letters of France. This recognition rewards, as the Order says, "the peoples who have distinguished themselves by their creations in the literary or artistic domain or the contribution they have made to the splendor of the arts and letters in France and in the world", and was given by the Government of France after having been authorized by decree of Felipe Calderon, President of Mexico in the Official Journal of the Federation.
