= List of lighthouses in Uruguay =

This is a list of lighthouses in Uruguay.

== Lighthouses ==
Name	Image	Year built	Location & coordinates	Class of light	Focal height	NGA number	Admiralty number	Range nml
Aéreo de Rincón del Bonete Lighthouse		1938	Rincón del Bonete Lake; 32°49′58.5″S 56°25′30.0″W	inactive since 1994	7 metres (23 ft)	n/a	n/a	n/a
Arroyo Riachuelo East Mole Lighthouse		n/a	34°27′32.0″S 57°43′59.9″W	Fl R 5s.	107 metres (351 ft)	19253	G0745.6	5
Cabo Polonio Lighthouse		1881	Cabo Polonio; 34°24′19.3″S 53°46′40.2″W	Fl W 12s.	40 metres (130 ft)	19024	G0662	22
Cabo Santa Maria Lighthouse		1874	La Paloma; 34°40′05.5″S 54°09′10.6″W	Fl W 60s.	42 metres (138 ft)	19032	G0668	20
Colonia del Sacramento Lighthouse		1857	Colonia del Sacramento; 34°28′22.3″S 57°51′08.4″W	Fl R 9s.	34 metres (112 ft)	19260	G0756	11
El Cerro de Montevideo Lighthouse		1802	Cerro de Montevideo; 34°53′18.5″S 56°15′35.7″W	Fl (3) W 10s.	148 metres (486 ft)	19184	G0702	19
Escollera Sarandí Lighthouse	Image	n/a	Montevideo; 34°54′48.2″S 56°13′20.1″W	Fl R 3s.	22 metres (72 ft)	19136	G0704	10
Farallón Island Lighthouse		1876	Isla de Farallón; 34°29′05.4″S 57°55′05.7″W	Fl (2) W 10s.	26 metres (85 ft)	19280	G0762	10
Isla de Flores Lighthouse		1828	Isla de Flores; 34°56′45.3″S 55°55′57.7″W	Fl (2) W 16s.	37 metres (121 ft)	19080	G0690	19
Isla Gorriti Lighthouse	Image	n/a	Gorriti Island; 34°57′36.3″S 54°58′13.2″W	Fl G 5s.	9 metres (30 ft)	19056	G0683	5
Isla de Lobos Lighthouse		1906	Isla de Lobos; 35°01′28.3″S 54°53′00.2″W	Fl W 5s.	66 metres (217 ft)	19040	G0676	23
Isla Martín García Lighthouse		n/a	Martín García Island; 34°11′24.5″S 58°15′24.8″W	Fl (2) Y 10s.	10 metres (33 ft)	19292	G0791	6
La Panela Lighthouse	Image	1984	Río de la Plata; 34°54′54.0″S 56°26′54.0″W	Fl (4) 10s.	17 metres (56 ft)	19196	G0736	8
Maria Victoria Lighthouse	Image	n/a	La Aguada y Costa Azul; 34°38′44.2″S 54°09′14.6″W	Fl WR 4s.	7 metres (23 ft)	19028	G0664	white: 8 red: 6
Montevideo Catedral Lighthouse	Image	1862	Montevideo; 34°54′25.7″S 56°12′14.6″W	inactive since 1910	23 metres (75 ft) (tower)	n/a	n/a	n/a
Monumento Artigas Lighthouse	Image	n/a	Punta del Diablo; 34°02′40.1″S 53°32′03.0″W	Fl W 5s.	15 metres (49 ft)	19016	G0658	8
Piedra Diamante Lighthouse	Image	n/a	Río de la Plata; 34°25′26.8″S 57°57′41.0″W	Fl (2) W 6s.	18 metres (59 ft)	19284	G0789	10
Piriápolis Outer Breakwater Lighthouse		n/a	Piriápolis; 34°52′27.2″S 55°16′57.3″W	Fl R 5s.	10 metres (33 ft)	19076	G0689.1	8
Punta Brava Lighthouse		1876	Punta Carretas; 34°56′06.8″S 56°09′38.1″W	Al Fl WR 10s.	21 metres (69 ft)	19124	G0700	15
Puerto del Buceo East Breakwater Lighthouse	Image	n/a	Buceo; 34°54′33.5″S 56°07′35.0″W	Fl R 5s.	7 metres (23 ft)	19108	G0698	10
Puerto del Buceo West Breakwater Lighthouse	Image	n/a	Buceo; 34°54′32.8″S 56°07′39.7″W	Fl G 5s.	13 metres (43 ft)	19104	G0696	10
Punta del Este Lighthouse		1860	Punta del Este 34°58′07.7″S 54°57′05.8″W	Fl W 8s.	44 metres (144 ft)	19044	G0682	21
Punta del Este West Breakwater Lighthouse	Image	n/a	Punta del Este; 34°57′35.6″S 54°57′04.0″W	Fl R 5s.	7 metres (23 ft)	19048	G0684	8
Punta José Ignacio Lighthouse		1877	Maldonado Department; 34°50′45.9″S 54°37′58.8″W	Fl W 2s.	32 metres (105 ft)	19036	G0672	15
Punta Negra Lighthouse	Image	n/a	Punta Negra; 34°54′13.4″S 55°15′37.1″W	Fl W 5s.	17 metres (56 ft)	19068	G0688	7
Punta Palmar Lighthouse		1984	Punta del Diablo; 34°04′01.5″S 53°33′04.1″W	Fl W 6s.	21 metres (69 ft)	19020	G0660	10
Sebastian Cabot Lighthouse		n/a	San Juan River; 34°16′37.7″S 57°59′02.6″W	Fl G 5s.	5 metres (16 ft)	19287	G0764	5
Yacht Club Uruguayo Lighthouse	Image	1939	Buceo; 34°54′35.6″S 56°07′51.4″W	Fl W 4s.	40 metres (130 ft)	19112	G0699	8

== See also ==
- Lists of lighthouses and lightvessels
