= Fuerte San Miguel (Uruguay) =

Coordinates: 33°41′22″S 53°32′20″W

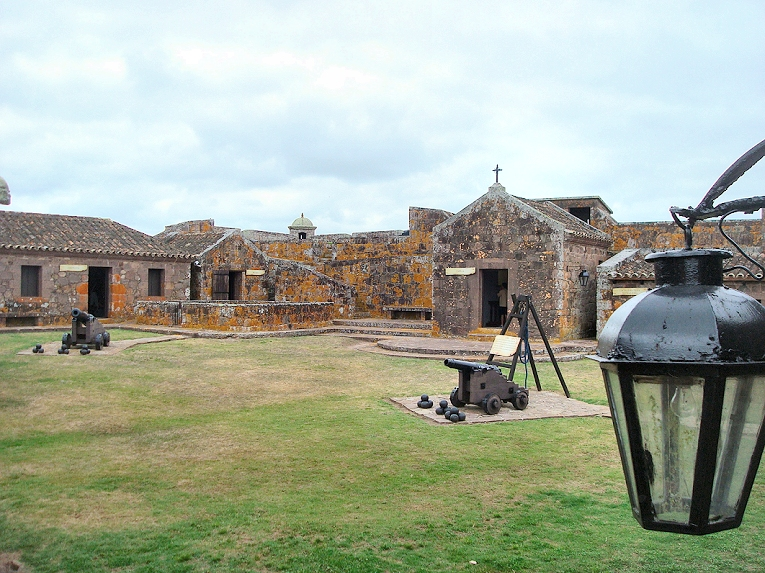
Fuerte San Miguel

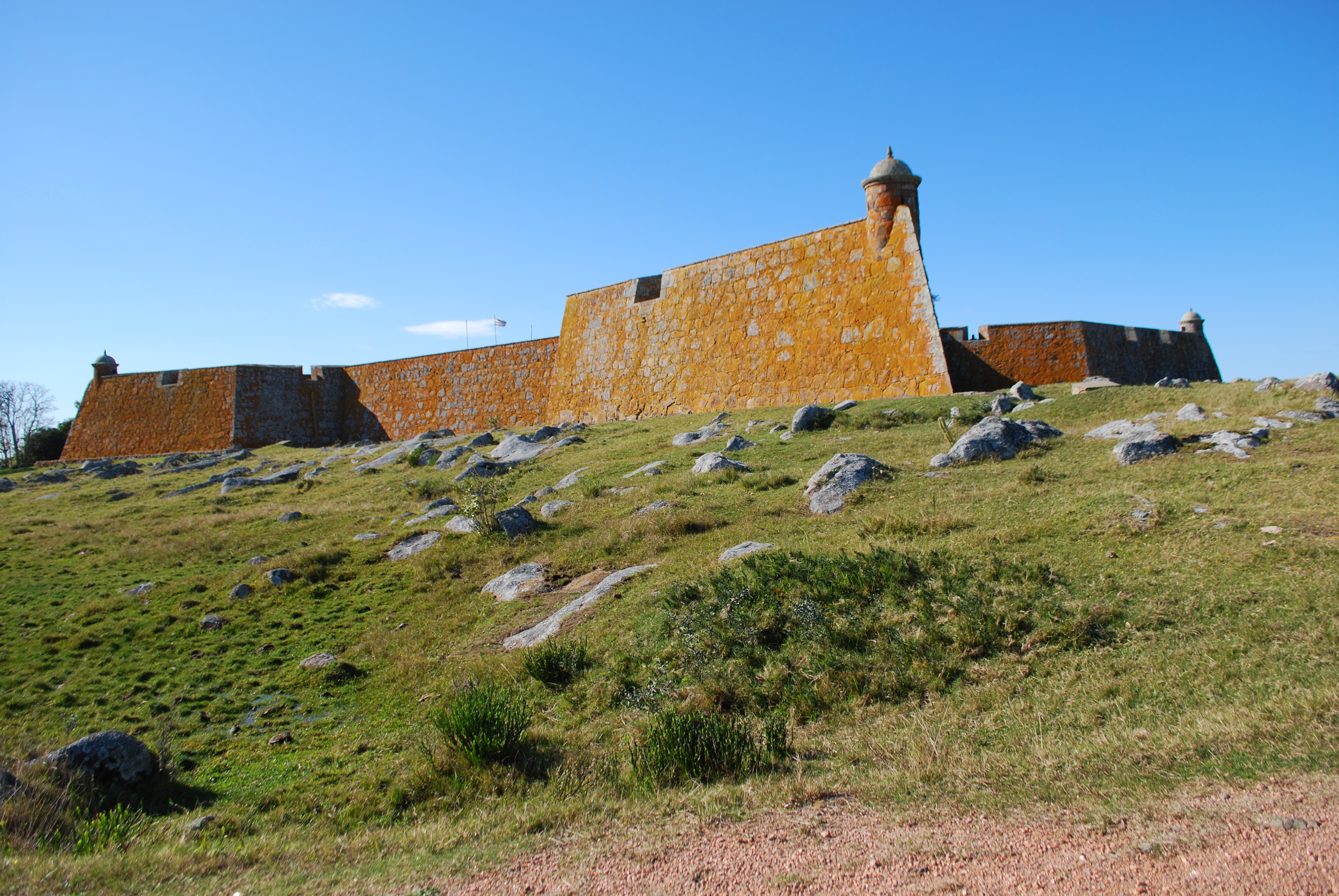
Fuerte San Miguel

Fuerte de San Miguel is a military fortification in the small town of Dieciocho de Julio in the Rocha Department of eastern Uruguay. It was erected in 1737 by the Portuguese, having abandoned the attempt at building a fort in Maldonado. It was constructed of large, heavy stones to create the tall towers (four bastions), thick walls and sturdy ramparts to withstand the onslaught of wars fought against the Spanish invaders which was instrumental in Uruguay evolving as an independent nation.

== Geography ==
The fort is located on Route 19, 6 kilometres (3.7 mi) south of the Laguna Merin, and 8 kilometres (5.0 mi) west of Chuy. Visible after passing Paso de Punta Segra, it is situated on top of the Sierra de San Miguel, thirty-five metres high, in an area of mostly large and extensive valleys. At the foot of the mountain runs the San Miguel River, though it is out of sight of the fortress. In the distance are mountains forming the boundary with Brazil.

== History ==
With a garrison of 100 men, the fort was used by the Portuguese as an observation post of the movements of the Spanish forces. Article XVIII of the Treaty of Madrid (1750) decided that Portugal would keep the line of Castillos Grande, and could strengthen it. Before the signing of the Treaty of El Pardo (1761), the governor and captain-general of the captaincy of Rio de Janeiro, Gomes Freire de Andrade, anticipated the consequences for the South and ordered the governor of the Colony of Rio Grande de São Pedro, Colonel Elói Madureira, to immediately dispatch troops to the Laguna region. The Portuguese strategy was to quickly build a fortified defensive line, south of Fort San Miguel, to stop the Spanish invasion in progress, after the conquest of Colonia del Sacramento in October 1762 by Governor Pedro de Cevallos of Buenos Aires.

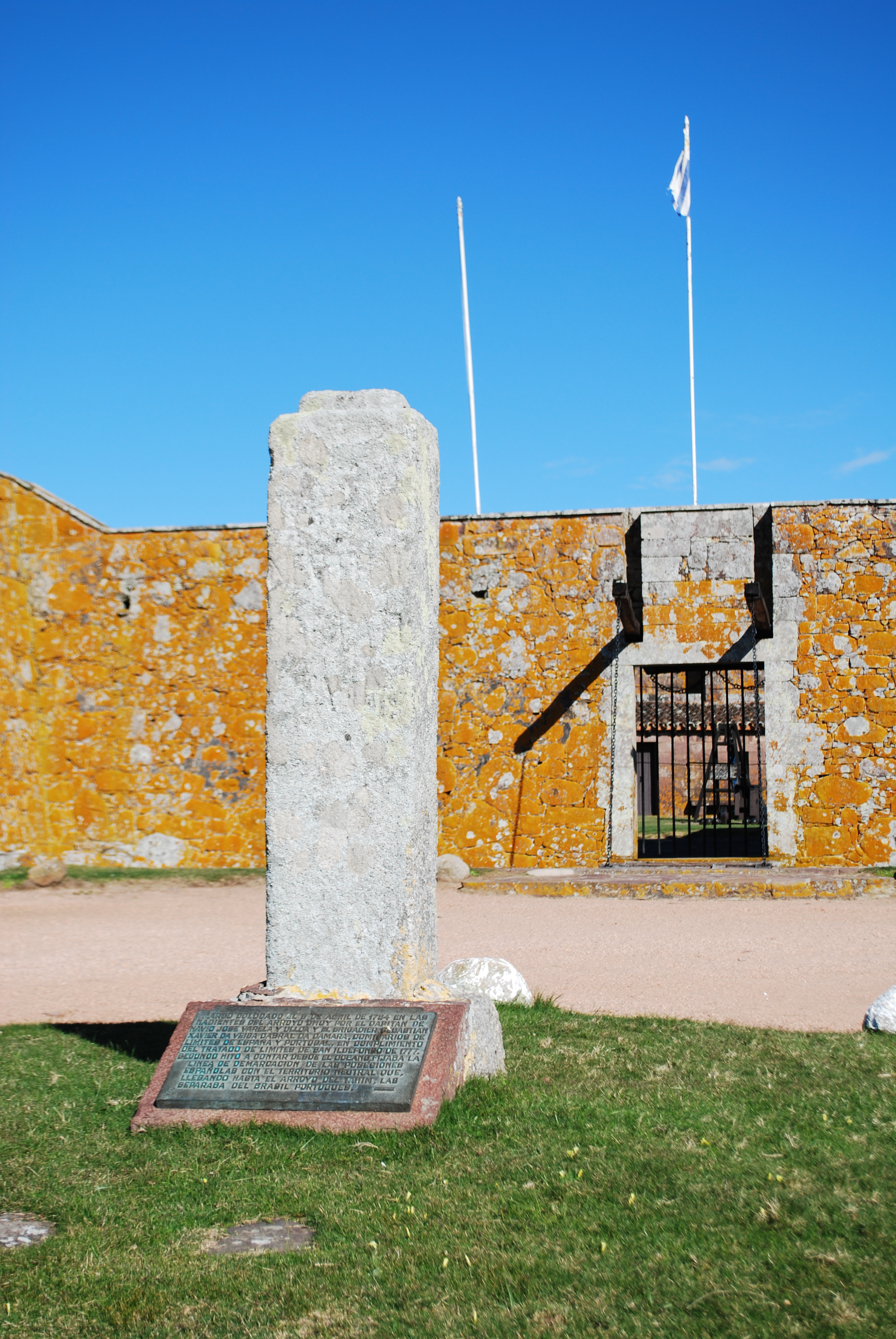
Main gate of Fuerte San Miguel

In October 1762, construction of the Fortaleza de Santa Teresa began nearby to surpass San Miguel as the main Portuguese stronghold. In April 1763, Ceballos took San Miguel and the Spanish improved it considerably into a fully functioning fort. In 1775 engineer Bernardo Lecocq made reinforcement works to the structure of the fort, with a British invasion imminent. With the Treaty of San Ildefonso (1777), the Spanish were legally confirmed as being in possession of the fort. In 1797, the fort reached its peak as a stronghold when it was strengthened further, again in anticipation of war.

After Uruguayan independence in 1828, the fort was deactivated and abandoned, becoming a ruin over time. By 1891, the fort was covered with plants, forming cracks; in one corner, a mountain palm (Cocos australis) was growing.

== Architecture ==
Initially designed as a simple defence base, building started on 17 October 1737 by the Portuguese (although the monument itself implies it was built between 1734 and 1737), attributing its construction to the military engineer Brigadier José da Silva Pais and the Portuguese military architect Manuel Gomes Pereira, later replaced by Captain Antonio Teixeira Carvalho. The fort is of smaller proportions than the neighbouring Fortaleza de Santa Teresa, being of lesser quality and irregular finishing due to the lack of granite stones available.

The initial plan had the shape of a rectangular stone polygon with two pentagonal bastions on the shorter sides at the corners, separated by curtains, and topped by watchtowers. By 1740, the base had developed, featuring a star format with four bastions pentagonal vertices in Vauban style, with internal walls and service buildings erected in irregular stonework. There was a chapel on the mound, and on one of its sides, there is a deep well. The perimeter of the walls total 300 metres (980 ft).

Grounds

Access to the fort was by a drawbridge over a flooded moat. In one of the slopes of the hill that is covered with living vegetation, there is a notable outpost; facing to the east, it includes a wall with a small window, but its appearance is natural, like a cave or animal shelter.

Reconstruction

However, over the years after the independence of Uruguay, the fort's walls started crumbling as it remained untended. Uruguayans, proud of the historical heritage of the fort of more than 300 years for the founding of Uruguay as an independent nation, decided to get the hill top fort restored in 1927. The history and structure of the fort were thus rescued by a committee composed of Gen. Alfredo R. Campos, General Alfredo Baldomir and historian Horacio Arredondo, which began operating in 1927. In 1933, the fort was rebuilt according to original plans, using the techniques of the time, restoring the premises of the Command House, the Parliament House, the chapel, kitchen and Troop Barracks. The fort was declared a National Monument of Uruguay in 1937, thereafter to promote the recovery process.

As a protected area, the diverse natural ecosystems has also been retained where native wildlife of Monkeys, birds, capybaras and guazubira are seen in the forests and marshland.

== Features ==
Under the administration of the Army, the structure is permanently open to visitors, harbouring a Museum of Military History, which highlights the collection of historical uniforms of the garrison, and the sample of the historical evolution of Army uniforms. A series of watercolors by artist Emilio Regalía are on display.

Near the fort is the inn, Hosteria Fortin de San Miguel, a 1945 building built in the Spanish colonial style with 20 rooms and a ballroom that can accommodate 150 people.

== Gallery ==
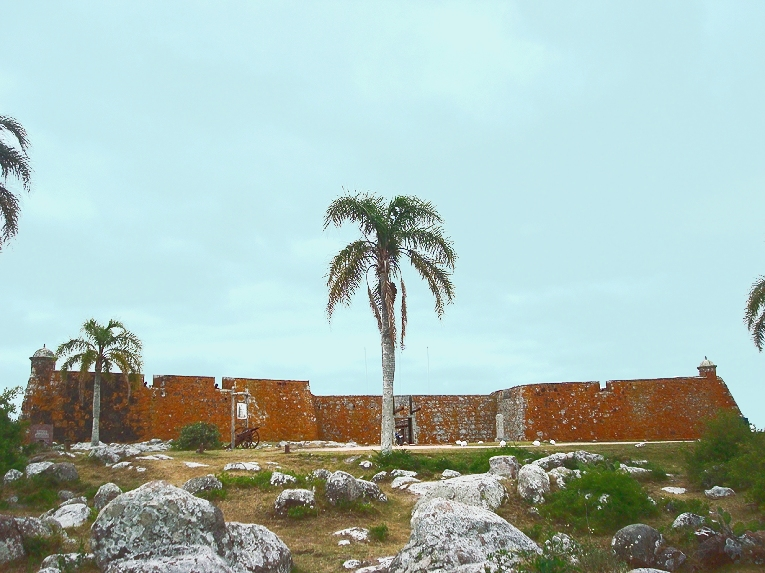

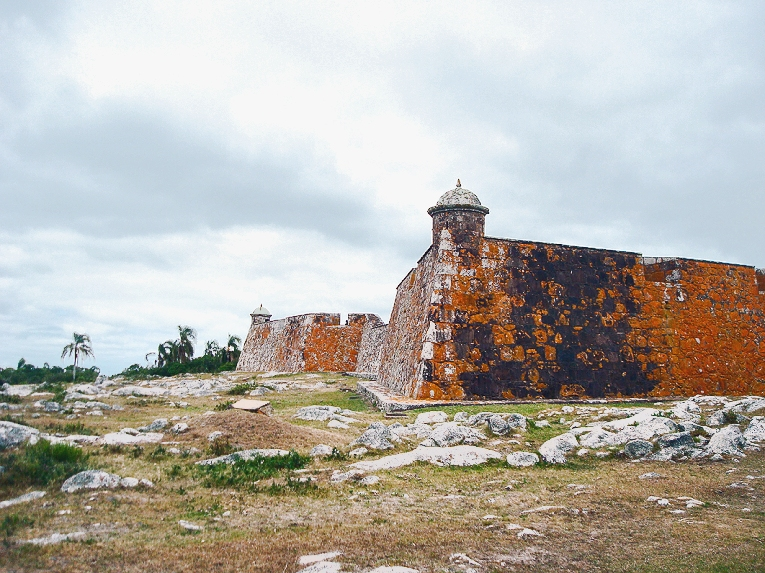

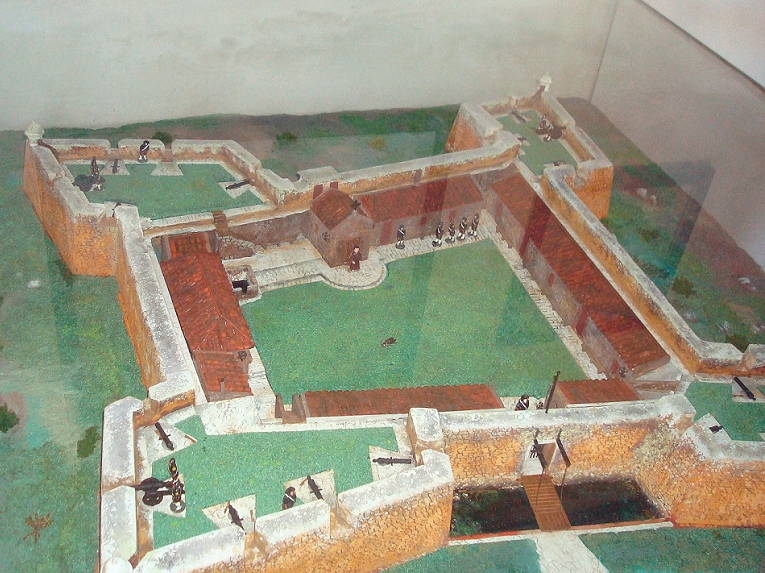

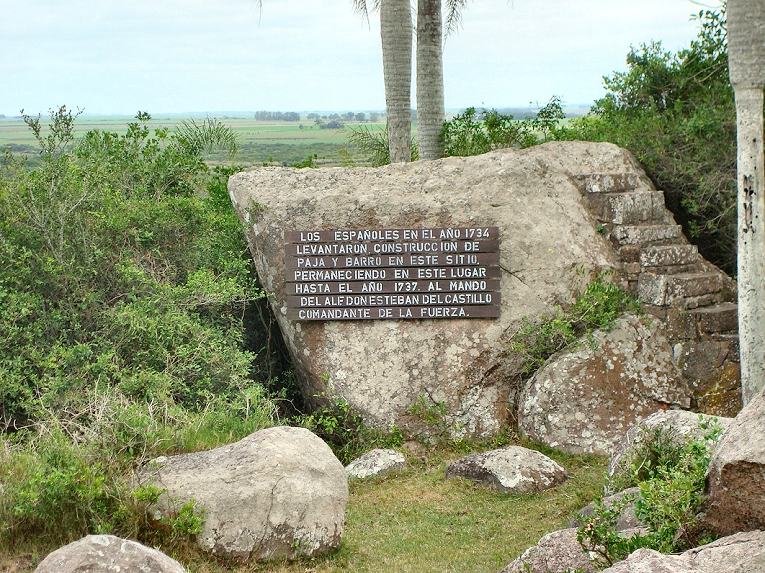

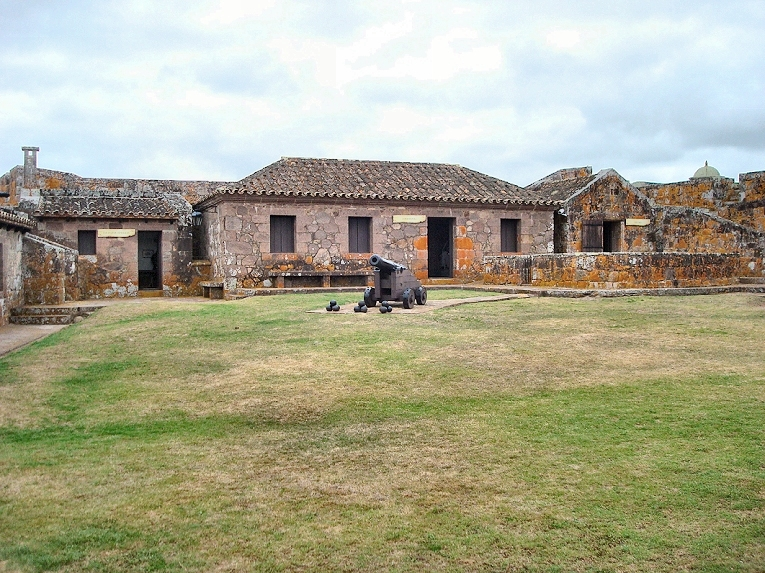
