= Barra del Chuy =

- Resort
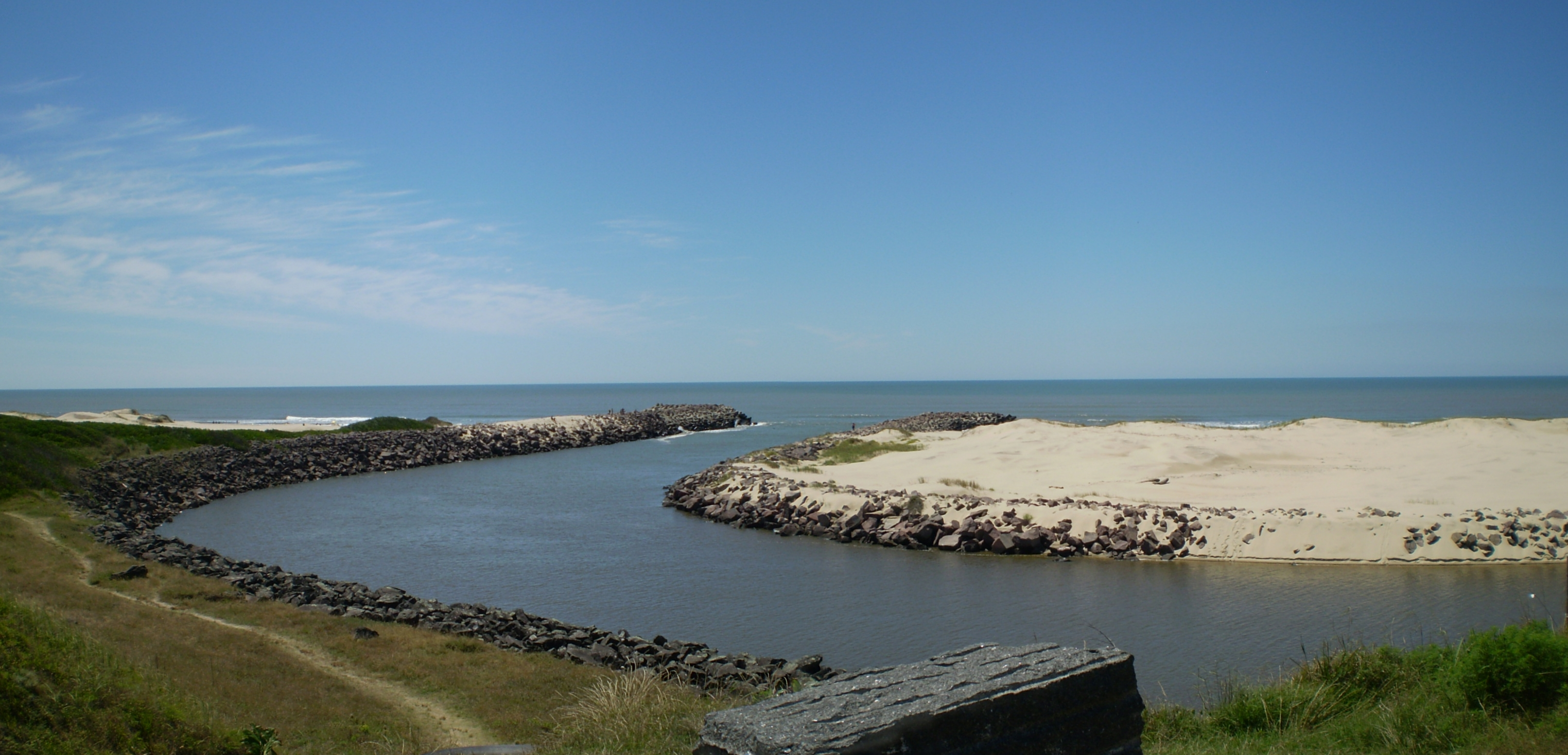
- The Mouth of Chui seen from the Brazilian side.

- Location in Uruguay
- Coordinates: 33°45′20″S 53°23′20″W
- Country: Uruguay
- Department: Rocha Department

Population (2011)
  - Total: 370
- Time zone: UTC−03:00 (UYT)
- Postal code: 27102
- Dial plan: +598 4474 (+4 digits)
- Climate: Cfa

Barra del Chuy is a resort (balneario) in the Rocha Department of southeastern Uruguay. Its name means Mouth of Chui (stream). It is the last coastal resort of Uruguay, bordering Brazil to the southeast with the stream Arroyo Chui as the natural border.

== Geography ==
The resort is located on the coast of the Atlantic Ocean, 8 kilometres (5.0 mi) in a southeastern direction into a road that spits from Route 9 about 6 kilometres (4 mi) before Chuy. It borders the resort Puimayen to the southwest.

== History ==
In the summer of 1994, the yellow cold-water clams on a 21-kilometre (13 mi) stretch of beach near the town experienced a massive die-off due to the warming waters in the South Atlantic blob, a hot spot of 340,000 km^{2} (130,000 sq mi) of ocean which has warmed 2 °C (4 °F) over the last century.

== Population ==
In 2011 Barra del Chuy had a population of 370 permanent inhabitants and 1,021 dwellings.

Year	Population	Dwellings
1963	83	225
1975	145	475
1985	275	563
1996	312	671
2004	367	869
2011	370	1,021

Source: Instituto Nacional de Estadística de Uruguay
