= Punta Palmar Lighthouse =

Lighthouse in Uruguay

Punta Palmar Lighthouse Faro de Punta Palmar
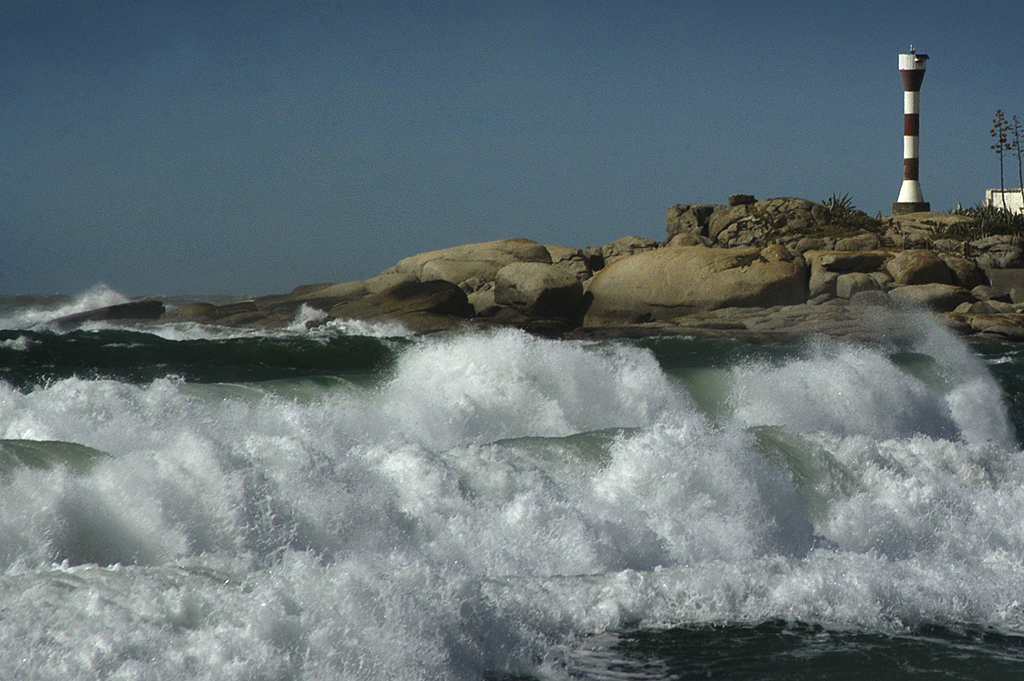
- Punta Palmar lighthouse in 2008.
- Location: Punta Palmar; Rocha Department; Uruguay
- Coordinates: 34°04′01.5″S 53°33′04.1″W

Tower
- Constructed: 1977
- Height: 12 m (39 ft)
- Operator: National Navy of Uruguay

Light
- Range: 21 nmi (39 km; 24 mi)

Punta Palmar Lighthouse (Spanish: Faro de Punta Palmar) is a lighthouse located in the headland of Punta Palmar, Rocha Department, Uruguay. Erected in 1977, it can be sighted from the seaside resort Punta del Diablo, but it is inaccessible to visitors, since it is located in a private estate.

== See also ==
- List of lighthouses in Uruguay
