= La Esmeralda, Uruguay =

La Esmeralda
- Beach Town
- Location in Uruguay
- Coordinates: 34°9′7.3″S 53°41′56.5″W
- Country: Uruguay
- Department: Rocha Department
- Elevation: 37 m (121 ft)

Population (2011)
  - Total: 57
- Time zone: UTC -3

La Esmeralda is a beach town and seaside locality in Uruguay, Rocha Department.

== History ==
The story of the area began with afforestation of sand dunes in 1949. Then, in the 1970s, the owners of the afforested areas, seeing its potential in tourist business, divided the land in solares (undeveloped plots) intended for the construction of summer homes.

Although this is still an unspoilt resort, in recent years there has been a gradual but steady increase in tourist business development. In last years, the construction of a casino and five-star hotel is planned.

== Geography ==
The town is located on the southeast side of Route 9, about 280 kilometres (170 mi) northeast of the capital Montevideo, 154 kilometres (96 mi) northeast of the resort city of Punta del Este, and 61 kilometres (38 mi) southwest of Chuy.

La Esmeralda is situated in La Angostura, isthmus of only 3000 meters wide, between the Laguna Negra and the South Atlantic Ocean on Rocha Department Wetlands, area declared a Biosphere Reserve by UNESCO in 1976. Just a few kilometres from the seaside locality are important tourist spots like La Pedrera, Valizas, Cabo Polonio, Punta del Diablo, the Fortaleza de Santa Teresa, La Coronilla, the Fuerte de San Miguel and the city of Chuy.

The topography is slightly undulating, allowing an excellent view of the ocean. It is densely forested with pines, eucalyptus and acacia, which enabled dune fixation.

== Climate ==
La Esmeralda is in the Southern Hemisphere's temperate zone and has four seasons. Temperatures average 21 to 27 °C (70 to 81 °F) in summer and 10 and 16 °C (50 and 61 °F) in winter.

== Population ==
In 2011 La Esmeralda had a population of 57 permanent inhabitants and 240 dwellings, a figure that has been increasing year by year. No census results have been given for previous years. During the summer season the number or residents is increased significantly due to tourism.

Year	Population	Dwellings
2011	57	240

Source: Instituto Nacional de Estadística de Uruguay

In the town are a police station, a fire department, accommodations for visitors, a restaurant and several shops.
