= Route 19 (Uruguay) =

Road in Uruguay

Route 19
- Ruta 19
- Coronel Lorenzo Latorre / General Basilio Muñoz / Horacio Arredondo

Route information
- Maintained by Ministry of Transport & Public Works

Location
- Country: Uruguay

Highway system
- National Routes of Uruguay

Route 19 is a national route of Uruguay. It stretches through the Durazno, Treinta y Tres and Rocha Departments. Divided into three sections, it takes the names of Lorenzo Latorre (president of Uruguay, 1876–1880), Basilio Muñoz (politician and military officer) and Horacio Arredondo (historian).

The most noteworthy populated places located along this route are: Villa del Carmen, Cerro Chato, Valentines, Villa Sara, San Luis al Medio, Dieciocho de Julio and Chuy.
