= Puimayen =

- Resort
- Location in Uruguay
- Coordinates: 33°46′0″S 53°24′0″W
- Country: Uruguay
- Department: Rocha Department

Population (2011)
  - Total: 505
- Time zone: UTC -3
- Postal code: 27102
- Dial plan: +598 4474 (+4 digits)
- Climate: Cfa

Puimayen is a resort on the Atlantic Coast in the Rocha Department of southeastern Uruguay near the Brazilian border.

== Geography ==
The resort is located 7 kilometres (4.3 mi) in a southeastern direction into a road that spits from Route 9 about 6 kilometres (3.7 mi) before Chuy. It borders the resort Barra del Chuy to the northeast.

== Population ==
In 2011 Puimayen had a population of 505 permanent inhabitants and 1,374 dwellings.

Year	Population	Dwellings
1975	78	277
1985	192	488
1996	386	749
2004	503	1,175
2011	505	1,374

Source: Instituto Nacional de Estadística de Uruguay
