= Lola Chomnalez Case =

2014 Uruguayan murder

- Court: Court First Shift of Rocha
- Full case name: Lola Chomnalez Case
- Decided: (2014-2022)

Court membership
- Judges sitting: Silvia Urioste, Sahiana Sena, Rossana Ortega, Juan Manuel Giménez

Keywords
- homicide, asphyxia

The Lola Chomnalez Case (Spanish: Caso Lola Chomnalez) was a Uruguayan investigation and judicial process into the murder of an Argentine teenager that occurred on 28 December 2014 off the coast of Uruguay.

After eight years, a man residing in Chuy, was prosecuted on 19 May 2022 with prison for "very especially aggravated homicide" as the author of the murder.

== Background ==
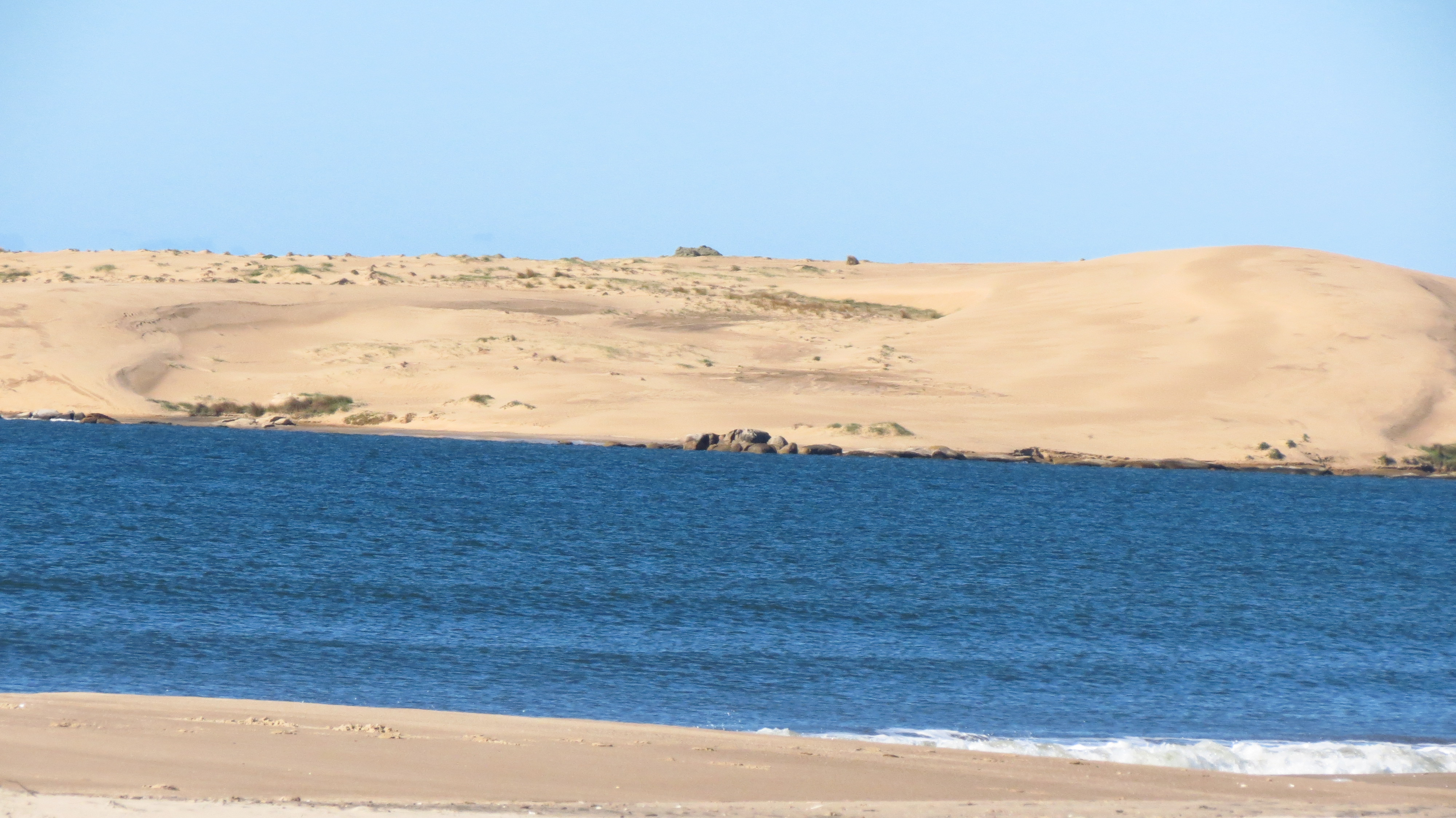
Dunes in Valizas in 2015.

Lola Luna Chomnalez was born on 4 November 1999 in Buenos Aires, daughter of Adriana Belmonte and Diego Chomnalez. Granddaughter of chef and writer Beatriz Chomnalez, she attended Secondary School No. 9 in Belgrano. She arrived in Uruguay on December 26, 2014 to vacation with her godmother Claudia Fernández, her husband Hernán Tuzinkevich, and also their two children. It was her first time abroad without her parents, and the following January she was going to travel to New York for her 15th birthday.

=== Last sighting ===
Two days after her arrival, on Sunday, 28 December, Chomnalez went for a walk on the beach with a backpack containing a towel, a book and money. After four hours and seeing that she did not return, Lola's godmother reported her disappearance and contacted her parents who traveled to Uruguay. After she was reported missing, the National Police began a search with sniffer dogs and helicopters, joined by the Navy with boats and a plane.

=== Discovery of the body ===
On 30 December the body was found by a local fisherman and his son in an area of dunes and bushes between Barra de Valizas and Aguas Dulces. Her backpack was found several meters from the body.
