= Cabo Santa María Lighthouse =

Lighthouse in Uruguay

Cabo Santa María Lighthouse Faro Cabo Santa María
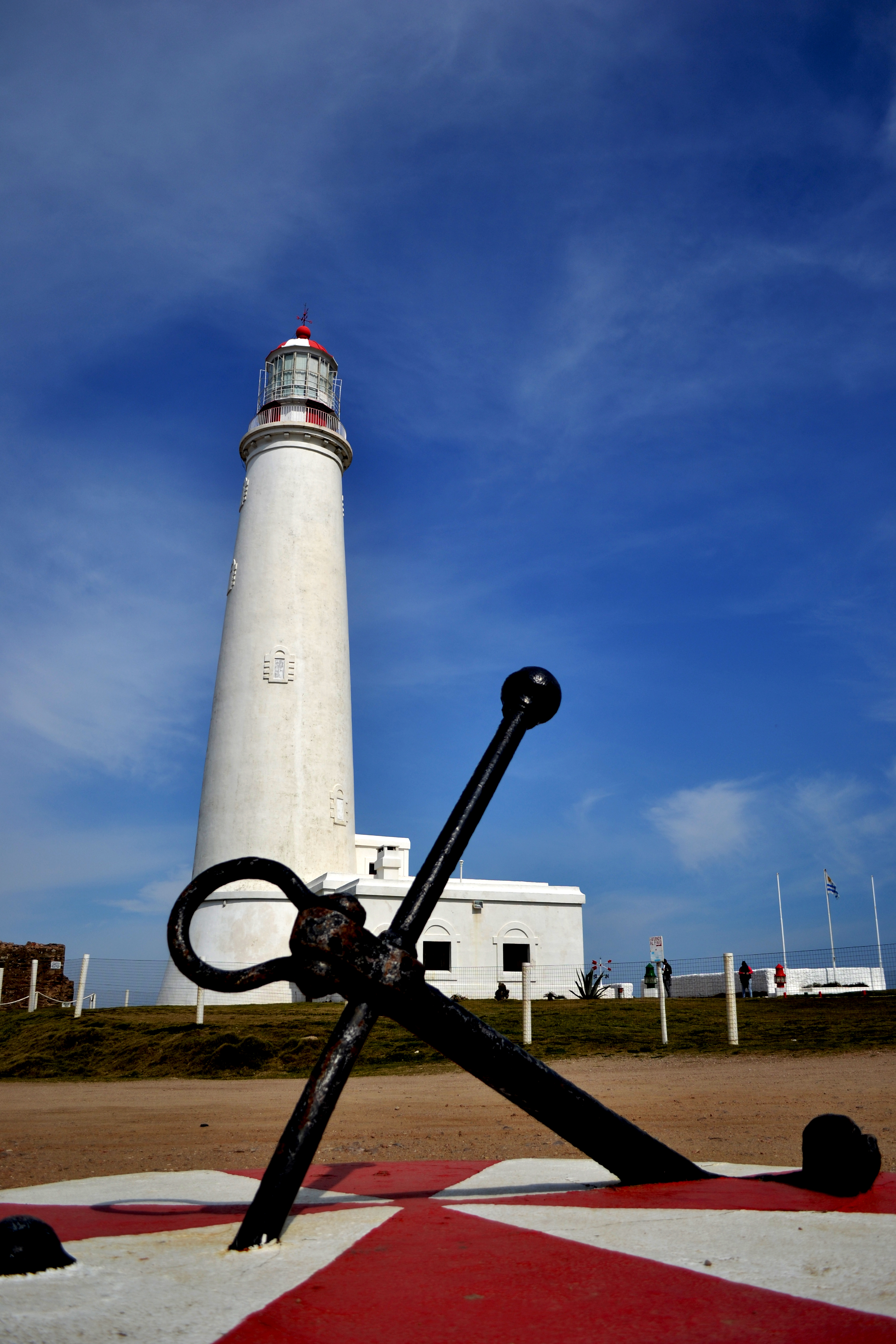
- An anchor in front of Cabo Santa María lighthouse in 2013.
- Location: Cape Santa María; La Paloma; Rocha Department; Uruguay
- Coordinates: 34°40′05.5″S 54°09′10.6″W

Tower
- Constructed: 1871
- Height: 30 metres (98 ft)
- Operator: National Navy of Uruguay
- Heritage: cultural heritage monument of Uruguay

Light
- First lit: 1 September 1874
- Focal height: 42 metres (138 ft)
- Range: 20 nmi (37 km; 23 mi)
- Characteristic: Fl W 60s

Cabo Santa María Lighthouse (Spanish: Faro del Cabo Santa María) is a lighthouse located in the headland of Cabo Santa María, Rocha Department, Uruguay, overlooking the Atlantic Ocean. Erected in 1871, it is a notable landmark of the seaside resort La Paloma.

== See also ==
- List of lighthouses in Uruguay
