= Dieciocho de Julio =

Dieciocho de Julio 18 de Julio
- Town
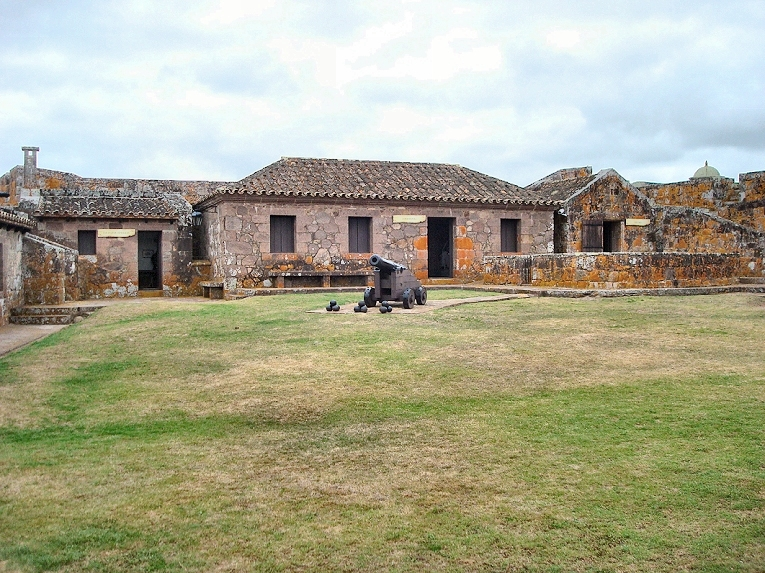
- Fuerte San Miguel

- Location in Uruguay
- Coordinates: 33°41′0″S 53°33′20″W
- Country: Uruguay
- Department: Rocha Department

Population (2011)
  - Total: 977
- Time zone: UTC -3
- Postal code: 27101
- Dial plan: +598 4474 (+4 digits)
- Climate: Cfa

Dieciocho de Julio or 18 de Julio is a small town in the Rocha Department of southeastern Uruguay.

== Geography ==
The town is located about 9 kilometres (5.6 mi) west of Chuy along Route 19. The next village to its west is San Luis al Medio.

== History ==
On 12 June 1909, the populated centre known as "San Miguel" was renamed and declared a "Pueblo" (village) by the Act of Ley N° 3.495. Its status was elevated to "Villa" (town) on 20 June 1961 by the Act of Ley Nº 12.876.

== Population ==
In 2011 18 de Julio had a population of 977.

Year	Population
1963	749
1975	743
1985	872
1996	1,139
2004	1,191
2011	977

Source: Instituto Nacional de Estadística de Uruguay

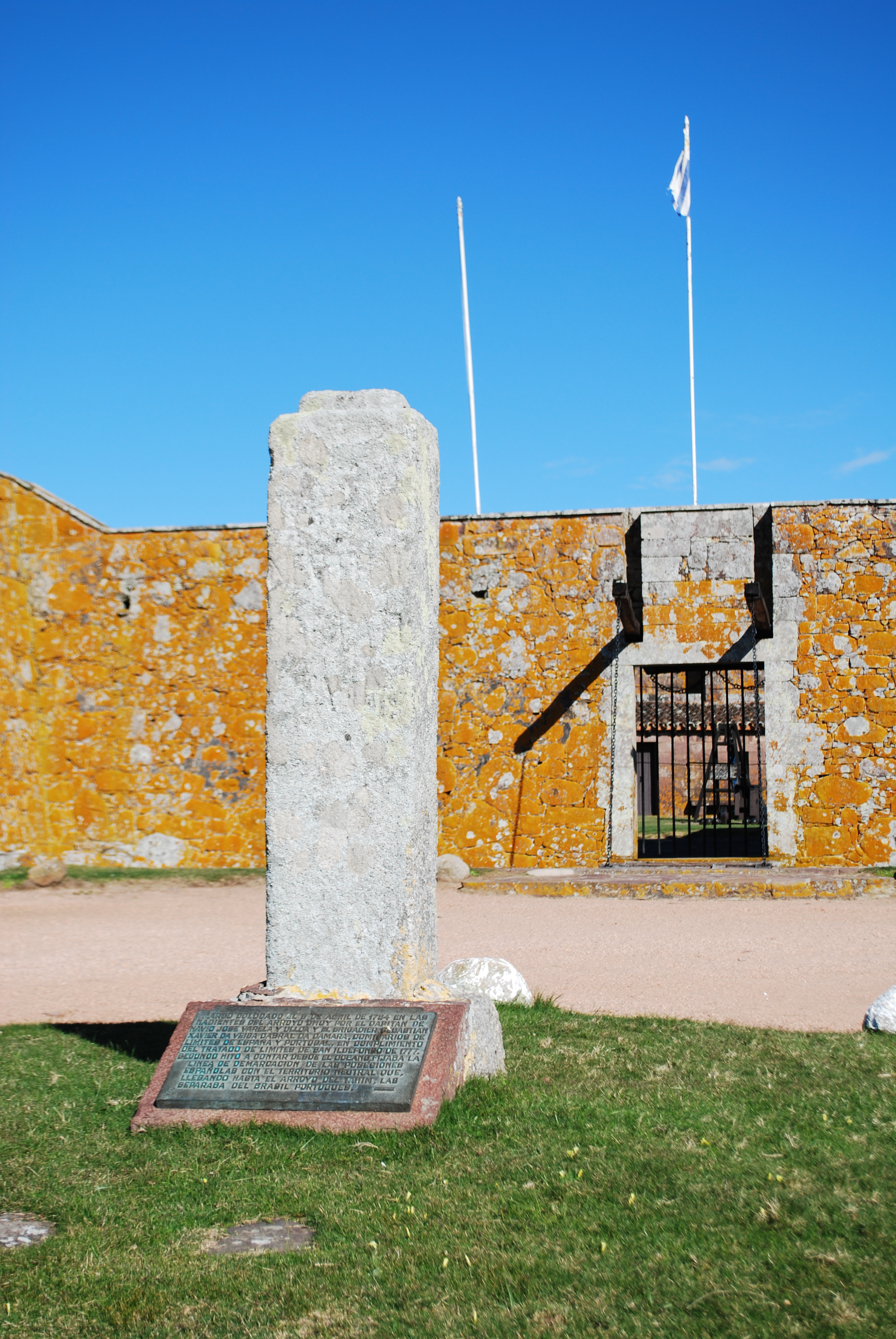
Fuerte San Miguel

== Features ==
In the town, there is the Fortin de San Miguel, a castle which has been converted to an inn and hotel.

== Fuerte San Miguel ==
At the east end of the town is a hill on which the Fuerte San Miguel is situated, a prominent fort during colonial times, built in 1737 by the Portuguese. Between the fort and the town is also the Criollo Museum, which displays outdoors replicas of the life of the gauchos, as well as indoors exhibits of the carts and carriages of the times.
