= Castillos =

- City
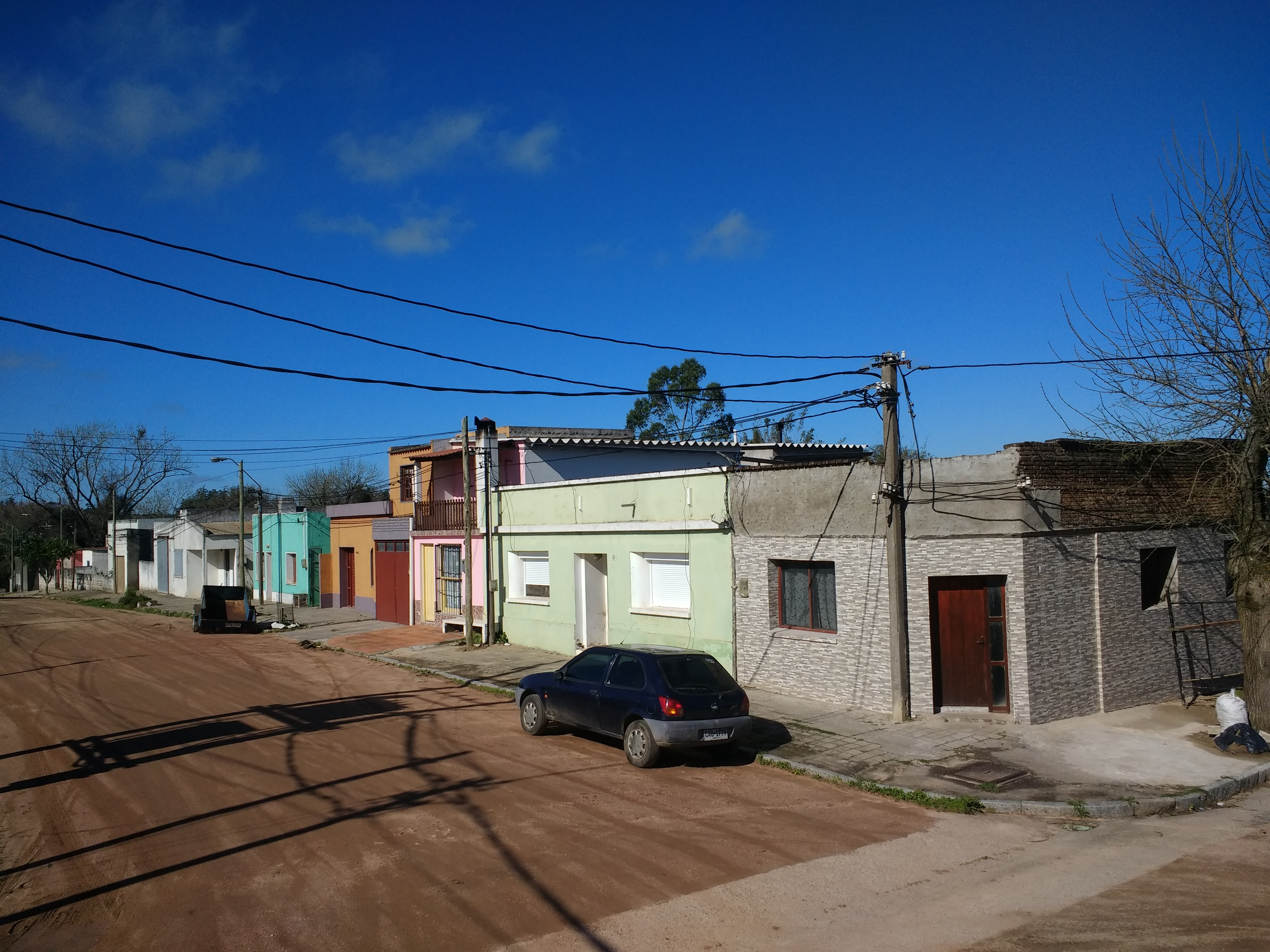

- Location in Uruguay
- Coordinates: 34°11′56″S 53°51′27″W
- Country: Uruguay
- Department: Rocha
- Founded: 1866
- Founder: Hermogenes Lopez Formoso
- Elevation: 44 m (144 ft)

Population (2011 Census)
  - Total: 7,541
- Time zone: UTC -3
- Postal code: 27200
- Dial plan: +598 4475 (+4 digits)
- Climate: Cfa

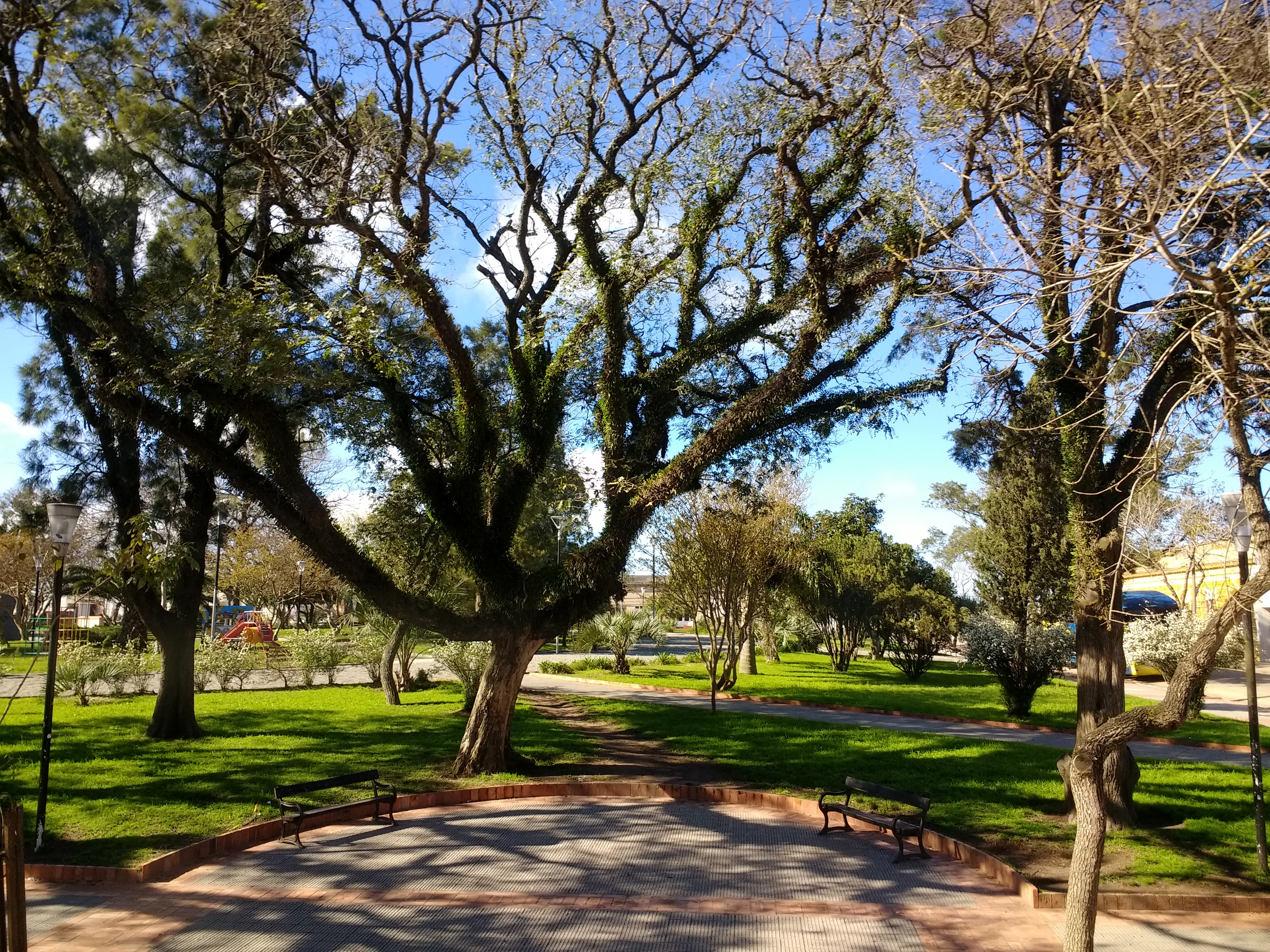
Castillos

Castillos is a small city in the Rocha Department of southeastern Uruguay.

== Geography ==
The city is located on the junction of Route 9 with Route 16, about 56 kilometres (35 mi) northeast of the city of Rocha. Other settlements in the area include Barrio Torres, about one kilometre southeast of Castillo, La Esmeralda, several kilometres to the northeast and Aguas Dulces several kilometres to the southeast along the Route 16.

Castillo is located in the eastern part of the department of Rocha. The land is low lying, located not far from the coast, with an average altitude of 44 metres. Laguna de Castillos is located to the southwest of the city, while north of it is the Cerro de los Rocha.

== History ==
It was founded on 19 April 1866 under the name "San Vicente de Castillos", derived from the chapel San Vicente Mártir de Castillos. On 3 May 1909, its status was elevated to "Villa" (town) by decree Ley N° 3.453, and on 3 November 1952, to "Ciudad" (city) by decree Ley N° 11.875.

== Population ==
In 2011 Castillos had a population of 7,541.

Year	Population
1908	3,896
1963	5,947
1975	7,260
1985	6,836
1996	7,346
2004	7,649
2011	7,541

Source: Instituto Nacional de Estadística de Uruguay

== Landmarks ==
The main plaza of the town is called Plaza Artigas and there is a cemetery in the southeast of town near the junction of Routes 9 and 16. Most of the streets are named after prominent dates in Uruguayan history and heroic figures, e.g. 25 de Mayo and General Rivera.

== Government ==
As of 2011, the local mayor is Raúl Servetto.

== Places of worship ==
- Parish Church of Mary Help of Christians and St. Vincent Martyr (Roman Catholic)

== Notable people ==
- Irineu Riet Correa, politician
- Nelson "Pindingo" Pereyra, musician
- Jesús Perdomo, historian
