= Barra de Valizas =

Barra de Valizas Valizas, Fondo de Valizas
- Resort
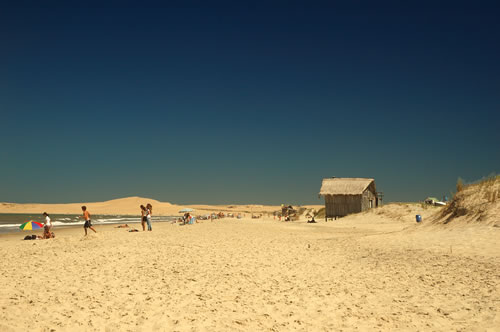
- The beach of Valizas

- Location in Uruguay
- Coordinates: 34°20′10″S 53°47′45″W
- Country: Uruguay
- Department: Rocha Department

Population (2011)
  - Total: 330
- Time zone: UTC -3
- Postal code: 27202
- Dial plan: +598 4475 (+4 digits)
- Climate: Cfb

Barra de Valizas, also known as simply Valizas, is a resort (balneario) in the Rocha Department of southeastern Uruguay.

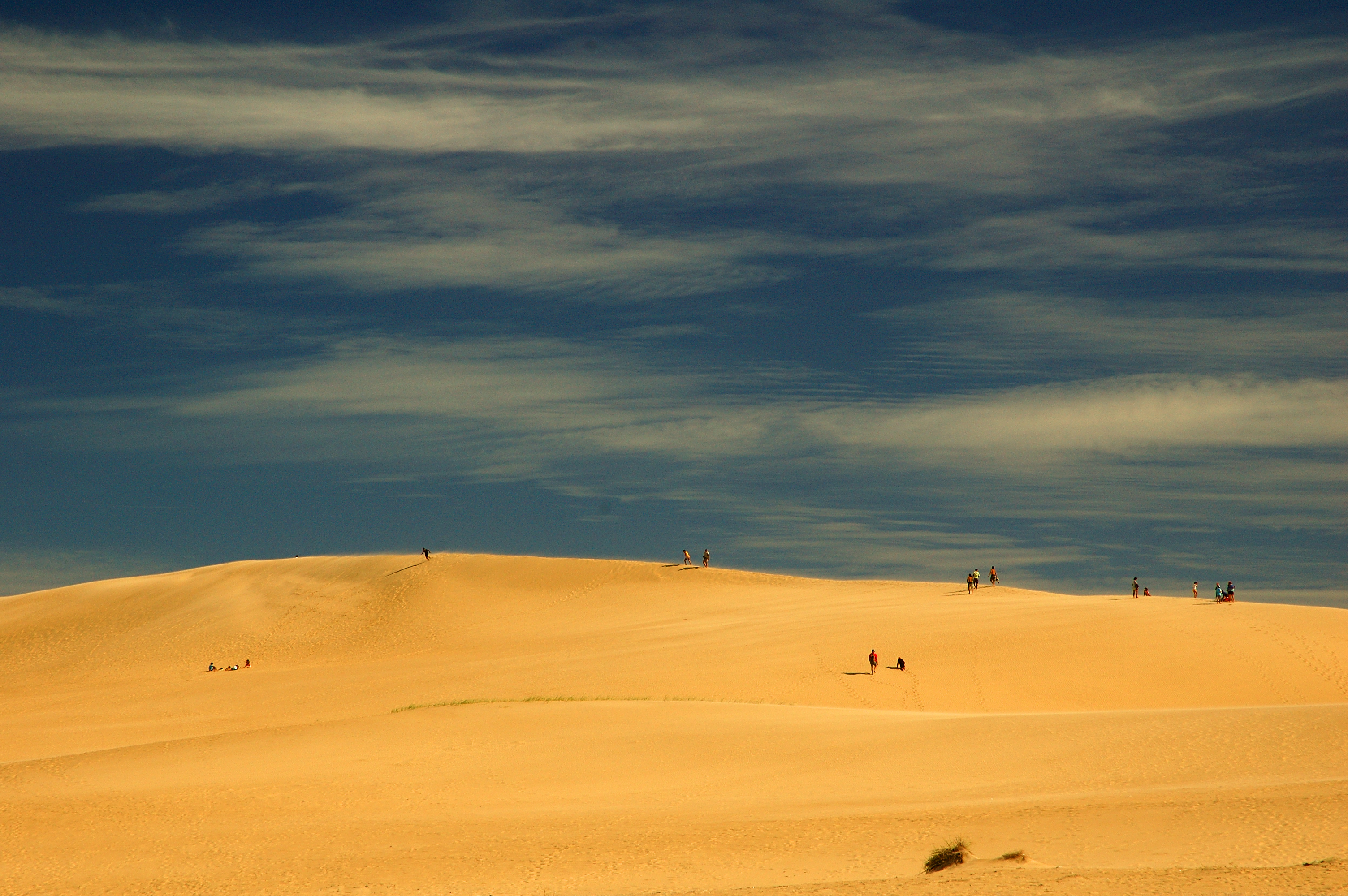
Sand dunes separating "Barra de Valizas" from "Cabo Polonio". Cabo Polonio (January 2006).

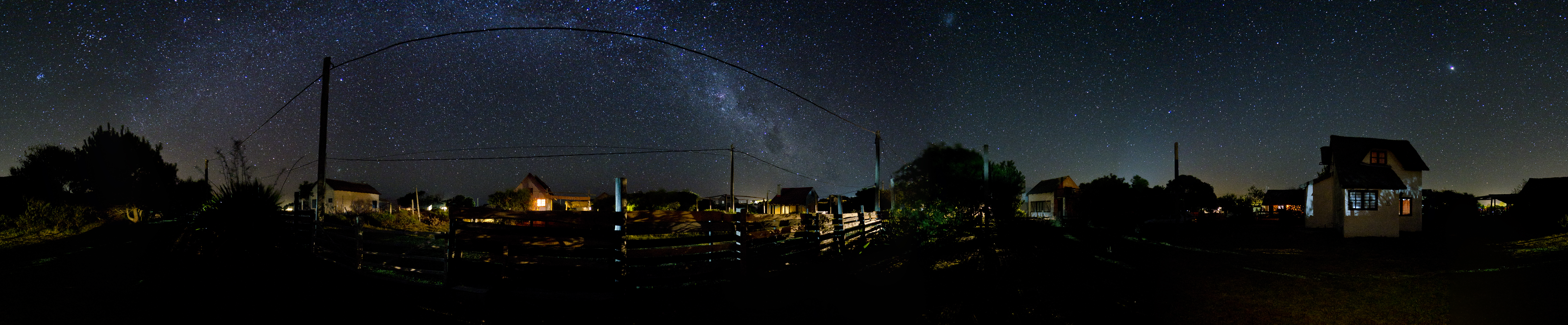
Night sky "Barra de Valizas". (December 2011)

== Geography ==
It is located on the coast of the Atlantic Ocean, 4 kilometres (2.5 mi) east of the Km. 271 of Route 10 and about 8 kilometres (5.0 mi) north of Cabo Polonio with a long stretch of huge dunes separating them.

In December 2014, Valizas was the site of the murder of Lola Chomnalez, which gained nationwide notoriety.

== Population ==
In 2011 Barra de Valizas had a population of 330 permanent inhabitants and 995 dwellings.

Year	Population	Dwellings
1963	22	19
1975	53	76
1985	113	333
1996	254	719
2004	356	876
2011	330	995

Source: Instituto Nacional de Estadística de Uruguay
