= San Gabriel Island =

Islet in Uruguay

Isla San Gabriel
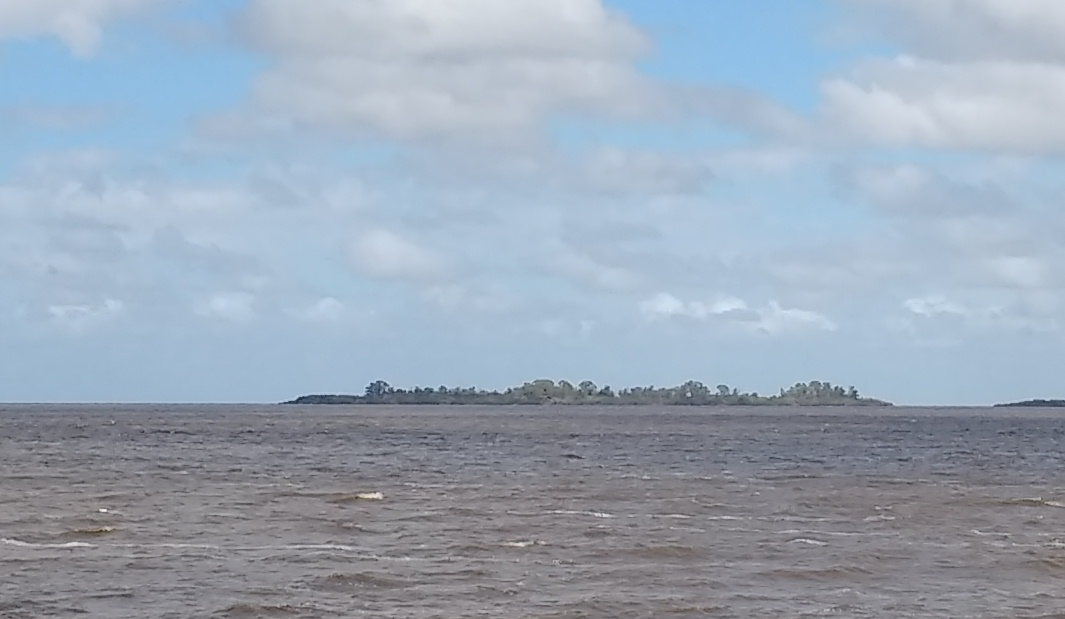
- San Gabriel Island as seen from Colonia del Sacramento.
- Interactive map of San Gabriel Island

Geography
- Location: Río de la Plata
- Coordinates: 34°28′24″S 57°53′22″W
- Area: 24 ha (59 acres)
- Length: 1.1 km (0.68 mi)
- Width: 0.45 km (0.28 mi)

Administration
- Uruguay
- Department: Colonia

San Gabriel Island is a small island belonging to Uruguay, located on the Río de la Plata near the city of Colonia del Sacramento.

It was named by explorer Sebastian Cabot in 1527.

San Gabriel and nearby Farallón have been declared National Monument.
