= Villa Sara =

- Suburb of Treinta y Tres
- Location in Uruguay
- Coordinates: 33°15′10″S 54°24′50″W
- Country: Uruguay
- Department: Treinta y Tres Department

Population (2011)
  - Total: 1,199
- Time zone: UTC -3
- Postal code: 33000
- Dial plan: +598 445 (+5 digits)

Villa Sara is a suburb of Treinta y Tres, capital city of the Treinta y Tres Department in eastern Uruguay.

== Geography ==
The suburb is located on Km. 280 of Route 8 and on its intersection with Route 19. The river Río Olimar Grande and the "Park of Río Olimar" to its northeast, separate it from the city.

== Population ==
In 2011 Villa Sara had a population of 1,199.

Year	Population
1963	152
1975	635
1985	635
1996	972
2004	1,056
2011	1,199

Source: Instituto Nacional de Estadística de Uruguay
