= La Panela Lighthouse =

Lighthouse in Uruguay

La Panela Lighthouse Faro de la Panela
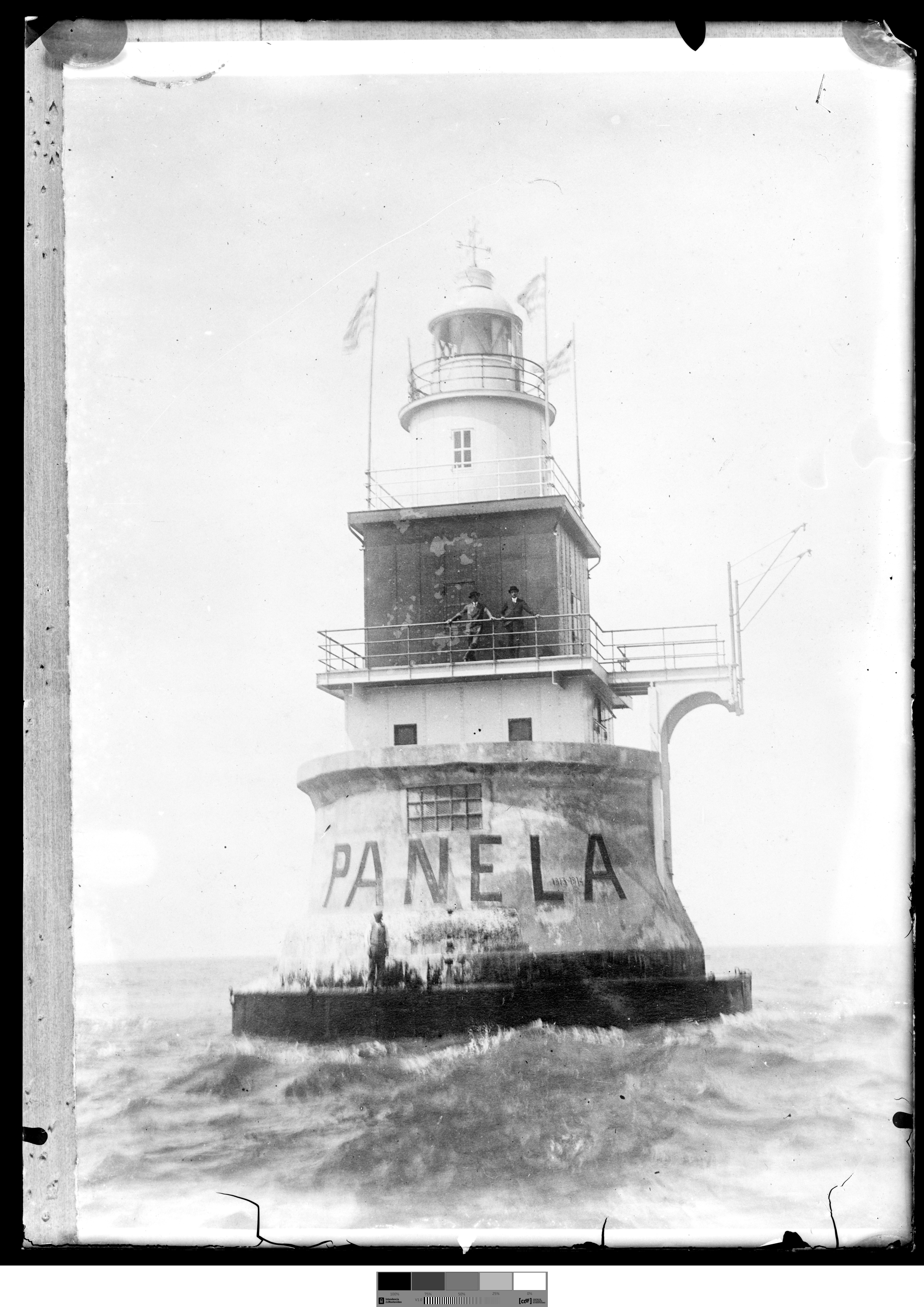
- Former La Panela lighthouse in 1921.
- Location: Río de la Plata; Montevideo; Uruguay
- Coordinates: 34°54′54.0″S 56°26′54.0″W

Tower
- Constructed: 1915
- Automated: 1951
- Height: 12 metres (39 ft)
- Operator: National Navy of Uruguay

La Panela Lighthouse (Spanish: Faro de la Panela) is a lighthouse located in the Río de la Plata, not far from the seashore of Montevideo, Uruguay. It was erected in 1915.

== See also ==
- List of lighthouses in Uruguay
