= Farallón Island Lighthouse =

Lighthouse in Uruguay

Coordinates: 34°29′05.4″S 57°55′05.7″W

Farallón Island Lighthouse Faro de la Isla Farallón
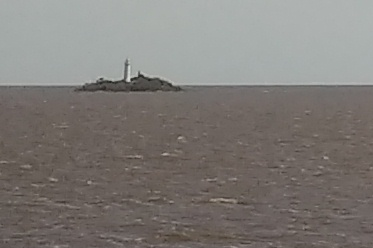
- Location: Farallón Island; Río de la Plata near Colonia del Sacramento; Colonia Department; Uruguay

Tower
- Constructed: 1876
- Automated: 1928
- Height: 24 metres (79 ft)
- Operator: National Navy of Uruguay

Farallón Island Lighthouse (Spanish: Faro de la Isla Farallón) is a lighthouse located on Farallón Island near Colonia del Sacramento, Colonia Department, Uruguay. It was erected in 1876.

== See also ==
- List of lighthouses in Uruguay
