= Punta del Este Lighthouse =

Lighthouse in Uruguay

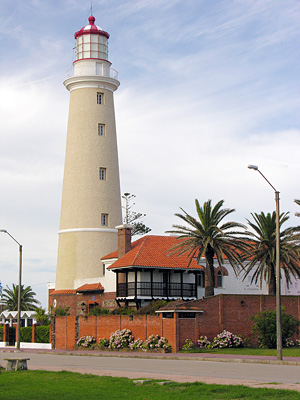
- Punta del Este lighthouse in 2006.
- Location: Punta del Este; Maldonado Department; Uruguay
- Coordinates: 34°58′07.7″S 54°57′05.8″W

Tower
- Constructed: 1860
- Height: 25 metres (82 ft)
- Operator: National Navy of Uruguay

Punta del Este Lighthouse (Spanish: Faro de Punta del Este) is a lighthouse located in the headland of Punta del Este, Maldonado Department, Uruguay. It was erected in 1860.

== See also ==
- List of lighthouses in Uruguay
