= Battle of Cardal =

Coordinates: 34°53′1″S 56°10′55″W

- Part of the British invasions of the Río de la Plata
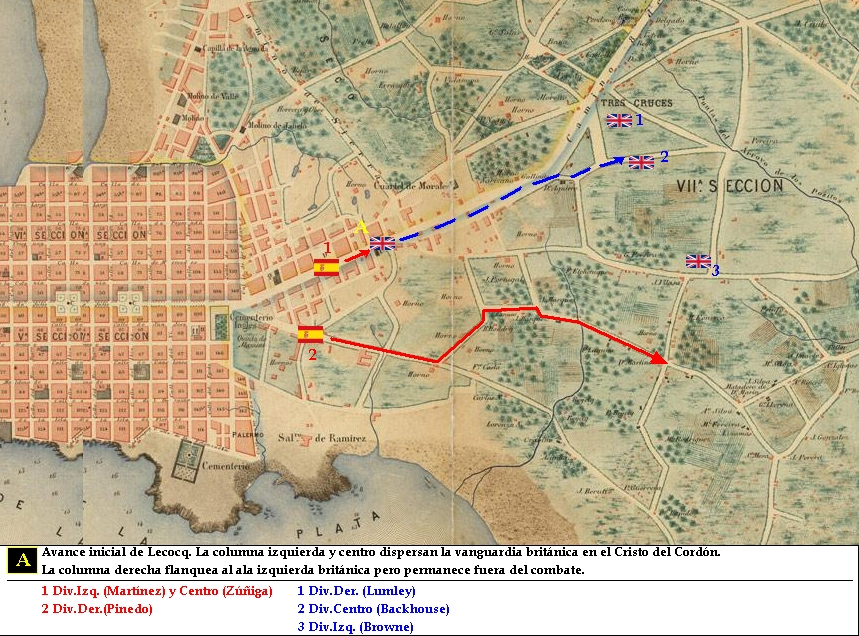
- Map of the battle
Date	20 January 1807
Location	Cardal, Uruguay
Result	British victory

Belligerents
Spain	United Kingdom

Commanders and leaders
Bernardo Lecocq	(United Kingdom) Sir Samuel Auchmuty

Strength
2,362 soldiers	5,000 soldiers

Casualties and losses
200 dead, 400 wounded and 200 prisoners	20 killed 129 wounded

The Battle of Cardal (also known as Battle of Cordón), on 20 January 1807, was the main conflict between the Spanish defense forces of Montevideo, Uruguay, and British troops during the siege of Montevideo during the second British invasion of the River Plate. The British won an easy victory over the outnumbered opposing forces, which led to the fall of the city,
