= Valentines iron formation =

Valentines iron formation is a banded iron formation found in Uruguay. It is composed of itabirite (or valentines) and gneiss.

Containing a combination of minerals such as quartz, magnetite and pyroxene, it was named after the small town of Valentines by Prof. J. Bossi.
