= Valentines, Uruguay =

Valentines
- Town
- Location in Uruguay
- Coordinates: 33°15′30″S 55°6′12″W
- Country: Uruguay
- Departments: Florida Department; Treinta y Tres Department

Population (2011)
  - Total: 178
- Time zone: UTC -3
- Postal code: 30203
- Dial plan: +598 4460 (+4 digits)
- 2 ISO codes: UY-FD, UY-TT

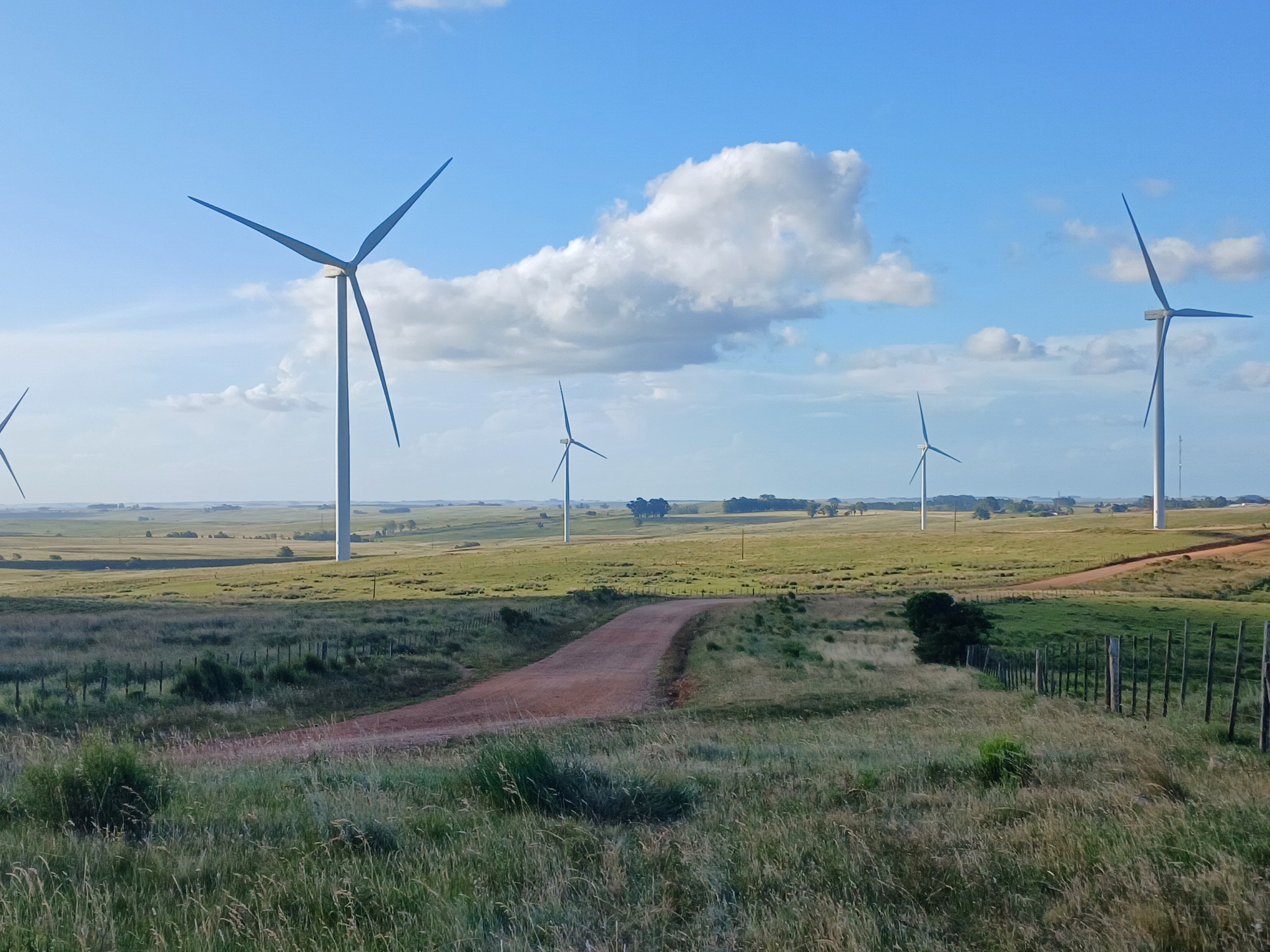
Valentines Wind Park

Valentines is a town of central Uruguay, divided in two parts belonging to Florida Department and Treinta y Tres Department respectively.

== Overview ==
Valentines is located on the Cuchilla Grande, 3 km from Route 7 (km 234) and near the crossing with Route 19.

Historically this place has been known for the presence of iron ore in the form of valentinesite.

In 2016, a 70 megawatt wind farm was opened near the town.
