= Bernardo Lecocq =

Spanish military engineer

Bernardo Lecocq (10 Feb 1734 – 7 Dec 1820) was a Spanish military engineer.

He was born in La Coruña to a Flemish father and an Irish mother. He went to the Viceroyalty of the Río de la Plata in 1770 settling in the Banda Oriental del Uruguay in 1773. He was married to María del Pilar de Pérez Valdéz, a native of Buenos Aires and in 1795 his son Manuel Francisco Bernardo Lecocq was born, who became a politician and a notable Uruguayan businessman. In 1799 he manumitted Maria Basilia Malabesone and her children who previously he had held in slavery.

Bernardo Lecocq played an important role in the operations against the British invasion of Montevideo, including the Battle of Cardal, on 20 January 1807.

He died in Montevideo in 1820.

== Career ==
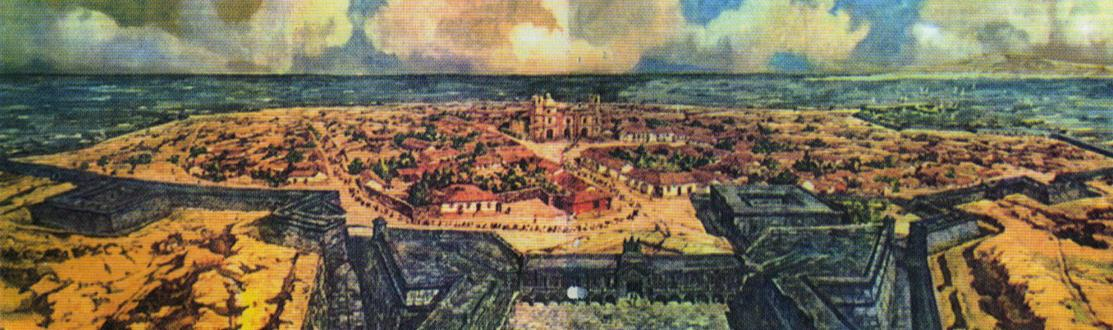
Fortifications of Montevideo

He joined the infantry in 1753. In 1776 he was responsible for building the fortifications of Montevideo, and the forts of San Miguel (1772) and Santa Tecla (1774). He was promoted to colonel in 1792 and Brigadier in 1802. He led the Spanish troops at the Battle of Cardal, on 20 January 1807.
