= La Aguada y Costa Azul =

- Village
- Location in Uruguay
- Coordinates: 34°38′0″S 54°9′0″W
- Country: Uruguay
- Department: Rocha Department

Population (2011)
  - Total: 1,090
- Time zone: UTC -3
- Postal code: 27002
- Dial plan: +598 4479 (+4 digits)
- Climate: Cfb

La Aguada y Costa Azul is a village in the Rocha Department of southeastern Uruguay.

== Geography ==
The village is located on the Atlantic coast and shares borders with La Paloma to the south (the border being the railroad track Rocha - La Paloma) and Arachania to the north.

== History ==
Its status was elevated to "Pueblo" (village) on 21 December, 1995 by the Act of Ley Nº 12.253.

== Population ==
In 2011 La Aguada y Costa Azul had a population of 1,090.

Year	Population
1963	210
1975	454
1985	967
1996	1,125
2004	1,103
2011	1,090

Source: Instituto Nacional de Estadística de Uruguay
