= Farallón Island, Uruguay =

Islet in Uruguay

Farallón Island
Isla Farallón
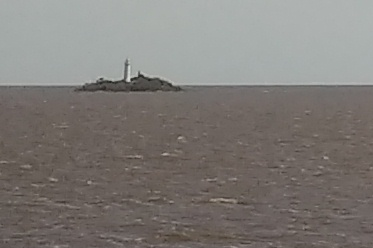
- Farallón Island as seen from Colonia del Sacramento.
- Interactive map of Farallón Island

Geography
- Location: Río de la Plata
- Coordinates: 34°29′03″S 57°55′06″W
- Area: 1.5 ha (3.7 acres)
- Length: 185 m (607 ft)
- Width: 99 m (325 ft)

Administration
- Uruguay
- Department: Colonia

Farallón Island is an islet belonging to Uruguay, located on the Río de la Plata near the city of Colonia del Sacramento. It is notable for its lighthouse.

Farallón and nearby San Gabriel Island have been declared a National Monument.
