= San Luis al Medio =

- Village
- Location in Uruguay
- Coordinates: 33°36′15″S 53°43′5″W
- Country: Uruguay
- Department: Rocha Department

Population (2011)
  - Total: 598
- Time zone: UTC -3
- Postal code: 27301
- Dial plan: +598 4474 (+4 digits)
- Climate: Cfa

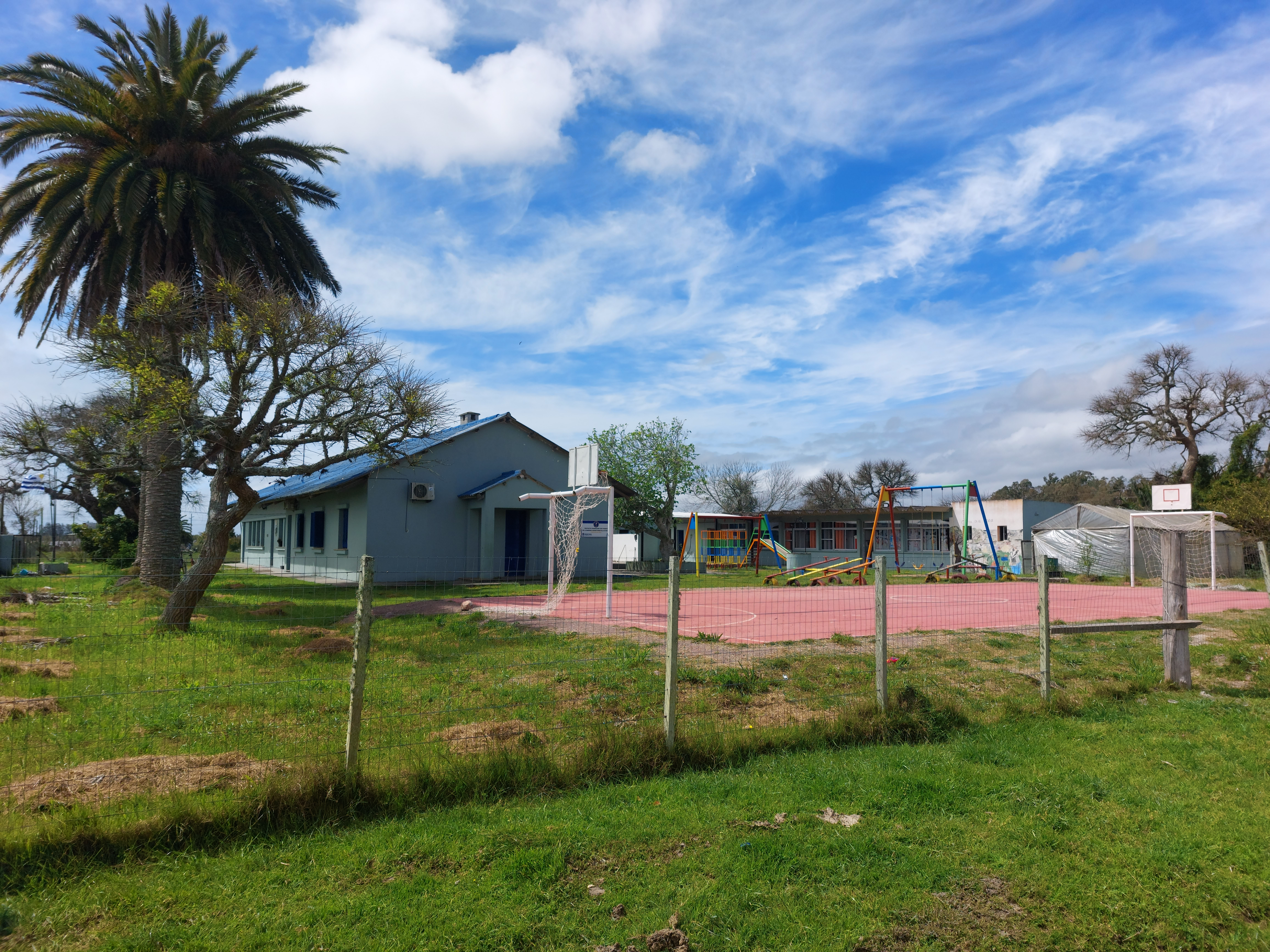
School N° 17 Agustín Ferreiro

San Luis al Medio is a village in the Rocha Department of southeastern Uruguay.

== Geography ==
The village is located on Route 19, about 29 kilometres (18 mi) west-northwest of Chuy. The river Río San Luis flows north and west of the town.

== History ==
On 3 November 1952, its status was elevated to "Pueblo" (village) by the Act of Ley Nº 11.876.

== Population ==
In 2011 San Luis al Medio had a population of 598.

Year	Population
1963	387
1975	401
1985	505
1996	578
2004	702
2011	598

Source: Instituto Nacional de Estadística de Uruguay

== Notable people ==
- Alem García, politician, President of the Chamber of Deputies in 1992.
