= Punta del Diablo =

- Village, resort
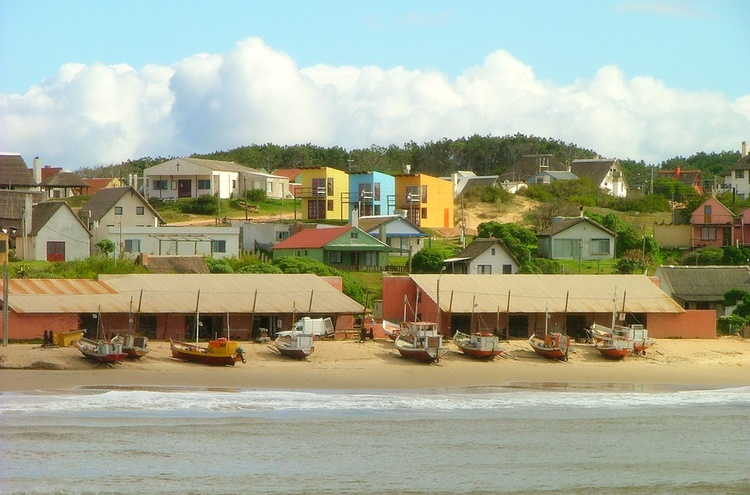

- Location in Uruguay
- Coordinates: 34°2′45″S 53°32′20″W
- Country: Uruguay
- Department: Rocha Department

Population (2011)
  - Total: 823
- Time zone: UTC -3
- Postal code: 27204
- Area code: +598 4477
- Climate: Cfa

Punta del Diablo is a village and seaside locality in Uruguay, Rocha Department, 298 kilometres (185 mi) east from the capital Montevideo. According to the 2011 census, its permanent population consisted of 823 inhabitants, mostly fishermen and artisans, while during high tourism season, the population swells to approximately 25,000, mostly with Argentinians, Brazilians and Europeans on holiday. As with the country it is located in, the primary language spoken in Punta del Diablo is Spanish. In 2008 it was named by the magazine "Lonely Planet" as one of the top 20 places to visit and invest.

== Population ==
In 2011 Punta del Diablo had a population of 823.

Year	Population
1985	199
1996	318
2004	389
2011	823

Source: Instituto Nacional de Estadística de Uruguay

== Geography ==
The village of Punta Del Diablo is situated 298 kilometres (185 mi) from Montevideo, the capital of Uruguay, 172 kilometres (107 mi) from the upscale seaside resort town of Punta del Este, and 43 km from Chuy (which borders the Brazil city of Chuí).

Punta Del Diablo is perched on a gentle rise overlooking the ocean and centered around a square of brightly colored buildings, including houses, shops, restaurants, bars, shops and grocery stores that line sandy lanes.

Due to strict building codes, there are no high rises or sprawling luxury resorts or high rises. Instead there are small hotels, a boutique hostel, cabanas and vacation houses.

The white sands of the beach below are separated by the main rocky point, "Punta Del Diablo," which extends more than 600 feet, and two other rocky points, together forming "The Trident."

=== Climate ===
Punta del Diablo is in the Southern Hemisphere's temperate zone and has four seasons. Temperatures average 21 to 27 °C (70 to 81 °F) in summer and 10 and 16 °C (50 and 61 °F) in winter.

== Tourism ==
The high season for tourism runs from December through February, as well as through Easter week. During high season, the population of the small fishing and artisan village of approximately 400 people, grows to approximately 25,000.

Tourists rent homes and cabanas or stay in hostels and small hotels. Most of the hotels and hostels are open only during the high season; however, some are open year-round to accommodate the increasing number of visitors to the seaside village. In response several restaurants including fine-dining options are also open off-season.

In 2008, Lonely Planet ranked Punta del Diablo among the top 10 cities to visit. During that year, tourism was up to about 20,000 visitors during the December to February seasonal peak.

Punta del Diablo's popularity with holidaymakers has steadily increased. And the single farming family that has owned the entirety of Punta del Diablo has been steadily selling land to investors.

This tourism growth and Uruguay's positive investment climate and rule of law are attractive to foreign investors. Foreign investors are treated the same as national investors, prior authorization is not required, and they enjoy fully free remittance of capital and profits. Uruguay itself is host to about 100 American firms with investments totaling approximately $656 million; and the small village of Punta del Diablo has attracted a steady stream of American and other foreign investors.

== Places of interest ==
- Beaches - The picturesque, white sand beaches are a major attraction here and include: Los Botes, called "Fisherman’s Beach" and from which most of the boats depart; Rivero, which in the high season is lined with open bars and popular with surfers; and La Viuda, also popular with surfers and where locals and visitors are often seen in the summer gathered around beachfires playing guitars and singing songs.
- Parque Nacional Santa Teresa (Saint Teresa National Park) - This coastal National Park is about 5 km from Punta del Diablo. The 3,000 hectares is home to approximately 2 million trees, as well as flora and fauna from around the world (including rare cormorants); it is the site of one of Uruguay's major battles for its independence. The park has 60 km of hiking trails. Sand dunes may be found on the beaches. Whales can be seen along the shore during Uruguay's summer.
- Fortaleza de Santa Teresa(Fortress of Santa Teresa) - A significant historical site in Uruguay, the fortress sits on top of a hill inside Saint Teresa National Park. The Portuguese began building the hilltop fort in 1762 and worked on it until the Spanish captured it in 1793. It was built in a disputed territory between the two empires that now form one of the oldest borders in the American continent. Its location between the Atlantic Ocean and the Laguna Negra with the bañados (wetlands) in the other side of the lagoon made it a strategic point for any army coming from Brazil to achieve the ancient dream of the "natural borders of Brazil" on the River Plate. Fortaleza de Santa Teresa was also part of later battles between the two empires, as well as the Spanish and Creoles, and in civil wars after Uruguay became an independent nation. The fortress was restored in 1928 and features a museum that illustrates its history. The fortress is also depicted in the shield in the center of Rocha's municipal flag and on the department's municipal shield, becoming a symbol of this border department with Brazil.
- Laguna Negra formerly known as Laguna de los Difuntos - Boaters and birdwatchers enjoy this lake and its swamps, has an area of 182 km^{2}. (70 sq. miles), maximum depth of 5 mt. (16 feet).
- Bosque de Ombúes (Ombu Forest) - The native Ombu that populate this forest is a hardy tree that survives on very little water. Jeep and tractor tours are offered, and visitors may also view the forest on foot. The forest includes flora and fauna endemic to the region.
- Centro de Tortugas Marinas (Center for Sea Turtles) - This is located near a popular foraging site for sea turtles, the waters off the beaches of Barra del Chuy to Punta del Diablo. The Center educates visitors and runs a volunteer program.

== Activities ==
Horseback Riding. Year round, visitors can rent horse or take guided horseback riding tours on the beach or in the forest.

Dune boarding. Similar to snow boarding only done on the sand dunes. The surf shop in Punta del Diablo sells dune boards. Popular locations in Punta del Diablo for sand duning include the south end of La Viuda beach.

Surfing. The surf breaks off Punta Diablo's beaches offer relatively consistent and uncrowded surf. Best conditions are in the autumn and winter with high season running from December to February.

== Transport ==
It is about an hour's walk from one end of the town to another. There is a regular bus service that transports people from the main village road to the beach. There is taxi services, which park at the bus stop when talking into account the buses schedules.

Punta del Diablo has regular bus service to Chuy (bordering Brazil), Rocha and Montevideo. All year long there is also services to the seaside towns of La Paloma, La Piedra, and Punta del Este. During the high season of tourism, January, all bus seats are sometimes booked days in advance.

Car rentals are found in Montevideo, Rocha and Maldonado.

Going into Punta del Diablo, some of the buses go into town and others drop off passengers about 5 km from town at a square from which dirt roads fan out to various parts of the village. It is about a 3 ½ bus ride from Montevideo.
