= Rocha Department =

Department of Uruguay

Rocha
- Department
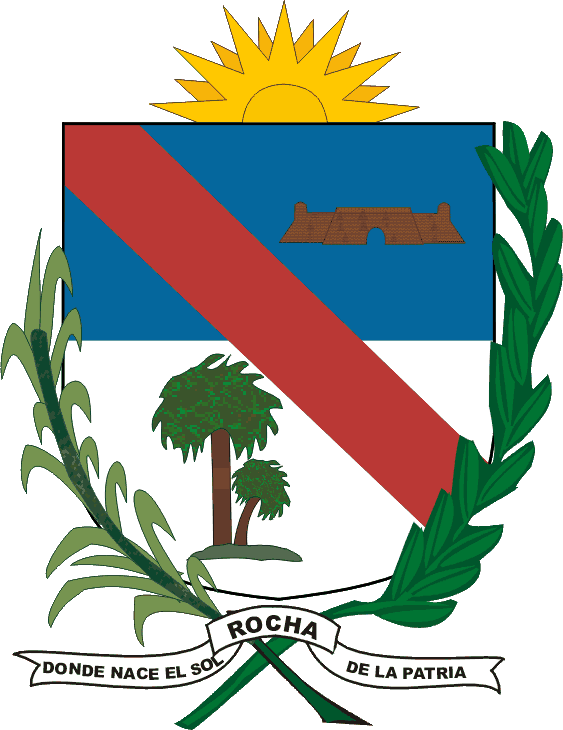
- Flag Coat of arms

- Location of Rocha Department in Uruguay
- Coordinates (Rocha): 34°29′0″S 54°21′0″W
- Country: Uruguay
- Inception: 1880
- Capital of Department: Rocha

Government
  - Intendant: Nicolás García
  - Ruling party: Partido Nacional

Area
  - Total: 10,551 km^{2} (4,074 sq mi)
- Elevation: 123 m (404 ft)

Population (2023 census)
  - Total: 80,707
  - Density: 7.6492/km^{2} (19.811/sq mi)
- Demonym: Rochense
- Time zone: UTC-3 (UYT)
- ISO 3166 code: UY-RO
- Website: www.rocha.gub.uy

Rocha (Spanish pronunciation: [ˈrotʃa]) is a department in the east of Uruguay. Its capital is the city of Rocha. It borders Maldonado Department to its west, Lavalleja Department to its northwest, Treinta y Tres Department to its north, while to its northeast Laguna Merín forms part of its border with Brazil and at the south end of the lake it also borders the southernmost end of Brazil, with the city of Chuy "shared" between both countries, the border passing through its main commercial avenue.

Rocha has natural beauties like Cabo Polonio, Valizas, Santa Teresa National Park. It is well known for its beach resorts, like Punta del Diablo or La Esmeralda, which swell with visitors during the summer holidays. Inland, the primary economy of Rocha is based on large cattle ranches.

== History ==
On 7 July 1880, the department of Rocha was formed from territory that had belonged to the department of Maldonado since the first division of the Republic in departments in 1819.

== Population and Demographics ==
Ethnic groups in Rocha (2023 est.)
Ethnic groups	Percent
White	87.4%
Black	10.9%
Indigenous	8.3%
Asian	0.7%
None/Other/Unspecified	5.8%

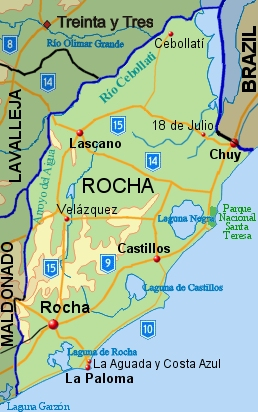
Topographic map of Rocha Department showing main populated places and roads

As of the census of 2011, Rocha Department had a population of 68,088 (33,269 male and 34,819 female) and 46,071 households.

Demographic data for Rocha Department in 2010:

- Population growth rate: -0.082%
- Birth Rate: 14.04 births/1,000 people
- Death Rate: 10.44 deaths/1,000 people
- Average age: 35.0 (34.0 male, 36.0 female)
- Life Expectancy at Birth:
  - Total population: 75.82 years
  - Male: 72.17 years
  - Female: 79.43 years
- Average per household income: 19,978 pesos/month
- Urban per capita income: 8,635 pesos/month

2010 Data Source:

=== Main Urban Centres ===
Population stated as per 2011 census.

City / Town	Population
Rocha	25,422
Chuy	9,675
Castillos	7,541
Lascano	7,645
La Paloma	3,495
Cebollatí	1,609
La Aguada y Costa Azul	1,090
Velázquez	1,022

=== Other towns and villages ===
Population stated as per 2011 census.

Town / Village	Population
18 de Julio	977
Punta del Diablo	823
San Luis al Medio	598
La Coronilla	510
Puimayen	505

=== Rural population ===
According to the 2011 census, Rocha department has an additional rural population of 4,146.

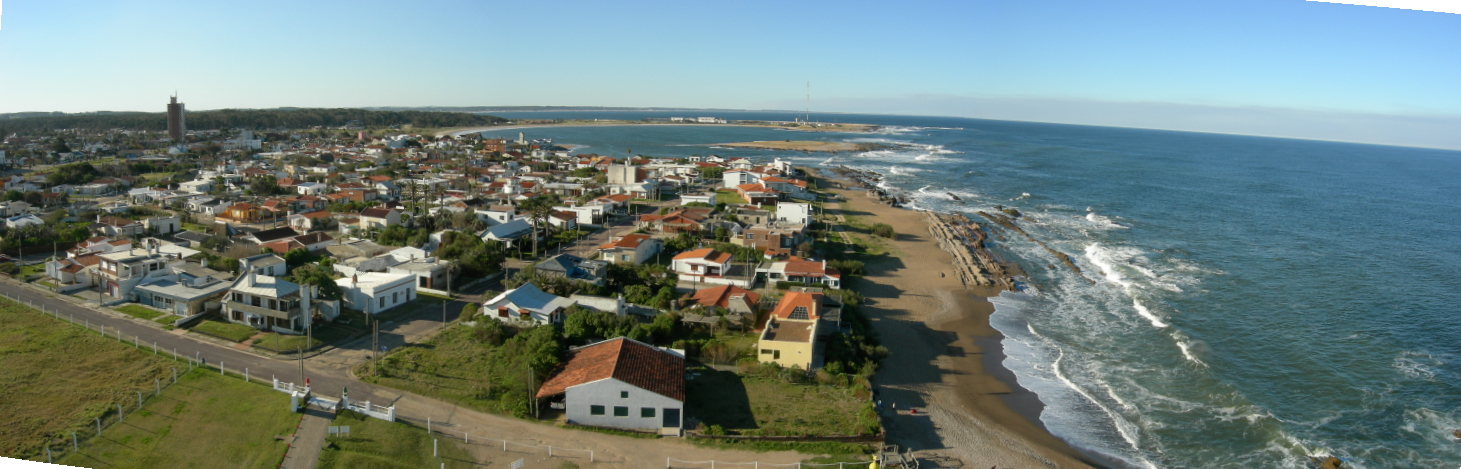
La Paloma, Rocha

== In literature ==
Rocha department features in Carlos Maria Dominguez's 2004 novel Casa de Papel (trs English, 2005, The House of Paper). The narrator visits the ruins of a house of books ergo, 'house of paper', which had been built and then destroyed by an obsessive book collector on the sand spit separating Rocha lagoon from the ocean.

== See also ==
- List of populated places in Uruguay#Rocha Department
