= Chuy =

- City
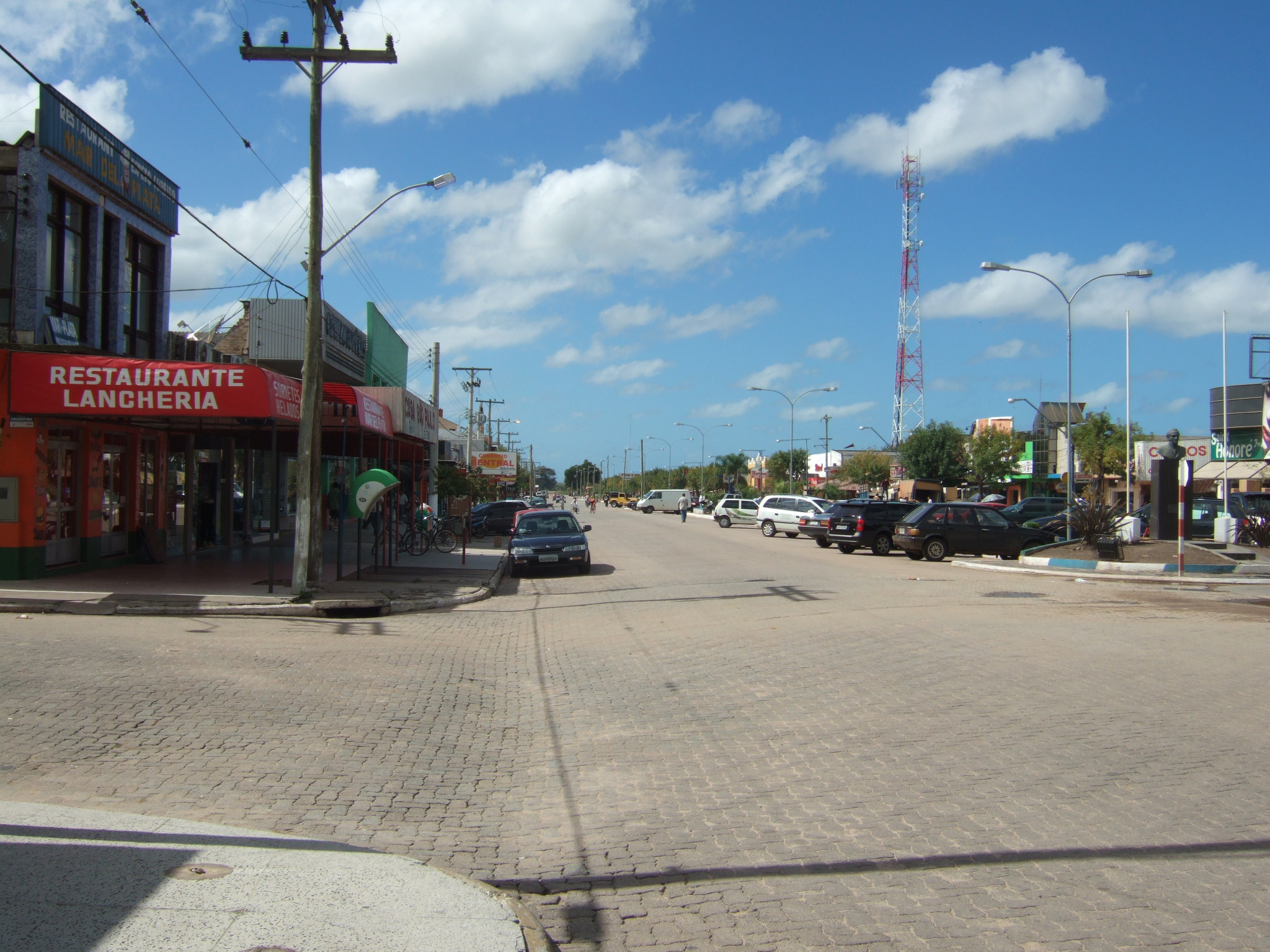

- Location in Uruguay
- Coordinates: 33°41′47″S 53°27′36″W
- Country: Uruguay
- Department: Rocha
- Elevation: 13 m (43 ft)

Population (2011 Census)
  - Total: 9,675
- Time zone: UTC −3
- Postal code: 27100
- Dial plan: +598 4474 (+4 digits)
- Climate: Cfa

Chuy (Spanish pronunciation: [ˈtʃwi]) is a city in the extreme east of Uruguay, in the Rocha Department, 340 kilometres (211 mi) northeast of Montevideo. It lies on the border with Brazil, separated from its Brazilian sister town of Chuí only by a shared avenue that serves as the border, and by the Arroyo Chuy (stream) to the east. Chuy's population was 9,675 in 2011.

== Etymology ==
The word "Chuy", according to most scholars, comes from a Tupi–Guarani language. One of such Indigenous nation had designated the small brook on whose banks the town would emerge with the same name. According to Daniel Granada, chui was also the name that Tupi–Guarani language's speakers gave to a yellow-breasted bird, native and common in the marshes of the area. According to Tancredo Blotta, chuy is a compound word which should be translated as "river of brown water".

The Brazilian historian Péricles Azambuja alludes to a rumor that the word (originally Chyu) would have been brought by former nations who migrated from the Andes. A Quechua word, achuy had the meaning of "teaching" through storytelling, thus chuy'o would be "master " or "narrator." In a different context, chuy can be seen to mean a small frog or toad in the water, a small turtle or small horse. Advocates of some of these theories base their beliefs on the fact that the stream, and watercourse, is insignificant compared to others in the area.

== History ==
In the late 17th century, Portugal and Spain began the occupation of the Banda Oriental; they succeeded in founding Colonia del Sacramento in 1680, Montevideo in 1726, the Fuerte de San Miguel in 1737, and the Fortaleza de Santa Teresa in 1762. The Treaty of Madrid (1750) settled boundaries between the mouth of the creek Valizas and Cabo Polonio. By order of the Governor of Montevideo, José Joaquín de Viana, in 1751, frontier military posts were created, with colonial guards on both sides of the Chuy stream, the result of the discussions that had prevailed in the courts of the Spanish and Portuguese crowns. The treaty expired in 1761 with the signing of the Treaty of El Pardo. In Europe came the Seven Years' War. At that time, Pedro de Cevallos ousted the Portuguese colony of Santa Teresa and San Miguel, and Chuy came to dominate the southern Rio Grande do Sul. The situation was unstable, however, and the signing of the Treaty of San Ildefonso on October 1, 1777, led to a clearer demarcation of dominions in South America.

In 1762 after the surrender of Colonia del Sacramento, Pedro de Cevallos went to the Portuguese, demanding the "eviction of the Yacuí River and areas of Rio Pardo, Santo Amaro, Rio Grande, San Gonzalo, San Miguel and Chuy, as well as Martín García Island and Dos Hermanas Island." In 1763, the Military Command at Maldonado was created to take care of security in the east. In 1772 Bernardo Lecocq developed the fortifications of Fuerte de San Miguel here. Eventually, however, Spain would lose influence over these territories.

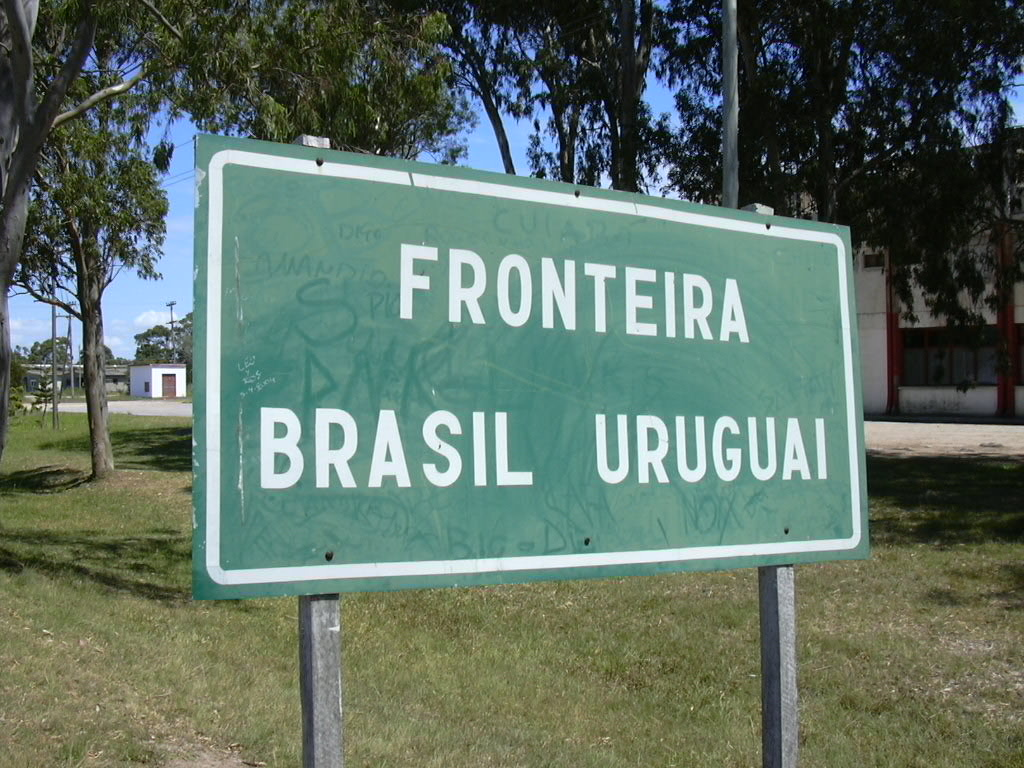
Border sign

For the sake of demarcating the Hispano-Lusitanian boundary, both Spain and Portugal brought to the area a significant number of scientists. Work in the Guardia de Chuy began in February 1784. It is presumed that in 1826, there was a farmhouse in Chuy, as Leonardo Olivera after the famous Sableada del Chuy, on the first day of the year, he wrote that it was a surprise to Brazilians, "leaving over twenty dead behind, as I mentioned to Your Excellency, I left a captain and a wounded soldier in a house of Chuy, not knowing where to take them, so that a certain family would take care of their wounds." The 1861 map of the area by Emilio Laviña includes a ranch, stalls and a store belonging to the firm Peyre Seijo & Co. In addition to this general trade store, there existed a chemist and a teacher named Marcelino Villazuso, who gave private lessons for many years. The growing importance of this border and the existence of military posts on the Brazilian side, prompted the authorities to install a police station or Comandancia de Frontera depending on Maldonado in 1872.

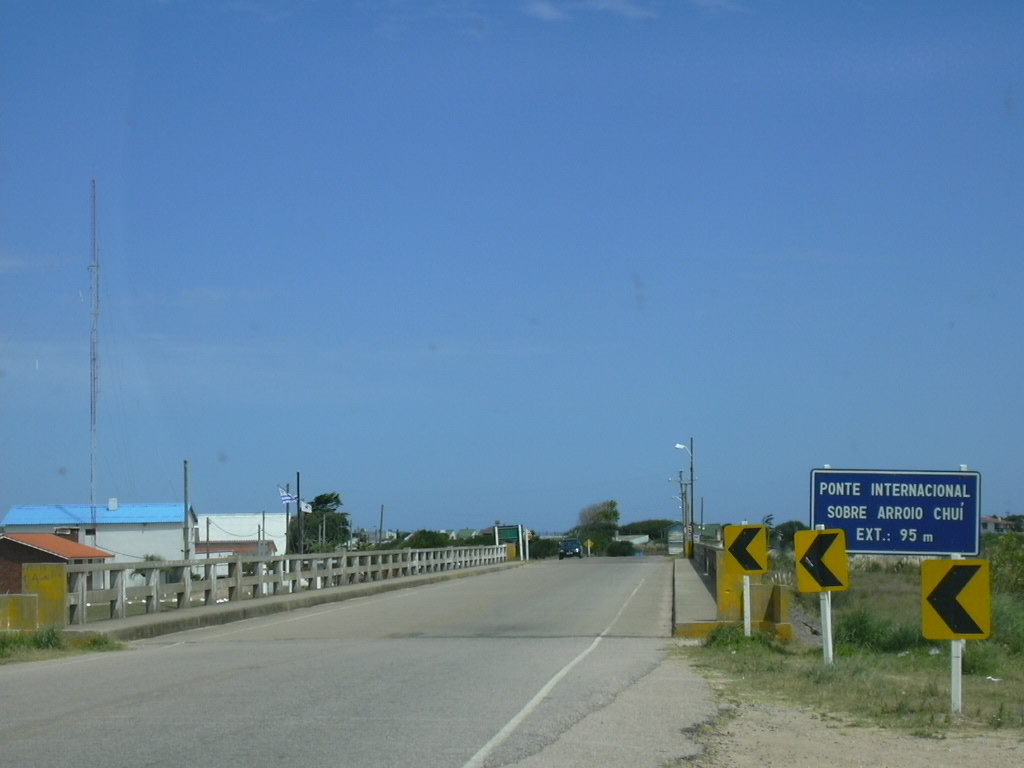
Bridge on the border

In 1888, the town was recognized as such by the department. The Economic Administrative Board Rocha urged neighbours to form a Neighbourhood Commission (first authorities to address local issues), and these were grouped immediately notifying the Honourable Board Rocha.

Uruguay and Brazil inherited differences resulting from the ongoing litigation, which would be amended in repeated boundary treaties with the placement of boundary markers in the twentieth century. On 7 May 1913, a convention was signed to amend the limit on the San Miguel river. On 20 December 1933 a Legal Status of Border was established and on 21 July 1972 bilateral notices were exchanged about the waterfront borders at the height of the mouth of the creek Chuy.

On 14 January 1938, the status of Chui was elevated to "Pueblo" (village) by the Act of Ley Nº 9.758. On 29 June 1961, it was elevated to "Villa" (town) by the Act of Ley Nº 12.887, and on 11 December 1981, it was further elevated to "Ciudad" (city) by the Act of Ley Nº 15.227.

== Geography ==
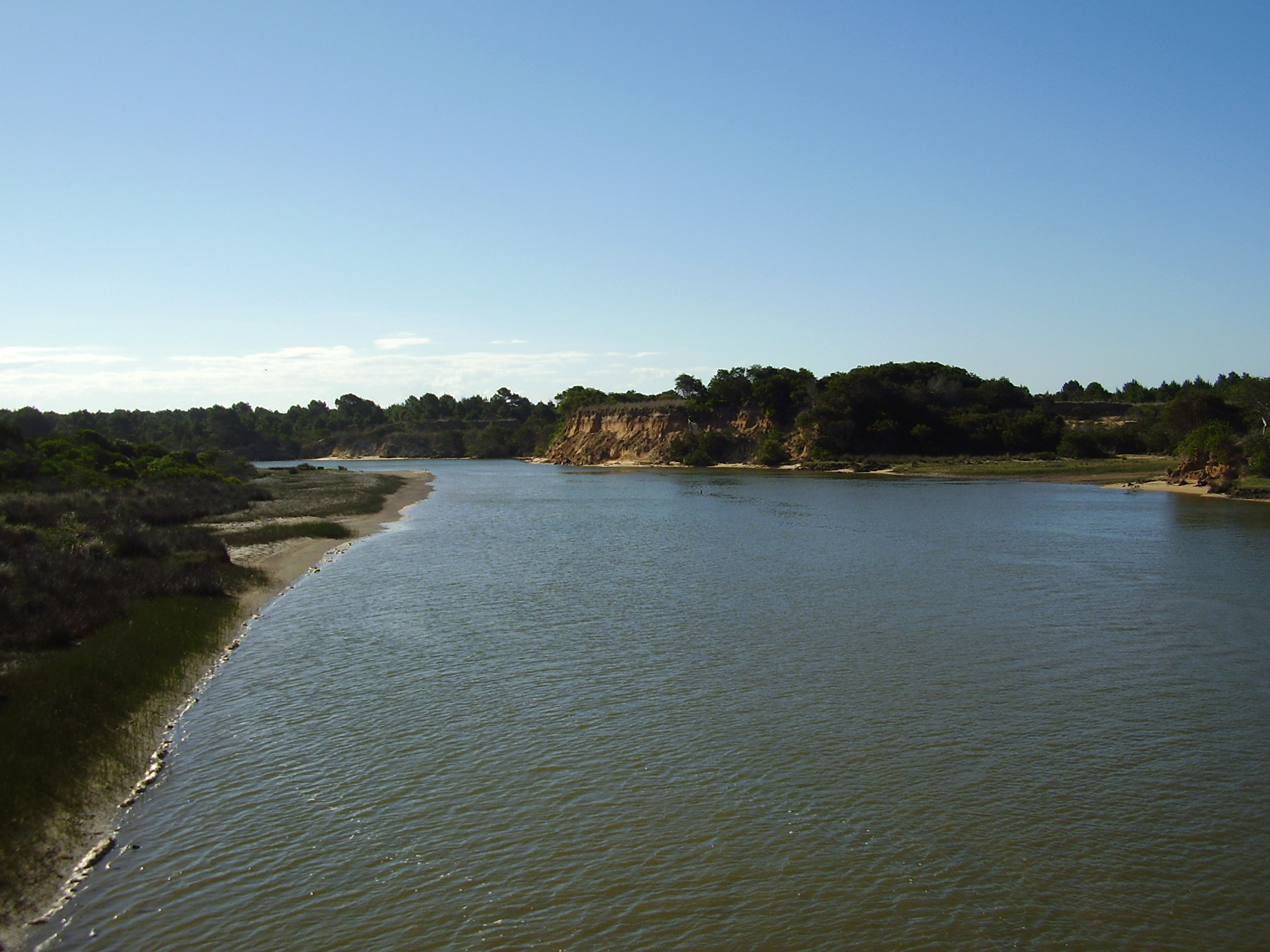
Arroyo Chuy

The town lies on National Route 9, 340 kilometres northeast of the capital, Montevideo, and only a few feet from Brazil's Route BR 471. Chuy is only 15 km from the Atlantic Ocean, and in the northern hinterland is located a similar distance from the Lagoa Mirim.

The BR 471 road in Brazil running from Porto Alegre and Pelotas borders the Chui town and passes through to Uruguay where it becomes Ruta 9. Each country's immigration office is located at the entry to the town. The main street, which is a two-lane road, is known as Avenida Uruguai ("Uruguay Avenue") in Brazil and as it passes to Uruguay, its name changes to Avenida Brasil ("Brazil Avenue"). The Brazilian town, Chui, has shops selling clothes, shoes and household goods while on the Uruguayan side, Chuy has duty-free shops and a casino.

== Demographics ==
Chuy's residents are mostly Uruguayans and Brazilians, with almost all its residents speaking Spanish and Uruguayan Portuguese. The council organizes cultural activities jointly with the neighbouring Brazilian town of the same name as the "Carnival Chuy-Chuí Without Borders".

There is a small but significant Palestinian Uruguayan population, mostly Muslims.

=== Population ===
According to the 2011 census, Chui had a population of 9,675.

Year	Population
1963	2,876
1975	4,521
1985	8,257
1996	9,804
2004	10,401
2011	9,675

Source: Instituto Nacional de Estadística de Uruguay

== Economy ==
It is a border city, adjacent to the Brazilian city of Chuí. Both cities share the main avenue which serves as the borderline. Chuy is a relatively thriving centre for trade with the Brazilians and has several shops to cater for tourists. It is not unusual for Uruguayans from the Montevideo area to make long journeys in order to purchase goods across the border which would cost significantly more at home. Many duty-free shops offer spirits, cosmetics, clothing, and luxury goods. There is a casino in Uruguay's Chuy, whereas gambling is forbidden on the Brazilian side.

== Notable landmarks ==
Hotels of note include Hotel Internacional, Chuy; Hotel Alerces; Nuevo Hotel Plaza; and several hostels/apartments. Estadio Samuel Prillac lies in the southeastern part of the town. The town is served by Chuy Hospital in the southern-central part. Another landmark near Chuy is the lighthouse 10 km away near the Barro du Chui inlet. Beaches here are relatively free of crowds, and sea lions can be spotted in the area.

=== Fuerte San Miguel ===
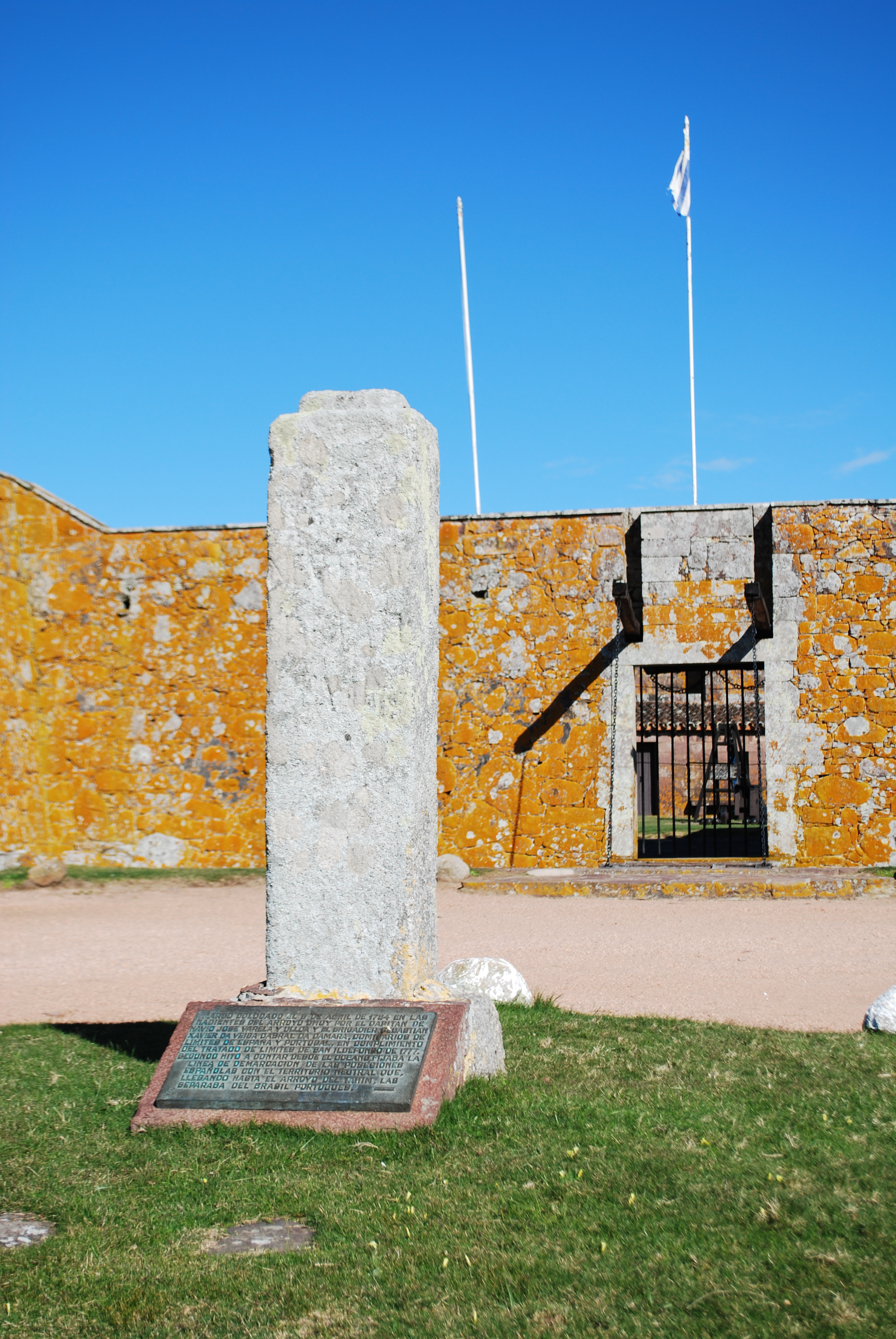
Fuerte San Miguel

The Fuerte San Miguel, 8 kilometres to the west, was built on top of a hill in 1737 (construction was started in 1734) with a square plan by the Portuguese. The fort, built with large and heavy stones to create the tall towers (four bastions), thick walls and sturdy ramparts to withstand onslaught of wars that were fought against the Spanish invaders was instrumental in Uruguay evolving as an independent nation. It was built in pink granite stones, is surrounded by a moat, and has been fully restored. It is located in the town of Dieciocho de Julio, 8 km west of Chui along a winding hill road.

However, over the years after the independence of Uruguay, the fort's walls started crumbling as it remained untended. The townspeople had the fort restored in 1927, by archaeologist Horacio Arredondo, who had similarly restored another old fort, Santa Teresa. It is now reconstructed with period architectural artefacts. The refurbished fort maintains the old moat with the drawbridge used for access to the fort during wars, and is surrounded by a well-tended garden. As a protected area, the diverse natural ecosystems has also been retained where native wildlife of Monkeys, birds, capybaras and guazubira are seen in the forests and marshland.

Under the administration of the Army, the structure is permanently open to visitors, harbouring a Museum of Military History, which highlights the collection of historical uniforms of the garrison, and the sample of the historical evolution of Army uniforms.

=== Fortaleza de Santa Teresa ===
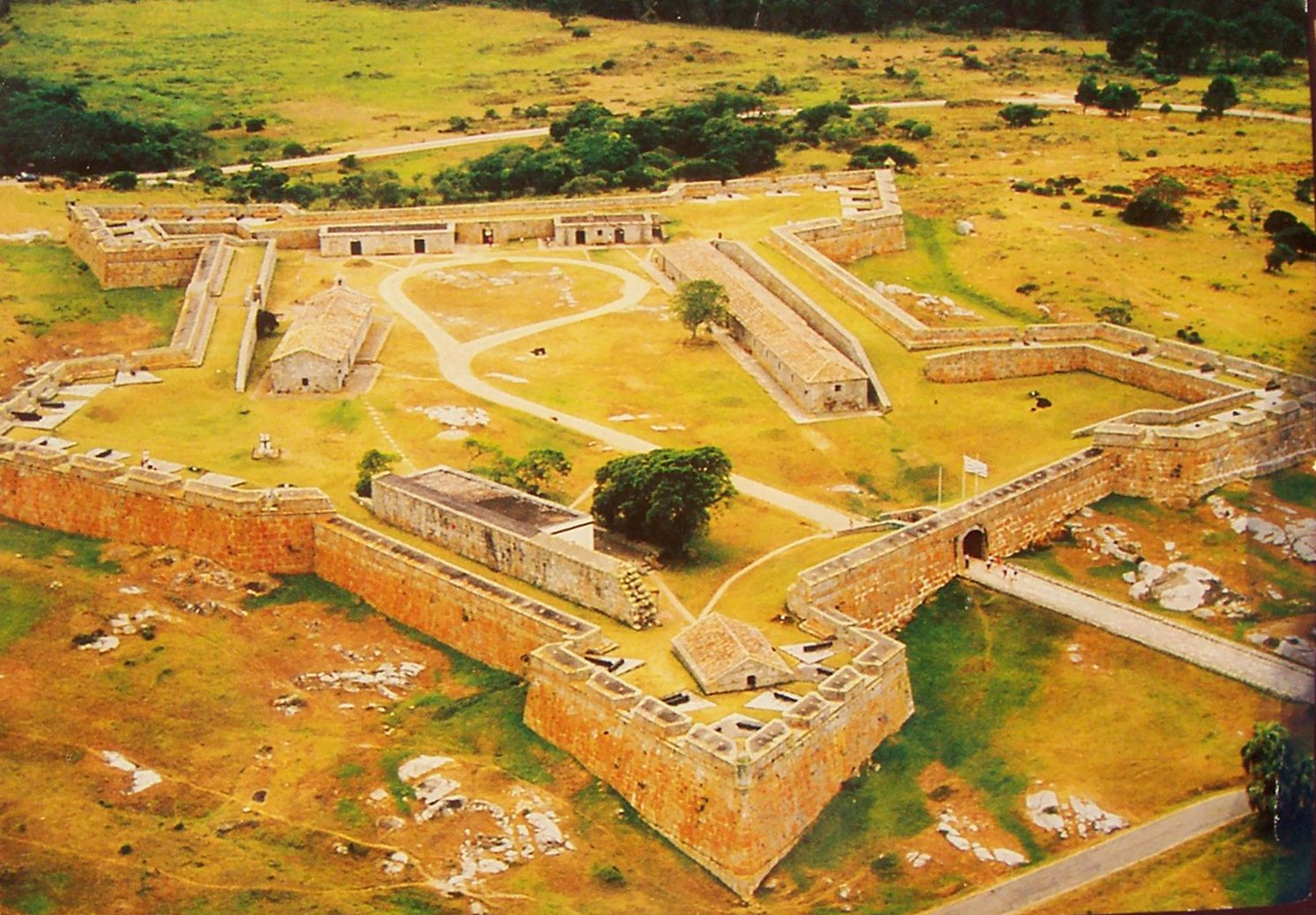
Fortaleza de Santa Teresa

Fortaleza de Santa Teresa which was declared a National Historic Monument by Law on December 26, 1927, has rich history of battles. It lies within the Parque Nacional de Santa Teresa 36 kilometres to the south. The fort erected in October 1762 witnessed many battles for its control. The Portuguese built it in 1762 in anticipation of war with Spain at the La Angostura path to Castillos Chico. Coronel Tomas Luis Onsorio started building the fort. However, construction was stopped in 1763 when Don Pedro de Cevallos Governor from Buenos Aires' captured the forts of Santa Teresa and also San Miguel. Construction of the fort was restarted in 1763 by the Spanish. The fort was built to an irregular pentagon plan with five bastions. It has a perimeter of 942 metres.

In 1797, to maintain law and order in the region, the Veteran Force of Blandengues of the Montevideo Border established in 1796, made it their headquarters. It came under Portuguese control during the Eastern Revolution after the Patriots were defeated. However, in 1812, the Patriots recaptured the Fort to exercise control over the border with Portugal. In 1816, the Portuguese invaded again and captured the fort along with the Eastern Province. The Liberty Crusade recovered it in 1825. In 1826, Coronel Leonardo Olivera of the Patriot Troops captured the fort. Finally, following the signing of the Preliminary Convention of Peace genesis by the Eastern State of Uruguay, and in 1828, with the signing of the Preliminary Convention of Peace agreement by the Eastern State of Uruguay, the Fort's importance declined. It was abandoned. The fort is now part of the San Miguel National Park, named after the fort, covering 3,000 hectares. The fort has been restored and is now major attraction for visitors to the park. The park also provides other attractions such as beautiful beaches and forested areas. The Uruguay army is in charge of the management and maintenance of Santa Teresa. It is located 36 kilometres south of Chuy, about 800 metres from the coast at Playa la Moza.

== Consular representation ==
Brazil has a Consulate in Chuy.

== Places of worship ==
- Parish Church of the Assumption of the Most Holy Virgin Mary (Roman Catholic)
