= List of lakes of Uruguay =

The following is a list of Lakes in Uruguay.

== Lakes ==
- Laguna de Castillos
- Laguna Garzón
- Laguna José Ignacio
- Laguna Negra
- Laguna de Rocha
- Laguna del Sauce
- Merín Lake
- Rincón del Bonete Lake

== See also ==
- Water resources management in Uruguay
