= National System of Protected Areas in Uruguay =

The National System of Protected Natural Areas of Uruguay (Spanish: Sistema nacional de áreas naturales protegidas de Uruguay, commonly abbreviated as SNAP) is an instrument of policy implementation and national environmental action plans for Uruguay.

Its creation was established by Law 17,234 of February 22, 2000, which was regulated by Executive Decree No. 52/005 of February 16, 2005. This law aims to "harmonize the criteria for planning and managing protected areas under certain categories, with a single regulation that sets the guidelines system" (Art. 1).

== Categories ==
Uruguay Protected Areas included in SNAP until 2013: 1-Quebrada de los Cuervos; 2-Esteros de Fárrapos; 3-Cabo Polonio; 4-Valle del Lunarejo; 5-San Miguel; 6-Laguna de Rocha; 7-Chamangá; 8-Cerro Verde e Islas de la Coronilla; 9-Rincón de Franquía; 10-Palace Cave; 11-Laguna Garzón; 12-Montes del Queguay; 13-Humedales del Santa Lucía.

According to Law 17234, four categories of definition and management of the protected natural areas were established (Art.3°):

- National park: areas where there are one or more ecosystems that are not significantly altered by human exploitation and occupation, plant and animal species; they are geomorphological sites and habitats that have special scientific, educational and recreational interest, or include natural landscapes which are considered of exceptional beauty.
- Natural monument: areas containing one or more specific natural elements of remarkable national importance, such as a geological formation, a unique natural site, species, habitats or plants that may be endangered. Areas where human intervention, if realized, is small in impact and is under strict control.
- Protected landscape
- Protection sites

== List of protected areas in Uruguay ==
Uruguay has 22 protected areas, covering 3.68% of the country's land area.

=== National designations ===
==== National parks ====
- Cabo Polonio National Park
- Esteros de Farrapos e Islas del Río Uruguay National Park
- Isla de Flores National Park
- San Miguel National Park

==== Natural monuments ====
- Grutas del Palacio Natural Monument

==== Protected landscapes ====
- Laguna de Castillos
- Laguna de Rocha
- Localidad Rupestre de Chamangá
- Paso Centurión y Sierra de Ríos
- Quebrada de los Cuervos y Sierras del Yerbal
- Valle de Lunarejo

==== Protected areas of managed resources ====
- Humedales del Santa Lucía
- Montes del Queguay

==== Habitat/species management areas ====
- Cerro Verde
- Esteros y Algarrobales del Río Uruguay
- Laguna Garzón
- Rincón de Franquía

=== International designations ===
==== UNESCO-MAB Biosphere Reserves ====
- Bañados del Este y Franja Costera
- Bioma Pampa Biosphere Reserve

==== Ramsar sites ====
- Bañados del Este
- Esteros de Farrapos e Islas del Río Uruguay National Park
- Laguna de Rocha
- Isla del Padre
