= List of national parks of Uruguay =

The following is a list of some of the National Parks in Uruguay.

== Wetlands/coastal ==
- Lagoons on Uruguay's east coast. Classified as a wetland of international significance under the Ramsar Convention.
- Laguna de rocha. Lagoon in Rocha.
- Castillos Lagoon. Freshwater lagoon in Rocha.
- Garzon Lagoon. Semi-freshwater lagoon in Rocha and Maldonado.
- Santa Teresa National Park. Includes beaches, forests and the Fort of Santa Teresa.
- Cabo Polonio. Includes beaches and sand dunes.

== Central Hill Country ==
- Lunarejo Valley. Located between Rivera and Artigas (on the border with Brazil). Native grassland, ferns and hill scrub, with small pockets of subtropical vegetation in the valleys.
- Quebrada de los Cuervos. Located near Treinta y Tres. Includes canyons and a subtropical forest in the bottom of the gorge.
- Arequita National Park. Located in 10 km (6 mi) north of Minas. Includes a large round mesa of volcanic rock and forests.

== Uruguay River ==
- Esteros de Farrapos National Park. Includes 24 islands, covering 174.96 km^{2}. Classified under the Ramsar Convention as a Wetland of International Significance.

== Caves ==
- Palace Cave in Flores. The geology dates from the Late Cretaceous period and is composed of sandstone, which formed during the Paleocene. Classified as a National Park in 2013.
