= Fortaleza de Santa Teresa =

Military museum in Uruguay

Coordinates: 33°58′20″S 53°32′55″W

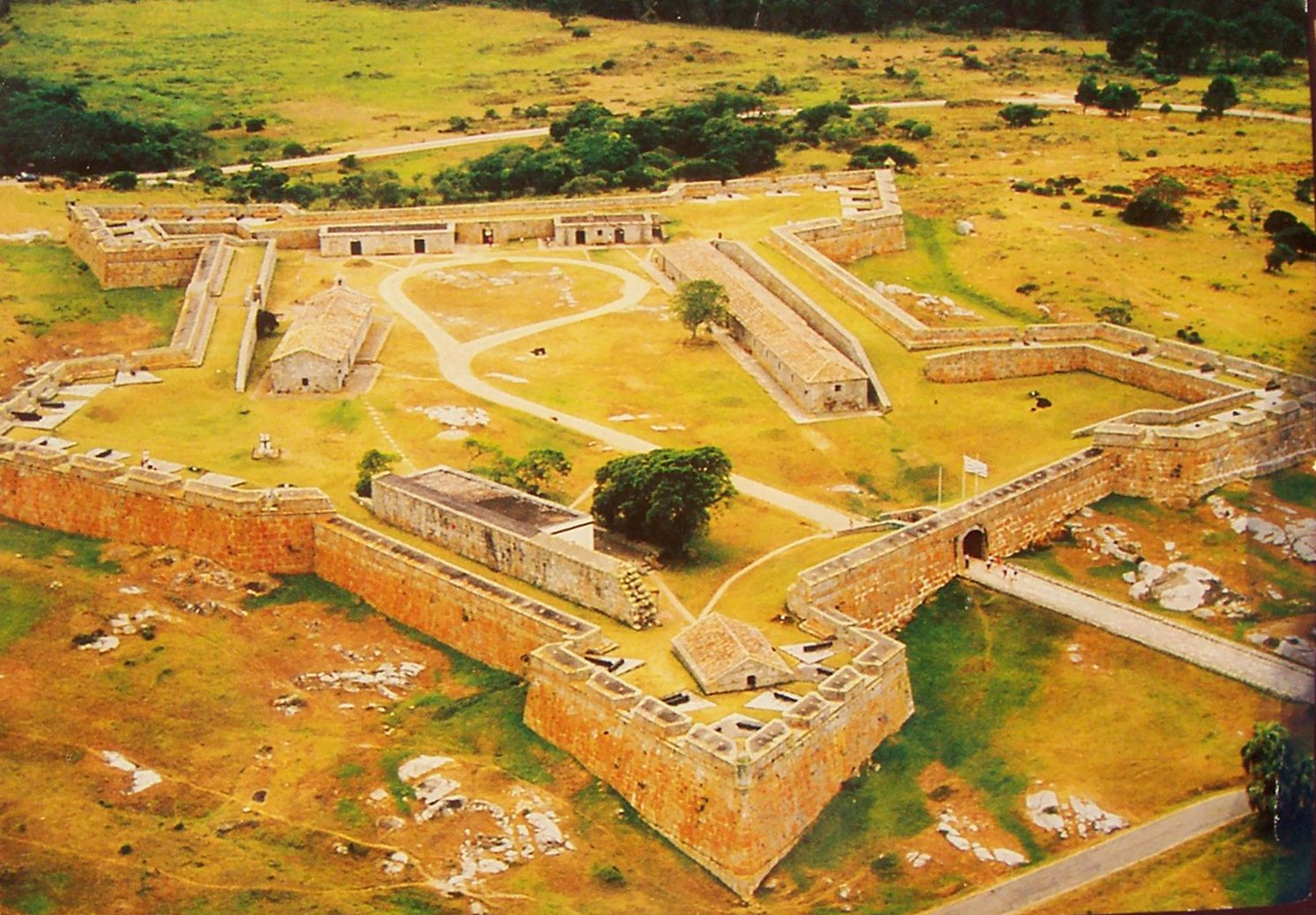
Fortaleza de Santa Teresa

The Fortaleza de Santa Teresa, or Fortaleza Santa Tereza is a military fortification located 36 km (22 mi) south of Chuy and 305 km (190 mi) northeast of Montevideo on Route 9, in the Rocha Department of eastern Uruguay. It lies about 800 m (2,600 ft) from the coast at Playa la Moza, almost halfway between Angostura (to the south) and La Coronilla (to the north), north of Punta del Diablo and roughly 4 km (2.5 mi) northeast of the northeast bank of the Laguna Negra. It lies within the Santa Teresa National Park. It was erected from October 1762 by the Portuguese, having abandoned the attempt at building a fort in Maldonado and leaving the Fuerte San Miguel.

== Topography ==
The region is characterized by vast expanses of dunes on the coast, as well as a series of wetlands located west and north. The fort was strategically located on a rocky outcrop at 58 m above sea level along the Camino de la Angostura, the only way through the marshes to the sea.

== Description ==
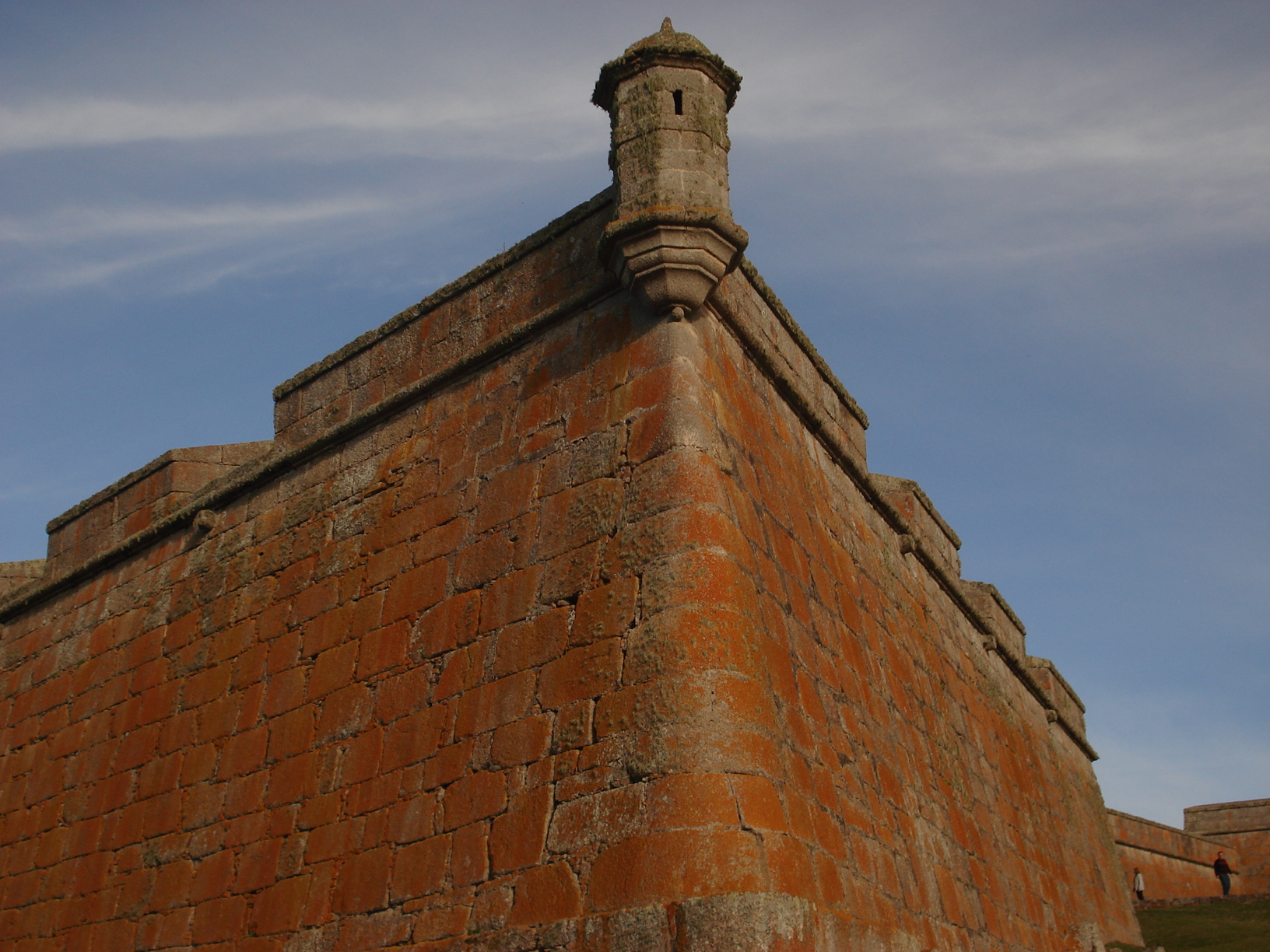
Wall of Fortaleza de Santa Teresa

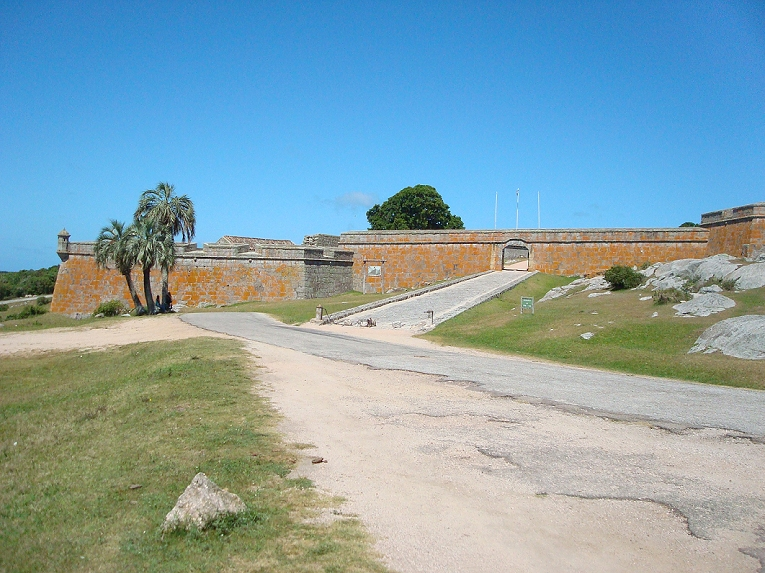

Walls

It has the shape of an irregular pentagon, and five angles are finished in projecting bastions. There are five checkpoints for each angle of the pentagon, elegantly constructed in the form of carved stone pulpit. The perimeter of the fortress measures 652 meters and it occupies one hectare in area.

The walls are massive, built with huge granite masonry, strictly equal in size and perfectly carved. The outer wall is about four feet thick at the base and about two meters, the interior, filling the space between one and another. A solid embankment in some places is up to 7 m wide. The height of the outside walls in some places reaches to 11.5 m.

Doors

“La puerta principal” It is built of solid wood arched at the top and looks to the west. “La Puerta oculta de socorro”. Looks south, and is of smaller proportions than “la Puerta Principal”. “El Túnel de la Trinchera” corresponds to what is now identified as a deep trench with walls of smaller stones located in front of the fortress in an east–west direction. “El Túnel del Arca”. is supposed to be hidden underground under the fort. According to oral tradition, it consists of three or more rooms connected by walkways and a large tunnel that goes to the East. The output would be found somewhere near the Atlantic Ocean about 2000 m away. The popular belief here is that a secret artifact is hidden underground called the Arca secreta del Padre Lucas.

Lodging

Inside the fortress it lodged a maximum of about 300 men. The interior construction, also of stone masonry, preserved in perfect condition from the colonial era, have been restored with care and replacement roofs added. These buildings are: the flag room and guardia on the sides of the front door, the main, which was formerly the chapel, two large blocks, and the "polvorín", built with huge blocks of granite and the cells.

Cemetery

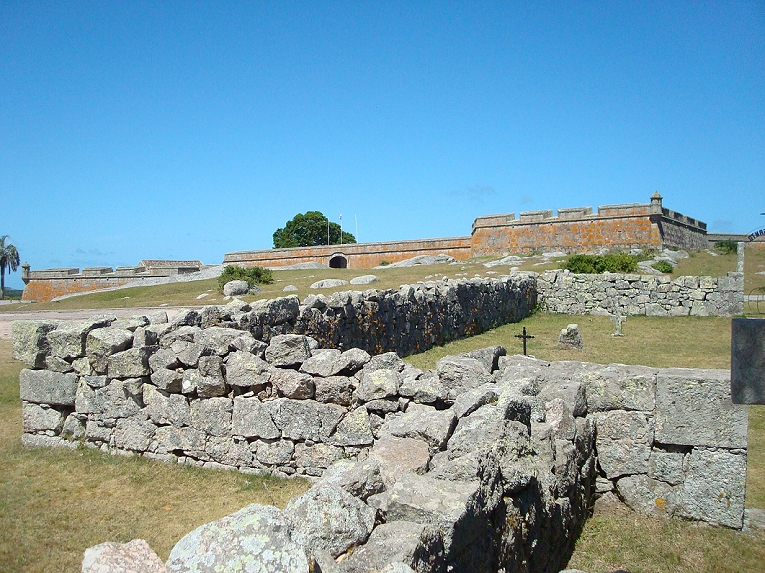
Cemetery

The cemetery is located a short distance from the west wall, and used from the second half of the eighteenth century to beyond the extinction of the fortress as such, since it continued to be in use in the neighborhood.

Enlisted men lie there, the strong Spanish garrison in the area, Spanish, slaves, Indians and Portuguese alike. Of major note are Agustín Lipopisi and Félix Sayobí, two Guaraní chiefs and missionaries of San Carlos y Chorpus, Cecilia Maroñas, daughter of the Spaniard Francisco Maroñas and Portuguese María Espíndola, one of the sons of Commander Alagón who attacked by a cougar in Potrerillo, and many others.

Like the fort, the small enclosure was built by the former Jesuit Lucas Marton, with convicts, and Guaraní Indians. It was designated as the first sector to be restored. Although the condition was not good, it maintained its original layout and stones, albeit collapsed, were in place. The small crosses are the original stone, not the large stone cross though, which was carved by the master mason Juan Buzzalini who served in the whole process of restoration of the fort.

== History ==
The current Fortaleza de Santa Teresa was built by the Spanish crown, though its foundation and name are due to Portugal. In the brief period from 1762 to October 1775, they built three forts.

The signing of the Treaty of El Pardo (1761) in practice nullified the Treaty of Madrid (1750). Governor and Captain General of the Captaincy of Rio de Janeiro, Gomes Freire de Andrade, anticipated its consequences for the southern region and ordered troops to the region. Bringing a little more than a thousand men, the Portuguese strategy was to quickly build a fortified defensive line, south of Fuerte San Miguel to stop the Spanish invasion in progress. After the conquest of Colonia del Sacramento in October 1762 by the governor of Buenos Aires, Pedro de Cevallos, the fort began construction with about 400 soldiers and armed with a few pieces of small arms. The site chosen was the strategical pass of Angostura near the Castillos Grande.

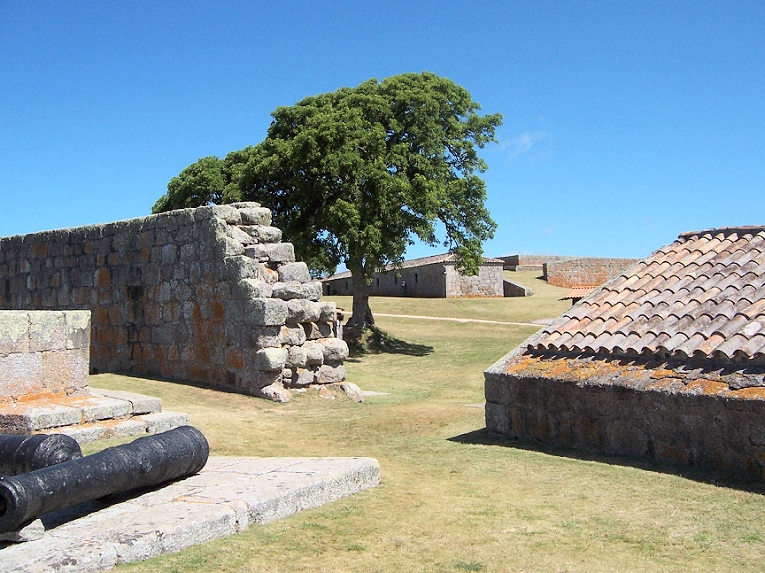

The fort, designed by Gómez de Mello, consisted of a trench dug in the slope of a hill site, known as Chico Castillo. The timber was moved from the area of Fuerte San Miguel, about 30 km distant, a daunting task for the time, because they had to ford countless streams and swamps.

On October 6, 1762, a cornerstone was laid at the foot of the foundation and the fort was given the name in honor of Saint Teresa. However, construction was halted due to the war. However, in the war between Spain and Portugal, the Spanish general Pedro de Cevallos ordered the construction of another fort, directed against Portuguese Brazil, designed by Francisco Rodríguez Cardozo. Materials were used from the building that had been started. Ceballos then continued on his way to São Pedro do Rio Grande, in the same month taking Fuerte San Miguel, near the Arroyo Chuí.

The Treaty of San Ildefonso (1777) confirmed the Spanish possession of the Fortaleza de Santa Teresa and the Fuerte San Miguel. A third fortification was built between 1765 and 1775, designed by engineer Bartolomé Howel and built by ex-Jesuit Lucas Marton and Guaraní Indians. With the imminence of a British invasion in 1775, Bernardo Lecocq worked to strengthen the structure of the fort as he did with the Fuerte San Miguel. Other repairs were made in 1797.

In 1776, a year after completing the construction of the Fortaleza de Santa Teresa, Portugal returned to threaten the Spanish in these parts of Latin America. Governor Juan José de Vértiz y Salcedo moved from Buenos Aires to organize the defense, pending General Pedro de Cevallos and his army to carry out a counterattack. Upon arrival, they received news of the signing of the peace treaty of San Ildefonso, suspending all activities. Cevallos nevertheless was promoted as Captain General and became first viceroy of Río de la Plata. From that time the fortress was held until 1828, with the emergence of the Eastern Republic of Uruguay, becoming state property. By the Treaty of May 15, 1852, which established the border demarcation at the mouth of the Chui Stream and the San Luis River, the two forts (San Miguel and Santa Teresa) remained in Uruguay.

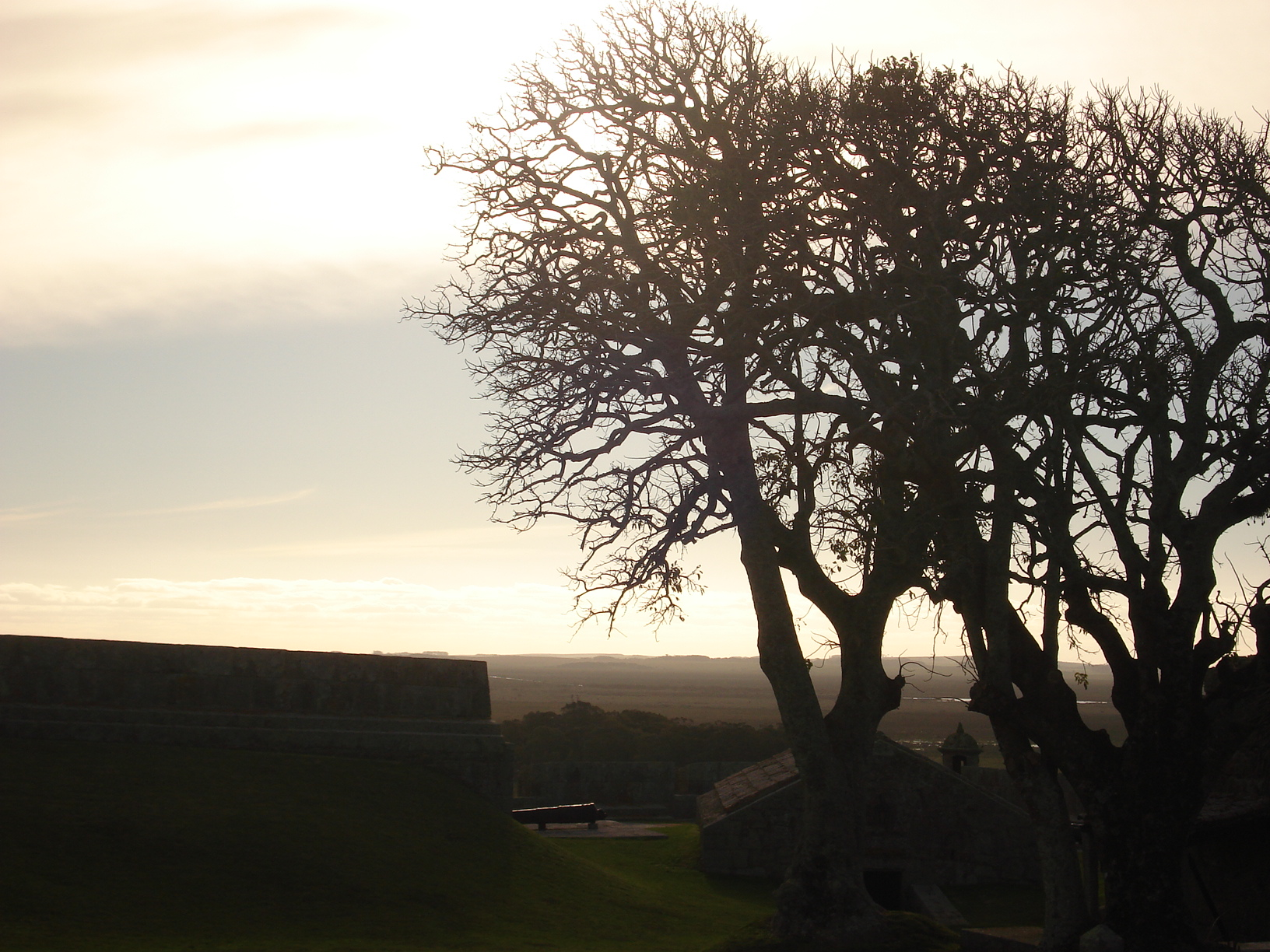
View

Once Uruguay was established, the state, for nearly a century, had no resources to preserve historical monuments. Thus began the decline of the Fortaleza de Santa Teresa. Nevertheless, it fulfilled its role as a watchtower on the border during the presidencies of Fructuoso Rivera and Manuel Oribe, between 1830 and 1843. During the so-called Guerra Grande in the mid-nineteenth century, it was occupied by Manuel Oribe, but afterwards the structure was abandoned. In 1895 it was reoccupied as a prison. However, the total abandonment came about and it served to shelter cattle and bats, the latter inspired the former president Dr. Baltasar Brum to write a literary composition based on an Indian legend of the place.

In 1921, under Brum, the historian and archaeologist Horacio Arredondo conceived and proposed to restore it and preserve the Fort of San Miguel and the Fortaleza del Cerro in Montevideo. In 1928 his plan was put into practice and the forts were restored. Since the 1940s, it has contained a museum and been a tourist site; one of the few bastions of the colonial era in Uruguay which still survives.

== Folklore and legends ==
The following legend was written by Baltasar Brum in 1930 based on an indigenous legend of the place. It recounts the formation of the hills with an emphasis on the origin of the Cerro Verde (the complete original version is on La Fortaleza de Santa Teresa).

"The Heart of stone siren"

According to the legend: the spirits of the elements that inhabited the seas and land, after the triumph of Christianity there, migrated to our continent in search of tranquility, but they were discovered and lost their freedom. Lovers of beauty and peace, they refused to fight against the human gods, and therefore, during a large gathering, decided to mutate in forms reminiscent of their passions. The land spirits sought refuge in the flowers, trees, pines and insects, while the marine ones in capes, promontories, reefs, seaweed, dolphins and seals.

Five sirens, Caaibaté, Maci, Manipeya, Cuñataí and Alua who lived in the seas were transformed into the Cerro Verde, and into the capes of Fortaleza, i.e. Moza, Chato, del Barco o del Naufragio and Árido. Caaibaté, was a siren loved in the South and in the North, who loved the former and disdained the later. Metamorphosed into the Cerro Verde she suffers the eternal harshness of the North rejected lover, who, with the help of the sunrise and sunset, suppliers of sand, isolated her from the ground, by covering her with dunes. The South prevents this, by circulating, with the caress of his breath, the sap that comes from the heart of the siren in order to give life to the lush green vegetation that covers her, in a triumphant defense of love over hate”.

== Bibliography ==
- "Libro de Honor de la Fortaleza de Santa Teresa". (A1930) Dr. Baltasar Brum and Horacio Arredondo
- "Diccionario Geográfico del Uruguay". (1900) Orestes Araújo.
