= Cabo Polonio =

- Hamlet
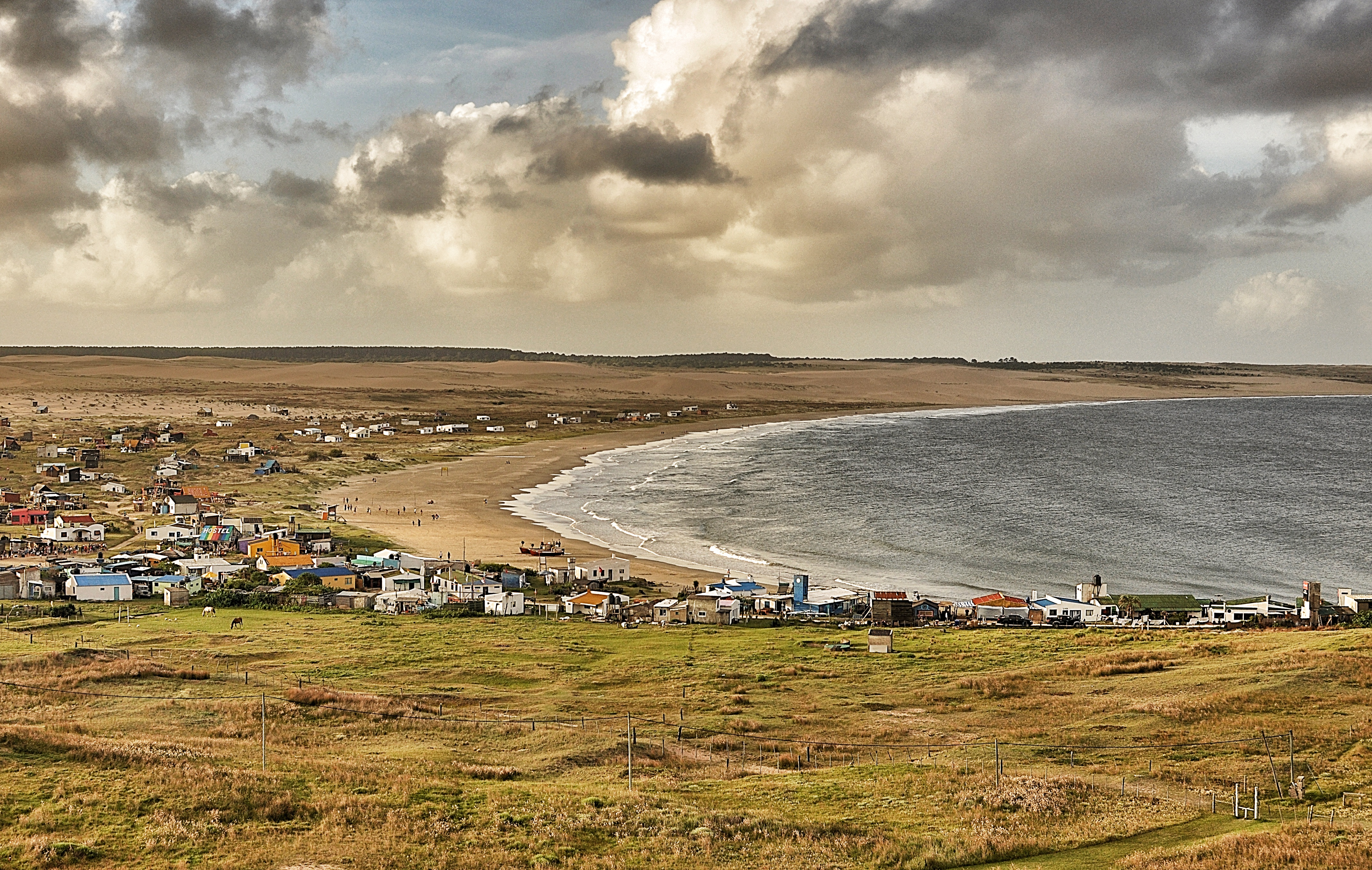
- Cabo Polonio in 2014

- Location in Uruguay
- Coordinates: 34°23′51″S 53°47′21″W
- Country: Uruguay
- Department: Rocha Department

Population (2023)
  - Total: 128
- Time zone: UTC -3
- Postal code: 27202
- Area code: +598 4475

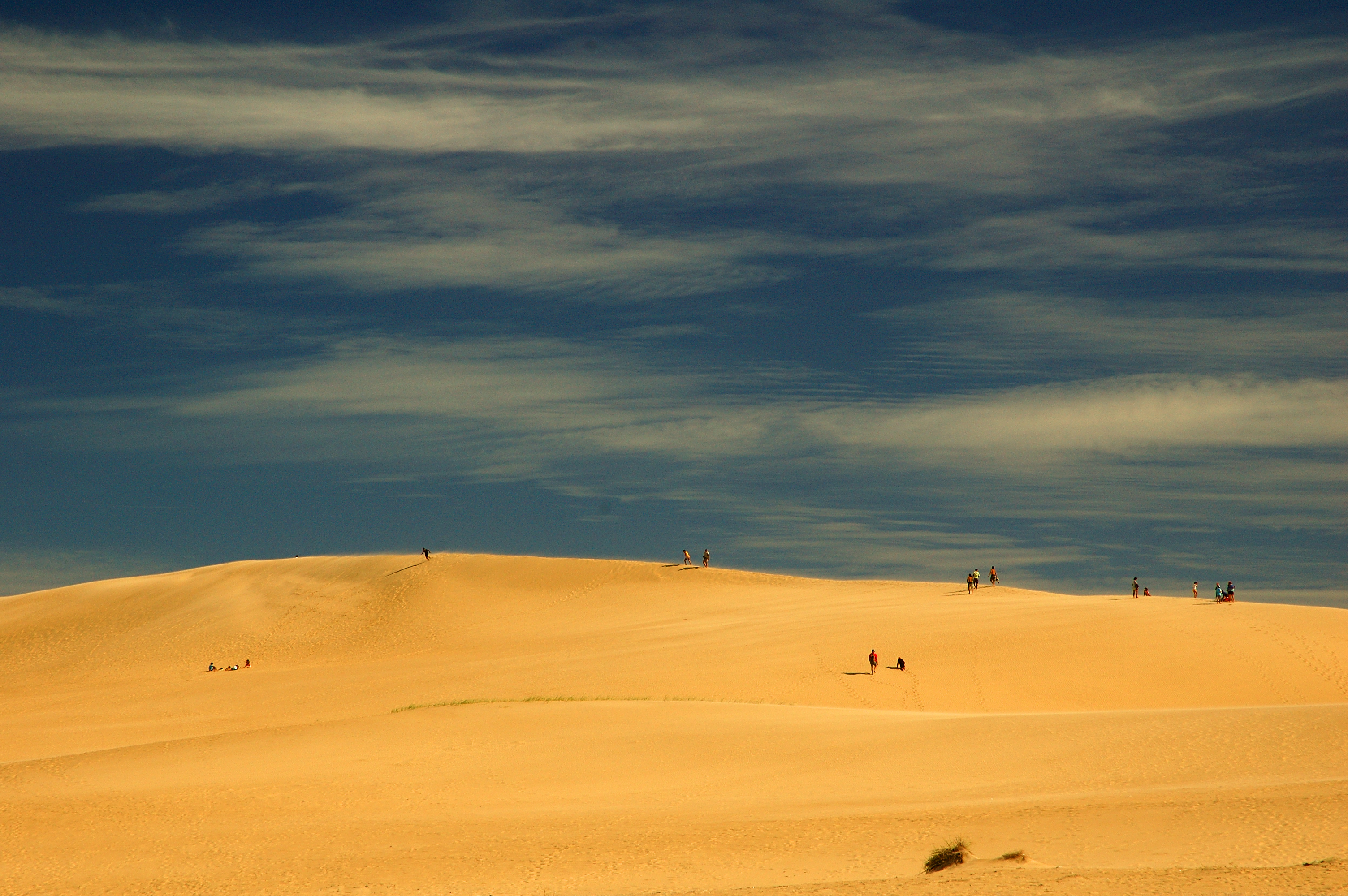
Sand dunes near Cabo Polonio

Cabo Polonio is a hamlet located in the eastern coast of Uruguay in the Rocha Department. It is located in one of the country's SNAP areas and is notable for its natural features. According to the 2023 census, it had a population of 128, but its population swells during the summer when it receives thousands of tourists.

Prior to Spanish colonisation, Cabo Polonio was inhabited by Indigenous Uruguayans who used the site to hunt the sea lion population concentrated on the islands off the cape. This practice continued during and after Spanish rule, and would lead to the establishment of the first homes on the cape for workers and their families in the 1800s. Despite continuous exploitation, the sea lion population continues to be the largest in Uruguay. Alongside the sea lions, Cabo Polonio is rich in natural features and is notable for its sand dunes. Cabo Polonio is also important for its number of shipwrecks, with the place taking its name from the captain of a ship shipwrecked in 1753.

Cabo Polonio has no roads leading to it and is located about 7 km from the main highway. It is accessible by walking through the dunes or by 4×4 vehicles. The region has no electricity or running water for the few houses of this town, and wind power and a few generators are used to power some of the posadas and grocery store. There is a lighthouse that gets power from the national grid. Residents obtain water from nearby water wells or collecting rain water.

== History ==
Human habitation of the Cabo Polonio area dates back to 5000 BC and was used to fish and hunt sea lions for over 6,000 years. Near the Valizas stream, mounds dating back to 5,000 years ago part of the Cerritos de Indios of Eastern Uruguay contain indigenous artefacts such as axes, ceramics and mortars. Up until the 21st century, seasonal migration to and from Cabo Polonio was common. Hunter gatherers occupied the area during the spring and summer, but migrated annually during the colder months to further inland. During the Spanish colonial period, Cabo Polonio was used to exploit the local sea lion population living on the Islas de Torres. The same islands were responsible for hundreds of shipwrecks since the 1500s. Cerro De La Buena Vista, the area's highest peak, served as a point marking the border between Spanish and Portuguese colonial holdings in South America as established by the Treaty of Madrid in 1750.

=== 18th and 19th centuries ===
At least 18 vessels, including those of Spanish, Portuguese, German and English origin, became shipwrecked in the Cabo Polonio area. On 31 January 1753, the Spanish vessel Nuestra Señora del Rosario, Señor San José y las Ánimas ran aground 200 metres (660 ft) from the south beach of Cabo Polonio whilst en route from Cádiz, Spain, to Buenos Aires in the Governorate of the Río de la Plata. When it sunk, the ship had 316 men on board who all survived. The ship's cargo was brought to shore before it broke after a week. Cabo Polonio is named after the Nuestra Señora del Rosario's captain José Poloní, who was 25-years old, and the ship was also nicknamed the "El Polloní". The event serves as a foundation story for the community. Many objects from this and other shipwrecks were later collected by the local population, who see such possession as a privilege.

In 1795, the government of the Viceroyalty of the Río de la Plata granted 12,000 hectares (30,000 acres) of land in the area of Laguna de Castillos, including Cabo Polonio, to Jose Techera Caballero and Miguel Veiga.

The Cabo Polonio lighthouse was completed in 1881 and led to a decrease in the frequency of maritime accidents - although they continued to occur. In 1892, the Brazilian monitor Solimões was dispatched to help transport soldiers up the Paraguay River to quell a rebellion in Matto Grosso state. However, the ship struck a rock off Cabo Polonia between Isla de Torre and Isla Encantada, and sunk on May 19. Only five men survived whilst 123 men drowned. Around the lighthouse, the first permanent settlement of sea lion hunters and fishing families were established.

=== 20th and 21st centuries ===
In the 1940s, the villagers of Rincón de Valizas 5 kilometres (3.1 mi) were expelled by the government and resettled in Cabo Polonio.

On 13 April 1971, the Brazilian vessel Tacuarí ran aground on the island El Islote off Cabo Polonio during the middle of a day with good weather. The Tacuarí was en route from Houston to Buenos Aires carrying chemical materials, and the resulting accident led to the pollution of the coast of Rocha and Southern Brazil and the death of marine organisms. This pollution may have led to the mass death of marine animals off the Uruguayan and South Brazilian coast in 1978, although the military government of Brazil stated it was the result of a red tide.

== Geography ==
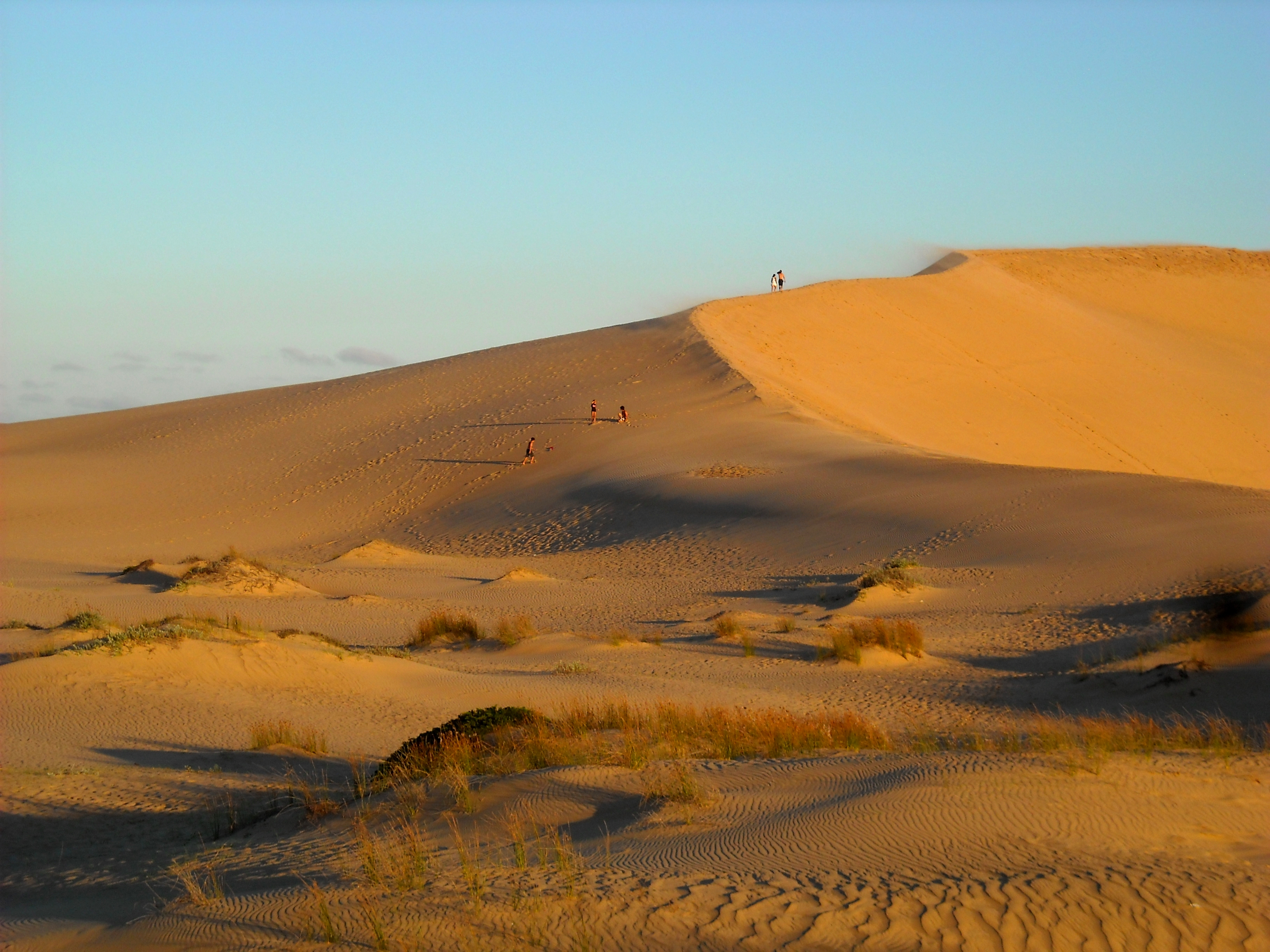
The sand dunes of Cabo Polonio, 2011. Once prevalent along the coast of Rocha, they are now isolated to Cabo Polonio.

Cabo Polonio sits on the tip of a peninsula that extends into the Atlantic Ocean, and is attached to the mainland by a tombolo formed by sand deposits brought by wind. The eastern foreshore is characterised by rocky outcrops of quartzites, gneisses, and phyllites - metamorphic rocks resistant to weathering and erosion. Cabo Polonio processes an extensive field of mobile sand dunes and more stable dunes stabilised by vegetation cover. Some dunes can reach 30 metres (98 ft) in height. Present dune types include parabolic dunes, transverse dunes, and barchan dunes. Human activity has contributed to a deterioration of the dune system, largely the result of afforestation. The Ministry of Livestock, Agriculture, and Fisheries has operated tree plantations in the area since the 1960s. In the 1970s and early 1980s, about 800 hectares (2,000 acres) were planted with pine and acacia. The largest impact these new forests had was disrupting normal wind actions and movement of sand, which created conditions that favoured the growth of psammophilous grasses who stabilised the dunes and prevented further movement. A decrease in the height of these dunes followed. In the 1990s, some afforested areas were removed to help the dunes recover.

The topographic features of the coastal plains on the Atlantic coast of Uruguay were formed over the last 5,000 years through the successive transgression and regression of the ocean, which created parallel dune ridges. Mobile sand dunes were prevalent along the coast of the Rocha Department, shaped by south-western and north-eastern winds, until the mid-20th century and are now limited to the Cabo Polonio area. Playa Nolte and Las Calaveras, small cliffs in Cabo Polonia, have beach ridges formed by the marine transgressions of the Middle Holocene.

Cabo Polonio and the surrounding area are characterised by a humid temperate to humid subtropical maritime climate. Its average annual temperature is 16 °C (61 °F), reaching a maximum of 21–21.5 °C (69.8–70.7 °F) in January to a minimum of 10.9 °C (51.6 °F) in July. The average annual relative humidity is 80%. For the hydrology of Cabo Polonio, it has continuous aquifers of generally good water quality - although they are highly vulnerable to contamination and salinisation due to their proximity to the surface and Atlantic.

Cabo Polonio and the surrounding area of land and sea are currently protected due to their natural value. On 16 September 1942, a forest reserve encompassing Cabo Polonio and the Valizas Creek basin was created. On 5 July 1966, the National Council of Government declared the dune system between Cabo Polonio and Punta del Diablo a natural monument. In 1976, UNESCO added Cabo Polonio to its World Biosphere Reserve program as part of the Bañados del Este Biosphere Reserve. On 22 May 1984, it and the nearby lagoons Castillos and Negra were designated as a Ramsar site. The Uruguayan government has included the area into the SNAP (Sistema Nacional de Áreas Protegidas) National System of Protected Areas since 2009. The SNAP area in total covers 25,820 hectares (63,800 acres). 4,653 hectares (11,500 acres) of the SNAP area is land whilst 21,151 hectares (52,270 acres) covers the adjacent portion of the Atlantic Ocean. Also covered are 16 islands. Cabo Polonio is part of the ecoregion of the sedimentary basin of Laguna Merín and the Atlantic coast.

=== Vegetation ===
Cabo Polonio's vegetation is mainly herbaceous and shrub ecosystems. The vegetation on mobile dunes are pioneer species who help stabilise them. A study conducted between 2000 and 2002 at Cabo Polonio identified 155 species of plants living in the area, with the Asteraceae family being the most prevalent. Of the 155 species, 133 were native. Much of the vegetation around Cabo Polonio possessed adaptions needed to tolerate the abiotic stresses present in the area, such as high salinity. Halophytic (salt tolerant) species were prevalent and had several adaptions, such as succulent leave and salt-excreting glands, to survive the high osmotic pressure. Psammophilous species (plants able to thrive in sandy areas) were also present.

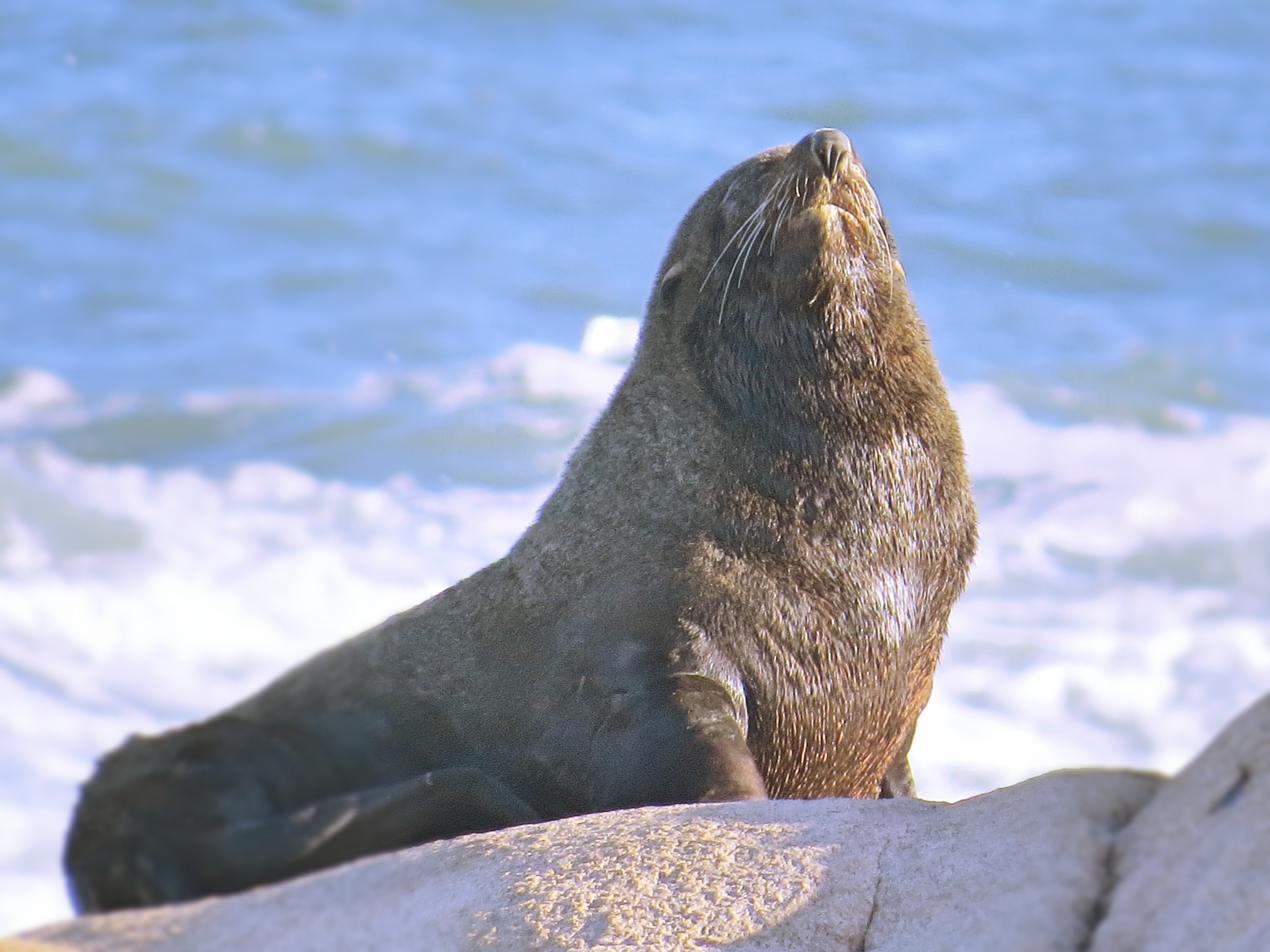
Photo of a sea lion from Cabo Polonio, 2014. Although historically hunted, their population at Cabo Polonio makes up almost half of Uruguay's population of sea lions.

=== Wildlife ===
There are three rocky islands off Cabo Polonio known collectively as the Islas de Torres. These islands host the largest sea lion population in the region and almost half of Uruguay's population of South American fur seals and South American sea lions. They use the Islas de Torres as a breeding ground. The sea lion population has been exploited by hunter gatherers since the pre-Columbian era, and exploitation continued under Spanish colonial rule. Following Uruguay's independence, private companies managed the exploitation of sea lions until 1912 when the state seized control. In 1932, sea lion exploitation was handed back to private concessionaires. In 1949, the Oceanographic and Fisheries Service permanently nationalised sea lion exploitation and the administration of the culling, processing and sale of sea lion oil and skins for export came under the control of the State Sea Lion and Fishing Institute in 1981. Sea lion hunting in Uruguay was banned in 1992. Sea lion hunting was integral to the early economy of Cabo Polonio and the first structures established in the area were warehouses to process hunted sea lions. The workers then established the town. Alongside sea lions, wolves were hunted until that was banned, also in 1992. In the 2022 to 2024 outbreak of H5N1 (avian influenza) in South America, sea lions along the Uruguayan and South Brazilian coast died to the disease, including at Cabo Polonio.

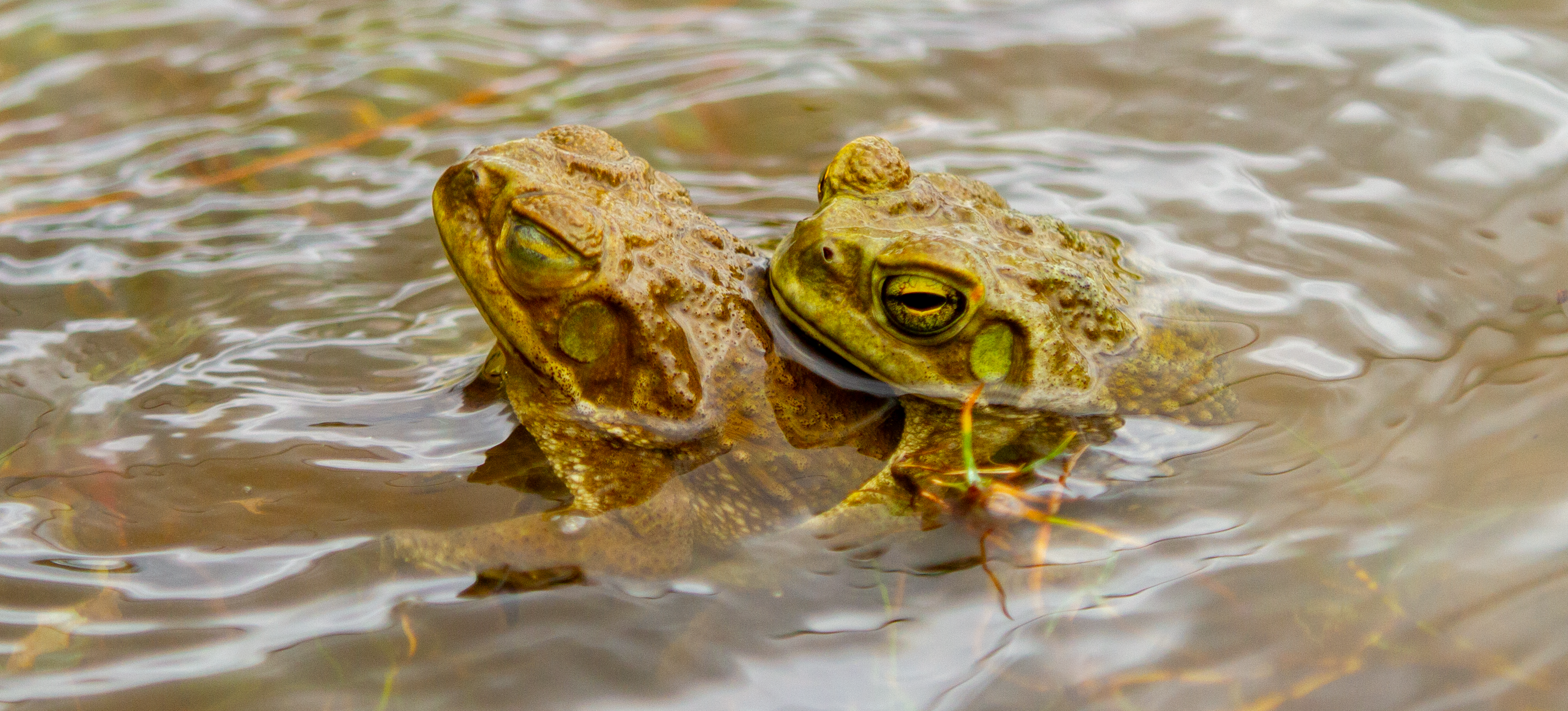
A pair of toads (Rhinella arenarum) mating at Cabo Polonio.

A little north of the Islas de Torres are the Islas de Castillo Grande, who lack the sea lions but are used by the subantarctic fur seal (Arctocephalus tropicalis) who also occupy the coast. Both the Torres and Castillo Grande island groups are used by the kelp gull (Larus dominicanus) and the American oystercatcher (Haematopus palliatus) as nesting colonies. In the Atlantic waters off Cabo Polonio, more than 47 fish species use the area as a breeding ground. Orcas, dolphins and whales are also known to use these waters, as well as turtles.

In the dunes, the dominant group of vertebrate are the tuco-tuco, a type of rodent. Insects of the dune are mainly necrophagous and detritivorous species who help decompose carcasses on the coast and are the main food source for the Rhinella arenarum, a specie of South American toad. Since the main habitat of the common miner (Geositta cunicularia), a South American bird, are arid and semi-arid areas, a significant portion of the Uruguayan population is found in the Cabo Polonio dunes. Additionally, Cabo Polonio was the home of a darker variant of the five-fingered green lizard (Cnemidophorus lacertoides) that is believed to have gone extinct due to human activity. The false sharp-nosed racer (Lystrophis dorbignyi) snake is abundant in the dunes.

=== Islands ===
Off the coast of Cabo Polonio are three rocky islands - Isla Rasa, Isla Encantada, and El Islote - known collectively as the Islas de Torres. These islands are almost without vegetation. The Islas de Torres were initially named after Rodrigo Álvarez, who was the Spanish captain of Sebastián Cabot's expedition to South America in 1526. They were later called the Las Onzas by the 1530-1532 Portuguese expedition of Pero Lópes de Souza due to the presence of two jaguars. The Las Onzas disappeared from Portuguese maps in the 1600s and never appeared on Spanish ones. The present name was given by Diego de Alvear y Ponce de León in 1777 and appear the 1794 Río de la Plata chart. Isla Encantada is named for its presence of pigeons, who were "enchanted" to sea lion hunters, and was first mentioned by Diego Novoa in 1826.

== Living conditions ==
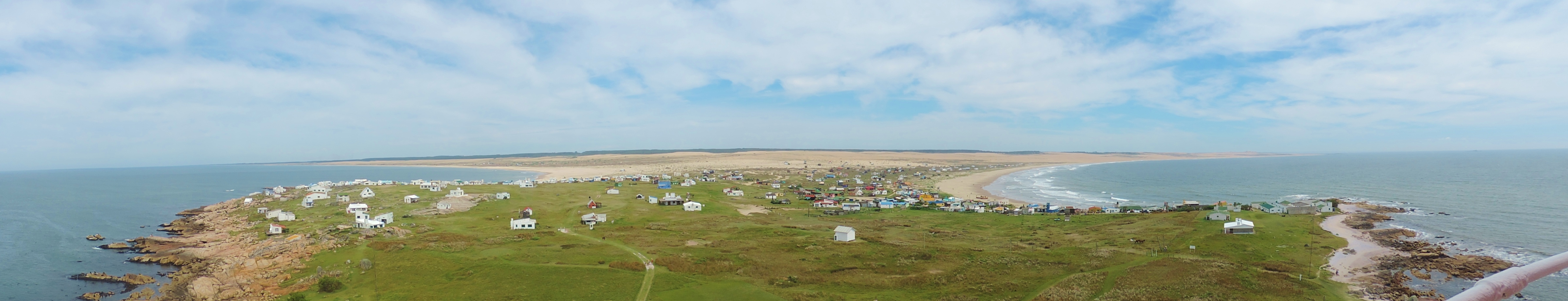
Panorama of Cabo Polonio from 2014. This image was taken near the end of the peninsular Cabo Polonio is located on, and shows southwest to northeast from left to right.

It is estimated that, in 2024, about 500 people lived in Cabo Polonio but only less than 100 were permanent residents. In the 2023 census, Cabo Polonio had a population of 128 inhabitants, and increase from 95 in the 2011 census. The number of registered houses has also increased, from 128 in 1985, to 226 in 1996 and 458 in 2004. The construction of homes, on both private and public land, appeared spontaneous. A majority of the homes are unoccupied outside of the summer tourist seasons. In 2004, 94% of houses were used only in the summer.

Cabo Polonio lacks running water and electricity from state power plants. Drinking water is collected either from rainfall or boreholes. There exists no health services and garbage collection by municipal authorities is limited to the summer. There does exists a school and police station. Despite this, there exists resistance from the local community to 'modernise'. In a 2013 survey, 85% opposed the electrification of their homes and 63% were opposed to any extensions of the power lines. A large part of the tourist appeal of Cabo Polonio is the appeal for a glimpse into pre-urban life.

== Tourism ==
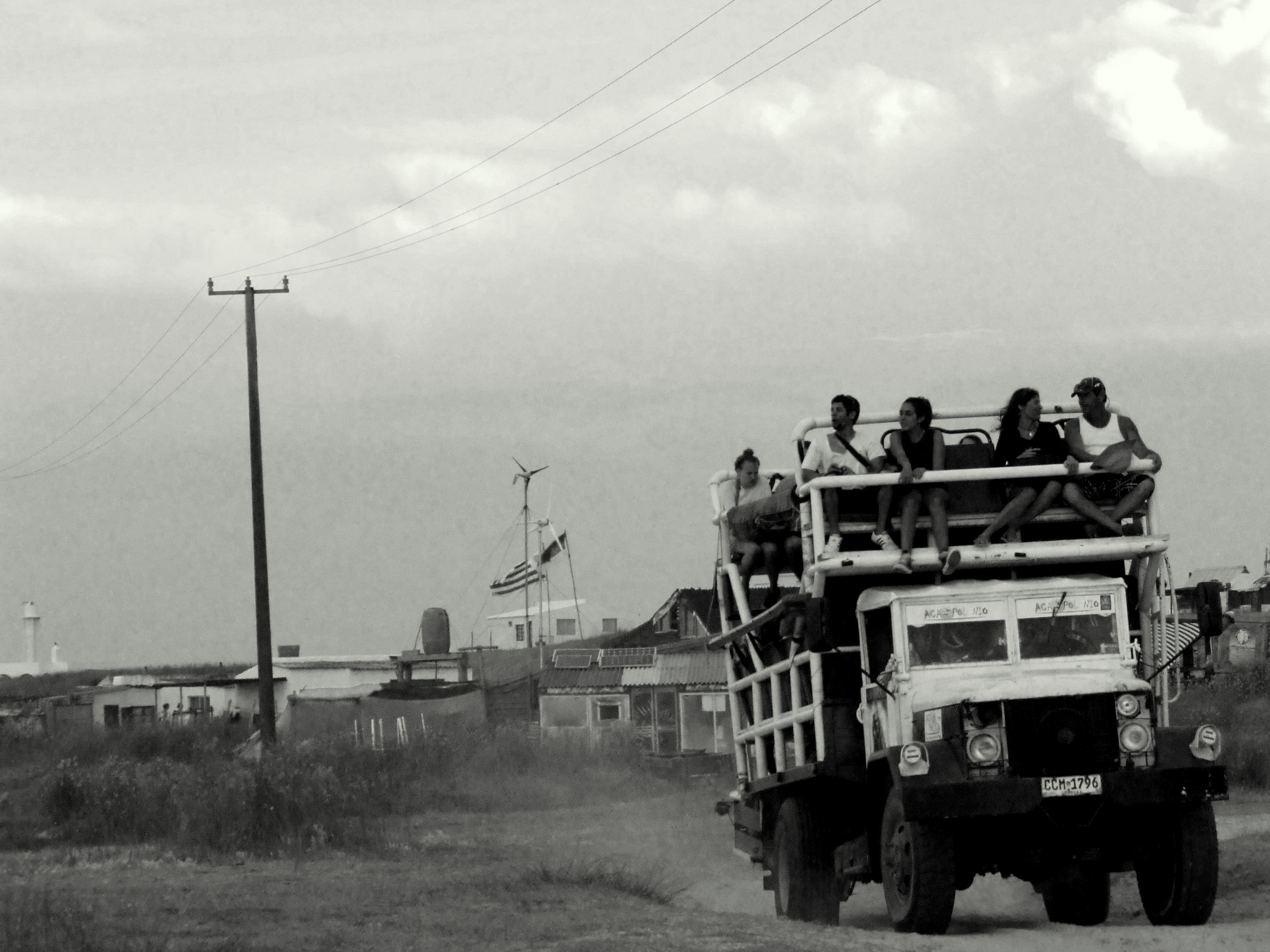
Photo of some of the vehicles used to transport people across the sand dunes, to and from Cabo Polonio.

The Atlantic coast of Uruguay has experienced a growth in "sun and beach" tourism since the late 20th century, with growth particularly focuses around the coast of the Rocha department. Due to slow urbanisation and a sparse population, Rocha has built a tourist image around wilderness. Tourism is Cabo Polonio's main socioeconomic activity and is among Rocha's most internationally prestigious areas. Cabo Polonio is often presented as a traditional village without the modern features that dominate other tourist towns. During the summer months, Cabo Polonio sees a massive influx of tourists. In January 2015, more than 30,000 tourists visited the cape.

Tourism to Cabo Polonio began during the last half of the 20th century and allowed for services, such as grocery stores and dining establishments, to be established. In the 1980s, housing construction on public and private land increased significantly "due to a cultural shift in tourism associated with a demand for forms of leisure and recreation that depart from the conventional model towards a 'spontaneous' one, allowing for a more intimate experience with nature, in more rustic conditions, with a stronger social connection to local residents". Favourable exchange rates between the Uruguayan peso and Argentine peso since 2023 has caused a tourist boom for Cabo Polonio, prompting fishing families to dedicate themselves more to the construction of new houses and tourist services. This was also assisted by the replacement of traditional horse-drawn carriages by four-wheel drive vehicles capable of transporting more passengers in a shorter time.

Mass tourism to Cabo Polonio has negatively impacted the area's natural features and ecosystems. Increased and uncontrolled vehicle traffic negatively affect the dunes they traverse. Serious health risks are also created when Cabo Polonio's population swells with tourists in the summer due to a lack of water for drinking and sanitation.

== In popular culture ==
Cabo Polonio is the setting for events spread over a 36-year period in Caro De Robertis' novel Cantoras p

Published in 2019.

It is also the setting for much of the story in Pedro Mairal's last novel, Los Nuevos (Buenos Aires: Emecé, 2025)
