= Laguna Negra =

Laguna Negra is the Spanish translation for "black lagoon". It may refer to:

- Laguna Negra, a lake in Catamarca Province, Argentina
- Laguna Negra, a lagoon in Rocha Department, Uruguay
