= Santa Teresa National Park =

Natural park in Uruguay

Coordinates: 33°59′0″S 53°33′0″W

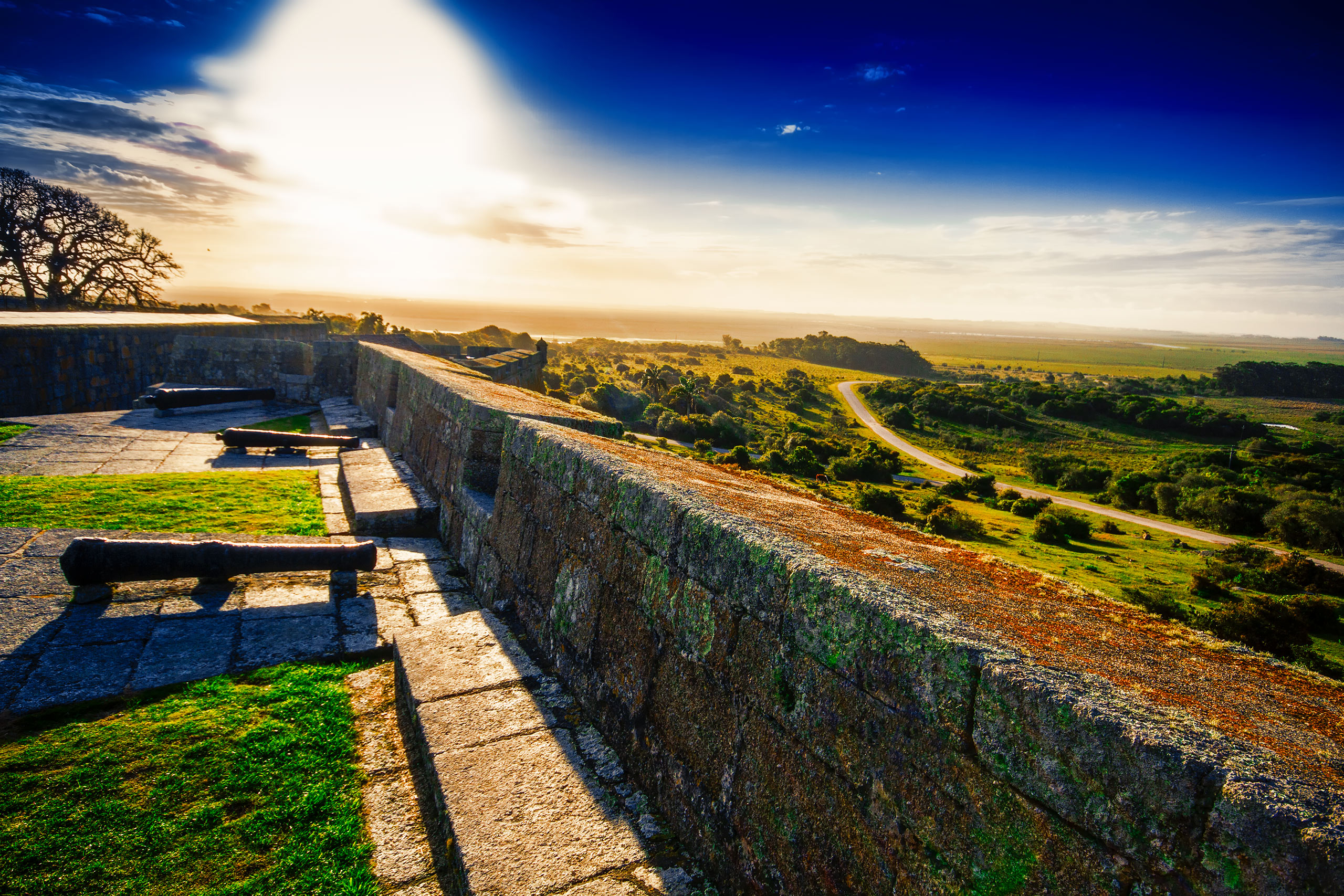
View from Fort of Santa Teresa

Santa Teresa National Park is a seaside forested area in Rocha Department which is an important national park of Uruguay. It is operated by the National Army of Uruguay. It is located in the Atlantic coast southeast of Route 9 at the northeast side of Laguna Negra and just north of Punta del Diablo.

Within its limits are sandy beaches, a nature reserve hosting several species of animals, an extended camping area, a greenhouse with a wide variety of plants and the historic Fort of Santa Teresa. The area is supervised and maintained by the armed forces.

On the northwest side of the park, on Route 9, is a two kilometer emergency landing corridor for airplanes.

== Beaches ==
The beaches along the coast of the resort, from southwest to northeast are Playa de los Pesqueros, Playa del Barco, where there are also some houses that serve as resort of military personnel, Playa Achiras, Playa La Moza. Between the last two is a promontory on which there are cabins to rent. Directly to the northwest of the promontory is the Fort area.
