= Laguna Garzón Bridge =

Bridge in Uruguay

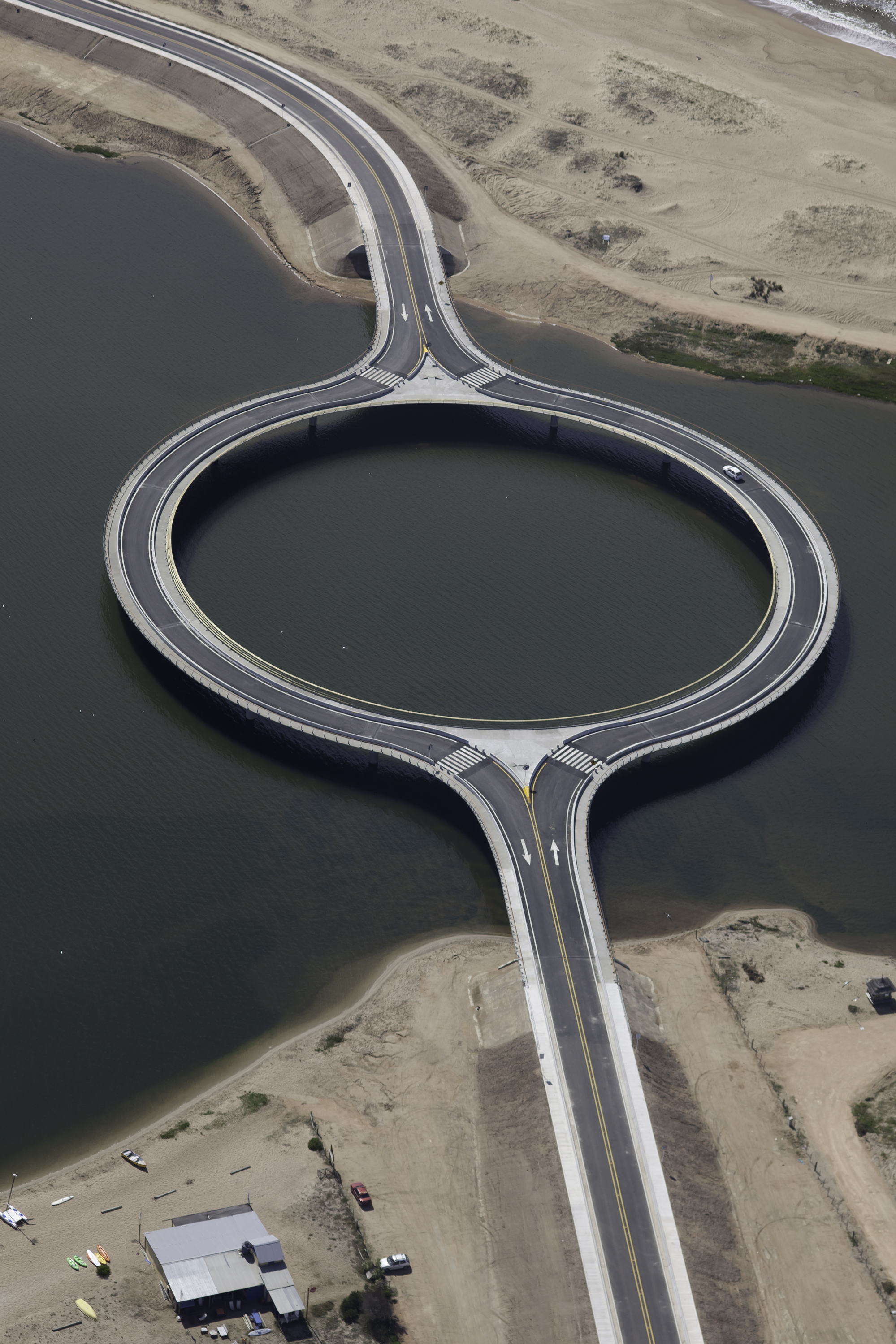
- Laguna Garzón Bridge
- Coordinates: 34.8024°S 54.5721°W
- Carries: 2 lanes of roadway (1 either side of circle), pedestrians and bicycles
- Crosses: Garzón lagoon
- Locale: Connecting Rocha Department and Maldonado Department.
- Official name: Laguna Garzón Bridges

Characteristics
- Material: Steel, concrete

History
- Designer: Rafael Viñoly
- Construction start: September 2014
- Opened: 22 December 2015; 10 years ago

Location
- Interactive map of Laguna Garzón Bridge

The Laguna Garzón Bridge (Spanish: Puente de la Laguna Garzón) is a bridge crossing the Laguna Garzón in Uruguay, on the border between the Maldonado and Rocha departments. The bridge is famous for its unusual circular shape, and was designed by Uruguayan architect Rafael Viñoly. Laguna Garzón was previously served by a small two-vehicle ferry that required daylight and good weather to operate. The bridge replaced the ferry in December 2015, providing a crossing for pedestrians and up to approximately 1,000 vehicles a day.

== Design ==
Multiple explanations have been provided for the bridge's unique circular design, wherein oppositely-bound two-lane traffic is split into separate lanes near the start of the bridge, and reforms near the end. Principally, it is reported that the bridge was designed in such a way in order to slow traffic and allow drivers and pedestrians to "appreciate panoramic views to one of the most beautiful and pristine coastal landscapes in Uruguay." Pedestrian crosswalks allow pedestrian access to sidewalks on both the inner and outer edge of the circle.

Rafael Viñoly Architects also cites environmentalism as a factor in the bridge's design, as splitting the bridge into separate, narrower lanes reduces the total amount of time in which the bridge casts a shadow on any one part of the water's surface, "which improves light penetration and dispersal across the water column."

It is also likely that the bridge's unique design came about partially as a sort of publicity stunt, in order to draw attention and potential tourism to the bridge's surrounding regions, potentially in an effort to bring about further development of the Rocha Coastline particularly. Argentinian real estate developer Eduardo Costantini, who contributed the large majority of the project's funding, is quoted as follows:

It is an iconic architectural piece that will be a catalytic factor in driving the development of Rocha's coastline, Just 35% of the stretch between the two lagoons can be developed and 50% must be devoted to green areas.

== Construction ==
Construction for the Laguna Garzón Bridge began in September 2014 and ended in December 2015. It cost $11 million to build, $10 million of which was provided by Argentinian real estate developer, Eduardo Costantini. To build the bridge, 450 tons of steel, 500 cubic metres of concrete, and 40,000 metres of cables were used. Rafael Viñoly Architects accepted the commission for the bridge on the condition that development rights of Uruguay National Route 10 be de-federalized and made the responsibility of local jurisdictions, believed by Rafael Viñoly Architects to be more environmentally conscious.

== Gallery ==
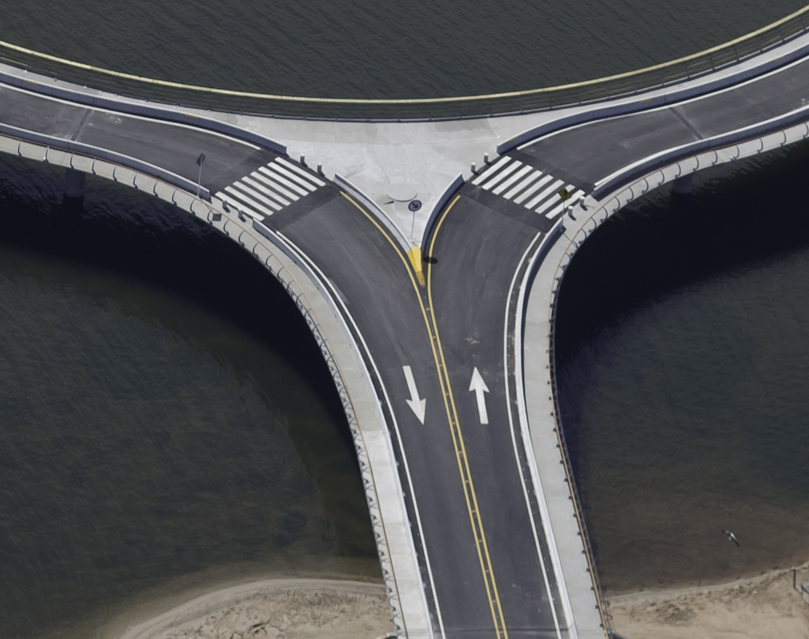
Detail of pedestrian crossings to sidewalks on the outer and inner circle

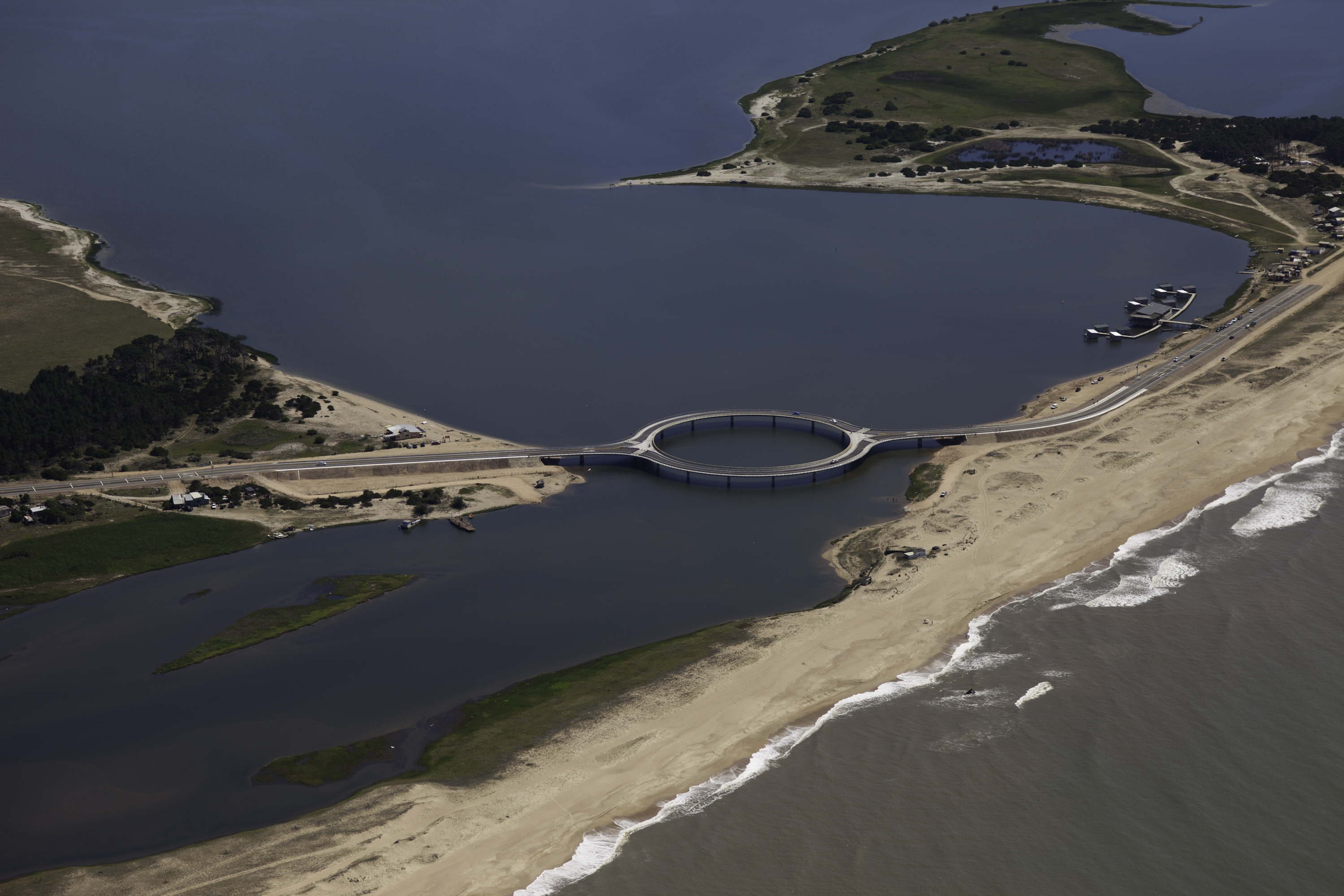
Positioning of bridge and approaches within the Laguna Garzón

== See also ==
- Circular Pedestrian Bridge
- Circle Bridge
