= Cabo Polonio Lighthouse =

Lighthouse in Uruguay

Cabo Polonio lighthouse Faro de Cabo Polonio
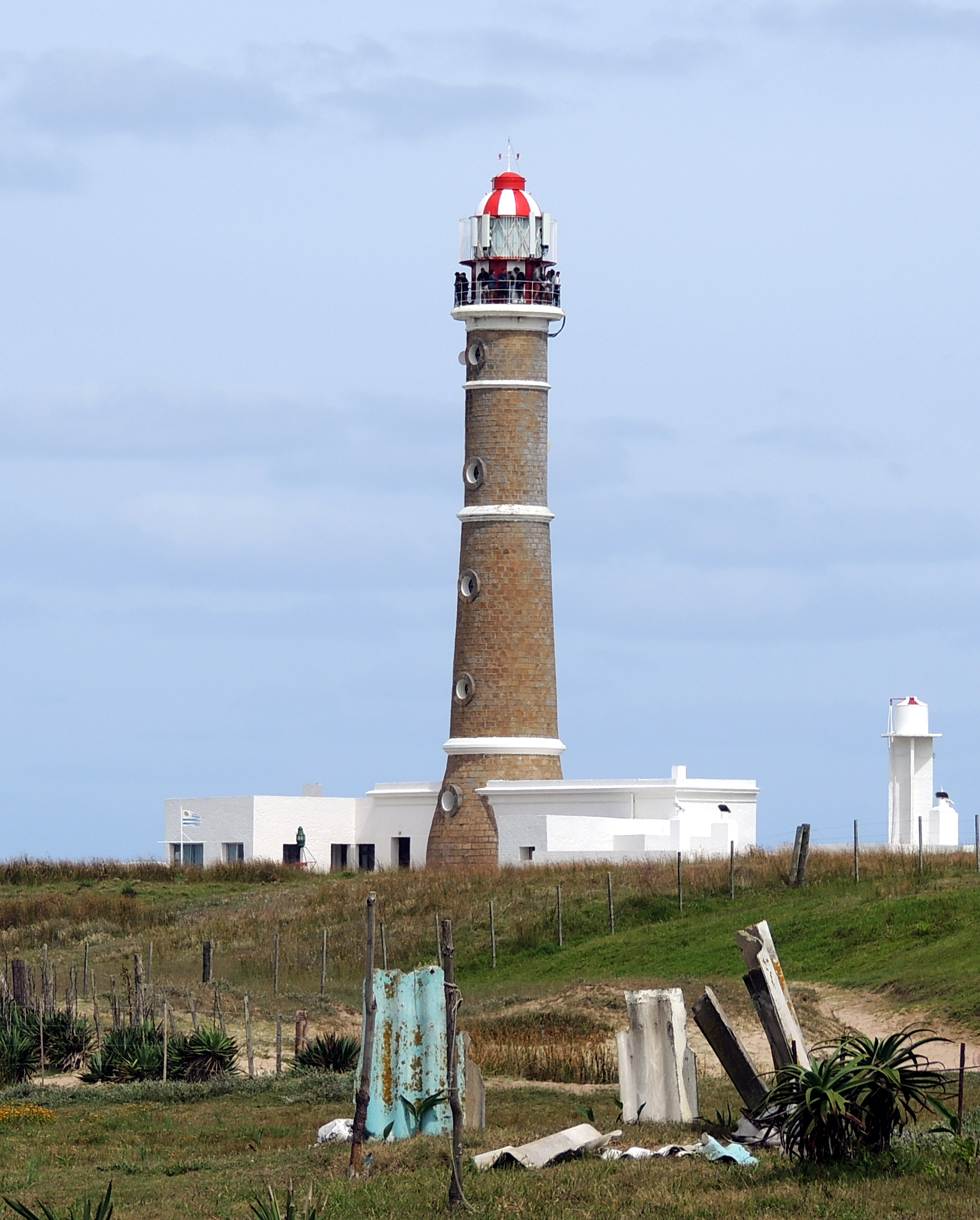
- Cabo Polonio lighthouse in 2019.
- Location: Cabo Polonio; Rocha Department; Uruguay
- Coordinates: 34°24′19.3″S 53°46′40.2″W

Tower
- Constructed: 1881
- Construction: brick
- Automated: 1961
- Height: 25.9 metres (85 ft)
- Operator: National Navy of Uruguay
- Heritage: Cultural Heritage Monument

Light
- Focal height: 39.9 metres (131 ft)
- Range: 17.8 nmi (33.0 km; 20.5 mi)
- Characteristic: Fl W 12s

Cabo Polonio Lighthouse (Spanish: Faro de Cabo Polonio) is a lighthouse located in the headland of Cabo Polonio, Rocha Department, Uruguay, overlooking the Atlantic Ocean. It was erected in 1881.

== See also ==
- List of lighthouses in Uruguay
