= Water resources management in Uruguay =

- Withdrawals by sector 2004: Domestic: 11%; Agriculture: 87%; Industry: 2%
- Renewable water resources: 139 km^{3}
- Surface water produced internally: 59 km^{3}
- Groundwater recharge: 23 km^{3}
- Overlap shared by surface water and groundwater: 23 km^{3}
- External renewable water resources: 74 km^{3}
- Renewable water resources per capita: 41,065 m^{3} per year
- Wetland designated as Ramsar sites: 424,904 ha
- Hydropower generation: 51%

The water resources management system in Uruguay has been influenced by the general sense of water as an abundant resource in the country. Average annual rainfall is 1,182 mm, representing a contribution of 210 km^{3} annually throughout its territory. In 2002, the per capita renewable water resources was 41,065 cubic meters, way above the world average 8,467 m^{3} in 2006. Uruguay also shares one of the largest groundwater reserves in the world, the Guarani Aquifer, with Brazil, Argentina, Paraguay. The Guarani aquifer covers 1,200,000 square kilometers and has a storage capacity of 40,000 km^{3}.

The institutional framework for water resources management consists of sectoral governmental agencies at the national and regional level. The Water Code, Decree No 14.859 of 1978, establishes the legal framework for water resources management in Uruguay completed by sectoral laws for agriculture, industrial water use, energy production and water supply and sanitation.

== Water resources base ==
=== Surface and groundwater resources ===
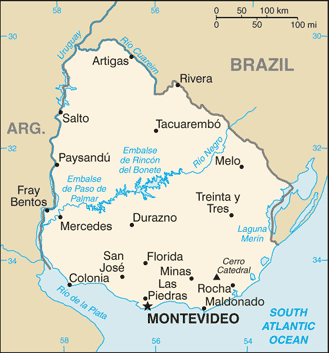
Map of Uruguay

Uruguay has six major watersheds, Uruguay River, Plata River, Atlantic, Merin Lake, Negro River and Santa Lucía River. All watersheds in Uruguay but Santa Lucia share water with other countries such as Brazil and Argentina. Surface water is the main supplier of water for irrigation (87%), domestic (11%) and industrial use (2%). Irrigation is the main water user by watershed, except in the Santa Lucia River (domestic use) and the Plata River (industrial use).

Groundwater resources supply water to some small urban settlements and small and medium scale irrigation systems in the interior. The most important groundwater reserves in Paraguay in terms of capacity are the Guaraní and the Raigon Aquifer. The Guarani aquifer is one of the largest groundwater reserves in the world, covering 1,200,000 km^{2} throughout Brazil, Argentina, Paraguay and Uruguay. The Guarani Aquifer has a storage capacity of 40,000 cubic kilometers. With an estimated annual recharge rate of 160–250 km^{3} and more than 40 km^{3} available for consumption, the Guaraní aquifer could supply daily 300 liters of water per capita to 360 million people. The neighbor countries are implementing an Environmental Protection and Sustainable Management project together with the Organization of American States and the World Bank.

River basins in Uruguay
Basin	Surface area (km^{2})
Uruguay River	45,750
Plata River	12,400
Atlantic	8,600
Merin Lake	28,700
Negro River	68,350
Santa Lucía River	13,250

Source: Ministerio de Vivienda, Ordenamiento Territorial y Medio Ambiente

=== Storage capacity ===
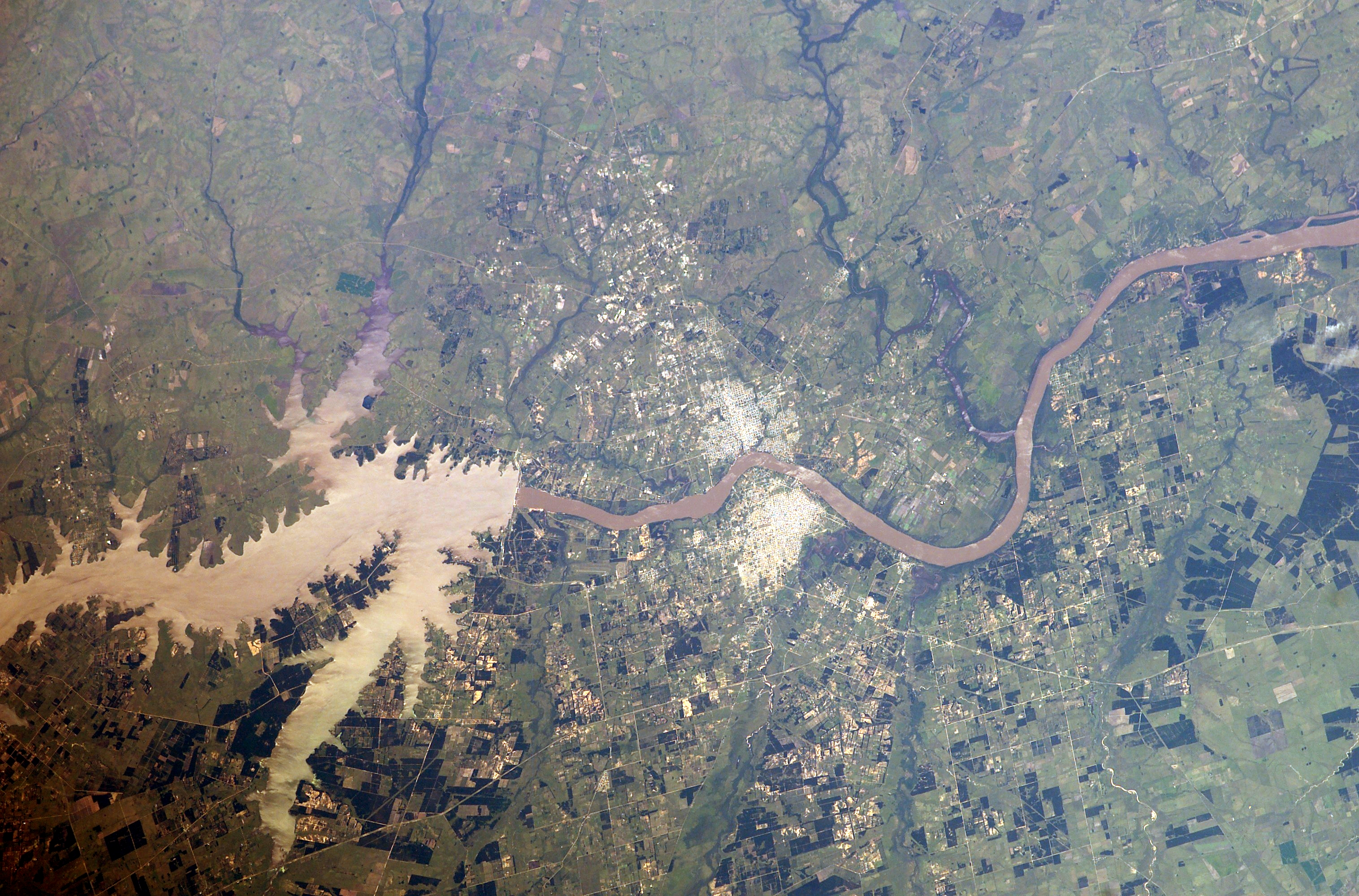
Satellite view of the Salto Grande Dam, Uruguay River.

According to the Food and Agriculture Organization, the Uruguay River and the Negro River have the largest concentration of Uruguay's big dams, aimed mostly at hydropower generation, with a total storage capacity of 17.3 km^{3}. Large dams in Uruguay include:

- the Salto Grande dam on the Uruguay River on the border with Argentina, inaugurated in 1979, with a 1,890 MW power plant and a storage capacity of 5 km^{3}
- the Rincón del Bonete dam on the Negro River, inaugurated in 1945, with a 160 MW power plant and the largest reservoir in the country with a storage capacity of 8.8 km^{3}
- the Baygorria dam on the Negro River, inaugurated in 1960, with a 108 MW power plant and a storage capacity of 0.6 km^{3}
- the Palmar dam on the Negro River, inaugurated in 1980, with a 333 MW power plant and a storage capacity of 2.85 km^{3}

Other medium dams for industrial and irrigation purposes are located in the Santa Lucia River (Canelón Grande Dam), Rocha Department (India Muerta Dam) and Minas de Corrales. In addition, there are many small private minor reservoirs throughout the country aimed mostly at irrigation with an estimated storage capacity of 1.4 km^{3}.

=== Water quality ===
The Ministry of Housing, Territorial Organization and Environmental (MVOTMA for its acronym in Spanish) considers that water quality in Uruguay is slowly decreasing due to the release of untreated effluents from industries and cities as well as agricultural runoff. In addition, uncontrolled groundwater use can lead to pollution or overexploitation of aquifers. In the Departments of Canelones and Maldonado, overexploitation has cause sea water intrusion into coastal aquifers and bacterial contamination.

== Water resources management by sector ==
=== Drinking water and sanitation ===
Uruguay is the only country in Latin America that has achieved quasi universal coverage of access to safe drinking water supply and adequate sanitation. Water service quality is considered good, with practically all localities in Uruguay receiving disinfected water on a continuous basis. 70% of wastewater collected by the national utility was treated. Given these achievements, the government's priority is to improve the efficiency of services and to expand access to sewerage, where appropriate, in areas where on-site sanitation is used.

Water and sanitation coverage in Uruguay (2004)

		Urban (93% of the population)	Rural (7% of the population)	Total
Water	Broad definition	100%	100%	100%
Water	House connections	97%	84%	96%
Sanitation	Broad definition	100%	99%	100%
Sanitation	Sewerage	81%	42%	78%

Source: WHO/UNICEF Joint Monitoring Programme (JMP /2006). Data for water and sanitation based on the WHO World Health Survey (2003).

=== Irrigation and drainage ===
Uruguay has approximately 181,000 hectares (ha) equipped for irrigation or about 12.8% of the total agricultural land, 1,412,000ha. The private sector has been the main investor of irrigation infrastructure in Uruguay. The public sector has contributed in some irrigation projects such as Canelón Grande (1 100 ha), Colonia España (815 ha), Chingolo, Tomás Berreta (360 ha), Corrales (3 500 ha), Aguas Blancas (125 ha), and India Muerta. Since 1996, the Natural Resources Management and Irrigation Development Project (PRENADER for its acronym in Spanish) has promoted irrigation techniques and built several hydraulic infrastructures such as small dams and groundwater pumping systems aimed at supplying water for irrigation.

=== Hydropower ===
The electricity sector in Uruguay has a strong participation of the public sector. According to 2002 data, energy supply is dominated by hydropower generation (51%), followed by crude oil (34%), wood (11%), biomass (3%) and natural gas (1%). Three hydropower plants on the Negro River and one binational plant with Argentina on the Uruguay River generate most of the hydropower in Uruguay (see above under water storage for a list of the dams). The possibility of building new plants is constrained by Uruguay's geographic characteristics.

=== Aquatic ecosystems ===
Aquatic ecosystems, especially fisheries, contribute to Uruguayan economic growth. In 2003, fisheries accounted for 0,3% of GDP, 4.6% of total exports –or US$100 million – and employed directly 2,000 and indirectly over 11,000 workers. Most of Uruguayan captures come from the Plata River and the Atlantic Ocean. According to MVOTMA, most of fish species captured for exports are close to maximum sustainable catch. The neighbor countries are implementing an Environmental Protection and Sustainable Management project together with the Organization of American States and the World Bank. (See video)

== Legal and institutional framework ==
=== Legal framework ===
The Water Code, Decree No 14.859 of 1978, establishes the legal framework for water resources management in Uruguay. The Water Code grants sole ownership and managerial responsibilities of superficial and groundwater resources to national and municipal government, including the establishment of water user fees. The Water Code however maintains water property rights to private owners issued prior to the enactment of the Water Code, if registered appropriately. Uruguayan government grants water use rights through concessions and permits based on quantity, end purpose, and general interest related to water use.

The Water Code is not an integral piece of legislation. Sectoral laws establish specific provisions for agriculture, industrial, energy production and water supply and sanitation completing the legal framework for water resources management in Uruguay.

=== Institutional framework ===
The National Water Authority in Uruguay is the executive branch of the Uruguayan Government together with the Public Works and Transport Ministry (MTOP for its acronym in Spanish) and the MVOTMA. The executive branch of the Uruguayan government is responsible for designing and implementing the water resources management national policy, granting water user rights, establishing priorities for water use by regions or watersheds giving priority to drinking water, establishing water user fees, and developing the Water Code through regulation. According to the Water Code, the State shall promote the study, preservation and integrated sustainable use of water.

The MTOP, through its National Hydrographic Directorate, is responsible for the operation of the water network, execution of hydraulic works, and management of irrigation systems. The MTOP, through its Hydraulic Division, also engages in the processing of licenses and concessions, and the operation of the National Hydrological Data Bank

The MVOTMA, through its National Environmental Directorate (DINAMA for its acronym in Spanish), is responsible for monitoring water quality as well as protecting water resources against environmental degradation. The MVOTMA is also in charge of supervising infrastructural development vis a vis Uruguayan environmental safeguards as well as granting pollution rights.

The National Directorate for Mining Activities and Geology conducts feasibility studies for groundwater exploration and measures groundwater quantity and quality. The Soil and Water Division of the National Directorate for Natural Renewable Resources is responsible for water and soil management for irrigated agriculture though water quality monitoring and erosion and land degradation control. Finally, the National Water and Sanitation Company (OSE for its acronym in Spanish) is in charge of water supply and sanitation in all Uruguay except in the department of Montevideo which is the Mayor's responsibility.

=== Government strategy ===
In 1978, the Water Code made the Uruguayan Government responsible for designing and implementing a national water resources policy. However, in 2008 the government is still debating together with public and private stakeholders over the specifics of the National Policy. According to the La Republica University, “despite the existence of a regulatory body like the Water Code, regulations and programs, there is not a defined organizational context or lines of action established by a national water Policy.”

== Economic aspects ==
=== Water pricing ===
The Water Code of 1978 incorporated the concept of a water fee for the use of public water (art. 3). Later irrigation legislation reiterated the principle of paying for water in Uruguay. However, the Uruguayan Government has not yet established a methodology to determine fees for different users, so that water abstraction from the environment remains free. Recognizing water as an economic good is considered a good practice internationally and is part of the Dublin Statement for Integrated Water Resources Management.

=== External cooperation ===
The World Bank has contributed with Uruguay government in several projects related to water resources management. In the context of the Natural Resources Management and Irrigation Development Project a soil and water management strategy was formulated and implemented to increase, diversify and maintain agricultural production and exports of individual farmers. As a result of the project, over 2,400 farmers made investments to increase by almost 20% the irrigated areas in the country (from 35,000 hectares to a total of 190,000 hectares), where land devoted to irrigated rice crops accounted for almost 77% of the total. Despite the fact that irrigated rice fields still maintain a relatively high importance, the Project decisively supported diversification. The expansion of irrigated rice fields (19,000 hectares) financed by the project was almost fully related to the expansion of cattle breeding systems, a process by which the irrigated rice and forage crops were integrated to the use of the soil in rotation with pastures. In addition, the expansion of irrigated areas for the production of fruits and vegetables supported by the project (16,000 hectares) represented an increase of over 100% regarding the initial area where these products were grown which contributed to a considerable growth in the production of high-value crops and non-traditional exports.

Also, the first phase of the National Water and Sanitation Company (OSE) modernization and systems rehabilitation project was supported by a 27 million US dollars loan approved in June 2000. OSE was able to successfully implement and disseminate an in-house reference system that compares performance of the water utility in 21 cities, on the basis of eight service quality indicators. In addition, the first phase helped improve sewer coverage in another 12 cities of the interior by expanding—according to demand—the sewerage systems. Finally, three new sewage treatment plants were built in the cities of Minas, Treinta y Tres and Durazno, with a total capacity to serve 60,000 users.

The Inter-American Development Bank has recently approved a consultancy service to design a mixed public company to provide stormwater drainage services for Ciudad de la Costa. The IDB was a strong supporter of several water supply and sanitation projects during the 1990s. Some of these efforts included the creation of a National Sanitation Program, an Urban Recovery Program, and Sanitation to Montevideo and Metropolitan Areas.

== The pulp mill conflict with Argentina ==
The pulp mill conflict between Argentina and Uruguay is an ongoing conflict between private citizens, organizations, and the governments of these two South American countries about the construction of two pulp mills on the Uruguay River. The Argentinian side of the conflict is concerned about the environmental and social impacts of pulp byproducts as well as the lack of prior consultation of the Uruguayan Gonverment according to the international water sharing treaty signed by both countries. Uruguay, on the other hand, claims that Argentina was informed of the projects, yet the treaty does not require Argentinian's approval to be implemented and that the technology used in the mills would avoid polluting the river.

As a diplomatic, economic, and public relations conflict between both parties, the dispute has also affected tourism and transportation as well as the otherwise amicable relations between the two countries. The feud is unprecedented between the two countries, which have shared historical and cultural ties.

== Potential climate change impacts ==
The Uruguayan Second Communication to the UNFCCC includes and assessment of the vulnerability of water resources to the likely impacts of Climate Change. The assessment, which is also part of the National Program for Mitigation and Adaptation to Climate Change (PMEGEMA for its acronym in Spanish), states that river basins with high water resources demand and limited hydraulic infrastructure will likely be the systems affected the most by Climate Change. These impacts will be worsened by the lack of an efficient, integrated water resources management system country wide. Also, according to the Second Communication climate scenarios show that "there will be likely an increased demand of water vis a vis supply, but this ratio is far from compromising Uruguay’s water resources, except from the Merin Lagoon basin, where current water balance is already stressed."

Floods magnitude and frequency is likely to increase due to intense precipitation and land use change, especially around urban areas. Groundwater recharge will also be affected by change on precipitation, although it is not expected to be substantially lower. However, MVOTMA expects an increase in groundwater use in the future due to an increased water demand for irrigation and industrial purposes. Higher demand could increase pressure in already stressed systems such as the Raigon Aquifer and Southern areas where there is a need for groundwater integrated management systems.

== See also ==
- Water supply and sanitation in Uruguay
