= Isla del Padre =

Island in Uruguay

Coordinates: 33°10′58″S 53°41′42″W

Isla del Padre (English: Father's Island) is a river island located in the Cebollatí River, Rocha Department, Uruguay, not far from the Merín Lagoon.

It is nicknamed "the Uruguayan Amazonia" due to its rich biodiversity. More than 170 plant species, 15 mammal species, 320 bird species, 17 reptile species, 16 amphibian species, 67 fish species, and 115 spider species have been recorded.

In 1986 it was declared a Ramsar site. Since 2021 it is part of the National System of Protected Areas in Uruguay. It was also declared a Departmental Reserve.
