= Bioma Pampa-Quebradas del Norte =

- Reserva de Biosfera Bioma Pampa
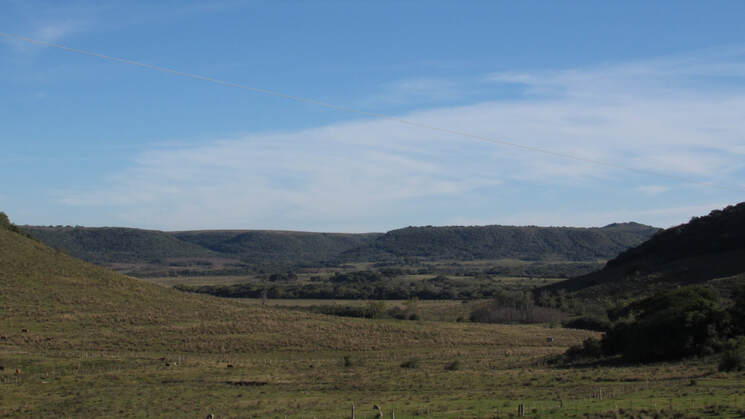

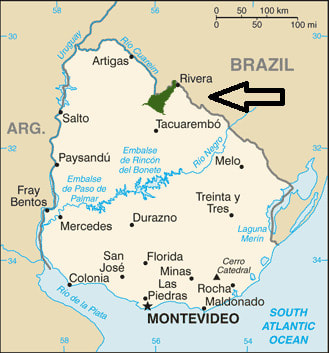
- Location of Bioma Pampa Biosphere Reserve in Uruguay
- Location: Rivera Department, Uruguay
- Area: 1,108.82 km^{2} (428.12 sq mi)
- Designation: UNESCO-MAB Biosphere Reserve
- Designated: 2014

The Bioma Pampa Quebradas del Norte is a protected ecological area in Uruguay, protected by UNESCO since 2 June 2014. This biological reserve consists out of a landscape with native grasses, streams and subtropical rainforests. The biosphere reserve has a surface area of 110,882 hectares, consisting of a mosaic of ecosystems.

== Flora and fauna ==
The reserve serves as a corridor for the entry of species of subtropical origin to the Uruguayan territory. Inside of the reserve there are many rare species of reptiles and amphibians. The area consists of unique features of the landscape with different species of plants and animals. Within the reserve are creeks with a structure of jungle-like subtropical forest. In addition there are wide grasslands and large forests. The biome pampa is characterized by many of species of grasses, and contributes to thenesting of many species of birds.

=== Flora ===
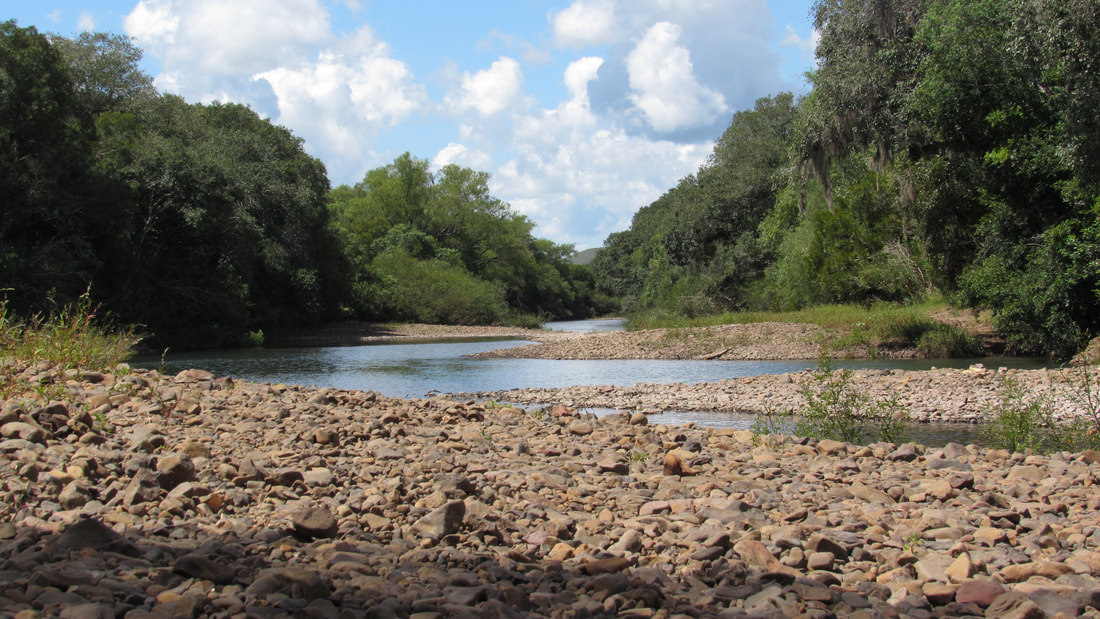

The predominant vegetation in the area corresponds to the grassland in winter and scrub shrub. Trees and shrubs predominate on the slopes, being able to vary the composition of species in the different positions of the same. In addition, there is a pronounced forestry.

=== Animal biodiversity ===
There can be found a diversity of different species in the biosfere reserve. The list of priority species is based on the list identified for the Protected Landscape Valle del Lunarejo, in which are properly represented all the species of the reserve. The most important records from the list are:

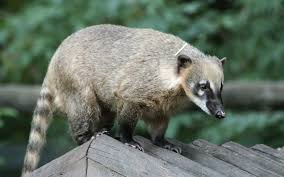

22 species of amphibians (nearly 50% registered at a national level), 41 species of reptiles (62% registered at a national level), 173 species of birds (40% recorded at national level) and 31 species of mammals (27% registered at the national level). A large part of the species registered in Uruguay can also be found in the reserve. Apart from this a part of the species in the reserve are recorded as a priority species for conservation. For example, the coati, the giant armadillo cerreta and the rattlesnake of South America. In addition to the wild animals, there are many sheep, cattle horses and other farm animals.

== The main functions ==
The three main functions of the biosphere reserve are

1. conservation of ecosystems, species and landscape
2. sustainable development from a socio-cultural and ecological point of view
3. logistical support to projects in education, awareness, research and training on the environment

=== Conservation ===
Temperate grassland has the greatest problems of conservation and to a lesser degree of protection on a global scale. So the conservation of this type in the reserve not only plays an important role in the conservation of regional but also at a global level. Especially the protected landscape Valle del Lunarejo which is a national park since 2009 within the reserve is important for the Uruguayan nature.

=== Sustainable development ===
The biosphere reserve has a great potential of economic development, based on the vision of responsible use and sustainable of resources existing in the territory. In this sense, already been implementing a series of projects within the area with the aim of developing the potential of income generation to the local population. These include a strong emphasis on the participation of women in the economic development of the rural family. These projects have succeeded in revitalizing the use of local resources such as wool, honey, native bush, orchards and ecotourism.

The socio-cultural development of the Reserves is driven by the local gaucho traditions; all of this movement isassociated with tourism and the revitalization of typical festivals where it promotes the enhancement of the status and image of Rio Grande do Sul.

Farming and forestry will likely continue to be those that represent the main income in the region. The development of techniques for sustainable use of natural pastures and the breeding of sheep and cattle in the same serve as a model for the conservation of the characteristics of the biome pampa. The forestry is mainly carried out with various species of eucalyptus. They have also encouraged and very important to the development of beekeeping, being today the department of Rivera, the main producer of honey of Uruguay. The existence of a large area of natural bush, mountain streams and riverside mountains, to the obtaining of firewood without the proper care of the process of exploitation.

=== logistical support ===
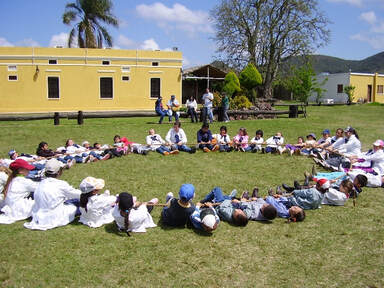

This function supports projects in education, tourism, awareness-raising and training on the environment, as well as also research for the conservation and sustainable development

There are environmental education programs that are provided for the completion of talks with schools and locals within the area and to support the teachers in the subject of the reserves and of the environment.

The research and surveillance programmes of the last 15 years are focused in the core area and are of different kinds: biological, social, and economic. These processes of research are to generate greater knowledge about the environment as well as those related to the conservation of these resources.

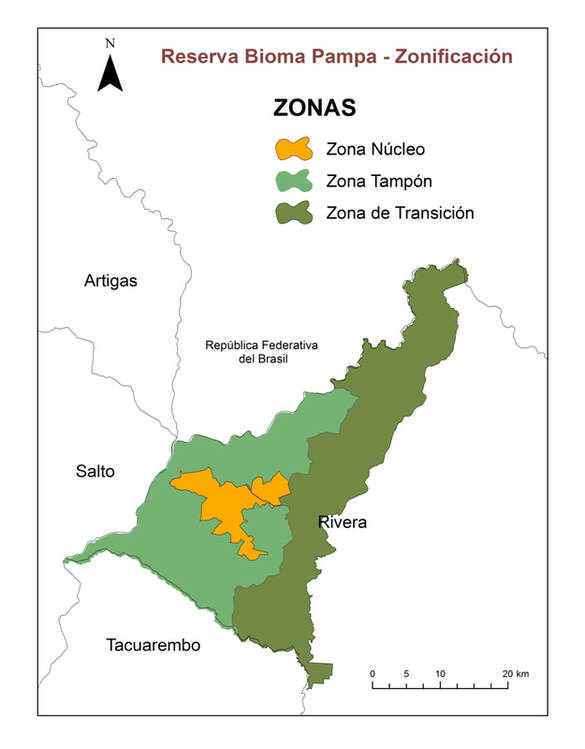

The revitalization of green areas, public and close to the city of Rivera, such as the Park, Great Britain, and Saw Sauzal also contribute to the environmental education of citizens.
