= Cerritos de Indios =

Archaeological sites in Uruguay and Brazil

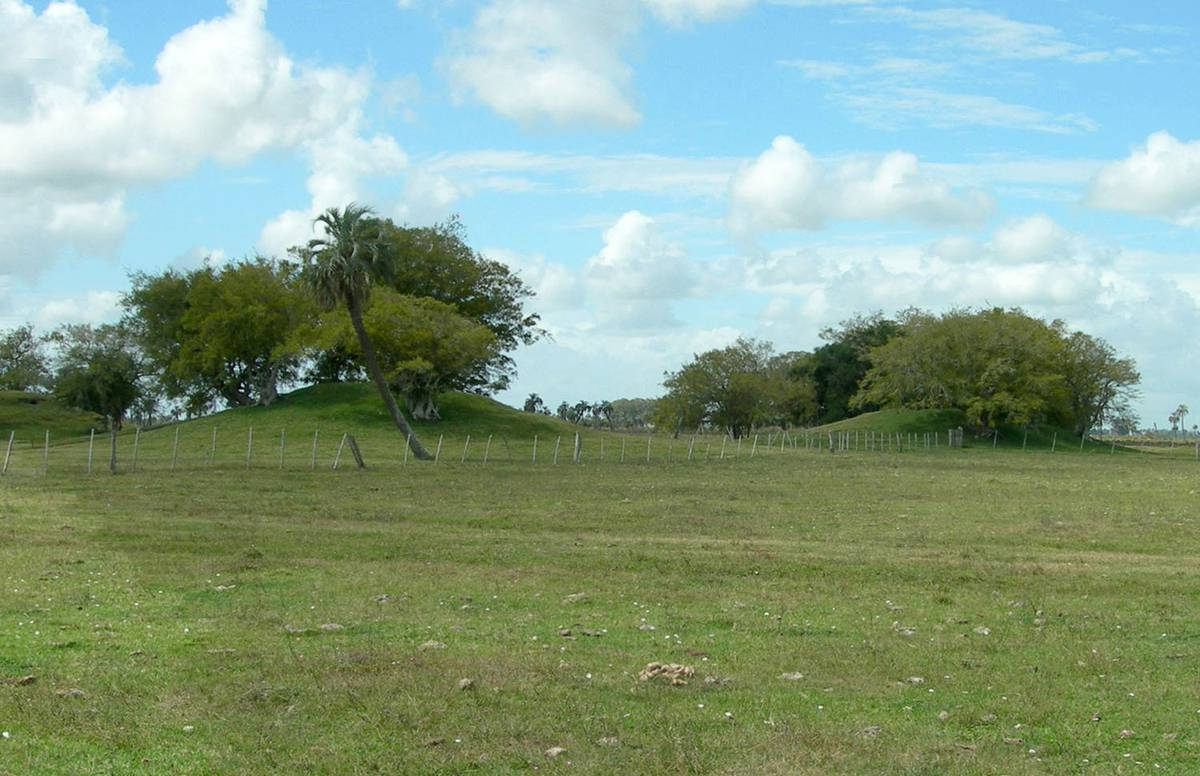
Cerritos in Rocha, Uruguay.

The Cerritos de Indios (Spanish for 'Indian Mounds' or 'Indian Little Hills') are a collection of more than 3000 tumuli or earth mounds found mainly in the eastern region of Uruguay and in the southernmost tip of Brazil.

Of different sizes and shapes, some of them date back 4000-5000 years. The identity of the people group responsible for their construction is not known, as the mounds were built long before the arrival of the first European explorers, and the builders left no written records.

In 2008 they were declared a National Historic Monument by the Uruguayan government.

Archeological investigations have found ancient human remains buried alongside domestic dogs, pots, stone tools, corn seeds, pumpkins and beans, giving for the first time evidence of agricultural practices by the indigenous peoples of the region who were thought to not have discovered agriculture until the arrival of Europeans.
