= Potrerillo =

Coordinates: 32°40′S 65°39′W

- Municipality and village
- Interactive map of Potrerillo
- Country: Argentina
- Province: San Luis Province
- Time zone: UTC−3 (ART)

Potrerillo is a village and municipality in San Luis Province in central Argentina.
