= Guarani Aquifer =

Second largest aquifer system

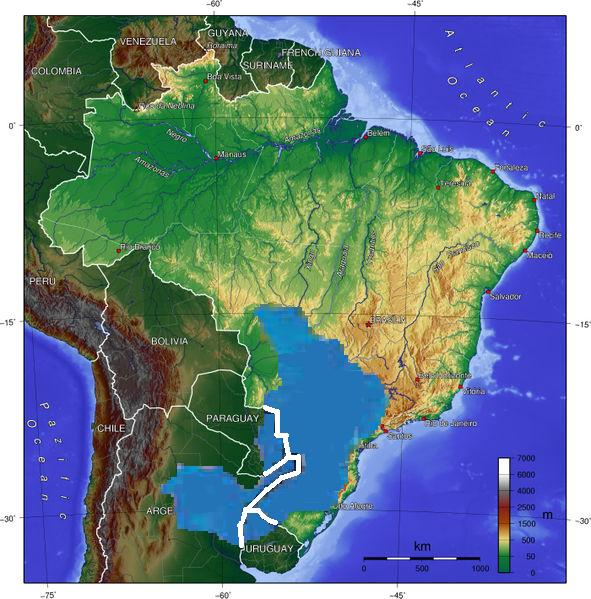
The Guarani Aquifer

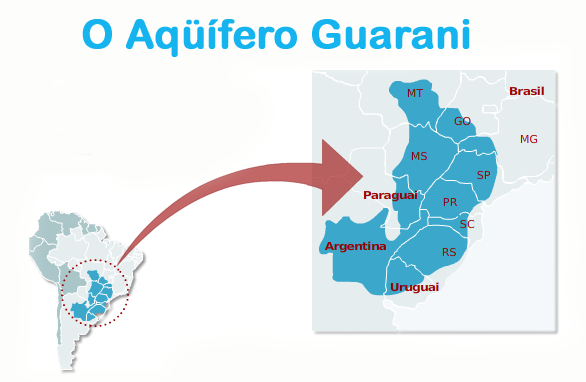
Map of the aquifer overlaid with political boundaries.

The Guarani Aquifer, is the second largest known aquifer system in the world and is an important source of fresh water.

Located beneath the parts of Argentina, Brazil, Paraguay, and Uruguay, it covers 1,200,000 km^{2} (460,000 sq mi), with a volume of about 40,000 km^{3} (9,600 cu mi), a thickness of between 50 m (160 ft) and 800 m (2,600 ft) and a maximum depth of about 1,800 m (5,900 ft). It is estimated to contain about 37,000 km^{3} (8,900 cu mi) of water, with a total recharge rate of about 166 km^{3}/year from precipitation.

It was named by Uruguayan geologist Danilo Antón after the Guarani people, an indigenous group that inhabited roughly the same area.

== Geology of the aquifer ==
The Guarani Aquifer consists primarily of fluvial sandstones of the Piramboia Formation and aeolian sandstones of the Botucatu Formation, which were deposited during the Triassic and Jurassic periods. Over 90% of the total area is overlain by early Cretaceous basalts of the Serra Geral Formation. The basalt's low permeability allows it to act as an aquitard, providing a high degree of containment. This greatly reduces the rate of infiltration and subsequent recharge, but also isolates the aquifer from the vadose zone, subsequent surface-associated losses due to evaporation and evapotranspiration, and potential contamination.

The erosion exposes pieces of sandstone on aquifer's banks, which are called outcrops. This is where the rain comes in and also where the contamination might happen. In general, the aquifer comprises a variety of quartz sand, well-rounded format, and has low clay content. Granulometric data indicate that over 50% of the grains have a diameter between 0.125 and 0.250 millimetres (125 and 250 μm; 4.9 and 9.8 thou).

== Recharge of the aquifer ==
The recharge distribution is related to precipitation rate. Its complexity is due to the indirect relation between them. The infiltration rate depends on parameters that are variables in time and space. Another important factor that contributes to the aquifer's recharge is the importance of evapotranspiration. The soil, plants and atmosphere could be considered as components of a system physically related and dynamic. In some regions, the quantity of water that evaporates is larger than the runoff flow.

A study by Brazilian Agricultural Research Corporation (Embrapa) in Ribeirão Preto - Brazil, from 1994 to 2001 indicates that agricultural activity using chemical products offers risk of contamination for the groundwater.

Vegetal interception is another factor that directly influences the quantity of water that infiltrates into the soil, according to Soares and Almeida (2001) who realized a study in the Eucalyptus area between October 1995 and September 1996. The interception during this period was evaluated in 11% of the precipitation value.

== See also ==
- Aquifer
- Fossil water
- Groundwater
- Ogallala Aquifer
