= Laguna Garzón =

Lagoon on the Atlantic seashore in Uruguay

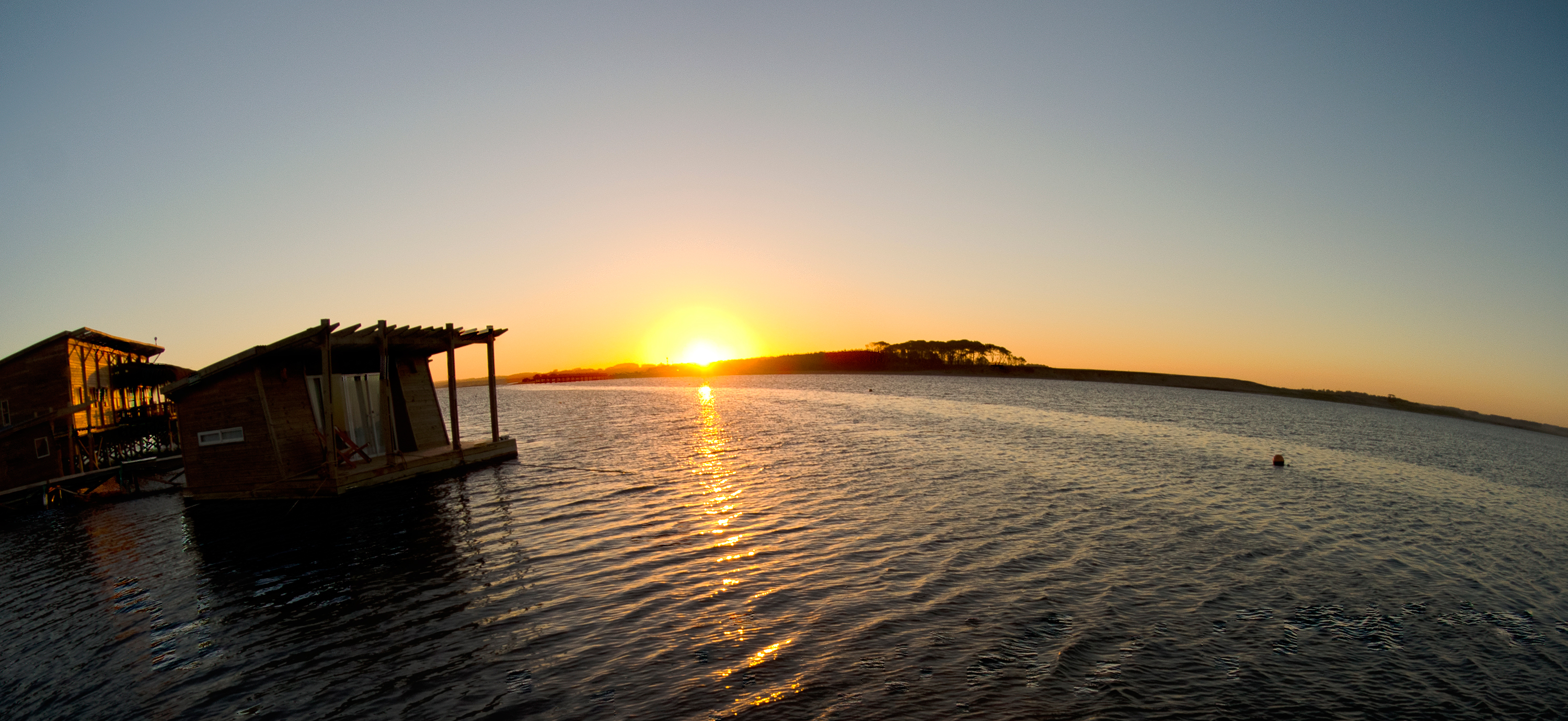
- Sunset on Laguna Garzón

- Location within Uruguay Location within South America
- Location: Maldonado Department; Rocha Department, Uruguay
- Coordinates: 34°46′00″S 54°33′00″W
- Surface area: 18 square kilometres (6.9 sq mi)

Laguna José Ignacio (José Ignacio Lagoon) is a body of water located between Maldonado Department and Rocha Department, Uruguay. A sandbank separates it from the Atlantic Ocean. The nearest famous seaside resort is José Ignacio.

== History ==
This coastal lagoon was previously served by a small 2-vehicle ferry that required daylight and good weather to operate; in December 2015, the unique circular Laguna Garzón Bridge on Route 10 was opened to vehicular traffic, providing a crossing for pedestrians and up to approximately 1,000 vehicles a day.

== Environment ==
The lagoon has been designated part of the National System of Protected Areas in Uruguay. It is a birdwatching site. It has been designated an Important Bird Area (IBA) by BirdLife International because it supports a significant population of wintering buff-breasted sandpipers.
