= Laguna de Rocha =

Lagoon on the Atlantic shore of Uruguay

- Location within Uruguay Location within South America
- Location: Rocha Department, Uruguay
- Coordinates: 34°37′S 54°17′W
Designations
Ramsar Wetland
- Official name: Laguna de Rocha
- Designated: 5 June 2015
- Reference no.: 2236

Laguna de Rocha (Rocha Lagoon) is a body of water located in Rocha Department, Uruguay.

== History ==
On 31 October 1945, a Latecoere 631 (F-BANT) of Air France made an emergency landing in Laguna de Rocha after the no. 3 engine propeller separated and sliced a three-metre hole into the fuselage, killing two passengers and starting a small fire. The plane was later repaired.

== Environment ==
The lagoon and its surroundings were declared a protected area in 1977. It has been designated an Important Bird Area (IBA) by BirdLife International because it supports significant populations of coscoroba and black-necked swans, Chilean flamingos, buff-breasted sandpipers, straight-billed reedhaunters and black-and-white monjitas.

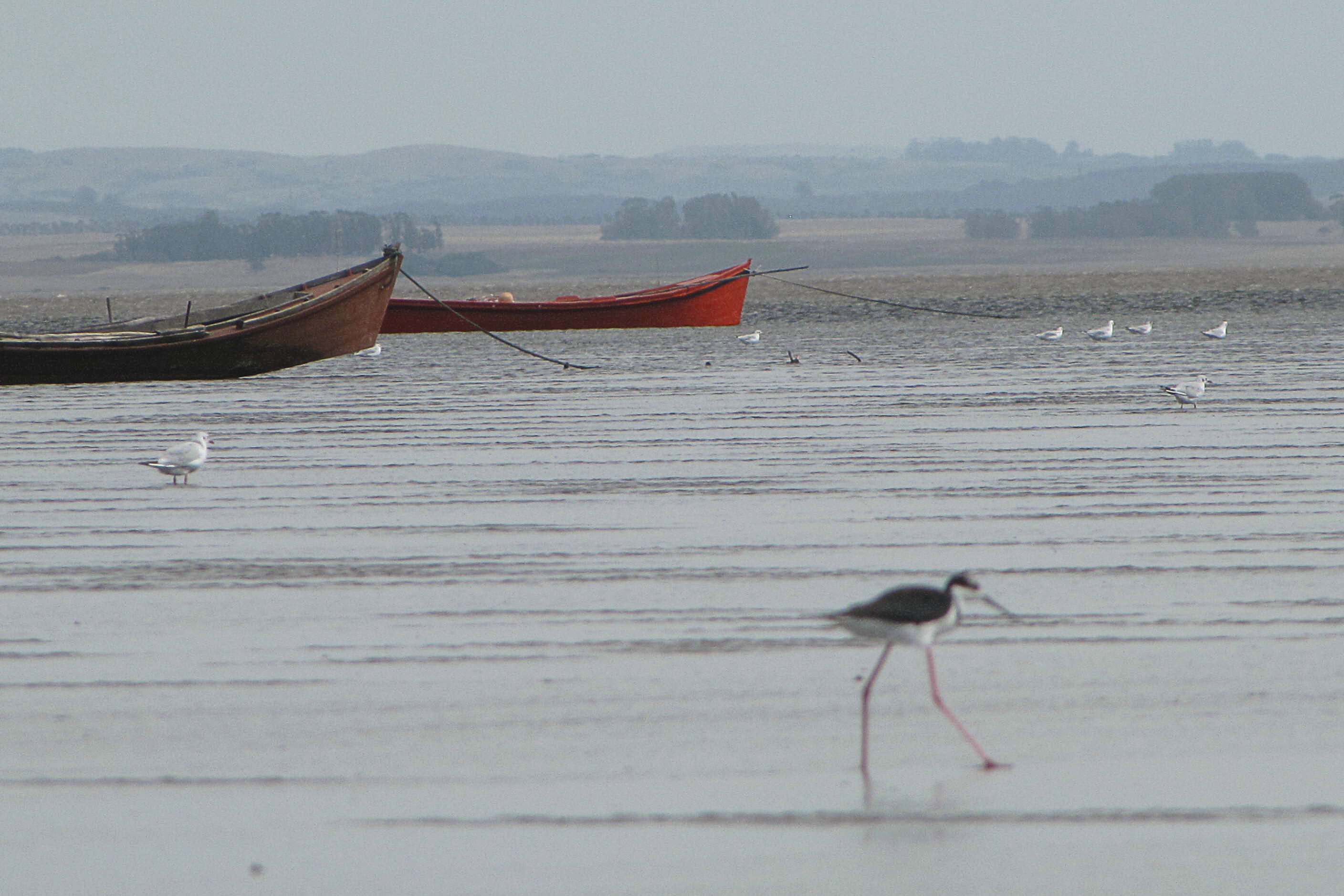
A white-backed stilt at Laguna de Rocha
