= Laguna de Castillos =

- Location within Uruguay
- Location: Rocha Department of Uruguay
- Coordinates: 34°19′02″S 53°55′46″W
- Type: lagoon
- Primary inflows: Arroyo Castillos
- Primary outflows: Arroyo Valizas
- Catchment area: 925 square kilometres (357 sq mi)
- Surface area: 80 square kilometres (31 sq mi)
- Max. depth: 5 metres (16 ft)

Laguna de Castillos is an important water body in the Rocha Department of Uruguay. It is located 15 kilometres (9.3 mi) south of Castillos and 50 kilometres (31 mi) northeast of Rocha. It is considered an important wildlife refuge and bird sanctuary.
