= Laguna Negra, Uruguay =

Lagoon on the Atlantic seashore in Uruguay

Laguna Negra
- Location within Uruguay Location within South America
- Location: Rocha Department, Uruguay
- Coordinates: 34°01′31.7″S 53°40′40.2″W
- Surface area: 187 square kilometres (72 sq mi)

Laguna Negra (Black Lagoon), also known as Laguna de los Difuntos (Lagoon of the Deceased), is an important body of water located in Rocha Department, Uruguay.
