= Religion in Uruguay =

Religion in Uruguay (2018)
1. Roman Catholic (44.8%)
2. Other Christian (9.50%)
3. No religion (44.5%)
4. Other (1.20%)

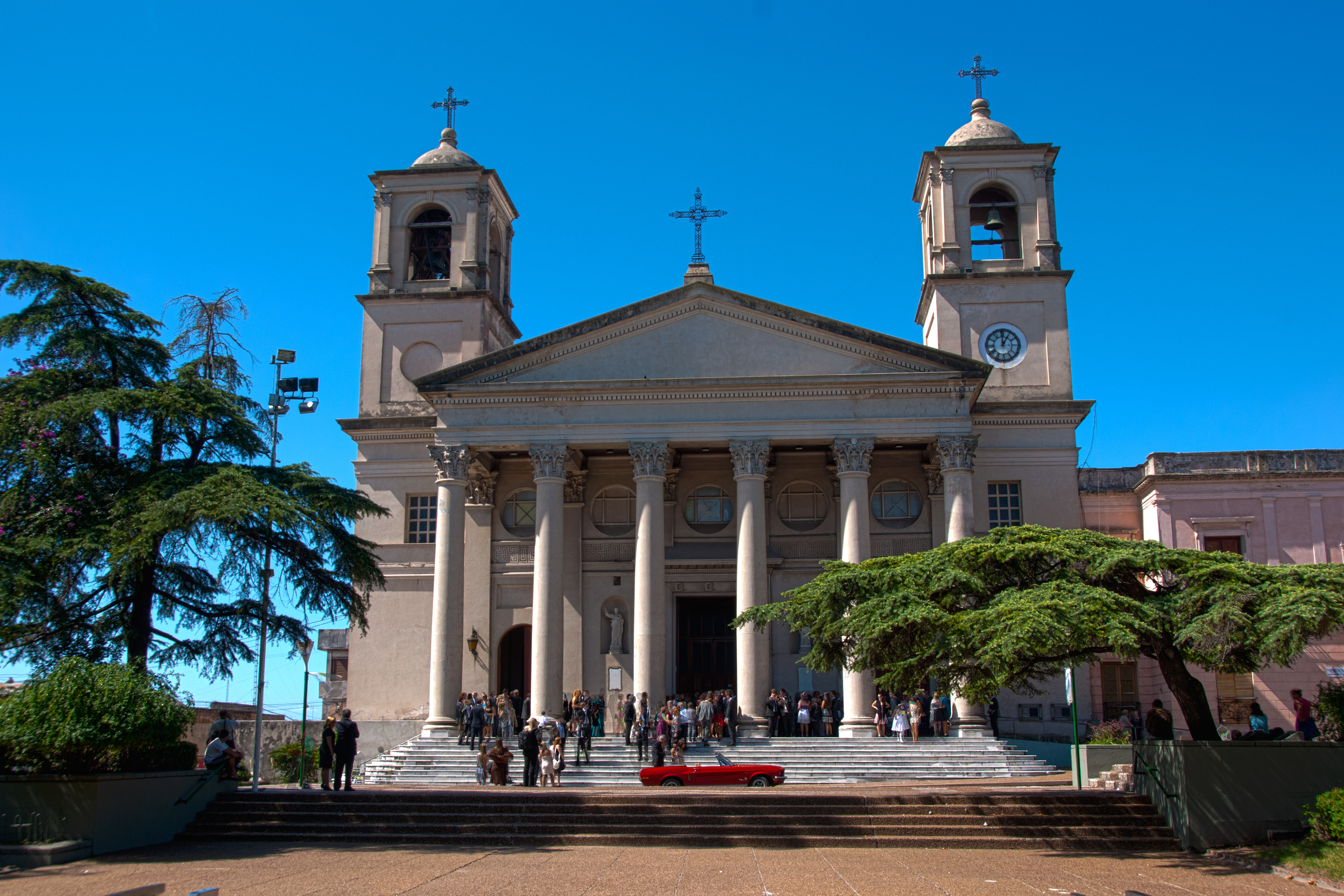
Worshippers at the Basilica of Our Lady of the Rosary and St. Benedict of Palermo in Paysandú.

Christianity is the dominant religion in Uruguay, with Roman Catholicism being its largest denomination. However, around 44.5% of the Uruguayan population is non-religious as of 2018. Uruguay has no official religion, as Church and State were officially separated with the Constitution of 1918. However, secularization measures had already been implemented by the 1870s.

Article 5 of the Constitution of the Republic enshrines freedom of worship, thereby making any discrimination based on religion punishable by law, and obligating the government to ensure the protection of this freedom. Uruguay is the most secularized country in the Americas, and despite its predominantly Christian population and deep-rooted Christian tradition, the country has undertaken significant measures to reduce the influence of religion in public life. For instance, many Christian holidays, such as Christmas and the Holy Week, are recognized as public holidays but are officially known by secular designations, such as Día de la Familia (Spanish for 'Family Day') and Semana de Turismo (Spanish for 'Tourism Week'), respectively.

Aside from Christianity in its various denominations, Judaism constitutes another religion of notable presence in Uruguay, followed by Umbanda, although the latter is represented in considerably smaller numbers. Other world religions such as Islam, Buddhism and Hinduism have a negligible presence in the country.

== Demographics ==
San Carlos Borromeo, Uruguay's oldest church, is located in San Carlos, Maldonado Department.

According to a 2014 survey by the Pew Research Center, 57% of the population has a Christian background (42% Catholic and 15% Protestant), 37% said they were religiously unaffiliated, and 6% were 'other religion' which includes Baha'is, Buddhists, Jehovah’s Witnesses, The Church of Jesus Christ of Latter-day Saints (Mormons), the Valdense (Waldensian) Church, Afro-Umbandists (a mix of Catholicism with African and traditional Indigenous beliefs), the Unification Church, and Brahma Kumaris, along with a small number of Jews, Hindus and Muslims.

Although the majority of Uruguayans do not actively practice a religion, they are nominally members of the Catholic Church. However, Protestants are more active. The first Anglican church in the country was erected in 1844 by British traders, and is considered a historical landmark. Other religious groups in Uruguay include the Latter-day Saints, Jehovah's Witnesses, and the Mennonites. It is widely considered the most secular nation in the Americas. One cause of this was that Spanish colonial missions sent priests to convert indigenous people, who had always been a very small population in Uruguay.

According to a study by Latinobarómetro in 2010, 39% of Uruguayans are Roman Catholics and 11% are Evangelical Protestants. 3% of the population practices other religions such as Buddhism, Judaism, Islam. Within that 3% are included those who refused to answer the survey.

Official survey results	2006	2007	2018
Christianity	56.1	55.6	54.3
Catholic	46.0	45.1	44.8
Other Christian	10.1	10.5	9.5
No religion	42.6	42.9	44.5
Deism	26.9	27.8	30.1
Atheism	15.7	15.1	12.3
Agnosticism	15.7	15.1	2.1
Animist and Umbanda	0.6	0.7	0.7
Jewish	0.4	0.4	0.3
Other	0.3	0.4	0.2

== Religious freedom ==
The Constitution of Uruguay provides for the freedom of religion and states that "the State supports no religion". Discrimination on religious grounds is illegal. The National Institute of Human Rights, part of the parliament, hears complaints of religious discrimination and conducts investigations, ultimately deciding whether the case should receive a judicial or administrative hearing. The institute also provides free legal resources to complainants.

Religious groups may register with the government as nonprofit organizations in order to receive tax breaks. Local government regulates the use of public land for burials. Many departments allow for all religious groups to use public cemeteries.

Religious instruction is prohibited in public schools. Although public schools close for certain Christian holidays, the government does not refer to these holidays by their Christian names. Students belonging to other religions may miss classes to observe their religious traditions without penalty. Private schools may decide which holidays to observe.

In 2022, Jewish leaders reported continuing antisemitic press and social media commentary; Muslim leaders stated that it can be difficult to convince private sector employers to respect prayer times during work hours and to obtain permission to leave work early to attend Friday prayers, but this is mainly due to lack of knowledge rather than deliberate discrimination.

In 2023, the country was scored 4 out of 4 for religious freedom by Freedom House, a US government funded think tank.

== See also ==
- Roman Catholic Church in Uruguay
- Buddhism in Uruguay
- Hinduism in Uruguay
- Irreligion in Uruguay
- Islam in Uruguay
- Judaism in Uruguay
- Bahá'í Faith in Uruguay
