= Telecommunications Tower (Montevideo) =

Tower block in Montevideo, Uruguay

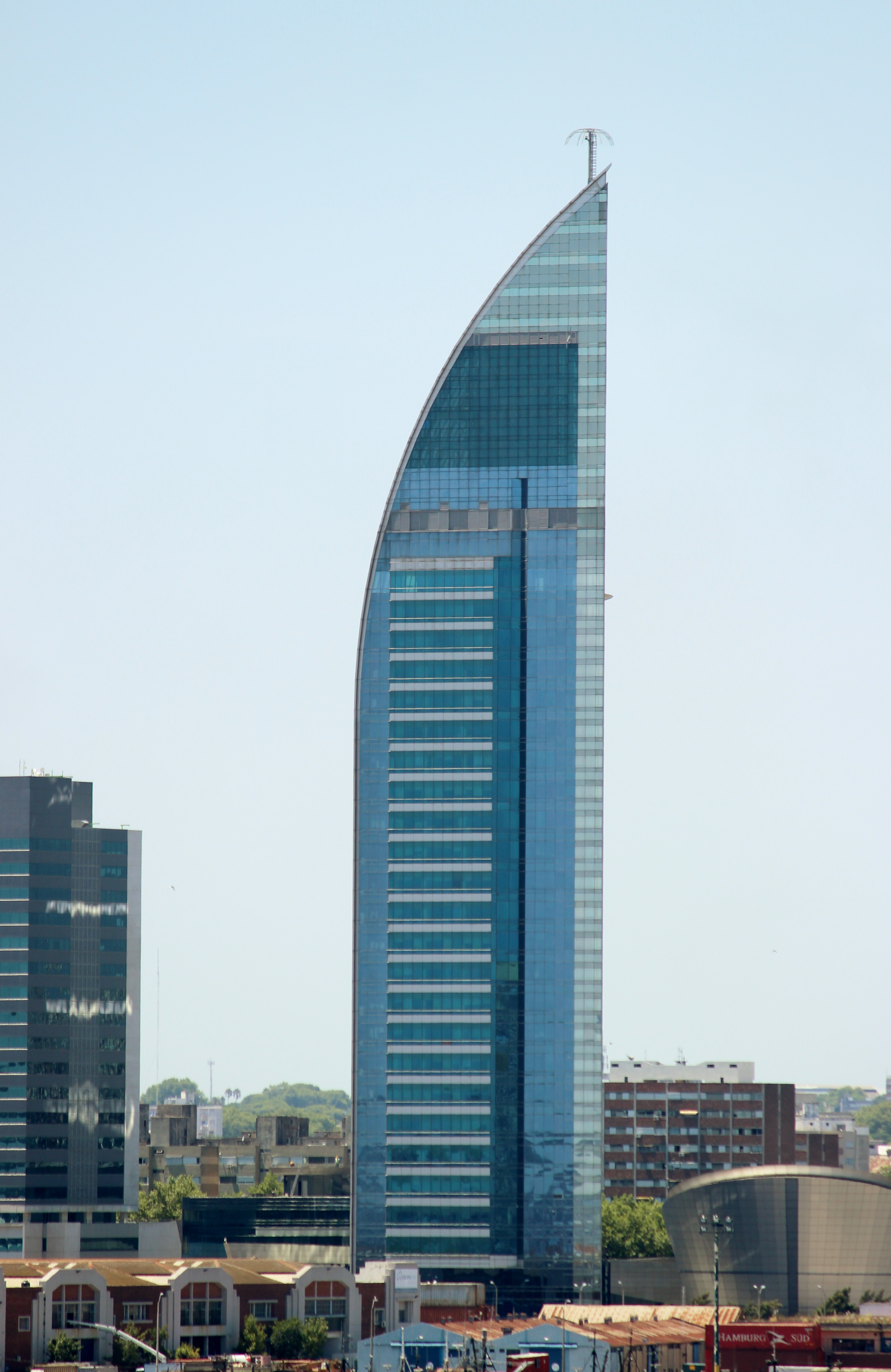
- Interactive map of the Telecommunications Tower area

General information
- Status: Completed
- Location: Montevideo, Uruguay
- Coordinates: 34°53′31″S 56°11′41″W
- Construction started: 1997
- Completed: 2002
- Cost: US$ 100 million
- Owner: ANTEL

Height
- Roof: 157.6 m (517 ft)

Technical details
- Floor count: 35
- Floor area: 19,459 m^{2} (209,450 sq ft)
- Lifts/elevators: 6

Design and construction
- Architects: Carlos Ott; American Bridge
- Main contractor: Stiler S.A.

Website
- www.descubrimontevideo.uy/en/telecommunications-tower

Torre de las Telecomunicaciones (Telecommunications Tower), or Torre Joaquín Torres García (Joaquín Torres García Tower), usually referred as Antel Tower, is a 157-meter-tall (515 ft) building with 35 floors located in Montevideo, Uruguay.

It hosts the headquarters of Uruguay's government-owned telecommunications company, ANTEL, and is the tallest skyscraper in the country. Designed by the Uruguayan-Canadian architect Carlos Ott, it is situated by the side of the Bay of Montevideo. The tower was completed by American Bridge and other design/built consortium team members in 2002.

== Description ==
With a total area of 19,459 m^{2} (209,450 sq ft), the complex consists of the main tower, the Customer Service Building, the Telecommunications Museum and the Auditorium. There are guided visits all through the week.

== Controversy ==
When its construction was announced, many politicians complained about its cost ($40 million, plus $25 million for the construction of the other 5 buildings of the Telecommunications Complex).

Problems during its construction turned the original $65 million into $102 million.

== See also ==
- ANTEL
- Communications in Uruguay
- American Bridge Company
- List of tallest buildings in Uruguay
