= List of islands of Uruguay =

This is a list of islands of Uruguay.

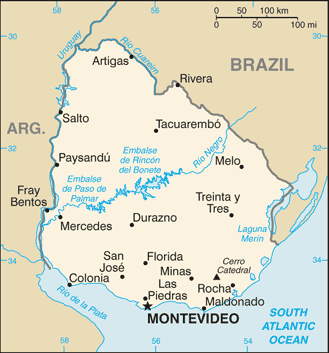
A map of Uruguay

- Brazilian Island (disputed with Brazil)
- Farallón Island
- Gorriti Island
- Juncal Island
- Isla de Flores
- Isla de las Gaviotas
- Isla de Lobos (Atlantic Ocean, near Punta del Este)
- Isla de Lobos (confluence of Negro River and Uruguay River)
- Isla del Padre
- San Gabriel Island
- Timoteo Domínguez Island
- Vizcaíno Island

== See also ==
- Geography of Uruguay
- List of Uruguay-related topics
- List of islands
- List of islands by area
- List of islands by highest point
- List of islands by population
- List of islands in lakes
- List of islands in the Atlantic Ocean
- List of islands of South America
