= Dedicado =

Uruguayan telecommunications company

- Company type: Private corporation
- Genre: Telecommunications
- Headquarters: Montevideo, Uruguay
- Area served: Uruguay
- Website: www.dedicado.com.uy

Dedicado is a Uruguayan telecommunications company. The main product supplied by the firm is fixed base wireless Internet service, which as of June 2014 it provided to 14,168 customers throughout Uruguay (2% of the Uruguayan fixed broadband market.)

== Competition ==
Its product competes with a variety of Internet service offerings:

In urban and suburban settings:

- ADSL/fiber Internet service offerings from Antel
- 3G/4G mobile cellular Internet service from Antel, Claro and Movistar

In rural settings:

- "Ruralcel", a fixed base wireless service from Antel based on their 3G infrastructure
- 3G mobile cellular Internet service from Antel, Claro and Movistar

Dedicado's wireless service offers fixed IP addresses and no bandwidth throttling or capping, which differentiates it favorably from most of these competitive offerings.
