= Egyptian Center of Islamic Culture, Montevideo =

Islamic cultural center in Montevideo, Uruguay

Egyptian Center of Islamic Culture
- Centro Egipcio de la Cultura Islámica
- Location of the mosque in Uruguay

Religion
- Affiliation: Sunni Islam
- Ecclesiastical or organizational status: Mosque
- Status: Active

Location
- Location: Montevideo
- Country: Uruguay
- Interactive map of Egyptian Center of Islamic Culture
- Administration: Egyptian Embassy in Montevideo
- Coordinates: 34°54′27″S 56°09′25″W

Architecture
- Type: Mosque (adapted building)
- Established: 1982
- Interior area: 170 m (560 ft)

Website
- centroislamicouruguay.com.uy

The Egyptian Center of Islamic Culture (Spanish: Centro Egipcio de la Cultura Islámica), also known as the Mosque of Montevideo, is a mosque and cultural center located at Baltasar Vargas 1178 in Montevideo, Uruguay.

The mosque has been in operation since 1982, housed in a former cemetery plot adapted into a religious and cultural institution. The building covers an area of approximately 170 square metres (1,800 sq ft).

As of 2022, the center is overseen by Sheik Samir Selim and operates under the auspices of the Embassy of the Arab Republic of Egypt in Uruguay. It hosts daily prayers, weekly Jummah services, Arabic language instruction across multiple levels, Qur’an teaching sessions, and cultural lectures. The center is also available for visits and educational outreach.

The center plays a central role in Uruguay’s Muslim life, welcoming both Muslims and non-Muslims. It offers an inclusive environment where conversions to Islam occur—on average, one individual per two weeks embraces the faith at this location.

== See also ==
- Islam in Uruguay
- List of mosques in the Americas
- Egypt–Uruguay relations
