= Egypt–Uruguay relations =

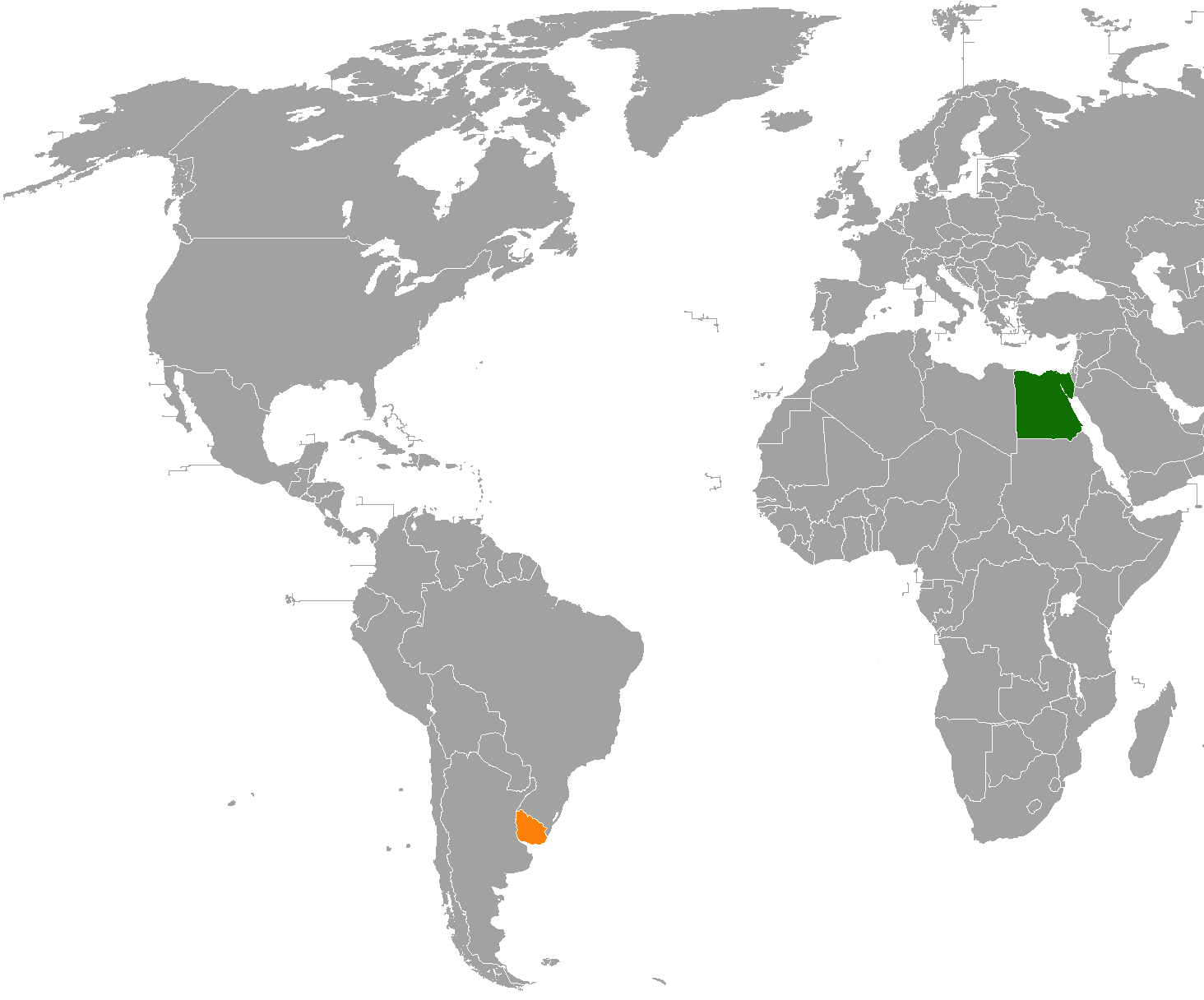
- Egypt: Uruguay

Egypt has an embassy in Montevideo. Uruguay has an embassy in Cairo and a consulate in Alexandria.

Both countries are members of the Group of 77.

== Trade ==
In trading relationships, Egypt is an important trading partner for Uruguay, with over US$26m in soybean sales; Egypt is also an important buyer of Uruguayan lambs. Since 2004, there is a Framework Agreement between Egypt and the Mercosur countries.

== Culture ==
Montevideo has a small Ancient Egyptian Museum, held by the Uruguayan Society of Egyptology (established 1980); a notable Uruguayan Egyptologist is Juan José Castillos.

The Egyptian Center of Islamic Culture is a mosque and cultural center, located in Montevideo.

== See also ==
- Foreign relations of Egypt
- Foreign relations of Uruguay
