= Telecommunications in Uruguay =

Telecommunications in Uruguay include radio, television, telephones, and the Internet in Uruguay.

== General outline ==
Despite having poor levels of investment in the fixed-line sector, the small size of Uruguay's population has enabled the country to attain one of the highest telecommunication density levels in South America. The teledensity was already the second highest in the continent in the 1990s (after French Guiana) and the highest in 2001. Reaching a peak of 162.077 in 2014, the density declined in subsequent years, yet it was still 136.921 as of 2021. Mobile penetration was the second highest in Latin America (after Panama) as of 2022. Furthermore, the country already achieved a 100% digitalization of main lines by 1999.

The telecommunications sector is partially under a state monopoly through the public company ANTEL, including a monopoly on landline telephony. While this sector was privatized in many Latin American countries during the 1990s, Uruguay managed to keep telecommunications in public hands, partially under pressure from popular opinion through referendums. However, steps have been made to introduce liberalization and to allow for the entry of more private firms into the cellular sector. In 2022, under Luis Lacalle Pou, Uruguay authorized five cable companies into the fixed broadband internet sector.

== Radio and television ==
Uruguay has a mixture of privately owned and state-run broadcast media; more than 100 commercial radio stations and about 20 TV channels. Cable TV is readily available. Uruguay adopted the hybrid Japanese/Brazilian HDTV standard (ISDB-T) in December 2010.

- International call sign prefixes for radio and television stations: CV, CW, and CX

== Telephones ==
- Land lines: 1,165,673 lines in use, equivalent to 0.33 lines per capita (December 2019).
- Mobile cellular lines: 5,667,631 lines in use, equivalent to 1.64 lines per capita (December 2019).
- Domestic system: fully digitalized, most modern facilities concentrated in Montevideo; nationwide microwave radio relay network.
- Country calling code: 598.
- Submarine cable systems: UNISUR submarine cable system provides direct connectivity to Brazil and Argentina.
- Satellite earth stations: Two, Intelsat (Atlantic Ocean).

== Internet ==
- Internet users: 2.7- million (2020).
- Internet hosts: 1.036 million (2012).
- Average connection speed (Q4 2016): 8.2 Mbit/s (world average=7.0 Mbit/s)
- Top-level domain: .uy

In Uruguay, one can access the Internet mainly by using:

- FTTH services, provided by the state-owned company (ANTEL), which covers most of Montevideo; and the rest of the 19 departments' most important cities.
- ADSL services, provided by the state-owned company (ANTEL).
- LTE 4G service with high speed connections, about 20 Mbit/s, offered by all the mobile phone companies.
- 3G mobile Internet, offered by all the mobile phone companies.
- Wireless ISPs, which have a tendency to be more expensive because of high taxation and radio spectrum license costs.
- WiMax launched by Dedicado in 2012.
- WiFi access provided at shopping malls, bus lines and most of commercial business.

=== Fiber to the home ===
In November 2010, ANTEL announced that it would start rolling out Fiber to the home (FTTH) in the second half of 2011. As of September 2017, 49% of the homes with Internet access do so via FTTH.

As of January 2019 Antel offers the following fiber to the home plans:

- Hogar Básico: up to 60 Mbit/s down and 10 Mbit/s up for 1105 UYU (US$34). After 350 GB of monthly data consumption speed reduced to 3 Mbit/s down and 512 kbit/s up.
- Hogar Plus: up to 120 Mbit/s down and 12 Mbit/s up for 1,470 UYU (US$45). After 500 GB of monthly data consumption speed reduced to 6 Mbit/s down and 1 Mbit/s up.
- Hogar Premium: up to 240 Mbit/s down and 24 Mbit/s up for 2,100 UYU (US$65). After 700 GB of monthly data consumption speed reduced to 12 Mbit/s down and 1 Mbit/s up.
- Entretenimiento Plus: up to 300 Mbit/s down and 30 Mbit/s up for 2,500 UYU (US$77). After 1,000 GB of monthly data consumption speed reduced to 12 Mbit/s down and 1 Mbit/s up.

All home consumer plans provide a dynamic IP address only.

There are also business plans available with no monthly data consumption limit that provide fixed IP addresses.

=== ADSL ===
ANTEL is the only ISP to provide ADSL service since it enjoys a monopoly in the basic telephony area. Other ISP use other technologies, such as radio, to get to customers.

The following are the plans marketed to home users by Antel as of May 2018. All plans require having a corresponding voice phone service with Antel. All prices include VAT.

Consumer data plans

- Internet Básico: 3,072 kbit/s down and 512 kbit/s up for 955 UYU (US$31) a month. After 350 Gb of data consumption speed reduced to 2,048 kbit/s down and 512 kbit/s up.
- Internet Plus: 5,120 kbit/s down and 512 kbit/s up for 1,265 UYU (US$41) a month. After 500 Gb of data consumption speed reduced to 2,048 kbit/s down and 512 kbit/s up.
- Internet Premium: 10,240 kbit/s down and 512 kbit/s up for 1,700 UYU (US$55) a month. After 700 Gb of data consumption speed reduced to 8,192 kbit/s down and 512 kbit/s up.

All consumer plans provide a dynamic IP address.

=== Fixed wireless ===
Most of Uruguay's landmass is too far away from cities to have wired Internet access. For customers in these rural and low density suburban areas, fixed wireless ISPs provide a service. Wireless Internet service has also provided city Internet users with some degree of choice in a country where private companies have not been allowed to offer wired alternatives (e.g. cable TV Internet, fiber to the home) to the state-operated ADSL service.

Dedicado is a local wireless ISP. It appeared before or about at the same time as Anteldata (about in 1999), but since ADSL was not available at the same time on every neighborhood, Dedicado had the majority of the permanent Internet connections. As of November 2007, ADSL is available in every neighborhood in Montevideo, and in most other cities, and Dedicado lost a big market share, both because being more expensive and giving bad service to their users. They started a big advertising campaign, but didn't pay attention to the technical details related to their number of users, so their quality of service decreased. As of 2012, their quality of service issues appear to be on the mend, but their pricing issues continue especially in the rural market where they have no credible competition and have steadily increased prices. Dedicado originally operated Ericsson fixed wireless equipment and later transitioned to Motorola Canopy and Cambium technology. In 2005, they started deploying WiMAX services. However, as of May 2010, the service is not offered nor advertised yet. There are other wireless ISPs, but Dedicado is the main one.

Telmex is another entrant in the Uruguayan fixed wireless space. As of early 2012, they were still a tentative player however, with limited coverage of the country and some technical shortcomings (e.g. no Skype connectivity).

In February 2012, Antel announced a push to provide fixed wireless Internet service to rural customers using their 3G cellular network. As of November 2012, the service was being actively offered to customers of the company's Ruralcel fixed wireless telephone service. Customers who sign up get the equipment (a ZTE MF612/MF32 or Huawei B660 3G router) and monthly Internet service for free. While the network and router are capable of supporting multi-Mbit/s service, the free offering is throttled back to 256 kb down/64 kb upload speeds and capped at 1 Gbyte of monthly data transfer (except for a small number of customers grandfathered from a previous service). Once that data limit is reached, the customer has to recharge the service using a prepaid card at a rate of approximately US$10/Gbyte. There is an alternative monthly billing plan that offers 2 Mbit/s down and 512 Mbit/s up with a 5 Gbyte data cap for US$15, plus US$10 for each additional Gbyte (up to 5 Gbyte). There is no unlimited data plan, which limits this technology's ability to compete in the non-residential fixed wireless space against vendors like Dedicado.

=== Mobile wireless ===
Mobile internet access via cellular networks represents a major segment of Uruguay's telecommunications market. All three primary operators: Antel, Claro, and Movistar, provide mobile data plans for smartphones and USB modems for personal computers. Additionally, Antel offers combined subscriptions featuring both cellular data and fixed ADSL access. Network coverage and data speeds expanded as providers transitioned from 3G to 4G technology, beginning in the Montevideo metropolitan area, with Antel maintaining the largest geographical coverage footprint as of 2012.

A key characteristic of this market is the implementation of data volume caps across all providers. As of August 2012, operators did not offer un-capped mobile data plans, with limited exceptions such as off-peak unlimited usage windows. Consequently, mobile data services served primarily as a complement to, rather than a replacement for, fixed wireless and landline internet services, which typically feature unlimited data allowances.

=== Internet service providers ===
The main Internet service providers (ISPs) in Uruguay are:

- ANTEL (http://www.antel.com.uy)
- Claro (https://www.claro.com.uy)
- Dedicado (https://www.dedicado.com.uy)
- Movistar (http://www.movistar.com.uy)

=== Cable Internet ===
Despite a fully developed cable network in all mid- and large-size cities, Uruguayan government regulators historically precluded cable companies from providing Internet access through their systems. This made Uruguay and Cuba the only countries in the Americas missing this component of the Internet access ecosystem. In June 2022 however the Uruguayan government reversed this long standing situation opening the market to selected cable providers and effectively ending Antel's monopoly on wired Internet services.

=== Internet censorship and surveillance ===
There are no government restrictions on access to or usage of the Internet or credible reports that the government monitors e-mail or Internet chat rooms without judicial oversight.

Uruguayan law provides for freedom of speech and press, and the government generally respects these rights in practice. An independent press, an effective judiciary, and a functioning democratic political system combine to ensure these rights. The law also prohibits arbitrary interference with privacy, family, home, or correspondence, and the government generally respects these prohibitions in practice.

In August 2016 the President of URSEC (the Uruguayan government agency equivalent to the FCC in the US) stated that his agency was at the government's beck and call to block the IP address of the servers of Uber to keep its app from operating in Uruguay. If carried out this would constitute the first and only known instance of Great Firewall style blocked-IP censorship in Uruguay. In the same interview he stated that WhatsApp "transgresses the limits of communications". In July 2017 the Uruguayan subsecretary of economy stated that the government was considering "blocking the signals" of online gaming sites, which in Internet terms would seem to refer to some kind of IP-based censorship.

In April 2018 a Uruguayan court ordered all Uruguayan ISPs to block their users from accessing the content of specific sites broadcasting sports events copyrighted by Fox Sports Latin America. This is a key precedent that differs dramatically from the piracy enforcement in first world countries like the US, which focuses on the takedown of the sites themselves and does not engage in IP-based censorship. A Fox spokesman declared the network would try to use the precedent to get similar rulings in other Latin American countries.

In November 2016 the Uruguayan Ministry of the Interior initiated legal action against a Facebook and Twitter site ("chorros_uy") that reports criminal activity across Uruguay, alleging that it "raises public alarm". The Interamerican Press Society swiftly criticized the Ministry's attempt to censor the site as "contrary to democracy's norms".

As of 2017 a surveillance software suite, called "Guardián", capable of spying internet traffic, email accounts, social networks and telephone calls is being used without proper authorization from the Judiciary.
