= International rankings of Uruguay =

The following are international rankings of Uruguay.

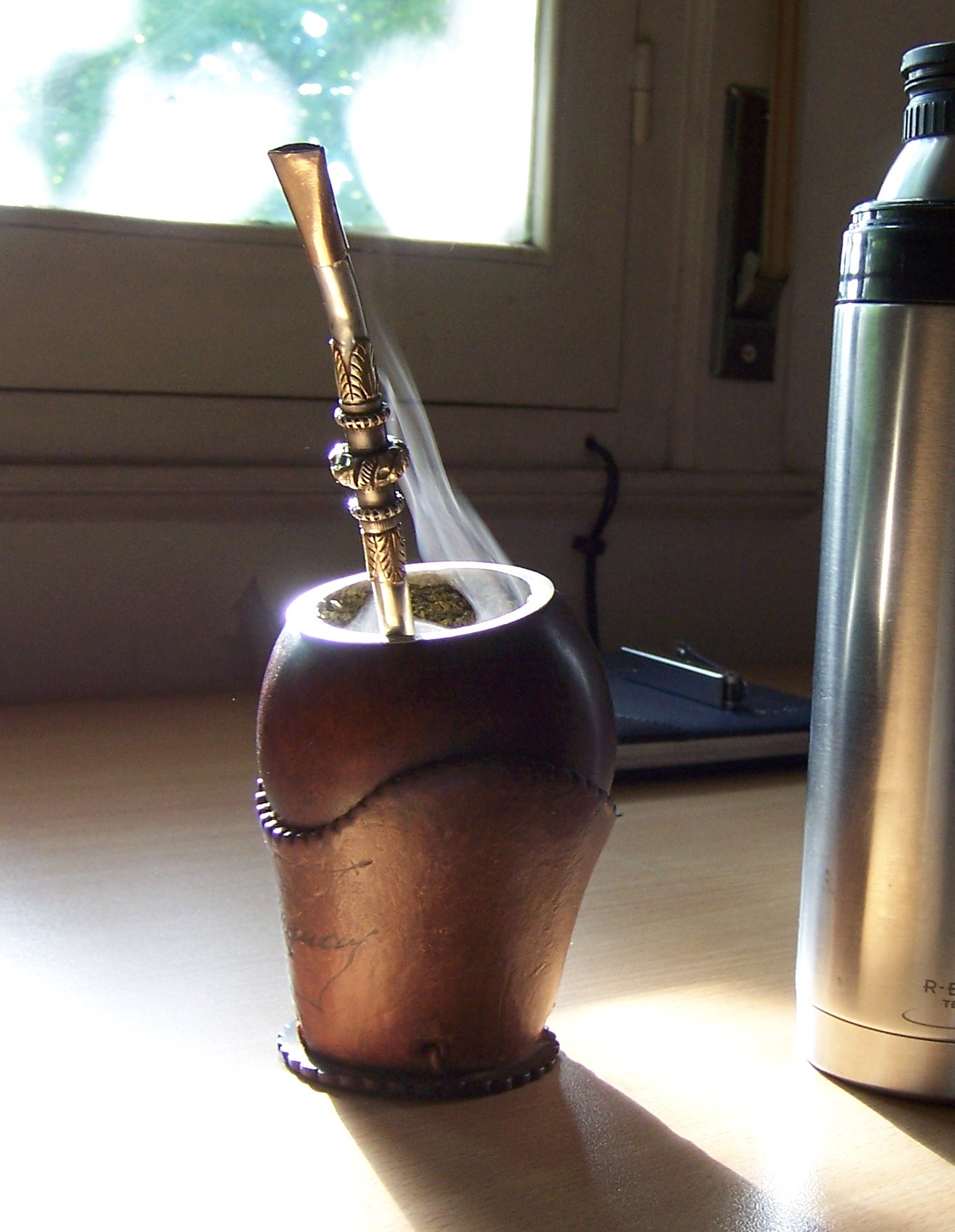
Steaming yerba mate infusion in its customary gourd, the Uruguayan national drink

== Demographics ==
- Population ranked 134 out 233 nations

== Economy ==
- Nominal GDP ranked 80 out of 216 economies
- GDP per capita – 60th highest, at I$11,969
- Income Equality, 0.449 (Gini Index)
- Unemployment rate – 112th, at 8.70%

== Education ==
- Literacy Rate – 51st, at 97.7%

== Energy ==
- Total electricity consumption ranked 88th highest consumption

== Environment ==
- Carbon dioxide emissions per capita ranked 125th highest emissions

== Geography ==
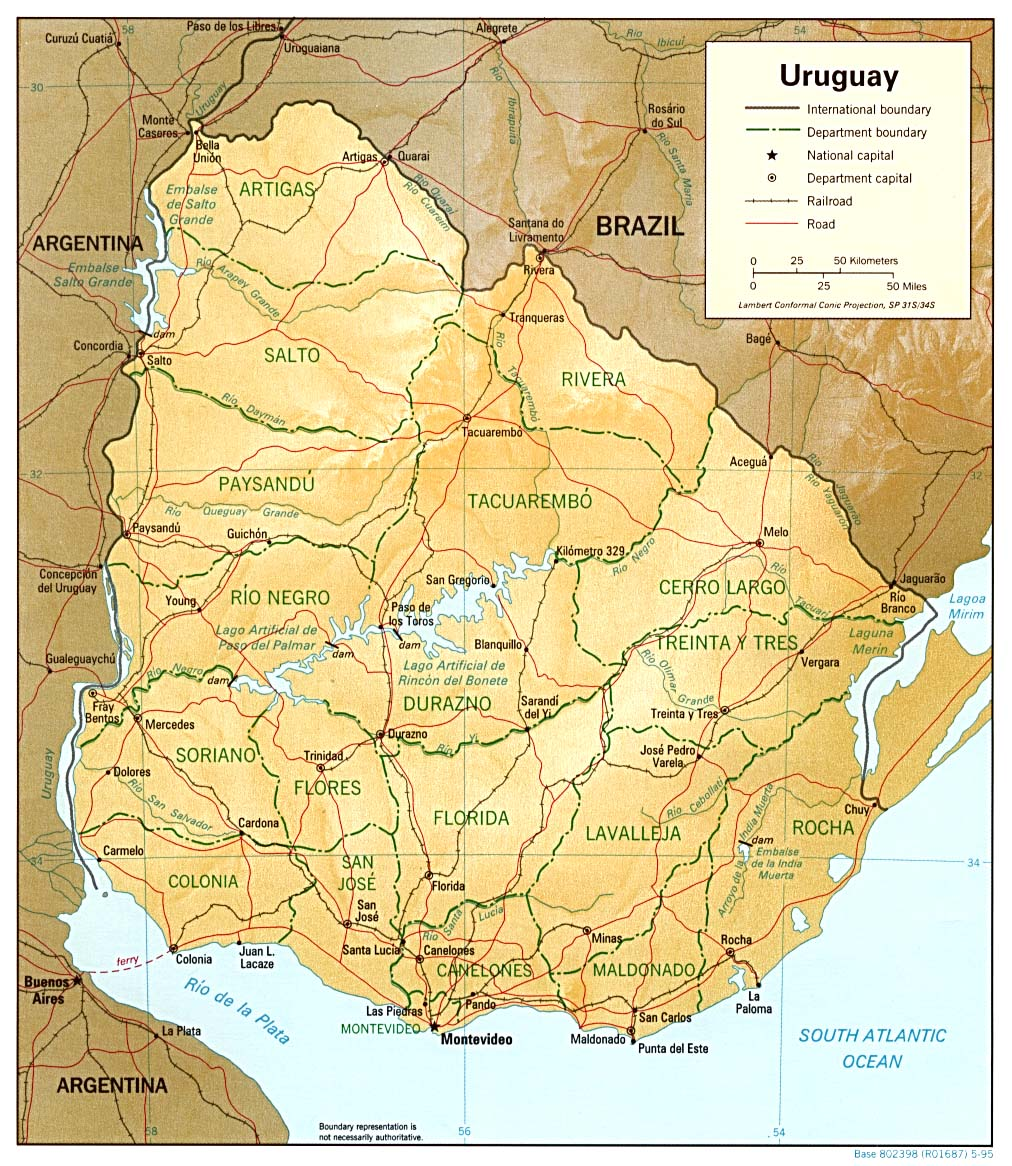
Relief map of Uruguay

- Area ranked 89 out of 195 countries with 175,015 sq km

== Government ==
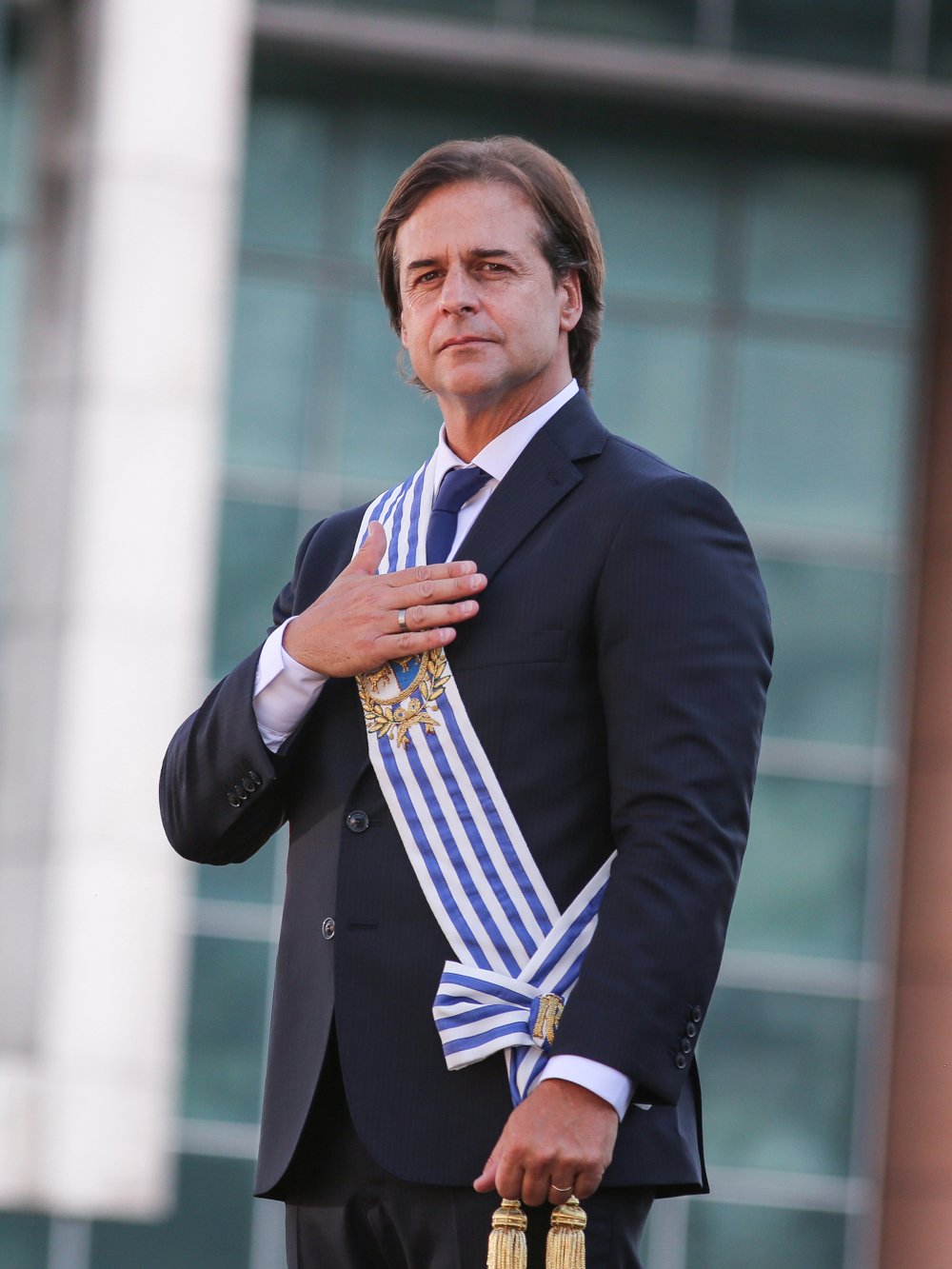
Uruguay's president Luis Alberto Lacalle Pou.

== Health ==
- Fertility rate- 140th most fertile, at 1.85 per woman
- Birth rate – 157th most births, at 13.91 per 1000 people
- Infant mortality – 128th most deaths, at 1 per 1000 live births
- Death rate – 84th highest death rate, at 9.16 per 1000 people
- Life Expectancy – 47th highest, at 76.4 years
- Suicide Rate – 24th highest suicide rate, at 15.1 for males and 6.4 for females per 100,000 people
- HIV/AIDS rate – 108th most cases, at 0.30%

== Military ==
- Global Peace Index 2009, ranked 25
- Military expenditures as a percentage of GDP ranked 104

== Religion ==
Uruguay's oldest church in San Carlos, Maldonado

== Society ==
- Smoking in Uruguay: first country in Latin America to establish an indoor smoking ban
- Human Development Index – 46th high, at 0.852

== Technology ==
- World Intellectual Property Organization: Global Innovation Index 2026, ranked 66 out of 139 countries

== Latin America comparative index ==
Index (Year)	Author / Editor / Source	Year of publication	Countries sampled	World Ranking (Note: Worldwide ranking among countries evaluated.)	Ranking L.A. (Note: Ranking among the 20 Latin American countries (Puerto Rico is not included).)
Human Poverty, HPI-1 (2005) (Note: Ranking among 108 developing countries with available data only.)	United Nations (UNDP)	2007–08	108	2nd	1st
Poverty below $2 a day (1990–2005) (Note: Ranking among 71 developing countries with available data only. Countries in the sample surveyed between 1990 and 2005. Refers to population below income poverty line as defined by the World Bank's $2 per day indicator)	United Nations (UNDP)	2007–08	71	3rd	2nd
Global Peace (2009)	The Economist	2008	140	21st	2nd
Corruption Perception (2008) (Note: The 2008 CPI for Uruguay is equal to that of Chile, therefore both countries are tied in first place for Latin America.)	Transparency International	2008	180	23rd	1st
Democracy (2006)	The Economist	2007	167	23rd	2nd
Prosperity Index (2008)	Legatum Institute	2008	104	36th	3rd
Press Freedom (2007)	Reporters Without Borders	2007	169	37th	2nd
Economic Freedom (2008)	The Wall Street Journal	2008	157	38th	3rd
Human Development (2005)	United Nations (UNDP)	2007–08	177	46th	3rd
Quality-of-life (2005)	The Economist	2007	111	46th	6th
Travel and Tourism Competitiveness (2008)	World Economic Forum	2008	130	63rd	7th
Global Competitiveness (2009–2010)	World Economic Forum	2009–10	131	65th	6th
Income inequality (1989–2007) (Note: Because the Gini coefficient used for the ranking corresponds to different years depending on the country, and the underlying household surveys differ in method and in the type of data collected, the distribution data are not strictly comparable across countries. The ranking therefore is only a proxy for reference purposes, and though the source is the same, the sample is smaller than for the HDI)	United Nations (UNDP)	2007–2008	126	88th	2nd

=== Political and economic rankings ===
GDP per capita – 60th highest, at I$11,969
Human Development Index – 46th highest, at 0.852
Income Equality, 0.449 (Gini Index)
Literacy Rate – 51st, at 97.7%
Unemployment rate – 112th, at 8.70%

=== Health rankings ===
Fertility rate- 140th most fertile, at 1.85 per woman

Birth rate – 157th most births, at 13.91 per 1000 people

Infant mortality – 128th most deaths, at 1 per 1000 live births

Death rate – 84th highest death rate, at 9.16 per 1000 people
Life Expectancy – 47th highest, at 76.4 years

Suicide Rate – 24th highest suicide rate, at 15.1 for males and 6.4 for females per 100,000 people

HIV/AIDS rate – 108th most cases, at 0.30%

=== Other rankings ===
CO_{2} emissions – 125th highest emissions, at 1.65 tonnes per capita
Electricity Consumption – 88th highest consumption of electricity, at 7,762,000,000 kWh
Broadband Internet access – no data
Global Peace Index – 25th highest peace rate in 2009

=== Comparative ranking by index ===
Index (Year)	Author / Editor / Source	Year of publication	Countries sampled	World Ranking (Note: Worldwide ranking among countries evaluated.)	Ranking L.A. (Note: Ranking among the 20 Latin American countries (Puerto Rico is not included).)
Global Peace (2009)	The Economist	2008	140	21st	2nd
Corruption Perception (2008) (Note: The 2008 CPI for Uruguay is equal to that of Chile, therefore both countries are tied in first place for Latin America.)	Transparency International	2008	180	23rd	1st
Democracy (2006)	The Economist	2007	167	23rd	2nd
Prosperity Index (2008)	Legatum Institute	2008	104	36th	3rd
Press Freedom (2007)	Reporters Without Borders	2007	169	37th	2nd
Economic Freedom (2008)	The Wall Street Journal	2008	157	38th	3rd
Networked Readiness Index (2010–2011) (Global Information Technology Report)	World Economic Forum	2011	138	45th	2nd
Human Development (2005)	United Nations (UNDP)	2007–08	177	46th	3rd
Quality-of-life (2005)	The Economist	2007	111	46th	6th
Travel and Tourism Competitiveness (2008)	World Economic Forum	2008	130	63rd	7th
Global Competitiveness (2009–2010)	World Economic Forum	2009–10	131	65th	6th
Income inequality (1989–2007) (Note: Because the Gini coefficient used for the ranking corresponds to different years depending on the country, and the underlying household surveys differ in method and in the type of data collected, the distribution data are not strictly comparable across countries. The ranking therefore is only a proxy for reference purposes, and though the source is the same, the sample is smaller than for the HDI)	United Nations (UNDP)	2007–2008	126	88th	2nd

== See also ==
- Lists of countries
- Lists by country
- List of international rankings
