= Irreligion in Uruguay =

Religion in Uruguay (2021)
1. Deist (30.1%)
2. Atheist or Agnostic (14.4%)
3. Catholic (44.8%)
4. Other Christian (9.50%)
5. Other/Unspecified (1.20%)

According to public opinion polls, irreligion in Uruguay ranges from 30 to 40 to over 47 percent of the population. Uruguay has been the least-religious country in South America due to nineteenth-century political events influenced by positivism, secularism, and other beliefs held by intellectual Europeans. The resistance of the indigenous population to evangelization, which prevented the establishment of religion during the colonial era, has also been influential. According to Nestor DaCosta (2003), irreligion has historically been a feature of Uruguayan identity.

The Christian Post (2026) reported that 49% of Uruguay identified as atheist or had no religion.

Atheism and agnosticism have grown significantly. Non-believers are a statistical minority but have been present for more than a century. Some investigations present that in recent times, secularism and non-religious beliefs have grown in the religious landscape of Uruguay due to the influence of postmodernism, as in Western Europe. Some experts argue that the number of non-religious people has stagnated, but believers in non-Christian faiths have been growing in numbers in recent decades (Conwell Investigation, 2013)..

== Secularism ==
During the Spanish colonial period, the Catholic Church had less influence in Uruguay than in other Hispanic regions because of the relatively-small number of indigenous peoples. Catholicism was easily introduced to Spaniards and mestizos and, until the first half of the nineteenth century, the church regulated the state, a number of institutions, and land as it did in other Latin American countries. According to some historians, the Uruguayan dioceses were South America's least powerful; Spanish and Italian priests, less able to teaching religion, preferred to evangelize the rural poor. When Uruguay became a secular republic in 1917, the country was already receiving Spanish, Italian, and French immigrants. French immigrants in Uruguay were traditionally anti-clerical; many Spanish and Italians immigrants arrived as Catholics, but became independent of religion because of little ecclesiastical influence.

Independent of Spain and the Empire of Brazil, many educated Uruguayans were influenced by skeptical European writers and ancient Greek philosophy. After independence, cultured Uruguayans began espousing secular and humanist political views against the Catholic Church and the small (but growing) number of Afro-Brazilian religious practitioners. Control of Uruguay's cemeteries passed to the state in 1861, ending mandatory religious funerals. The Colorado Party dominated the government during the mid-1860s, with secular reforms which included civil marriage and the development of technology and urban areas. Many people with little knowledge of Catholicism became irreligious due to ignorance rather than disbelief.

In 1877, José Pedro Varela advocated secular education in Uruguay. Although Catholic leaders opposed state schools, the educated elite supported the concept of secular schools which taught science. A decade later, Archbishop Mariano Soler championed Catholic education.

Secularism waned for about a decade during the early 1890s. José Batlle y Ordóñez revived the movement early in the 20th century, allowing women to divorce and banning religious symbols from children's hospitals. "Batllism" enacted total separation of church and state in 1917, when Uruguay became a republic with a secular constitution and Marxist-inspired economic reforms. After the Batllist period (1903–1931), the church focused on educating Catholics and providing a Christian spiritual refuge to all citizens. The Colorado Party's influence was declining, and it was defeated by the National Party in the 1958 election.

== By year ==
Year	% Unaffiliated	% Christian	Others	Survey
1908	37.2	62.8	0	Census
1910*	39	61	0	Pew Forum
1950*	37	63	0	Pew Forum
1970	31	68	1	Pew Forum
1970	28.4	67.8	3.8	Conwell Studio
1980	35	61.4	3.6	Census
2006	40.4	58.2	1.3	Census
2014	37	60	3	Pew Forum
2020	29.8	61.2	9.0	Conwell Studio
2023	62.9	33.4	5.0	AmericasBarometer

By 1900, about ten percent of the world's nonreligious people lived in Uruguay. According to Latinobarómetro, the number of irreligious Uruguayans increased from 18 percent in 1995 to 38 percent in 2013.

== Future trends ==
According to the Pew Research Center's Religion and Public Life Project, Uruguay's nonreligious population will be 42.1 percent by 2050. The irreligious fertility rate is virtually identical to the Christian one, with Christian and nonreligious women giving birth to an average of two children from 2010 to 2015.
