= Tourism Week =

Holiday in Uruguay

Tourism Week is a secular holiday in Uruguay following same five day period as the Christian Holy Week. The holiday was created in 1919 when the Uruguay state formerly created separation from the Catholic Church.

== Background ==
The creation of Tourism Week was formerly designated on 23 of October 1919, as part of the formal separation from the Catholic Church created in Ley N° 6997. The law modified liturgical holidays as secular holidays with official designations for celebration in Uruguay, including other holidays such as the Day of the Kings (January 6) which was designated the Day of the Children, and Christmas which was designated as the Day of the Family.

== Activities ==
Tourism week is an important holiday for different kinds of festivals and celebrations in Uruguay, such as the annual bike race Vuelta Ciclista del Uruguay, Criollo week in Rural Prado, Rural del Prado, the week of Beer in Paysandú, and others.

The week also includes a bank holiday for Thursday and Friday, with most businesses not working in the Tourism sector also providing the days off.
