= Baháʼí Faith in Uruguay =

The Baháʼí Faith in Uruguay began after ʻAbdu'l-Bahá, then head of the religion, mentioned the country in 1916. The first Baháʼí to enter the country was Martha Root in 1919. The first pioneer to settle there was Wilfrid Barton early in 1940 and the first Baháʼí Local Spiritual Assembly of Montevideo was elected in 1942. By 1961 Uruguayan Baháʼís had elected the first National Spiritual Assembly and by 1963 there were three Local Assemblies plus other communities. By 2001 there was an estimated 4,000 Baháʼís in Uruguay.

== ʻAbdu'l-Bahá's Tablets of the Divine Plan ==
ʻAbdu'l-Bahá, the son of the founder of the religion, wrote a series of letters, or tablets, to the followers of the religion in the United States in 1916–1917; these letters were compiled together in the book titled Tablets of the Divine Plan. The sixth of the tablets was the first to mention Latin American regions and was written on April 8, 1916, but was delayed in being presented in the United States until 1919 – after the end of World War I and the Spanish flu. The first actions on the part of Baháʼí community towards Latin America were that of a few individuals who made trips to Mexico and South America near or before this unavailing in 1919, including Mr. and Mrs. Frankland, and Roy C. Wilhelm, and Martha Root. Root's travels, perhaps the first Baháʼí to Uruguay, began in the summer of 1919 – stopping first in Brazil, then Argentina and Uruguay before setting out to cross the Andes mountains into Chile in winter. The sixth tablet was translated and presented by Mirza Ahmad Sohrab on April 4, 1919, and published in Star of the West magazine on December 12, 1919.

"His Holiness Christ says: Travel ye to the East and to the West of the world and summon the people to the Kingdom of God. ... Attach great importance to the indigenous population of America ... the republics of the continent of South America—Colombia, Ecuador, Peru, Brazil, the Guianas, Bolivia, Chile, Argentina, Uruguay, Paraguay, Venezuela; also the islands to the north, east and west of South America, such as Falkland Islands, the Galapagòs, Juan Fernandez, Tobago and Trinidad...."

Following the release of these tablets and then ʻAbdu'l-Bahá's death in 1921, a few Baháʼís began moving to or at least visiting Latin America.

=== Seven Year Plan and succeeding decades ===
Shoghi Effendi, head of the religion after the death of ʻAbdu'l-Bahá, wrote a cable on May 1, 1936 to the Baháʼí Annual Convention of the United States and Canada, and asked for the systematic implementation of ʻAbdu'l-Bahá's vision to begin. In his cable he wrote:

Appeal to assembled delegates ponder historic appeal voiced by ʻAbdu'l-Bahá in Tablets of the Divine Plan. Urge earnest deliberation with incoming National Assembly to insure its complete fulfillment. First century of Baháʼí Era drawing to a close. Humanity entering outer fringes most perilous stage its existence. Opportunities of present hour unimaginably precious. Would to God every State within American Republic and every Republic in American continent might ere termination of this glorious century embrace the light of the Faith of Baháʼu'lláh and establish structural basis of His World Order.

Following the May 1 cable, another cable from Shoghi Effendi came on May 19 calling for permanent pioneers to be established in all the countries of Latin America. The Baháʼí National Spiritual Assembly of the United States and Canada appointed the Inter-America Committee to take charge of the preparations. During the 1937 Baháʼí North American Convention, Shoghi Effendi cabled advising the convention to prolong their deliberations to permit the delegates and the National Assembly to consult on a plan that would enable Baháʼís to go to Latin America as well as to include the completion of the outer structure of the Baháʼí House of Worship in Wilmette, Illinois. In 1937 the First Seven Year Plan (1937–44), which was an international plan designed by Shoghi Effendi, gave the American Baháʼís the goal of establishing the Baháʼí Faith in every country in Latin America. With the spread of American Baháʼís in Latin American, Baháʼí communities and Local Spiritual Assemblies began to form in 1938 across the rest of Latin America.

Early in 1940 the first pioneer, Wilfrid Barton, arrived in Uruguay. May Maxwell stopped one day in Uruguay on a trip in February 1940 and died a few days later while in Buenos Aires where Wilfrid Barton joined by newly arrived Simon Rosenzweig from Montevideo assisted in the funeral. Barton reports the first converts in spring of 1941 – Emilia A. Martinez Morente and Abraham Kassabian in Montevideo. The first Local Assembly of Montevideo was elected in 1942. Later in 1942 Barton reports of 13 Baháʼís and work was progressing in translating some literature including The Dawn-Breakers.

== After World War II ==
In the midst of World War II there is a report that the assembly of Montevideo was dissolved in early 1945 but was re-established by summer 1945. Barton was joined by pioneer Flora Hottes in early 1946. A regional committee to coordinate efforts and build unity and familiarity in regions leading to regional national assemblies were appointed in 1946 – Chili, Argentina, Uruguay, Paraguay were in one such committee's jurisdiction. Retrospectively, a stated purpose for the regional committee was to facilitate a shift in the balance of roles from North American guidance and Latin cooperation to Latin guidance and North American cooperation. The process was well underway by 1950 and was to be enforced about 1953. The second South American Baháʼí Congress was celebrated in Santiago, Chile, in January, 1948 with Uruguayan delegate Gambeta Roldan. When the regional national assembly of South America was elected the members included Rangvald Taetz of Uruguay. By 1950 there was still the one assembly in Uruguay. In 1956 the Baháʼís of Montevideo hosted the sixth convention to elect the regional assembly of South America. The regional assembly was reorganized in 1957 to be made up of Chile, Argentina, Uruguay, Paraguay & Bolivia; one member was Roberto Cazcarra of Montevideo. In early 1958 the Baháʼís of Montevideo held their first summer school and in the fall of 1959 eighteen Baháʼís gathered for a conference to discuss the progress of the religion in Uruguay. In December 1959 the Montevideo newspaper El País covered a presentation on Israel, which mentioned the Baháʼí Faith. In spring 1960 Hand of the Cause William Sears visited the Baháʼís in Minas. In late 1960 the secretary of the regional assembly, Chilean Salvador Tormo, died in a plane crash in Uruguay. In 1961 each country of the regional assembly elected its own National Spiritual Assembly - Uruguay's was witnessed by Hand of the Cause, ʻAlí-Akbar Furútan. The members of the first Uruguayan national assembly were: Leopolda Caraballo, Else Cazcarra, Roberto Cazcarra, Mary Dutra, Francisco Flores, Elena Caraballo, Mario Regina Marius, Carola Escofet, and Edward Belcher. By 1963 there were Local Spiritual Assemblies also in Maldonado, and Minas, and a smaller group in Juan Lacaze (see List of cities in Uruguay.)

== Modern community ==
The contributions of the community were noted in 1995 when three Uruguayan senators urged a favorable vote supporting the human rights of Iran's Baháʼís, saying: "A vote in this sense will not only be in accordance with the country's tradition, but shall encourage the members of this community to continue their benevolent work within Uruguay and the rest of the world."

There have been some well known Baha'is who have lived in Uruguay. In 1968 Alfredo Speranza, an Uruguayan pianist who's given concerts in Uruguay and other countries, became a member of the religion. In 2004, Uruguayan artist Sima Baher was invited to exhibit her art by the embassy of Uruguay in Argentina at the Borges Cultural Center. In 1984, Phil Sisson left New York City and traveled to South America where he served as a Baháʼí pioneer. His first recording, "The Dream" was recorded in Montevideo and featured Baha'i chants of the Hidden Words by Baha'u'llah, prayers and meditations, and original songs. Sisson also toured throughout the region with Raul Medina, and hosted his own television show called "Oro Solido" on Uruguayan national TV and throughout Río de la Plata, was guest performer on Telecataplum (see Canal 12), and performed at La Allianaza, was a featured guest artist in the "Miss Hawaiian Tropic Beauty Pageant in Punta del Este", and was invited to perform at the Israeli Embassy in Montevideo. Sisson married Lena Hedayatzadeh in 1989, two years after adopting Lua Aline who (in 2004) served for three months at the Baha'i Lotus Temple in New Delhi, India. – "Her service was the sweetest affirmation and compliment she could have ever bestowed upon us." In 2006, Sisson released his second recording, "We're One People" in San Diego, California.

There have also been activities noted among the community in general. Baháʼís from Uruguay pioneered to the Falkland Islands and Brazil. Summer schools held in Uruguay showed 87 attendees in 1985 and 93 in 1987, when Baháʼís were believed to live in 96 locations in Uruguay. By 1988 a community of Baháʼís was to be found in Maldonado. In 1989 the Baháʼís of Montevideo hosted two events; under the auspices of the national assembly the first was an international women's conference attracting about 300 people from 12 countries. and second, held through the work of the local assembly, was an "Evening of Cultural Integration" brought together representatives from Armenian, African, and Israeli ethnicities including cultural forms of dress and talks on integrating into Uruguayan community. Fifty-five members of the religion from Uruguay joined those from across Brazil and other places for a 2008 regional conference called for by the Universal House of Justice in São Paulo.

=== Demographics ===
By 2001 there was an estimated 4,000 Baháʼís, about 0.2% of the national population according to the World Christian Database, concentrated primarily in Montevideo. The Association of Religion Data Archives (relying on World Christian Encyclopedia) estimated some 7,300 Baháʼís in 2005.

== See also ==
- Religion in Uruguay
- History of Uruguay
