= List of universities in Uruguay =

In Uruguay—according to article 4 of Executive Decree 104/014—there are two types of higher education institutions:

- those engaged in teaching, research and extension to three or more unrelated subject areas, which use the name "university" (universidad in Spanish)
- those engaged in teaching, research and extension in one or more related subject areas, or in two unrelated, which are referred to as "university institute" (instituto universitario in Spanish)

== Introduction ==
During most of Uruguay's history, the University of the Republic predominated as the only university, whose founding process began in 1833 with the bill of the priest Damaso Antonio Larrañaga, the Oribe's decree of May 27, 1838 and the decree of 1849 that founded the UdelaR. In the same century, through executive decree of January 26, 1876, the Liceo de Estudios Universitarios was authorized with legal effects as university courses, thereby becoming in 1878 the Universidad Libre, later named Universidad Católica. This institution was closed in 1886 due to financial problems and legal issues. After this, only the University of the Republic remained for a long time.

At the end of the Civic-military dictatorship of Uruguay in 1984, the Executive branch passed Decree 343/984 in which the operation of the Catholic University of Uruguay was authorized (being this its refounding), and here began a shift "from a one-university system to a system of universities", in which coexist both public and private universities. Subsequently, Decree-Law 15,661 (Note: A Decree-Law, in general, is a rule having the force of law, issued by the Executive with no intervention or prior authorization of Congress or Parliament. There were various types, among them those in under certain cases, pursuant to urgent reasons which prevent obtain approval for a Legislative Decree, and require validation by the Legislative when the urgent reason cease. Other type of Decree-Law are rules issued by military governments, ignoring the Constitution.) of October 29, 1984 validates university degrees issued by private universities with the same legal effects as those issued by the University of the Republic, which have been approved by the Executive and registered to Ministry of Education and Culture. These Decree-Law and Decree mentioned above (as were issued by unconstitutional organs) were validated by the Law of validity of acts of the military dictatorship government. In 1995, proceedings by which institutions can access the official recognition were established, through Executive Decree 308/995. This last regulatory decree was abrogated by Decree 104/014, which becomes the regulatory of the aforementioned Decree-Law.

== Universities ==
Public:

University name		Acronym	Founded	HQ	Locations	Enrollment
English	Spanish	Acronym	Founded	HQ	Locations	Enrollment
University of the Republic	Universidad de la República	UDELAR	1849	Montevideo	CURE (Maldonado, Rocha, Treinta y Tres, Paysandú, Rivera, Salto, Tacuarembó	108,886 (2012)
Technological University of Uruguay	Universidad Tecnológica del Uruguay	UTEC	2012	Montevideo	Colonia, Durazno, Paysandú, Río Negro, Rivera	

Private:

University name						
English		Acronym	Founded	HQ	Locations	Enrollment
ORT University	Universidad ORT Uruguay	ORT	1942	Montevideo	—N/a	7,511 (2012)
University of the Enterprise	Universidad de la Empresa	UDE		Montevideo	—N/a	3,475 (2012)
Catholic University	Universidad Católica	UCUDAL		Montevideo	Punta del Este, Salto	9,478 (2012)
University of Montevideo	Universidad de Montevideo	UM	1986	Montevideo	—N/a	2,222 (2012)
Latin American Center for Human Economy	Centro Latinoamericano de Economía Humana.	CLAEH	1957	Montevideo	Tacuarembó, Punta del Este	

== Rankings ==
Institution	QS World		QS Latin		URAP		SIR Iberoamerican Ranking 2012		SIR Iberoamerican Ranking 2015	
Institution	2014	2015	2014	2015	2013	2014	IBE	LAT	IBE	LAT
Universidad de la República	701	701	54	56	829	850	70	32	72	35
Universidad Tecnológica del Uruguay	—N/a	—N/a	—N/a	—N/a	—N/a	—N/a	—N/a	—N/a	—N/a	—N/a
Universidad ORT Uruguay	—N/a	—N/a	—N/a	81	—N/a	—N/a	572	467	425	339
Universidad de la Empresa	—N/a	—N/a	—N/a	—N/a	—N/a	—N/a	1081	947	520	433
Universidad Católica	—N/a	—N/a	—N/a	88	—N/a	—N/a	472	375	424	338
Universidad de Montevideo	651	651	96	56	—N/a	—N/a	714	599	469	382

== See also ==
- Education in Uruguay
