= Latin American Center for Human Economy =

- Centro Latinoamericano de Economía Humana
- Type: Private
- Established: 1957
- President: Adolfo Pérez Piera
- Rector: Carlos de Cores Helguera
- Location: (Uruguay) Montevideo, Uruguay
- Campus: Urban
- Website: universidad.claeh.edu.uy

The Latin American Center for Human Economy (Spanish: Centro Latinoamericano de Economía Humana, sometimes CLAEH) is a Uruguayan non-profit organization and university founded in 1957. Based in Montevideo, its doctrinal inspiration comes from the current of Economics and Humanism, promoted since the 1940s by the Breton Dominican priest Louis-Joseph Lebret on Économie et humanisme, which affirms the values of the human person, solidarity and commitment to social change at the service of development.

== History ==
In October 1997, 50 years after its foundation, CLAEH was officially recognized as a University Institute, and in 2017, the Ministry of Education and Culture recognized it as a University.

== Schools ==
- School of Medicine (Punta del Este Campus)
- School of Culture (Punta del Este Campus)
- Law School (Punta del Este Campus)

=== Undergraduate courses ===
- Law School
  - Attorney-at-Law
  - Notary Public
- School of Medicine
  - Doctor of Medicine
- School of Culture
  - Bachelor of Cultural Management

=== Postgraduate courses ===
- School of Medicine
  - Postgraduate Course in Traumatology
  - Postgraduate course in Hematology
- School of Culture
  - Specialization in Art History and Heritage

=== Masters' degrees ===
- School of Education
  - Master of Teaching of Mathematics for Initial and Primary Level
  - Master of Educational Technology
  - Master of Didactics of Higher Education
  - Master of Teaching of Secondary Education
  - Master of Education Policy and Management
- School of Health
  - Master of Health Services Management
  - Master of Health Policy and Management

== See also ==
- List of universities in Uruguay
