= .uy =

Internet country code top-level domain for Uruguay

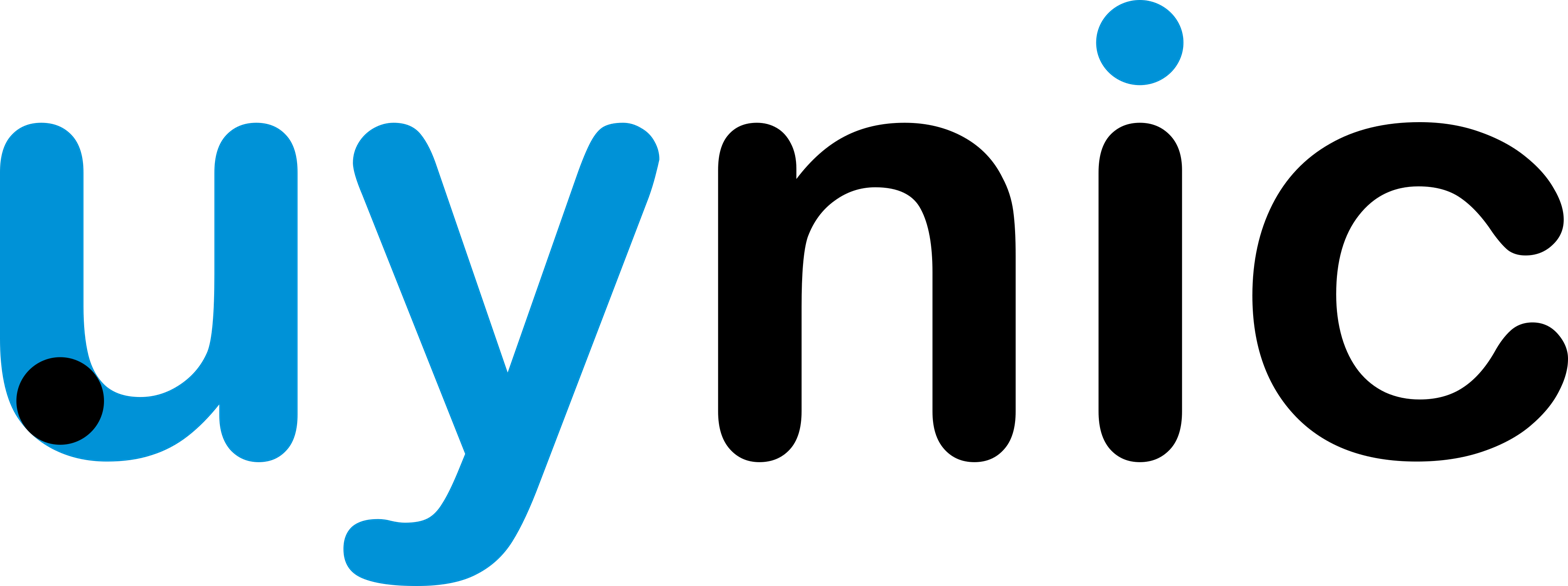
- Introduced: 10 September 1990
- TLD type: Country code top-level domain
- Status: Active
- Registry: Servicio Central de Informatica
- Sponsor: Universidad de la República
- Intended use: Entities connected with Uruguay
- Actual use: Very popular in Uruguay
- Structure: Registrations are at the second level or at third level beneath various second-level names
- Documents: Rules
- Dispute policies: Arbitration
- Registry website: .uy NIC

.uy is the Internet country code top-level domain (ccTLD) for Uruguay. Domain names can be registered at second-level or at third-level. As of 11 June 2012, second level .uy registrations are possible.

== Second-level domains ==
- .com.uy: for commercial companies (a local billing contact is required for foreign registrants).
- .edu.uy: for local educational entities.
- .gub.uy: for local governmental entities.
- .net.uy: for local Internet service providers.
- .mil.uy: for the Armed Forces of Uruguay.
- .org.uy: for non-profit organisations.

== Management ==
The Servicio Central de Informática (SeCIU, Central Computing Service) of the University of the Republic has been the responsible authority for managing and registering domains under .uy and its subdomains since April 1990, delegated by IANA through InterNIC. The domains under .com.uy are managed and registered by Antel via its website dominiosuy (nic.com.uy) instead. Domains directly under .uy can be registered directly at SeCIU or after the registrar entities it authorized, being Antel and other private companies.
