= ANTEL =

Government-owned telecommunications company in Uruguay

Administración Nacional de Telecomunicaciones

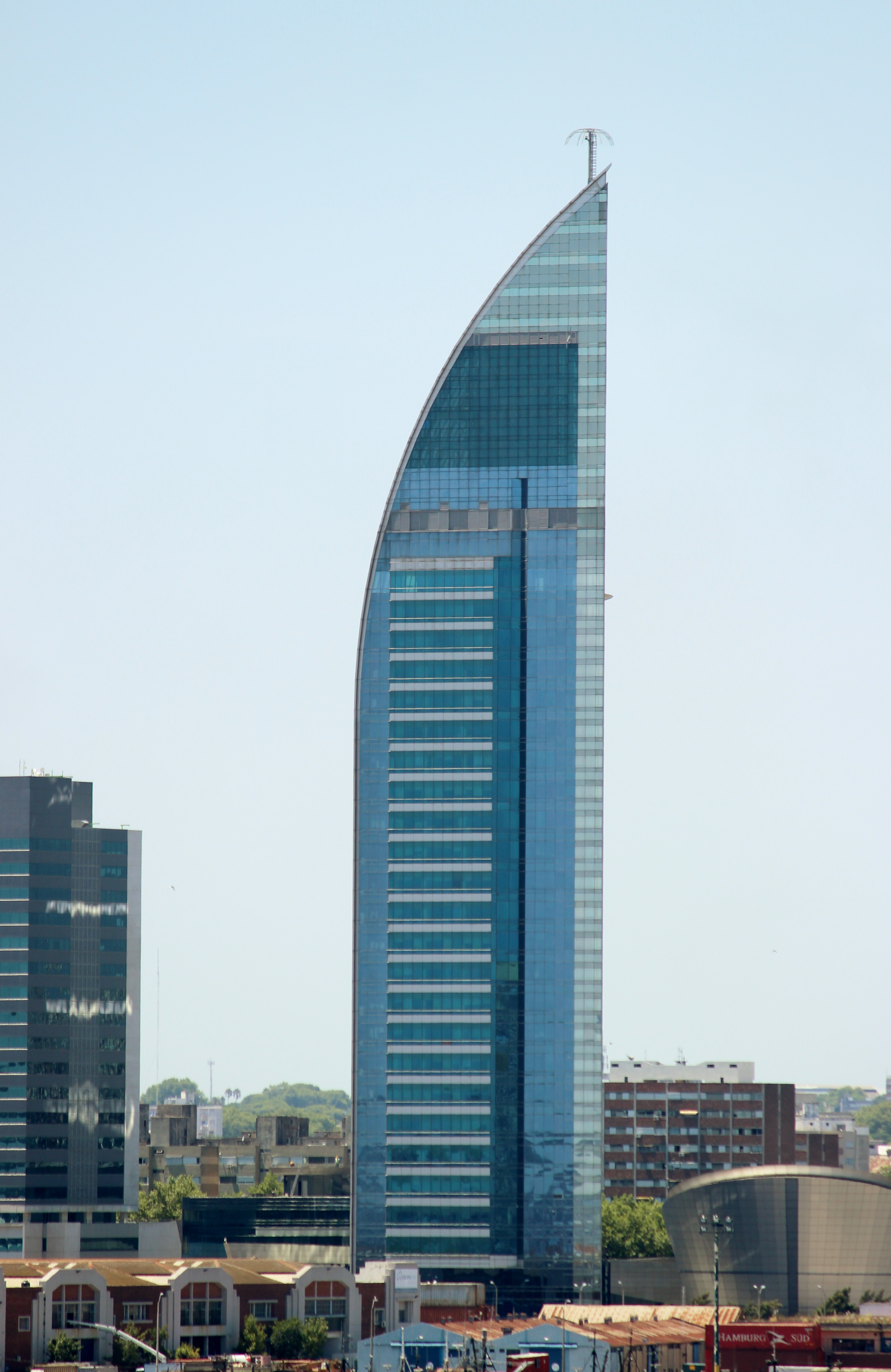
- Telecommunications Tower in Montevideo
- Type: State-owned
- Genre: Telecommunications
- Founded: 1974; 52 years ago (spun off from UTE)
- Headquarters: Montevideo, Uruguay
- Area served: Worldwide
- Key people: Alejandro Paz (President)
- Revenue: US$1.1 billion (FY2023)
- Owner: Government of Uruguay
- Number of employees: 5,050 (2023)
- Divisions: Antel Moviles, Antel Datos e Internet
- Website: www.antel.com.uy

The Administración Nacional de Telecomunicaciones (ANTEL, literally "National Administration of Telecommunications") is Uruguay's government-owned telecommunications company, founded in 1974 as a separate legal entity after spinning off the telecommunications division of UTE, which had the monopoly of landline telephony since 1931. The company has a monopoly of landline telephony and data services in the country. They also provide mobile phone services (in direct competition with Claro and Movistar) and Internet-related services, being the only provider of ADSL and land-line data services because of the monopoly situation.

== History ==
In 1992, under the presidency of Luis Alberto Lacalle, a privatization of all government-owned companies was attempted. However, a later referendum revoked the privatization law, Pluna being the only company to be successfully privatized to Varig. Antel enjoys a monopoly on land lines in Uruguay, including voice-only lines as well as DSL and fiber internet.

In 2015, it took over Ancel, which had previously been a standalone cell service provider.

Antel started deploying fiber to the home in Montevideo in 2012, aiming to switch 240,000 clients that year with a cost of US$180 million. Previous DSL subscribers keep their contract, or may switch to faster Internet Vera plans: 150/12 Mbit/s for US$72/month, 120/12 Mbit/s for $61/month, 60/10 Mbit/s for $49/month, or 30/4 Mbit/s for $32/month, throttled back to 10% of those speeds after a 700 / 350 / 400 / 150 GB cap. IP television, voice over IP and connections in the department capitals are expected for 2013 and 2014.

== Telecommunications tower ==
ANTEL owns Uruguay's tallest skyscraper, the Telecommunications Tower, which has 160 meters and 35 floors. It is the tallest building in the country. It was designed by architect Carlos Ott. It is situated by the side of Montevideo's bay.

== Satellite telecommunications ==
Uruguay installed its first satellite earth station in 1985 followed by two Intelsat earth stations in 1990. ANTEL, the Aeronautics and Space Research and Diffusion Center and the UdelaR launched the first national satellite for telecommunications in June 2014, the Antelsat.

== Private competition ==
Antel has been granted monopoly power over most forms of communication carriage to consumers in Uruguay, clearly constraining the communication offerings by private companies:

Uruguay communications offerings (as of February 2024)
Service	Antel offering	Private offerings
Wireless Internet	Yes	Yes
Wireless Telephone (mobile)	Yes	Yes
Wireless Telephone (fixed)	Yes	Forbidden
Wireless Broadcast TV	No	Yes
Internet over landline (ADSL)	Yes	Forbidden
Telephone over landline	Yes	Forbidden
Broadcast TV over landline	No	Forbidden
Internet over coax cable	No	Yes
Telephone over coax cable	No	Forbidden
Broadcast TV over coax cable	Yes	Yes
Internet over fiber	Yes	Forbidden
Telephone over fiber	Yes	Forbidden
Broadcast TV over fiber	Yes	Forbidden

There are two notable communication technologies that have shown potential for increased private participation in recent years:

=== Internet over cable ===
In early August 2016 the Uruguayan supreme court issued a ruling in favor of cable TV company Monte Cablevideo S.A, declaring unconstitutional the law that made it unlawful for cable TV companies to offer Internet service. If this stood, it would represent an historic opening of the hitherto rigidly controlled Uruguayan wired Internet market, a sort of fall of the Berlin Wall in Uruguayan telecom. It would mean that for the first time in Uruguayan history consumers would have a choice of providers when ordering wired Internet service. It would also mean that Uruguay would join the almost unanimous majority of nations in the Americas where cable-delivered Internet is on the menu of Internet access choices (Cuba would be the only remaining holdout.) At the end of August 2016 the supreme court issued a second similar ruling on the same matter, this time authorizing a different cable company - Nuevo Siglo - to provide the services in question (the Uruguayan legal system does not make the ruling in favor of a company apply to all other companies in that situation.) Nevertheless, for almost 7 years after those supreme court rulings cable TV companies continued to be precluded by the government from offering Internet services in Uruguay. But in June 2022 the government of Luis Lacalle Pou announced it would authorize selected cable companies to start providing Internet service, a historical reversal which would effectively bust Antel's erstwhile monopoly on wired Internet services. Indeed, in September 2023 three cable companies (TCC, Montecable and Nuevo Siglo) started offering Internet service in the La Blanqueada neighborhood of Montevideo.

=== Starlink ===
Most of Uruguay's landmass is rural and there are remote locations where Internet service is not currently available. As of February 2024 Starlink was already approved and available in most of South America's landmass, including Brazil, Chile, Paraguay, Perú, Colombia and Ecuador During a 20 March press conference, Argentina announced that it was approving the system as well. Two days later the Uruguayan government quickly followed suit announcing its approval. Thus Uruguay basically repeated the "last democracy to sign up" (Venezuela thus excluded) performance it displayed in approving cable Internet service (see above.) Antel's labor union (Sutel) went on the record opposing the approval of Starlink, as it opposed the abovementioned Internet over cable service.

In December 2023 the Uruguayan government had approved the operation of Amazon's Kuiper satellite service, but only for sale of Internet services to corporations. As of that date Amazon hadn't launched any production satellites and thus in practice had no Internet service to offer.

For information on specific competitors to Antel in the services where competition is allowed, see Telecommunications in Uruguay

== Financial performance ==
The medium-term track record of Antel's finances when looked at in constant dollars is one of slightly decreasing revenue, slightly increasing profit, and generous profit margins all around. In 2011 Antel had revenues of US$899,362,000 and net profits of US$155,630,000 (17.3% profit margin.) In 2023 Antel had revenues of US$1,131,410,000 and net profits of US$245,312,000 (22% profit margin.) The nominal revenue growth in dollars over those 12 years was 26%, but accounting for dollar inflation (38%) in that period that turns into a 9% decrease in revenues. The nominal profit growth in dollars over those 12 years was 57%; accounting for dollar inflation that still amounts to a positive 13% increase in profits.

To put Antel's profitability in context its rich 2023 net profit margin of 22% puts it in the league of highly profitable companies like Google (24% net margin as of December 31, 2023), and clearly separates it from comparable US communication companies like AT&T (11.76% net margin as of December 31, 2023.)

It is hard to overstate Antel's size in the Uruguayan economy. Antel's 2023 revenue was 1.6% of Uruguay's GDP. A comparable US company in terms of that ratio would be ExxonMobil, the number 3 US company by revenue.

As was (and in some countries like Uruguay still is) the case with state-owned telecom monopolies, Antel performs a significant revenue collection role for the Uruguayan state. Antel's 2023 gross profit amounts to 0.44% of Uruguayan GDP. If hypothetically the company lowered its prices to reduce its profit to zero the state's coffers would be 0.44% of GDP poorer and the Uruguayan population that depends on Antel services would be 0.44% of GDP richer.

== Controversies ==
Antel has been involved in high profile and somewhat controversial investments, notably a) the purchase of the Telecommunications Tower (Montevideo), the most expensive corporate headquarters in Uruguay for US$102,000,000 and b) more recently (April 2013) the announcement of a planned investment of US$40,000,000 in a sports arena.

In 2020, the LGBT film festival Llamale H sued Antel because the company didn't allow the storage of the festival contents, alleging that they don't fit the values of the company. The LGBT collective denounced discriminatory behavior by Antel.
