= Public holidays in Uruguay =

The following are public holidays in Uruguay.

Date	English name	Spanish name	Remarks	Non-working day
January 1	New Year's Day	Año Nuevo		Yes
January 6	Children's Day	Día de los Niños	In place of Epiphany (Día de Reyes).	No
moveable in late February or early March	Carnival	Carnaval		No
moveable in late March or early April	Tourism Week	Semana de Turismo	In place of Christian Holy Week (Semana Santa).	No
April 19	Landing of the 33 Patriots Day	Desembarco de los 33 Orientales		No
May 1	International Workers' Day	Día de los Trabajadores		Yes
May 18	Battle of Las Piedras	Batalla de las Piedras		No
June 19	Birthday of José Gervasio Artigas	Natalicio de Artigas		No
July 18	Constitution Day	Jura de la Constitución	To commemorate the promulgation of the First Constitution of Uruguay in 1830.	Yes
August 25	Independence Day	Declaratoria de la Independencia	From the Empire of Brazil in 1825.	Yes
October 12	Day of the Americas	Día de las Américas	In place of Columbus Day	No
November 2	All Souls' Day	Día de los Difuntos	In place of All Souls' Day	No
December 25	Family Day	Día de la Familia	In place of Christmas Day (Navidad).	Yes

Only 11 of these holidays imply a mandatory paid leave for workers. The remaining holidays are generally observed by schools, public sector offices, banks, and a few private companies.

== Moveable holidays ==
According to Uruguayan Law 16,805 with modifications of Law 17,414, the holidays declared by law, subject to the commemoration of them, follow the following scheme (whose commemoration as “moveable holidays”):

- If coincide on Saturday, Sunday or Monday will be observed in those days.
- If occur on Tuesday or Wednesday, will be observed on Monday immediately preceding.
- If occur on Thursday or Friday shall be observed on the Monday immediately following

This will not occur with Carnival and Tourism Week, and corresponding to January 1 and 6, May 1, June 19, July 18, August 25, November 2 and December 25, which will continue watching on the day of the week that may occur, whatever the same.
