= Islam in Uruguay =

Uruguay is a Christian majority country, with Islam being a minority religion. Due to the secular nature of Uruguay's constitution, Muslims are free to proselytize and build places of worship in the country.

The statistics for Islam in Uruguay estimate a total Muslim population of 700–1,500, representing 0.1 percent of the population by the USCIRF Report-2022.

A significant Muslim population lives in Chuy, near the Brazilian border, as well as Rivera, Artigas and Montevideo.

== Mosques & Islamic Centers ==
There is limited number of Mosques and Islamic centers in Uruguay:

1. Musallah Al Haazimi(mosque)
2. Egyptian Cultural Islamic Center
3. Islamic center of Uruguay
4. Centro Islamico Del Uruguay
5. Fraternidad Islámica del Uruguay

== Distribution ==
The majority of Muslims live in the eastern Uruguayan department of Rocha, in the city of Chuy, as well as in the cities of Rivera, Artigas, and Montevideo.

=== Palestinian Uruguayans ===
Palestinian Uruguayans (السطينيو أوروغواي) are Uruguayan citizens born in Palestine and residing in Uruguay. Approximately 5,000 Palestinians live mainly in the city of Chuí, which borders Chui city, which has a mosque and Islamic community in Brazil, and the rest in the city of Rivera. The majority of Palestinian Uruguayans are Muslims, with a minority being Christians.

=== Arab Uruguayans ===
Arab Uruguayans are mainly immigrants from the territory of present-day Lebanon (whose descendants may now number over 50,000). Uruguayan Arabs also include immigrants from other Arab countries, such as Egypt, Syria, Morocco, and Palestine. The majority of Uruguayan Arabs are Christian, with a minority being Muslim, and a small number being Jewish. About 500 Arabs live in the cities of Chui and Rivera on the border with Brazil.

== See also ==
- Latin American Muslims
- Latino Muslims
