= Rafael Tabárez =

Uruguayan footballer (born 1984)

Rafael Hugo Tabárez Hernández (born September 24, 1984 in Juan Lacaze) is a Uruguayan footballer currently playing for Progreso of the Primera División in Uruguay.

== Teams ==
- (Uruguay) Deportivo Colonia 2004
- (Argentina) Real Arroyo Seco 2005
- (Argentina) Rosario Puerto Belgrano de Punta Alta 2005
- (Uruguay) Durazno 2006-2007
- (Argentina) Platense 2008
- (Uruguay) Deportivo Colonia 2009
- (Argentina) Platense 2009-2010
- (China) Henan Jianye 2010
- (Argentina) Platense 2010-2011
- (Brazil) SC Rio Grande 2011
- (Uruguay) Progreso 2011–present
