= Martin Nusspaumer =

Uruguayan operatic tenor

Martín Nusspaumer
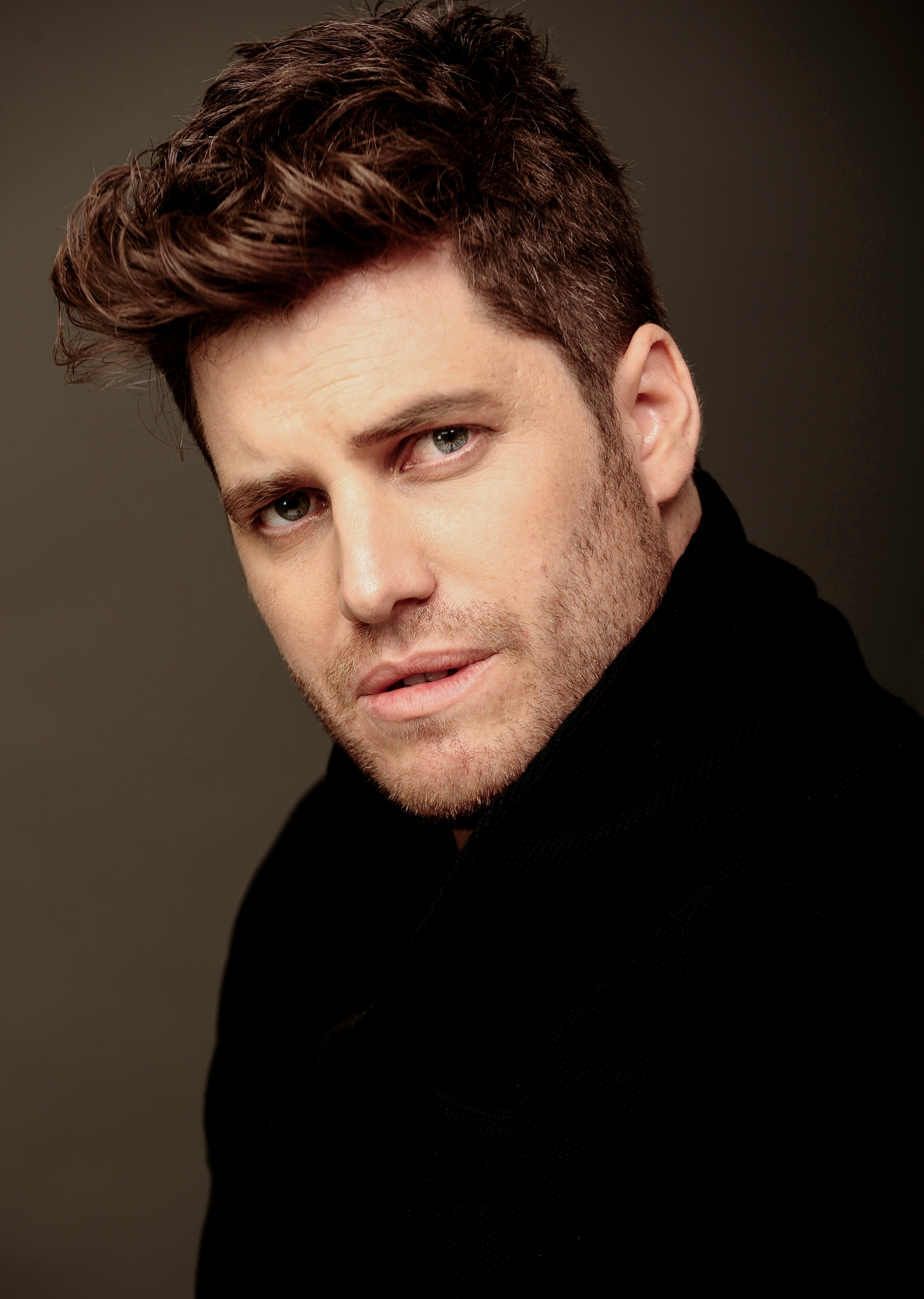

Background information
- Born: Juan Lacaze, Colonia, Uruguay
- Occupation: Opera singer

Martín Nusspaumer is a Uruguayan operatic tenor.

== Early life and education ==
Nusspaumer was born in Juan Lacaze, Uruguay. He studied in Montevideo at the Municipal School of Music and National School of Lyrical Art and received an artist diploma from the School of the Arts in Charleston, South Carolina. He graduated from the Florida Grand Opera's Young Artist Program and was a finalist in the Palm Beach Opera Vocal Competition and the Southern Region Auditions of the Metropolitan Opera.

== Career ==
Nusspaumer has performed as a soloist with orchestras and opera companies including Miami Symphony, Charleston Symphony, Ankara's Presidential Symphony Orchestra, Odessa Philharmonic, Orchestra Firenze, Philharmonic of Montevideo, the South Florida Symphony Orchestra and Istanbul Symphony Orchestra.

Nusspaumer has had principal roles in operas including La bohème, Carmen, Lucia di Lammermoor, La traviata, Madama Butterfly, Eugene Onegin, La battaglia di Legnano, Don Giovanni, "Thais, Nabucco, and L'elisir d'amore. He is also active in the zarzuela genre including Luisa Fernanda, La tabernera del puerto, Katiuska, la mujer rusa by Pablo Sorozábal, and Cecilia Valdés and has promoted this genre around the United States.

His performances have drawn accolades for powerful top notes, earning a reputation as a tenor with a clarion notes.

== Personal life ==
Nusspaumer resides in South Florida with his wife, mezzo-soprano María Antúnez, and daughter Amelia
