= Plaza de toros Real de San Carlos =

Derelict bull ring in Uruguay

Coordinates: 34.436527°S 57.865189°W

Real de San Carlos
- Plaza de Toros Real de San Carlos
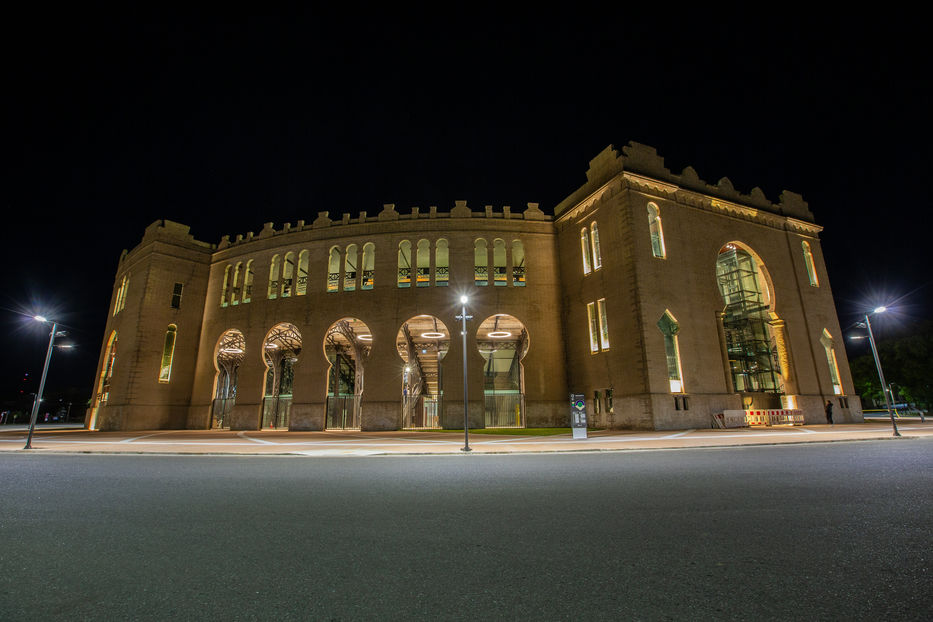
- The building at night.
- Interactive map of the Real de San Carlos area

General information
- Type: Bullring
- Architectural style: Moorish architecture
- Location: Colonia del Sacramento, Uruguay
- Construction started: 1909; 117 years ago
- Inaugurated: January 1910, 09; 116 years ago
- Renovated: 2020
- Cost: US$7,000,000

Height
- Height: 22 metres (72 ft)

Dimensions
- Diameter: 100 metres (330 ft)

Design and construction
- Architect: Josip Marković

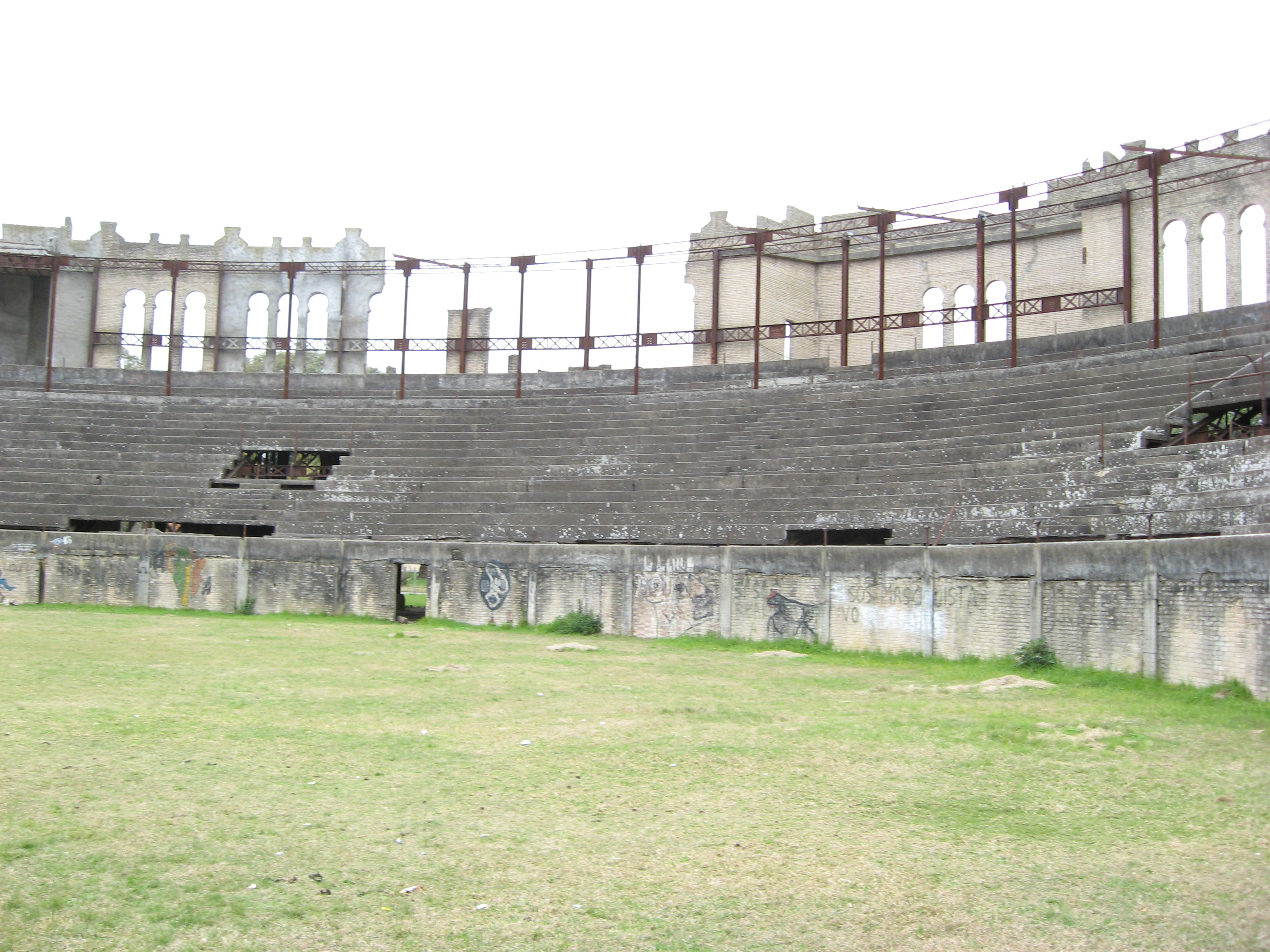
Inside the bullring

Plaza de toros Real de San Carlos is a former bullring in Colonia del Sacramento, Uruguay. Built in 1909 it was shortly closed after prohibition of bull fighting in 1912. After a century of abandonment, in 2021 it was finally restored and transformed into a cultural center for musical or sportive events.

== History ==
It officially opened on January 9, 1910, featuring the most famous Bullfighters of the time, Ricardo Torres (a.k.a. Bombita Grande) and his brother Manuel (a.k.a. Bombita Chico) from Spain.

Although originally scheduled to open on January 8, the opening was postponed as the owners feared they did not have the necessary comforts and services required for the event. Due to public uproar, mainly from Buenos Aires, they yielded to public demand and opened the following day to no less than 7,000 spectators.

The arena hosted a total of eight fights before bull fighting was prohibited by the Uruguayan national government in 1912.

When in operation it could host 10,000 spectators. It is designed in typically Moorish style.

The bull ring was part of a tourist complex including a jai alai court, a hotel, and racecourse. Currently only the racecourse is still in operation.

== Restoration ==
As of 2019, the bullring was restored and turned into a multi-complex.

== Gallery ==
=== Before restoration ===
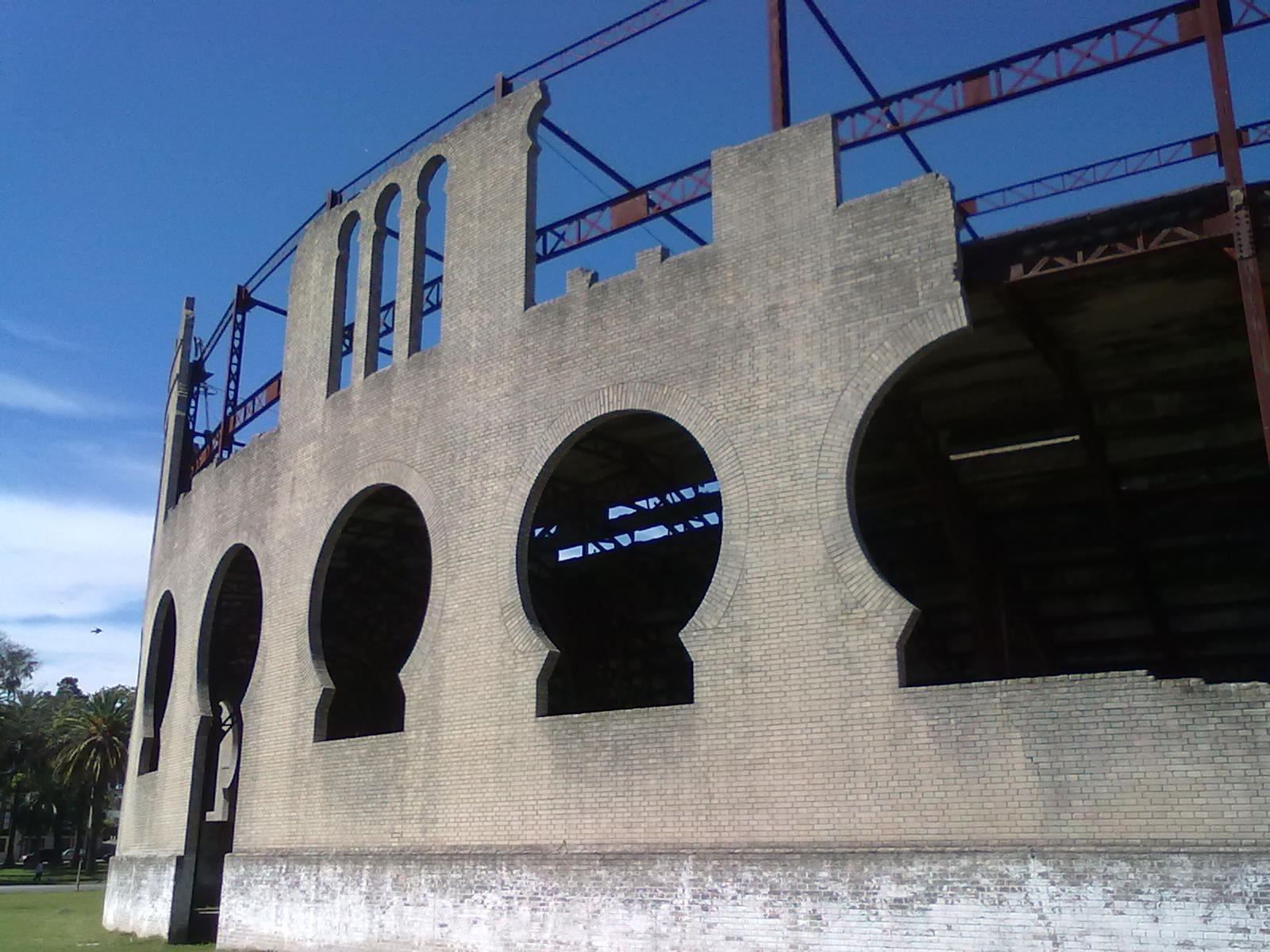

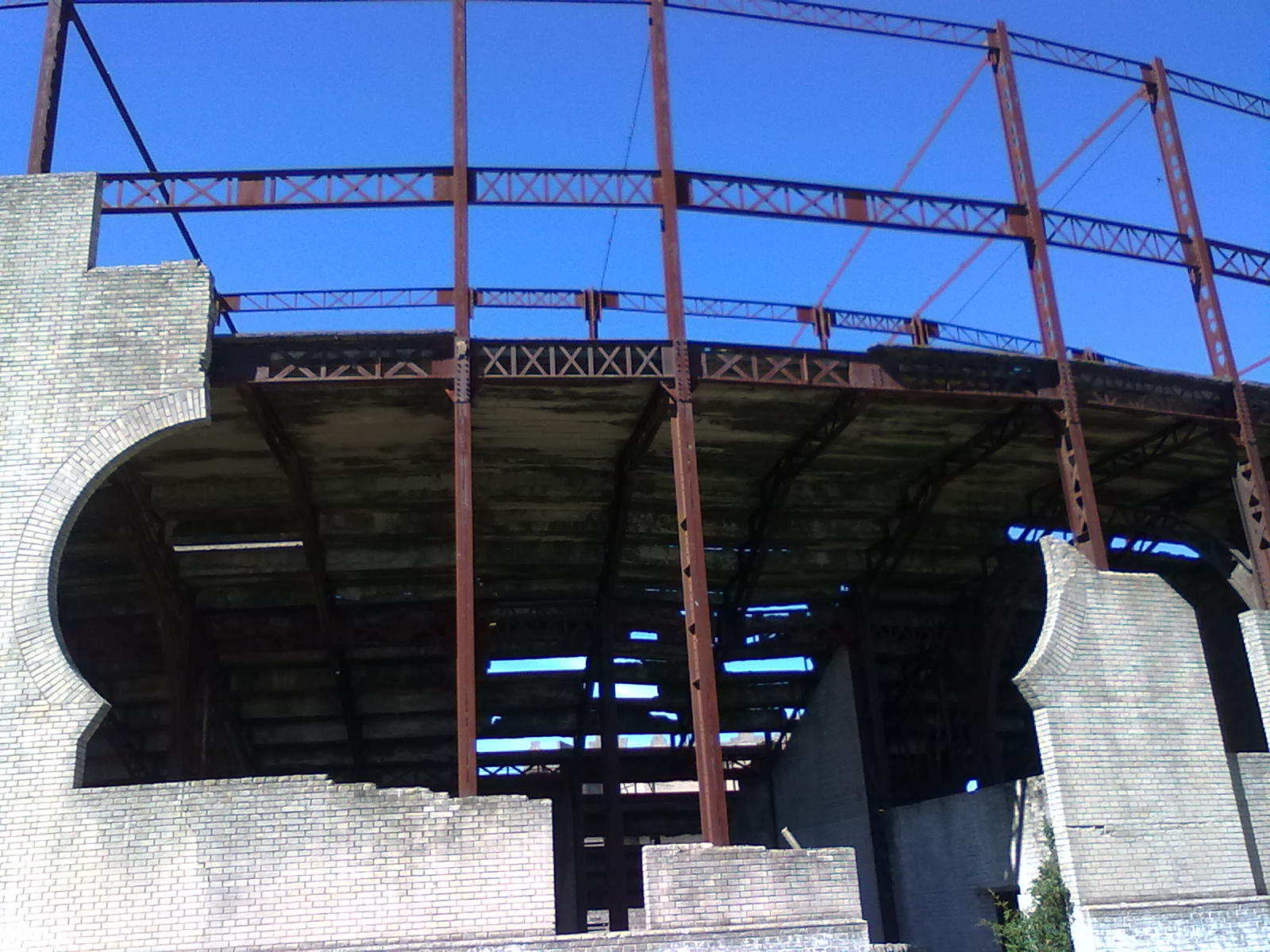

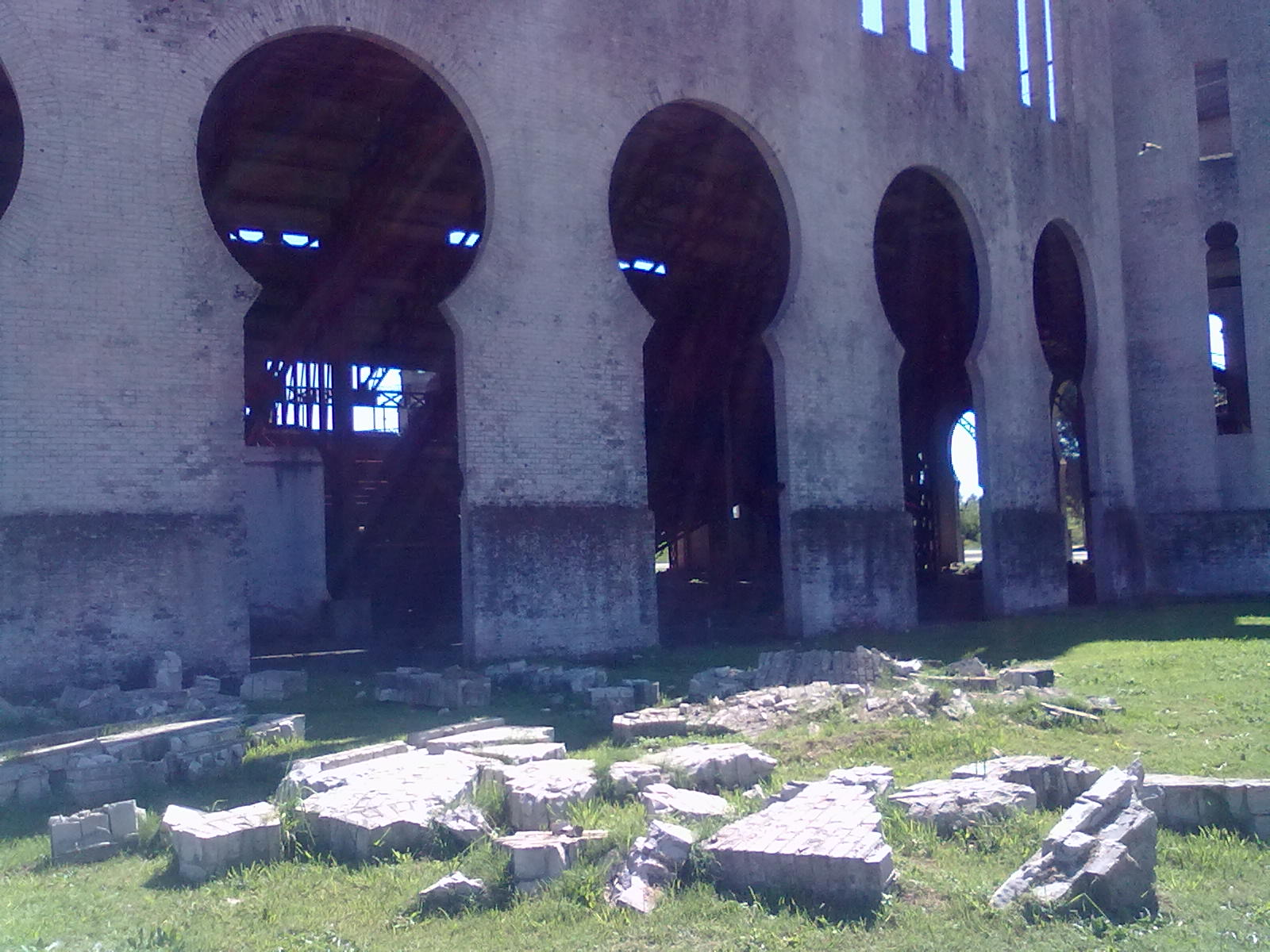

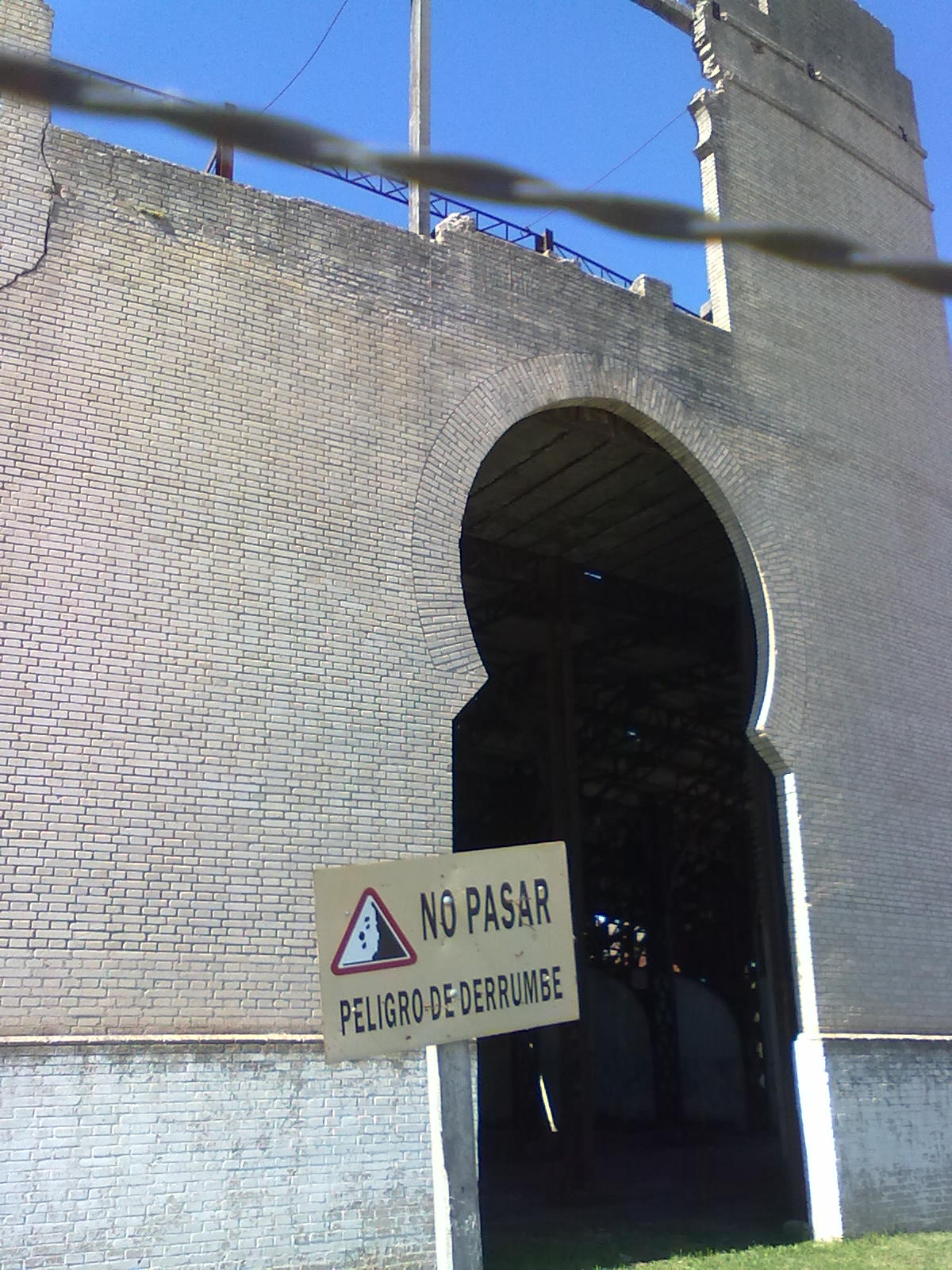
