= Colonia del Sacramento Lighthouse =

Lighthouse in Uruguay

Colonia del Sacramento lighthouse Faro de Colonia del Sacramento
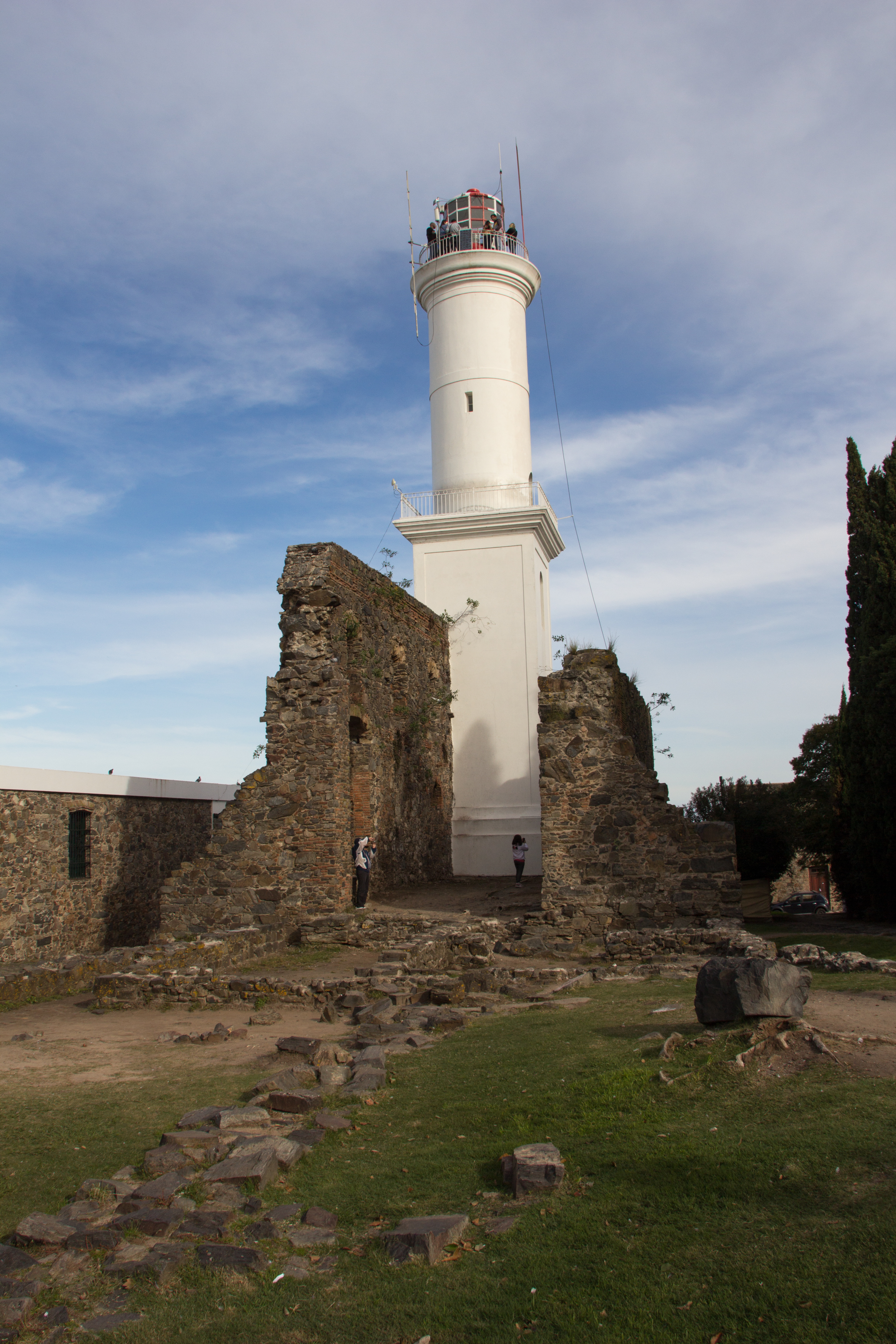
- Colonia del Sacramento lighthouse in 2016.
- Location: Historic Quarter; Colonia del Sacramento; Colonia Department; Uruguay
- Coordinates: 34°28′22.3″S 57°51′08.4″W

Tower
- Constructed: 1857
- Height: 26 metres (85 ft)
- Operator: National Navy of Uruguay
- Heritage: cultural heritage monument of Uruguay

Colonia del Sacramento Lighthouse (Spanish: Faro de Colonia del Sacramento) is a lighthouse located on the ruins of the Saint Francis Xavier convent in the historic district of Colonia del Sacramento, Colonia Department, Uruguay. It was erected in 1857.

== See also ==
- List of lighthouses in Uruguay
