= Pablo Acosta (footballer) =

Uruguayan footballer (born 1990)

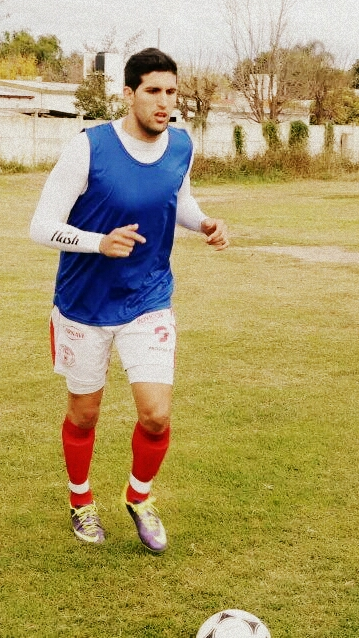
- Acosta in 2014

Personal information
- Full name: Pablo Emanuel Acosta Melo
- Date of birth: 30 December 1984 (age 41)
- Place of birth: Juan Lacaze, Uruguay
- Height: 1.84 m (6 ft 0 in)
- Position: Defender

Senior career*
| Years | Team | Apps | (Gls) |
| –2008 | Juventud Las Piedras | | |
| 2008–2009 | Oriental | | |
| 2010–2015 | Plaza Colonia | 78 | (2) |
| 2015–2016 | Deportes Melipilla | 30 | (0) |
- * Club domestic league appearances and goals

Pablo Emanuel Acosta Melo (born 30 December 1984) is a Uruguayan former professional footballer who played as a defender.

== Career ==
From 2010 to 2015, Acosta played for Plaza Colonia in his homeland. Previously, he played for Juventud Las Piedras and Oriental.

Besides Uruguay, Acosta played in Chile for Deportes Melipilla.
