= Basílica del Santísimo Sacramento, Colonia del Sacramento =

Coordinates: 34°28′4″S 57°51′12″W

Basílica del Santísimo Sacramento
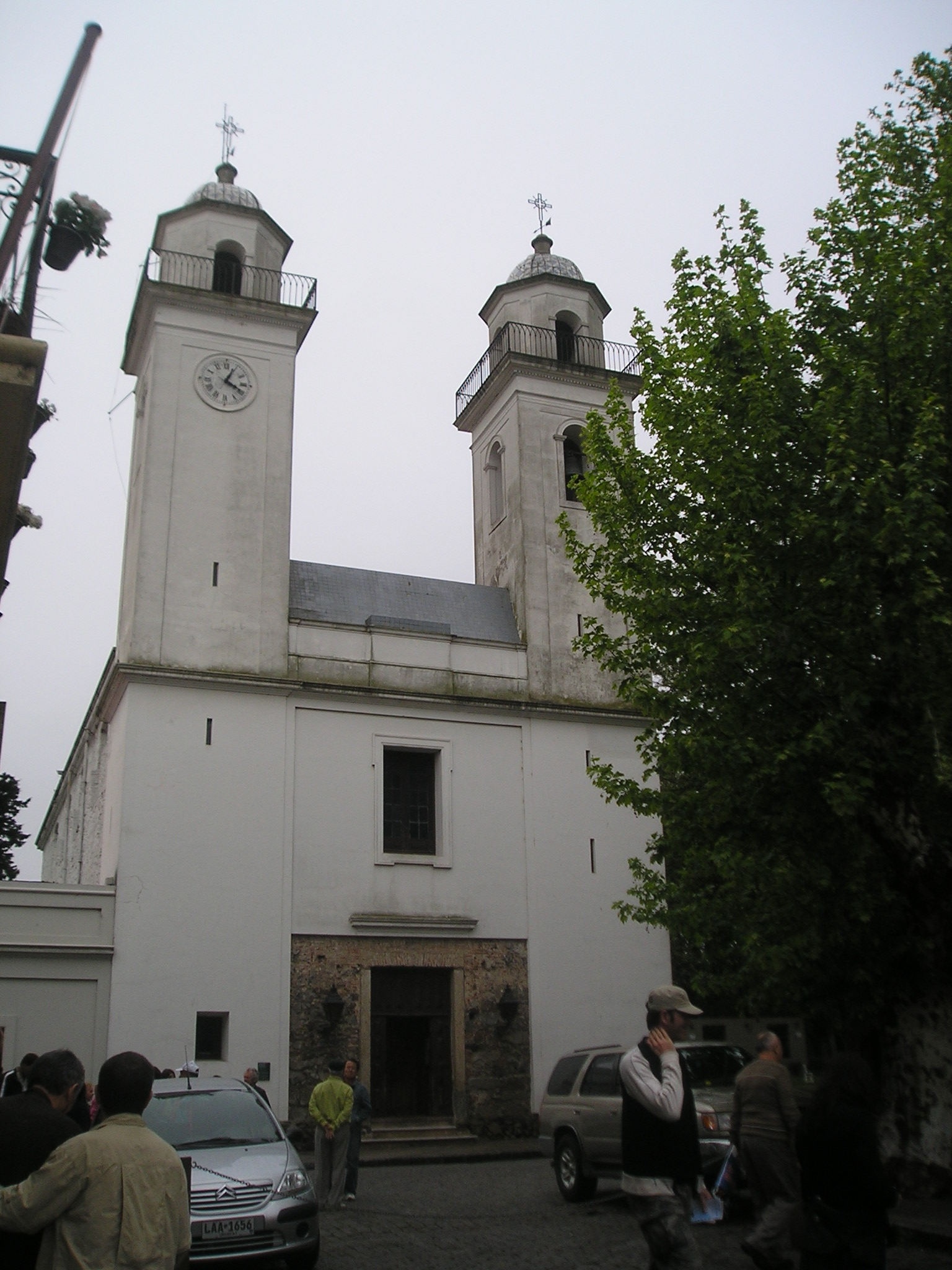

Religion
- Affiliation: Roman Catholic
- Ecclesiastical or organizational status: Parish church
- Year consecrated: 1680 / 1810 / 1841

Location
- Location: Vasconcellos 186; Colonia del Sacramento, Uruguay
- Interactive map of Basílica del Santísimo Sacramento

Architecture
- Type: Basilica minor
- UNESCO World Heritage Site
- Type: Cultural
- Criteria: iv
- Designated: 1995 (19th session)
- Parent listing: Historic Quarter of the City of Colonia del Sacramento
- Reference no.: 747
- State Party: Uruguay
- Region: Latin America

The Basilica of the Holy Sacrament (Spanish: Basílica del Santísimo Sacramento) is a Roman Catholic parish church in Colonia del Sacramento, Uruguay.

== History ==
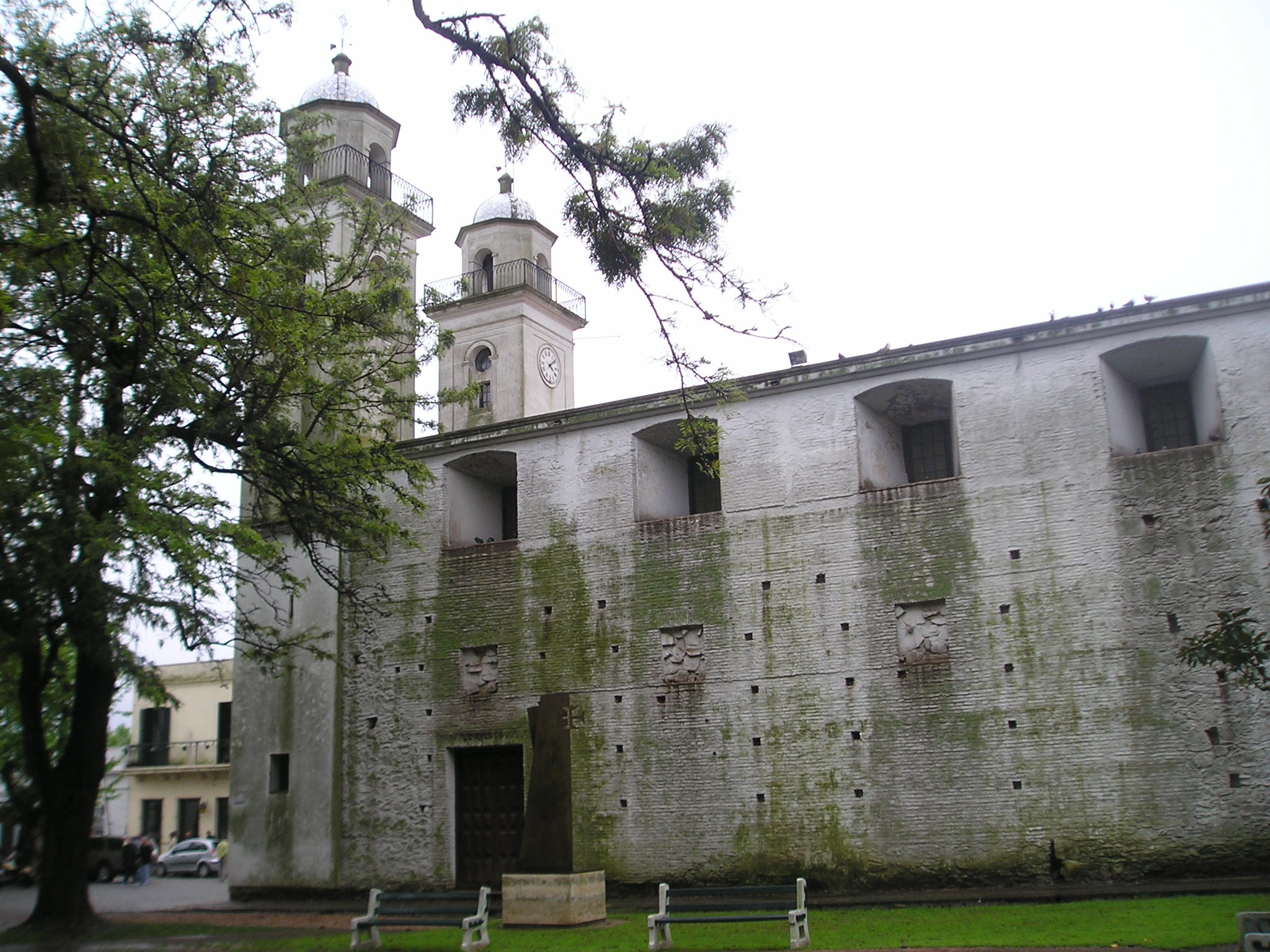
South view of Basílica del Santísimo Sacramento, Colonia del Sacramento

The parish was established on 2 February 1680, being one of the oldest in the country. The first church was a humble mud ranch. It is as old as the city itself (a former Portuguese settlement). The present church dates back to 1810, when it was built according to plans by Tomás Toribio; soon afterward a lightning storm destroyed the building, which was restored between 1836 and 1841. Finally, in 1976 a conceptual refurbishment took place. Architects José Terra Carve, Antonio Cravotto, and Miguel Ángel Odriozola worked on its restoration.

In 1995, the Historic Quarter of the City of Colonia del Sacramento was declared a World Heritage Site by UNESCO - with it, the Basilica.
