= Estadio Miguel Campomar =

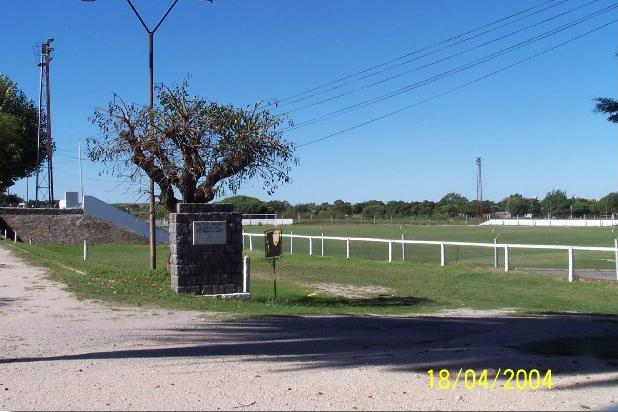
- Interactive map of Estadio Miguel Campomar
- Location: Juan Lacaze, Uruguay
- Coordinates: 34°25′33″S 57°26′39″W
- Capacity: 8,000
- Surface: grass

Tenant
- Deportivo Colonia

Estadio Miguel Campomar is a multi-use stadium in Juan Lacaze, Uruguay. It is currently used mostly for football matches and hosts the home matches of Deportivo Colonia. The stadium holds 8,000 people.
