= Siege of Colonia del Sacramento (1735–1737) =

- Part of the Spanish–Portuguese War (1735–1737)
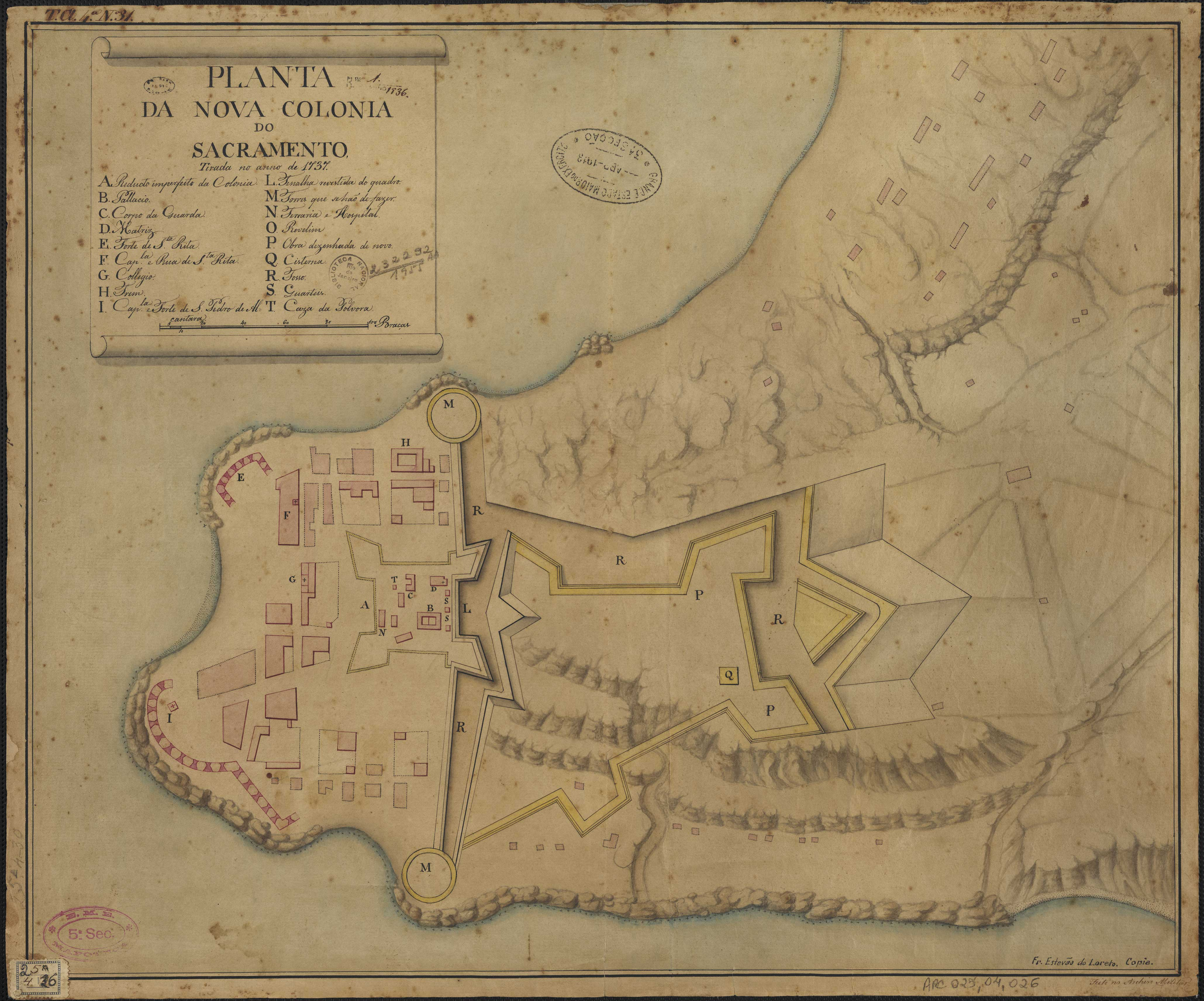
- 1737 Portuguese map of Colonia del Sacramento
Date	October 1735 – September 1737
Location	Colonia del Sacramento, Uruguay
Result	Inconclusive

Belligerents
(Kingdom of Portugal) Portugal	Spain

Commanders and leaders
(Kingdom of Portugal) António Pedro de Vasconcelos	(Spain) Miguel de Salcedo y Sierralta

Strength
840 men	4,300 men (including 3,000 Guaraní auxiliaries); 14 cannons 4 mortars

The siege of Colonia del Sacramento took place between October 1735 and September 1737, during the Spanish–Portuguese War (1735–1737).

== Siege ==
=== Action of 20 October 1735 ===
On 20 October 1735, two cavalry companies of 160 men under the command of Captain Inácio Pereira da Silva left the fortress and observed the movement of the Spanish army. Salcedo, who was at the vanguard, caught them and sent 600 men to fight them. The fight lasted until the night, and the Spaniards suffered heavy casualties.

On 9 December, the Spaniards fired 2,440 round shots and 66 bombs against the city, that opened a breach in the walls of the fortress. The Spaniards began to attack through the breach constantly, but without success.

On 16 March 1737, under influence of France, Great Britain and the Dutch Republic, a treaty was signed in Paris.

In September, the ship of the line Nossa Senhora da Boa Viagem, under the command of Duarte Pereira, arrived at Colonia del Sacramento with articles of the armistice. Vasconcelos sent the articles to the captain José Inácio de Almeida that sent them to Salcedo, ending the siege.
