= Calle de los Suspiros =

Street in Colonia del Sacramento, Uruguay

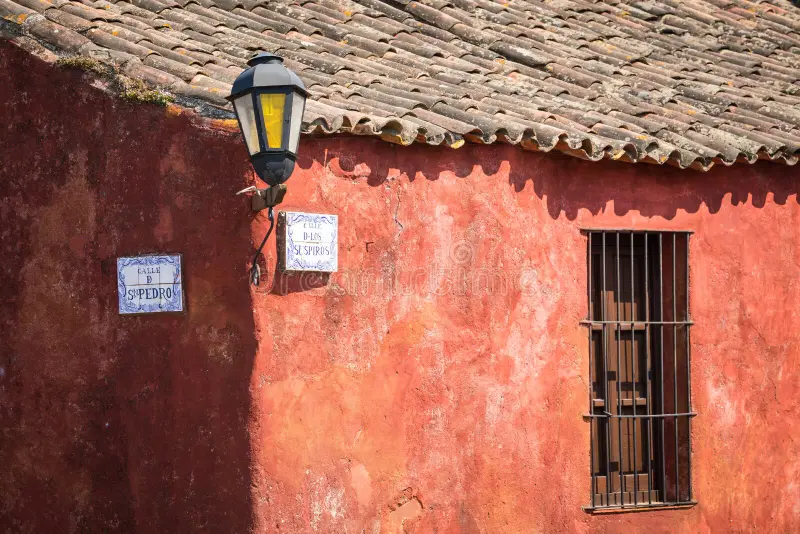

La Calle de los Suspiros ("Street of Sighs") is a historical street in Colonia del Sacramento, Uruguay. It is part of the city's Historic Quarter, which was listed as a World Heritage Site by UNESCO in 1995.
