= Deportivo Colonia =

Uruguayan football club

- Full name: Club Deportivo Colonia
- Nicknames: Colonienses, Lacasinos
- Founded: 16 October 1999
- Ground: Estadio Miguel Campomar; Juan Lacaze, Uruguay
- Capacity: 8,000
- Chairman: Mario Vidart
- Coach: Victor Cabrera
- League: Disaffiliated
- 2006–07: Segunda División Uruguay, withdrew
Home colours	Away colours

Club Deportivo Colonia, usually known simply as Deportivo Colonia or Depor Colonia, is a football club based in Colonia, Uruguay.

== Stadium ==
Their home field is Estadio Miguel Campomar, in Juan Lacaze.

== History ==
They played in the Uruguayan Second Division after being relegated from the Uruguayan First Division in the 2005/2006 season. They have been disaffiliated from Asociación Uruguaya de Fútbol due to no payment of debts before the 2nd division start in 2007.
