= Colonia del Sacramento =

Colonia del Sacramento Colônia do Sacramento (Brazilian Portuguese) Colónia do Sacramento (Portuguese)
- Capital city
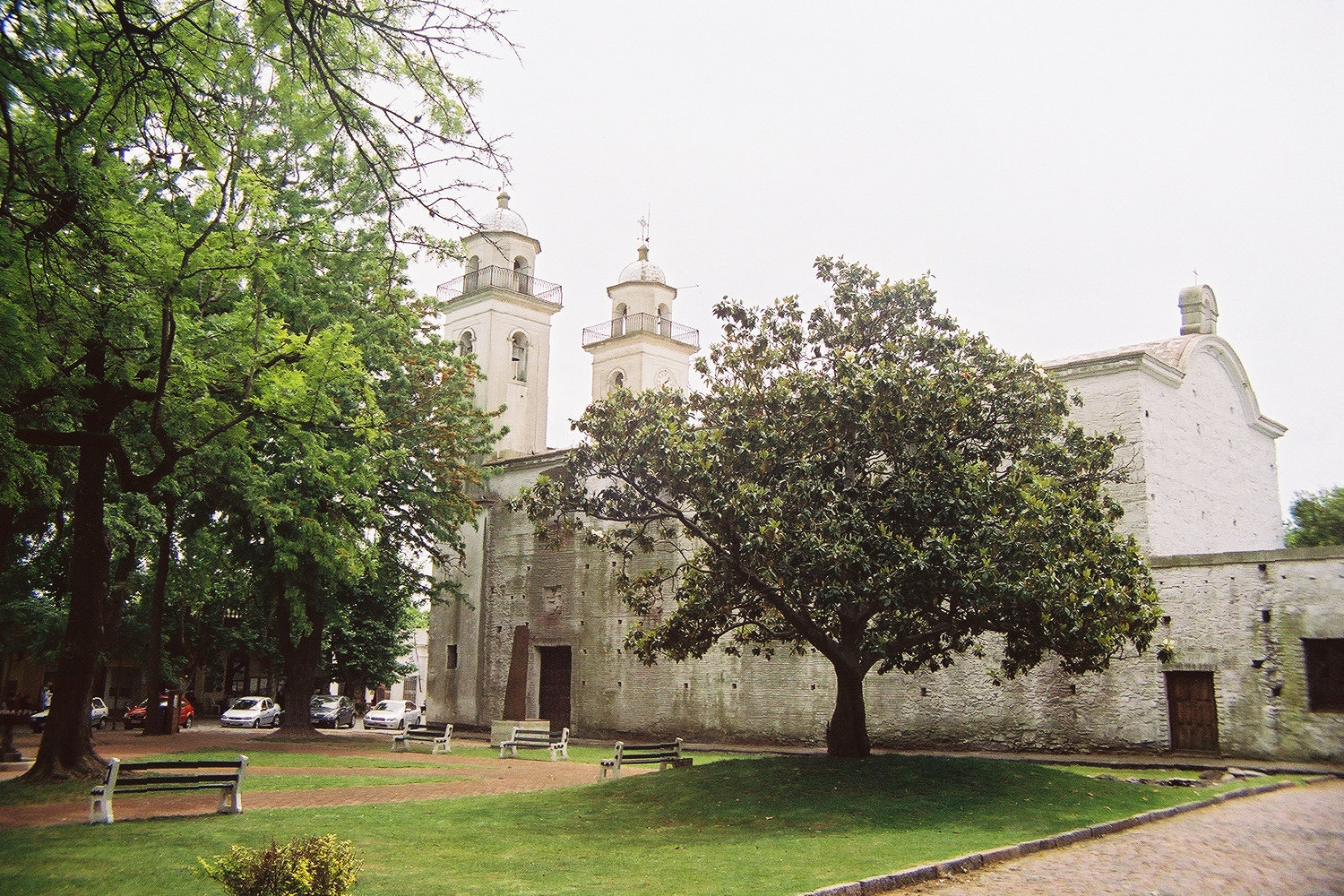
- Basílica del Santísimo Sacramento

- Location within Uruguay
- Coordinates: 34°28′17″S 57°50′39″W
- Country: Uruguay
- Department: Colonia
- Founded: 1680
- Founder: Manuel Lobo

Area
  - Total: 22.9 km^{2} (8.8 sq mi)
- Elevation: 27 m (89 ft)

Population (2023 Census)
  - Total: 32,164
  - Density: 1,400/km^{2} (3,640/sq mi)
- Time zone: UTC -3
- Postal code: 70000
- Dial plan: +598 452 (+5 digits)
- Climate: Cfa
- Website: www.colonia.gub.uy

UNESCO World Heritage Site
- Official name: Historic Quarter of the City of Colonia del Sacramento
- Criteria: Cultural: iv
- Reference: 747
- Inscription: 1995 (19th Session)
- Area: 16 ha (40 acres)

Colonia del Sacramento (Spanish: [koˈlonja ðel sakɾaˈmento]; Brazilian Portuguese: Colônia do Sacramento; European Portuguese: Colónia do Sacramento) is a city in southwestern Uruguay, by the Río de la Plata, facing Buenos Aires, Argentina. It is one of the oldest towns in Uruguay and the capital of the Colonia Department. As of the 2023 census, it has a population of around 32,174.

Its historic quarter is a UNESCO World Heritage Site. Modern Colonia del Sacramento produces textiles and has a free trade zone, in addition to a polytechnic centre and various government buildings.

== History ==
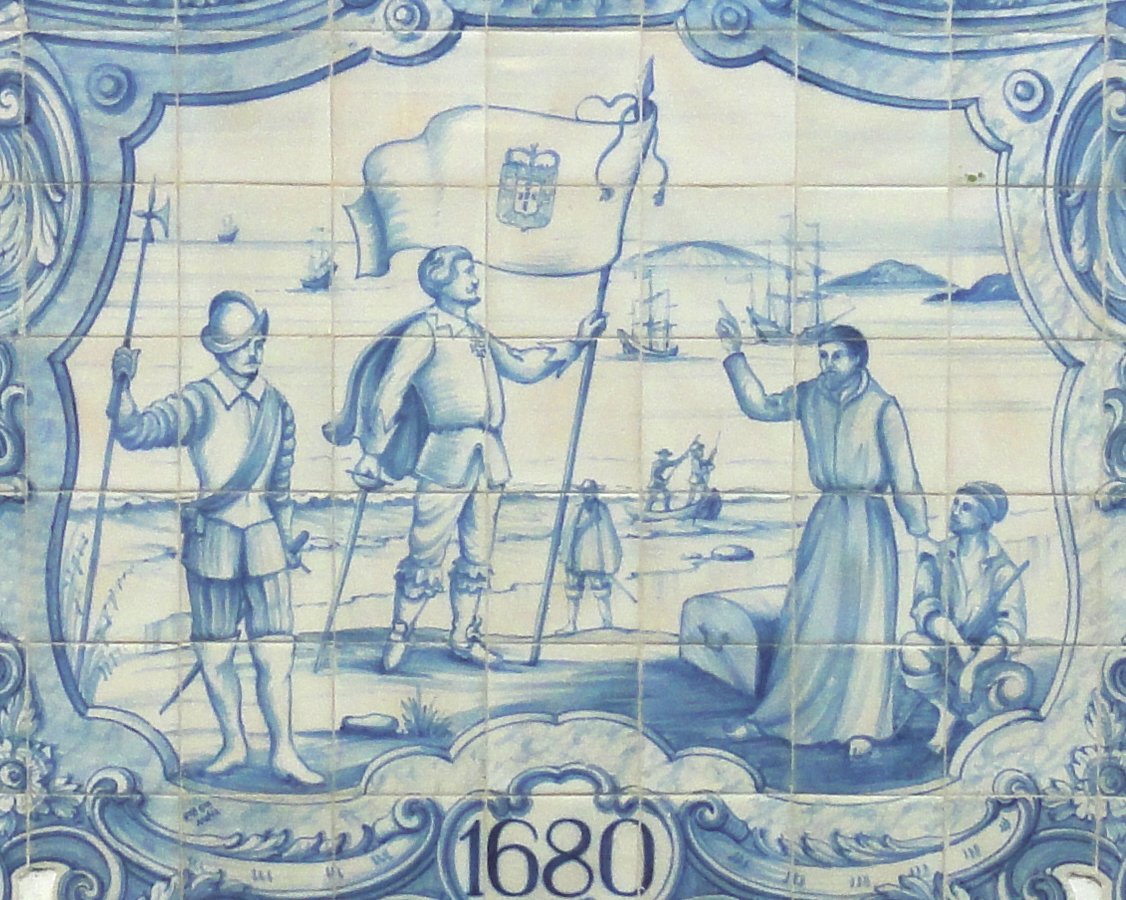
The Portuguese established Colónia do Sacramento in 1680.

Following the restoration of the Portuguese crown, King Peter II sought to establish the southern border of Brazil. Manuel Lobo with 5 ships containing about 400 soldiers, craftsmen, carpenters and stonecutters, and 18 guns, reached San Gabriel Island on 20 January 1680. On 28 January, they commenced establishing a post.

José de Garro sent spies from Santo Domingo de Soriano on 22 February 1680, after receiving a negative response on 10 February to his ultimatum to leave the site. Garro sent a force of 3,400 men under the command of Antonio de Vera Mujica, capturing the besieged town on the night of 6–7 August 1680. Lobo was taken as a prisoner to Buenos Aires, where he died on 7 January 1683. A treaty between Spain and Portugal signed in 1681 returned Colonia to Portugal.

Field Marshal Duarte Teixeira Chaves arrived off the San Gabriel Islands on 25 January 1683, and commenced to rebuild the settlement. Field Marshal Cristóvão Dornelas Abreu was its governor until 1690, when Dom Francisco Naper de Lencastre took over. Smuggling, and cattle hunting from the Banda Oriental, were the main components of the colony's economy. Lencastre ordered the building of houses of stone and mud with tile roofs, the enlargement of the city walls, and the addition of a fortified tower. The colonists grew wheat, hemp flax, and grape vines, and exported cattle hides to Rio de Janeiro, while importing wood and foodstuffs. Sebastião da Veiga Cabral took over as governor in 1699.

As a consequence of the War of the Spanish Succession, the governor of Buenos Aires, Valdes Incian, initiated the Siege of Colonia del Sacramento. The forces of the Spanish governor were commanded by Baltazar García Ros from 18 October 1704 until 14 March 1705, when the colonists were evacuated by Portuguese ships. Only the churches and bridge remained undestroyed.

The colony was given back to Portugal in the Treaty of Utrecht. Manuel Gomes Barbosa took possession on 10 February 1718 with 1,040 colonists. More colonists arrived in 1721. Antonio Pedro de Vasconcellos took over as governor on 14 March 1722 and transformed it into the richest and best-defended city in the Rio de la Plata region. This included the coastal bastions of São Pedro de Alcântara, São Miguel, Santo António, São João, Carmo, and Santa Rita.

During the Spanish–Portuguese war from 1735 to 1737, another attack failed. Don Luis Garcia de Bivar took over as governor in 1749, but died on 5 March 1760. During that time, the Treaty of Madrid (13 January 1750) was never complied with and was finally considered null and void. Brigadier Vicente da Silva da Fonseca then took over as governor. Fonseca was forced to surrender the colony to Pedro Antonio de Cevallos on 11 October 1762. Spain returned the colony in the 1762 Treaty of Fontainebleau, and Dom José Pedro de Figueiredo Sarmento took over as governor on 27 December 1763. He was replaced by Francisco José da Rocha on 15 March 1777.

With the Treaty of San Ildefonso in 1777, the colony became a Spanish possession once more.

It then transferred to Portuguese control again, being later incorporated into Brazil after 1816, when the entire Banda Oriental (Uruguay) was seized by the government of the United Kingdom of Portugal, Brazil and the Algarves and renamed the Cisplatina province.

On 10 January 1809, before the independence of Uruguay, it was designated as a "Vila" ("town" in Portuguese) and has since been elevated to the status of "Ciudad" ("city" in Spanish).

Since independence, Colonia del Sacramento has expanded to the north and east, but the original Bairro Histórico (historic quarter in Portuguese or Barrio Histórico, current Spanish spelling) retains its irregular, terrain-fitting street plan built by the Portuguese, contrasting with the wider, orthogonal calles in the newer Spanish area.

In 2022, it was confirmed Uruguay planned to create a Silicon Valley-style new city in Colonia called Colonia Ala Este, to entice Argentine immigrants due to Argentina's poor economic situation. This would double Colonia's population to about 60,000 people. With an initial investment of more than US$100 million, it was planned to build a sustainable city open to the community as a hub for the knowledge economy industry on a 500-hectare site, which includes forests and seven kilometers of coastline, with beaches such as Calabrés and Fernando.

=== Timeline of rule ===
The rule from 1680 to present (with flag of the period) is:

From	To	Rule	Reason for end
1680	1680	Portugal	conquered by José de Garro
1680	1681	Spain	treaty between Spain and Portugal
1681	1705	Portugal	conquered in the War of Spanish Succession
1705	1713	Spain	Treaty of Utrecht
1714	1762	Portugal	First Cevallos expedition
1762	1763	Spain	Treaty of Paris (1763)
1763	1777	Portugal	Second Cevallos expedition
1777	1811	Spain	Revolt led by José Gervasio Artigas
1811	1817	Liga Federal	Portuguese conquest
1817	1822	United Kingdom of Portugal, Brazil and the Algarves	Brazilian Declaration of Independence
1822	1828	Brazil	Cisplatine War and independence of Uruguay
1828	present	Uruguay	

== Population ==
In 2023 Colonia del Sacramento had a population of 32,174.

Year	Population
1908	8,021
1963	12,846
1975	17,046
1985	19,102
1996	22,200
2004	21,714
2011	26,231
2023	32,174

Source: National Statistics Institute

== Geography ==
=== Climate ===
Colonia del Sacramento has a mild humid subtropical climate, described by the Köppen climate classification as Cfa. Summers are warm and winters are cool, with relatively frequent frosts and fog. The precipitation is evenly distributed throughout the year, with an average of 1,039 mm (40.91 in), and the annual average temperature is 17 °C (63 °F).

Climate data for Colonia del Sacramento, Uruguay (1991–2020, extremes 1940–2020)
Month	Jan	Feb	Mar	Apr	May	Jun	Jul	Aug	Sep	Oct	Nov	Dec	Year
Record high °C (°F)	39.7 (103.5)	37.4 (99.3)	36.8 (98.2)	34.6 (94.3)	30.8 (87.4)	36.0 (96.8)	29.0 (84.2)	35.0 (95.0)	32.8 (91.0)	36.4 (97.5)	38.0 (100.4)	38.7 (101.7)	39.7 (103.5)
Mean daily maximum °C (°F)	28.7 (83.7)	27.6 (81.7)	25.8 (78.4)	22.4 (72.3)	18.7 (65.7)	15.6 (60.1)	14.6 (58.3)	16.9 (62.4)	18.6 (65.5)	21.4 (70.5)	24.6 (76.3)	27.4 (81.3)	21.9 (71.4)
Daily mean °C (°F)	23.7 (74.7)	23.0 (73.4)	21.4 (70.5)	18.3 (64.9)	14.9 (58.8)	12.0 (53.6)	11.0 (51.8)	12.7 (54.9)	14.3 (57.7)	16.9 (62.4)	19.7 (67.5)	22.3 (72.1)	17.5 (63.5)
Mean daily minimum °C (°F)	18.8 (65.8)	18.5 (65.3)	17.0 (62.6)	14.1 (57.4)	11.2 (52.2)	8.3 (46.9)	7.3 (45.1)	8.5 (47.3)	9.9 (49.8)	12.6 (54.7)	14.9 (58.8)	17.3 (63.1)	13.2 (55.8)
Record low °C (°F)	10.4 (50.7)	9.9 (49.8)	7.9 (46.2)	4.4 (39.9)	1.1 (34.0)	−0.4 (31.3)	−3.0 (26.6)	−0.2 (31.6)	1.5 (34.7)	2.7 (36.9)	5.3 (41.5)	7.6 (45.7)	−3.0 (26.6)
Average precipitation mm (inches)	100.5 (3.96)	111.1 (4.37)	125.8 (4.95)	100.6 (3.96)	82.5 (3.25)	68.8 (2.71)	75.8 (2.98)	68.9 (2.71)	78.3 (3.08)	112.9 (4.44)	103.5 (4.07)	115.8 (4.56)	1,144.5 (45.06)
Average precipitation days (≥ 1.0 mm)	6	6	7	7	6	5	5	6	6	7	7	7	75
Average relative humidity (%)	66	70	73	74	75	77	76	73	71	71	68	66	72
Mean monthly sunshine hours	288.3	237.3	235.6	180.0	167.4	132.0	151.9	179.8	198.0	223.2	240.0	272.8	2,506.3
Mean daily sunshine hours	9.3	8.4	7.6	6.0	5.4	4.4	4.9	5.8	6.6	7.2	8.0	8.8	6.8
Source 1: Instituto Uruguayo de Metereología
Source 2: NOAA (precipitation 1991–2020) Instituto Nacional de Investigación Agropecuaria (sun and humidity 1980–2009)

== Urban fabric ==
The city was developed on a peninsula that protrudes into the Río de la Plata. The 16-hectare "Barrio Histórico", or Portuguese Old City, was enclosed by a fortification wall across the peninsula in the site of present-day Calle Ituzaingó. Most of the fortification wall was removed in 1777 and some remaining parts again in 1859. The Portuguese part of the city has an irregular street network.

Outside the wall, the historical part of the city was planned in the Spanish colonial style and in the characteristic checkerboard layout.

== Sport ==
The local professional football team is Plaza Colonia, founded in 1917, playing at the Estadio Profesor Alberto Suppici. They won the 2016 Clausura national championship, their biggest success to date.

Deportivo Colonia, founded in 1999, lost its professional status in 2007. They play at the Estadio Miguel Campomar.

Club Atlético Plaza has futsal, volleyball and basketball sections, as well as a football section based at Estadio Néstor Naviliat.

The town's Plaza de toros Real de San Carlos is a disused bullring which has been renovated and repurposed as stage for half-marathon with over 1,500 runners and performing arts venue such as La Renga concert.

== Points of interest ==
The Barrio Histórico (historic quarter) section of Colonia del Sacramento is designated a World Heritage Site by UNESCO. It has some cobblestone streets built by the Portuguese in the 17th century, and is within walking distance of the town's ferry terminal. Among the tourist attractions around the tree-lined Plaza Mayor (main square) are:

- Portón de Campo – the City Gate and wooden drawbridge
- Lighthouse and convent ruins of the 17th-century Convent of San Francisco
- Basílica del Santísimo Sacramento – the Basilica of the Holy Sacrament, built of stone by the Portuguese in 1808
- Portuguese Museum – constructed in the 18th century, it exhibits Portuguese furnishings, jewelry, uniforms and old maps of Portuguese naval expeditions
- Casa de Nacarello – an 18th-century Portuguese house
- Calle de los Suspiros, a historical street
- Municipal Museum – rebuilt by the Spanish in 1835 as the Casa del Almirante Brown, it exhibits artifacts and documents of the city's different periods and cultures
- Viceroy's House – the Casa del Virrey, reconstructed from the original ruins
- Plaza de toros Real de San Carlos, a former bullring and a current sports and cultural venue

== Gallery ==
Views of the Barrio Histórico

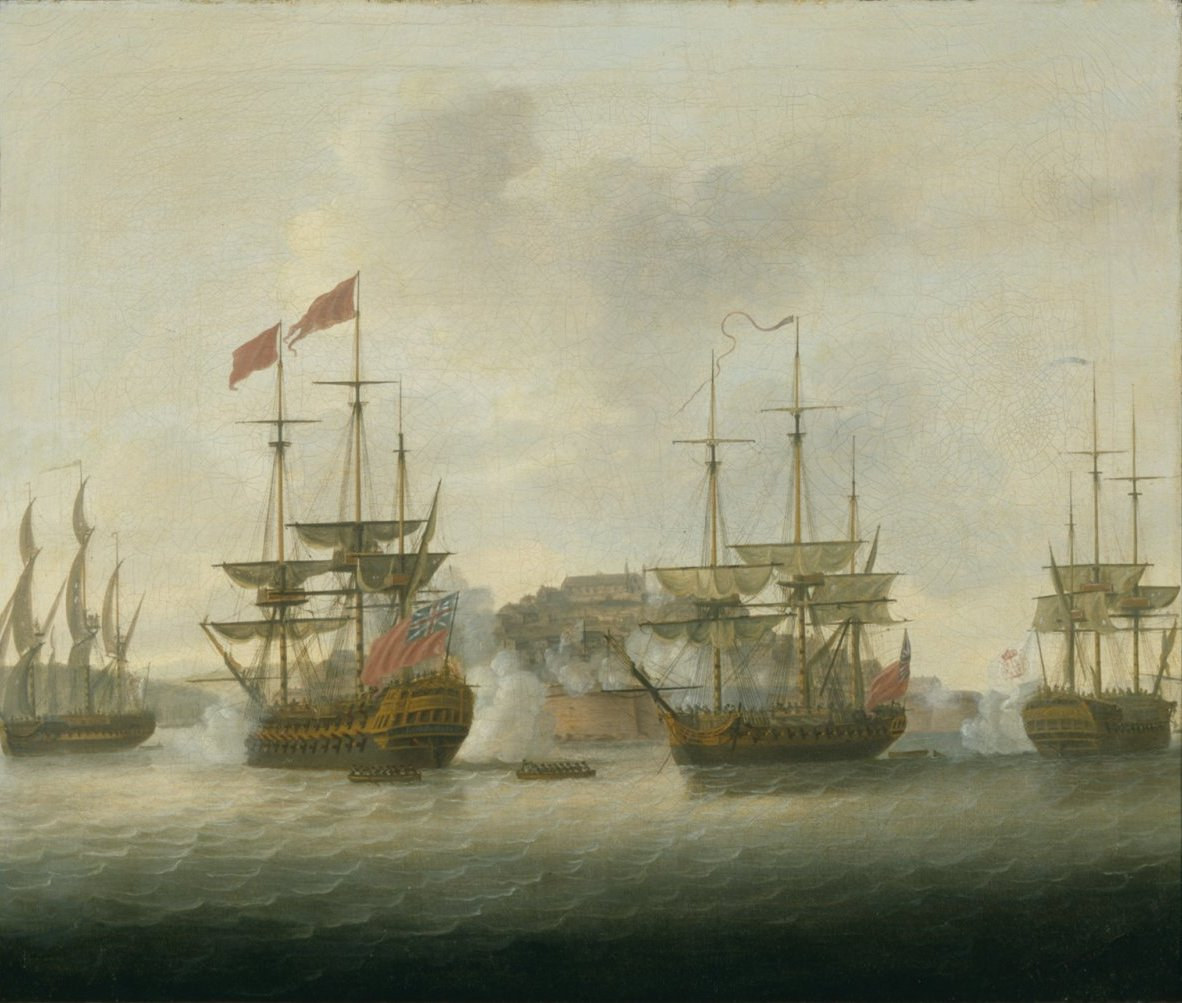
The Portuguese led attack on Nova Colonia, 6 January 1763

Map of the Old City in ceramic tiles

View of the historic district from the top of the lighthouse

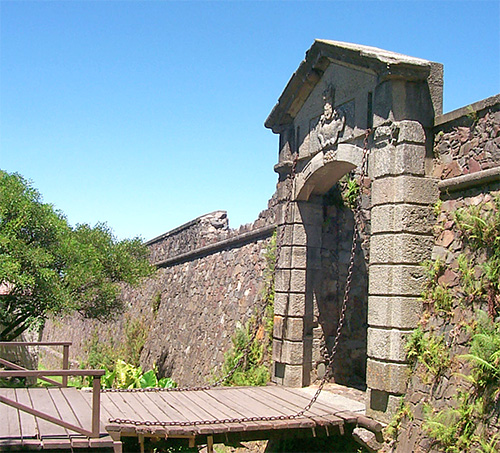
Portón de Campo, the City Gate

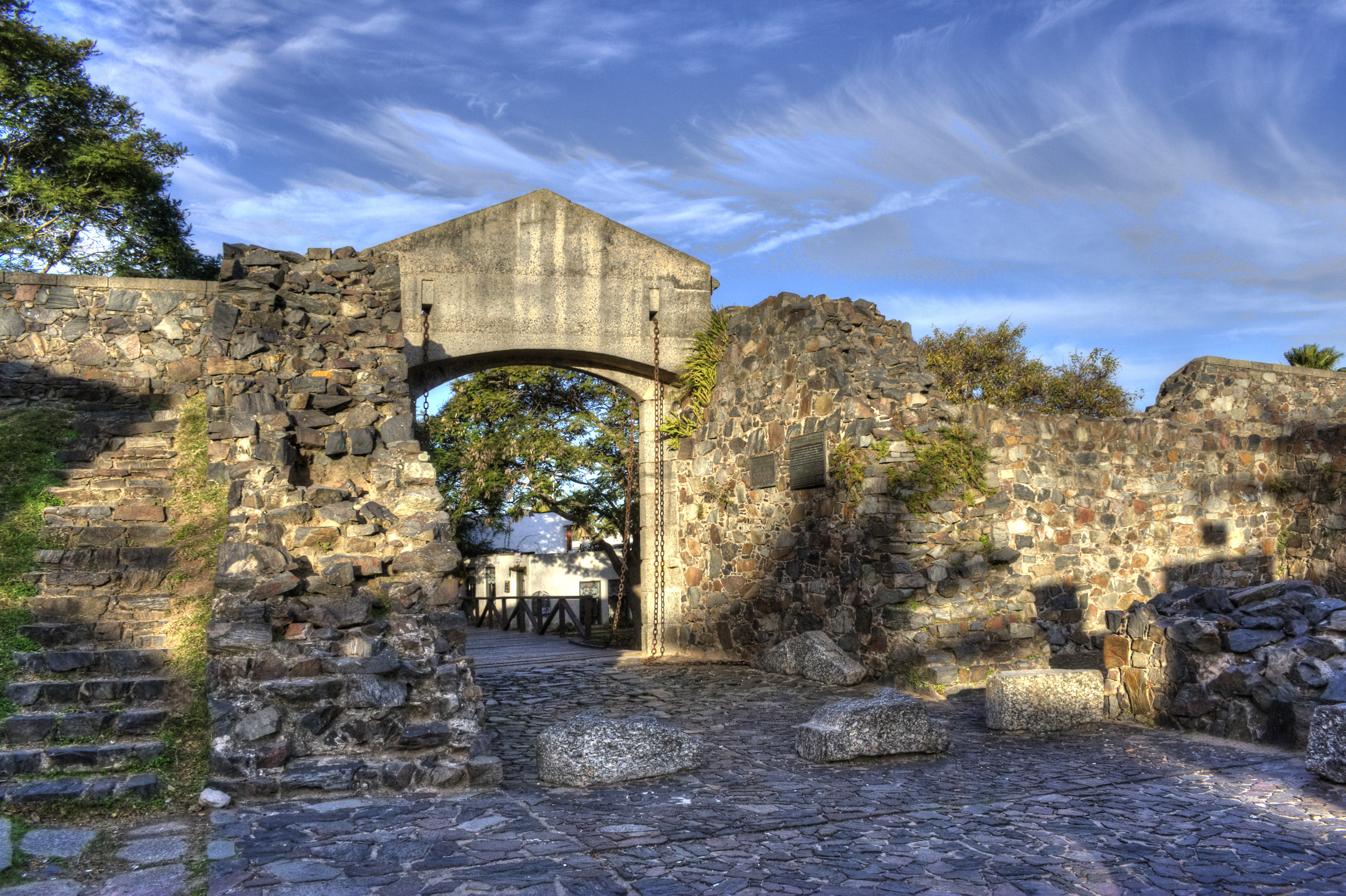
Another view of the City Gate

Lighthouse at Colonia del Sacramento

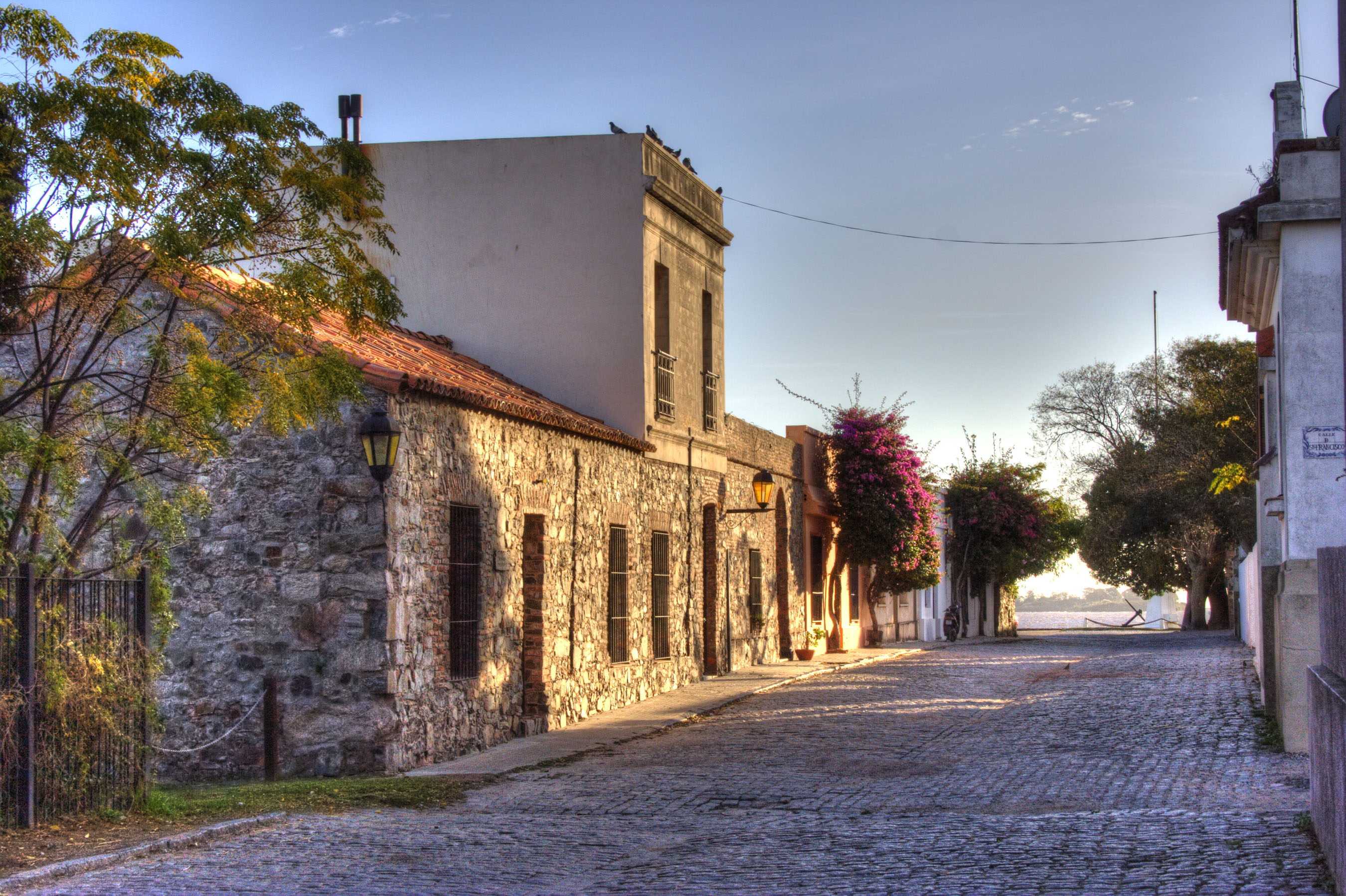
Calle San Pedro, a typical street in the historic district

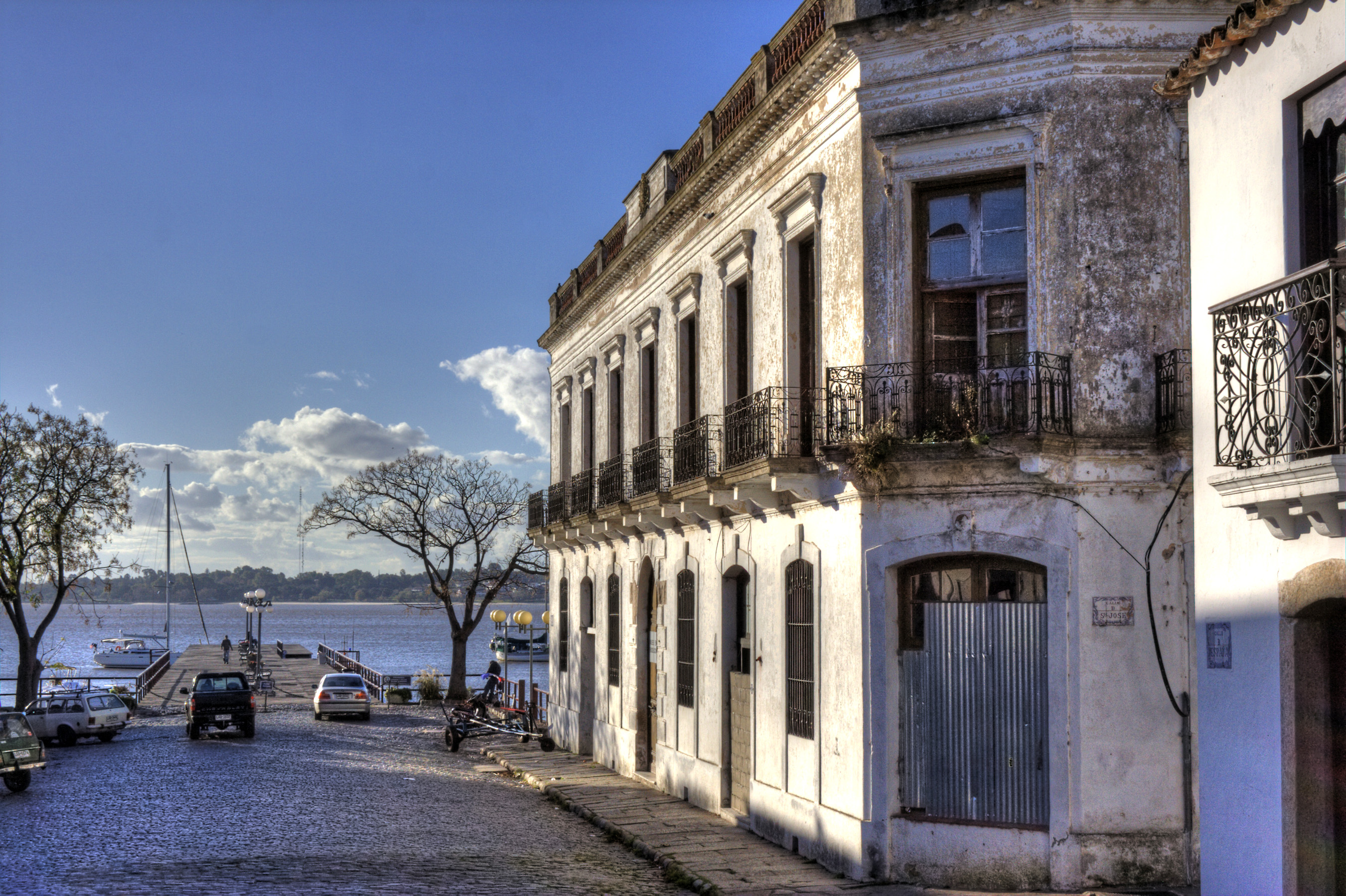
The 1866 Wharf of Colonia

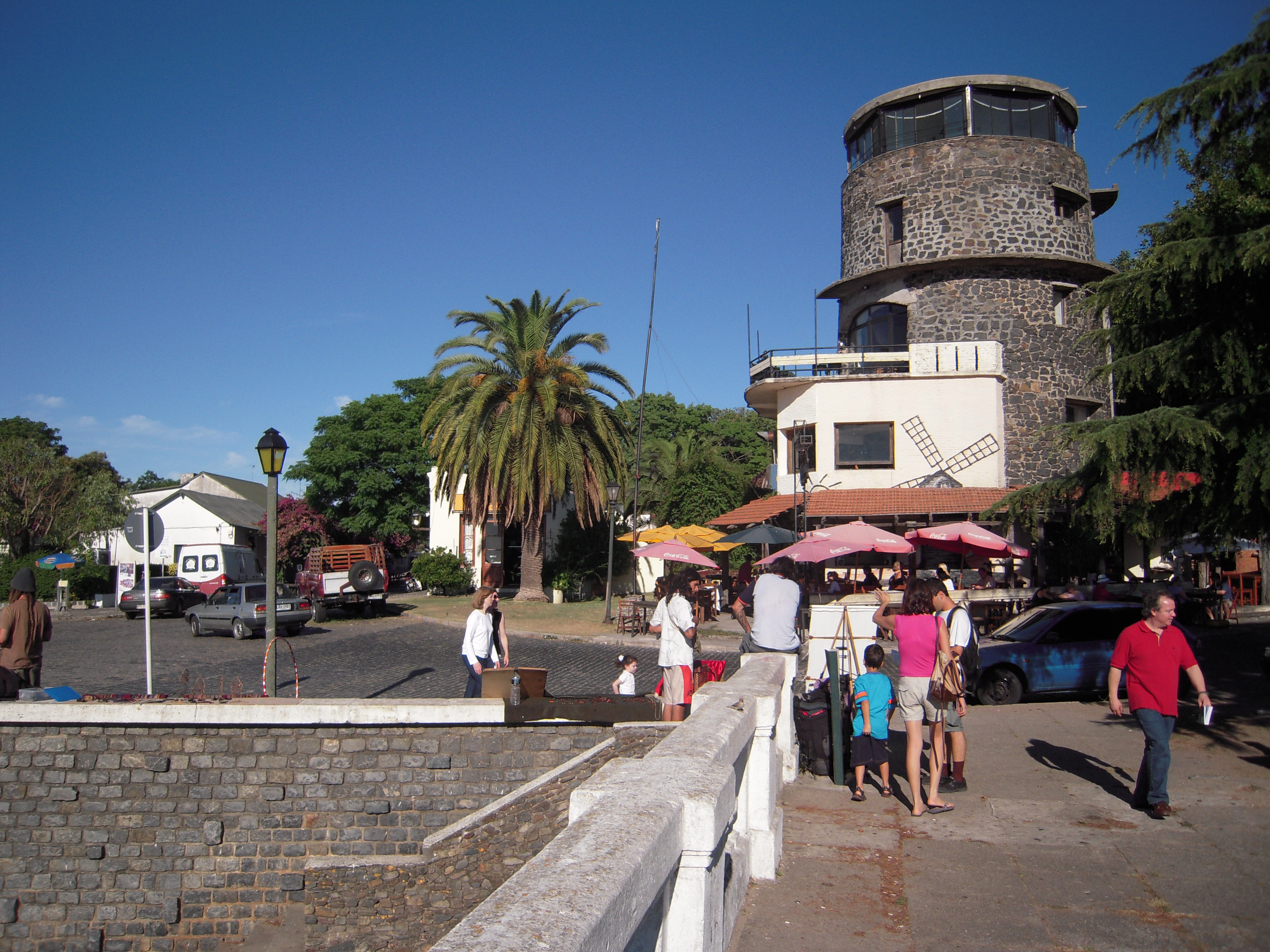
The water front

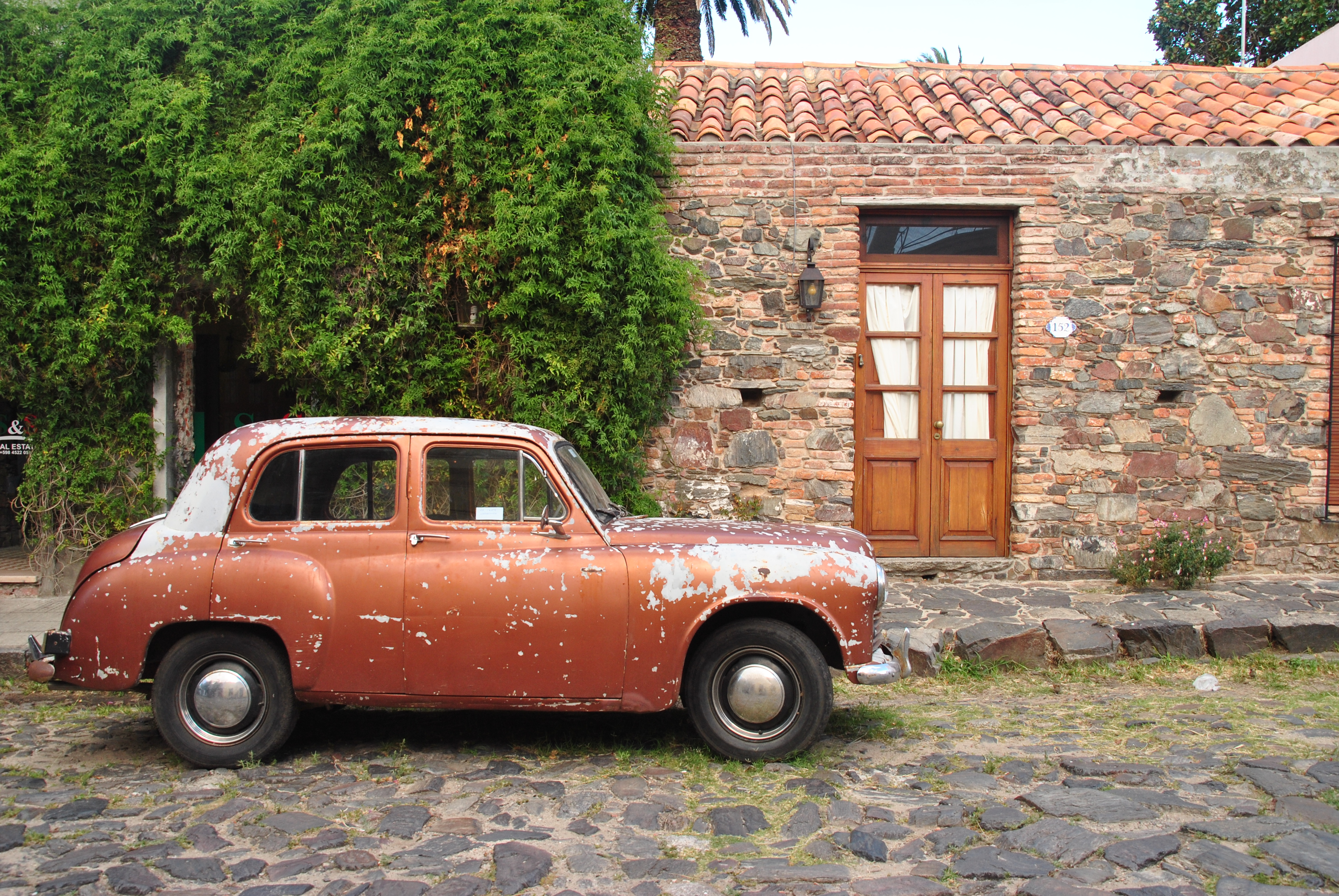
Old car parked on Calle Real in the historic district

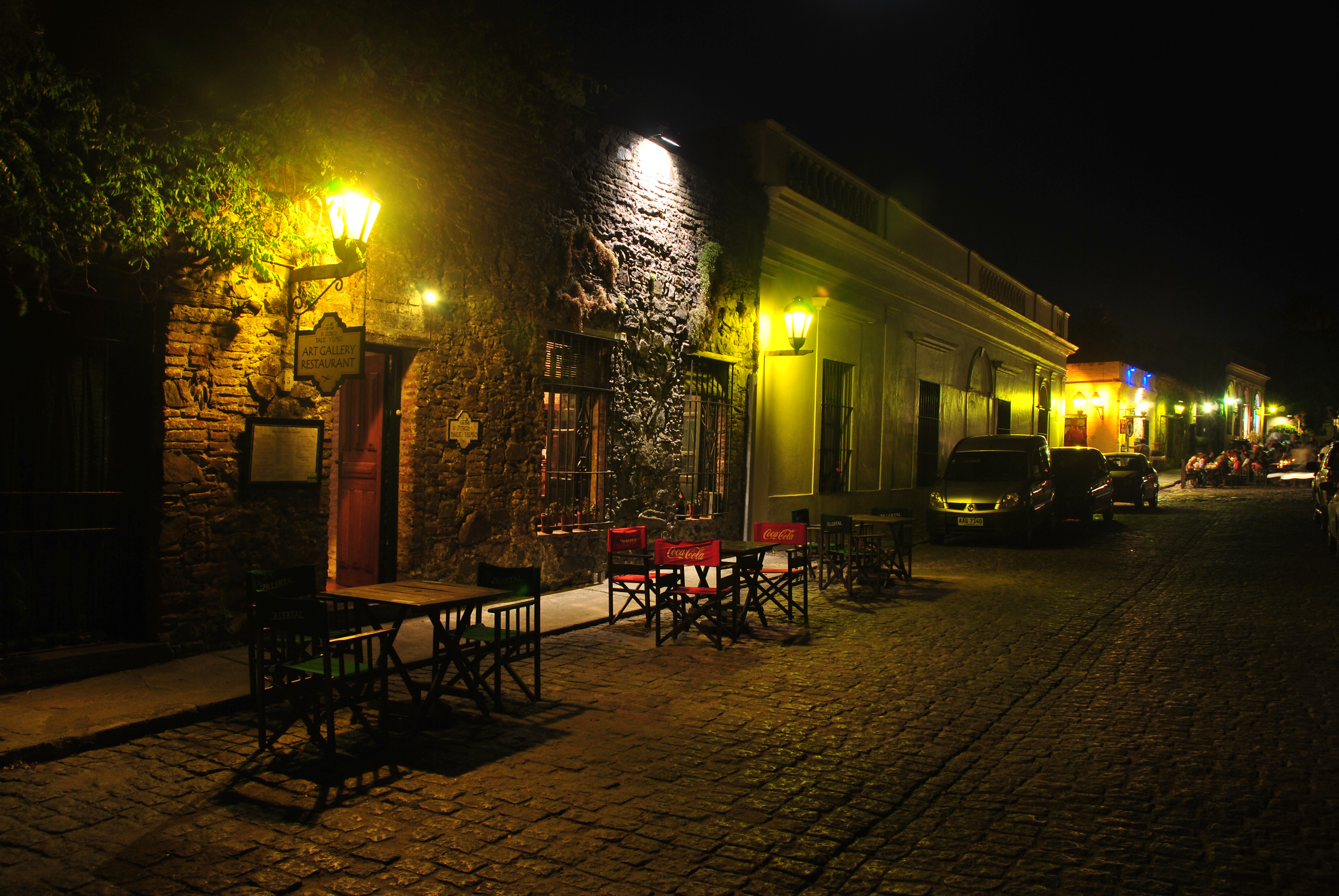
Night at the historic quarter district - "Misiones de los Tapes" Street

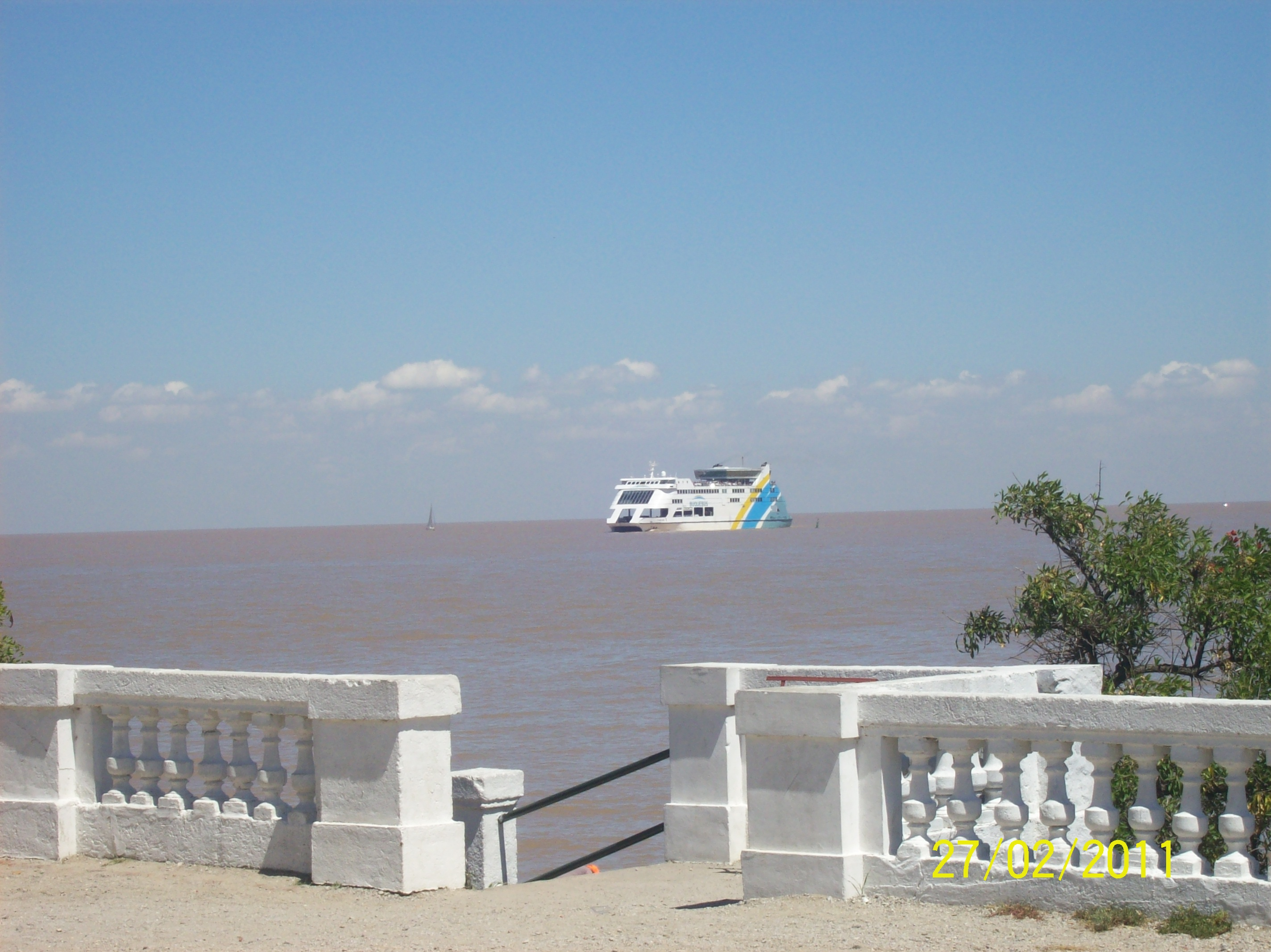
The Buquebus seen from the Paseo San Gabriel

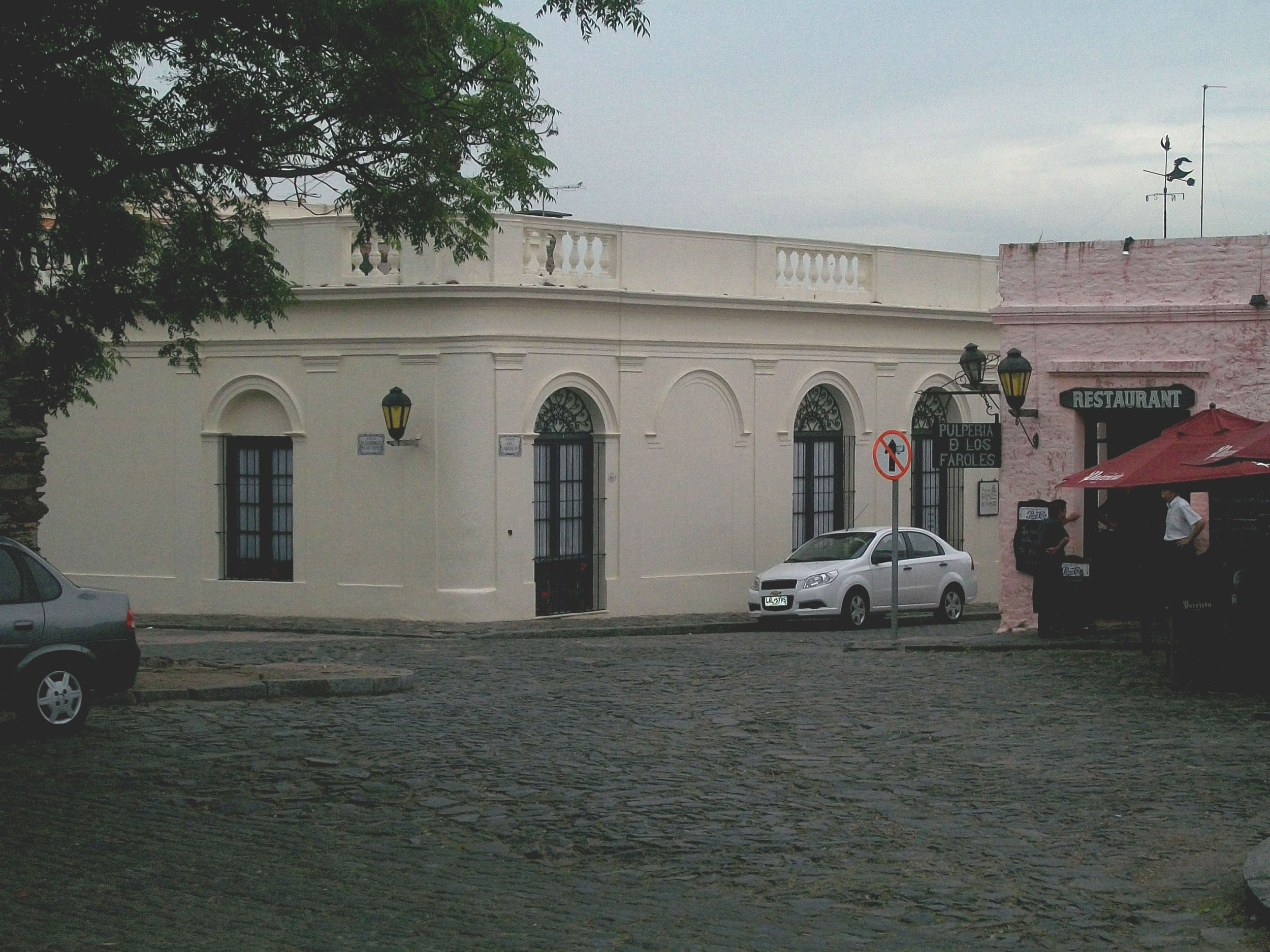
Restaurant on a corner

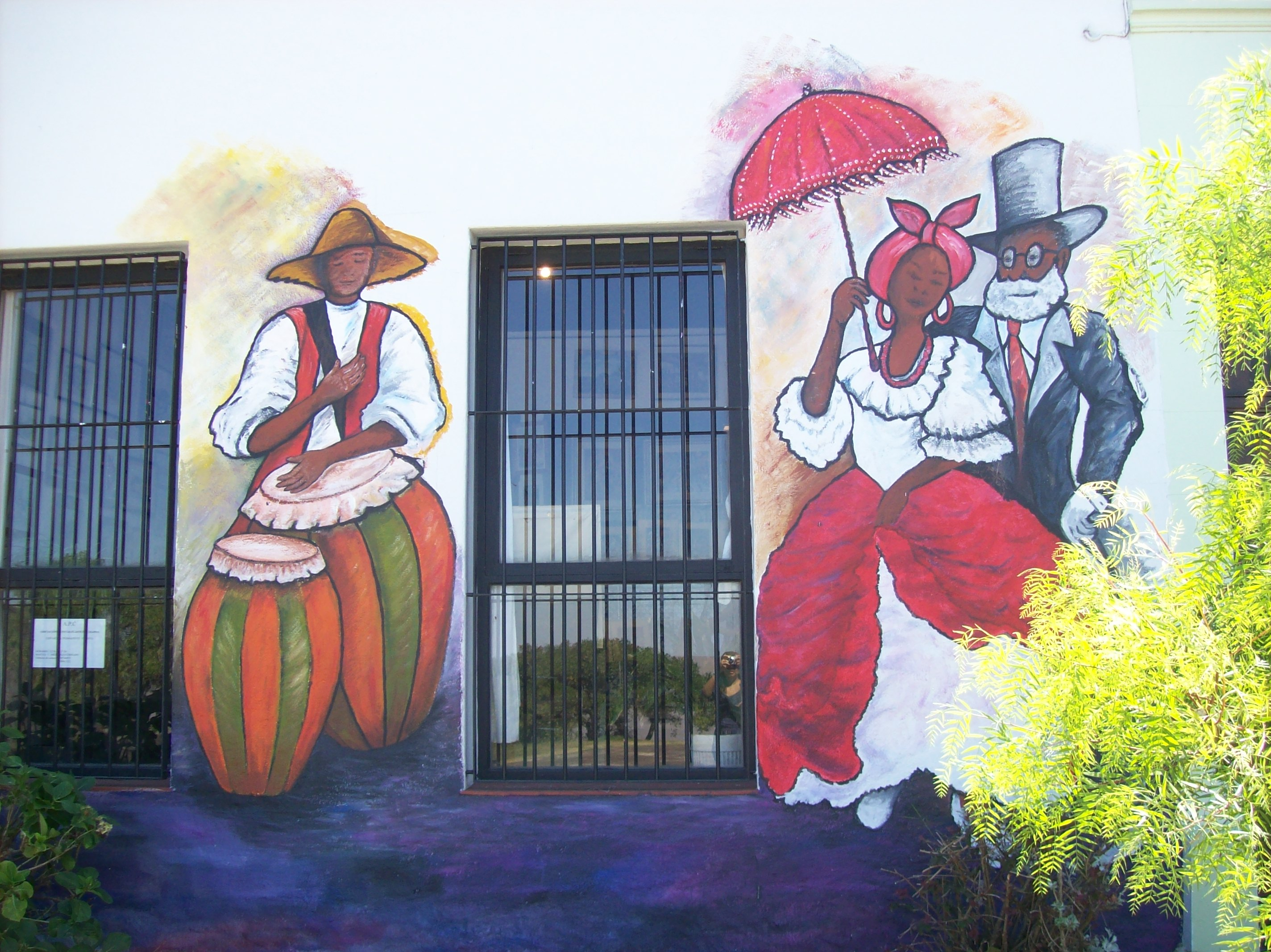
Wall art in Colonia del Sacramento

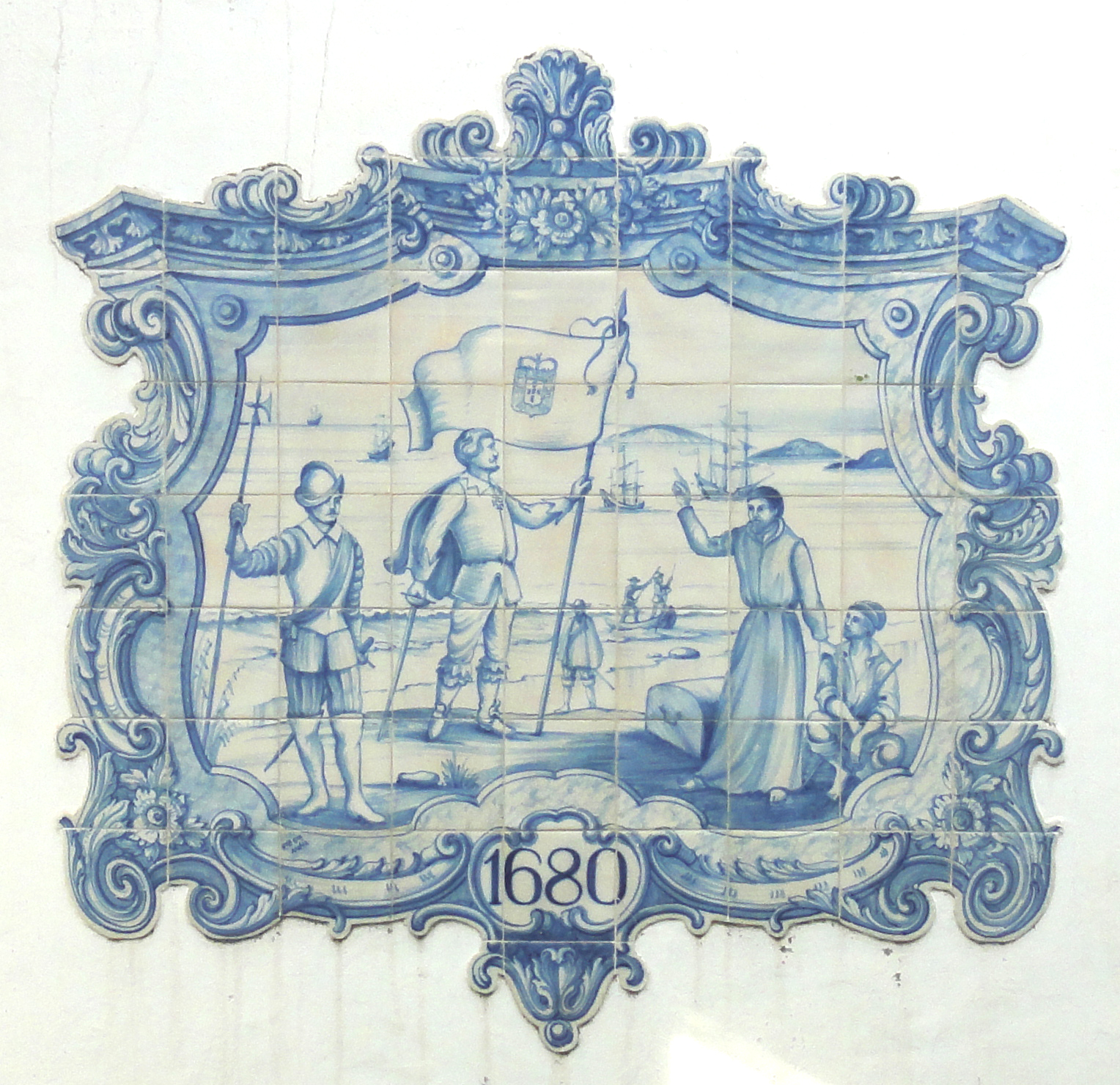
Remains of Portuguese Azulejo

== Transportation ==
Colonia del Sacramento is served by three ferry boat lines (1.5 hours) from Buenos Aires, Argentina: "Buquebus", "Colonia Express" and "Seacat Colonia". As of 2025, 2.5—2.9 million people yearly travel across the River Plate, with Colonia as the busiest with 2.1 million people.

Two principal highways end in Colonia: Route 1 connects Colonia to Montevideo 180 km to the east. Route 21 connects to points north, including the Aarón de Anchorena National Park (30 kilometres (19 mi) distant), and Fray Bentos where the Libertador General San Martín Bridge (100 km up river) is the last cross-border bridge over the River Plate area; by road over 450 km from Colonia to Buenos Aires.

The town is served by Colonia Airport located 6 kilometres (4 mi) from Colonia along Route 1. There is a project in process to lengthen the runway from 1,375 m, and begin commercial flights to Buenos Aires (this was done in the past) and other cities within Uruguay.

== Consular representation ==
Argentina maintains a consulate in Colonia del Sacramento.

== Twin towns – sister cities ==
- Antigua Guatemala, Guatemala
- Guimarães, Portugal
- Olinda, Brazil
- Pelotas, Brazil
- Quilmes, Argentina

== See also ==
- List of diplomatic missions in Uruguay § Consulate in Colonia del Sacramento

== Bibliography ==
- Assunção, Fernando O.; Cravotto, Antonio (1996). Colonia del Sacramento, patrimonio mundial. Montevideo: UNESCO. (with prologue by Federico Mayor Zaragoza and introduction by Marta Canessa de Sanguinetti) (in Spanish)
