= Juan Lacaze =

- City
- Coat of arms

- Location within Uruguay
- Coordinates: 34°25′52″S 57°26′54″W
- Country: Uruguay
- Department: Colonia

Population (2011 Census)
  - Total: 12,816
- Time zone: UTC -3
- Postal code: 70001
- Dial plan: +598 4586 (+4 digits)

Juan Lacaze, or Juan L. Lacaze, is a city located in southwestern Uruguay, within the Colonia Department.

== Geography ==
The city is located on Route 54 in southern Colonia, 43 kilometres (27 mi) (by road) east of the city of Colonia del Sacramento, and 150 kilometres (93 mi) west of Montevideo, the country's capital.

Juan Lacaze has coasts over the Río de la Plata basin. The Arroyo Sauce (or Arroyo del Minuano) flows west of the city and the mouth of Rosario River is about 10 kilometres (6.2 mi) to the east.

== History ==
On 15 March 1920, the populated area situated at the "Puerto del Sauce" was declared as "Pueblo" (village) by the Act of Ley Nº 3.433. On 17 August 1920 its status was elevated to "Villa" (town) by the Act of Ley Nº 7.257 and finally elevated to "Ciudad" (city) on 8 May 1953 by the Act of Ley Nº 11.934.

== Population ==
According to the 2011 census, Juan Lacaze had a population of 12,816.

Year	Population
1963	11,204
1975	11,595
1985	12,574
1996	12,988
2004	13,196
2011	12,816

Source: Instituto Nacional de Estadística de Uruguay

== Places of worship ==
- St. Joseph the Worker and St. John Bosco (Roman Catholic, Salesians of Don Bosco)

== Government ==
The city mayor (alcalde) as of November 2020 is Arturo Bentancor.

== Sports ==
Deportivo Colonia has its headquarters in Juan Lacaze.

== Notable people ==
- Pablo Acosta, footballer.
- José Carbajal, musician.
- Javier Chevantón, footballer.
- Osvaldo Laport, actor.
- Martin Nusspaumer, opera singer.
- Cristian Rodríguez, footballer.
- Julio Rodríguez, footballer.
- Obdulio Trasante, footballer.
- Fernando Troche, guitarist.
