= Punta Gorda =

Punta Gorda may refer to several places:

- Punta Gorda, Belize
- Punta Gorda, Colonia, Uruguay
- Punta Gorda, Florida
- Punta Gorda Light, Humboldt County, California, USA
- Punta Gorda, Montevideo, in Uruguay
- Punta Gorda Middle School, is a school
- Punta Gorda, Nicaragua, where Hurricane Felix made landfall as a category 5 hurricane in 2007
- The Punta Gorda coastal area in Ventura County, California

== See also ==
- Punta Gorda Airport (disambiguation)
- Puntagorda, a municipality on Las Palmas Island, Canary Islands
