= MGI =

MGI may refer to:

- Meghna Group of Industries (MGI), a conglomerate in Bangladesh
- MGI (company), a biotechnology company in China
- Midrand Graduate Institute
- Millar Gough Ink, a production company in America
- Martín García Island Airport, in Argentina
- Materials Genome Initiative, a federal initiative for materials discovery
- McKinsey Global Institute
- Miss Grand International, a beauty pageant franchise based in Thailand
- Miss Grand International (company), a conglomerate company in Thailand
- Mouse Genome Informatics, an online database
- Jili language (ISO 639:mgi), spoken in Nigeria
