= Timoteo Domínguez Island =

Island in Uruguay

Isla Timoteo Domínguez
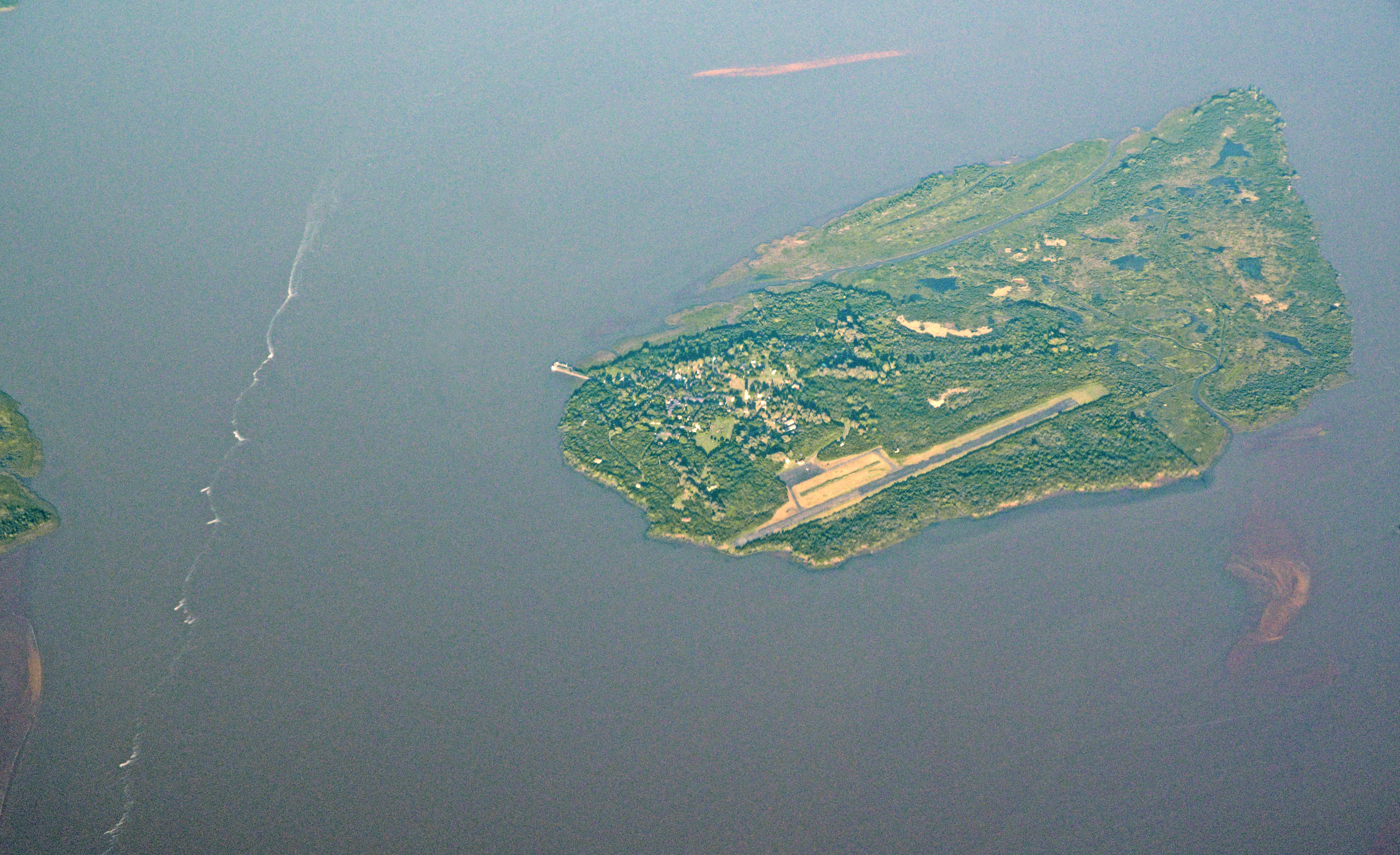
- Aerial view of the island formed by (former) islands Timoteo Domínguez (Uruguay) (top right), and Martín García (Argentina) (bottom left), looking west (November 2019)

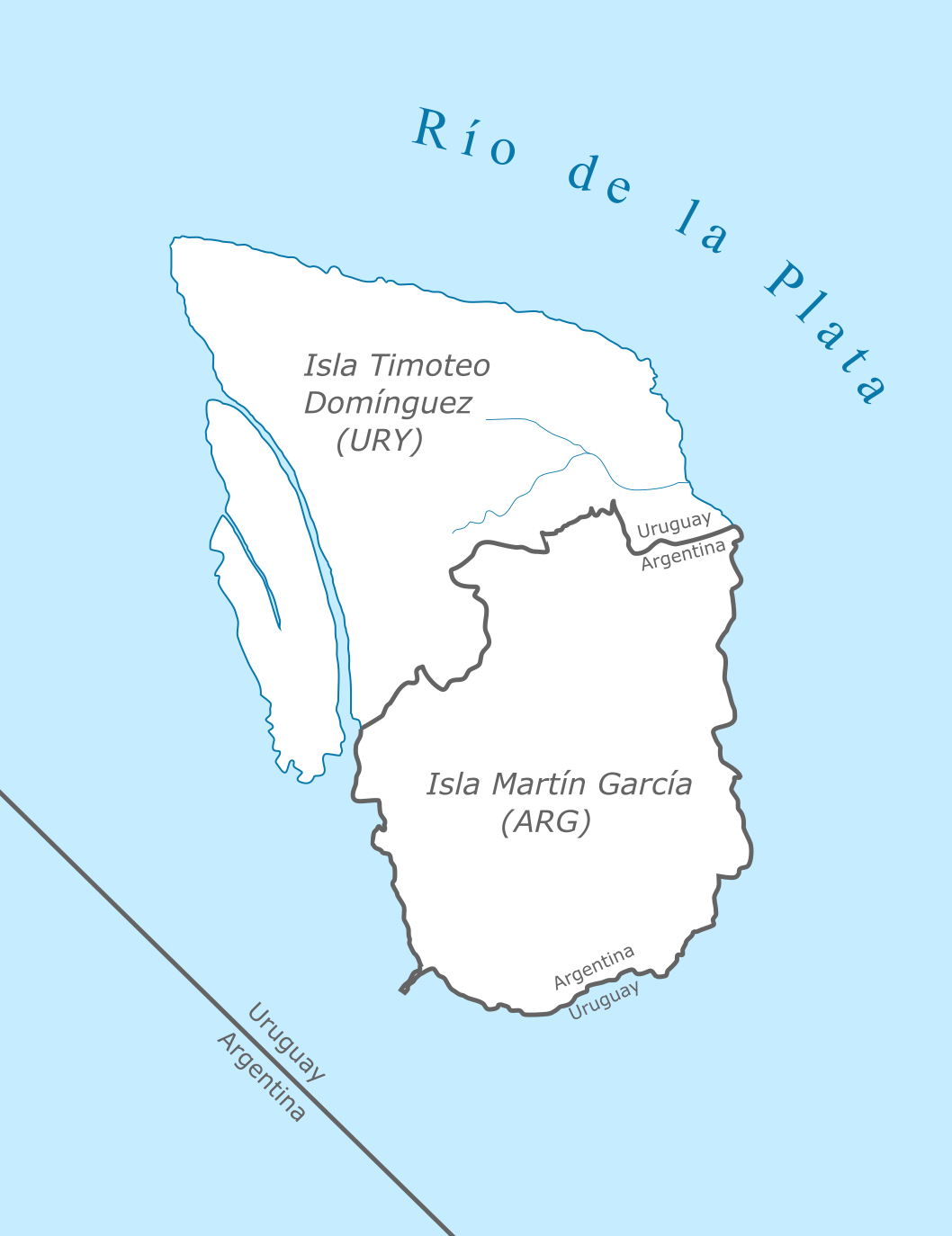
- Diagram of Timoteo Domínguez and Martín García Islands

Geography
- Location: Río de la Plata
- Coordinates: 34°10.2′S 58°15.4′W
- Area: 1.9 km^{2} (0.73 sq mi)

Administration
- Uruguay
- Department: Colonia

Demographics
- Population: 0

Timoteo Domínguez Island (Spanish: Isla Timoteo Domínguez) is the Uruguayan name of an island off the Río de la Plata coast of Uruguay. It contains the country's only land border with Argentina.

== Land border ==
The Argentine exclave Martín García Island is within the boundaries of Uruguayan waters since 1973, when both countries signed the Río de la Plata Treaty establishing Martín García as an Argentine territory to be exclusively used as a nature reserve. In 1961, river sediments gave birth to a small sand bank north of the island, within Uruguay's sovereignty, but as it naturally grew it formed into an island. Finally, in the 1980's, it merged with Martin García creating the very first land border between Uruguay and Argentina.
