= Martín García Channel dispute =

Ongoing territorial dispute between Argentina and Uruguay

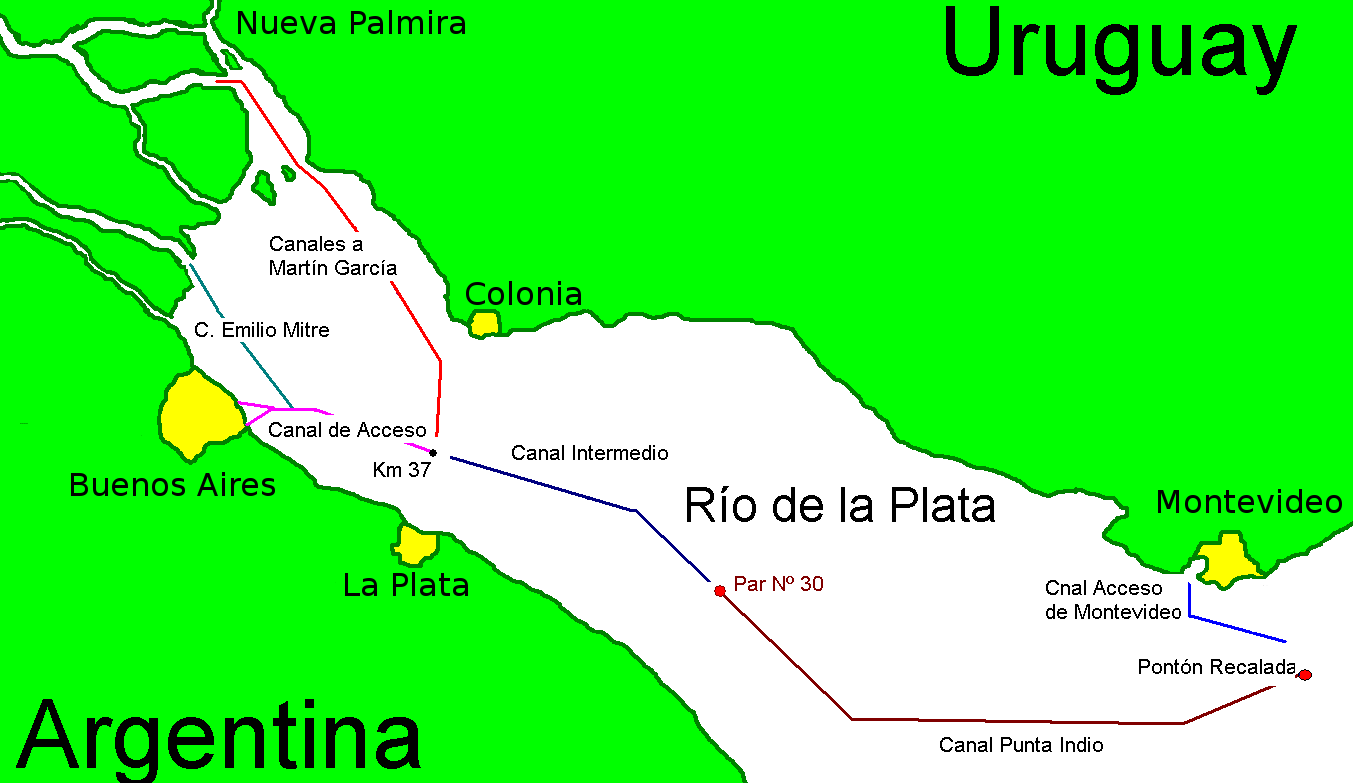
The Martín García Channel. The red line is the waterway between the Río Uruguay and the Atlantic Ocean.

The dredging of the Martín García Channel has been delayed for over ten years because of a dispute between Uruguay and Argentina, which has seriously constrained the development of Uruguayan ports. The Martin García Channel is a dredged waterway between the River Plate (and its Uruguayan ports) and the Uruguay River, jointly shared by the two neighboring countries.

== History ==
In 2006, Argentina dredged the Mitre Channel to 36 feet (11 meters) but refused to dredge the Martín García Channel to the same depth, which would have permitted the transit of ships with a payload more than 45,000 tons. According to Uruguayan media, interests linked to the port of Buenos Aires and Rosario on the Paraná River, the hub of soybean territory, are not interested in seeing Uruguay's Nueva Palmira flourish, and have consistently lobbied against dredging the Martin Garcia Channel.

The bilateral commission Comisión Administradora del Río de la Plata (CARP) oversees the River Plate basin, and among other issues, the upkeep of the Martin Garcia Channel (which serves the Uruguayan coast), the River Plate and the Mitre Channel (which directly serves Buenos Aires). However, the Pulp mill dispute affected the negotiations.

== See also ==
- Pulp mill dispute
- 1973 Boundary Treaty between Uruguay and Argentina
