= Argirópolis =

- Proposed city
- Etymology: Greek: Άργυροπόλις ("silver city")
- Location of Martin Garcia Island in Uruguay
- Coordinates: 34.18°S 58.25°W

French edition of Argyripolis, by Domingo Faustino Sarmiento.

Argirópolis or Arjirópolis (from Greek Άργυροπόλις "silver city") was a proposed city conceived by Argentine statesman Domingo Faustino Sarmiento as the capital of the Confederated States of La Plata (Argentina, Paraguay and Uruguay). It was also the title of the 1850 book that outlined this proposal.

== Proposal ==
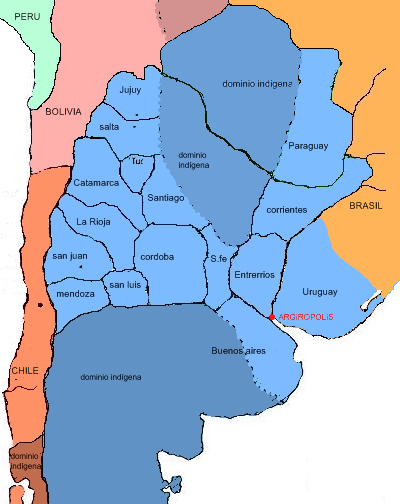
Map of the resulting confederation in ■ lighter blue with Argirópolis in ■ red.

Sarmiento proposes Martin Garcia Island, at the junction of the Parana and Uruguay River, as the site for Argirópolis, which in turn would ultimately be a point of unity between the interior provinces of Argentina and the Estado Oriental (i.e.: Uruguay).

Sarmiento based his argument on the following points:

- The example of the United States, whose capital, Washington DC, does not depend on any state.
- Closing the entrance to the Parana and Uruguay would ensure that Paraguay, Uruguay and the provinces of Corrientes, Santa Fe and Entre Rios would unite in their common interest in favor of the independence of the island of Martín García.
- The independence of the island from the United Provinces of the Río de la Plata, Uruguay, and Paraguay would make these three states equal in negotiations on free navigation in the rivers.
- By placing the capital in neutral territory, no preference would be given to the rival cities of Buenos Aires and Montevideo.
- This could facilitate the island's return from its French occupiers.

== Orthography ==
The 1850 edition tried to follow the Spanish orthography proposed by Sarmiento in 1843, similar to that of Andrés Bello. Nonetheless, there were occasional slips into the RAE standard. Later editions follow the common orthography.
