= Barra del Indio =

Shoal in the Río de la Plata

Barra del Indio (also known as Del Indio, Barra Indio) is a submerged shoal in the Rio De La Plata river. It is the longest shoal in the world with a length of 220 km. It divides the estuary of the Río de La Plata river from the ocean water. It is a breeding site of many species of fish.

Barra del Indio acts as a barrier, dividing the Rio De La Plata into an inner freshwater riverine and an outer brackish estuarine area. The shoal is located approximately between Montevideo and Punta Piedras, in the northwest end of Samborombon Bay.
