= Argentina–Uruguay border =

International border

Coordinates: 30°00′S 57°55′W

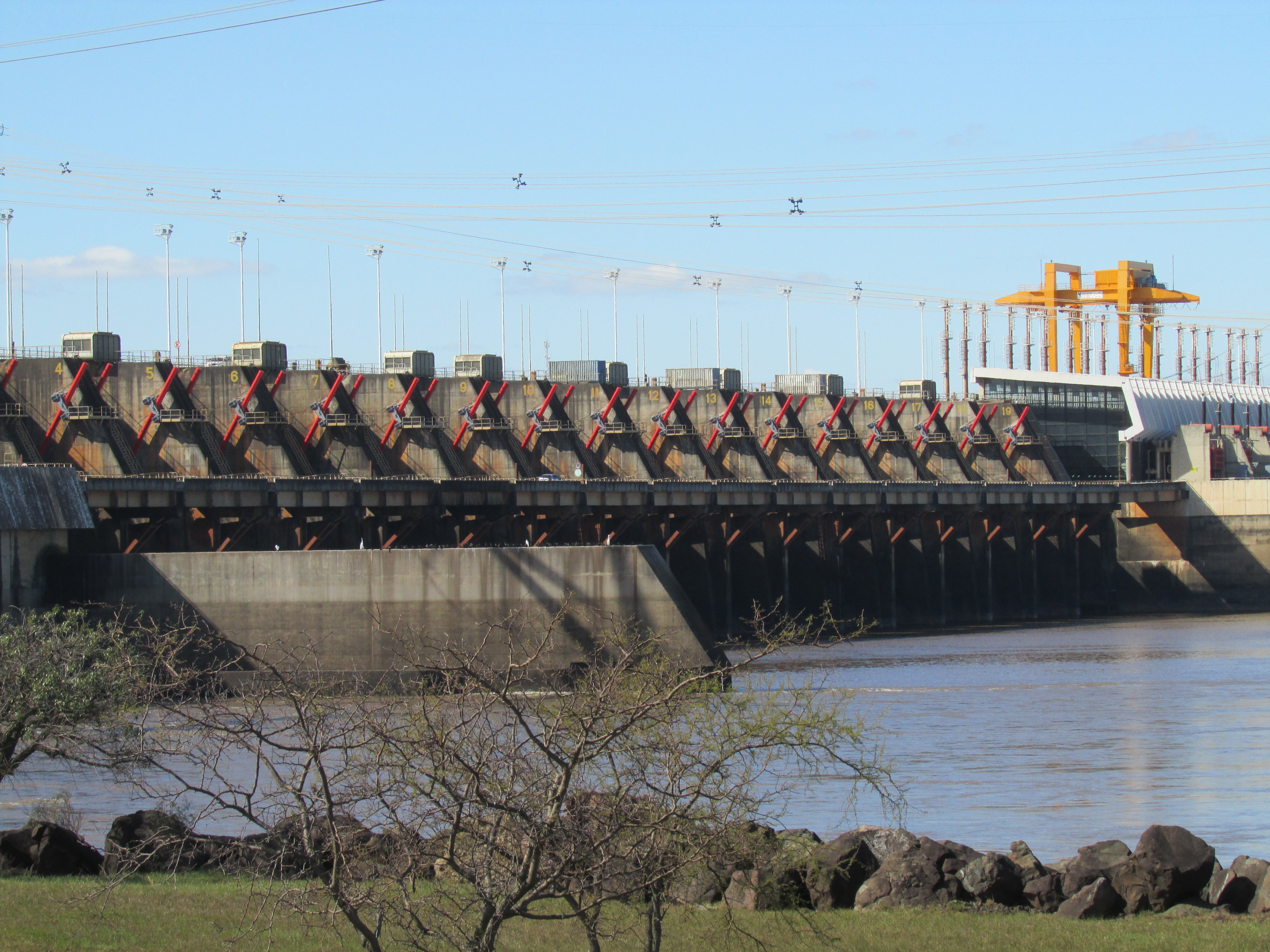
The Salto Grande Dam is located between Argentina and Uruguay.

The Argentina–Uruguay border is a line of 579 km marked by the Uruguay River, and is the border between Argentina and Uruguay. It starts in a triple border Argentina-Uruguay-Brazil, at the mouth of the Quaraí River in the Uruguay. The course follows the Uruguay river, passing west of the Uruguayan departments of Artigas, Salto, Paysandu, Rio Negro, Soriano and Colonia and the Argentine provinces of Corrientes, Entre Rios and Buenos Aires, until the confluence of the Uruguay and the Paraná rivers into the Rio de la Plata.

== History ==
The Uruguay River was always a physical limit that separated the former Eastern Band of the rest of the Viceroyalty of Rio de La Plata and Banda Oriental. Depending on the presence of this river, the border between Banda Oriental and Viceroyalty of Rio de La Plata was not disputed.

From 1815 to 1816 the government of the United Kingdom of Portugal, Brazil and the Algarves (Brazil before independence) tried to annex the region of the current Uruguay to Brazil. This occurred with the Brazilian victory against Uruguay during the Battle of Tacuarembó in 1820. The region was called Province of Cisplatina of already independent Empire of Brazil.

It was echoed by Uruguayan supported by troops from Argentina on 25 August 1828. After the war, the Treaty of Montevideo, sovereign Republic of Uruguay was created. The current border was established at that time. The official name of Uruguay, Eastern Republic of Uruguay, says that the country is on the east side of the Uruguay River.

== See also ==
- 1973 Boundary Treaty between Uruguay and Argentina
