= Martín García Island Airport =

Airport in Argentina

Martín García Island Airport Aeródromo de la Isla Martín García
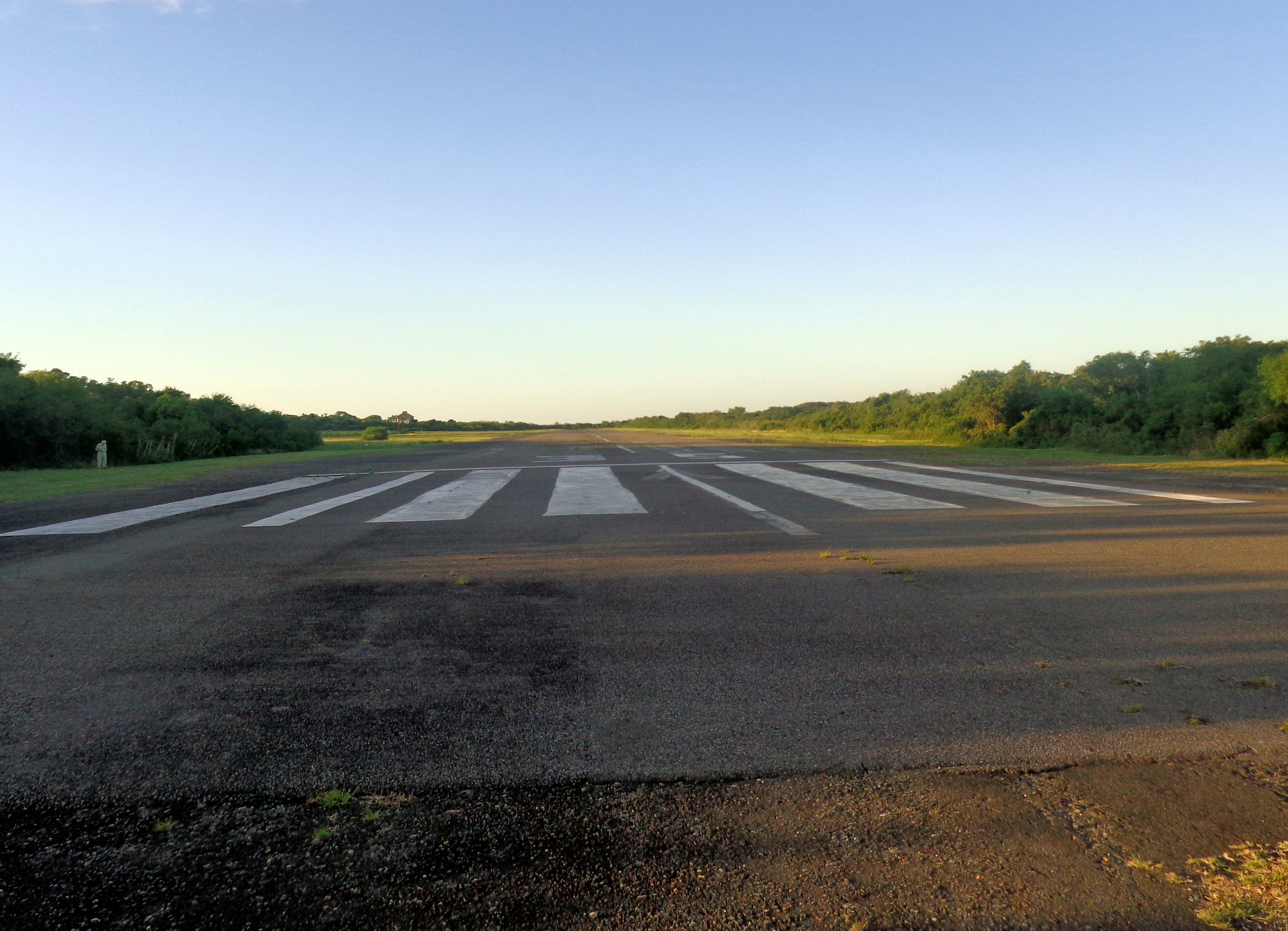
- IATA: none; ICAO: SAAK

Summary
- Airport type: Public
- Serves: Isla Martín García, Argentina
- Location: Río de la Plata estuary
- Elevation AMSL: 7 ft (2.1 m)
- Coordinates: 34°10′55″S 58°14′49″W

Map
- Location of the airport in Argentina

Runways
| Direction | Length | | Surface |
| Direction | m | ft | Surface |
|---|---|---|---|
| 17/35 | 1,260 | 4,134 | Asphalt |
- Source: WAD GCM

Martin Garcia Island Airport (Spanish: Aeropuerto de la Isla Martín García) (ICAO: SAAK) is the airport of Isla Martín García, a small Argentine island at the head of the Río de la Plata estuary, near the coast of Uruguay.

It features a small passenger terminal and a single long asphalt runway. Daily traffic consists of general aviation private and commercial (tourism) flights, especially on weekends.

Touch-and-go landings are not allowed due to noise abatement restrictions to protect the birds nesting in the wildlife preserve next to the airport.

== History ==
The island was placed under the jurisdiction of the Argentine Navy in 1886, and naval forces were stationed there. In the late 1920s an airstrip was built, the precursor of the Martín García Naval Air Station (Spanish: Estación Aeronaval Martín García); this was expanded in the 1950s to support heavier aircraft. The air station became Martín García Island Airport after jurisdiction was transferred to the Province of Buenos Aires.

== Facilities ==
The airport elevation is 7 feet (2 m) above mean sea level and it has one runway designated 17/35 which measures 1,260 by 30 metres (4,134 ft × 98 ft). All approach and departures are over the water. North approach and departure are over a noise-sensitive nature preserve. The immediate area around the island is Argentine airspace.

== See also ==
- Transport in Argentina
- List of airports in Argentina
