= Punta Gorda, Colonia =

Landform in Colonia, Uruguay

Coordinates: 33.9161°S 58.4144°W

Punta Gorda is a landform in Colonia Department, Uruguay.

According to the Treaty between Uruguay and Argentina concerning the Rio de la Plata and the Corresponding Maritime Boundary, it marks the mouths of the Uruguay River on the Río de la Plata.
