= Martín García Island =

Island territory of Argentina in the Río de la Plata

Isla Martín García
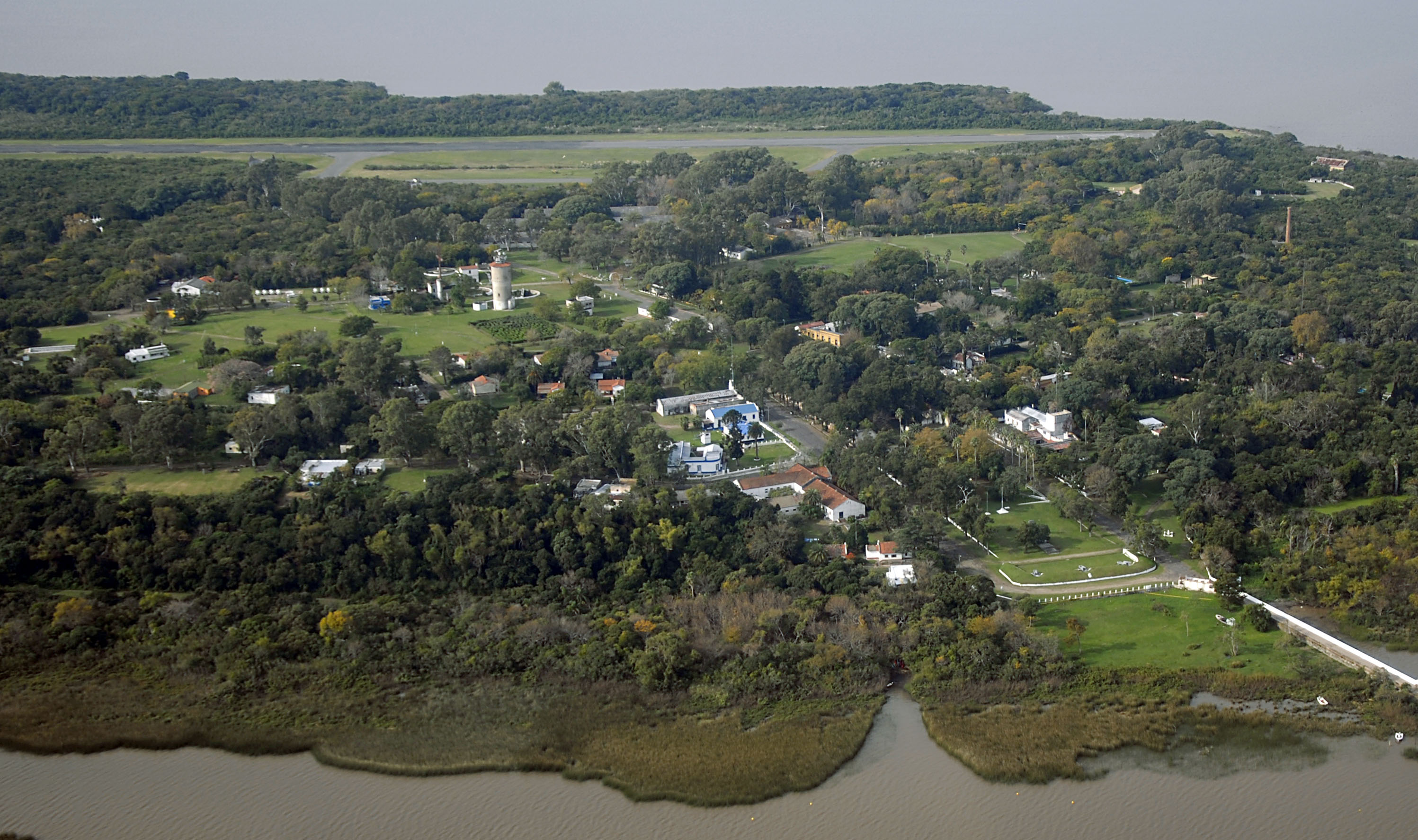
- Aerial photograph of Martín García Island from the west, with airstrip visible in background

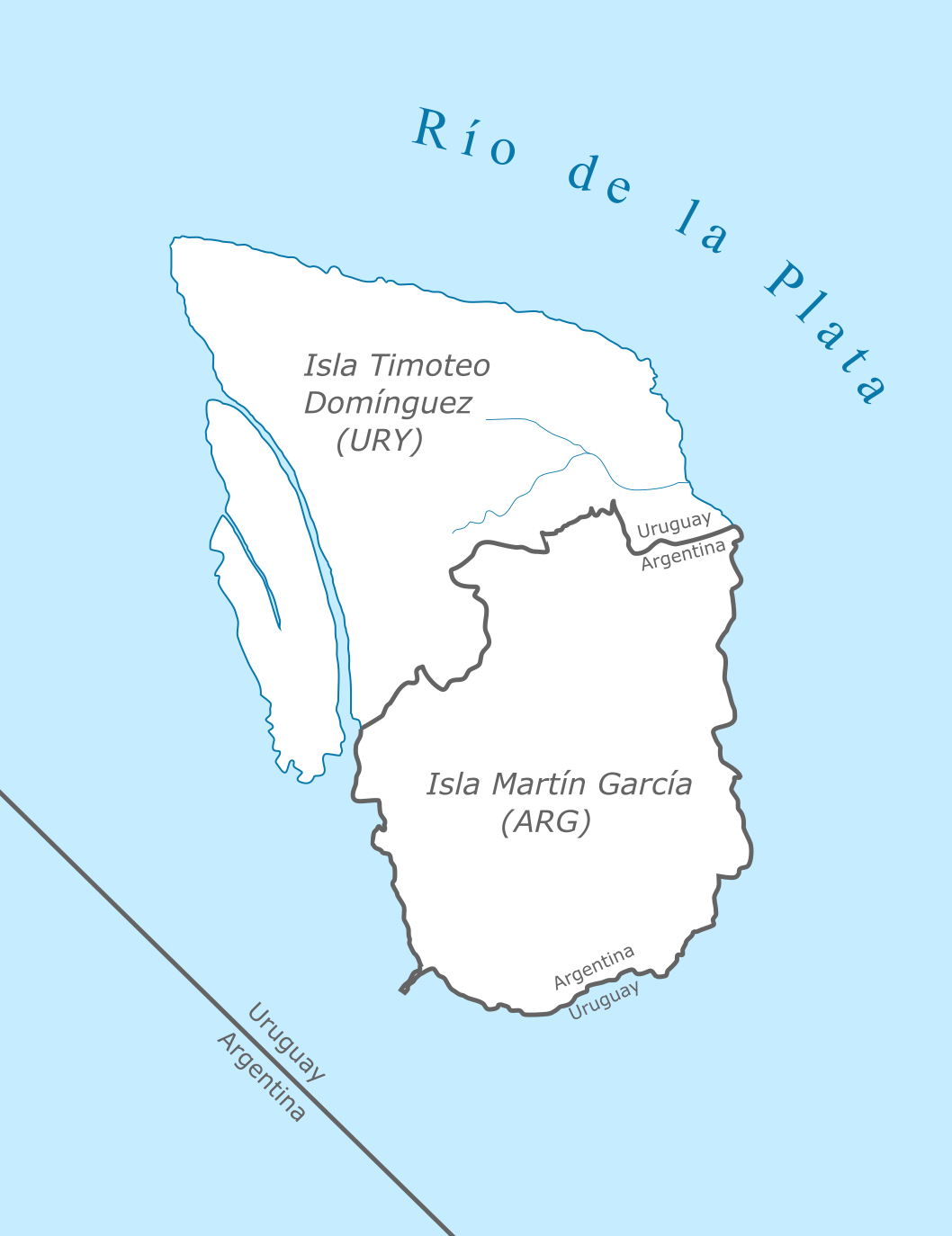
- Diagram of Martín García and Timoteo Domínguez Islands, after they were physically united in one land mass

Geography
- Location: Río de la Plata
- Coordinates: 34°10′57″S 58°15′00″W
- Area: 1.84 km^{2} (0.71 sq mi)
- Highest elevation: 27 m (89 ft)

Administration
- Argentina
- Province: Buenos Aires
- Partido: La Plata

Demographics
- Population: 150 (2008)

Martín García Island (Spanish: Isla Martín García) is the southern half of an island in the Río de la Plata. Martín García is in Uruguayan waters and was disputed between Argentina and Uruguay, but in 1973 they reached an agreement establishing it as Argentine territory to be used solely as a nature reserve. With an area of 1.84 km^{2} (0.71 sq mi), it has a permanent population of about 150 people (50 families), and falls within the jurisdiction of Buenos Aires Province. The island is accessible by air through Martín García Island Airport. The northern half of the island is known as Timoteo Domínguez and is Uruguayan territory; it emerged from the river as a sandbank in the 1960s and grew to merge with Martín García Island in the 1980s.

The historical island of Martín García was strategically located, and was the site of a fortification built in the 1820s by Argentine forces to deny the Brazilian navy access to the Uruguay River. This fort, named Constitución, succeeded in keeping Brazilian reinforcements at bay during the Battle of Juncal between 8 and 9 February 1827, allowing the Argentines to destroy the Brazilian squadron operating on the Uruguay River during the Cisplatine War.

Several Argentine political figures have been held under arrest at the island by military governments, including presidents Hipólito Yrigoyen (1930), Juan Perón (1945), and Arturo Frondizi (1962).

== History ==
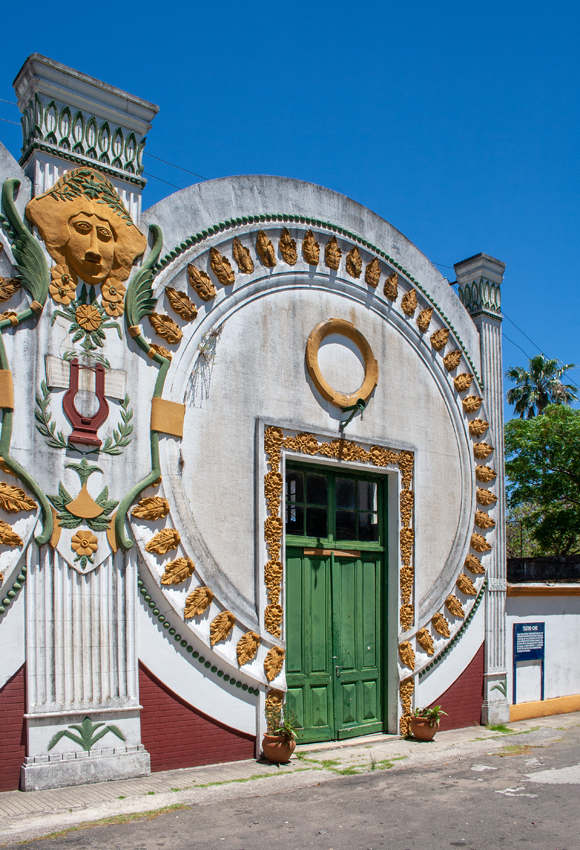
Elaborate entrance to the cinema

Martin Garcia Island was discovered by the Spanish in the expedition of Juan Díaz de Solís in 1516; it is named after the storekeeper Martín Garcia, who died on board and whose body was buried on the island. From that time, the island was continually disputed by Spain and Portugal due to its strategic position amidst the main river channel and as a gateway to its main tributaries, the Paraná and Uruguay rivers.

The island was used as a penal colony from 1765 until 1886. Developed by the Viceroyalty of the Río de la Plata, the first viceroy Pedro de Cevallos fortified the island and assigned a military garrison there. In 1814, Admiral William Brown, commanding a fleet, landed on the island and defeated the royalists, leaving Martin Garcia in the hands of the United Provinces of the Río de la Plata.

The island was the scene of other battles during the Argentine War of Independence, as well as during the Cisplatine War of the 1820s. In 1838, during the government of Buenos Aires Province Governor Juan Manuel de Rosas, Martín García was also attacked by Anglo-French forces. Later it was occupied by allied forces composed of Unitarian Party exiles in Montevideo. In 1843, it was recovered by federal troops of Rosas, who lost the post in 1845 to troops led by Giuseppe Garibaldi, who retook it for Montevideo. Its strategic value during the Argentine Civil Wars of the mid-19th century ended after Rosas was overthrown in the Battle of Caseros in 1852.

President Domingo Sarmiento proposed a base on the island in 1850, with Argirópolis City as the capital of a micro state administered jointly by Argentina, Uruguay and Paraguay.

Beginning in 1879, many indigenous peoples who were captured as part of the so-called Conquest of the Desert were confined on Martín García island. According to official documentation, these prisoners of war included combatants as well as noncombatants (including young children and the elderly). While on the island, many of the prisoners were compelled to work and were subject to discipline within the various institutions of the island. This has led some scholars to argue that Martín García was a concentration camp and a tool of genocide. Although there are no official numbers, researchers have estimated that as many as 3,000 indigenous prisoners passed through Martín García during the 1870s and 1880s.

The island was transferred to Argentine naval jurisdiction in 1886, and naval forces were placed in it. In the late 1920s, an airstrip was built, the precursor of the Martín García Naval Air Station (Spanish: Estación Aeronaval Martín García); this was expanded in the 1950s, and is currently the Martín García Island Airport.

Most of the German survivors of the SMS Cap Trafalgar rescued by the collier Eleonore Woermann in September 1914 and taken to Buenos Aires were interned for the duration of the war on the Argentine-controlled island. German sailors from the heavy cruiser Graf Spee were also interned on the island by Argentina in 1943.

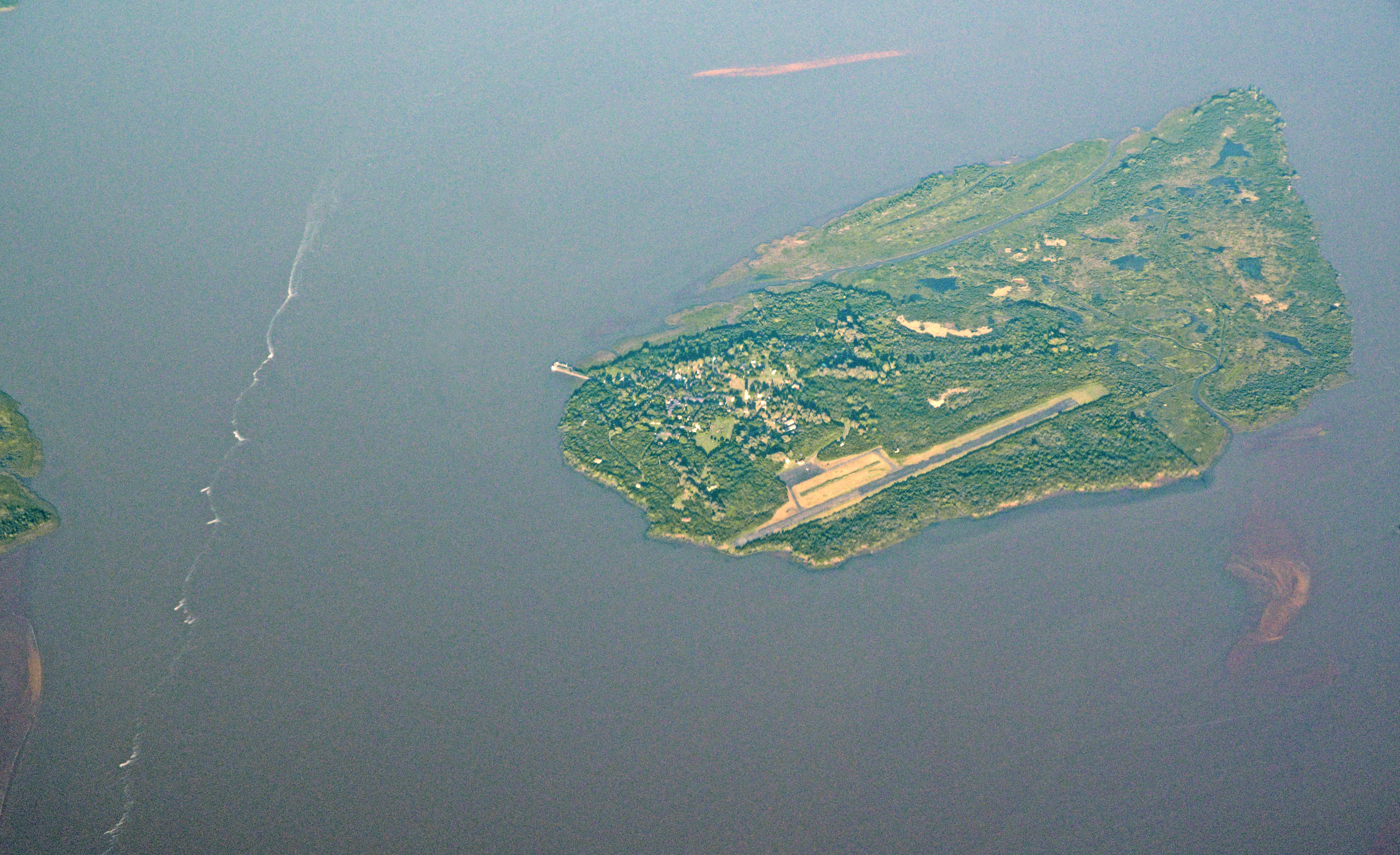
Aerial view of the island formed by (former) islands Martín García (Argentina) (bottom left), and Timoteo Domínguez (Uruguay) (top right), looking west (November 2019)

The jurisdictional status of the island was formally established by the Treaty of Río de la Plata between Argentina and Uruguay on November 19, 1973. This treaty stipulates that the Martín García Island is an Argentine exclave surrounded by Uruguayan waters. In return for recognition of Argentina's sovereignty over the island, Argentina made territorial concessions in the Río de la Plata, notably the cession of Juncal Island to Uruguay.

Article 45 of the treaty states:

The Martín García Island shall be exclusively destined as a natural reserve for the conservation and preservation of fauna and flora under jurisdiction of the Argentine Republic, without prejudice to the provisions of article 63

On the other hand, this treaty, in effect, defined its territorial limits. To the north of the island was Timoteo Domínguez, an island under Uruguayan jurisdiction, and this was recognised by Article 46 of the same treaty:

Should the Martín García Island in the future unite with another island, the corresponding boundary shall be delineated pursuant to the outline of the Martín García Island resulting from application of Chart H-118, covered in Article 41.

At the time of the treaty the channel between these islands comprised an enormous stream load which, since the date of the treaty, has effected a physical union of the Uruguayan island with Martín García. Thus, the boundary between Martín Garcia and Timoteo Domínguez has now become the only existing land frontier between the Republic of Argentina and the Oriental Republic of Uruguay.

Uruguayan officials have cited Article 45 on several occasions to prevent the use of the island by Argentina for purposes other than for the nature reserve. In 1985, the Navy transferred ownership of buildings and facilities in the island to the Province of Buenos Aires. Today, the island is a tourist destination. Among its notable sights are the old Chinatown, a center of immigrants; the remains of the fortifications, the prison infirmary, and the forest inhabited by red deer. The island is also well known for the baking of artisanal pastries.

== Flora and fauna ==
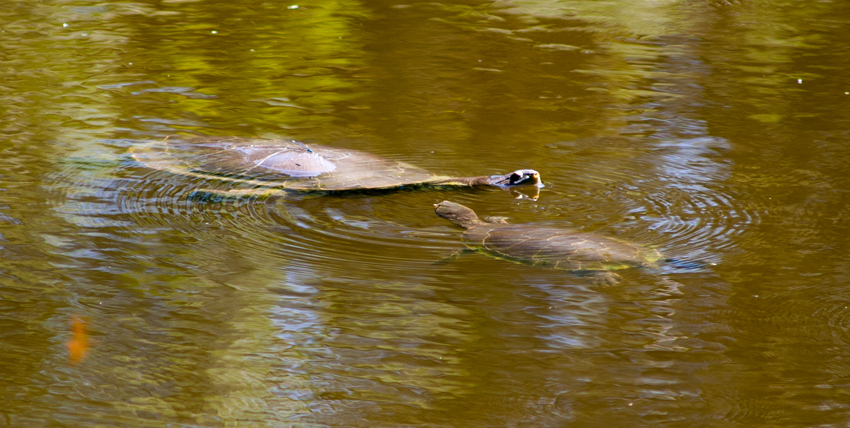
Turtles on Martin Garcia

The island's biome is that of forests, and its predominant species include the ceiba and the creole laurel, as well as xerophytic species (similar to the Gran Chaco) that include gorse, cacti, and lapachillo. The island's beaches are populated with reeds, fig trees (ibopehay), and more than 800 species of plants.

The median and greater wildlife, excluding fish, is composed at present mainly by over 250 bird species including eight species of hummingbirds, sparrowhawks, lapwings, herons, vultures, parrots, cardinals, pigeons, sparrows, finches, larks, pygmy owls (caburé), and great horned owls, among others. The island is also home to a variety of reptiles, lizards, geckos, turtles, frogs, coypu (or pseudonutrias), capybaras, alligators, red deer. The once-large population of giant river otters (ariray) was exterminated by the late 1950s.

== Climate ==
The average annual temperature is 17 °C (63 °F), and averages 8 °C (55 °F) in the winter, and 29 °C (84 °F) in the summer. Average annual precipitation is 1,000 mm (40 ").

Climate data for Martín García Island
Month	Jan	Feb	Mar	Apr	May	Jun	Jul	Aug	Sep	Oct	Nov	Dec	Year
Record high °C (°F)	35.7 (96.3)	38.0 (100.4)	35.0 (95.0)	33.6 (92.5)	28.0 (82.4)	25.5 (77.9)	25.5 (77.9)	26.0 (78.8)	29.0 (84.2)	30.0 (86.0)	34.0 (93.2)	37.0 (98.6)	38.0 (100.4)
Mean daily maximum °C (°F)	29.1 (84.4)	28.8 (83.8)	25.8 (78.4)	22.8 (73.0)	19.4 (66.9)	16.0 (60.8)	15.6 (60.1)	16.2 (61.2)	18.9 (66.0)	21.4 (70.5)	25.0 (77.0)	27.9 (82.2)	22.2 (72.0)
Daily mean °C (°F)	23.9 (75.0)	23.4 (74.1)	21.1 (70.0)	18.1 (64.6)	14.8 (58.6)	11.8 (53.2)	11.5 (52.7)	12.0 (53.6)	14.3 (57.7)	16.5 (61.7)	20.1 (68.2)	22.6 (72.7)	17.5 (63.5)
Mean daily minimum °C (°F)	18.8 (65.8)	18.5 (65.3)	16.3 (61.3)	13.0 (55.4)	11.1 (52.0)	8.0 (46.4)	8.0 (46.4)	8.3 (46.9)	10.3 (50.5)	12.6 (54.7)	14.9 (58.8)	17.9 (64.2)	13.1 (55.6)
Record low °C (°F)	10.0 (50.0)	10.0 (50.0)	8.0 (46.4)	6.0 (42.8)	2.0 (35.6)	−0.1 (31.8)	−0.1 (31.8)	1.0 (33.8)	−0.1 (31.8)	5.5 (41.9)	4.0 (39.2)	9.5 (49.1)	−0.1 (31.8)
Average precipitation mm (inches)	60 (2.4)	85 (3.3)	158 (6.2)	80 (3.1)	48 (1.9)	70 (2.8)	54 (2.1)	53 (2.1)	54 (2.1)	103 (4.1)	103 (4.1)	90 (3.5)	958 (37.7)
Average precipitation days	5	6	7	6	5	5	5	5	7	7	7	6	71
Average relative humidity (%)	67	68	72	75	78	81	81	79	76	75	71	68	74
Mean monthly sunshine hours	260.4	223.2	213.9	177.0	167.4	111.0	117.8	155.0	168.0	186.0	213.0	232.5	2,225.2
Percentage possible sunshine	59	59	56	53	52	38	38	46	47	46	51	52	50
Source: UNLP

== Population ==
Martín García once had an estimated population of 4,000, but it decreased when the military garrison was withdrawn. The stable population in 2008 is less than 170 people (about 50 families). They have an elementary school, the EGB nº 39 "Juan Díaz de Solís".

== See also ==
- Martín García canal dispute
- Martín García Lighthouse
