= Punta Gorda Airport =

Punta Gorda Airport may refer to:

- Punta Gorda Airport (Belize) in Punta Gorda, Belize
- Punta Gorda Airport (Florida) in Punta Gorda, Florida, United States
