= 1973 Boundary Treaty between Uruguay and Argentina =

1973 border demarcation treaty between Argentina and Uruguay

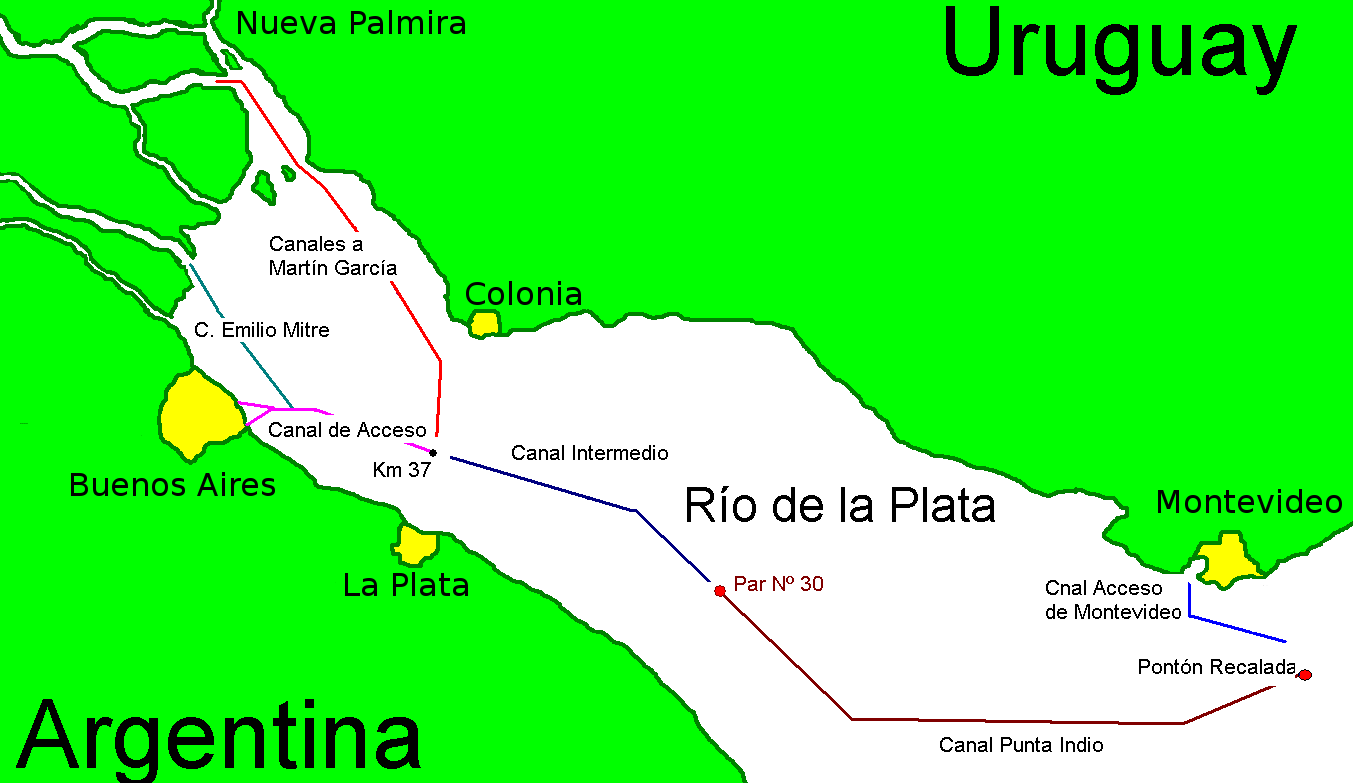
River Plate

The Treaty between Uruguay and Argentina concerning the Río de la Plata and the Corresponding Maritime Boundary was signed in Montevideo on 19 November 1973 by Dr. Juan Carlos Blanco Estradé, Minister for Foreign Affairs of Uruguay, and Mr. Alberto J. Vignes, Minister for Foreign Affairs and Worship of Argentina.

The treaty provides the geographical coordinates for the boundary points in the Rio de la Plata, affords the status of Martín García Island and other islands in the Río de la Plata, designates Martín García Island as the seat of an Administrative Commission for the Río de la Plata (Spanish: Comisión Administradora del Río de la Plata, CARP), and regulates the adjacent maritime front.

There are two kinds of zones in the Río de la Plata: the zones of exclusive jurisdiction and the zone of common jurisdiction. In zones considered to be of exclusive jurisdiction, each party may exert its authority without interference from the other. In the common zones these jurisdictions may be exercised concurrently and by the CARP. The inner waters of both countries are drawn intentionally to let the navigable waterways lie within the common zones.

This combined definition of the boundary led to the Martín García canal dispute and the Uruguay River pulp mill dispute.

== See also ==
- Río de la Plata
- Banco Inglés
