= Río de la Plata =

River or estuary in South America

Río de la Plata River Plate, La Plata River
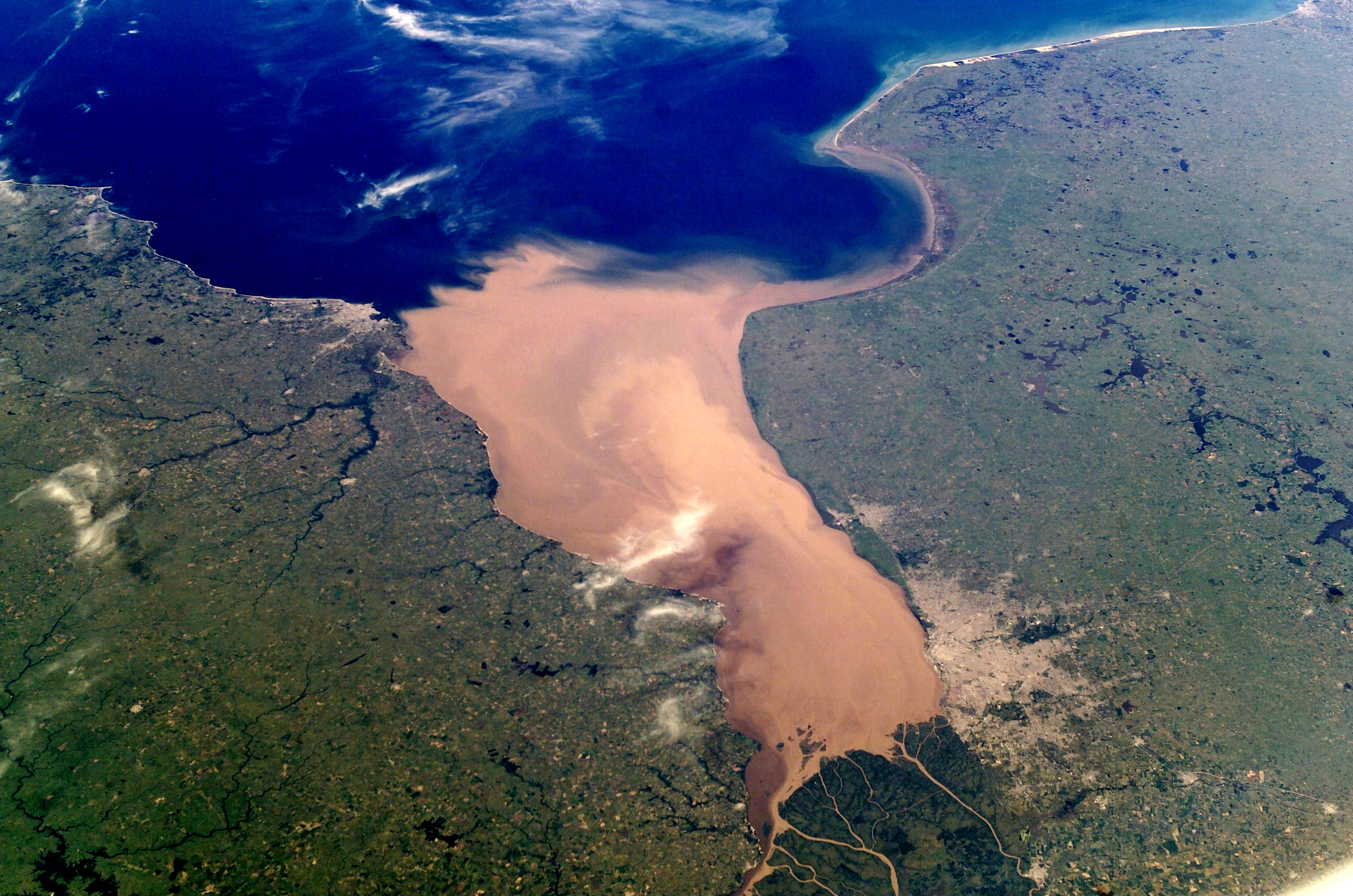
- NASA photo of the Río de la Plata looking from northwest to southeast. Buenos Aires is visible on the right bank near the Paraná River delta. River sediments turn its water brown as far as Montevideo, visible on the left bank at the outer estuary.

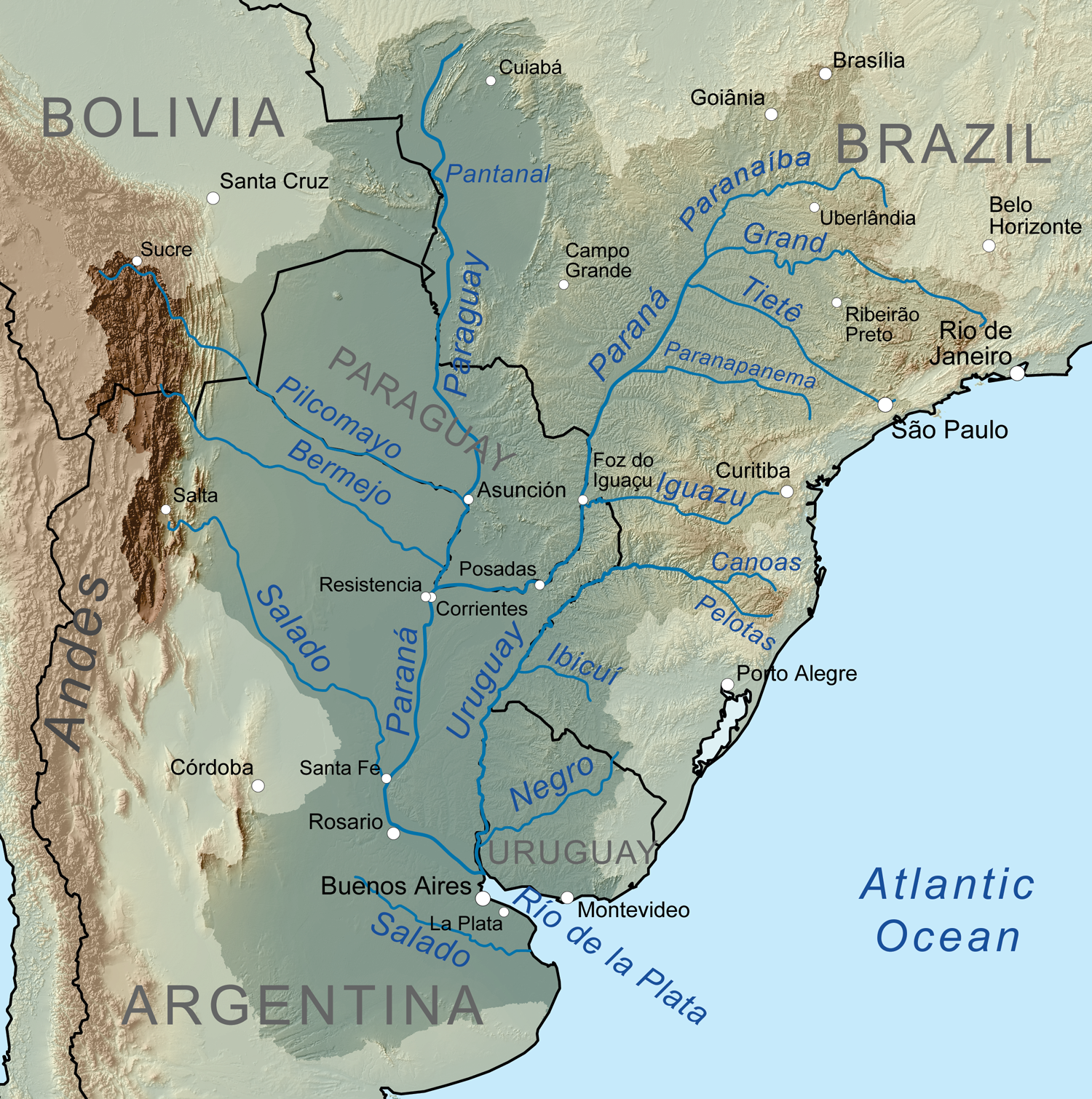
- Map of the Río de la Plata basin, showing the Río de la Plata at the mouths of the Paraná and Uruguay rivers, near Buenos Aires
- Etymology: Spanish for "river of silver"

Location
- Countries: Argentina and Uruguay
- Cities: Buenos Aires; Montevideo; La Plata; Quilmes; Colonia del Sacramento; San Isidro; Punta Lara; Vicente López; Avellaneda; San Fernando; Berazategui; Hudson; Atalaya; San Clemente del Tuyú; Ciudad del Plata; Ciudad de la Costa

Physical characteristics
- Source: Confluence of Paraná and Uruguay rivers
  - location: Argentina/Uruguay
  - coordinates: 34°0′5″S 58°23′37″W
- Mouth: Atlantic Ocean
  - location: Argentine Sea, Argentina
  - coordinates: 35°40′S 55°47′W
- Length: 290 km (180 mi) 4,876 km (3,030 mi) including the Paraná
- Basin size: 3,170,000 km^{2} (1,220,000 mi^{2}) 3,182,064 km^{2} (1,228,602 mi^{2})
- Discharge
  - location: Río de la Plata, Atlantic Ocean
  - average: (Period 1971-2010) 27,225 m^{3}/s (961,400 cu ft/s) 22,000 m^{3}/s (780,000 cu ft/s) 884 km^{3}/a (28,000 m^{3}/s)
  - minimum: 12,000 m^{3}/s (420,000 cu ft/s)
  - maximum: 50,000 m^{3}/s (1,800,000 cu ft/s)

Basin features
- Tributaries
  - left: Uruguay River, San Juan River, Santa Lucía River
  - right: Paraná River, Luján River, Salado River

The Río de la Plata (Spanish pronunciation: [ˈri.o ðe la ˈplata]; lit. 'River of Silver'), also called the River Plate or La Plata River in English, is the estuary formed by the confluence of the Uruguay River and the Paraná River at Punta Gorda. It empties into the Atlantic Ocean and forms a funnel-shaped indentation on the southeastern coastline of South America. Depending on the geographer, the Río de la Plata may be considered a river, an estuary, a gulf, or a marginal sea. If considered a river, it is the widest in the world, with a maximum width of 220 kilometres (140 mi).

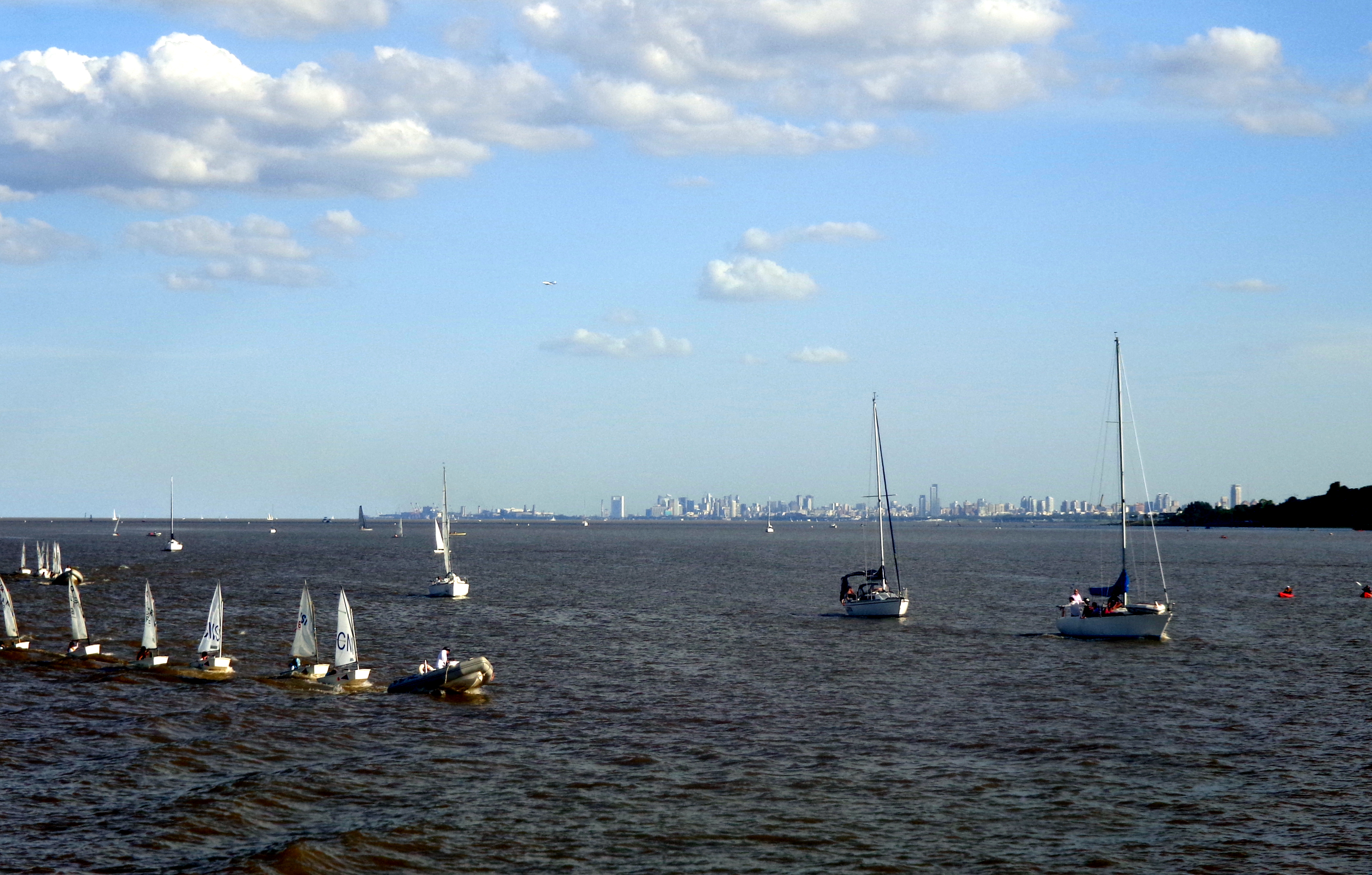
Río de la Plata in Argentina

The river is about 290 kilometres (180 mi) long and widens from about 2 kilometres (1.2 mi) at its source to about 220 kilometres (140 mi) at its mouth. It forms part of the border between Argentina and Uruguay. The name Río de la Plata is also used to refer to the populations along the estuary, especially the main port cities of Buenos Aires and Montevideo, where Rioplatense Spanish is spoken and tango culture developed. The coasts of the river are the most densely populated areas of Uruguay and Argentina, and 2.5 million people yearly travel across the River Plate.

== Name ==
The name Río de la Plata ("River of Silver") was adopted because of a myth that the region around the river basin contained vast amounts of silver. This is also why the country is named Argentina (meaning loosely "silvery land").

The English name River Plate was adopted using the archaic term plate, meaning "silver".

== Geography ==
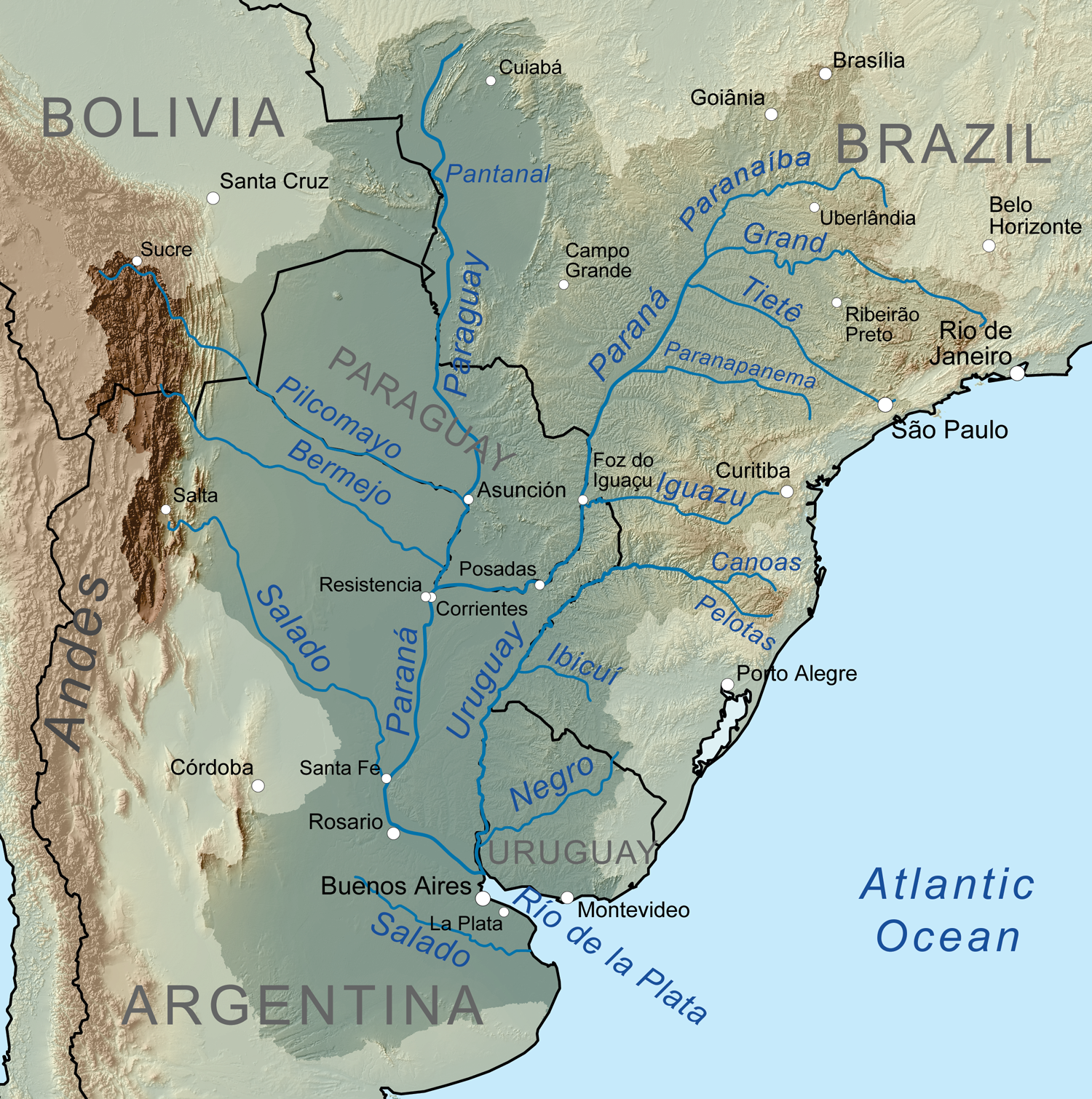
Map with tributaries of Río de la Plata

The Río de la Plata begins at the confluence of the Uruguay and Paraná rivers at Punta Gorda and flows eastward into the South Atlantic Ocean. No clear physical boundary marks the river's eastern end; the International Hydrographic Organization defines the eastern boundary of the Río de la Plata as "a line joining Punta del Este, Uruguay and Cabo San Antonio, Argentina".

Though it is generally spoken of as a river, the Río de la Plata is considered by some geographers to be a large bay or marginal sea of the Atlantic Ocean. For those who regard it as a river, it is the widest in the world, with a maximum width of about 220 kilometres (140 mi) and a total surface area of about 35,000 square kilometres (14,000 sq mi).

=== Islands and shoals ===
The upper river contains several islands, including Oyarvide Island and the Solís Islands in Argentine waters and Juncal Island, Islote el Matón, Martín García Island and Timoteo Domínguez Island in Uruguayan waters. Because of deposition of sediments from the heavy stream load carried down from the river's tributaries, the islands in the Río de la Plata generally grow over time.

A submerged shoal, the Barra del Indio, divides the Río de la Plata into an inner freshwater riverine portion and an outer brackish estuarine portion. The shoal is located approximately between Montevideo and Punta Piedras (the northwest end of Samborombón Bay). The inner fluvial zone is about 180 kilometres (110 mi) long and up to 80 kilometres (50 mi) wide, with a depth which varies from about 1 to 5 metres (3.3 to 16.4 ft); the depth of the outer estuary zone increases from 5 to 25 metres (16 to 82 ft). The river's discharge is strong enough to prevent saltwater from penetrating to the inner portion.

== Hydrology ==
The Río de la Plata behaves as an estuary in which freshwater and seawater mix. The freshwater comes principally from the Paraná River (one of the world's longest rivers and La Plata's main tributary) as well as from the Uruguay River and other smaller streams. Currents in the Río de la Plata are dominated by tides reaching to its sources and beyond, into the Uruguay and Paraná rivers. Both rivers are tidally influenced for about 190 kilometres (120 mi). The tidal ranges in the Río de la Plata are small, but its great width allows for a tidal prism important enough to dominate the flow regime despite the huge discharge received from the tributary rivers.

The river is a salt wedge estuary in which saltwater, being denser than freshwater, penetrates into the estuary in a layer below the freshwater, which floats on the surface. Salinity fronts, or haloclines, form at the bottom and on the surface, where fresh and brackish waters meet. The salinity fronts are also pycnoclines due to the water density discontinuities. They play an important role in the reproductive processes of fish species.

=== Drainage basin ===
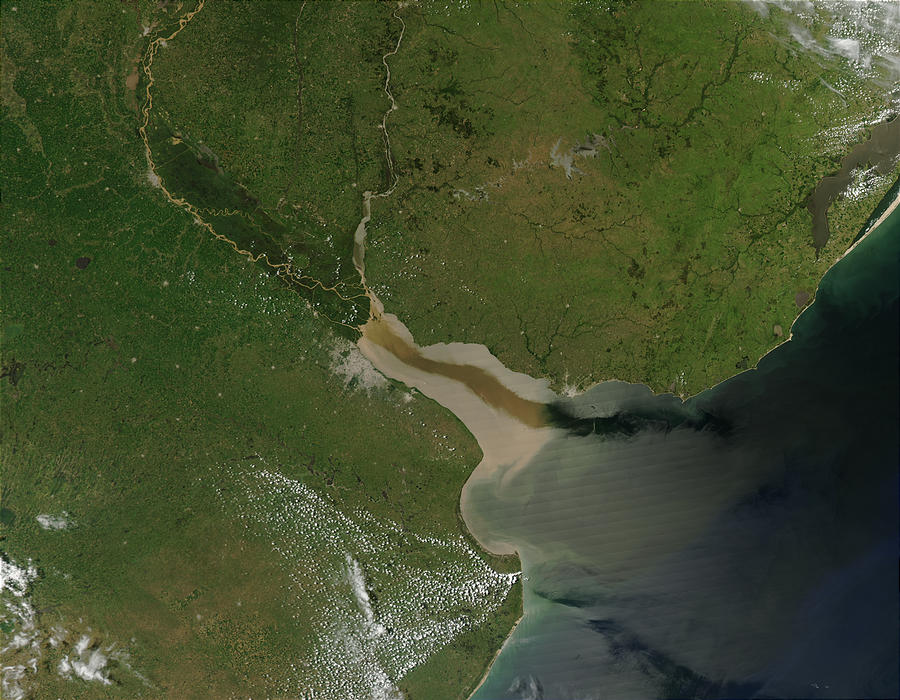
Satellite image of the Paraná and Uruguay rivers emptying into the Río de la Plata. Due to the relatively calm surface of the estuary and the angle of the Sun relative to the satellite, the current of the river flowing out into the Atlantic is visible.

The Río de la Plata's drainage basin (sometimes called the Platine basin or Platine region) is the 3,170,000 km^{2} (1,220,000 mi^{2})-3,182,064 km^{2} (1,228,602 mi^{2}) hydrographical area that drains to the Río de la Plata. It includes areas of southeastern Bolivia, southern and central Brazil, the entire country of Paraguay, most of Uruguay, and northern Argentina. Making up about one fourth of the continent's surface, it is the second largest drainage basin in South America (after the Amazon basin) and one of the largest in the world.

=== Tributaries ===
The main rivers of the La Plata basin are the Paraná River, the Paraguay River (the Paraná's main tributary), and the Uruguay River.

The Paraná River's main tributaries include the Paranaíba River, Grande River, Tietê River, Paranapanema River, Iguazu River, Paraguay River, and the Salado River, after which it ends in the large Paraná Delta. The Paraguay River flows through the Pantanal wetland, after which its main tributaries include the Pilcomayo River and the Bermejo River, before it ends in the Paraná. The Uruguay's main tributaries include the Pelotas River, Canoas River, Ibicuí River, and the Río Negro. Another significant tributary to the Río de la Plata is the Salado del Sur River.

== History ==
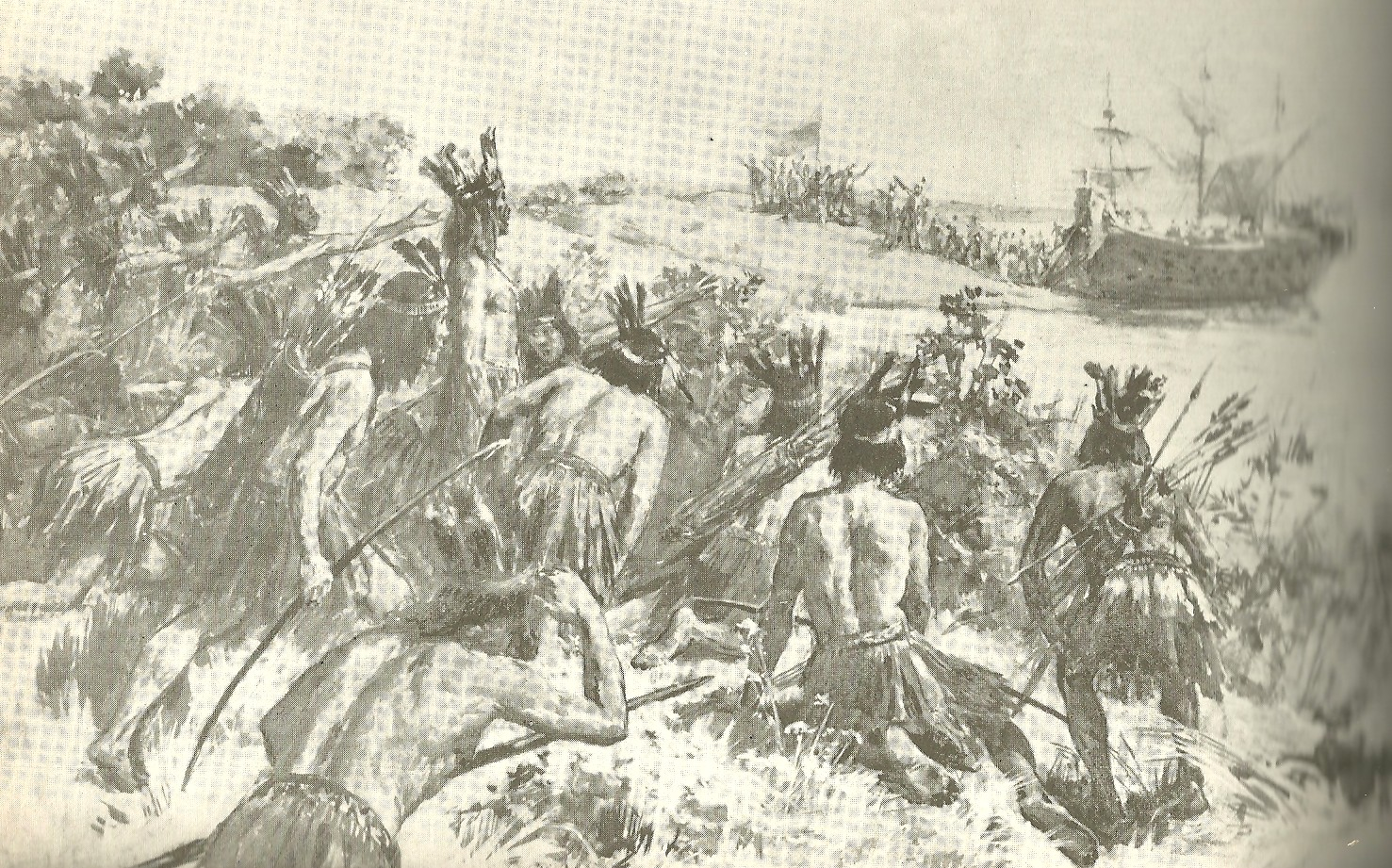
Discovery of the Río de la Plata by Juan Díaz de Solís. He would be attacked and killed by Charrúas later.

=== Indigenous people ===
Nomadic aboriginal people inhabited the Río de la Plata region for thousands of years before European settlers arrived, and their descendants continue to live in the region to this day.

=== European exploration ===
The Río de la Plata was first explored by the Portuguese in 1512–13. The Spanish first explored it in 1516, when the navigator Juan Díaz de Solís traversed it during his search for a passage between the Atlantic and the Pacific Oceans, calling it the Mar Dulce, or "freshwater sea". The Portuguese navigator Ferdinand Magellan briefly explored the estuary in 1520 before his expedition continued its circumnavigation, and in 1521, Cristóvão Jacques also explored the Plate River estuary and ascended the Parana River for the first time, entering it for about 23 leagues (110 km) to near the present city of Rosario.

Explorer Sebastian Cabot made a detailed study of the river and its tributaries and gave it its modern name. He explored the Paraná and Uruguay rivers between 1526 and 1529, ascending the Paraná as far as the present-day city of Asunción, and also explored up the Paraguay River. Cabot acquired silver trinkets trading with the Guaraní near today's Asunción, and these objects (together with legends of a "Sierra de la Plata" in the South American interior brought back by earlier explorers) inspired him to rename the river "Río de la Plata" ("River of Silver").

The first European colony was the city of Buenos Aires, founded by Pedro de Mendoza on 2 February 1536. This settlement, however, was quickly abandoned; the failure to establish a settlement on the estuary led to explorations upriver and the founding of Asunción in 1537. The area was visited by Francis Drake's fleet in early 1578, in the early stages of his circumnavigation. Buenos Aires was re-founded by Juan de Garay on 11 June 1580.

=== Colonial period ===
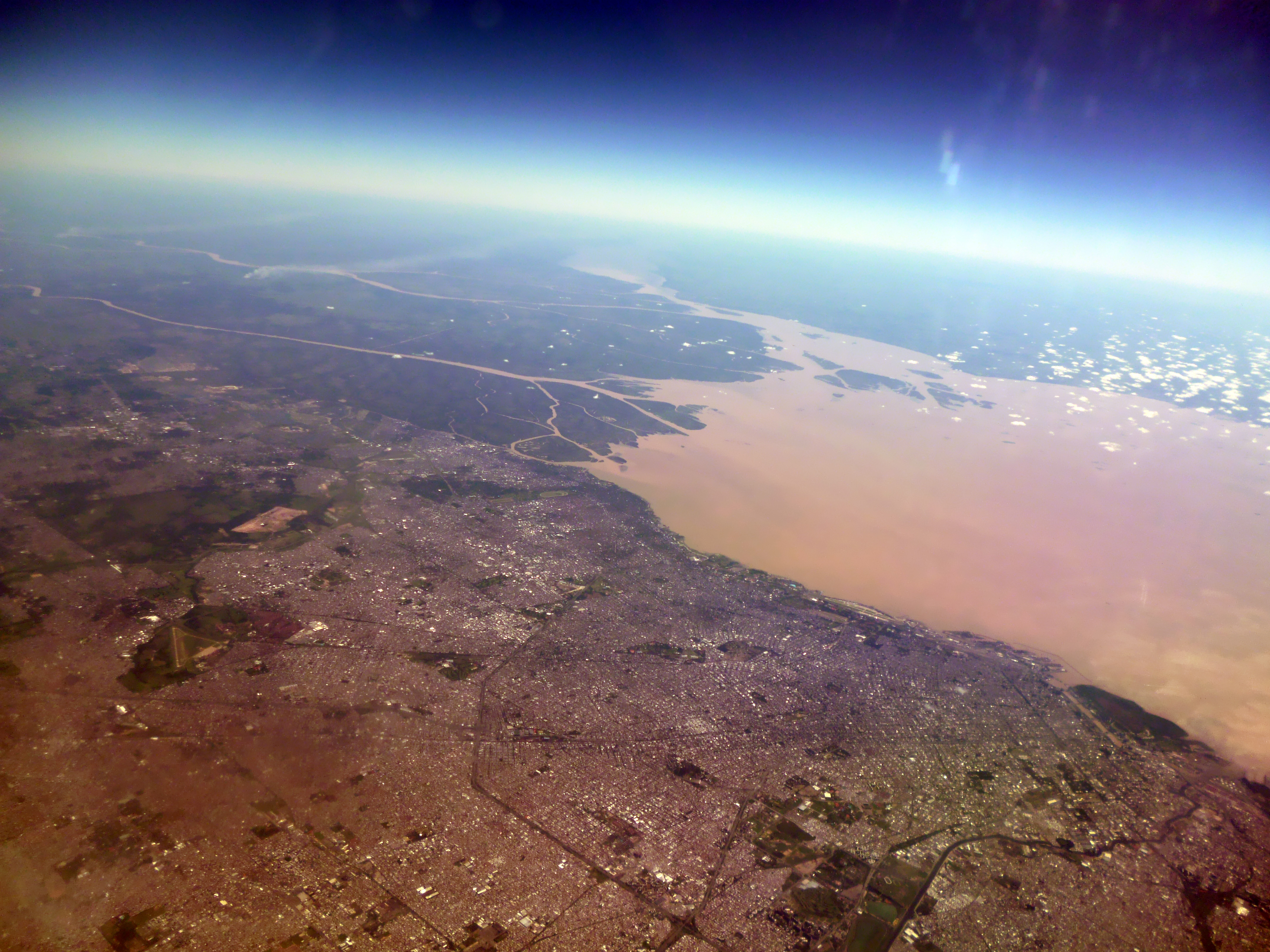
The Buenos Aires Metropolitan Area runs along the southern coast of the Río de la Plata.

During the colonial era, the Río de la Plata was made the center of the Governorate of the Río de la Plata. The Río de la Plata region, particularly Buenos Aires, was a significant site of trade throughout the 17th century. The Crown initially intended Buenos Aires to be a military establishment for the protection of the Potosí mines, but it soon became evident that a settlement large enough to provide military defense would attract trade. The primary export was silver from the mines of Potosí, and imports generally included European luxury goods, slaves, and sugar. This trade occurred outside of the fleet system authorized by the Spanish Crown, and therefore was generally considered "illicit". However, under the monarchy of the Spanish Habsburgs, the line between licit and illicit trade was quite blurry. Crown officials and military outposts in Buenos Aires often relied upon profits from illicit trade to support their administrative structures.

Under the Bourbon monarchy, the governorate was elevated to the Viceroyalty of the Río de la Plata in 1776. This occurred as a result of the Bourbon Reforms, which attempted to restore the decaying wealth of the Spanish Crown. The reforms elevated the status of trade along the Río de la Plata and expanded what constituted "legal" trade so that the Crown could tax trade which had previously been "contraband". However, the plan did not go as intended. Although trade along the Río de la Plata flourished, very little silver was actually remitted to the Crown. Then, Spanish war with Britain and the simultaneous eruption of revolts in the mining regions of Peru led to a shortage of silver, putting strain on the merchant class of Buenos Aires. This caused a schism between merchants who wanted to try to continue reviving the Spanish Empire through silver trade and those who wanted to move on from silver and prioritize agricultural exports, ultimately tearing at the fabric of the Río de la Plata region's relationship with the Spanish Empire.

In 1806 and 1807 the river was the scene of an important British invasion that aimed to occupy the area and was defeated by the local garrison and population.

=== Revolutionary period ===
Conflict in the region intensified after the independence of the former Spanish and Portuguese colonies in the first quarter of the 19th century. Interests in the territories and the navigation rights over the Platine region played a major role in many armed conflicts throughout the century, including the Argentine civil wars, the Cisplatine and Platine wars, and the Paraguayan War. The river was blockaded by Brazil from 1826 to 1828, by the French from 1838 to 1840 and by an Anglo-French alliance from 1845 to 1850.

=== Cisplatine War ===
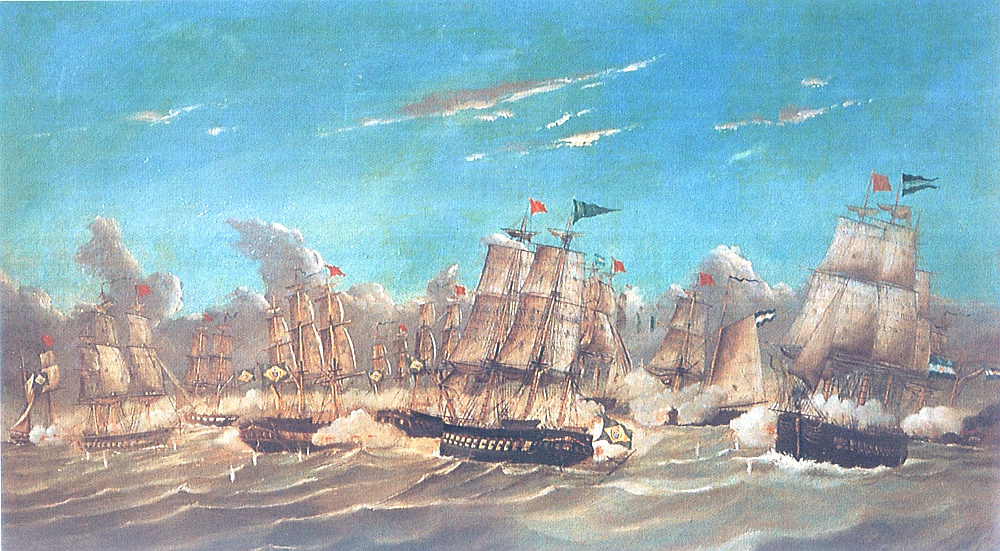
The battle of Punta Colares, by José Murature.

During the Cisplatine War, the Río de la Plata was blockaded by the Imperial Brazilian Navy, aiming to cripple Argentine finances and resupply their positions in Colonia del Sacramento and Montevideo. Squadrons of the newly independent United Provinces of the River Plate, led by the Irish-Argentine admiral William Brown attempted to break the blockade despite numerical inferiority.

==== Battle of Punta Colares (1826) ====
In the first major naval engagement of the war, an Argentine squadron left port in the early hours of February 9 to challenge the blockade. The battle was inconclusive, with the Argentine fleet breaking contact and the Brazilian admiral failing to give chase.

==== Battle of Quilmes (1826) ====
In July 29, a Brazilian fleet led by the English admiral James Norton engaged Brown's fleet near Ensenada. Norton split his force, catching the Argentine line between two fires and causing significant casualties. William Brown's flagship, the frigate 25 de Mayo, sank after the battle as a result of the damage received.

==== Battle of Juncal (1827) ====
In 8–9 February, an Argentine fleet led by Brown engaged the Third Division of the Imperial Navy on the Uruguay River, inflicting heavy casualties against a disorganized Brazilian squadron. The Argentines routed the Third Division, capturing or destroying fifteen Brazilian vessels whilst losing none and frustrating the Brazilian attempt to control the Uruguay river.

==== Battle of Monte Santiago (1827) ====
Near the coast of Ensenada in April 7, four Argentine vessels led by Brown slipped out of port in an unsuccessful attempt to surprise a large Brazilian fleet under the command of Norton. Two brigs were sunk, and a schooner was heavily damaged, resulting in a decisive Brazilian victory that ensured the Imperial blockade of the Río de la Plata until the Preliminary Peace Convention of 1828.

The blockade caused serious problems to the export-oriented economy of Buenos Aires but indirectly contributed to rural provinces such as Córdoba, allowing producers to sell native products to Buenos Aires at an increased price.

=== World War II ===
==== Battle of the River Plate (1939) ====
In the first naval battle of the Second World War the German pocket battleship Admiral Graf Spee was engaged by the Royal Navy (RN) cruisers HMS Exeter and Ajax, and the Royal New Zealand Navy cruiser Achilles, off the estuary of the River Plate in December 1939. The German ship retired up the estuary with a crippled fuel system and put into port at Montevideo. A few days later, rather than fight when believing himself outgunned, her captain scuttled her in the estuary. This engagement was part of the early Battle of the Atlantic.

== English names ==
The historical English name "River Plate" uses an old sense of the word "plate", which was used extensively as a term for "silver" or "gold" from the 12th century onwards, especially in Early Modern English. The estuary has been known as the River Plate or Plate River in English since at least the time of Francis Drake. This English version of the name served as an inspiration for one of Argentina's most important football clubs, Club Atlético River Plate.

A more literal translation of the name is "Silver River", though this is virtually never used in practice.

== Fauna ==
The Río de la Plata is a habitat for the loggerhead sea turtle, green sea turtle, leatherback sea turtle, the rare La Plata dolphin, and many species of fish.

== See also ==
- Rioplatense Spanish
- Argentina–Uruguay relations
- 1973 Boundary Treaty between Uruguay and Argentina
- The Fontana dei Quattro Fiumi, in Rome's Piazza Navona, contains a figure representing the River Plate.
- 1888 Río de la Plata earthquake

== Bibliography ==
- Mulhall, Michael George, and; Mulhall, Edward T. (1869). "Handbook of the River Plate: Comprising Buenos Ayres, the Upper Provinces, Banda Oriental, Paraguay".
- Bethell, Leslie (1987). Colonial Brazil. Cambridge: Cambridge University Press. ISBN 0-521-34127-2.
- Viana, Hélio (1994). História do Brasil: período colonial, monarquia e república (in Portuguese) (15 ed.). São Paulo: Melhoramentos. ISBN 978-85-06-01999-3.
- Piola, A. R.; Matano, R. P.; Palma, E. D.; Campos, E. D. (2005). "The influence of the Plata River discharge on the western South Atlantic shelf" (PDF). Geophysical Research Letters. 32 (1): L01603. Bibcode:2005GeoRL..32.1603P. doi:10.1029/2004GL021638.
- Real, Walter. España en el Río de la Plata: Descubrimiento y Poblamientos (1516–1588). Montevideo: Club Español. 2001. ISBN 9974-39-317-5.
- Simionato, Claudia G.; Vera, Carolina S.; Siegismund, Frank (2005). "Surface Wind Variability on Seasonal and Interannual Scales Over Río de la Plata Area". Journal of Coastal Research. 21 (4): 770–78. doi:10.2112/008-NIS.1. hdl:11336/194156. S2CID 131049528.
