= List of Uruguayan architects =

Following is a list of notable architects from the country of Uruguay.

== A ==
- Luis Andreoni (1853–1936) – Italian; worked in Montevideo
- Mariano Arana (born 1933) – mayor of Montevideo (1995–2005), Minister of Housing (2005–2008), architectural historian
- Leopoldo Artucio (1903–1976) – architectural historian
- Juan María Aubriot (1876–1930)

== B ==
- Alfredo Baldomir (1884–1938) – President of the Republic (1938–1942)
- Francisco Beltrame (born 1952) – Minister of Housing (2012-2015)
- Antoni Bonet i Castellana (1913–1989) – Catalan; worked in Uruguay

== C ==
- Joseph Carré (1870–1941) – French; worked in Uruguay
- Mauricio Cravotto (1893–1962)

== D ==
- Eladio Dieste (1917–2000) – his Church of Atlántida (1960) is a World Heritage Site

== E ==
- Rosario Etchebarne

== F ==
- Juan Carlos Figari (1893–1927)
- Román Fresnedo Siri (1903–1975)
- Charna Furman (born 1941)

== G ==
- Luis García Pardo (1910-2006)
- Camille Gardelle (1866–1947) – Catalan; worked in Uruguay
- Juan Giuria (1880–1957) – architectural historian
- Julia Guarino (1897-1985) – first woman architect graduated in Uruguay

== J ==
- Alfredo Jones Brown (1876-1950)

== L ==
- César Loustau (1926–2011) – architectural historian
- Aurelio Lucchini (died 1989) – architectural historian

== M ==
- Jorge Majfud (born 1969)
- Vittorio Meano (1860–1904) – Italian; worked in Montevideo
- Graciela Muslera (born 1963) – first female Minister of Housing in Uruguay

== O ==
- Miguel Ángel Odriozola (1921-2003)
- Carlos Ott (born 1946)

== P ==
- Mario Palanti (1885–1978) – Italian; worked in Montevideo
- Bernardo Poncini (1814-1874) – Swiss-Italian; worked in Montevideo

== R ==
- Víctor Rabú (1834–1907) – French; worked in Uruguay
- William Rey Ashfield (born 1959)

== S ==
- Juan Antonio Scasso (1892–1973)
- Gustavo Scheps (born 1954)

== T ==
- Horacio Terra Arocena (1894–1985)
- Juan Pablo Terra Gallinal (1924–1991)

== V ==
- Héctor Vigliecca (born 1940)
- Julio Vilamajó (1894–1948)
- Rafael Viñoly (born 1944)

== Y ==
- Cheung-Koon Yim (1936–2025) – Chinese; studied, worked and lectured in Uruguay

== Z ==
- Carlo Zucchi (1789–1849) – Italian; worked in Uruguay

== See also ==
- Culture of Uruguay
- List of architects
- List of Uruguayans
