= List of World Heritage Sites in Uruguay =

Location of World Heritage Sites in Uruguay

The United Nations Educational, Scientific and Cultural Organization (UNESCO) World Heritage Sites are places of importance to cultural or natural heritage as described in the UNESCO World Heritage Convention, established in 1972. Cultural heritage consists of monuments (such as architectural works, monumental sculptures, or inscriptions), groups of buildings, and sites (including archaeological sites). Natural heritage consists of natural features (physical and biological formations), geological and physiographical formations (including habitats of threatened species of animals and plants), and natural sites which are important from the point of view of science, conservation, or natural beauty. Uruguay accepted the UNESCO World Heritage Convention on 9 March 1989, making its historical sites eligible for inclusion on the list.

There are three World Heritage Sites in Uruguay, and a further six on the tentative list. The first site listed was the Historic Quarter of the City of Colonia del Sacramento, at the 19th session of the World Heritage Committee, held in Berlin, Germany, in 1995. The most recent site listed was the work of engineer Eladio Dieste: Church of Atlántida, in 2021. All three sites are listed for their cultural significance.

== World Heritage Sites ==
UNESCO lists sites under ten criteria; each entry must meet at least one of the criteria. Criteria i through vi are cultural, and vii through x are natural.

World Heritage Sites
Site	Image	Location (department)	Year listed	UNESCO data	Description
Historic Quarter of the City of Colonia del Sacramento	City walls in stone with a draw bridge	Colonia	1995	747; iv (cultural)	The city was founded in 1680 by the Portuguese on the strategic position on the shore of the Río de la Plata. It was the site of a long and bloody border dispute between Portugal and Spain, frequently changing hands. This is reflected in a fusion of Portuguese and Spanish influences. The city has a free plan (as opposed to the grid plan that was used in Spanish colonial cities), cobbled streets, parks and squares. Houses are modest and typically single-storied.
Fray Bentos Industrial Landscape	Historical photograph of a canning facility with a refrigerator and stacks of canned meat	Río Negro	2015	1464; ii, iv (cultural)	The industrial complex developed around a meat processing factory that was founded in 1859. One of the companies at the site was the Liebig's Extract of Meat Company which produced canned meat and meat extracts for European markets, while the Anglo Meat Packing Plant (historical facilities pictured) exported frozen meat. Factories attracted immigrant workers from over 50 countries. The industrial landscape comprises cattle pastures, factories, port infrastructure, residential buildings, and green spaces.
The work of engineer Eladio Dieste: Church of Atlántida	A modernist church building in brick with an adjacent bell tower	Canelones	2021	1612; iv (cultural)	The church, designed by the Uruguayan engineer Eladio Dieste (1917-2000) and inaugurated in 1960, is a prominent example of modern architecture of the second half of the 20th century in Latin America. The church, the bell tower, and the baptistery are all built in exposed brick. They feature technical innovations by Dieste, including the Gaussian vaults, efficient and economical thin-shelled barrel vaults for the church roof. The church combines the vernacular traditions of Latin America with modern engineering approaches.

== Tentative list ==
In addition to sites inscribed on the World Heritage List, member states can maintain a list of tentative sites that they may consider for nomination. Nominations for the World Heritage List are only accepted if the site was previously listed on the tentative list. Uruguay has six properties on its tentative list.

Tentative sites
Site	Image	Location (department)	Year listed	UNESCO criteria	Description
Chamangá A Rock Paintings Area	Landscape with low grass and some rocks	Flores	2005	iii (cultural)	The archaeological area around Chamangá contains sites with rock art. The pictographs that have different geometric motifs, are found on assemblies of granite blocks that are common in the area. The pictographs were estimated to be around two thousand years old. Other archeological material, such as pottery and polished lithic materials, have been found on the site.
Insular area and bay of Colonia del Sacramento	Look at the riverfront from the river side, some houses and an art sculpture on the shore	Colonia	2005	iv, v (cultural)	This is a proposed extension to the existing World Heritage Site. It highlights the maritime history of the area, with port and bastion infrastructure in the city and on the nearby San Gabriel Island. There are also numerous shipwrecks from different periods in the surrounding waters.
Rambla of Montevideo	A night view of a grand hotel building from the 1920s	Montevideo	2005	ii, iv, v, vi (cultural)	The Rambla is a coastal avenue along the Río de la Plata in Montevideo. It stretches over 22 km (14 mi) in length and acts as a public space used for socializing and sports. There are beaches and fishing spots along the shore. Numerous buildings from different periods are situated along the avenue, with modern architecture featuring prominently. The Hotel Carrasco is pictured.
Modern architecture of the 20th century of the City of Montevideo	Aerial view of Montevideo with many skyscrapers	Montevideo	2010	ii, iv (cultural)	This nomination comprises ensembles of historic buildings and urban areas, such as the Rambla of Montevideo and Parque Batlle, in Montevideo. The architecture reflects the trends roughly between 1915 and 1965, with styles such as Art Deco and International Style represented. There are clear influences of some of the most prominent architects of the 20th century visible, demonstrating a rich exchange of ideas.
Peñarol District: the historic Old Town and the industrial railway landscape	Street with some fences and houses covered by vines	Montevideo	2014	ii, iii, iv (cultural)	The district developed at the end of the 19th century when the Central Uruguay Railway company moved their train station and workshops there. It developed into a factory city, centred on the railways, with residences for management, houses for worker, workshops, and recreational areas. In the 1970s and 1980s, the area witnessed a transition to a post-industrial society.
Isla de Flores Cultural Landscape and its fluvio-marine context	Historic lighthouse building and a modern navy ship in front	Montevideo	2015	ii, iv (cultural)	The island, located off the shore from Montevideo, had no permanent residents until the early 19th century. Then it served as a quarantine station for numerous immigrants arriving to America. Following the outbreaks of cholera and yellow fever in the city, a sanatorium was constructed on the island in the 1860s. The historic lighthouse is pictured.
