= San Carlos Borromeo y Nuestra Señora de la Asunción, Montevideo =

Roman Catholic parish church in Prado, Montevideo, Uruguay

Coordinates: 34°52′0.54253″S 56°11′33.00922″W

San Carlos Borromeo y Nuestra Señora de la Asunción

Religion
- Affiliation: Roman Catholic
- Ecclesiastical or organizational status: Parish church
- Year consecrated: 1956

Location
- Location: Av. Millán 3307; Montevideo, Uruguay
- Interactive map of San Carlos Borromeo y Nuestra Señora de la Asunción

Architecture
- Architect: Juan Pablo Terra
- Type: Church

The Church of Saint Charles Borromeo and Our Lady of the Assumption (Spanish: Iglesia de San Carlos Borromeo y Nuestra Señora de la Asunción) is a Roman Catholic parish church in the neighbourhood of Prado, Montevideo, Uruguay.

The parish was established on 29 April 1934.

The temple is an interesting example of Modern Architecture using reinforced concrete with parabolic shapes; the project was designed by architect Juan Pablo Terra, the structural calculation by Eladio Dieste, the acoustics by Luis García Pardo, and the construction was performed by the company Álvaro Palenga in 1956.
