= Memoria Urbana Berlin =

Sculpture in Berlin, Germany

Coordinates: 52°30′33″N 13°23′19.6″E

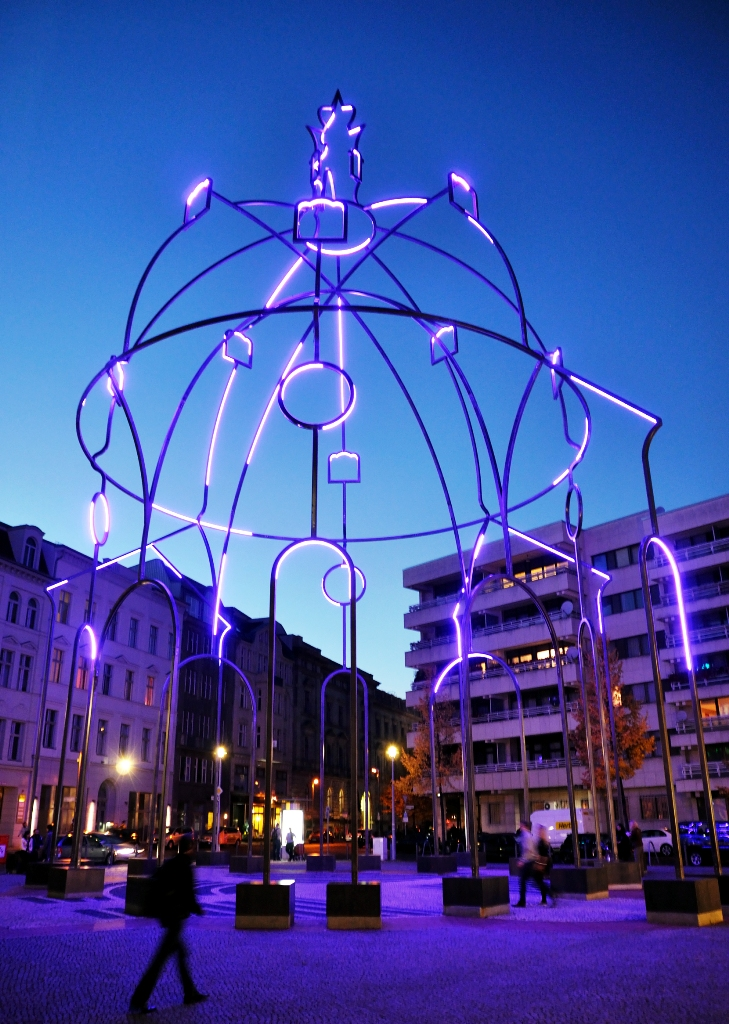
- Artist: Juan Garaizabal
- Year: 2012
- Type: Square section steel tube and LED illumination system
- Dimensions: 31 m (101 ft)
- Location: Bethlehemkirchplatz (Bethlehem Square), Berlin, Germany

Memoria Urbana Berlin (also known as Reconstruction Bohemian Bethlehem Church) is a public sculpture by Spanish artist Juan Garaizabal that stands in the middle of the Bethlehemkirchplatz, Mitte district, Berlin, Germany. It was constructed in June 2012 on the mosaic marking the exact site and size of the original Bohemian or Bethlehem Church (German: Böhmische Kirche, Bethlehemskirche), which was destroyed in the war. The sculpture is made up of 800 meters (2,600 feet) of square section (12x12 cm/4.7 in) steel tube and 300 meters (984 feet) of LED illumination system. Its structure draws in the air the lines of the silhouette of the lost construction, recreating its volume in the form of a sketch. It measures 25 x 15 x 31 metres (82 x 49 x 101 feet) in height and weighs 44 short tons (40 metric tons).

== Construction and maintenance ==
Originally planned as a temporary installation, as of December 2013 the district and municipal authorities have decreed permanent status for the work. Administrative proceedings for the permanent allocation on public grounds are currently ongoing. The Lux-Bethlehem e.V. cultural trust, representing twenty of the public and private institutions that promoted the permanent installation, has been formally created to guarantee the maintenance of the sculpture.

== Symbolism ==
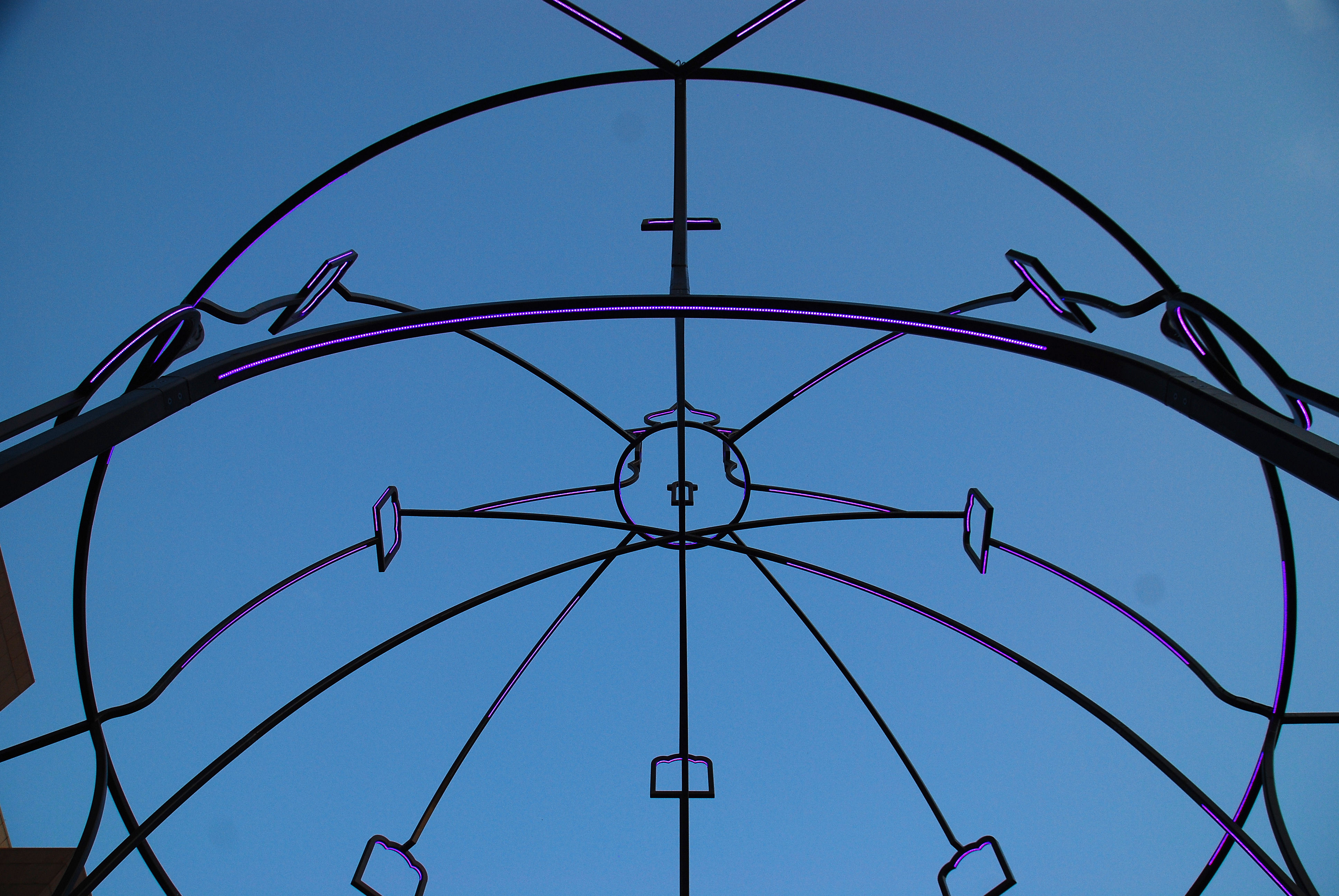
Berlin, Bethlehems-Kirche (Rekonstruktion Memoria Urbana 2012), illuminated cupola

It is a monument dedicated to freedom of conscience and to immigration with the spirit of Europeanism.

The original Bohemian Church otherwise Bethlehem Church was built between 1733 and 1735 in the middle of the Friedrichstadt (now the Mitte district) of Berlin, representing one of the most positive chapters of relations between Germany and Bohemia. Thanks to King Frederick William I of Prussia, Czech refugees leaving their homeland for religious reasons were admitted to the Friedrichstadt district of Berlin. It was a monument to the tolerance pervading the foundation of the Prussian State.

In 1943, it was badly damaged by bombing. Later, in 1963, the church was demolished and the site incorporated into the facilities of Checkpoint Charlie.
