= Luis García Pardo =

Uruguayan architect (1910–2006)

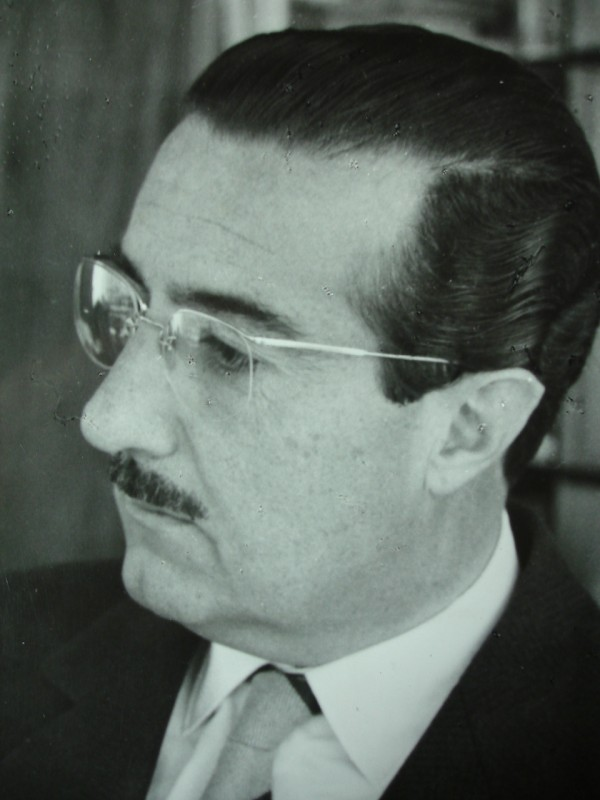
Luis García Pardo, ca. 1960.

Luis Alberto García Pardo (Montevideo, 29 August 1910 - 3 July 2006) was a Uruguayan architect, notable for his structural developments in reinforced concrete.

== Selected works ==
The production of García Pardo includes several residential and religious buildings, as well as building systems.

- Parish Church, San Jacinto (1941)
- Edificio Gilpe, Pocitos (1955)
- Edificio Guanabara, Pocitos (1955)
- San Carlos Borromeo Church (1956, with Juan Pablo Terra Gallinal and Eladio Dieste)
- Edificio El Pilar, Pocitos (1957, with Adolfo Sommer Smith)
- Edificio El Grillo, Punta del Este (1957)
- Edificio Positano, Pocitos (1959, with Adolfo Sommer Smith)
- Edificio L'Hirondelle, Punta del Este (1960, with Alfredo Nebel Farini)
