= Pedro Figari =

Uruguayan painter and politician

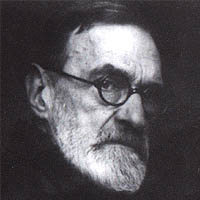
- Born: Pedro Figari Solari; June 29, 1861; Montevideo
- Died: July 24, 1938 (aged 77); Montevideo
- Known for: lawyer, writer, politician, educator and artist
- Movement: Impressionism
- Children: Juan Carlos Figari

Pedro Figari (June 29, 1861 – July 24, 1938) was a Uruguayan painter, lawyer, writer, and politician. Although he did not begin painting until his later years, he is best known as an early modernist painter who emphasized capturing the everyday aspects of life in his work. In most of his pieces, he sought to capture the essence of his home by painting local customs that he had observed in his childhood.

Figari painted primarily from memory, a technique that gives his work a far more personal feeling. With his unique style, which involved painting without the intention of creating an illusion, he, along with other prominent Latin-American artists such as Diego Rivera and Tarsila do Amaral, sparked a revolution of identity in the art world of Latin America.

== Life and training ==
Pedro Figari was born in 1861. Although he showed an interest in art during his childhood, most of his life was devoted to the practice of law. In 1886, he received a degree in law. His position as a defense counsel for the poor exposed him to many social issues that most likely influenced his art later on. During the same year in which he received his degree, Figari studied under Godofredo Sommavilla, an academically trained Italian painter, got married, and went to France. It was there that he was exposed to Post-Impressionism, which also greatly influenced his art. "On his return to Uruguay he became actively involved in journalism, law and politics as well as fostering the creation of the Escuela de Bellas Artes. […] He was a member of the Uruguayan Parliament, president of the Ateneo of Montevideo and director of the Escuela Nacional de Artes y Oficios."

Although people often claim that Figari did not actually begin to paint until his later life, he had always painted to some extent. His early paintings were "tight watercolor and oil sketches [that had both] academic charm [and] the expert domestic intimacy of Manet and Degas".

It was not until 1921, at the age of 60, that Figari devoted himself completely to painting. He moved to Buenos Aires and left behind the Italian style that he had adopted earlier in his career. Here, he "created figurative compositions as arrangements of colour, reconstructing rather than documenting the Uruguayan scene; the geography, gaucho life, the celebrations, symbolic rituals and carnivals of the local black community." When he returned to Paris in 1925, he continued to paint this subject matter from memory, which brought him recognition as a painter. His work was also part of the art competition at the 1932 Summer Olympics.

== Style ==
Pedro Figari clearly has a style of his own. Although he was heavily influenced by Italian art earlier in his career, he managed to reconnect with a more naïve style when he began to paint seriously.

Figari painted during a period in which the members of the art community in South America were in the process of struggling to find their own personal style. Mainly, they wanted to separate their style from that of the Europeans. More often than not, paintings of the past depicted highly impersonal scenes; they were mainly historical events or figures. European paintings emphasized "quality of technique, attention to purely plastic values, [and] fantasy." Figari is noted as one of the first painters to veer away from this typical European style and instead create something original and new. He "considered that European civilization had entailed the loss of a harmonious and simple life, while America offered the possibility of returning to the origins." His preference for a return to origins mirrors the actual visual style of his paintings. Rather than painting objects accurately and informatively, Figari painted with the intent to capture the essence and feeling of a given moment. He says himself: "My painting is not simply a way of painting. Rather, it is a way of seeing, thinking, and feeling. I am surprised I have been able to paint sensations, and not things, even before mastering completely pictoral techniques." He rejects the idea to paint mechanistically determined matters, instead emphasizing energy and life. It is what is considered a naïve style: one that "allowed him to caricature the social conventions of the bourgeoisie in his native Uruguay with a sort of wide-eyed innocence."

== Relationship to artistic movements ==
During his travels in Europe, Pedro Figari was exposed to a large amount of Post-Impressionist art. His own paintings showed early modernist traits, as they had an emphasis on flatness and the surface of the canvas. Modernist painting rejected the idea of creating an illusion on the canvas. Rather than focusing on the form and technique of the work, modernist painters brought attention to the content. Much like this, Figari's paintings highlighted the materials that were used. He did not paint with the intention to portray a subject realistically; he painted to capture the ideas and feeling behind a piece, and did this by using certain brush-strokes that were determined by what was appropriate for the part of the piece he was painting. Although something in his piece might academically be considered poorly drawn, it is more often than not far more expressive than the most accurate paintings of the Old Masters.

== Legacy ==
The legacy of Pedro Figari is one of freedom and expression. By distancing himself from a common European style that permitted only academic traditions, he helped viewers learn to celebrate the culture of their country. He has said that he intended to "elevate Uruguayan culture and make people love the American things that are so very much their own." By creating his own style that embodied Uruguay, he bestowed upon the people of the country a sense of pride and love. They no longer felt obligated to adopt the customs of European countries. Instead, they immersed themselves in the history and roots of their own.

In 1995, the Figari Award was established. Named for Pedro Figari, it is given annually to recognize Uruguayan visual artists. Since 2010 it has been administered by the Museo Figari, a museum in Montevideo also named in his honor.

== Gallery of paintings ==
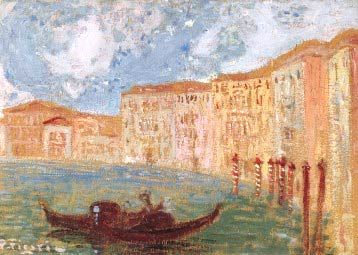
Venecia (óleo s/cartón) - Venice (oil on cardboard) - 35x50cm

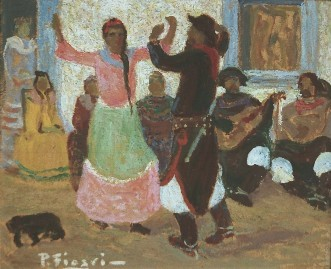
Bailecito (óleo s/cartón) - Just a Dance (oil on cardboard) - 33x40cm

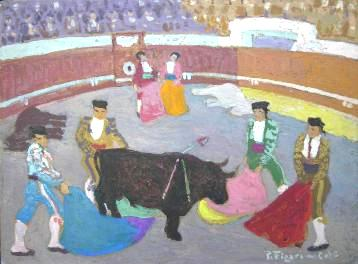
La Muerte (óleo s/cartón) - Death (oil on cardboard) - 60x80cm

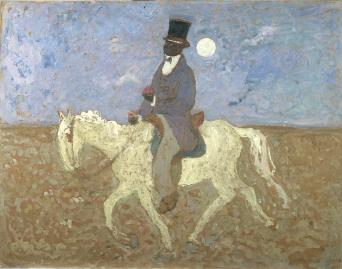
Flores silvestres (óleo s/cartón) - Wild flowers (oil on cardboard) - 53.5x68.5 cm

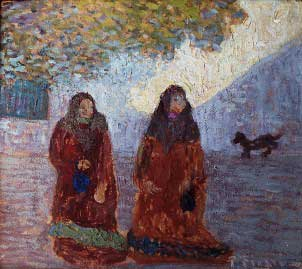
Mirá, Genoveva (óleo s/cartón) - Look, Genoveva (oil on cardboard) - 30x33.5 cm

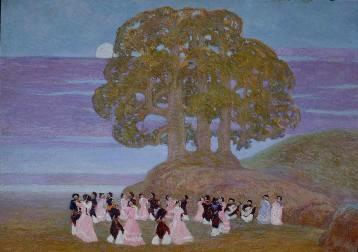
Pericón (óleo s/cartón) - (a creole dance) (oil on cardboard) - 70x100

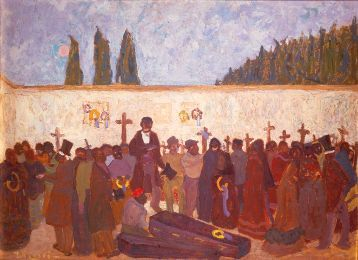
El homenaje (óleo s/cartón) - The homage (oil on cardboard) - 60x80cm

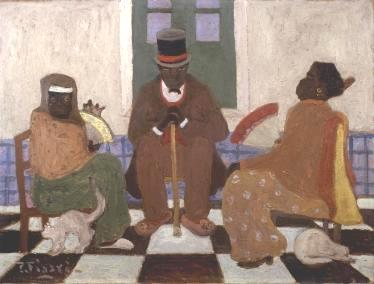
Visita pesada (óleo s/cartón) - Cumbersome Visit (oil on cardboard) - 48x63cm

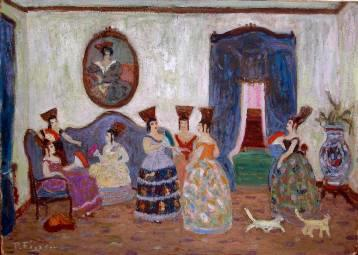
Las siete hermanas (óleo s/cartón) - The Seven Sisters (oil on cardboard)50x70cm

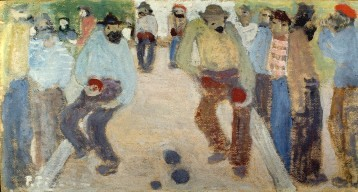
Mientras la bocha rueda (óleos/cartón) While the Bowl Rolls (oil on cardboard) - 26x50cm

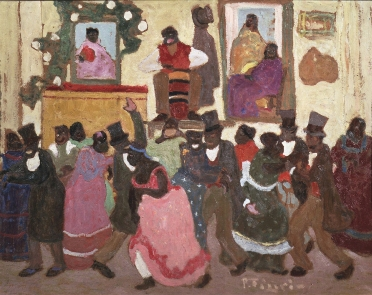
Candombe (óleo s/cartón) (oil on cardboard) 53x68cm

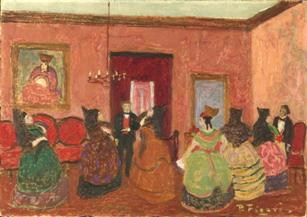
Un pedido a Rosas (óleo s/cartón) - A Request to Rosas (oil on cardboard) - 49x69cm

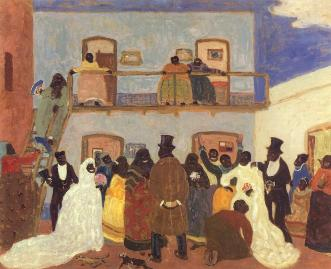
Doble boda (óleo s/cartón) - Double Wedding (oil on cardboard) - 79x98cm

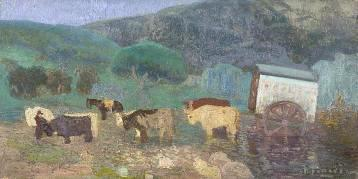
La carreta (óleo s/cartón) - The Oxcart (oil on cardboard) - 40x70cm

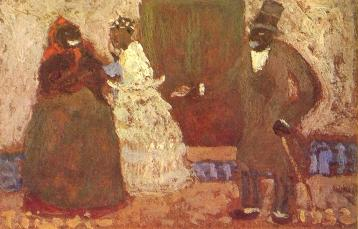
Galantería (óleo s/cartón) - Gallantry (oil on cardboard) - 16.5x25.5 cm

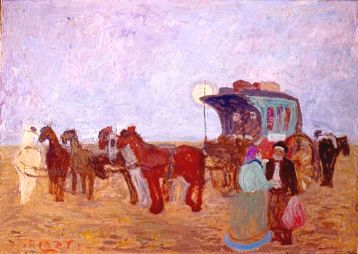
Recogiendo un pasajero (óleo s/cartón) Picking up a passenger - (oil on cardboard)

== List of exhibitions ==
- Drawings in Latin America, 1998, Museum of Modern Art (New York)
- Taller Pedro Figari, 1956, Salto
- Paintings by Pedro Figari, 1947, Museum of Fine Arts (Houston)
- Paintings by Pedro Figari, 1947, Nelson-Atkins Museum (Kansas City, Missouri)
- Paintings and Prints by Artists of Various Nations, 1942, Museum of Fine Arts (Houston)
- Latin American Artists of the 20th Century, 1993, Museum of Modern Art (New York)

== List of artworks ==
- Candombe Bajo La Luna, 1922 (Alfredo Gonzalez Garano Collection)
- Pericon En La Estancia, 1924 (Museo Nacional de Bellas Artes)
- En Familia, 1924 (Andres Garmendia Uranga Collection)
- Pericon, 1925 (Roque Freire Collection)
- Del Entierro, 1928 (Alejandro Shaw Collection)
- Candombe, 1924 (Roque Freire Collection)
- Patio Colonial, 1924 (Raul C. Monsegur Collection)
- El Cielito Bajo El Monte, 1923 (Celina Gonzalez Garano Collection)
- Entierro, 1921 (Museo Nacional de Bellas Artes)
- La Pampa, 1927 (Museo Nacional de Bellas Artes)

== Sources and further reading ==
- Baddeley, Oriana, and Valerie Fraser. Drawing the Line: Art and Cultural Identity in Contemporary Latin America. New York: Verso, 1989.
- Basaldua, Emilio. "Hector Basaldua and the Colon Theater: Thirty Years of Stage Design." The Journal of Decorative and Propaganda Arts 18 (1992): 32–53.
- Berndtson, Arthur. "Review: La filosofia en el Uruguay en el siglo XX." The Americas 13.4 (1957): 424–427.
- Castillo, Jorge. "The Development of a Style." XXIII Bienal Internacional de Sao Paolo. Dec 8, 1996 <https://web.archive.org/web/20080203073450/http://www1.uol.com.br/bienal/23bienal/especial/iefi.htm#Nome>.
- Haber, Alicia. "Vernacular Culture in Uruguayan Art: An Análisis of the Documentary Function of the Works of: Pedro Figari, Carlos Gonzalez and Luis Solari." Occasional Papers Series 2 (1982).
- Kalenberg, Angel. "Figari, Pedro". Encyclopedia of Latin American & Caribbean Art. Ed. Jane Turner. 1 vol. New York: New York, 2000.
- Mac Lean, Carlos A. Herrera. Pedro Figari. Buenos Aires: Editorial Poseidon, 1943.
- Manley, Marianne. "Painting and Traditions." Art Museum of the Americas. <https://web.archive.org/web/20070609021100/http://www.museum.oas.org/permanent/americanism/figari/writings_about.html#traditions>.
- Sanjurjo, Annick. "Pedro Figari (1861–1938)". Contemporary Latin American Artists: Exhibitions at the Organization of American States 1941–1964. Ed. Annick Sanjurjo. 1 vol. Maryland: Lanham, 1997.
- Szyszlo, Fernando de. "Contemporary Latin American Painting. A Brief Survey." College Art Journal 19 (1959–1960): 134–135.
