= Juan Garaizabal =

Spanish sculptor

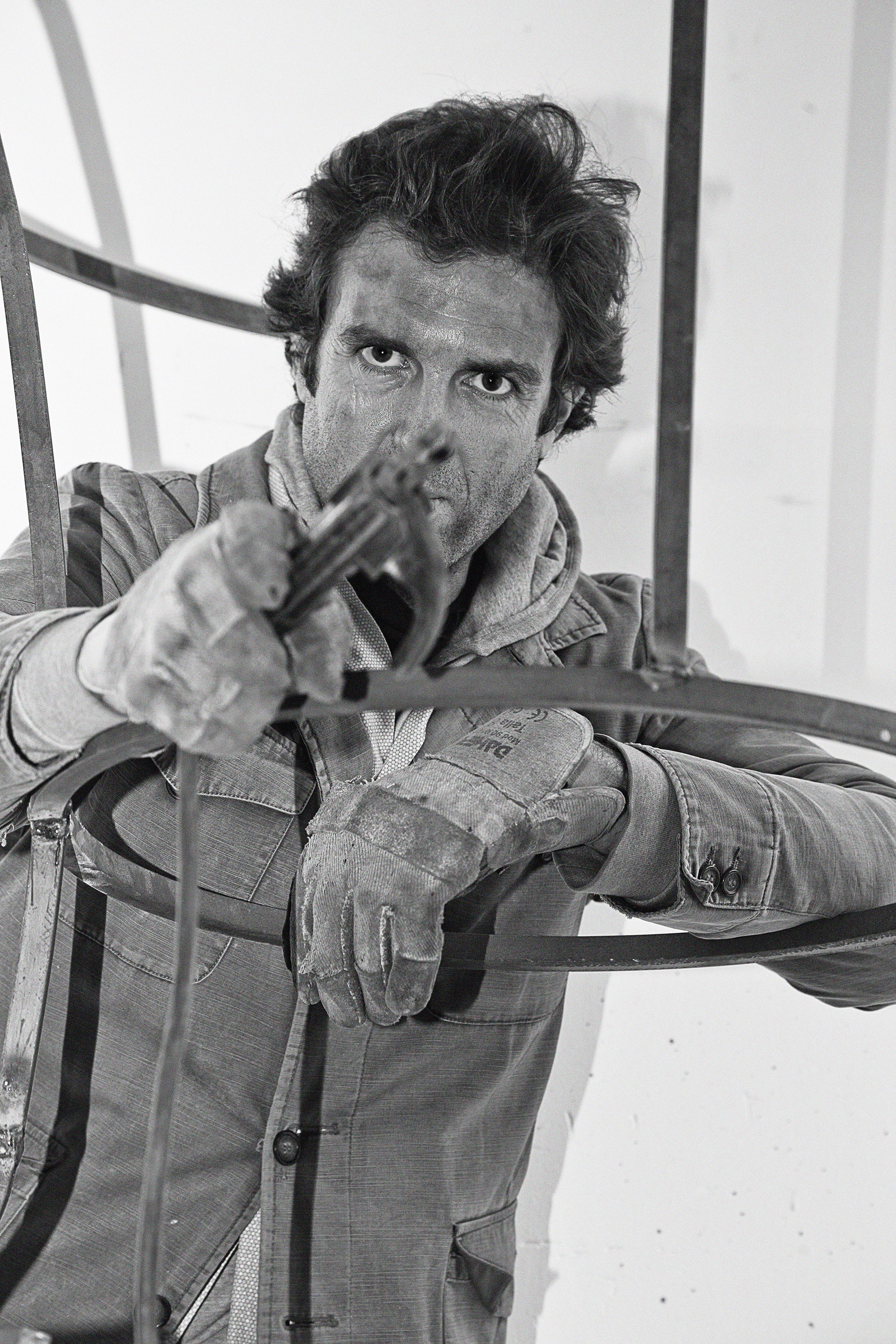
- Juan Garaizabal, 2018
- Born: Juan Garaizabal Marsans; 20 March 1971 (age 54); Madrid, Spain
- Known for: Sculptor

Juan Garaizabal (born 1971 in Madrid) is a Spanish plastic artist, Garaizabal's work encompasses drawings, sculpture, light and acoustic installations, video art, and engraving. According to the journal El País Garaizabal is one of the most internationally renowned Spanish artists. The most visible part of his works are his monumental public sculptures. His "Urban Memories" structures, intertwining sculpture and illumination, are a recuperation of long-lost architectural elements occupying vacant, historical sites.

== Artistic history ==
Initially a conceptual artist, a large part of his work has been done by hand, using such techniques as forging, carpentry, electricity, plasticity, and masonry – all skills acquired through time and experimentation. As of 2008, his main studio is in Berlin, Germany, although he maintains another in Madrid, Spain and a third one in Miami, United States.

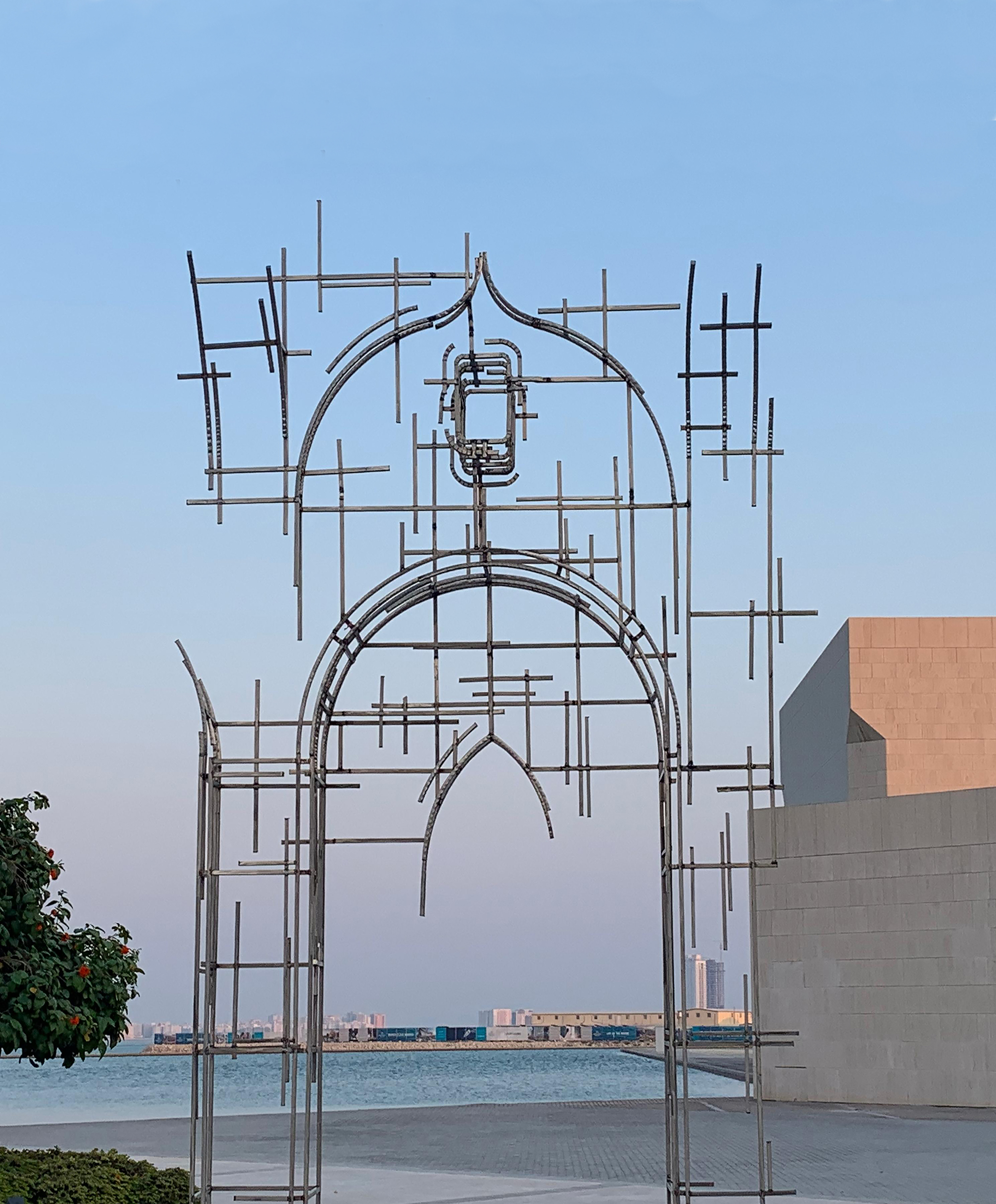
Door of Dilmun sculpture. Bahrain National Museum. 2024. Garaizabal. RAK Art Foundation

== Public installations ==
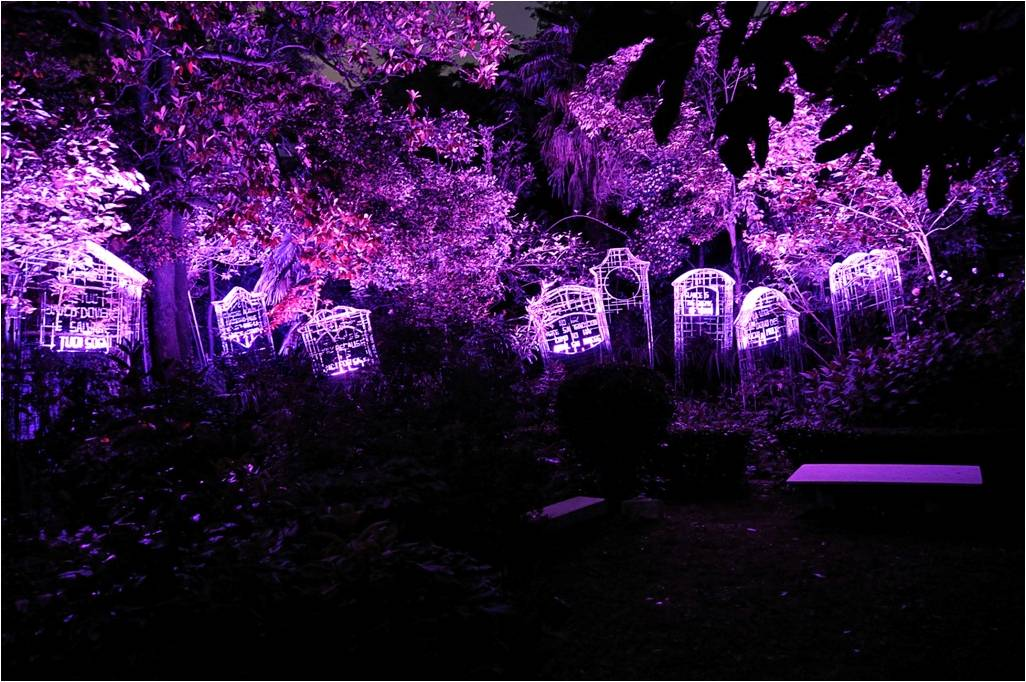
Juan Garaizabal Memoria del Giardino

- 2006: Bosque de Flores, Valencia, Spain.
- 2007: Memoria Urbana Bucharest, Uranus Area. Noaptea Alba, Romania.
- 2011: Archives Stairway. Private collection. Connecticut, United States.
- 2012: Memoria Urbana Berlin, Germany.
- 2013: Memoria del Giardino Venice, Italy. Curated by Barbara Rose.
- 2016: Memoria Urbana Miami; Havana's Balcony, United States of America.

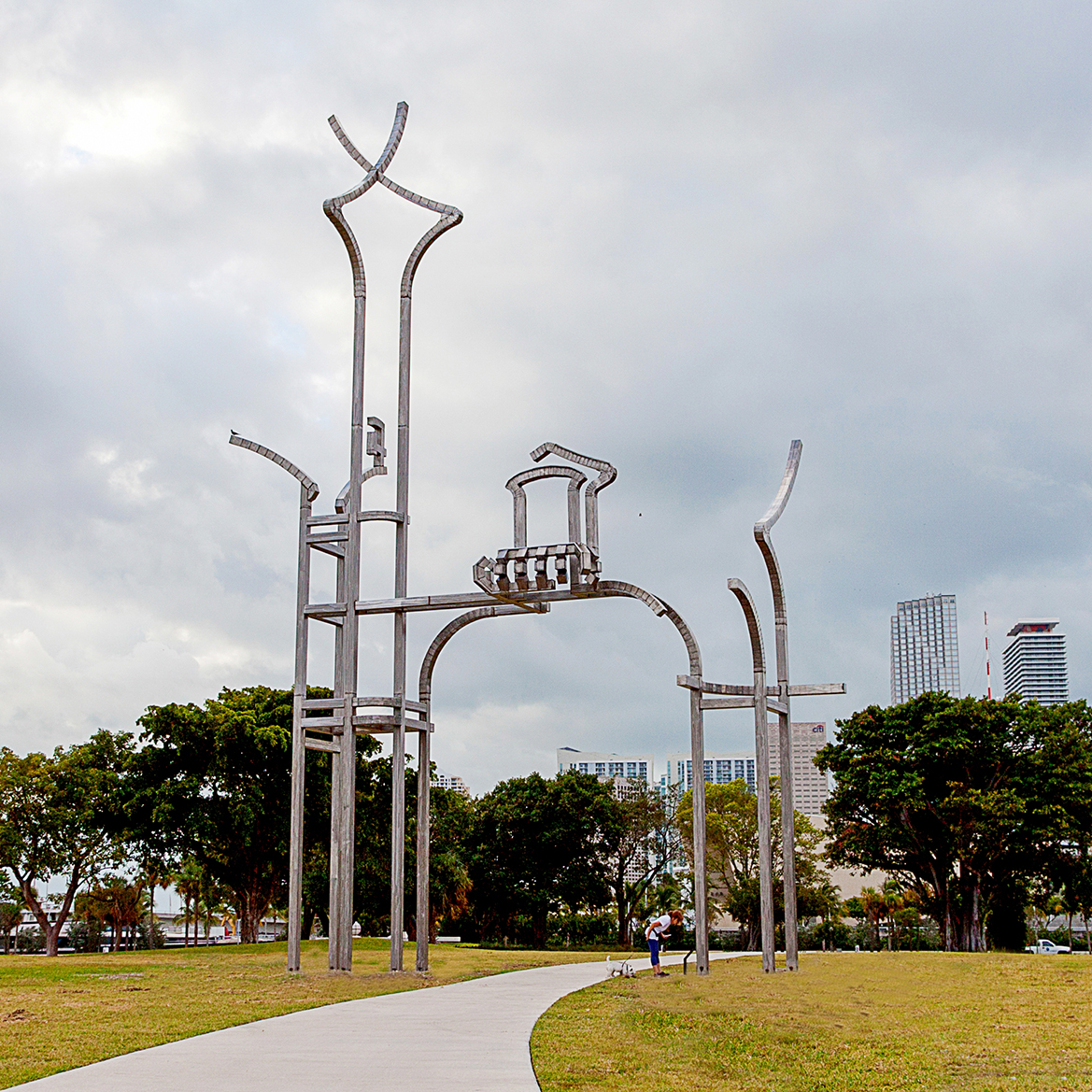
Havana's Balcony in Museum Park Miami

- 2018: Memoria Urbana Segovia Hay Festival
- 2020: Piedra Sobre Piedra, Toledo, Spain.
- 2020: Ever Time Gate, Shanghai, China.
- 2021: Four Monumental Sculptures, Paris, France.
- 2021: Fondation Prince Albert, Monaco.
- 2021: Biennale de Sculpture, Saint-Paul-de-Vence, France.
- 2023: Ever Time Balcony, Shanghai, China.
- 2024: La Memoria del Vidrio, Valencia, Spain.
- 2024: Land of Dilmun and Door of Dilmun, Manama, Bahrain.
- 2025: Memoria Urbana: Les Bains Napoléon, Biarritz, Frankreich

== Personal life ==
Between 1998 and 2007, he traveled across the African continent in several stages, using a Mercedes-Benz Unimog as his means of transport. These journeys took place once or twice a year, accompanied by his family and friends, covering the route from Madrid to Cape Town.

He resides and works primarily between Berlin, Madrid and Shanghai he combines with temporary stays and studios dedicated to other projects around the world. He has been divorced twice and has two daughters, Olivia (2003) and Casilda (2004), from his first marriage.
