= Iglesia de Nuestra Señora de Lourdes =

Roman Catholic parish church in Malvín, Montevideo, Uruguay

Coordinates: 34.8956°S 56.0997°W

Iglesia de Nuestra Señora de Lourdes (Malvín)

Religion
- Affiliation: Roman Catholic
- Ecclesiastical or organizational status: Parish church

Location
- Location: Michigan 1645; Montevideo, Uruguay
- Interactive map of Iglesia de Nuestra Señora de Lourdes (Malvín)

Architecture
- Type: Church

The Church of Our Lady of Lourdes (Spanish: Iglesia de Nuestra Señora de Lourdes) is a Roman Catholic parish church located in the neighbourhood of Malvín, Montevideo, Uruguay.

The parish was established on 4 February 1934 by Archbishop Juan Francisco Aragone. The temple is dedicated to Our Lady of Lourdes.

There was a project in the 1960s to build a bigger, modern church in this place. Eladio Dieste designed the reinforced ceramic building, but only the apse was built. The project was built instead in Spain: the parish church of San Juan de Ávila, Alcalá de Henares.
