= Structural art =

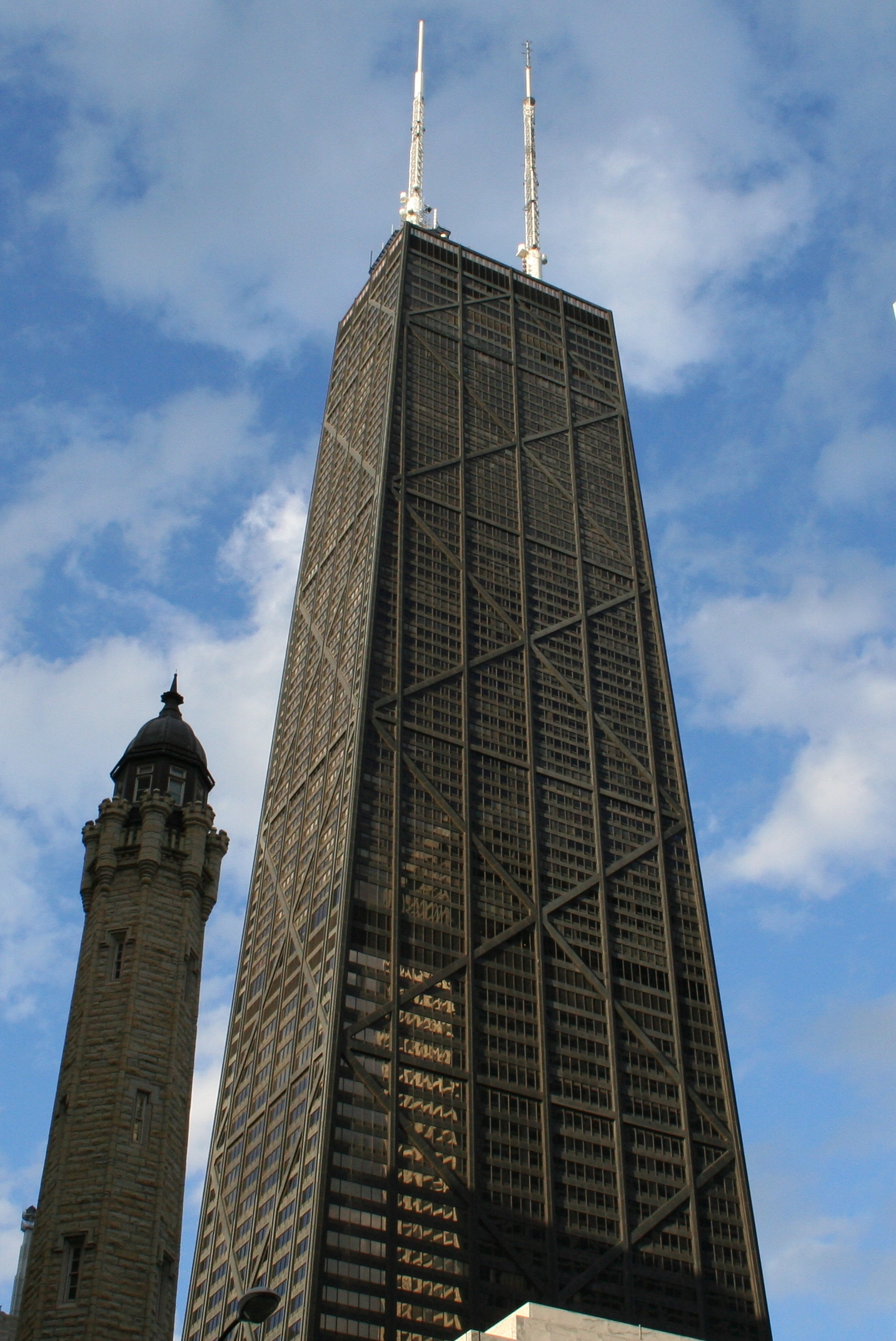
John Hancock Center, in Chicago, a work of structural art designed by Fazlur Khan in partnership with architect Bruce Graham

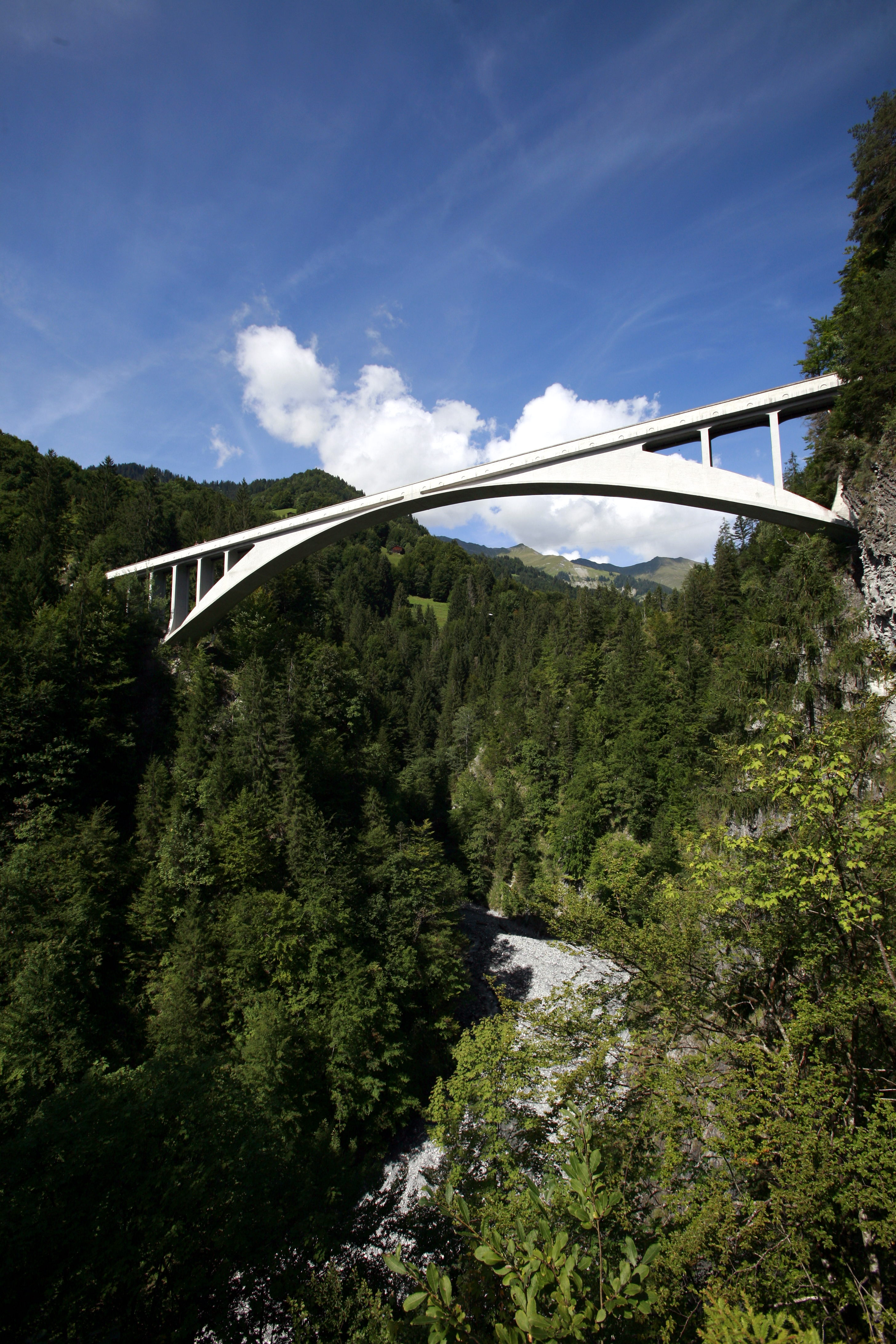
Salginatobel Bridge, in Switzerland, a work of structural art designed by Robert Maillart

Certain works of structural engineering design are also works of structural art. Such works can be classified as structural art when they attain excellence in the three areas of efficiency, economy, and elegance, as defined by Prof. David P. Billington of Princeton University. A key part of the concept of structural art is that the structural engineer making the design must exercise his or her creativity and playfulness to create an elegant structure within the constraints imposed by engineering requirements. These constraints include the safety and serviceability of the structure. Therefore, a structure cannot be a successful work of structural art without also being a successful work of structural engineering design, yet many works of structural engineering design that are safe and serviceable do not rise to the level of structural art because they fail to be economical, efficient, or elegant. Structural art is a topic of active scholarly research at several universities in the United States, including Princeton University, Tufts University, Bucknell University, University of Massachusetts Amherst, the Massachusetts Institute of Technology, and Roger Williams University, and in other parts of the world such as Spain (Universitat Politécnica de València) and Germany (HCU Hamburg). While structural artists often collaborate with architects, the discipline of structural art is based upon engineering rather than architectural design. A recent summary about this topic can be found in a review paper.

== Origin of the concept ==
The idea of structural art as a creative subdiscipline of structural engineering originates from the scholarship of Prof. David P. Billington of Princeton University. The term appears to have been coined in his 1983 book The Tower and the Bridge, and arose out of scholarly study of great works of structural design made by engineers starting in the late 18th century with the beginning of the wide availability of iron as a structural material. Much of the impetus for the idea came from the personal and professional writings of engineers such as Thomas Telford, John Roebling, and Robert Maillart, among others, who wrote of the conscious way they attempted to create aesthetically pleasing, imaginative, and elegant structures, while meeting safety and serviceability requirements. A theme uniting many of the foundational structural artists is that they either were builders themselves (John Roebling) or had a builder's mentality (Fazlur Khan). Other scholars of structural engineering design have published works that can be considered part of the body of knowledge on structural art. Notable among these is Alan Holgate

== The three S's and E's ==
It is also said that a work of structural art should be interpreted in terms of the 'Three S's'; the scientific, social, and symbolic meaning:

- Scientific: How is the structure designed to safely transmit loads to the ground? What materials are used, and how much is used?
- Social: What were the short and long term costs of the structure to society? What role does the structure play in the functioning of society?
- Symbolic: What feelings does the structure inspire? What meaning does the structure carry for its users?

An example of three specific ideas related to the three S's are the 'Three E's'. A work of structural art must excel in efficiency, economy, and elegance, often referred to as the 'Three E's':

- Efficiency: The use of the minimum amount of material needed to ensure that the structure safely performs its function.
- Economy: Avoidance of excessive monetary cost in the design, construction, operating and decommissioning costs of a structure. Economy should be evaluated in terms of the life-cycle cost of the structure whenever possible.
- Elegance: The structural form should be aesthetically pleasing, but should be defined and driven by engineering considerations. Thus, an elegant design is not simply one that is pleasing, but one that arises from engineering creativity, satisfies the requirements of efficiency and economy, and is also pleasing.

Professor Billington has also put forth in his lectures that works of structural art involve imagination, inspiration, and innovation - though this categorization is not found in his formal writings.

== Structural artists and great works ==
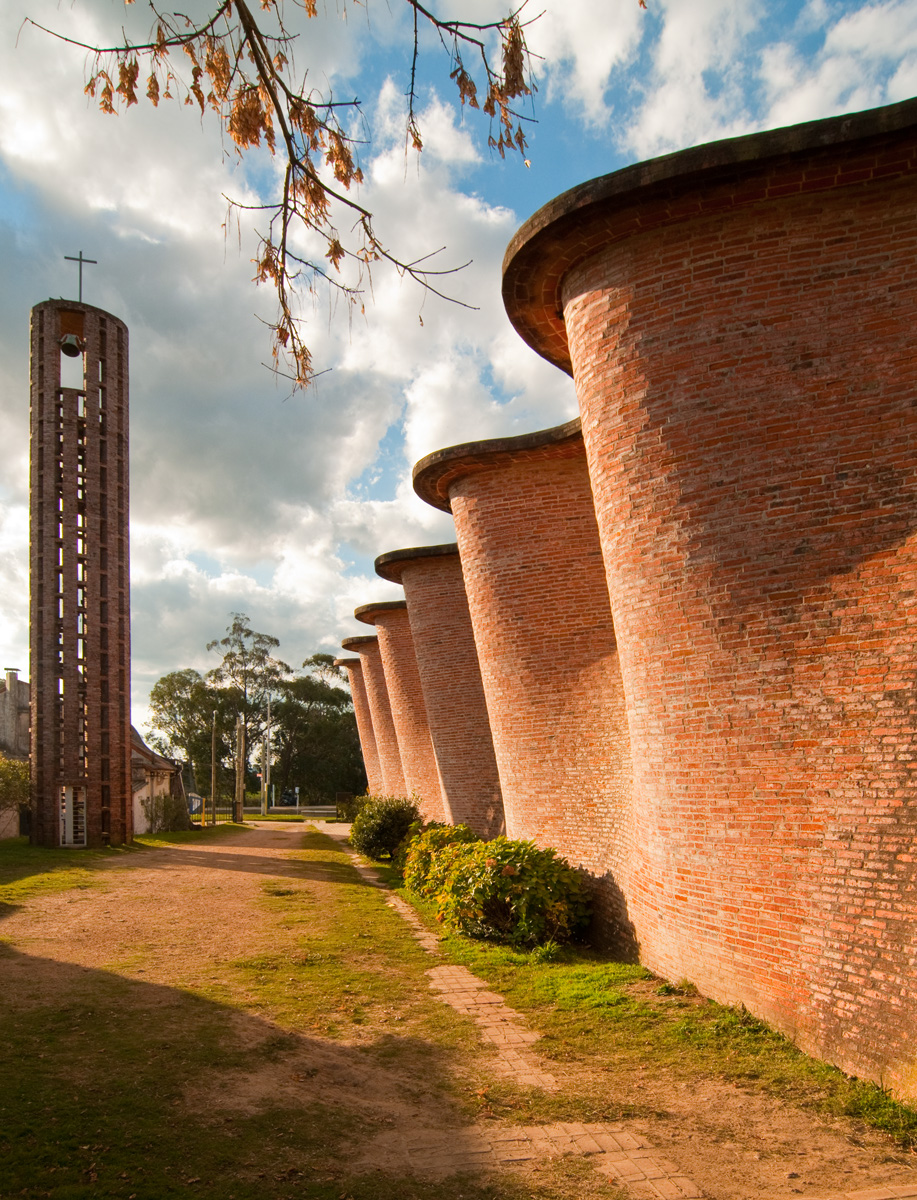
Eladio Dieste's Church of Christ the Worker, built in his innovative technique of reinforced brick masonry. Since 2021 a UNESCO World Heritage Site.

Some of the structural artists who essentially defined the art form by their own works include: Thomas Telford, Gustav Eiffel, John Roebling, Othmar Ammann, Robert Maillart, Christian Menn, Heinz Isler, Fazlur Khan, Felix Candela, Pier Luigi Nervi, Eduardo Torroja, Eladio Dieste. Some of the great works of structural art include: Menai Straits Bridge, Craigellachie Bridge, Eiffel Tower, Brooklyn Bridge, George Washington Bridge, Verrazzano–Narrows Bridge, Salginatobel Bridge, Ganter Bridge, Sicli Company Building, John Hancock Center, Los Manantiales Restaurant at Xochimilco, Little Sports Palace.

== Contrast with architecture ==
Structural art is distinct from architecture primarily in that the constraints under which structural artists practice are very different from those under which architects practice. Structural artists, while seeking elegance, must satisfy safety and serviceability, efficiency and economy, and usage needs. Architects are somewhat freer in making designs, constrained primarily by usage needs.

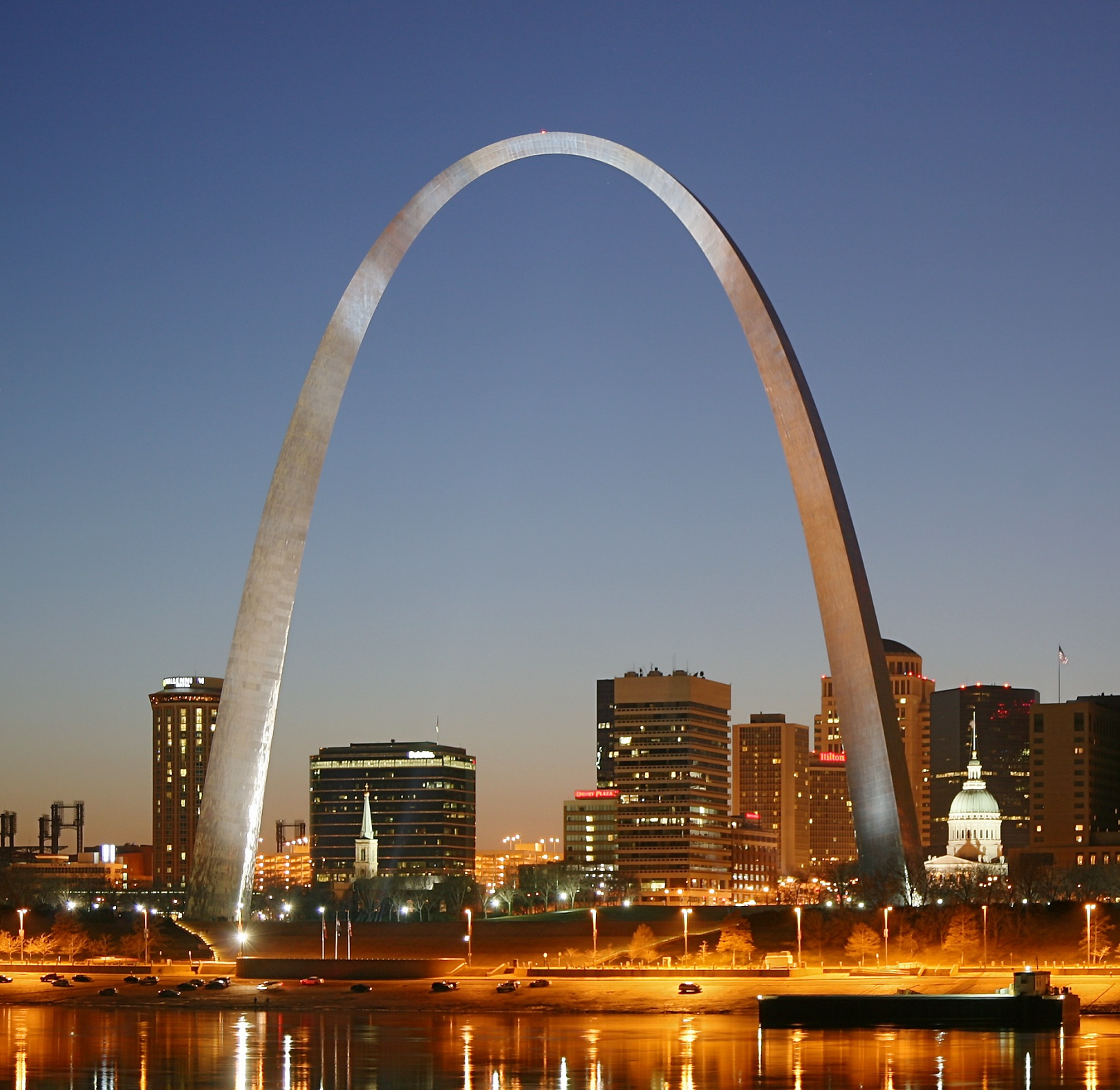
Gateway Arch, a successful work of architecture

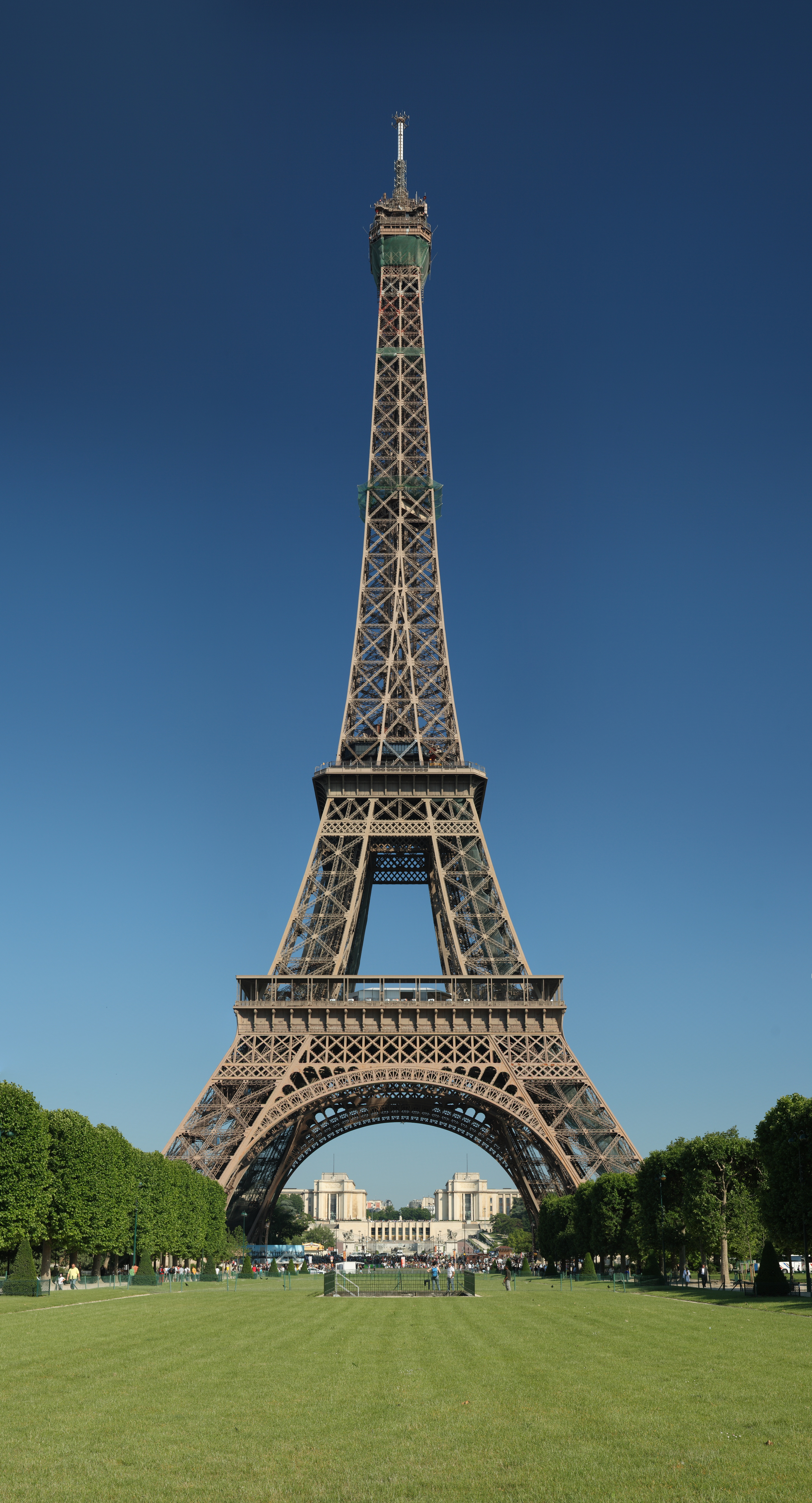
Eiffel Tower, a successful work of structural art

Eero Saarinen's Gateway Arch and the Eiffel Tower provide a contrast that illustrates the difference between structural art and architecture. The Gateway arch is widely thought to be a highly successful work of architecture, and the Eiffel Tower is recognized as a work of structural art. Both structures must primarily resist wind loads yet have very different forms. The Eiffel Tower has been shown to be the near optimal form for resisting wind loads, and therefore is more in line with the ideals of structural art than architecture. The Gateway Arch succeeds as a work of architecture and does not meet the ideals of efficiency and economy.

== Criticism and differing views on structural art ==
Contemporary scholarly debate regarding the definition of structural art continues to develop and advance the concept. Two areas in which such debate is occurring are the inclusion of a temporal aspect in the evaluation of structural art, and inclusion of the sustainability of a design. Regarding the temporal aspect, it has been argued that the time-dependent concept of a design process is missing from the conventional definition of structural art. This feature of a design can arise particularly regarding construction, when economy of time is an important consideration. Though sustainability of a design is not explicitly included in the current definition of structural art, it can be argued that a design that succeeds in efficiency, economy, and elegance will be sustainable, provided that evaluations of the 'Three E's' consider life-cycle performance of the structure.

Probably the most elaborated critique on structural art was given in where according to Mentor Llunji, the author of the book, widely accepted definition of structural art is considered counterproductive because imposes trivial limitations on developing the real structural engineering artistry. Llunji considers that structural 'rightness', 'honesty', or structural 'dishonesty' are more appropriate terms and tools to measure art, creativity and talent in structural engineering, rather than efficiency, economy or elegance, adding that framing structural artistic potential with three E's is thinking with a scientific mindset about art and structure. Mentor Llunji in his book advocates structural architecture over structural art as a necessity to adapt to new trends in the building industry. Structural architecture as a substitute for structural art does not limit structural creativity and does not constrain it with rules, but instead gives it more freedom to express structural artistry, mastery and ingenuity Llunji considers that we should not be 'prisoners' of this structural art created exclusively by reflecting the flow of forces on its envelope or shape, nor should we sacrifice 'structural art' for the sake of economy and efficiency. He considers that only structural nonsense is not acceptable.
