= Reinforced brick masonry =

Reinforced masonry construction technique

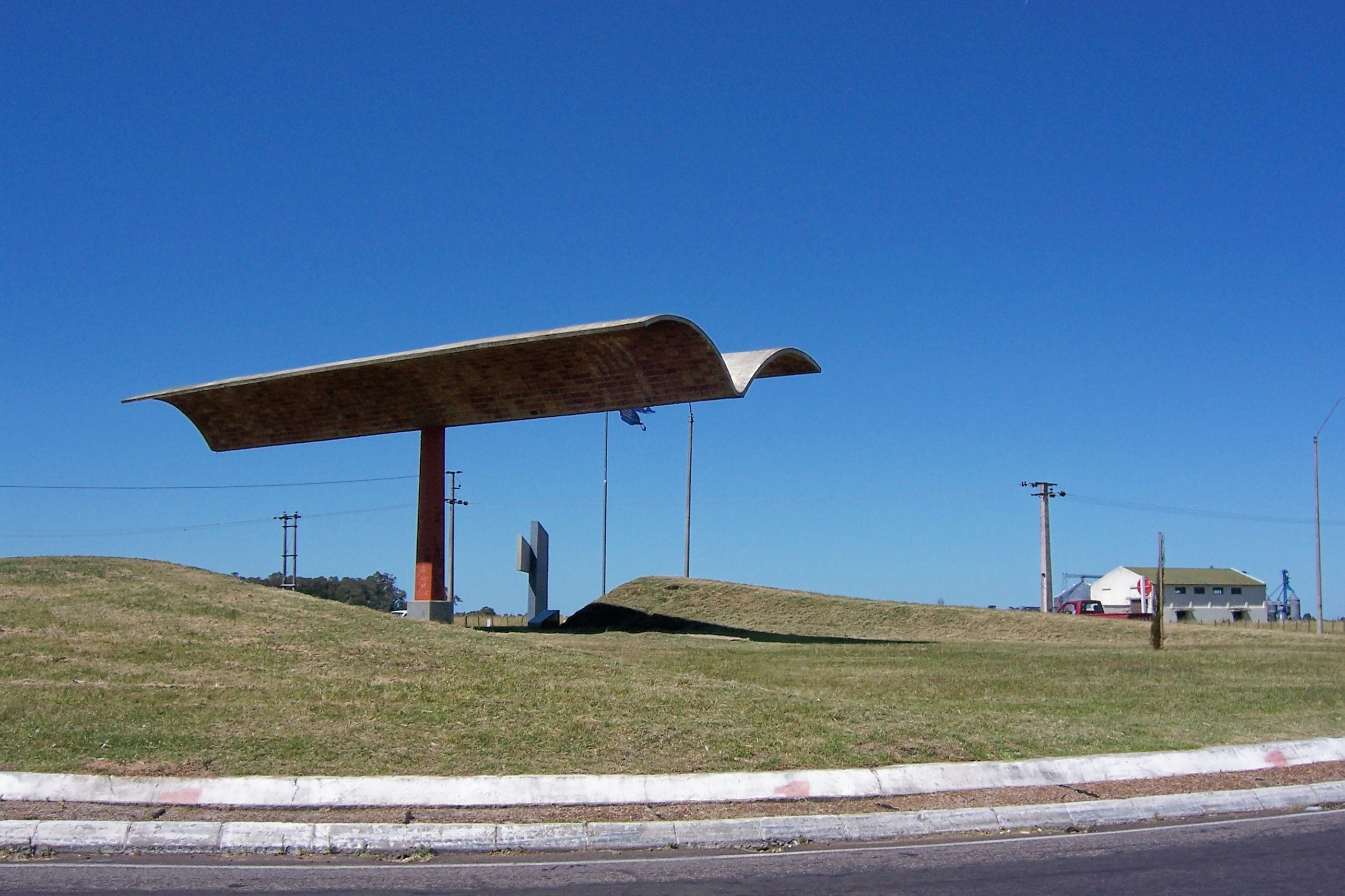
Door of Wisdom, locally nicknamed "The Gull", a sculptural tribute to Dieste at Salto, Uruguay, using his techniques.

Reinforced brick masonry (in spanish: cerámica armada), also called structural brick masonry, is a reinforced masonry construction technique invented by Uruguayan civil engineer Eladio Dieste to efficiently and economically build thin-shell barrel vaults and wide curved roof spans that are resistant to buckling.

Reinforced brick vaults, also called "gaussian vaults" as coined by Dieste himself, typically referring to the bell-shaped curve often used in statistics and probability theory, consist of a series of interlocking, curved, single-layer brick arches that can span long distances without the need for supporting columns. This allows the construction of lightweight, efficient and visually striking structures. These arches are characterized by the use of a double curvature form, along an inverted catenary, which allows for greater structural efficiency and a reduction in the amount of materials required for building wide-span roof structures.

== History ==
David P. Billington coined the term "structural art" for works of structural engineering that achieve excellence in the three areas of efficiency, economy, and elegance. Engineers Gustav Eiffel and Robert Maillart worked with new materials and techniques to design elegant, economic and structurally efficient. Many of them concentrated their designs on one building material like for example wrought-iron and prestressed concrete. Eugene Freyssinet, Felix Candela, Eduardo Torroja pionneered the construction of large thin-shell structures made out of reinforced concrete.

The concept of metal reinforced masonry was not first invented by Dieste. In 1889 French engineer Paul Cottancin patented a system of reinforced concrete, which he called "ciment armé". The Cottancin system used wire-reinforced hollow bricks acting as a permanent formwork for a cement armature and thin cement shells, as shown in the 1904 Church of Saint-Jean de Montmartre. Vertical wires ran through the brick voids, while horizontal reinforcement is placed in the joints. The brick voids and joints were filled with cement mortar to prevent metal coming into contact with air. Cottancin's labor-intensive system was quickly replaced by Hennebique's reinforced concrete, which requires the erection of wooden formwork but less skilled operators. In 1910, Rafael Guastavino was granted a patent for reinforced brick shells and Spanish engineer Torroja also developed in the 1920s their own system of reinforced ceramics. By the 1950's, the construction of thin concrete shells became more and more expensive due to the increased costs of formwork and labor and was progressively replaced by steel construction for long spans vaults.

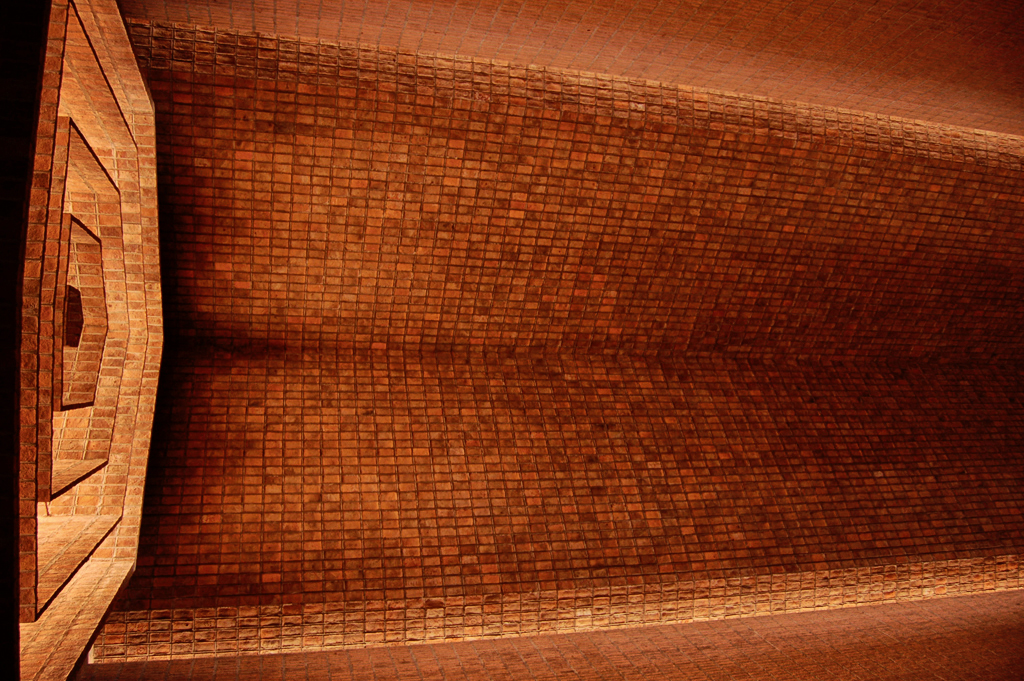
Example of reinforced ceramics in Dieste's Church of Saint Peter in Durazno, Uruguay.

Unaware of the developments in the rest of the world, Dieste developed its own system of reinforced masonry, which was little known and used in his day in South America, into a prime example of structural art. He innovated in the use of bricks which was affordable and widely available in South America. He developed many new cost-efficient techniques and elegant forms for the design of thin brick vaults. His construction techniques were derived from structural principles associated with the geometry of the inverted catenary. He gave to the cross-section of his masonry vaults a double curvature to generate stiffness and strength to resist buckling failure. He designed characteristic undulating roofs with a typical span to rise ratio of 10.

In 1946, Dieste realized his first reinforced brick vault, working with architect Antoní Bonet i Castellana on the Berlingieri house in Punta Ballena, Uruguay. After his invention, Dieste did not use his new construction technique again until 1955.

In 1956, Dieste founded with Eugenio Montañez (1916–2001) the construction and design firm Dieste y Montañez S.A., which is still in operation today. With his company, he constructed more than 1.5 million square meters of buildings such as warehouses, factories, gymnasiums and workshops.

The discovery of this construction system, as well as its development, introduction and implementation, earned the engineer Dieste worldwide recognition from the international community and eventually from UNESCO

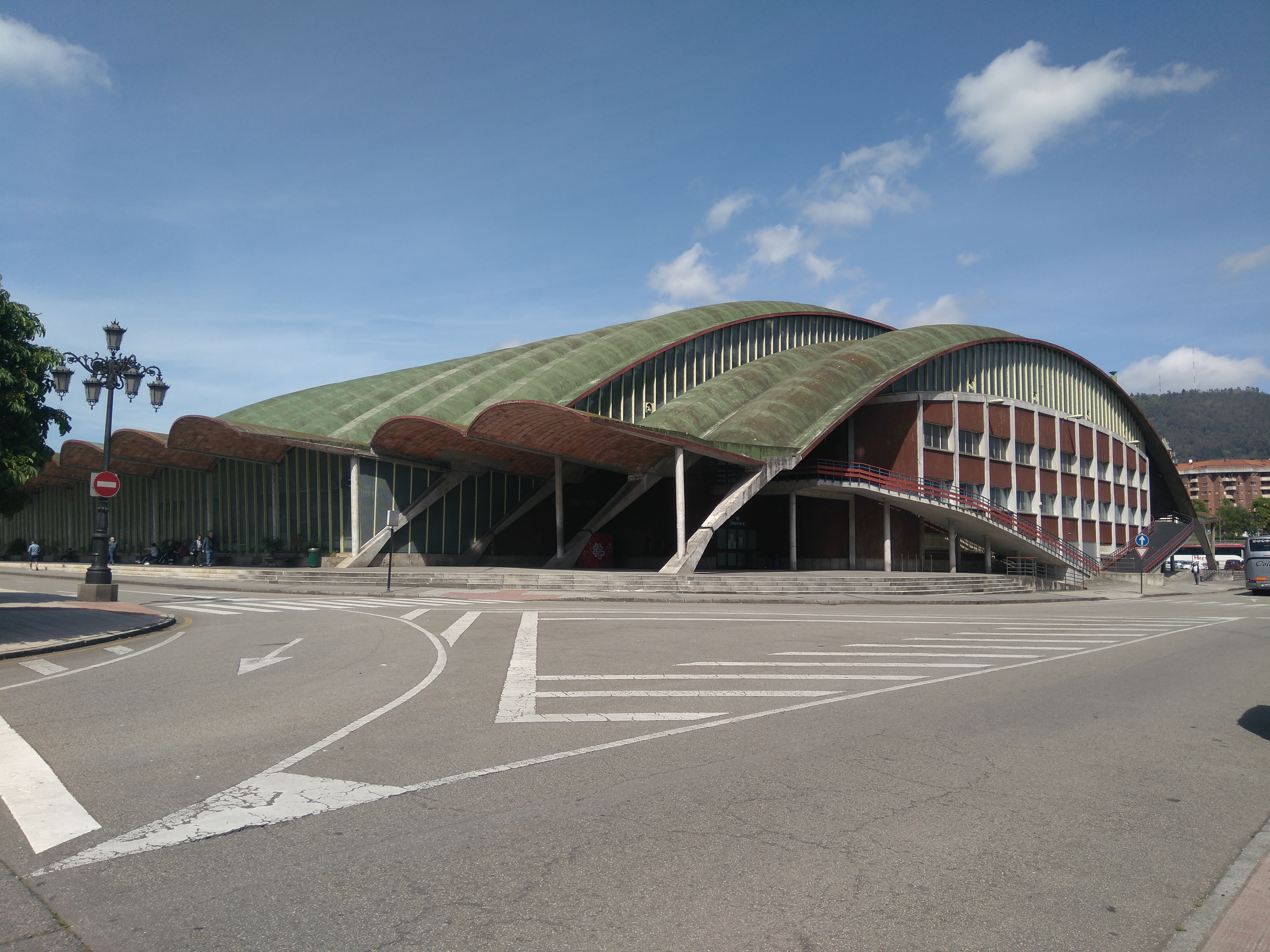
Sports hall located in Oviedo (Spain) designed by Sánchez de Río in 1966 built using reinforced ceramics.

Colombian engineer Guillermo González Zuleta and the Spanish engineer Ildefonso Sánchez del Río Pisón also developed different approaches to structural architecture to build large span buildings using ondulating reinforced ceramics.

== Description ==
The construction technique of this type of reinforced brick masonry consists of placing steel reinforcement bars at the junction of the brick courses. The behavior of the reinforced brick layer is similar to that of a reinforced concrete beam. The thin-shell, single-thickness brick structure derives its rigidity and strength from a double-curved catenary arch form that resists buckling failure. The structural masonry fulfills a structural function by supporting itself and the roof without beams or columns.

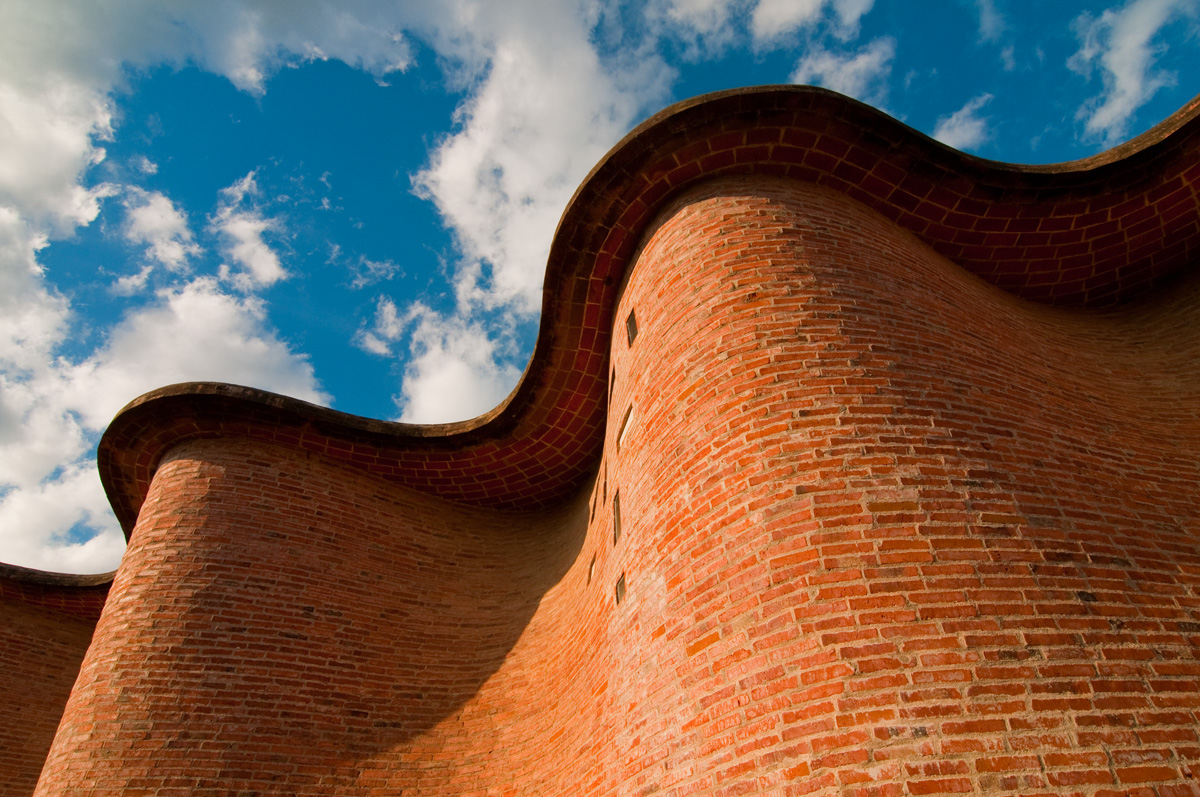
The brickwork of the wall of the Church of Christ the Worker and Our Lady of Lourdes fulfills a structural function by supporting itself and the roof without beams or columns.

This construction system allows the design of thin-shell, single-layer brick structures by combining bricks, iron and mortar, built on a movable "encofrados" used as scaffolding for people and formwork for materials. These gaussian vaults are structures that are able to withstand the loads placed on them thanks to their shape rather than their mass, resulting in a lower material requirement and in reduced construction times. The number of layers of bricks in which the reinforcing bar is placed depends on the span to be overcome. The reinforcement must be made of a corrosion-resistant alloy. Dieste used traditional locally sourced hollow bricks, which are typically 25x25x10 cm. The total thickness of Gaussian vaults are usually between 18 and 25 cm and spanning up to 45 meters.

== Usage ==
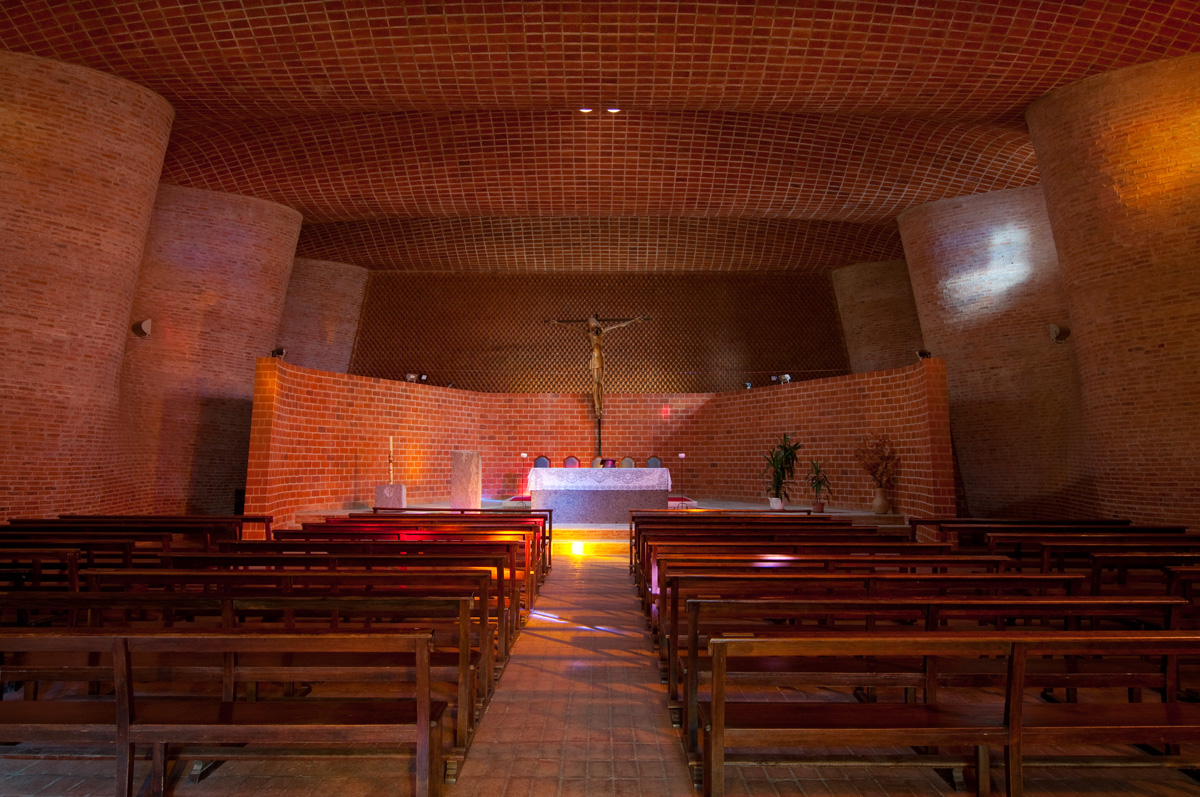
Gaussian vault of the Church of Christ the Worker and Our Lady of Lourdes

Reinforced brick masonry has been widely adopted because it allows for greater lightness, prefabrication and systematization in the repetition of its components, with competitive costs. They are particularly suited to the construction of churches, community centers and industrial buildings, as well as other structures that require large open spaces.

Dieste applied this construction technique to his first architectural work: the Church of Christ the Worker and Our Lady of Lourdes (1958–1960), in the small village of Atlántida. It became an renowned architectural landmark, described as "a simple rectangle, with side walls rising up in undulating curves to the maximum amplitude of their arcs, these walls supporting a similarly undulating roof, composed of a sequence of reinforced brick Gaussian vaults". In 2021 the Church was declared a UNESCO World Heritage Site under the name "The work of engineer Eladio Dieste: Church of Atlántida".

In 1998, Dieste used the same construction techniques in the Church of Saint John of Ávila in a modern neighbourhood of Alcalá de Henares, Spain.

== See also ==
- Catalan vault
- Guastavino tile
