= Estación Atlántida =

- Suburb of Atlántida
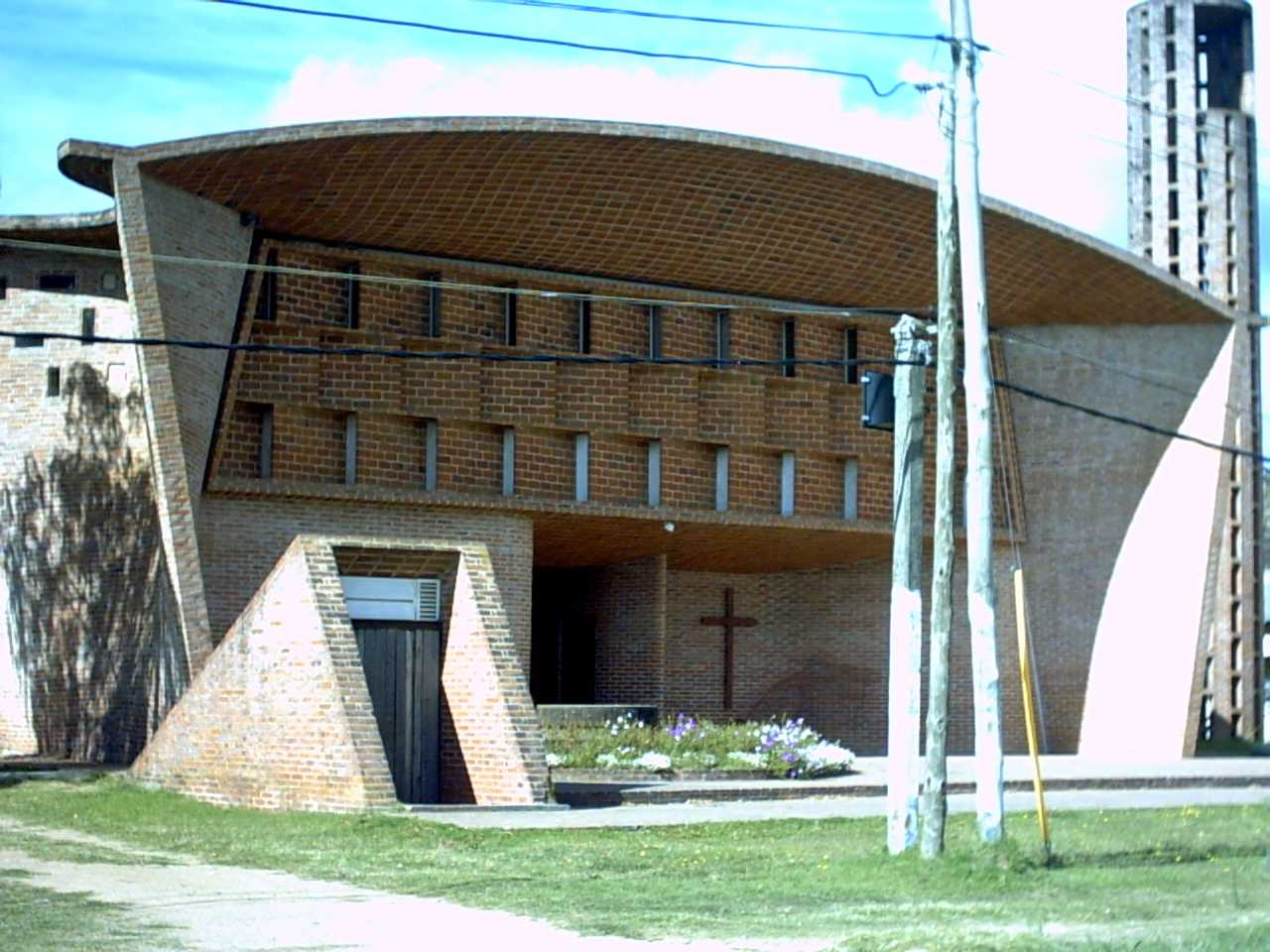
- Church of Estación Atlántida

- Location in Uruguay
- Coordinates: 34°45′0″S 55°46′0″W
- Country: Uruguay
- Department: Canelones Department

Population (2011)
  - Total: 2,274
- Time zone: UTC -3
- Postal code: 16000
- Dial plan: +598 437 (+5 digits)

Estación Atlántida is a northern suburb of the city Atlántida in the Canelones Department of southern Uruguay.

== Geography ==
=== Location ===
The suburb is located on Route 11, about 3 kilometres (1.9 mi) north of its junction with Ruta Interbalnearia. The railroad track that connects Montevideo with the city of Rocha passes from this place.

== Population ==
In 2011 Estación Atlántida had a population of 2,274.

Year	Population
1963	1,659
1975	1,843
1985	2,007
1996	2,297
2004	2,358
2011	2,274

Source: Instituto Nacional de Estadística de Uruguay

== Places of worship ==
- Parish Church of Christ the Worker and Our Lady of Lourdes (Roman Catholic), an architectural landmark of modernist architecture, built in 1958-60 by Eladio Dieste, World Heritage Site since 2021.
