= Horacio Terra Arocena =

Uruguayan architect and politician

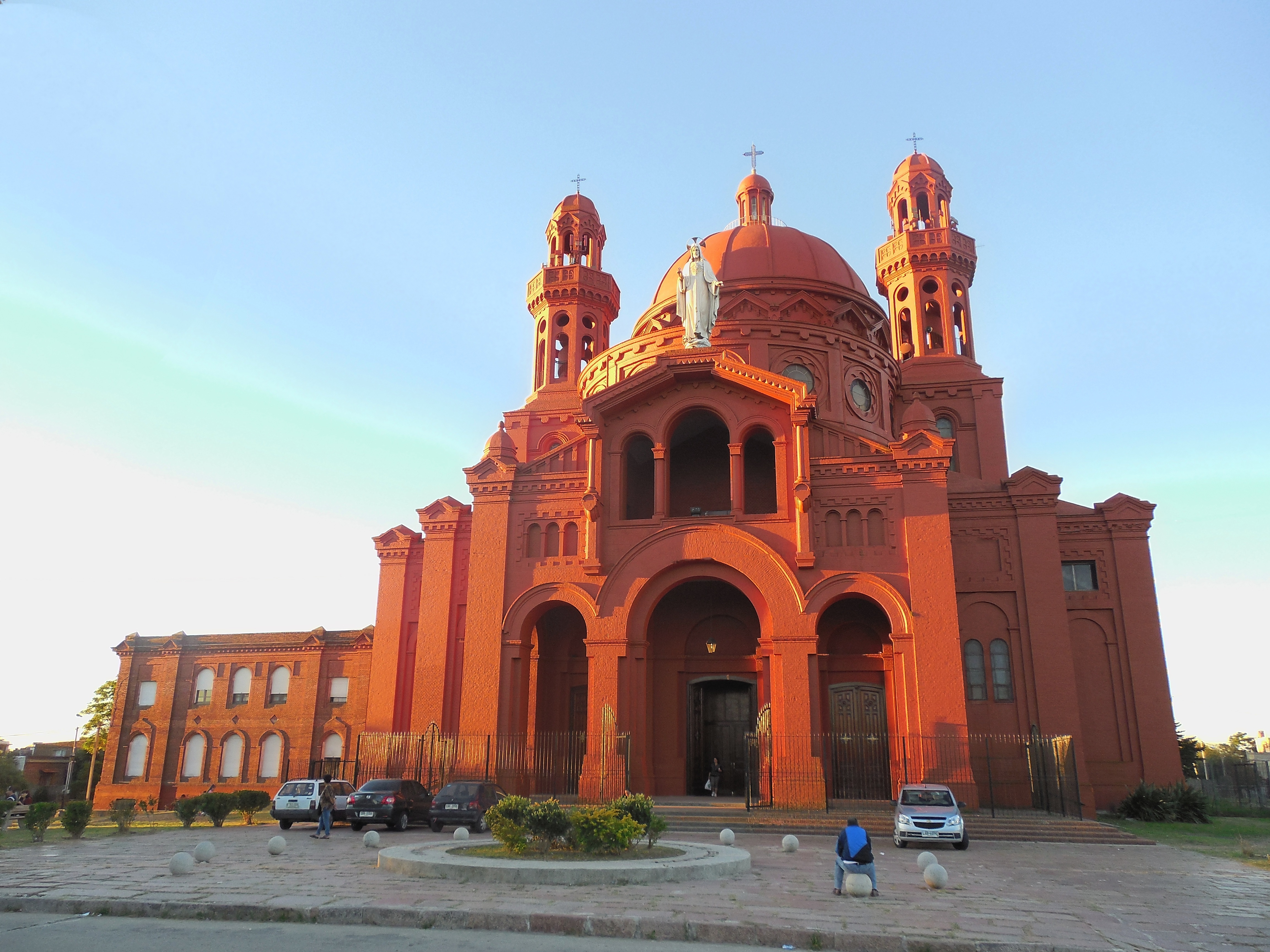

Horacio Terra Arocena (6 May 1894–1985) was a Uruguayan architect and political figure.

== Background ==
From a prominent political family, his uncle Gabriel Terra was President of Uruguay 1931–1938; his son Juan Pablo Terra served as a Deputy and a Senator. He married Margarita Gallinal Carbajal; among their children was Horacio Terra Gallinal.

He was an architect by profession.

== Political office ==
Horacio Terra Arocena served for years as a Senator. He was allied with Christian Democrats.

He was candidate to the National Council of Government in 1958 and 1962.

== Death ==
He died in 1985.

== Honors ==
- Knight of St. Gregory the Great

== See also ==
- Politics of Uruguay
- List of political families § Uruguay
