= Juan Carlos Figari =

- Juan Carlos Figari Castro
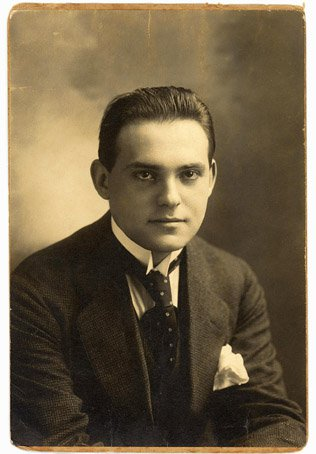
- Portrait of Juan Carlos Figari from the Fernando Saavedra Figari archives
- Born: Juan Carlos Figari Castro; 24 March 1893; Montevideo, Uruguay
- Died: 26 November 1927 (aged 34); Buenos Aires, Argentina
- Education: Académie Julian, Paris
- Known for: Painting, sculpture, architecture
- Notable work: paintings showcased in Museo Figari
- Style: Constructivism, Modernism
- Movement: Constructive Universalism
- Parent(s): Pedro Figari (father), María de Castro (mother)

Juan Carlos Figari Castro (1893–1927) was a Uruguayan painter, architect, and sculptor known for his distinctive artistic contributions and close association with his father, the renowned artist Pedro Figari. Although less widely recognized than his father, Juan Carlos Figari played a significant role in Uruguay's artistic landscape and contributed to both architectural projects and visual arts.

== Early Life and Background ==
Juan Carlos Figari was born in Montevideo, Uruguay, in 1893. He was the son of Pedro Figari, one of Uruguay's most celebrated artists and intellectuals. From a young age, Juan Carlos was exposed to artistic and cultural influences through his father's work, which greatly impacted his own creative path. He studied architecture and developed a keen interest in design, sculpture, and visual arts. His artistic output often reflected the same themes of Afro-Uruguayan culture, rural life, and social commentary that characterized his father's works. However, Juan Carlos infused his style with his own architectural sensibility, adding structured forms and dynamic compositions.

== Artistic career ==
=== Architectural Contributions ===
As an architect, Juan Carlos Figari contributed to several projects in Uruguay. His designs blended traditional elements with innovative techniques, reflecting both functional structure and artistic expression. Although his career in architecture was not as prolific as his father's achievements in painting, his work displayed a unique combination of modernist ideas and local cultural references. His architectural influence extended into his visual artworks, where strong structural forms and geometric designs became apparent.

=== Painting and Visual Arts ===
In the early 20th century, Juan Carlos Figari collaborated closely with his father. While Pedro Figari gained prominence for his post-impressionist depictions of Afro-Uruguayan life and historical themes, Juan Carlos became his assistant and key collaborator. Together, they traveled to Buenos Aires and Paris, where they exhibited their works.

Juan Carlos's individual artworks reveal a vibrant use of color and energetic brushstrokes. His paintings often captured festive street scenes, carnival motifs, and Afro-Uruguayan cultural expressions. His ability to combine architectural precision with expressive artistic freedom defined his distinctive style.

In 1921, Juan Carlos Figari exhibited alongside his father at the prestigious Galerie Druet in Paris, one of the most prominent art galleries at the time. While Pedro Figari's works dominated critical attention, Juan Carlos's contributions were noted for their lively compositions and complementary aesthetics.

== Notable works ==
Some of Juan Carlos Figari's most notable paintings include:

- "Carnaval Scene" – A vibrant portrayal of Uruguayan carnival traditions.
- "Barrio Sur" – A dynamic piece depicting Afro-Uruguayan communities.
- "Landscape with Figures" – An expressive composition blending architectural elements with human presence.
- "Fiesta en el Barrio" – A lively scene showcasing dance and celebration.

Many of his works are preserved at the Museo Figari in Montevideo, a museum dedicated to his father's legacy but also showcasing Juan Carlos Figari's artistic contributions.

== Collaboration with Pedro Figari ==
Juan Carlos Figari played a crucial role in managing and promoting his father's artistic career, especially during their time in Europe. His organizational skills and architectural training allowed him to design exhibition layouts and curate collections. The father-son collaboration was particularly fruitful during their time in Paris, where they sought to establish Uruguayan art in the international scene.

== Death and legacy ==
Juan Carlos Figari's life was cut short in 1927 when he died at the age of 34. Despite his early death, his contributions to Uruguayan visual arts and architecture remain significant. His works continue to be exhibited alongside those of his father, and the Museo Figari in Montevideo actively preserves and promotes his artistic legacy.

In recent years, renewed interest in Juan Carlos Figari's contributions has led to exhibitions focusing specifically on his distinct artistic style and his role in supporting Uruguayan modernist movements. His influence, though overshadowed by his father's fame, is recognized as an essential part of Uruguay's artistic heritage.
