= Gustavo Scheps =

Uruguayan architect and professor

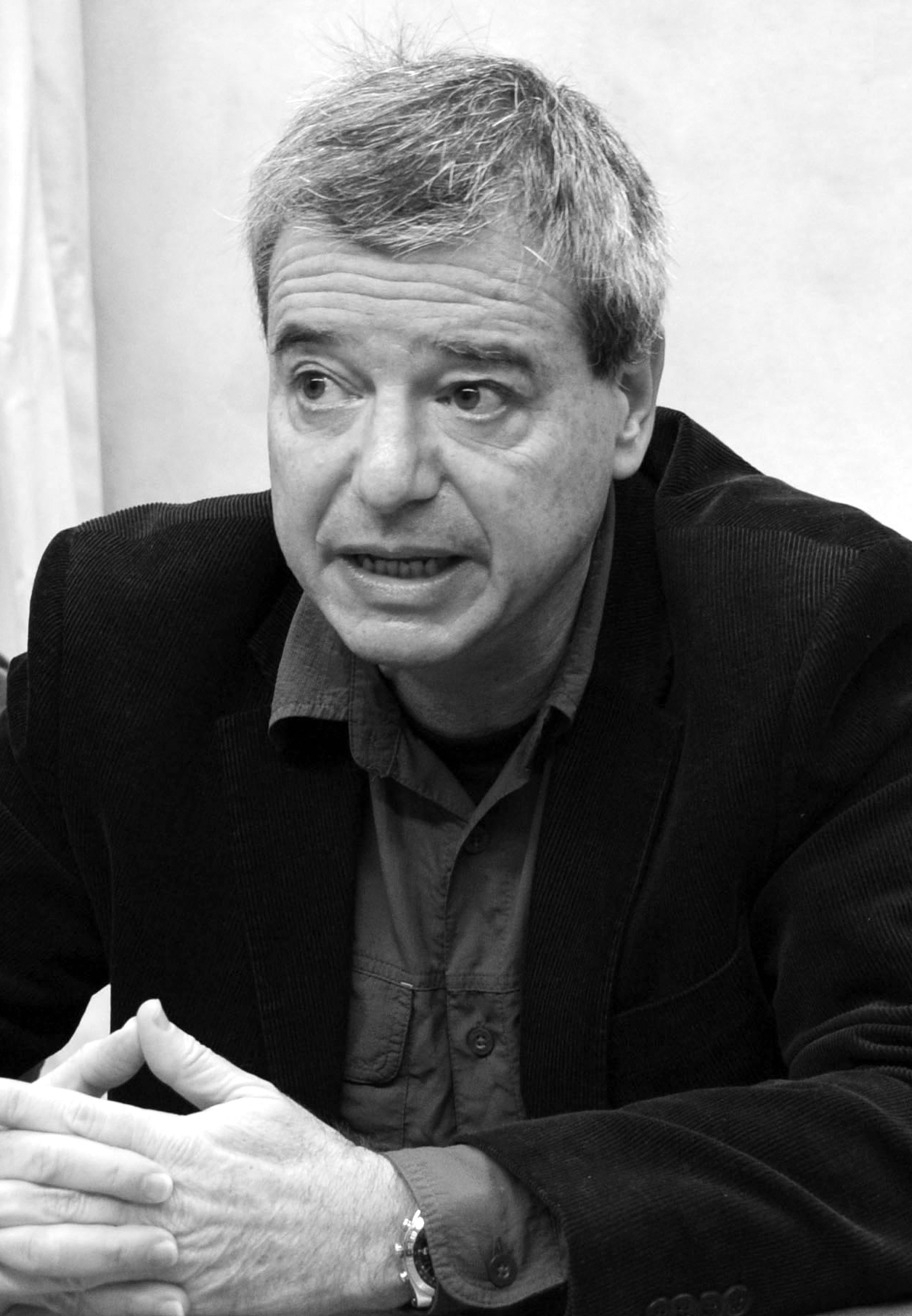
Gustavo Scheps

Juan Gustavo Scheps Grandal (Montevideo, 1 December 1954) is a Uruguayan architect and professor.

In 2009 he was elected Dean of the School of Architecture, University of the Republic. He was reelected in 2013.

== Works ==
- Family houses (with Martha Barreira), 1981–2008.
- Refurbishing of the old Machinery Hall of the School of Engineering, 1994–1998.
- Ciudad de las Tres Cruces (with Carriquiry, Falkenstein, Nogueira, Tuzman, Urruzola), 1995–2004.
- Centro Regional Norte, Universidad de la República, Salto (with Ana Fazakas), 1996–2002.
- Restoration of Julio Vilamajó's home and studio, 2007–2008.

== Publications ==
- Redes invisibles (1996)
- Puerto (2002)
