= Eladio Dieste =

Uruguayan engineer

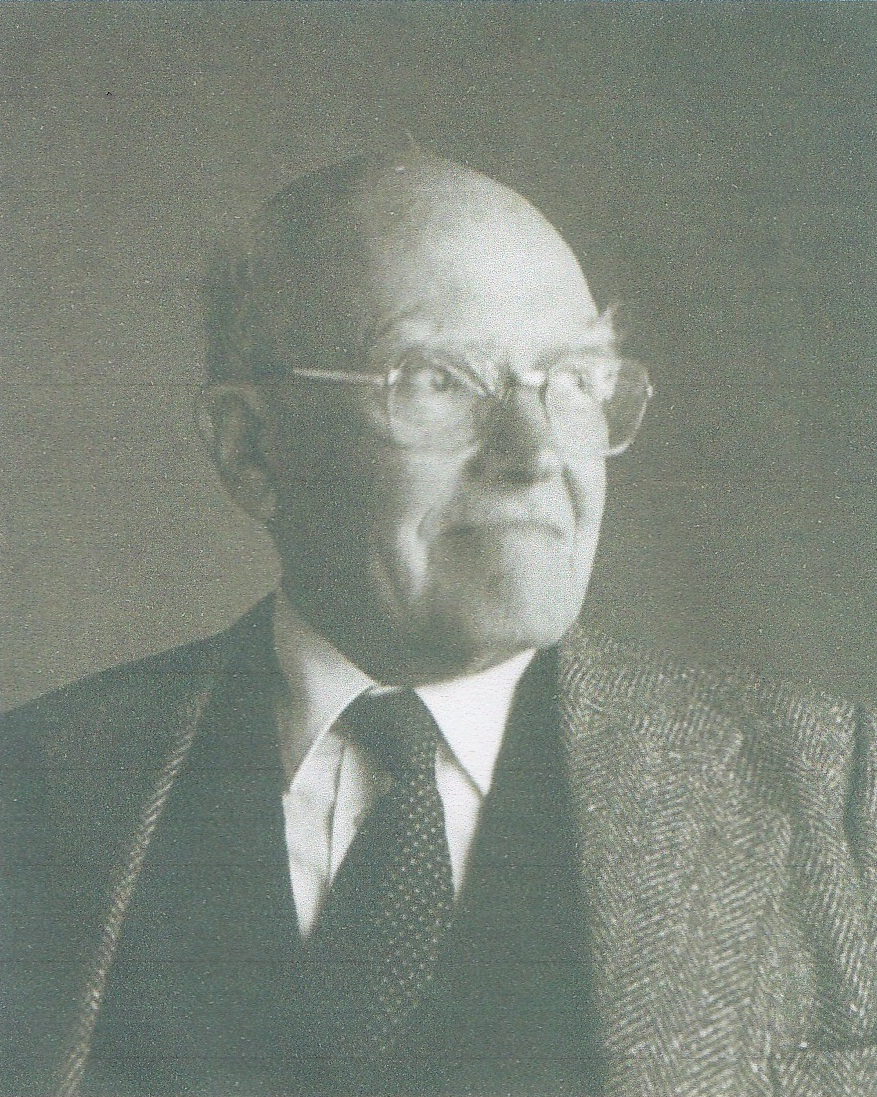
- Born: December 1, 1917; Artigas Department, Uruguay
- Died: July 29, 2000 (aged 82); Montevideo, Uruguay
- Known for: Structural engineering, thin-shell masonry vaults
- Notable work: Christ the Worker Church, Gaussian vault structures
- Style: Modernist, structural rationalism

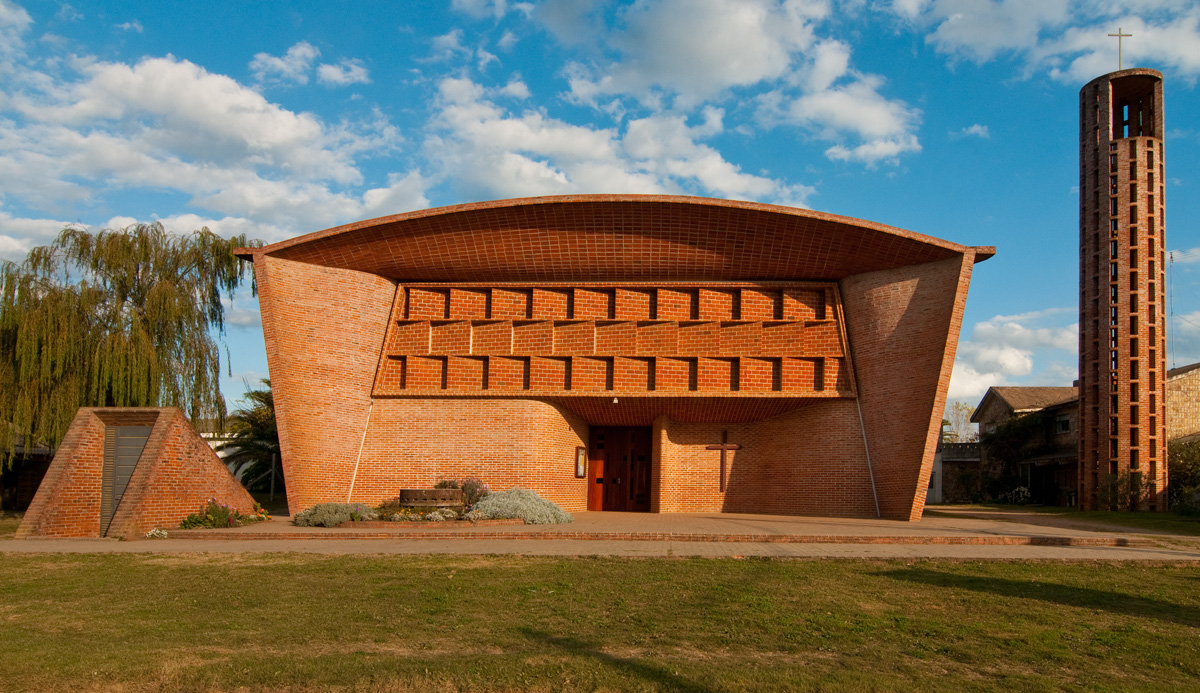
Cristo Obrero Church in Atlántida, Uruguay

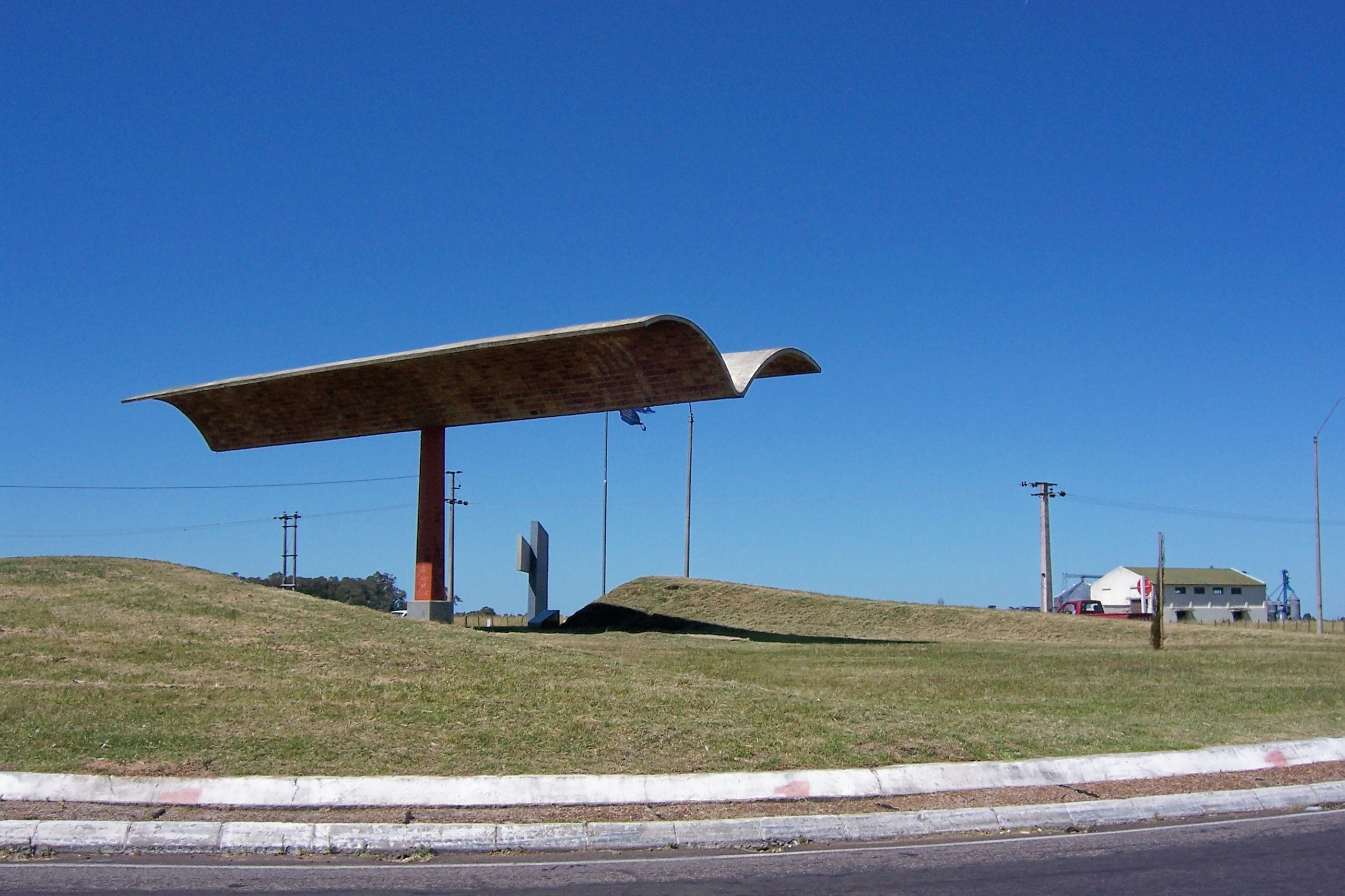
Door of Wisdom, locally nicknamed 'The Gull', a sculptural tribute to Dieste at Salto, Uruguay, using his techniques

Eladio Dieste (December 1, 1917 – July 29, 2000) was a Uruguayan civil engineer and inventor of the construction technique of reinforced brick masonry. He made his reputation by building a range of structures from grain silos, factory sheds, markets and churches, most of them in Uruguay.

== Early life and education ==
Dieste was born in Artigas, a town on Uruguay's northern border, the second of three sons of Eladio Dieste Muriel, a history teacher, and Elisa Saint-Martin Lamarque. His uncle was the Spanish Galician poet and playwright Rafael Dieste. He was schooled in Salto and moved to Montevideo in 1936 to study at the Facultad de Ingeniería of the Universidad de la República, lodging in the house of the jurist Antonio Grompone, who became his intellectual mentor. He graduated as a civil engineer in 1943.

== Reinforced ceramics and the Gaussian vault ==
Dieste's structural system places steel reinforcement in the joints between courses of locally made hollow brick, bonded with sand-cement mortar, so that the brick membrane behaves analogously to reinforced concrete but at a fraction of the cost and weight. The shells were laid over reusable, moveable formwork and frequently prestressed — techniques ahead of contemporary practice in the industrialised world. His signature Gaussian vault gives the cross-section a double curvature along an inverted catenary, generating stiffness against buckling in shells often only one brick thick, with spans of up to about 45 metres and a typical span-to-rise ratio of 10.

Metal-reinforced masonry had precedents — Paul Cottancin's 1889 patent, Rafael Guastavino's 1910 reinforced tile shells, and Eduardo Torroja's 1920s experiments with cerámica armada — but Dieste, initially unaware of these developments, carried the idea further than anyone, at the very moment rising formwork and labour costs were making thin concrete shells uneconomical. For Dieste the choice of brick was ethical and economic as much as structural: an inexpensive, locally produced material assembled by ordinary masons, suited to the resources of South America. He summarised his structural philosophy as achieving resistance through form rather than through the accumulation of material. David P. Billington's category of "structural art" — excellence in efficiency, economy and elegance — is regularly applied to his work.

== Career ==
After graduating, Dieste worked as a bridge engineer for the roads directorate of Uruguay's Ministry of Public Works (1944–1947), as an engineer for the Danish contractor Christiani & Nielsen (1945–1948), and as head of the technical office of the ministry's architecture directorate; from 1949 to 1958 he directed the foundations and piling firm Viermond S.A. In parallel he taught at the Facultad de Ingeniería from 1943 until 1973 — the year the university was intervened by the civic–military dictatorship — in theoretical mechanics and in bridges and large structures.

His first experiment with reinforced brick came in 1946–1947, when the Catalan architect Antoni Bonet i Castellana asked him to engineer the timbrel-inspired vaults of the Berlingieri house at Punta Ballena, Maldonado. In 1956 he founded, with fellow engineer Eugenio R. Montañez (1916–2001), the design-and-construction firm Dieste y Montañez S.A., through which nearly all of his subsequent work was built and which remains in operation. The firm ultimately built more than 1.5 million square metres of vaulted structures. By the Fundación's account, Dieste completed more than 140 works in reinforced ceramics in Uruguay, 43 in Argentina, 27 in Brazil and 5 in Spain.

Outside building construction, Dieste held patents on construction and piling methods, co-founded Ingenieros Consultores Latinoamericanos, and served as a consulting engineer on the Salto Grande Dam (1973–1989) and the Constitución (Palmar) Dam, as well as on bridges for the Uruguayan state railways.

A particular innovation was his Gaussian vault, a thin-shell structure for roofs in single-thickness brick, that derives its stiffness and strength from a double curvature catenary arch form that resists buckling failure.

There were several architects and engineers in South and Latin America who were working in the modernist language, such as Guillermo Gonzalez Zuleta in Colombia, Carlos Raúl Villanueva in Venezuela and Félix Candela in Mexico, who brought architecture and structural engineering into close proximity, especially when undertaking humble commissions. His buildings were mostly roofed with thin shell vaults constructed of brick and ceramic tiles. These forms were cheaper than reinforced concrete, and didn't require ribs and beams. In developing this approach, even in comparison with modernists the world over, he was an innovator.

Dieste is quoted about his use of materials and structure:

There are deep moral/practical reasons for our search which give form to our work: with the form we create we can adjust to the laws of matter with all reverence, forming a dialogue with reality and its mysteries in essential communion... For architecture to be truly constructed, the materials must be used with profound respect for their essence and possibilities; only thus can 'cosmic economy' be achieved... in agreement with the profound order of the world; only then can have that authority that so astounds us in the great works of the past.

With regard to structure Dieste stated:

The resistant virtues of the structure that we make depend on their form; it is through their form that they are stable and not because of an awkward accumulation of materials. There is nothing more noble and elegant from an intellectual viewpoint than this; resistance through form.

Many of the techniques that he developed to achieve these forms, such as pre-stressing of brickwork and moveable formworks, were in advance of contemporary techniques in the developed world.

He died, aged 82, in Montevideo.

== Selected works ==
- St. Peter Church in Durazno
- Christ the Worker Church in Estación Atlántida
- Church of Our Lady of Lourdes in Malvín
- St. John of Avila Church in Alcalá de Henares
- Teatro de Verano Ramón Collazo in Montevideo
- Montevideo Shopping (structure of the first stage, 1985; architect: Guillermo Gómez Platero)
- Church of St. Charles Borromeo (structural calculation, 1956; architect: Juan Pablo Terra)

== Sources ==
- Anderson, Stanford, ed. (2004). Eladio Dieste : innovation in structural art. Princeton Architectural Press. ISBN 1-56898-371-9. |
- Curtis, William (2002). Modern Architecture since 1900. Phaidon. ISBN 0-7148-3356-8.
- Pedreschi, Remo (2000). Eladio Dieste – The Engineer's Contribution to Contemporary Architecture. Thomas Telford. ISBN 0-7277-2772-9.
- Fausto Giovannardi "Eladio Dieste: un'ingegneria magica", Fausto Giovannardi. Borgo San Lorenzo, 2007.
