= Rosario Etchebarne =

Uruguayan architect

- Born: María del Rosario Etchebarne Scandroglio; Montevideo, Uruguay
- Education: University of the Republic (Uruguay)
- Occupation: Architect
- Spouse: Vicente Ruétalo
- Children: 3

Rosario Etchebarne is a Uruguayan architect who specializes in the development and implementation of bioconstruction techniques using earthen designs, materials and construction.

== Biography ==
Etchebarne, whose full name is María del Rosario Etchebarne Scandroglio, was born in Montevideo, Uruguay. She entered the Faculty of Architecture at the University of the Republic in 1973. In late 1979, she traveled to Salto on a scholarship, where she worked as a student intern on the Salto Grande Dam project. She graduated from the university with a degree in architecture in 1982.

In 1993, she began her role as a professor coordinating the Technology Area at the University of the Republic in Salto, as part of the team that researches, advises on, and builds earthen houses. Her expertise is in Bioconstruction, which uses building materials that don't pollute or contaminate the environment. She uses adobe, cob, wattle and daub (a mixed technique), and compressed earth blocks to experience the country's "local building culture firsthand." Proponents believe these materials are "almost alive because wood, earth, rice husks, straw and reeds don't release carbon dioxide into the atmosphere and don't require fuel for their production process."

She took responsibility for the training and technology transfer of three earthen design and construction projects funded by the country's Ministry of Housing and Territorial Planning in the departments of Salto, Canelones and Montevideo.

Etchebarne has co-authored four books, including "Manual de Construcción con tierra" (Manual of Earth Construction), published in 1997.

In 1994, with Gabriela Piñeiro and Ana Beasley, she presented a paper on mud houses at a conference in Cuba, which is part of the Regional Unit for Habitat Studies and Management. She traveled to Bolivia for training in 1995 and to Colombia the following year. In 2009, she reached Level 4 at the university, beginning to develop teaching, research, and outreach programs in the field of technology.

=== Memberships ===
- Assembly of the Faculty of the Northern Regional Faculty and the scientific and technological area.
- UNESCO Chair "Earth Architectures, Building Cultures and Sustainable Development" (based in France) and of the Ibero-American Proterra Network.
- Assembly of the Faculty of the Northern Regional Faculty and the scientific and technological area

=== Personal life ===
She married photographer Vicente Ruétalo and they have three children.

== Selected works ==
- Etchebarne, Rosario. "A REFLECTION ON THE DESIGN OF EARTH ARCHITECTURES." Proceedings of the Ibero-American Seminar on Architecture and Construction with Earth-SIACOT 10 (2010).
- Salmar, Eduardo, Rosario Etchebarne, and Rodolfo Rotondaro. "Teaching architecture and earth construction: experiences and critical reflection in three Latin American universities in Argentina, Brazil and Uruguay." Proceedings of the Ibero-American Seminar on Architecture and Earth Construction-SIACOT 13 (2013): 967-975.
- Etchebarne, Rosario, and Vicente Ruétalo. "Earth houses in Uruguay." In Earth, society, community: 15th Ibero-American Seminar on Architecture and Construction with Earth, pp. 477–485. University of Cuenca, 2015.
- Etchebarne, Rosario. "Management, earthen house and constructive culture." Technology Texts 05 (2022).
