= David P. Billington =

American civil engineer

- Born: June 1, 1927; Bryn Mawr, Pennsylvania
- Died: March 25, 2018 (aged 90); Los Angeles, California
- Education: Princeton University (B.S.E.)
- Known for: Structural art
- Awards: Dexter Prize (1979); National Academy of Engineering (1986); Charles A. Dana Award (1990)
- Scientific career
- Fields: Structural engineering, Civil engineering
- Workplaces: Roberts and Schaefer Company; Princeton University

David Perkins Billington (June 1, 1927 – March 25, 2018) was an American structural engineer and educator. He was the Gordon Y.S. Wu Professor of Engineering at Princeton University, where he taught for 50 years. Billington is best known for pioneering the discipline of structural art, a concept establishing that engineering design is a creative discipline distinct from architecture, defined by the integration of efficiency, economy, and elegance.

== Early life and education ==
Billington was born in Bryn Mawr, Pennsylvania, on June 1, 1927, to Nelson and Jane Coolbaugh Billington. He served as a radar technician in the United States Navy from 1945 to 1946.

He attended Princeton University, where he studied basic engineering, a curriculum that allowed him to take courses in the humanities alongside mechanical, electrical, chemical, and aeronautical engineering. He graduated with a Bachelor of Science in Engineering (B.S.E.) in 1950.

Following graduation, Billington received a Fulbright Scholarship to study structural engineering in Belgium from 1950 to 1952. During his fellowship at the University of Louvain and the University of Ghent, he studied bridge construction and prestressed concrete under Gustave Magnel. While in Belgium, he met Phyllis Bergquist, a fellow Fulbright Scholar studying piano at the Royal Conservatory of Brussels; they married in Chicago in 1951.

== Career ==
=== Structural design ===
In 1952, Billington joined the Roberts and Schaefer Company in New York City as a structural engineer. Mentored by Anton Tedesko, he spent eight years designing bridges, aircraft hangars, and thin-shell structures. His notable projects during this period included the structure for the St. Louis Lambert International Airport terminal, a hangar for Hill Air Force Base in Utah (which had the longest-span prestressed concrete roof in the United States at the time), Pier 40 in New York, and Launch Complex 36 at Cape Canaveral.

=== Academic career ===
Billington began lecturing part-time at Princeton University in 1958 and joined the faculty full-time as an associate professor of Civil Engineering in 1960. He was promoted to Professor in 1964 and was named the Gordon Y.S. Wu Professor of Engineering in 1996. Between 1990 and 2008, Billington served as the director of the Program on Architecture and Engineering. He transferred to emeritus status in 2010.

At Princeton, Billington developed "Humanistic Studies in Engineering," an approach that integrated the study of engineering works with their social and historical contexts. He created two popular courses that bridged engineering and the liberal arts: "Structures and the Urban Environment" (begun in 1974) and "Engineering in the Modern World" (begun in 1985). By the time of his retirement, it was estimated that one in four Princeton undergraduates had taken one of his courses.

== Structural Art ==
Billington coined the term structural art to describe works of engineering that transcend pure utility to become objects of beauty. He argued that structural art is a discipline parallel to, but independent of, architecture; while architects control space, structural engineers control forces.

According to Billington, a work of structural art must satisfy the "three E's":

- Efficiency: The scientific use of minimum materials to support loads (Scientific).
- Economy: The management of costs to benefit society (Social).
- Elegance: The expressive form chosen by the engineer (Symbolic).

His scholarship focused on "structural artists" who exemplified these ideals, such as Thomas Telford, Gustave Eiffel, John A. Roebling, Robert Maillart, Félix Candela, Christian Menn, Fazlur Khan, and Heinz Isler. In 1973, he founded the Maillart Archive at Princeton to document the work of the Swiss engineer Robert Maillart, whose bridges Billington regarded as primary examples of structural art.

== Awards and honors ==
Billington received numerous awards for his contributions to engineering education and history:

- Dexter Prize from the Society for the History of Technology (1979) for Robert Maillart's Bridges.
- Election to the National Academy of Engineering (1986).
- History and Heritage Award from the American Society of Civil Engineers (ASCE) (1986).
- Charles A. Dana Award for Pioneering Achievement in Education (1990).
- New Jersey Professor of the Year by the Carnegie Foundation for the Advancement of Teaching (1995).
- Fellow of the American Academy of Arts and Sciences (1998).
- Distinguished Teaching Scholar Award from the National Science Foundation (2003).
- Honorary Degree from Princeton University (2015).

In 1999, Engineering News-Record named him one of the top five educators in civil engineering since 1874.

== Personal life ==
Billington was the brother of James H. Billington, the Librarian of Congress. He was married to Phyllis Bergquist for 66 years until his death. They had six children and eleven grandchildren. Billington died in Los Angeles on March 25, 2018, at the age of 90.

== Selected publications ==
- Billington, David P. (1965). Thin Shell Concrete Structures. McGraw-Hill.
- Billington, David P. (1979). Robert Maillart's Bridges: The Art of Engineering. Princeton University Press. ISBN 978-0691082035.
- Billington, David P. (1983). The Tower and the Bridge: The New Art of Structural Engineering. Basic Books. ISBN 978-0691023939.
- Billington, David P. (1996). The Innovators: The Engineering Pioneers Who Made America Modern. Wiley. ISBN 978-0471140269.
- Billington, David P. (1997). Robert Maillart: Builder, Designer, and Artist. Cambridge University Press. ISBN 978-0521571326.
- Billington, David P. (2003). The Art of Structural Design: A Swiss Legacy. Princeton University Art Museum. ISBN 978-0300097863.
- Billington, David P.; Billington Jr., David P. (2006). Power, Speed, and Form: Engineers and the Making of the Twentieth Century. Princeton University Press. ISBN 978-0691102924.
- Garlock, Maria E. Moreyra; Billington, David P. (2008). Félix Candela: Engineer, Builder, Structural Artist. Yale University Press. ISBN 978-0300122091.

== Sources ==
- Billington Jr., David P. (2012). "David P. Billington: Highlights of an Engineering Life". In Hines, Eric M.; Buonopane, Stephen G.; Garlock, Maria E. Moreyra (eds.). Festschrift Billington 2012 (PDF). International Network for Structural Art. pp. 246–251.
- Hines, Eric M.; Buonopane, Stephen G.; Garlock, Maria E. Moreyra (2012). "Preface". In Hines, Eric M.; Buonopane, Stephen G.; Garlock, Maria E. Moreyra (eds.). Festschrift Billington 2012 (PDF). International Network for Structural Art. pp. 8–9.
- "In Memoriam: David Billington '50". Princeton Alumni Weekly. April 25, 2018.
- "David Perkins Billington". Office of the Dean of the Faculty. Princeton University.
- Sullivan, John (April 5, 2018). "David Billington, scholar of structural art, dies at 90". Princeton Engineering. Princeton University.
