= San Juan de Ávila, Alcalá de Henares =

Roman Catholic parish church in Alcalá de Henares, Spain

Coordinates: 40.4930°N 3.3769°W

Iglesia de San Juan de Ávila
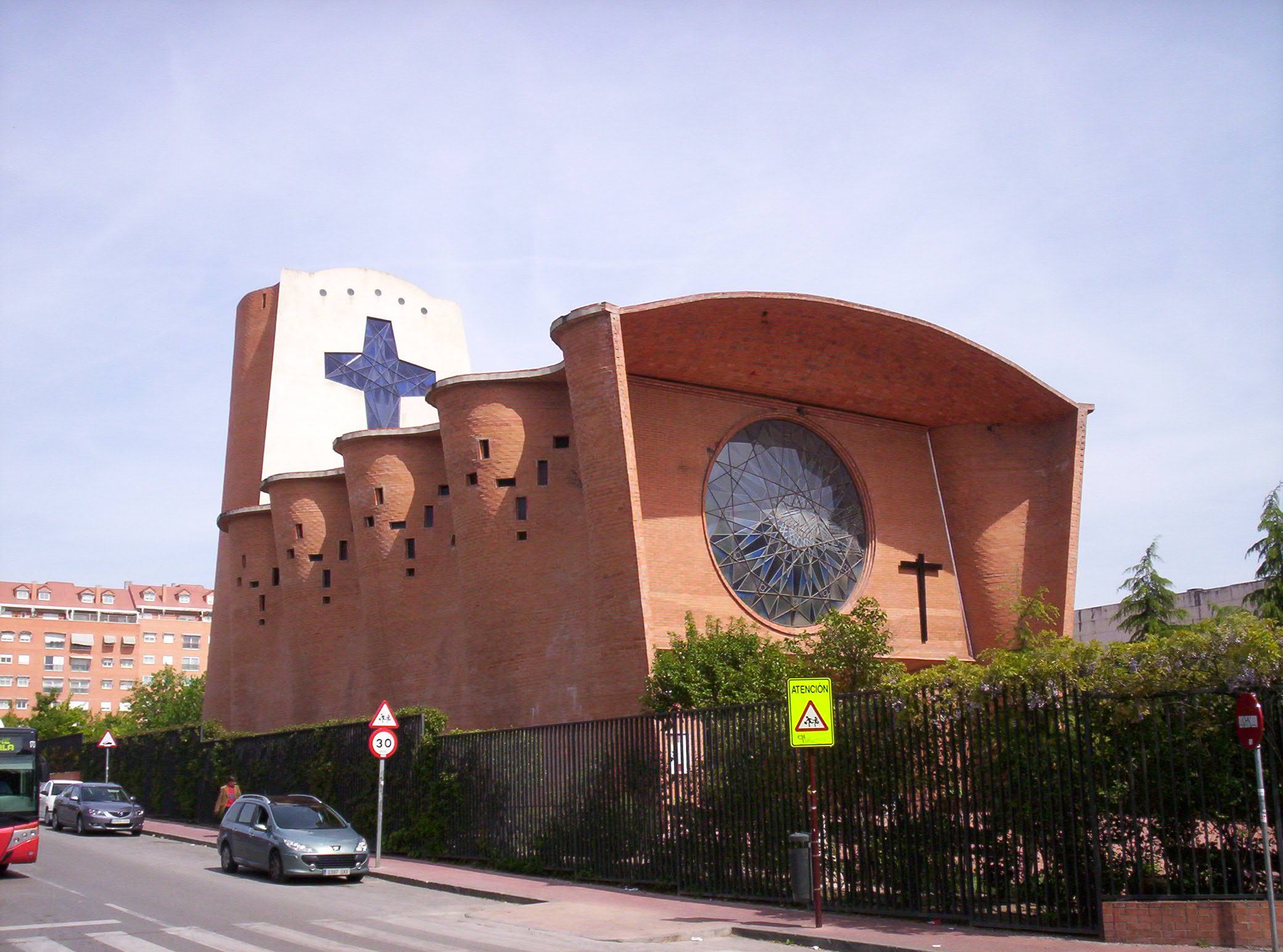

Religion
- Affiliation: Roman Catholic
- Ecclesiastical or organizational status: Parish church

Location
- Location: Alcalá de Henares, Spain
- Interactive map of Iglesia de San Juan de Ávila

Architecture
- Architect: Eladio Dieste
- Type: Church

The Church of Saint John of Ávila (Spanish: Iglesia de San Juan de Ávila) is a Roman Catholic parish church located in a modern neighbourhood of Alcalá de Henares, Spain.

The current temple was built in brickwork by Uruguayan engineer-architect Eladio Dieste; the dimensions of walls and roofs are very slim, thanks to reinforced ceramics.

It is dedicated to saint John of Ávila.

It is interesting to point out that, originally, this church was going to be built in Uruguay (Our Lady of Lourdes Church in Malvín); as the economic situation made this impossible, only the apse was built.
