= Iglesia de Cristo Obrero y Nuestra Señora de Lourdes =

Roman Catholic parish church and World Heritage Site in Estación Atlántida, Uruguay

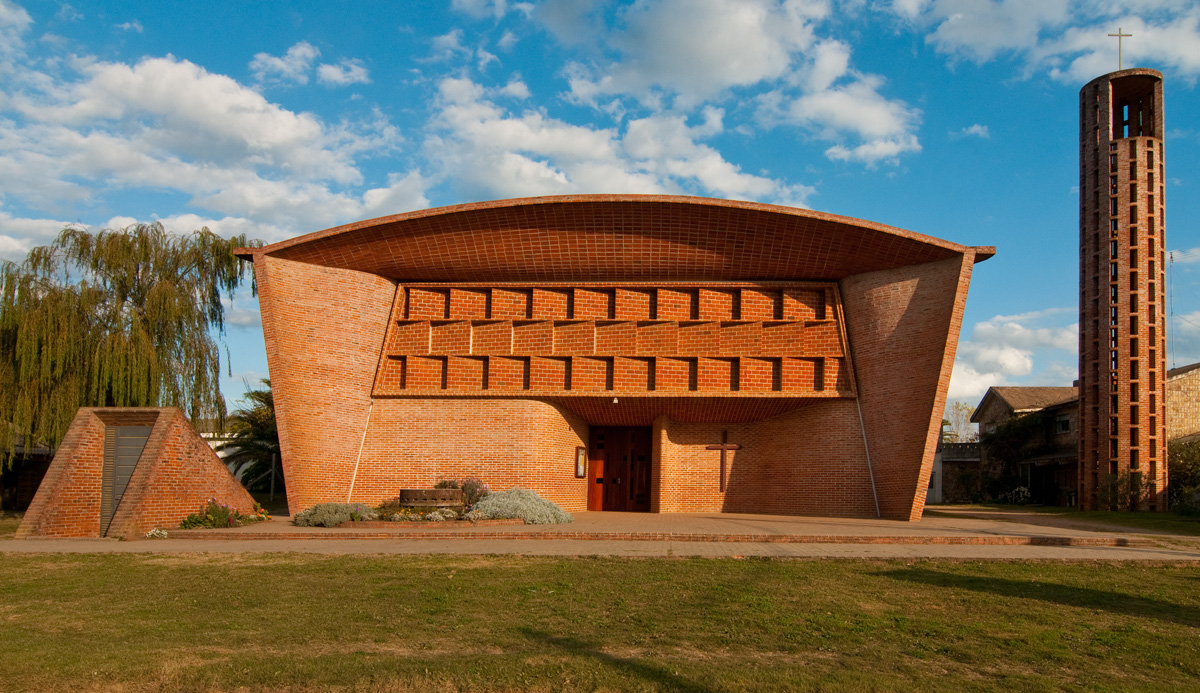
- Façade of the Iglesia de Estación Atlántida, 2011

- Location within Uruguay

Religion
- Affiliation: Roman Catholic
- Rite: Roman Rite
- Ecclesiastical or organizational status: Parish church
- Year consecrated: 1960
- Status: Active

Location
- Location: Estación Atlántida, Uruguay
- Interactive map of Iglesia de Cristo Obrero y Nuestra Señora de Lourdes
- Coordinates: 34.74392°S 55.7664°W

Architecture
- Architect: Eladio Dieste
- Type: Church
- Style: Modernist
- Materials: Brick
- UNESCO World Heritage Site
- Official name: The work of engineer Eladio Dieste: Church of Atlántida
- Criteria: Cultural: (iv)
- Designated: 2021 (44th session)
- Reference no.: 1612
- State Party: Uruguay
- Region: Latin America

The Church of Christ the Worker and Our Lady of Lourdes (Spanish: Iglesia de Cristo Obrero y Nuestra Señora de Lourdes), also known simply as Iglesia de Estación Atlántida, is a Roman Catholic parish church and a World Heritage Site in Estación Atlántida, Uruguay.

== Description ==
The temple is dedicated to Christ the Worker and Our Lady of Lourdes. It constitutes a renowned architectural landmark, it was designed in 1958 by the engineer Eladio Dieste. It is architecturally striking, described as "a simple rectangle, with side walls rising up in undulating curves to the maximum amplitude of their arcs" these walls supporting a similarly undulating roof, composed of a sequence of reinforced brick Gaussian vaults developed by Eladio Dieste.

The cylindrical bell-tower, built in openwork exposed brick masonry, rises from the ground to the right of the main church facade, while the underground baptistery is located on the left side of the parvis, accessible from a triangular prismatic entrance and illuminated via a central oculus.

The Church provides an eminent example of the remarkable formal and spatial achievements of modern architecture in Latin America during the second part of the 20th century, embodying the search for social equality with a spare use of resources, meeting structural imperatives to great aesthetic effect.

The material is a very simple brickwork, which conforms a novel utilization of exposed bricks in a reinforced ceramics structure.

In 2021 the Church was proclaimed as a UNESCO World Heritage Site under the name "The work of engineer Eladio Dieste: Church of Atlántida".
