= Juan Pablo Terra =

Uruguayan architect, sociologist and political figure

Juan Pablo Terra (1924–1991) was a Uruguayan architect, sociologist, and political figure.

== Background ==
His father Horacio Terra Arocena served as a Senator. His great-uncle Gabriel Terra was President of Uruguay 1931–1938.

Carrera Graduated as an architect at the University of the Republic in 1950. He worked as a professor of Sociology and Research Methodology at the Faculty of Architecture from 1958 to 1987. This integrated the Directing Council of the Faculty of Architecture and the first Directing Council of the Faculty of Social Sciences of the University of the Republic.

== Political offices ==
Juan Pablo Terra served both as a Deputy and a Senator.

Having begun his political career as a Uruguayan Christian Democrat, he subsequently represented the Frente Amplio (Broad Front) in the Senate, a grouping which he played a leading part in founding in 1971.

Some of his brothers also ventured into politics: Francisco in the Colorado Party, and Horacio in the National Party, (towards the end of the civic-military dictatorship, he chaired the Human Rights Commission that filed numerous complaints)..

== Private life ==
He married to María del Carmen Ortiz, with whom he has eight children. Both by kinship and by affinity he was linked to a greater or lesser extent to numerous wealthy families that have had an important influence on Uruguayan politics throughout its history, such as the Terra, Arocena, Gallinal, Artagaveytia, Heber, Bordaberry, Urioste, etc.

== See also ==
- Politics of Uruguay
- List of political families § Uruguay
