= List of Catholic churches in Uruguay =

This is a list of Catholic churches in Uruguay.

== Archdiocese of Montevideo ==
The Roman Catholic Archdiocese of Montevideo is divided into ten Pastoral Zones.

=== Zone 1 ===
- Cathedral of the Immaculate Conception, St. Philip and St. James
- Parish Church of Our Lady of Mt. Carmel (Cordón)
- Parish Church of St. Francis of Assisi
- Parish Church of St. Michael Garicoits (Iglesia de los Vascos)
- Parish Church of St. Anthony and St. Clare
- Parish Church of Our Lady of Lourdes and St. Vincent Pallotti
- Parish Church of St. Joseph and St. Maximilian Kolbe (Conventuales)
- Parish Church of the Sacred Heart (Seminario)
- Charity Chapel, Maciel Hospital
- Shrine of the Resurrected Lord (Tres Cruces)

=== Zone 2 ===
- Parish Church of Our Lady of Mt Carmel (Aguada)
- Parish Church of the Immaculate Heart of Mary (St. Pancras)
- Parish Church of Our Lady of the Guard
- Parish Church of St Michael Archangel
- Parish Church of Saint Antoninus
- Parish Church of Our Lady of Bzommar
- Church of Our Lady of Luján (St. Expeditus)
- Parish Church of Our Lady of Mercy and St. Jude Taddhaeus, which is also a pilgrimage sanctuary

=== Zone 3 ===
- Parish Church of Our Lady of Sorrows (Reducto)
- Parish Church of St. Charles Borromeo and Our Lady of the Assumption
- Parish Church of Our Lady of Perpetual Help and St. Alphonsus (Tapes)
- Chapel of Our Lady of the Rosary (Maturana)
- Parish Church of the Holy Family (Jackson Chapel)
- Parish Church of Our Lady of Mt. Carmel and St. Saint Thérèse of Lisieux (Carmelites)

=== Zone 4 ===
- Parish Church of Our Lady of Help (Cerro)
- Parish Church of the Immaculate Conception (Paso Molino)
- Parish Church of St. Francis of Assisi (Nuevo París)
- Blessed Francesca Rubatto Sanctuary Chapel
- Parish Church of the Holy Family (La Teja)
- Parish Church of St. Raphael Archangel (Cerro Norte)
- Parish Church of Our Lady of the Guard and St. Aloysius Gonzaga (La Barra)
- Parish Church of the Immaculate Conception (Rincón del Cerro)
- Parish Church of Our Lady of Fatima (Cerro)
- Parish Church of the Curé of Ars and St Helena (Punta Yeguas)
- Parish Church of Jesus the Worker (Paso de la Arena)
- Parish Church of St. Alberto Hurtado

=== Zone 5 ===
- Parish Church of St Albert (Peñarol)
- Parish Church of Mary Help of Christians (Villa Colón), which is also a pilgrimage sanctuary
- Parish Church of the Immaculate Conception (Paso de las Duranas)
- Parish Church of St Vincent Pallotti
- Parish Church of Our Lady of Lebanon
- Parish Church of St Mary and St Pius X (Melilla)
- Parish Church of St Mary Mother of the Church and St John Bosco (Colón)

=== Zone 6 ===
- Parish Church of St. John the Baptist (Pocitos)
- Parish Church of Mary Help of Christians
- Parish Church of Our Lady of the Sacred Heart (Punta Carretas)
- Parish Church of Our Lady of Fatima
- Parish Church of Our Lady of the Rosary and St. Dominic (Dominicans)
- Parish Church of Our Lady of the Orchard and St. Joseph
- Parish Church of St. Alexander and St. Peter Claver

=== Zone 7 ===
- Parish Church of Our Lady of Lourdes (Malvín)
- Parish Church of Stella Maris (Carrasco)
- Parish Church of St. Joseph of the Mountain and St. Teresa of Avila
- Chapel of St. Joseph of the Mountain
- Parish Church of St. Rita of Cascia (Punta Gorda)
- Parish Church of St Bernadette Soubirous
- Parish Church of Jesus the Mercyful (Belén)

=== Zone 8 ===
- Sanctuary of the Miraculous Medal and St. Augustine (Unión), which is also a pilgrimage sanctuary
- Parish Church of Our Lady of Sorrows (Holy Land)
- Parish Church of Our Lady of Mt. Carmel and St. Cajetan (Comercio)
- Parish Church of the Holy Apostles
- Parish Church of St. Peter Apostle (Buceo)
- Parish Church of St Ignatius of Loyola
- Parish Church of St. Joseph the Worker
- Parish Church of St. Vincent de Paul
- Parish Church of Our Lady of the Assumption (Italian Catholic Mission)

=== Zone 9 ===
- Parish Church of the Holy Savior and National Shrine Grotto of Lourdes, which is also a pilgrimage sanctuary
- Parish Church of Our Lady of Guadalupe
- National Shrine of the Heart of Jesus (Cerrito de la Victoria), which is also a pilgrimage sanctuary
- Parish Church of the Sacred Hearts (Possolo)
- Parish Church of the Annunciation
- Parish Church of Our Lady of the Rosary of Pompei
- Parish Church of St. Madeleine Sophie Barat (Aires Puros)
- Parish Church of St. Thérèse of Lisieux
- Parish Church of Our Lady of the Foundation
- Parish Church of St. Lawrence
- Parish Church of Our Lady of Mt. Carmel
- Parish Church of Our Lady of the Thirty-Three
- Parish Church of St. Joseph Husband of Mary

=== Zone 10 ===
- Christ of Toledo Parish Church (Villa García)
- St. Joseph of Manga Chapel (Jacksonville)
- Parish Church of Our Lady of the Sacred Heart and St. Rita (Maroñas), which is also a pilgrimage sanctuary
- Parish Church of the Most Holy Trinity and the Holy Family
- Parish Church of the Sacred Heart of Jesus (Vera)
- Parish Church of Our Lady of Perpetual Help and St Eugene (La Cruz de Carrasco)
- Mater Admirabilis Parish Church
- Parish Church of St John Bosco
- Parish Church of St Gemma Galgani

== Diocese of Canelones ==
The Roman Catholic Diocese of Canelones covers Canelones Department:

=== Canelones Deanery ===
- Cathedral of Our Lady of Guadalupe in Canelones
- St. John the Baptist Parish Church in Santa Lucía
- St. Michael Archangel Parish Church in Los Cerrillos
- St. Thérèse of Lisieux Parish Church in Juanicó

=== Piedras Deanery ===
- Isidore the Laborer Parish Church in Las Piedras
- St. Adolphus Parish Church in El Dorado
- Our Lady of the Miraculous Medal Parish Church in San Isidro
- St. Anthony of Padua Church in Pueblo Nuevo
- Our Lady of Peace Parish Church in La Paz
- St. Anthony Mary Claret Parish Church in Progreso
- St. Mary of the Visitation Monastery in Progreso

=== Central Deanery ===
- St. Raymond Nonnatus Parish Church in San Ramón
- St. Hyacinth Parish Church in San Jacinto
- St. Anthony of Padua Parish Church in San Antonio
- St. John the Baptist Parish Church in San Bautista
- St. Rose of Lima Parish Church in Santa Rosa
- Parish Church of the Holy Family in Sauce
- Parish Church of the Most Holy Savior in Tala

=== Pando Deanery ===
- Parish Church of Our Lady of Mt. Carmel in Migues
- Parish Church of St. Joseph the Worker in Montes
- Parish Church of St. Thomas Aquinas in Soca
- Soca Chapel in Soca
- Parish Church of St. Francis of Assisi in Suárez
- St. Rose of Lima Parish Church in Empalme Olmos
- Parish Church of the Immaculate Conception in Pando
- Parish Church of Our Lady of Perpetual Help in Barros Blancos
- Parish Church of Our Lady of Mt. Carmel in Toledo

=== Deanery of the Beaches ===
- Parish Church of the Blessed Luigi Orione in La Floresta
- Shrine of the Virgin of the Flowers in Estación Floresta (Roman Catholic)
- Church of the Sacred Heart in Atlántida
- Parish Church of Christ the Worker and Our Lady of Lourdes in Estación Atlántida
- Parish Church of St. Rose of Lima in El Pinar
- Parish Church of St. Elizabeth of Hungary in Salinas
- Parish Church of St. Mary of the Angels in San José de Carrasco
- Parish Church of St. Joseph the Worker in Paso Carrasco
- Parish Church of St. Francis of Assisi in Colonia Nicolich
- Parish Church of Our Lady of the Foundation in Solymar
- Parish Church of the Most Holy Trinity in Shangrilá

== Diocese of Florida ==
The Roman Catholic Diocese of Florida covers Florida Department and Durazno Department:

=== Florida Department ===
- Cathedral Sanctuary of Our Lady of the Thirty-Three in Florida
- St. Joseph Parish Church in Florida
- St. Thérèse of Lisieux Parish Church in Florida
- St. Conus Chapel in Florida, which is also a pilgrimage sanctuary
- St. Paul Parish Church in Mendoza Grande
- Our Lady of the Pillar Parish Church in Sarandí Grande
- Immaculate Conception Parish Church in 25 de Mayo
- Parish Church of the Saints Cosmas and Damian in 25 de Agosto
- St. Thérèse of Lisieux Parish Church in Chamizo
- Most Pure Heart of Mary Parish Church in Fray Marcos
- Parish Church of Our Lady of Mt. Carmel in Capilla del Sauce
- Parish Church of Mary Help of Christians in Casupá
- Exaltation of the Cross Chapel in La Cruz

=== Durazno Department ===
- St. Peter Parish Church in Durazno
- Parish Church of Our Lady of Mt. Carmel in Durazno
- St. Anthony of Padua Parish Church in Sarandí del Yí
- Parish Church of the Sacred Heart in La Paloma
- Parish Church of Our Lady of Mt. Carmel in Villa del Carmen
- Parish Church of the Sacred Heart in Carlos Reyles

== Diocese of Maldonado and Punta del Este ==
The Roman Catholic Diocese of Maldonado-Punta del Este covers almost all of the Maldonado Department and also part of Rocha Department.

=== Maldonado Department ===
- Cathedral of St. Ferdinand in Maldonado
- Parish Church of Our Lady of the Remedies in Maldonado Nuevo
- Parish Church of Our Lady of the Thirty-Three in Maldonado
- Parish Church of St. Charles Borromeo in San Carlos
- Parish Church of St. Pius X in San Carlos
- Parish Church of Our Lady of the Rosary at La Barra
- Parish Church of Our Lady of Sorrows in Pan de Azúcar
- Parish Church of the Immaculate Conception and St. John Vianney in Piriápolis
- Parish Church of the Holy Family at Gregorio Aznárez
- Parish Church of Our Lady of Candelaria in Punta del Este
- Fatima Chapel in Punta del Este
- St. Raphael Chapel in Punta del Este
- Our Lady of Mercy Chapel in Garzón

=== Rocha Department (seaside) ===
- Parish Church of Our Lady of Remedies in Rocha
- Parish Church of Our Lady of Fatima in Rocha
- Parish Church of Our Lady of the Pigeon in La Paloma
- Parish Church of Mary Help of Christians and St. Vincent Martyr in Castillos
- Parish Church of the Assumption of the Most Holy Virgin Mary in Chuy

== Diocese of Melo ==
The Roman Catholic Diocese of Melo covers Cerro Largo Department and Treinta y Tres Department:

=== Cerro Largo Department ===
- Cathedral of Our Lady of the Pillar and St. Raphael in Melo
- Parish Church of Our Lady of Mt. Carmel in Melo
- St. Joseph the Worker Parish Church in Melo
- Parish Church of St. Dominic Savio and St. Charles Borromeo in Melo
- Jesus Good Shepherd Parish Church in Melo
- St. John the Baptist Parish Church in Río Branco
- Most Holy Redeemer Parish Church in Fraile Muerto
- Christ the King Parish Church in Aceguá
- St. Joseph Parish Church in Tupambaé

=== Treinta y Tres Department ===
- St. Joseph the Worker Parish Church in Treinta y Tres
- Parish Church of Our Lady of the Thirty-Three in Treinta y Tres
- Parish Church of the Holy Savior in Treinta y Tres
- Mary Help of Christians Parish Church in General Enrique Martínez
- St. Clare of Assisi Parish Church in Santa Clara de Olimar
- Holy Sacrament Parish Church in Vergara
- Sacred Heart of Jesus Parish Church in Cerro Chato

== Diocese of Mercedes ==
The Roman Catholic Diocese of Mercedes covers Soriano Department and Colonia Department:

=== Soriano Department ===
- Cathedral of Our Lady of Mercy in Mercedes
- Sacred Heart of Jesus Parish Church in Mercedes
- St. John the Baptist Parish Church in Mercedes
- St. Pius X Parish Church in Mercedes
- Parish Church of Our Lady of Luján and St. Elizabeth in Cardona
- Our Lady of Sorrows Parish Church in Dolores
- St. Dominic Soriano Chapel in Villa Soriano
- Immaculate Conception Parish Church in Palmitas
- St. Joseph the Worker Parish Church in José Enrique Rodó

=== Colonia Department ===
- Basilica of the Holy Sacrament in Colonia del Sacramento
- St. Joseph the Worker and St. John Bosco in Juan Lacaze
- Our Lady of Mt. Carmel Parish Church in Carmelo
- Our Lady of Pompei Church in Carmelo
- Most Holy Trinity Parish Church in Nueva Helvecia
- Our Lady of Schoenstatt Chapel in Nueva Helvecia, which is also a pilgrimage sanctuary
- Our Lady of Fatima Chapel in Colonia Valdense
- Holy Cross Chapel in La Paz
- Our Lady of Remedies Parish Church in Nueva Palmira
- St. Joseph and St. Michael Parish Church in Ombúes de Lavalle
- Our Lady of the Rosary Parish Church in Rosario
- St. Joseph the Worker Parish Church in Tarariras

== Diocese of Minas ==
The Roman Catholic Diocese of Minas covers all the Lavalleja Department and also small parts of Rocha Department and Maldonado Department.

=== Lavalleja Department ===
- Cathedral of the Immaculate Conception in Minas
- St. Joseph Parish Church in Minas
- St. Thérèse of Lisieux Parish Church in Minas
- Our Lady of Fatima Parish Church in Minas
- Our Lady of Verdun National Sanctuary in Minas
- St. Nicholas of Bari Parish Church in José Batlle y Ordóñez/Nico Pérez
- St. Charles Borromeo Parish Church in José Pedro Varela
- Our Lady of Pompei Parish Church in Mariscala
- Our Lady of Mt. Carmel Parish Church in Solís de Mataojo

=== Rocha Department (North) ===
- St. Francis of Assisi Parish Church in Lascano

=== Maldonado Department (North) ===
- Parish Church of St. Anthony of Padua and Our Lady of the Valley of Aiguá in Aiguá

== Diocese of Salto ==
The Roman Catholic Diocese of Salto covers Artigas Department, Salto Department, Paysandú Department, and Río Negro Department:

=== Artigas Department ===
- St. Eugene of the Cuareim Parish Church in Artigas
- St. Rose of Lima of the Cuareim Parish Church in Bella Unión

=== Paysandú Department ===
- Parish Church of Our Lady of the Rosary and St. Benedict of Palermo in Paysandú
- St. Raymond and St. John Bosco Parish Church in Paysandú
- Sacred Heart of Jesus Parish Church in Paysandú
- St. Joseph the Worker Parish Church in Paysandú
- Immaculate Conception Parish Church in Tambores
- St. Thérèse of Lisieux Parish Church in Quebracho
- Mary Help of Christians Parish Church in Guichón

=== Río Negro Department ===
- Our Lady of the Pillar Parish Church in Fray Bentos
- Sacred Heart of Jesus Parish Church in Young

=== Salto Department ===
- Cathedral Basilica of St. John the Baptist in Salto
- Holy Cross Parish Church in Salto
- Sacred Heart of Jesus Parish Church in Salto
- Parish Church of Our Lady of Mt. Carmel in Salto
- St. Joseph Parish Church in Pueblo Lavalleja

== Diocese of San José de Mayo ==
The Roman Catholic Diocese of San José de Mayo covers San José Department and Flores Department:

=== San José Department ===
- Cathedral Basilica and National Sanctuary of St. Joseph in San José de Mayo
- Our Lady of the Orchard Chapel in San José de Mayo
- Our Lady of the Rosary of Pompei Parish Church in San José de Mayo
- Our Lady of Fatima Parish Church in San José de Mayo
- Christ the Redeemer Parish Church in Capurro
- Sacred Heart of Jesus Parish Church in Ecilda Paullier
- Parish Church of the Immaculate Conception and St. John Vianney in Estación González
- Parish Church of Our Lady of Sorrows and St. Isidore the Laborer in Libertad
- Parish Church of Our Lady of Lourdes and St. Raphael in Rafael Perazza
- St. Joseph the Worker Parish Church in Ciudad del Plata
- Delta del Tigre Parish Church in Ciudad del Plata
- Our Lady of the Rosary Parish Church in Rodríguez

=== Flores Department ===
- Most Holy Trinity Parish Church in Trinidad
- Our Lady of Luján Parish Church in Trinidad
- St. John the Baptist Chapel in Ismael Cortinas

== Diocese of Tacuarembó ==
The Roman Catholic Diocese of Tacuarembó covers Rivera Department and Tacuarembó Department:

=== Tacuarembó Department ===
- St. Fructuosus Cathedral in Tacuarembó
- Holy Cross Parish Church in Tacuarembó
- St. Joseph Parish Church in Tacuarembó
- Our Lady of Lourdes Parish Church in Tacuarembó
- St. Joseph Parish Church in Achar
- Parish Church of Our Lady of Mt. Carmel in San Gregorio de Polanco
- Parish Church of the Holy Sacrament and St. Thérèse of Lisieux in Las Toscas
- Our Lady of Itatí Parish Church in Ansina, which is also a pilgrimage sanctuary
- St. Elizabeth Parish Church in Paso de los Toros

=== Rivera Department ===
- Church of the Immaculate Conception in Rivera
- Parish Church of St. Dominic in Rivera
- Parish Church of the Sacred Heart in Rivera
- St. Peter Parish Church in Rivera
- Sacred Heart Parish Church in Tranqueras
- St. John Bosco Parish Church in Minas de Corrales
- Parish Church of Mary Help of Christians in Vichadero

== See also ==
- Roman Catholic Church in Uruguay
- List of cathedrals in Uruguay
