= List of cities in Uruguay =

The list of cities in Uruguay is a list of all populated centres of Uruguay that have received the status of "Ciudad" (City). There are several populated places that have not received this status, with a population below 10,000 but as big as that of many cities. The ranks shown are only among cities and not including their wider metropolitan areas.

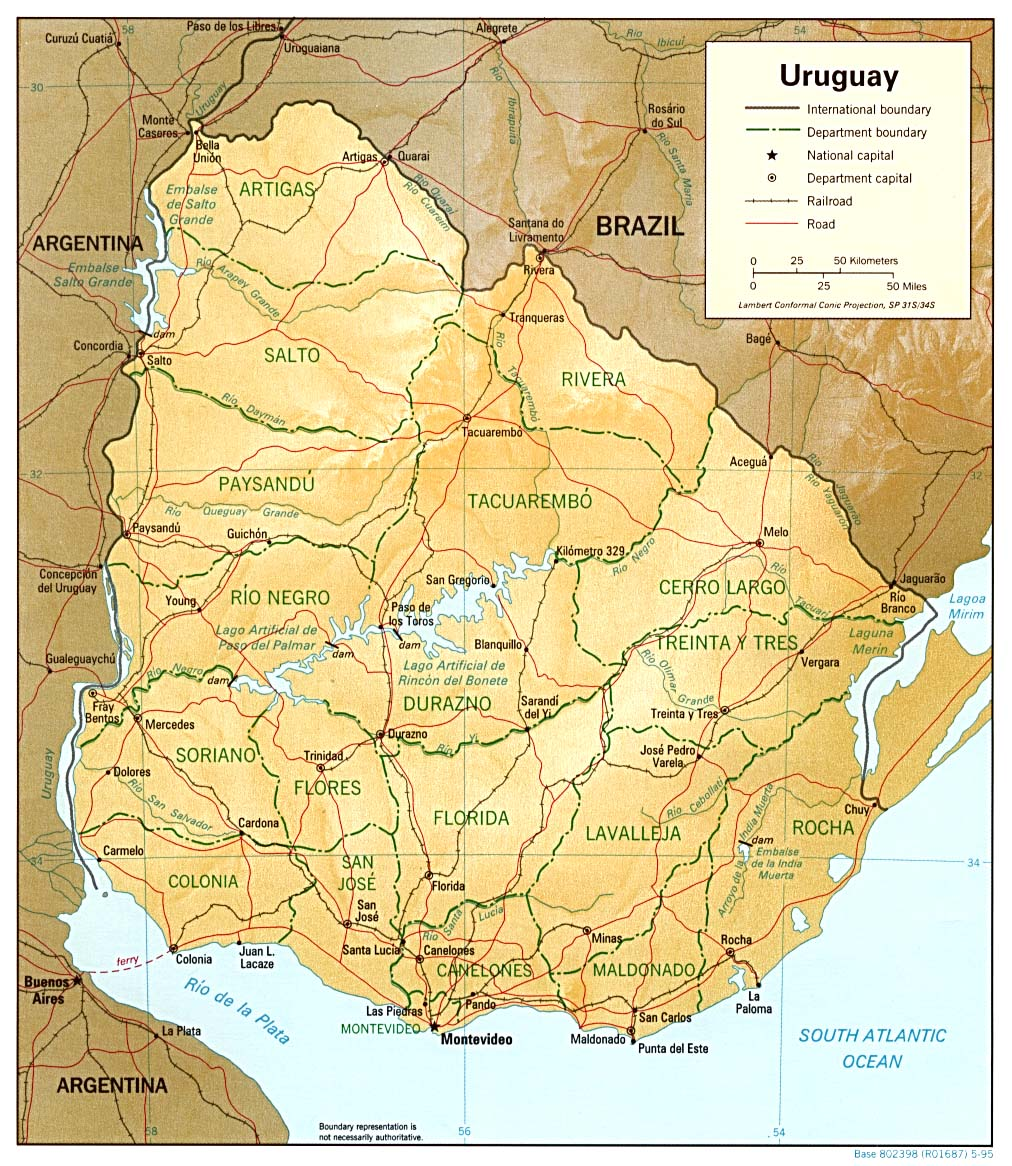
An enlargeable relief map of the Oriental Republic of Uruguay

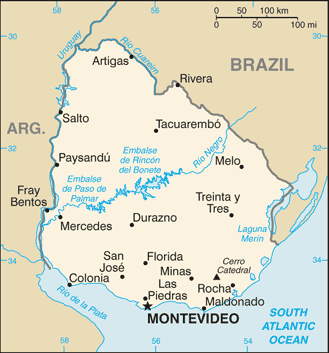
An enlargeable basic map of Uruguay

== List ==
The year given is not the year of foundation but that of the acquisition of "City" status. If this status was obtained on an unknown date before the Independence of Uruguay, the foundation year is given in parentheses, or the date it was declared a "Villa" (Town) followed by an asterisk*.

Rank	City	Year	Population 2004 Census	Population 2011 Census	Change	Department
1	Montevideo	(1724)	1,269,648	1,319,108	+3.90%	Montevideo
2	Salto	1863	99,072	104,028	+5.00%	Salto
3	Ciudad de la Costa	1994	83,399	95,176*	+14.12%	Canelones
4	Paysandú	1863	73,272	76,412	+4.29%	Paysandú
5	Las Piedras	1925	69,222	71,258	+2.94%	Canelones
6	Rivera	1912	64,426	64,465	+0.06%	Rivera
7	Maldonado	(1755)	54,603	62,590	+14.63%	Maldonado
8	Tacuarembó	1912	51,224	54,755	+6.89%	Tacuarembó
9	Melo	1895	50,578	51,830	+2.48%	Cerro Largo
10	Mercedes	1857	42,032	41,974	−0.14%	Soriano
11	Artigas	1915	41,687	40,658	−2.47%	Artigas
12	Minas	1888	37,925	38,446	+1.37%	Lavalleja
13	San José de Mayo	1856	36,339	36,743	+1.11%	San José
14	Durazno	1906	33,576	34,368	+2.36%	Durazno
15	Florida	1894	32,128	33,639	+4.70%	Florida Department
16	Barros Blancos	2006	13,553	31,650	+133.53%	Canelones
17	Ciudad del Plata	2006		31,145	NA	San José
18	San Carlos	1929	24,771	27,471	+10.90%	Maldonado
19	Colonia del Sacramento	1809*	21,714	26,213	+20.72%	Colonia
20	Pando	1920	24,004	25,947	+8.09%	Canelones
21	Treinta y Tres	1915	25,711	25,477	−0.91%	Treinta y Tres
22	Rocha	1894	25,538	25,422	−0.45%	Rocha
23	Fray Bentos	1900	23,122	22,406	−3.10%	Río Negro Department
24	Trinidad	1903	20,982	21,429	+2.13%	Flores
25	La Paz	1957	19,832	20,524	+3.49%	Canelones
26	Canelones	1916	19,631	19,865	+1.19%	Canelones
27	Carmelo	1920	16,866	18,041	+6.97%	Colonia
28	Dolores	1923	15,753	17,174	+9.02%	Soriano
29	Young	1963	15,759	16,756	+6.33%	Río Negro Department
30	Santa Lucía	1925	16,425	16,742	+1.93%	Canelones
31	Progreso	1981	15,775	16,244	+2.97%	Canelones
32	Paso de Carrasco	1973	15,028	15,908	+5.86%	Canelones
33	Río Branco	1953	13,456	14,604	+8.53%	Cerro Largo
34	Paso de los Toros	1953	13,231	12,985	−1.86%	Tacuarembó
35	Juan Lacaze	1953	13,196	12,816	−2.88%	Colonia
36	Bella Unión	1963	13,187	12,200	−7.48%	Artigas
37	Nueva Helvecia	1952	10,002	10,630	+6.28%	Colonia
38	Libertad	1963	9,196	10,166	+10.55%	San José
39	Rosario	1920	9,311	10,085	+8.31%	Colonia
40	Nueva Palmira	1953	9,230	9,857	+6.79%	Colonia
41	Chuy	1981	10,401	9,675	−6.98%	Rocha
42	Punta del Este	1957	7,298	9,277	+27.12%	Maldonado
43	Piriápolis	1960	7,899	8,830	+11.79%	Maldonado
44	Salinas	1982	6,574	8,626	+31.21%	Canelones
45	Parque del Plata	1969	5,900	7,896	+33.83%	Canelones
46	Lascano	1952	6,994	7,645	+9.31%	Rocha
47	Castillos	1952	7,649	7,541	−1.41%	Rocha
48	Tranqueras	1994	7,284	7,235	−0.67%	Rivera
49	Sarandí del Yí	1956	7,289	7,176	−1.55%	Durazno
50	San Ramón	1953	6,992	7,133	+2.02%	Canelones
51	Tarariras	1969	6,070	6,632	+9.26%	Colonia
52	Pan De Azúcar	1961	7,098	6,597	−7.06%	Maldonado
53	Sauce	1973	5,797	6,132	+5.78%	Canelones
54	Sarandí Grande	1956	6,362	6,130	−3.65%	Florida Department
55	Atlántida	1967	4,580	5,562	+21.44%	Canelones
56	José Pedro Varela	1967	5,332	5,118	−4.01%	Lavalleja
57	Tala	1960	4,939	5,089	+3.04%	Canelones
58	Guichón	1964	5,025	5,039	+0.28%	Paysandú
59	Cardona	1963	4,689	4,600	−1.90%	Soriano
60	San Jacinto	1976	3,909	4,510	+15.37%	Canelones
61	Toledo	1995	4,028	4,397	+9.16%	Canelones
62	Vergara	1994	3,985	3,810	−4.39%	Treinta y Tres
63	Santa Rosa	1972	3,660	3,727	+1.83%	Canelones
64	Florencio Sánchez	1995	3,526	3,716	+5.39%	Colonia
65	La Paloma	1982	3,202	3,495	+9.15%	Rocha
66	San Gregorio de Polanco	1994	3,673	3,415	−7.02%	Tacuarembó
67	Ombúes de Lavalle	1984	3,451	3,390	−1.77%	Colonia
68	Colonia Valdense	1982	3,087	3,235	+4.79%	Colonia
69	Rodríguez	1909	2,561	2,604	+1.68%	San José
70	Cerrillos	1971	2,080	2,508	+20.58%	Canelones
71	Aiguá	1956	2,676	2,465	−7.88%	Maldonado
72	Migues	1970	2,180	2,109	−3.26%	Canelones
73	San Bautista	1993	1,880	1,973	+4.95%	Canelones

* According to the INE, during the 2011 census, the population Paso de Carrasco and some barrios not belonging to the municipality of Ciudad de la Costa were counted as part of the city. This would bring its population to 112,447. However, Wikipedia takes the number 95,178 as the one reflecting the population of what is officially defined as "Ciudad de la Costa" and which coincides with the limits of the municipality of the same name.

Source: National Statistics Institute of Uruguay

== See also ==
- List of populated places in Uruguay
- Municipalities of Uruguay
