= Google Street View in South America =

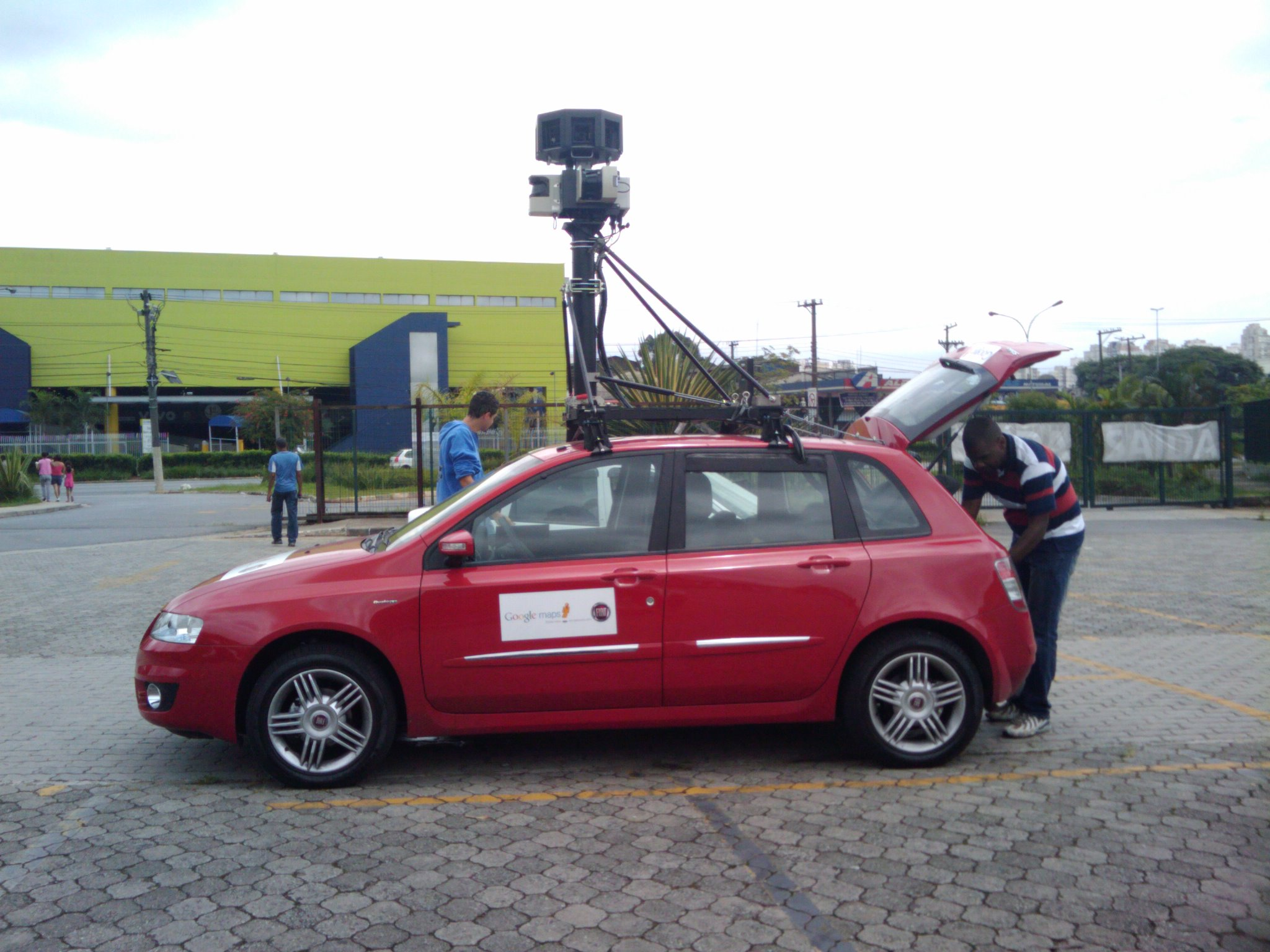
Google Street View Camera Car in Villa-Lobos State Park in São Paulo on January 7, 2010.

In South America, Google Street View is available in parts of Argentina, Bolivia, Brazil, Chile, Colombia, Ecuador, Paraguay, Peru and Uruguay. This article covers all of South America. For Central America and the Caribbean, see Google Street View in North America.

== Background ==
=== Brazil ===
In September 2010 the first cities from Brazil were added. The service started with 51 cities, most from São Paulo, Rio de Janeiro, Belo Horizonte and greater metropolitan areas. Historic cities such as Ouro Preto, Diamantina and Tiradentes were also included. Google is expecting to cover 90% of Brazilian streets in two years.

Google is also working on "Street View" for Brazil's rainforests. Pedal-powered trikes are being used to film the forests, and boats with 3-D cameras are being used to navigate the Amazon River.

In the initial release of Brazil's Street View, two dead bodies were found in the images. These were later removed.

Filming of Street View in Brazil began in April 2009.

Google, despite having a partnership with Fiat, used 30 Stilo cars because they feature advanced technology, making it easier to adapt Google's equipment.

=== Chile ===
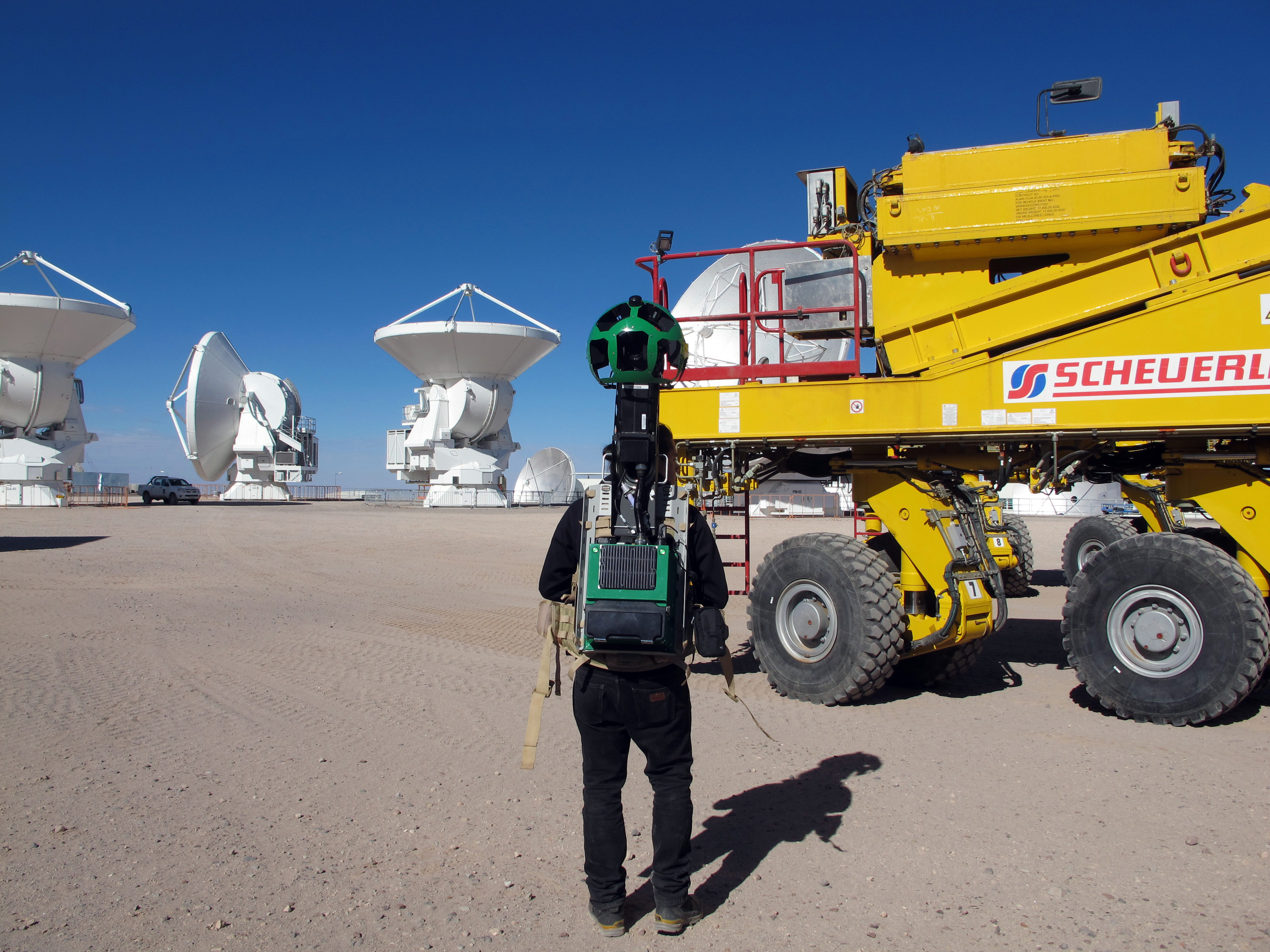
Google Street View at ALMA.

Filming of Street View in Chile began in January 2012. On September 25, 2012, parts of Chile were added including Santiago, Valparaíso, Viña del Mar and Concepción. Many more cities and roads were released during 2013. In March 2015 the country counts with mostly full coverage. The highest road in the world which is shown in Street View, is located at 19.744379396104346°S 68.7751577070292°W on 5,085 metres (16,683 ft) altitude, at the Paso Picavilque Mountain pass (Route A-97-B).

=== Colombia ===
On September 3, 2013, parts of Colombia were added. Some cities like Bogotá, Barranquilla, Montería, Cúcuta, Ibagué, Barrancabermeja, Caucasia, Valledupar, Yopal, Aguachica, Soledad, Villavicencio, Manizales, Zipaquirá, Floridablanca, Carmen de Bolívar, Fundación, Cartagena, Bucaramanga, Santa Marta, Santa Rosa de Cabal and more.

=== Ecuador ===
Some coverage became available on the Galapagos Islands on September 12, 2013, mostly from a boat. For the mainland Street view was released on November 12, 2015, in Quito, Guayaquil, Cuenca, Santo Domingo (limited), Machala, Durán, Portoviejo, Manta, Loja, Ambato, Esmeraldas, Quevedo, Riobamba, Milagro, Ibarra, La Libertad, Babahoyo, Sangolquí, Daule, Latacunga, Tulcán, Chone, Santa Rosa, Nueva Loja, Huaquillas, Santa Elena, Cayambe, Salinas, General Villamil Playas .

=== Paraguay ===
On November 23, 2025 Google Street View released coverage of Paraguay mainly in highways but also in cities like: Asunción.

=== Peru ===
On August 14, 2013, Google Street View became available for six cities: Lima, Arequipa, Trujillo, Chiclayo, Iquitos and Piura. Later 2013 some long road stretches became available.

=== Argentina ===
On September 25, 2013, Google announced the arrival of the service to Argentina. On October 2 took place the official presentation of the Trikes in Congressional Plaza, Buenos Aires; the service was expected to be available by the end of the year in Buenos Aires, Buenos Aires Province, Cordoba, Rosario, Santa Fe, Entre Ríos, Mendoza and La Plata. As of September 25, 2014, Argentina was added to Street View.

=== Bolivia ===
On November 28, 2014, Google started filming in Santa Cruz de la Sierra but street view will be also available in La Paz, Cochabamba, Sucre and El Alto. For security reasons, Google decided not reveal how many cars will take photos. Additionally, Bolivian media are not allowed to interview their drivers. Images did appear on street view some time in 2015.

=== Uruguay ===
On June 26, 2015, Google started to photograph the streets of Uruguay. The service became available online on December 2, 2015.

== Timeline of introductions ==
Date	Major locations added
September 2011	(Brazil) Curitiba, Londrina, Porto Alegre, Santana do Livramento, Paranaguá, São Joaquim
October 2011	(Brazil) Brasília
May 2012	(Brazil) Manaus
September 2012	Santiago, Valparaíso, Viña del Mar, Concepción, in Chile
March 2013	Aconcagua Summit, Camp Colera, Camp 1 and 2, Plaza Argentina, Casa de Piedra, Pampa de Leñas, in Argentina
December 2013	Google Art project museums including: Inhotim, Iberê Camargo Foundation, Moreira Salles Institute, Museu da Imagem e do Som, in Brazil
March 2015	Water views of Amazon basin including Aripuanã and Madeira rivers, trails and landmarks in the Amazon rainforest. Fernando de Noronha, Rocas Atoll in Brazil
October 2015	(Brazil) Cemitério São João Batista
November 2015	La Paz, Santa Cruz de la Sierra, El Alto, Greater Cochabamba, Montero, Warnes, La Guardia*, Viacha, Villamontes*, Camiri*, Punata*, Cotoca, Mineros*, El Torno*, Portachuelo*, San José de Chiquitos*, Sipe Sipe*, Patacamaya*, Vallegrande, Laja, Irpa Irpa, Cliza, Mizque, Aiquile and more locations in Bolivia; Quito, Guayaquil, Cuenca, Santo Domingo*, Machala, Durán, Portoviejo, Manta, Loja, Ambato, Esmeraldas, Quevedo, Riobamba, Milagro, Ibarra, La Libertad, Babahoyo, Sangolquí, Daule, Latacunga, Tulcán, Chone, Pasaje*, Santa Rosa, Nueva Loja, Huaquillas, El Carmen*, Montecristi, Samborondón*, Puerto Francisco de Orellana*, Jipijapa*, Santa Elena, Otavalo*, Cayambe, Buena Fe*, Velasco Ibarra*, La Troncal*, El Triunfo*, Salinas, General Villamil Playas, Azogues, Puyo, Vinces*, La Concordia*, Quinindé*, Balzar*, Naranjito, Guaranda, La Maná*, San Lorenzo*, Catamayo, El Guabo*, Pedernales*, Atuntaqui*, Bahía de Caráquez*, Pedro Carbo* and more locations in Ecuador; Montevideo Metropolitan Cathedral, Solís Theatre, Auditorio Nacional Adela Reta in Montevideo, in Uruguay
December 2015	Montevideo, Salto, Ciudad de la Costa*, Paysandú, Las Piedras, Rivera, Maldonado, Tacuarembó, Melo, Mercedes, Artigas, Minas, San José de Mayo, Durazno, Barros Blancos, Ciudad del Plata*, San Carlos*, Colonia del Sacramento, Pando*, Treinta y Tres, Rocha, Fray Bentos, Trinidad, La Paz*, Canelones, Carmelo*, Santa Lucía, Progreso*, Paso de Carrasco, Río Branco, Paso de los Toros, Bella Unión, Libertad, Rosario*, Nueva Palmira, Chuy, Punta del Este, Piriápolis*, Salinas, Parque del Plata, Castillos, Sarandí del Yí*, San Ramón, Tarariras*, Pan de Azúcar*, Sauce, Sarandí Grande*, Atlántida, Cardona*, San Jacinto*, Toledo*, Vergara*, Santa Rosa*, Florencio Sánchez*, La Paloma, San Gregorio de Polanco, Colonia Valdense*, Cerrillos, and Migues* in Uruguay; Machu Picchu, Aguas Calientes, Poroy–Machu Picchu railway and more locations in Peru; Puerto Williams, and expanded coverage of existing locations in Chile including, Puerto Aisén, Pucón, Hualqui, Quinta de Tilcoco, and Monte Patria. In addition to coverage of several beaches in the south of the country. such as Los Molinos Beach in Valdivia, Aulén Beach in Chiloé, Grande Beach in Niebla and other beaches in Chile
May 2016	National parks in Argentina
June 2016	(Colombia) Several libraries throughout the country include the El Tintal library, the Gabriel García Márquez library and the Virgilio Barco library in Bogotá, the José Eustasio Rivera library in Neiva and the San Javier library in Medellín
July 2016	(Colombia) San Agustín Archaeological Park, Alto de los Ídolos Archaeological Park & Alto De Las Piedras Archaeological Park
August 2016	Landmarks in Bolivia including Uyuni train cemetery, El Alto International Airport and 43 others
July 2017	(Argentina) Barrios Alberti, Barrio San Cayetano, Barrio Los Pinos in Buenos Aires
September 2017	(Brazil) Serra dos Órgãos National Park, Sierra de Bocaina National Park, Lençóis Maranhenses National Park, Iguazú National Park, Ilha do Mel State Park & Jurubatiba Sandbank National Park
February 2018	(Chile) Gray Glacier in Torres del Paine National Park
May 2019	(Chile) Moneda Palace
June 2019	(Colombia) Moravia Commune in Medellín (Argentina) Views with the Google Trekker of the Villa Inflammable, Villa La Carbonilla and Rodrigo Bueno neighborhoods in Buenos Aires, plus updates throughout the country
July 2019	(Colombia) Tourist sites in Bogotá, including Parque Mirador de los Nevados, the Quebrada Las Delicias and the San Francisco trail – Vicachá
November 2025	(Paraguay) Asunción, San Lorenzo, Areguá, Capiatá, Ayolas, Caaguazú, Caacupé, Encarnación, General Oviedo, Salto del Guairá, Curuguaty, Katueté, Ciudad del Este, Pilar, San Juan Bautista, Villa Florida, Coronel Bogado, Carmen del Paraná, Concepción, Villarrica, Filadelfia, Puerto Valle-Mi, Caazapá, María Auxiliadora, San Juan Nepomuceno, Caraguatay

* Limited coverage.

== Competing products ==
- Argentina: Two Argentine street view services have existed. Mapplo was claimed to be the first street view in Latin America. Mapplo closed in 2012. Fotocalle, another Argentine project, is claimed to be the first street view in the world that provides HD pictures. Fotocalle is not working as of November 2020.
- Chile: Chilean company Publiguías released a service similar to Google's Street View in December 2010 called "Street Diving". It offers views of Providencia and Santiago communes, with plans to expand it to other communes in the future. XYGO launched a street view service in April 2011 partially covering seven cities.
