= Fraccionamiento sobre Ruta 74 =

- Populated fragment
- Location in Uruguay
- Coordinates: 34°43′0″S 56°3′5″W
- Country: Uruguay
- Department: Canelones Department

Population (2011)
  - Total: 1,513
- Time zone: UTC -3
- Postal code: 15500
- Dial plan: +598 2297 XXXX

Fraccionamiento sobre Ruta 74 is a populated area composed of two fragments in the Canelones Department of southern Uruguay.

== Geography ==
=== Location ===
One fragment is located on the south side of Route 6, along Route 74, and lies about 2 kilometres (1.2 mi) northwest of the town of Joaquín Suárez, and the other lies also on Route 74, just southeast of the town. They are all parts of the wider metropolitan area of Montevideo.

=== Coordinates of fragments ===
- Northwest fragment: 34°43′0″S 56°3′5″W
- Southeast fragment: 34°14′19″S 56°1′33″W

== Population ==
In 2011 this area had a population of 1,513.

Year	Population
1985	828
1996	1,169
2004	1,414
2011	1,513

Source: Instituto Nacional de Estadística de Uruguay
