= Seis Hermanos =

- Hamlet
- Location in Uruguay
- Coordinates: 34°43′0″S 56°4′0″W
- Country: Uruguay
- Department: Canelones Department

Population (2011)
  - Total: 622
- Time zone: UTC -3
- Postal code: 91100
- Dial plan: +598 2 (+7 digits)

Seis Hermanos is a hamlet (caserío) in the Canelones Department of southern Uruguay.

== Geography ==
=== Location ===
It is located on Route 6, about 0.6 kilometres (0.37 mi) southwest of its intersection with Route 7 and Route 74. It is 8 kilometres (5.0 mi) south of the city of Sauce and 4 kilometres (2.5 mi) northeast of the town of Toledo.

== Population ==
In 2011 Seis Hermanos had a population of 622.

Year	Population
1963	174
1975	245
1985	347
1996	462
2004	553
2011	622

Source: Instituto Nacional de Estadística de Uruguay
