= Montevideo metropolitan area =

Comprises the city of Montevideo and several towns

Montevideo metropolitan area Área metropolitana de Montevideo
- Metropolitan area
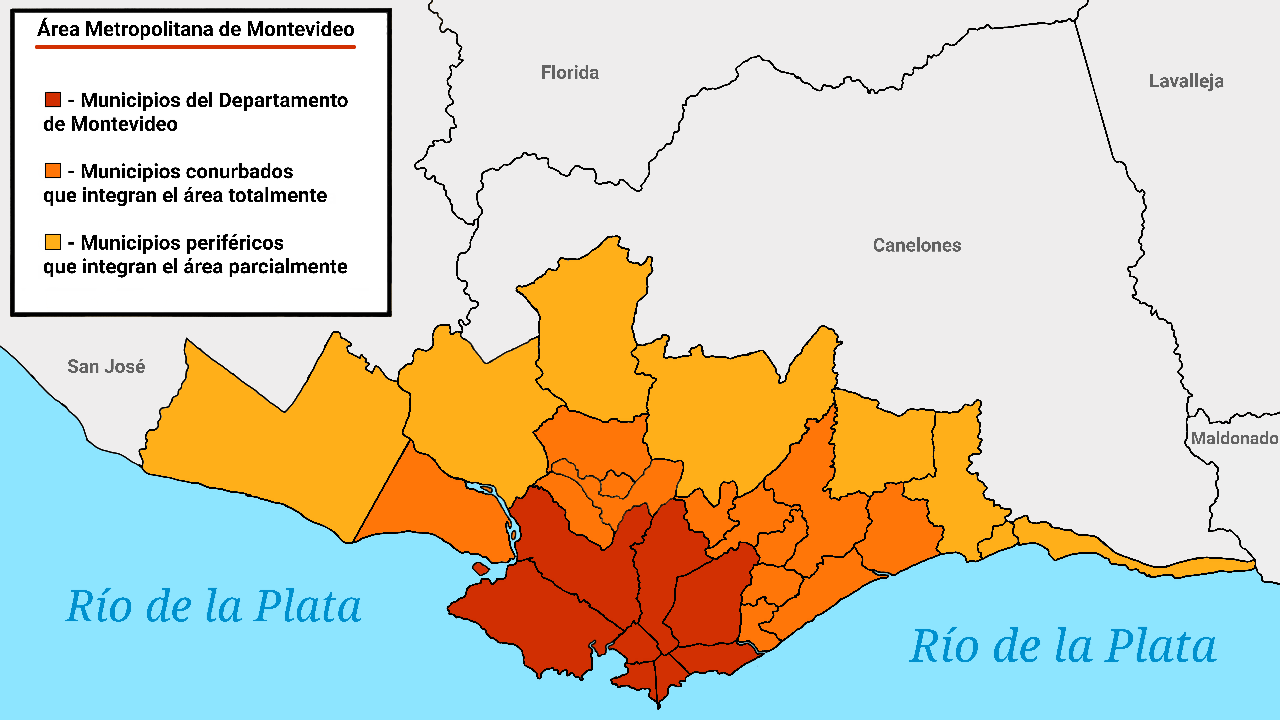
- Madrid and surroundings
- Country: Uruguay
- Department(s): Montevideo; Canelones; San José
- Largest city: Montevideo (1,319,108)

Area
  - Metro: 1,641 km^{2} (634 sq mi)

Population
  - Metro: 1,947,604
  - Metro density: 1,186/km^{2} (3,070/sq mi)

The Montevideo metropolitan area (Spanish: Área metropolitana de Montevideo) refers to the conurbation around Montevideo, encompassing its surrounding suburbs and satellite cities in the departments of Montevideo, Canelones and San José.

According to the 2011 Census of the National Statistics Institute, the population of the department of Montevideo was 1,319,108 inhabitants, but considering its metropolitan area, it would reach 1,764,745 inhabitants, which corresponds to 54% of the national total.

Greater Montevideo is the most important region of the country in economic and sociocultural terms, having the highest population density. It produces 65% of the national GDP, 60% of the manufacturing industry and 80% of the services.

Since the 1990s, telephone numbers in the area have had the same prefix, 2. Previously, this only belonged to the capital city, while the rest of the surrounding towns governed long-distance call rates.

== Cities and towns ==
=== Canelones Department ===
- Atlántida
- Barros Blancos
- Bello Horizonte
- Canelones
- Cerrillos
- City Golf
- Ciudad de la Costa
- Colonia Nicolich
- Costa Azul
- Empalme Olmos
- Estación Atlántida
- Estación La Floresta
- Estanque de Pando
- Jardines de Pando
- Joaquín Suárez
- La Floresta
- La Paz
- Las Piedras
- Las Toscas
- Neptunia
- Pando
- Parque del Plata
- Paso de Carrasco
- Progreso
- Salinas
- Sauce
- Toledo
- Totoral del Sauce
- Villa Aeroparque
- Villa Crespo y San Andrés
- 18 de Mayo

=== Montevideo Department ===
- Montevideo

=== San José Department ===
- Ciudad del Plata
- Playa Pascual

== See also ==
- List of South American metropolitan areas by population
