= Villa El Tato =

- Urban fragment
- Location in Uruguay, Ciudad Gral Liber Seregni desde 2017
- Coordinates: 34°46′30″S 55°58′25″W
- Country: Uruguay
- Department: Canelones Department

Population (2011)
  - Total: 615
- Time zone: UTC -3
- Postal code: 15500
- Dial plan: +598 2 (+7 digits)

Villa El Tato is a subdivision founded in 1900 in the department of Canelones, in southern Uruguay. It is part of the metropolitan area of Montevideo.

== Geography ==
=== Location ===
It is one of several urban fragments that are situated among the city of Pando to the northeast, Joaquín Suárez to the northwest, Colonia Nicolich and the Carrasco International Airport to the southwest and Ciudad de la Costa to the south and southeast. It is located on the street Camino de los Horneros, which is the first parallel east of Route 101.

== Population ==
In 2011, Villa El Tato had a population of 615.

Year	Population
1985	198
1996	406
2004	508
2011	615

Source: Instituto Nacional de Estadística de Uruguay
