= Fraccionamiento Camino del Andaluz y Ruta 84 =

Casarino
- Populated fragment
- Location within Uruguay
- Coordinates: 34°45′30″S 56°4′24″W
- Country: Uruguay
- Department: Canelones Department
- Founded: 1889

Population (2023)
  - Total: 9,560
- Time zone: UTC -3
- Postal code: 91200
- Dial plan: +598 2 (+7 digits)

Fraccionamiento Ruta 84, also called Casarino, is a populated area composed of several fragments on both sides of Route 84, southwest of the town of Joaquín Suárez and east of Toledo in the Canelones Department, Uruguay. It belongs to Del Andaluz municipality and is part of the wider Montevideo metropolitan area.

== Population ==
In 2023 this area had a population of 9,560.

Year	Population
1985	5,635
1996	7,192
2004	7,145
2011	9,295
2023	9,560

Source: Instituto Nacional de Estadística de Uruguay
