= Villa Porvenir =

- Caserio
- Location within Uruguay
- Coordinates: 34°44′32″S 56°05′54″W
- Country: Uruguay
- Department: Canelones Department

Population (2011)
  - Total: 507
- Time zone: UTC -3
- Postal code: 91100
- Dial plan: +598 2 (+7 digits)

Villa Porvenir is a caserio (small village) in the Canelones Department of Uruguay.

== Geography ==
=== Location ===
It is located on the north side of Route 6 on its Km. 25.5 and on its intersection with Tomas Berreta street. It lies directly northeast of Toledo and directly southwest of Villa San José and Villa San Felipe.

== Population ==
In 2011 Villa Porvenir had a population of 507.

| Year | Population |
|---|---|
| 1985 | 365 |
| 1996 | 260 |
| 2004 | 364 |
| 2011 | 507 |

Source: Instituto Nacional de Estadística de Uruguay
