= Olmos, Uruguay =

Olmos
- Populated centre
- Location in Uruguay
- Coordinates: 34°41′55″S 55°55′47″W
- Country: Uruguay
- Department: Canelones Department

Population (2011)
  - Total: 662
- Time zone: UTC -3
- Postal code: 91002
- Dial plan: +598 2 (+7 digits)

Olmos is a populated centre in the Canelones Department of southern Uruguay.

== Geography ==
=== Location ===
It is located about 0.8 kilometres (0.50 mi) north of km.35 of Route 8, 3 kilometres (1.9 mi) west of Empalme Olmos and about 3.5 kilometres (2.2 mi) northeast of the city of Pando.

== Population ==
In 2011 Olmos had a population of 662.

Year	Population
1963	257
1975	520
1985	561
1996	598
2004	493
2011	662

Source: Instituto Nacional de Estadística de Uruguay
