= Barrio La Lucha =

- Barrio of La Paz
- Location in Uruguay
- Coordinates: 34°45′0″S 56°15′0″W
- Country: Uruguay
- Department: Canelones Department

Population (2011)
  - Total: 492
- Time zone: UTC -3
- Postal code: 90100
- Dial plan: +598 2 (+7 digits)

Barrio La Lucha is a barrio of La Paz in the Canelones Department of southern Uruguay.

== Geography ==
=== Location ===
The barrio is located on the west side of the city, just north of Barrio Cópola.

== Population ==
In 2011 Barrio La Lucha had a population of 492.

Year	Population
1963	91
1975	268
1985	321
1996	400
2004	537
2011	492

Source: Instituto Nacional de Estadística de Uruguay
