= Totoral del Sauce =

- Village
- Location in Uruguay
- Coordinates: 34°40′0″S 56°0′0″W
- Country: Uruguay
- Department: Canelones Department

Population (2011)
  - Total: 746
- Time zone: UTC -3
- Postal code: 90800
- Dial plan: +598 2 (+7 digits)

Totoral del Sauce is a village or populated centre in the Canelones Department of southern Uruguay.

== Geography ==
=== Location ===
It is located on Route 7, about 2 kilometres (1.2 mi) southwest of its intersection with Route 75 and 8 kilometres (5.0 mi) northeast of its intersection with Route 6 and Route 74. It is 8 kilometres (5.0 mi) northwest of the city of Pando.

== Population ==
In 2011 Totoral del Sauce had a population of 746.

Year	Population
1963	419
1975	763
1985	559
1996	623
2004	745
2011	746

Source: Instituto Nacional de Estadística de Uruguay
