= Costa y Guillamón =

- Barrio of La Paz
- Location in Uruguay
- Coordinates: 34°45′37″S 56°14′18″W
- Country: Uruguay
- Department: Canelones Department

Population (2011)
  - Total: 550
- Time zone: UTC -3
- Postal code: 90100
- Dial plan: +598 2 (+7 digits)

Costa y Guillamón is a barrio of La Paz in the Canelones Department of southern Uruguay.

== Geography ==
=== Location ===
It is located at the west side of the city, on the south edge of the lake Canteras de La Paz.

== Population ==
In 2011 Costa y Guillamón had a population of 530.

Year	Population
1963	272
1975	549
1985	481
1996	562
2004	566
2011	550

Source: Instituto Nacional de Estadística de Uruguay
