= Villa Crespo y San Andrés =

- Town
- Location in Uruguay
- Coordinates: 34°44′0″S 56°6′0″W
- Country: Uruguay
- Department: Canelones Department

Population (2011)
  - Total: 9,813
- Time zone: UTC -3
- Postal code: 91100
- Dial plan: +598 2 (+7 digits)

Villa Crespo y San Andrés is a small town or populated centre in the Canelones Department of southern Uruguay. Together with its neighbouring Toledo, they form a population centre of about 13,800. They are both part of the wider metropolitan area of Montevideo.

== Geography ==
The town is located on Km. 22 of Route 6 and on Route 33, bordering Toledo to the east.

== Population ==
In 2011 Villa Crespo y San Andrés had a population of 9,813.

Year	Population
1975	4,786
1985	6,492
1996	8,107
2004	8,756
2011	9,813

Source: Instituto Nacional de Estadística de Uruguay
