= Castellanos, Uruguay =

Castellanos
- Populated centre
- Location in Uruguay
- Coordinates: 34°22′40″S 55°57′25″W
- Country: Uruguay
- Department: Canelones Department

Population (2004)
  - Total: 520
- Time zone: UTC -3
- Postal code: 90603
- Dial plan: +598 4313 (+4 digits)

Castellanos is a populated centre in the Canelones Department of southern Uruguay.

== Geography ==
=== Location ===
It is located on the intersection of Route 6 with Route 65, about 9 kilometres (5.6 mi) south of San Ramón.

== Population ==
In 2011 Castellanos had a population of 520.

Year	Population
1963	300
1975	418
1985	447
1996	509
2004	579
2011	520

Source: Instituto Nacional de Estadística de Uruguay
