= Villa Paz S.A. =

- Urban fragment
- Location within Uruguay
- Coordinates: 34°44′58″S 56°14′00″W
- Country: Uruguay
- Department: Canelones Department

Population (2011)
  - Total: 542
- Time zone: UTC -3
- Postal code: 90100
- Dial plan: +598 2 (+7 digits)

Location of Villa Paz in Canelones Department

Villa Paz S.A. is an urban fragment adjoined to the city of La Paz in the Canelones Department, southern Uruguay.

== Geography ==
=== Location ===
It is located west at the west part of the city and north of the city centre. It is separated by a quarry to its east from the rest of the urban area and joined with it to the north and to the south by Manuel Tiscornia street.

== Population ==
According to the 2011 census, Villa Paz S.A. has a population of 542.

Year	Population
1963	281
1975	356
1985	384
1996	476
2004	499
2011	542

Source: Instituto Nacional de Estadística de Uruguay
