= Santa Rosa, Uruguay =

Santa Rosa
- City & Municipality
- Location in Uruguay
- Coordinates: 34°30′0″S 56°2′0″W
- Country: Uruguay
- Department: Canelones

Population (2011 Census)
  - Total: 3,727
- Time zone: UTC -3
- Postal code: 90500
- Dial plan: +598 4313 (+4 digits)

Santa Rosa is a small city in the Canelones Department of southern Uruguay.

Santa Rosa is also the name of the municipality to which the city belongs.

== Geography ==
=== Location ===
The city is located on Km. 51 of Route 6, only 1 kilometre (0.62 mi) northeast of its intersection with Route 11 and 24 kilometres (15 mi) east of Canelones, the capital city of the department. Other nearby towns are: San Bautista 10.5 kilometres (6.5 mi) to the northeast, San Antonio 8 kilometres (5.0 mi) to the northwest, San Jacinto 18.5 kilometres (11.5 mi) to the east and Sauce 18 kilometres (11 mi) to the south.

== History ==
It was declared a "Pueblo" (village) by Decree of 19 August 1879. On 15 May 1925 its status was elevated to "Villa" (town) by the Act of Ley Nº 7.837, and then on 29 August 1972 to "Ciudad" (city) by the Act of Ley Nº 14.081.

== Population ==
According to the 2011 census, Santa Rosa had a population of 3,727. In 2010, the Intendencia de Canelones had estimated a population of 7,749 for the municipality during the elections.

Location map of the Municipality of Santa Rosa

Year	Population
1908	4,881
1963	2,440
1975	2,726
1985	2,808
1996	3,263
2004	3,660
2011	3,727

Source: Instituto Nacional de Estadística de Uruguay

== Places of worship ==
- St. Rose of Lima Parish Church (Roman Catholic)
