= Jardines de Pando =

- Suburb of Pando
- Location in Uruguay
- Coordinates: 34°41′0″S 55°58′0″W
- Country: Uruguay
- Department: Canelones Department

Population (2011)
  - Total: 756
- Time zone: UTC -3
- Postal code: 91000
- Dial plan: +598 2 (+7 digits)

Jardines de Pando is a suburb of the city of Pando in the Canelones Department of southern Uruguay.

== Geography ==
=== Location ===
It is located on Route 72, about 5 kilometres (3.1 mi) north of the city, after the suburbs San Bernardo - Viejo Molino and Estanque de Pando.

== Population ==
In 2011 Jardines de Pando had a population of 756.

Year	Population
1985	419
1996	510
2004	673
2011	756

Source: Instituto Nacional de Estadística de Uruguay
