= Villa San José =

- Hamlet
- Location in Uruguay
- Coordinates: 34°43′0″S 56°4′27″W
- Country: Uruguay
- Department: Canelones Department

Population (2011)
  - Total: 1,419
- Time zone: UTC -3
- Postal code: 91100
- Dial plan: +598 2 (+7 digits)

Villa San José is a hamlet (caserío) in the Canelones Department of southern Uruguay.

== Location ==
It is located on Km. 26 of Route 6, about 1 kilometre (0.62 mi) southwest of its intersection with Route 74 and 2 kilometres (1.2 mi) northeast of Toledo.

== Population ==
In 2011 Villa San José had a population of 1,419.

Year	Population
1963	381
1975	823
1985	893
1996	1,229
2004	1,407
2011	1,419

Source: Instituto Nacional de Estadística de Uruguay
