= Santiago Merlo =

Uruguayan football player (born 1998)

Personal information
- Full name: Santiago Daniel Merlo Rosadilla
- Date of birth: 30 August 1998 (age 28)
- Place of birth: Empalme Olmos, Uruguay
- Height: 1.75 m (5 ft 9 in)
- Position: Defender

Youth career
- Nacional

Senior career*
Years	Team	Apps	(Gls)
2020–2021	Cerro Largo	7	(0)
2021	Villa Española	5	(0)
- * Club domestic league appearances and goals as of 1 January 2022

Santiago Daniel Merlo Rosadilla (born 30 August 1998) is a Uruguayan professional footballer who plays as a defender.

== Career ==
Merlo is a former youth academy player of Nacional. He was part of Nacional's 2018 U-20 Copa Libertadores winning squad. He joined Cerro Largo on a free transfer prior to the 2020 season. He made his professional debut for the club on 12 September 2020 in a 2–1 league win against Progreso.

In August 2021, Merlo joined Villa Española.

== Career statistics ==
=== Club ===
As of 22 May 2021

Appearances and goals by club, season and competition
Club	Season	League			Cup		Continental		Total	
Club	Season	Division	Apps	Goals	Apps	Goals	Apps	Goals	Apps	Goals
Cerro Largo	2020	Uruguayan Primera División	5	0	—		0	0	5	0
Cerro Largo	2021	Uruguayan Primera División	1	0	–		0	0	1	0
Career total			6	0	0	0	0	0	6	0

== Honours ==
Nacional U20

- U-20 Copa Libertadores: 2018
