= Estanque de Pando =

- Suburb of Pando
- Location in Uruguay
- Coordinates: 34°42′0″S 55°58′0″W
- Country: Uruguay
- Department: Canelones Department

Population (2011)
  - Total: 770
- Time zone: UTC -3
- Postal code: 91000
- Dial plan: +598 2 (+7 digits)

Estanque de Pando is a northern suburb of Pando in the Canelones Department of southern Uruguay.

== Geography ==
=== Location ===
It is located on Route 75, about 2 kilometres (1.2 mi) north of Pando. It lies between the suburbs San Bernardo - Viejo Molino and Jardines de Pando.

== Population ==
In 2011 Estanque de Pando had a population of 770.

Year	Population
1985	296
1996	365
2004	641
2011	770

Source: Instituto Nacional de Estadística de Uruguay
