= Capurro, Uruguay =

Capurro
- Populated centre
- Location in Uruguay
- Coordinates: 34°26′12″S 56°27′53″W
- Country: Uruguay
- Department: San José Department
- Elevation: 35 m (115 ft)

Population (2011)
  - Total: 771
- Time zone: UTC -3
- Postal code: 80004
- Dial plan: +598 4348 (+4 digits)

Capurro is a populated centre in San José Department of southern Uruguay.

== Geography ==
It is located between Routes 77 and 78, 7 kilometres (4.3 mi) west of Santa Lucía (of Canelones Department) and 26 kilometres (16 mi) southeast of the department capital San José de Mayo. Its nearest populated centre is 18 de Julio (Pueblo Nuevo), 2 kilometres (1.2 mi) to the east.

== Population ==
In 2011 Capurro had a population of 517.

Year	Population
1963	126
1975	123
1985	328
1996	390
2004	580
2011	517

Source: Instituto Nacional de Estadística de Uruguay

== Places of worship ==
- Christ the Redeemer Parish Church (Roman Catholic)
