= Villa Aeroparque =

- Town
- Location in Uruguay
- Coordinates: 34°47′30″S 55°59′40″W
- Country: Uruguay
- Department: Canelones Department

Population (2011)
  - Total: 4,307
- Time zone: UTC -3
- Postal code: 14000
- Dial plan: +598 2 (+7 digits)

Villa Aeroparque is a small town or urban fragment (fraccionamiento) in the Canelones Department of southern Uruguay.

== Geography ==
=== Location ===
The town is located on Route 101, 4.5 kilometres (2.8 mi) northeast of its intersection with the Ruta Interbalnearia and the Carrasco International Airport. It is part of the wider metropolitan area of Montevideo.

== Population ==
In 2011 Villa Aeroparque had a population of 4,307.

Year	Population
1975	865
1985	1,887
1996	3,414
2004	4,434
2011	4,307

Source: Instituto Nacional de Estadística de Uruguay
