= Fraile Muerto =

- Town
- Location in Uruguay
- Coordinates: 32°31′0″S 54°31′0″W
- Country: Uruguay
- Department: Cerro Largo Department
- Founded: 1908

Population (2011)
  - Total: 3,168
- Time zone: UTC -3
- Postal code: 37005
- Dial plan: +598 4688 (+4 digits)

Fraile Muerto is a town in the Cerro Largo Department of eastern Uruguay. Its name means "Dead Friar".

== Geography ==
=== Location ===
It is located on Route 7, around 38 kilometres (24 mi) west-southwest of Melo.

== History ==
It was founded on 3 January 1908. Its original name was "Fructuoso Mazziotta", known also as "Wenceslao Silveira". On 17 July 1918 it was renamed to "Fraile Muerto" and its status was elevated to "Pueblo" (village) by the Act of Ley Nº 6.195 and then raised to "Villa" (town) on 19 December 1957 by the Act of Ley Nº 12.478.

== Population ==
In 2011 Fraile Muerto had a population of 3,168.

Year	Population
1908	3,922
1963	2,576
1975	2,468
1985	2,903
1996	3,214
2004	3,229
2011	3,168

Source: Instituto Nacional de Estadística de Uruguay

== Places of worship ==
- Most Holy Redeemer Parish Church (Roman Catholic)
