= Barrio Cópola =

- Barrio of La Paz
- Location in Uruguay
- Coordinates: 34°45′0″S 56°15′0″W
- Country: Uruguay
- Department: Canelones Department

Population (2011)
  - Total: 826
- Time zone: UTC -3
- Postal code: 90100
- Dial plan: +598 2 (+7 digits)

Barrio Cópola is a barrio of La Paz in the Canelones Department of southern Uruguay.

== Geography ==
=== Location ===
The barrio is located 1 kilometre (0.62 mi) west of La Paz just across the lake known as Canteras de La Paz.

== Population ==
In 2011 Barrio Cópola had a population of 826.

Year	Population
1963	466
1975	620
1985	651
1996	799
2004	780
2011	826

Source: Instituto Nacional de Estadística de Uruguay
