= City Golf =

- Village, resort
- Location in Uruguay
- Country: Uruguay
- Department: Canelones Department

Population (2011)
  - Total: 1,104
- Time zone: UTC -3
- Postal code: 16000
- Dial plan: +598 437 (+5 digits)

City Golf is a village and resort in the Canelones Department of southern Uruguay.

== Location ==
It is located on the north side of Ruta Interbalnearia, between Atlántida and Estación Atlántida.

== Population ==
In 2011 City Golf had a population of 1,104.

Year	Population
1985	216
1996	616
2004	854
2011	1,104

Source: Instituto Nacional de Estadística de Uruguay
