= Estación La Floresta =

- Suburb of La Floresta
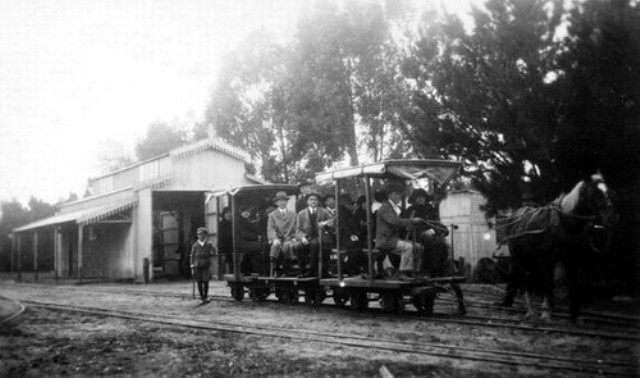
- Station of the Ferrocarril La Floresta

- Location in Uruguay
- Coordinates: 34°44′10″S 55°41′10″W
- Country: Uruguay
- Department: Canelones Department
- Established: 1909

Population (2011)
  - Total: 1,313
- Time zone: UTC -3
- Postal code: 16200
- Dial plan: +598 437 (+5 digits)

Estación La Floresta is a suburb of La Floresta in the Canelones Department of Uruguay.

== Location ==
It is located on the junction of Route 35 with Route 103, 1.2 kilometres (0.75 mi) north of the Ruta Interbalnearia, and bordering La Floresta to the south and to the west. The railroad track Montevideo - Punta del Este pass through this suburb.

== Population ==
In 2011 Estación La Floresta had a population of 1,313.

Year	Population
1963	780
1975	737
1985	907
1996	1,128
2004	1,222
2011	1,313

Source: Instituto Nacional de Estadística de Uruguay
