= Montes, Uruguay =

Montes
- Village
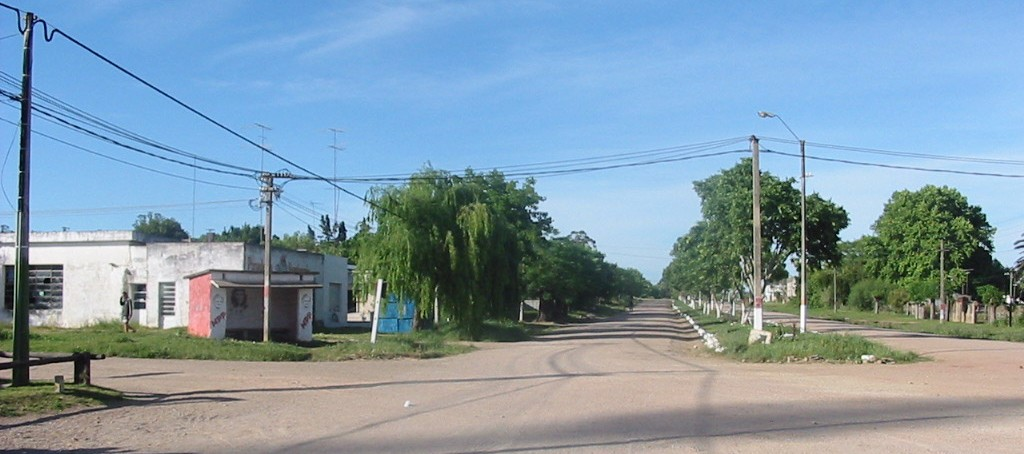
- Main avenue in Montes

- Location in Uruguay
- Coordinates: 34°29′34″S 55°33′41″W
- Country: Uruguay
- Department: Canelones Department
- Founded: 1891

Population (2011)
  - Total: 1,760
- Time zone: UTC -3
- Postal code: 91003
- Dial plan: +598 4317 (+4 digits)

Montes is a village in the east of Canelones Department of southern Uruguay.

Montes is also the name of the municipality to which the town belongs.

== Geography ==
=== Location ===
The village is located on Route 81, 6.5 kilometres (4.0 mi) east of Migues and about 40 kilometres (25 mi) southwest of the city of Minas (via Routes 8 and 81). The border with Lavalleja Department is the stream Arroyo Solís Grande, which flows by the east limits of the town.

== History ==
Montes was founded in November 1891. Its status was elevated to "Pueblo" (village) on 3 November 1952 by the Act of Ley Nº 11.878.

== Population ==
According to the 2011 census, Montes had a population of 1,760. In 2010, the Intendencia de Canelones had estimated a population of 1,968 for the municipality during the elections.

Location map of the Municipality of Montes

Year	Population
1963	1,843
1975	2,236
1985	2,156
1996	1,973
2004	1,713
2011	1,760

Source: Instituto Nacional de Estadística de Uruguay

== Places of worship ==
- Parish Church of St. Joseph the Worker (Roman Catholic)
