= Chamizo =

- Village
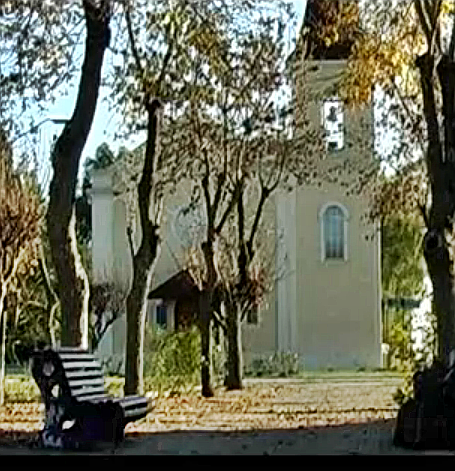
- Parish and square of Chamizo

- Location in Uruguay
- Coordinates: 34°15′0″S 55°56′0″W
- Country: Uruguay
- Department: Florida Department

Population (2011)
  - Total: 540
- Time zone: UTC -3
- Postal code: 90602
- Dial plan: +598 4319 (+4 digits)

Chamizo is a village in the Florida Department of central Uruguay.

== Geography ==
The village is located on the intersection of Route 6 with Route 94, about 87 kilometres (54 mi) from the centre of Montevideo.

== History ==
It was declared a "Pueblo" (village) on 21 November 1931 by the Act of Ley Nº 8.796.

== Population ==
In 2011 Chamizo had a population of 540.

Year	Population
1908	6.030
1963	474
1975	533
1985	447
1996	442
2004	587
2011	540

Source: Instituto Nacional de Estadística de Uruguay

== Places of worship ==
- St. Thérèse of Lisieux Parish Church (Roman Catholic)
