= Joaquín Suárez (town) =

- Village
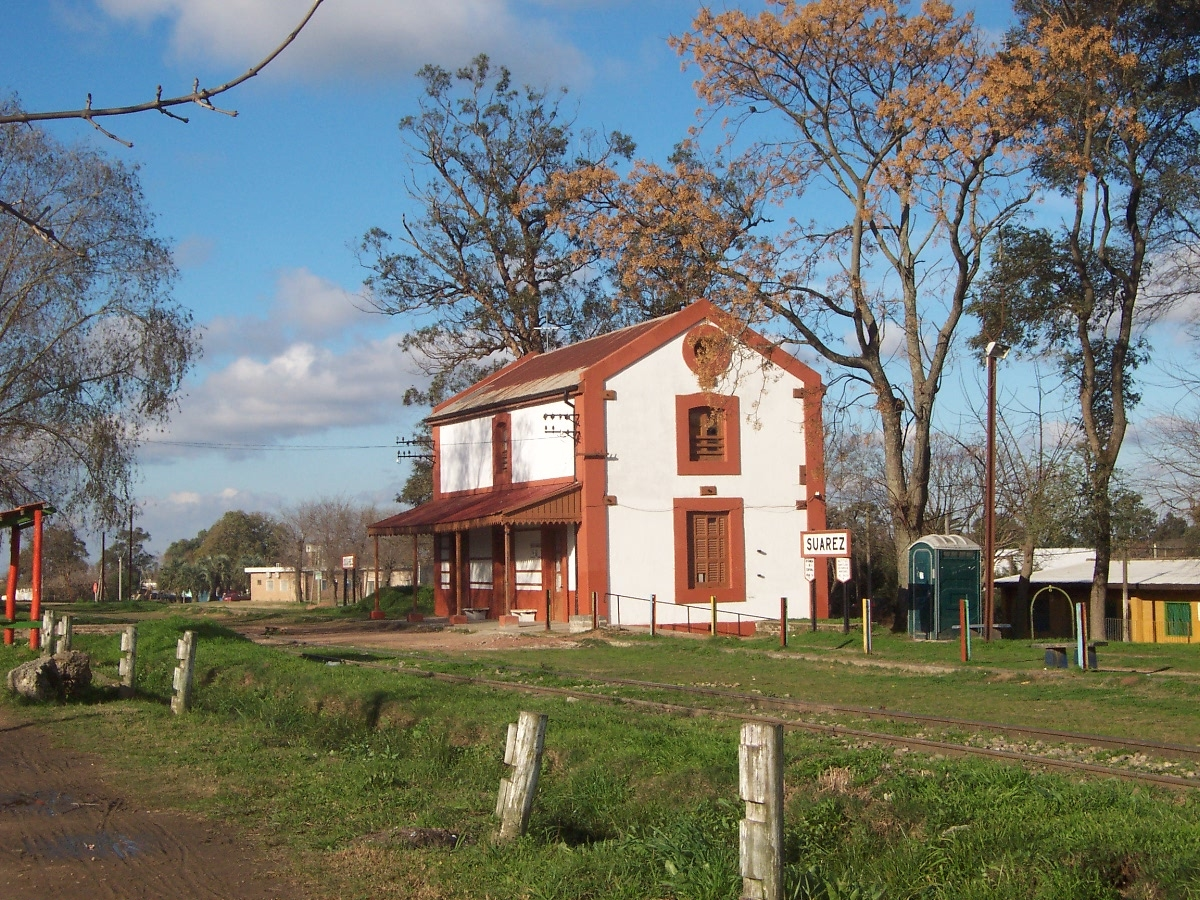

- Location in Uruguay
- Coordinates: 34°44′0″S 56°2′0″W
- Country: Uruguay
- Department: Canelones Department
- Founded: 1882

Population (2011)
  - Total: 6,570
- Time zone: UTC -3
- Postal code: 91200
- Dial plan: +598 2 (+7 digits)

Joaquín Suárez is a village in the Canelones Department of southern Uruguay. (Suárez is also the name of the municipality to which the village belongs.) It is at the intersection of Routes 84 and 74, northeast of Toledo and southwest of Pando. Sauce is about 10 kilometres (6.2 mi) to the north. The villages are all considered parts of the wider metropolitan area of Montevideo.

== History ==
Joaquín Suárez is named after the president of Uruguay from 1843–1852. The creation of a villa (town) in the area was approved by decree on 21 July 1866; it was founded on 15 October 1882 by Francisco Piria. It was declared a pueblo (village) on 2 October 1929 by the Act of Ley Nº 8.482.

== Places of worship ==
- Parish Church of St. Francis of Assisi (Roman Catholic, Dominican Sisters of the Presentation)

== Population ==
In 2011 Joaquín Suárez had a population of 6,570.

Location map of the Municipality of Suárez

Year	Population
1908	1,425
1963	2,357
1975	3,458
1985	4,175
1996	5,173
2004	6,214
2011	6,570

Source: Instituto Nacional de Estadística de Uruguay
