= Tala, Uruguay =

Tala
- City & Municipality
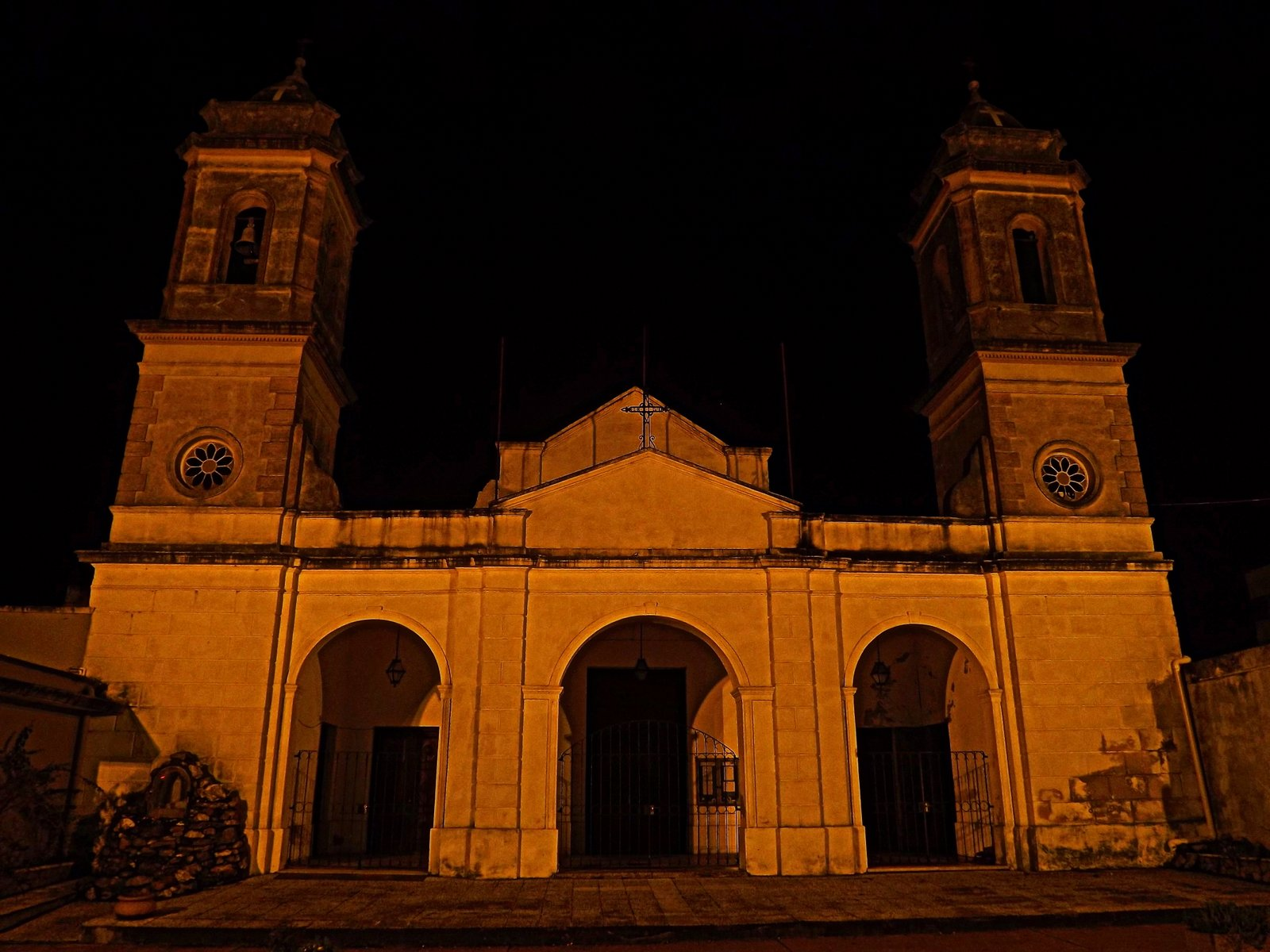
- Parish Church of the Most Holy Savior

- Location in Uruguay
- Coordinates: 34°21′0″S 55°46′0″W
- Country: Uruguay
- Department: Canelones
- Founded: 1860

Population (2011 Census)
  - Total: 5,089
- Time zone: UTC -3
- Postal code: 91800
- Dial plan: +598 4315 (+4 digits)
- Climate: Cfa

Tala is a town in the north of the Canelones Department of southern Uruguay.

Tala is also the name of the municipality to which the city belongs.

== Geography ==
=== Location ===
The city is located on the intersection of Route 7 with Route 12, about 25 kilometres (16 mi) north of San Jacinto, 20 kilometres (12 mi) east of San Ramón and 18 kilometres (11 mi) south of Fray Marcos of the Florida Department.

== History ==
Tala was founded as a "Pueblo" (village) by Decree of 2 May 1860. On 15 May 1925, its status was elevated to "Villa" (town) by the Act of Ley Nº 7.837. On 28 April 1960, its status was further elevated to "Ciudad" (city) by the Act of Ley Nº 12.708.

== Population ==
According to the 2011 census, Tala had a population of 5,089. In 2010, the Intendencia de Canelones had estimated a population of 9,499 for the municipality during the elections.

Location map of the Municipality of Tala

Year	Population
1908	9,086
1963	3,223
1975	3,613
1985	4,197
1996	4,720
2004	4,939
2011	5,089

Source: Instituto Nacional de Estadística de Uruguay

== Places of worship ==
- Parish Church of the Most Holy Savior (Roman Catholic)

== Notable people ==
- Conrado Villegas (1841–1884), general
- Hugo Alfaro (1917–1996), journalist
- José Herrera (born 1965), footballer
- Cristhian Stuani (born 1986), footballer
