= Route 6 (Uruguay) =

Road in Uruguay

Route 6
- Ruta 6
- Joaquín Suárez
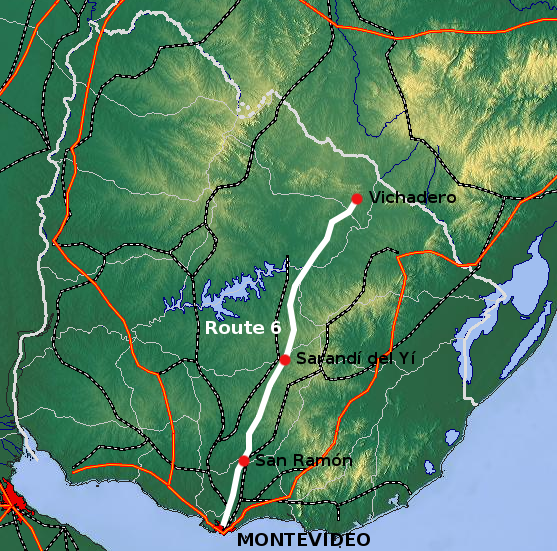

Route information
- Maintained by Ministry of Transport & Public Works
- Length: 428 km (266 mi)

Major junctions
- South end: Montevideo
- North end: Paso de Frontera

Location
- Country: Uruguay

Highway system
- National Routes of Uruguay
← Route 1	→ Route 27

Route 6 is a national route of Uruguay. In 1981, it was assigned the name Joaquín Suárez. It connects Montevideo with the northeast of Rivera Department, at Vichadero, with an extension reaching the border with Brazil. The road is approximately 428 kilometres long till Vichadero.

The distance notation along Route 6 uses the same Kilometre Zero reference as Routes 1, 3, 5, 7, 8, 9 and IB, which is the Pillar of Peace of Plaza de Cagancha in Central Montevideo.

The only cities apart from Montevideo it connects with are San Ramón in Canelones Department and Sarandí del Yí in Durazno Department. North of Canelones, Route 6 passes mostly through sparsely populated areas and connects with few small towns and villages.

== South end ==
Its extension in Montevideo is Avenida de las Instrucciones, which splits into Route 33 and Route 6 in Toledo Chico, just before the border with Canelones Department.

== Destinations and junctions ==
These are the populated places Route 6 passes through, as well as its main junctions with other National Roads.

Montevideo Department

- Km. 18 Avenida de las Instrucciones turns into Route 6. At this point, Route 7 merges with it and both go northeast.
- Km. 21 Route 33 north to Routes 11 & 65.

Canelones Department

- Km. 22 Toledo
- Km. 27 Route 6 splits from Route 7, turning north.
- Km. 32/33 Route 107 northwest to Sauce and Canelones, while Route 6 passes east of Sauce.
- Km. 35 Route 86 northeast to Route 11.
- Km. 50 Route 11 west to Canelones, southeast to Atlántida.
- Km. 51 Santa Rosa
- Km. 60 San Bautista, Route 81 east to Migues.
- Km. 70 Castellanos, Route 65 west and south to San Antonio and to Route 11, east to Route 7.
- Km. 79 San Ramón, Route 12 east to Tala, Route 63 southwest to Santa Lucía.

Florida Department

- Km. 87 Chamizo, Route 94 east to Fray Marcos.
- Km. 111 Route 56 west to Florida, east to Route 7.
- Km. 180 Capilla del Sauce

Durazno Department

- Km. 200 Sarandí del Yí, Route 14 west to Durazno, Trinidad & Mercedes, southeast to Lascano & La Coronilla.
- Km. 235 Route 43 northwest to San Gregorio de Polanco and to Routes 59 & 5.

Cerro Largo Department

- It crosses a distance of only 15 kilometres (9.3 mi) in this department from the stream Arroyo de Cordobés at Paso del Gordo to the Río Negro at Paso Pereira, where it passes over the river on a hand pulled wire cable ferry with single car capacity. 1.6 kilometres (0.99 mi) before the ferry, it meets with Route 38 which connects it with Route 7 near Tupambaé.

Tacuarembó

- Km. 360 Route 26 northwest to Tacuarembó, east-southeast to Melo & Río Branco.
- Km. 399 Route 44 (border with Rivera) northwest to Ansina, southeast to Melo.

Rivera Department

- Km. 427/428 Vichadero & Route 27 northwest to Rivera, while also connecting to Minas de Corrales via Routes 29 & 28.
- A smaller road extends north to Paso Hospital (Km. 445) and the Brazilian border (Km. 465).
