= San Antonio, Canelones =

San Antonio
- Village
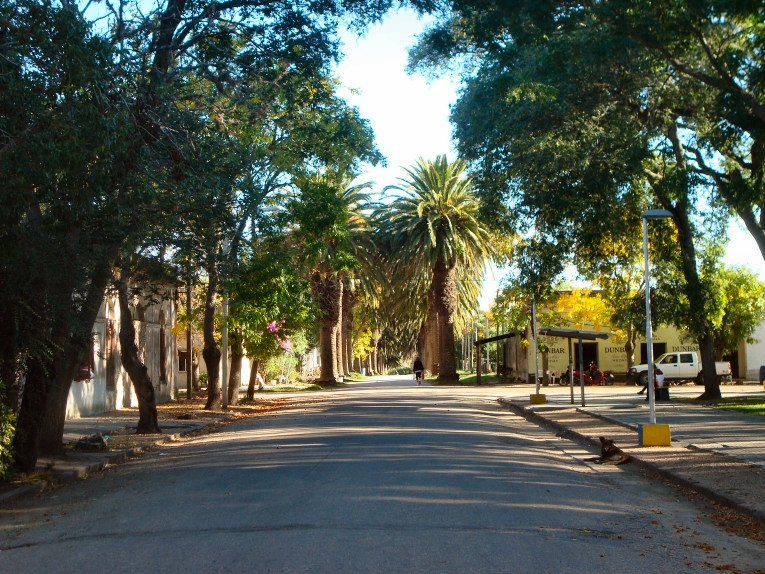
- Marcelino-Moreira street, San Antonio, Canelones

- Location in Uruguay
- Coordinates: 34°27′0″S 56°5′0″W
- Country: Uruguay
- Department: Canelones Department

Population (2011)
  - Total: 1,489
- Time zone: UTC -3
- Postal code: 90002
- Dial plan: +598 4313 (+4 digits)

San Antonio is a village in the Canelones Department of southern Uruguay.

San Antonio is also the name of the municipality to which the town belongs.

== Location ==
The village is located on Km.55 of Route 33, 3.3 kilometres (2.1 mi) south of its intersection with Route 81.

== History ==
Its status was elevated to "Pueblo" (village) by Decree of 14 November 1875.

== Population ==
In 2011 San Antonio had a population of 1,489. The Intendencia de Canelones has estimated a population of 3,552 for the municipality.

Location map of the Municipality of San Antonio

Year	Population
1908	2,919
1963	899
1975	1,120
1985	1,106
1996	1,293
2004	1,434
2011	1,489

Source: Instituto Nacional de Estadística de Uruguay

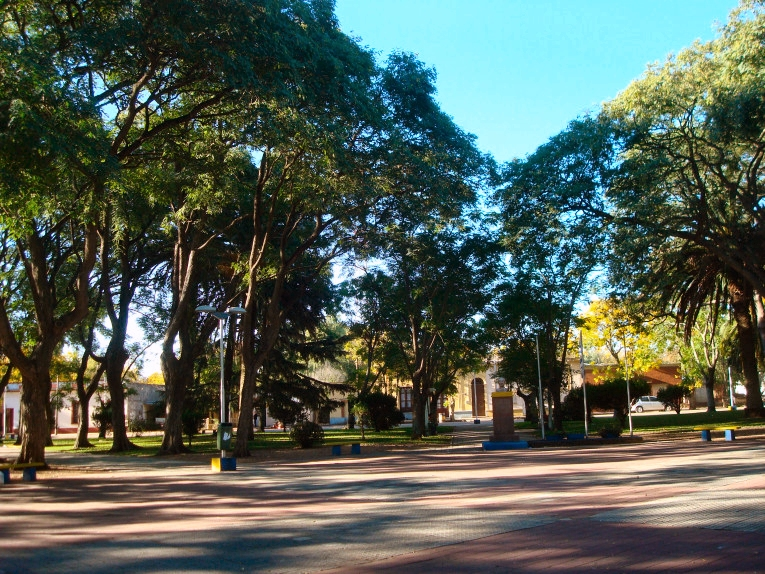
The central square of San Antonio, Canelones.

== Notable people ==
- José Arbío, football player.
- Yamandú Orsi, politician.

== Places of worship ==
- St. Anthony of Padua Parish Church (Roman Catholic)
