= Vergara, Uruguay =

Vergara
- City
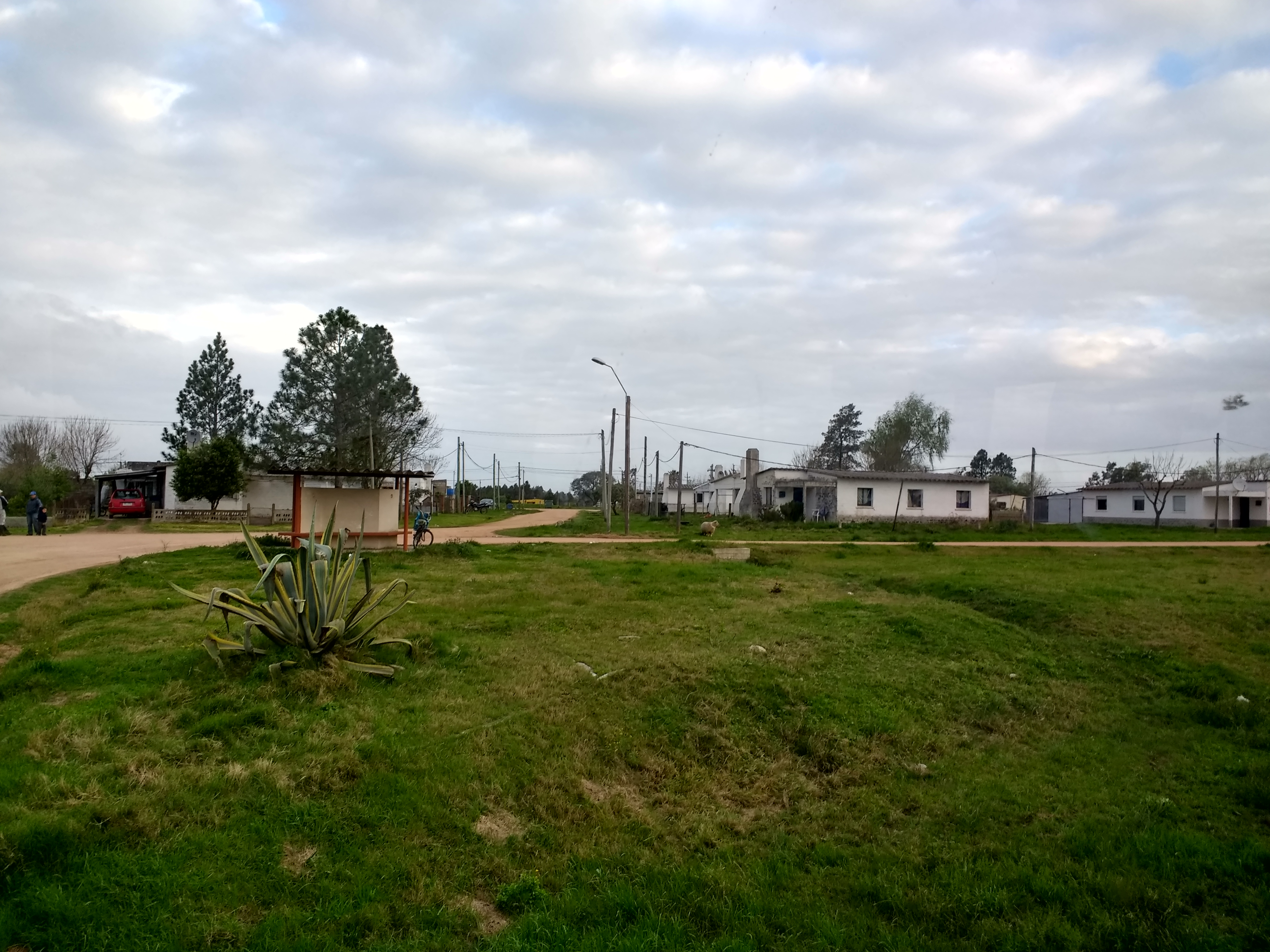

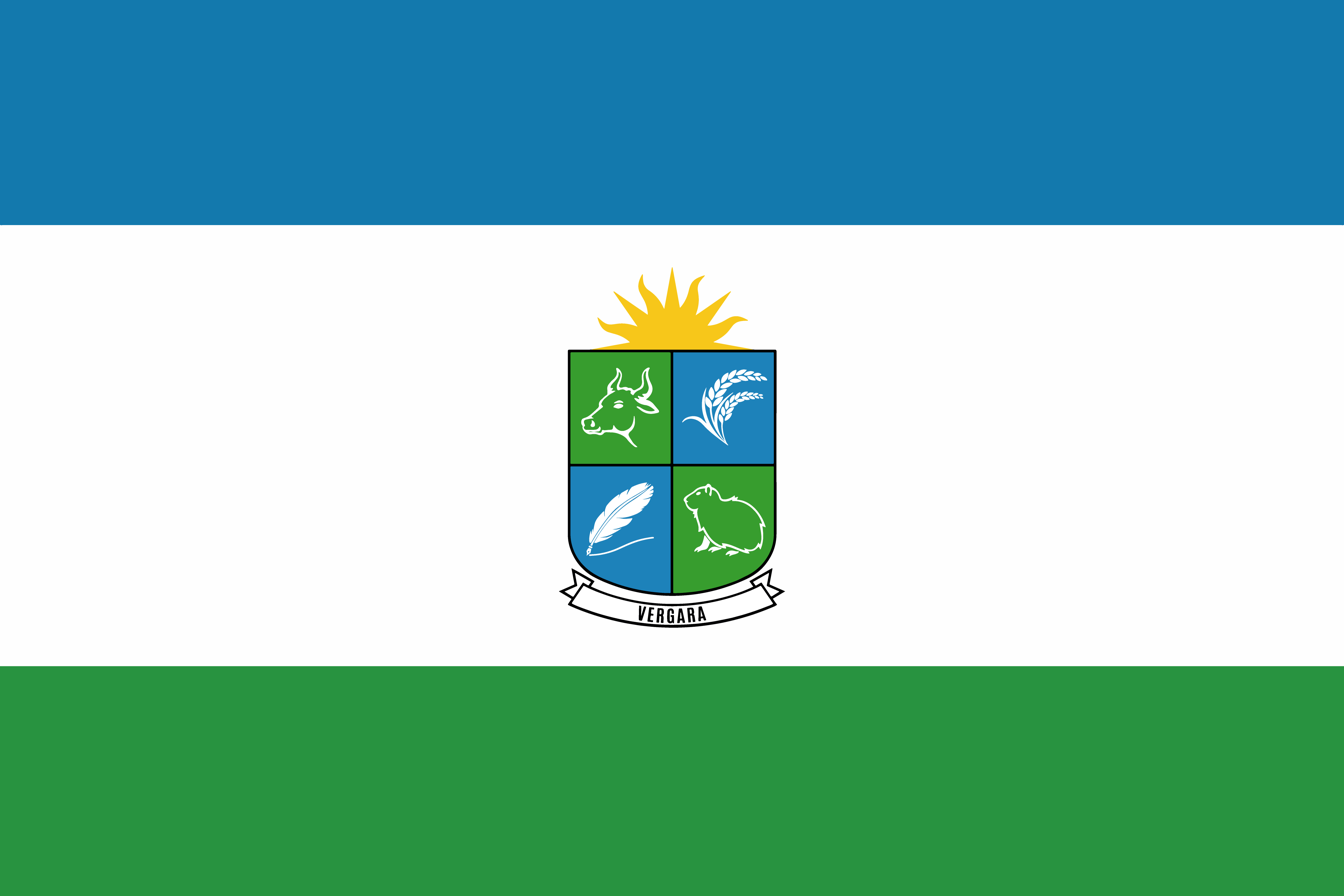
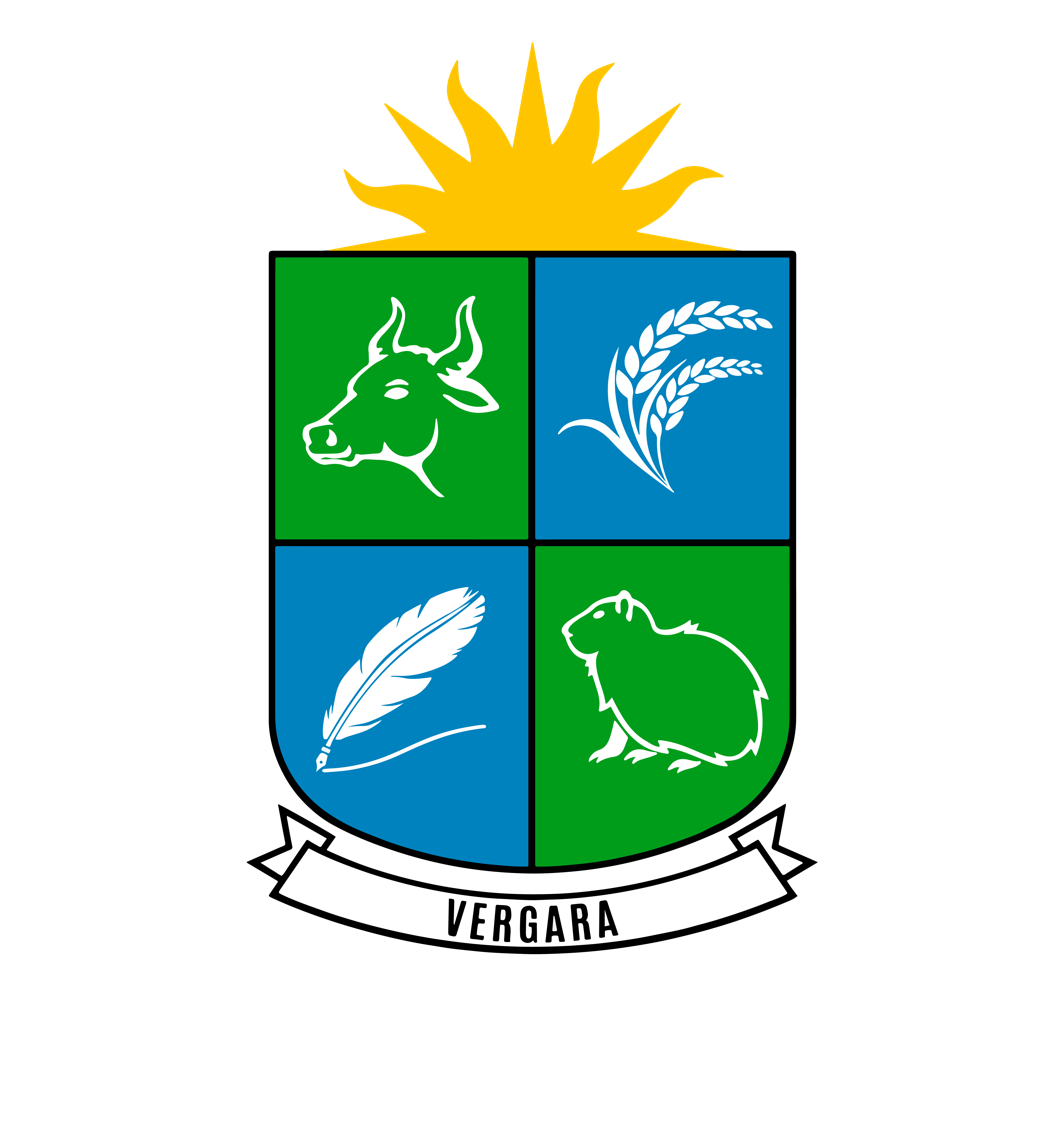
- Flag Coat of arms

- Location in Uruguay
- Coordinates: 32°57′0″S 53°56′0″W
- Country: Uruguay
- Department: Treinta y Tres

Population (2011 Census)
  - Total: 3,810
- Time zone: UTC -3
- Postal code: 33002
- Dial plan: +598 4458 (+4 digits)

Vergara is a small city in the Treinta y Tres Department of eastern Uruguay.

== Geography ==
It is located between Route 18, which passes to the northwest, and on Route 91, which passes to the southeast, and about 54 kilometres (34 mi) northeast of Treinta y Tres, the capital city of the department. The stream Arroyo Parao flows along the northeast limits of the town.

== History ==
Between 1877 and 1887, José Fernandes Vergara, after whom the city is named, bought from his sister-in-law Luisa Ignacia Saravia the fields intended for the founding of the town. At the time, it was known as Parao, since it was on the right bank of the Arroyo Parao. In April 1891, after surveyor Manuel Coronel divided the land, Vergara made the first sales.

Between 1890 and 1900, immigrants from different European countries began to arrive in the area, but especially from Italy. At the same time, existing ranch hands were displaced due to the construction of fencing around fields.

On 10 March 1903, the group of houses here was declared a "Pueblo" (village) by the Act of Ley Nº 2.788. On 13 December 1994, its status was elevated to "Ciudad" (city) by the Act of Ley Nº 16.668

== Population ==
In 2011, Vergara had a population of 3,810.

| Year | Population |
|---|---|
| 1963 | 2,837 |
| 1975 | 2,826 |
| 1985 | 3,379 |
| 1996 | 3,983 |
| 2004 | 3,985 |
| 2011 | 3,810 |

Source: Instituto Nacional de Estadística de Uruguay

== Places of worship ==
- Most Holy Sacrament Parish Church (Roman Catholic)
