= Migues =

- City & Municipality
- Location in Uruguay
- Coordinates: 34°29′0″S 55°38′0″W
- Country: Uruguay
- Department: Canelones

Population (2011 Census)
  - Total: 2,109
- Time zone: UTC -3
- Postal code: 91004
- Dial plan: +598 4317 (+4 digits)

Migues is a small city in the Canelones Department of southern Uruguay.

Migues is also the name of the municipality to which the town belongs.

== Geography ==
=== Location ===
The city is located on the intersection of Route 80 with Routes 81, 88 and 108, about 22 kilometres (14 mi) southeast of Tala and 6.5 kilometres (4.0 mi) west of Montes.

== History ==
On 27 June 1870, a "Pueblo" (village) named "Carmen" was created by the Act of Ley Nº 1.112 on the land belonging to Nicasia Figueredo de Migues, between two streams of the Solís river. It probably corresponds to the village eventually named "Migues". On 15 May 1925, its status was elevated to "Villa" (town) by the Act of Ley Nº 7.837. On 26 June 1970, its status was further elevated to "Ciudad" (city) by the Act of Ley Nº 13.866.

== Population ==
According to the 2011 census, Migues had a population of 2,109. In 2010, the Intendencia de Canelones had estimated a population of 3,720 for the municipality during the elections.

Location map of the Municipality of Migues

| Year | Population |
|---|---|
| 1908 | 5,000 |
| 1963 | 1,968 |
| 1975 | 2,183 |
| 1985 | 2,079 |
| 1996 | 2,004 |
| 2004 | 2,180 |
| 2011 | 2,109 |

Source: Instituto Nacional de Estadística de Uruguay

== Places of worship ==
- Parish Church of Our Lady of Mt. Carmel (Roman Catholic)
