= Empalme Olmos =

- Village
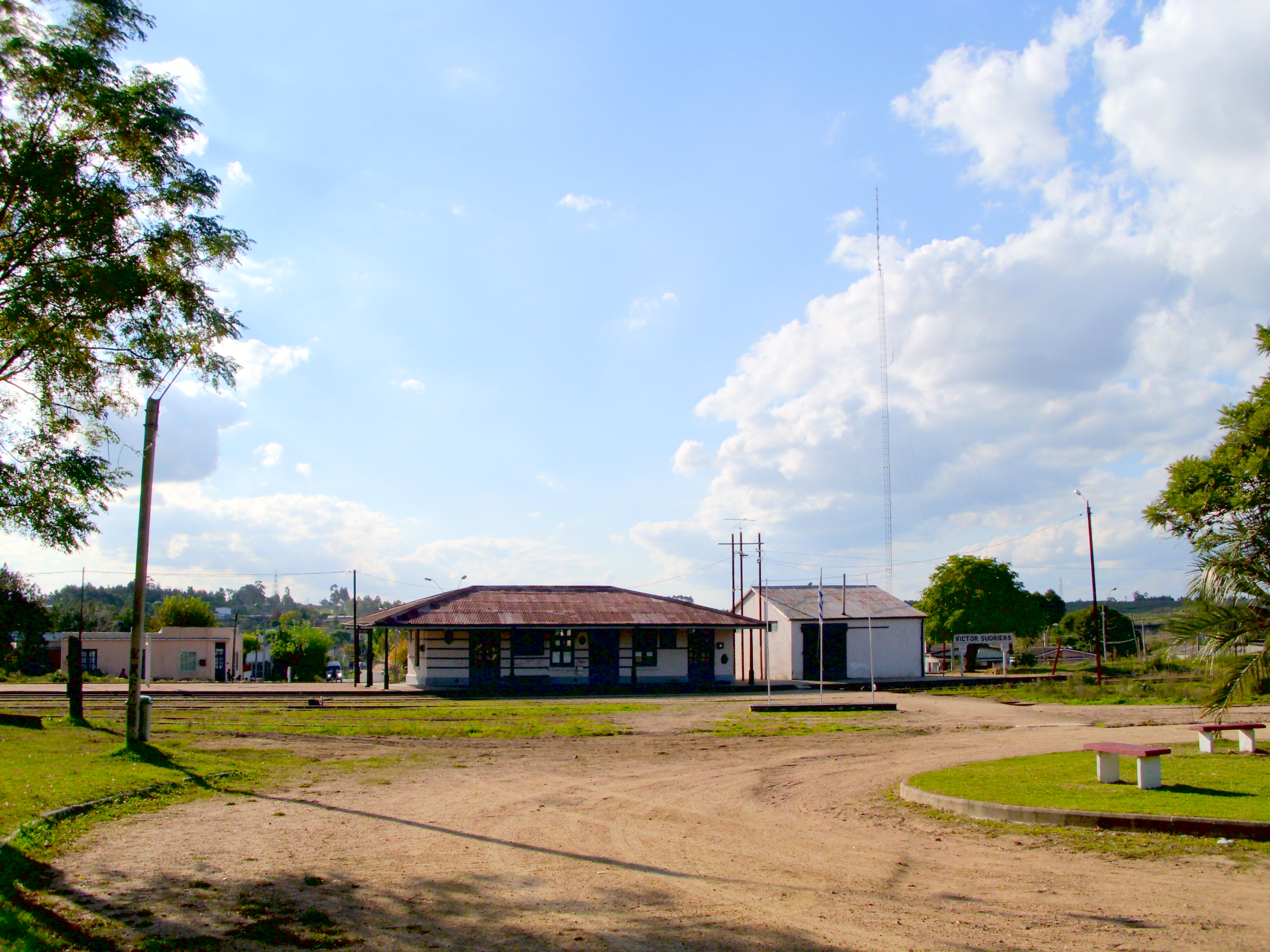
- Train station at Empalme Olmos

- Location in Uruguay
- Coordinates: 34°42′0″S 55°54′0″W
- Country: Uruguay
- Department: Canelones Department

Population (2011)
  - Total: 4,199
- Time zone: UTC -3
- Postal code: 91002
- Dial plan: +598 2 (+7 digits)

Empalme Olmos is a village in the Canelones Department of southern Uruguay.

Empalme Olmos is also the name of the municipality to which the town belongs.

== Geography ==
=== Location ===
The village is located at the junction of Route 8 with Routes 82 and 34, about 6 kilometres (3.7 mi) northeast of the city of Pando.

== History ==
Its status was elevated to "Pueblo" (village) on 3 November 1952 by the Act of Ley Nº 11.877.

== Population ==
In 2011 Empalme Olmos had a population of 4,199. In 2010, the Intendencia de Canelones had recorded a population of 5,497 for the municipality during the elections.

Location map of the Municipality of Empalme Olmos

Year	Population
1963	1,973
1975	2,108
1985	3,144
1996	3,815
2004	3,978
2011	4,199

Source: Instituto Nacional de Estadística de Uruguay

== Places of worship ==
- St. Rose of Lima Parish Church (Roman Catholic)

== Images ==
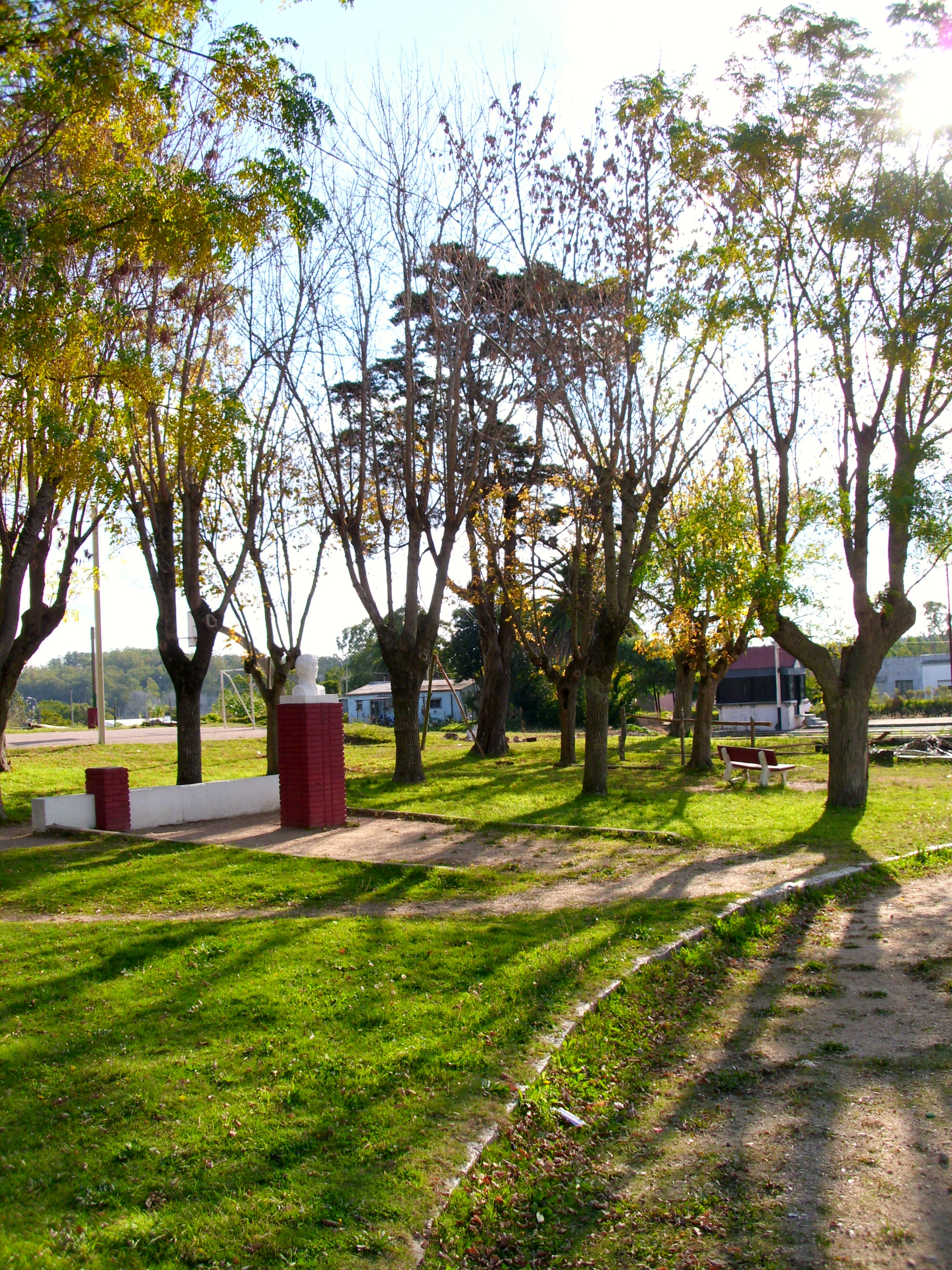
Plaza 30 de noviembre near the train station at Empalme Olmos.
