= San Jacinto, Uruguay =

San Jacinto
- City & Municipality
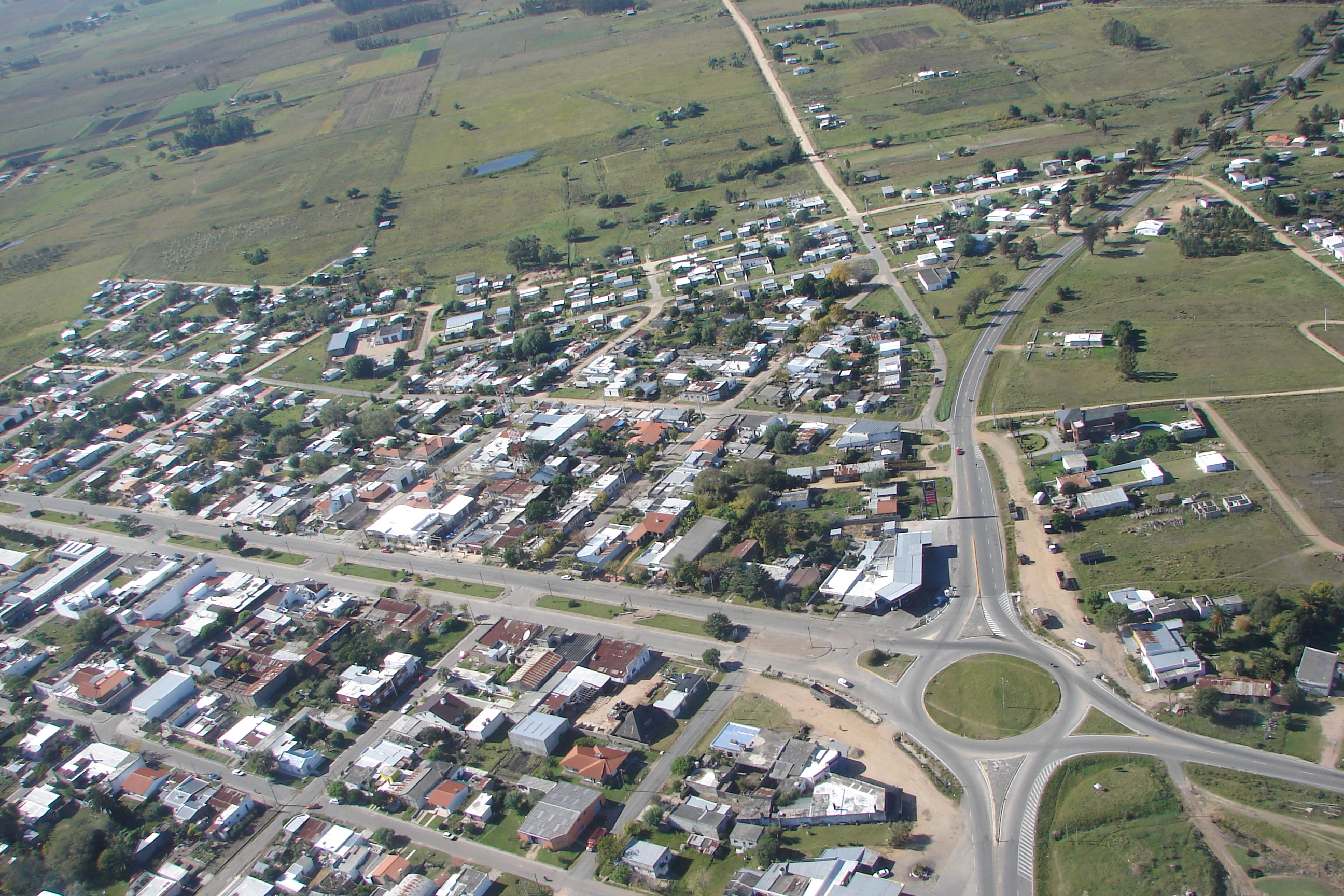

- Location in Uruguay
- Coordinates: 34°33′0″S 55°52′0″W
- Country: Uruguay
- Department: Canelones

Population (2011 Census)
  - Total: 4,510
- Time zone: UTC -3
- Postal code: 91300
- Dial plan: +598 4399 (+4 digits)

San Jacinto is a small city in the Canelones Department of southern Uruguay, and is also the name of the municipality to which the city belongs.

== Geography ==
=== Location ===
The city is located on the intersection of Route 7 with Route 11, about 53 kilometres (33 mi) northeast of the centre of Montevideo.

== History ==
On 20 June 1901, its status was elevated to "pueblo" (village) by the Act of Ley Nº 2.700. On 27 June 1951 it was further elevated to "Villa" (town) by the Act of Ley Nº 11.689. Finally, on 26 November 1976, its status was elevated to "Ciudad" (city) by the Act of Ley Nº 14.605.

== Population ==
According to the 2011 census, San Jacinto had a population of 4,510. In 2010 the Intendencia de Canelones had estimated a population of 7,052 for the municipality during the elections.

Year	Population
1908	4,616
1963	1,908
1975	2,244
1985	2,795
1996	3,596
2004	3,909
2011	4,510

Source: Instituto Nacional de Estadística de Uruguay

== Places of worship ==
- St. Hyacinth Parish Church (Roman Catholic); building by Luis García Pardo, 1941.
