= Sauce, Uruguay =

Sauce
- City & Municipality
- Location in Uruguay
- Coordinates: 34°39′0″S 56°4′0″W
- Country: Uruguay
- Department: Canelones
- Founded: 1851

Population (2011 Census)
  - Total: 6,132
- Time zone: UTC -3
- Postal code: 90800
- Dial plan: +598 2 (+7 digits)

Sauce is a small city and municipality in the Canelones Department of southern Uruguay.

== Geography ==
=== Location ===
The city is located on Km. 36 of Route 6 and its intersection with Routes 67, 86 and 107. It is part of the wider metropolitan area of Montevideo.

The stream Arroyo Sauce flows along the east and the south limits of the city, and also through the park Parque Artigas.

== History ==
It was founded on 12 October 1851. On 29 September 1915 it was declared a "pueblo" (town) by the Act of Ley Nº 5.336, and on 15 May 1925, its status was elevated to "villa" (village) by the Act of Ley Nº 7.837. On 18 June 1973 its status was further elevated to "ciudad" (city) by the Act of Ley Nº 14.138.

== Population ==
According to the 2011 census, Sauce had a population of 6,132. In 2010, the Intendencia de Canelones had estimated a population of 12,041 for the municipality during the elections.

Location map of the Municipality of Sauce

Year	Population
1908	6,935
1963	3,227
1975	3,911
1985	4,294
1996	4,932
2004	5,797
2011	6,132

Source: Instituto Nacional de Estadística de Uruguay

== Places of worship ==
- Parish Church of the Holy Family (Roman Catholic)

== Notable people ==
- Emiliano Albín, footballer

== Archaeology ==
Uruguayan researchers working at the Arroyo del Vizcaíno site near Sauce found evidence suggesting that humans were in the area as far back as 30,000 years ago. This was discovered through the analysis of the ancient Lestodon sloth bones. Deep slash markings on some of the bones were discovered; they indicate the use of human stone tools.
