= La Paz, Canelones =

La Paz
- City & Municipality
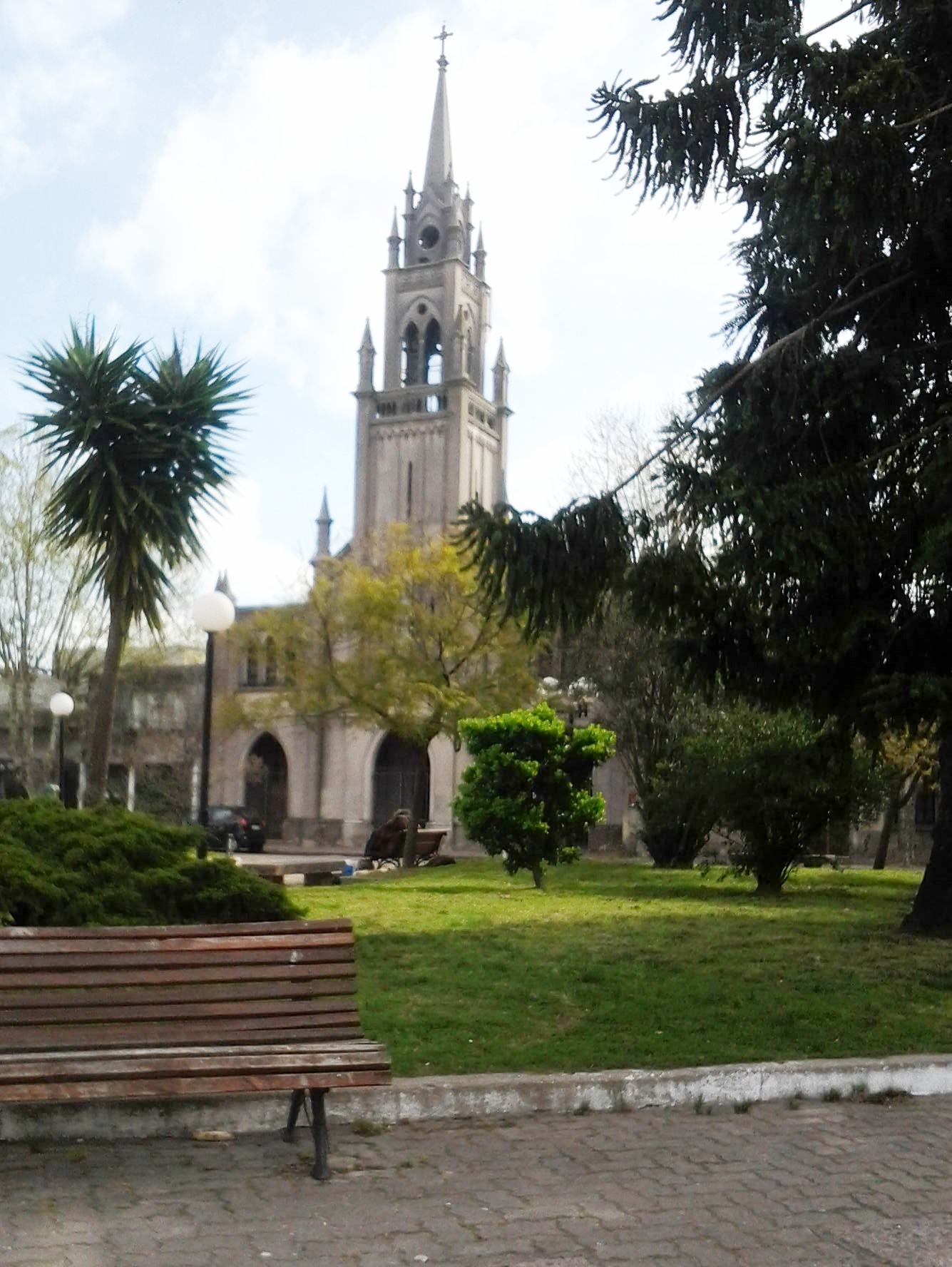

- Location within Uruguay
- Coordinates: 34°45′42″S 56°13′24″W
- Country: Uruguay
- Department: Canelones
- Founded: 1872
- Elevation: 50 m (160 ft)

Population (2011 Census)
  - Total: 20,524
- Time zone: UTC -3
- Postal code: 90100
- Dial plan: +598 2 (+7 digits)

La Paz is a small city in the Canelones Department, southern Uruguay. It gives the name to the municipality to which it belongs.

== Geography ==
The city is located 2.5 kilometres (1.6 mi) east of Route 5 on the border with Montevideo Department. It belongs to the wider Montevideo metropolitan area.

== History ==
The first Spanish inhabitants settled here in 1758, when the land was distributed to settlers for development. The railroad arrived here in 1868. The village of La Paz was founded on 28 February 1872, its name as a homage to the "Revolution of the Lances" (1870–1872). At the time it was a middle-class resort. The only Jewish cemetery of the country was created here in 1917.

On 15 May 1925, its status was elevated to "Villa" (town) by the Act of Ley Nº 7.837, while on 19 December 1957 it was further elevated to "Ciudad" (city) by the Act of Ley Nº 12.477.

The area was known for its vineyards, wine cellars and agroindustry. There were marble and granite quarries, used for the development of Montevideo and Buenos Aires, in Argentina. These quarries brought many Italian immigrants to the area. The exploitation of granite is still active. The city is also known for its meat industry.

== Population ==
According to the 2011 census, La Paz has a population of 20,524. In 2010, the Intendencia de Canelones had estimated a population of 23,500 for the municipality during the elections.

Location map of the Municipality of La Paz

Year	Population
1908	2,505
1963	13,226
1975	14,653
1985	16,209
1996	19,547
2004	19,832
2011	20,524

Source: Instituto Nacional de Estadística de Uruguay

== Places of worship ==
- Nuestra Señora de La Paz, La Paz Church (Roman Catholic)

== Government ==
The city mayor as of July 2010 is Juan Tons.
