= Canelones Department =

Department of Uruguay

Canelones
- Department
- Flag Coat of arms

- Location of Canelones Department in Uruguay
- Coordinates (Canelones): 34°31′S 56°17′W
- Country: Uruguay
- Established: 1816
- Capital of Department: Canelones

Government
  - Intendant: Francisco Legnani
  - Ruling party: Frente Amplio

Area
  - Total: 4,536 km^{2} (1,751 sq mi)

Population (2023 census)
  - Total: 608,956
  - Density: 134.2/km^{2} (347.7/sq mi)
- Demonym: Canario
- Time zone: UTC-3 (UYT)
- ISO 3166 code: UY-CA
- Website: www.imcanelones.gub.uy

The Departament de Canelones (Spanish: Departamento de Canelones) is one of the 19 Uruguayan departments. With an area of 4,536 km^{2} (1,751 sq mi) and 608,956 inhabitants at the 2023 Census, it is located in the south of Uruguay. Its capital is Canelones. Ciudad de la Costa is the largest city by total population and Las Piedras is the largest city with an official census.

== Geography ==
Neighbouring departments are Maldonado and Lavalleja to the East, Florida to the North, San José to the West, and Montevideo to the South. Part of the southern border is formed by the Río de la Plata. It is the second smallest department of the country after that of Montevideo, but the second largest in population.

Located in the humid templated region, the average temperature is low compared to that of the rest of the country (around 15 °C), as are the levels of precipitation (up to 2,000 mm yearly, on average).

By area Canelones Department is the second smallest of Uruguay's 19 departments.

=== Topography and hydrography ===
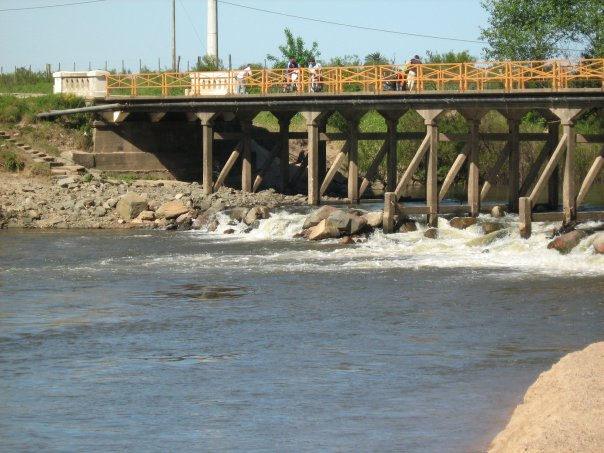
Santa Lucía River, at San Ramón.

Canelones Department, is characterized by flat lands and absence of relief (like most parts of Uruguay), with small coastal sand dunes at the south, and with meadows and woods in the center, north and west.

The department is rich in waterways, with many rivers and streams. However, there are two rivers that stand out for their importance: the Santa Lucía River and the Río de la Plata, which is actually a sea of salt water. On the coastline formed by the Río de la Plata, there are many spa towns and their respective beaches.

Santa Lucia River, meanwhile, forms the northern boundary with Florida, which is separated by a bridge known as the Paso Pache.

=== Regions ===
Despite being a small department, Canelones has a population of over 500,000 inhabitants and one of the highest population densities in the country with 114 inhabitants per square kilometer.

The department is divided into approximately 20 sections. Within these, there are significant populations centers, some of which have the status of municipality, while others are part of cities formed recently by decree, and then there are also those that do not have enough inhabitants and are therefore often considered simple population entities with no mayor or government, remaining under the direct jurisdiction of the Municipality of Canelones (in Spanish, Intendencia Municipal Canelones or Comuna Canaria), which is based in the departmental capital, Canelones.

== History ==
Canelones was one of the nine original departments created in 1830. Over the years its boundaries have changed little.

== Economy ==
Agriculture is one of the principal contributors to the economy of Canelones. The cultivation of grapevines is widespread, and the area is a major contributor to Uruguay's burgeoning wine industry. In addition, cereal crops – principally maize – are produced, as are a wide variety of fruits and vegetables. Tourism, in the eastern coastal area, is also a major source of income for the department, and has enabled the development of important urban centres, such as Atlántida.

== Demographics ==
Ethnic groups in Canelones (2023 est.)
Ethnic groups	Percent
White	87.7%
Black	9.3%
Indigenous	6.2%
Asian	0.6%
None/Other/Unspecified	6.2%

At the 2011 census, Canelones Department had a population of 520,187 (253,124 male and 267,063 female) and 222,193 (+44.25% than in 2004 (153,931)) households; at the 2023 Census this had grown to 608,956 inhabitants. The average household size in 2011 was 2.3 persons.

Demographic data for Canelones Department in 2010:

- Population growth rate: 1,095%
- Birth rate: 14.83 births/1,000 people
- Death rate: 8.45 deaths/1,000 people
- Average age: 32.9 (31.4 males, 34.3 females)
- Life expectancy at birth
  - Total population: 76.37 years
  - Male: 72.95 years
  - Female: 80.00 years
- Average per household income: 25,087 pesos/month
- Urban per capita income: 10,015 pesos/month

2010 Data Source:

Main urban centres
Other towns and villages
Population stated according to the 2011 census.

City / Town	Population
Ciudad de la Costa (**)	113,257
Las Piedras	71,258
Barros Blancos	31,650
Pando	25,947
La Paz	20,524
Canelones	19,865
Santa Lucía	16,742
Progreso	16,244
Villa Crespo y San Andrés	9,813
Colonia Nicolich	9,624
Fracc. Camino del Andaluz y R.84	9,295
Salinas *	8,626
Parque del Plata *	7,896
San Ramón	7,133
Joaquín Suárez	6,570
Sauce	6,132
Atlántida *	5,562
Tala	5,089
Neptunia *	4,774
Pinamar – Pinepark *	4,724
San Jacinto	4,510
Toledo	4,397

City / Town	Population
Villa Aeroparque	4,307
Empalme Olmos	4,199
Santa Rosa	3,727
Marindia *	3,543
Las Toscas *	3,146
Cerrillos	2,508
Estación Atlántida *	2,274
Migues	2,109
San Bautista	1,973
San Luis *	1,878
Dr. Francisco Soca	1,797
Montes	1,760
La Floresta *	1,595
Fracc. sobre R.74	1,513
San Antonio	1,489
Villa San José	1,419
Villa Felicidad	1,344
Estación La Floresta *	1,313
Juanicó	1,305
City Golf *	1,104
Aguas Corrientes	1,047

Town / Village	Population
Costa Azul	965
Barrio Cópola	826
Lomas de Carrasco	806
Estanque de Pando	770
Jardines de Pando	756
Totoral del Sauce	746
Olmos	662
Seis Hermanos	622
Villa Argentina	622
Villa El Tato	615
Costa y Guillamón	550
Villa Paz S.A.	542
Cuchilla Alta	527
Castellanos	520
Villa Porvenir	507
Barrio La Lucha	492

(* Resorts of the Costa de Oro – ** Sum result. See main article for all censal areas included.)

Rural population

Map showing the municipalities of Canelones Department

According to the 2011 census, Canelones department had a rural population of 48,219 (9.3%).

== Government ==
The executive power is exercised by the Intendencia Departamental de Canelones. The Intendant is elected every five years with the possibility of reelection. The legislative power is exercised by the Junta Departamental.

On 15 March 2010, by the Act of Ley Nº 18.653, the following Municipalities were formed in the Canelones Department:

Source: Intendencia Municipal de Canelones
* Stated as 2004 estimates.
** Source: El Observador (2010)

Municipality	Population
Aguas Corrientes	2,180*
Atlántida	9,251*
Barros Blancos	27,687*
Canelones	27,338
Ciudad de la Costa	75,990*
Colonia Nicolich	13,757*
Empalme Olmos	6,747
Joaquín Suárez	16,135
La Floresta	6,561*
La Paz	19,532

Municipality	Population
Las Piedras	74,436*
Los Cerrillos	7,369
Migues	3,720**
Montes	1,968**
Pando	32,603
Parque del Plata	8,122*
Paso Carrasco	22,688
Progreso	20,450*
Salinas	17,997

Municipality	Population
San Antonio	3,552
San Bautista	4,045
San Jacinto	6,674
San Ramón	8,554
Santa Lucía	18,346
Santa Rosa	6,008
Sauce	14,815
Soca	3,829
Tala	9,499
Toledo	16,197

== See also ==
- List of populated places in Uruguay#Canelones Department
