= Route 7 (Uruguay) =

Road in Uruguay

Route 7
- Ruta 7
- General Aparicio Saravia
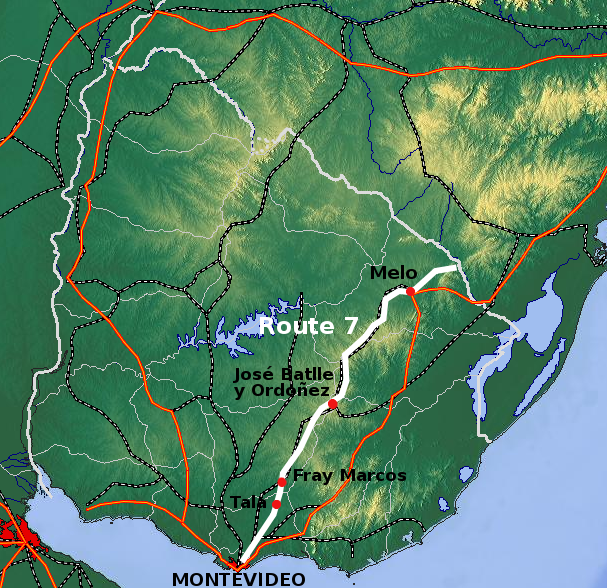

Route information
- Maintained by Ministry of Transport & Public Works
- Length: 387 km (240 mi)

Major junctions
- South end: Montevideo
- North end: Melo

Location
- Country: Uruguay

Highway system
- National Routes of Uruguay
← Route 1	→ Route 26

Route 7 is a national route of Uruguay. In 1981, it was assigned the name General Aparicio Saravia, a national hero of Uruguay. It connects Montevideo with Melo in the northeast. The road is approximately 387 kilometres in length.

The distance notation along Route 5 uses the same Kilometre Zero reference as Routes 1, 3, 5, 6, 8, 9 and IB, which is the Pillar of Peace of Plaza de Cagancha in Central Montevideo.

== See also ==
- Aparicio Saravia
