= Pando, Uruguay =

Pando
- City & Municipality
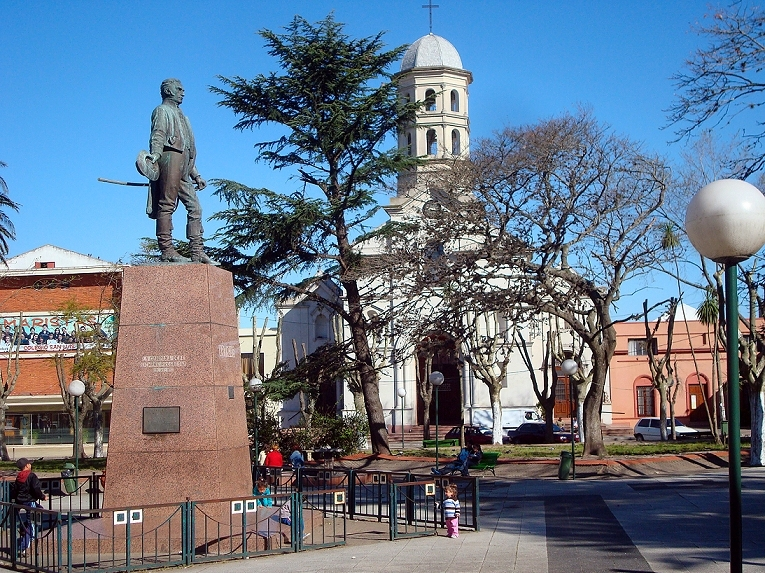
- The central square of Pando with the Church of the Immaculate Conception in the background

- Location within Uruguay
- Coordinates: 34°43′0″S 55°57′30″W
- Country: Uruguay
- Department: Canelones
- Founded: 1788

Population (2011 Census)
  - Total: 25,947
- Time zone: UTC -3
- Postal code: 91000
- Dial plan: +598 2 (+7 digits)

Location of Pando in Canelones Department

Pando is a city in the Canelones Department of Uruguay. It is an important commercial and industrial centre which has become part of the wider Montevideo metropolitan area.

Pando is also the name of the municipality to which the city belongs and which includes several other small populated areas and rural areas from the limits of the Ciudad de la Costa to the south to the limits of Route 7 to the northwest.

== Geography ==
The city is located on Route 8, about 29 kilometres (18 mi) northeast of Montevideo. The stream Arroyo Pando flows by the east limits of the city.

=== Climate ===
The climate in this area is characterized by hot, humid summers and generally mild to cool winters. According to the Köppen Climate Classification system, Pando has a humid subtropical climate, abbreviated "Cfa" on climate maps.

Climate data for Pando, Uruguay
Month	Jan	Feb	Mar	Apr	May	Jun	Jul	Aug	Sep	Oct	Nov	Dec	Year
Mean daily maximum °C (°F)	28 (83)	28 (82)	26 (78)	22 (71)	18 (64)	15 (59)	14 (58)	15 (59)	17 (63)	20 (68)	23 (74)	26 (79)	21 (70)
Mean daily minimum °C (°F)	17 (62)	16 (61)	15 (59)	12 (53)	9 (48)	6 (43)	6 (43)	6 (43)	8 (46)	9 (49)	12 (54)	15 (59)	11 (52)
Average precipitation mm (inches)	74 (2.9)	66 (2.6)	99 (3.9)	99 (3.9)	84 (3.3)	81 (3.2)	74 (2.9)	79 (3.1)	76 (3)	66 (2.6)	74 (2.9)	79 (3.1)	950 (37.4)
Source: Weatherbase

== History ==
Pando was founded on 13 May 1788. It took its name from one of its first inhabitants who had moved there in 1730. It was the seat of the Guardia del Pando, a force against Portuguese advances. It had acquired the status of "Pueblo" (village) before the Independence of Uruguay.

According to the Act of Ley Nº 759, on 11 March 1863 it held the status of "Villa" (town). On 5 August 1920, its status was elevated to "Ciudad" (city) by the Act of Ley Nº 7.252. At the time, it was an industrial center and had a track for airplanes which became an airport in 1928. This airport was moved to Carrasco in 1948 and the Military School of Aeronautics took its place.

In 1969, the Tupamaros took part in a violent occupation known as the Taking of Pando (Spanish: Toma de Pando).

== Places of worship ==
- Parish Church of the Immaculate Conception (Roman Catholic)

== Demographics ==
According to the 2011 census, Pando had a population of 25,947. In 2010, the Intendencia de Canelones had estimated a population of 31,713 for the municipality during the elections.

Historical population
Year	Pop.	±% p.a.
1908	7,927	—
1963	12,876	+0.89%
1975	16,406	+2.04%
1985	19,795	+1.90%
1996	23,384	+1.53%
2004	24,004	+0.33%
2011	25,947	+1.12%
Source: "Statistics of urban localities (1908–2004)" (PDF). INE. 2012.
