= Telephone numbers in Uruguay =

- Country: Uruguay
- Continent: South America
- Regulator: URSEC
- Numbering plan type: Closed
- NSN length: 8
- Country code: +598
- International access: 00

Telephone numbers in Uruguay use the calling code +598. In 2010, national long distance calling was eliminated, and area codes were dropped.

ANTEL (Spanish abbreviation for National Administration of Telecommunications) is Uruguay's state-owned company for telecommunications.

== History ==
Original phone numbers had between 4 and 7 digits. To make a local phone call, those digits were all that were necessary. To make a call between two cities from different departments, required dialing zero, an area code, and the local number.

On August 29, 2010, all phone numbers were changed 8 digits, according to the National Numbering Plan. Area codes were eliminated. This plan was implemented by URSEC (Spanish abbreviation for Regulator Unit of Services of Communications).

== National Numbering Plan ==
=== Montevideo metropolitan area ===
In the metropolitan area, national numbers begin with 2. This 8-digit number consists of the former area code (2), followed by the old 7-digit number.

Examples

| Area code | Former number | Current number |
|---|---|---|
| 2 | 204 5199 | 2204 5199 |
| 2 | 628 8327 | 2628 8327 |
| 2 | 908 1350 | 2908 1350 |

=== Outside Montevideo ===
In the rest of the country, national numbers begin with 4. This 8-digit number consists of the number 4, followed by the former area code, followed by the old phone number. For example:

Colonia

| Former area code | Former number | Current number |
|---|---|---|
| 52 | 24999 | 4522 4999 |

The department of Maldonado is an exception: the 8-digit number consists of the former area code 42, followed by the old phone number, with no additional digit 4 set before:

San Carlos (Maldonado Department)

| Former area code | Former number | Current number |
|---|---|---|
| 42 | 668350 | 4266 8350 |

== International calling ==
For calls from outside the country into Uruguay, the country code (+598) is prefixed to the 8-digit national number, while replacing the "+" with the international calling prefix used in the originating country.

=== Examples ===
==== Call to Montevideo ====
| Current number | Dialed from outside Uruguay |
|---|---|
| 2204 5199 | +598 2204 5199 |

==== Call to Colonia ====
| Current number | Dialed from outside Uruguay |
|---|---|
| 4522 4999 | +598 4522 4999 |

=== Former area codes and corresponding new telephone numbers ===
| City | Former area code | Current number |
|---|---|---|
| Canelones, Canelones | 33 | 433x xxxx |
| Maldonado, Maldonado | 42 | 42xx xxxx |
| Rocha, Rocha | 47 | 447x xxxx |
| Treinta y Tres, Treinta y Tres | 45 | 445x xxxx |
| Melo, Cerro Largo | 64 | 464x xxxx |
| Rivera, Rivera | 62 | 462x xxxx |
| Artigas, Artigas | 77 | 477x xxxx |
| Salto, Salto | 73 | 473x xxxx |
| Paysandú, Paysandú | 72 | 472x xxxx |
| Fray Bentos, Río Negro | 56 | 456x xxxx |
| Mercedes, Soriano | 53 | 453x xxxx |
| Colonia del Sacramento, Colonia | 52 | 452x xxxx |
| San José de Mayo, San José | 34 | 434x xxxx |
| Trinidad, Flores | 364 | 4364 xxxx |
| Florida, Florida | 35 | 435x xxxx |
| Minas, Lavalleja | 44 | 444x xxxx |
| Durazno, Durazno | 36 | 436x xxxx |
| Tacuarembó, Tacuarembó | 63 | 463x xxxx |
| Montevideo, Montevideo | 2 | 2xxx xxxx |

== Mobile telephony ==
When mobile telephony arrived in Uruguay, Movicom BellSouth was the only service provider. Mobile phone numbers began with digits 09, followed by 6 digits: 09xxxxxx.

In 1994, ANTEL started its own mobile phone service, creating Ancel, which later merged into Antel. This created a numbering change for mobile telephony. One number was assigned to each company to identify their numbers. This digit varied between 09 and the number. Movicom was assigned to 4, and Ancel to 9. Movicom numbers changed to 094xxxxxx, and new Ancel numbers became 099xxxxxx.

In 2003, Claro came to Uruguay (originally as CTI Móvil). Numbers of this company were prefixed by 096: 096xxxxxx.

In 2004, Telefónica bought Movicom Bellsouth and changed its name to Movistar.

When the companies reached one million users, they had to be assigned other prefixes.

- Antel (ADMINISTRACIÓN NACIONAL DE TELECOMUNICACIONES): 099, 098, 092 and 091.
- Movistar (TELEFONICA MOVILES DE URUGUAY S.A.): 094, 095 and 093.
- Claro (AM WIRELESS URUGUAY S.A.): 096 and 097.

URSEC has reserved 084, 089 and 086 for a possible future use.

== From abroad ==
When calling a cell phone in Uruguay from abroad, you only need to add the country code (598) to the 9-digit cell phone number, without the zero.

| Network | Current number | Dialing from abroad |
|---|---|---|
| Movistar | 095 xxx xxx | +598 95 xxx xxx |
| Antel | 099 xxx xxx | +598 99 xxx xxx |
| Claro | 096 xxx xxx | +598 96 xxx xxx |

Since the implementation of number portability in Uruguay, the initial digits of a number do not necessarily indicate the company to which it belongs. Example: the number 094 111 111 may have been initially assigned by the company Movistar, but then the user may have switched to the telephone service provided by another company (Antel or Claro), keeping the same number.
