= Municipality of La Floresta =

Canelones Department municipality, Uruguay

Municipality of La Floresta Municipio de La Floresta
- Municipality
- Municipality of La Floresta
- Location of the municipality of La Floresta within the department of Canelones and Uruguay.
- Coordinates: 34.7°S 55.7°W
- Country: Uruguay
- Department: Canelones
- Founded: 15 March 2010
- Seat: La Floresta

Government
  - Mayor: Duilio Erramouspe (FA)

Area
  - Total: 65.5 km^{2} (25.3 sq mi)

Population (2011)
  - Total: 7,310
  - Density: 112/km^{2} (289/sq mi)
- Time zone: UTC-3
- Constituencies: CLB, CLC

The municipality of La Floresta is one of the municipalities of Canelones Department, Uruguay, established on 15 March 2010. Its seat is the city of La Floresta.

== History ==
The municipality was created by the provision of Law No. 18653 of 15 March 2010, as part of Canelones Department, and it includes the CLB and CLC constituencies.

== Location ==
The municipality lies at the southeast side of the Canelones Department. The main activity of the municipality is tourism, as it is made up of a chain of spas on the Río de la Plata.

Its area is 65.5 km². The census localities that make it up, had a population of 7,310 inhabitants, in 2011.

== Localities ==
- Las Vegas
- La Floresta
- Estación La Floresta
- Costa Azul
- Bello Horizonte
- Guazuvirá
- San Luis
- Los Titanes
- La Tuna
- Araminda
- Santa Lucía del Este
- Biarritz
- Cuchilla Alta
- El Galeón
- Santa Ana
- Balneario Argentino
- Jaureguiberry
