= Arroyo Tropa Vieja =

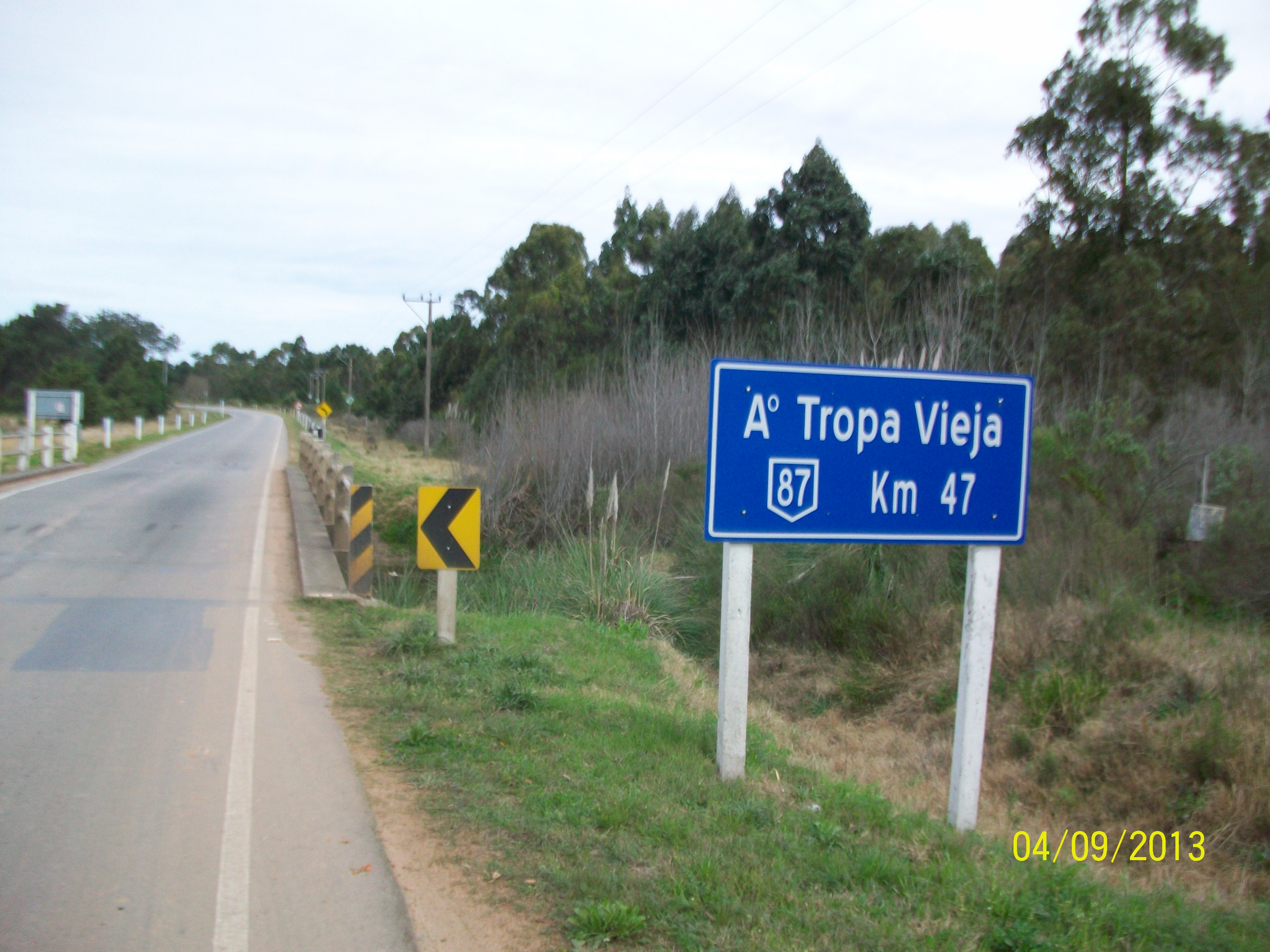

Location
- Country: Uruguay
- Department: Canelones Department

Physical characteristics
- Source
  - location: Laguna del Cisne
- Mouth
  - location: Pando Creek
  - coordinates: 33°47′33″S 55°52′9″W
- Length: 2.07 km (1.29 mi)
- Basin size: 78 km^{2} (30 sq mi)

Arroyo Tropa Vieja is a Uruguayan river course located in the department of Canelones.

Originating in Laguna del Cisne, in the town Marindia and passes through the towns of Salinas, Pinamar, Neptunia and flows into Pando Creek. Its approximate length is 2.07 km and near its mouth it is 2 meters above sea level. It is also known by the names of "Arroyo Piedra del Toro" or "Cañada Piedra del Toro de Pando".

It crosses the towns of Salinas to the north by Route 87 and Neptunia by Ruta Interbalnearia General Líber Seregni and Route 10.
