= Laguna del Cisne =

Lake in Uruguay

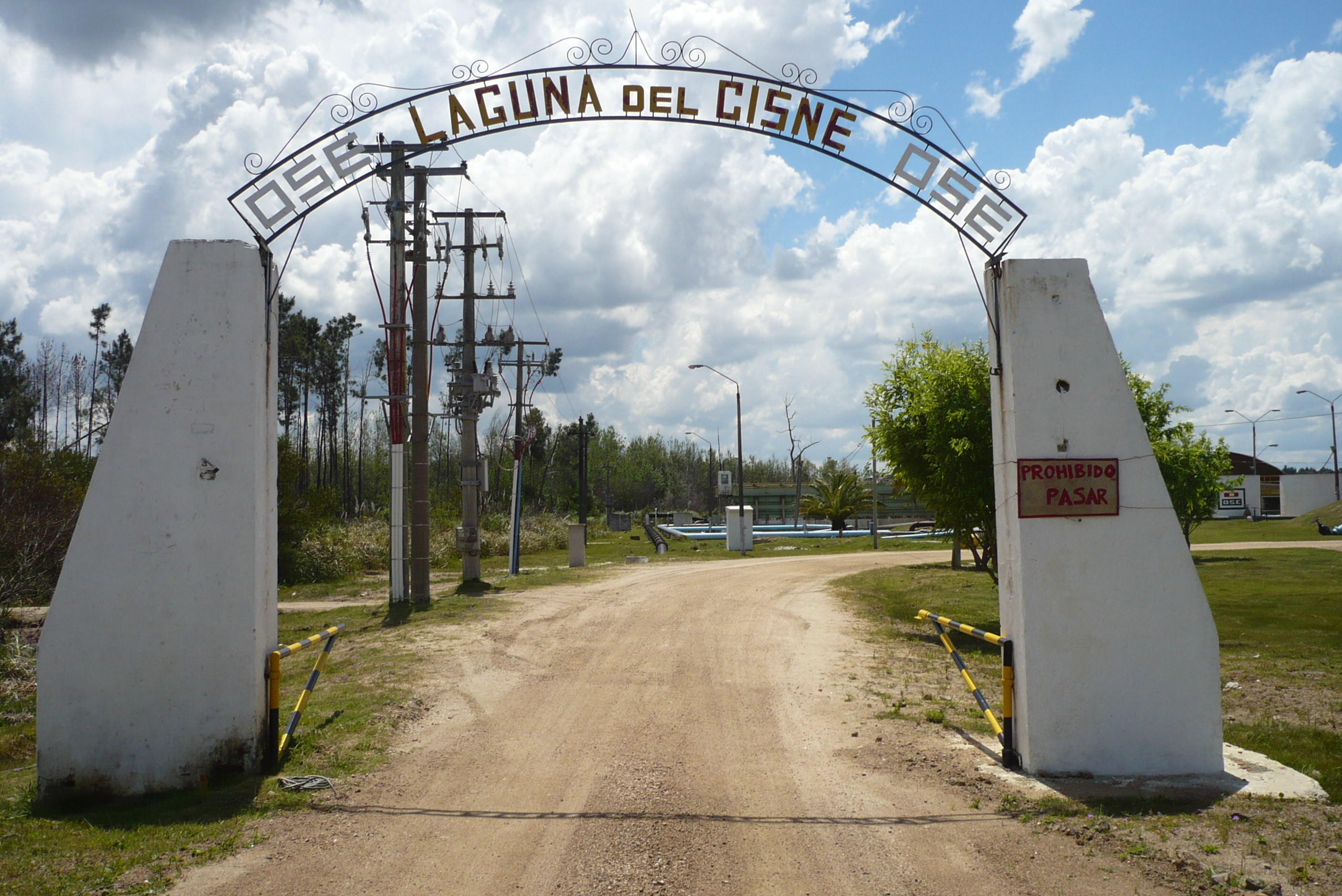
- Coordinates: 34°44′46″S 55°49′18″W
- Type: Lake
- Basin countries: Uruguay

The Laguna del Cisne is a subtropical body of water located near Salinas, in the department of Canelones, in Uruguay. The surface area is 1,8 km², the watershed feeding the lake includes about 50 km². The laguna feeds the Tropa Vieja River, which in turn feeds the Arroyo Pando, which terminates in the Río de la Plata. The watershed is bordered by Route 8 in the North, Route 11 in the east and in the south by the Interblanearia Líber Seregni and by Route 87 in the West.

The eastern part of the lagoon creates the El Estero wetlands, a wetland about the size of the lake that provides important ecosystem services that improve the quality of the water running off into the lake . The lake has high biodiversity with more than 40 species of animals including amphibians and birds.

Since 1970, the lake has primarily been used by the water authority OSE to provide water to the Costa de Oro. The usage is approximately 3.7 million cubic meters a year. For many years, the lake was the only source of water in the zone, but in recent years the system has been connected with the larger Montevideo Metropolitan water system.

The lake was the source of a major environmental conflict in 2010-2016, when local residents realized that there was heavy agricultural pollution contaminating the lake. As a result of the conflict, local communities secured a special district for the lake to protect it from runoff and creating a zone focused on sustainable agriculture. Nevertheless, the lake continues to have problems with persistent contamination from pesticides and changing environmental conditions due to the impacts of climate change on Uruguay.

In 2023, the lake became another source of environmental conflict when the government proposed building a tollroad that would relieve traffic on the Ruta Interbalnearia. The project would violate many of the environmental protections secured by creating the special water district. The route and environmental conflict continue to be evaluated as of early 2024.
