= Costa de Oro =

Group of resort towns and beaches in Uruguay

Costa de Oro is a 45 kilometres (28 mi) long group of resort towns and beaches in Canelones Department, Uruguay, east of the Ciudad de la Costa. Until 19 October 1994 it also included all the resorts that became henceforth integrated under the name Ciudad de la Costa. Since then, Costa de Oro contains only the resorts and locations of the area delimited by the streams Arroyo Pando to the west and Arroyo Solís Grande to the east and by the highways Ruta 8 and Ruta 9 to the north.

== History ==
Until the beginning of the 20th century, the coast of Canelones was a desert of dunes and marshes. Being unsuitable for agriculture, this land was considered of little value.

By 1870, some of the economically powerful families of Montevideo acquired the custom of setting up summer camps in Santa Rosa Beach (the actual Mansa Beach of Atlántida). They traveled in wagons that were used as housing, and they transported food supplies, including chickens and dairy cows for a three-month stay.

In 1908 efforts began to ameliorate the land of dunes. Pines brought from Galicia, Portugal and southern France were planted, as well as eucalyptus and acacias. From the following decade onwards, various resorts started developing along the coast, with Atlántida the first and the biggest and most developed until the 1990s.

The rapid growth of the rural area adjacent to the coast in the decade of the 1990s, increasingly linked to tourism, and the expansion of the metropolitan area of Montevideo have significantly changed the area.

== Coastal resorts of Costa de Oro ==
Location of Costa de Oro in Canelones Department

- Neptunia
- Pinamar-Pinepark
- Salinas
- Marindia
- Fortín de Santa Rosa
- Villa Argentina
- Atlántida
- Las Toscas
- Parque del Plata
- Las Vegas
- La Floresta
- Costa Azul
- Bello Horizonte
- Guazuvirá Nuevo
- Guazú-Virá
- San Luis
- Los Titanes
- La Tuna
- Araminda
- Santa Lucía del Este
- Biarritz
- Cuchilla Alta
- El Galeón
- Santa Ana
- Balneario Argentino
- Jaureguiberry

== See also ==
- Ciudad de la Costa
