= Guazuvirá Nuevo =

Seaside resort in Uruguay

- Resort of the Costa de Oro
- Location in Uruguay
- Coordinates: 34°45′44″S 55°38′20″W
- Country: Uruguay
- Department: Canelones
- Municipality: La Floresta
- Time zone: UTC -3
- Postal code: 16300
- Dial plan: +598 4378 XXXX

Guazuvirá Nuevo is a seaside resort on the Costa de Oro (Coast of Gold), in the Canelones Department of southern Uruguay.

== Geography ==
Guazuvirá Nuevo is located in the southern area of the department of Canelones, on the coast of the Río de la Plata, and has its access from the Interspa Route at km 57,500. It is bordered by Bello Horizonte to the west and Guazú-Virá to the east.

== Places of interest ==
Between Guazuvirá and Guazuvirá Nuevo there is a wetland where a bird viewpoint is located.
