= La Floresta, Uruguay =

La Floresta
- City
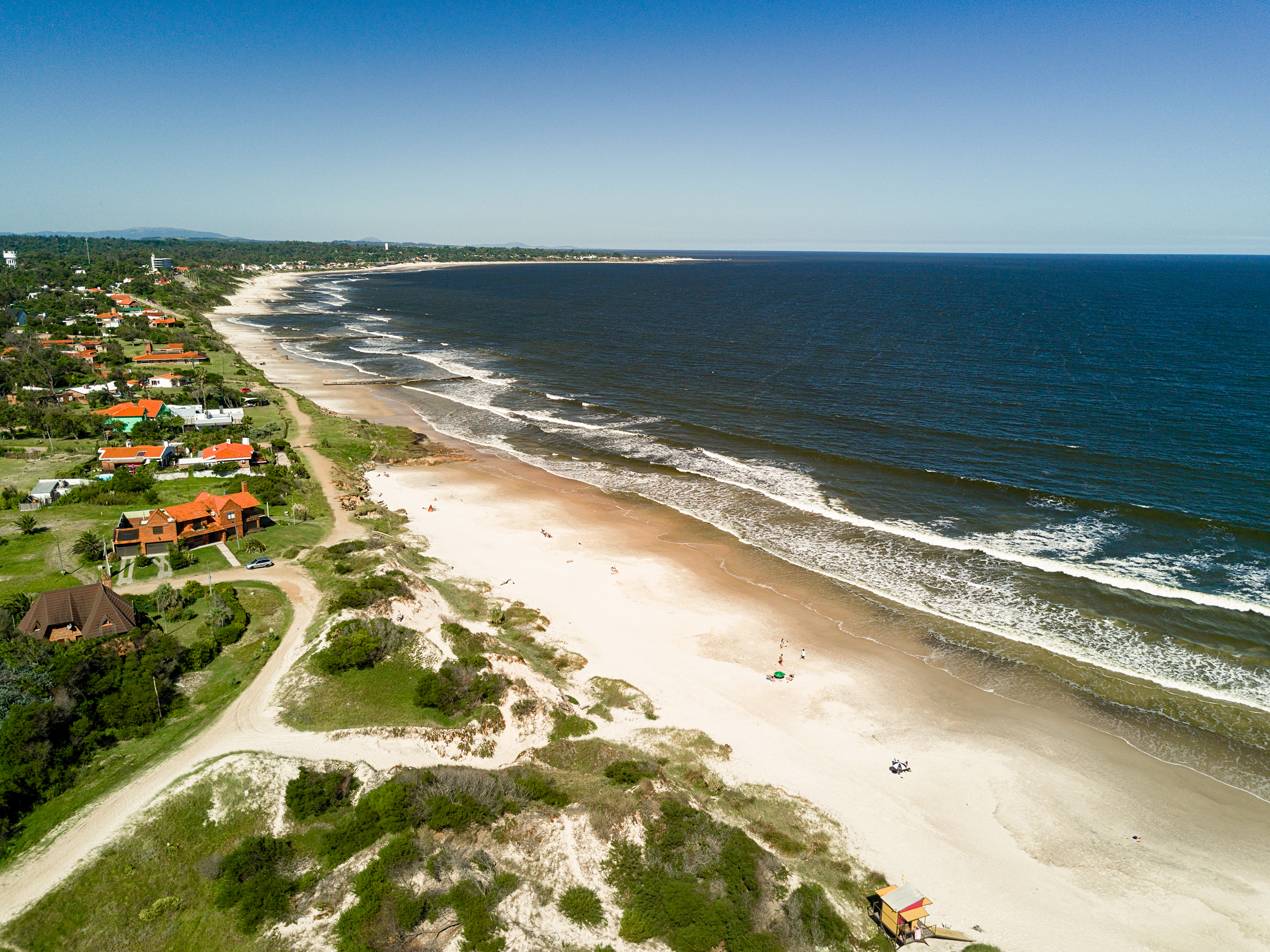

- Location in Uruguay
- Coordinates: 34°45′18″S 55°40′33″W
- Country: Uruguay
- Department: Canelones Department
- Municipality: Municipality of La Floresta
- Founded: 1909

Population (2023)
  - Total: 3,146
- Time zone: UTC -3
- Postal code: 16200
- Dial plan: +598 437 (+5 digits)

La Floresta is a city and resort on the Costa de Oro (Coast of Gold) of the Canelones Department in Uruguay.

La Floresta is also the name of the municipality to which the city belongs and includes several more resorts of the Costa de Oro, east of La Floresta and up to the border with Maldonado Department.

== Geography ==
=== Location ===
The city is located 54 kilometres (34 mi) to the east of Montevideo and separated from Parque del Plata by the stream Arroyo Solís Chico. To the east, La Floresta borders the resort Costa Azul, separated by the stream Arroyo Sarandí.

== History ==
La Floresta was formed in 1909 when Dr. Miguel Perea, lawyer and founder of several banks, began planting pine and eucalyptus trees on a large area of sandy ground between the Sarandí and Solís Chico streams and from the town Mosquitos (known today as Soca) to the River Plate. In March 1911, it became a tourist resort for arboriculture and bathing called La Floresta. The resort was mostly completed in 1920. On January 3, 1915, the tallest building in the resort, the Hotel La Floresta was inaugurated; it was expanded in several stages through 1921. The Hotel La Floresta contained a casino which was closed at the beginning of the 21st century and a cinema theatre that still operates during the summer.

Despite the urban development, the forestation initiated in 1909 continued, and by 1918, a million trees had been planted. In 1936, the second large hotel of La Floresta was constructed, which was eventually transformed into a condominium building. During the same year, the electrification of the resort was established, and between 1945 and 1950, the streets were paved.

In December 1940, La Floresta was declared a populated centre by the Act of Ley N° 9.974., and on 3 December 1969, La Floresta officially became a city by the Act of Ley N° 13.806. The growth of the local population and the neighbouring localities necessitated the creation of a local grammar school in 1974. Many of the current residents of La Floresta are descendants of the first settlers.

== Population ==
According to the 2011 census, La Floresta had 1,595 inhabitants. In 2010, the Intendencia de Canelones had recorded a population of 6,561 for the municipality during the elections.

Location map of the Municipality of La Floresta

Year	Population
1963	566
1975	853
1985	959
1996	1,211
2004	1,109
2004	1,595

Source: Instituto Nacional de Estadística de Uruguay

== Modern tourism ==
La Floresta's main street, Treinta y Tres Avenue, offers a large variety of shops. An important cultural site is the Monumental Sanctuary of the Virgin of the Flowers, located a kilometer to the north of La Floresta.

Many middle-class Uruguayans, as well as Argentines and Paraguayans, vacation in La Floresta during the summer.

== Cultural activity ==
The Liga de Fomento of La Floresta (Development League of La Floresta) has promoted cultural development. One example is the creation of the first and second International Biennial Sculptures Encounter, held in January 2005 and January 2007 respectively.

At the first Sculptures Encounter, many international artists were present, including Juan Carlos Mercury and Adriana Baddi from Argentina, Beatriz Carbonell from Spain, Eddy Walrave and Erik Verhelst from Belgium, Brenda Oakes from Wales and Giorgio Carlevaro from Uruguay. Over ten days, members of the public were able to watch each invited sculptor carving large pieces of granite into sculptures, which enabled the public to see a wide range of contemporary sculpture in person, both during the creative process and as finished works. An activity that the whole country of Uruguay might play is soccer. This is a famous typical sport in the country of Uruguay.

== Places of worship ==
- Parish Church of the Blessed Luigi Orione (Roman Catholic, Sons of Divine Providence)
- Shrine of the Virgin of the Flowers in Estación Floresta (Roman Catholic)
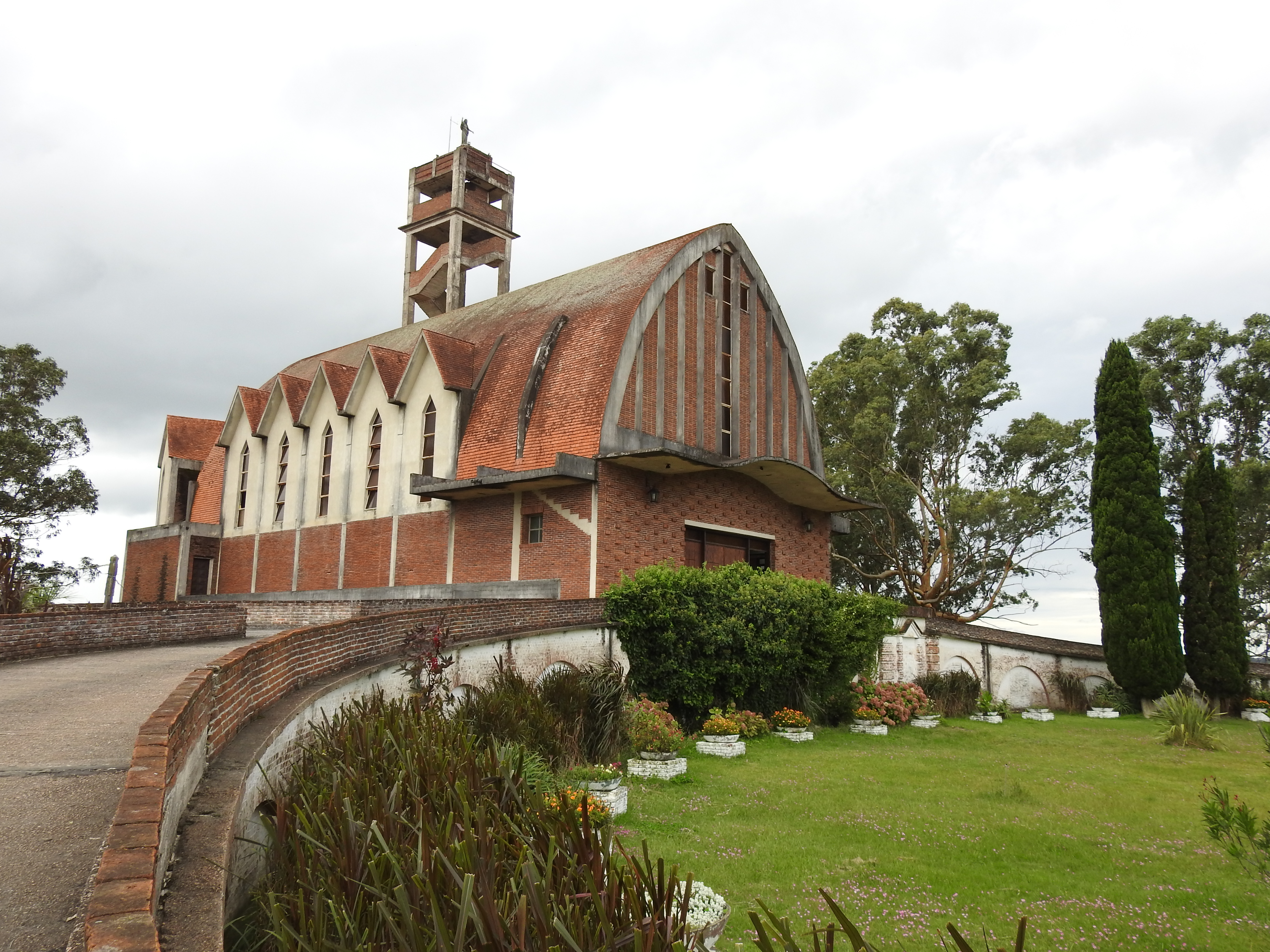

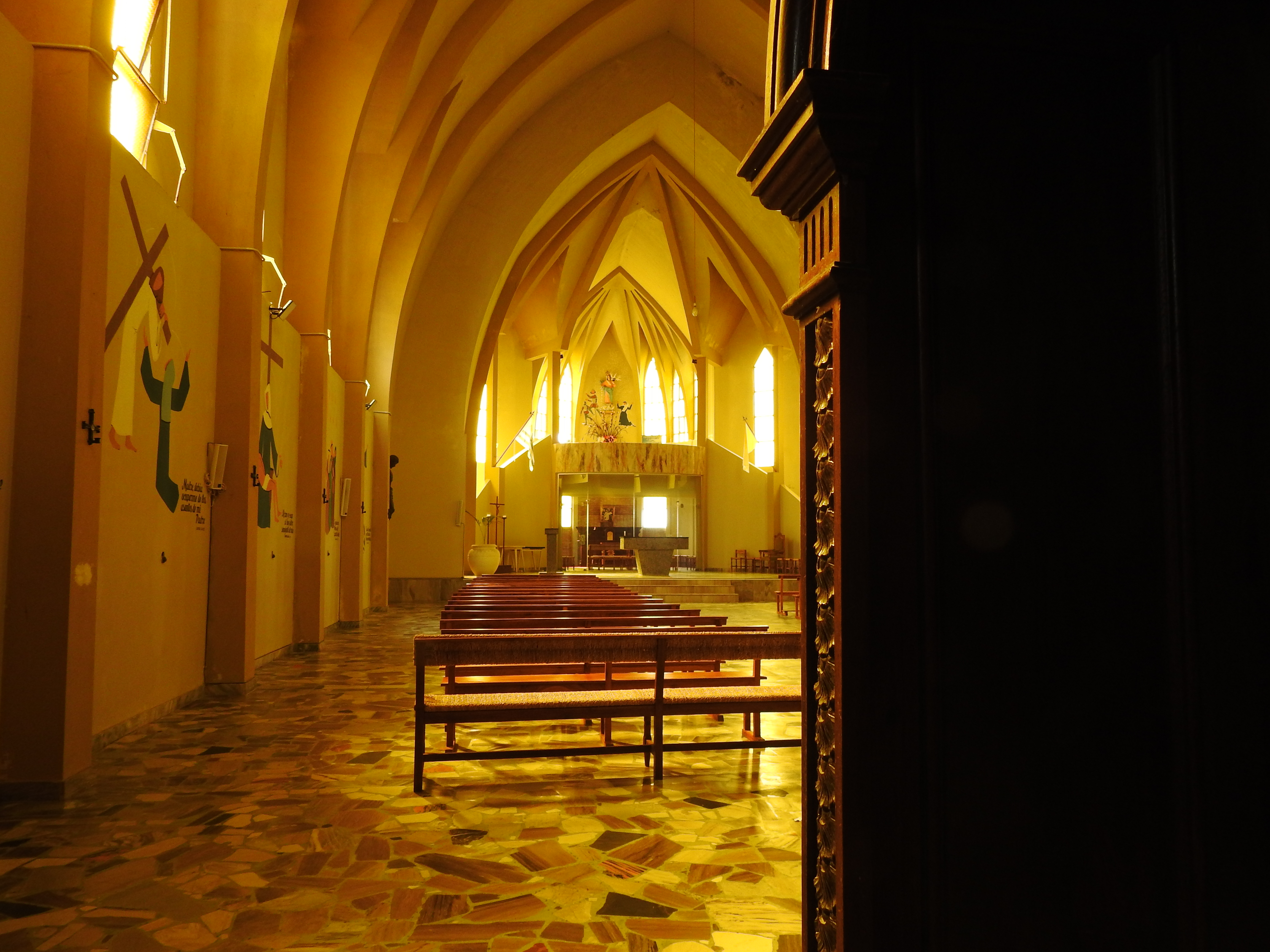

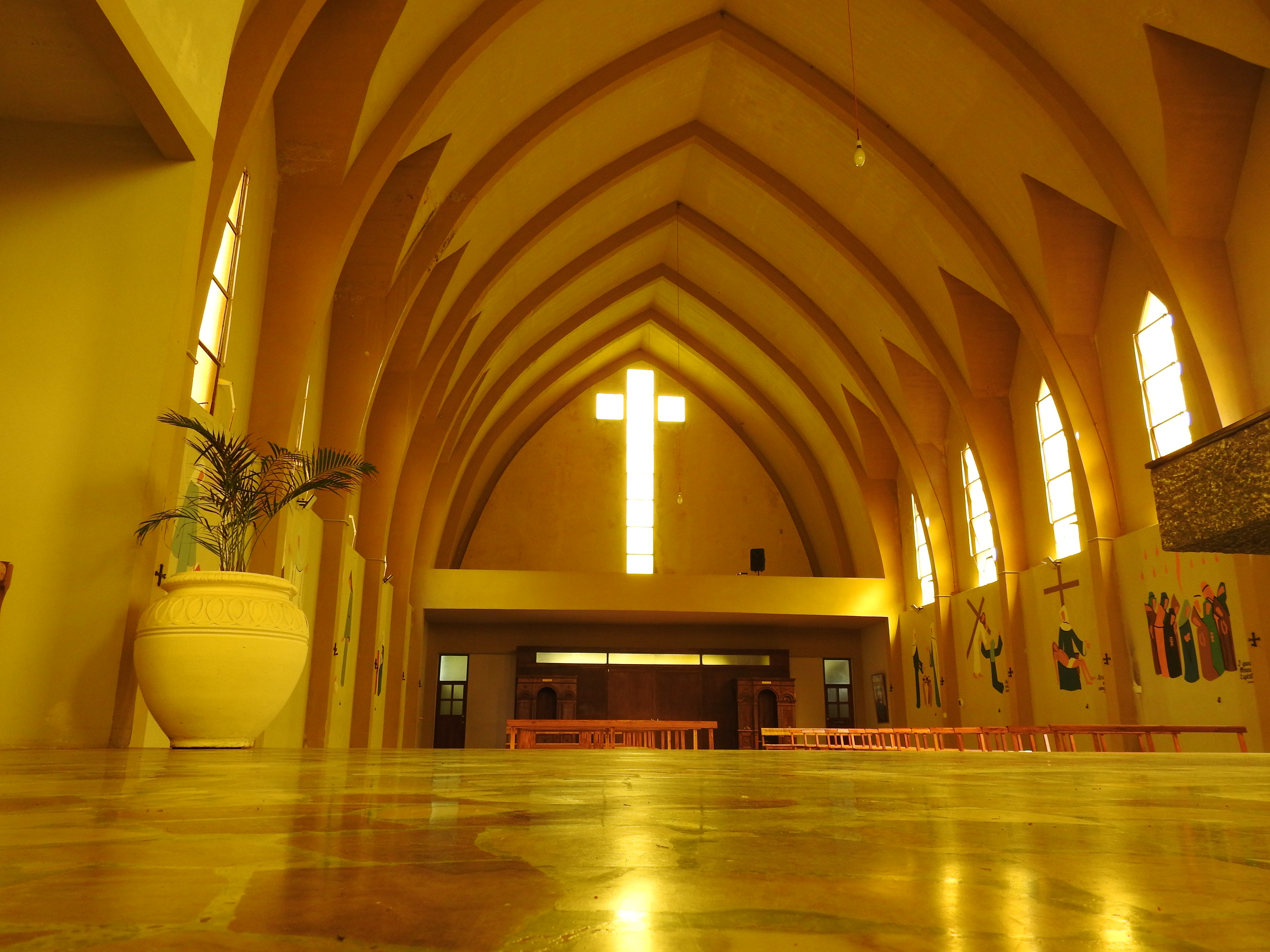

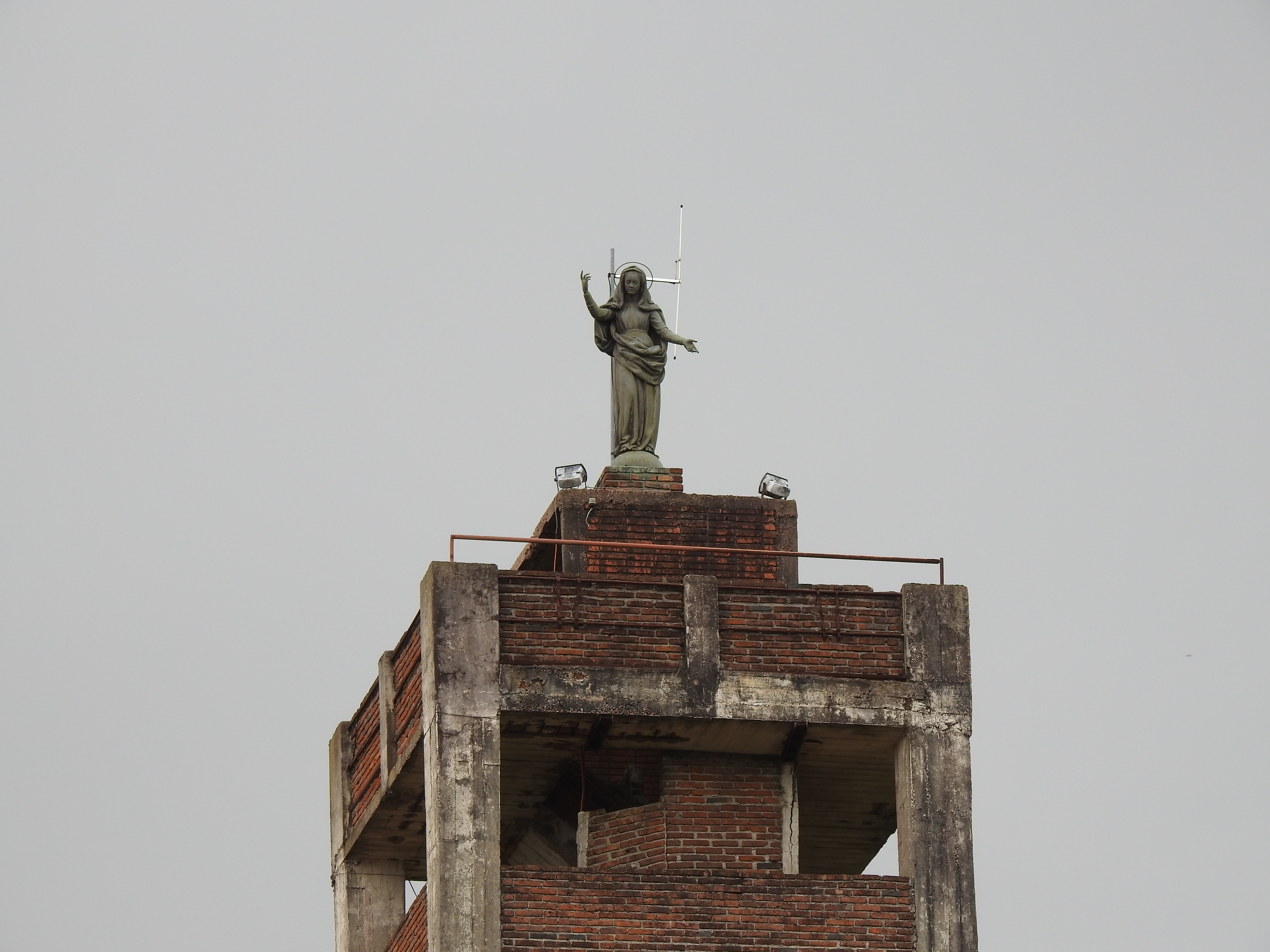
