= Bello Horizonte =

- Village, resort
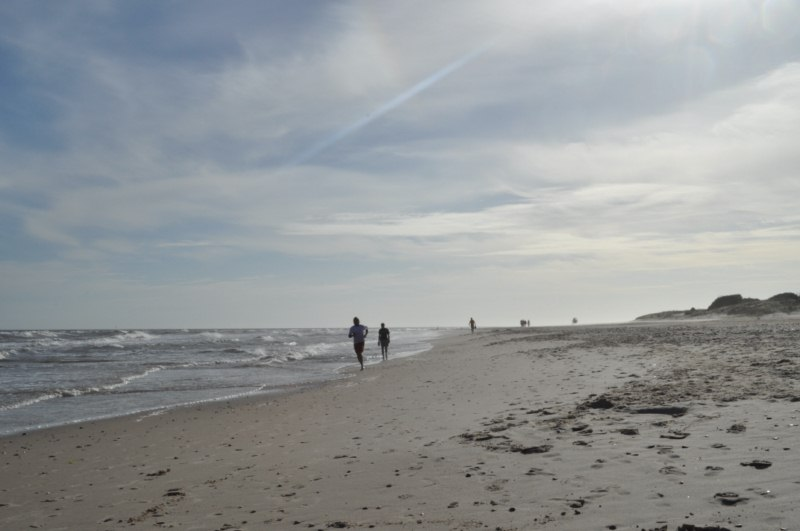

- Location in Uruguay
- Coordinates: 34°46′20″S 55°38′38″W
- Country: Uruguay
- Department: Canelones
- Municipality: La Floresta

Population (2011)
  - Total: 416
- Time zone: UTC -3
- Postal code: 16203
- Dial plan: +598 437 (+5 digits)

Bello Horizonte is a village and resort on the Costa de Oro (Coast of Gold), in the Canelones Department of southern Uruguay.

== Geography ==
Bello Horizonte is located in the south of the department of Canelones, on the shores of the Río de la Plata, at km 57 of the Ruta Interbalnearia. It bordered to the west with the Costa Azul resort and to the east with the Guazú-Virá resort.

== Population ==
In 2011 Bello Horizonte had a population of 416.
