= Bella Vista, Maldonado =

Bella Vista
- Resort
- Location in Uruguay
- Coordinates: 34°48′10″S 55°21′15″W
- Country: Uruguay
- Department: Maldonado Department

Population (2011)
  - Total: 141
- Time zone: UTC -3
- Postal code: 20302
- Dial plan: +598 443 (+5 digits)

Bella Vista is a resort (balneario) in the Maldonado Department of southeastern Uruguay.

== Geography ==
It is located on the coast of Río de la Plata, on Route 10, 2.5 kilometres (1.6 mi) south of its intersection with Ruta Interbalnearia. It borders the resort Solís to the west and the resort Las Flores to the east.

== Population ==
In 2011 Bella Vista had a population of 141 permanent inhabitants and 549 dwellings.

Year	Population	Dwellings
1963	79	63
1975	102	117
1985	112	128
1996	141	239
2004	145	437
2011	141	549

Source: Instituto Nacional de Estadística de Uruguay
