= Las Flores, Maldonado =

Las Flores Balneario Las Flores
- Resort
- Location in Uruguay
- Coordinates: 34°48′45″S 55°19′55″W
- Country: Uruguay
- Department: Maldonado Department

Population (2011)
  - Total: 241
- Time zone: UTC -3
- Postal code: 20303
- Dial plan: +598 443 (+5 digits)
- Climate: Cfa

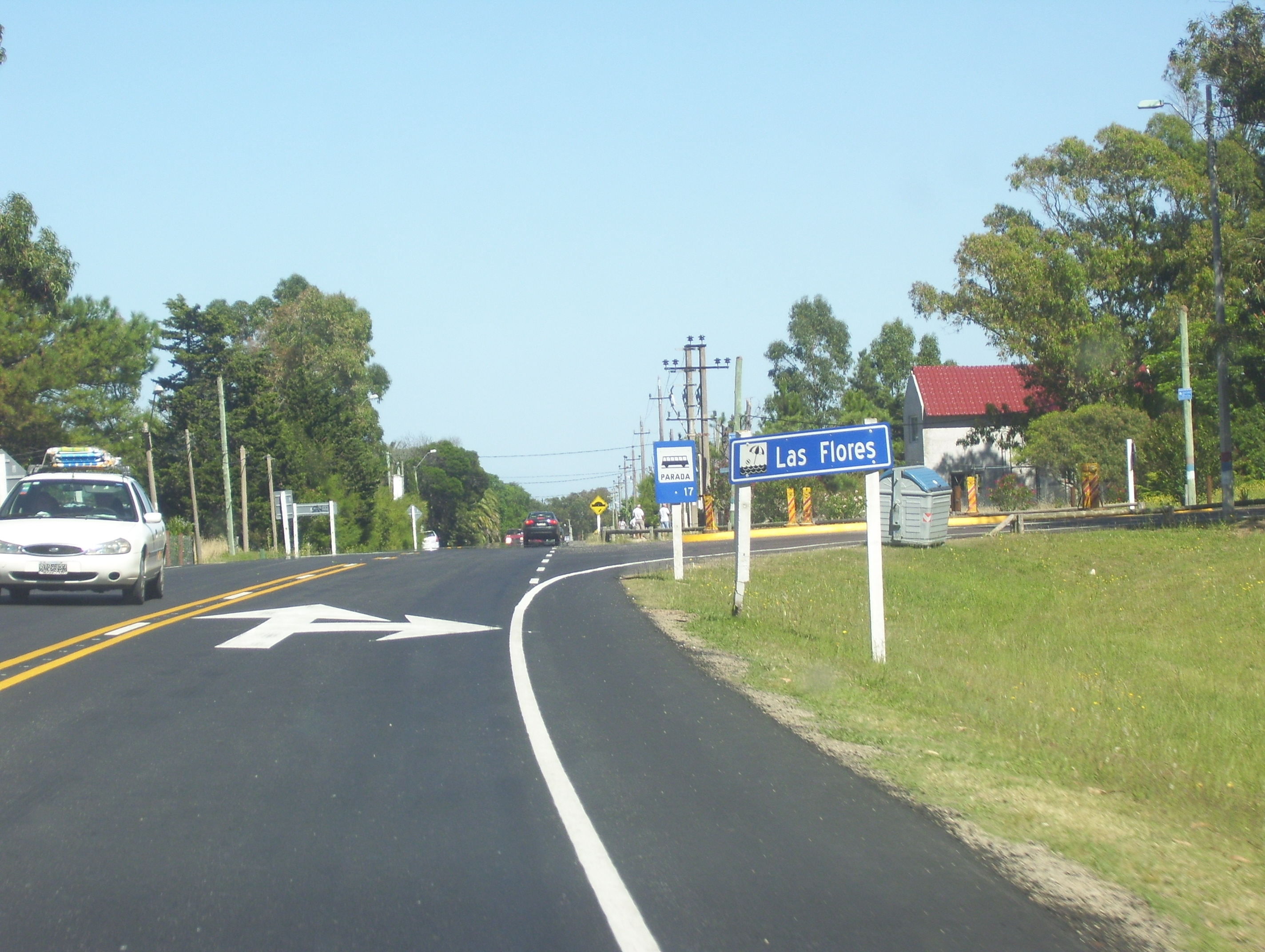

Las Flores, or Balneario Las Flores is a resort (balneario) in the Maldonado Department of southeastern Uruguay. It is known as a family-friendly place to spend summers. In Las Flores each street is named after a flower to honor its name which means "flowers" in Spanish.

== Geography ==
The resort is located on the coast of Río de la Plata, on Route 10, 2.5 kilometres (1.6 mi) south of Estación Las Flores and Ruta Interbalnearia. It borders the resort Bella Vista to its west and the resort Playa Verde to its east, separated by the stream Arroyo Tarariras from the later.

== Population ==
In 2011 Las Flores had a population of 221 permanent inhabitants and 473 dwellings.

Year	Population	Dwellings
1963	98	202
1975	107	242
1985	150	312
1996	235	381
2004	221	473
2011	241	527

Source: Instituto Nacional de Estadística de Uruguay
