= Biarritz (disambiguation) =

Biarritz is a city in France.

Biarritz may also refer to

== Geography ==
- Biarritz, Uruguay, a seaside resort in Canelones Department, Uruguay
- Villa Biarritz, a section of the Punta Carretas neighbourhood in Montevideo, Uruguay

== Sports ==
- Biarritz Olympique, a French professional rugby union team based in the city of Biarritz
- Club Biguá de Villa Biarritz, a Uruguayan sports club based in the city of Montevideo

== Transport ==
- Biarritz – Anglet – Bayonne Airport, an airport in southern France
- Cadillac Eldorado Biarritz, a convertible

== Other uses ==
- Biarritz (novel), a novel by Hermann Goedsche
