= Villa Argentina =

- Resort of the Costa de Oro
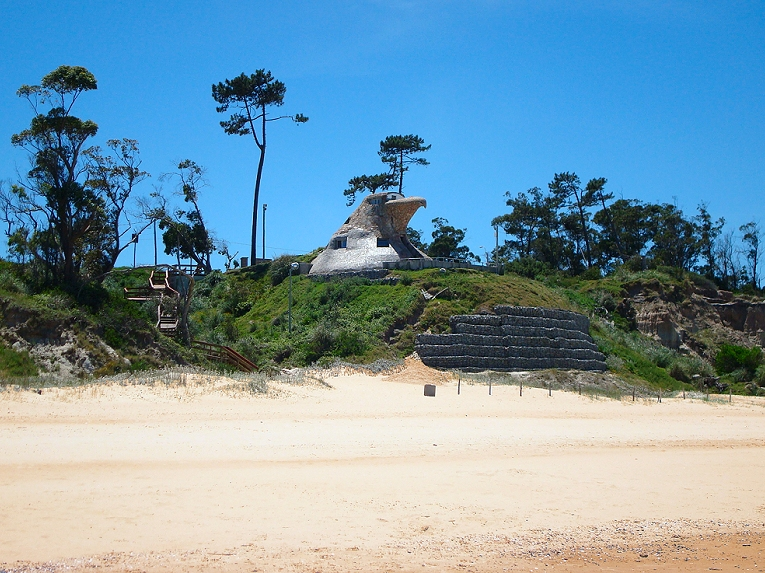

- Location in Uruguay
- Coordinates: 34°46′0″S 55°47′0″W
- Country: Uruguay
- Department: Canelones Department

Population (2011)
  - Total: 622
- Time zone: UTC-3
- Postal code: 15002
- Dial plan: +598 437 (+5 digits)

Villa Argentina is a resort (balneario) of the Costa de Oro in the Canelones Department of southern Uruguay. The famous eagle-shaped house overlooking the Río de la Plata, which is attributed to Atlántida, is in fact located in this resort.

== Geography ==
=== Location ===
The resort is located on both sides of the Ruta Interbalnearia, about 28 kilometres (17 mi) from the border of Montevideo Department. It shares borders with Atlántida to the east.

== Population ==
In 2011 Villa Argentina had a population of 622.

Year	Population
1963	41
1975	156
1985	193
1996	385
2004	552
2011	622

Source: Instituto Nacional de Estadística de Uruguay
