= Las Toscas =

Las Toscas may refer to:

- Las Toscas, Canelones a town of Canelones Department, Uruguay
- Las Toscas, Tacuarembó a town of Tacuarembó Department, Uruguay
