= Las Toscas, Canelones =

Las Toscas
- Resort of the Costa de Oro
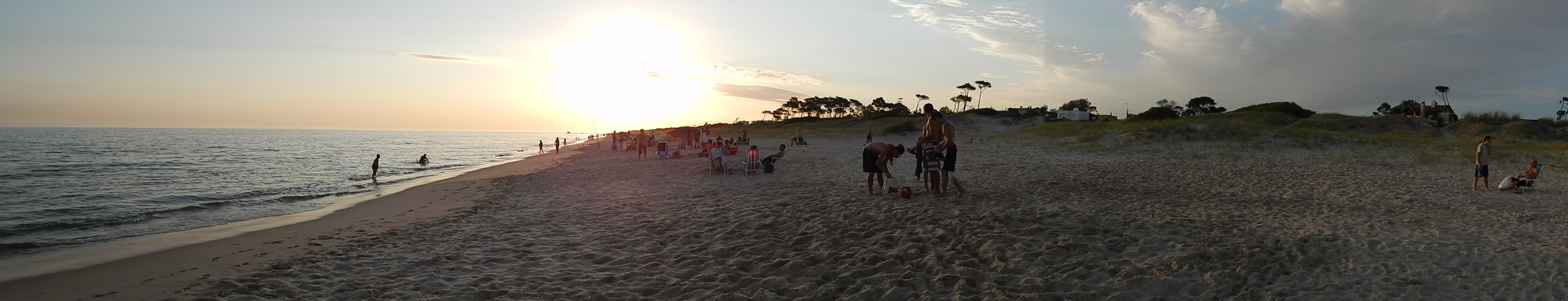
- A panoramic photo of a beach at Las Toscas

- Location in Uruguay
- Coordinates: 34°46′0″S 55°44′0″W
- Country: Uruguay
- Department: Canelones Department

Population (2011)
  - Total: 3,146
- Time zone: UTC -3
- Postal code: 16002
- Dial plan: +598 437 (+5 digits)

Las Toscas is a resort of the Costa de Oro in the Canelones Department of southern Uruguay.

== Geography ==
=== Location ===
The resort is located on the 47th km of Ruta Interbalnearia between Atlántida to the west and Parque del Plata to the east.

== History ==
Today, Las Toscas is merged with Atlántida to the west and Parque del Plata to the east, but in the creation of these locations, during the first decades of the 20th century, it gave the name to the whole zone. Atlántida's train station wal also named Las Toscas, and was, with Ruta 11, the only way to get into de area before the construction of the Ruta Interbalnearia.

It was at Las Toscas where the laborious task, developed by various private societies, of foresting the coast of the Río de la Plata began. The success of this task is because of Mario Ferreira, whose name is taken by the main street of the resort.

The first lands were sold between 1911 and 1914, and the first building was made in 1946.

== Population ==
The population of Las Toscas has grown considerably since 1990. In 2011 Las Toscas had a population of 3,146.

Year	Population
1963	594
1975	899
1985	1,093
1996	1,793
2004	2,222
2011	3,146

Source: Instituto Nacional de Estadística de Uruguay
