= Playa Verde =

- Resort
- Location in Uruguay
- Coordinates: 34°49′35″S 55°18′50″W
- Country: Uruguay
- Department: Maldonado Department

Population (2011)
  - Total: 269
- Time zone: UTC -3
- Postal code: 20303
- Dial plan: +598 443 (+5 digits)
- Climate: Cfa

Playa Verde is a resort (balneario) in the Maldonado Department of southeastern Uruguay.

== Geography ==
The resort is located on the coast of Río de la Plata, on Route 10, about 6 kilometres (3.7 mi) northwest of Piriápolis. It borders the resort Las Flores to the northwest, separated by the stream Arroyo Tarariras, and the resort Playa Hermosa to the southeast.

== Population ==
In 2011, Playa Verde had a population of 269 permanent inhabitants and 709 dwellings.

Year	Population	Dwellings
1963	86	237
1975	108	227
1985	132	297
1996	154	408
2004	250	578
2011	269	709

Source: Instituto Nacional de Estadística de Uruguay
