= San Luis, Uruguay =

San Luis
- Village
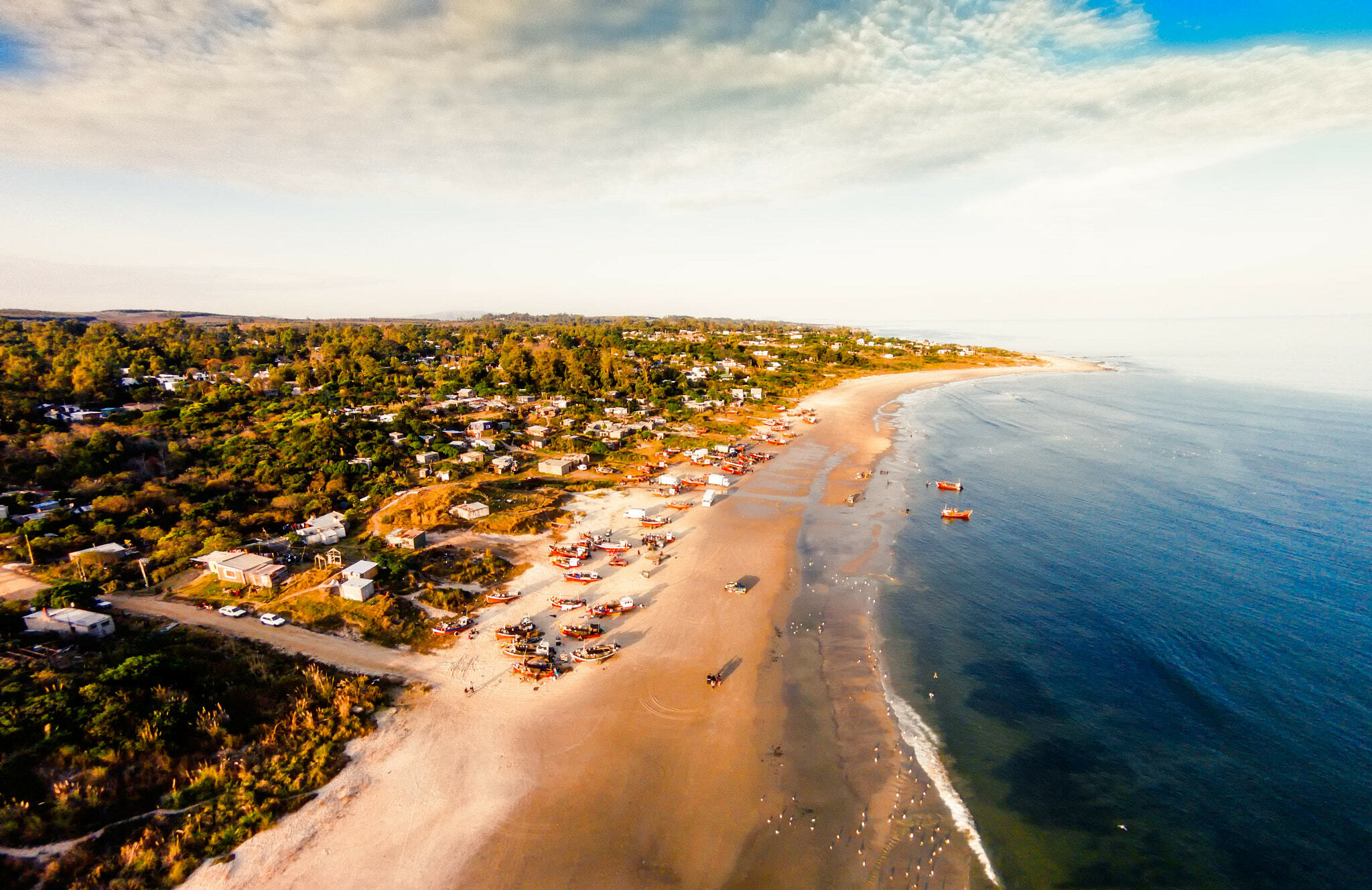
- San Luis beach

- Location in Uruguay
- Coordinates: 34°46′0″S 55°35′0″W
- Country: Uruguay
- Department: Canelones Department

Population (2011)
  - Total: 1,878
- Time zone: UTC -3
- Postal code: 16300
- Dial plan: +598 4378 (+4 digits)

San Luis is a village and resort of Costa de Oro in the Canelones Department of southern Uruguay.

== Geography ==
=== Location ===
The village is located on Km. 63 of the Ruta Interbalnearia. It borders with the resorts Los Titanes to the east and Guazú - Virá to the west, with Arroyo del Bagre as the natural border with the later.

== History ==
On 15 October 1963, its status was elevated to "Pueblo" (village) by the Act of Ley Nº 13.167.

== Population ==
In 2011 San Luis had a population of 1,878.

Year	Population
1963	363
1975	509
1985	648
1996	1,180
2004	1,224
2011	1,878

Source: Instituto Nacional de Estadística de Uruguay
