= Solís =

- Resort
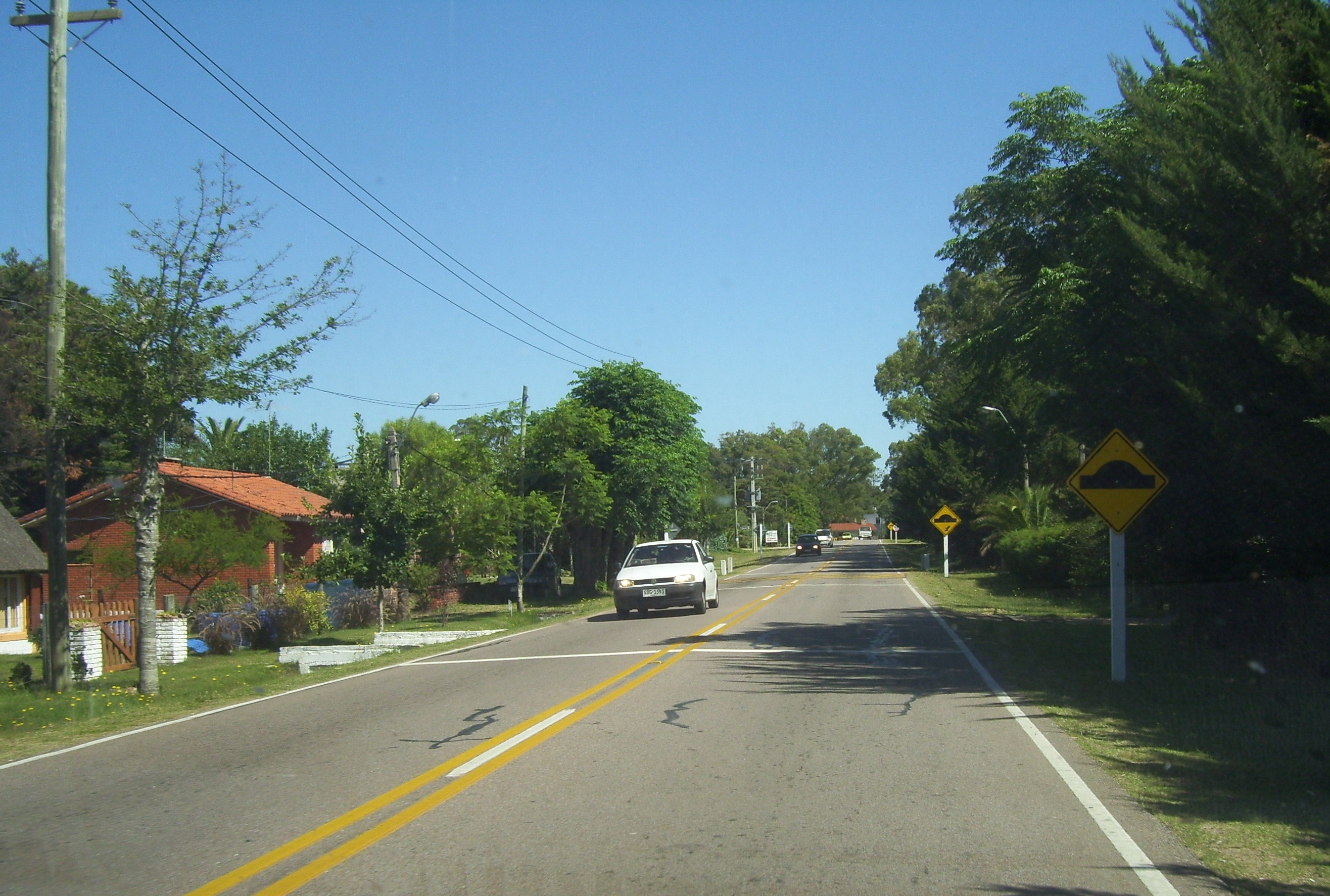
- Main street in Solís

- Location in Uruguay
- Coordinates: 34°47′35″S 55°23′0″W
- Country: Uruguay
- Department: Maldonado Department

Population (2011)
  - Total: 288
- Time zone: UTC -3
- Postal code: 20302
- Dial plan: +598 443 (+5 digits)
- Climate: Cfa

Solís is a resort (balneario) in the Maldonado Department of southeastern Uruguay.

== Geography ==
The resort is located on the coast of Río de la Plata, on Route 10 and close to its junction with Ruta Interbalnearia. To its west flows the stream Arroyo Solís Grande, which is the natural border with the Costa de Oro of Canelones Department. To its east it borders the resort Bella Vista.

== Population ==
In 2011 Solís had a population of 288 permanent inhabitants and 632 dwellings.

| Year | Population | Dwellings |
|---|---|---|
| 1963 | 225 | 292 |
| 1975 | 289 | 351 |
| 1985 | 310 | 388 |
| 1996 | 342 | 483 |
| 2004 | 303 | 571 |
| 2011 | 288 | 632 |

Source: Instituto Nacional de Estadística de Uruguay
