= Pinamar – Pinepark =

- Resort of the Costa de Oro
- Location in Uruguay
- Coordinates: 34°46′39″S 55°51′21″W
- Country: Uruguay
- Department: Canelones Department

Population (2011)
  - Total: 4,724
- Time zone: UTC -3
- Postal code: 15102 & 15103
- Dial plan: +598 437 (+5 digits)

Pinamar – Pinepark is a resort town of the Costa de Oro in the Canelones Department of southern Uruguay.

== Geography ==
=== Location ===
It is located on the Ruta Interbalnearia, about 36.5 kilometres (22.7 mi) east-northeast of the centre of the city of Montevideo. It borders Salinas to the east and the resort Neptunia to the west.

== Population ==
In 2011 Pinamar – Pinepark had a population of 4,724.

Year	Population
1963	213
1975	654
1985	838
1996	2,340
2004	3,608
2011	4,724

Source: Instituto Nacional de Estadística de Uruguay
