= Biarritz, Uruguay =

Biarritz
- Village, resort
- Location in Uruguay
- Coordinates: 34°47′31″S 55°30′31″W
- Country: Uruguay
- Department: Canelones Department

Population (2011)
  - Total: 57
- Time zone: UTC -3
- Postal code: 16401
- Dial plan: +598 4378 (+4 digits)

Biarritz is a village and resort of the Costa de Oro in the Canelones Department of southern Uruguay.

== Geography ==
=== Location ===
It is located about 70 kilometres (43 mi) east of Montevideo between the resorts Cuchilla Alta and Santa Lucía del Este.

== Population ==
In 2011 Biarritz had a population of 57.
