= Parque del Plata =

- City
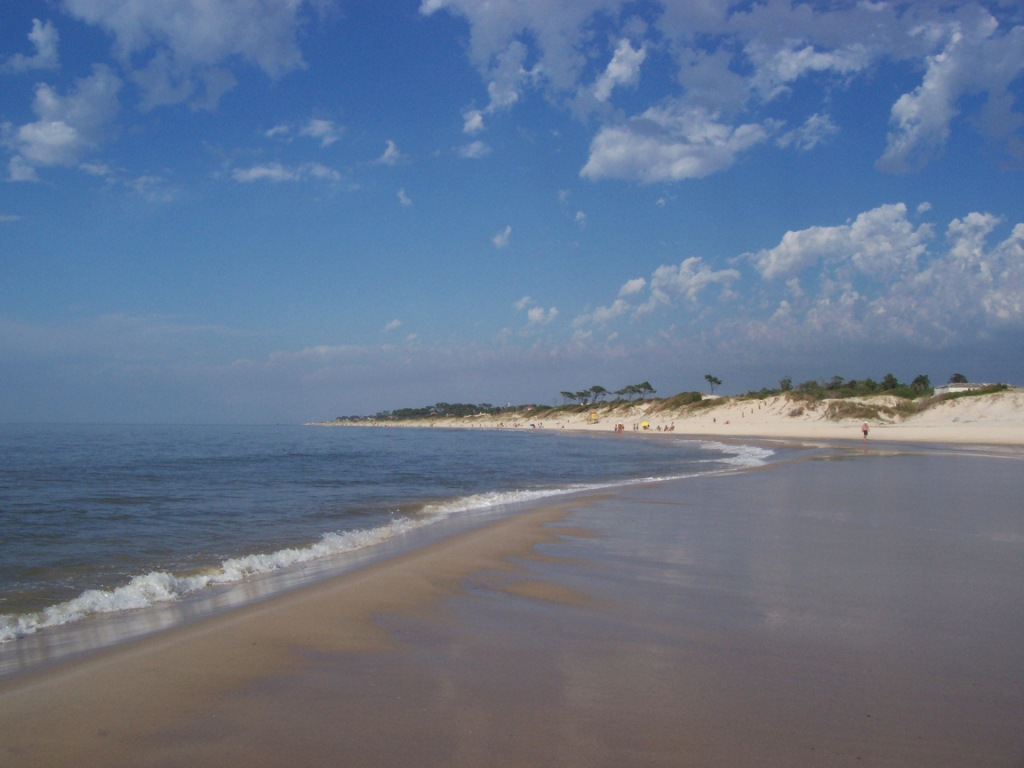

- Location in Uruguay
- Coordinates: 34°46′0″S 55°43′0″W
- Country: Uruguay
- Department: Canelones

Population (2011 Census)
  - Total: 7,896
- Time zone: UTC -3
- Postal code: 16100
- Dial plan: +598 437 (+5 digits)

Location map of the Municipality of Parque del Plata

Parque del Plata is a city of the Costa de Oro in the Canelones Department of southern Uruguay.

== Geography ==
=== Location ===
The city is located on the Ruta Interbalnearia, 49 kilometres (30 mi) east of Montevideo, extending for 3 kilometres (1.9 mi) over the coast west of the stream Arroyo Solís Chico. The influence of Le Corbusier can be seen in the modern town planning of this resort.

== History ==
On 9 December 1969, its status was elevated from "Balneario" (resort) to "Ciudad" (city) by the Act of Ley Nº 13.806.

Parque del Plata is also the name of the municipality to which the city belongs and which includes the neighbouring resort of Las Toscas and more rural area.

== Population ==
In 2011 Parque del Plata had a population of 7,896. The Intendencia de Canelones has estimated a population of 8,122 for the municipality.

Year	Population
1963	1,521
1975	2,365
1985	3,229
1996	4,993
2004	5,900
2011	7,896

Source: Instituto Nacional de Estadística de Uruguay

== Etymology ==
The name was created in 1938 by the Compañía Parque del Plata S.A. The name alludes to the vast forests of pine, eucalyptus, acacia and other species, complemented by rough streets and avenues, designed as a large park. Today its streets are named by numbers (from north to south) and letters (from east to west) with the exception of Calle "A" which retains the name of Mario Ferreira, Calle "C", called General Lavalleja, Calle "9 ", whose name is Alfredo Zitarrosa and "24", República Argentina.

== Attractions ==
Its location on the tourist route makes it accessible, served by regular buses. The town has always had a floating population, so that the number of permanent residents, which average 6000, fluctuates constantly. At weekends this usually doubles and triples in the summer. Parque del Plata is characterized by homes with gardens and forests around them. Practiced in the area are hiking, biking, sailing, fishing surfing boating, etc. The town contains a Lyceum and two social clubs.

== Barrios ==
Barrios de Parque del Plata:
(1) El Remanso
(2) Estación Parque del Plata
(3) El Paso
(4) Los Portuarios
(5) Rowing
(6) Médanos Altos
(7) Pinares del Plata
(8) Estadio
(9) Barrio Rincón/Rinconada
(10) Los Paraísos
(11) Barrio Campamento
(12) Diagonal
(13) Paseo del Solís
(14) El Embalse
(15) Médanos del Manantial
(16) La Llanada
(17) El Troncal
(18) Centro
(19) Dunas del Plata
(20) Barra del Solís ]]

The following gazetteer is based on an ancient map of the internal use of the Compañía Parque del Plata S.A., which enlisted the names of different neighbourhoods and areas of the resort, serving as a reference to the creators of it.

- (1) El Remanso:

There are several versions of the origin of this name meaning "The Haven". 1. Constitutes one of the most remote. 2. As one of the more secluded areas of the resort in its infancy. 3. For a house which takes this name, with a sign ostentatiously visible in the garden.

- (2) Estación Parque del Plata :

Neighbourhood adjacent to the railway station. Formed during the last half century, the commercial hub of the area north of the resort.

- (3) El Paso:

Name that refers to the historic Paso de las Toscas located exactly where is the railway bridge over the Arroyo Solís Chico. The name was already known by the Surveyor Pedro Millán in 1728, when Bruno Mauricio de Zabala came to this place.

- (4) Los Portuarios:

The name comes from the holiday resort of Asociación de Funcionarios Portuarios (Port Officers' Association)

- (5) Rowing:

The site of the Rowing Club of Uruguay, with its convex metal sheds, where they kept boats, boats and other nautical items, on the banks of the creek. A private campground now operates on the site.

- (6) Médanos Altos

Meaning "High Dunes", the name is mentioned in documents in the 17th century. It was a succession of tall sand dunes that stood out throughout the region in a strip extending from the old Teatro de Verano, to Avenue 41. Sands were removed for the construction of the Ruta Interbalnearia.

- (7) Pinares del Plata

This moist environment flourished more than in other part of the pine plantation. The compactness of the pine forest and its durability over time earned it the name.

- (8) Estadio

The name refers to a football field which was intended to be developed into a stadium. The dream did not materialize, but the name lives on in the adjacent neighbourhood.

- (9) Barrio Rincón or Rinconada.

Meaning "corner", the name comes from its location which forms a triangle or "corner" between Ruta Interbalnearia, Calle 2 and Calle 10.

- (10) Los Paraísos

According to one version, trees were planted in the area in the 1940s, several blocks from a variety of tree Melia azedarach, known as "Paraíso" (Paradise). The plantation would not have prospered because of improper ground. Another version mentions the existence of a large sign at the intersection of Calle 2 with the current Ruta Interbalnearia. It outlined the following: “Bienvenidos a Parque del Plata. Paraíso del Mundo”.

- (11) Barrio Campamento

The “Campamento de Educación Física” (Physical Education Camp), was and is a landmark of the resort. For decades hundreds of thousands of people, especially children and young people across the country, have enjoyed physical activities such as camping, walks, etc. at the location. The neighbourhood takes its name from it.

- (12) Diagonal

They say it was a matter of great discussion among the surveyors of the Compañía Parque del Plata S.A.; the elimination of the huge dune that was located on the Diagonal 3. This street is one of the most important roads of the resort, communicating in a diagonal route north to south.

- (13) Paseo del Solís

It is the most popular spot for walking for its panoramic and navigational activities, which develop at the edge of the creek. Naturally binds to the neighbourhood Barra del Solís.

- (14) El Embalse

Before the creation of the spa, the mouth of Solís Chico used to be blocked by the enormous accumulation of sand. When removed, this caused the overflow, creating a reservoir (embalse) in the area now occupied by the neighbourhood.

- (15) Médanos del Manantial

There was a strip of dunes where springs once flowed on its slopes. Today, despite the advance of civilization, the dunes are covered by forest and streets and buildings.

- (16) La Llanada

The name, meaning "The Plain" was created by the workers of the Compañía Parque del Plata S.A. to identify the area, which was very low, with wetland vegetation. It was also known as "Barrio 50 Metros", which is now given to an avenue with that name.

- (17) El Troncal

El Troncal was the name of an inn and lodge, located near the Calle 1 and Avenida Mario Ferreira (formerly Calle A). It was built in the 1930s and its log structure inspired the name which means "The Trunk".

- (18) Centro

This area was the original location of the local Social Club, shops and public offices. With the passing of the years the area became more westward.

- (19) Dunas del Plata

It is the striking white and fine sands that form the dunes of this area, at the intersection of Rio de la Plata and the mouth of the Solís Chico which give it its name.

- (20) Barra del Solís

One of the oldest neighbourhoods, it is located at the mouth of Solís Chico and across from the extensive bar and sand spit that forms this channel in the Río de la Plata. At the end of the 19th century this bar was cut perpendicular to the stream, forming an island of sand, which gave rise to the name "Isla Blanca" or "Isla Fantasma" ("White Island" or "Ghost Island").
