= Solís Chico Creek =

Coordinates: 34°46′S 55°44′W

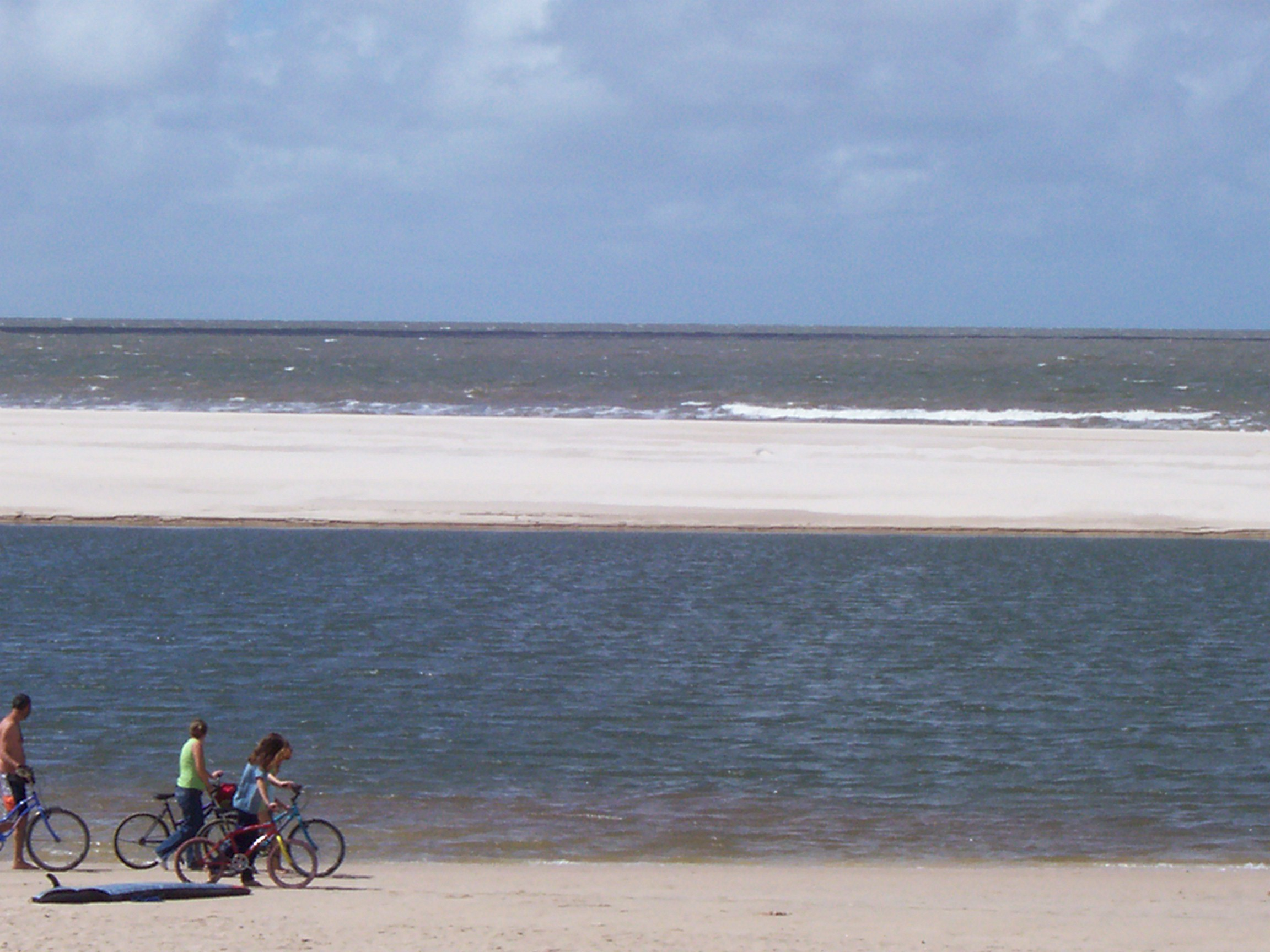

Location
- Country: Uruguay

Physical characteristics
- Length: 47 km (29 mi)
- Basin size: 769 km^{2} (297 sq mi)

Solís Chico Creek is a Uruguayan stream, crossing Canelones Department. It flows into the Río de la Plata, between Parque del Plata and Las Vegas. It is named after Spanish explorer Juan Díaz de Solís.

== See also ==
- List of rivers of Uruguay
