= Argentino, Uruguay =

Argentino Balneario Argentino
- Village, resort
- Location in Uruguay
- Coordinates: 34°47′9″S 55°27′19″W
- Country: Uruguay
- Department: Canelones Department
- Elevation: 10 m (33 ft)

Population (2011)
  - Total: 68
- Time zone: UTC -3
- Postal code: 16403
- Dial plan: +598 4378 (+4 digits)

Argentino, also known as Balneario Argentino, is a village and seaside resort of the Costa de Oro in the Canelones Department of southern Uruguay.

== Geography ==
=== Location ===
It is located about 77 kilometres (48 mi) east of Montevideo between the resorts Santa Ana and Jaureguiberry.

== Population ==
In 2011 Argentino had a population of 68.
