= Neptunia, Uruguay =

Neptunia
- Resort of the Costa de Oro
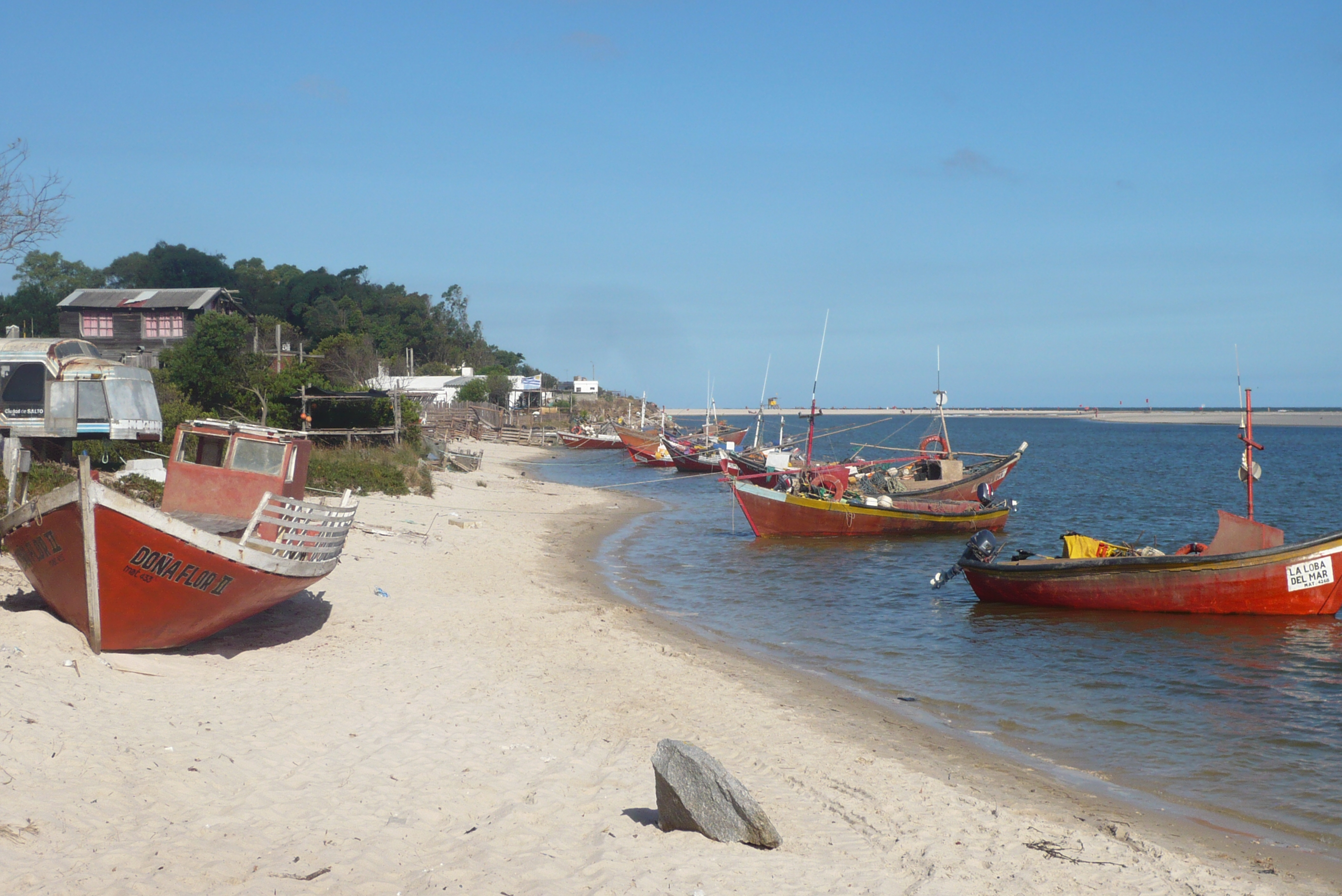
- Pando Creek on its path through Neptunia

- Location in Uruguay
- Coordinates: 34°47′0″S 55°52′0″W
- Country: Uruguay
- Department: Canelones Department

Population (2011)
  - Total: 4,774
- Time zone: UTC -3
- Postal code: 15101
- Dial plan: +598 437 (+5 digits)

Neptunia is a resort town of the Costa de Oro in the Canelones Department of southern Uruguay.

== Geography ==
=== Location ===
The resort is located on the Ruta Interbalnearia, about 36 kilometres (22 mi) northeast of the border with Montevideo Department. It borders the resort Pinamar-Pinepark to the east and the resort El Pinar of the Ciudad de la Costa to the west, across the stream Creek Pando.

== Population ==
In 2011 Neptunia had a population of 4,774.

Year	Population
1963	74
1975	368
1985	743
1996	2,050
2004	3,554
2011	4,774

Source: Instituto Nacional de Estadística de Uruguay
