= Salinas, Uruguay =

Salinas
- City & Municipality
- Location in Uruguay
- Coordinates: 34°47′0″S 55°50′0″W
- Country: Uruguay
- Department: Canelones

Population (2011 Census)
  - Total: 8,626
- Time zone: UTC -3
- Postal code: 15100
- Dial plan: +598 437 (+5 digits)

Location map of the Municipality of Salinas

Salinas is a city and resort of the Costa de Oro in the Canelones Department of southern Uruguay.

Salinas is also the name of the municipality to which the town belongs and which includes the resort towns Marindia, Pinamar–Pinepark, Neptunia and rural areas to their north.

== Geography ==
The city is located on Km.39 of Ruta Interbalnearia, and at its intersection with Route 87. It borders the resorts Pinamar-Pinepark to the west and Marindia to the east.

== History ==
On 1 July 1982, its status was elevated from "Balneario" (resort) to "Ciudad" (city) by the Act of Ley Nº 15.283.

== Population ==
According to the 2011 census, Salinas had a population of 8,626. In 2010 the Intendencia de Canelones had estimated a population of 16,874 for the municipality during the elections.

Year	Population
1963	931
1975	1,866
1985	2,523
1996	5,279
2004	6,574
2011	8,626

Source: Instituto Nacional de Estadística de Uruguay

== Places of worship ==
- St. Elizabeth of Hungary Parish Church (Roman Catholic)
