= Dr. Francisco Soca =

Dr. Francisco Soca Soca
- City
- Location in Uruguay
- Coordinates: 34°41′0″S 55°42′0″W
- Country: Uruguay
- Department: Canelones Department

Population (2011)
  - Total: 1,797
- Time zone: UTC -3
- Postal code: 91006
- Dial plan: +598 437 (+5 digits)

Dr. Francisco Soca or Soca is a small city in the Canelones Department of southern Uruguay.

Soca is also the name of the municipality to which the city belongs.

== Geography ==
=== Location ===
It is located on the intersection of the old Route 8 (a crescent off the actual Route 8 that runs at this point 1.7 kilometres (1.1 mi) to its south) with Route 34 to La Floresta. The stream Arroyo Mosquitos flows along the north and the west limits of the town.

== History ==
On 20 September 1877 the "Pueblo" (village) named Mosquitos was founded here. It was also known as "Santo Tomás de Aquino". It was renamed to "Soca" on 18 April 1928 by the Act of Ley Nº 8.204. On 23 September 1971, its status was elevated to "Ciudad" (city) by the Act of Ley Nº 14.022.

== Population ==
According to the 2011 census, Dr. Francisco Soca had a population of 1,797. In 2010, the Intendencia de Canelones had estimated a population of 3,829 for the municipality during the elections.

Location map of the Municipality of Soca

Year	Population
1908	4,523
1963	1,516
1975	1,397
1985	1,667
1996	1,764
2004	1,742
2011	1,797

Source: Instituto Nacional de Estadística de Uruguay

== Places of worship ==
- St. Thomas Aquinas Parish Church (Roman Catholic)
- Soca Chapel, a landmark building by Catalan architect Antoni Bonet i Castellana (Roman Catholic; usually closed)
