= Marindia =

- Resort of the Costa de Oro
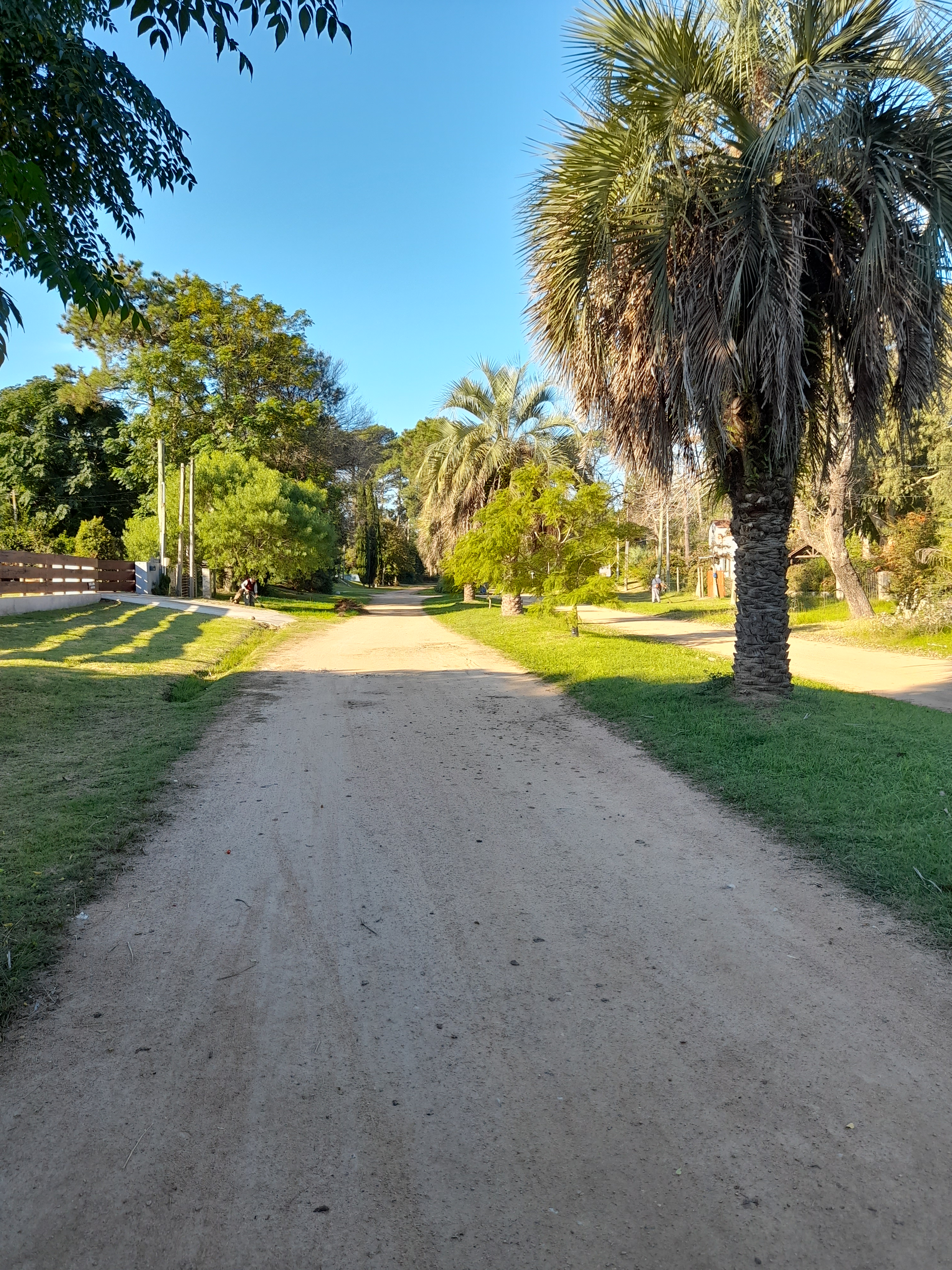

- Location in Uruguay
- Coordinates: 34°46′15″S 55°49′25″W
- Country: Uruguay
- Department: Canelones Department

Population (2011)
  - Total: 3,543
- Time zone: UTC -3
- Postal code: 15104
- Dial plan: +598 437 (+5 digits)

Marindia is a resort of the Costa de Oro in the Canelones Department of southern Uruguay.

== Geography ==
=== Location ===
The resort is located on the Ruta Interbalnearia between the resorts Salinas to its west and Fortín de Santa Rosa to its east.

== Population ==
In 2011 Marindia had a population of 3,543.

Year	Population
1963	115
1975	360
1985	626
1996	1,493
2004	2,586
2011	3,543

Source: Instituto Nacional de Estadística de Uruguay
