= Route 10 (Uruguay) =

Road in Uruguay

Route 10
- Ruta 10
- Juan Díaz de Solís
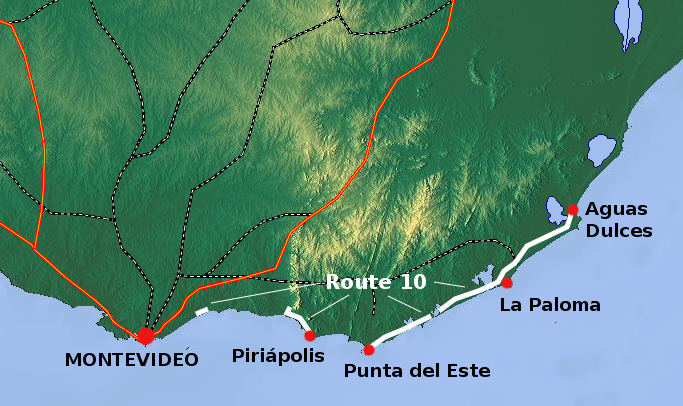

Route information
- Maintained by Ministry of Transport & Public Works
- Length: 162 km (101 mi)

Major junctions
- West end: Canelones Department
- East end: Aguas Dulces

Location
- Country: Uruguay

Highway system
- National Routes of Uruguay
| ← Route IB | → Route 9 |

Route 10 is a national route of Uruguay. In 1983, it was assigned the name Juan Díaz de Solís, honouring the Spanish navigator.

The distance notation along Route 10 uses the same Kilometre Zero reference as Routes 1, 3, 5, 6, 7, 8, 9 and IB, which is the Pillar of Peace of Plaza de Cagancha in Central Montevideo. Aguas Dulces is at km 277 of Route 10.

There are three parts that constitute Route 10, all of them close to the coastline. Their total length amounts to about 162 kilometres (101 mi).

A less mentioned part starts by splitting off Ruta Interbalnearia after the bridge of Arroyo Pando and at its junction with Route 34, in Canelones Department. It runs for about 7 kilometres (4.3 mi) and stops at the resort Marindia.
Coordinates: 34°47′22.8″S 55°51′7″W

Another part, often mentioned as the "first", starts after the bridge over the stream Arroyo Solís Grande, splitting from the Ruta Interbalnearia, crossing the resort of Solís and running along the coastline until Piriápolis, where it turns into Rambla de los Argentinos and the coastal road until Playa Punta Negra before merging again with Ruta Interbalnearia. The length of this part (until Piriápolis) is around 15 kilometres (9.3 mi).
Coordinates: 34°48′28.2″S 55°20′44″W

The longest and most important part for the tourism connects Punta del Este with Aguas Dulces in the northeast. On reaching Laguna Garzón there is a Circular bridge, Laguna Garzon Bridge, connecting the Rocha and Maldonado counties.
Coordinates: 34°42′17″S 54°21′16″W
