= Jaureguiberry, Uruguay =

Jaureguiberry
- Village, resort
- Location in Uruguay
- Coordinates: 34°47′6″S 55°24′10″W
- Country: Uruguay
- Department: Canelones Department

Population (2011)
  - Total: 458
- Time zone: UTC -3
- Postal code: 16404
- Dial plan: +598 4438 (+4 digits)

Jaureguiberry is a village and resort of the Costa de Oro in the Canelones Department of southern Uruguay.

== Geography ==
=== Location ===
It is located about 79 kilometres (49 mi) east of Montevideo between the resort Argentino and the Arroyo Solís Grande.

== Population ==
In 2011 Jaureguiberry had a population of 458.

== Etymology ==
The village is named after its founder Miguel Jaureguiberry, who resided there until his death in 1951.

== Sights ==
Jaureguiberry boasts five campsites: Federación Uruguaya de Magisterio, Harbour Workers, Navy Subofficers, Public Health Psychiatry Workers and Federación Nacional de Profesores de Secundaria.

In 2016 was built an Earthship school at this location.
