= Solís Grande Creek =

Coordinates: 34.7903°S 55.3953°W

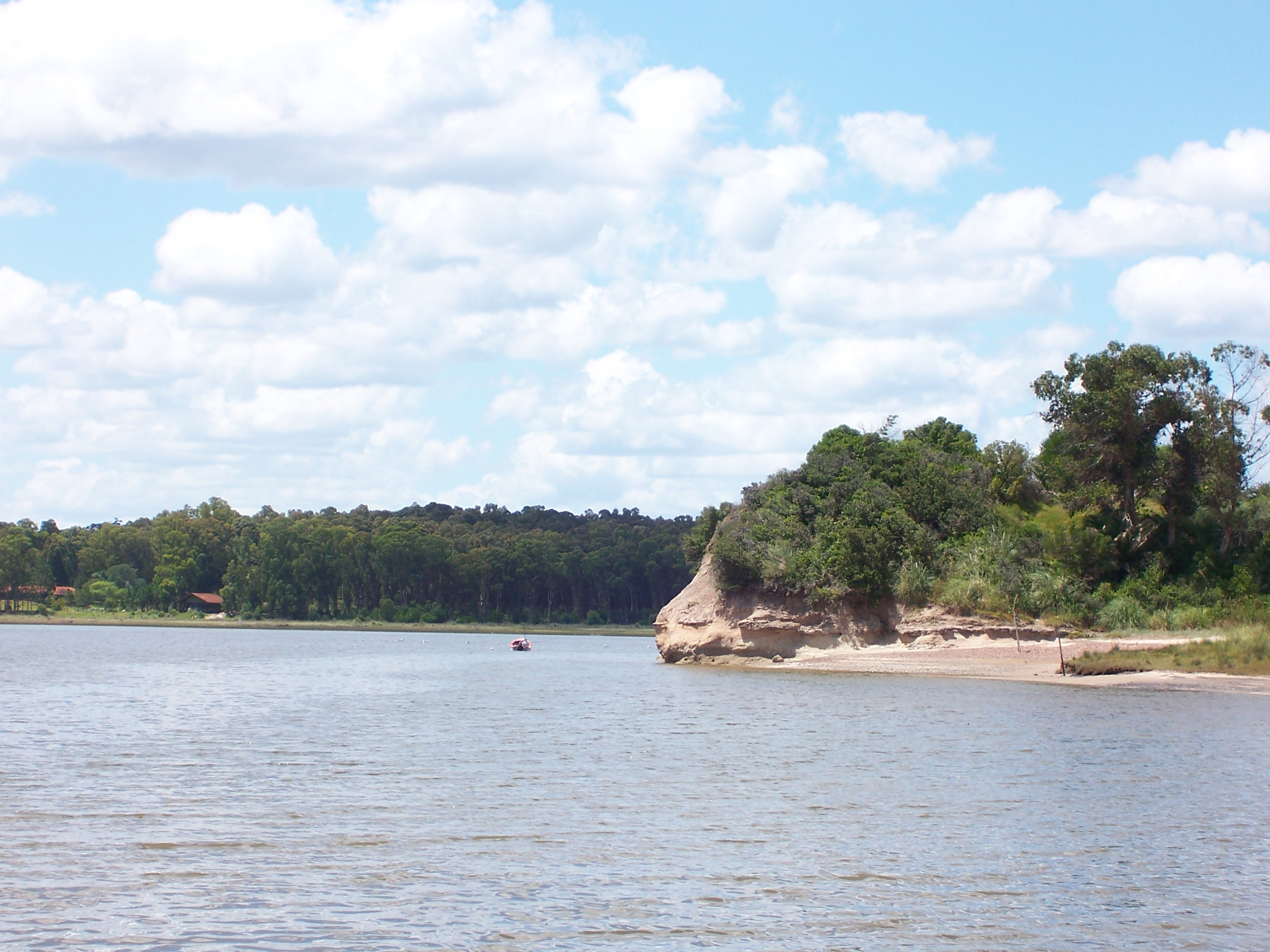

Location
- Country: Uruguay

Physical characteristics
- Length: 30 km (19 mi)
- Basin size: 1,409 km^{2} (544 sq mi)

Solís Grande Creek is a Uruguayan river, crossing Lavalleja, Canelones and Maldonado Departments. It flows into the Río de la Plata, between the seaside resorts of Jaureguiberry and Solís.

Contrary to what is popularly believed, it is not called Solís by the Spanish explorer Juan Díaz de Solís, but by a man named Solís whose lands were between two rivers, today known as Arroyo Solís Grande and Arroyo Solís Chico.

== See also ==
- List of rivers of Uruguay
