= Atlántida, Uruguay =

Atlántida
- City
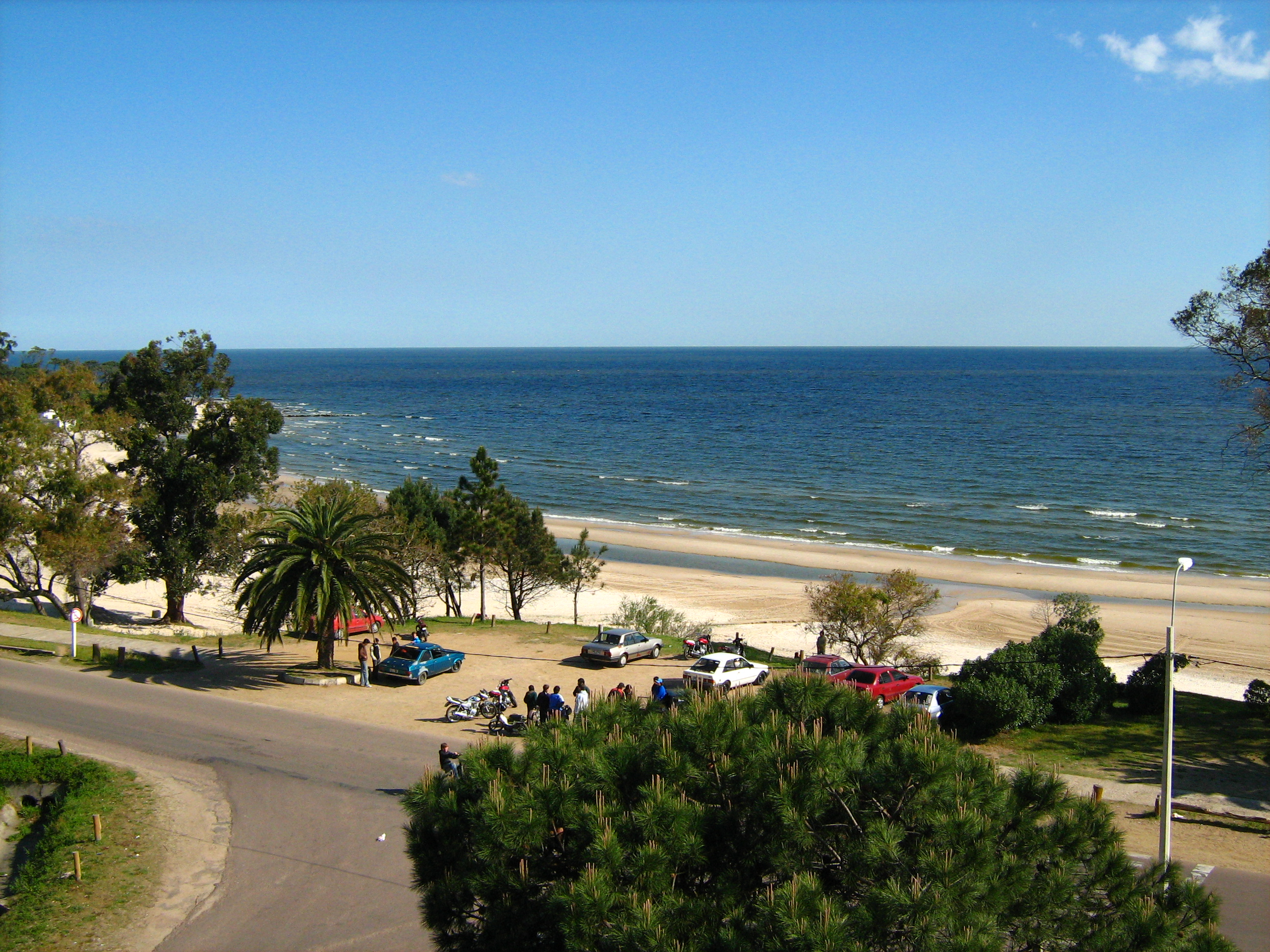

- Location within Uruguay
- Coordinates: 34°46′0″S 55°45′0″W
- Country: Uruguay
- Department: Canelones
- Founded: 1911

Population (2011 Census)
  - Total: 5,562
- Time zone: UTC -3
- Postal code: 16000
- Dial plan: +598 437 (+5 digits)

Atlántida is a resort town of the Costa de Oro in Canelones Department of Uruguay, 45 kilometres (28 mi) east of Montevideo. It is located on Ruta Interbalnearia, near the junction with Route 11.

Atlántida is also the name of the municipality to which the town belongs and which includes a few more resort towns to the north and to the west of the town, i.e. Estación Atlántida, City Golf, Villa Argentina, Fortín de Santa Rosa and rural areas to their north.

== History ==
Atlántida started in the beginning of the 20th century as a resort for the elite class of Montevideo and remained so until the mid-1950s. Today it is mainly a middle class resort with more than 10,000 permanent inhabitants.

The first plans of a resort in the area were drawn in 1911 and in the next year the parcelling and selling of plots began. In 1913 the Hotel Las Toscas was built near the beach, which in 1915 took on its current name, Atlántida. The development accelerated from 1939 onwards, when Natalio Michelizzi (a wealthy Italian businessman living in Buenos Aires) decided to buy all the land that had not been parcelled or developed, and invested in its development. On September 7, 1967, by the Act of Ley N° 13.609, it became classified as a city.

== Population ==
According to the 2011 census, Atlántida had a population of 5,562. In 2010, the Intendencia de Canelones had recorded a population of 10,393 for the municipality during the elections.

Location map of the Municipality of Atlántida

Year	Population
1963	1,559
1975	2,268
1985	2,764
1996	3,989
2004	4,580
2011	5,562

Source: Instituto Nacional de Estadística de Uruguay

== Beaches ==
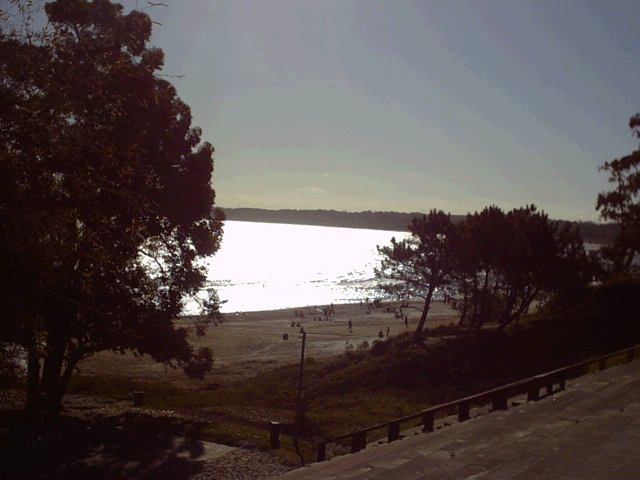
Playa La Mansa

The beaches of Atlántida are frequented mainly by middle-class Uruguayans. They are characterized by being bordered by pine trees. The main beaches are Playa La Brava and Playa La Mansa. La Mansa is ideal for families, since the water is very calm, whilst La Brava typically has rougher currents and is very popular with people who practice water sports. These beaches are completely deserted in the winter months.

== Landmarks ==
- Dieste's Church of Christ the Worker, built in 1958-60 by Eladio Dieste is located in the northern suburb of Estación Atlántida, north of the Ruta Interbalnearia. It is architecturally striking, described as "a simple rectangle, with side walls rising up in undulating curves to the maximum amplitude of their arcs".
- In the nearby resort Villa Argentina, "El Águila" is an enigmatic and attractive stone building that gave rise to several legends, from a smuggler's haven, a Nazi observatory and a "cosmic energy centre". It was built by Michellizzi, who originally called it "La Quimera". For a while, La Quimera was used by Michellizzi as meeting place with friends and to spend long hours of reading in solitude. After he died, the building and its gardens deteriorated. Michellizzi also founded one of the first hotels in the area, Hotel Planeta Palace, which still stands today.

== Places of worship ==
- Church of the Sacred Heart (Roman Catholic)

== Images ==
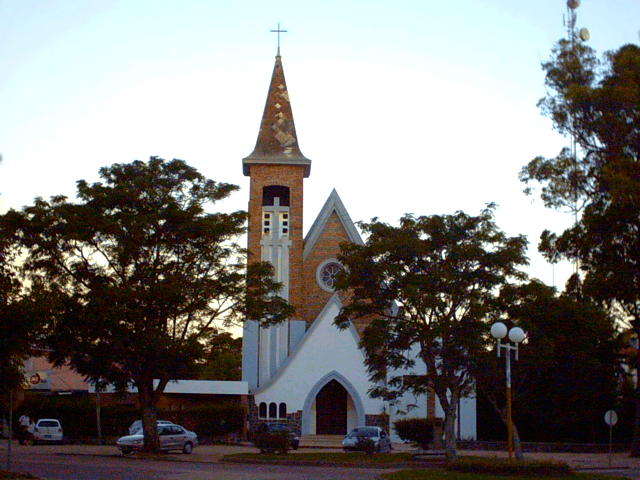
Iglesia Sagrado Corazón in Atlántida

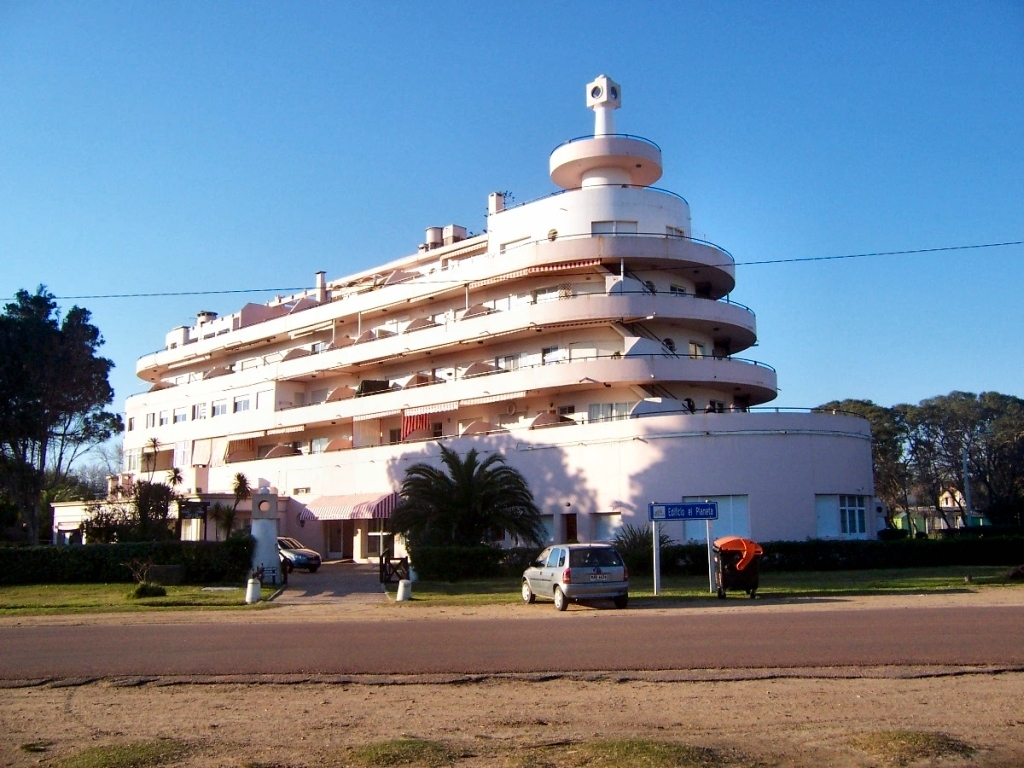
Edificio El Planeta in Atlántida

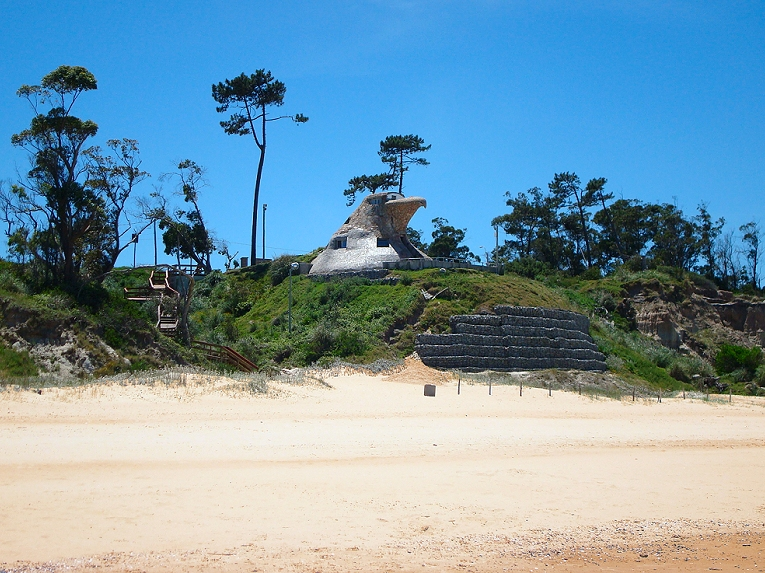
El Águila, Villa Argentina, near Atlántida
