= Araminda =

Seaside resort in Uruguay

Coordinates: 34.783°S 55.553°W

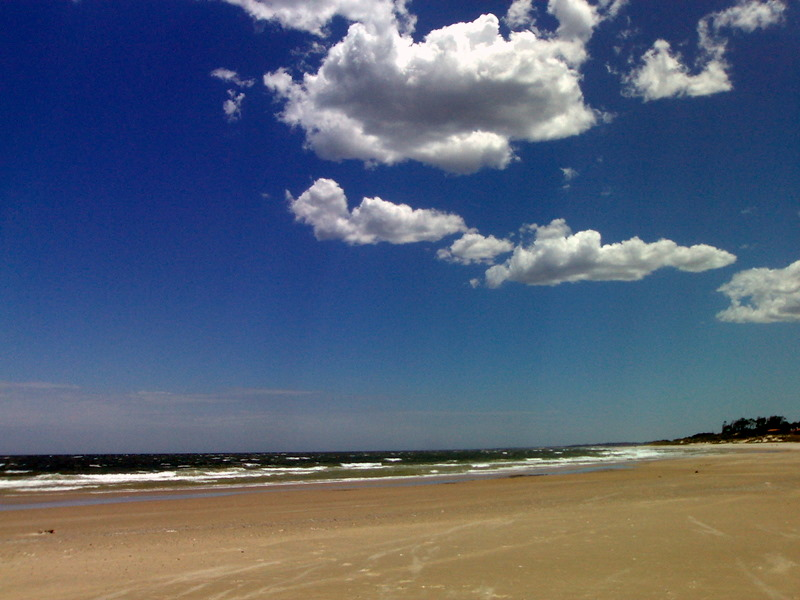
The beach of Araminda in December 2007

Araminda is a seaside resort in Canelones Department, Uruguay.
