= Las Vegas, Uruguay =

Las Vegas
- Resort
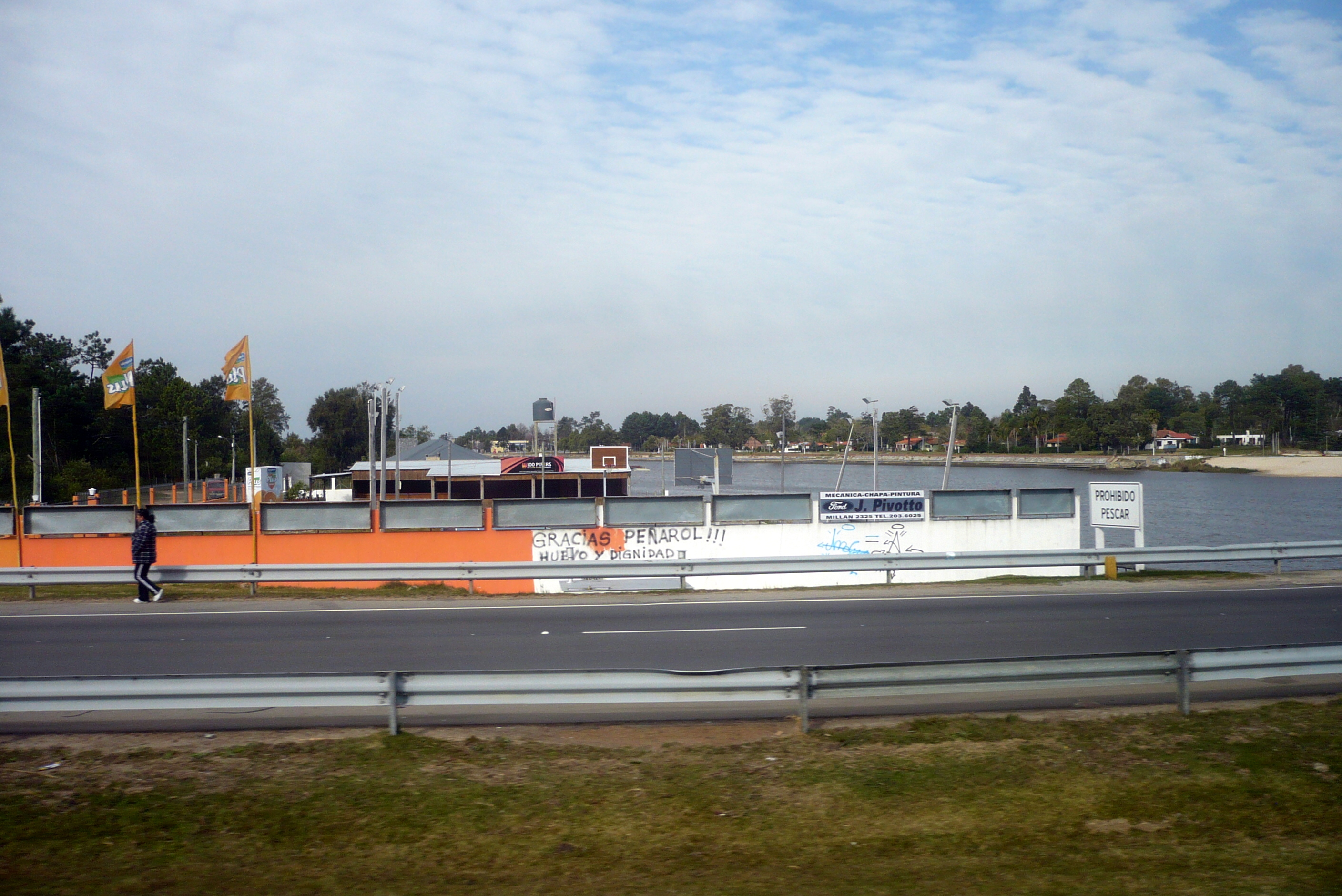

- Location in Uruguay
- Coordinates: 34°46′0″S 55°39′0″W
- Country: Uruguay
- Department: Canelones Department
- Time zone: UTC -3
- Dial plan: +598 437 (+5 digits)

Las Vegas is a tiny resort of the Costa de Oro in the Canelones Department of southern Uruguay.
