= Costa Azul =

- Village, resort
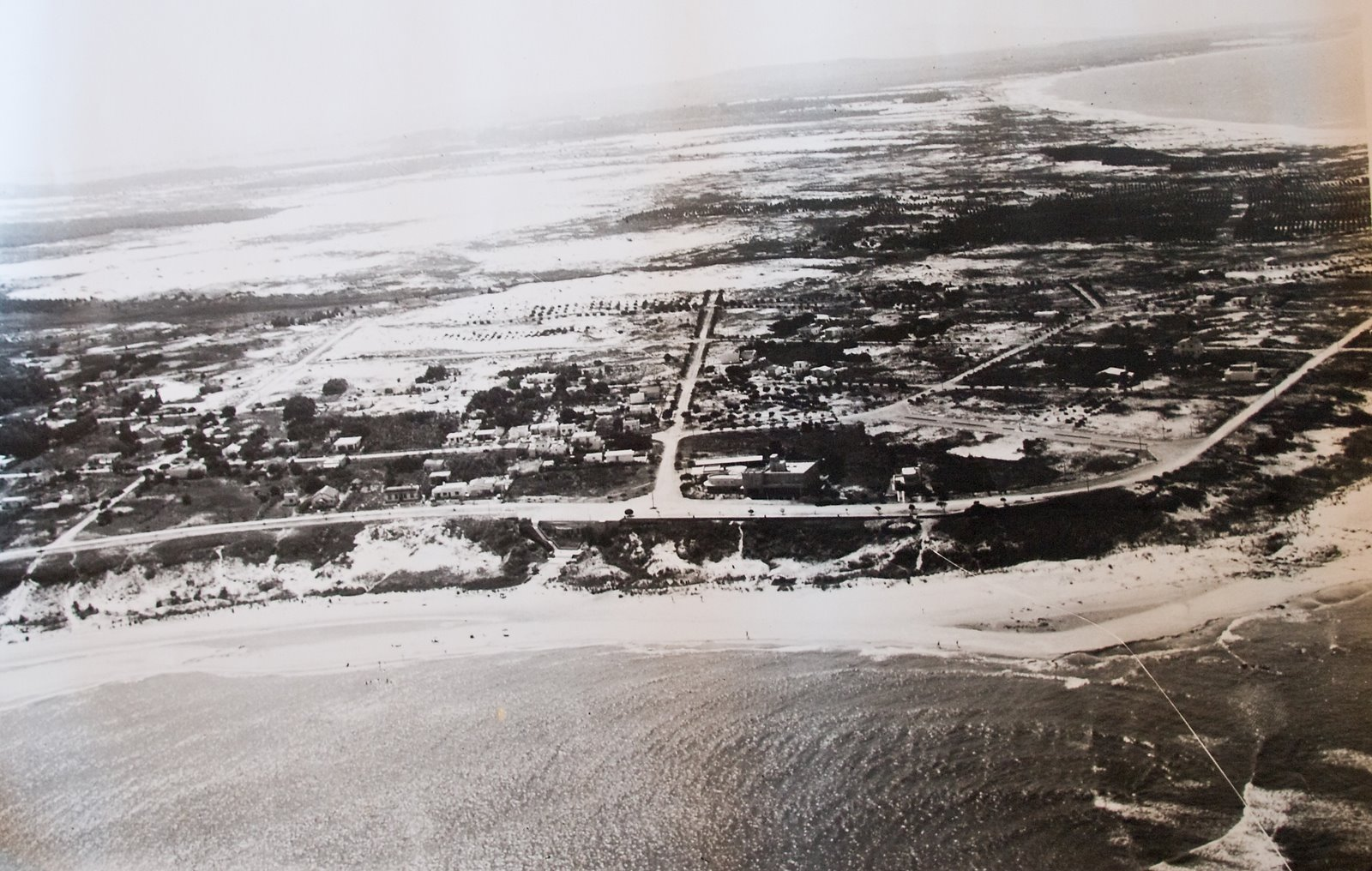

- Location in Uruguay
- Coordinates: 34°46′0″S 55°39′0″W
- Country: Uruguay
- Department: Canelones Department

Population (2011)
  - Total: 965
- Time zone: UTC -3
- Postal code: 16202
- Dial plan: +598 437 (+5 digits)

Costa Azul is a village and resort of the Costa de Oro in the Canelones Department of southern Uruguay.

== Population ==
In 2011 Costa Azul had a population of 965.

Year	Population
1963	271
1975	456
1985	554
1996	759
2004	826
2011	965

Source: Instituto Nacional de Estadística de Uruguay
