= Los Titanes, Canelones =

Resort in Uruguay

Coordinates: 34°47′S 55°35′W

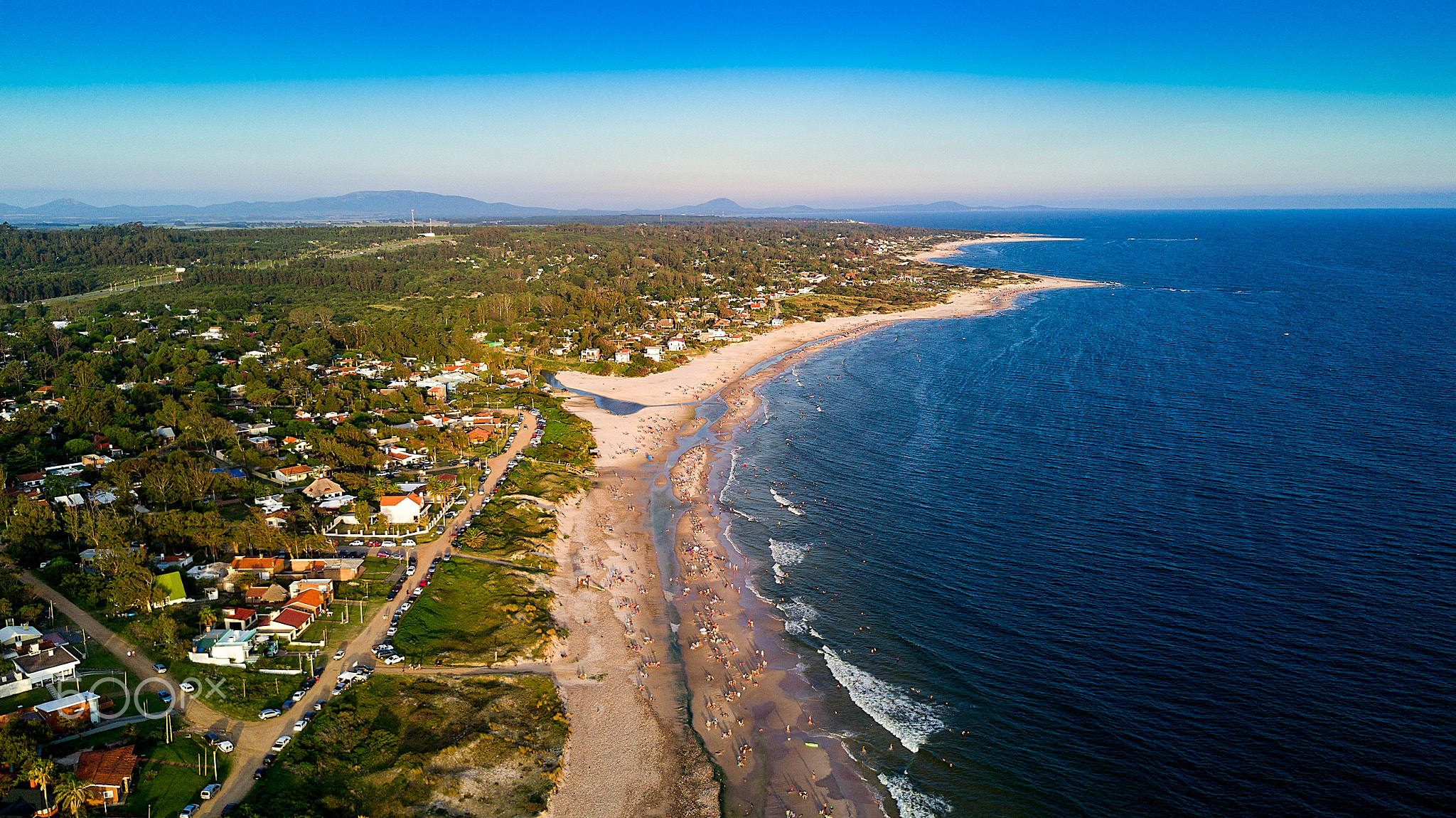
Los Titanes in summer 2017

Los Titanes is a seaside resort in Canelones Department, Uruguay.
