= Santa Ana, Canelones =

Seaside resort in Uruguay

Coordinates: 34.790°S 55.469°W

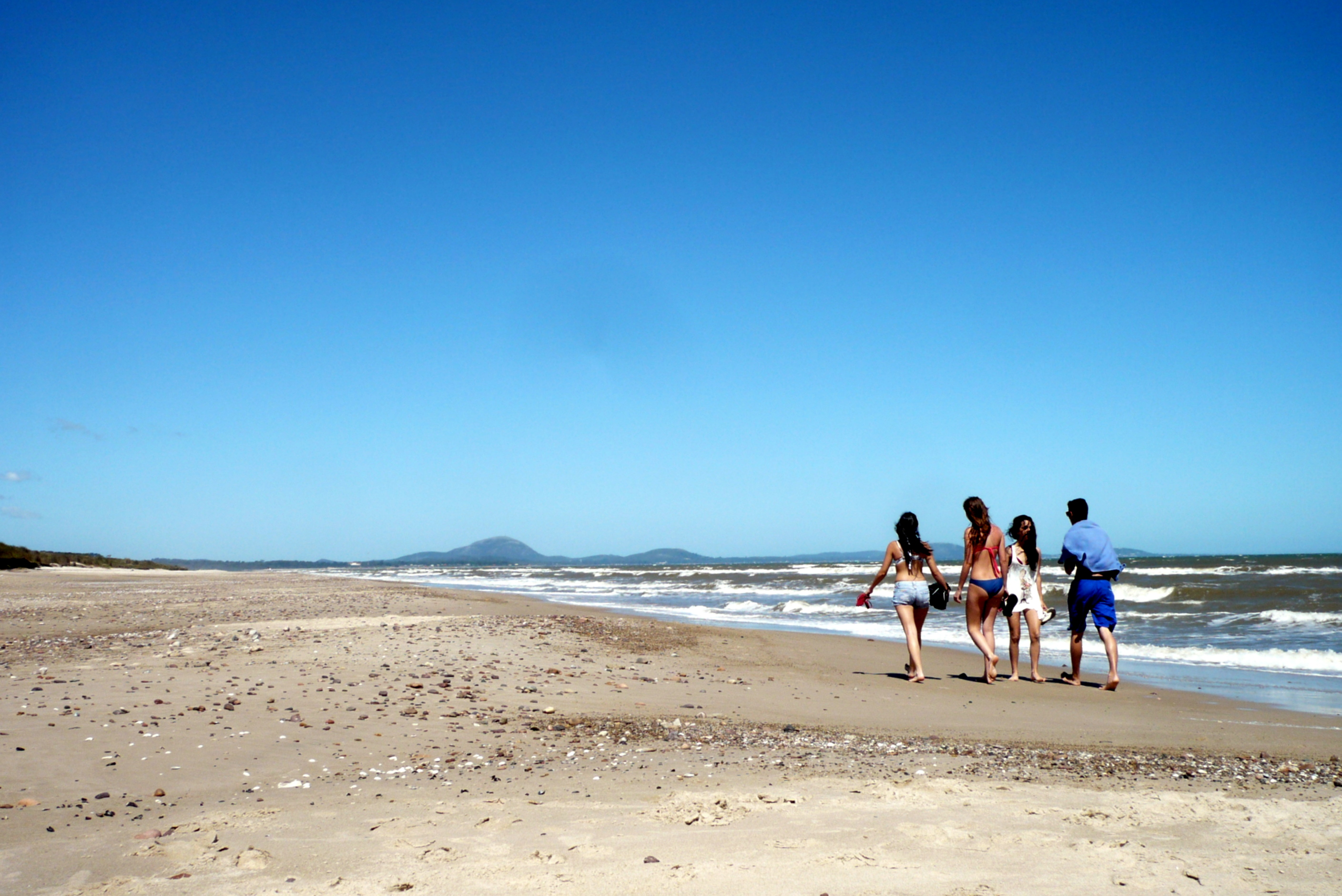
Beach of Santa Ana in December 2011

Santa Ana is a seaside resort in Canelones Department, Uruguay.
