= Cuchilla Alta =

- Village
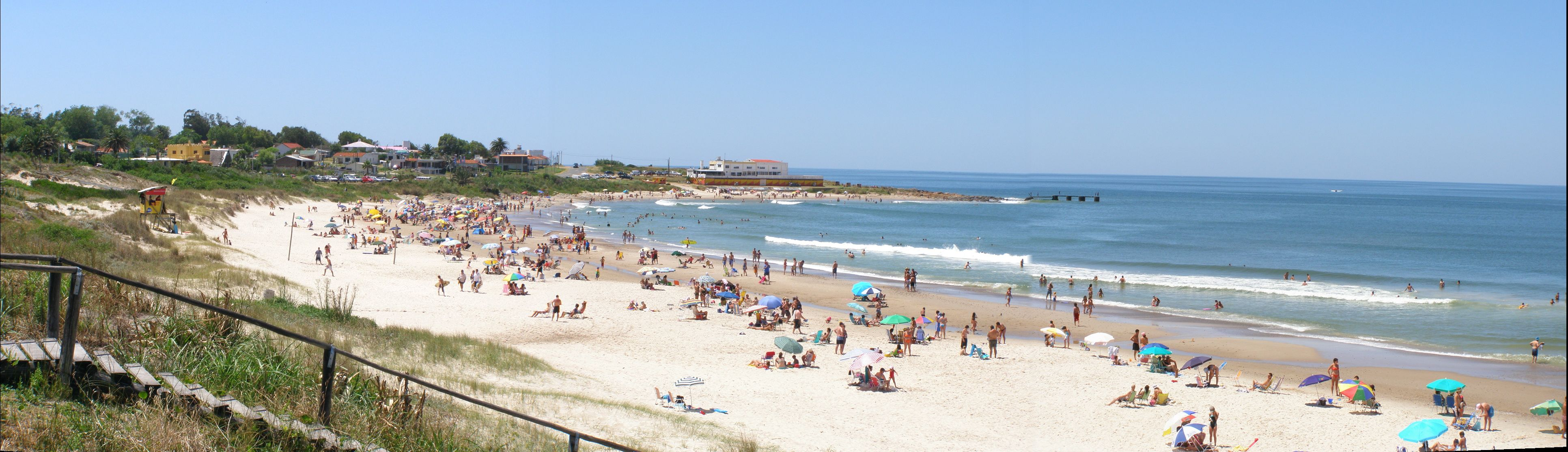

- Location in Uruguay
- Coordinates: 34°47′40″S 55°29′40″W
- Country: Uruguay
- Department: Canelones Department

Population (2011)
  - Total: 527
- Time zone: UTC -3
- Postal code: 16400
- Dial plan: +598 4378 (+4 digits)

Cuchilla Alta (the Spanish term for High Hill) is a seaside resort of the Costa de Oro, in Canelones Department of Uruguay, Montevideo.

== Geography ==
=== Location ===
It is located about 72 kilometres (45 mi) east of Montevideo between the resorts Santa Lucía del Este and El Galeon.

== Population ==
In 2011 Cuchilla Alta had a population of 527 inhabitants.

Year	Population
1963	148
1975	206
1985	297
1996	404
2004	435
2011	527

Source: Instituto Nacional de Estadística de Uruguay

== Tourism ==
This tourist complex is noted for its deep beaches. It offers regional tourists an ample range of services with its cabins, motels and commercial facilities.
