= Pando Creek =

Coordinates: 34°48′S 55°52′W

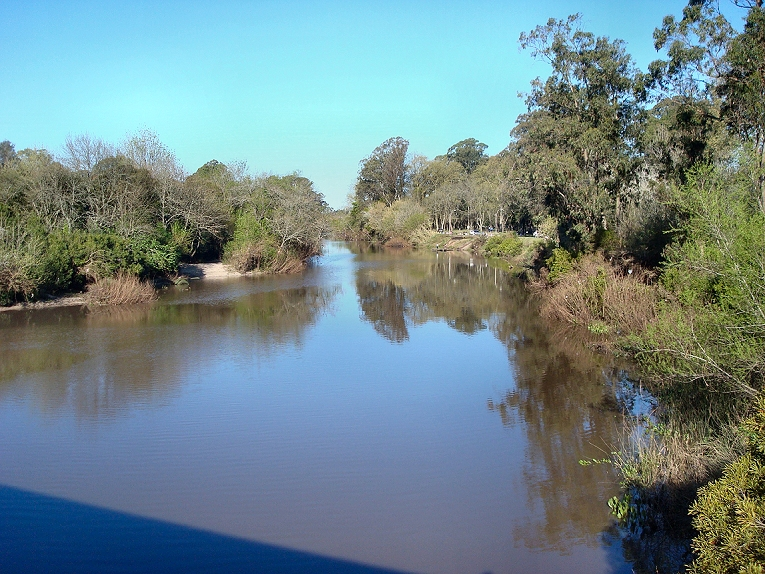

Location
- Country: Uruguay

Physical characteristics
- Length: 28 km (17 mi)

Pando Creek (Spanish: Arroyo Pando) is a Uruguayan water stream, crossing Canelones Department. It flows into the Río de la Plata. Its name derives from the nearby city of Pando.

== See also ==
- List of rivers of Uruguay
