= Santa Lucía del Este =

Resort in Uruguay

Coordinates: 34°47′S 55°32′W

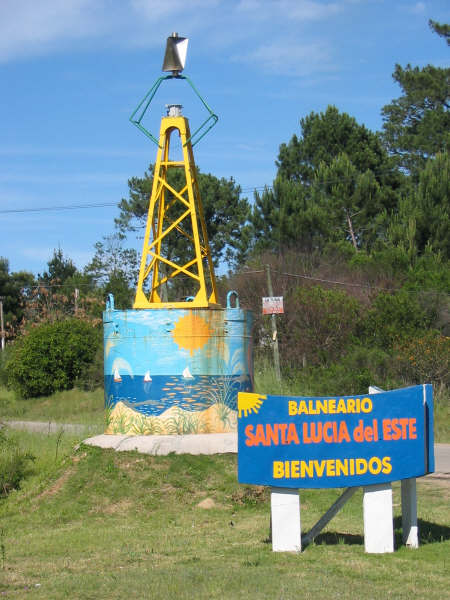
Welcome sign and buoy at the entrance to Santa Lucía del Este.

Santa Lucía del Este is a seaside resort in Canelones Department, Uruguay.
