= Guazú-Virá =

Resort in Uruguay

Coordinates: 34°46′S 55°37′W

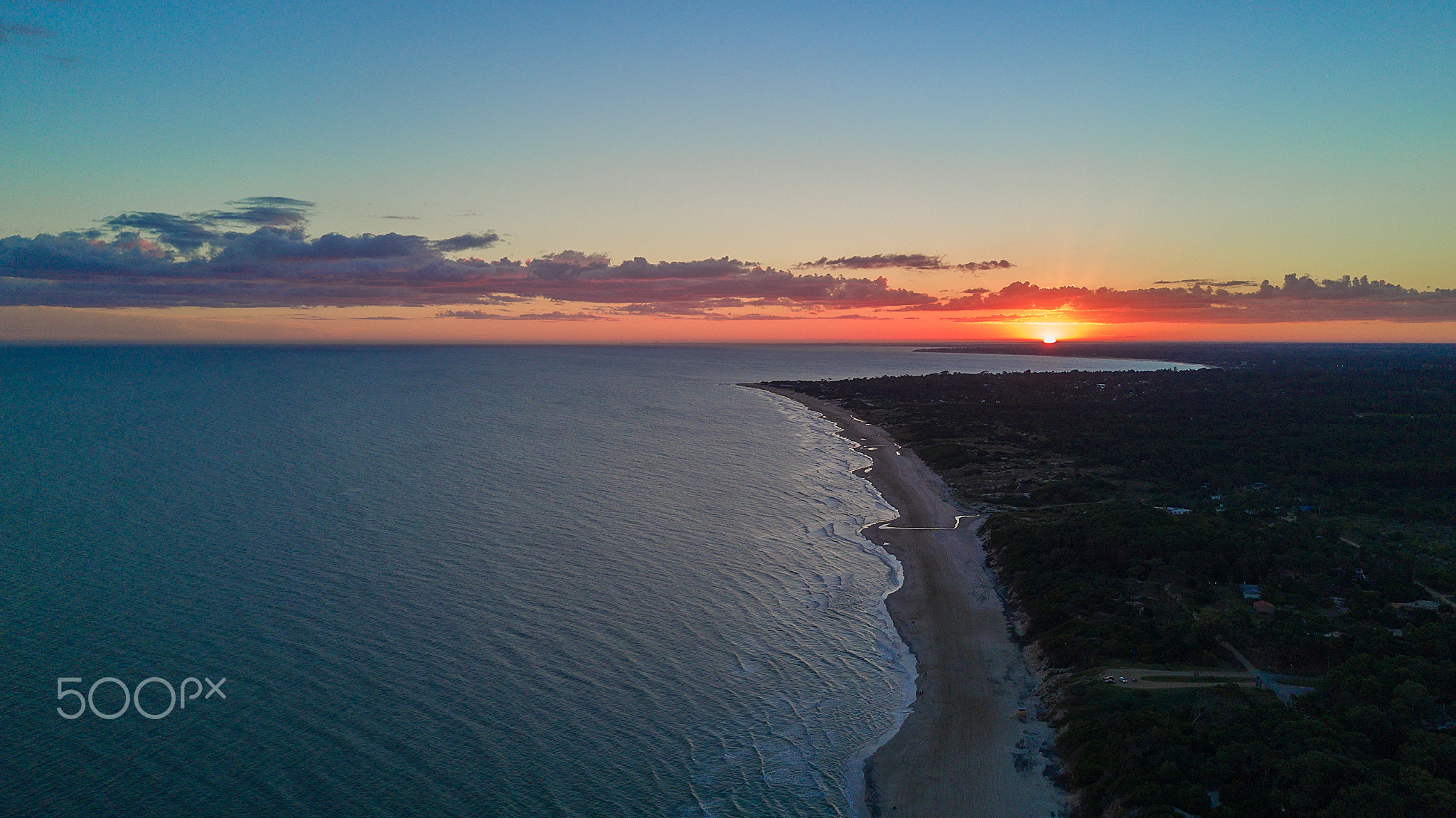
Guazú-Virá in summer 2017

Guazuvirá or Guazú-Virá is a seaside resort in Canelones Department, Uruguay. Its name is the Guarani word for "gray brocket" (Mazama gouazoubira).
