= Ruta Interbalnearia =

Road in Uruguay

Ruta Interbalnearia Ruta Líber Seregni

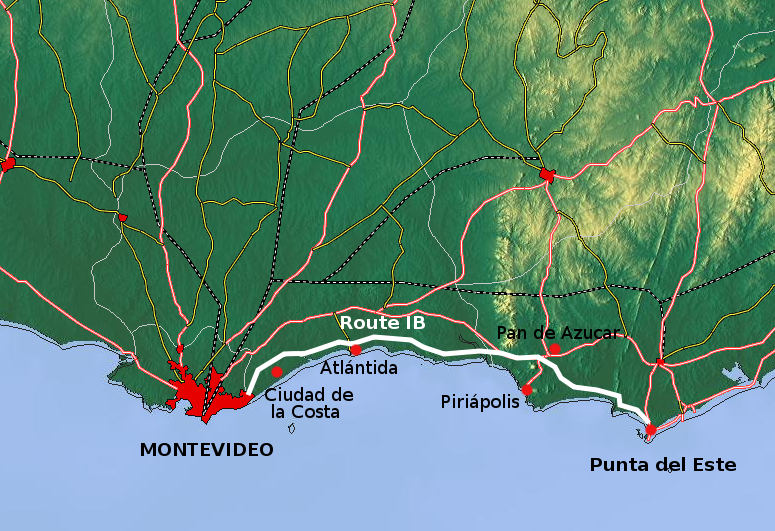

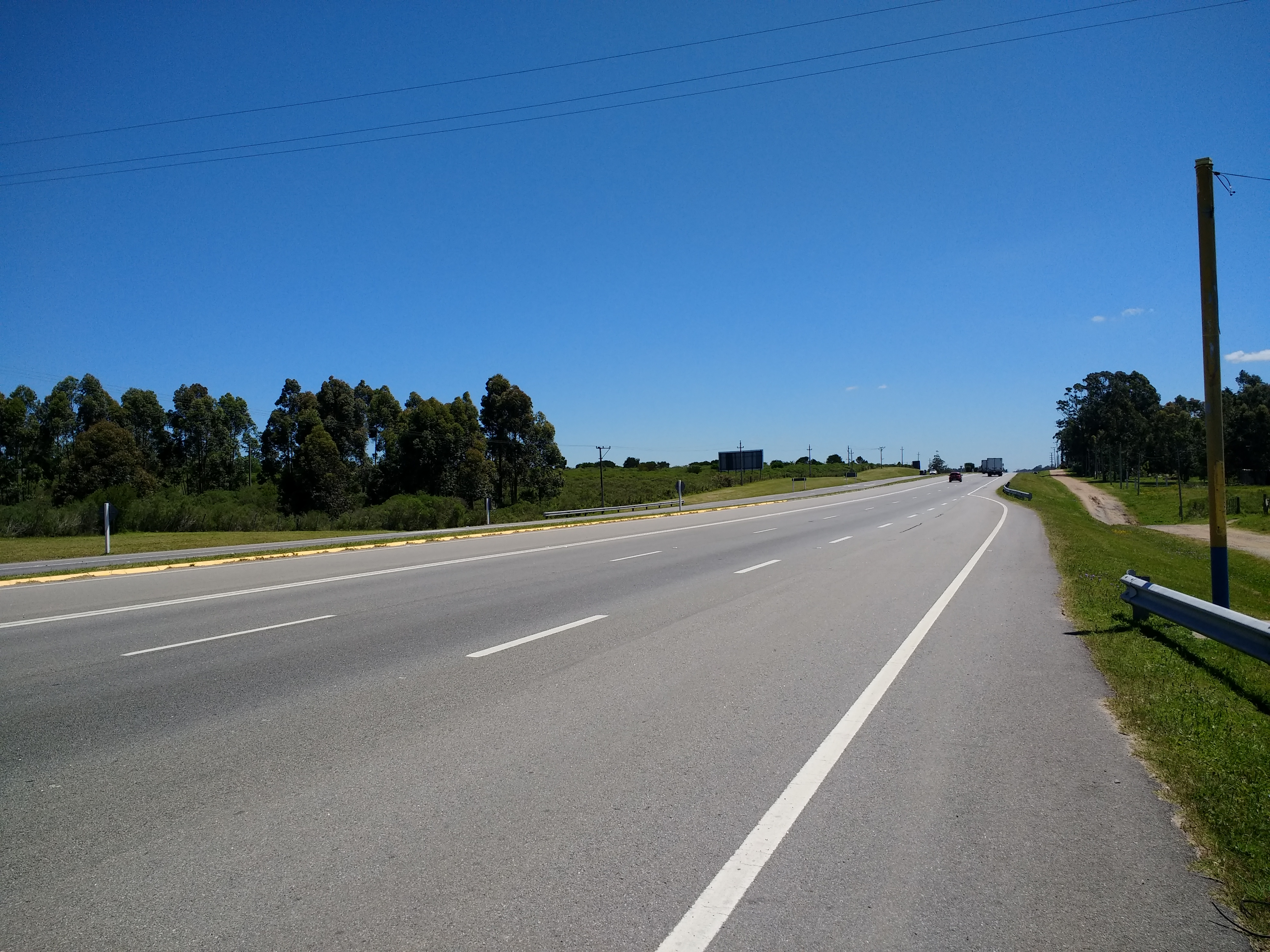

Route information
- Maintained by Ministry of Transport & Public Works
- Length: 106.9 km (66.4 mi)

Major junctions
- West end: Montevideo (Avenida Italia) >
- Canelones Department: (Avenida de las Américas) > • Ciudad de la Costa -: Route 101 N > Pando; • Salinas -: Routes 34, 87 N > Empalme Olmos; • Atlántida -: Route 11 N, W Canelones, San José; • La Floresta -: Route 35 N > Dr. Francisco Soca; • Cuchilla Alta -: Route 70 N > Route 9 Maldonado Department: • Solís -: Route 9 (merges from Pando); • Pan de Azúcar: Route 37 S > Piriápolis; Route 60 N > Minas; Route 9 (splits) E > Rocha, Chuí; • Punta Ballena -: Route 12 N > Minas; > (Rambla Claudio Williman)
- East end: Punta del Este

Location
- Country: Uruguay

Highway system
- National Routes of Uruguay
← Route 1	→ Route 10

Ruta Interbalnearia (which means Inter-resort Route) or Ruta Líber Seregni is a national route of Uruguay. It connects Montevideo with Punta del Este to the east along the coast. The road is approximately 90 kilometres (56 mi) in length. It is marked on maps and signs as IB.

The distance notation along Ruta Interbalnearia uses the same Kilometre Zero reference as Routes 1, 3, 5, 6, 7, 8, 9 and 10 which is the Pillar of Peace of Plaza de Cagancha in Central Montevideo.

== Destinations and junctions ==
These are the populated places Route 5 passes through, as well as its main junctions with other National Roads.

Montevideo Department

- From the city centre up to the border with Canelones Department, Avenida Italia is the main route for traffic to and from Ruta Interbalnearia.

Canelones Department

- Upon crossing the bridge over Arroyo Carrasco and entering Ciudad de la Costa, Avenida Italia turns into Avenida de las Americas, which after 3.6 kilometres (2.2 mi) ends at the old entrance of Carrasco International Airport. There, Route 101 (the extension of Camino Carrasco which goes to Pando) carries the traffic for another 2 kilometres (1.2 mi) until its junction with Ruta Interbalnearia.
- For the next 12.5 kilometres (7.8 mi), Route IB crosses the resorts of Ciudad de la Costa until the bridge over Arroyo Pando.
- Salinas, Routes 34, 87 North to Empalme Olmos.
- Atlántida, Route 11 North and then West to Canelones and San José.
- La Floresta, Route 35 North to Dr. Francisco Soca. (This junction is a bowtie variant of a dumbbell interchange.)
- Cuchilla Alta, Route 70 North to Route 9.

Maldonado Department

- Solís, Route 9 merges from Pando.
- Pan de Azúcar, Route 37 South to Piriápolis, Route 60 North to Minas and Route 9 splits East to Rocha and Chuy.
- Punta Ballena, Route 12 North to Minas. Note: The part from Pan de Azúcar until the Arroyo del Portero (before Pinares - Las Delicias) is marked in some maps and other sources as Route 93.
- Upon reaching Pinares – Las Delicias it turns into Rambla Claudio Williman all the way to Punta del Este.
