= Nuestra Señora del Carmen, Salto =

Roman Catholic parish church in Salto, Uruguay

Parroquia Nuestra Señora del Carmen
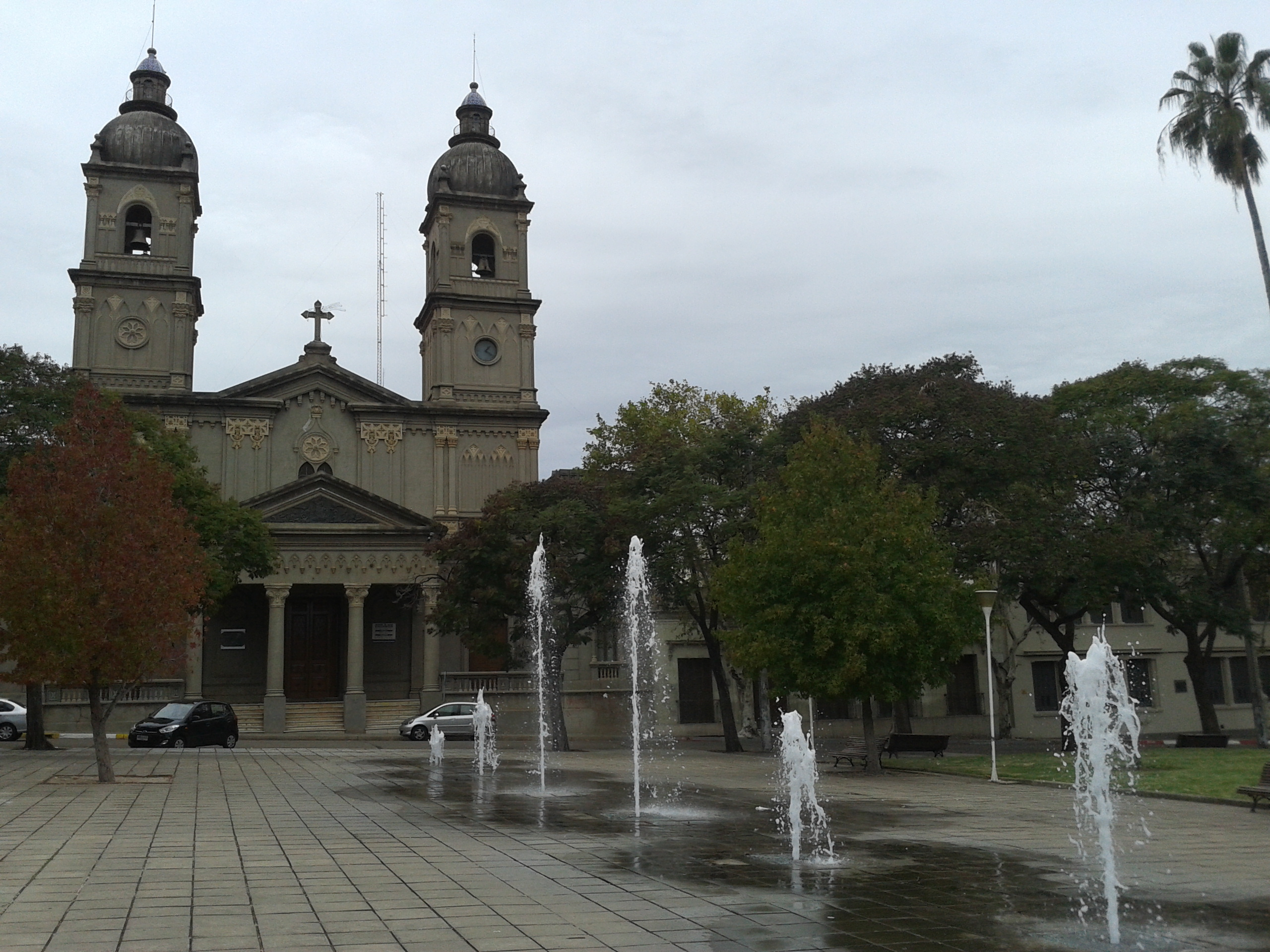
- Church of Our Lady of Mount Carmel, seen from the Square of the Thirty-Three Orientals.

Religion
- Affiliation: Roman Catholic
- Diocese: Diocese of Salto
- Year consecrated: 1855

Location
- Location: Florencio Sánchez entre Uruguay y Artigas; Salto, Uruguay
- Interactive map of Parroquia Nuestra Señora del Carmen

The Parish Church of Our Lady of Mount Carmel (Spanish: Parroquia Nuestra Señora del Carmen) is a Roman Catholic parish church in Salto.

== History ==
The Church of Mount Carmel is famous as the oldest Christian temple in Salto; in 1818 was built the first small chapel dedicated to Our Lady of Mount Carmel. The present temple was built around 1855 and expanded afterwards; it has a big patrimonial value. Its bells date back from 1686 and came from the Jesuitic Missions.

== Same devotion ==
There are other churches in Uruguay dedicated to Our Lady of the Mount Carmel:

- Church of Our Lady of Mt. Carmel
- Church of Our Lady of Mt. Carmel (Aguada)
- Church of Our Lady of Mt. Carmel (Cordón)
- Church of Our Lady of Mt. Carmel and St. Saint Thérèse of Lisieux (Prado)
- Church of Our Lady of Mt. Carmel and St. Cajetan
- Church of Our Lady of Mt. Carmel in Migues
- Church of Our Lady of Mt. Carmel in Toledo
- Church of Our Lady of Mt. Carmel in Capilla del Sauce
- Church of Our Lady of Mt. Carmel in Durazno
- Church of Our Lady of Mt. Carmel in Villa del Carmen
- Church of Our Lady of Mt. Carmel in Melo
- Church of Our Lady of Mt. Carmel in San Gregorio de Polanco
- Church of Our Lady of Mt. Carmel in Solís de Mataojo
- Church of Our Lady of Mt. Carmel in Carmelo

== See also ==
- Roman Catholic Diocese of Salto
