= Nuestra Señora del Carmen, Aguada, Montevideo =

Coordinates: 34°53′37.3″S 56°11′17.3″W

Our Lady of Mount Carmel
- Basilica of Our Lady of Mount Carmel
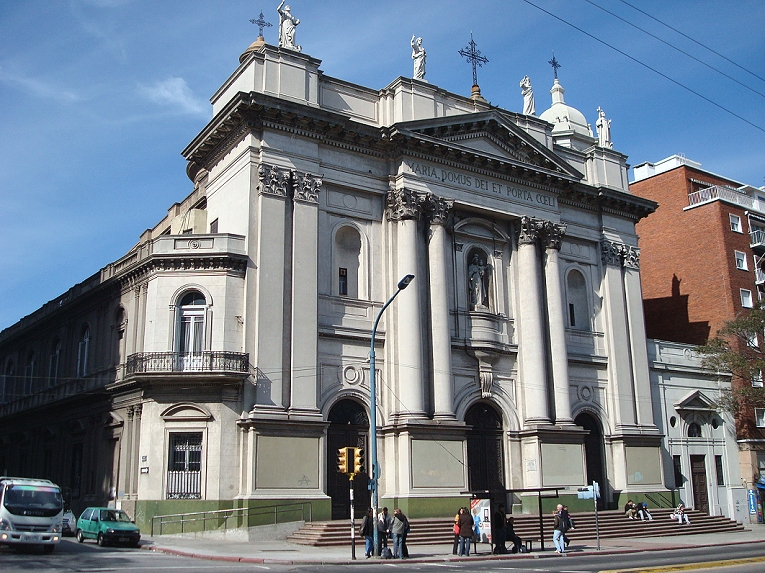
- Our Lady of Mount Carmel
- Location: Aguada, Montevideo
- Address: Libertador Avenue
- Country: Uruguay
- Denomination: Roman Catholic

History
- Founded: 1861
- Dedication: Our Lady of Mount Carmel
- Consecrated: 1866

Architecture
- Functional status: Parish
- Architectural type: Neoclassical architecture
- Years built: 1890

The Church of Our Lady of the Mount Carmel (Spanish: Iglesia de Nuestra Señora del Carmen), popularly known as Iglesia de la Aguada, is a Roman Catholic parish church in Montevideo, Uruguay.

== History ==

The basilica occupies the same ground where smaller churches once stood. The first chapel to Our Lady of Mount Carmel was erected in 1793. However, it was damaged in the English invasion of 1807 and demolished in the fights for independence. By 1827, another chapel had been erected, which served as the location where, in 1829, the First Constituent Assembly was summoned to draft the 1830 Constitution of Uruguay.

The current building was created in 1866 and was declared a basilica on June 8th, 1899, by Pope Leo XIII. An updated facade was constructed in 1980 in a neoclassical style with two bell towers. In the 1930s, as a result of the construction of the Diagonal Agraciada, its neoclassical facade had to be demolished and rebuilt in 1935 by the architects Elzeario Boix y Horacio Terra.

== Same devotion ==
The church is dedicated to Our Lady of Mount Carmel, a very popular devotion of the Virgin Mary.

There are other churches in Uruguay that are also dedicated to Our Lady of the Mount Carmel:

- Church of Our Lady of Mt. Carmel (Manga)
- Church of Our Lady of Mt. Carmel (Cordón)
- Church of Our Lady of Mt. Carmel and St. Saint Thérèse of Lisieux (Prado)
- Church of Our Lady of Mt. Carmel and St. Cajetan (Unión)
- Church of Our Lady of Mt. Carmel in Migues
- Church of Our Lady of Mt. Carmel in Toledo
- Church of Our Lady of Mt. Carmel in Capilla del Sauce
- Church of Our Lady of Mt. Carmel in Durazno
- Church of Our Lady of Mt. Carmel in Villa del Carmen
- Church of Our Lady of Mt. Carmel in Melo
- Church of Our Lady of Mt. Carmel in San Gregorio de Polanco
- Church of Our Lady of Mt. Carmel in Solís de Mataojo
- Church of Our Lady of Mt. Carmel in Carmelo
- Church of Our Lady of Mt. Carmel in Salto

== In fiction ==
- Part of the young adult novel Amigos orientales by Fabio Descalzi is set in this church.
