= Nuestra Señora del Carmen, Cordón, Montevideo =

Roman Catholic parish church in Montevideo, Uruguay

Coordinates: 34°54′15″S 56°10′59″W

Iglesia de Nuestra Señora del Carmen (Cordón)
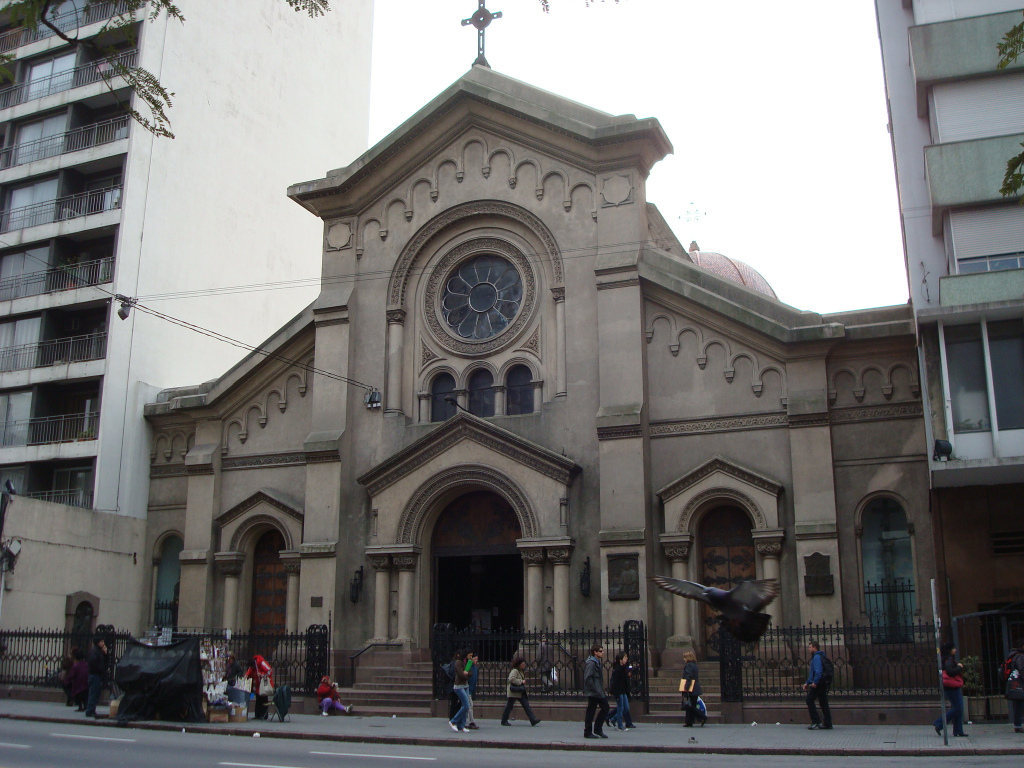

Religion
- Affiliation: Roman Catholic
- Ecclesiastical or organizational status: Parish church

Location
- Location: Av. 18 de Julio 1531; Montevideo, Uruguay
- Interactive map of Iglesia de Nuestra Señora del Carmen (Cordón)

Architecture
- Architect: Elzeario Boix
- Style: Neo-Romanesque
- Direction of façade: South

The Church of Our Lady of the Mount Carmel (Spanish: Iglesia de Nuestra Señora del Carmen), popularly known as Iglesia del Cordón, is a Roman Catholic parish church in Montevideo, Uruguay.

== Overview ==
The original church was established 1 October 1835. In 1874-1890 its parish priest was Mariano Soler, who later became the first Archbishop of Montevideo.

The present church was built in 1924 by architect Elzeario Boix in Neo-Romanesque style and is dedicated to Our Lady of Mount Carmel, a very popular devotion of the Virgin Mary. Inside can be also found an altar dedicated to St. Joseph of Cupertino, patron of poor students, and another to the Virgin of the Thirty-Three, patron of Uruguay.

Outside is placed a Galician cruceiro from 1800, the oldest in Uruguay.

== Same devotion ==
There are other churches in Uruguay dedicated to Our Lady of the Mount Carmel:

- Church of Our Lady of Mt. Carmel
- Church of Our Lady of Mt. Carmel (Aguada)
- Church of Our Lady of Mt. Carmel and St. Saint Thérèse of Lisieux (Prado)
- Church of Our Lady of Mt. Carmel and St. Cajetan
- Church of Our Lady of Mt. Carmel in Migues
- Church of Our Lady of Mt. Carmel in Toledo
- Church of Our Lady of Mt. Carmel in Capilla del Sauce
- Church of Our Lady of Mt. Carmel in Durazno
- Church of Our Lady of Mt. Carmel in Villa del Carmen
- Church of Our Lady of Mt. Carmel in Melo
- Church of Our Lady of Mt. Carmel in San Gregorio de Polanco
- Church of Our Lady of Mt. Carmel in Solís de Mataojo
- Church of Our Lady of Mt. Carmel in Carmelo
- Church of Our Lady of Mt. Carmel in Salto
