= María Eugenia Etcheverry =

Uruguayan fighter pilot (born 1976)

- Born: August 23, 1976 (age 50); Montevideo, Uruguay
- Military career
- Allegiance: Uruguay
- Branch: Uruguayan Air Force
- Service years: 2001 - present
- Rank: Lieutenant Colonel
- Commands: Liaison Squadron; Advanced Flight Squadron

María Eugenia Etcheverry is a Uruguayan Air Force pioneer and fighter pilot, who currently holds the rank of lieutenant colonel and serves since 2020 as the first aide-de-camp woman to the President of Uruguay. In 2002, Etcheverry and Carolina Arévalo became the first two female fighter pilots of South America, flying Cessna A-37B Dragonfly and FMA IA-58A Pucará respectively. She was also the first female Major and the first female Squadron Commander of the Uruguayan Air Force.

== Career ==
María Eugenia Etcheverry's father was a military pilot, but she wanted to pursue a military career on her own. In 1997, after the Uruguayan Air Force allowed women to join for the first time, María Eugenia Etcheverry was one of the first women to enroll at the Military School of Aeronautics alongside Carolina Arévalo. At the time, she was required to adhere to rules designed for men, such as short haircuts. After graduating in 2001, and after having flown SF-260EU, she was assigned to the Tte. 2° Mario W. Parallada Air Base in Santa Bernardina, Durazno, where she trained in aerobatics and advanced tactical flight, flying Pilatus PC-7U Turbo Trainer.

Both Etcheverry and Arévalo both began their active military service in 2001, becoming the first female combat pilots in Latin America. Etcheverry was the first to fly, taking off from the Tte. 2° Mario W. Parallada Air Force Base in a Cessna A-37 Dragonfly, followed by Arévalo, flying a FMA IA-58A Pucará.

Etcheverry continued to set new firsts for the Uruguayan Air Force, becoming the first woman to lead an air force squadron of sixteen pilots, and the first to become a Major. Both Etcheverry and Arévalo were named Women of the Year by Zonta Punta del Este - Maldonado, for their pioneering work as pilots in the military. When Etcheverry became pregnant, she did not fly for nine months, instead she worked in maintenance tasks of Cessna U-206H Stationair and Beechcraft UB-58 Baron aircraft. As a result of her rise in rank, she has since stopped flying combat missions altogether.

In 2020, Etcheverry became the first woman to serve as aide-de-camp to the President of the Republic, while holding the rank of Lieutenant Colonel of the Uruguayan Air Force.

== Flight Information ==
Rating: Command Pilot

Aircraft flown: SF-260EU, PC-7U, A-37B, U-206H, UB-58
