= San Jorge, Uruguay =

San Jorge
- Village
- Location in Uruguay
- Coordinates: 32°50′35″S 55°53′45″W
- Country: Uruguay
- Department: Durazno Department
- Elevation: 111 m (365 ft)

Population (2011)
  - Total: 502
- Time zone: UTC-03:00 (UYT)
- Dial plan: +598 436 (+5 digits)

San Jorge is a village or populated centre in the Durazno Department of central Uruguay.

== Geography ==
The village is located on Route 100, about 76 kilometres (47 mi) northeast of its junction with Route 14 and 76 kilometres (47 mi) northeast of the department capital city of Durazno.

The artificial lake Lago Rincón del Bonete is 13 kilometres (8.1 mi) north of the village and the stream Arroyo Chileno 13 kilometres (8.1 mi) to the east. This stream flows in a wide vale that floods when the lake has high waters. Because of this, the circumventing road connecting the village with its nearby town of Blanquillo is about 56 kilometres (35 mi) long. The nearest populated place to San Jorge is the village Aguas Buenas, 7 kilometres (4.3 mi) to the southeast.

== History ==
San Jorge was established as a British enclave in the 19th century. The estancia San Jorge was a centre of industrial and agricultural modernization: land was fenced off to secure private property, afforestation took place, there were advances in cattle breeding techniques, and a flour mill was constructed. In 1897, residents of San Jorge were the first British riders to play polo on Uruguayan soil.

Since 2004, the village has held the Encuentro Británico-Oriental, an annual festival featuring a parade, horseback riding contests, music, stands selling handcrafted goods, as well as a tour to historical points of interest.

== Population ==
In 2011 San Jorge had a population of 502.

Year	Population
1963	182
1975	173
1985	230
1996	376
2004	545
2011	502

Source: Instituto Nacional de Estadística de Uruguay
