= Centenario, Uruguay =

Centenario
- Town
- Location in Uruguay
- Coordinates: 32°49′48″S 56°29′56″W
- Country: Uruguay
- Department: Durazno Department

Population (2011)
  - Total: 1,136
- Time zone: UTC -3
- Postal code: 97007
- Dial plan: +598 4664 (+4 digits)

Centenario is a small town in the north of Durazno Department of central Uruguay.

== Geography ==
The town is located on Route 5, just across Río Negro from Paso de los Toros of Tacuarembó Department. It is about 66 kilometres (41 mi) north of the city of Durazno.

== Population ==
In 2011 it had a population of 1,136.

Year	Population
1963	826
1975	940
1985	880
1996	913
2004	1,038
2011	1,136

Source: Instituto Nacional de Estadística de Uruguay
