= Avenida del Libertador =

Avenida del Libertador may refer to:

- Avenida del Libertador (Buenos Aires), a road in Buenos Aires, Argentina.
- Avenida del Libertador (Montevideo), a road in Montevideo, the capital city of Uruguay.
