= Libertador Avenue =

Street in Montevideo, Uruguay

Coordinates: 34.9031°S 56.1931°W

Avenida del Libertador
- Avenida del Libertador Brigadier General Juan Antonio Lavalleja
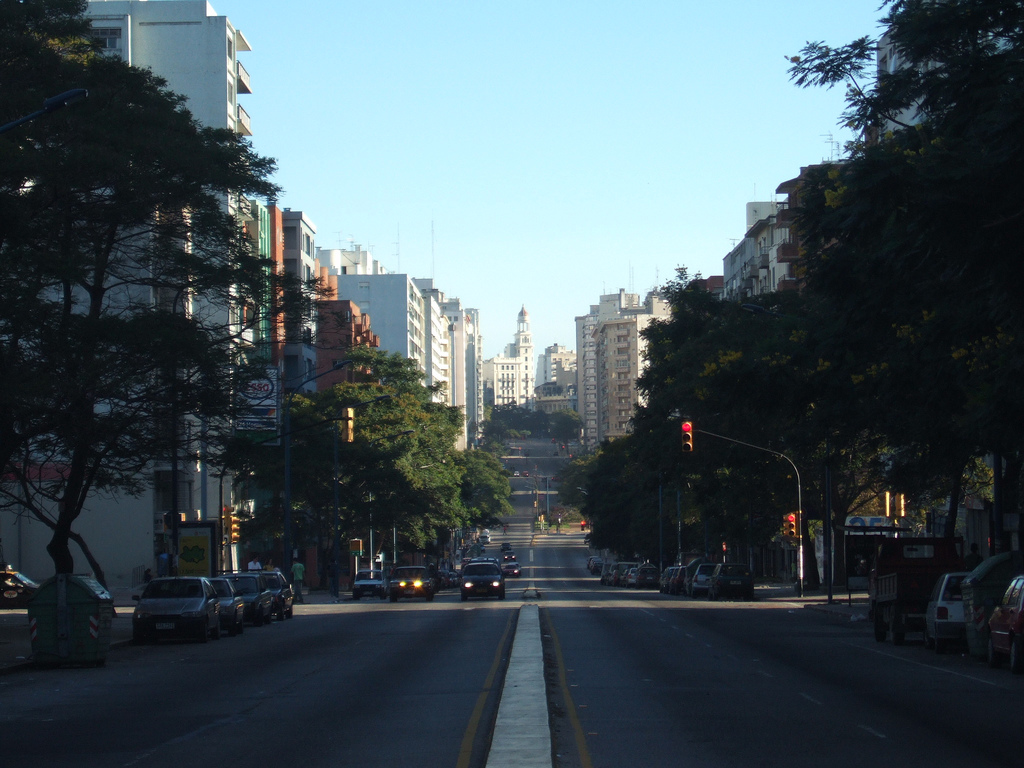
- Interactive map of Avenida del Libertador
- Length: 1.5 km (0.93 mi)
- Location: Montevideo, Uruguay
- South end: Plaza Fabini
- North end: Legislative Palace

Libertador Avenue is a major avenue in Montevideo, Uruguay. It stretches north from the Legislative Palace in Aguada to Plaza Fabini in Centro, and is named after Juan Antonio Lavalleja, revolutionary figure and politician, who led the group of the Thirty-Three Orientals in the insurrection for the independence of Oriental Province.

== History and description ==
In its beginnings it was called Agraciada Avenue, but in the 1920s the Agraciada Diagonal project was carried out, which consisted of widening the road, which required the demolition of buildings such as the original façade of the Church of Our Lady of the Mount Carmel. The new diagonal joined the Legislative Palace, which was inaugurated in 1925, with the central business district. In the 1940s, buildings such as the headquarters of the State Insurance Bank and the National Administration of Fuels, Alcohol and Portland (ANCAP) were erected.

Despite being 1.5 kilometres (0.93 mi) long, it carries a large amount of traffic, as it serves as an entrance to the barrio Centro and Ciudad Vieja from the north of the city. Libertador Avenue crosses Isabella I of Castile Square, located one block from the General Artigas railway station, and is where the President and Vice President parade to Plaza Independencia after taking the oath at the General Assembly in each inauguration.

== Gallery ==
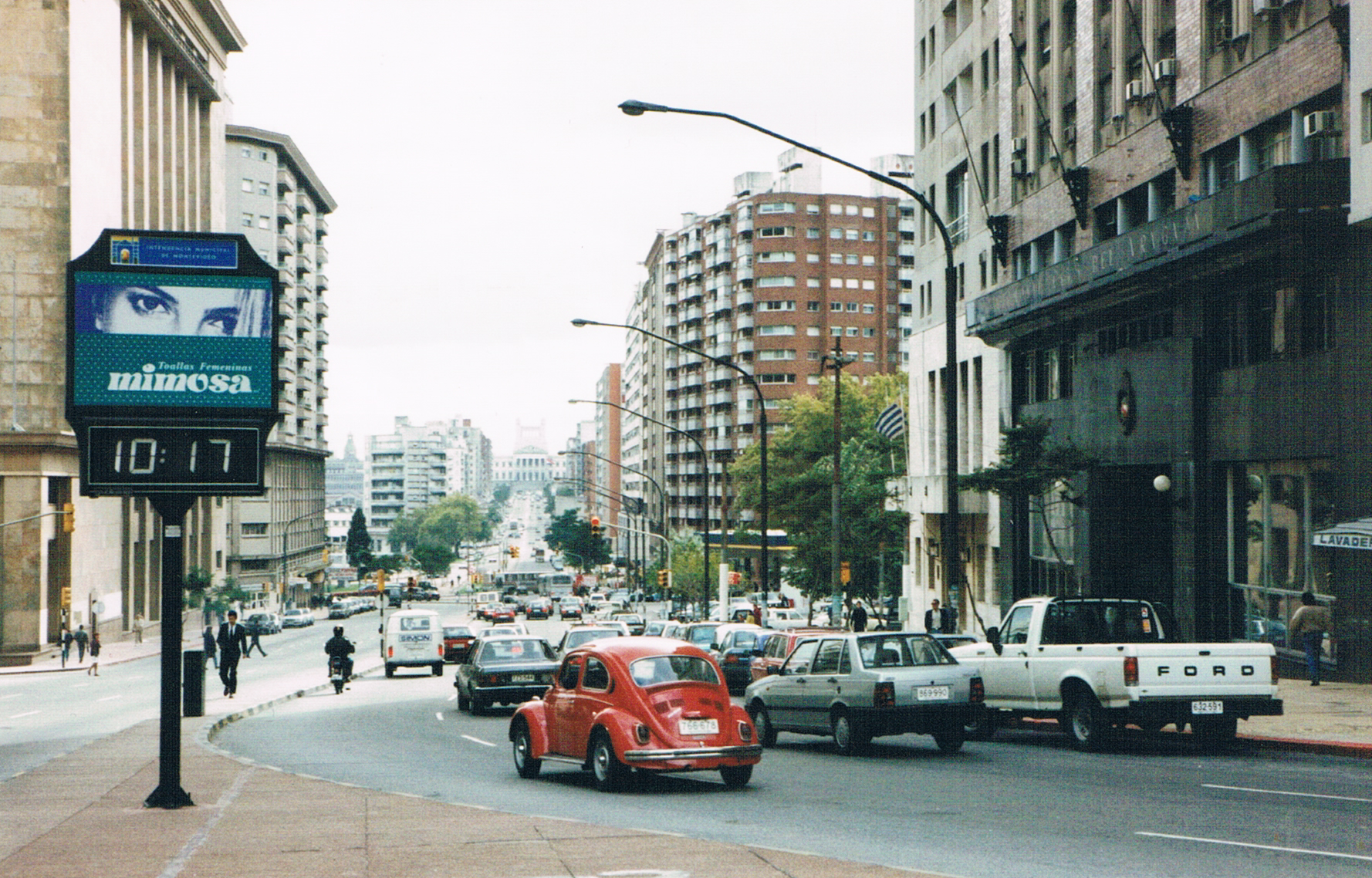
View to the north side

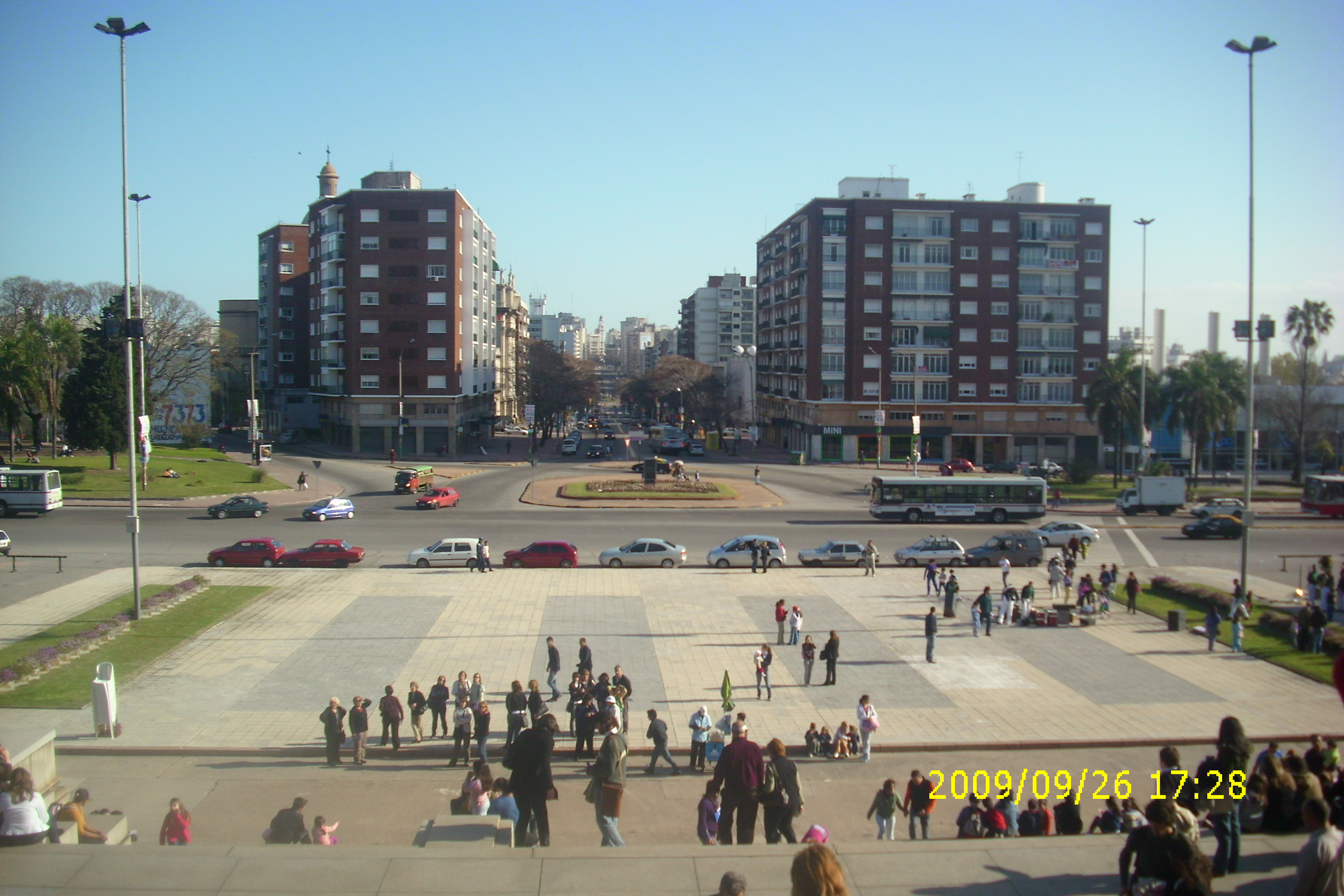
View from the steps of the Legislative Palace

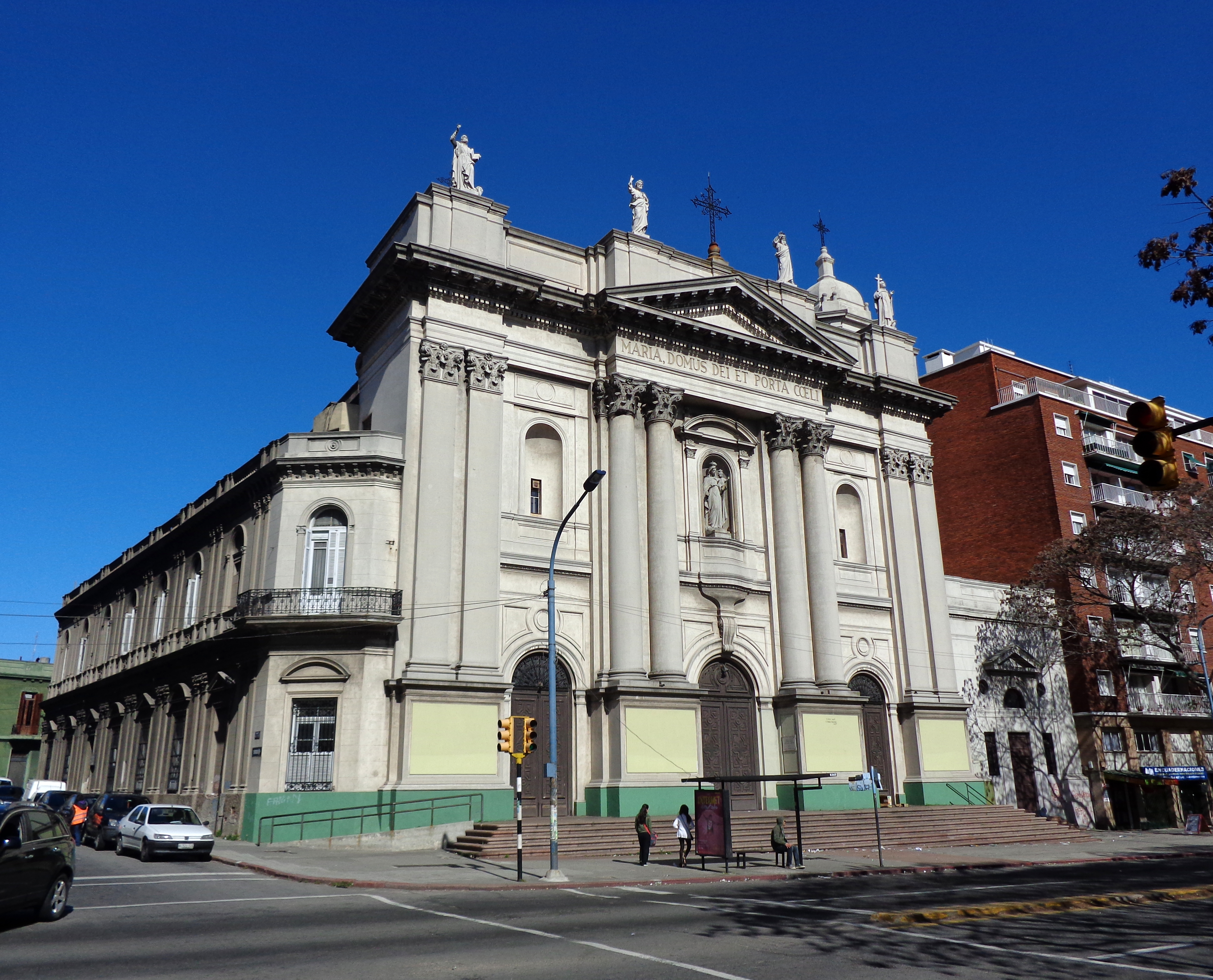
Church of our Lady of the Mount Carmel

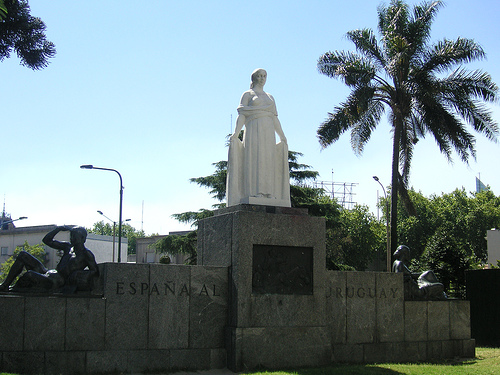
Monument in honor of Spain in Isabella I of Castile Square

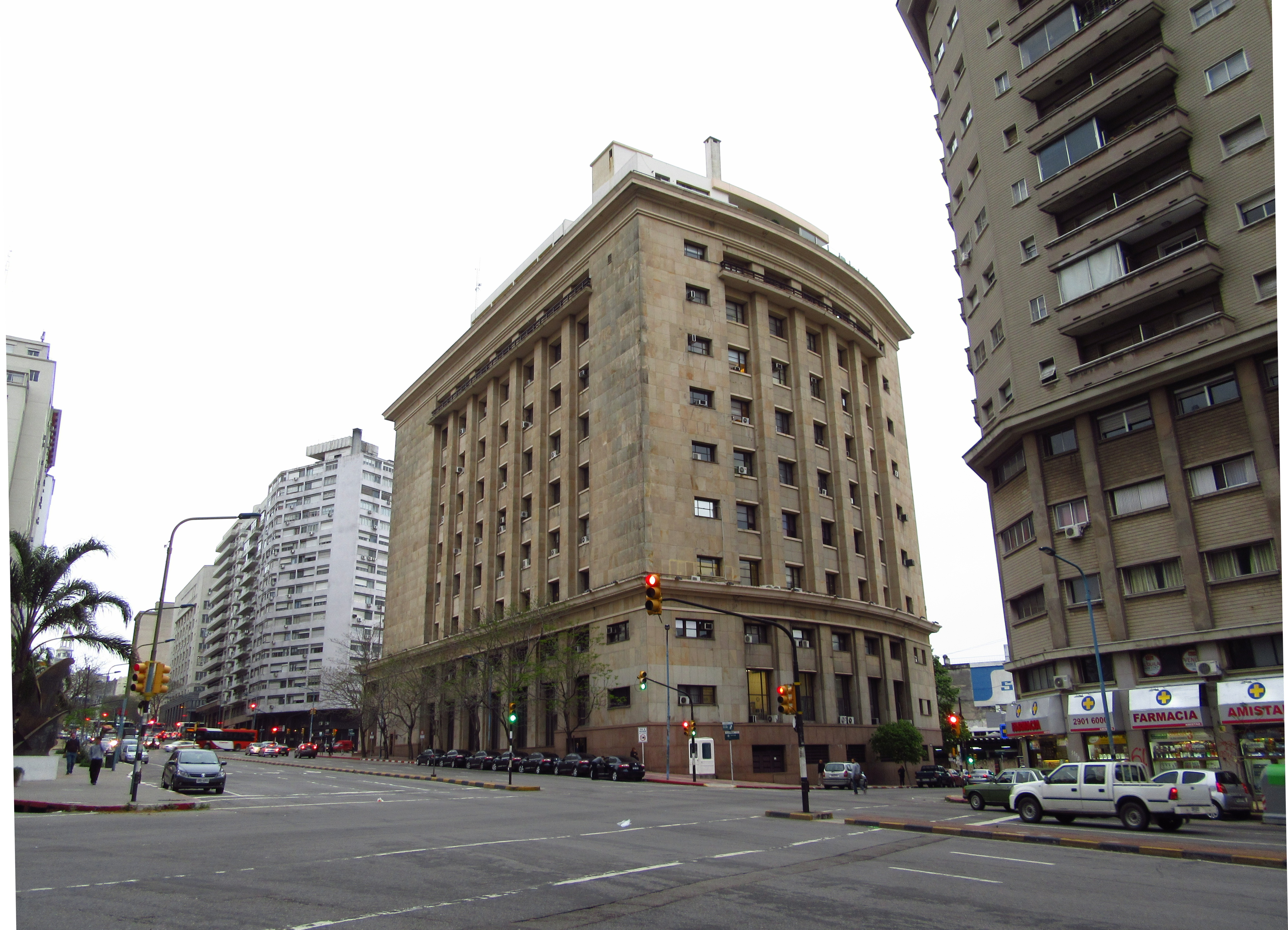
National Administration of Fuels, Alcohol and Portland headquarters
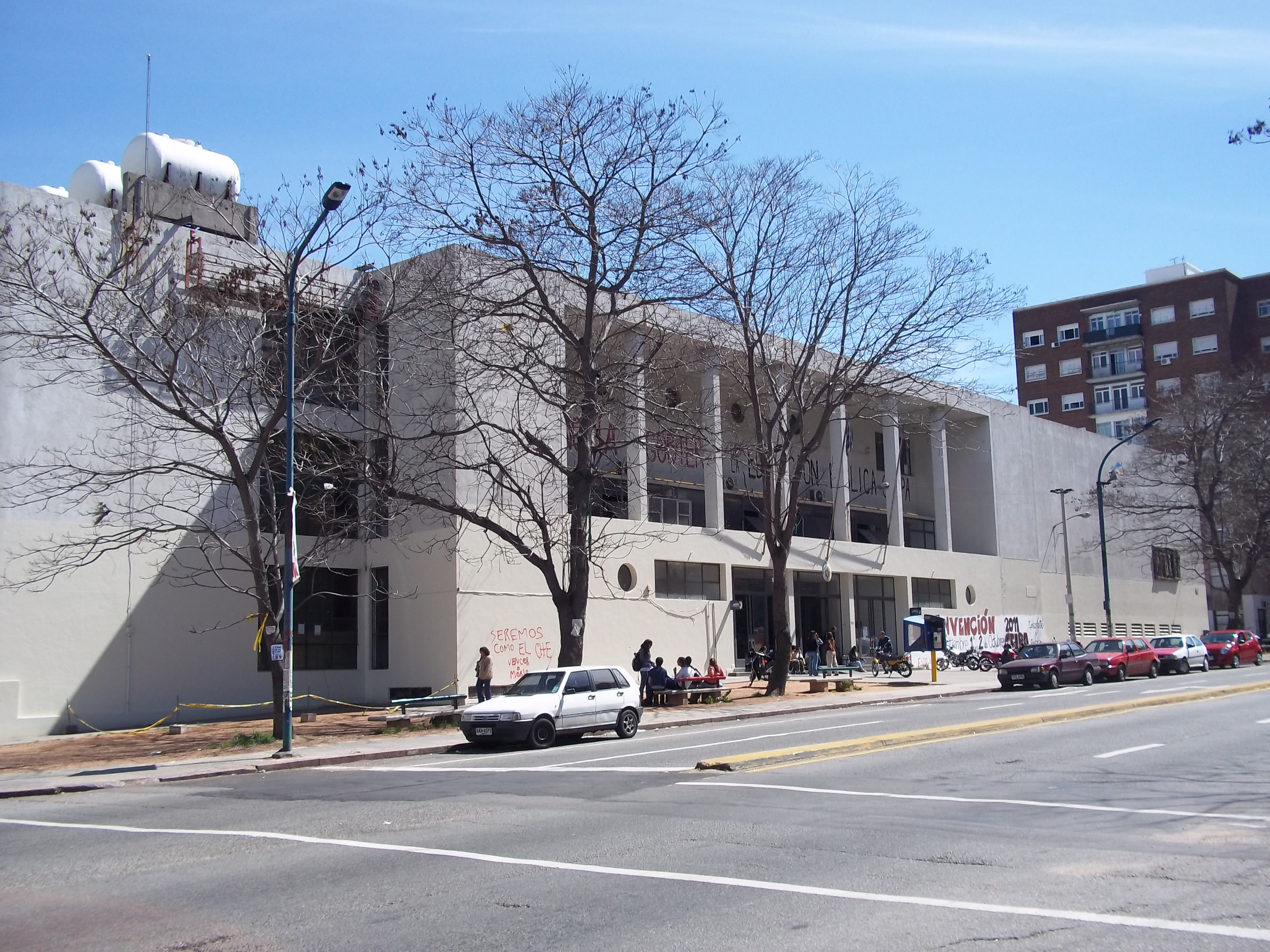
Artigas Teachers Institute

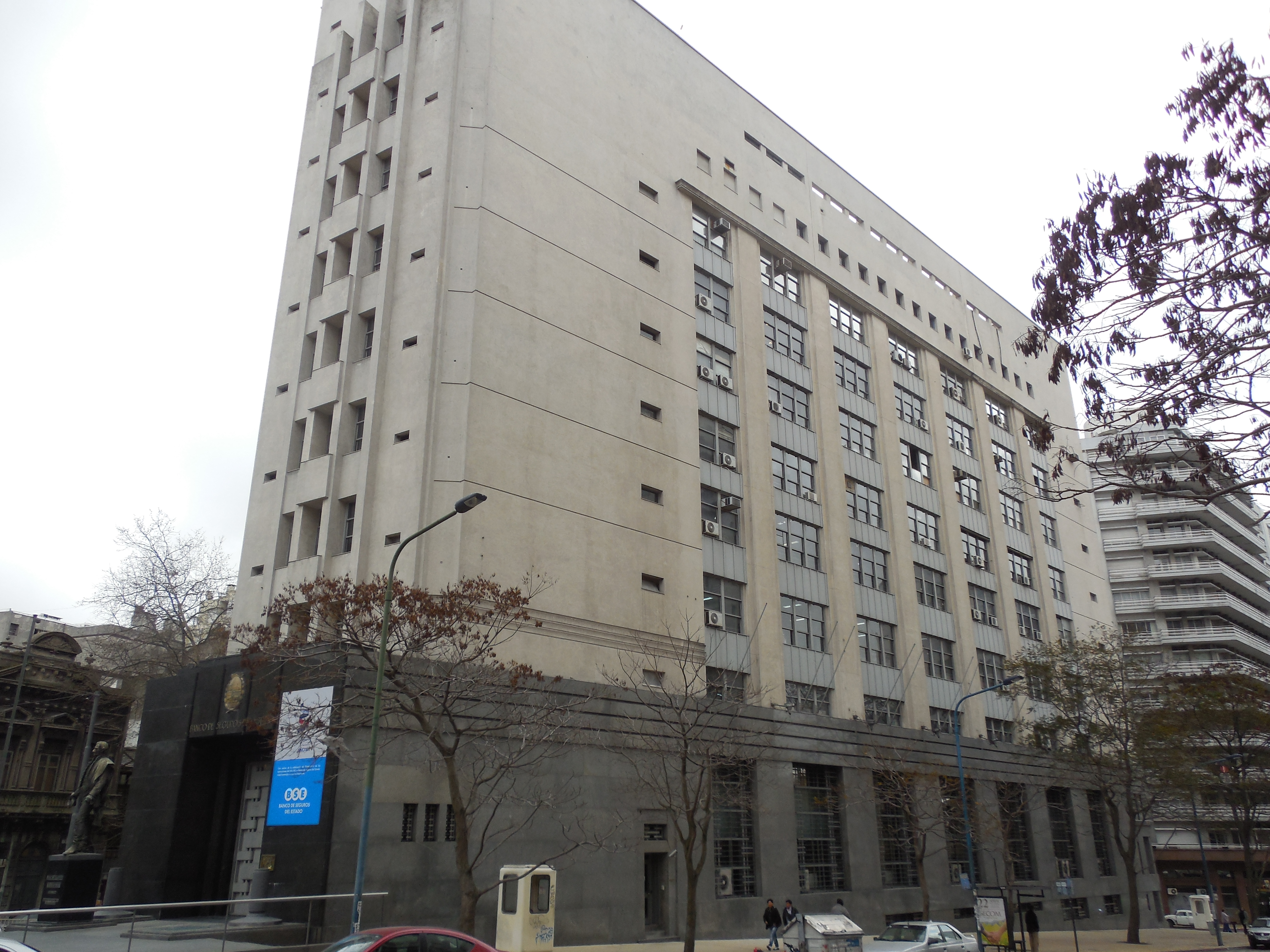
State Insurance Bank headquarters

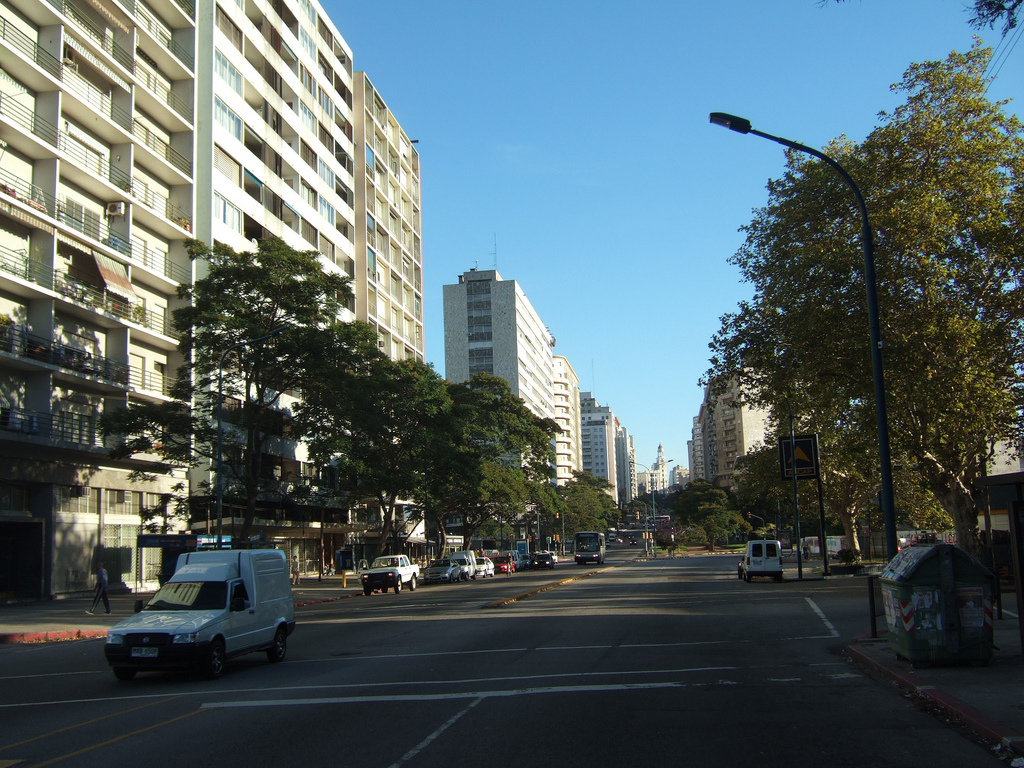
Aguada neighbourhood

== Landmarks ==
The main landmarks across this avenue are:

- Plaza Fabini
- Banco de Seguros del Estado
- Automóvil Club del Uruguay
- Edificio ANCAP
- Tiendas Introzzi
- Basílica Nuestra Señora del Carmen
- Instituto de Profesores Artigas
- Palacio Legislativo
