= Santa Bernardina =

- Suburb of Durazno
- Location in Uruguay
- Coordinates: 33°21′0″S 56°31′0″W
- Country: Uruguay
- Department: Durazno Department

Population (2011)
  - Total: 1,094
- Time zone: UTC -3
- Postal code: 97006
- Dial plan: +598 436 (+5 digits)

Santa Bernardina is a suburb of Durazno, the capital city of Durazno Department, in central Uruguay.

== Geography ==
This suburb is located to the north of the city of Durazno, across the river Río Yí. Directly east of the suburb is the Santa Bernardina International Airport.

== Population ==
In 2011, Santa Bernardina had a population of 1,094.

Year	Population
1963	887
1975	1,441
1985	1,371
1996	1,243
2004	1,333
2011	1,094

Source: Instituto Nacional de Estadística de Uruguay
