= The Rural Society of Durazno =

The Rural Society of Durazno is a prominent Uruguayan grouping of landowners and economic actors in Durazno Department.

== Activities and events ==
Livestock raising is a major portion of the region's economy, for the interests of which the Society, itself founded in 1911, is a major representative.

In 2008 the Society organized its 95th annual cattle show.

== Leadership ==
Among the more prominent figures in the Society's leadership is Dr. Santiago Bordaberry. A wide range of herds is represented in the Society (Bordaberry's personal cattle specialism is an Australian herd).

== See also ==
- Agriculture in Uruguay
- Durazno Department § Notable people
- es:Santiago Bordaberry
