= Blanquillo, Uruguay =

Blanquillo
- Village
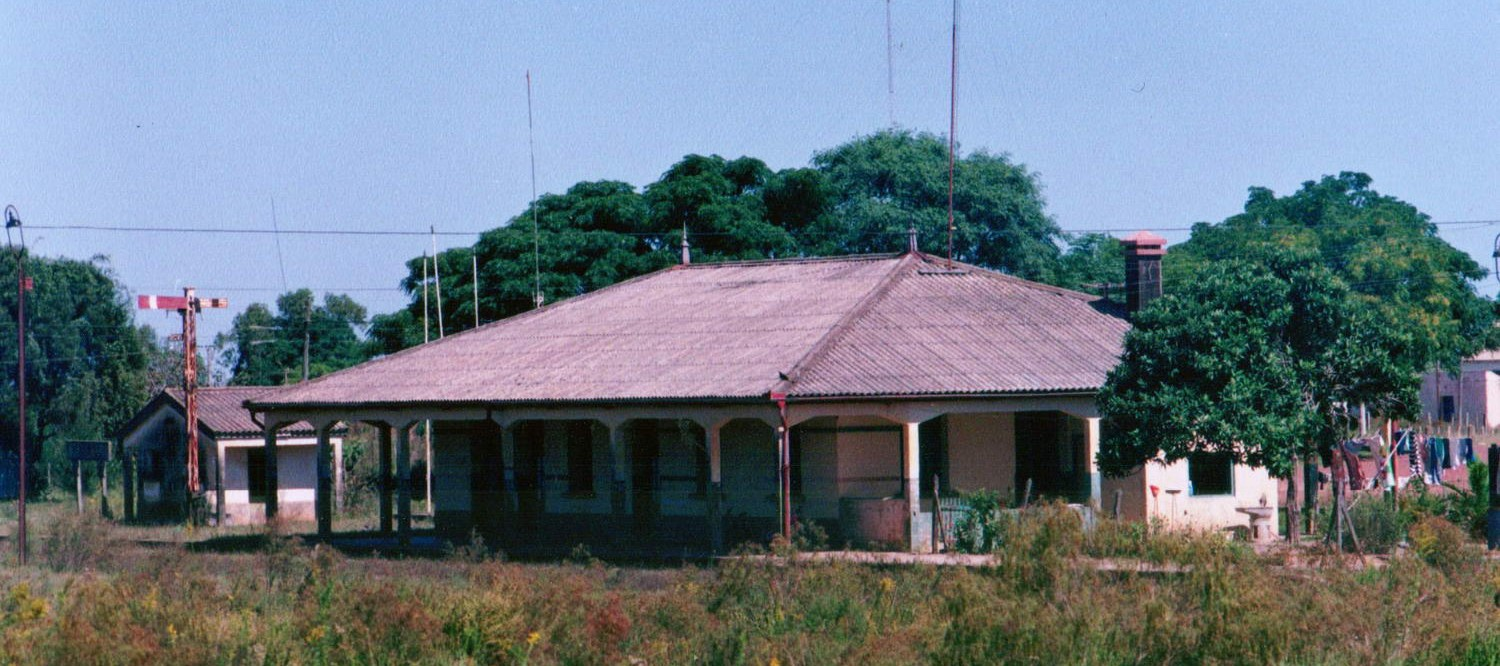
- The train station at Blanquillo

- Location in Uruguay
- Coordinates: 32°53′0″S 55°37′0″W
- Country: Uruguay
- Department: Durazno Department

Population (2011)
  - Total: 1,084
- Time zone: UTC -3
- Postal code: 97002
- Dial plan: +598 436 (+5 digits)

Blanquillo is a village in the Durazno Department of central Uruguay.

== Geography ==
The village is located on Route 43, about 32 kilometres (20 mi) north-northwest of its junction with Route 6. The railroad track that joins Florida with La Paloma pass through the town.

== History ==
On 17 November 1964, its status was elevated to "Pueblo" (village) by the Act of Ley Nº 13.299.

== Population ==
In 2011, it had a population of 1,084.

Year	Population
1908	3,528
1963	1,008
1975	1,053
1985	987
1996	1,099
2004	1,162
2011	1,084

Source: Instituto Nacional de Estadística de Uruguay
