= Plaza Fabini =

Plaza del Entrevero
- Plaza
- Plaza Fabini
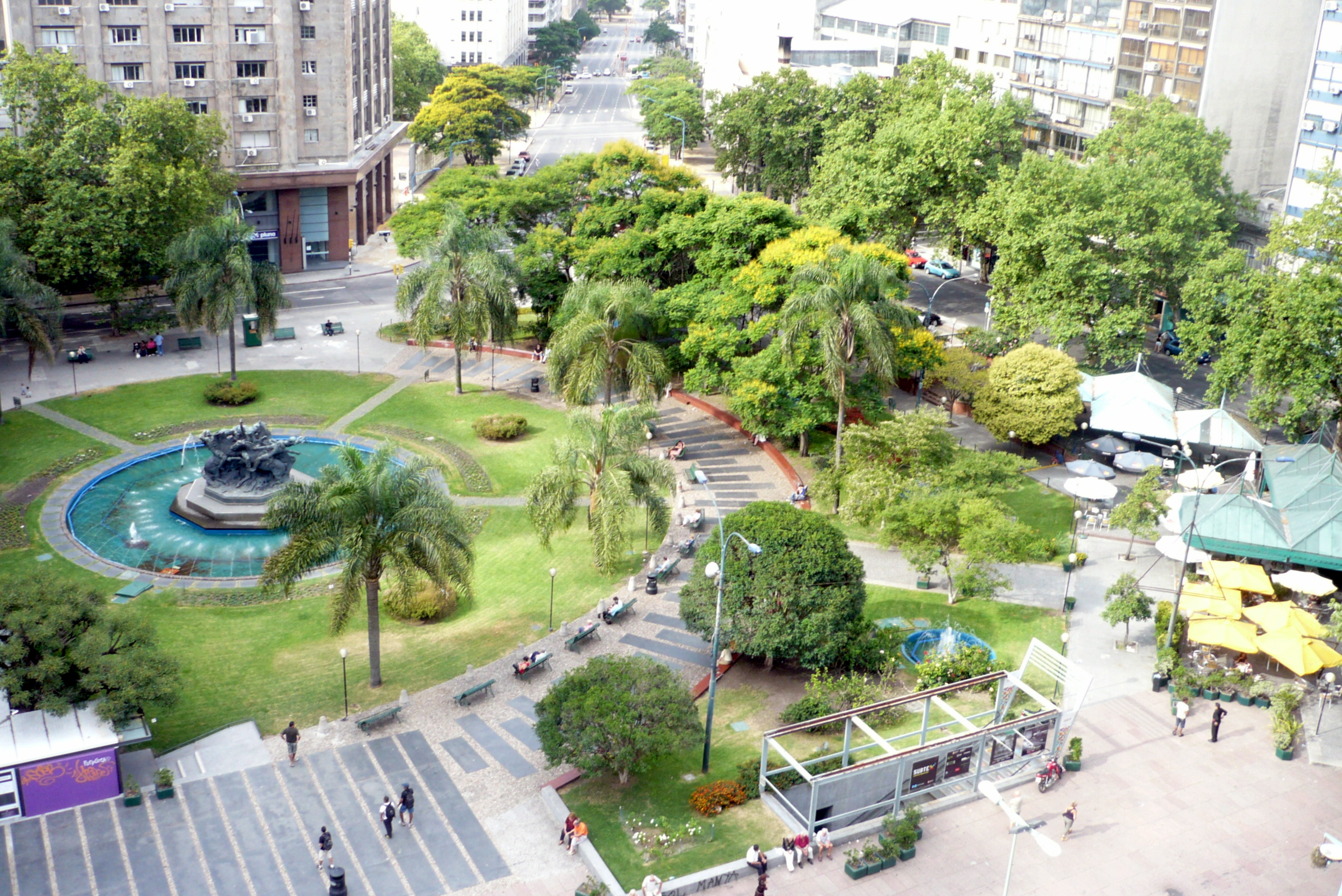
- Interactive map of Plaza del Entrevero
- Coordinates: 34°54′20″S 56°11′39″W
- Country: Uruguay
- Department: Montevideo Department
- City: Montevideo
- Barrio: Centro

Plaza Fabini (Spanish for 'Fabini Square') also known as Plaza del Entrevero, is a public square in the central business district of Montevideo, Uruguay. Located on 18 de Julio Avenue, on its north side starts Libertador Avenue.

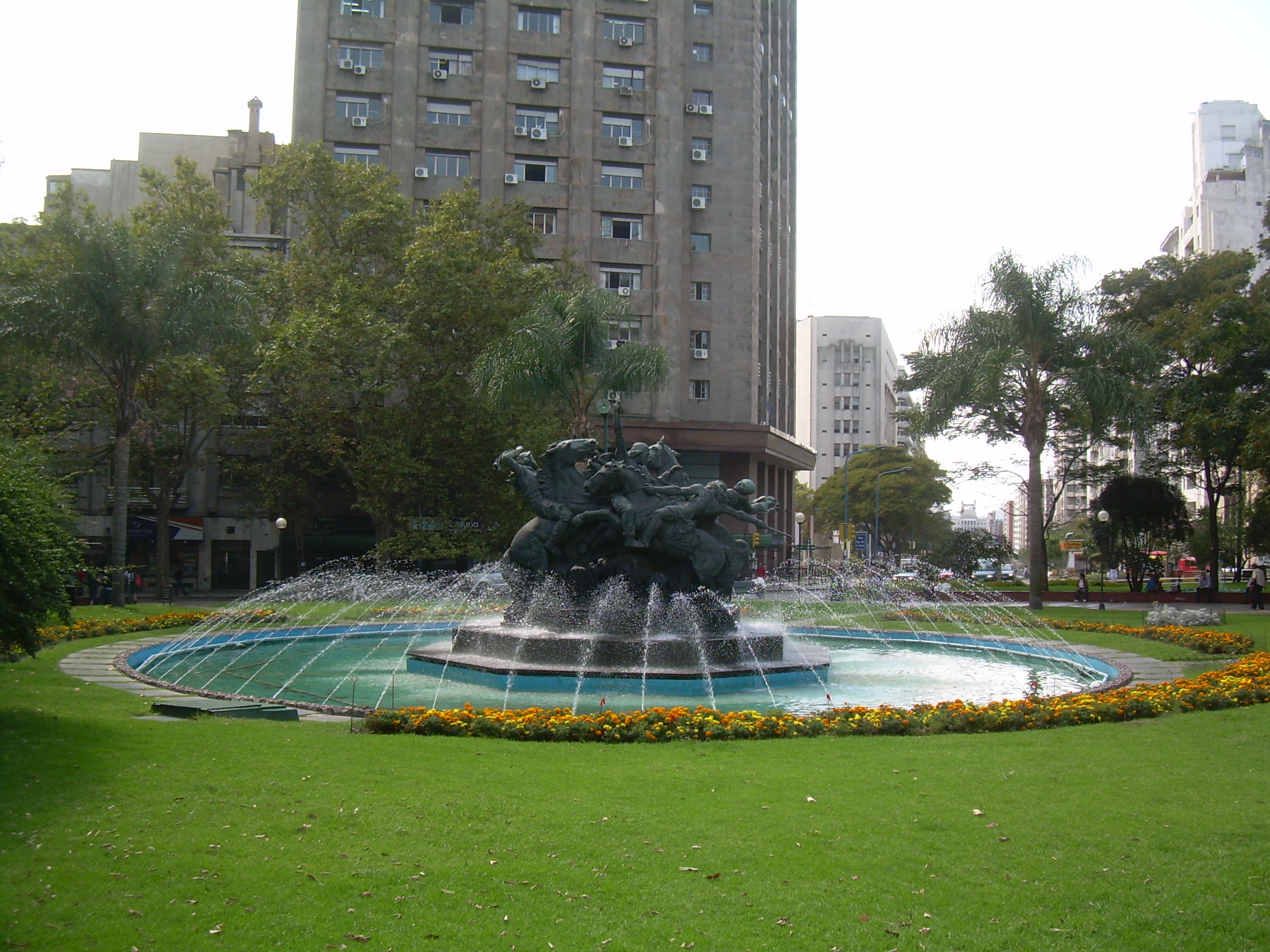
El Entrevero fountain in Plaza Fabini

Its main fountain has a bronze sculpture of José Belloni called 'El Entrevero', which acts as the monument to the unknown soldier. Under the square, there is a municipal exposition area called Subte Municipal.
