= La Paloma, Durazno =

La Paloma
- Village
- Location in Uruguay
- Coordinates: 32°44′0″S 55°35′0″W
- Country: Uruguay
- Department: Durazno Department

Population (2011)
  - Total: 1,443
- Time zone: UTC -3
- Postal code: 97004
- Dial plan: +598 436 (+5 digits)

La Paloma is a village in the Durazno Department of central Uruguay.

== Geography ==
The village is located 16 kilometres (9.9 mi) into a secondary road that splits off Route 6 in a westward direction at about 78 kilometres (48 mi) north of Sarandí del Yí. A train station of the railroad track from Sarandí del Yí to the north end of the department is 3 kilometres (1.9 mi) east of the village.

== History ==
Its status was elevated to "Pueblo" (village) on 3 May 1984 by the Act of Ley Nº 15.542.

== Population ==
In 2011, it had a population of 1,443.

Year	Population
1963	1,539
1975	1,554
1985	1,242
1996	1,373
2004	1,547
2011	1,443

Source: Instituto Nacional de Estadística de Uruguay

== Places of worship ==
- Parish Church of the Sacred Heart (Roman Catholic)
