= Aguada, Montevideo =

Aguada
- Barrio
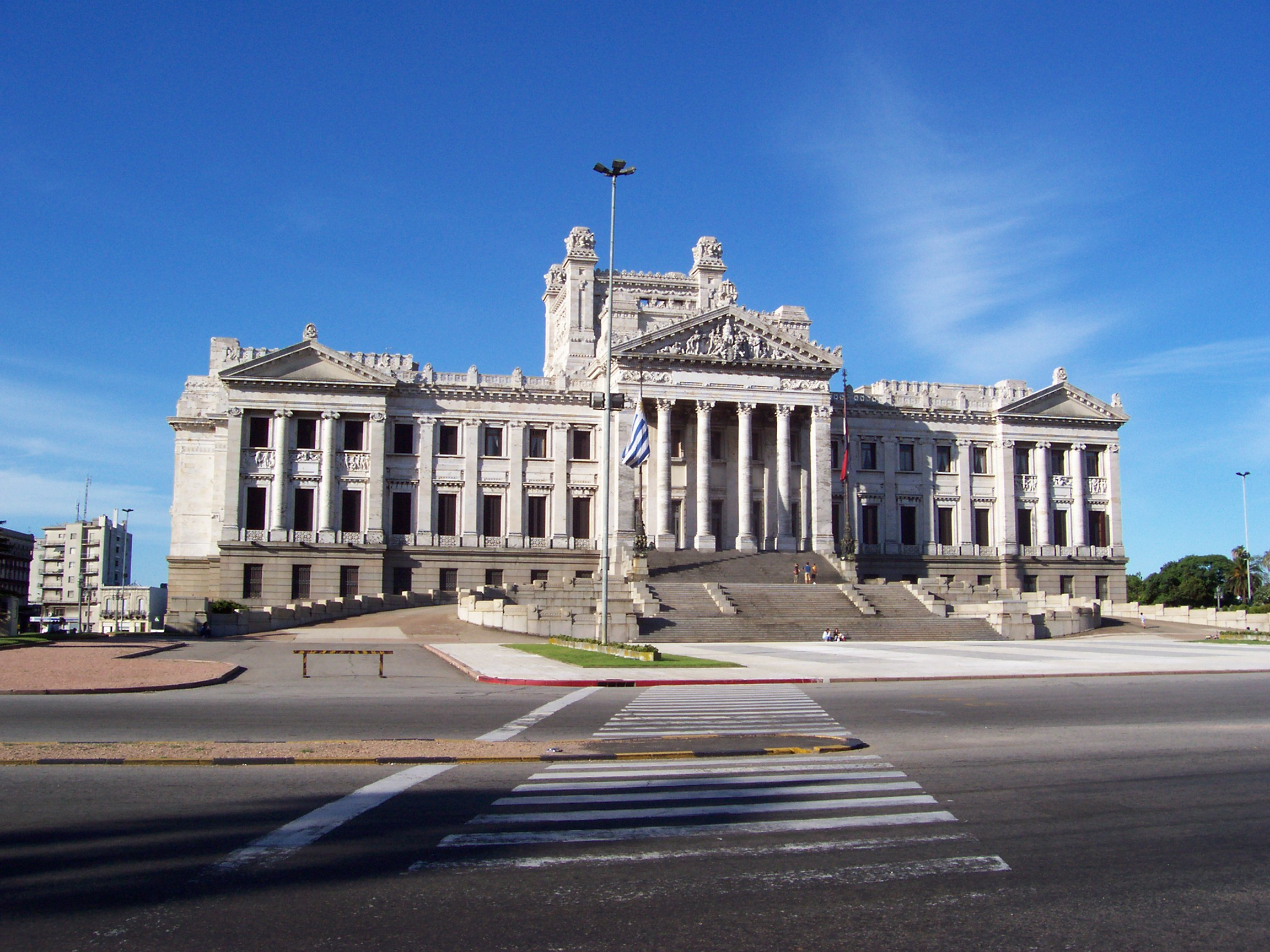
- The Palacio Legislativo

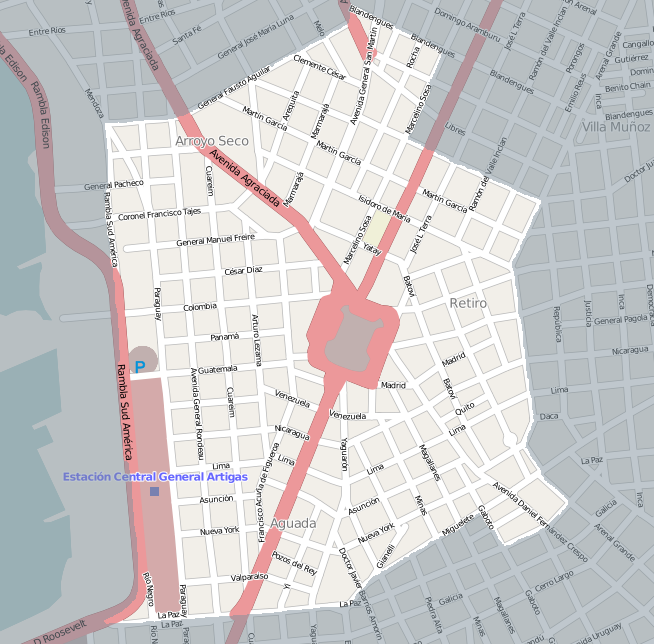
- Street map of Aguada

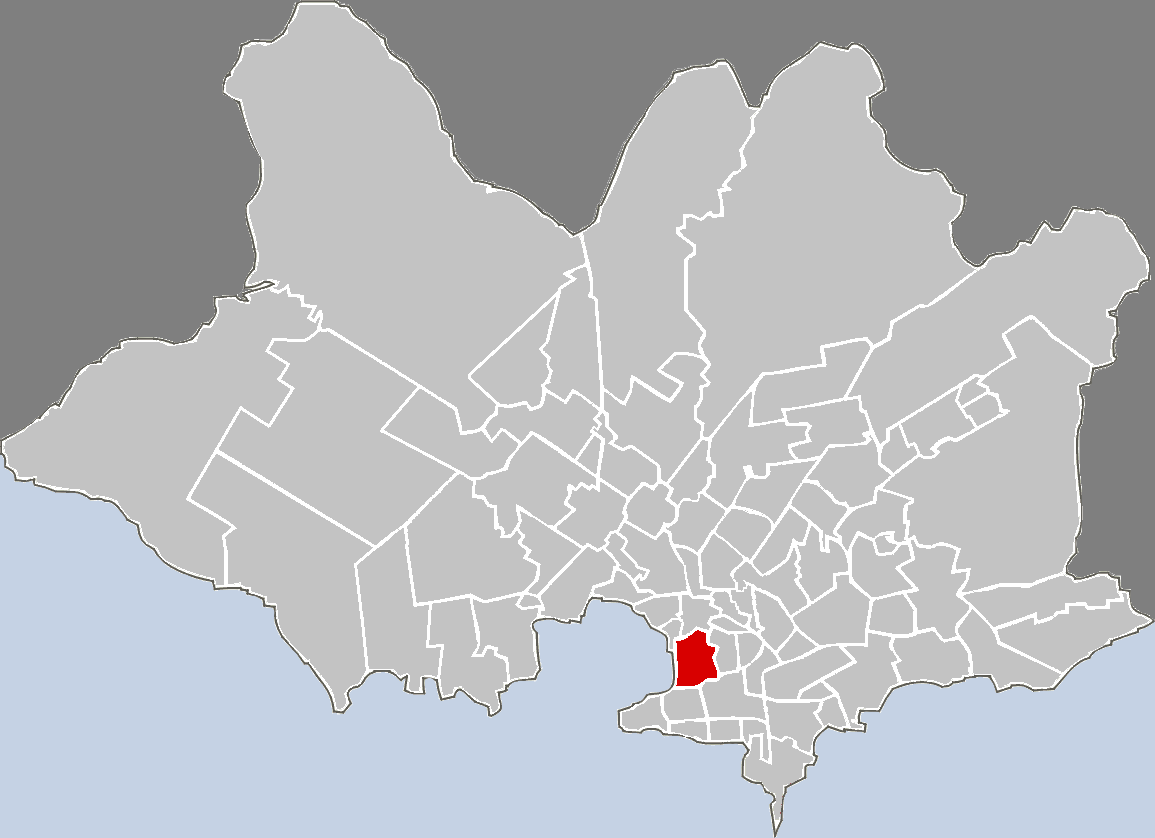
- Location of Aguada in Montevideo
- Coordinates: 34°53′35″S 56°11′22″W
- Country: Uruguay
- Department: Montevideo Department
- City: Montevideo

Aguada is a barrio (neighbourhood or district) of Montevideo, Uruguay. Its name indicates water flow and originates from the springs and well it used to have which supplied the original city and the boats with drinking water.

== Location ==
Aguada borders Centro and Cordón on the south, Villa Muñoz to the east, Reducto and Bella Vista to the north and the port of Montevideo (which belongs to Ciudad Vieja) on the west. Its name indicates water flow and originates from the springs and well it used to have which supplied the original city and the boats with drinking water. Most of its west side is an industrial area.

== Buildings ==
Aguada is home to the Palacio Legislativo, the Telecommunications Tower (Montevideo), the old Estación Central General Artigas, the Faculties of Medicine and of Chemistry of the University of the Republic, the Basílica Nuestra Señora del Carmen (Iglesia de la Aguada) and the headquarters of the state-owned ANCAP and Banco de Seguros del Estado.

== Places of worship ==
- Parish Church of Our Lady of Mount Carmel, popularly known as "Iglesia de la Aguada"; Av. del Libertador 2022 (Roman Catholic)
- Parish Church of Our Lady of the Guard, Porongos 2278 (Roman Catholic, Sons of Divine Providence)

== Climate ==
Climate is characterized by relatively high temperatures and evenly distributed precipitation throughout the year. According to the Köppen Climate Classification system, Aguada has a humid subtropical climate, abbreviated "Cfa" on climate maps.

== Bibliography ==
- Assunção, Fernando O.; Bombet Franco, Iris (1991). La Aguada. Cuadernos del Boston (in Spanish). Vol. 2. Montevideo.

== See also ==
- Barrios of Montevideo
