= Santa Bernardina International Airport =

Santa Bernardina International Airport Tte. 2° Mario W. Parallada Air Base
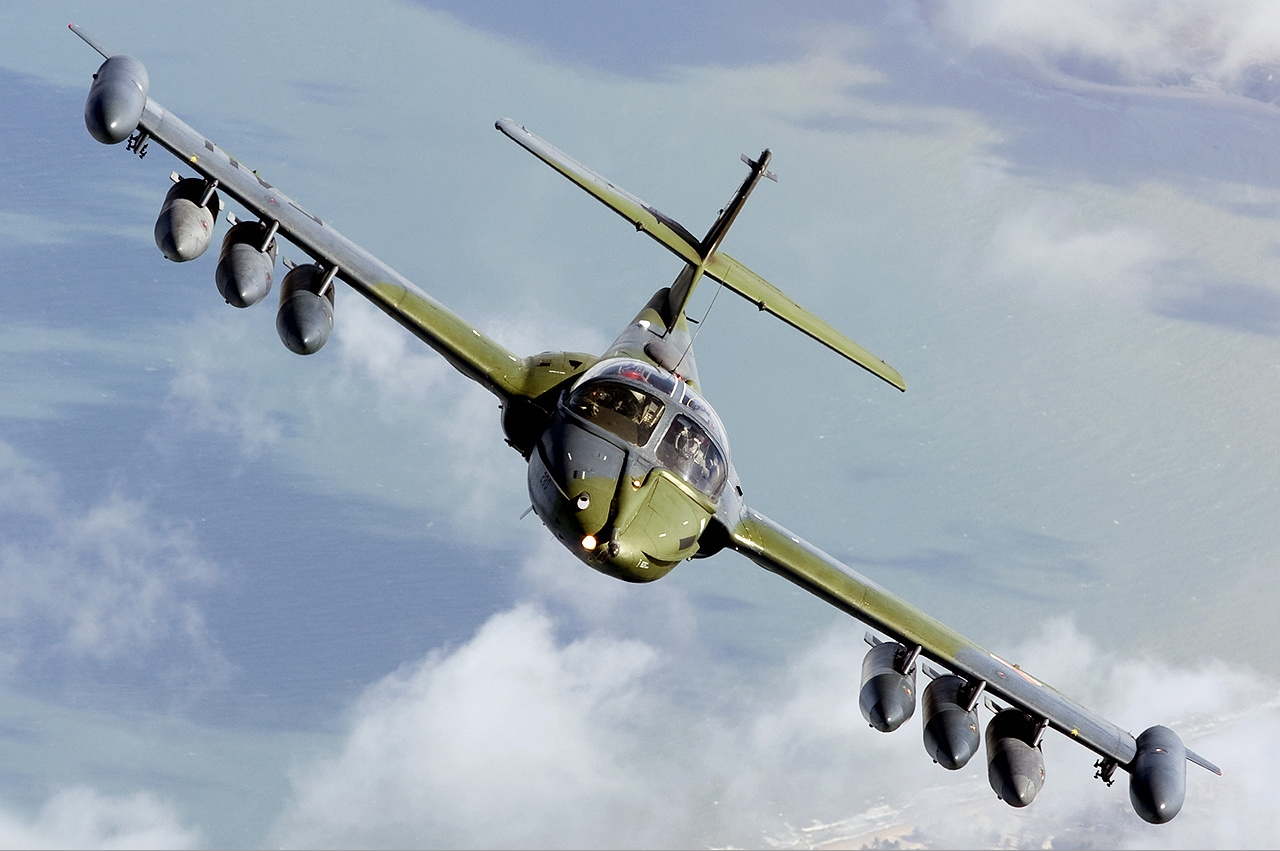
- Uruguayan Air Force OA-37B
- IATA: DZO; ICAO: SUDU

Summary
- Airport type: Public/Military
- Operator: Aeropuertos Uruguay
- Serves: Durazno, Uruguay
- Elevation AMSL: 305 ft / 93 m
- Coordinates: 33°21′35″S 56°30′00″W

Map
- Location in Uruguay

Runways
Direction	Length		Surface
Direction	m	ft	Surface
03/21	2,285	7,497	Concrete/Asphalt
10/28	1,450	4,757	Asphalt
- Sources: SkyVector, GCM

Santa Bernardina International Airport (Spanish: Aeropuerto Internacional Santa Bernardina) (IATA: DZO, ICAO: SUDU) is a military and general aviation airport serving Durazno in the Durazno Department of Uruguay. The facilities are shared with the Tte. 2° Mario W. Parallada Air Base of the Uruguayan Air Force.

== Location ==
The airport is located in the locality of Santa Bernardina in Durazno in the Durazno Department in central Uruguay. The airport is located approximately 4 mi (6.4 km) northeast from downtown Durazno.

== History ==
In July 2023, a new radar system was installed at a cost of US$4 million at the airport. The airport subsequently underwent a full modernisation programme as part of the Sistema Nacional de Aeropuertos Internacionales (National System of International Airports) at a cost of US$12 million. Works carried out as a part of the programme include the construction of a new passenger terminal, a new taxiway and apron, a car park, a perimeter fence and access road, refurbishment of the fire station and police facilities. The renovated airport was inaugurated on 10 February 2025 by Uruguayan president Luis Lacalle Pou, in the presence of other officials and the commander-in-chief of the Uruguayan Air Force. It was the sixth and final airport to be modernised by Aeropuertos Uruguay, as a part of the modernization programme.

== Infrastructure ==
The airport has two runways. The primary runway is designated 03/21, measuring 2,279 m (7,477 ft) long and 45 m (148 ft) wide and has an asphalt surface. A secondary runway designated 10/28 measures 1,452 m (4,764 ft) long and 30 m (98 ft) wide. Tower and approach communications are conducted on frequencies 120.40 and 126.20. An ILS Category I instrument landing system is installed on the threshold of the runway 21, and an ADS-B radar covering the entire national airspace is located at the airport. The Durazno VOR-DME (Ident: DUR, frequency 117.50) is located on the field.

== Air base ==
Tte. 2° Mario W. Parallada Air Base is a base of the Uruguayan Air Force that shares facilities at the airport. The Air Brigade No. 2 is stationed at the base and operates Cessna A-37 Dragonfly and Embraer EMB 314 Super Tucano aircraft.

== Airlines and destinations ==
As of early 2026, there are no scheduled passenger airline services to or from the airport.

== See also ==
- Transport in Uruguay
- List of airports in Uruguay
- Tte. 2° Mario W. Parallada Air Base - Spanish Wikipedia
