= Villa del Carmen =

Villa del Carmen Carmen
- Town
- Location in Uruguay
- Coordinates: 33°14′25″S 56°00′46″W
- Country: Uruguay
- Department: Durazno Department
- Founded: 1874
- Elevation: 163 m (535 ft)

Population (2011)
  - Total: 2,692
- Time zone: UTC-03:00 (UYT)
- Postal code: 97000
- Dial plan: +598 4365 (+4 digits)

Villa del Carmen or Carmen is a town in Durazno Department of central Uruguay, the third largest populated place in the department, after Durazno and Sarandí del Yí.

== Geography ==
The town is located on the intersection of Routes 14 and 42, about 55 kilometres (34 mi) east of the city of Durazno.

== History ==
Carmen was founded on 10 June 1874 by a decree of President of Uruguay, José Eugenio Ellauri. A principal contribution to the town's economic development was the carpentery industry, as well as the wines produced by André Faraud in the beginning of the 20th century.

On 4 July 1908, its status was elevated to "Pueblo" (village) and was given the name "Pueblo del Carmen" by the Act of Ley Nº 3.305. On 29 April 1975, its status was raised to "Villa" (town) by the Act of Ley Nº 14.363.

== Population ==
In 2011, Villa del Carmen had a population of 2,692.

Year	Population
1908	3,598
1963	2,356
1975	2,410
1985	2,208
1996	2,284
2004	2,661
2011	2,692

Source: Instituto Nacional de Estadística de Uruguay

== Noted features ==
Parque Francisco Davant is named after Francisco Davant, a local political figure distinguished by his sponsorship of tree planting, serves local residents and tourists. The park contains a variety of trees, the planting of which date from the 1950s.

== Places of worship ==
- Parish Church of Our Lady of Mt. Carmel (Roman Catholic)
