= Banco de Seguros del Estado =

State Insurance Bank

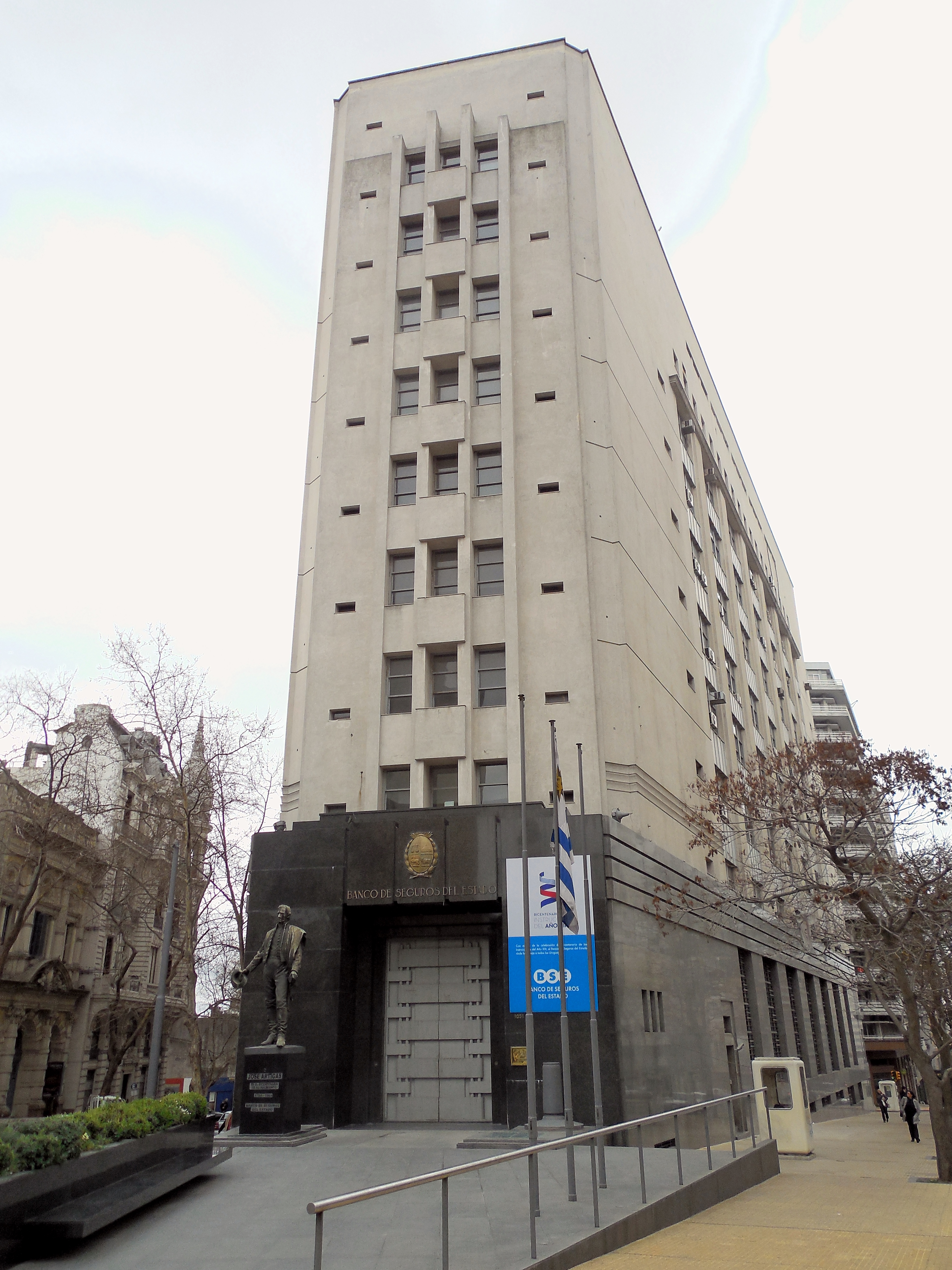
- BSE Headquarters, Montevideo
- Native name: Banco de Seguros del Estado
- Company type: State-owned insurance company (Autonomous State Entity)
- Founded: December 27, 1911; 114 years ago
- Key people: Marcos Otheguy (president); Alfonsina Batalla (Vice President); Juan José Bruno (Director)
- Website: www.bse.com.uy

The State Insurance Bank (Spanish: Banco de Seguros del Estado, acronym BSE) is a Uruguayan government-owned insurance company that provides insurance in Uruguay. Established on 27 December 1911, it operates under the Ministry of Economy and Finance, and is controlled by the Court of Accounts and the Central Bank. It is an Autonomous State Entity with commercial and social purposes, as a state-owned enterprise with high decentralization.

== History ==
The State Insurance Bank was created on December 27, 1911, by Law No. 3,935, within the framework of the statist reforms carried out by President José Batlle y Ordoñez. The objective of the nationalization was that the profits from the market would remain in the country, since none of the insurance companies that operated in the territory were Uruguayan.

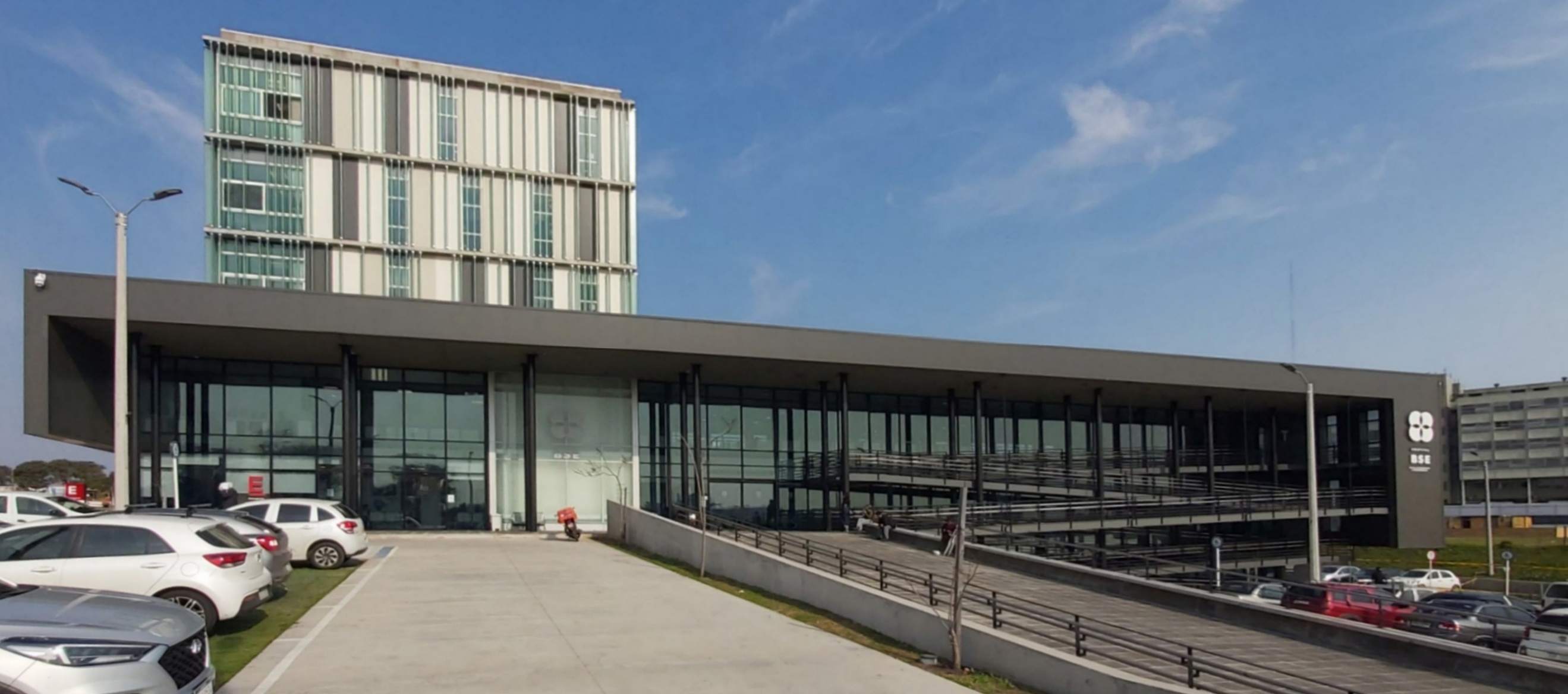
BSE Hospital in Montevideo

In 1951, the Sanatorium of the State Insurance Bank was inaugurated, a public hospital center dependent on the entity, and dedicated to the direct attention to work-related accidents and illnesses. In 2018, a new building located in barrio Bolívar was inaugurated. The hospital's medical care is nationwide, specializing in the treatment of amputated limbs, spinal cord injuries, severe multiple injuries, and traumatic brain injuries.

In 1993, through Law No. 16,426 insurances were demonopolized —except in the case of workplace accidents—, and a process of deregulation began in a market open to access by foreign companies.

== Headquarters ==
The main offices of the Bank are located in the building located at the intersection of Libertador Avenue and Mercedes Street. Designed by Ítalo Dighiero and Beltrán Arbeleche in a modernist style, it was inaugurated in 1940.
