= Sarandí del Yí =

- City
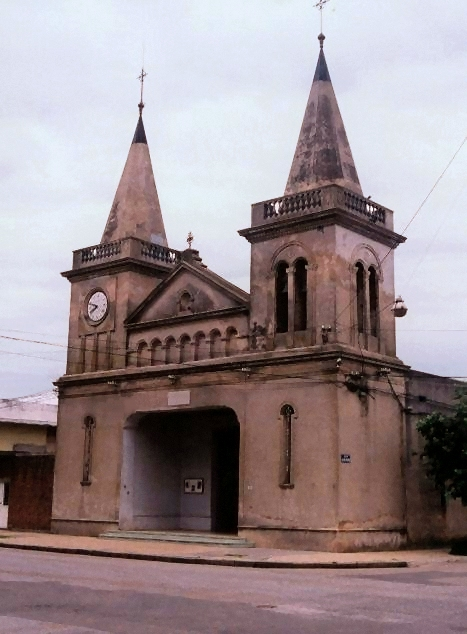
- The church of Sarandí del Yi

- Location in Uruguay
- Coordinates: 33°20′0″S 55°38′0″W
- Country: Uruguay
- Department: Durazno
- Founded: 1875

Population (2011 Census)
  - Total: 7,176
- Time zone: UTC -3
- Postal code: 97100
- Dial plan: +598 4367 (+4 digits)

Sarandí del Yí is a city in the Durazno Department of central Uruguay.

== Geography ==
It is located on the north bank of the river Río Yi, and on the intersection of Route 6 with Route 14, about 95 kilometres (59 mi) east of Durazno, the capital of the department. The nearest populated centre, 18 kilometres (11 mi) to the south, is the small town of Capilla del Sauce of the Florida Department.

== History ==
A "Pueblo" (village) was founded here on 19 December 1875. On 13 June 1906 its status was elevated to "Villa" (town) by the Act of Ley N° 3.041, and then on 23 August 1956, to "Ciudad" (city) by the Act of Ley N° 12.308.

== Population ==
In 2011 Sarandí del Yí had a population of 7,176.

Year	Population
1908	3,988
1963	5,882
1975	6,355
1985	5,910
1996	6,662
2004	7,289
2011	7,176

Source: Instituto Nacional de Estadística de Uruguay

== Places of worship ==
- St. Anthony of Padua Parish Church (Roman Catholic)

== Sports ==
The city is home to Club Nacional de Fútbol (Sarandí del Yi), an athletics club founded in 1911.
