= San Gregorio de Polanco =

- City
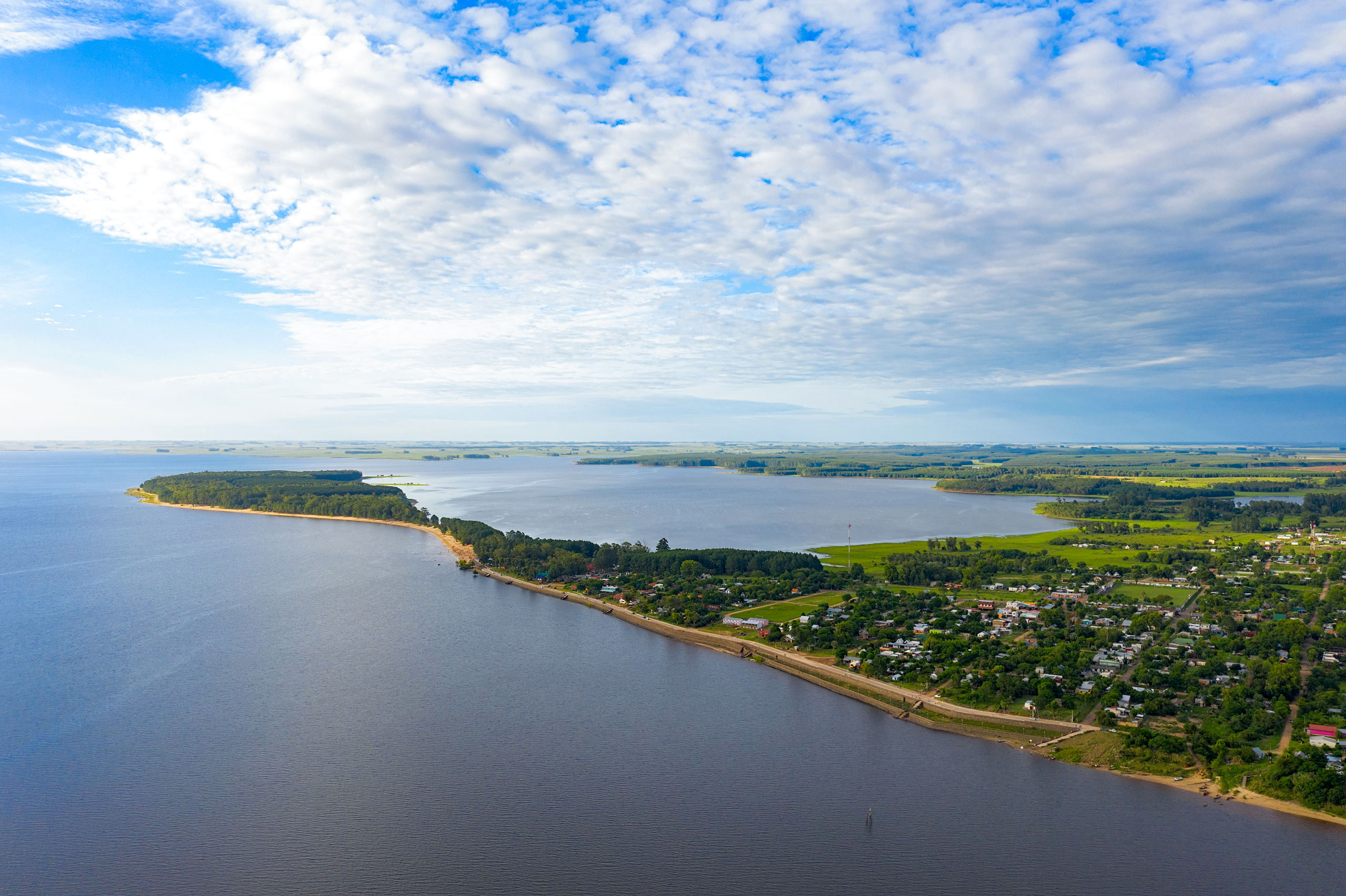
- San Gregorio de Polanco, Uruguay

- Location in Uruguay
- Coordinates: 32°37′0″S 55°50′0″W
- Country: Uruguay
- Department: Tacuarembó Department
- Founded: 1853

Population (2011 Census)
  - Total: 3,415
- Time zone: UTC -3
- Postal code: 45200
- Dial plan: +598 4369 (+4 digits)

San Gregorio de Polanco is a small city in the Tacuarembó Department of northern-central Uruguay.

== Geography ==
The city is located on a peninsula on the north shore of the artificial Rincón del Bonete Lake and along Route 43, about 140 kilometres (87 mi) south of the department capital city of Tacuarembó. Route 43 passes across the lake to Durazno Department by ferryboat.

== History ==
It was founded on 27 November 1853. On 13 October 1963, its status was elevated to "Villa" (town) by the Act of Ley Nº 13.167, and then on 13 December 1994 to "Ciudad" (city) by the Act of Ley Nº 16.666.

In 1945, the artificial lake of Rincon del Bonete hugely changed the landscape of this town, adding a water surface and, later, beaches.

== Population ==
In 2011, San Gregorio de Polanco had a population of 3,415.

Year	Population
1908	6,004
1963	2,489
1975	2,877
1985	2,856
1996	3,101
2004	3,673
2011	3,415

Source: Instituto Nacional de Estadística de Uruguay

== Places of worship ==
- Parish Church of Our Lady of Mt. Carmel
