= Capilla del Sauce =

- Town
- Location in Uruguay
- Coordinates: 33°28′0″S 55°37′50″W
- Country: Uruguay
- Department: Florida Department

Population (2011)
  - Total: 835
- Time zone: UTC -3
- Postal code: 94008
- Dial plan: +598 4318 (+4 digits)

Capilla del Sauce is a small town in the north part of Florida Department of central Uruguay.

== Geography ==
It is located on Km. 190 of Route 6, about 18 kilometres (11 mi) south of Sarandí del Yí of Durazno Department.

== History ==
The group of houses of this area was declared a village on 26 May 1924, by decree Ley N° 7.718. On 5 July 1956, its status was elevated to "Villa" (town) by decree Ley N° 12.298.

== Population ==
In 2011 Capilla del Sauce had a population of 835.

| Year | Population |
|---|---|
| 1963 | 604 |
| 1975 | 777 |
| 1985 | 670 |
| 1996 | 775 |
| 2004 | 877 |
| 2011 | 835 |

Source: Instituto Nacional de Estadística de Uruguay

== Places of worship ==
- Parish Church of Our Lady of Mt. Carmel (Roman Catholic)
