= Virgen del Carmen y Santa Teresita, Montevideo =

Church building in Montevideo, Uruguay

Coordinates: 34.8647°S 56.2038°W

Virgen del Carmen y Santa Teresita (Carmelitas)
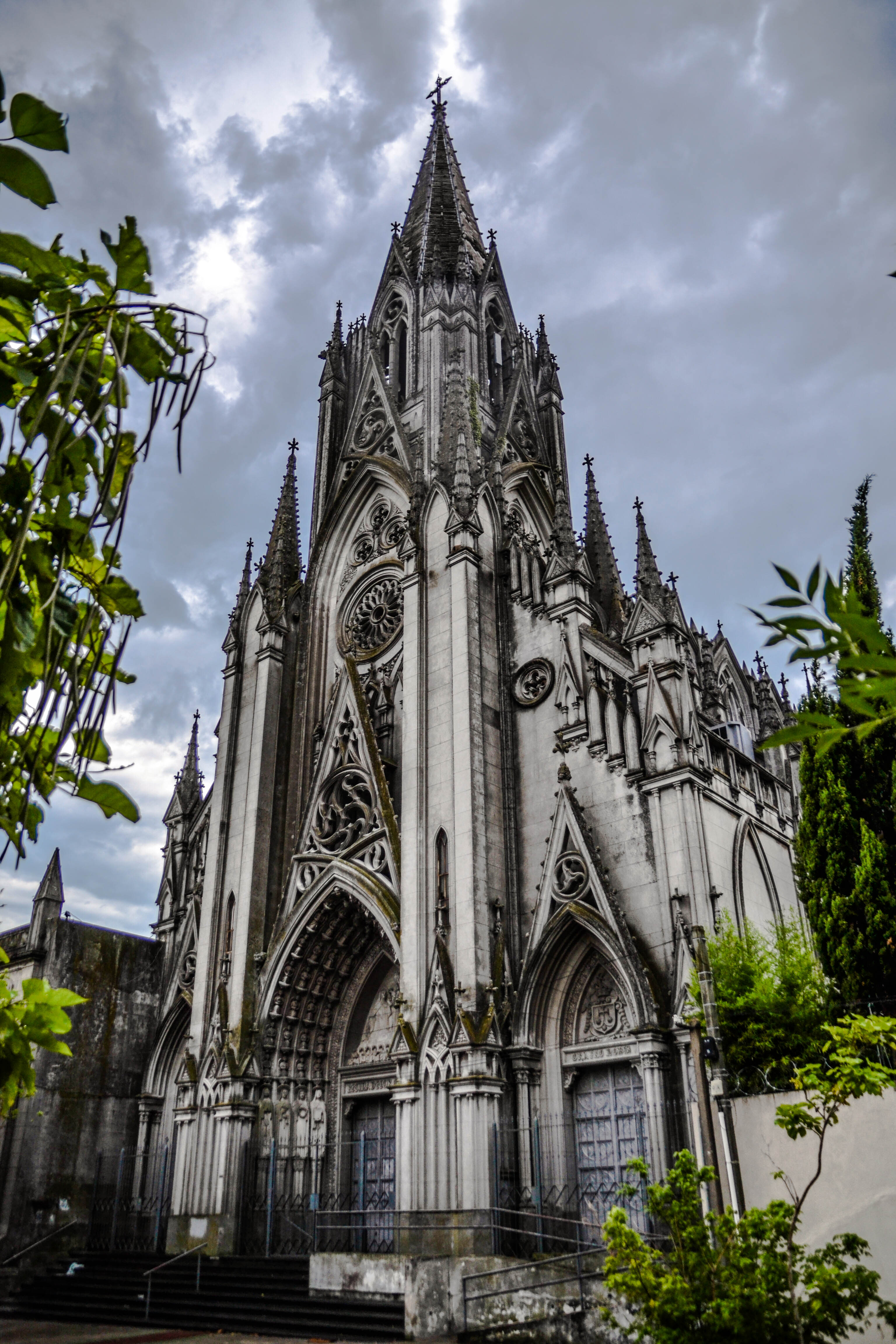

Religion
- Affiliation: Roman Catholic
- Ecclesiastical or organizational status: Parish church
- Year consecrated: 1954

Location
- Location: Irigoitía 1007; Montevideo, Uruguay
- Interactive map of Virgen del Carmen y Santa Teresita (Carmelitas)

Architecture
- Architects: Guillermo Armas, Albérico Isola
- Type: Church
- Style: Neo-Gothic

The Church of the Virgin of Mount Carmen and St. Thérèse of Lisieux (Spanish: Iglesia de la Virgen del Carmen y Santa Teresita), also known as Iglesia de los Carmelitas, is a Roman Catholic parish church in the neighbourhood of Prado, Montevideo, Uruguay.

The church was built in Neo-Gothic style by architects Guillermo Armas and Albérico Isola, between 1929 and 1954. It was held by the Carmelites until 1995, then it was leased to the Archdiocese. The church is dedicated to Our Lady of Mount Carmel and Saint Thérèse of Lisieux.

The parish was established on 8 September 1962.
