= Durazno Department =

Department of Uruguay

Durazno
- Department
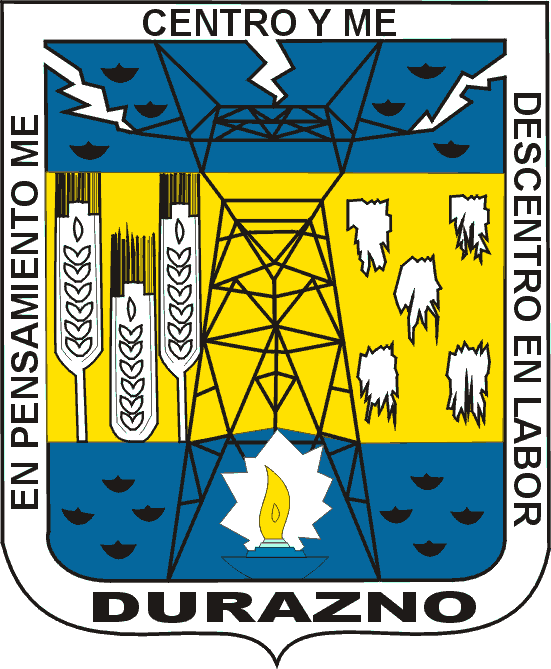
- Flag Coat of arms

- Location of Durazno Department in Uruguay
- Coordinates (Durazno): 33°22′S 56°31′W
- Country: Uruguay
- Inception: 1822
- Capital of Department: Durazno

Government
  - Intendant: Carmelo Vidalín
  - Ruling party: Partido Nacional

Area
  - Total: 11,643 km^{2} (4,495 sq mi)
- Elevation: 143 m (469 ft)

Population (2023 census)
  - Total: 62,011
  - Density: 5.3260/km^{2} (13.794/sq mi)
- Demonym: Duraznense
- Time zone: UTC-3 (UYT)
- ISO 3166 code: UY-DU
- Website: durazno.gub.uy

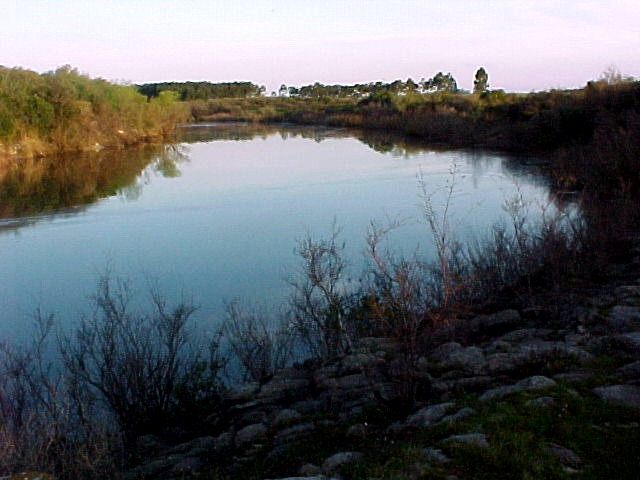
The Yí River in Durazno Department

Durazno (Spanish pronunciation: [duˈɾasno]; Uruguayan Spanish: [duˈɾahno]) is a department of Uruguay. Its capital is Durazno. Its name means "peach" in Spanish, referring to the department's peaches and its status as an agricultural breadbasket. It is located in the centre of the country, and is bounded to the north by the Río Negro and the Río Yi to the South. To its north are the departments of Río Negro and Tacuarembó, to it southeast the departments of Treinta y Tres, to its south the departments of Flores and Florida, while on its east is the department of Cerro Largo.

== History ==
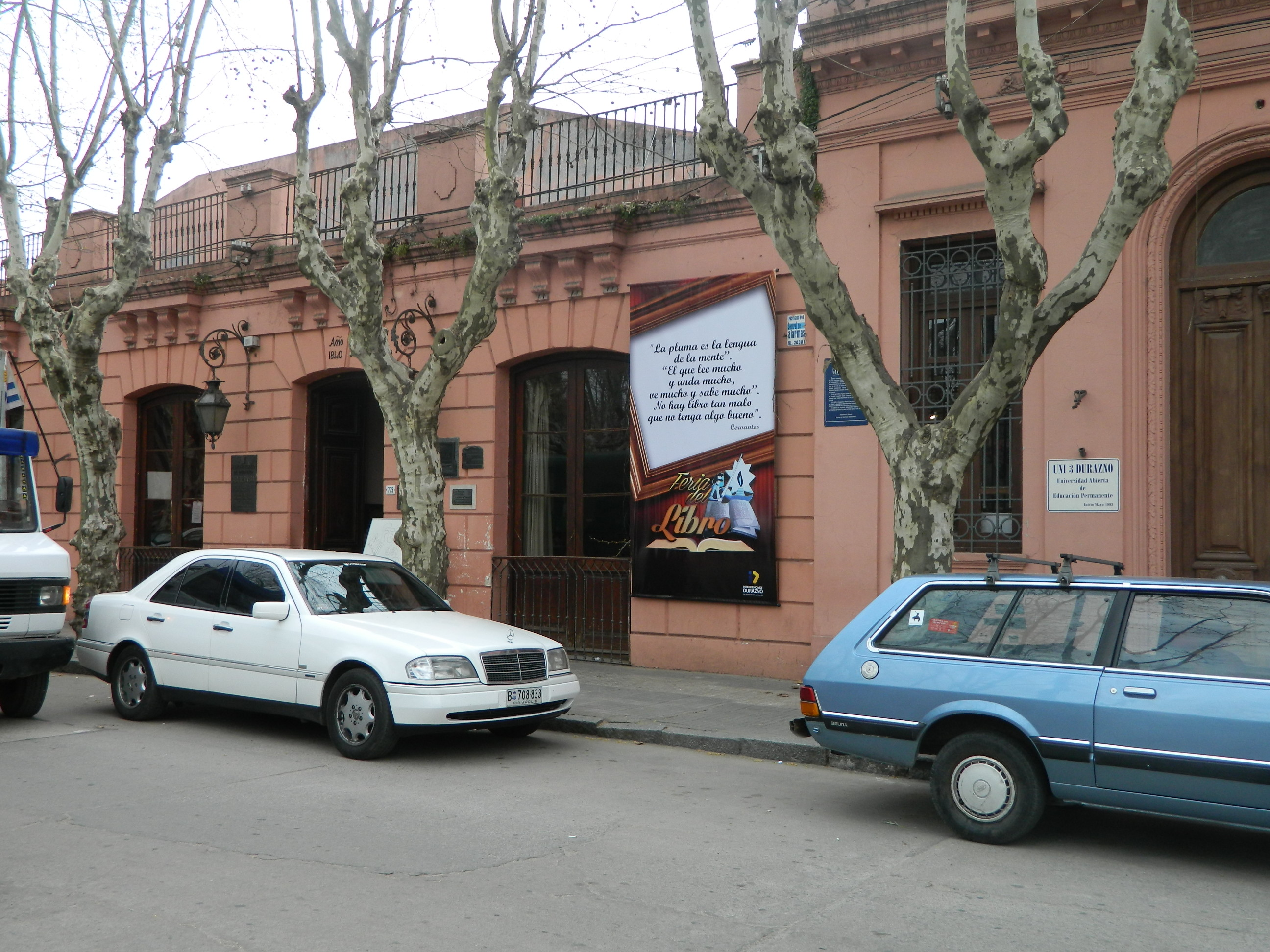
Rivera's house in Durazno, now a museum

In 1827, while the territory was under Portuguese dominion, the Portuguese asked their ally, General Fructuoso Rivera to establish a military body of cavalry and artillery in the area of Paso del Durazno on the banks of Río Yi. For this, the town of San Pedro del Durazno was founded, named after the regent of Brazil. In 1828 the department named "Entre Ríos Yí y Negro" was formed, which was soon after renamed to Durazno. When the First Constitution of Uruguay was signed in 1830, Durazno was one of the nine original departments of the Republic.

== Demographics ==
Ethnic groups in Durazno (2023 est.)
Ethnic groups	Percent
White	86.0%
Black	9.8%
Indigenous	5.4%
Asian	1.0%
None/Other/Unspecified	6.3%

As of the census of 2011, Durazno Department had a population of 57,088 (28,216 male and 28,872 female) and 23,023 households.

Demographic data for Florida Department in 2010:

- Population growth rate: 0.696%
- Birth Rate: 15.62 births/1,000 people
- Death Rate: 8.08 deaths/1,000 people
- Average age: 31.3 (30.6 male, 32.1 female)
- Life Expectancy at Birth:
  - Total population: 78.24 years
  - Male: 74.34 years
  - Female: 82.12 years
- Average per household income: 21,515 pesos/month
- Urban per capita income: 7,934 pesos/month

2010 Data Source:

Main Urban Centres
Other towns and villages
Population stated according to the 2011 census.

City / Town	Population
Durazno	34,368
Sarandí del Yí	7,176
Villa del Carmen	2,692
La Paloma	1,443
Centenario	1,136
Cerro Chato	1,124
Santa Bernardina	1,094
Blanquillo	1,084

Town / Village	Population
Carlos Reyles	976
San Jorge	502
Baygorria	161

Rural population

According to the 2011 census, Durazno department has a rural population of 4,951.

== Economy ==
The economy of Durazno largely depends on agriculture and agrotourism. The raising of sheep, and of cattle, both dairy and for beef are of great importance. The Rural Society of Durazno groups together many of the landowning businesses in the department.

In the 1930s the Government of Gabriel Terra undertook considerable hydroelectric development in the department.

== Map of the department ==
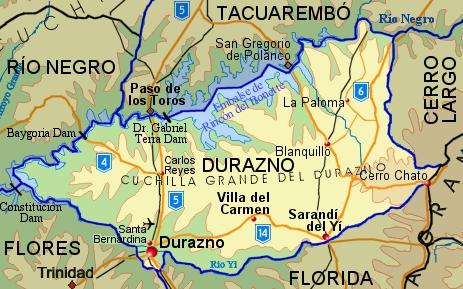
Topographic map of Durazno Department showing main populated places and roads

== Notable people ==
- Juan José de Amézaga served as a deputy for the department in the early years of the 20th century and later served as President of Uruguay from 1943 to 1947.
- Santiago Bordaberry, himself from a prominent political family, is a noted rural affairs activist in Durazno.
- Francisco Davant was a prominent local arboriculturist, active in local government. (see: Villa del Carmen)

== See also ==
- List of populated places in Uruguay#Durazno Department
