= Durazno =

Durazno, Uruguay
- Capital city
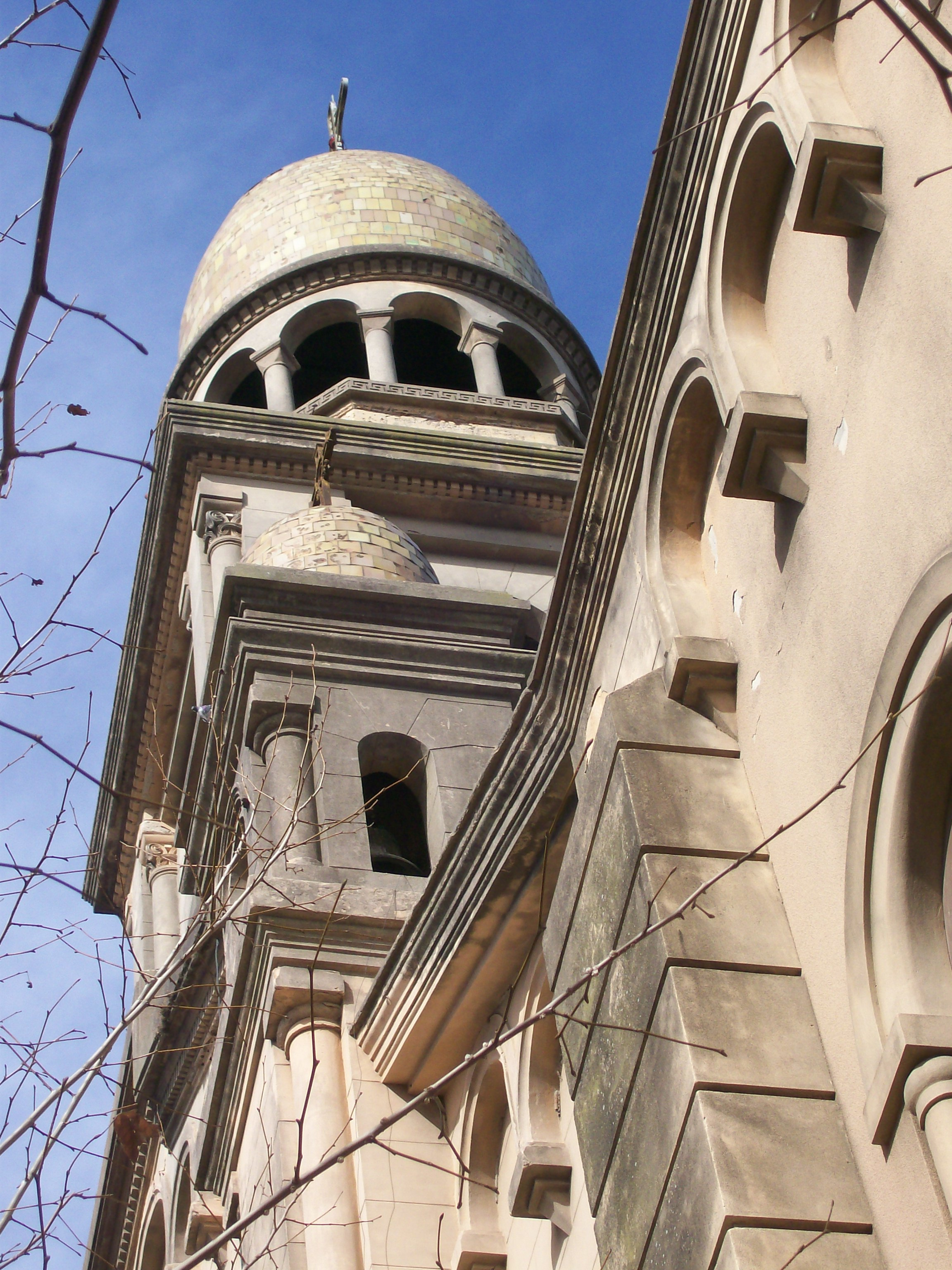
- Iglesia San Pedro

- Location within Uruguay
- Coordinates: 33°22′0″S 56°31′0″W
- Country: Uruguay
- Department: Durazno
- Founded: 1821

Area
  - Total: 30.5 km^{2} (11.8 sq mi)
- Elevation: 91 m (299 ft)

Population (2023 Census)
  - Total: 40,279
  - Density: 1,320/km^{2} (3,420/sq mi)
- Time zone: UTC -3
- Postal code: 97000
- Dial plan: +598 436 (+5 digits)
- Climate: Cfa
- Website: durazno.uy

Durazno is the capital city of the department of Durazno in Uruguay.

== Geography ==
The city is located at the intersection of Routes 5 and 41, in the south of the department, close to the borders with the departments of Flores to the southwest and Florida to the southeast. It is only 40 kilometres (25 mi) northeast of the city of Trinidad, capital of Flores department.

Durazno is situated on the south banks of the Yi River, a tributary to the Río Negro River.

=== Climate ===
Climate data for Durazno (1991–2020, extremes 1977–2020)
Month	Jan	Feb	Mar	Apr	May	Jun	Jul	Aug	Sep	Oct	Nov	Dec	Year
Record high °C (°F)	40.2 (104.4)	39.4 (102.9)	36.6 (97.9)	35.4 (95.7)	31.2 (88.2)	29.8 (85.6)	30.0 (86.0)	33.8 (92.8)	35.2 (95.4)	36.8 (98.2)	39.5 (103.1)	39.8 (103.6)	40.2 (104.4)
Mean daily maximum °C (°F)	30.6 (87.1)	29.3 (84.7)	27.4 (81.3)	23.7 (74.7)	19.5 (67.1)	16.5 (61.7)	15.9 (60.6)	18.3 (64.9)	19.9 (67.8)	22.7 (72.9)	26.1 (79.0)	28.9 (84.0)	23.2 (73.8)
Daily mean °C (°F)	23.7 (74.7)	23.0 (73.4)	21.1 (70.0)	17.7 (63.9)	14.1 (57.4)	11.4 (52.5)	10.7 (51.3)	12.5 (54.5)	13.9 (57.0)	16.8 (62.2)	19.4 (66.9)	22.0 (71.6)	17.1 (62.8)
Mean daily minimum °C (°F)	16.9 (62.4)	16.6 (61.9)	14.8 (58.6)	11.7 (53.1)	8.6 (47.5)	6.2 (43.2)	5.5 (41.9)	6.7 (44.1)	8.0 (46.4)	10.9 (51.6)	12.9 (55.2)	15.2 (59.4)	11.1 (52.0)
Record low °C (°F)	6.8 (44.2)	5.8 (42.4)	3.2 (37.8)	0.6 (33.1)	−3.4 (25.9)	−6.8 (19.8)	−6.0 (21.2)	−4.0 (24.8)	−4.5 (23.9)	−1.8 (28.8)	0.8 (33.4)	4.0 (39.2)	−6.8 (19.8)
Average precipitation mm (inches)	106.0 (4.17)	125.8 (4.95)	97.3 (3.83)	118.4 (4.66)	107.5 (4.23)	101.5 (4.00)	79.8 (3.14)	91.1 (3.59)	97.1 (3.82)	126.0 (4.96)	99.3 (3.91)	114.8 (4.52)	1,264.6 (49.79)
Average precipitation days (≥ 1.0 mm)	7	7	6	7	6	7	5	6	6	8	6	7	78
Source 1: Instituto Uruguayo de Metereología
Source 2: NOAA (precipitation 1991–2020)

== Transportation ==
The Santa Bernardina International Airport is located just across the Río Negro river. While a commercial airport, as of 2021 it lacked passenger or cargo airline services.

== History ==
The town was founded on 12 October 1821, under the name of San Pedro del Durazno, as a homage to Brazilian Emperor Pedro I, at a time when the territory of present-day Uruguay had been annexed to Brazil as the Cisplatine Province. It had acquired the status of villa (town) before the independence of Uruguay. On 13 July 1906, its status was elevated to ciudad (city) by Act No. 3041. In May 2015, Diego Traibel was elected Mayor for the period 2015–2020.

== Population ==
According to the 2023 census, Durazno had a population of 40,279.

Year	Population
1908	10,507
1963	22,203
1975	25,981
1985	27,834
1996	30,607
2004	30,529
2011	34,368
2023	40,279

Source: Instituto Nacional de Estadística de Uruguay

== Culture ==
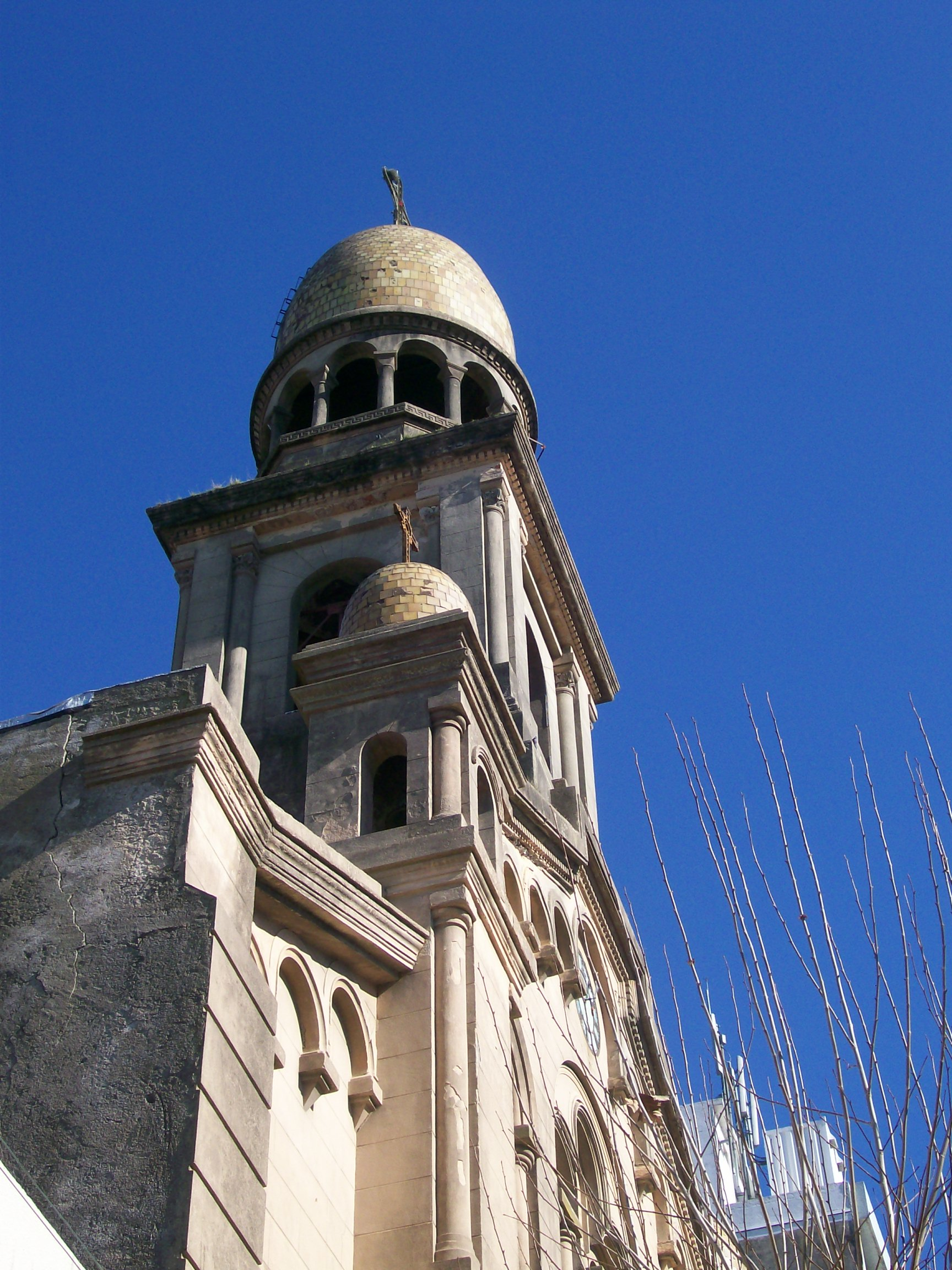
Church of San Pedro de Durazno

The church of San Pedro de Durazno is a landmark in the city. After a fire it was redesigned by engineer Eladio Dieste using reinforced brick.

== Notable people ==
- Antonio Alzamendi, footballer
- Bernabé Michelena, sculptor
- Margarita Martirena, sprinter
