= Paso de Carrasco =

Paso de Carrasco Paso Carrasco
- City & Municipality
- Location within Uruguay
- Coordinates: 34°52′17″S 56°1′38″W
- Country: Uruguay
- Department: Canelones

Population (2011 Census)
  - Total: 15,908
- Time zone: UTC -3
- Postal code: 15000
- Dial plan: +598 2 (+7 digits)

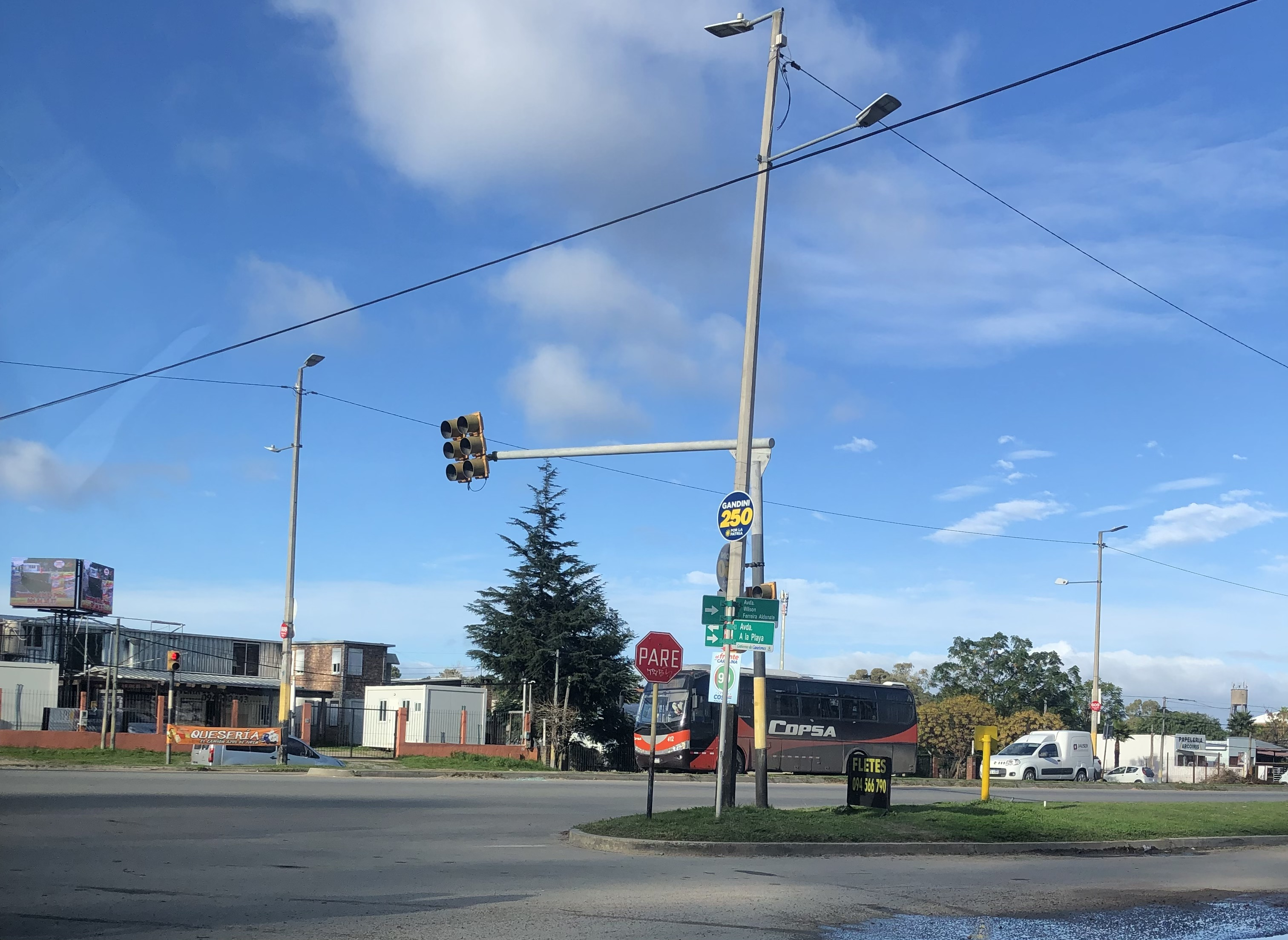

Paso de Carrasco or Paso Carrasco is a city in the Canelones Department of Uruguay.

Paso Carrasco is also the name of the municipality to which the city belongs and which includes also Barra de Carrasco and the area of the International Airport.

== Geography ==
=== Location ===
The city is located on Route 106 (Camino Carrasco), east of the stream Arroyo Carrasco. Across this stream it borders the Montevideo Department, to the southeast it borders the Ciudad de la Costa, while to the northeast is the Carrasco International Airport.

== History ==
On 15 October 1963 its status was elevated to "Pueblo" (village) by the Act of Ley Nº 13.167. On 19 October 1994, its status was further elevated to "Ciudad" (city) by the Act of Ley Nº 16.608.

== Population ==
According to the 2011 census, Paso Carrasco had a population of 15,908. In 2010, the Intendencia de Canelones had estimated a population of 19,775 for the municipality during the elections. The official site of the Intendencia de Canelones states now a population of 22,688 for the municipality.

Year	Population
1963	4,896
1975	8,592
1985	10,278
1996	12,174
2004	15,028
2011	15,908

Source: Instituto Nacional de Estadística de Uruguay

== Places of worship ==
- Parish Church of St. Joseph the Worker (Roman Catholic)
