= Solymar, Uruguay =

Solymar
- Resort of Ciudad de la Costa
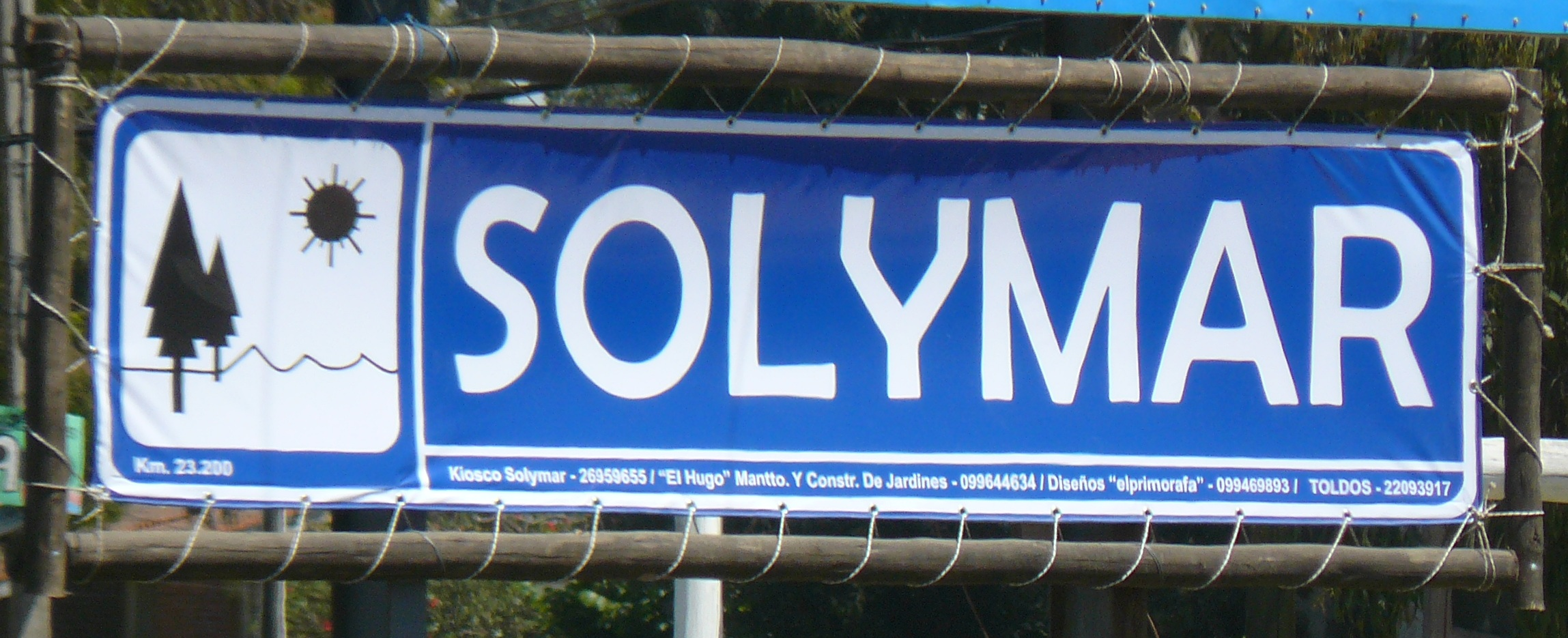

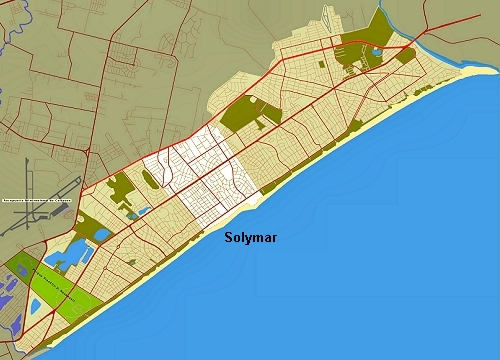
- Location of Solymar in Ciudad de la Costa
- Coordinates: 34°49′35″S 55°57′54″W
- Country: Uruguay
- Department: Canelones Department

Population (2011)
  - Total: 18,573
- Time zone: UTC -3
- Postal code: 15005
- Dial plan: +598 2 (+7 digits)

Solymar is a coastal resort or residential neighbourhood of the Ciudad de la Costa in the Canelones Department of Uruguay. Its name is a contraction of the words "Sun and Sea".

== Geography ==
=== Location ===
Solymar borders the coastline of the Río de la Plata to the south, El Bosque and Lagomar to the west, Lomas de Solymar to the east and its northern limit is formed by the highway Ruta Interbalnearia.

== History ==
In 1994, when Ciudad de la Costa took on the status of a city, Solymar was incorporated in it. It borders the resorts Lagomar to the west, El Bosque to the southwest and Lomas de Solymar to the northeast.

== Population ==
In 2011 Solymar had a population of 18,573.

| Year | Population |
|---|---|
| 1963 | 542 |
| 1975 | 3,527 |
| 1985 | 6,607 |
| 1996 | 13,942 |
| 2004 | 15,908 |
| 2011 | 18,573 |

Source: Instituto Nacional de Estadística de Uruguay

== Places of worship ==
- Parish Church of Our Lady of the Foundation (Roman Catholic)

== Street map ==
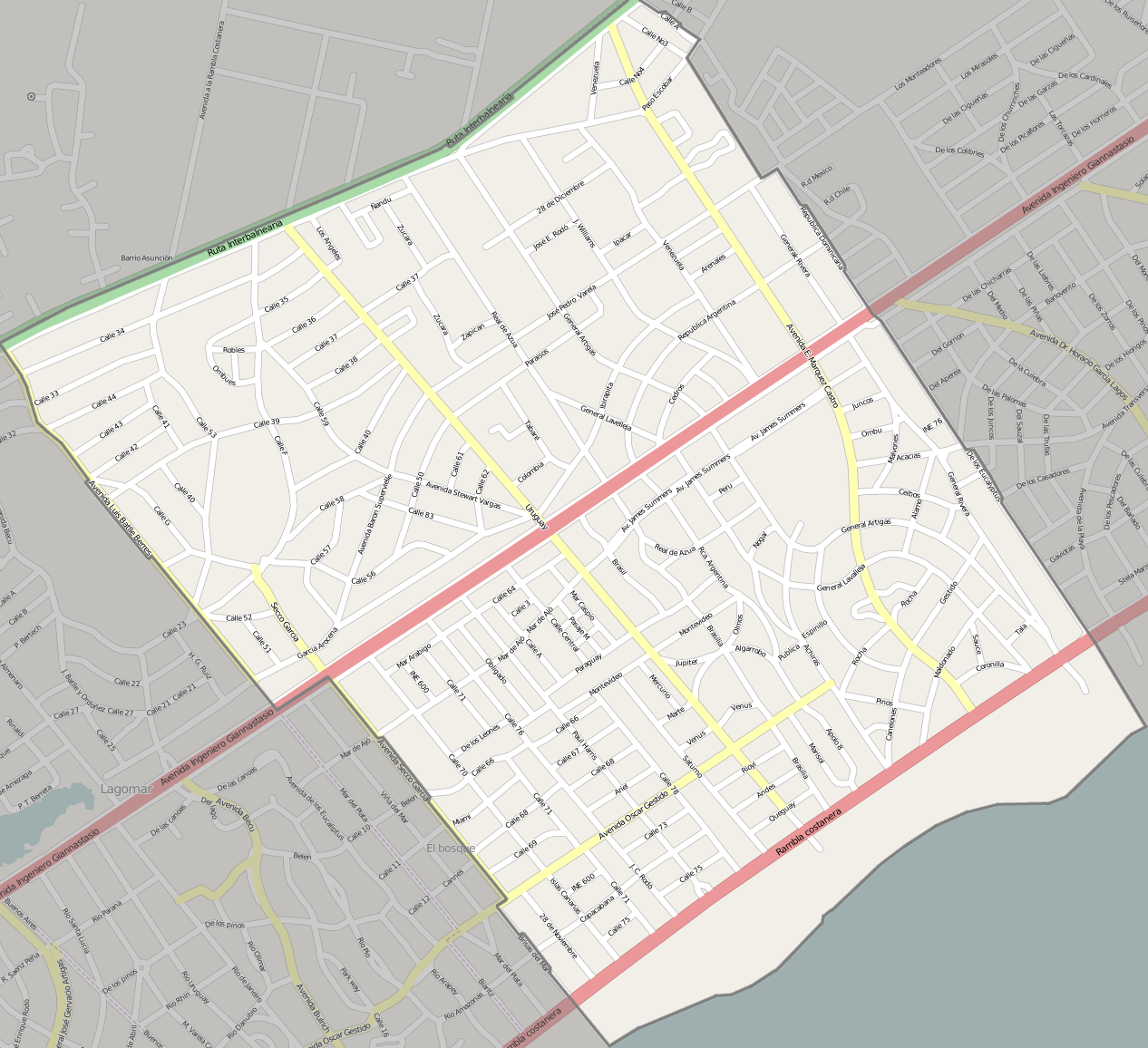
Street map of Solymar
