= Shangrilá =

- Resort of Ciudad de la Costa
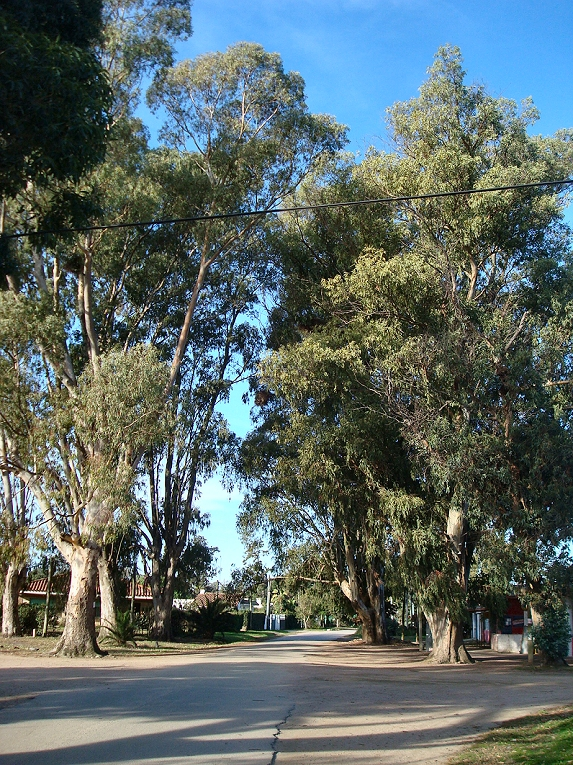
- Typical street in Shangrilá

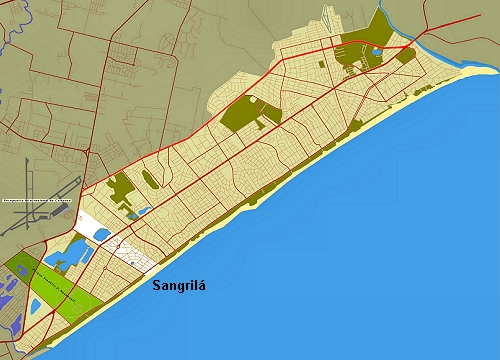
- Location of Shangrilá in Ciudad de la Costa

- Location in Uruguay
- Coordinates: 34°50′51″S 55°59′53″W
- Country: Uruguay
- Department: Canelones Department

Population (2011)
  - Total: 3,195
- Time zone: UTC -3
- Postal code: 15001
- Dial plan: +598 2 (+7 digits)

Shangrilá is a coastal resort or residential neighbourhood of the Ciudad de la Costa in the Canelones Department of Uruguay.

== Geography ==
=== Location ===
This neighborhood is located on the western area of Ciudad de la Costa, at 18 kilometres (11 mi) east of the centre of Montevideo on Avenida Giannattasio. It borders Parque Carrasco to the west, San José de Carrasco to the east, the Rio de la Plata to the south and Avenida Giannattasio to the north.

== Etymology ==
Its name derives from James Hilton's imaginary land Shangri-La because it was so peaceful that it seemed that time did not pass.

Shangrilá is acronym of: Sociedad Hipotecaria Administradora de Negocios Generales Rentas Inversiones Locaciones Anónima (S.H.A.N.G.R.I.L.A), name of the society with Argentinian capitals which was the proprietary of the terrain.

== History ==
Originally a seaside resort, now it is a residential neighbourhood and resort of Ciudad de la Costa. It was created in 1946 on 57 hectares, which were owned by the Sociedad Anónima Hipotecaria de Adquisiciones, Negocios, Inversiones y Locaciones. Between 1985 and 1996 its population increased 70%.

In 1965 happened a notorious event in Shangrilá: the Mossad assassinated Latvian Nazi collaborator Herberts Cukurs, who was hiding there.

== Population ==
In 2011 Shangrilá had a population of 3,195.

Year	Population
1963	372
1975	1,057
1985	1,758
1996	3,014
2004	2,902
2011	3,195

Source: Instituto Nacional de Estadística de Uruguay

== Transport ==
As an extension of the Rambla of Montevideo, Route 10, known here as the "Rambla Costanera", crosses the stream Arroyo Carrasco and runs along the seafront of Ciudad de la Costa. The sister lake of the Lago Calcagno divides the resort from Carrasco Airport the other side of the lake and Route 101. Shangrila is divided by the long Avenida Luis Giannattasio, along which are concentrated the main commercial and service activities of the place. This avenue divides most of the resort from the lake to the north.

== Places of worship ==
- Parish Church of the Most Holy Trinity (Roman Catholic)

== Street map ==
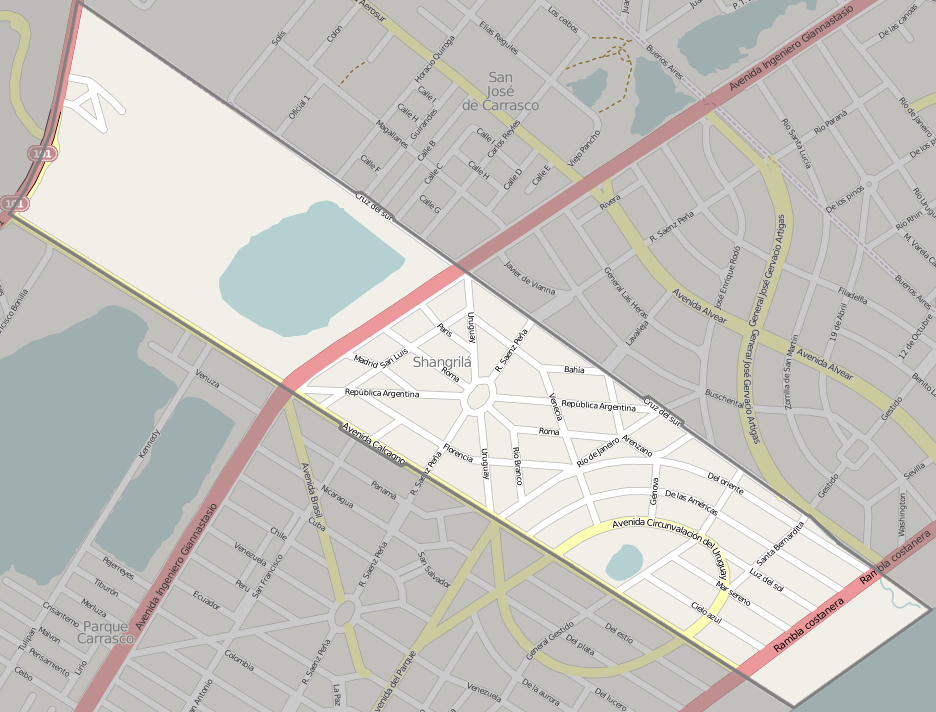
Street map of Shangrilá
