= Curtiss-Wright CW-22 =

1940s American military training aircraft

CW-22/SNC
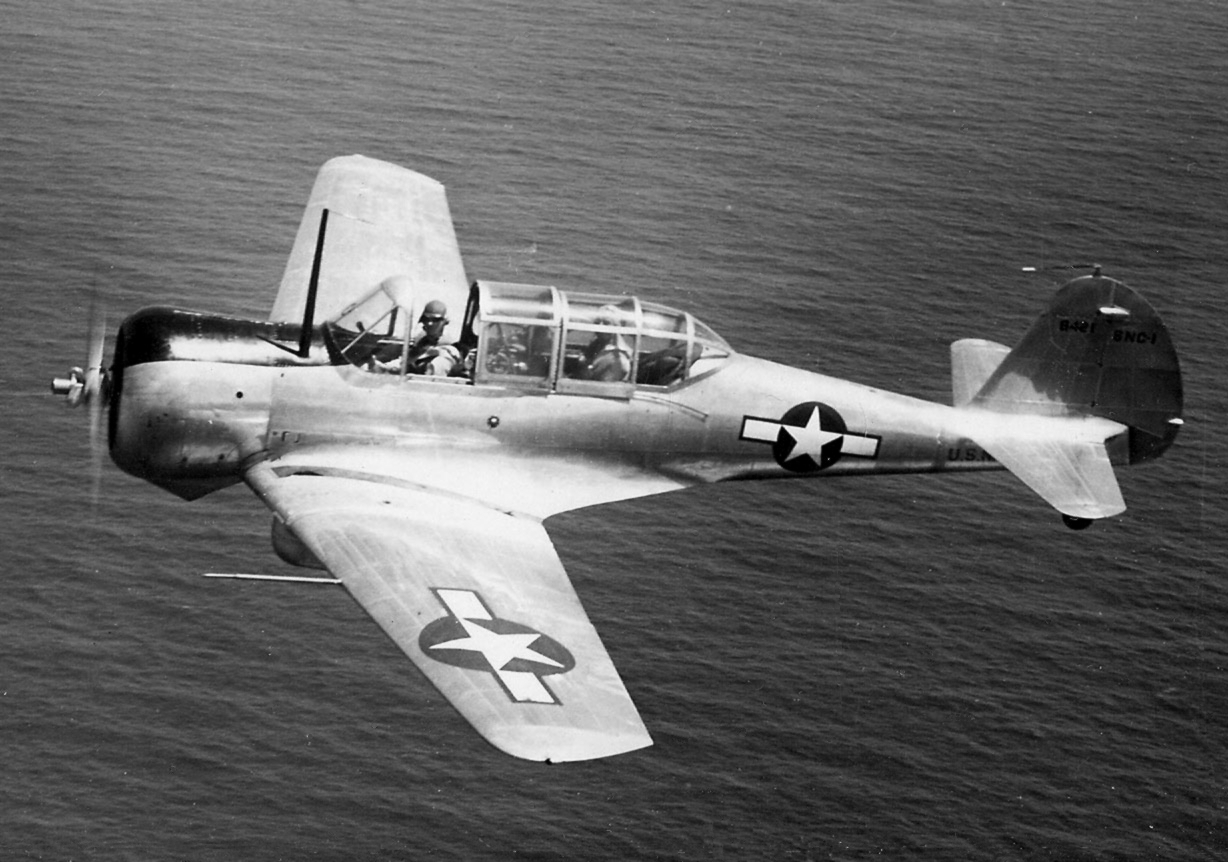
- A U.S. Navy SNC-1 in September 1943

General information
- Type: Scout and advanced trainer
- Manufacturer: Curtiss-Wright Corporation
- Primary users: United States Navy Royal Netherlands East Indies Army Air Force
- Number built: 442 approx.

History
- Introduction date: 1942
- First flight: 1940
- Developed from: Curtiss-Wright CW-19

The Curtiss-Wright CW-22 is a 1940s American general-purpose advanced training monoplane aircraft built by the Curtiss-Wright Corporation. It was operated by the United States Navy as a scout trainer with the designation SNC-1 Falcon.

== Design and development ==
Developed at the Curtiss-Wright St. Louis factory, the CW-22 was developed from the CW-19 via the single-seat CW-21 light fighter-interceptor. The prototype first flew in 1940. With less power and performance than the CW-21, the two-seat, low-wing, all-metal CW-A22 had retractable tailwheel landing gear, with the main gear retracting rearward into underwing fairings.

The CW-22 was seen as either a civilian sport or training monoplane or suitable as a combat trainer, reconnaissance and general-purpose aircraft for military use. The prototype CW-A22 Falcon (U.S. civilian registration NC18067) was used as a company demonstrator and is one of four of the type still in existence.

== Operational history ==
The main customer for the aircraft equipped with the Wright R-975 Whirlwind air-cooled radial engine was the Royal Netherlands East Indies Army Air Force and 36 were exported. The aircraft had to be delivered to the Dutch in Australia due to the advancing Japanese forces. A developed version, the CW-22B, was sold to Turkey (50), the Netherlands East Indies (25) and in small numbers in South America. Some of the Dutch aircraft were captured and operated by the Imperial Japanese Army Air Force. The CW-22 and CW-22B were armed with two machine guns, one fixed.

An unarmed advanced training version (CW-22N) was demonstrated to the United States Navy. To help to meet the expanding need for training, the Navy ordered 150 aircraft in November 1940. Further orders brought the total to 305 aircraft which were designated SNC-1 Falcon.

Curtiss converted a CW-19 into a CW-22 demonstrator. They hoped to use this to sell the CW-22 to China. The aircraft was obtained by the Burma Volunteer Air Force, and later used by the Royal Air Force in India. It was scrapped in 1946.

== Variants ==
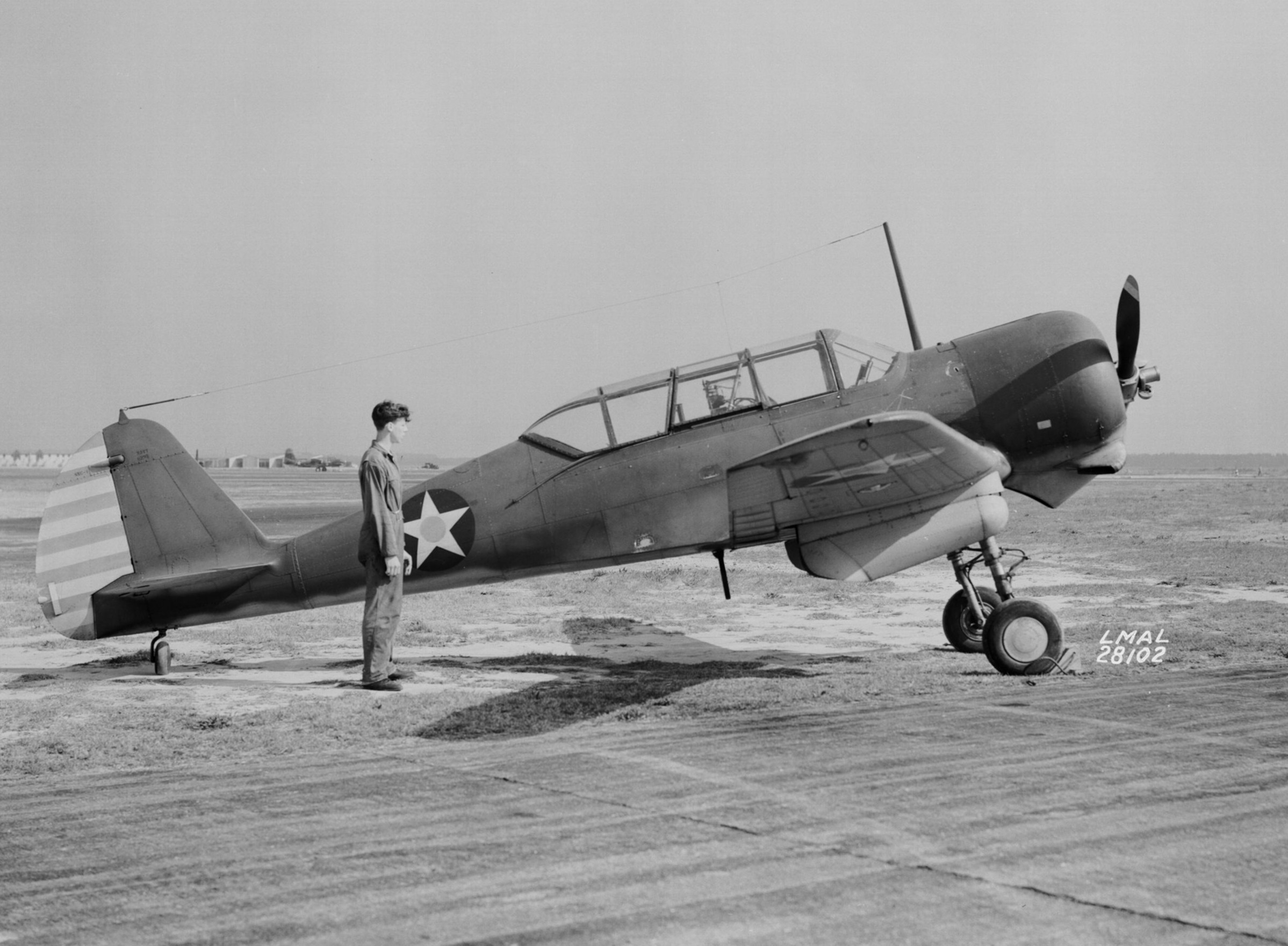
A U.S. Navy SNC-1 in April 1942

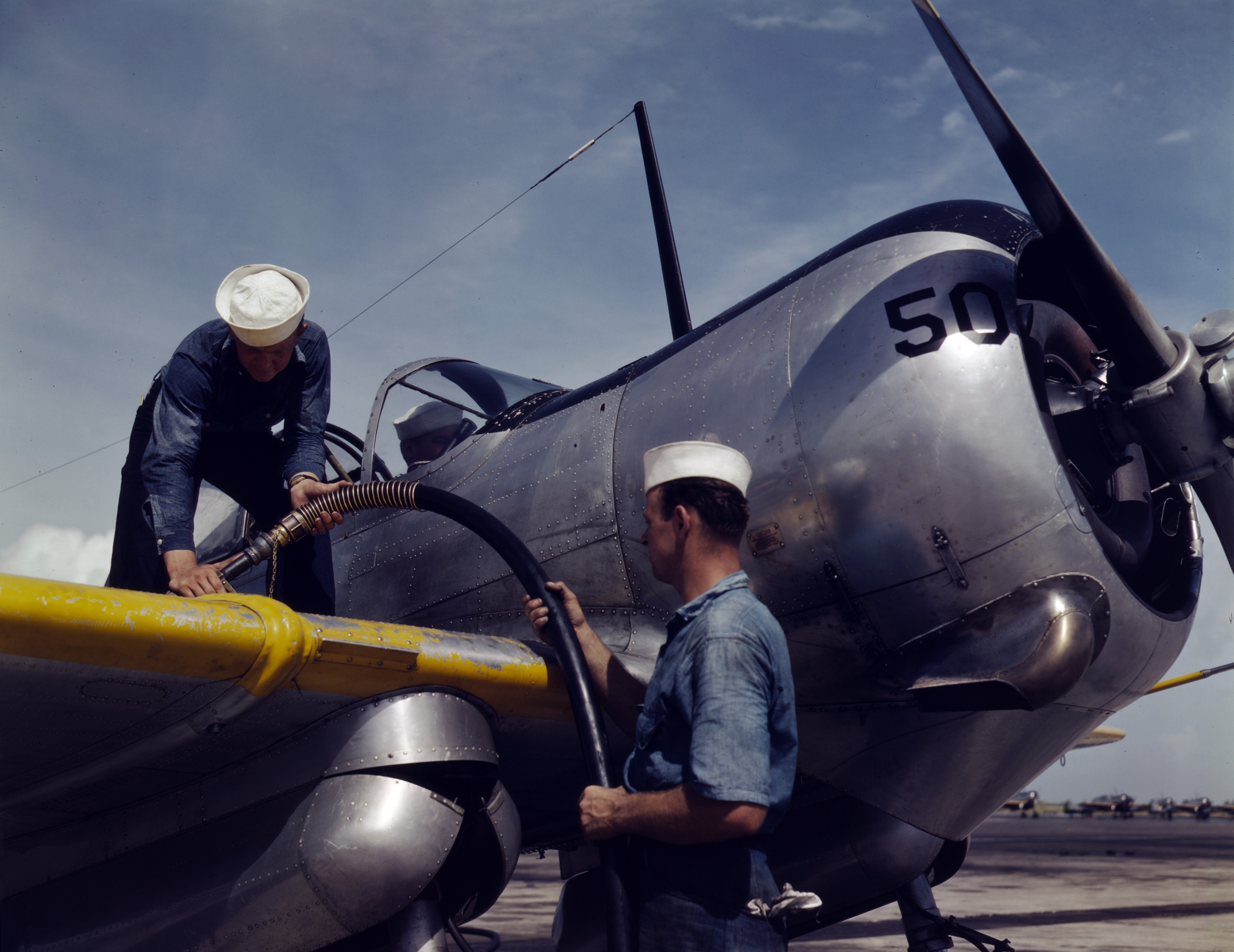
Refueling of an SNC-1 at NAS Corpus Christi, 1942

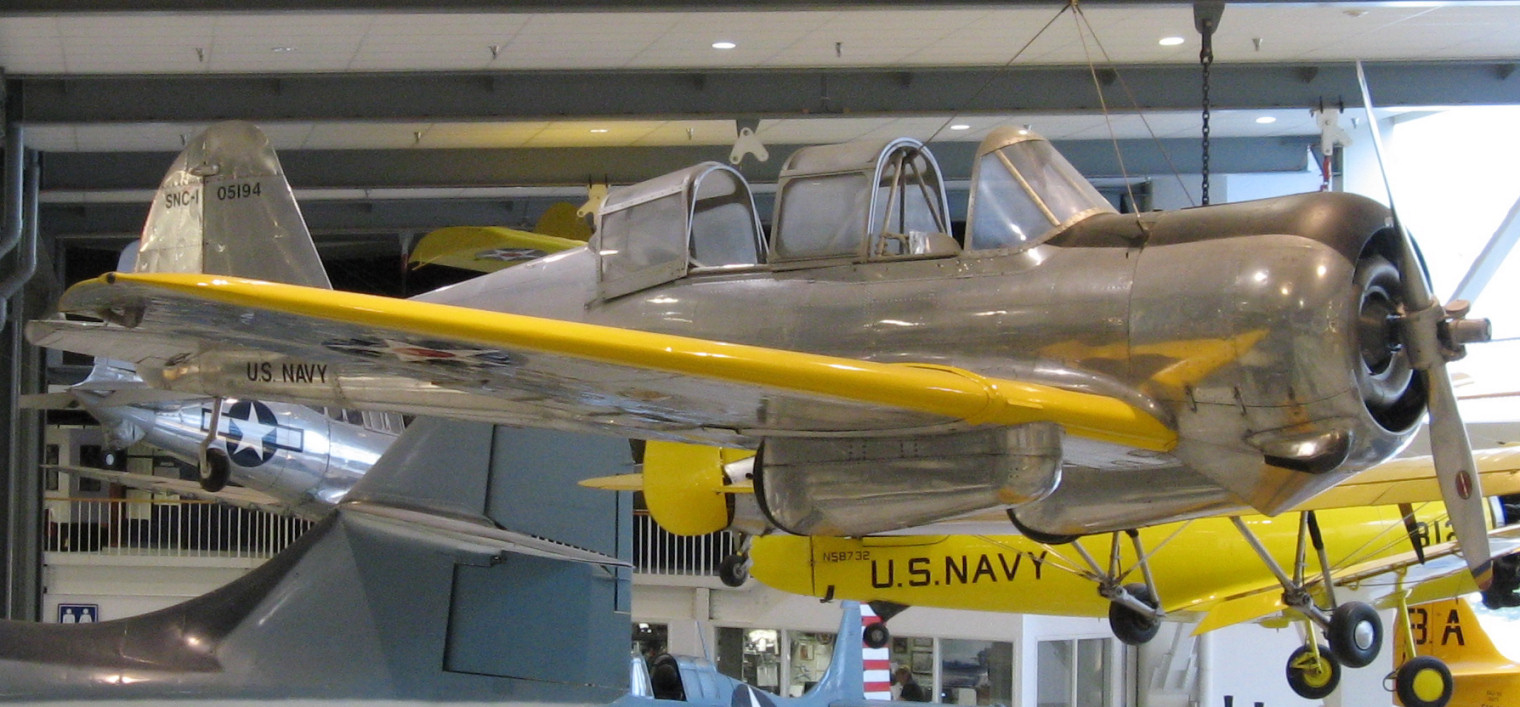
SNC-1 on display at the National Museum of Naval Aviation

CW-A22
Prototype
CW-22
Production armed variant for the Royal Netherlands East Indies Army Air Force, 36 built.
CW-22B
Improved armed variant, approx 100 built.
SNC-1 Falcon (CW-22N)
United States Navy designation for the CW-22N, 305 built (BuNo 6290-6439, 05085-05234, 32987-32991).

== Operators ==
Bolivia

- The Bolivian Air Force operated 10 aircraft.

British Burma

- Burma Volunteer Air Force

(Netherlands) Dutch East Indies

- Royal Netherlands East Indies Army Air Force

Japan

- The Imperial Japanese Army Air Force operated captured ex-Dutch aircraft.

Peru
Turkey

- Turkish Air Force

United Kingdom

- The Royal Air Force in India operated the former Burma Volunteer Air Force aircraft

United States

- United States Navy

Uruguay

- Uruguayan Air Force 9 SNC-1 aircraft operated from 1942 to 1951.

== Surviving aircraft ==
Turkey

- s/n 2615 – CW-22B on static display at the Istanbul Aviation Museum in Istanbul.

United States

- c/n A22-1 – CW-22 owned by the Collings Foundation in Stow, Massachusetts.
- c/n 3707 – CW-22 in storage at the Fantasy of Flight in Polk City, Florida.
- BuNo 05194 – SNC-1 on static display at the National Naval Aviation Museum in Pensacola, Florida.

Uruguay

- SNC-1 on display at the Colonel Jaime Meregalli Aeronautical Museum in Ciudad de la Costa, Canelones.

== Specifications (SNC-1) ==
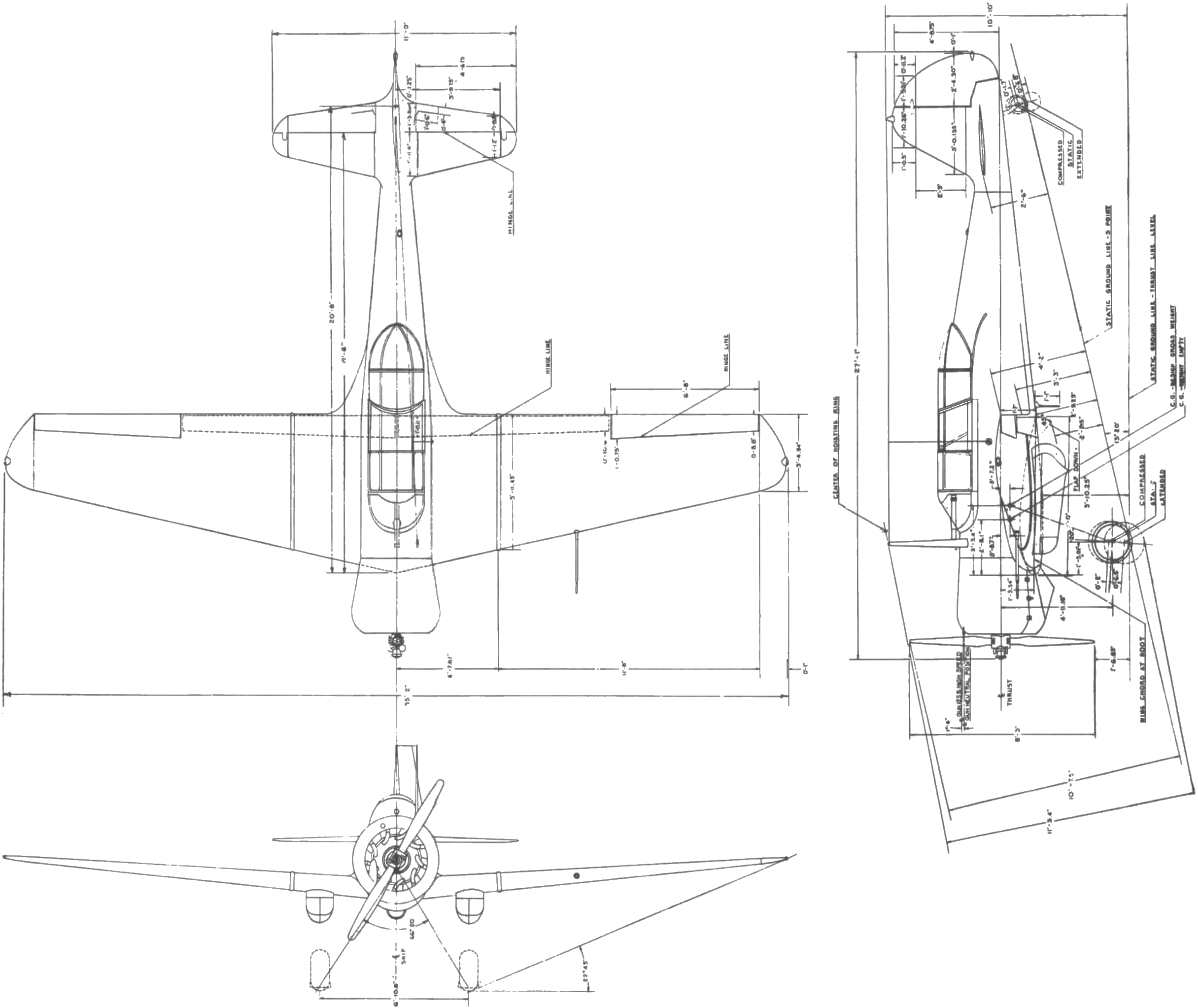
3-view line drawing of the Curtiss SNC-1 Falcon

Data from Curtiss Aircraft 1907–1947, The encyclopedia of world aircraft

General characteristics

- Crew: 2
- Length: 27 ft 0 in (8.23 m)
- Wingspan: 35 ft 0 in (10.67 m)
- Height: 9 ft 11 in (3.02 m)
- Wing area: 173.7 sq ft (16.14 m^{2})
- Airfoil: Curtiss CW-19 Special
- Empty weight: 2,736 lb (1,241 kg)
- Gross weight: 3,788 lb (1,718 kg)
- Powerplant: 1 × Wright R-975-28 Whirlwind 9-cylinder air-cooled radial piston engine, 450 hp (340 kW) for take-off; 420 hp (310 kW) max continuous
- Propellers: 2-bladed variable-pitch metal propeller

Performance

- Maximum speed: 198 mph (319 km/h, 172 kn) at sea level
- Range: 780 mi (1,260 km, 680 nmi)
- Service ceiling: 21,800 ft (6,600 m)
- Rate of climb: 1,650 ft/min (8.4 m/s)

Armament

- Guns: 1x fixed forward-firing synchronised 0.30 in (7.62 mm) machine-gun and 1x flexibly mounted 0.30 in (7.62 mm) machine-gun in the rear cockpit

== See also ==
Related lists

- List of United States Navy aircraft designations (pre-1962)

== Bibliography ==
- Andrade, John. U.S. Military Aircraft Designations and Serials since 1909. Hinckley, UK: Midland Counties Publications, 1979. ISBN 0-904597-22-9.
- Bowers, Peter M. Curtiss Aircraft 1907–1947. London: Putnam, 1979. ISBN 0-370-10029-8.
- Bowers, Peter M. United States Navy Aircraft since 1911. Annapolis, Maryland: Naval Institute Press, 1990. ISBN 0-87021-792-5.
- Donald, David, ed. The Encyclopedia of World Aircraft. Etobicoke, Ontario: Prospero Books, 1997 ISBN 1-85605-375-X.
- The Illustrated Encyclopedia of Aircraft (Part Work 1982–1985). London: Orbis Publishing, 1985.
- Ledet, Michel (April 2002). "Des avions alliés aux couleurs japonais" [Allied Aircraft in Japanese Colors]. Avions: Toute l'Aéronautique et son histoire (in French) (109): 17–21. ISSN 1243-8650.
- Ledet, Michel (May 2002). "Des avions alliés aux couleurs japonais". Avions: Toute l'Aéronautique et son histoire (in French) (110): 16–23. ISSN 1243-8650.
