= Colonel Jaime Meregalli Aeronautical Museum =

Aviation museum in Canelones, Uruguay

- Museo Aeronáutico Cnel. (Av.) Jaime Meregalli
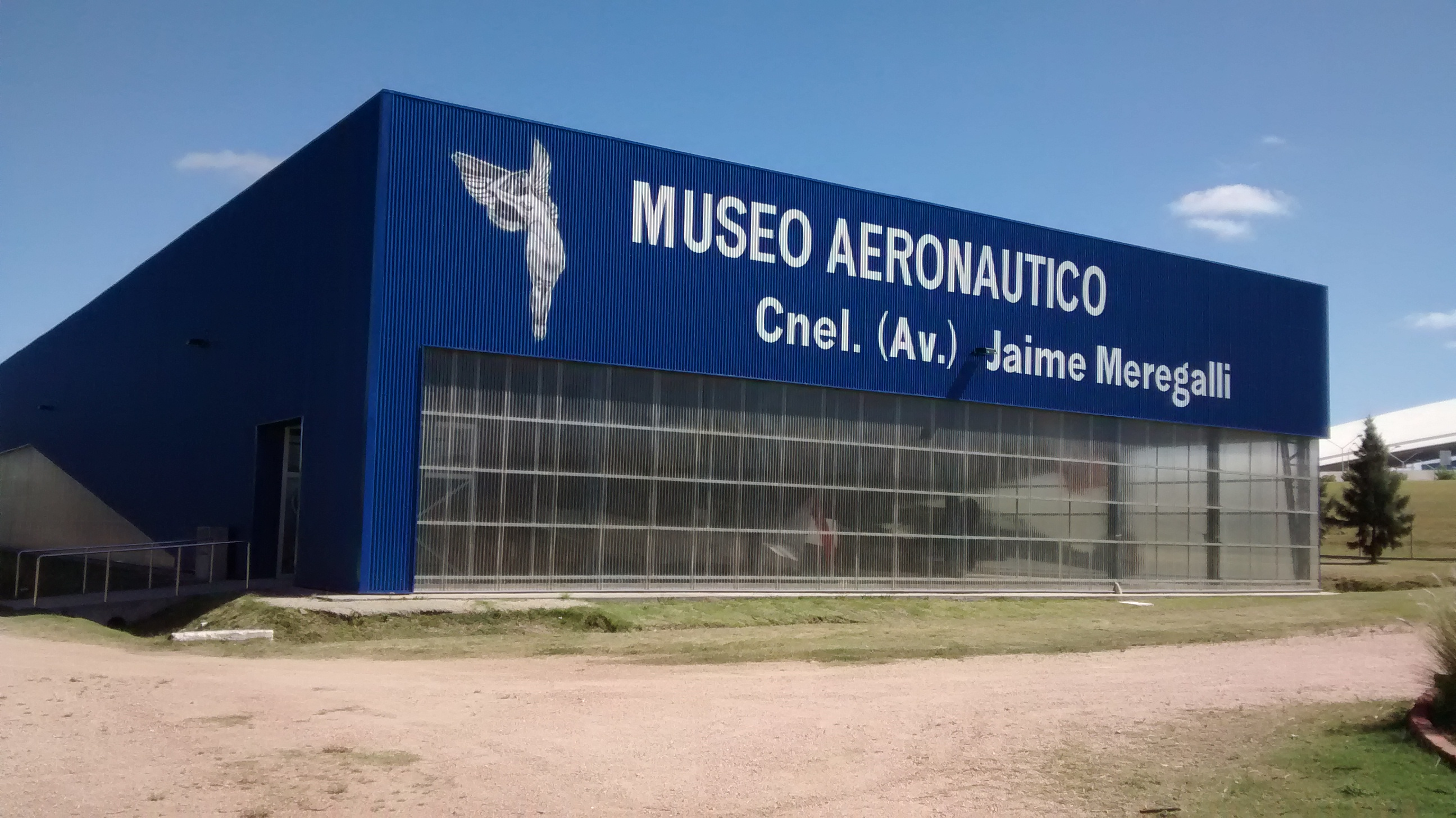

- Location within Uruguay
- Former name: National Aviation Museum; Aeronautical Museum
- Established: 8 August 1954
- Location: Ciudad de la Costa, Canelones
- Coordinates: 34.839681°S 56.016266°W
- Type: Aviation museum
- Founder: Colonel (Av.) Jaime Meregalli
- Website: fau.mil.uy/es/articulos/20-museo-aeronautico.html

The Colonel Jaime Meregalli Aeronautical Museum in an aviation museum located in Ciudad de la Costa, Canelones.

== History ==
Originating from an exhibition at Capitan Boiso Lanza Air Base, the museum was founded on 8 August 1954 by Colonel (Av.) Jaime Meregalli. The museum was moved a number of times in its early years, first to Air Base No. 1 in Carrasco and shortly thereafter to the Cilindro Municipal in downtown Montevideo. It became the Colonel Jaime Meregalli Aeronautical Museum on 17 March 1993. On 4 December 1997, the museum suffered a fire which damaged a number of aircraft in the collection. Eventually, in 2013, it was moved to Carrasco International Airport.

== Collection ==
- Beechcraft AT-11 Kansan
- Beechcraft T-34B Mentor
- Bell UH-1B Iroquois
- Bell UH-1H Iroquois
- Bleriot XI
- Castaibert VI
- Cessna A-37B Dragonfly
- Curtiss-Wright SNC-1 Falcon
- de Havilland DH.60 Gipsy Moth
- de Havilland Canada DHC-1 Chipmunk
- DFS SG 38 Schulgleiter
- Douglas C-47A Skytrain
- Douglas DC-3
- Fairchild PT-19
- Farman
- FMA IA 58 Pucará
- Focke-Wulf Fw 44 J
- Hiller OH-23F Raven
- Lockheed 18 Lodestar
- Lockheed F-80C Shooting Star
- Lockheed T-33A
- Neybar N.1
- North American AT-6G Texan
- North American B-25 Mitchell
- Piper AE-1
- Potez 25 A.2
- Ryan Navion
- Santos-Dumont 14-bis – Replica
- Stinson 108-3
