= Alfredo Arias =

Uruguayan footballer and manager (born 1958)

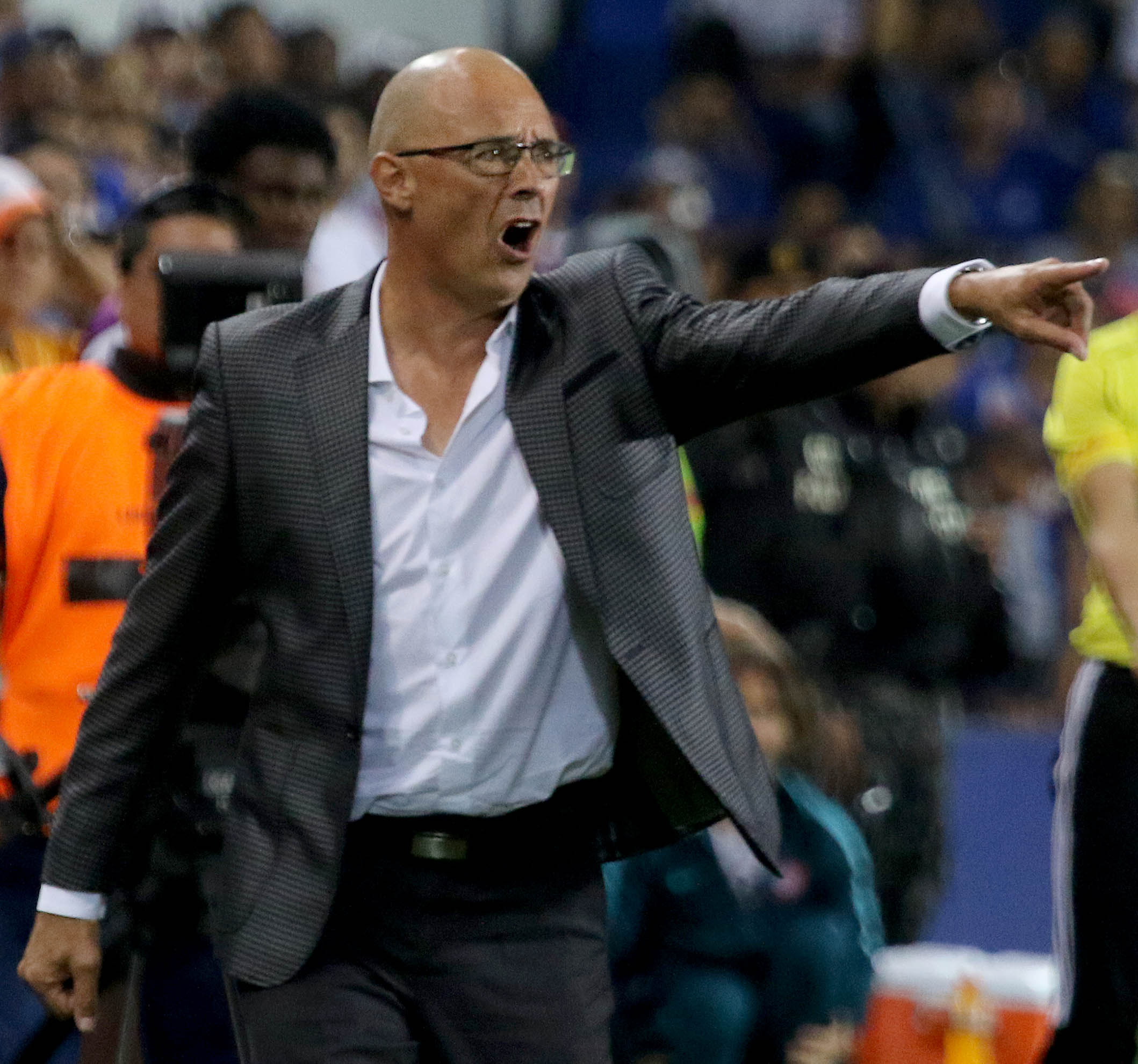
- Arias as coach of Emelec in 2017.

Personal information
- Full name: Alfredo Carlos Arias Sánchez
- Date of birth: 28 November 1958 (age 67)
- Place of birth: Shangrilá, Uruguay
- Position: Forward

Senior career*
Years	Team	Apps	(Gls)
1976	Nacional		
1977-1978	Montevideo Wanderers	21	(4)
1978	Liverpool Montevideo		
1979	Jaén	9	(0)
1980–1981	Peñarol	34	(10)
1981–1982	Palestino		
1983	Montevideo Wanderers	24	(8)
1984	O'Higgins		
1985	Huachipato		
1986	Trasandino		
1987	Tampico Madero		

Managerial career
- 2006: Montevideo Cricket
- 2007–2011: Montevideo Wanderers (youth)
- 2012–2015: Montevideo Wanderers
- 2015: Santiago Wanderers
- 2016–2018: Emelec
- 2018: Bolívar
- 2019: Universidad de Chile
- 2019: Montevideo Wanderers
- 2020–2021: Deportivo Cali
- 2022: Santa Fe
- 2023: Peñarol
- 2023–2024: Independiente Medellín
- 2025: Deportivo Cali
- 2025–2026: Junior
- * Club domestic league appearances and goals

Alfredo Carlos Arias Sánchez (born 28 November 1958 in Shangrilá) is a Uruguayan football manager and former player who played as a forward. He was most recently the manager of Colombian club Junior.

== Managerial statistics ==
As of match played 29 August 2026

Managerial record by team and tenure
Team	Nat	From	To	Record							
Team	Nat	From	To	G	W	D	L	GF	GA	GD	Win %
Montevideo Wanderers	(Uruguay)	1 January 2012	13 June 2015	118	49	26	43	182	156	+26	41.53
Santiago Wanderers	(Chile)	1 January 2016	31 May 2016	20	7	8	5	33	28	+5	35.00
Emelec	(Ecuador)	1 June 2016	20 May 2018	107	57	22	28	173	109	+64	53.27
Bolívar	(Bolivia)	18 June 2016	31 December 2018	28	15	2	11	73	51	+22	53.57
Universidad de Chile	(Chile)	14 March 2019	4 August 2019	16	4	8	4	22	24	−2	25.00
Montevideo Wanderers	(Uruguay)	2 September 2019	31 December 2019	15	5	4	6	19	18	+1	33.33
Deportivo Cali	(Colombia)	1 January 2020	6 September 2021	62	23	25	14	79	74	+5	37.10
Santa Fe	(Colombia)	19 May 2022	30 November 2022	26	12	7	7	33	35	−2	46.15
Peñarol	(Uruguay)	1 January 2023	18 June 2023	23	11	4	8	35	33	+2	47.83
Independiente Medellín	(Colombia)	4 July 2023	4 August 2024	65	31	19	15	94	75	+19	47.69
Deportivo Cali	(Colombia)	1 January 2025	29 May 2025	20	5	9	6	14	17	−3	25.00
Junior	(Colombia)	23 June 2025	31 August 2026	74	31	20	23	108	95	+13	41.89
Total				574	250	154	170	865	715	+150	43.55
