= Lomas de La Tahona =

- Residential area
- Location in Uruguay
- Coordinates: 34°47′10″S 55°58′20″W
- Country: Uruguay
- Department: Canelones Department

Population (2011)
  - Total: 806
- Time zone: UTC -3
- Postal code: 14000
- Dial plan: +598 2 (+7 digits)

Lomas de La Tahona is a residential area in the Canelones Department of southern Uruguay.

== Geography ==
=== Location ===
It is located east of Route 101 and northwest of Colinas de Solymar, about 6 kilometres (3.7 mi) northeast of the Carrasco International Airport. It is joined with La Tahona and Carmel to its west and south and Villa El Tato to the northwest. It is part of the wider metropolitan area of Montevideo.

== Population ==
In 2011 Lomas de La Tahona had a population of 806.

Year	Population
2004	332
2011	806

Source: INE - 2004 census
