= El Bosque, Uruguay =

El Bosque
- Resort of Ciudad de la Costa
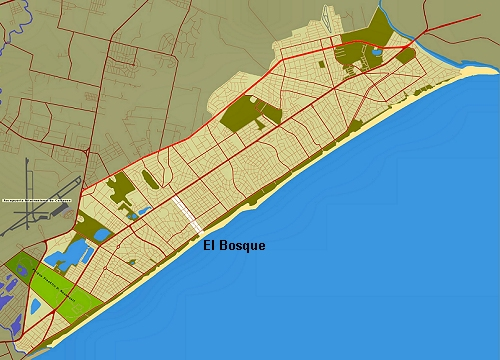
- Location of El Bosque in Ciudad de la Costa
- Coordinates: 34°50′16″S 55°58′23″W
- Country: Uruguay
- Department: Canelones Department

Population (2011)
  - Total: 988
- Time zone: UTC -3
- Postal code: 15004
- Dial plan: +598 2 (+7 digits)

El Bosque is a small neighbourhood of Ciudad de la Costa in the Canelones Department of southern Uruguay.

== Geography ==
=== Location ===
This neighbourhood is located just southeast of Lagomar and west of Solymar. In 2004 it had a population of 941. Its area is merely 0.33 square kilometres (0.13 sq mi).

== History ==
Civilization on the land was launched in 1953 on five acres owned by brothers Oscar and Rupert Crapuchette under the initiative of Mariano Almenera. The name means "The Forest" in Spanish. The area extended between 1985 and 1996 when its population grew by over 70%.

== Demographics ==
In 2011 El Bosque had a population of 988.

Year	People
1963	87
1975	302
1985	519
1996	888
2004	941
2011	988

Source: Instituto Nacional de Estadística de Uruguay

== Transport ==
Route 10 passes along the seafront leading from Carrasco, known as the Rambla de Montevideo. The main roads are Avenida Luis Giannattasio which stretches along the length of the Ciudad de la Costa, along which are concentrated the main commercial and service activities of the place, Avenida Secco Garcgua, Avenida Oscar Gestido and Calle 76.

== Street map ==
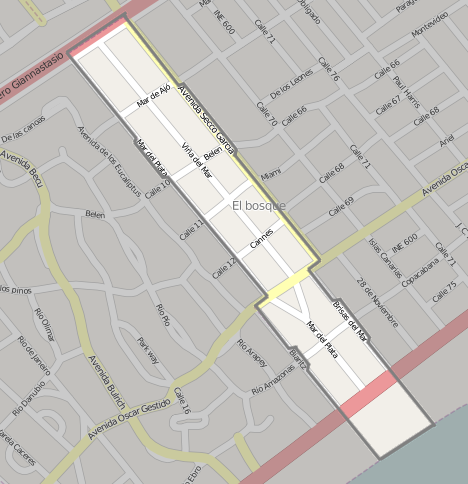
Street map of El Bosque
