= Herberts Cukurs =

Latvian aviator, Nazi collaborator and Holocaust perpetrator (1900–1965)

- Cukurs in 1934
- Born: Herberts Albert Cukurs; 17 May 1900; Liepāja, Courland Governorate, Russian Empire
- Died: 23 February 1965 (aged 64); Shangrilá, Canelones Department, Uruguay
- Cause of death: Assassination by gunshot
- Other names: "The Butcher of Latvia"; "The Hangman of Riga"
- Occupation: Aviator
- Known for: Involvement in the Holocaust in Latvia
- Spouse: Milda Bērzupe
- Children: 4

Details
- Span of crimes: 1941–1944
- Country: German-occupied Latvia
- Target: Latvian Jews

Herberts Albert Cukurs (17 May 1900 – 23 February 1965) was a Latvian aviator, Holocaust perpetrator and Nazi collaborator. He served as the deputy commander of the Arajs Kommando, a collaborationist unit that carried out the largest mass murders of Latvian Jews during the Holocaust. Although Cukurs never stood trial, the accounts of multiple Holocaust survivors, including Zelma Shepshelovitz, credibly link him to personally supervising and committing war crimes and crimes against humanity for the duration of the German occupation of Latvia. His alleged crimes included shooting Jewish children and babies in captivity, burning Jews alive, and sexually assaulting Jewish women.

Two decades after World War II, Cukurs was identified in Brazil by a Holocaust survivor, who attempted to alert the authorities after seeing Cukurs' face on the cover of a magazine. Following the discovery, Cukurs was investigated and, in 1965, assassinated in Shangrilá, Uruguay by Nazi hunters who were working for Mossad, the national intelligence agency of Israel. In the aftermath of the assassination, Israeli journalist Gad Shimron and one of the Mossad agents ("Künzle") who killed Cukurs authored a book on the experience, titled The Execution of the Hangman of Riga. In it, they referred to Cukurs as the Butcher of Latvia, a name later used by several other sources.

One of the main goals of Cukurs's assassination was to pressure West Germany into extending the statute of limitations on Nazi war crimes. In 1964, the West German government announced that it would allow the statute of limitations to expire in 1965. Following Cukurs's assassination, however, the deadline was extended to 1969 and then to 1979, before the statute of limitations on murder was finally abolished entirely.

== Biography ==
=== Aviation career (1930s–1941) ===
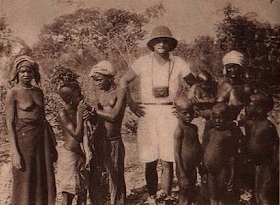
Cukurs in Gambia in 1933

As a pioneering long-distance pilot, Cukurs won national acclaim for his international solo flights in the 1930s (Latvia-Gambia and Riga-Tokyo). He was awarded the Harmon Trophy for Latvia in 1933, and was considered a national hero, in analogous fashion to Charles Lindbergh.

Cukurs built at least three aircraft of his own design. In 1937, he made a 45,000-kilometre (24,000 nmi; 28,000 mi) tour visiting Japan, China, Indochina and India, flying the C 6 wooden monoplane "Trīs zvaigznes" (registration YL-ABA) of his own creation. The aircraft was powered by a De Havilland Gipsy engine.

Cukurs also designed the Cukurs C-6bis prototype dive bomber in 1940. After the Soviet occupation of Latvia in 1940, Cukurs was summoned to Moscow in an attempt to recruit him to build planes for the Soviet Union.

=== Participation in the Holocaust (1941–1944) ===
In mid-1941, during the German occupation of Latvia, Cukurs became deputy commander of the newly formed Latvian Auxiliary Police unit, the Arajs Kommando.

In his book The Holocaust in Latvia, 1941-1945, the Latvian historian Andrew Ezergailis writes that Cukurs played a leading role in the atrocities that were committed in the Riga Ghetto in conjunction with the Rumbula massacre on 30 November 1941. After the war, surviving witnesses reported that Cukurs had been present during the ghetto clearance and fired into the mass of Jewish civilians.

According to other eyewitness sources, Cukurs was also the most recognizable Latvian SD man at the scene of the Rumbula massacre. Ezergailis states that "although Arājs' men were not the only ones on the ghetto end of the operation, to the degree they participated in the atrocities there, the chief responsibility rests on Herberts Cukurs' shoulders." Cukurs was described as follows:

The Latvian murderer Cukurs got out of a car wearing a pistol (Nagant) in a leather holster at his side. He went to the Latvian guards to give them various instructions. He had certainly been informed in detail about the great catastrophe that awaited us.

Later, Ezergailis retracted these interpretations, saying that in light of new documents, it would be wrong to claim that Cukurs had participated in the Rumbula shooting or the burning of the Riga synagogues. During interviews with the press, Ezergailis stated that there was no evidence that Cukurs had been at the pits at Rumbula, and that it had not been proven that Cukurs was "the most eager shooter of Jews in Latvia".

However, according to eyewitness accounts, Cukurs had participated in the burning of the Riga synagogues and the killing of Jews that he had dragged out of their houses, locked inside the synagogue on Stabu Street, set it on fire and shot with his revolver anyone who broke the windows from inside and tried to get out of the burning building.

Time reported at the time of Cukurs' death in 1965 that his crimes included setting the Riga synagogue fire, executing over 1,200 Jewish civilians (including infants) forced to stand over a lake (so victims fell into the water) in just one of many massacres he carried out, kidnapping and raping Jewish girls and young women at the Arajs Kommando Headquarters, and his participation in the Rumbula massacre in a forest near Riga. Multiple eyewitnesses said they saw Cukurs snatching infants from the arms of their mothers and shooting them.

=== Fall of Nazi Germany and Cukurs' flight to Brazil (1944–1945) ===
Cukurs retreated to Germany with German forces and fled to Brazil via the ratlines. The Brazilian Consulate in Marseille issued the visa for permanent residency on 18 December 1945. The visa did not list the name of the Latvian Jewish woman Cukurs kidnapped, raped, and pretended was his wife, but it identified three minor children: Gunārs, Antinea and Herberts.

In Brazil, Cukurs established a business in São Paulo, flying Republic RC-3 Seabees on scenic flights. While living in South America, he neither hid nor tried to conceal his identity.

=== Assassination in Uruguay by Israeli agents (1965) ===
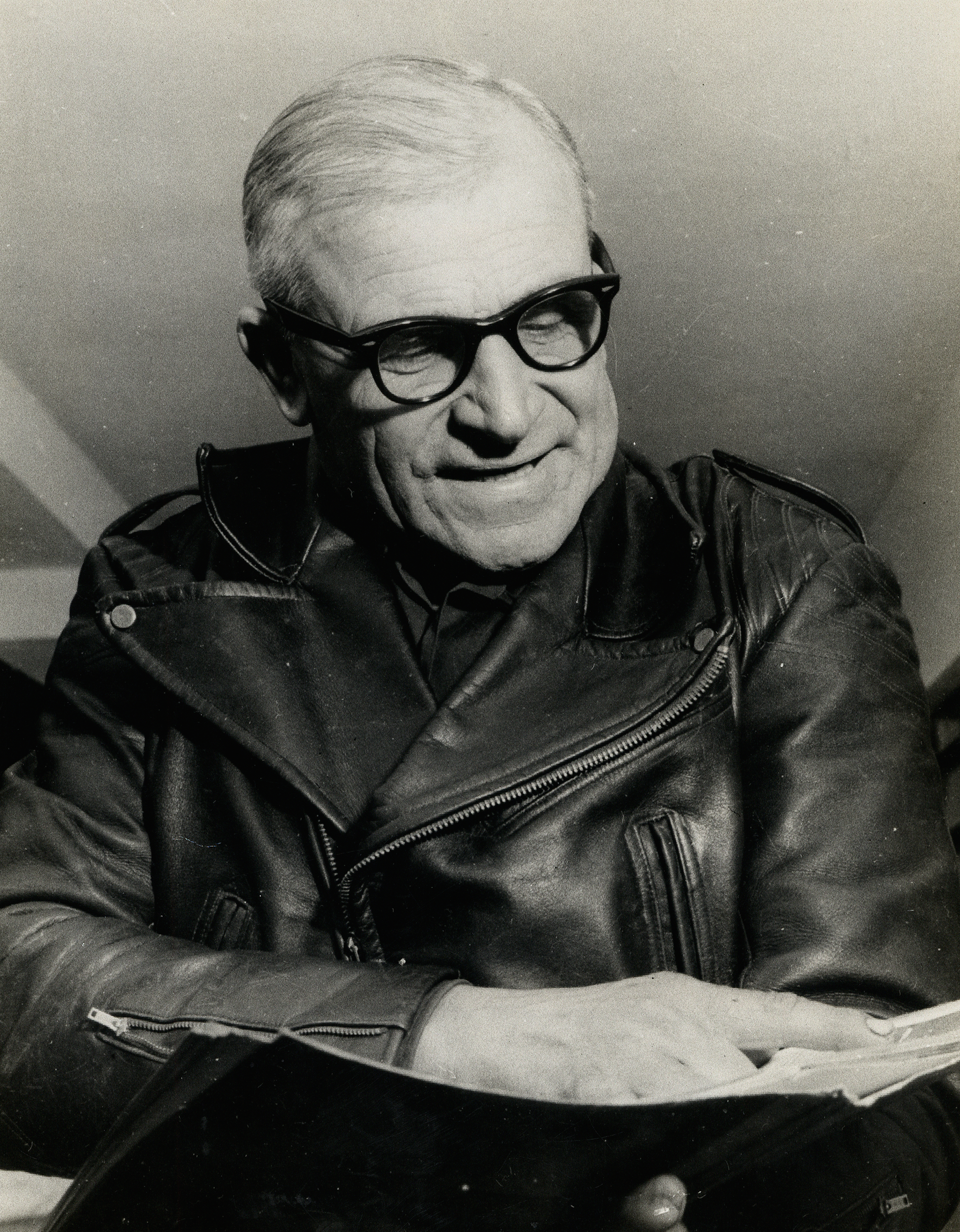
Cukurs in 1965

After it was learned that he would not stand trial for his participation in the Holocaust, Cukurs was assassinated by Nazi-hunting Mossad agents, who persuaded him to travel to Uruguay under the pretense of starting an aviation business. An acquaintance named "Anton Künzle", in reality the disguised Mossad agent Yaakov Meidad who had taken part in the capture of Adolf Eichmann in Argentina in 1960, cabled Cukurs from Montevideo. He was invited to a house in a remote suburb of the city that had just been rented by a man from Vienna. Inside, he was ambushed by a group of men.

Cukurs fought back against his attackers, and bit the finger of one of the hitmen so hard it was nearly severed. Ultimately, Cukurs was overwhelmed. He was subdued after one of the men hit him in the head with a hammer. Now helpless, Cukurs started pleading with the men to let him speak (yelling "Lass mich sprechen!") before they did anything else. He received no response and was promptly shot in the head twice with a suppressed automatic pistol, killing him instantly. His body, found in a trunk on 6 March, had several gunshot wounds elsewhere, and his skull was shattered. Next to his body, several documents were left pertaining to his involvement in the murder of Jews in the Riga Ghetto.

Media outlets in South America and Germany received a note stating:

Taking into consideration the gravity of the charge leveled against the accused, namely that he personally supervised the killing of more than 30,000 men, women and children, and considering the extreme display of cruelty which the subject showed when carrying out his tasks, the accused Herberts Cukurs is hereby sentenced to death. Accused was executed by those who can never forget, on the 23rd of February, 1965. His body can be found at Casa Cubertini Calle Colombia, Séptima Sección del Departamento de Canelones, Montevideo, Uruguay.

The note was initially dismissed as a prank, but then police were notified and the body was discovered.

== Legacy ==
=== Attempted exoneration by right-wing Latvian nationalists ===
The American-born Israeli historian and Nazi hunter Efraim Zuroff has pointed out that Cukurs was not prosecuted has allowed for, what he believes, are "attempts by right-wing nationalists and his family to totally exonerate Cukurs and by other Latvians to question or diminish his individual culpability" and "to restore him to hero status in Latvia and whitewash his massive guilt".

In 2004, postal envelopes with the image of Cukurs were issued and distributed by National Power Unity, a far-right nationalist political party in Latvia. The act was condemned by Yad Vashem, as well as Minister of Foreign Affairs of Latvia Artis Pabriks who said that "those who produced such envelopes in Latvia evidently do not understand the tragic history of World War II in Latvia or in Europe". The Ministry of Foreign Affairs stated that Cukurs was "guilty of war crimes", and that he "took part in the activities of the notorious Arajs Kommando, which participated in the Holocaust and was responsible for the killing of innocent civilians. The General Prosecutor's Office of Latvia has twice rejected the exoneration of Herberts Cukurs".

In summer of 2005, a controversial exhibition "Herberts Cukurs: The Presumption of Innocence" was organized by the culture and art NGO K@2 in Liepāja. In a letter, members of the Latvian Jewish community called the exhibit "an attempt to rehabilitate a war criminal," and criticized Latvian ultra-nationalist politician Aleksandrs Kiršteins for his tacit support of it. For his response, in which Kiršteins hinted at the Latvian Jewish community's collaboration with the "state's enemies" during the Soviet occupation of Latvia in 1940, he was expelled from People's Party. Marģers Vestermanis, director of the Jews in Latvia museum, summarized the overall message of the exhibit as "Jews killed our hero."

In April 2025, the Latvian prosecutor closed the case regarding Cukurs, citing insufficient evidence.

=== Documentaries ===
Episode 1 of National Geographic's 2009 series Nazi Hunters recreated Mossad's assassination operation of Cukurs.

On 11 October 2014, the musical Cukurs. Herberts Cukurs, produced by Juris Millers, premiered in Liepāja. "We are not Herbert Cukurs' advocates and we are not his judges", Millers said at the premiere, "I hope this performance will make you think." Another performance initially scheduled for 17 March, the day after the Remembrance Day of the Latvian Legionnaires, was postponed in fear of "serious provocations". The musical was criticised by Zuroff who tweeted he was "utterly disgusted" by it, and Russian President Vladimir Putin called the musical a "vivid example" of open manifestations of neo-Nazism that he alleged had become "routine" in Latvia and other Baltic countries. Minister of Foreign Affairs of Latvia Edgars Rinkēvičs said the production "is not in good taste" and "cannot, in any way, be supported", but defended the producer's right to free speech.

In 2020, Stephan Talty published an account of the Mossad's hunt for Cukurs, titled The Good Assassin: How a Mossad Agent and a Band of Survivors Hunted Down the Butcher of Latvia.

== Awards ==
On 18 November 1937, Cukurs was awarded the Order of the Three Stars, IV class.

== Personal life ==
Cukurs had a daughter named Antinea Dolores Cukurs Rizzotto. Her granddaughter, Cukurs' great-granddaughter, is Latvian-Brazilian singer Laura Rizzotto.

== See also ==
- Rumbula massacre
- The Holocaust in Latvia
