= San José de Carrasco =

- Resort of Ciudad de la Costa
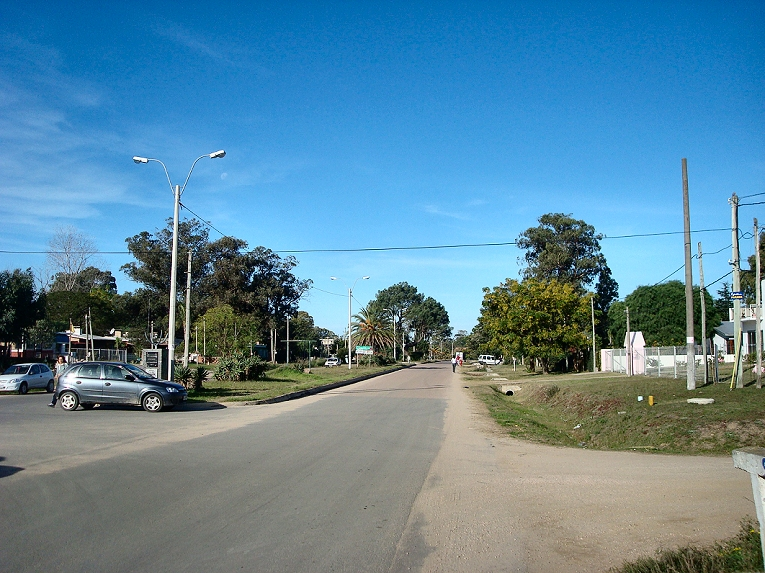
- Avenida General Alvear

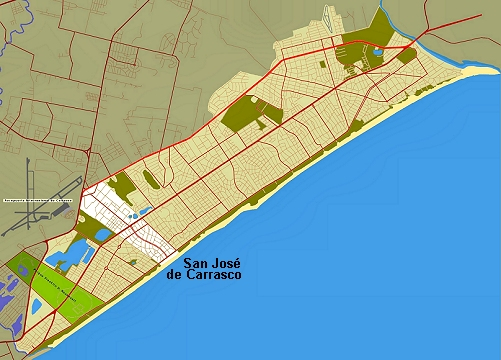
- Location of San José de Carrasco in Ciudad de la Costa
- Coordinates: 34°50′30″S 55°59′37″W
- Country: Uruguay
- Department: Canelones Department

Population (2011)
  - Total: 7,288
- Time zone: UTC -3
- Postal code: 15002
- Dial plan: +598 2 (+7 digits)

San José de Carrasco is a residential neighbourhood and resort of Ciudad de la Costa in Canelones, Uruguay.

== Geography ==
=== Location ===
This resort is located on the western area of Ciudad de la Costa, between the kilometers 20 and 21 on the Avenida Luis Giannattasio (Giannattasio Avenue) from the centre of Montevideo. Its limits are: Cruz del Sur street on the west, which separates San José de Carrasco from Shangrila neighborhood; Buenos Aires street on the east, which separates it from Lagomar neighborhood; Rio de la Plata on the south, and Ruta Interbalnearia on the north.

== Population ==
In 2011 San José de Carrasco had a population of 7,288.

Year	Population
1963	998
1975	2,591
1985	3,967
1996	6,068
2004	6,886
2011	7,288

Source: Instituto Nacional de Estadística de Uruguay

== Transport ==
The Coastal Avenue (Rambla Costanera) is divided by the long Avenida Luis Giannattasio, along which are concentrated the main commercial and service activities of the place. On the northern rim of the resort is the west-east Ruta Interbalnearia.

== Places of worship ==
- Parish Church of St. Mary of the Angels (Roman Catholic, Pallottines)

== Street map ==
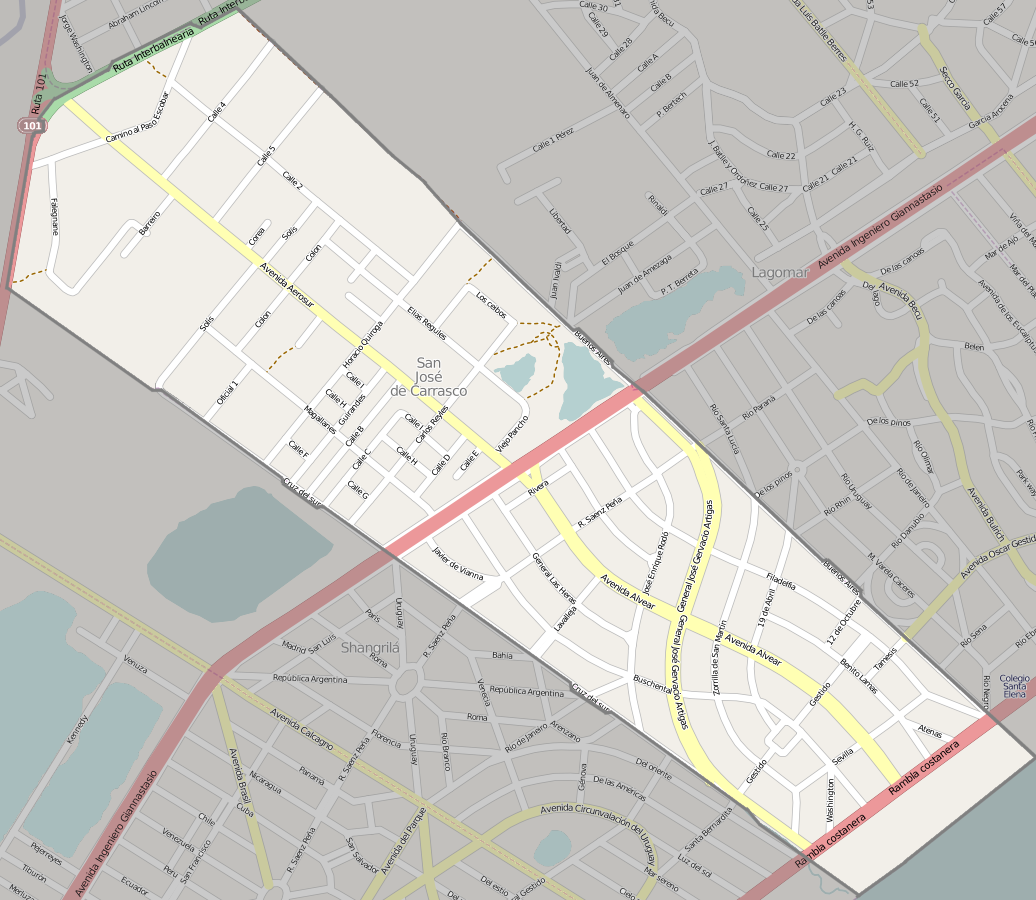
Street map of San José de Carrasco
