= Lomas de Solymar =

Lomas de Solymar Lomas y Médanos de Solymar
- Resort of Ciudad de la Costa
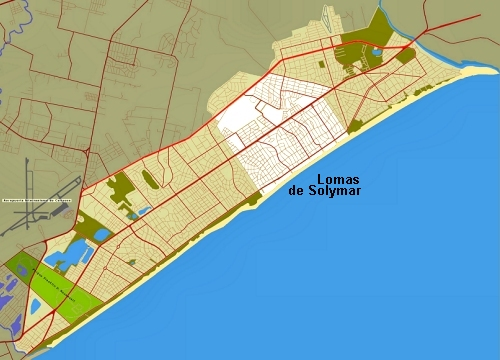
- Location of Lomas de Solymar in Ciudad de la Costa
- Coordinates: 34°48′47″S 55°56′25″W
- Country: Uruguay
- Department: Canelones Department

Population (2011)
  - Total: 19,124
- Time zone: UTC -3
- Postal code: 15006 & 15007
- Dial plan: +598 2 (+7 digits)

Lomas de Solymar, which also contains the area Médanos de Solymar, is a residential neighbourhood and a resort of Ciudad de la Costa in Canelones, Uruguay.

== Geography ==
This resort is located on the Ruta Interbalnearia between Solymar to the west and El Pinar to the east.

== Population ==
In 2011 Lomas de Solymar had a population of 19,124.

| Year | Population |
|---|---|
| 1963 | 135 |
| 1975 | 1,266 |
| 1985 | 3,974 |
| 1996 | 10,843 |
| 2004 | 16,018 |
| 2011 | 19,124 |

Source: Instituto Nacional de Estadística de Uruguay

== Street map ==
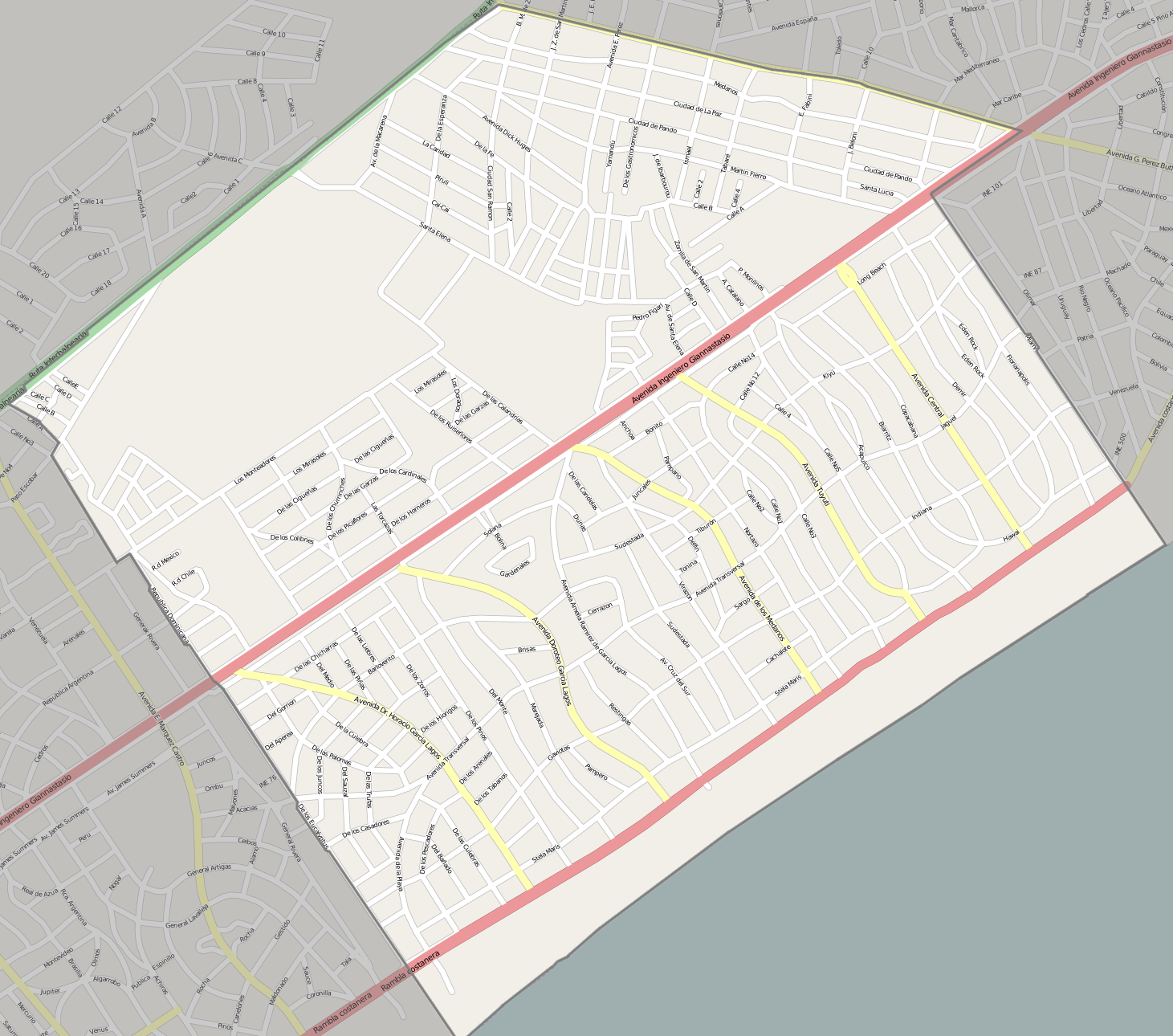
Street map of Lomas de Solymar
