= Curtiss-Wright CW-21 =

American fighter-interceptor plane

CW-21
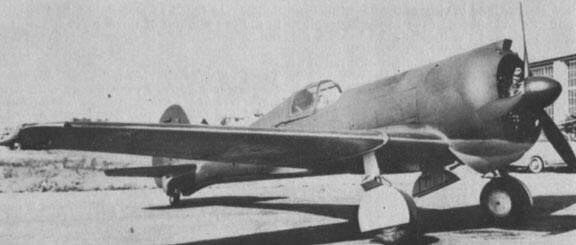
- CW-21B Demon, Netherlands East Indies Army Air Corps

General information
- Type: Fighter
- Manufacturer: Curtiss-Wright Corporation
- Primary users: Chinese Nationalist Air Force Royal Netherlands East Indies Army Air Force
- Number built: 62

History
- Manufactured: 1939–1940
- Introduction date: 1939
- First flight: 22 September 1938
- Developed from: Curtiss-Wright CW-19
- Developed into: Curtiss-Wright CW-22

The Curtiss-Wright Model 21 (also known as the Curtiss-Wright Model 21 Demonstrator, the Curtiss-Wright CW-21 Interceptor, the Curtiss-Wright CW-21 Demon) was an American fighter-interceptor developed by the St. Louis Airplane Division of Curtiss-Wright Corporation during the 1930s.

== Design and development ==
In 1938, George A. Page, head of the Saint Louis Airplane Division of Curtiss-Wright, decided to develop a fighter aircraft based on Carl W. Scott's two seater Model 19. Page's concept was a lightweight fighter interceptor with as high a rate of climb as possible in order to allow bomber formations to be attacked with minimal warning. If faced with fighter opposition, it was intended not to dogfight, but to use its superior climb rate to escape. While this was a direct contradiction to the United States Army Air Corps′ requirements for fighters (which stressed low-level performance), this did not concern Page, since the new fighter was intended for export.

Detailed design of the new fighter, the Model 21, or CW-21, was carried out by a team led by chief engineer Willis Wells. It was a single-seat, all-metal cantilever low-wing monoplane with retractable tailwheel landing gear, where the mainwheels retracted rearwards into fairings under the wing. The fuselage was a semi-monocoque structure that tapered sharply behind the pilot's cockpit. It was powered by a 1,000 hp (750 kW) Wright R-1820-G5 nine-cylinder air-cooled radial engine. It was designed to carry various combinations of two .30 in (7.62 mm) or .50 in (12.7 mm) machine guns, mounted in the nose and synchronized to fire through the propeller, while no armor or fuel tank protection was fitted in order to save weight and hence improve performance.

The prototype first flew on 22 September 1938, carrying the civil experimental registration NX19431. Although the CW-21 was not commissioned by the U.S. military, it was test flown at Wright Field in Dayton, Ohio. The Army Air Corps immediately rejected the aircraft, with one officer commenting that it took a genius to land it.

== Operational history ==
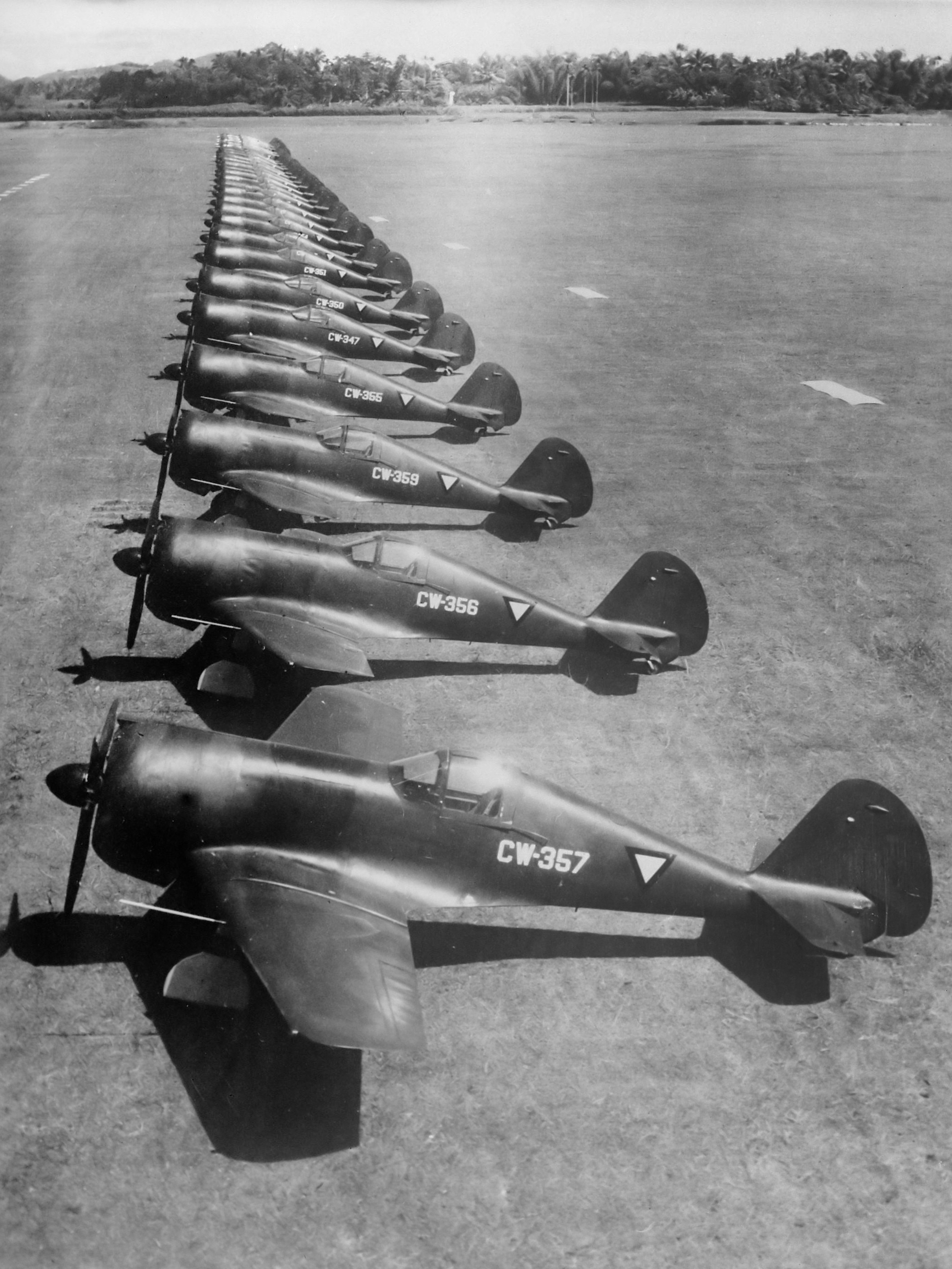
ML-KNIL Curtiss CW-21B lineup in 1941

The prototype CW-21 was delivered to China for evaluation by the Chinese Air Force. The Chinese were impressed by the CW-21's performance, and negotiation started on a Chinese purchase. While these negotiations were ongoing, the CW-21 prototype was flown in combat against Japanese bombers attacking Chongqing, with Curtiss test pilot Bob Fausel claiming a Fiat BR.20 bomber shot down on 4 April 1939. In May 1939, a contract was signed, with China receiving the prototype and three complete examples built by Curtiss, as well as kits for 27 more aircraft. Assembly would be undertaken by the Central Aircraft Manufacturing Company (CAMCO) at Loiwing, near the China-Burma border. These were to be armed with two .50 in (12.7 mm) and two .30 in (7.62 mm) machine guns.

The three Curtiss-built aircraft were shipped to China in May 1940 and were eventually handed over to the 1st American Volunteer Group (Flying Tigers), who intended to use them to tackle high-flying Japanese reconnaissance aircraft. These crashed and were destroyed, due to poor visibility, on a flight from Rangoon to Kunming on 23 December 1941. Of the 27 to be assembled by CAMCO, none were completed before CAMCO was forced by advancing Japanese forces to evacuate its Loiwing factory to India in 1942.

Curtiss had meanwhile developed an improved version of the CW-21, the CW-21B. The main difference was a new undercarriage with inward-retracting mainwheels and a semi-retractable tail wheel which had been developed for the Curtiss-Wright CW-23 armed trainer, with other changes including hydraulically operated flaps. Although heavier, the CW-21B was 18 mph (29 km/h) faster than the original CW-21, albeit with a reduced rate of climb.

In April 1940, the Dutch Army Aviation Brigade Luchtvaartbrigade, desperate for modern combat aircraft, placed an order for 24 CW-21Bs from Curtiss-Wright. After the Battle of the Netherlands, which resulted in the Dutch Army surrendering to the invading Germans on 15 May 1940, the order for the CW-21Bs (together with a number of Curtiss Model 75 fighters and Curtiss-Wright CW-22 trainers), was transferred to the government of the Dutch East Indies (now Indonesia), for the Militaire Luchtvaart van het Koninklijk Nederlands-Indisch Leger ("Military Aviation of the Royal Netherlands East Indies Army"; ML-KNIL).

The 24 CW-21Bs were assembled at Andir airfield, Bandung, Java, in February 1941, equipping Vliegtuiggroep IV, Afdeling 2 ("Air Group IV, No. 2 Squadron"; 2-VLG IV). The lightweight construction of the Curtiss-Wrights gave rise to structural problems, and several aircraft were grounded by cracks in the undercarriage, and were still awaiting repair when war with Japan began on 8 December 1941.

With its light construction, radial engine, low wing loading, limited pilot protection and lack of self-sealing fuel tanks, the CW-21B was the Allied fighter most similar to the opposing Japanese fighters. It had a rate of climb superior to the Nakajima Ki-43-I ("Oscar") and Mitsubishi A6M2 Zero. The CW-21B had similar firepower to the "Oscar", but worse than the cannon-armed Zero. 2-VLG IV claimed four aerial victories during the Netherlands East Indies campaign, but the ML-KNIL was overwhelmed by the sheer number of Japanese aircraft; almost all of its fighters were soon lost in combat or destroyed on the ground.

== Variants ==
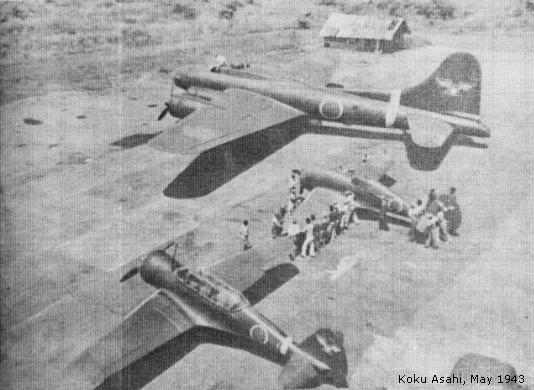
A Model 21 (centre) alongside a Boeing B-17 Flying Fortress and Curtiss-Wright CW-22, all three of which were captured by Japan during World War II

Model 21
Interceptor. One prototype built in 1938 (c/n 21-1 / NX19431). Three production units and a total of 27 sets of components shipped to the Republic of China to be assembled by CAMCO. Easily identifiable by the Seversky P-35 type of main undercarriage fairings; 31 built (unknown number assembled and flown).
Model 21A
Interceptor. Proposed design to use the Allison V-1710; not built.
Model 21B
Interceptor. A total of 24 built for the Netherlands East Indies, easily identifiable by the inward retracting main landing gear, that eliminated the need for the undercarriage fairings notable on the Model 21.

== Operators ==
China

- Chinese Nationalist Air Force
- American Volunteer Group
  - 1st American Volunteer Group (Flying Tigers)

(Netherlands) Dutch East Indies

- Royal Netherlands East Indies Army Air Force

== Specifications (CW-21B) ==
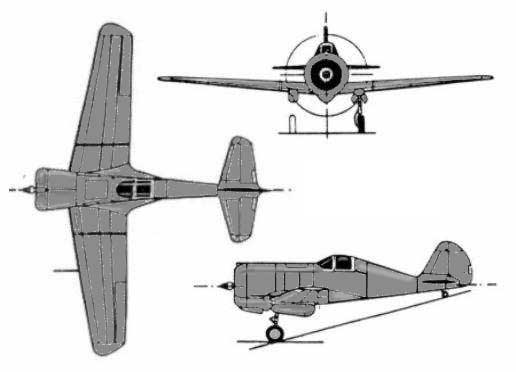
Curtiss-Wright CW-21 3-view drawing

Data from Curtiss Aircraft 1907–1947

General characteristics

- Crew: 1
- Length: 27 ft 2.5 in (8.293 m)
- Wingspan: 35 ft 0 in (10.67 m)
- Height: 8 ft 2 in (2.49 m)
- Wing area: 174.3 sq ft (16.19 m^{2})
- Airfoil: Curtiss CW-19 Special
- Empty weight: 3,382 lb (1,534 kg)
- Gross weight: 4,500 lb (2,041 kg)
- Powerplant: 1 × Wright R-1820-G5 Cyclone 9-cylinder air-cooled radial piston engine, 850 hp (630 kW)
- Propellers: 3-bladed variable-pitch propeller

Performance

- Maximum speed: 314 mph (505 km/h, 273 kn) at 12,200 ft (3,700 m)
- Cruise speed: 282 mph (454 km/h, 245 kn)
- Range: 630 mi (1,010 km, 550 nmi)
- Service ceiling: 34,300 ft (10,500 m)
- Rate of climb: 4,500 ft/min (23 m/s)

Armament

- Guns: typically:-
  - 2 × .50 in (12.7 mm) M2 Browning machine guns
  - 2 × .30 in (7.62 mm) M1919 Browning machine guns

== See also ==
Related development

- Curtiss-Wright CW-19
- Curtiss-Wright CW-22

Aircraft of comparable role, configuration, and era

- Bloch MB.152
- Caudron C.714
- IAR 80
- Macchi MC.200
- Reggiane Re.2000
- Weiss Manfréd WM-23 Ezüst Nyíl

Related lists

- List of fighter aircraft
- List of aircraft of World War II
