= Barra de Carrasco =

- Resort of Ciudad de la Costa
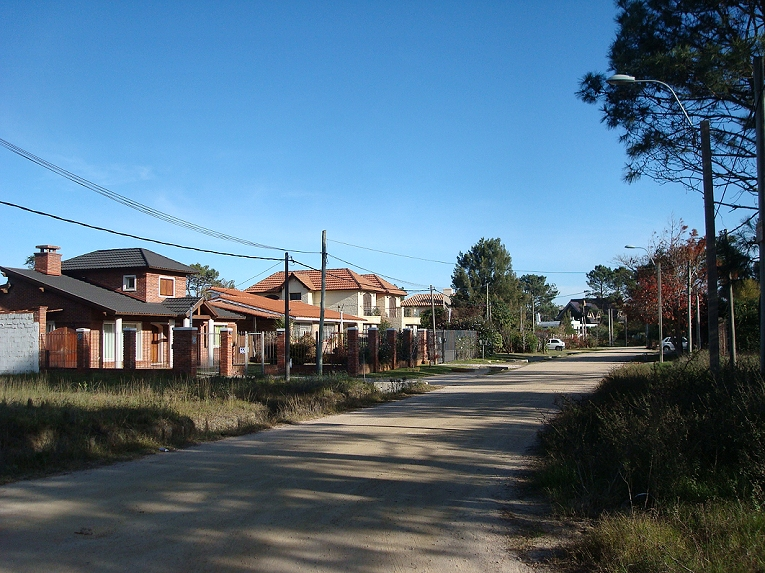
- Residential street in Barra de Carrasco

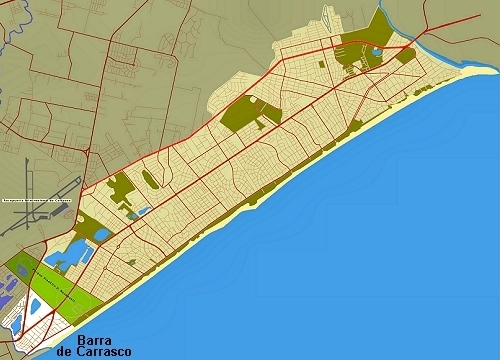
- Location of Barra de Carrasco in Ciudad de la Costa
- Coordinates: 34°52′17″S 56°1′38″W
- Country: Uruguay
- Department: Canelones Department

Population (2011)
  - Total: 5,410
- Time zone: UTC -3
- Postal code: 15000
- Dial plan: +598 2 (+7 digits)

Barra de Carrasco is a residential neighbourhood and resort of Ciudad de la Costa in Canelones, Uruguay. Its name means "mouth of the Carrasco Creek".

== Geography ==
=== Location ===
It is located adjacent to Carrasco, an eastern neighbourhood (barrio) of Montevideo, on the Río de la Plata coast. It covers an area of roughly 2.2 square kilometres (0.85 sq mi).

== Population ==
In 2011, Barra de Carrasco had population was 5,410.

Year	Population
1963	524
1975	1,701
1985	2,815
1996	4,306
2004	4,747
2011	5,410

Source: Instituto Nacional de Estadística de Uruguay

== Street map ==
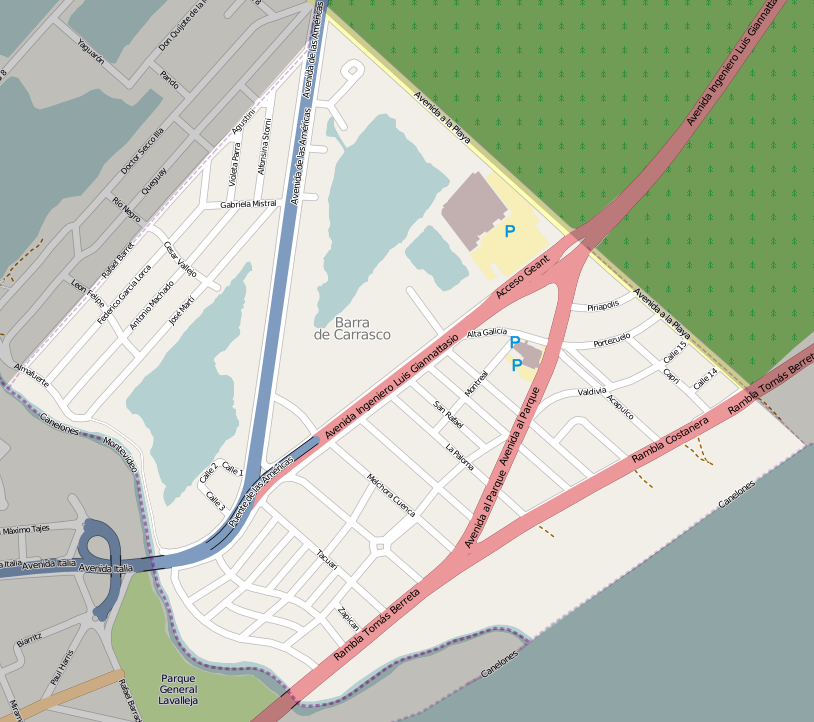
Street map of Barra de Carrasco
