= Curtiss-Wright CW-19 =

American civil utility aircraft and military trainer

CR-2, CW-19, and CW-23
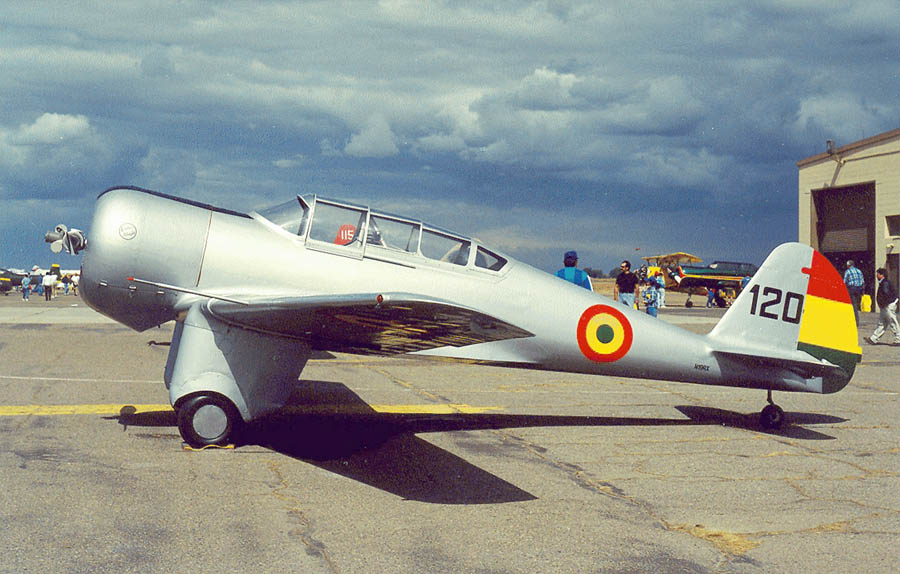
- Curtiss-Wright CW-19 Coupe

General information
- Type: Civil utility aircraft
- Manufacturer: Curtiss-Robertson Airplane Manufacturing Company, Curtiss-Wright
- Primary users: Bolivian Armed Forces Ecuadorian Air Force
- Number built: 26

History
- First flight: 1935
- Developed into: Curtiss-Wright CW-21; Curtiss-Wright CW-22

The Curtiss-Wright CW-19 was a civil utility aircraft designed in the United States in the mid-1930s and built in small quantities in a number of variants including the CW-23 military trainer prototype.

== Design and development ==
Originally conceived as the Curtiss-Robertson CR-2 Coupe shortly before the Curtiss-Wright merger and the dropping of the Curtiss-Robertson brand, it was an all-metal, low-wing cantilever monoplane of conventional configuration with fixed tailwheel undercarriage and side-by-side seating for two. A prominent feature on all versions other than the original CR-2 prototypes was the large "trouser"-style wheel spats. While the design was never perfected for the civil market it was originally intended for, a militarized version was soon developed that replaced the side-by-side cabin with tandem seating and added provision for guns and bombs.

== Production ==
Twenty-six CW-19s of all types were produced. The first was a single CW-19L built in 1935, known as either "Coupe" or "Sparrow" in documents. It would be purchased by the US Government and assigned the registration number NS-69. The second aircraft built was a CW-19W, which featured a much more powerful 145 hp Warner Super Scarab in place of the Lambert engine. It was decided that this aircraft was not well-suited for private civil aviation, and was also discontinued after one prototype.

The military-grade CW-19R saw a significant revision to the cockpit and canopy, removing the old "Coupe" design and replacing it with a tandem-seat sliding glass canopy. Powerplant options varied between the Wright R-760E2 and Wright R-975E3. A variety of armament options were also available, including a synchronized fuselage-mounted machine gun firing through the propeller arc, two gun pods mounted outboard of the landing gear, a flexible mount for the second aviator to use as a defensive turret, bombs, and an auxiliary fuel tank. Twenty two examples would be produced and would be the only version to be sold, with the majority going to South and Central American countries.

The CW-A19R was an unarmed version of the CW-19R intended for the USAAC but without any success. It would also be offered on the civil market as the ATC A-629. A total of two CW-A19R would be completed—one company demonstrator for Curtiss-Wright and one sold to a private owner. A third was not completed and rebuilt as a CW-22.

A CW-B19R was planned and advertised, based upon the CW-A19R but with a four or five-seat civilian cabin, but it was not built.

== Operational history ==
Curtiss-Wright hoped that in its militarized form the CW-19 could be sold on the export market as a ground-attack machine. But orders were disappointing, with two sold to the Dominican Republic, ten to Bolivia, six to Ecuador, and three to Cuba. Additionally, one example was delivered to China where it was likely purchased. An unarmed trainer version was also developed and offered to the USAAC but no orders were placed.

In a final attempt to find a market for the design, engine power was increased from 450 hp (340 kW) to 600 hp (450 kW), and a retractable undercarriage was fitted. In this form, designated CW-23, the aircraft was offered once again to the USAAC, this time as an advanced trainer, but once again the service was not interested. The CW-19 did, however, form the basis of the far more successful CW-21 and CW-22 designs.

== Variants ==
- CR-2 - Curtiss-Robertson prototype with strut-braced wing and unfaired undercarriage (two built)
- Model 19L - prototype with cantilever wing, spatted undercarriage and Lambert R-266 engine (one built)
- Model 19W - prototype with Warner Super Scarab engine (one built)
- Model 19Q - Lycoming R-680-B2 Seaplane design (none built)
- Model 19R Fighter - militarized version with tandem seating, weapons mountings, and Wright J-6-7 engine (23 built)
- Model 19R Long Range Trainer - Extra center mounted 35 gallon aux tank pod. One fixed forward gun, one rear manned gun.
- Model 19R Light Bomber - Two .30 cal guns with two A-3 bomb racks. (563 lb)
- Model 19R Photo Reconnaissance - Two bottom mounted camera ports.
- Model 19R Attack (special) - single seat with wing mounted guns (none built)
- Model 19R Advanced Trainer - Pratt & Whitney R-760-E2 or R-975-E3 engine choices.
- Model 19R Seaplane - proposed 1936 variant of the 19Q (none built)
  - Model A19R - military trainer offered to USAAC (three built, one later converted to CW-22)
  - Model B19R - projected civil version of Model A19R (none built)
  - Model C19R - Amphibian standard trainer R-975-E3 (none built)
  - Model C19R - Amphibian advanced trainer (none built)
  - Model C19R - Amphibian fighter - One forward gun, one manned gun (none built)
  - Model C19R - Amphibian photographic aircraft - Fairchild KB-3 camera mount
  - Model C19Z - Standard Amphibian or Seaplane trainer - Pratt & Whitney Wasp SC-G
- CW-23 - advanced military trainer with Pratt & Whitney R-1340 engine and retractable undercarriage (one built)

== Operators ==
- Bolivia received 10 CW-19Rs in 1938, with four remaining in service in 1949.
- China received one CW-19R.
- Cuba received three CW-19Rs in 1937, one remaining in service until 1948.
- Dominican Republic purchased two CW-19Rs in 1937.
- Ecuador received six in 1936, remaining in service until 1943.

== Surviving aircraft ==
Surviving CW-19R being unloaded from a trailer in Florida

One CW-19 was originally shipped from La Paz, Bolivia to Patrick AFB on April 12, 1995 by owner Debra Boostrom-Hoedebecke of Dixie Air Supply aboard a Bolivian Air Force C-130. It was then trucked to San Antonio, Texas for restoration and preparation for flight to Oshkosh, Wisconsin for the annual fly-in. In accordance with the verbal agreement between Debra Boostrom-Hoedebecke and Bolivian government, the Bolivian markings were retained on the aircraft.

== Specifications (CW-19R) ==
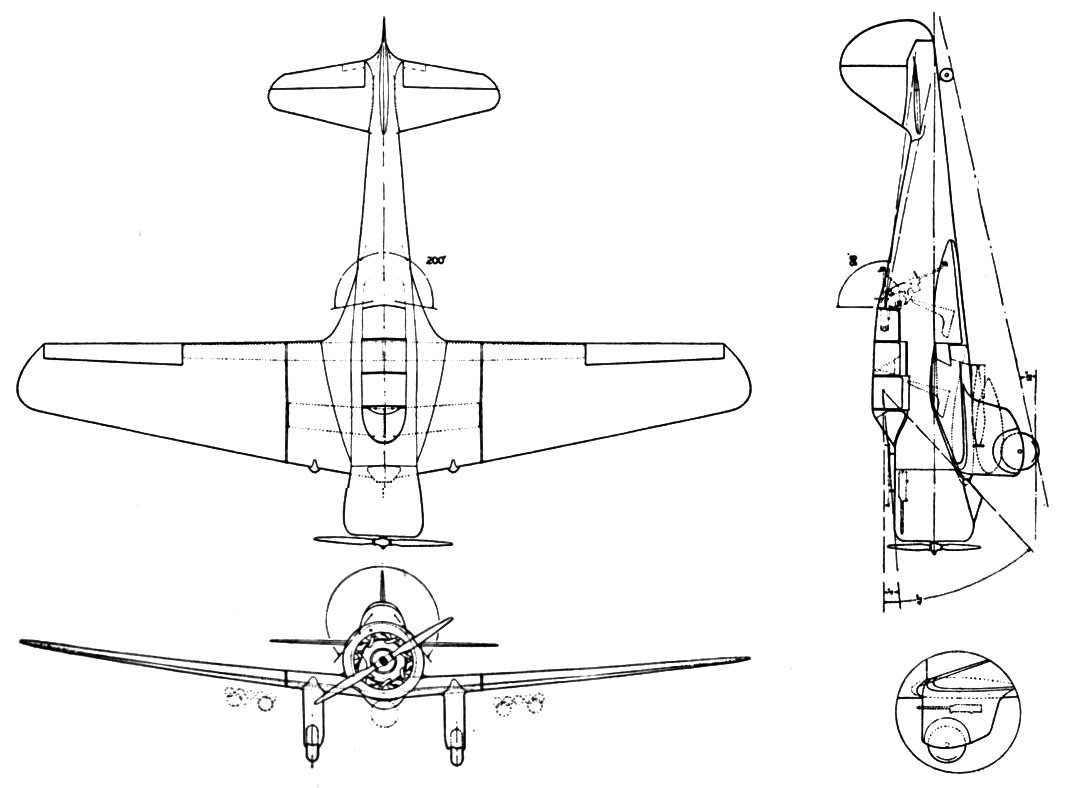
Curtiss-Wright CW-19R 3-view drawing from L'Aerophile February 1937

Data from Curtiss Aircraft 1907–1947

General characteristics

- Crew: 2
- Length: 26 ft 4 in (8.03 m)
- Wingspan: 35 ft 0 in (10.67 m)
- Height: 7 ft 2 in (2.18 m)
- Wing area: 174 sq ft (16.2 m^{2})
- Airfoil: Curtiss CW-19 Special
- Empty weight: 1,400 lb (635 kg)
- Gross weight: 3,500 lb (1,588 kg)
- Powerplant: 1 × Wright R-760E2 Whirlwind 7-cylinder air-cooled radial piston engine, 350 hp (260 kW)
- Propellers: 2-bladed fixed-pitch metal propeller

Performance

- Maximum speed: 185 mph (298 km/h, 161 kn)
- Cruise speed: 164 mph (264 km/h, 143 kn)
- Rate of climb: 1,890 ft/min (9.6 m/s)-

Armament

- Guns: 1 to 3 × fixed, forward-firing 0.300 in (7.62 mm) machine-gun + 1 × trainable, rearward-firing 0.300 in (7.62 mm) machine-gun
- Bombs: provision for underwing bomb load

== See also ==
Related development

- Curtiss-Wright CW-21
- Curtiss-Wright CW-22
