= Colinas de Solymar =

- Resort of Ciudad de la Costa
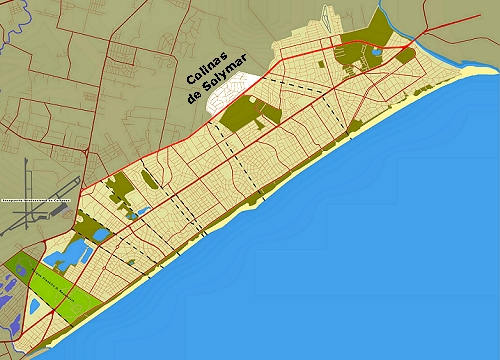
- Location of Colinas de Solymar in Ciudad de la Costa
- Coordinates: 34°48′7″S 55°57′28″W
- Country: Uruguay
- Department: Canelones Department

Population (2011)
  - Total: 2,813
- Time zone: UTC -3
- Postal code: 15006-7
- Dial plan: +598 2 (+7 digits)

Colinas de Solymar is a small town and northern suburb of Ciudad de la Costa in the Canelones Department of southern Uruguay.

== Population ==
In 2011 Colinas de Solymar had a population of 2,813.

Year	Population
1975	123
1985	757
1996	1,768
2004	2,502
2011	2,813

Source: Instituto Nacional de Estadística de Uruguay

== Street map ==
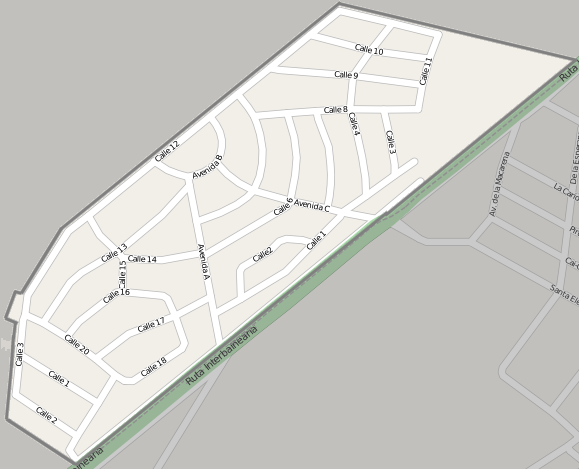
Street map of Colinas de Solymar
