= Parque Carrasco =

- Resort of Ciudad de la Costa
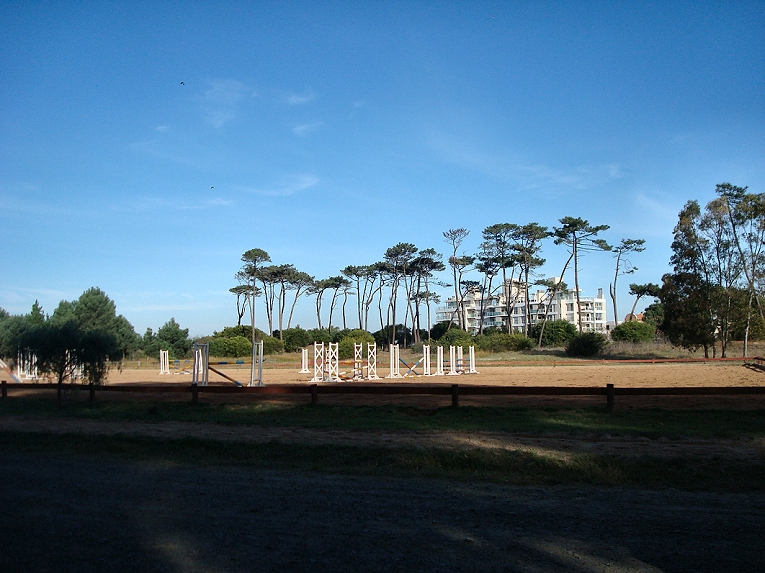
- Centro Hípico in Parque Carrasco.

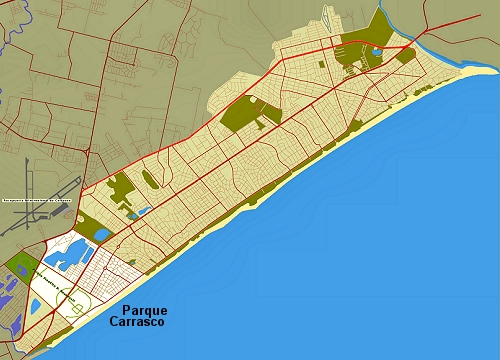
- Location of Parque Carrasco in Ciudad de la Costa
- Coordinates: 34°51′18″S 56°0′54″W
- Country: Uruguay
- Department: Canelones Department

Population (2011)
  - Total: 8,628
- Time zone: UTC -3
- Postal code: 15000
- Dial plan: +598 2 (+7 digits)

Parque Carrasco is a residential neighbourhood and resort of Ciudad de la Costa in Canelones, Uruguay.

== Geography ==
This resort is located near Montevideo, on the Río de la Plata coast. It became part of Ciudad de la Costa on 19 October 1994, upon foundation of the city.

== Population ==
In 2011 Parque Carrasco had a population of 8,628.

| Year | Population |
|---|---|
| 1963 | 922 |
| 1975 | 3,914 |
| 1985 | 5,658 |
| 1996 | 8,169 |
| 2004 | 8,476 |
| 2011 | 8,628 |

Source: Instituto Nacional de Estadística de Uruguay

== Street map ==
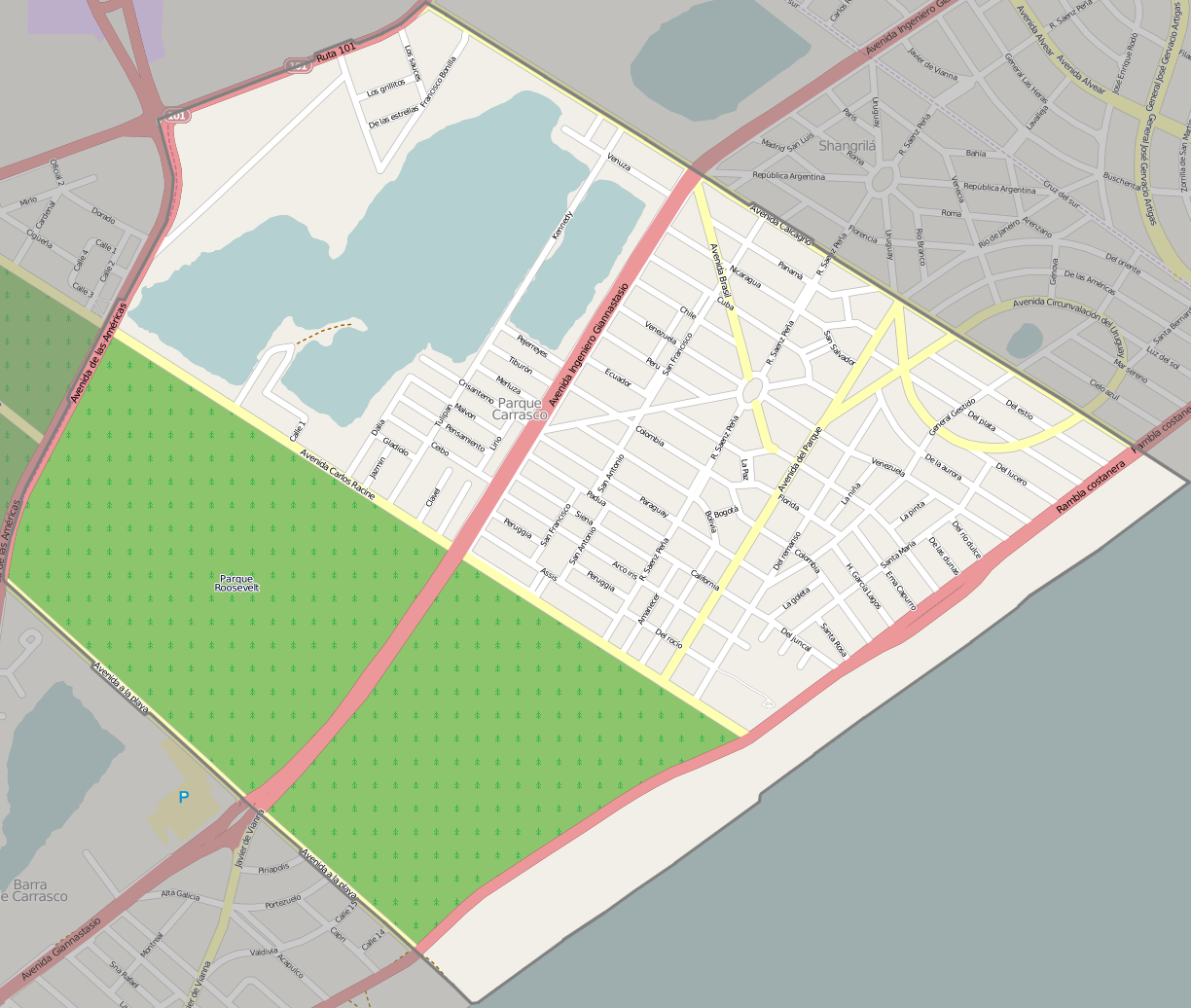
Street map of Parque Carrasco
