= Ciudad de la Costa =

- City and Municipality
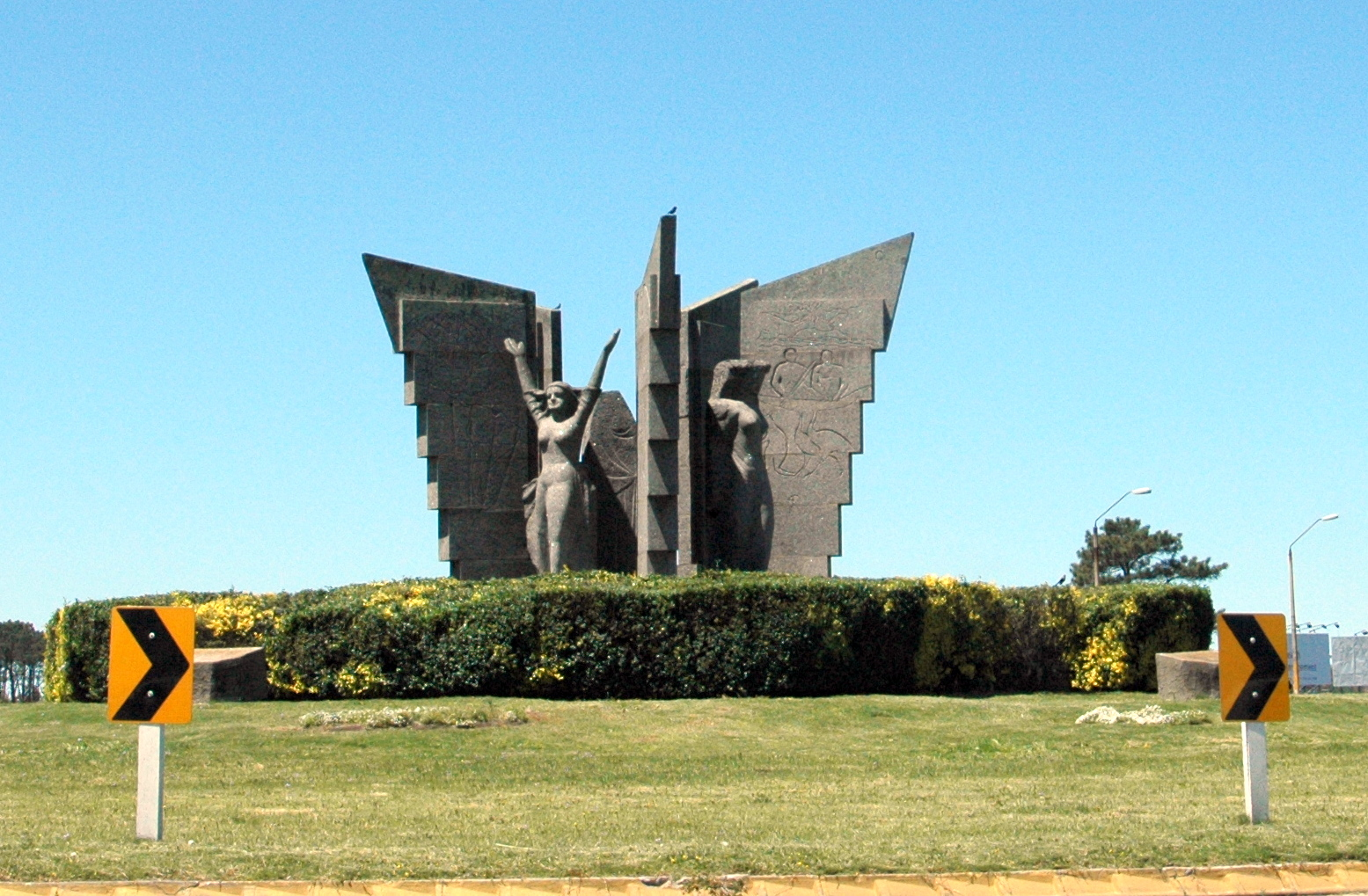
- Monument in Ciudad de la Costa, by sculptor Bernabé Michelena

- Location in Uruguay
- Coordinates: 34°49′0″S 55°57′0″W
- Country: Uruguay
- Department: Canelones
- Founded: 1994

Area
  - City and Municipality: 51.25 km^{2} (19.79 sq mi)
  - Urban: 57 km^{2} (22 sq mi)
- Elevation: 17 m (56 ft)

Population (2023 Census)
  - City and Municipality: 113,252
- Time zone: UTC -3
- Postal codes: 15000 - 15008
- Dial plan: +598 2 (+7 digits)
- Climate: Cfa

Location map of the Municipality of Ciudad de la Costa

Ciudad de la Costa is a city in Canelones Department of Uruguay, on the banks of the Río de la Plata between the streams Arroyo Carrasco and Arroyo Pando. It is considered an extension of the metropolitan area of Montevideo which it borders to the west, while to the east it borders Costa de Oro. It was declared a city on 19 October 1994 and given its current name. At the 2011 census, it was the second most populated city of Uruguay between Montevideo and Salto.

Ciudad de la Costa is also the name of the municipality to which the city belongs, but which does not include the area of Barra de Carrasco.

== History ==
The area, characterized by a sandy beach 16 km long, was known as "Rincón de Carrasco" during the 19th century. It was populated gradually during the 20th century, forming a series of resorts starting from Barra de Carrasco in the west, up to El Pinar in the east. The various resorts became characterized by a high floating population that inhabited the area only in summer or on weekends, while most of the permanent population worked in Montevideo.

The abundance of sandy soils made possible the existence of multiple sand pits, which gave rise to the various lakes that characterize the area. Some lakes are used for bathing and water sports, while others are not suitable for these applications and, instead, act as a refuge for many species of birds and animals.

== Population ==
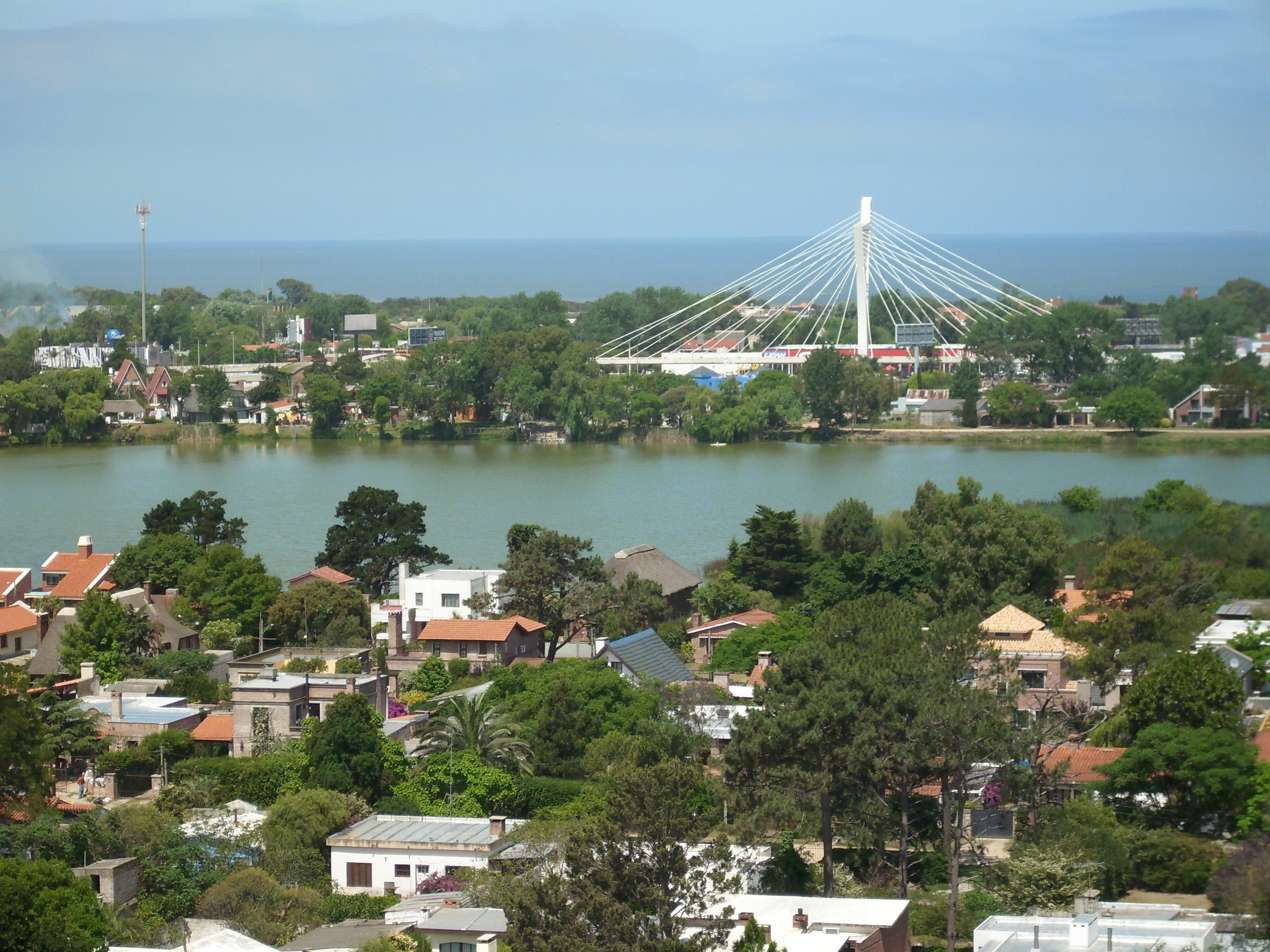
Bridge of the Americas, Ciudad de la Costa.

Since the 1980s there was an explosive growth of population due to an expansive process of Montevideo. According to the census of 1996, its population reached 66,402 inhabitants, 92.6% more than in 1985. The various resorts began to merge to form a unit that actually led to its declaration as a city. The growth in subsequent years has continued at a slower pace. At the census of 2004, the population was 83,888 inhabitants, 28.8% more than in 1996. The coastal city is the largest satellite town of the metropolitan area and the third largest city in Uruguay.

In 2010, the Intendencia de Canelones recorded a population of 79,412 for the municipality during the elections.

The census 2011 results show a total population of 95,176 inhabitants. This number reflects the total sum of the neighborhoods that belong to the municipality. The National Statistics Institute, however, has posted some more areas, outside the municipality, as parts of Ciudad de la Costa, a detailed count of which is given in a separate table below. Were these areas to be counted in, the population would rise to 112,447, making it thus the second largest city of Uruguay. There are no other official sources supporting this count, however, leaving Salto as the second city in terms of population.

The population growth has not been accompanied by an adequate development of infrastructure services, so that much of the city lacks public sanitation and many roads are often impassable during rainy periods. Despite these difficulties, the Ciudad de la Costa is now a commercial and tourist centre of importance in the country. The Carrasco International Airport is located north of the city, and Autodromo Victor Borrat Fabini to the east.

== Geography ==
=== Climate ===
Ciudad de la Costa has a humid subtropical climate typical of the region, with warm to hot and wet summers and mild winters with relatively evenly distributed precipitation year-round.

Climate data for Ciudad de la Costa (Carrasco International Airport) 1991–2020, extremes 1951–2020
Month	Jan	Feb	Mar	Apr	May	Jun	Jul	Aug	Sep	Oct	Nov	Dec	Year
Record high °C (°F)	39.6 (103.3)	39.8 (103.6)	37.0 (98.6)	35.0 (95.0)	31.9 (89.4)	28.2 (82.8)	29.8 (85.6)	33.2 (91.8)	34.3 (93.7)	34.0 (93.2)	37.7 (99.9)	39.9 (103.8)	39.9 (103.8)
Mean daily maximum °C (°F)	27.3 (81.1)	26.7 (80.1)	25.2 (77.4)	21.9 (71.4)	18.5 (65.3)	15.6 (60.1)	14.5 (58.1)	16.5 (61.7)	17.6 (63.7)	20.2 (68.4)	23.2 (73.8)	26.0 (78.8)	21.1 (70.0)
Daily mean °C (°F)	22.6 (72.7)	22.3 (72.1)	20.8 (69.4)	17.7 (63.9)	14.4 (57.9)	11.5 (52.7)	10.6 (51.1)	12.1 (53.8)	13.4 (56.1)	16.0 (60.8)	18.6 (65.5)	21.2 (70.2)	16.8 (62.2)
Mean daily minimum °C (°F)	17.9 (64.2)	17.9 (64.2)	16.4 (61.5)	13.5 (56.3)	10.3 (50.5)	7.4 (45.3)	6.6 (43.9)	7.7 (45.9)	9.2 (48.6)	11.7 (53.1)	13.9 (57.0)	16.3 (61.3)	12.4 (54.3)
Record low °C (°F)	7.6 (45.7)	7.2 (45.0)	6.2 (43.2)	1.3 (34.3)	−1.0 (30.2)	−7.4 (18.7)	−5.4 (22.3)	−3.2 (26.2)	−3.6 (25.5)	1.5 (34.7)	3.4 (38.1)	6.5 (43.7)	−7.4 (18.7)
Average precipitation mm (inches)	93.1 (3.67)	95.5 (3.76)	112.3 (4.42)	106.5 (4.19)	87.8 (3.46)	95.3 (3.75)	96.5 (3.80)	93.1 (3.67)	92.6 (3.65)	105.3 (4.15)	92.4 (3.64)	92.7 (3.65)	1,163.1 (45.79)
Average precipitation days (≥ 1.0 mm)	6	7	7	7	7	7	7	7	7	8	7	7	84
Average relative humidity (%)	68	71	74	75	78	79	78	75	74	72	70	68	73
Mean monthly sunshine hours	287.0	233.9	224.2	183.6	159.1	131.5	148.3	165.2	187.7	207.3	245.8	273.7	2,447.3
Source 1: Instituto Uruguayo de Metereología
Source 2: NOAA (precipitation and sun 1991–2020) Instituto Nacional de Investigación Agropecuaria (humidity 1980–2009)

== Coastal resorts of Ciudad de la Costa ==
Population of the resorts according to 2011 census.

Resort	Post code	Population
El Pinar	15800	21,091
Lomas de Solymar	15006-7	19,124
Solymar	15005	18,573
Parque Carrasco	15000	8,628
Lagomar	15000	8,066
San José de Carrasco	15002	7,288
Barra de Carrasco	15000	5,410
Shangrilá	15001	3,195
Colinas de Solymar	15006-7	2,813
El Bosque	15004	988

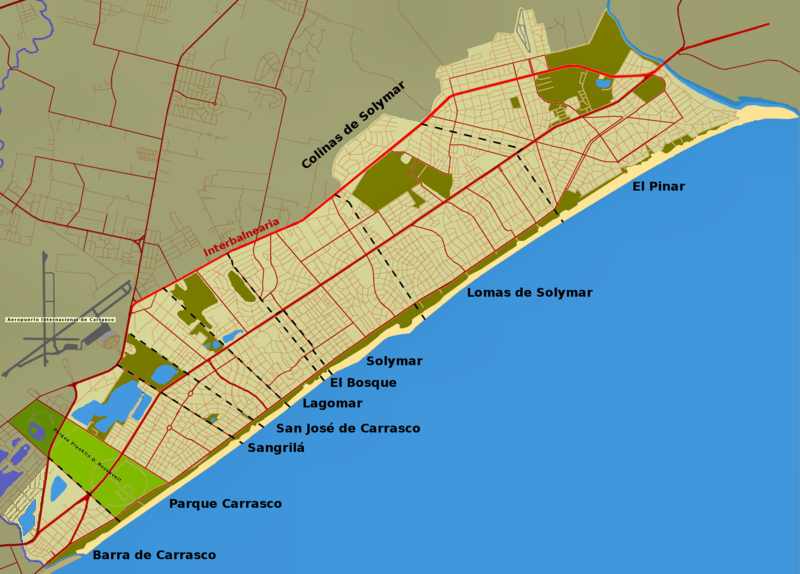
Coastal resorts of Ciudad de la Costa

Source: Instituto Nacional de Estadística de Uruguay

The area of Lomas de Solymar also contains Parque de Solymar, Montes de Solymar and Médanos de Solymar. Postal code 15007 has been assigned to Médanos de Solymar.

== Other entities part of Ciudad de la Costa (city) ==
The 2011 census results mention the following non-coastal censual areas as parts of Ciudad de la Costa. These areas do not belong to the municipality of Ciudad de la Costa. See section Population above.

Locality	Population
Paso de Carrasco	15,908
Lomas de Carrasco	806
La Asunción	184
Altos de la Tahona	168
Carmel	80
Haras del Lago	68
Quintas del Bosque	57

== Landmarks ==
North of the Ruta Interbalnearia there is a private cemetery, Parque del Recuerdo.

== See also ==
- Canelones
- Costa de Oro
