= Carrasco Creek =

Coordinates: 34.8778°S 56.0244°W

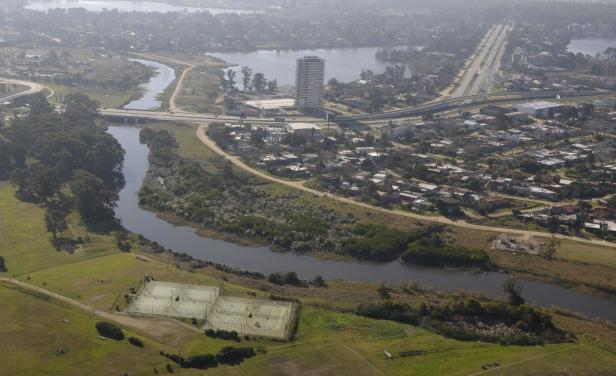

Location
- Country: Uruguay

Physical characteristics
- Mouth
  - location: Río de la Plata
- Length: 16 km (9.9 mi)

Carrasco Creek (Spanish: Arroyo Carrasco) is a Uruguayan stream, separating Canelones Department and Montevideo Department. It flows from the Carrasco Swamps into the Río de la Plata.

It is one of the most contaminated water streams in the country.

== See also ==
- List of rivers of Uruguay
