= Lagomar =

- Resort of Ciudad de la Costa
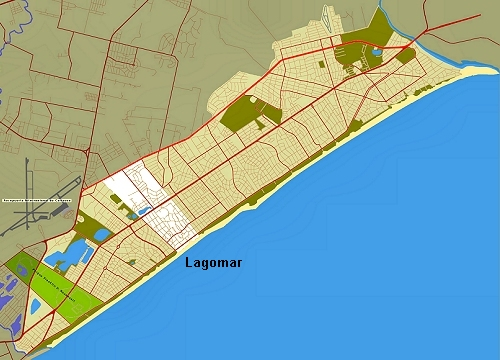
- Location of Lagomar in Ciudad de la Costa
- Coordinates: 34°50′9″S 55°59′6″W
- Country: Uruguay
- Department: Canelones Department

Population (2011)
  - Total: 8,066
- Time zone: UTC -3
- Postal code: 15000
- Dial plan: +598 2 (+7 digits)

Lagomar is a residential neighbourhood and resort of Ciudad de la Costa in Canelones, Uruguay.

== Geography ==
This resort is located just east of the Carrasco neighborhood (barrio) of eastern Montevideo, on the Río de la Plata coast.

== History ==
The name of the resort is in association with the saline waters of the lake just north of Avenida Luis Giannattasio (lake by the sea, sea being the Rio de la Plata). Lagomar was created as a resort in 1952 and was developed as part of the Costa de Oro near Montevideo and Canelones. It changed its profile from the 1970s, when it gradually reached a breaking point because of population pressure, becoming a permanent residential area for the middle and upper middle classes. Between 1985 and 1996 the population grew 42%. To meet this population increase, in the second half of the 1990s it became further urbanized with shops and facilities. The resort became part of the Ciudad de la Costa by Act of October 19, 1994.

== Population ==
In 2011, Lagomar had a population of 8,066.

Year	Population
1963	418
1975	3,127
1985	4,949
1996	7,021
2004	7,798
2011	8,066

Source: Instituto Nacional de Estadística de Uruguay

== Transport ==
Route 10 passes along the seafront leading from Carrasco, known as the Rambla de Montevideo. Lagomar is divided by the long Avenida Luis Giannattasio, along which are concentrated the main commercial and service activities of the place. The major roads named Rio de Janeiro and Buenos Aires connect this avenue to the Rambla on coast. On the northern rim of the resort is the west–east Ruta Interbalnearia.

== Street map ==
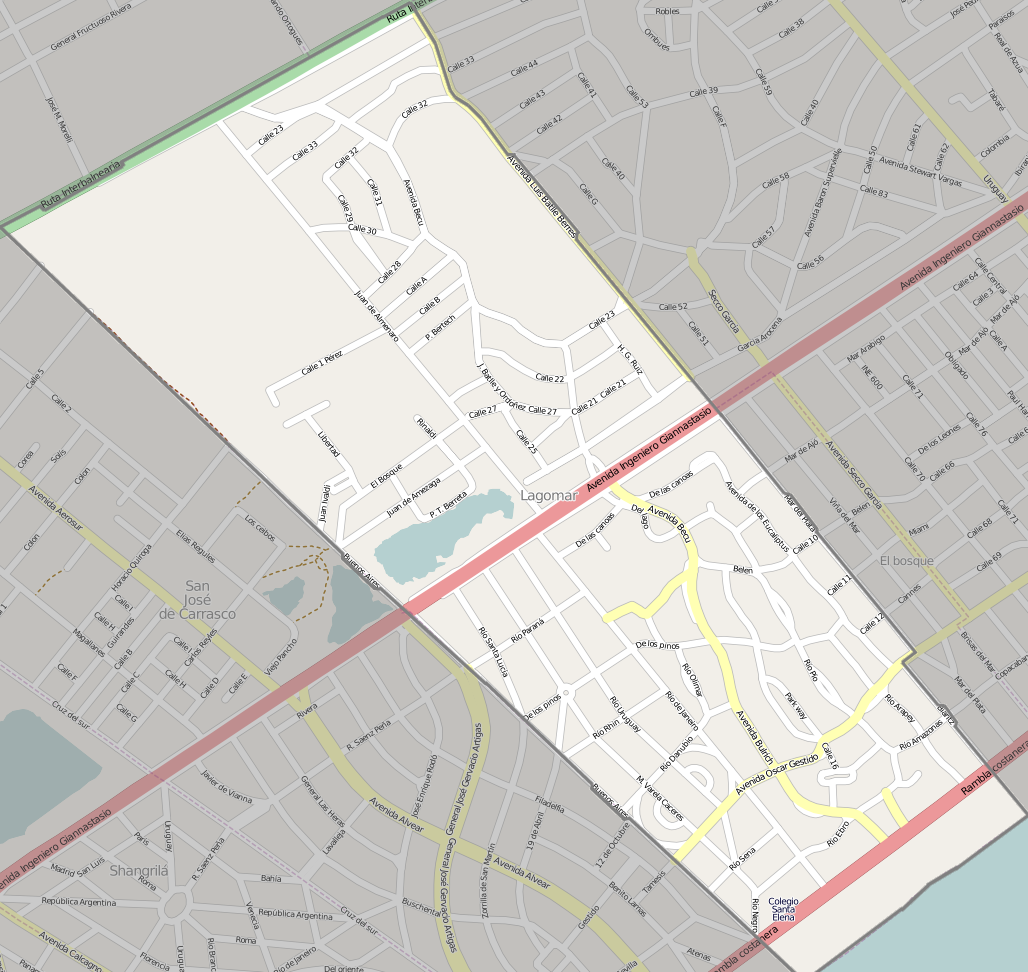
Street map of Lagomar
