= Route 8 (Uruguay) =

Road in Uruguay

Route 8
- Ruta 8
- Brigadier General Juan Antonio Lavalleja

Route information
- Maintained by Ministry of Transport & Public Works
- Length: 442 km (275 mi)

Major junctions
- South end: Montevideo
- North end: Aceguá

Location
- Country: Uruguay

Highway system
- National Routes of Uruguay
| ← Route 1 | → Route 26 |

Route 8 is a national route of Uruguay. In 1975, it was assigned the name Brigadier General Juan Antonio Lavalleja, a national hero of Uruguay. It connects Montevideo with Aceguá in the northeast.

The distance notation along Route 8 uses the same Kilometre Zero reference as Routes 1, 3, 6, 7, 8, 9 and IB, which is the Pillar of Peace of Plaza de Cagancha in Central Montevideo. The length of the road, from its beginning at Km. 13 to its end at Km. 455 is 442 kilometres (275 mi) in length.

== South end ==
Starting from Tres Cruces in Montevideo, Avenida 8 de Octubre runs in a northeast direction and turns into Camino Maldonado in Flor de Maroñas, at the junction with (and south end of) Route 7. Camino Maldonado continues in a northeast direction and turns into Route 8 in Punta de Rieles, 13 kilometres from Kilometre Zero.

== Destinations and junctions ==
These are the populated places Route 8 passes through, as well as its main junctions with other National Roads.

| Department | Location | km | Destinations | Notes |
|---|---|---|---|---|
| Montevideo Department | Punta de Rieles | 13 | — | Southern terminus |
| Montevideo Department | Villa García – Manga Rural | 17.5 | Route 102 | Southeast to Carrasco International Airport; west to Ángel S. Adami Airport |
| Canelones Department | | 29 | Route 101 | Southwest to Carrasco International Airport |
| Canelones Department | Pando | 31 | — | |
| Canelones Department | Empalme Olmos | 39 | Route 82; Route 34 | Route 82 northwest to Route 7; Route 34 south to Ruta Interbalnearia near Salinas |
| Canelones Department | | 46 | Route 11 | South to Atlántida; northwest to San José de Mayo |
| Canelones Department | | 66 | Route 9 | East to Pan de Azúcar, Rocha, and Chuy |
| Canelones Department | | 69 | Route 80 | North to Migues |
| Lavalleja Department | Solís de Mataojo | 80 | — | |
| Lavalleja Department | | 91 | Route 81 | West to Montes; east to Route 60 |
| Lavalleja Department | Parque Salus | 109.5 | — | |
| Lavalleja Department | | 116.5 | Route 12 | South to Route 9 and Punta Ballena |
| Lavalleja Department | Minas | 118 | — | |
| Lavalleja Department | Villa Serrana | 143 | — | |
| Lavalleja Department | | 150 | Route 13; Route 16 | Route 13 northeast to Aiguá; Route 16 near Laguna Negra |
| Lavalleja Department / Treinta y Tres Department | Mariscala | 181 | — | |
| Lavalleja Department / Treinta y Tres Department | Pirarajá | 215 | Route 58 | West to Route 40 |
| Lavalleja Department / Treinta y Tres Department | | 237 | Route 14 | Merges from the west; via Mercedes, Trinidad, Durazno, Sarandí del Yí, and Zapicán |
| Lavalleja Department / Treinta y Tres Department | José Pedro Varela | 254 | Route 14 | Route 14 splits east to Lascano and La Coronilla |
| Treinta y Tres Department | Treinta y Tres | 284–285 | Route 98; Route 17 | Route 98 northwest to Route 7; Route 17 east to La Charqueada |
| Cerro Largo Department | Melo | 395 | Route 7; Route 26 | Route 7 southeast; Route 26 west and northwest |
| Cerro Largo Department | Isidoro Noblía | 445 | — | |
| Cerro Largo Department | Aceguá | 455 | BR-153 (Brazil) | Northern terminus |
1.000 mi = 1.609 km; 1.000 km = 0.621 mi

== See also ==
- BR-153 (Brazil)
