= List of regions of Uruguay by Human Development Index =

Map of the Uruguayan departments by HDI in 2022. Caption: 0.800 – 1.000 0.700 – 0.799

This is a list of regions of Uruguay by Human Development Index as of 2023 with data for the year 2023.

Rank	Region	HDI (2023)
Very high human development
1	Montevideo	0.878
2	Costa Este (Canelones, Maldonado and Rocha)	0.863
–	Uruguay	0.862
3	Centro Sur (Flores, Florida and Lavalleja)	0.851
4	Centro (Durazno and Tacuarembó)	0.834
5	Norte (Artigas, Rivera, Cerro Largo and Treinta y Tres)	0.828
6	Litoral Sur (Soriano, Colonia and San José)	0.827
7	Litoral Norte (Paysandú, Salto and Río Negro)	0.820
