= Lemes =

Lemes may refer to:

- Lemes (surname)
- Lemeš (disambiguation)
