= José Pedro Varela, Uruguay =

José Pedro Varela
- City
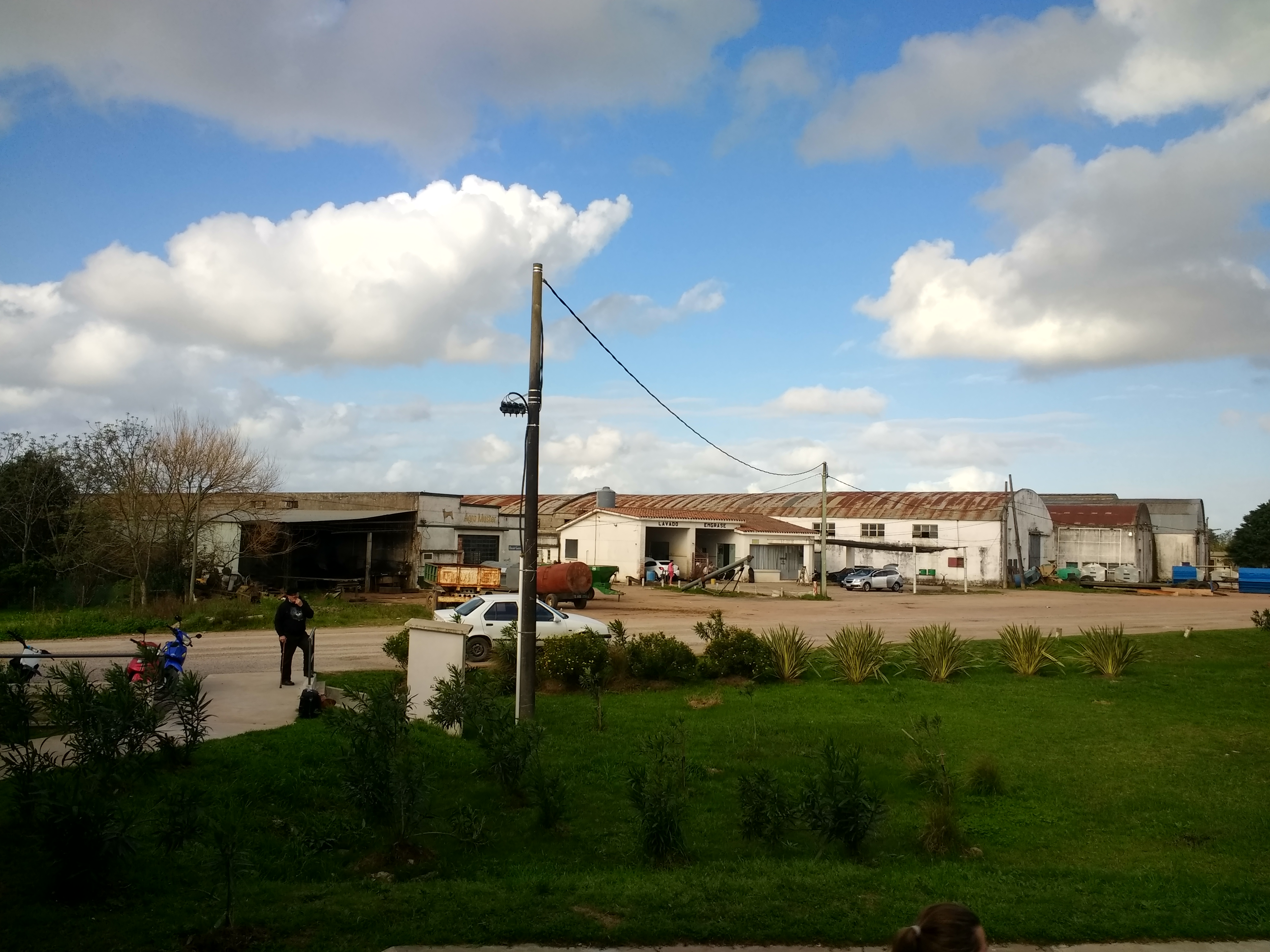

- Location in Uruguay
- Coordinates: 33°27′0″S 54°32′0″W
- Country: Uruguay
- Department: Lavalleja

Population (2011 Census)
  - Total: 5,118
- Time zone: UTC -3
- Postal code: 30300
- Dial plan: +598 4455 (+4 digits)

José Pedro Varela is a small city in the north of Lavalleja Department of southeastern Uruguay. It is named after the sociologist and politician José Pedro Varela.

== Geography ==
The city is located on Route 8 and the banks of Arroyo Corrales, which is the border with Treinta y Tres Department, about 27 kilometres (17 mi) south of the city of Treinta y Tres and 135 kilometres (84 mi) northeast of the department capital Minas.

== History ==
A populated centre was founded here on 24 August 1898. On 1 February 1918, its status was elevated to "Pueblo" (village) by decree Ley N° 5.639 and on 16 October 1958 to "Villa" (town) by decree N° 12.553 It received the status of "Ciudad" (city) on 19 November 1967 by decree Ley Nº 13.631.

== Population ==
In 2011, José Pedro Varela had a population of 5,118.

Year	Population
1908	1,200
1963	2,982
1975	3,543
1985	4,077
1996	4,983
2004	5,332
2011	5,118

Source: Instituto Nacional de Estadística de Uruguay

== Places of worship ==
- St. Charles Borromeo Parish Church (Roman Catholic)
