= Estadio Empleados del Comercio =

Sports Stadium in Uruguay

Estadio Empleados de Comercio
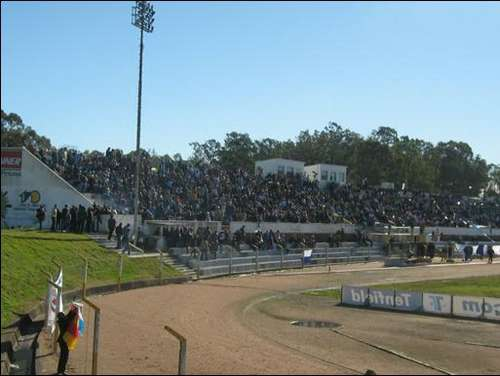
- Interactive map of Estadio Empleados de Comercio
- Full name: Estadio Centro Empleados de Comercio
- Location: Treinta y Tres, Uruguay
- Coordinates: 33.22105°S 54.37527°W
- Owner: Treinta y Tres Department
- Capacity: 6,000
- Surface: Field

Tenant
- Selección local de Treinta y Tres

Estadio Empleados del Comercio is a sports stadium in Treinta y Tres, Uruguay. It is currently used mostly for football matches. The stadium holds 6,000 people. It is the home stadium of the local team.
