= Cebollatí =

- Village
- Location in Uruguay
- Coordinates: 33°16′06″S 53°47′45″W
- Country: Uruguay
- Department: Rocha Department

Population (2011)
  - Total: 1,609
- Time zone: UTC -3
- Postal code: 27302
- Dial plan: +598 4459 (+4 digits)
- Climate: Cfa

Cebollatí is a village in the Rocha Department of eastern Uruguay. It is the northernmost settlement of the department.

== Geography ==
The village is located on Route 15 64 kilometres (40 mi) northeast of Lascano and on the south bank of Cebollatí River, about 14 kilometres (8.7 mi) west of Lake Merín in the middle-line of which is the Brazilian border. A secondary street of 7.5 kilometres (4.7 mi) joins it via a small cable ferry with General Enrique Martínez of Treinta y Tres Department.

== History ==
On 28 October 1919, it was declared a "Pueblo" (village) by decree Ley Nº 7.019.

== Population ==
In 2011 Cebollatí had a population of 1,609.

Year	Population
1908	3,049
1963	1,273
1975	1,459
1985	1,115
1996	1,490
2004	1,490
2011	1,609

Source: Instituto Nacional de Estadística de Uruguay
