= Miss Universo Uruguay 2009 =

Miss Universe qualifier competition in Uruguay

- Date: February 28, 2009
- Venue: Salón Montecarlo del Conrad Punta del Este Resort & Casino, Punta del Este, Uruguay
- Broadcaster: TV Ciudad
- Entrants: 15
- Placements: 8
- Winner: Cintia D'Ottone; Colonia
- Congeniality: Valentina FernándezSan José
- Photogenic: Rosario Cabrera; Paysandú

The Miss Universo Uruguay 2009 was held on February 28, 2009. The winner represented Uruguay at Miss Universe 2009 and Miss World 2009. The Best Departemental Costume was used in Miss Universe.

== Results ==
=== Placements ===
Placement	Contestant
Miss Universo Uruguay 2009	Colonia – Cintia D'Ottone
1st Runner Up	Tacuarembó – Karen Gutiérrez
2nd Runner Up	Treinta y Tres – Nadia Teodulos
3rd Runner Up	Paysandú – Rocío Torres
Top 8	Canelones – Patricia Callero; Paysandú – Rosario Cabrera; Distrito Capital – Sofia Scarenzio; San José Valentina Fernández

=== Special awards ===
- Miss Photogenic (voted by press reporters) - Rosario Cabrera (Paysandú)
- Miss Congeniality (voted by Miss Universo Uruguay contestants) - Valentina Fernández (San José)
- Miss Internet - Nadia Teodulos (Treinta y Tres)
- Best Look - Nadia Teodulos (Treinta y Tres)
- Best Face - Nadia Teodulos (Treinta y Tres)
- Best Departemental Costume - Patricia Callero (Canelones)

== Delegates ==
- Artigas - Johana Rivas
- Canelones - Patricia Callero
- Colonia - Cintia D'Ottone
- Distrito Capital - Sofia Scarenzio
- Durazno - Isabela Sparapaglione
- Maldonado - Ana Laura Santana
- Montevideo - Sabrina Martinez
- Paysandú - Rosario Cabrera
- Río Negro - Sofia Alberti
- Rivera - Andrea de Armas
- Salto - Silvana Giordano
- San José - Valentina Fernández
- Soriano - Rocío Torres
- Tacuarembó - Karen Gutiérrez
- Treinta y Tres - Nadia Teodulos
