= Isidoro Noblía =

- Town
- Location in Uruguay
- Coordinates: 31°58′0″S 54°7′0″W
- Country: Uruguay
- Department: Cerro Largo Department

Population (2011)
  - Total: 2,331
- Time zone: UTC -3
- Postal code: 37002
- Dial plan: +598 46 (+6 digits)

Isidoro Noblía is a small town (villa) in the Cerro Largo Department of eastern Uruguay.

== Geography ==
=== Location ===
It is located on Route 8, 12 kilometres (7.5 mi) south of Aceguá on the border with Brazil and 45 kilometres (28 mi) north of the city of Melo.

== History ==
Its status was elevated to "Pueblo" (village) on 15 November 1963 by the Act of Ley Nº 13.167 and then to "Villa" (town) on 20 October 1992 by the Act of Ley Nº 16.312

== Population ==
In 2011 Isidoro Noblía had a population of 2,331.

Year	Population
1963	865
1975	1,228
1985	1,548
1996	1,964
2004	2,462
2011	2,331

Source: Instituto Nacional de Estadística de Uruguay
