= Aceguá =

Aceguá is a divided town in two countries:

- Aceguá, Brazil
- Aceguá, Uruguay
