= Pirarajá =

- Village
- Location in Uruguay
- Coordinates: 33°44′25″S 54°45′30″W
- Country: Uruguay
- Department: Lavalleja Department

Population (2011)
  - Total: 713
- Time zone: UTC -3
- Postal code: 30002
- Dial plan: +598 4448 (+4 digits)

Pirarajá is a village in the Lavalleja Department of southeastern Uruguay.

== Geography ==
It is located on Route 8 and on its junction with Route 58, about 34 kilometres (21 mi) north of Mariscala and 95 kilometres (59 mi) northeast of Minas.

== History ==
Its status was elevated to "Pueblo" (village) on 22 December 1906 by decree Ley Nº 3.136.

== Population ==
In 2011 Pirarajá had a population of 713.

| Year | Population |
|---|---|
| 1963 | 914 |
| 1975 | 910 |
| 1985 | 773 |
| 1996 | 737 |
| 2004 | 967 |
| 2011 | 713 |

Source: Instituto Nacional de Estadística de Uruguay
