= José Batlle y Ordóñez, Uruguay =

José Batlle y Ordóñez
- Town
- Location in Uruguay
- Coordinates: 33°28′0″S 55°9′0″W
- Country: Uruguay
- Department: Lavalleja Department
- Founded: 1883

Population (2011)
  - Total: 2,203
- Time zone: UTC -3
- Postal code: 30200
- Dial plan: +598 4469 (+4 digits)

José Batlle y Ordóñez is a small town in the northwest of Lavalleja Department in Uruguay.

== Geography ==
Local branch of the Banco de la República Oriental del Uruguay

The town is located on the junction of Route 7 with Route 14, about 24 kilometres (15 mi) west of Zapicán and on the border of Florida Department. It is in close proximity to Nico Pérez, separated from it partly by Route 7 and partly by the railroad tracks. The two parts are joined by a bridge passing over the tracks.

== History ==
A populated centre was founded here on 9 December 1883. The initial (common) village was named "Nico Pérez" and recognized as such by decree of 10 April 1896. On 19 March 1907 it was renamed to "José Batlle y Ordóñez" by decree Ley Nº 3.148. The part of the village that is in the Florida Department kept the original name.

== Population ==
In 2011 José Batlle y Ordóñez had a population of 2,203.

Year	Population
1908	5,968
1963	2,738
1975	2,074
1985	2,448
1996	2,298
2004	2,424
2011	2,203

Source: Instituto Nacional de Estadística de Uruguay

== Places of worship ==
- St. Nicholas of Bari Parish Church (Roman Catholic)
