= Estación Rincón =

- Village
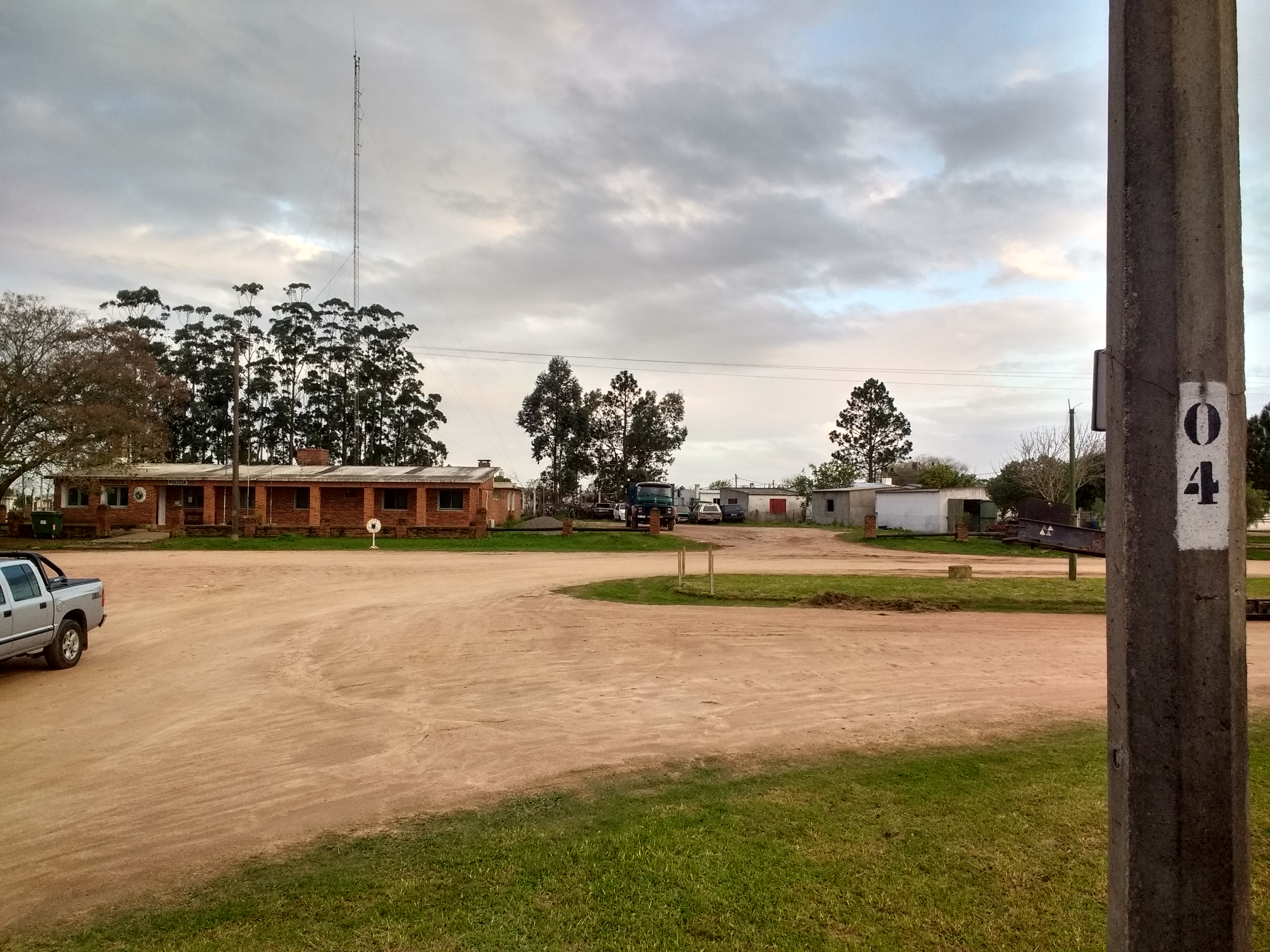

- Location in Uruguay
- Coordinates: 32°49′55″S 53°49′43″W
- Country: Uruguay
- Department: Treinta y Tres Department

Population (2011)
  - Total: 674
- Time zone: UTC -3
- Postal code: 33002
- Dial plan: +598 4458 (+4 digits)

Estación Rincón or Rincón is a village in the Treinta y Tres Department of Uruguay.

== Geography ==
The main part of the town is located between Ruta 18 and the railroad tracks, where there is the station which gives its name to the town. A smaller part is located southeast of the tracks. It is the main town of Costas del Tacuarí, one of the main rice producing areas of Uruguay. The closest town is Vergara, which is located 17 kilometres (11 mi) to the southwest.

== History ==
On 9 December 1985, its status was elevated to "Pueblo" (village) by the Act of Ley Nº 15.788.

== Population ==
In 2011 Estación Rincón had a population of 674.

Year	Population
1963	233
1975	147
1985	375
1996	734
2004	742
2011	674

Source: Instituto Nacional de Estadística de Uruguay
