= Nico Pérez =

- Village
- Location in Uruguay
- Coordinates: 33°28′58″S 55°9′14″W
- Country: Uruguay
- Department: Florida Department

Population (2011)
  - Total: 1,030
- Time zone: UTC -3
- Postal code: 30200
- Dial plan: +598 4469 (+4 digits)

Nico Pérez is a village in the Florida Department of central Uruguay. It is located on the border of the Lavalleja Department.

== Geography ==
It is near José Batlle y Ordoñez. They are separated partly by Ruta 7 and partly by the railroad tracks. The two parts are joined by a bridge passing over the tracks.

== History ==
The initial common village here was named "Nico Pérez" and recognized as such by decree of 10 April 1896. On 19 March 1907 it was renamed to "José Batlle y Ordóñez" by the Act of Ley Nº 3.148, at the time head of the judicial section "Monzón". The part of the village that is in the Florida Department, however, kept its original name and its status was elevated to "Pueblo" by the Act of Ley Nº 12.232 on 14 October 1955.

== Population ==
In 2011 Nico Pérez had a population of 1,030.

Year	Population
1908	1,149
1963	743
1975	958
1985	580
1996	890
2004	1,049
2011	1,030

Source: Instituto Nacional de Estadística de Uruguay
