= Lemes (surname) =

Lemes is a surname. Notable people with the surname include:

- Bernardo Lemes (born 2002), Brazilian footballer
- Caíque Venâncio Lemes (born 1993), Brazilian footballer
- Gonzalo Lemes (born 1980), Uruguayan footballer
- Manoel Cristiano Ribeiro Lemes (born 1989), Brazilian footballer
