= Ejido de Treinta y Tres =

- Populated rural area
- Location in Uruguay
- Coordinates: 33°13′0″S 54°22′0″W
- Country: Uruguay
- Department: Treinta y Tres Department

Population (2011)
  - Total: 6,782
- Time zone: UTC -3
- Postal code: 33000
- Dial plan: +598 445 (+5 digits)

Ejido de Treinta y Tres is a populated rural area in the Treinta y Tres Department of eastern Uruguay. It is a less densely inhabited extension of the city of Treinta y Tres, sharing borders with it to its west, north and east.

== Population ==
In 2011 Ejido de Treinta y Tres had a population of 6,782.

Year	Population
1975	2,571
1985	2,995
1996	4,402
2004	6,115
2011	6,782

Source: Instituto Nacional de Estadística de Uruguay
