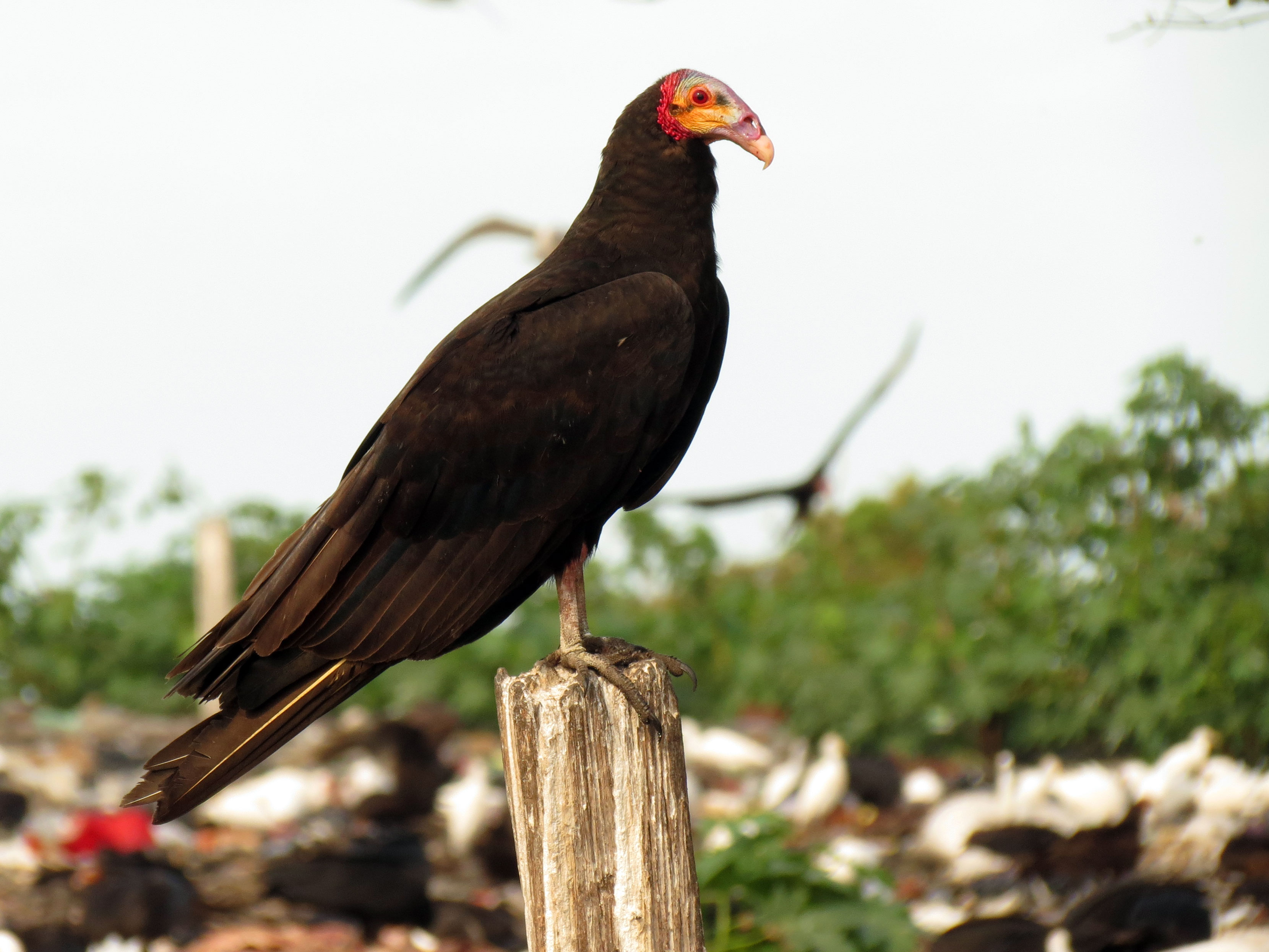
- In Yucatán, Mexico

Conservation status
- Least Concern (IUCN 3.1)

Scientific classification
- Kingdom: Animalia
- Phylum: Chordata
- Class: Aves
- Order: Accipitriformes
- Family: Cathartidae
- Genus: Cathartes
- Species: C. burrovianus

Binomial name
- Cathartes burrovianus Cassin, 1845
- Breeding range of C. burrovianus

= Lesser yellow-headed vulture =

Species of bird

The lesser yellow-headed vulture (Cathartes burrovianus), also known as the savannah vulture, is a species of bird in the New World vulture family Cathartidae. It was considered to be the same species as the greater yellow-headed vulture until they were split in 1964. It is found in Mexico, Central America, and South America in seasonally wet or flooded lowland grassland, swamps, and heavily degraded former forest. It is a large bird, with a wingspan of 150–165 cm (59–65 in). The body plumage is black, and the head and neck, which are featherless, are pale orange with red or blue areas. It lacks a syrinx, so therefore its vocalizations are limited to grunts or low hisses.

The lesser yellow-headed vulture feeds on carrion and locates carcasses by sight and by smell, an ability which is rare in birds. It is dependent on larger vultures, such as the king vulture, to open the hides of larger animal carcasses as its bill is not strong enough to do this. Like other New World vultures, the lesser yellow-headed vulture utilizes thermals to stay aloft with minimal effort. It lays its eggs on flat surfaces, such as the floors of caves, or in the hollows of stumps. It feeds its young by regurgitation.

== Taxonomy ==
The lesser yellow-headed vulture was first described in 1845 by John Cassin.

The exact taxonomic placement of the lesser yellow-headed vulture and the remaining six species of New World vultures remains unclear. Although both are similar in appearance and have similar ecological roles, the New World and Old World vultures evolved from different ancestors in different parts of the world. Just how different the two are is currently under debate, with some earlier authorities suggesting that the New World vultures are more closely related to storks. More recent authorities maintain their overall position in the order Falconiformes along with the Old World vultures or place them in their own order, Cathartiformes. The South American Classification Committee has removed the New World vultures from Ciconiiformes and instead placed them in Incertae sedis, but notes that a move to Falconiformes or Cathartiformes is possible. Like other New World vultures, the lesser yellow-headed vulture has a diploid chromosome number of 80.

=== Subspecies ===
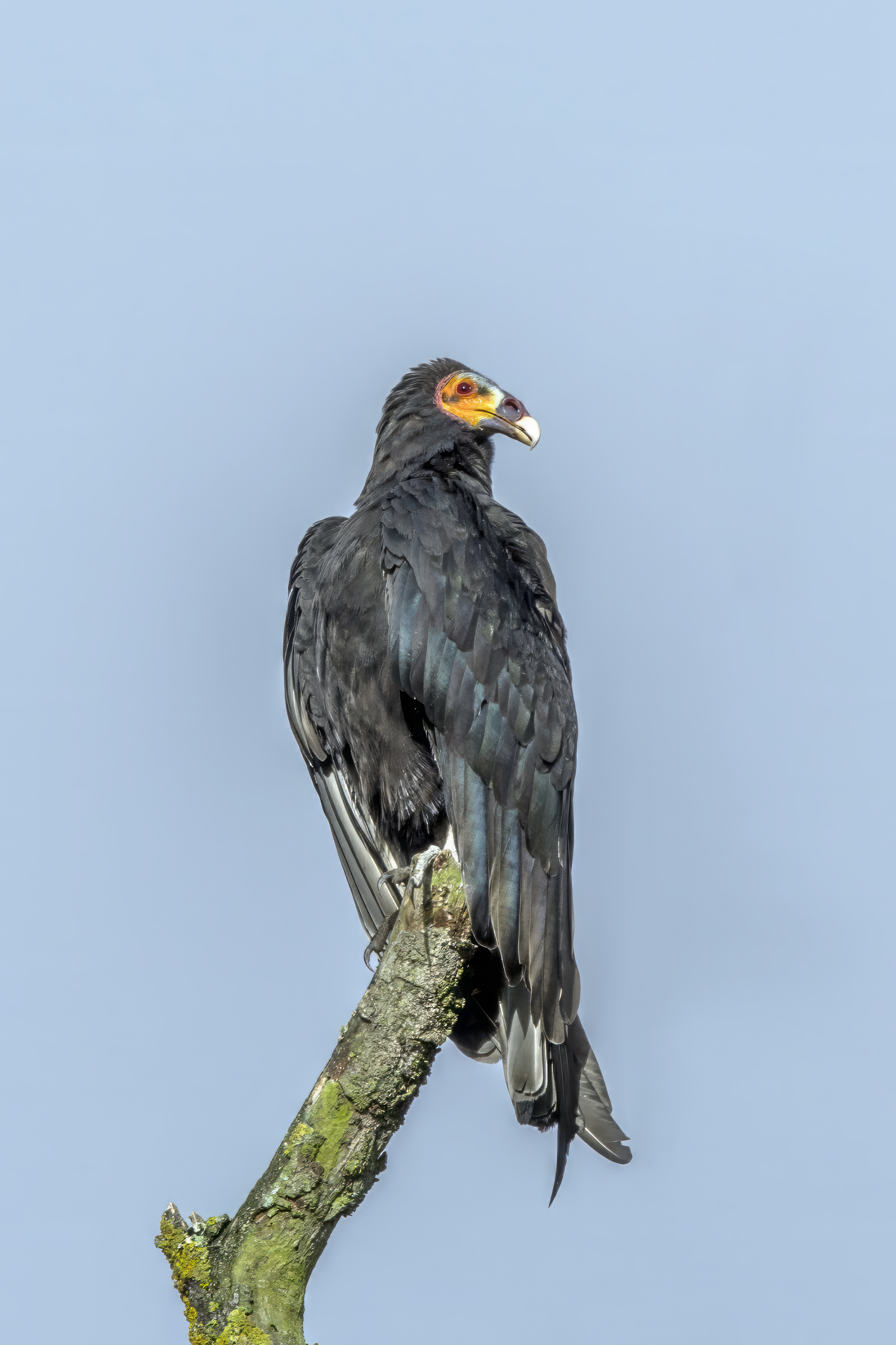
C. b. burrovianus, Colombia

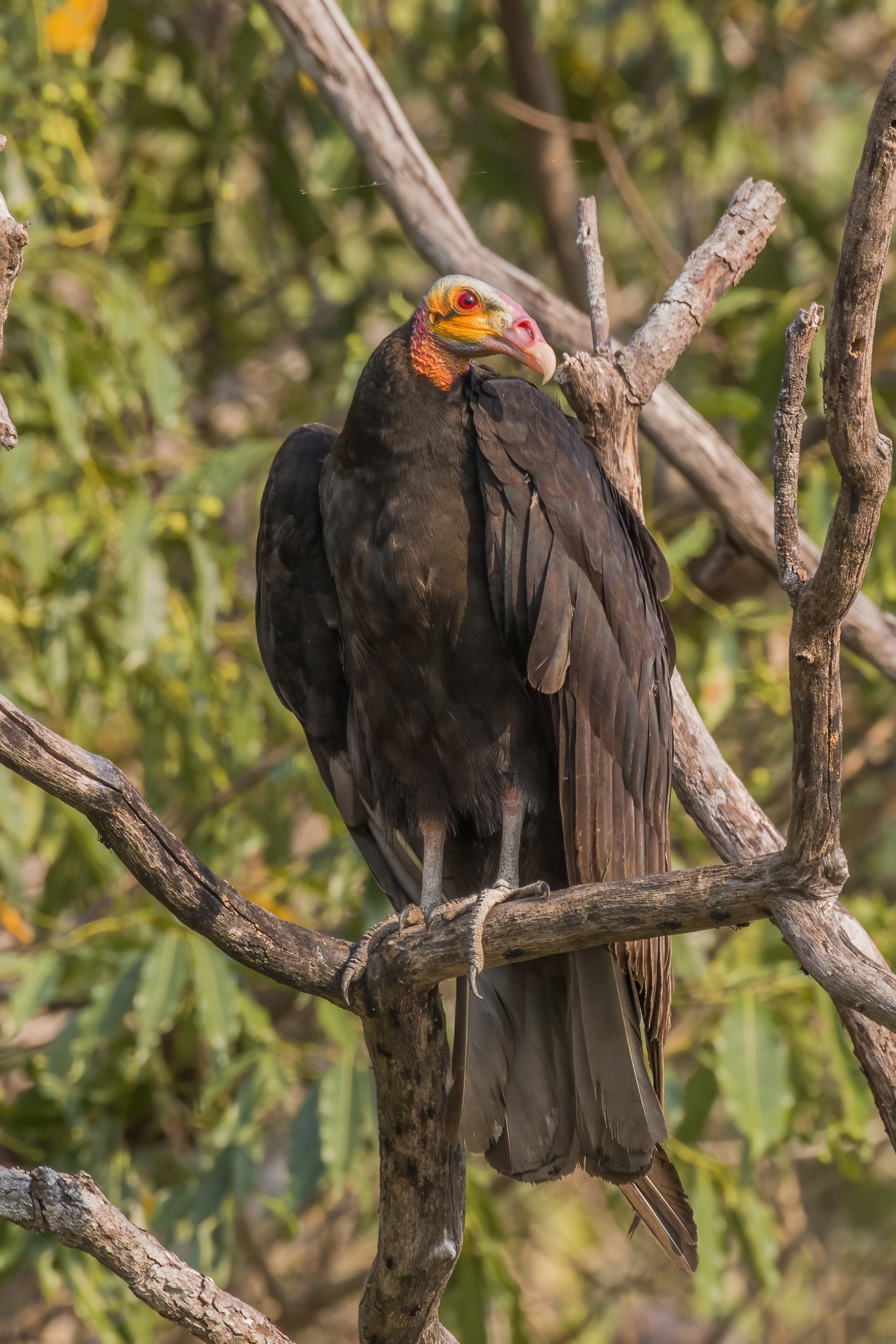
C. b. urubtinga, in the Pantanal, Brazil

It is sometimes recognized as having two subspecies. The first, Cathartes burrovianus urubitinga, described by Austrian ornithologist August von Pelzeln in 1851, is the larger of the two and is found from Argentina north to Colombia, while the nominate subspecies, Cathartes burrovianus burrovianus, is smaller and found from northwestern South America through Central America to Mexico.

=== Etymology ===
The lesser yellow-headed vulture's genus, Cathartes, means "purifier" and is from the Latinized form of the Greek kathartēs/καθαρτης. The common name, vulture, is derived from the Latin word vulturus, which means "tearer" and is a reference to its feeding habits.

== Distribution and habitat ==
It is found in Argentina, Belize, Bolivia, Brazil, Chile, Colombia, Costa Rica, Ecuador, El Salvador, French Guiana, Guatemala, Guyana, Honduras, Mexico, Nicaragua, Panama, Paraguay, Peru, Suriname, Uruguay, and Venezuela. Its natural habitats are subtropical or tropical seasonally wet or flooded lowland grassland, swamps, mangroves, and heavily degraded former forest. It may wander over dry fields and clearings. It is not generally found in high-altitude regions.

This bird with its somehow crow-like aspect gave foot to the naming of the Quebrada de los Cuervos (Crows Ravine) in Uruguay, where they dwell together with the black vulture and the turkey vulture.

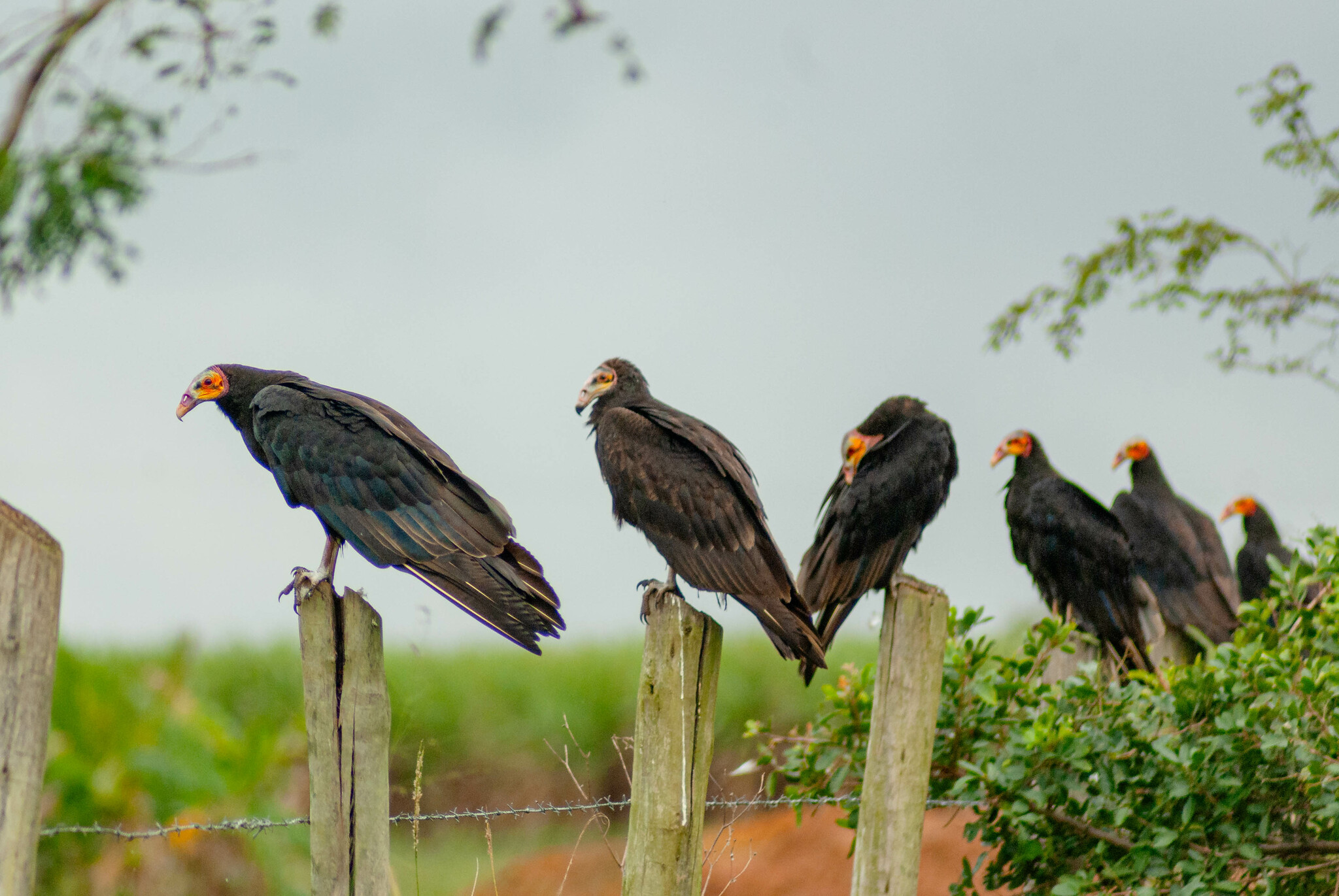
Flock, in Rio de Janeiro, Brasil

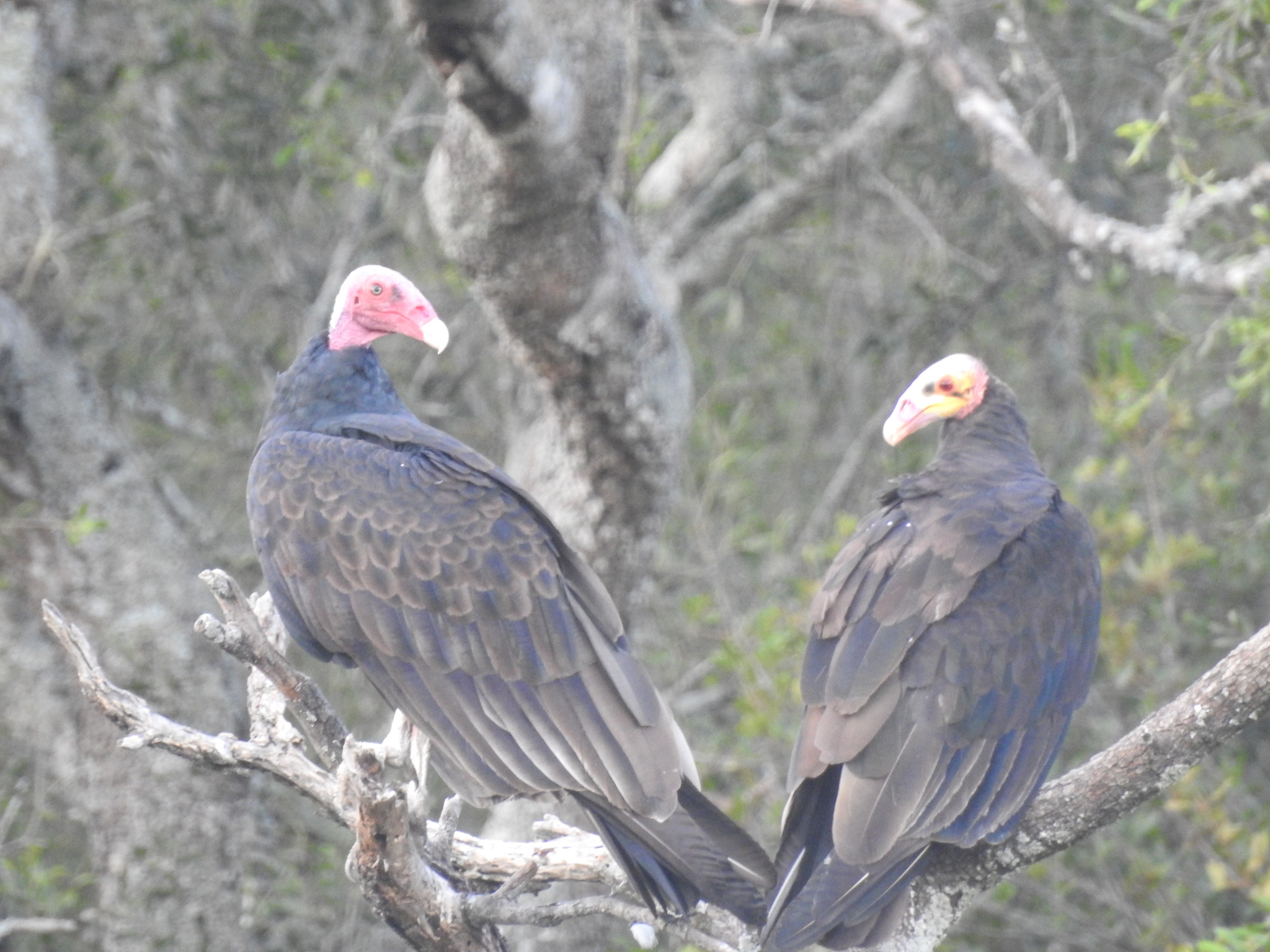
With a turkey vulture, in Formosa, Argentina

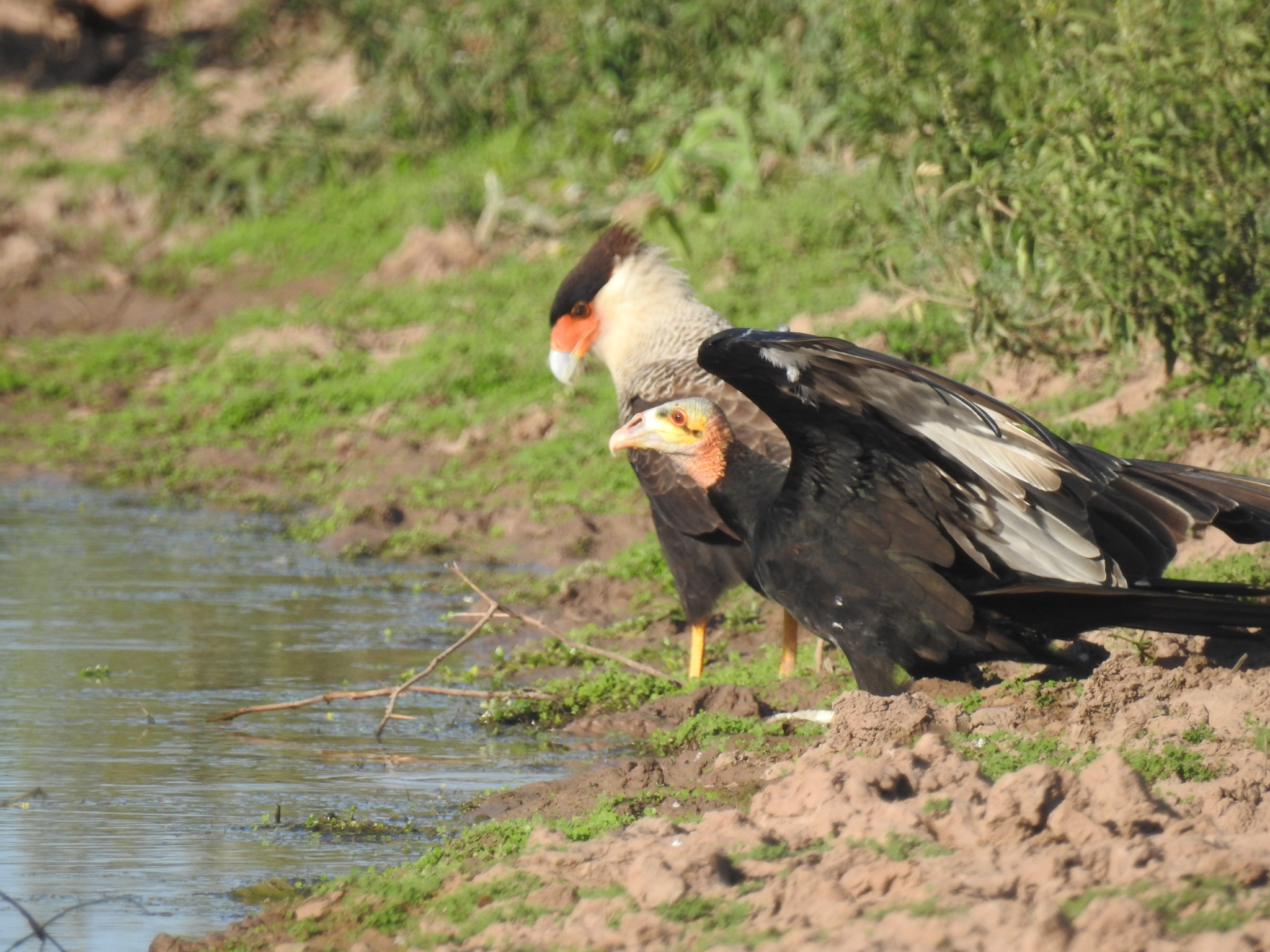
With a crested caracara, in Formosa, Argentina

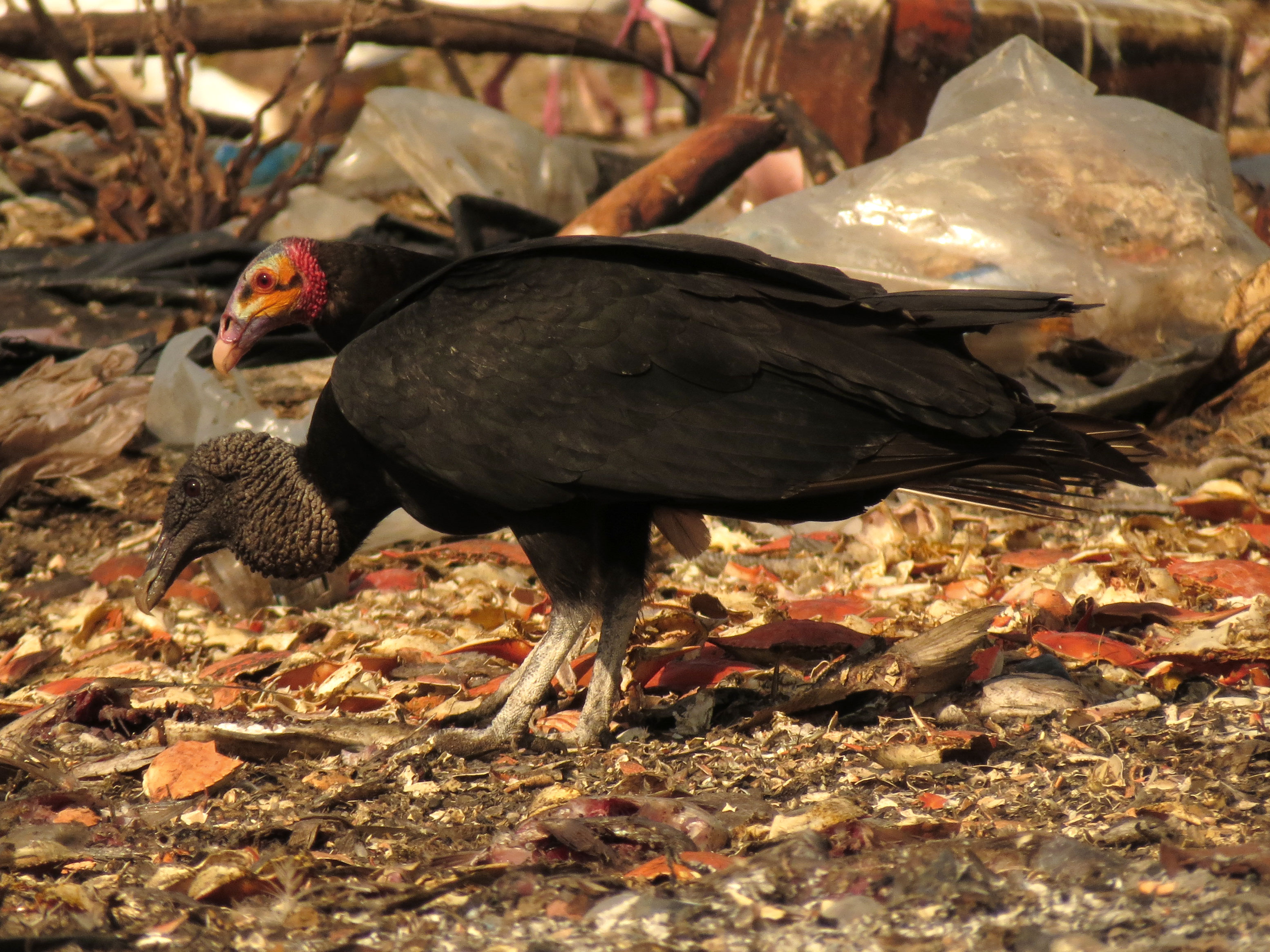
With a black vulture, Yucatán, Mexico

== Description ==
This is the lightest and smallest of the extant New World vultures despite sometimes measuring at least as long and longer winged than black vultures. The lesser yellow-headed vulture is 53–66 cm (21–26 in) in length, with a wingspan of 150–165 cm (59–65 in) and a tail length of 19–24 cm (7.5–9.4 in). Its weight ranges from 0.95 to 1.55 kg (2.1 to 3.4 lb). Its plumage is black with a green sheen. The throat and the sides of the head are featherless. The head and neck are bare of feathers, and the skin is yellow, with a reddish forehead and nape and a gray-blue crown. The irises of its eyes are red, its legs are white, and its beak is flesh-colored. The eye has a single incomplete row of eyelashes on the upper lid and two rows on the lower lid. The tail is rounded and relatively short for a vulture; the tip of the closed wing extends beyond the tail. Immature lesser yellow-headed vultures have browner plumage, a dusky head, and a white nape.

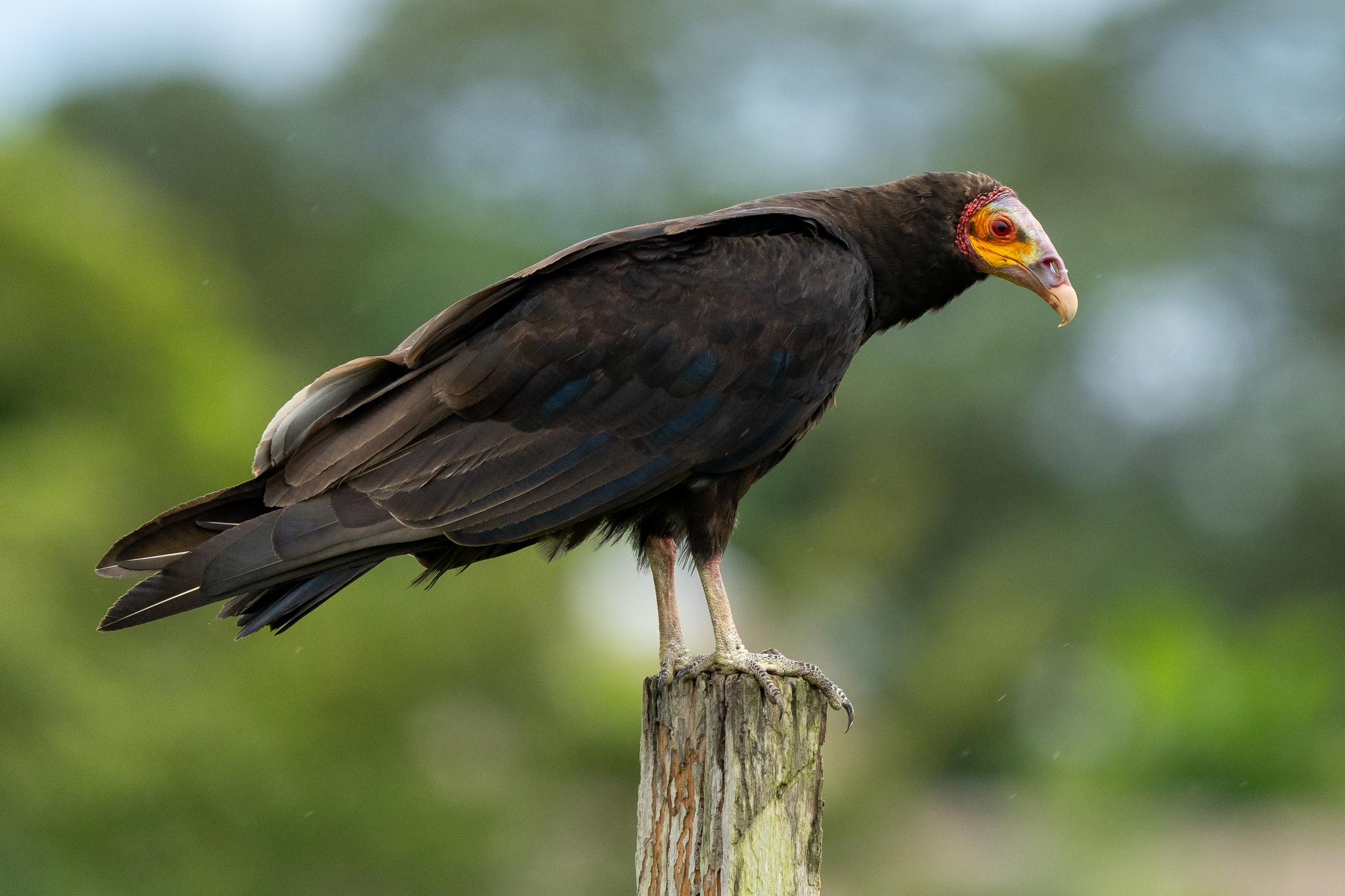
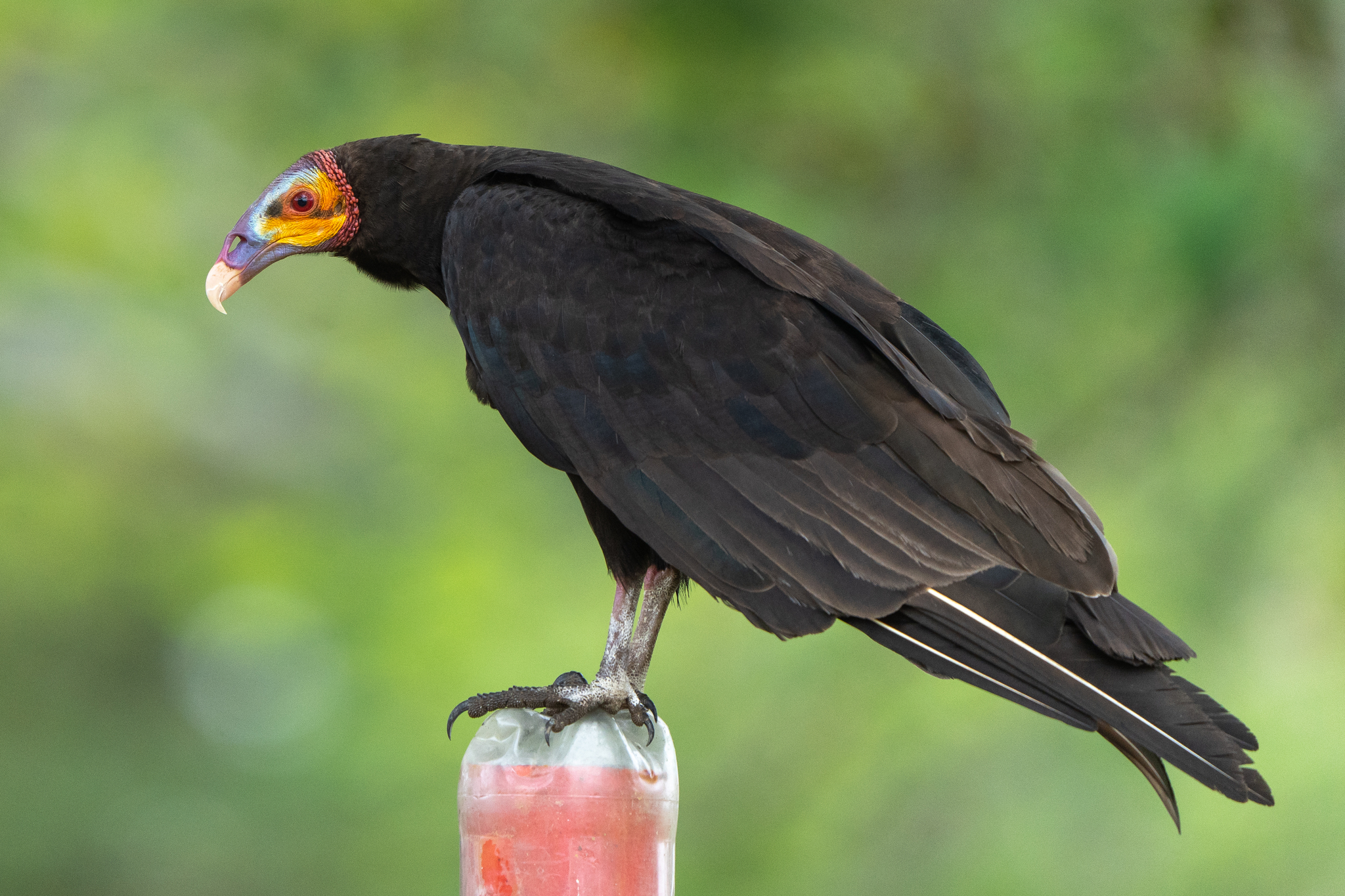
Yellow-headed vultures in Panama

The beak is thick, rounded, and hooked at the tip. The front toes are long with small webs at their bases and are not adapted to grasping. The opening of the nostril is longitudinal, and the nostrils lack a septum. Like all New World vultures, the lesser yellow-headed vulture lacks a syrinx, and is therefore unable to make any sound other than a low hiss.

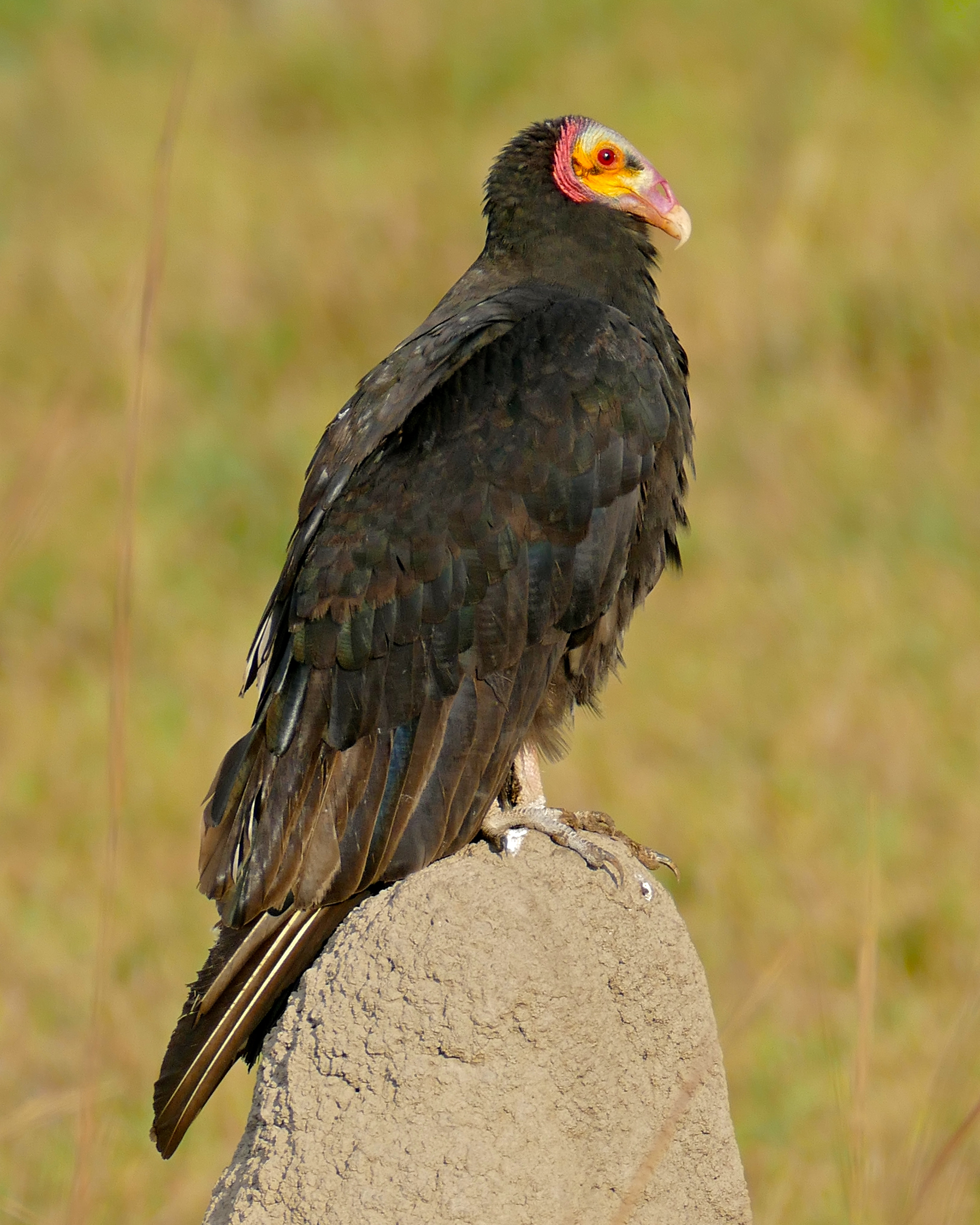
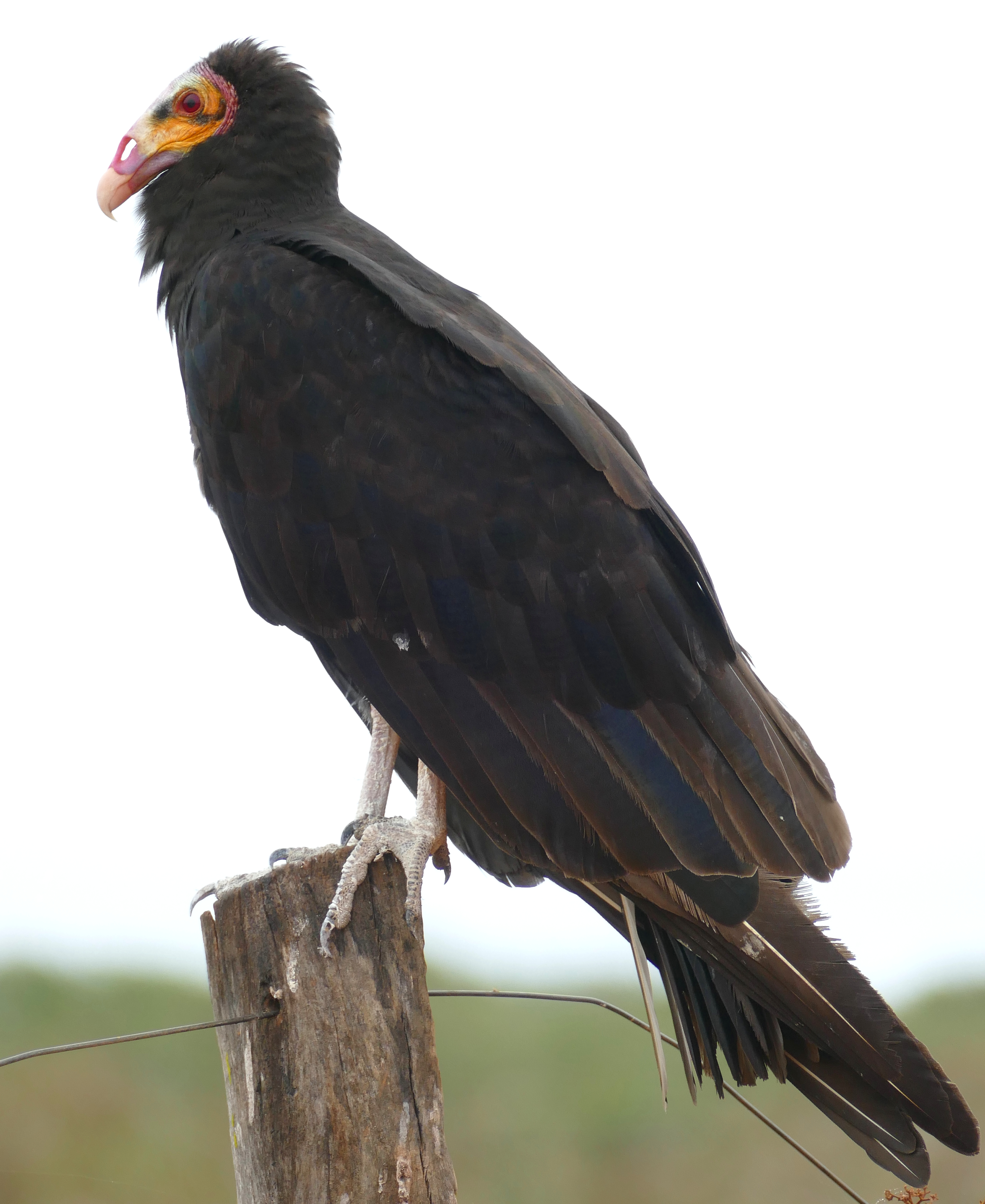
In Mato Grosso, Brazil

It differs in appearance from the similar greater yellow-headed vulture in several ways. It is smaller and is less heavily built than the greater yellow-headed vulture and has a shorter, thinner tail. The plumage is browner than the greater yellow-headed vulture's dark, glossy black plumage. Its legs are lighter in color, and its head is more orange-tinged than the more yellow head of the greater yellow-headed vulture. Its flight is also less steady than that of the greater yellow-headed vulture. The lesser yellow-headed vulture also prefers to live in savannas, as opposed to the preferred forest habitat of the greater yellow-headed vulture.

Besides the greater yellow-headed vulture, it is similar to the turkey vulture.

== Ecology and behavior ==
The lesser yellow-headed vulture flies solitarily, with wings held in a dihedral position. It glides at a low altitude over wetlands while locating food, and perches on fence posts or on other low perches. When flying, it travels alone and is rarely found in groups. The flight of the lesser yellow-headed is an example of static soaring flight, which uses thermals to maintain altitude without the need to flap its wings. This vulture rarely soars high in the air, preferring low altitudes. This bird is believed to be somewhat migratory in response to the changes in water level where it lives.

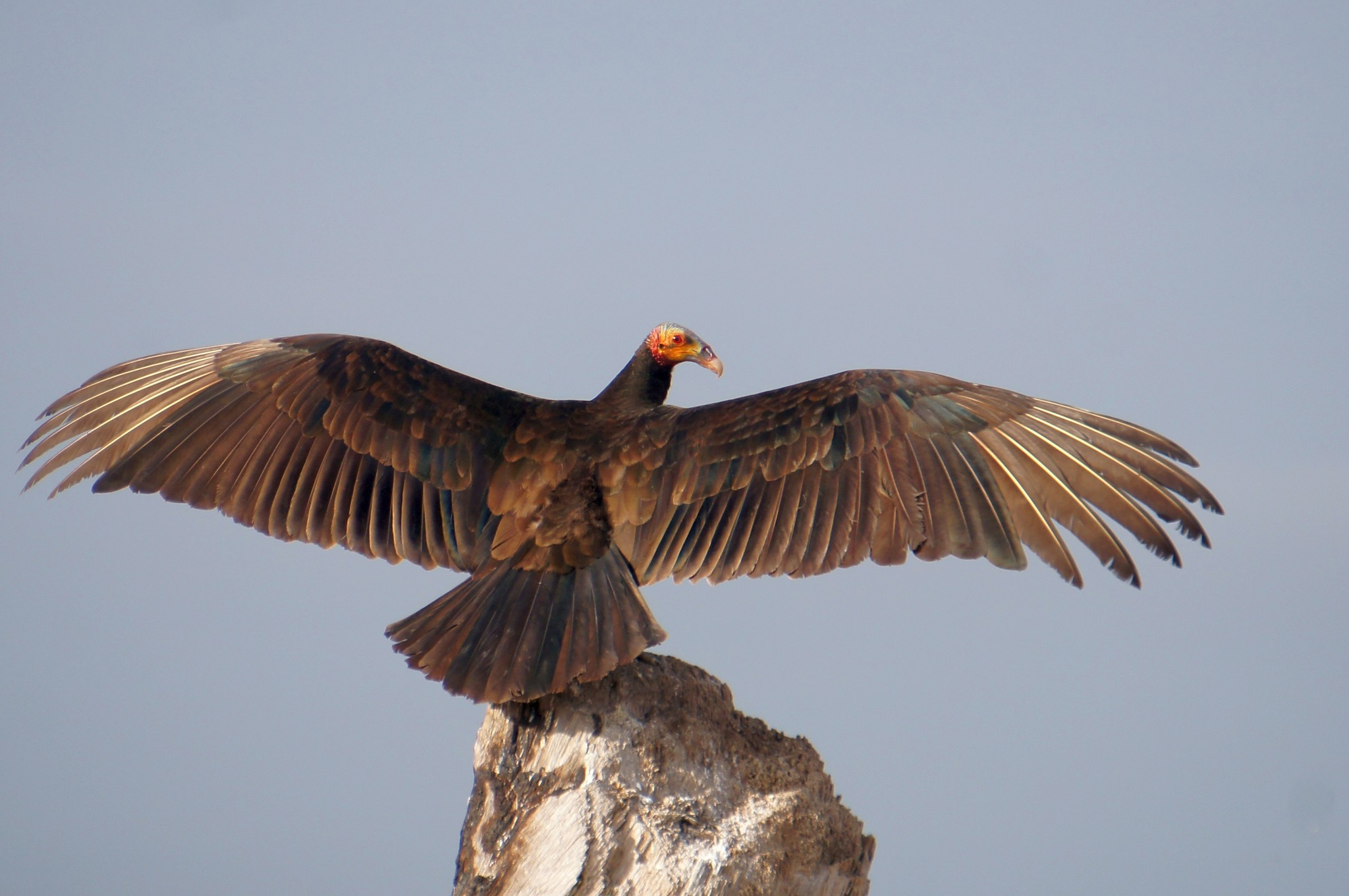
Dorsal view of wings, in Veracruz, Mexico

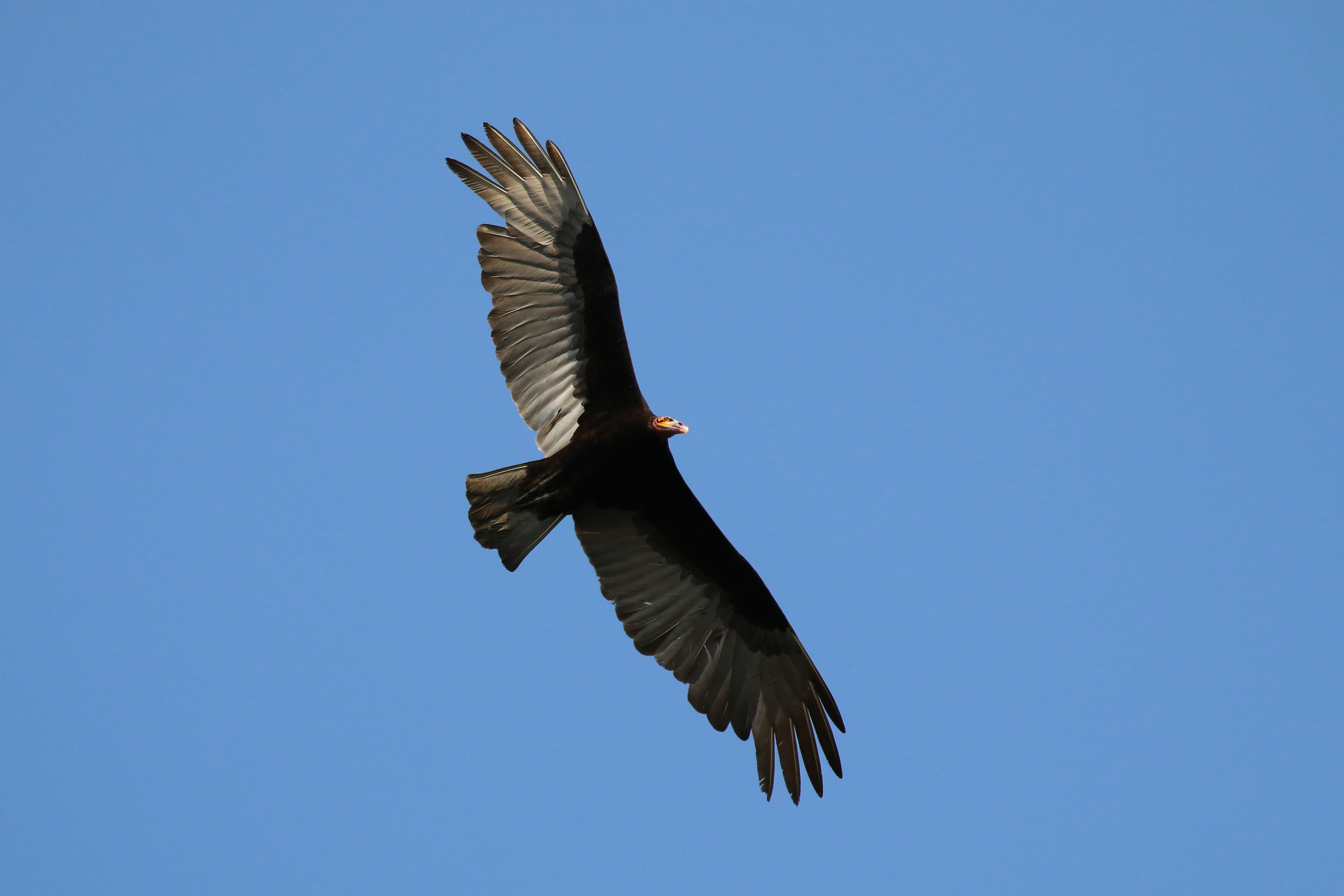
Ventral view of wings, in the Pantanal, Brazil

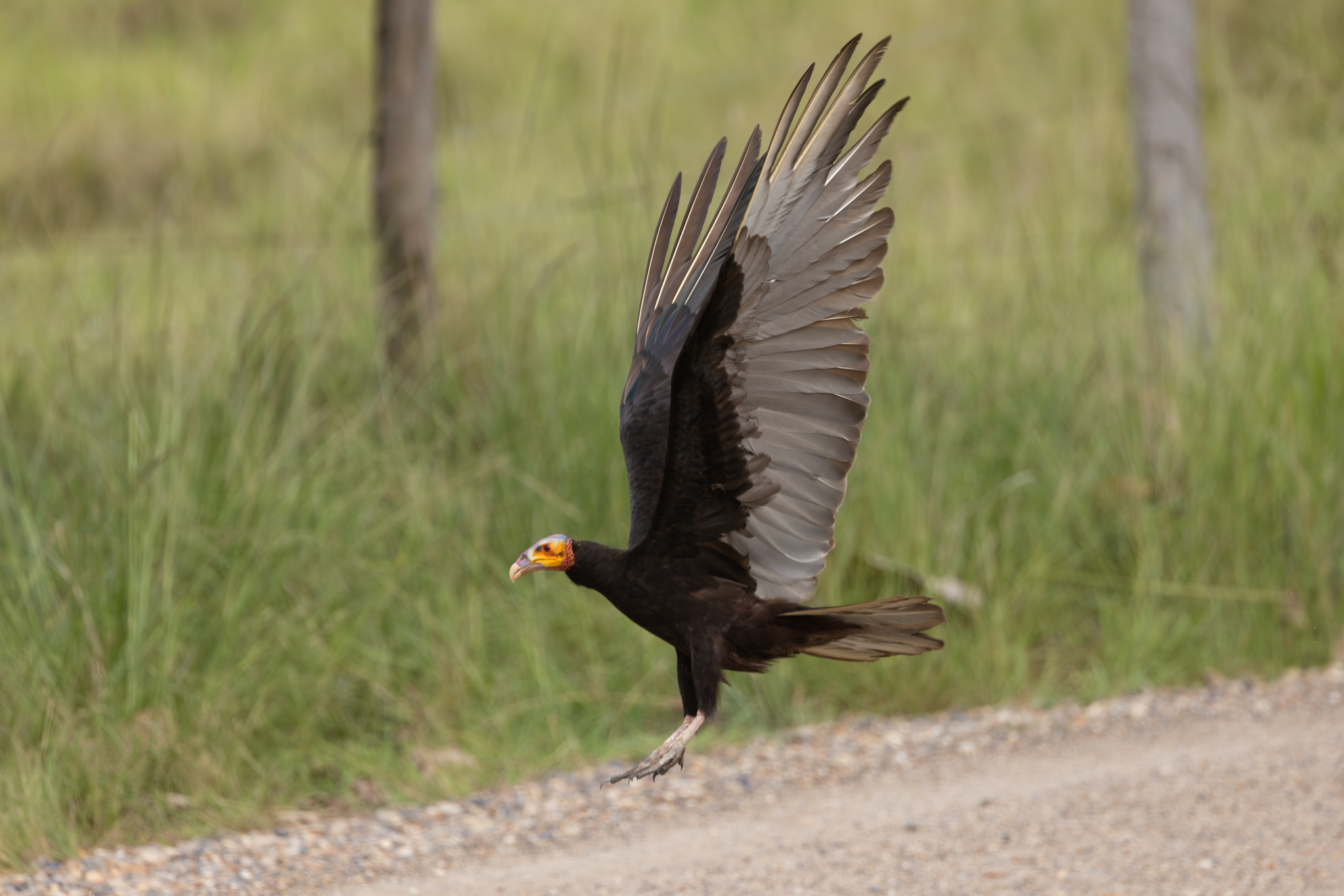
In Colombia

The lesser yellow-headed vulture, like other New World vultures, has the unusual habit of urohidrosis, in which it urinates or defecates on its legs to cool them by evaporation.

=== Breeding ===
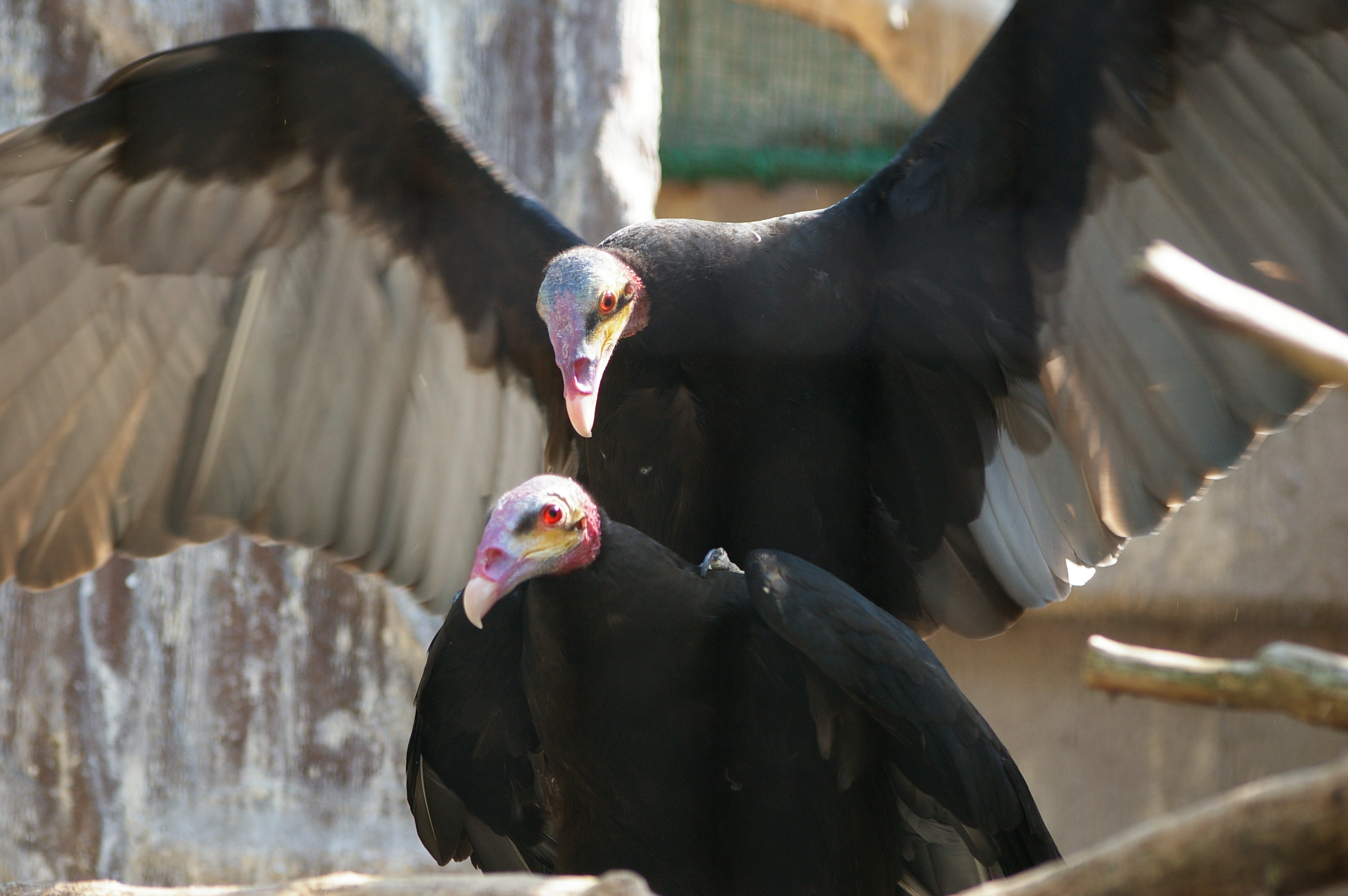
At the Tennoji Zoo, Japan

Lesser yellow-headed vultures do not build nests, but rather lay eggs on the ground, cliff ledges, the floors of caves, or in the hollow of a tree. Eggs are cream colored and heavily blotched with brown and gray spots, particularly around the larger end. Two eggs are generally laid. The chicks are altricial—they are blind, naked and relatively immobile upon hatching. The chicks do not grow their down feathers until later. The parents feed their young by regurgitating pre-digested food into their beak, where the chicks then drink it. The young fledge after two to three months.

=== Feeding ===
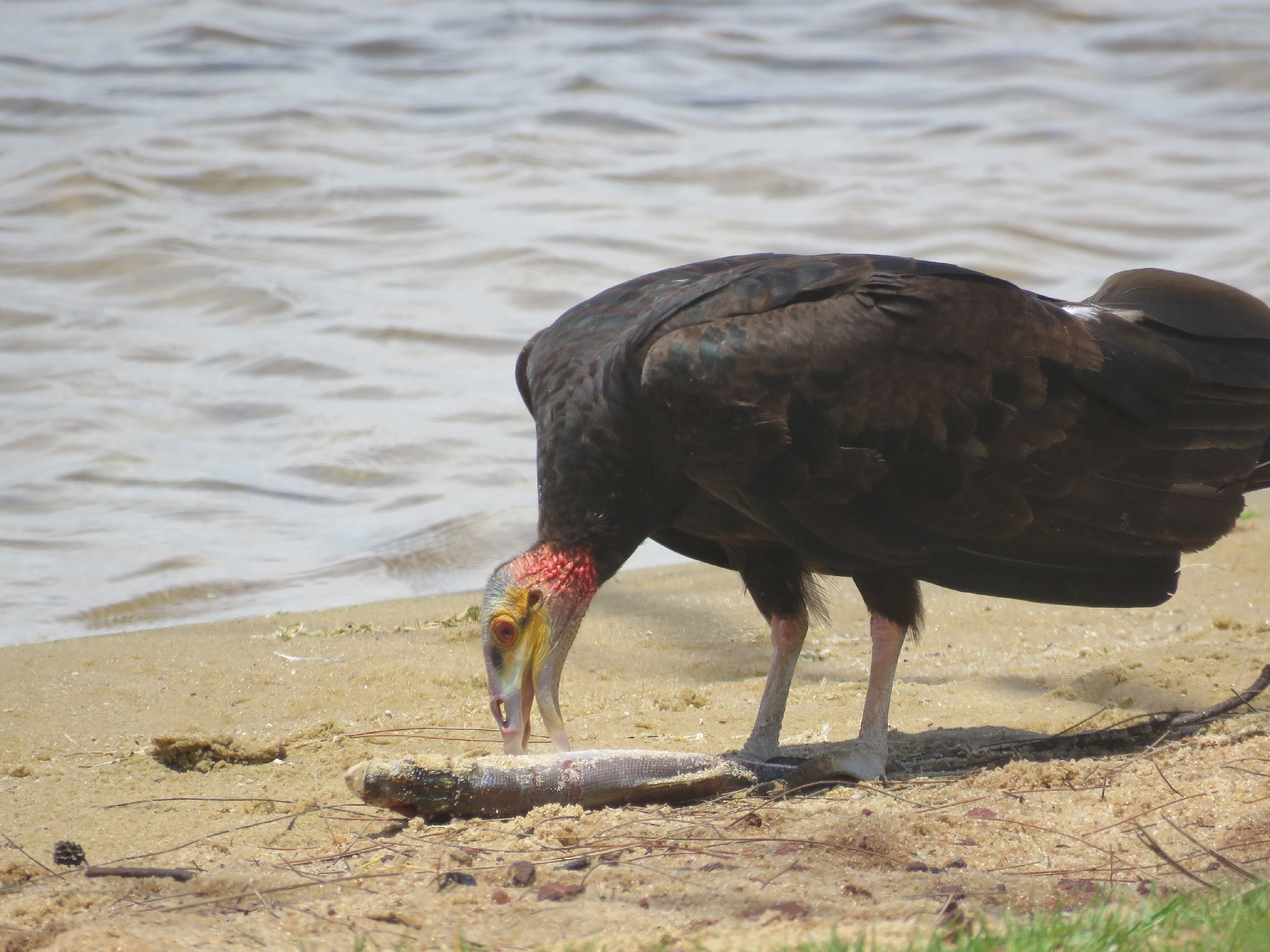
Eating fish, in Rio de Janeiro, Brazil

The lesser yellow-headed vulture is a scavenger and subsists almost entirely on carrion. It will eat roadkill or the carcass of any animal, but is also known to hunt for food, especially small aquatic animals in marshes. It is not usually attracted to larger carcasses and may swallow live invertebrates and larvae, possibly also frogs, as much as smaller items of carrion. Carrion records include smallish mammals, snakes and other reptiles and, especially, rotting fish. It prefers fresh meat, but often cannot make the first cut into the carcass of a larger animal because its beak is not strong enough to tear into the tough hide. The lesser yellow-headed vulture will no longer feed on a piece of carrion once the meat is in a state of extreme decay, as it becomes contaminated with microbial toxins. Like other vultures, it plays an important role in its ecosystem by disposing of carrion which would otherwise be a breeding ground for disease.

The lesser yellow-headed vulture forages using its keen eyesight to locate carrion on the ground, but also uses its sense of smell, an ability which is uncommon in the avian world. It locates carrion by detecting the scent of ethyl mercaptan, a gas produced by the beginnings of decay in dead animals. The olfactory lobe of its brain responsible for processing smells is particularly large compared to other animals. This characteristic of New World vultures has been used by humans: ethyl mercaptan is injected into pipelines, and engineers looking for leaks then follow the foraging vultures.

King vultures, which lack the ability to smell carrion, follow the lesser yellow-headed vultures to carcasses, where the king vulture tears open the skin of the dead animal. This allows the smaller lesser yellow-headed vulture access to food, as it does not have a bill strong enough to tear the hide of larger animals. This is an example of mutual dependence between species. It is generally displaced from carcasses by both turkey vultures and king vultures, due to their larger size.

== Conservation ==
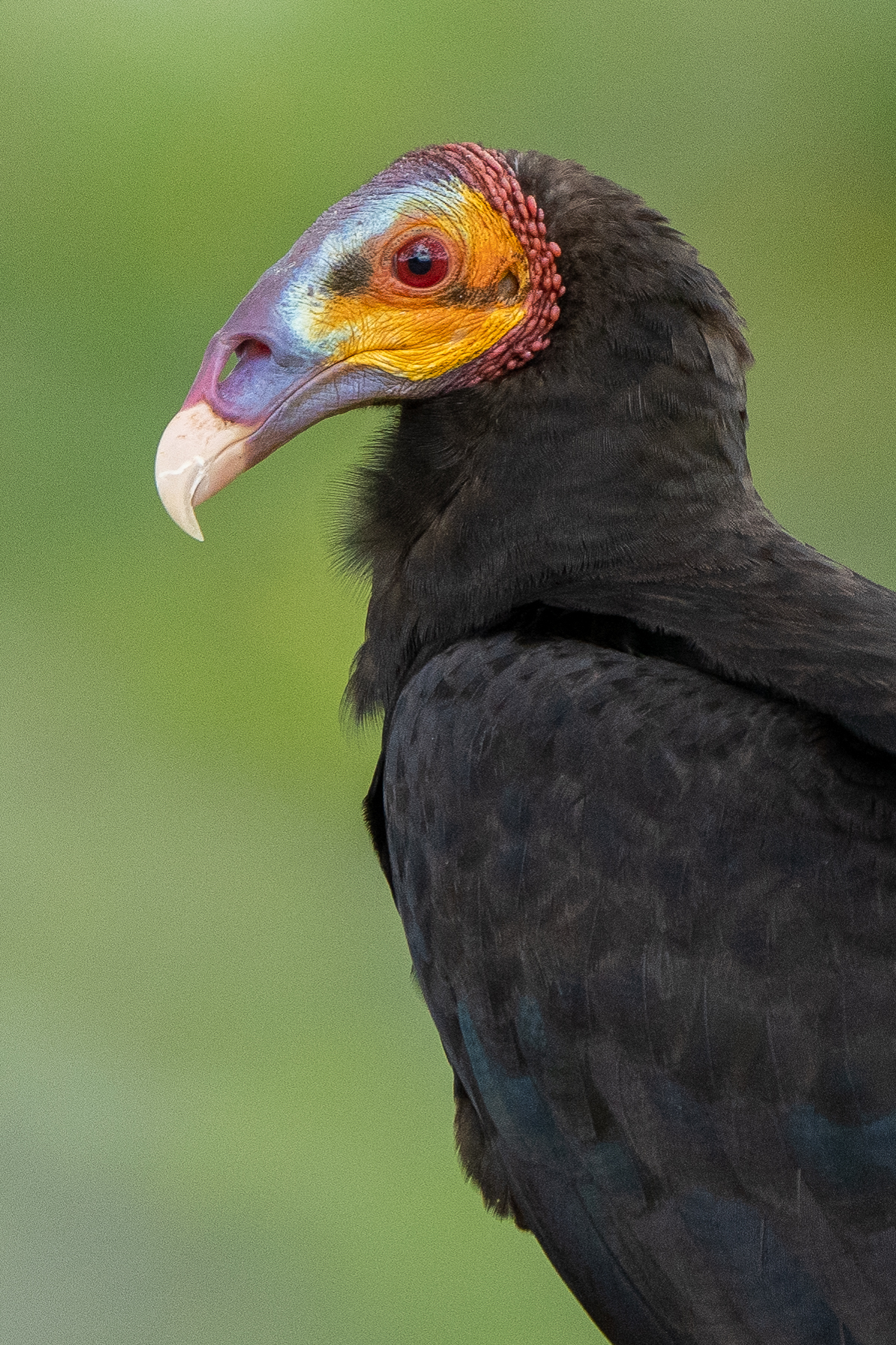
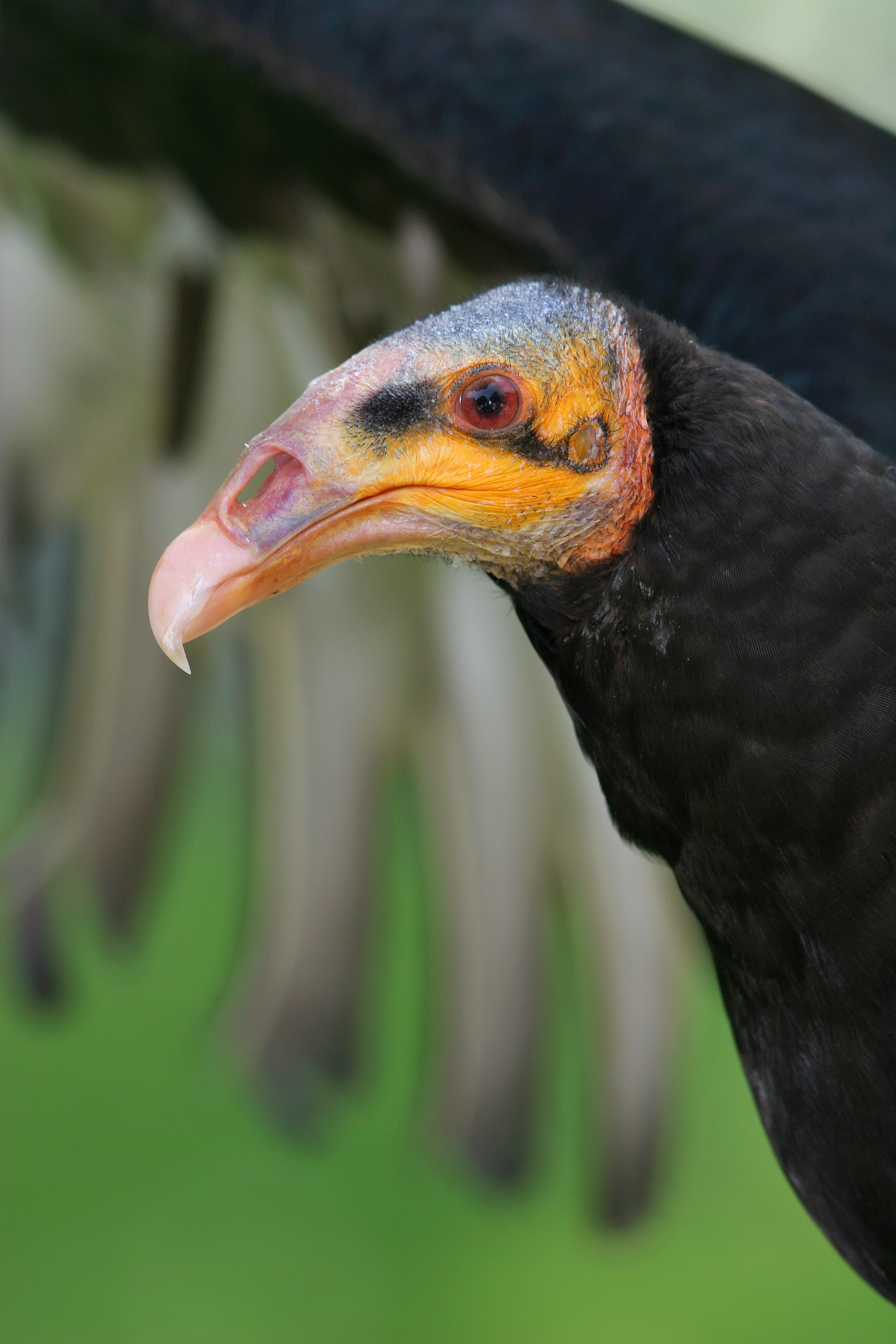
In the wild, Panama (left) and in captivity, Natura Artis Magistra (right)

The lesser yellow-headed vulture is a bird of Least Concern according to the IUCN, with an estimated global range of 7,800,000 km^{2} (3,000,000 sq mi) and a population of between 100,000 and 1,000,000 individuals. Its population trend appears to be stable.
