= Wilson Elso Goñi =

Uruguayan politician

Wilson Elso Goñi (1938–2009) was a Uruguayan politician belonging to the National Party.

He served as mayor of Treinta y Tres Department (1985-1989 and 2000–2005).
