= Quebrada de los Cuervos =

Coordinates: 32°55′39″S 54°27′25″W

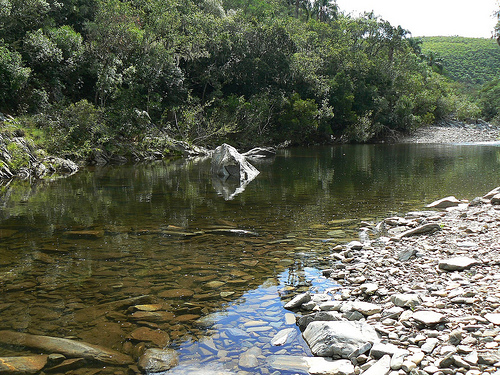

The Quebrada de los Cuervos (Spanish for Crows Ravine) is an important landform in Treinta y Tres Department, Uruguay.

Crossed by the Yerbal Chico creek, it constitutes a natural protected area. This Important Bird Area (IBA) is inhabited by several endangered species, such as Agelaius flavus, Heteroxolmis dominicana, Limnoctites rectirostris, Sporophila cinnamomea, Sporophila ruficollis. The very name of this place refers to crow-like Cathartidae which breed on its cliffs: Cathartes burrovianus, Cathartes aura, and Coragyps atratus.
