= Luis Hierro Gambardella =

Uruguayan politician (1915–1991)

Luis Hierro Gambardella (1 September 1915, Treinta y Tres - 17 July 1991) was a Uruguayan political figure.

== Background ==
He was a member of the Colorado Party.

His father Luis Hierro was a Deputy from Treinta y Tres. His son Luis Antonio Hierro López was Vice President of Uruguay from 2000 to 2005.

== Public offices ==
He served as a Deputy for Treinta y Tres from 1955 to 1967 and as a Senator from 1967 to 1973. He served as the President of the Chamber of Deputies of Uruguay from 1964 to 1965. In 1967, he was Minister of Culture.

Reelected to the Senate in 1984, he served as Ambassador to Spain from 1985 to 1990.

== See also ==
- Politics of Uruguay
- List of political families#Uruguay
