= Luis Hierro Rivera =

Uruguayan politician

Luis Hierro was an Uruguayan politician.

== Background ==
His political roots were in the Department of Treinta y Tres, in the interior of the country.

His son Luis Hierro Gambardella became a Minister, Deputy and Senator. His grandson Luis Antonio Hierro López became Vice President of Uruguay in 2000.

== Political role and legacy ==
Hierro served as a Deputy for the Department of Treinta y Tres from 1920 to 1923. This constituency was in 1955 to elect his son Luis Hierro Gambardella to the same office.

== See also ==
- Politics of Uruguay
- List of political families#Uruguay
