= Cerro del Verdún =

Buddhist temple in Uruguay

Coordinates: 34°22′00″S 55°17′00″W

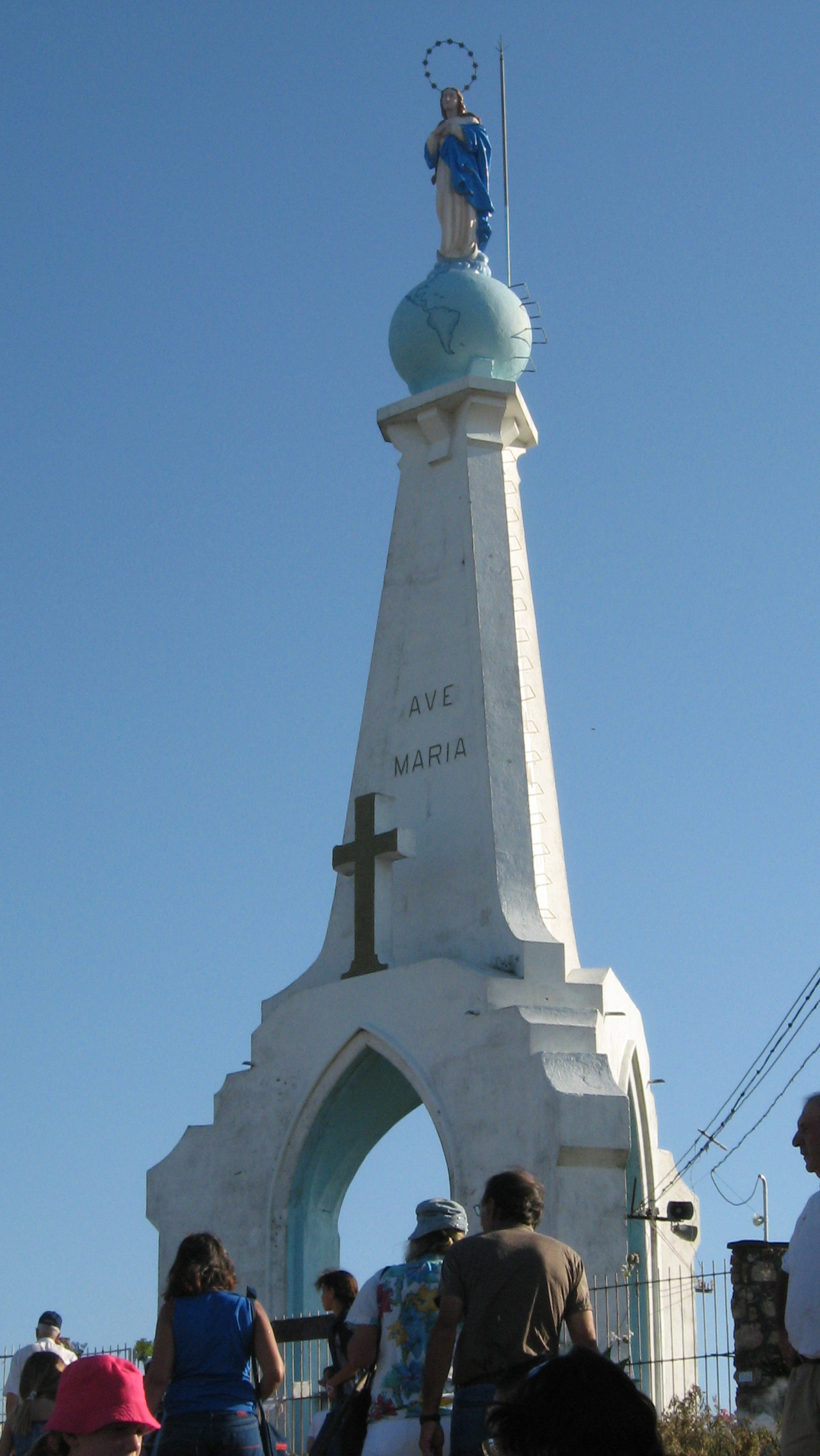
Image of the Virgin Mary on Verdún Hill.

Cerro del Verdún (English: Verdun Hill) is a Roman Catholic pilgrimage site in Lavalleja Department, Uruguay.
