= Lemeš =

Lemeš may refer to:

- Lemeš, Bačka, the pre-1925 name of the village now called Svetozar Miletić near Sombor, Serbia
- Lemeš, Croatia, a village near Križevci, Croatia
