= Mariscala =

- Town
- Location in Uruguay
- Coordinates: 34°2′0″S 54°47′0″W
- Country: Uruguay
- Department: Lavalleja Department

Population (2011)
  - Total: 1,626
- Time zone: UTC -3
- Postal code: 30001
- Dial plan: +598 4449 (+4 digits)

Mariscala is a small town in the Lavalleja Department of southeastern Uruguay.

== Geography ==
The town is located on Route 8, 60 kilometres (37 mi) northeast of Minas.

== History ==
Its status was elevated to "Pueblo" (village) category on 1 February 1918 by decree Ley Nº 5.639 and on 27 June 1988 to "Villa" (town) by decree Ley Nº 15.960.

== Population ==
In 2011 Mariscala had a population of 1,626.

Year	Population
1908	2,464
1963	1,440
1975	1,395
1985	1,415
1996	1,507
2004	1,624
2011	1,626

Source: Instituto Nacional de Estadística de Uruguay

== Places of worship ==
- Our Lady of Pompei Parish Church (Roman Catholic)
