= General Enrique Martínez =

General Enrique Martínez La Charqueada
- Village
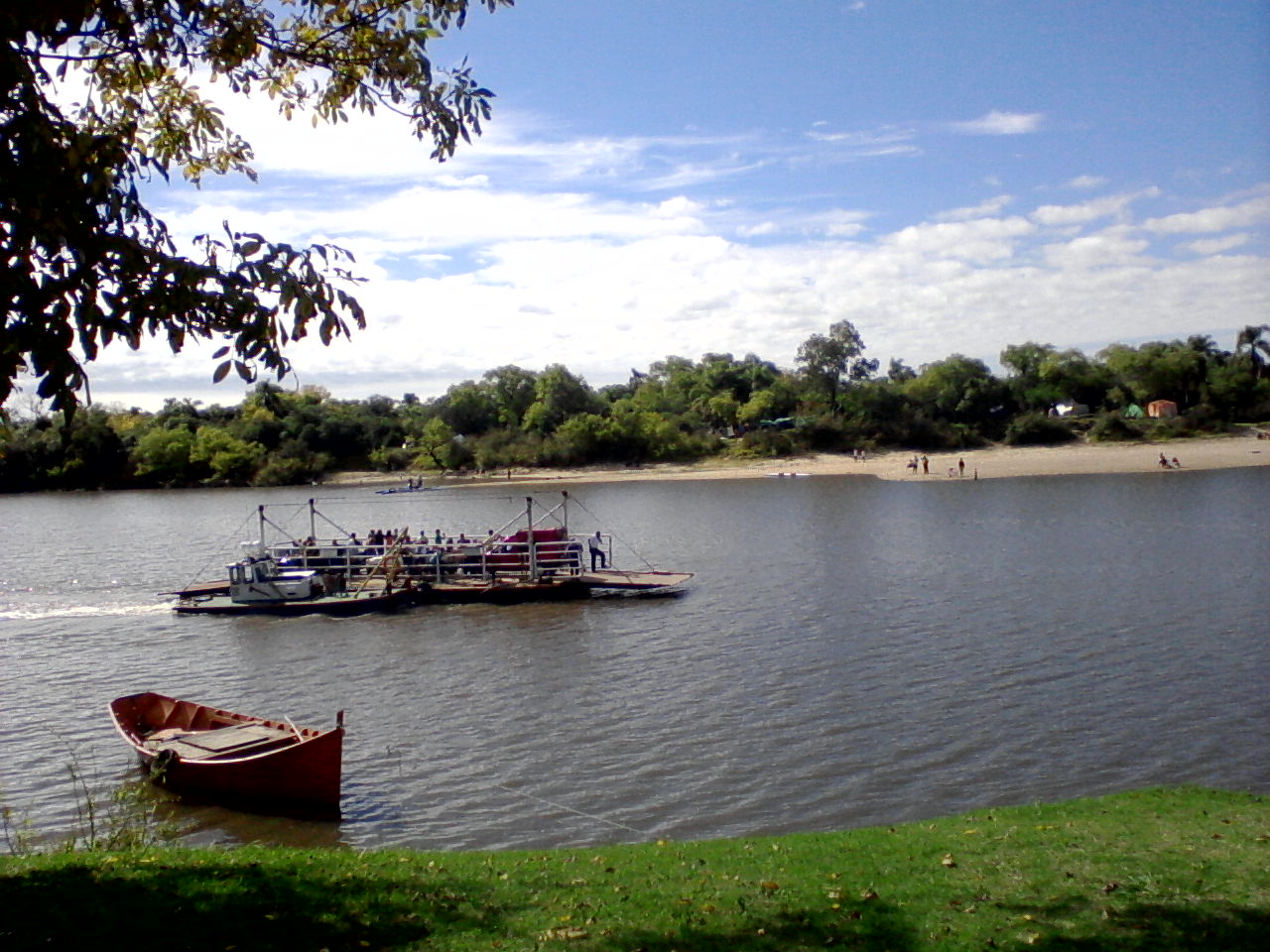
- Pontoon ferry over Cebollatí River at La Charqueada

- Location in Uruguay
- Coordinates: 33°12′24″S 53°48′19″W
- Country: Uruguay
- Department: Treinta y Tres Department
- Founded: 1914

Population (2011)
  - Total: 1,430
- Time zone: UTC -3
- Postal code: 33002
- Dial plan: +598 4458 (+4 digits)

General Enrique Martínez, also known as La Charqueada, is a village in the Treinta y Tres Department of eastern Uruguay.

== Geography ==
The village is located at the east end of Route 17, and the south end of Route 91, situated on the north bank of Cebollatí River and west of the mouth of the stream Arroyo del Parao. A small pontoon ferry connects across the Cebollatí River with a secondary street of 7.5 kilometres (4.7 mi), which joins it with Cebollatí of Rocha Department.

== History ==
It was founded in April 1914 and was the head of the judicial section "Ceibos". Its status was elevated to "Pueblo" (village) on 15 October 1963 by the Act of Ley Nº 13.167.

== Population ==
In 2011 it had a population of 1,430.

Year	Population
1908	4,374
1963	931
1975	956
1985	979
1996	1,342
2004	1,513
2011	1,430

Source: Instituto Nacional de Estadística de Uruguay

== Economy ==
The economy based on agriculture, with extensive rice fields that make up part of the landscape, livestock and fish. Tourism is also important. It has a port that served to start trade with Brazil, exporting jerky products, which prompted the town to recently be renamed (La Charqueada).

Tourism and gastronomy are experiencing a boost. There are magnificent places, such as Isla del Padre, on the Cebollatí River.

== Places of worship ==
- Mary Help of Christians Parish Church (Roman Catholic)
