= Lavalleja Department =

Department of Uruguay

Lavalleja
- Department
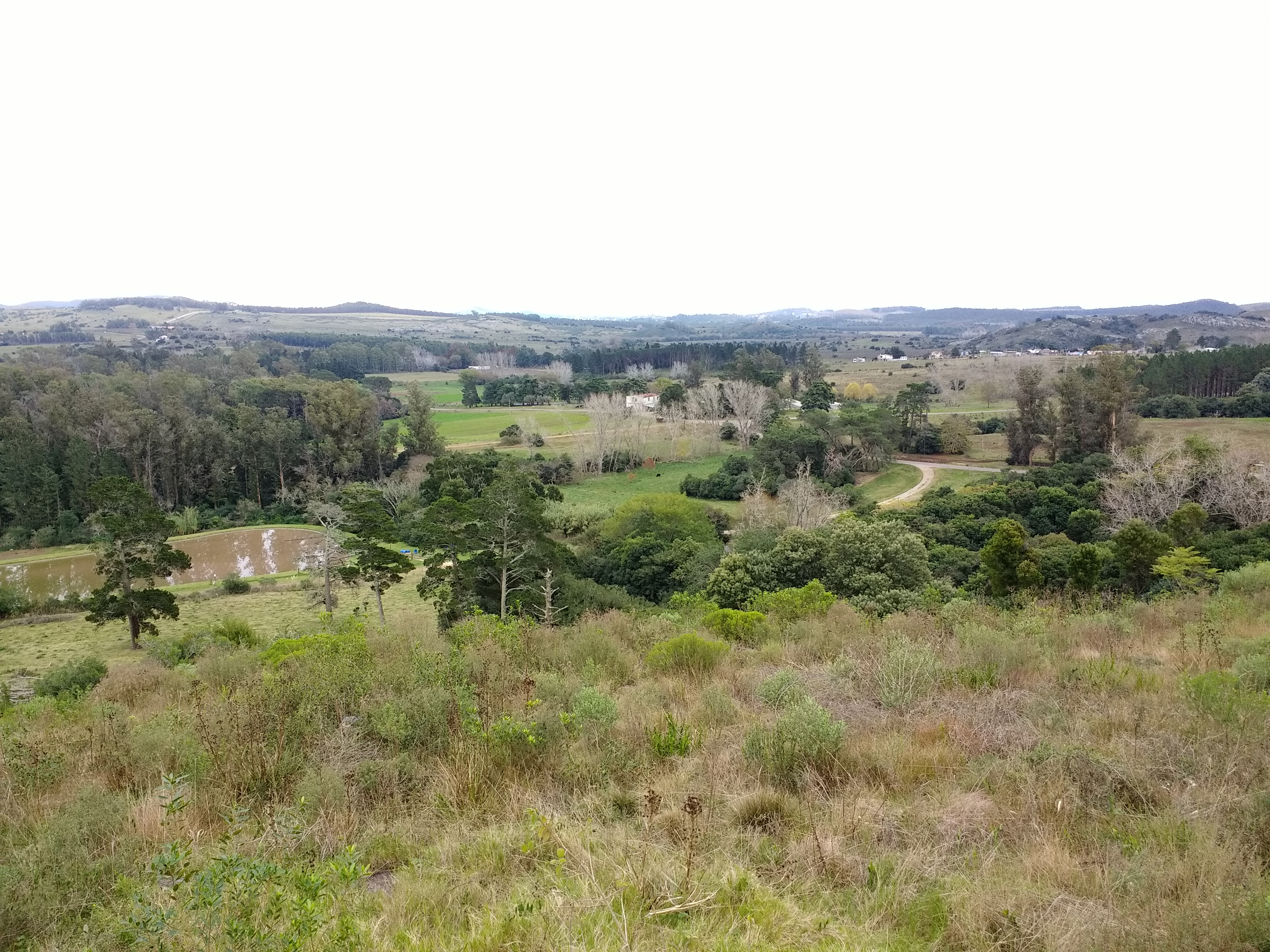

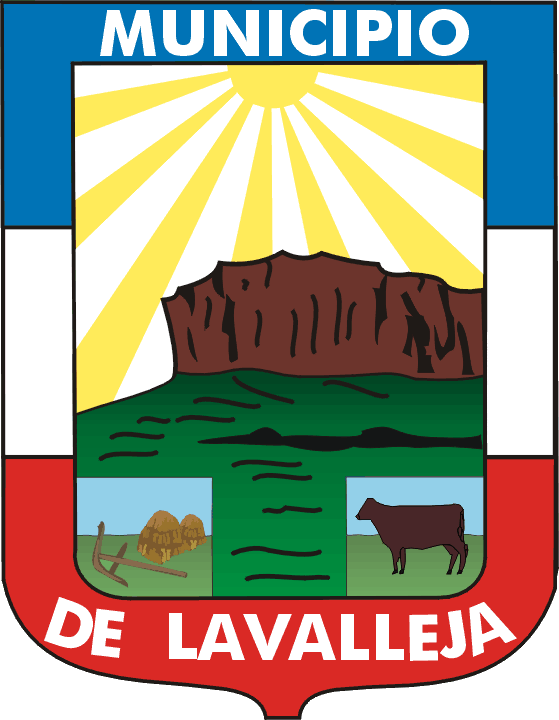
- Flag Coat of arms

- Location of Lavalleja Department in Uruguay
- Coordinates (Minas): 34°22′S 55°14′W
- Country: Uruguay
- Capital of Department: Minas

Government
  - Intendant: Adriana Peña
  - Ruling party: Partido Nacional

Area
  - Total: 10,016 km^{2} (3,867 sq mi)
- Elevation: 250 m (820 ft)

Population (2023 census)
  - Total: 59,175
  - Density: 5.9080/km^{2} (15.302/sq mi)
- Demonym: Serrano
- Time zone: UTC-3 (UYT)
- ISO 3166 code: UY-LA
- Website: lavalleja.gub.uy

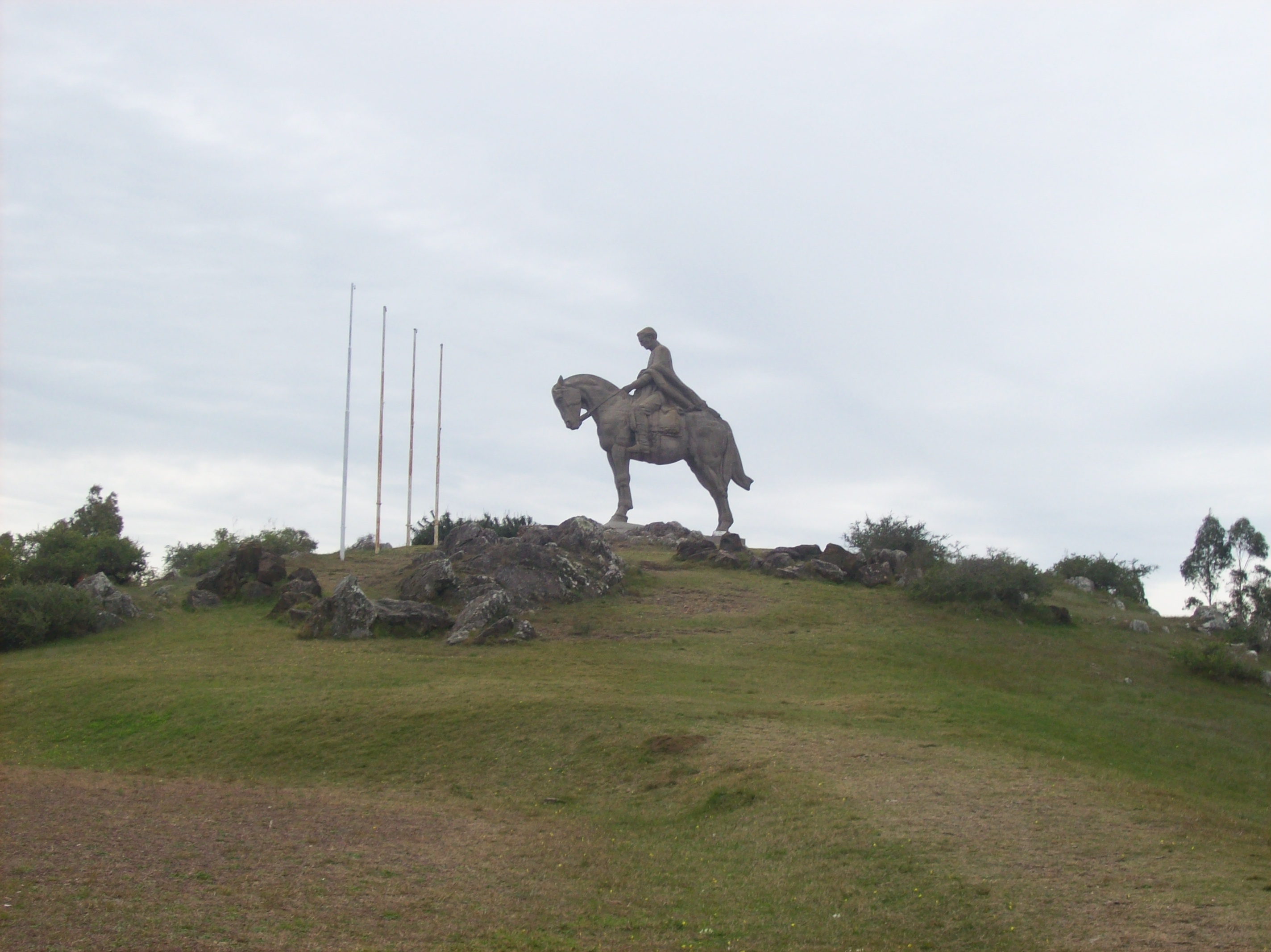
Artigas Hill in Minas, Lavalleja

Lavalleja (Spanish pronunciation: [laβaˈʝexa]; locally [laβaˈʒexa, -ʃexa]) is a department of Uruguay. Its capital is Minas. It is located in the southeast of the country, bordered to the north by the department of Treinta y Tres to the east with Rocha, to the south with Canelones and Maldonado, and to the west to Florida.

The department is named in honor of Brigadier Juan Antonio Lavalleja, who had distinguished military and political action in the country's independence.

== History ==
The department was created on June 16, 1837, from parts of the Cerro Largo and Maldonado departments. It was first named Minas. In March 1888, it was asked that the Chamber of Deputies raised the settlement hierarchy of the village of Minas to be a town and to change the department's name to Lavalleja. The first was approved. From then, and until December 26, 1927, when the name was changed to Lavalleja, widespread debates about the matter were held. There was political will to designate a department under the name of the head of the Liberation Crusade, but not at the expense of Minas, even considering creating a new department named Lavalleja, being rejected afterwards.

== Geography ==
Most of the north border of the department is formed by the Olimar Chico River and Olimar Grande River. Most of the middle and north part of the department is crossed by many streams, flowing from northwest and south directions towards the northeast of the department, all being tributaries of Río Cebollati, which flows to the northeast and discharges into Lake Merín, a natural border with Brazil. These streams, from north to south, are: Arroyo Gutiérrez, Arroyo de los Molles, Arroyo de los Chanchos, Arroyo Polanco, Arroyo Barriga Negra, Arroyo Tapes Grande, Arroyo Marmarajá and finally Arroyo Aiguá, which forms most of the east border of the department. In the south of the department, flowing from east to west is Santa Lucía River with its tributaries, Arroyo del Soldato, Arroyo Campanero Grande and Arroyo Verdún. Another stream in the south is Arroyo Solís Grande, which forms part of the natural border with Canelones Department and flows south discharging into the Río de la Plata near Gregorio Aznárez.

The south part of the Cuchilla Grande hillrange crosses the department from the south to northwest. In the south and near Minas, there are two important tourist attractions, the hills of Cerro Arequita and Cerro Verdún (which is also a pilgrimage sanctuary). A bit further to the north is the hill Cerro Espuelitas.

== Demographics ==
Ethnic groups in Lavalleja (2011 est.)
Ethnic groups	Percent
White	94.7%
Black	4.3%
Indigenous	2.9%
Asian	0.2%
None/Other/Unspecified	2.3%

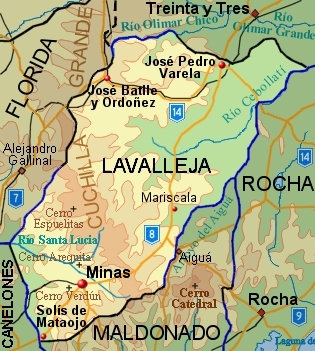
Topographic map of Lavalleja Department showing main populated places and roads

At the 2011 census, Lavalleja Department had a population of 58,815 (28,793 male and 30,022 female) and 27,644 households.

Demographic data for Florida Department in 2010:

- Population growth rate: 0.085%
- Birth Rate: 13.29 births/1,000 people
- Death Rate: 10.23 deaths/1,000 people
- Average age: 35.6 (34.4 male, 37.0 female)
- Life Expectancy at Birth:
  - Total population: 77.47 years
  - Male: 73.59 years
  - Female: 81.26 years
- Average per household income: 23,999 pesos/month
- Urban per capita income: 9,986 pesos/month

2010 Data Source:

Main Urban Centres
Other towns and villages
Population stated according to the 2011 census.

City / Town	Population
Minas	38,446
José Pedro Varela	5,118
Solís de Mataojo	2,825
José Batlle y Ordóñez	2,203
Mariscala	1,626

City / Town	Population
Pirarajá	713
Zapicán	553

Rural population

According to the 2011 census, Lavalleja department has a rural population of 6,070.

== Transportation ==
National Route 8 joins the department with Montevideo via Canelones Department, with Minas being 118 kilometres (73 mi) to its northeast. Route 8 crosses the department in a northeast direction, joining it with Treinta y Tres, capital of the homonymous department and Melo capital of Cerro Largo Department. Route 14, which crosses the country in a west-to-east direction, passes through the north of the department, joining it with Mercedes, Trinidad and Durazno to the west and the Atlantic coast to the east. Route 14 joins the town José Batlle y Ordóñez with the city José Pedro Varela in the department.

The railroad track Montevideo-Minas is active only for cargo trains of the Línea Minas. Another track, following the path of Route 14 through the department, is active for cargo trains from Montevideo of the Línea Río Branco, which continues into Brazil.

== See also ==
- List of populated places in Uruguay § Lavalleja Department
