= Gonzalo Lemes =

Uruguayan footballer (born 1980)

Personal information
- Full name: Gonzalo Daniel Lemes Rodríguez
- Date of birth: May 28, 1980 (age 46)
- Place of birth: Treinta y Tres, Uruguay
- Height: 1.79 m (5 ft 10 in)
- Position: Midfielder

Team information
- Current team: Central Español

Senior career*
Years	Team	Apps	(Gls)
2000–2003	River Plate (Uruguay)	72	(8)
2003–2004	Monagas		
2004–2006	Central Español		
2007	Peñarol	19	(0)
2008–	Central Español	6	(0)

International career^{‡}
2006	Uruguay	2	(0)
- * Club domestic league appearances and goals ‡ National team caps and goals as of 11:56, 19 January 2009 (UTC)

Gonzalo Daniel Lemes Rodríguez (born 28 May 1980) is a Uruguayan footballer. He currently plays for Central Español. He played two friendly games for Uruguay.
