= Zapicán =

- Village
- Location in Uruguay
- Coordinates: 33°31′39″S 54°56′21″W
- Country: Uruguay
- Department: Lavalleja Department
- Founded: 1891
- Elevation: 231 m (758 ft)

Population (2011)
  - Total: 553
- Time zone: UTC -3
- Postal code: 30301
- Dial plan: +598 4463 (+4 digits)

Zapicán is a village in the northwest of Lavalleja Department in Uruguay.

== Geography ==
The village is located on the junction of Route 14 with Route 40, about 24 kilometres (15 mi) east of José Batlle y Ordoñez, with an elevation of 231 m (758 ft). The railroad track Montevideo - Nico Pérez - Río Branco passes along the south limits of the village.

== History ==
It was founded by Pablo Fernández in September 1891 and on 9 June 1913, it was declared a "Pueblo" (village) by the Act of Ley Nº 4.337.

== Population ==
In 2011 Zapicán had a population of 553.

Year	Population
1908	2.751
1963	839
1975	759
1985	670
1996	602
2004	640
2011	553

Source: Instituto Nacional de Estadística de Uruguay
