= Aceguá, Uruguay =

Aceguá
- Town
- Location in Uruguay
- Coordinates: 31°52′0″S 54°10′0″W
- Country: Uruguay
- Department: Cerro Largo

Population (2011)
  - Total: 1,511
- Time zone: UTC -3
- Postal code: 37001
- Dial plan: +598 46 (+6 digits)

Aceguá is the Uruguayan part of a town in the Cerro Largo Department of eastern Uruguay.

== Geography ==
It is located on Route 8, on the border with Brazil. The border between Uruguay and Brazil passes through the town and the two parts are separated by an international street.

== History ==
Its status was raised from populated centre to "Pueblo" (village) on 23 December 1941 by decree Ley 10.101 and then to "Villa" (town) on 14 April 1986 by decree Ley 15.810.

== Population ==
In 2011 Aceguá had a population of 1,511.

Year	Population
1908	3.766
1963	464
1975	929
1985	1,302
1996	1,432
2004	1,493
2011	1,511

Source: Instituto Nacional de Estadística de Uruguay
