= Treinta y Tres =

- Capital city
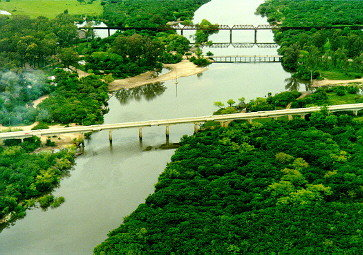

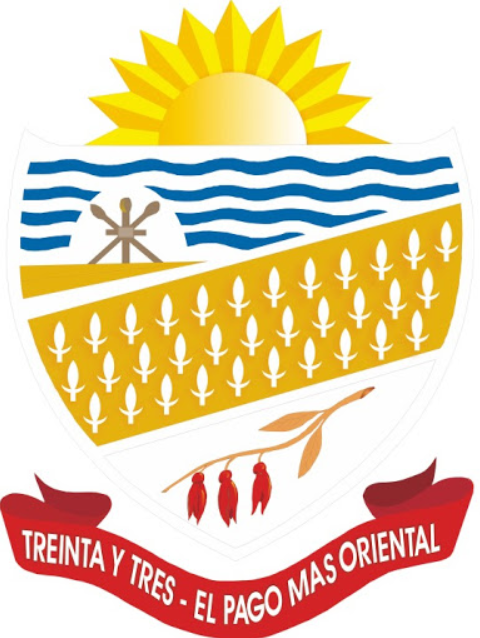
- Coat of arms

- Location in Uruguay
- Coordinates: 33°14′0″S 54°23′0″W
- Country: Uruguay
- Department: Treinta y Tres
- Founded: 10 March 1853

Government
  - Mayor: Mario Silvera Araujo (Partido Nacional)

Area
  - Total: 18.1 km^{2} (7.0 sq mi)
- Elevation: 63 m (207 ft)

Population (2023 Census)
  - Total: 25,890
  - Density: 1,430/km^{2} (3,700/sq mi)
  - Demonym: Treintaitresino
- Time zone: UTC -3
- Postal code: 33000
- Dial plan: +598 445 (+5 digits)
- Climate: Cfa

Treinta y Tres (Spanish pronunciation: [ˈtɾejnta‿j ˈtɾes]) is the capital city of the Treinta y Tres Department in eastern Uruguay. It is known for its role in the development of folk music.

== History ==
Its name means "Thirty Three" and refers to the 19th-century national heroes, the 33 Orientales, who established the independence of Uruguay in 1825. Coincidentally, the city is located near the 33°S line of latitude, making the name doubly appropriate.

On 10 March 1853 it was declared a "Pueblo" (village) by the Act of Ley Nº 307 and on 20 September 1884 it was made capital of the department created by Ley Nº 1.754. According to the Act of Ley Nº 3.544, on 19 July 1909 it held the status of "Villa" (town), which was elevated to "Ciudad" (city) on 29 September 1915 by the Act of Ley 5.335.

Six years later, in 1859, the first school for children was inaugurated. Three years later, in 1862, the first school for girls began to operate.

The first trip that connects Treinta y Tres with Montevideo was made in 1861 by a stagecoach service, but only in 1866 did this service become permanent, also linking the city with Río Branco, Melo, and Nico Pérez. It was linked by railroad in 1912.

== Population ==
In 2023, Treinta y Tres had a population of 25,890. It is by far the largest town in what is a sparsely populated department. Together with Ejido de Treinta y Tres and the southwestern suburb of Villa Sara, they form a population centre of around 33,000 inhabitants.

Historical population

Year	Pop.	±% p.a.
1908	7,718	—
1963	22,557	+1.97%
1975	23,448	+0.32%
1985	25,116	+0.69%

Year	Pop.	±% p.a.
1996	26,390	+0.45%
2004	25,711	−0.33%
2011	25,477	−0.13%
2023	25,890	+0.13%

Source: Instituto Nacional de Estadística de Uruguay

== Economy ==
The economy of Treinta y Tres is based on livestock and derived products. Currently, rice is the main crop grown, flourishing among the city's many rivers. This activity has given a great boost to the region's economy, promoting the pre-cooked products industry and the installation of rice mills. In recent years, there has also been a significant boom in the cement and limestone industry.

== Geography ==
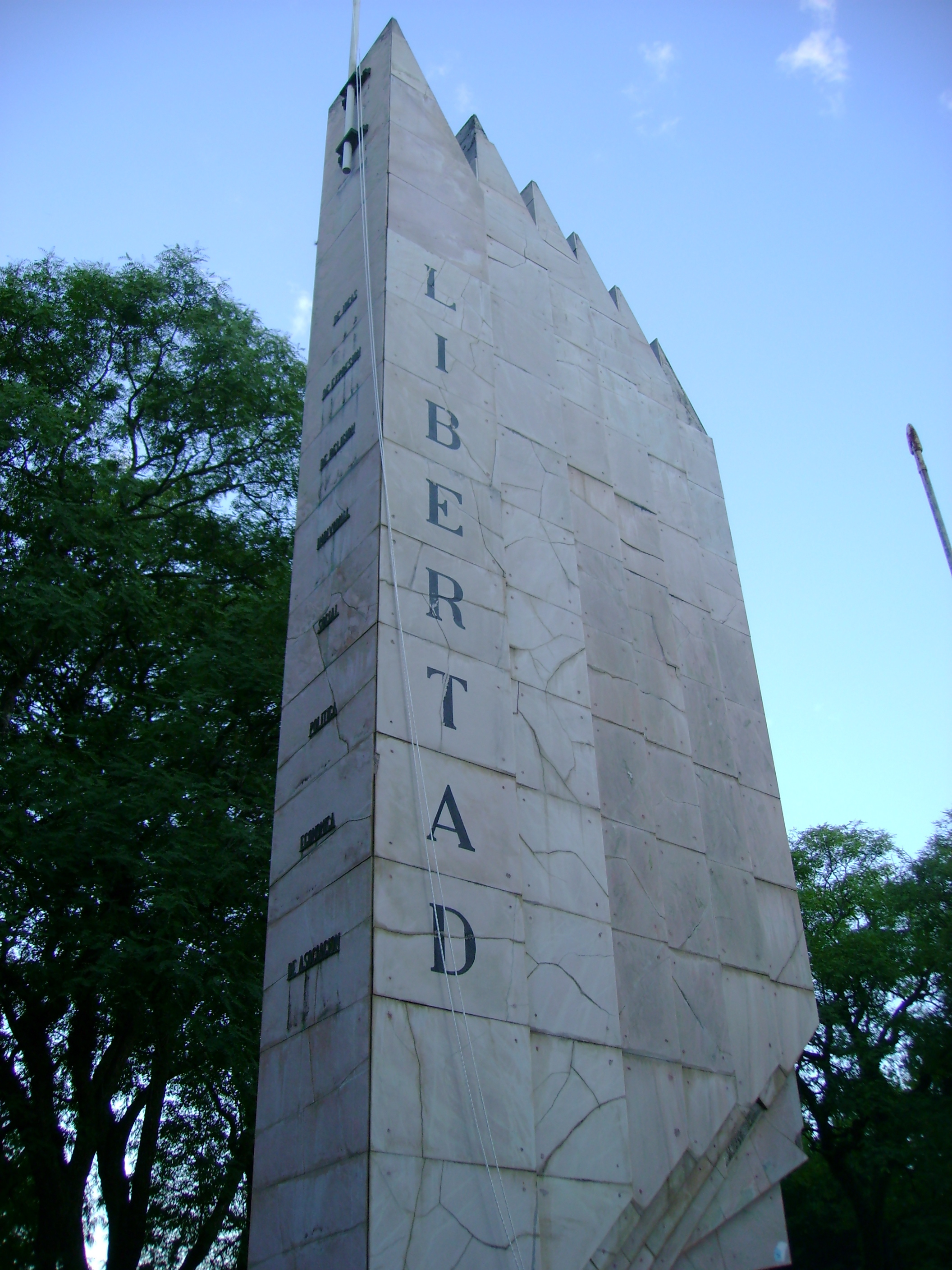
Monument in town square, Treinta y tres

The city is located on Route 8, on the north banks of Olimar Grande River. The city is almost surrounded by a populated rural area, a zone of chacras (ranches), known as Ejido de Treinta y Tres.

=== Climate ===
The climate in this area is characterized by hot, humid summers and generally mild to cool winters. According to the Köppen Climate Classification system, Treinta y Tres has a humid subtropical climate, abbreviated "Cfa" on climate maps.

Climate data for Treinta y Tres (1991–2020, extremes 1939–2020)
Month	Jan	Feb	Mar	Apr	May	Jun	Jul	Aug	Sep	Oct	Nov	Dec	Year
Record high °C (°F)	41.1 (106.0)	40.5 (104.9)	40.2 (104.4)	36.4 (97.5)	31.2 (88.2)	29.0 (84.2)	31.2 (88.2)	34.7 (94.5)	35.0 (95.0)	34.8 (94.6)	39.7 (103.5)	41.5 (106.7)	41.5 (106.7)
Mean daily maximum °C (°F)	30.0 (86.0)	29.0 (84.2)	27.5 (81.5)	23.9 (75.0)	20.1 (68.2)	17.1 (62.8)	16.5 (61.7)	18.4 (65.1)	19.8 (67.6)	22.8 (73.0)	25.8 (78.4)	28.5 (83.3)	23.3 (73.9)
Daily mean °C (°F)	23.9 (75.0)	23.3 (73.9)	21.7 (71.1)	18.4 (65.1)	14.9 (58.8)	12.2 (54.0)	11.6 (52.9)	13.2 (55.8)	14.6 (58.3)	17.5 (63.5)	19.9 (67.8)	22.2 (72.0)	17.8 (64.0)
Mean daily minimum °C (°F)	17.8 (64.0)	17.6 (63.7)	16.0 (60.8)	13.0 (55.4)	9.8 (49.6)	7.4 (45.3)	6.7 (44.1)	8.0 (46.4)	9.4 (48.9)	12.1 (53.8)	14.0 (57.2)	16.1 (61.0)	12.3 (54.1)
Record low °C (°F)	1.8 (35.2)	4.5 (40.1)	2.0 (35.6)	−1.2 (29.8)	−2.8 (27.0)	−7.6 (18.3)	−4.6 (23.7)	−4.0 (24.8)	−4.2 (24.4)	−1.2 (29.8)	1.4 (34.5)	1.0 (33.8)	−7.6 (18.3)
Average precipitation mm (inches)	110.1 (4.33)	121.2 (4.77)	107.7 (4.24)	137.8 (5.43)	136.6 (5.38)	125.5 (4.94)	107.7 (4.24)	118.7 (4.67)	118.8 (4.68)	120.8 (4.76)	82.5 (3.25)	122.6 (4.83)	1,410 (55.52)
Average precipitation days (≥ 1.0 mm)	7	7	7	7	7	8	7	7	7	8	6	8	86
Average relative humidity (%)	70	74	76	79	81	83	81	79	77	75	72	70	76
Mean monthly sunshine hours	266.6	214.7	220.1	183.0	170.5	132.0	145.7	164.3	174.0	210.8	240.0	263.5	2,385.2
Mean daily sunshine hours	8.6	7.6	7.1	6.1	5.5	4.4	4.7	5.3	5.8	6.8	8.0	8.5	6.5
Source 1: Instituto Uruguayo de Metereología
Source 2: NOAA (precipitation and sun 1991–2020), Instituto Nacional de Investigación Agropecuaria (humidity and sun 1980–2009)

== Places of worship ==
- St. Joseph the Worker Parish Church (Roman Catholic)
- Parish Church of Our Lady of the Thirty-Three (Roman Catholic)
- Parish Church of the Holy Savior (Roman Catholic)

== Notable people ==
- Emiliano Alfaro - footballer
- Víctor Diogo - footballer
- Gonzalo Lemes - footballer
- José Sasía - footballer
- Darío Silva - footballer
- Octavio Rivero - footballer
- José Pepe Guerra -Singer/writer
