= Treinta y Tres Department =

Department of Uruguay

Treinta y Tres
- Department
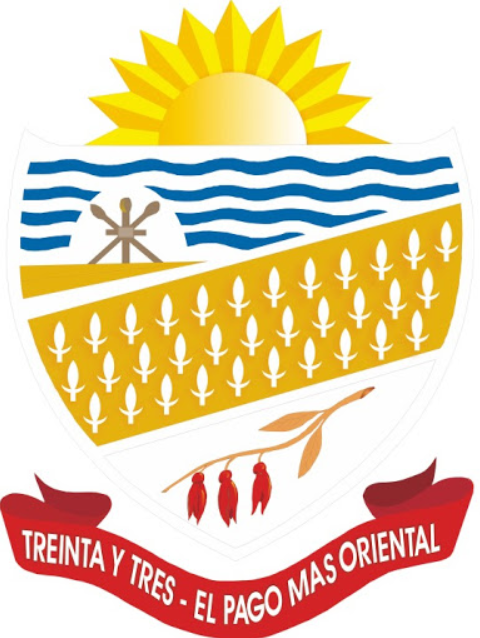
- Flag Coat of arms

- Location of Treinta y Tres Department in Uruguay
- Coordinates (Treinta y Tres): 33°14′S 54°23′W
- Country: Uruguay
- Capital of Department: Treinta y Tres

Government
  - Intendant: Dardo Sánchez Cal
  - Ruling party: Partido Nacional

Area
  - Total: 9,529 km^{2} (3,679 sq mi)
- Elevation: 163 m (535 ft)

Population (2023 census)
  - Total: 47,706
  - Density: 5.006/km^{2} (12.97/sq mi)
- Demonym: Olimareño
- Time zone: UTC-3 (UYT)
- ISO 3166 code: UY-TT
- Website: imtt.gub.uy

Treinta y Tres (Spanish pronunciation: [ˈtɾejnta‿j ˈtɾes]) is a department of Uruguay. Its capital is Treinta y Tres. It is located in the east of the country, bordering the departments of Cerro Largo to the north; Durazno and Florida to the west; Lavalleja and Rocha to the south; while to its east is the lake Laguna Merín, separating it from the southernmost end of Brazil. With a total population of 47,706, it is the second-least populated department in Uruguay (ahead of Flores) and the third-least densely populated, behind Durazno and Flores.

== History ==
The area now known as the Treinta y Tres Department has been long populated by Indigenous peoples as evidenced by Cerritos de Indios.

When the First Constitution of Uruguay was signed in 1830, the territory of this department was mostly part of Cerro Largo, one of the nine original departments of the Republic. In 1853 the pueblo (village) of Treinta y Tres was created in its south. It was named after the thirty three honoured patriots who fought for and secured the Independence of the old Provincia Oriental, which became Uruguay. A permanent service of transport by horse-drawn carts between this pueblo and Montevideo was first established in 1866.

On 18 September 1884 and by the Act of Ley No 1.754, the department of Treinta y Tres was created out of parts of the departments of Cerro Largo and Minas (the current Lavalleja Department).

== Geography ==
The terrain of Treinta y Tres is practically flat, with the west having the highest attitude and the east being flat. Cuchillas ("blades") are small undulating hills that dominate the western portion of the department.

Treinta y Tres is home to the first national protected area in Uruguay, the Quebrada de los Cuervos.

Treinta y Tres does contain a large number of rivers, streams, and lagoons. The most prominent river is the Cebollatí River, which has the Olimar River as a tributary. The importance of these rivers in both agricultural use as well as drinking water gives rise to the name of the inhabitants of the department, "Olimareños". Another important river is the Tacuarí River.

=== Costas del Tacuarí ===
Costas del Tacuarí (in English Banks of Tacuarí) is a locality in the department. Its limits are Río Tacuarí to the north, Laguna Merín to the east, Arroyo Zapata to the south and Ruta 18 to the west. It is one of the main rice producing areas of Uruguay. The main town of the area is Estación Rincón.

== Demographics ==
Ethnic groups in Treinta y Tres (2023 est.)
Ethnic groups	Percent
White	87.2%
Black	12.2%
Indigenous	6.9%
Asian	0.6%
None/Other/Unspecified	4.4%

As of the census of 2011, Treinta y Tres department had a population of 48,134 (23,416 male and 24,718 female) and 21,462 households

Demographic data for Treinta y Tres Department in 2010:

- Population growth rate: -0.158%
- Birth Rate: 13.80 births/1,000 people
- Death Rate: 9.15 deaths/1,000 people
- Average age: 33.7 (32.7 male, 34.6 female)
- Life Expectancy at Birth:
  - Total population: 75.97 years
  - Male: 72.16 years
  - Female: 79.90 years
- Average per household income: 23,122 pesos/month
- Urban per capita income: 8,994 pesos/month

2010 Data Source:

Main Urban Centres
Other towns and villages
Population stated as per 2011 census.

City / Town	Population
Treinta y Tres	25,477
Ejido de Treinta y Tres	6,782
Vergara	3,810
Santa Clara de Olimar	2,341
Cerro Chato	1,694
General Enrique Martínez	1,430
Villa Sara	1,199

Town / Village	Population
Estación Rincón	674
Arrozal Treinta y Tres	344

Rural population
According to the 2011 census, Treinta y Tres department has a rural population of 3,172.

== Tourism ==
A notable natural landmark is the Quebrada de los Cuervos, 44 km east of the capital city.

== Notable people ==
- Luis Antonio Hierro López - former Vice President of Uruguay
- Luis Hierro Gambardella - former Minister, Senator and Deputy
- Luis Hierro - former Deputy
- Wilson Elso Goñi, former politician
- Eustaquio Sosa - poet and musician
- Pedro Leandro Ipuche - writer
- José Sasía - footballer
- Darío Silva - footballer

== See also ==
- List of populated places in Uruguay#Treinta y Tres Department
