= List of populated places in Uruguay =

This is a list of any populated place in Uruguay by department, sortable by population (according to the 2011 census) or alphabetically. The population number may be followed by a letter indicating the official status of the place as follows:

CC	Ciudad Capital	Capital City	Ba	Balneario	Resort
Ci	Ciudad	City	Fr	Fraccionamiento	Urban fragment
Vi	Villa	Town	Br	Barrio	Neighbourhood
Pu	Pueblo	Village	Ch	Chacras	Ranches
Ca	Caserío	Hamlet	cp	Centro Poblado	Populated Centre (unclassified)

== Artigas Department ==
Populated places in the Artigas Department (census 2011):

Name	Population	Status
Artigas	40,658	CC
Bella Unión	12,200	Ci
Las Piedras	2,771	cp
Tomás Gomensoro	2,659	Pu
Baltasar Brum	2,531	Pu
Pintadito	1,642	cp
Sequeira	1,149	cp
Franquia	935	cp
Cerro Ejido	790	Fr
Cuareim	710	cp
Mones Quintela	531	cp
Colonia Palma	440	Pu
Coronado	438	cp
Cerro San Eugenio	425	
Bernabé Rivera	380	Pu
Cainsa	355	
Portones de Hierro y Campodónico	323	cp
Paso Campamento	264	cp
Javier de Viana	140	cp
Diego Lamas	128	cp
Topador	124	cp
Cuaró	113	Ca
Cerro Signorelli	52	
Paso Farías	38	
Rincon de Pacheco	27	
La Bolsa	16	
Calnú	15	

== Canelones Department ==
Populated places in the Canelones Department (census 2011):

Name	Population	Status
Ciudad de la Costa	95,176	Ci (*)
Las Piedras	71,258	Ci
Barros Blancos	31,650	Ci
Pando	25,947	Ci
El Pinar	21,091	*
La Paz	20,524	Ci
Canelones	19,865	CC
Lomas de Solymar	19,124	*
Solymar	18,573	*
Santa Lucía	16,742	Ci
Progreso	16,244	Ci
Paso de Carrasco	15,908	**
Villa Crespo y San Andrés	9,813	cp
Colonia Nicolich	9,624	cp
Fracc. Camino del Andaluz y R.84	9,295	Fr
Parque Carrasco	8,628	*
Salinas	8,626	Ci
Lagomar	8,066	*
Parque del Plata	7,896	Ci
San José de Carrasco	7,288	*
San Ramón	7,133	Ci
Joaquín Suárez	6,570	Pu
Sauce	6,132	Ci
Atlántida	5,562	Ci
Barra de Carrasco	5,410	**
Tala	5,089	Ci
Neptunia	4,774	Ba
Pinamar-Pinepark	4,724	Ba
San Jacinto	4,510	Ci
Toledo	4,397	Ci
Villa Aeroparque	4,307	Fr
Empalme Olmos	4,199	Pu
Santa Rosa	3,727	Ci
Marindia	3,543	Ba
Shangrilá	3,195	*
Las Toscas	3,146	Ba
Colinas de Solymar	2,813	*
Cerrillos	2,508	Ci
Estación Atlántida	2,274	cp
Migues	2,109	Ci
San Bautista	1,973	Pu
San Luis	1,878	Pu
Dr. Francisco Soca	1,797	Ci
Montes	1,760	Pu
La Floresta	1,595	Ba
Fraccionamiento sobre Ruta 74	1,513	Fr
San Antonio	1,489	Pu
Villa San José	1,419	Ca
Villa Felicidad	1,344	Ca
Estación La Floresta	1,313	cp
Juanicó	1,305	cp
City Golf	1,104	Ba
Aguas Corrientes	1,047	Pu
El Bosque	988	*
Costa Azul	965	Ba
Barrio Cópola	826	Ca
Lomas de Carrasco	806	**
Estanque de Pando	770	Fr
Jardines de Pando	756	Fr
Totoral del Sauce	746	cp
Olmos	662	Ca
Seis Hermanos	622	Ca
Villa Argentina	622	Ba
Villa El Tato	615	Fr
Costa y Guillamón	550	Ca
Villa Paz S.A.	542	Fr
Cuchilla Alta	527	Ba
Castellanos	520	cp
Villa Porvenir	507	Ca
Barrio La Lucha	492	Ca
Jaureguiberry	458	Ba
Viejo Molino - San Bernardo	456	Fr
Bello Horizonte	416	Ba
Parada Cabrera	409	Ca
La Montañesa	396	Ca
Paso Espinosa	333	Fr
Piedra del Toro	332	Ca
Campo Militar	299	Ca
Fortín de Santa Rosa	296	Ba
Santa Lucía del Este	286	Ba
Cruz de los Caminos	279	Ca
Santa Ana	273	Ba
Villa San Felipe	242	cp
Villa Hadita	235	Fr
Estación Tapia	213	cp
La Tuna	204	Ba
El Galeón	192	Ba
Barrio Asunción	184	**
Instituto Adventista	183	Ca
Barrio Remanso	178	Br
Altos de la Tahona	168	**
Los Titanes	153	Ba
Araminda	152	Ba
Paso de Pache	147	
Villa Arejo	147	Ca
Fraccionamiento Progreso	145	Ca
Estación Migues	144	Pu
Paso de la Cadena	142	
Estación Pedrera	140	Ca
Bolívar	139	Pu
Villa San Cono	137	
Piedras de Afilar	132	Ca
Capilla de Cella	119	Ca
Paso Palomeque	98	Ca
Carrasco International Airport	90	Fr
Guazú-Virá	86	Ba
Carmel	80	**
Argentino	68	
Haras de Lago	68	**
Biarritz	57	Ba
Quintas del Bosque	57	**
Colinas de Carrasco	56	
Country Villa Juana	44	

* Parts of Ciudad de la Costa and the municipality of the same name.
** Localities connected to Ciudad de la Costa, according to the INE, but which do not belong to its municipality. Their population has not been summed to that of the city in Wikipedia.

== Cerro Largo Department ==
Populated places in the Cerro Largo Department (census 2011):

Name	Population	Status
Melo	51,830	CC
Río Branco	14,604	Ci
Fraile Muerto	3,168	Vi
Isidoro Noblía	2,331	Vi
Aceguá	1,511	Vi
Tupambaé	1,122	Pu
Barrio López Benítez	522	Fr
Hipódromo	505	Br
Lago Merín	439	Ba
Plácido Rosas	415	cp
Barrio La Vinchuca	388	Fr
Arévalo	272	Ca
Cerro de las Cuentas	263	cp
Bañado de Medina	207	cp
Tres Islas	195	cp
Arbolito	189	Pu
Ramón Trigo	150	Ca
Toledo	132	cp
La Pedrera	131	
Poplado Uruguay	104	
Caserío Las Cañas	72	Ba
Quebracho	70	
Centurión	35	
Getulio Vargas	28	
Esperanza	26	cp
Arachania	20	
Nando	13	Ca
Soto Goro	9	Ca
Mangrullo	6	Ca
Ñangapire	5	

== Colonia Department ==
Populated places in Colonia Department (census 2011):

Name	Population	Status
Colonia del Sacramento	26,213	CC
Carmelo	18,041	Ci
Juan Lacaze	12,816	Ci
Nueva Helvecia	10,630	Ci
Rosario	10,085	Ci
Nueva Palmira	9,857	Ci
Tarariras	6,632	Ci
Florencio Sánchez	3,716	Ci
Ombúes de Lavalle	3,390	Ci
Colonia Valdense	3,235	Ci
Miguelete	999	Pu
La Paz	603	cp
El Semillero	600	Ca
Conchillas	401	Pu
Cufré	353	Pu
Pueblo Gil	309	Pu
Campana	298	cp
Radial Hernández	294	Ca
Estanzuela	249	cp
Cerro Carmelo	222	
Santa Ana	222	Ba
Los Pinos	193	Ba
Agraciada	192	Pu
Caserio El Cerro	168	
Barker	158	cp
Riachuelo	138	cp
Paraje Minuano	120	cp
Laguna de los Patos	136	
Arrivillaga	112	Fr
Playa Britópolis	107	Ba
La Horqueta	100	
Zagarzazú	96	Ba
Juan Carlos Caseros	85	
Playa Fomento	84	Ba
Paso Antolín	78	
Artilleros	73	Ba
San Pedro	73	
Colonia Cosmopolita	73	Ca
Blanca Arena	69	Ba
Juan Jackson	68	
Chico Torino	61	cp
Los Cerros de San Juan	60	
Puerto Inglés	60	Ca
Santa Regina	52	Ba
Playa Parant	45	Ba
Brisas del Plata	27	Ba
Playa Azul	25	Ba
El Ensueño	19	Fr
Boca del Rosario	19	
El Faro	9	

== Durazno Department ==
Populated places in the Durazno Department (census 2011):

Name	Population	Status
Durazno	34,368	CC
Sarandí del Yí	7,176	Ci
Villa del Carmen	2,692	Vi
La Paloma	1,443	Pu
Centenario	1,136	Pu
Cerro Chato	1,124	Vi
Santa Bernardina	1,094	cp
Blanquillo	1,084	Pu
Carlos Reyles	976	Pu
San Jorge	502	cp
Baygorria	161	
Ombúes de Oribe	89	
Aguas Buenas	86	cp
Feliciano, Uruguay	77	Ca
Rossell y Rius	72	
Pueblo de Álvarez	29	
Las Palmas	24	

== Flores Department ==
Populated places in the Flores Department (census 2011):

Name	Population	Status
Trinidad	21,429	CC
Ismael Cortinas	918	Vi
Andresito	261	Cp
La Casilla	181	
Juan José Castro	97	
Cerro Colorado	96	

== Florida Department ==
Populated places in the Florida Department (census 2011):

Name	Population	Status
Florida	33,639	CC
Sarandí Grande	6,130	Ci
Casupá	2,402	Vi
Fray Marcos	2,398	Vi
Veinticinco de Mayo	1,852	Vi
Veinticinco de Agosto	1,849	Vi
Alejandro Gallinal	1,357	Pu
Cardal	1,202	Vi
Nico Pérez	1,030	Pu
Capilla del Sauce	835	Vi
Mendoza Chico	810	cp
La Cruz	747	Pu
Mendoza	730	cp
Chamizo	540	Pu
Cerro Chato	409	Vi
Independencia	396	cp
Reboledo	342	Pu
Goñi	246	cp
San Gabriel	172	
Pintado	170	cp
Berrondo	166	Ca
Puntas de Maciel	160	cp
La Macana	91	
Illescas	83	cp
Montecoral	51	cp
Valentines	45	cp
Estación Capilla del Sauce	40	
Polanco del Yí	38	cp
Caserío La Fundación	13	
Pueblo Ferrer	3	

== Lavalleja Department ==
Populated places in the Lavalleja Department (census 2011):

Name	Population	Status
Minas	38,446	CC
José Pedro Varela	5,118	Ci
Solís de Mataojo	2,825	Vi
José Batlle y Ordoñez	2,203	Pu
Mariscala	1,626	Vi
Pirarajá	713	Pu
Zapicán	553	Pu
Barrio La Coronilla - Ancap	301	
Colón	180	Pu
Villa del Rosario	149	
Blanes Viale (Campanero)	104	Ca
Aramendía	96	
Villa Serana	89	
Polanco Norte	87	cp
San Francisco de las Sierras	58	
Pueblo 19 de Junio	55	
Estación Solís	55	cp
Gaetán	49	
Illescas	38	cp

== Maldonado Department ==
Populated places in the Maldonado Department (census 2011):

Name	Population	Status
Maldonado	62,590	CC
San Carlos	27,471	Ci
Pinares - Las Delicias	9,819	Ba
Punta del Este	9,277	Ci
Piriápolis	8,830	Ci
Cerro Pelado	8,177	cp
Pan De Azúcar	6,597	Ci
San Rafael - El Placer	3,146	Ba
La Capuera	2,838	Ba
Aiguá	2,465	Ci
Barrio Hipódromo	1,973	Ca
Villa Delia	1,703	Fr
La Sonrisa	1,562	Fr
Balneario Buenos Aires	1,551	Ba
El Tesoro	1,396	Ba
Playa Grande	1,031	Ba
Barrio Los Aromos	956	Ca
Gregorio Aznárez	944	Pu
Punta Ballena	750	Ba
Gerona	679	cp
Playa Hermosa	611	Ba
Estación Las Flores	397	Pu
El Chorro	392	Ba
La Barra	339	Ba
Cerros Azules	293	cp
Faro José Ignacio	292	Ca
Solís	288	Ba
Playa Verde	269	Ba
Las Flores	241	Ba
Ocean Park	234	Ba
Parque Medina	204	Fr
Canteras de Marelli	200	cp
Garzón	198	Pu
Punta Negra	178	Ba
Nueva Carrara	156	cp
Manantiales	149	Ba
Bella Vista	141	Ba
Sauce de Portezuelo	128	Ba
Los Talas	124	cp
Santa Mónica	111	fr
Punta Colorada	92	Ba
El Edén	85	cp
Pueblo Solís	61	
Ruta 37 y 9	62	Ca
Arenas de José Ignacio	38	Ba
Chihuahua	37	Ba
Los Corchos	24	Fr
Las Cumbres	14	Fr
El Quijote	10	
Edén Rock	8	Ba
San Vicente	4	
Laguna Blanca	4	

== Montevideo Department ==
Populated places in the Montevideo Department (census 2011):

Name	Population	Status
Montevideo (2011-Total)	1,719,453	CC
Casabó	1,976 (2004)	Ba
Santiago Vázquez	1,482 (2004)	Pu
Abayubá	924 (2004)	Pu

== Paysandú Department ==
Populated places in the Paysandú Department (census 2011):

Name	Population	Status
Paysandú	76,412	CC
Nuevo Paysandú	8,578	cp
Guichón	5,039	Ci
Chacras de Paysandú	3,965	Ch
Quebracho	2,853	Vi
San Félix	1,718	cp
Porvenir	1,159	Pu
Tambores	1,111	Vi
Piedras Coloradas	1,094	cp
Lorenzo Geyres	774	Pu
Chapicuy	735	cp
Gallinal	700	Ca
Orgoroso	583	cp
Merinos	528	Pu
Beisso	399	cp
Casablanca	343	cp
Esperanza	340	Pu
Cerro Chato	333	cp
Constancia	331	Pu
Morató	218	cp
El Eucaliptus	197	Ca
Cañada del Pueblo	186	
Estación Porvenir	137	
La Tentación	137	Ca
Queguayar	135	
Piedra Sola	122	Pu
Arbolito	115	
Piñera	112	Pu
Zeballos	81	
Bella Vista	50	
Villa María (Tiatucura)	49	cp
Soto	43	
Puntas de Arroyo Negro	42	
Termas de Guaviyu	38	
Araújo	34	
Pueblo Federación	20	
Cuchilla de Buricayupí	14	
Cuchilla de Fuego	11	
Termas de Almirón	6	
Pueblo Alonzo	1	

== Rivera Department ==
Populated places in the Rivera Department (census 2011):

Name	Population	Status
Rivera	64,465	CC
Tranqueras	7,235	Ci
Mandubí	6,019	Fr
Minas de Corrales	3,788	Vi
Vichadero	3,698	Vi
Santa Teresa	2,657	cp
Lagunón	2,376	Br
La Pedrera	2,363	Ca
Las Flores	359	
Lapuente	321	cp
Paso Hospital	295	
Lagos del Norte	291	Ba
Masoller	240	cp
Moirones	211	
Cerro Pelado	128	Ca
Cerrillada	113	
Paso Ataques	107	
Arroyo Blanco	97	
Cerros de la Calera	88	
Amarillo	20	

== Río Negro Department ==
Populated places in the Río Negro Department (census 2011):

Name	Population	Status
Fray Bentos	22,406	CC
Young	16,756	Ci
Nuevo Berlín	2,450	Vi
San Javier	1,781	Vi
Barrio Anglo	785	cp
Algorta	779	Pu
Grecco	598	Pu
Villa General Borges	362	cp
Paso de los Mellizos	312	cp
Bellaco	283	Ca
Los Arrayanes	248	cp
Sarandí de Navarro	239	cp
Las Cañas	177	Ba
Tres Quintas	149	
Villa María	132	cp
El Ombú	53	cp
Menafra	39	cp
Merinos	4	
Gartental	?	

== Rocha Department ==
Populated places in the Rocha Department (census 2011):

Name	Population	Status
Rocha	25,422	CC
Chuy	9,675	Ci
Lascano	7,645	Ci
Castillos	7,541	Ci
La Paloma	3,495	Ci
Cebollatí	1,609	Pu
La Aguada y Costa Azul	1,090	Pu
Velázquez	1,022	Vi
18 de Julio	977	Vi
Punta del Diablo	823	Ca
San Luis al Medio	598	Pu
La Coronilla	510	Pu
Puimayen	505	Ba
Capacho	457	Ca
Aguas Dulces	417	Ba
Arachania	377	Ba
Barra del Chuy	370	cp
Barra de Valizas	330	Ca
La Pedrera	225	Ba
19 de Abril	205	Pu
Barrio Pereira	186	Fr
Cabo Polonio	95	Ca
Pta.Rubia y Sta.Isabel de la Pedrera	94	
Barrio Torres	83	Ca
La Esmeralda	57	
Puente Valizas	32	
La Ribiera	30	
Puerto de los Botes	21	
Paralle	16	
Palmares de la Coronilla	10	
Pueblo Nuevo	10	
Oceania del Polonio	7	
San Antonio	6	
Tajamares de la Pedrera	2	

== Salto Department ==
Populated places in the Salto Department (census 2011):

Name	Population	Status
Salto	104,028	CC
Constitución	2,762	Vi
Belén	1,926	Pu
Pueblo Lavalleja (Migliaro+Lluveras)	956 (733+223)	Pu
San Antonio	877	cp
Colonia 18 de Julio	750	Ca
Albisu	544	Ca
Rincón de Valentín	481	Ca
Colonia Itapebí	460	Ca
Termas del Daymán	356	cp
Garibaldi	354	Ca
Biassini	345	Ca
Fernández	305	cp
Chacras de Belén	296	Ch
Saucedo	270	cp
Campo de Todos	212	
Sarandí del Arapey	210	cp
Termas del Arapey	184	Ba
Puntas de Valentín	171	Ca
Cerros de Vera	160	Ca
Arenitas Blancas	155	Ba
Olivera	145	
Cuchilla de Guaviyú	138	cp
Las Flores	124	
Laureles	120	Ca
Guaviyú de Arapey	101	
Palomas	88	cp
Paso Cementerio	88	
Celeste	83	Pu
Osimani y Llerena	67	
Quintana	67	
Paso de las Piedras de Arerungua	64	
Paso del Parque del Dayman	54	
Pueblo Cayetano	39	
Pueblo Russo	30	
Parque José Luis	19	Fr

== San José Department ==
Populated places in the San José Department (census 2011):

Name	Population	Status
San José de Mayo	36,743	CC
Ciudad del Plata	31,145 (*)	Ci
Delta del Tigre y Villas	20,239 *	Fr
Libertad	10,166	Ci
Playa Pascual	6,870 *	Ba
Rodríguez	2,604	Vi
Ecilda Paullier	2,585	Vi
Santa Mónica	1,662 *	Fr
Puntas de Valdez	1,491	Pu
Monte Grande	1,287 *	Fr
Rafael Perazza	1,277	Pu
Safici	1,087 *	Fr
Ituzaingó	771	Vi
Raigón	738	cp
Villa María	620	Ca
Capurro	517	cp
18 de Julio	469	Pu
Kiyú - Ordeig	423	Ba
Mal Abrigo	344	Pu
Juan Soler	343	Pu
Radial	250	Fr
González	222	Pu
Scavino	183	Ca
Rincón del Pino	162	Pu
Cololó - Tinosa	149	Br
Costas de Pereira	134	
Carreta Quemada	99	
Cerámicas del Sur	93	Fr
Mangrullo- Pueblo Leoncio Rivero	81	
La Boyada	61	Ca
Cañada Grande	59	
San Gregorio	35	
Bocas del Cufré	28	Ba
Colonia Delta	?	

* Places that have been integrated into Ciudad del Plata in 2006.

== Soriano Department ==
Populated places in the Soriano Department (census 2011):

Name	Population	Status
Mercedes	41,974	CC
Dolores	17,174	Ci
Cardona	4,600	Ci
Palmitas	2,123	Pu
José Enrique Rodó	2,120	Vi
Chacras de Dolores	1,961	Ch
Villa Soriano	1,124	Vi
Santa Catalina	998	Pu
Egaña	783	Pu
Risso	557	Pu
Villa Darwin (Sacachispas)	456	cp
Cañada Nieto	430	Pu
Agraciada	394	Pu
Palmar	381	Pu
Palo Solo	170	Ca
Pueblo Castillos	151	
Perseverano	131	
La Loma	118	cp
Lares	111	
La Concordia	74	Ba
El Tala	73	
Colonia Concordia	43	Fr
Cuchilla del Perdido	35	

== Tacuarembó Department ==
Populated places in the Tacuarembó Department (census 2011):

Name	Population	Status
Tacuarembó	54,755	CC
Paso de los Toros	12,985	Ci
San Gregorio de Polanco	3,415	Ci
Ansina	2,712	Vi
Las Toscas	1,142	cp
Curtina	1,037	Pu
Achar	687	Pu
Paso Bonilla	510	cp
Cruz de los Caminos	463	Pu
Tambores	450	Vi
Balneario Iporá	298	Ba
La Pedrera	240	Ca
Paso del Cerro	235	cp
Cuchilla de Peralta	218	Ca
Pueblo de Arriba	170	
Clara	160	
Sauce de Batoví	133	
Punta de Carretera	110	
La Hilera	107	
Pueblo del Barro	98	
Piedra Sola	88	Pu
Cuchilla del Ombú	87	
Rincón del Bonete	54	
Chamberlain	52	cp
Puntas de Cinco Sauces	51	
Cardozo	42	Pu
Montevideo Chico	26	
Cerro de Pastoreo	24	
Rincón de Pereira	23	
Laureles	19	Ca

== Treinta y Tres Department ==
Populated places in the Treinta y Tres Department (census 2011):

Name	Population	Status
Treinta y Tres	25,477	CC
Ejido de Treinta y Tres	6,782	Ch
Vergara	3,810	Ci
Santa Clara de Olimar	2,341	Vi
Cerro Chato	1,694	Vi
General Enrique Martínez	1,430	Pu
Villa Sara	1,199	cp
Estación Rincón	674	Pu
Arrozal Treinta y Tres	344	
Isla Patrulla (Maria Isabel)	230	cp
Valentines	133	
Arrocera Zapata	116	
Mendizábal (El Oro)	82	cp
Arrocera San Fernando	72	
María Albina	68	cp
Arrocera Rincón	62	
Arrocera Procipa	55	
El Bellaco	54	Fr
Arrocera Los Ceibos	49	
Arrocera Mini	41	
Arrocera Las Palmas	40	
Arrocera El Tigre	39	
Arrocera La Catumbera	34	
Arrocera Querencia	29	
Arrocera Santa Fe	25	
Arrocera Los Teros	21	
Poblado Alonzo	19	
Villa Passano	18	cp
Puntas del Parao	16	
