= ISO 3166-2:UY =

Entry for Uruguay in ISO 3166-2

ISO 3166-2:UY is the entry for Uruguay in ISO 3166-2, part of the ISO 3166 standard published by the International Organization for Standardization (ISO), which defines codes for the names of the principal subdivisions (e.g., provinces or states) of all countries coded in ISO 3166-1.

Currently for Uruguay, ISO 3166-2 codes are defined for 19 departments.

Each code consists of two parts, separated by a hyphen. The first part is UY, the ISO 3166-1 alpha-2 code of Uruguay. The second part is two letters.

== Current codes ==
Subdivision names are listed as in the ISO 3166-2 standard published by the ISO 3166 Maintenance Agency (ISO 3166/MA).

Click on the button in the header to sort each column.

Code	Subdivision name (es)
UY-AR	Artigas
UY-CA	Canelones
UY-CL	Cerro Largo
UY-CO	Colonia
UY-DU	Durazno
UY-FS	Flores
UY-FD	Florida
UY-LA	Lavalleja
UY-MA	Maldonado
UY-MO	Montevideo
UY-PA	Paysandú
UY-RN	Río Negro
UY-RV	Rivera
UY-RO	Rocha
UY-SA	Salto
UY-SJ	San José
UY-SO	Soriano
UY-TA	Tacuarembó
UY-TT	Treinta y Tres

== See also ==
- Subdivisions of Uruguay
- FIPS region codes of Uruguay
- Neighbouring countries: AR, BR
