= Santa Mónica =

- Ciudad del Plata
- Location in Uruguay
- Coordinates: 34°44′11″S 56°26′0″W
- Country: Uruguay
- Department: San José Department

Population (2004)
  - Total: 2,561
- Time zone: UTC -3
- Postal code: 80101
- Dial plan: +598 2 (+7 digits)

Santa Mónica is a small town of San José Department in southern Uruguay. In 2004 it had a population of 2,561. It is connected to Montevideo by Route 1. Playa Pascual lies just to its southwest. Both Playa Pascual and Santa Mónica, along with other populated segments, have been integrated into the Ciudad del Plata in 2006.
