= Paso del Cerro =

- Village
- Location in Uruguay
- Coordinates: 31.4781°S 55.8330°W
- Country: Uruguay
- Department: Tacuarembó Department

Population (2011)
  - Total: 235
- Time zone: UTC -3
- Postal code: 45005
- Dial plan: +598 463 (+5 digits)

Paso del Cerro is a village or populated centre in the Tacuarembó Department of northern-central Uruguay.

== Geography ==
It is located near the border with Rivera Department, about 19 kilometres (12 mi) in a westward direction along a road that splits from the intersection of Route 5 with Route 29, 38 kilometres (24 mi) northeast of the department capital Tacuarembó. The railroad track Montevideo - Tacuarembó - Rivera passes through the village. The stream Arroyo Laureles, a main tributary of Río Tacuarembó, flows 2.2 kilometres (1.4 mi) northeast of the village.

== Population ==
In 2011 Paso del Cerro had a population of 235.

Year	Population
1963	528
1975	308
1985	341
1996	231
2004	310
2011	235

Source: Instituto Nacional de Estadística de Uruguay
