= La Pedrera =

La Pedrera or Pedrera (Spanish, 'quarry') may refer to:

== Places ==
- La Pedrera, Amazonas, Colombia
  - La Pedrera Airport
- La Pedrera, Gijón, Asturias, Spain
- La Pedrera, Rocha, Uruguay
- La Pedrera, Rivera, Uruguay
- La Pedrera (officially "Casa Milà"), a modernist building in Barcelona, Catalonia, Spain
- Pedrera, Seville, Spain

== Other uses ==
- BAP La Pedrera (SS-49), a Peruvian Navy ship
