= Playa Pascual =

- Ciudad del Plata
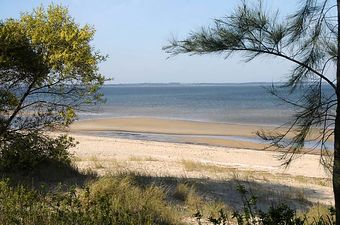

- Location in Uruguay
- Coordinates: 34°44′52″S 56°27′23″W
- Country: Uruguay
- Department: San José Department

Population (2004)
  - Total: 5,653
- Time zone: UTC -3
- Postal code: 80101
- Dial plan: +598 2 (+7 digits)

Playa Pascual was a seaside town in the Ciudad del Plata area of San José Department of southern Uruguay. In 2004 it had a population of 5,653. It is connected to Montevideo in the southeast by Route 1. Santa Mónica lies just to the northeast. Both Playa Pascual and Santa Mónica, along with other populated segments, were integrated into the Ciudad del Plata in 2006.
