= Minas de Corrales =

- Town
- Location in Uruguay
- Coordinates: 31°34′0″S 55°28′0″W
- Country: Uruguay
- Department: Rivera Department

Population (2011)
  - Total: 3,788
- Time zone: UTC -3
- Postal code: 40002
- Dial plan: +598 4658 (+4 digits)

Minas de Corrales is a town in the Rivera Department of northeastern Uruguay.

== Geography ==
The town is located on the banks of the stream Arroyo Corrales, on the intersection of Route 28 with Route 400, about 95 kilometres (59 mi) south of the city of Rivera.

== History ==
In 1878 the mining company Compañía Francesa de Minas de Oro del Uruguay started looking for gold in the area, giving thus birth to the town. From the end of December 1879 to the start of March 1880 Henry Küss visited Uruguay to evaluate the gold concession on the Arroyo Corrales. The company was looking for at least 8 million francs to develop the mines. Küss undertook a careful survey of the mineralogy. His report was unenthusiastic, saying only that it might be worth spending two or three hundred thousand francs on a more systematic study. In 1902 the railway line was inaugurated, which operated until 1916, when the company ended. On 9 November 1920, it was declared a "Pueblo" (village) by the Act of Ley Nº 7.299, and on 13 December 1994, its status was elevated to "Villa" (town) by the Act of Ley Nº 16.669.

In 1997 the mining operations resumed by the company Uruguay Mineral Exploration (UME).

== Population ==
In 2011 Minas de Corrales had a population of 3,788.

Year	Population
1963	2,793
1975	1,377
1985	2,426
1996	2,938
2004	3,444
2011	3,788

Source: Instituto Nacional de Estadística de Uruguay

== Places of worship ==
- St. John Bosco Parish Church (Roman Catholic)

== Nearby attractions ==
About 15 kilometres (9.3 mi) towards the west of the town is the scenic area Rincón de Tres Cerros. Although the whole area is best visible from along the banks of Tacuarembó River, the hills can be approached by a road splitting south from Route 29, 15 kilometres (9.3 mi) after Minas de Corrales.
