= Balneario =

Latin American seaside settlement

A balneario (Portuguese spelling: balneário) is an Iberian and Ibero-American resort town, typically a seaside resort, and less commonly along the shores of lakes and rivers or next to hot springs. In Spain, balneario typically only refers to spa town resorts. These resorts offer recreation, sports, entertainment, food, hospitality and safety services, retail, and cultural events. These balneario towns are characterized by being flooded by masses of tourists during the summer seasons.

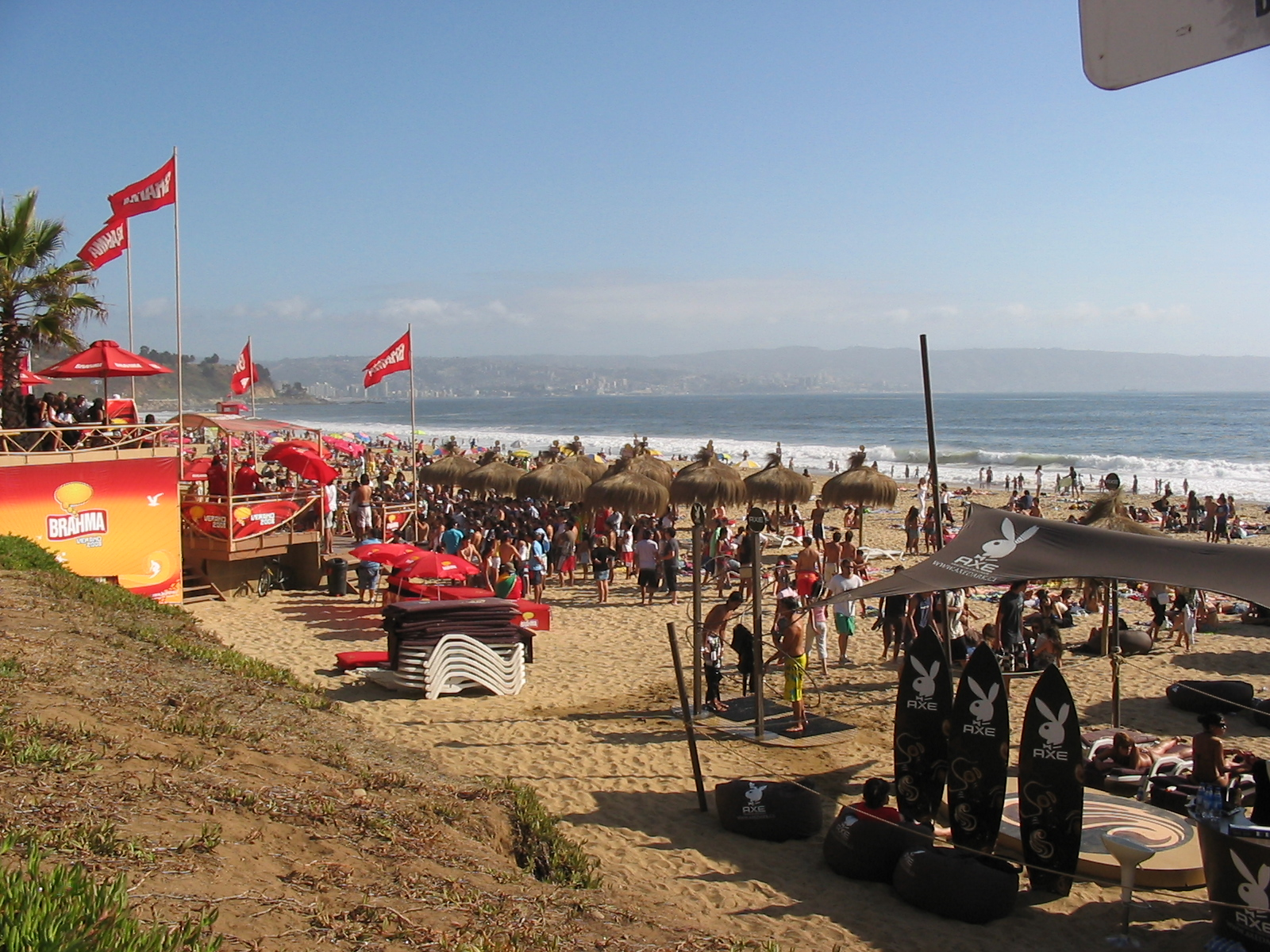
Reñaca beach is a popular balneario in Valparaíso Province that attracts tourists from across Chile, South America, and the world.

== History ==
The word "balneario" comes from Latin "balnearĭus" and initially from Greek "balneae" from Greek βαλανεῖον balaneion, - "bath, bathing room".

Balnearios may be as simple as a beach or as complex as a planned city. Mexico's Acapulco and Puerto Vallarta are balneario city-destinations, for example, while Chile's San Alfonso del Mar is a more planned resort community and its Viña del Mar a city that also happens to be a balneario. Balnearios are characterized by having beaches and hot climates, being seasonal destinations, attracting foreign tourists, and having boom periods surrounding festivals. The word comes from Spanish, and the difference between a "playa" (beach) and a balneario is the services provided at the balneario.

== Playa versus balneario ==
A beach (playa) is a stretch of land that is covered by sand or small pebbles at the edge of a body of water or especially the ocean. A balneario is a specific recreational destination that has amenities. Features such as bathrooms, lifeguards, changing rooms, food options, picnic tables and sometimes umbrellas.

== Famous balnearios ==
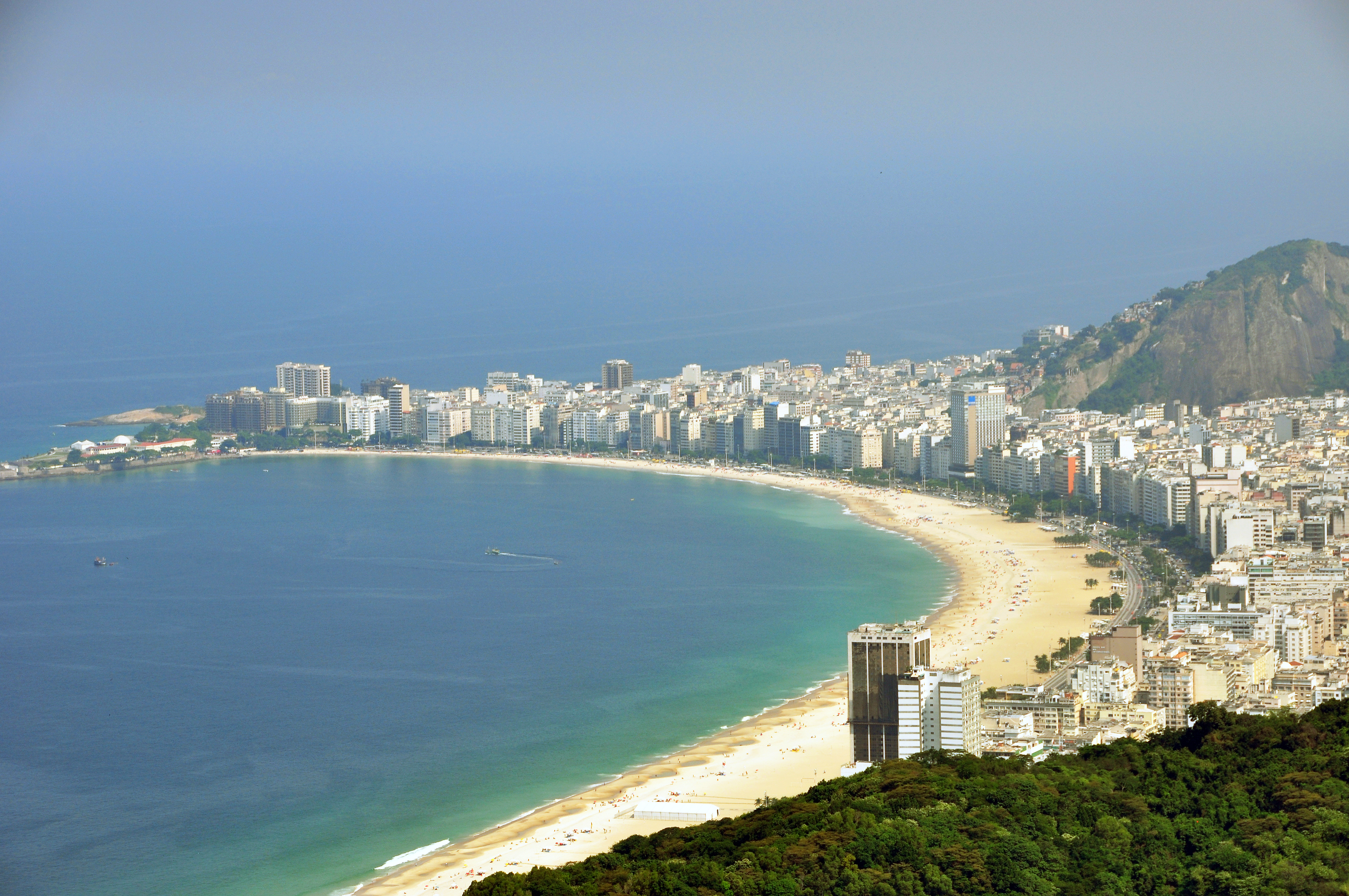
Copacabana Beach, Rio de Janeiro

- Angra dos Reis, Brazil
- Armação dos Búzios, Brazil
- Balneário Camboriú, Brazil
- Copacabana/Rio de Janeiro, Brazil
- Florianópolis, Brazil
- Fortaleza, Brazil
- Guarujá, Brazil
- Ilhabela, Brazil
- Ilhéus, Brazil
- Itacaré, Brazil
- Jijoca de Jericoacoara, Brazil
- Luís Correia, Brazil
- Mar del Plata, Argentina
- Maragogi, Brazil
- Costa do Sauípe, Brazil
- Natal, Brazil
- Porto de Galinhas, Brazil
- Porto Seguro, Brazil
- Salinópolis, Brazil
- São Sebastião, Brazil
- Trancoso, Brazil
- Pinamar, Argentina
- Central Litoral, Chile
  - Algarrobo
  - Viña del Mar
  - Reñaca
  - Zapallar
- La Serena, Chile
- Punta Cana, Dominican Republic
- Montañita, Ecuador
- Acapulco, Mexico
- Cancún, Mexico (Hotel Zone)
- La Paz/Cabo San Lucas, Mexico
- Mazatlán
- Playa del Cármen/Cozumel, Mexico
- Progreso, Mexico
- Puerto Vallarta, Mexico
- San Bernardino, Paraguay
- Máncora, Peru
- Aguadilla, Puerto Rico
- Culebra, Puerto Rico
- Mayaguez, Puerto Rico
- San Juan, Puerto Rico
- Vieques, Puerto Rico
- Cuaró, Uruguay
- Punta del Este, Uruguay
- Isla Margarita, Venezuela

== See also ==
- Balneario da Toxa, Galicia, Spain
