= Villa María, San José =

Villa María
- Caserío
- Location in Uruguay
- Coordinates: 34°30′55″S 56°45′40″W
- Country: Uruguay
- Department: San José Department

Population (2011)
  - Total: 620
- Time zone: UTC -3
- Postal code: 80005
- Dial plan: +598 4346 (+4 digits)

Villa María is a small village (caserío) in the San José Department of southern Uruguay.

== Geography ==
It is located on km.71 of Route 3, 4 kilometres (2.5 mi) north of its junction with Route 1 and 3.2 kilometres (2.0 mi) northeast of Rafael Perazza (by secondary road). Route 3 connects it to the department capital, San José de Mayo, 19 kilometres (12 mi) to the north, as well as to the capitals or main cities of other departments.

== Population ==
In 2011 Villa María had a population of 620.

Year	Population
1963	104
1975	209
1985	279
1996	322
2004	512
2011	620

Source: Instituto Nacional de Estadística de Uruguay
