= Los Pinos, Uruguay =

Los Pinos Playa Los Pinos
- Village, resort
- Location in Uruguay
- Coordinates: 34°26′6″S 57°14′42″W
- Country: Uruguay
- Department: Colonia Department

Population (2011)
  - Total: 193
- Time zone: UTC -3
- Postal code: 70201
- Dial plan: +598 4587 (+4 digits)

Los Pinos or Playa Los Pinos is a village and coastal resort on the Río de la Plata in the Colonia Department of southwestern Uruguay. It is an eastern extension of Playa Fomento and Playa Britópolis, all of which have a small permanent population but form together a sizable summer resort with many streets and houses.

== Population ==
In 2011 Los Pinos had a population of 193.

Year	Population
1963	37
1975	54
1985	92
1996	114
2004	121
2011	193

Source: Instituto Nacional de Estadística de Uruguay
