= Sarandí del Arapey =

- Village
- Location in Uruguay
- Coordinates: 30°59′18″S 56°12′53″W
- Country: Uruguay
- Department: Salto Department

Population (2011)
  - Total: 210
- Time zone: UTC -3
- Postal code: 50018
- Dial plan: +598 47 (+6 digits)

Sarandí del Arapey is a village or populated centre in the eastern part of the Salto Department of northwestern Uruguay.

== Geography ==
The village is located 8 kilometres (5.0 mi) into a road that splits from Route 30 in a westward direction, 17 kilometres (11 mi) northwest of Masoller of Rivera Department and 75 kilometres (47 mi) southeast of Artigas, the capital city of Artigas Department.

== Population ==
In 2011 Sarandí del Arapey had a population of 210.

Year	Population
1963	201
1975	179
1985	162
1996	200
2004	215
2011	210

Source: Instituto Nacional de Estadística de Uruguay
