= Campamento =

Campamento may refer to:

- Campamento, Honduras
- Campamento, Uruguay
- Campamento, Antioquia, in Colombia
- Campamento (Chile), a term given in Chile to shanty towns
- Campamento (Madrid), a barrio of Latina, Madrid, Spain
  - Campamento (Madrid Metro), a railway station
- Campamento (San Roque), a village and district of San Roque, Cádiz, Andalucia, Spain
