= Arachania =

Arachania may refer to the following places in Uruguay:

- Arachania, Cerro Largo, a village in Cerro Largo Department
- Arachania, Rocha, a village in Rocha Department
