= Kiyú – Ordeig =

- Village
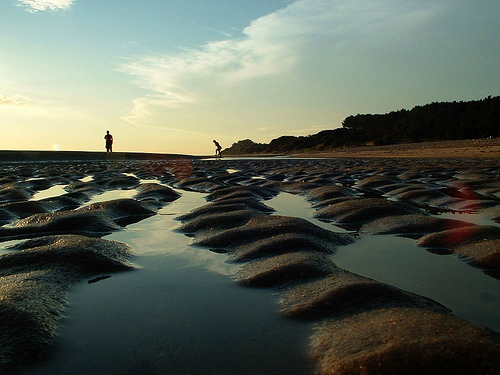

- Location in Uruguay
- Coordinates: 34°42′1″S 56°43′37″W
- Country: Uruguay
- Department: San José Department

Population (2011)
  - Total: 423
- Time zone: UTC -3
- Postal code: 80102
- Dial plan: +598 4345 (+4 digits)

Kiyú – Ordeig is a coastal resort in the San José Department of southern Uruguay. It has two main nuclei 5 kilometres (3.1 mi) apart, Kiyú at the west and Ordeig at the east, joined by a stripe of houses that runs parallel to the beach. The name Kiyú is often used to refer to the whole resort. The origin of the name is cricket in Guaraní.

== Geography ==
The resort is located on the Rio de Plata, around 15 kilometres (9.3 mi) (by road) southwest of the intersection of Route 1 with Route 45, which lies just west of the city Libertad. Another road, also 15 kilometers long, starts on Route 1 at Puntas de Valdez and ends slightly west of the resort.

== Population ==
In 2011, Kiyú-Ordeig had a population of 423.

Year	Population
1975	357
1985	312
1996	414
2004	332
2011	423

Source: Instituto Nacional de Estadística de Uruguay
