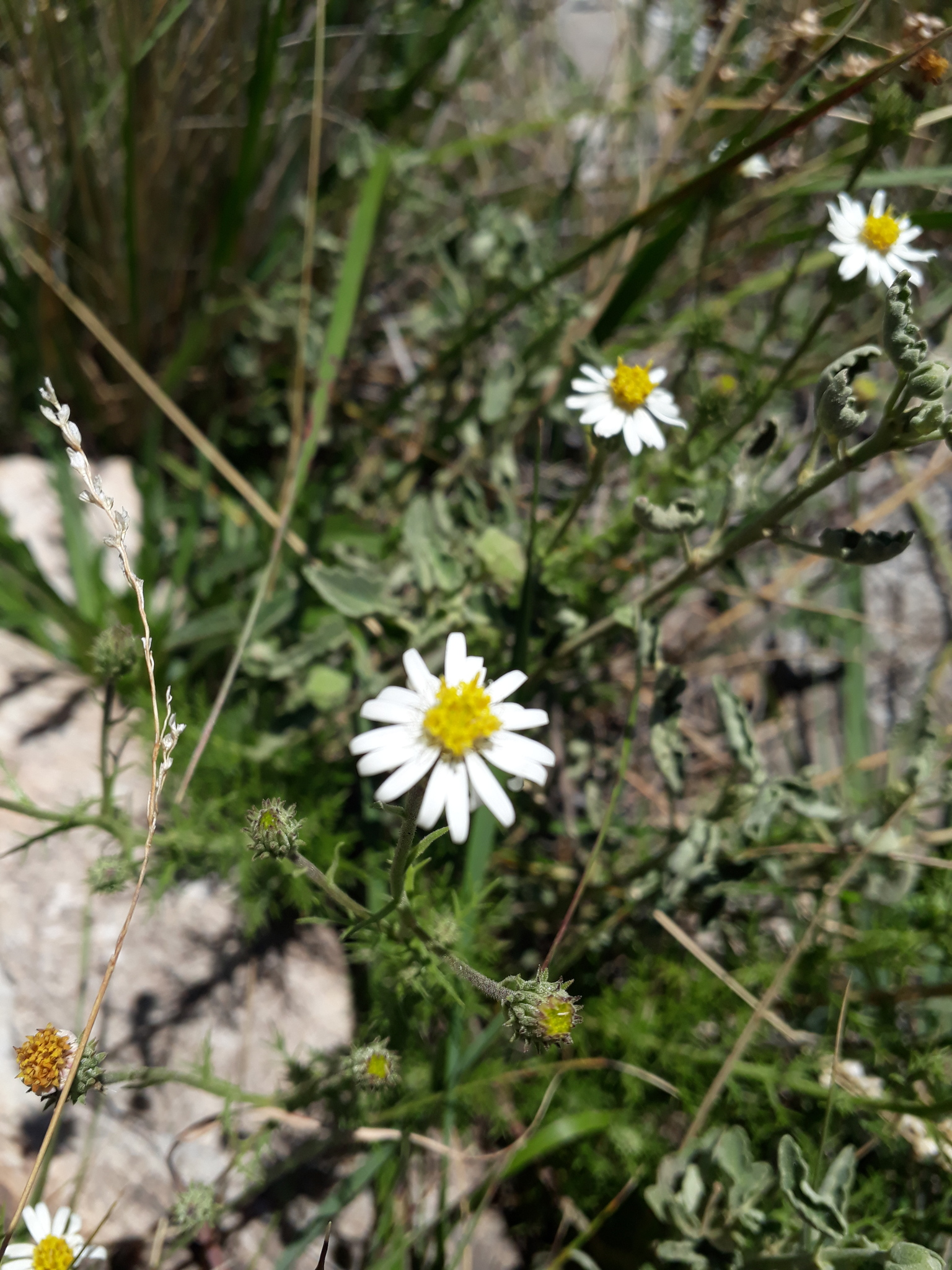
- Sommerfeltia spinulosa in Argentina

Scientific classification
- Kingdom: Plantae
- Clade: Tracheophytes
- Clade: Angiosperms
- Clade: Eudicots
- Clade: Asterids
- Order: Asterales
- Family: Asteraceae
- Subfamily: Asteroideae
- Tribe: Astereae
- Subtribe: Baccharidinae
- Genus: Sommerfeltia; Less.

Type species
- Sommerfeltia spinulosa (Spreng.) Less.

Synonyms
- Microgyne Less. 1832 not Cass. 1827

= Sommerfeltia =

Genus of plants

Sommerfeltia is a genus of South American plants in the tribe Astereae within the family Asteraceae.

Species

- Sommerfeltia cabrerae Chebat. - Uruguay (Tacuarembó, Rivera)
- Sommerfeltia spinulosa (Spreng.) Less. - Brazil (Rio Grande do Sul, Santa Catarina), Uruguay (Canelones, Colonia, Maldonado, Montevideo, Rocha), and Argentina (Buenos Aires)
