= Raigón =

- Suburb of San José de Mayo
- Location in Uruguay
- Coordinates: 34°20′25″S 56°39′50″W
- Country: Uruguay
- Department: San José Department

Population (2011)
  - Total: 738
- Time zone: UTC -3
- Postal code: 80000
- Dial plan: +598 434 (+5 digits)

Raigón is a populated centre and suburb of San José de Mayo, capital city of San José Department in southern Uruguay.

== Geography ==
The suburb is located just north of Route 11, 4.5 kilometres (2.8 mi) east of the city, across the river Río San José. The railroad track Montevideo - San José - Colonia passes through the suburb.

== Population ==
In 2011 Raigón had a population of 738.

Year	Population
1975	192
1985	279
1996	582
2004	583
2011	738

Source: Instituto Nacional de Estadística de Uruguay
