= Grecco (surname) =

Grecco is a surname. Notable people with the surname include:

- Cyndi Grecco (born 1952), American singer
- José Vicente Grecco (1929-2008), Argentine footballer and manager
- Lawrence Grecco (born 1959), known as Larry Ray, American criminal
- Michael Grecco (born 1958), American photographer, film director and author
- Nicolás Del Grecco (born 1933), Argentine footballer
- Richard Grecco (born 1946), Canadian bishop

== See also ==
- Grecco, village in Uruguay
- El Greco (1541-1614), Greek artist
