= Rafael Perazza =

- Village
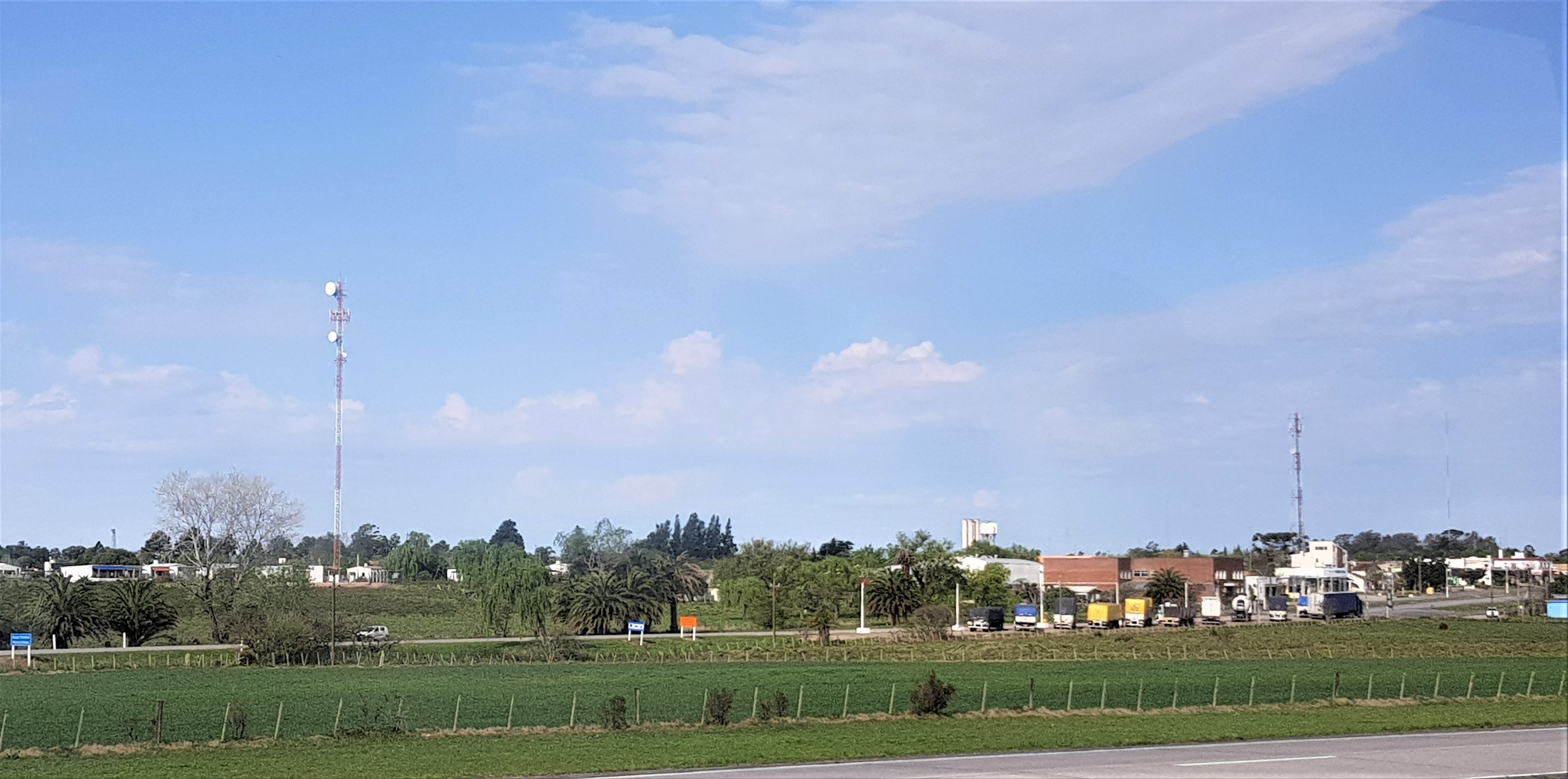

- Location in Uruguay
- Coordinates: 34°31′25″S 56°47′50″W
- Country: Uruguay
- Department: San José Department

Population (2011)
  - Total: 1,277
- Time zone: UTC -3
- Postal code: 80005
- Dial plan: +598 4346 (+4 digits)

Rafael Perazza is a village in the San José Department of southern Uruguay.

== Geography ==
The village is located on Route 1, 4.5 kilometres (2.8 mi) northwest of its junction with Route 3. Its distance from the centre of Montevideo is 72 kilometres (45 mi). Route 3 connects the town to the department capital, San José de Mayo, 23 kilometres (14 mi) to the north, as well as the capitals or main cities of the departments Flores, Río Negro, Paysandú, Salto and Artigas.

== History ==
On 19 December 1957, its status was elevated to "Pueblo" (village) by the Act of Ley Nº 12.479.

== Population ==
In 2011 Rafael Perazza had a population of 1,277.

Year	Population
1963	476
1975	733
1985	774
1996	931
2004	1,235
2011	1,277

Source: Instituto Nacional de Estadística de Uruguay

== Places of worship ==
- Parish Church of Our Lady of Lourdes and St. Raphael (Roman Catholic)
