= Palo Solo =

- Village
- Location in Uruguay
- Coordinates: 33°49′43″S 58°1′23″W
- Country: Uruguay
- Department: Soriano Department
- Elevation: 90 m (300 ft)

Population (2011)
  - Total: 67,170
- Time zone: UTC -3
- Postal code: 70003

Palo Solo is a village in the Soriano Department of western Uruguay.
