= Tranqueras =

- City
- Location in Uruguay
- Coordinates: 31°11′0″S 55°46′0″W
- Country: Uruguay
- Department: Rivera

Population (2011 Census)
  - Total: 7,235
- Time zone: UTC -3
- Postal code: 40001
- Dial plan: +598 4656 (+4 digits)

Tranqueras is a city in the Rivera Department of northeastern Uruguay.

== Geography ==
The city is located on Route 30, about 53 kilometres (33 mi) (via Routes 5 and 30) south-southwest of Rivera, the capital city of the department.

== History ==
During the first decades of the 19th century the area was known as Paso de Tranqueras because of the homonymous bridge over the Tacuarembó Grande river. In 1890 the French Marcos Bourré donated to the state some land for the construction of a railway station. The arrival of the railway became the birth point of a village which grew rapidly with hotels, stores and small industry.

On 22 July 1914 it was declared a "Pueblo" (village) by the Act of Ley Nº 5.107, and on 15 October 1963, its status was elevated to "Villa" (town) by the Act of Ley Nº 13.167. Finally, on 13 December 1994 its status was elevated to "Ciudad" (city) by the Act of Ley Nº 16.667.

== Population ==
In 2011 Tranqueras had a population of 7,235. This makes it the second largest populated place of the department.

Year	Population
1908	4,973
1963	3,658
1975	4,097
1985	4,469
1996	5,792
2004	7,284
2011	7,235

Source: Instituto Nacional de Estadística de Uruguay

== Notable people ==
- Jonathan Deniz, football player
- Carlos Olmedo, tango singer and composer
- Washington Ortega, football player
- Brian Rodríguez, football player
- Richard Sander, politician, Intendant of Rivera

== Places of worship ==
- Sacred Heart Parish Church (Roman Catholic)
