= Topador =

- Populated centre
- Location in Uruguay
- Coordinates: 30°17′52″S 56°49′17″W
- Country: Uruguay
- Department: Artigas Department

Population (2011)
  - Total: 124
- Time zone: UTC -3
- Postal code: 55000
- Dial plan: +598 477 (+5 digits)

Topador is a populated centre in the north of the Artigas Department of northern Uruguay, near the borders with Brazil.

== Geography ==
It is located 20.5 kilometres (12.7 mi) into a road that splits off Route 30 in a northwestern direction, about 23 kilometres (14 mi) west of Artigas, the capital city of the department.

== Population ==
In 2011 Topador had a population of 124.

Year	Population
1963	186
1975	151
1985	161
1996	173
2004	205
2011	124

Source: Instituto Nacional de Estadística de Uruguay
