= San Antonio, Rocha =

San Antonio
- Seaside resort
- Location in Uruguay
- Coordinates: 34°33′03″S 54°04′45″W
- Country: Uruguay
- Department: Rocha Department
- Elevation: 5 m (16 ft)

Population (2011)
  - Total: 6
- Time zone: UTC -3

San Antonio is a seaside locality in Uruguay, Rocha Department.

== Geography ==
The town is located near Route 10, near the seaside resort city of La Paloma.

=== Climate ===
San Antonio is in the Southern Hemisphere's temperate zone and has four seasons. Temperatures average 21 °C to 27 °C (70 °F to 80 °F) in summer and 10 °C and 16 °C (50 °F to 60 °F) in winter.

== Population ==
In 2011 San Antonio had a population of 6 permanent inhabitants. During the summer season, the number of residents is increased significantly due to tourism.
