= Santa Teresa, Uruguay =

Santa Teresa
- Suburb of Rivera
- Location in Uruguay
- Coordinates: 30°55′0″S 55°35′0″W
- Country: Uruguay
- Department: Rivera Department

Population (2011)
  - Total: 2,657
- Time zone: UTC -3
- Postal code: 40000
- Dial plan: +598 462 (+5 digits)

Santa Teresa is a suburb of Rivera, the capital city of the Rivera Department of northeastern Uruguay.

== Geography ==
The suburb is located on Avenida Italia, southwest of the city and northwest of the suburb Mandubí. The stream Arroyo Sauzal flows along the western limits of the suburb.

== Population ==
In 2011 Santa Teresa had a population of 2,657.

Year	Population
1975	162
1985	1,221
1996	1,793
2004	2,171
2011	2,657

Source: Instituto Nacional de Estadística de Uruguay
