= Algorta, Uruguay =

Algorta
- Village
- Location in Uruguay
- Coordinates: 32°25′20″S 57°23′32″W
- Country: Uruguay
- Department: Río Negro Department
- Elevation: 120 m (390 ft)

Population (2011)
  - Total: 779
- Time zone: UTC -3
- Postal code: 60002
- Dial plan: +598 4567 (+4 digits)

Algorta is a village in the Río Negro Department of Uruguay.

== Geography ==
The village is located on Route 25, close to the border with Paysandú Department, 40 kilometres (25 mi) northeast of the city of Young. It is situated on the Cuchilla de Haedo range of hills.

== History ==
On 24 July 1929, its status was elevated to "Pueblo" (village) by decree Ley Nº 8.448.

== Population ==
In 2011 Algorta had a population of 779.

Year	Population
1963	695
1975	570
1985	548
1996	705
2004	804
2011	779

Source: Instituto Nacional de Estadística de Uruguay
