= Washington Ortega =

Uruguayan footballer (born 1994)

Personal information
- Full name: Washington Jesús Ortega Olivera
- Date of birth: 13 October 1994 (age 32)
- Place of birth: Tranqueras, Uruguay
- Height: 1.88 m (6 ft 2 in)
- Position: Goalkeeper

Team information
- Current team: Alajuelense
- Number: 23

Youth career
- –2015: Danubio

Senior career*
Years	Team	Apps	(Gls)
2014–2015	→ Canadian S.C. (loan)	26	(0)
2015–2018	Sud América	1	(0)
2017	→ Canadian S.C. (loan)	11	(0)
2018–2021	Albion	9	(0)
2022–2024	La Equidad	115	(1)
2025–	Alajuelense	24	(0)
- * Club domestic league appearances and goals as of 21 May 2025

Washington Jesús Ortega Olivera (born 13 October 1994) is a Uruguayan footballer who plays as a goalkeeper for Costa Rican club Alajuelense.

== Career statistics ==
As of match played 15 November 2024

Appearances and goals by club, season and competition
Club	Season	League			Cup		Continental		Other		Total	
Club	Season	Division	Apps	Goals	Apps	Goals	Apps	Goals	Apps	Goals	Apps	Goals
Canadian S.C. (loan)	2014–15	Uruguayan Segunda División	26	0	—		—		—		26	0
Sud América	2015–16	Uruguayan Primera División	1	0	—		—		—		1	0
Sud América	2016	Uruguayan Primera División	0	0	—		—		—		0	0
Sud América	Total		1	0	—		—		—		1	0
Canadian S.C. (loan)	2017	Uruguayan Segunda División	11	0	—		—		—		11	0
Albion	2018	Uruguayan Segunda División	2	0	—		—		—		2	0
Albion	2019	Uruguayan Segunda División	7	0	—		—		—		7	0
Albion	2020	Uruguayan Segunda División	22	0	—		—		2	0	24	0
Albion	2021	Uruguayan Segunda División	22	0	—		—		—		22	0
Albion	Total		53	0	—		—		2	0	55	0
La Equidad	2022	Categoría Primera A	37	0	0	0	—		—		37	0
La Equidad	2023	Categoría Primera A	38	0	2	0	0	0	—		40	0
La Equidad	2024	Categoría Primera A	40	1	1	0	—		—		41	1
La Equidad	Total		115	1	3	0	0	0	—		118	1
Career total			206	1	3	0	0	0	2	0	211	1

== See also ==
- List of goalscoring goalkeepers
