= Mandubí =

- Suburb of Rivera
- Location in Uruguay
- Coordinates: 30°55′40″S 55°33′15″W
- Country: Uruguay
- Department: Rivera Department

Population (2011)
  - Total: 6,019
- Time zone: UTC -3
- Postal code: 40000
- Dial plan: +598 462 (+5 digits)

Mandubí is a southern suburb of the city of Rivera in the Rivera Department of northeastern Uruguay.

== Geography ==
To its southeast is Route 5 and the suburb La Pedrera and to its northwest the suburb Santa Teresa.

== Population ==
In 2011 Mandubí had a population of 6,019.

Year	Population
1985	1,705
1996	3,607
2004	5,157
2011	6,019

Source: Instituto Nacional de Estadística de Uruguay
