= Ruedes =

- Parish
- Interactive map of Ruedes
- Country: Spain
- Autonomous community: Asturias
- Province: Asturias
- Municipality: Gijón

Population (2016)
  - Total: 119

Ruedes is a parish of the municipality of Gijón, in Asturias, Spain.

Its population was 118 in 2012.

Located in the south area of the municipality, Ruedes borders the districts of La Pedrera, Gijón and L'Abadía Cenero in the north, and with the municipality of Siero in the south.

There was a leprosería (Leper hospital) in Ruedes during the Early modern period.

== Villages and their neighbourhoods ==
La Figar

- La Badolla
- La Casa Diezmera / La Casa'l Monte
- Los Coletos
- El Pingón

Ruedes

- La Cotariella
- La Quintana
