= Lagunón =

- Barrio of Rivera
- Location in Uruguay
- Coordinates: 30°53′0″S 55°35′0″W
- Country: Uruguay
- Department: Rivera Department

Population (2004)
  - Total: 2,376
- Time zone: UTC -3
- Postal code: 40000
- Dial plan: +598 462 (+5 digits)

Lagunón is a barrio (neighbourhood) at the northwest end of the city of Rivera in the Rivera Department of northeastern Uruguay.

== Geography ==
This barrio is located along the street Presidente Girón, which joins the city with the park "Parque Gran Bretaña". It is only 2.5 kilometres (1.6 mi) from the border with Brazil.

== Population ==
In 2011 Lagunón had a population of 2,376.

Year	Population
1985	559
1996	654
2004	2,154
2011	2,376

Source: Instituto Nacional de Estadística de Uruguay
