= Barrio Anglo =

- Village
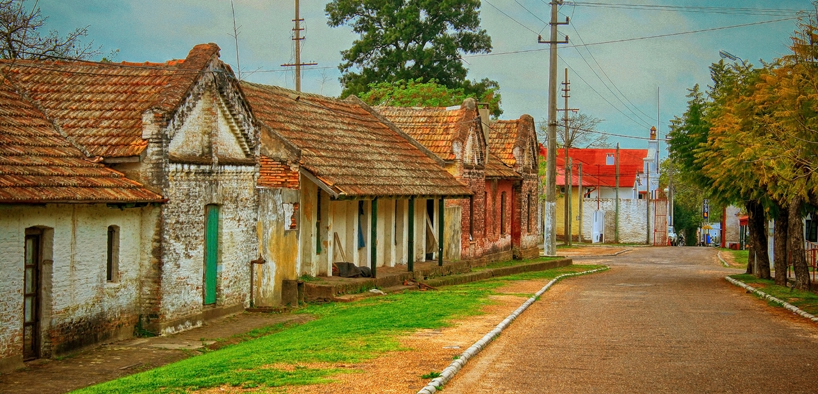
- Barrio Anglo, Fray Bentos.

- Location in Uruguay
- Coordinates: 33°7′10″S 58°19′37″W
- Country: Uruguay
- Department: Río Negro Department

Population (2011)
  - Total: 785
- Time zone: UTC -3
- Postal code: 65000
- Dial plan: +598 456 (+5 digits)

Barrio Anglo is a village in the Río Negro Department of Uruguay.

== Geography ==
It is located just across the stream Arroyo Fray Bentos from Fray Bentos, the capital of the department, being a western barrio (neighbourhood) of the city.

== Population ==
In 2011 Barrio Anglo had a population of 785.

Year	Population
1963	627
1975	708
1985	273
1996	664
2004	818
2011	785

Source: National Statistics Institute
