= Los Cerros de San Juan =

- Location in Uruguay
- Coordinates: 34°13′12″S 57°55′48″W
- Country: Uruguay
- Department: Colonia Department

Population (2011)
  - Total: 60
- Time zone: UTC -3
- Postal code: 70004
- Dial plan: +598 4577 (+4 digits)

Los Cerros de San Juan is a populated centre in the Colonia Department of Uruguay.

== Geography ==
It is located near San Juan River, 8 kilometres (5.0 mi) before it discharges in the Río de la Plata and is about 32 kilometres (20 mi) northwest from Colonia del Sacramento.

== Population ==
According to the 2004 census, it had a population of 60.

== Features ==
The Cerros de San Juan region features sunny summers with cool nights, creating a wide variation in temperatures (up to 18°C). The suitability of the soils for wine growing in the Cerros de San Juan region is due to the rocky nature of the mountains which border the region, with excellent drainage. The red and white grapes grow in pebbly soils.
