= Lapuente =

- Village
- Location in Uruguay
- Coordinates: 31°28′0″S 54°58′0″W
- Country: Uruguay
- Department: Rivera Department

Population (2011)
  - Total: 321
- Time zone: UTC -3
- Postal code: 40004
- Dial plan: +598 465 (+5 digits)

Lapuente is a village, or populated centre, in the Rivera Department of northeastern Uruguay.

== Geography ==
The village is located on Route 29, about 19 kilometres (12 mi) northeast of its junction with Route 27, which is about 48 kilometres (30 mi) northwest of Vichadero and 88 kilometres (55 mi) southeast of the department capital Rivera. The stream Arroyo Yaguarí flows by the west limits of the village and the border with Brazil is only 12 kilometres (7.5 mi) away.

== Population ==
In 2011 Lapuente had a population of 321.

Year	Population
1963	412
1975	292
1985	268
1996	284
2004	315
2011	321

Source: Instituto Nacional de Estadística de Uruguay
