= Rincón de Tres Cerros =

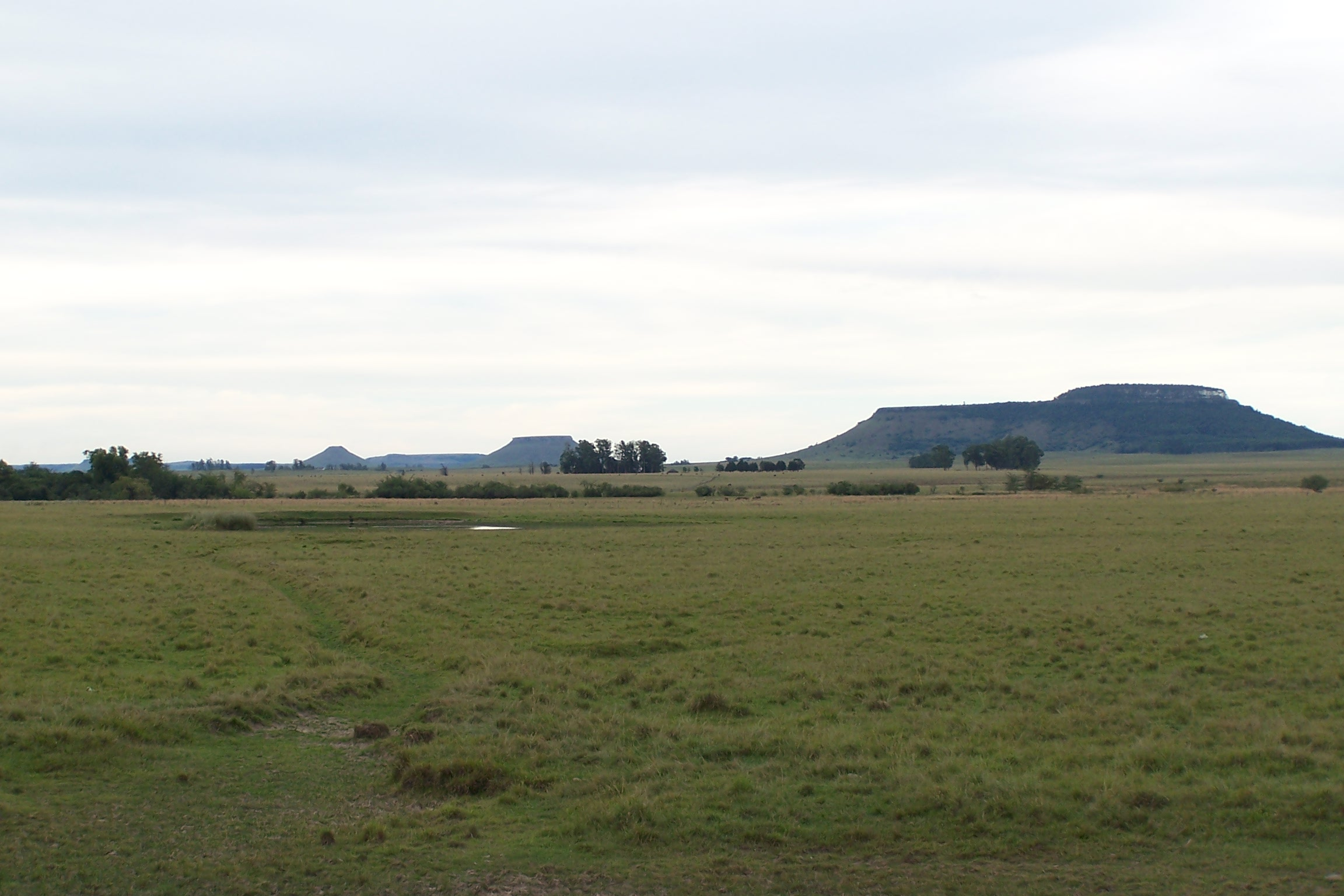
Rincón de Tres Cerros

Rincón de Tres Cerros (literally "corner of the three hills") is an area in Rivera Department of Uruguay, wedged between Tacuarembó River and stream Arroyo Cuñapirú (hence the toponym "corner"). The area owes its name to the three flat "mesas" or butte hills (cerros) aligned in a row, from the biggest in the South to the smallest in the north, which dominate the horizon. Their names are: "Cerro Zapato" or "Alpargata" (meaning "shoe", because of its shape, as seen from above), the biggest of the three, "Cerro del Medio" (meaning "hill of the middle") and "Cerro Chapeu" (meaning "hat" in Portuguese), being the smallest. The hills are mostly bare except for a few native woodland trees around the brim of the "table tops". Cerro Zapato has some Eucalyptus trees that were planted along its north-eastern flank and the eastern part of its top surface. Access to the area is made difficult by sporadic flooding which cuts off the main access bridges: at Paso Rogelio over the Rio Tacuarembó Grande river; at Paso Cunha over the stream Arroyo Cuñapirú; and over an affluent of the Rio Tacuarembó Grande at El Sauce. This flooding has become much less frequent in recent years due to extensive planting of Eucalyptus and Pine forests, especially in the Tacuarembó river basin. There is currently one rural public school in the area, located on the northern slope of the biggest hill, number 87. There used to be three schools in the past: Number 87, one beyond it along the road from Corrales which closed in the 80s, and one at Paso Cunha which closed in the early 90s due to depopulation or rural flight. In the 1900s there was a much higher population in the area than there is now. There used to be a shop/bar/hairdressers near the Cerro Alpargata and also a shop/bar at Paso Cunha.

== Images ==
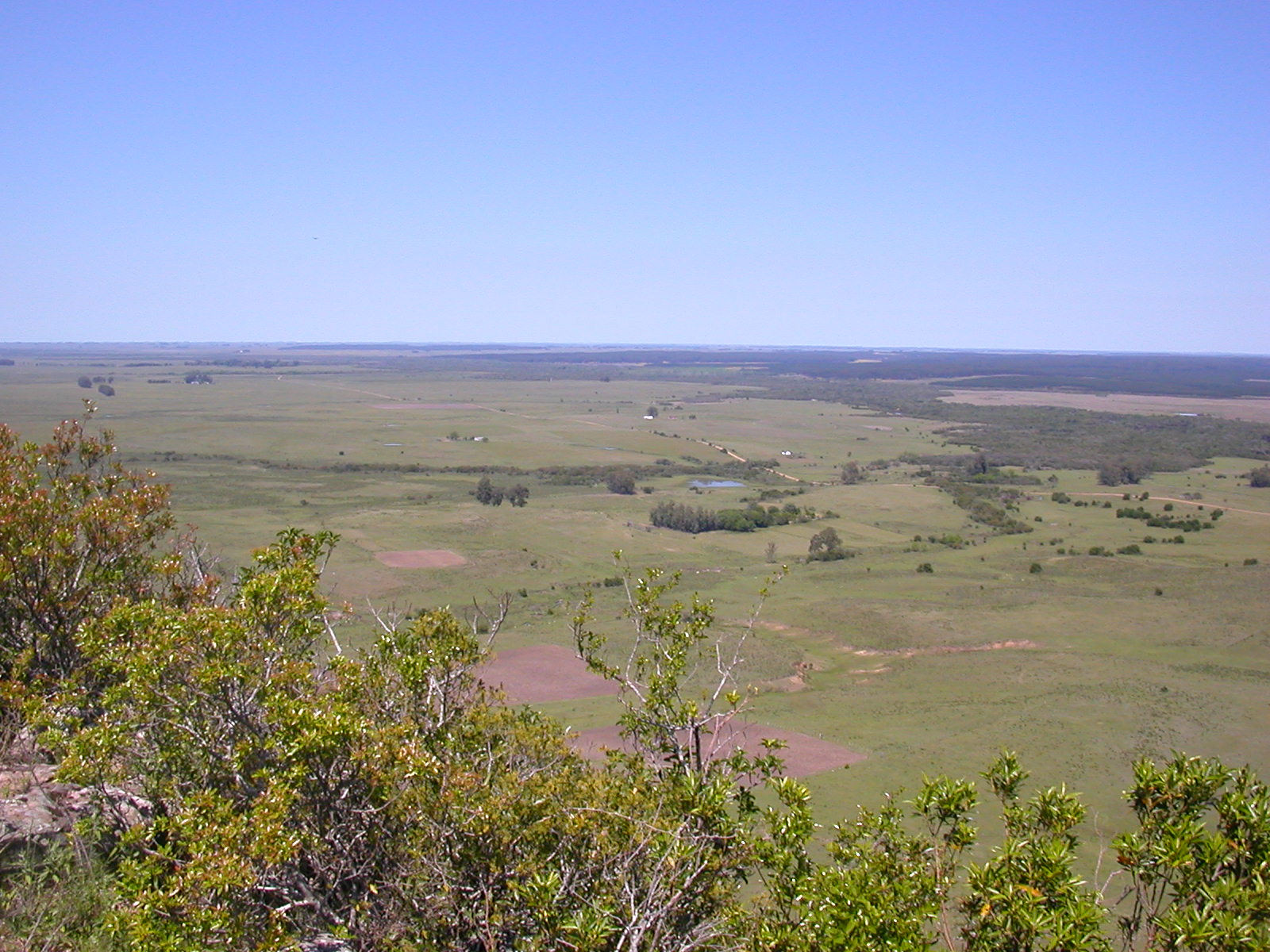
Southeast view from Cerro Zapato

Northwest view from Cerro Zapato

== Geo coordinates ==
- Cerro Zapato 31°37′46″S 55°37′0″W
- Cerro del Medio 31°35′20″S 55°37′38″W
- Cerro Chapeu 31°34′1″S 55°38′10″W
