= Arrivillaga =

- Village
- Location in Uruguay
- Coordinates: 34°25′0″S 57°28′9″W
- Country: Uruguay
- Department: Colonia Department

Population (2011)
  - Total: 112
- Time zone: UTC -3
- Postal code: 70001
- Dial plan: +598 4586 (+4 digits)

Arrivillaga are two blocks with about 25 houses located 800 metres west of Juan Lacaze of Colonia Department, Uruguay.

== Geography ==
The village belongs to the sector 14, an administrative subdivision of the Colonia Department. The stream Arroyo Sauce lies near Arrivillaga.

== Population ==
According to the 2011 census, Arrivillaga had a population of 112.

Year	Population
1985	-
1996	51
2004	76
2011	112

Source: Instituto Nacional de Estadística de UruguaySource: Instituto Nacional de Estadística de Uruguay
