= Agraciada =

- Village
- Location within Uruguay
- Coordinates: 33°48′35″S 58°16′2″W
- Country: Uruguay
- Department: Soriano Department & Colonia Department

Population (2011)
  - Total: 586
- Time zone: UTC -3
- Postal code: 70102
- Dial plan: +598 4544 (+4 digits)

Agraciada is a village located in southwestern Uruguay, on the border of Soriano Department with Colonia Department with parts in both departments.

== History ==
On 28 June 1939 the status of the populated nucleus here was elevated to "Pueblo" (village) by the Act of Ley Nº 9.839.

== Population ==
According to the 2011 census, the town had a population of 586, of which 394 in the Soriano Department and 192 in the Colonia Department.

| Year | Population |
|---|---|
| 1908 | 2,133 |
| 1963 | 578 |
| 1975 | 638 |
| 1985 | 563 |
| 1996 | 598 |
| 2004 | 609 |
| 2011 | 586 |

Source: Instituto Nacional de Estadística de Uruguay
