= Santa Regina, Colonia =

Santa Regina
- Resort
- Location in Uruguay
- Coordinates: 34°26′5″S 57°11′45″W
- Country: Uruguay
- Department: Colonia Department

Population (2011)
  - Total: 52
- Time zone: UTC -3

Santa Regina is a resort village on the coast of Río de la Plata in the Colonia Department of Uruguay, near Brisas del Plata.

== Population ==
In 2011, Santa Regina had a population of 52 permanent inhabitants. In spite of its low population number, it has many houses that are used during summer.

Year	Population
1963	29
1975	40
1985	27
1996	14
2004	19
2011	52

Source: Instituto Nacional de Estadística de Uruguay
