= Paso Hospital =

- Village
- Location in Uruguay
- Coordinates: 31°41′S 54°39′W
- Country: Uruguay
- Department: Rivera Department

Population (2011)
  - Total: 295
- Time zone: UTC -3
- Postal code: 40003
- Dial plan: +598 4654 (+4 digits)

Paso Hospital or Hospital is a village in the Rivera Department of northeastern Uruguay.

== Population ==
In 2011 Paso Hospital had a population of 295.

| Year | Population |
|---|---|
| 2004 | 293 |
| 2011 | 295 |

Source: Instituto Nacional de Estadística de Uruguay
