= Cuaró =

- Hamlet
- Location in Uruguay
- Coordinates: 30°36′43″S 56°54′20″W
- Country: Uruguay
- Department: Artigas Department

Population (2011)
  - Total: 113
- Time zone: UTC -3
- Postal code: 55003
- Dial plan: +598 477 (+5 digits)

Cuaró is a caserío (hamlet) in the sparsely populated central Artigas Department of northern Uruguay.

== Geography ==
It is located about 23 kilometres (14 mi) northwest of Paso Campamento and about 23 kilometres (14 mi) southwest of Javier de Viana.

== Population ==
In 2011 Cuaró had a population of 113.

Year	Population
1996	114
2004	116
2011	113

Source: Instituto Nacional de Estadística de Uruguay
