= El Eucaliptus =

- Hamlet
- Location in Uruguay
- Coordinates: 31°54′0″S 57°16′0″W
- Country: Uruguay
- Department: Paysandú Department

Population (2011)
  - Total: 197
- Time zone: UTC -3
- Postal code: 60017
- Dial plan: +598 474 (+5 digits)

El Eucaliptus is a caserío (hamlet) in the centre of Paysandú Department, in western Uruguay.

== Geography ==
It is located on Route 26, about 100 kilometres (62 mi) northeast of the city of Paysandú.

== Population ==
In 2011 El Eucaliptus had a population of 197.

Year	Population
1963	145
1975	235
1985	176
1996	214
2004	401
2011	197

Source: Instituto Nacional de Estadística de Uruguay
