= 19 de Abril =

- Location in Uruguay
- Coordinates: 34°21′54″S 54°4′2″W
- Country: Uruguay
- Department: Rocha Department
- Climate: Cfa

19 de Abril is a town in Rocha Department in Uruguay. 19 de Abril had 205 inhabitants in 2011.

Its name refers to the Thirty-Three Orientals, a group of revolutionaries who landed the Banda Oriental on April 19, 1825 and would later start the Cisplatine War.
