= Ituzaingó, Uruguay =

Ituzaingó
- Town
- Location in Uruguay
- Coordinates: 34°25′10″S 56°25′30″W
- Country: Uruguay
- Department: San José Department

Population (2011)
  - Total: 771
- Time zone: UTC -3
- Postal code: 80004
- Dial plan: +598 4348 (+4 digits)

Ituzaingó, or Itusaingó is a small town of San José Department of southern Uruguay.

== Geography ==
The town is located on Route 79, 2.5 kilometres (1.6 mi) north of Route 11, by the stream Arroyo de la Virgen. Just across the stream of it, is the town Veinticinco de Agosto of Florida Department, and 5 kilometres (3.1 mi) to its southeast is the city Santa Lucía of Canelones Department.

== History ==
It was declared a "Pueblo" (village) by Decree of 23 October 1875. On 15 October 1963, its status was elevated to "Villa" (town) by the Act of Ley Nº 13.167.

== Population ==
In 2011 Ituzaingó had a population of 771.

Year	Population
1963	708
1975	930
1985	734
1996	769
2004	740
2011	771

Source: Instituto Nacional de Estadística de Uruguay
