= Santa Ana, Colonia =

Seaside resort in Uruguay

Coordinates: 34.420°S 57.600°W

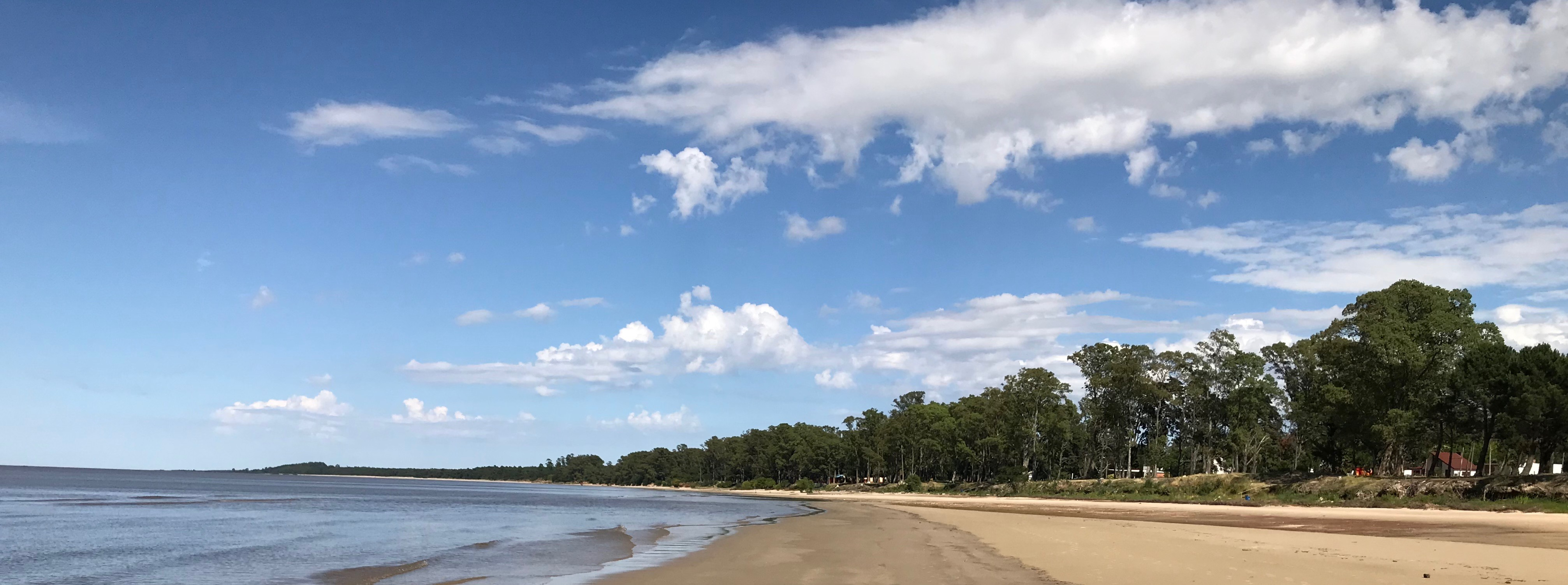
Beach of Santa Ana in the summer.

Santa Ana is a seaside resort in Colonia Department, Uruguay, near the capital city of Colonia del Sacramento.
