= La Pedrera, Gijón =

Coordinates: 43°29′11″N 5°42′01″W

La Pedrera
- Parish
- Interactive map of La Pedrera
- Country: Spain
- Autonomous community: Asturias
- Province: Asturias
- Municipality: Gijón

Population (2016)
  - Total: 748

La Pedrera is a parish of the municipality of Gijón / Xixón, in Asturias, Spain.

Its population was 660 in 2003 and 761 in 2012.

La pedrera borders the district of Ruedes in the south, Leorio / Llorio in the east and L'Abadía Cenero in the west.

== Villages and their neighbourhoods ==
Arroyo

- La Cotariella

Fontaciera

- Bilorteo
- El Picón

Mareo de Riba
La Pedrera

- La Campa
- La Casa los Cadaviecos
- La Fundigada
- La Iglesia
- La Iría
- Llareo
- La Llosica
- La Quinta los Condes
