= La Riviera, Uruguay =

La Riviera
- village
- Location within Uruguay
- Coordinates: 34°32′42″S 54°19′36″W
- Country: Uruguay
- Department: Rocha Department
- Elevation: 4 m (13 ft)

Population (2011)
  - Total: 30

La Riviera is a village in the Rocha Department of Uruguay.
