= La Pedrera, Rivera =

La Pedrera
- Hamlet
- Location in Uruguay
- Coordinates: 30°56′0″S 55°33′0″W
- Country: Uruguay
- Department: Rivera Department

Population (2011)
  - Total: 3,363
- Time zone: UTC -3
- Postal code: 40000
- Dial plan: +598 462 (+5 digits)

La Pedrera is a hamlet and southern suburb of Rivera in the Rivera Department of northeastern Uruguay. It is a peripheral area to the city of Rivera and, together with Mandubí, they form a southern extension of the city.

== Geography ==
The hamlet is located on the junction of Route 5 with Route 27.

== Population ==
In 2011 La Pedrera had a population of 3,363.

Year	Population
1985	1,394
1996	2,432
2004	2,887
2011	3,363

Source: Instituto Nacional de Estadística de Uruguay
