= Grecco =

- Village
- Location in Uruguay
- Coordinates: 32°48′55″S 57°2′45″W
- Country: Uruguay
- Department: Río Negro Department
- Elevation: 110 m (360 ft)

Population (2011)
  - Total: 598
- Time zone: UTC -3
- Dial plan: +598 4567 (+4 digits)

Grecco is a village in the Río Negro Department of Uruguay.

== Geography ==
The village is located 3 kilometres (1.9 mi) south of Route 20 and about 13 kilometres (8.1 mi) east of the junction of Route 20 with Route 4.

== History ==
Its status was elevated to "Pueblo" (village) on 17 November 1964 by the Act of Ley Nº 13.299. Previously, it had been the head of the judicial section "Las Flores".

== Population ==
In 2011 Grecco had a population of 598.

Year	Population
1908	612
1963	578
1975	457
1985	578
1996	554
2004	726
2011	598

Source: Instituto Nacional de Estadística de Uruguay
