= Reñaca =

Town of Viña del Mar, Chile

Coordinates: 32°58′10″S 71°32′42″W

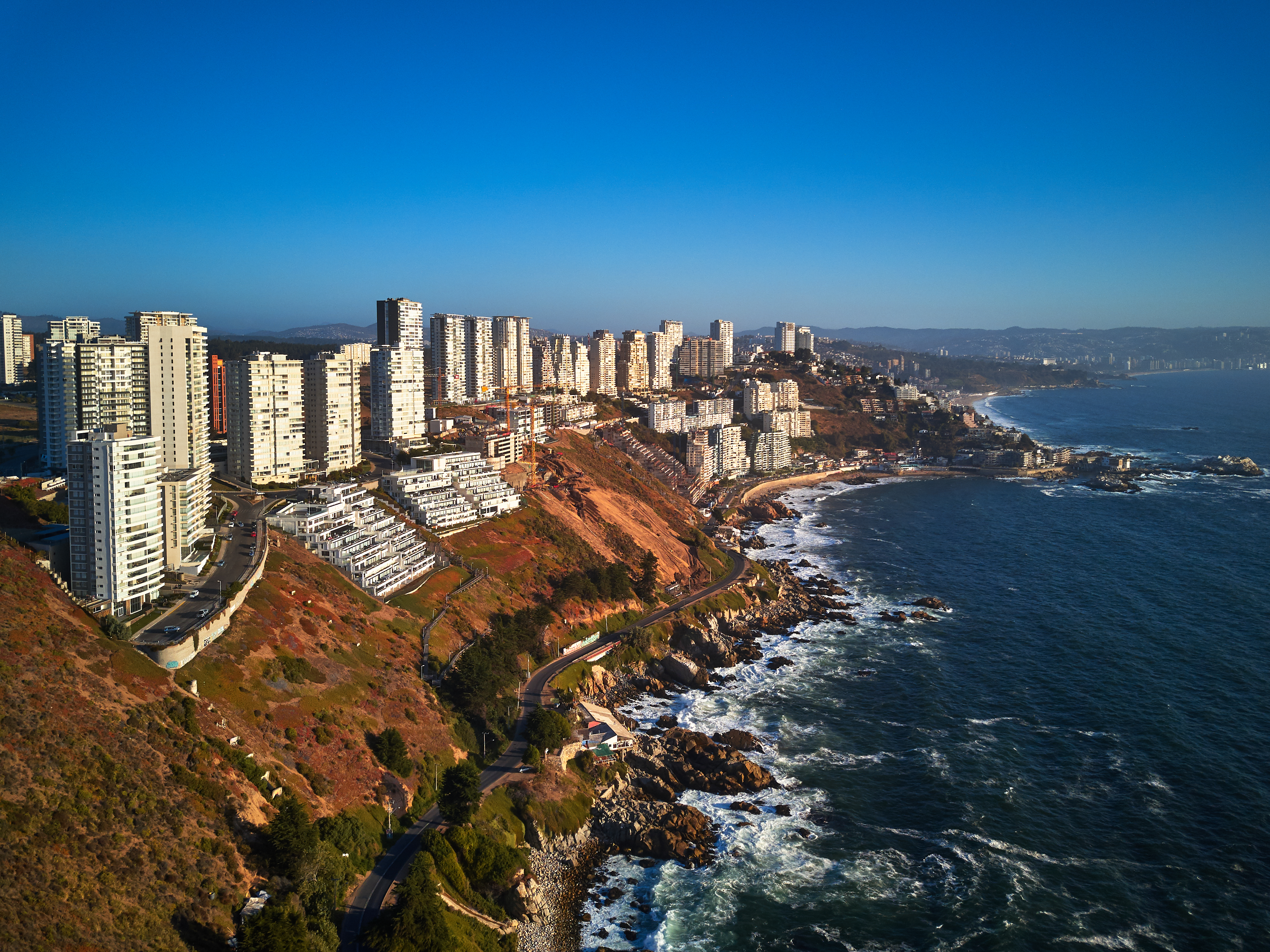
- View of Cochoa, in north of Reñaca
- Interactive map of Reñaca
- Country: Chile
- Region: Valparaíso
- Province: Valparaíso
- Commune: Viña del Mar

Population (2017 Census)
  - Total: 23,987

Sex
  - Men: 11,819
  - Women: 12,168
- Time zone: UTC-4 (Chilean Standard)
  - Summer (DST): UTC-3 (Chilean Daylight)
- Area code: Country + town = 56 + 32

Reñaca is a seaside town in the commune of Viña del Mar, Chile. The town is located along the coast in between the city of Viña del Mar and the city of Concón. Since the commune of Concón was created in 1995, Reñaca and Concón have effectively merged into one large urbanization, this led in 2021 to a public debate on whether it should be split from Viña del Mar to join it with Concón. As part of the urban growth of Reñaca toward Concón in the north, various coastal wetlands and dunes have been urbanized since 1994.

== Etymology ==
According to Rodrigo Moreno, who holds a PhD in the History of the Americas, the name came from indigenous people who settled there, and "Reñaca" was what Spanish ears understood. The meaning is uncertain, but it could mean "water well", probably referring to the estuary of the same name.
