= Puntas de Valdez =

Puntas de Valdéz
- Village
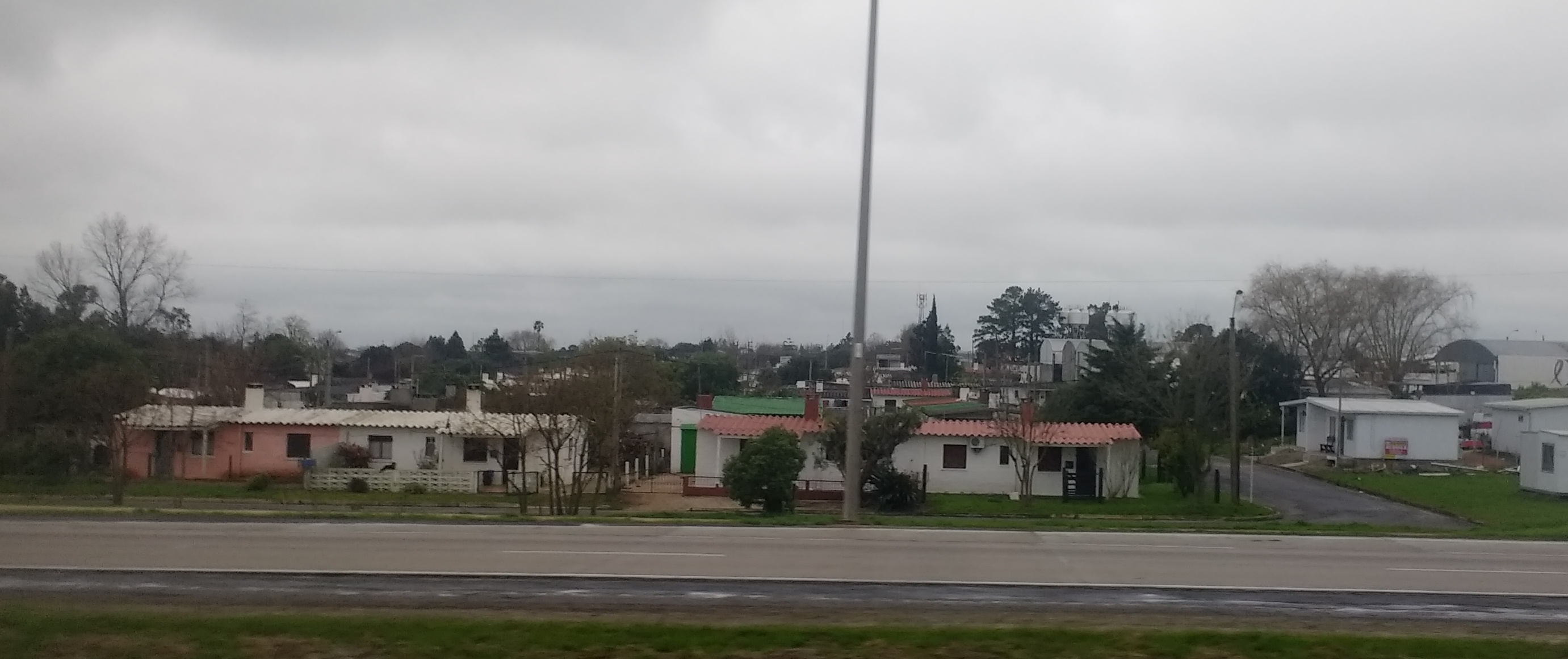

- Location in Uruguay
- Coordinates: 34°35′2″S 56°41′58″W
- Country: Uruguay
- Department: San José Department

Population (2011)
  - Total: 1,491
- Time zone: UTC -3
- Postal code: 80006
- Dial plan: +598 4345 (+4 digits)

Puntas de Valdéz is a village in the San José Department of southern Uruguay.

== Geography ==
The village is located on Route 1, about 7 kilometres (4.3 mi) west of its intersection with Route 45. Its distance from the centre of Montevideo is 61 kilometres (38 mi). The headwaters of Arroyo Valdez lie west of the village.

== History ==
On 14 November 1974, its status was elevated to "Pueblo" (village) by the Act of Ley Nº 14.296.

== Population ==
In 2011 Puntas de Valdéz had a population of 1,491.

Year	Population
1963	465
1975	591
1985	692
1996	1,036
2004	1,267
2011	1,491

Source: Instituto Nacional de Estadística de Uruguay
