= Fomento (resort) =

Fomento Playa Fomento
- Resort
- Location in Uruguay
- Coordinates: 34°26′5″S 57°15′15″W
- Country: Uruguay
- Department: Colonia Department

Population (2011)
  - Total: 84
- Time zone: UTC -3
- Postal code: 70201
- Dial plan: +598 4587 (+4 digits)

Fomento, or Playa Fomento, is a resort village on the coast of Río de la Plata in the Colonia Department of Uruguay.

== Geography ==
It is located on Route 51, 11 kilometres (6.8 mi) south of Colonia Valdense. It borders Playa Parant to the west and further west are Playa Britópolis and Blanca Arena, while Santa Regina lies to its east. All these resorts are situated along the same sandy beach.

== Population ==
In 2004, Fomento had a population of 84 permanent inhabitants and 177 dwellings. In spite of its low population number, it has many houses that are used during summer.

| Year | Population | Dwellings |
|---|---|---|
| 1963 | 29 | 30 |
| 1975 | 79 | 134 |
| 1985 | 105 | 123 |
| 1996 | 85 | 146 |
| 2004 | 51 | 153 |
| 2011 | 84 | 177 |

Source: Instituto Nacional de Estadística de Uruguay

== Places of interest ==
- Parque 17 de Febrero (17 February Park), belonging to the Waldensian Evangelical Church.
