= Campamento, Uruguay =

Paso Campamento
- Village
- Location in Uruguay
- Coordinates: 30°47′18″S 56°46′56″W
- Country: Uruguay
- Department: Artigas Department
- Time zone: UTC -3
- Postal code: 55007
- Dial plan: +598 477 (+5 digits)

Paso Campamento is a village in the Artigas Department of northern Uruguay.

== Location ==
It is located on Ruta 4, 50 kilometres (31 mi) southwest of the department capital Artigas.

== Population ==
According to the 2004 census, Paso Campamento had a population of 221 inhabitants.
