= Ciudad del Plata =

- City
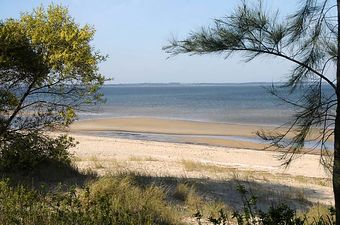

- Location in Uruguay
- Coordinates: 34°46′0″S 56°22′50″W
- Country: Uruguay
- Department: San José

Area
  - Total: 27.5 km^{2} (10.6 sq mi)
- Elevation: 5 m (16 ft)

Population (2023 Census)
  - Total: 38,249
  - Density: 1,390/km^{2} (3,600/sq mi)
- Time zone: UTC -3
- Postal code: 80500
- Dial plan: +598 2 (+7 digits)
- Website: www.ciudaddelplata.org

Ciudad del Plata is a city in San José Department of Uruguay.

== Geography ==
The city is bounded by the Santa Lucía River to the east and north and by the Río de la Plata to the south. Spanning the 23rd to the 39th km of Route 1 (also known as the "Brigadier General Manuel Oribe Highway"), Ciudad del Plata forms part of the conurbation of the capital Montevideo. Ciudad del Plata has an industrial core. The city is also known for the Jardines de Mater Terra, a private cemetery established in 1993.

== History ==
The whereabouts of Ciudad del Plata were formerly known as Rincón de la Bolsa. It was a group of independent fragments, which became integrated into one populated centre, as a result of the westward expansion of the metropolitan area of Montevideo.

According to the legislative decree Nº 18.052, "the area enclosed by the River Santa Lucia, the Rio de la Plata and kilometre 35 of National Route 1" received city status under the name "Ciudad del Plata" on 25 October 2006, "integrating the areas Delta del Tigre y Villas, Playa Pascual, Parque Postel, Monte Grande and Santa Monica".

== Population ==
In 2023, the census population was approximately 38,249 inhabitants. According to the 2011 census, Ciudad del Plata has a population of 31,145; at the 2023 Census this had grown to 38,249.

Year	Population
1963	3,854
1975	11,124
1985	13,512
1996	20,712
2004	26,582
2011	31,145
2023	38,249

Source: Instituto Nacional de Estadística de Uruguay

== Barrios ==
The names of the various barrios (neighbourhoods) composing Ciudad del Plata are: Delta del Tigre, Sofima, Villa Rives, San Fernando, Autódromo Nacional, San Fernando Chico, Parque del Plata, Monte Grande, Safici (Parque Postel), Las Violetas, Penino, Santa Mónica, Santa María, Santa Victoria, San Luis, Playa Pascual, Villa Olímpica.

The populations of the five censual districts up to the 2011 census were as follows:

Delta del Tigre y Villas

Year	Population
1963	3,474
1975	8,831
1985	9,618
1996	14,120
2004	17,457
2011	20,240

Playa Pascual

Year	Population
1963	380
1975	2,283
1985	3,797
1996	4,584
2004	5,653
2011	6,870

Santa Mónica

Year	Population
1963	-
1975	-
1985	745
1996	1,298
2004	1,440
2011	1,662

Monte Grande

Year	Population
1963	-
1975	-
1985	352
1996	710
2004	1,084
2011	1,287

Safici

Year	Population
1963	-
1975	-
1985	502
1996	656
2004	948
2011	1,087

Source: Instituto Nacional de Estadística de Uruguay

== Places of worship ==
- St. Joseph the Worker Parish Church (Roman Catholic)
- Delta del Tigre Parish Church (Roman Catholic)
- Iglesia de Jesucristo de los Santos de los Últimos Días
