= Arachania, Cerro Largo =

Arachania
- Village
- Location within Uruguay
- Coordinates: 32°31′42″S 54°7′58″W
- Country: Uruguay
- Department: Cerro Largo Department
- Elevation: 94 m (308 ft)

Population (2011)
  - Total: 20

Arachania is a village in the Cerro Largo Department of Uruguay.
