= Río Negro Department =

Department of Uruguay

Río Negro
- Department
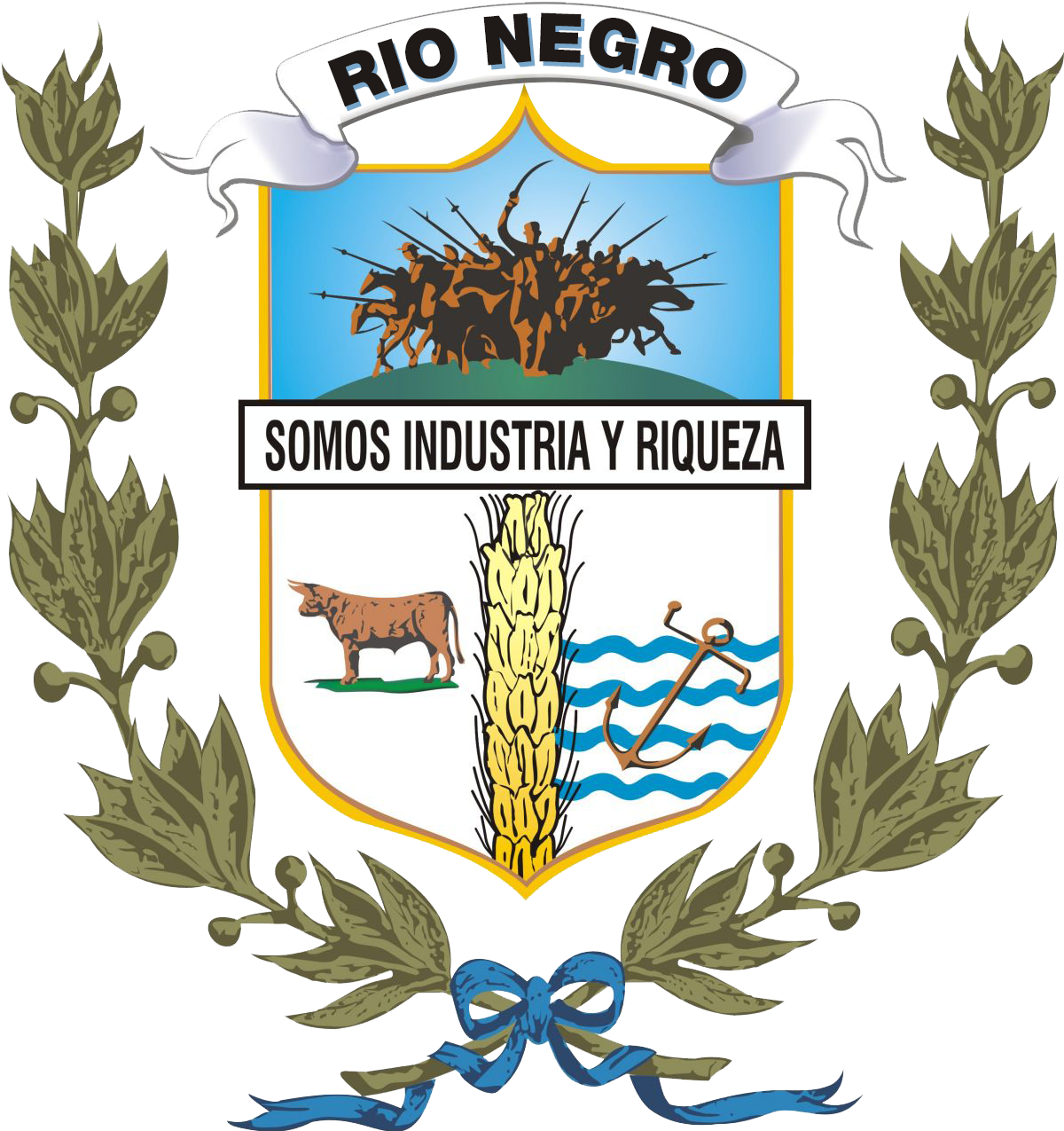
- Flag Coat of arms

- Location of Río Negro Department in Uruguay
- Coordinates (Fray Bentos): 33°8′S 58°18′W
- Country: Uruguay
- Inception: 1868
- Capital of Department: Fray Bentos

Government
  - Intendant: Omar Lafluf
  - Ruling party: Partido Nacional

Area
  - Total: 9,282 km^{2} (3,584 sq mi)
- Elevation: 70 m (230 ft)

Population (2023 census)
  - Total: 57,334
  - Density: 6.177/km^{2} (16.00/sq mi)
- Demonym: Rio negrense
- Time zone: UTC-3 (UYT)
- ISO 3166 code: UY-RN
- Website: www.rionegro.gub.uy

Río Negro Department (Spanish: Departamento de Río Negro, Spanish pronunciation: [ˈri.o ˈneɣɾo]) is a department of the northwestern region of Uruguay. It has an area of 9,282 km^{2} (3,584 sq mi) and a population of 57,334. Its capital is Fray Bentos. It borders Paysandú Department to the north, Tacuarembó Department to the east, Durazno Department to the southeast, Soriano Department to the south and has the Río Uruguay flowing at its west, separating it from Argentina.

== History ==
The first division of the Republic in six departments happened on 27 January 1816. Later in that year two more departments were formed. At the time, Paysandú Department included all the territory north of the Río Negro, which included the current departments of Artigas, Rivera, Tacuarembó, Salto, Paysandú and Río Negro. On 17 June 1837 a new division of Uruguay was made and this territory was divided in three parts. In the new division, Paysandú Department also included the current department of Río Negro, until it was split from it in 1868.

== Geography ==
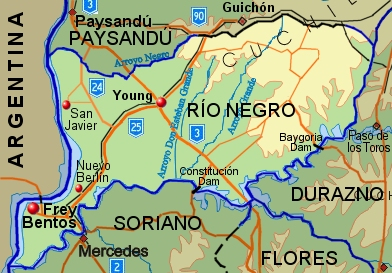
Topographic map of Río Negro Department showing main populated places and roads

The Río Negro flows along the southern border of the department, forming the natural border with the departments of Durazno to the southeast and Soriano to the south. Tributary streams (arroyos) to the Río Negro, flow through most of the department. From east to west, these are: Arroyo Salsipuedes Grande, which forms part of the border with Tacuarembó Department to the east, while its tributary Arroyo Juan Tomas forms a little part of the northeast border with Paysandú Department, Arroyo Tres Árboles with its tributary Arroyo Islas de Argüelles, Arroyo Rolón, Arroyo Grande, with its tributaries Arroyo de las Flores and Arroyo Averías Grande, Arroyo Don Esteban Grande, Arroyo Sanchez Grande, with its tributaries Arroyo Sanchez Chico and Arroyo Coladeras.

The Río Negro discharges into Río Uruguay about 32 kilometres (20 mi) southwest of Fray Bentos. Notable along its course in respect to this department are two hydroelectric dams: the Rincón de Baygorria Dam, forming the Baygorria Reservoir and the Constitución Dam (also known as Palmar Dam), forming the Paso de Palmar Reservoir. In both cases, the power installations are situated on the neighbouring departments of Durazno and Soriano respectively.

A big part of the north border with Paysandú Department is formed by Arroyo Negro with two of its tributary streams flowing through the northwest of the department. These are: Arroyo Gutiérez Grande and Arroyo Bellaco. It discharges into Río Uruguay about 21 kilometres (13 mi) north of San Javier and opposite the city of Argentina Concepción del Uruguay, forming at its mouth a sandy beach named Playa Arroyo Negro. There is also Arroyo Romàn Grande, which discharges directly into Río Uruguay. Several sandy islands are formed in the curve of Río Uruguay upstream of Fray Bentos between Uruguay and Argentina.

On the northeast part of the department starts the big hill range Cuchilla de Haedo, which extends to the northeast forming its highest levels between the departments of Salto and Rivera. The hill Cerro del Quebracho is part of this range. The second and smaller hill range, in the west part of the department, is the Cuchilla de Navarro. Independent of these ranges, the hill Cerro Pelado is in the middle south, and the hills Cerro Colorado and Cerro Malvenir are southeast of Fray Bentos.

== Demographics ==
Ethnic groups in Río Negro (2023 est.)
Ethnic groups	Percent
White	83.0%
Black	8.5%
Indigenous	5.1%
Asian	0.6%
None/Other/Unspecified	9.5%

As of the census of 2011, Río Negro Department had a population of 54,765 (27,576 male and 27,189 female) and 20,975 households.

Demographic data for Río Negro Department in 2010:

- Population growth rate: 0.529%
- Birth Rate: 15.82 births/1,000 people
- Death Rate: 7.38 deaths/1,000 people
- Average age: 31.5 (31.3 Males, 31.6 Females)
- Life Expectancy at Birth:
  - Total population: 78.04 years
  - Male: 74.78 years
  - Female: 81.05 years
- Average per household income: 25,585 pesos/month
- Urban per capita income: 9,137 pesos/month

2010 Data Source:

Main Urban Centres
Other towns and villages
Population stated according to the 2011 census.

City / Town	Population
Fray Bentos	22,406
Young	16,756
Nuevo Berlín	2,450
San Javier	1,781

Town / Village	Population
Barrio Anglo	785
Algorta	779
Grecco	598
Colonia Ofir	S/D

Rural population

According to the 2011 census, Río Negro department has an additional rural population of 5,212.

== Economy ==
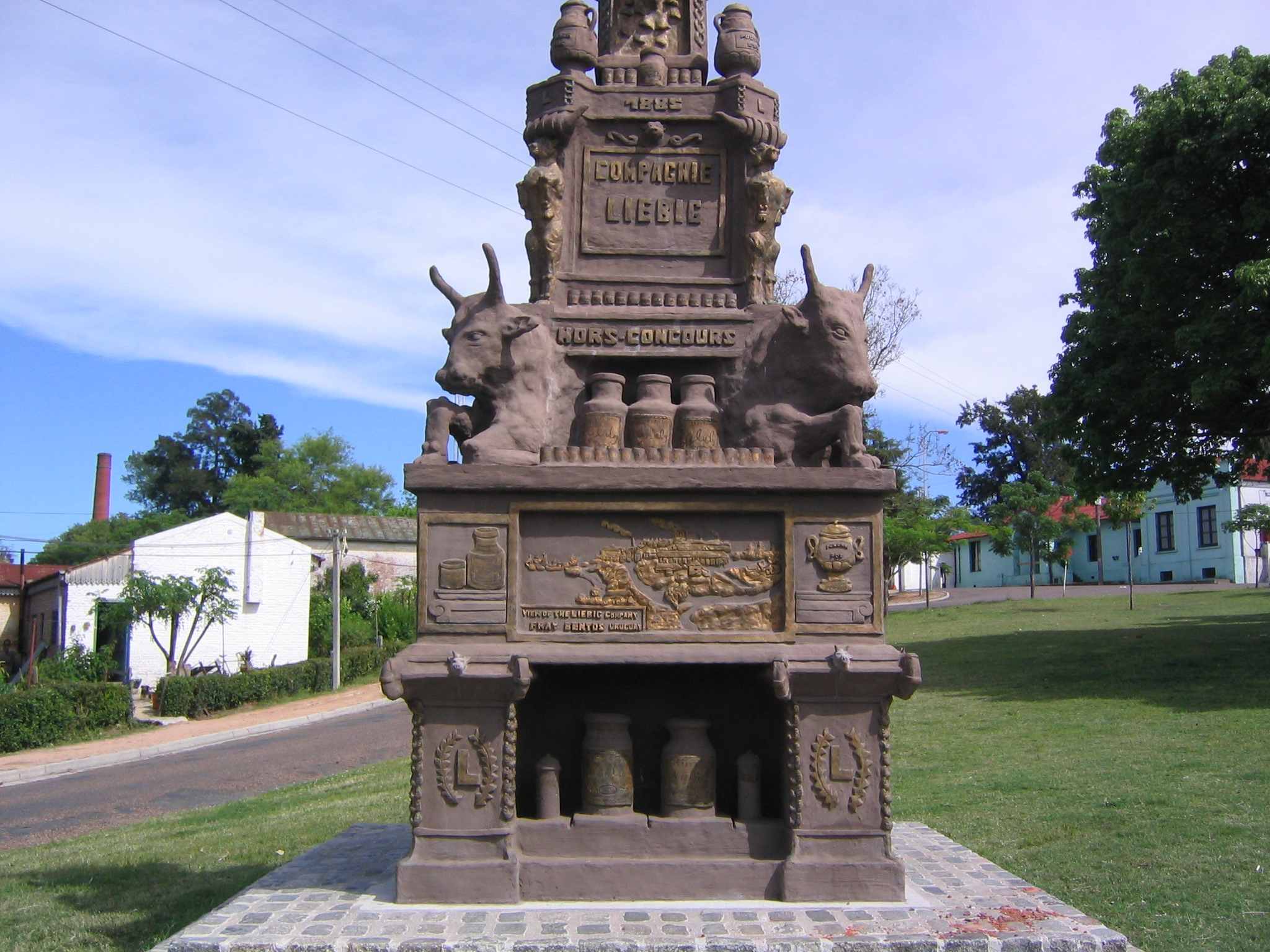
Statue to a Fray Bentos meat company of the past

Agriculture is the main source of industry in the western part of the department. The main agricultural products are flax, sunflower, wheat, maize, grains, grapes, amongst others. The eastern half of the department has many pastures for the grazing of sheep and cattle which are an important contributor to the economy of the department. The main industries are again based around agro-industry the most prominent being wineries and dairies. The department also has a fluvial port located in Fray Bentos.

Tourism is becoming popular in the department especially in the thermal spas around the area of Las Cañas.

=== Botnia ===
Botnia S.A., a subsidiary of Finnish corporation Botnia, is currently building a large cellulose factory in Fray Bentos to produce bleached eucalyptus pulp. The investment in the project is about 1 billion USD and the factory will directly or indirectly employ more than 8,000 people. The project, however, is not without opponents. On 30 April 2005 about 40,000 Argentinians from Entre Ríos, along with environmental groups from both countries, blocked an international bridge and demanded the Argentine government to intercede before the Uruguayan one to stop the building of the factory, claiming it will gravely pollute the Uruguay River. On 20 December 2005 a World Bank study concluded that the factory would not have a negative impact on the environment or tourism in either country, however, this was not accepted by the environmental groups, who blocked again the bridge (partially blocking the bridge near Paysandu, as well) several times near the end of 2005.

== Notable people ==
- Guillermo Stirling (1937- ) was the Colorado Party's presidential candidate in 2005
- Gaston Ramirez (Fray Bentos, December 2, 1990) football player for Southampton F.C
- Vladimir Roslik, a Russian-Uruguayan medical doctor tortured and later killed by the Uruguayan military during their regime (1973–1984)

== See also ==
- List of populated places in Uruguay#Río Negro Department
- Cellulose plant conflict between Argentina and Uruguay
