= Rivera Department =

Department of Uruguay

Rivera
- Department
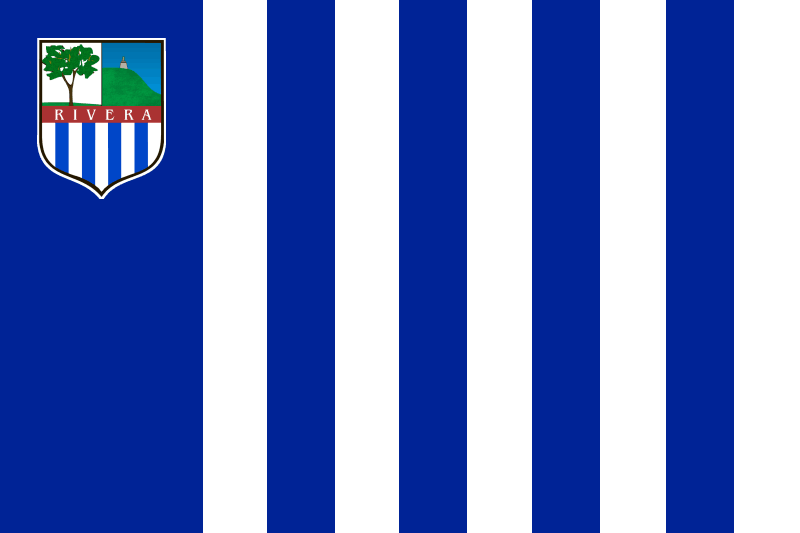
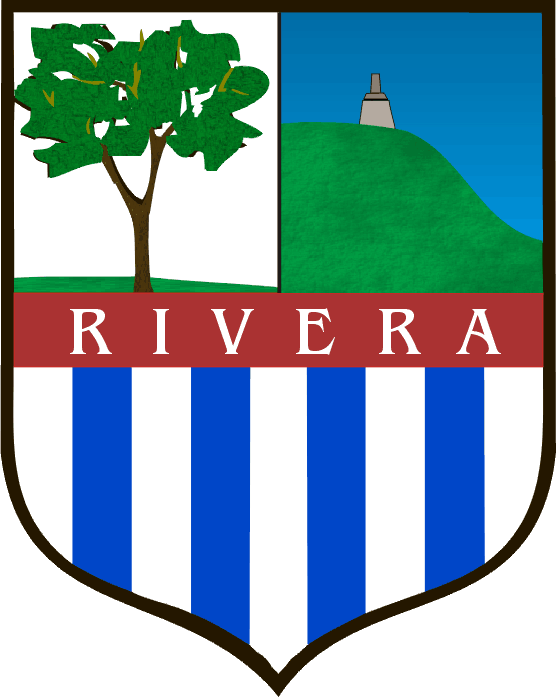
- Flag Coat of arms

- Location of Rivera Department in Uruguay
- Coordinates (Rivera): 30°54′S 55°33′W
- Country: Uruguay
- Inception: 1884
- Capital of Department: Rivera

Government
  - Intendant: Richard Sander
  - Ruling party: Partido Colorado

Area
  - Total: 9,370 km^{2} (3,620 sq mi)
- Elevation: 152 m (499 ft)

Population (2023 census)
  - Total: 109,300
  - Density: 11.7/km^{2} (30.2/sq mi)
- Demonym: Riverense
- Time zone: UTC-3 (UYT)
- Area code: 462
- ISO 3166 code: UY-RV
- Website: rivera.gub.uy

Rivera Department (Spanish pronunciation: [riˈβeɾa]) is a department of the northern region of Uruguay. It has an area of 9,370 km^{2} (3,620 sq mi) and a population of 109,300. Its capital is the city of Rivera. It borders Brazil to the north and east, Cerro Largo Department to the southeast, Tacuarembó Department to the south and west and Salto Department to the northwest.

== History ==
The first division of the Republic in six departments happened in 1816. Two more departments were formed later that year. At that time, Paysandú Department included all the territory north of the Río Negro, which included the present-day departments of Artigas, Rivera, Tacuarembó, Salto, Paysandú and Río Negro. On 17 June 1837 a new division of Uruguay was made and this territory was divided in three parts. In the new division, the Tacuarembó Department included also the present department of Rivera, until it was split from it in 1884.

On 7 May 1862 the village Pueblo de Ceballos was created, in honour of the Spanish viceroy Pedro de Cevallos. In July 1867 it took on the official name "Rivera". The Brazilian town Santana do Livramento already existed just across the border. On 1 October 1884, it became capital of the newly formed Department of Rivera by the Act of Ley Nº 1.757.

== Geography ==
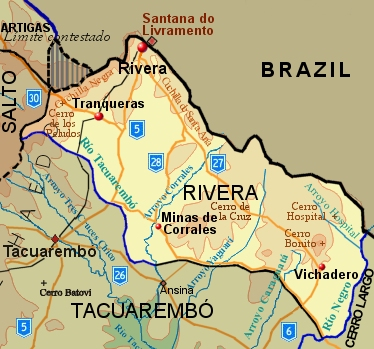
Topographic map of Rivera Department showing main populated places and roads

Along the eastern borders of the department with Cerro Largo Department flows Río Negro, with its tributaries flowing through the easternmost part of the department. From north to south, these are: Arroyo San Luis, which forms part of its border with Brazil, Arroyo del Hospital with its tributary Arroyo Blanco and Arroyo Ceibal.

The western part of its southern border with Tacuarembó Department is formed by Río Tacuarembó, with its tributaries flowing through most of the department. From west to east, these are: Arroyo Rubio Chico, Arroyo Laureles which also forms part of the southern border of the department, Arroyo Cuñapirú with its tributaries Arroyo Batoví, Arroyo Mangueras, Arroyo de los Médanos, Arroyo Corrales and Arroyo Zapucay, Arroyo Yaguarí with its tributary Arroyo Carpintería, and Arroyo Caraguatá with its tributary Arroyo Coronilla.

At the northwest end of the department reaches the hill range Cuchilla de Haedo from the south turning into the Cuchilla Negra hill range, with the hill Cerro de los Peludos between them. Along the borders with Brazil, to the north, runs the hill range Cuchilla de Santa Ana. In the middle of the department is the hill Cerro de la Cruz, while on its eastern end are the hills Cerro del Hospital and Cerro Bonito.

== Demographics ==
Ethnic groups in Rivera (2023 est.)
Ethnic groups	Percent
White	77.1%
Black	21.0%
Indigenous	7.1%
Asian	0.8%
None/Other/Unspecified	5.6%

As of the census of 2011, Rivera Department has a population of 103,493 (50.397 male and 53.096 female) and 39,859 households.

Demographic data for Rivera Department in 2010:

- Population growth rate: 0.610%
- Birth Rate: 16.45 births/1,000 people
- Death Rate: 7.80 deaths/1,000 people
- Average age: 30.8 (28.9 male, 32.4 female)
- Life Expectancy at Birth:
  - Total population: 76.12 years
  - Male: 72.85 years
  - Female: 79.89 years
- Average per household income: 22,084 pesos/month
- Urban per capita income: 8,806 pesos/month

2010 Data Source:

Main Urban Centres
Other towns and villages
Population numbers as per 2011 census.

City / Town	Population
Rivera	64,465
Tranqueras	7,235
Mandubí	6,019
Minas de Corrales	3,788
Vichadero	3,698
La Pedrera	3,363
Santa Teresa	2,657
Lagunón	2,376

Town / Village	Population
Las Flores	359
Lapuente	321
Paso Hospital	295
Lagos del Norte	291
Masoller	240

Rural population
According to the 2011 census, Rivera department has an additional rural population of 7,602.

== Transportation ==
Route 5 joins Rivera, the capital of the department in the northwest, with Tranqueras and then with all the capitals of the departments to its south, Tacuarembó, Durazno, Florida and Canelones, reaching Montevideo from the west. Route 6 joins Vichadero, in the southeast of the department, with some important cities of the same departments to the south, including Sarandí del Yí and San Ramón, reaching Montevideo from the north. Between Rivera and Vichadero runs Route 27, while Route 30 joins Tranqueras with the city of Artigas to the northwest. Route 44, which marks part of the southern border of the department, connects with Melo to the southeast. Routes 28 and 29 connect the town Minas de Corrales with the other main Routes of the department.

The railroad track Montevideo-Rivera is active for cargo trains of the Línea Rivera, which connects with the railroad infrastructure of Brazil. A small length of this track, from Montevideo to Florida only, is also active for passenger trains.

The small airport of the city of Rivera receives light aircraft and an irregular service by a Brazilian airline to Porto Alegre.

== Visitors attractions ==
- Parque Internacional between Brazil and Uruguay in the city of Rivera.
- Minas de Corrales a town established in 1879, during the Gold Rush times.
- Rincón de Tres Cerros near the border with Tacuarembó Department, approx. 15 kilometres (9.3 mi) west of Minas de Corrales.
- Valle del Lunarejo running parallel to Route 30, between Masoller and Tranqueras.

== See also ==
- List of populated places in Uruguay § Rivera Department

== Bibliography ==
- Domínguez, Carlos María (2004). El norte profundo (in Spanish). Montevideo: Ediciones de la Banda Oriental.
