= Tacuarembó River =

Coordinates: 31°13′48″S 55°45′58″W

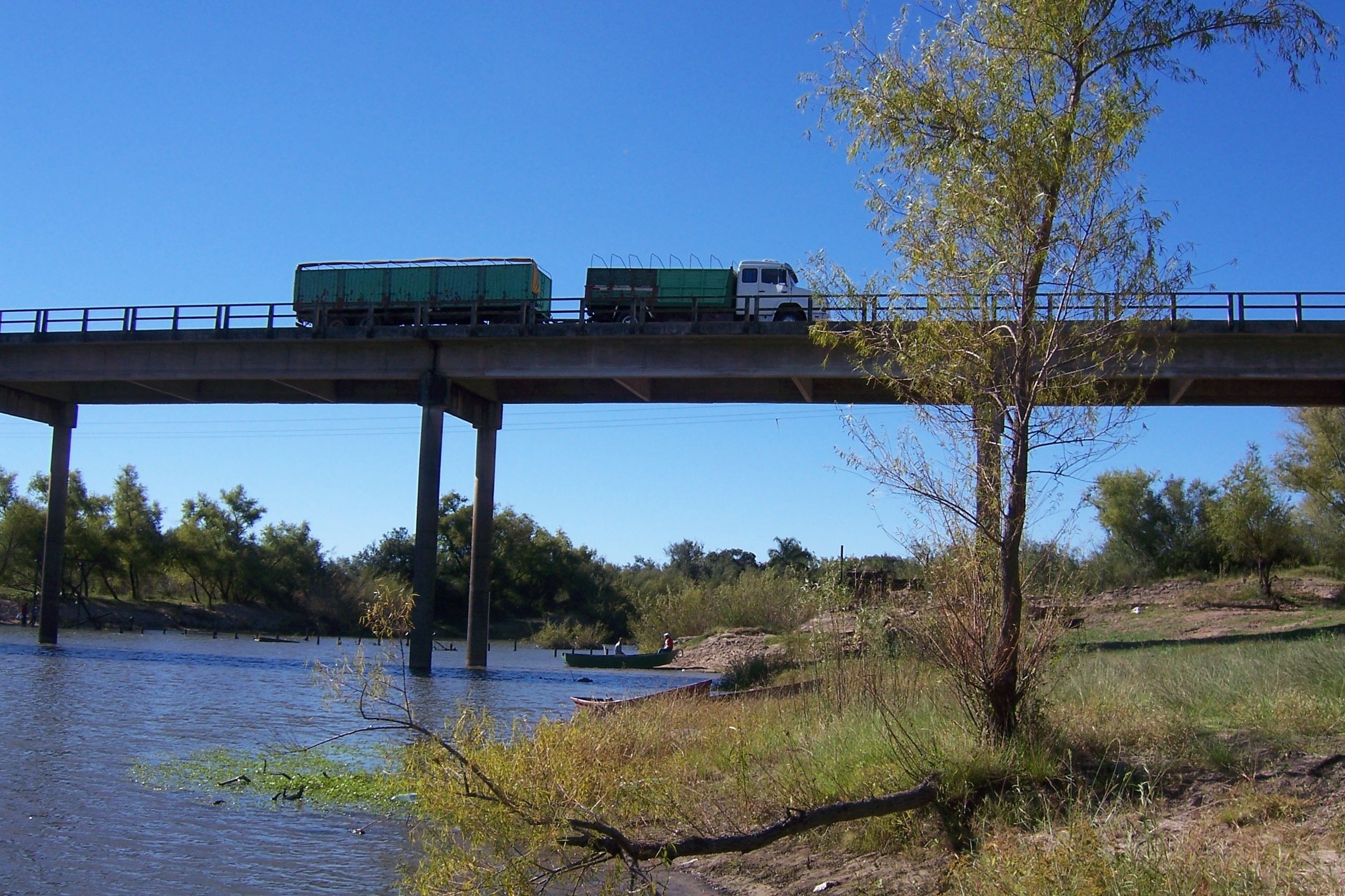

Location
- Country: Uruguay

Physical characteristics
- Source
  - location: near Rivera, Uruguay
- Mouth
  - location: Río Negro (Uruguay)
- Length: 260 km (160 mi)

The Tacuarembó River is a river in Uruguay. The Tacuarembó and the Yí Rivers are the principal tributaries of the Río Negro.

Among the tributaries of the Tacuarembó River are included the Caraguatá River.

== See also ==
- List of rivers of Uruguay
