= San José Department =

Department of Uruguay

San José
- Department
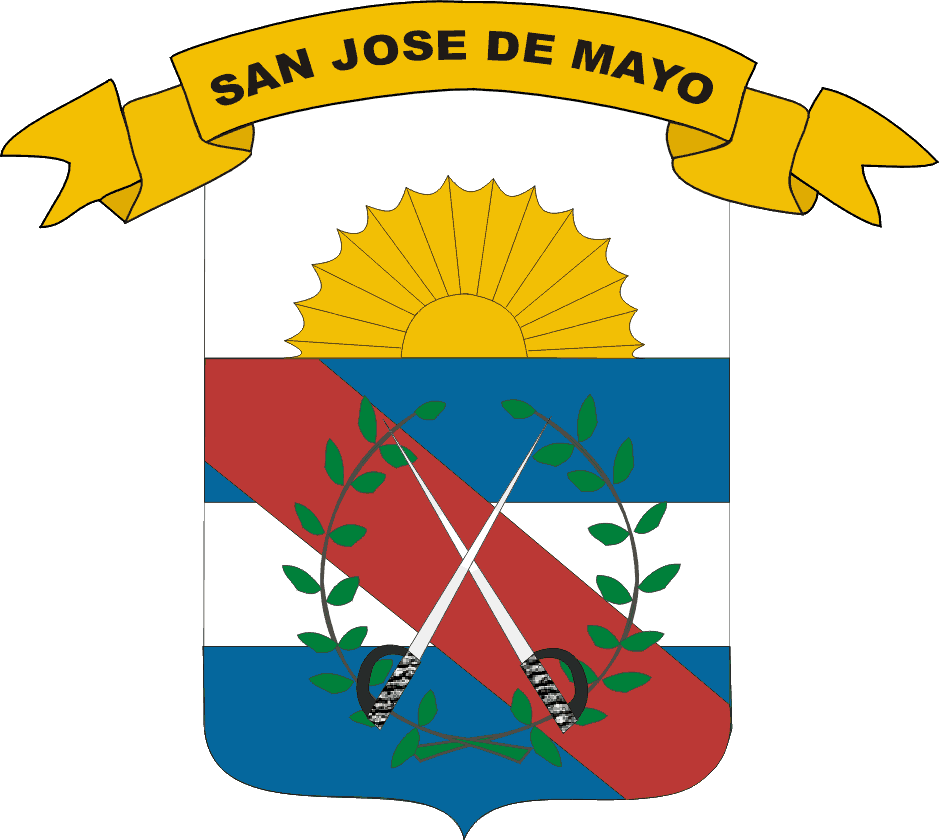
- Flag Coat of arms

- Location of San José Department in Uruguay
- Coordinates (San José de Mayo): 34°20′S 56°43′W
- Country: Uruguay
- Established: 1816
- Capital of Department: San José de Mayo

Government
  - Intendant: Ana Bentaberri
  - Ruling party: National Party

Area
  - Total: 4,992 km^{2} (1,927 sq mi)
- Elevation: 48 m (157 ft)

Population (2023 census)
  - Total: 119,714
  - Density: 23.98/km^{2} (62.11/sq mi)
- Demonym(s): Josefino-a, Maragato-a
- Time zone: UTC-3 (UYT)
- Area code: 434
- ISO 3166 code: UY-SJ
- Website: imsj.gub.uy

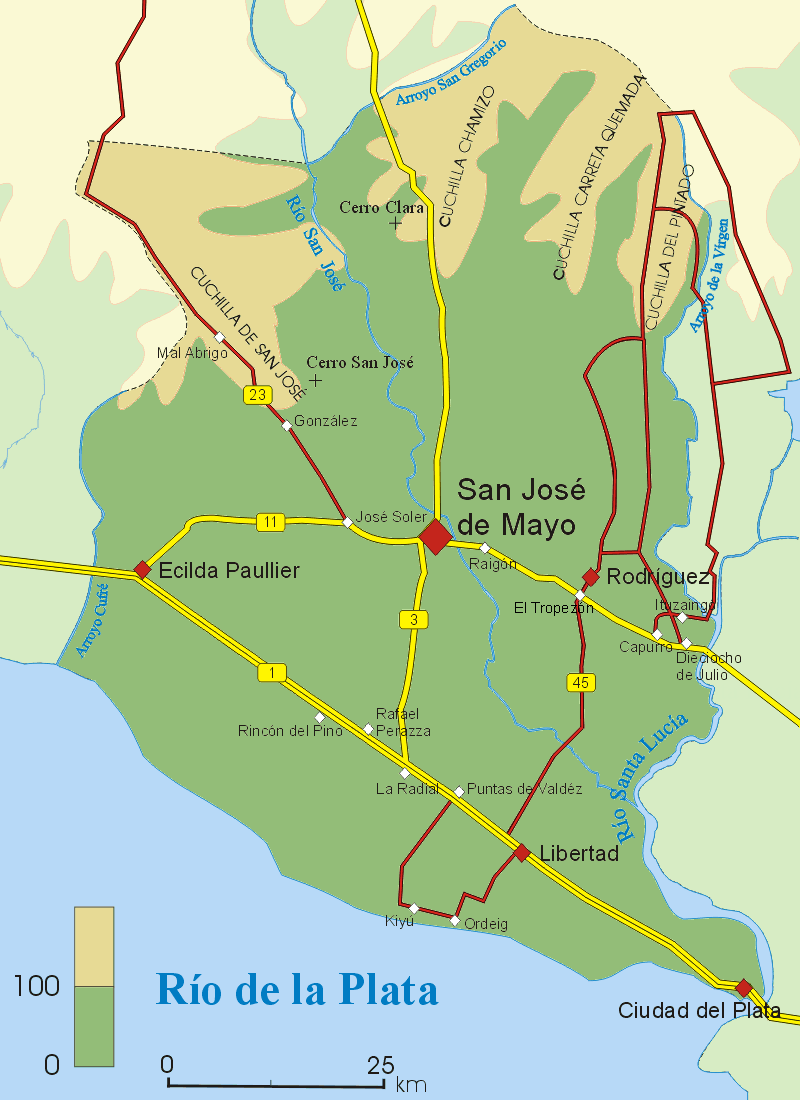
Map of San José Department

San José Department (Spanish pronunciation: [saŋ xoˈse]) is a department of Uruguay. Its capital is San José de Mayo. It borders Colonia Department to the west, Flores Department to the north and the departments of Florida, Canelones and Montevideo to the east. Its southern limits are described by its coastline on Rio de la Plata.

== Demographics ==
Ethnic groups in San José (2011 est.)
Ethnic groups	Percent
White	93.0%
Black	5.5%
Indigenous	3.7%
Asian	0.4%
None/Other/Unspecified	3.1%

As of the 2023 census, San José had a population of 119,718, an 8,5% increase from 2011's 110,323 figure. An increase was observed in ages above 40, while younger ages experienced significant decline. This is consistent with the intercensal evolution of births versus deaths, with deaths surpassing births in 2019.

The largest urban centres in the department are San José de Mayo and Ciudad del Plata, with 38,533 and 38,249 inhabitants respectively. An estimated 11,613 live in rural areas.

87.3% of households have access to drinking water provided by OSE. Although this is an increase compared to previous periods, San José remains the department with the least percentage of household's connected to the general network. If access to drinking water through semi-surgent wells, a common practice in rural areas, is included, this figure rises to 97.4%.

In 2023, access to the Internet in San José was of 75%, a more than double increase compared to the previous census.

Demographic data for San José Department in 2010:

- Population growth rate: 0.941%
- Birth rate: 14.60 births/1,000 people
- Death rate: 8.44 deaths/1,000 people
- Average age: 33.2 (32.1 male, 34.2 female)
- Life expectancy at birth:
  - Total population: 77.72 years
  - Male: 73.90 years
  - Female: 81.61 years
- Average per household income: 24,747 pesos/month
- Urban per capita income: 9,928 pesos/month

2010 Data Source:

=== Main urban centres ===
Population stated as per 2023 census.

City / Town	Male Population	Female Population	Total Population
San José de Mayo	18,419	20,114	38,533
Ciudad del Plata	18,742	19,507	38,249
Libertad	6,732	6,239	12,971
Ecilda Paullier	1,556	1,625	3,181
Rodríguez	1,466	1,634	3,100
Puntas de Valdez	798	820	1,618
Rafael Perazza	745	772	1,517
Juan Soler	623	425	1,048
Kiyú - Ordeig	457	440	897
Ituzaingó	438	439	877

== See also ==
- List of populated places in Uruguay#San José Department
