= Departments of Uruguay =

Department Departamento (Spanish)
- Category: Unitary state
- Location: Oriental Republic of Uruguay
- Number: 19 departments
- Subdivisions: Municipalities

Uruguay consists of 19 departments (departamentos). Each department has a legislature, called a Departmental Board, and a chief executive called an Intendente.

== History ==
The first division of Uruguay into six departments occurred on 27 January 1816. In February of the same year, two more departments were formed, and in 1828 one more was added. When the country's first constitution was signed in 1830, there were nine departments: Montevideo, Maldonado, Canelones, San José, Colonia, Soriano, Paysandú, Durazno and Cerro Largo. At that time, the department of Paysandú occupied all the territory north of the Río Negro, which included the current departments of Artigas, Rivera, Tacuarembó, Salto, Paysandú and Río Negro.

On 17 June 1837, this northern territory was divided in three, by the creation of the departments of Salto and Tacuarembó. At the same time, the department of Minas (which was eventually renamed to Lavalleja) was created out of parts of Cerro Largo and Maldonado. In 1856 Florida was created, and on 7 July 1880 the department of Río Negro was split from Paysandú and Rocha was split from Maldonado. In 1884, Treinta y Tres was formed from parts of Cerro Largo and Minas, while Artigas was split from Salto. The same year the department of Rivera was split from Tacuarembó, and in 1885 Flores was split from San José.

1830

1837

1856

1880

1884-85

Series of maps showing the gradual formation of the current 19 departments of Uruguay.

== List of departments ==
Flag or COA	Department	ISO 3166-2 code	Formation	Area (km^{2})	Population (2023)	Density (/km^{2})	Capital	Capital population
Artigas Department	Artigas	UY-AR	1884 (from Salto)	11,928	77,487	6.15	Artigas	40,658
Canelones Department	Canelones	UY-CA	1816 (as Villa de Guadalupe)	4,536	608,956	114.68	Canelones	19,865
Cerro Largo Department	Cerro Largo	UY-CL	1821	13,648	91,025	6.21	Melo	53,245
Colonia Department	Colonia	UY-CO	1816	6,106	135,797	20.18	Colonia del Sacramento	26,231
Durazno Department	Durazno	UY-DU	1822 (as Entre Ríos Yí y Negro)	11,643	62,011	4.90	Durazno	34,372
Flores Department	Flores	UY-FS	1885 (from San José)	5,144	26,271	4.87	Trinidad	21,429
Florida Department	Florida	UY-FD	1856 (from San José)	10,417	70,325	6.44	Florida	33,640
Lavalleja Department	Lavalleja	UY-LA	1837 (as Minas)	10,016	59,175	5.87	Minas	45,638
Maldonado Department	Maldonado	UY-MA	1816 (as San Fernando de Maldonado)	4,793	212,951	34.28	Maldonado	62,592
	Montevideo	UY-MO	1816	530	1,302,954	2,489	Montevideo	1,319,108
Paysandú Department	Paysandú	UY-PA	1820	13,922	121,843	8.13	Paysandú	76,429
Rio Negro Department	Río Negro	UY-RN	1868 (from Paysandú)	9,282	57,334	5.90	Fray Bentos	24,406
Rivera Department	Rivera	UY-RV	1884 (as Tacuarembó)	9,370	109,300	11.04	Rivera	64,465
Rocha Department	Rocha	UY-RO	1880 (from Maldonado)	10,551	80,707	6.45	Rocha	25,422
Salto Department	Salto	UY-SA	1837 (from Paysandú)	14,163	136,197	8.82	Salto	104,028
San José Department	San José	UY-SJ	1816	4,992	119,714	21.70	San José de Mayo	36,747
Soriano Department	Soriano	UY-SO	1816 (as Santo Domingo Soriano)	9,008	83,685	9.17	Mercedes	41,975
	Tacuarembó	UY-TA	1837 (from Paysandú)	15,438	96,013	5.83	Tacuarembó	54,757
Treinta y Tres Department	Treinta y Tres	UY-TT	1884 (from Cerro Largo and Lavalleja)	9,529	47,706	4.97	Treinta y Tres	25,477

== Statutory framework ==
=== Establishment of departments ===
The General Assembly has the powers to create new departments, requiring a supermajority vote of two thirds in both chambers, as provided by the Constitution in article 85. The General Assembly can also define their borders, requiring the same majority.

=== Politics and governance ===
The basic statutory framework of departments is defined by Section XVI of the Constitution. Each department has executive and legislative branches, in the form of the Intendant and the Departmental Board respectively. The Municipal Organic Law No. 9515 regulates more specific details of these rules. The office of Intendant was created in 1908.

=== Finances ===
The sources of financial resources of the departmental governments are detailed in article 297 of the Constitution, being the departmental taxes, national taxes whose administration is granted to departments, earnings from services or incomes, money obtained from sanctions, donations, inheritances and bequests received and accepted, and their own part of the national budget that they were granted by budget laws.

== Municipalities ==
Since 2009 (Law No. 18567 of 13 September 2009), the Uruguayan departments have been subdivided into municipalities. This system has been widely criticized as a waste of resources, due to Uruguay's small population of 3.4 million. The inaugural municipal elections were held in 2010, with municipal officials assuming office later in the year. Currently there are 136 municipalities.

== See also ==
- List of postal codes in Uruguay
- ISO 3166-2:UY
