= Route 26 (Uruguay) =

Road in Uruguay

Route 26
- Ruta 26

Route information
- Maintained by Ministry of Transport & Public Works
- Length: 486 km (302 mi)

Major junctions
- West-southwest end: Route 3 near Paysandú
- Route 3 Route 4 Route 5 in Tacuarembó; Route 44 in Ansina; Route 6 Route 7 in Melo; Route 44 in Melo; Route 8 in Melo Route 18 in Río Branco
- East-southeast end: Río Branco at the border with Brazil

Location
- Country: Uruguay

Highway system
- National Routes of Uruguay
← Route 21	→ Route 27

Route 26 is a national route of Uruguay. It is one of the main Uruguayan routes covering the country from west to east, connecting Río Branco to other cities like Melo and Tacuarembó. Its "Kilometer Zero" (starting point), is at the route 3 junction.

This route covers a distance of 486 km (302 mi). It bears the name of the politician and civil war hero Leandro Gómez.

== Destinations ==
These are the populated places Route 26 passes through.

- Paysandú Department
  - km 0: Near Paysandú, on the Route 3 junction
- Tacuarembó Department
  - km 203: Tacuarembó city, the capital of the Tacuarembó Department, on the Route 5 junction
  - km 252: Ansina near the Route 44 junction
  - km 312: Las Toscas 7 km away from the Route 6 junction
- Cerro Largo Department
  - km 398: Melo
  - km 485: Río Branco. It later merges with José Hilario Uriarte road, then Avenida Centenario, and later the

Barão de Mauá International Bridge.
