= National Routes of Uruguay =

Highway system in Uruguay

The National Routes of Uruguay (officially in Spanish, Rutas nacionales de Uruguay) are the most important transport routes in the country, linking all locations. It has a network of 8,698 km of which 303 km are with concrete, asphalt 3,164 km, 4,220 km bituminous and 1,009 km rough.

== Route numbers ==
Signal	Itinerary
Gral. Líber Seregni	Montevideo-Punta del Este (90 km)
Brigadier Gral. Manuel Oribe	Montevideo-Colonia del Sacramento (177 km)
Grito de Asencio	Rosario-Fray Bentos (180 km)
Gral. José Artigas	Route1(km.67)-Bella Unión, Artigas Department (592 km)
Andrés Artigas	Artigas-Carlos Reyles (330 km)
Brigadier Gral. Fructuoso Rivera	Montevideo-Rivera (501 km)
Joaquín Suárez	Montevideo-Paso de Frontera (338 km)
Gral. Aparicio Saravia	Montevideo-Melo (387 km)
Brigadier Gral. Antonio Lavalleja	Montevideo-Aceguá (486 km)
Gral. Leonardo Olivera	Soca-Chuy (274 km)
Juan Díaz de Solís	Canelones-Aguas Dulces (162 km)
Ing. Eladio Dieste	Ecilda Paullier-Atlántida (160 km)
Luis Alberto de Herrera	Minas-Florida (96 km)
Bartolomé Hidalgo	Aiguá-Velazquez(48 km)
Brigadier Gral. Venancio Flores	Mercedes-La Coronilla (481 km)
Ricardo Ferrés	
Cnel. Lorenzo Latorre	
Treinta y Tres Orientales	
Brigadier Gral. Leandro Gómez	Paysandú-Río Branco (486 km)
Mario Heber	
Cnel. Andrés Latorre	
Brigadier Gral. Eugenio Garzón	
Cnel. Gorgonio Aguiar	
Domingo Burgueño Miguel	Aiguá-Punta del Este (89.5 km)
Cnel. Fernando Otorgués	
Cnel. Bernabé Rivera	
Cnel. Manuel Francisco Artigas	
Cap. Juan Antonio Artigas	
Wilson Ferreira Aldunate	

== Types of routes ==
The Ministry of Transport and Public Works classifies Uruguayan Routes as Corredor Internacional, Primary Network (Red Primaria), Secondary Network (Red Secundaria) and Tertiary Network (Red Terciaria).

=== Corredor Internacional ===
Pathways linking Montevideo with the main points of departure from Uruguay.

- Route 1, all the way.
- Route 2, all the way.
- Route 3, all the way.
- Route 5, all the way.
- Route 8, from the beginning of Montevideo to Treinta y Tres.
- Route 9, all the way.

=== Primary network ===
Pathways linking other department capitals.

- Route 6: the nearest stretch to Montevideo (80 km approximately).
- Route 7: the nearest stretch to Montevideo (100 km approximately).
- Route 8: from Treinta y Tres to Aceguá.
- Route 21: all the way.
- Route 24: all the way.
- Route 26: all the way.
- Route 30: from the junction with Route 5 to Artigas.
- Ruta Interbalnearia: all the way.

=== Secondary and tertiary networks ===
Minor roads linking towns, some resorts or important agribusiness areas.
