= Municipality of Guichón =

Municipality of Guichón Municipio de Guichón
- Municipality
- Municipality of Guichón
- Location of the municipality of Guichón within the department of Paysandú and Uruguay.
- Country: Uruguay
- Department: Paysandú
- Founded: 15 March 2010
- Seat: Guichón

Government
  - Mayor: María de Lourdes Suárez (PN)

Area
  - Total: 1,670.1 km^{2} (644.8 sq mi)

Population (2011)
  - Total: 6,860
  - Density: 4.11/km^{2} (10.6/sq mi)
- Time zone: UTC-3
- Constituencies: KEA, KEB, KEC and KED
- Website: www.municipiodeguichon.com

The municipality of Guichón is one of the municipalities of Paysandú Department, Uruguay. Its seat is the city of Guichón.

== Location ==
The municipality is located in the southeast corner of the Paysandú Department, bordering Rio Negro Department to the south, and Tacuarembó Department to the east.

== Features ==
The municipality of Guichón was created by Law N° 18.653 of 15 March 2010, and is part of the Paysandú Department. It comprises the KEA, KEB, KEC and KED constituencies of that department. Its limits were defined in Decree 6063/2010 of the Departmental Board of Paysandú.

The territory of this municipality covers a total area of 1670.1 km^{2}, and it has a population of 6860 inhabitants according to 2011 census data, which means it has a population density of 4.1 inhabitants per km^{2}.

== Settlements ==
The following populated places are part of this municipality:

- Guichón (seat)
- Morató
- Piñera
- Merinos
- Tres Árboles
- Beisso
- Tiatucurá (also known as Villa María)
- Cuchilla de Fuego
- Termas de Almirón resort

== Authorities ==
The authority of the municipality is the Municipal Council, integrated by the Mayor (who presides it) and four Councilors.

Mayors by period
N°	Mayor	Party	Start	End	Notes
1	María de Lourdes Suárez	National Party	9 July 2010	8 July 2015	Elected Mayor
2	María de Lourdes Suárez	National Party	9 July 2015	2020	Reelected Mayor
