= Route 1 (Uruguay) =

Road in Uruguay

Route 1
- Ruta 1
- Brigadier General Manuel Oribe
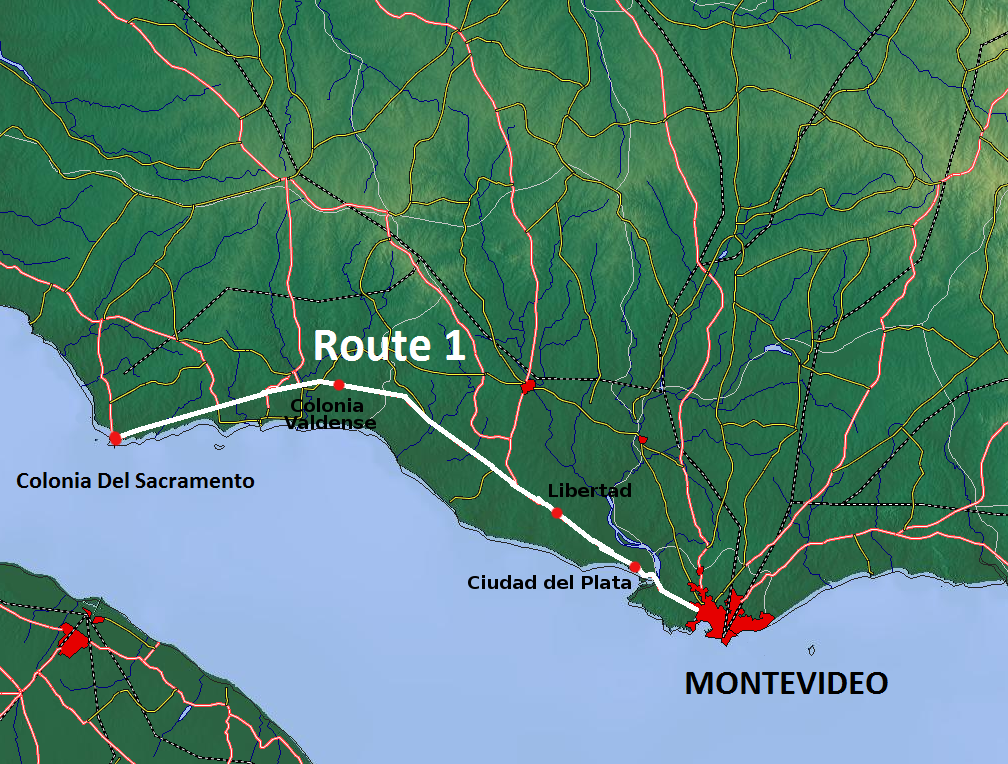

Route information
- Maintained by Ministry of Transport & Public Works
- Length: 174.29 km (108.30 mi)

Major junctions
- East end: Montevideo (Bella Vista)
- Montevideo Department: • Km.9 La Paloma - Tomkinson: Route 5 N > Canelones, Florida, Durazno, Tacuarembó, Rivera; San José Department: • Km.52 Libertad: Route 45 N > Rodríguez > ...; •Km.61 (6.5 km after Pitooooo Puntas de Valdez): Route 3 N San José, Trinidad, Young, Paysandú, Salto, Bella Unión • Km.101 Ecilda Paullier: Route 11 E > San José de Mayo, Canelones, Atlántida > Route IB; Colonia Department: • Km.127 (7 km after Colonia Valdense): Route 2 N > Rosario, Cardona, NW >; Mercedes, Fray Bentos, Argentina R.136 • Km.137 (17 km after Colonia Valdense): Route 54 S > Juan Lacaze; Route 54 N > Route 12; • Km.148 (28 km after Colonia Valdense): Route 22 N > Tarariras, NW > Route 21; • Km.163 (43 km after Colonia Valdense): Route 50 NE > Tarariras; > (Avenida Franklin D. Roosevelt)
- West end: Colonia del Sacramento

Location
- Country: Uruguay

Highway system
- National Routes of Uruguay
← Route 21	→ Route IB

Route 1 is a national route of Uruguay. In 1975, it was assigned the name Brigadier General Manuel Oribe, a national hero of Uruguay. It connects Montevideo with Colonia del Sacramento to the west along the coast. The road is approximately 177 kilometres (110 mi) in length.

The distance notation along Route 1 uses the same Kilometre Zero reference as Routes 3, 5, 6, 7, 8, 9 and IB, which is the Pillar of Peace of Plaza de Cagancha in Central Montevideo.

Route 1 crosses the Santa Lucia River on the border between the departments of Montevideo and San Jose along a modern 4-lane bridge with a length of 800 metres. It was crossed by the old 2-lane bridge opened in 1925 on the old Route 1, which still exists today and is used as a shortcut by the people of Santiago Vázquez.

== Destinations and junctions ==
These are the populated places Route 5 passes through, as well as its main junctions with other National Roads.

Montevideo Department

- Km. 9 La Paloma - Tomkinson, Route 5 North to Canelones, Florida, Durazno, Tacuarembó and Rivera.

San José Department

- Km. 52 Libertad, Route 45 North to Rodríguez
- Km. 61 (6.5 km after Puntas de Valdez), Route 3 North to San José, Trinidad, Young, Paysandú, Salto and Bella Unión.
- Km. 101 Ecilda Paullier, Route 11 East to San José de Mayo, Canelones, Atlántida and Route IB

Colonia Department

- Km. 127 (7 km after Colonia Valdense), Route 2 North to Rosario, Cardona, and the Northwest to Mercedes, Fray Bentos and Route 136 of Argentina.
- Km. 137 (17 km after Colonia Valdense), Route 54 South to Juan Lacaze, Route 54 North to Route 12.
- Km. 148 (28 km after Colonia Valdense), Route 22 North to Tarariras and then Northwest to Route 21.
- Km. 163 (43 km after Colonia Valdense), Route 50 Northeast to Tarariras
- Km. 177 Ends into Avenida Franklin D. Roosevelt of Colonia del Sacramento.
