= Route 13 (Uruguay) =

Road in Uruguay

Route 13
- Ruta 13
- Bartolomé Hidalgo

Route information
- Maintained by Ministry of Transport & Public Works

Location
- Country: Uruguay

Highway system
- National Routes of Uruguay

Route 13 is a national route of Uruguay. In 1983, it was assigned the name Bartolomé Hidalgo. It begins near Aiguá and joins Route 15 near Velazquez.

Route 13 has a total length of 110 kilometers, or approximately 68.3 miles. The route is separated into two sections, the first of which runs from Kilometer 150 to Kilometer 218, and the second section runs from Kilometer 227 to Kilometer 269. During this second stretch of road, it crosses in junction with Route 15 going east, until it ends at Route 16. Route 13 passes through the departments of Lavalleja Department, Maldonado Department, and Rocha Department.
