= Paysandú (disambiguation) =

Paysandú is a city in western Uruguay.

Paysandu may also refer to:

== Places ==
- Paysandú, a Uruguayan city on the River Uruguay
  - Paysandú Airport, the airport serving Paysandú, Uruguay
- Paysandú Department, a political division of Uruguay
- Chacras de Paysandú, a densely populated rural area of Paysandú Department, Uruguay
- Nuevo Paysandú, a suburb of Paysandú, Uruguay
- Paysandú-Colón Bridge, a former denomination of the General Artigas Bridge

== History ==
- Siege of Paysandú (1864–1865), an episode of the Uruguayan War

== Sports ==
- Clube Esportivo Paysandu, a former Brazilian football club based in Brusque, Santa Catarina state
- Club Paysandú Bella Vista, a Uruguayan football club from Paysandú
- Paysandú Fútbol Club, a football club from Paysandú
- Paysandu Sport Club, a Brazilian football club located in Belém, Pará

== Food ==
- A type of ham or tongue (cooked meat) popular in Victorian times featured in The Diary of a Nobody by George and Weedon Grossmith
