= Route 5 (Uruguay) =

Road in Uruguay

Coordinates: 34°48′21″S 56°30′34.3″W

Route 5
- Ruta 5
- Brigadier General Fructuoso Rivera
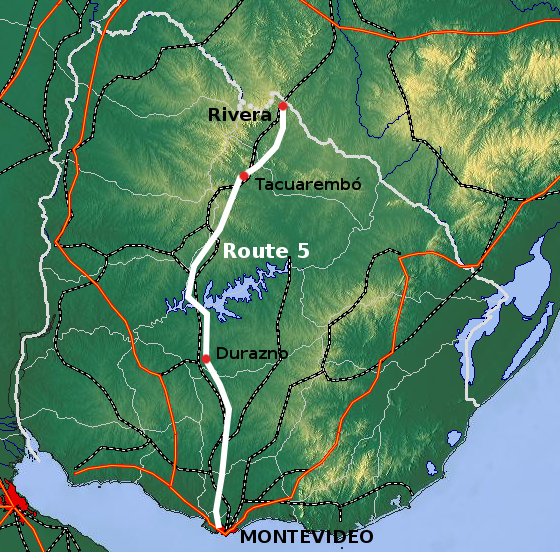

Route information
- Maintained by Ministry of Transport & Public Works
- Length: 501 km (311 mi)

Major junctions
- South end: Montevideo (La Paloma - Tomkinson)
- Montevideo Department: • Lezica - Melilla: Route 102 E > Carrasco Int. Airport; Canelones Department: • Canelones: Route 11 NW > San José de Mayo; Route 11 SE > Atlántida; Florida Department: • Florida (5 km before): Route 12 SE > Minas, Punta Ballena; Durazno Department: • Durazno: Route 14 W > Trinidad, Mercedes; Route 14 E > La Coronilla (Rocha) Tacuarembó Department: • Tacuarembó: Route 26 W-SW > Paysandú; Route 26 E-SE > Melo; Rivera Department: Route 30 NW > Artigas; > (Guido Machado Brun)
- North end: Rivera

Location
- Country: Uruguay

Highway system
- National Routes of Uruguay
| ← Route 1 | → Route 27 |

Route 5 is a national route of Uruguay. In 1975, it was assigned the name Brigadier General Fructuoso Rivera, a national hero of Uruguay. It is one of the most important highways in country, along with Route 3, connecting Montevideo in the south with Rivera in the north and passing through the centre of the country. The road is approximately 501 kilometres (311 mi) in length. Upon reaching Santana do Livramento (the Brazilian extension of Rivera), the road joins federal highway BR-158.

The distance notation along Route 5 uses the same Kilometre Zero reference as Routes 1, 3, 6, 7, 8, 9 and IB, which is the Pillar of Peace of Plaza de Cagancha in Central Montevideo.

== Destinations and junctions ==
These are the populated places Route 5 passes through, as well as its main junctions with other National Roads.

Montevideo Department

- 10 kilometres (6.2 mi) after its junction with Route 1, near the Ángel S. Adami Airport, Route 102 connects with Carrasco International Airport.

Canelones Department

- Km. 33 Villa Felicidad
- Km. 47 Canelones, Route 11 Southeast to Atlántida & Northwest to San José de Mayo

Florida Department

- Km. 75 Mendoza
- Km. 94 Route 12 Southeast to Minas & Punta Ballena
- Km. 98 Florida
- Km. 143 Sarandí Grande

Durazno Department

- Km. 183 Durazno, Route 14 East to Sarandí del Yí & La Coronilla (Coast of Rocha), West to Trinidad & Mercedes

Tacuarembó Department

- Km. 249 Paso de los Toros
- Km. 265 Route 20 to Fray Bentos
- Km. 390 Tacuarembó, Route 26 West & Southwest to Paysandú, East & Southeast to Melo

Rivera Department

- Km. 458 Route 30 Northwest to Artigas
- Km. 496 Route 27 Southeast to Vichadero and Route 6
- Km. 501 Rivera - connects to Brazilian Federal Roads BR-158 and BR-293.
