= Route 14 (Uruguay) =

Road in Uruguay

Route 14
- Ruta 14
- Brigadier General Venancio Flores

Route information
- Maintained by Ministry of Transport & Public Works

Location
- Country: Uruguay

Highway system
- National Routes of Uruguay

Route 14 is a national route of Uruguay. In 1983, it was assigned the name Brigadier General Venancio Flores. It connects Mercedes, Uruguay and joins Route 9 on the east coast near La Coronila.
