= Arroyo Carpinchurí =

River in Paysandú Department, Uruguay

Coordinates: 31°40′38″S 57°54′28″W

Arroyo Carpinchurí, also called Arroyo Carpinchury, is a river located in western Uruguay.

The river, which is part of the catchment area of the Uruguay River, rises northeast of Cerro Santa Blanca or southeast of Cerro del Escondite in the area of the Paysandú Department. From there it runs west to its mouth in the Arroyo Chapicuy Grande southwest of Chapicuy. The name Carpinchury has its origin in Guaraní, where it is a combination of Castilian and Guaraní languages.
