= Carlos Reyles, Uruguay =

Carlos Reyles
- Village
- Location in Uruguay
- Coordinates: 33°3′27″S 56°28′35″W
- Country: Uruguay
- Department: Durazno Department

Population (2011)
  - Total: 976
- Time zone: UTC -3
- Postal code: 97003
- Dial plan: +598 4368 (+4 digits)

Carlos Reyles is a village in the Durazno Department of central Uruguay.

== Geography ==
It is located on the Route 5 on the spot where Route 4 splits off in a northwestern direction to Río Negro Department. It is about 37 kilometres (23 mi) north of the city of Durazno.

== History ==
On 16 August 1939 the "nucleus of houses" that were in the area of "Estación Molles" were given the name "Carlos Reyles" by the Act of Ley Nº 9.860, and on 12 August 1988 its status was elevated to "Pueblo" (village) by the Act of Ley Nº 15.972.

== Population ==
In 2011 Carlos Reyles had a population of 976.

Year	Population
1908	1,965
1963	921
1975	938
1985	976
1996	1,089
2004	1,039
2011	976

Source: Instituto Nacional de Estadística de Uruguay

== Places of worship ==
- Parish Church of the Sacred Heart (Roman Catholic, Franciscan Sisters of the Incarnate Word)
