= Route 9 (Uruguay) =

Road in Uruguay

Route 9
- Ruta 9
- Coronel Leonardo Olivera
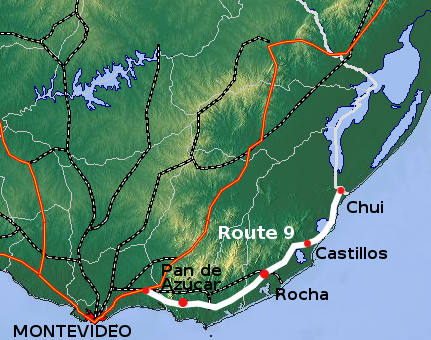

Route information
- Maintained by Ministry of Transport & Public Works
- Length: 274 km (170 mi)

Major junctions
- West end: near Dr. Francisco Soca
- East end: Chuy

Location
- Country: Uruguay

Highway system
- National Routes of Uruguay
← Route 8	→ Route 19

Route 9 is a national route of Uruguay. In 1975, it was assigned the name Coronel Leonardo Olivera, a national hero of Uruguay. It connects Dr. Francisco Soca with Chuy in the northeast.

The distance notation along Route 9 uses the same Kilometre Zero reference as Routes 1, 3, 5, 6, 7, 8, 10 and IB, which is the Pillar of Peace of Plaza de Cagancha in Central Montevideo. The length of the road, from its beginning at Km. 66 to its end at Km. 340 is 274 kilometres (170 mi) in length.

== Destinations and junctions ==
These are the populated places Route 9 passes through, as well as its main junctions with other National Roads.

Canelones Department

- Km. 66 of Route 8 near Dr. Francisco Soca.
- Km. 78 Route 70 South to Cuchilla Alta.

Maldonado Department

- Km. 89 Gregorio Aznárez
- Km. 94 Merges Ruta Interbalnearia near Solís.
- Km. 104/105 Splits from Ruta Interbalnearia, Route 37 South to Piriápolis.
- Km. 106 Pan De Azúcar, Route 60 North to Minas.
- Km. 126 Route 12 Northwest to Minas, South to Punta Ballena.
- Km. 137 Route 39 North to Aiguá, South to San Carlos, Maldonado & Punta del Este.
- Km. 144 Route 104 Southeast to Manantiales.
- Km. 161 Camino Sainz Martinez South to Faro José Ignacio.

Rocha Department

- Km. 208/210 Rocha, Route 109 Northwest to Aiguá & Route 15 Southeast to La Paloma.
- Km. 236 19 de Abril
- Km. 265 Castillos, Route 16 North to Route 14, Southeast to Aguas Dulces.
- Km. 281 La Esmeralda
- Km. 299 Road Southeast to Punta del Diablo.
- Km. 302/304 Santa Teresa (Parque Nacional & Fortaleza)
- Km. 312 Route 14 West & Northwest to Lascano and José Pedro Varela.
- Km. 315 La Coronilla
- Km. 340 Chuy, Route 19 East to Fuerte San Miguel, 18 de Julio and to Route 15. Also connects with Federal Route BR-471 of Brazil.
