= Andresito, Uruguay =

Andresito
- Village
- Location in Uruguay
- Coordinates: 33°8′0″S 57°9′55″W
- Country: Uruguay
- Department: Flores Department

Population (2011)
  - Total: 261
- Time zone: UTC -3
- Postal code: 85002
- Dial plan: +598 436 (+5 digits)

Andresito is a village in the north of Flores Department of Uruguay.

== Geography ==
It is located on Km. 238 of Route 3 and close to its junctions with Route 14.

A bridge passes Route 3 over Arroyo Grande to national park Parque Bartolomé Hidalgo 5 kilometres (3.1 mi) northwest from the village and then, after another 2 kilometres (1.2 mi), another bridge passes it over Río Negro into Río Negro Department. Both rivers discharge into Lake Paso del Palmar at this point.

== Population ==
In 2011 Andresito had a population of 261.

Year	Population
1963	135
1975	125
1985	176
1996	140
2004	271
2011	261

Source: Instituto Nacional de Estadística de Uruguay

== See also ==
- Geography of Uruguay
