= Route 39 (Uruguay) =

Road in Uruguay

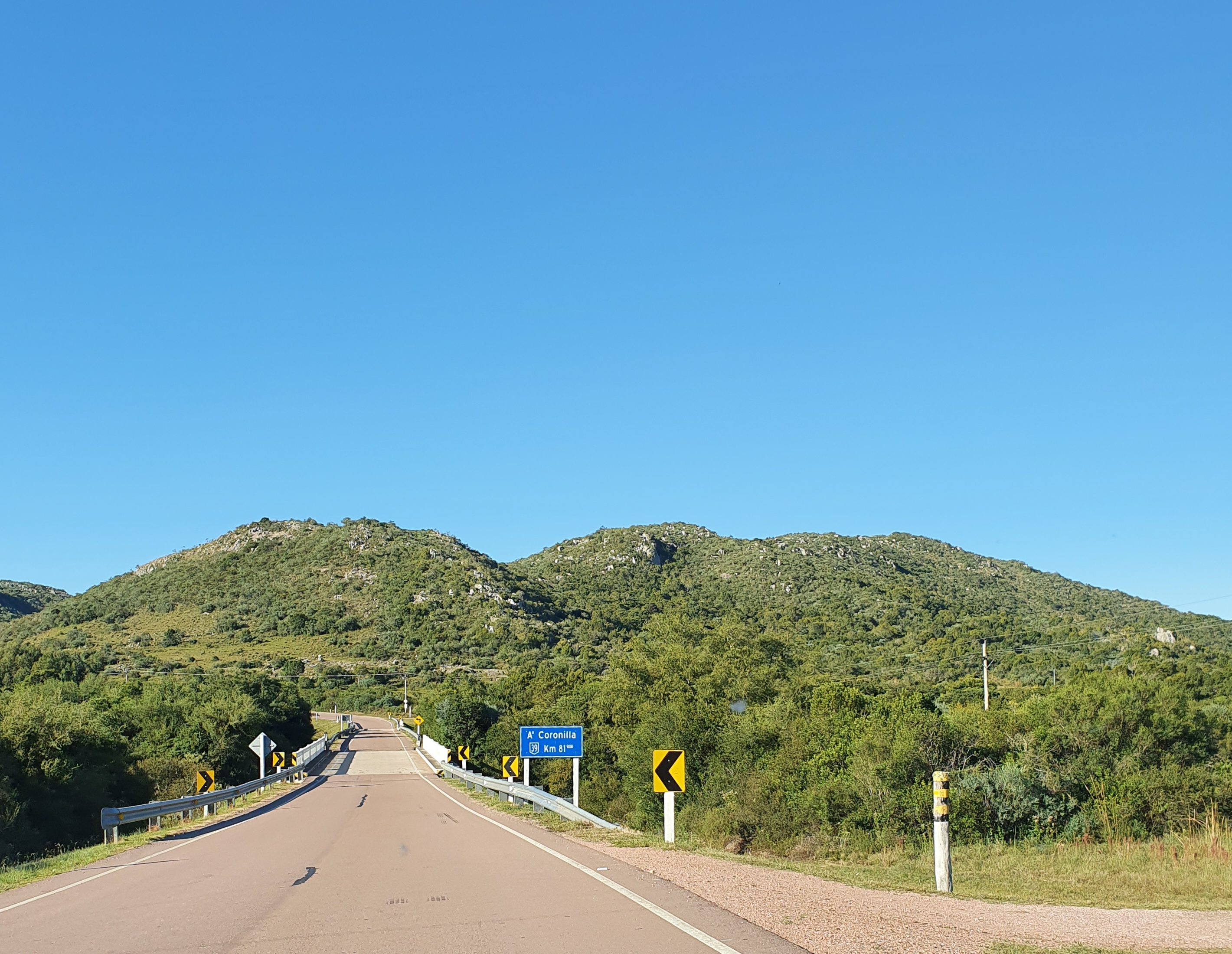

Location
- Country: Uruguay

Highway system
- National Routes of Uruguay

Route 39 is a national route of Uruguay. It connects Aiguá to Punta del Este on the coast. This road passes through the Maldonado Department and the city of Maldonado.

It was named after the local politician Domingo Burgueño.
