= Rocha, Uruguay =

Capital city of Rocha Department, Uruguay

Rocha
- Capital city
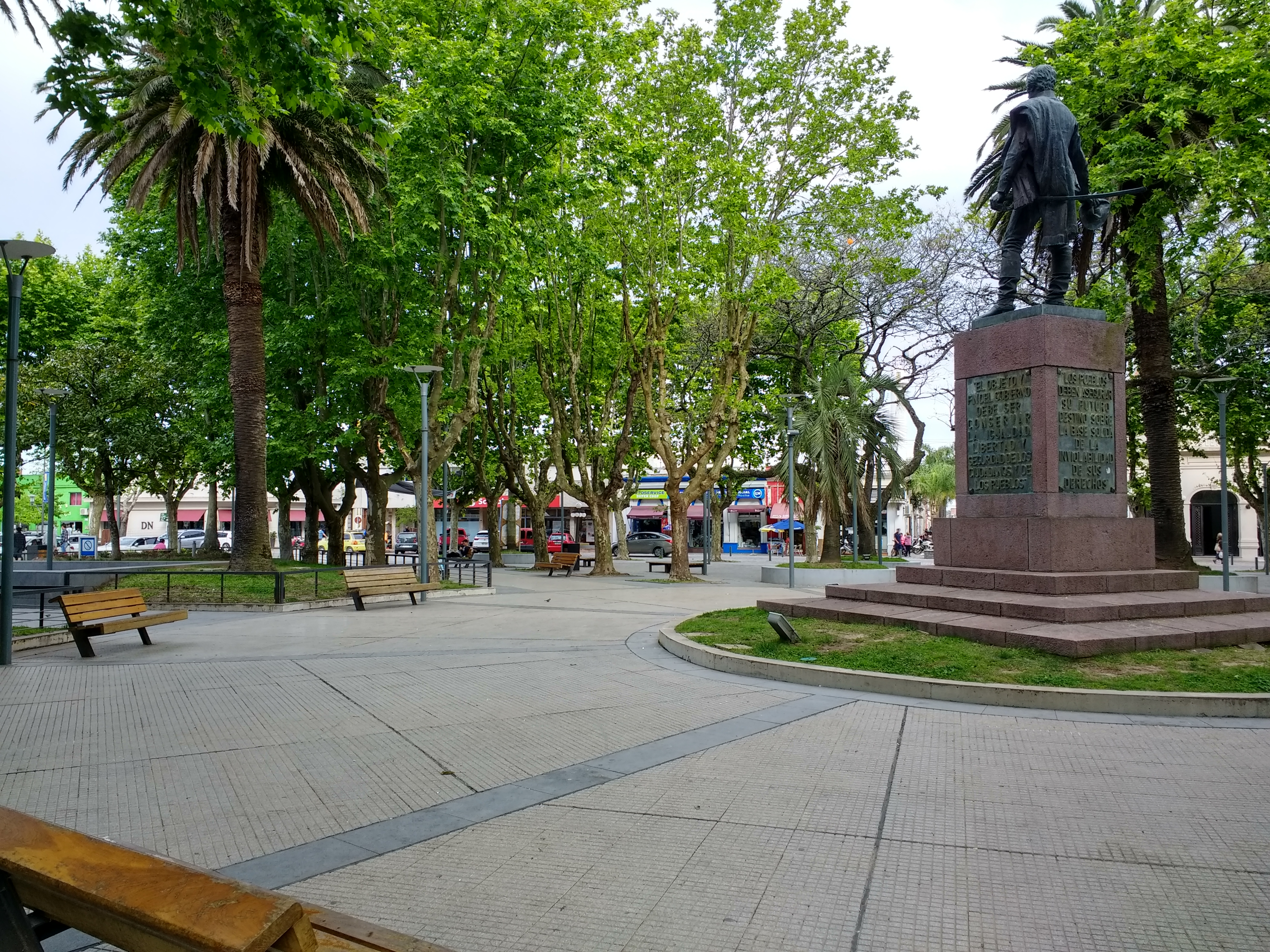
- Plaza Independencia

- Location in Uruguay
- Coordinates: 34°29′0″S 54°21′0″W
- Country: Uruguay
- Department: Rocha
- Founded: 1793

Area
  - Total: 19.1 km^{2} (7.4 sq mi)
- Elevation: 27 m (89 ft)

Population (2023)
  - Total: 26,784
  - Density: 1,400/km^{2} (3,630/sq mi)
  - Demonym: Rochense
- Time zone: UTC -3
- Postal code: 27000
- Dial plan: +598 447 (+5 digits)
- Climate: Cfa

Rocha (Spanish pronunciation: [ˈrotʃa]) is the capital city of the Rocha Department in Uruguay. With a population of 26,784, it is the 22nd-largest city in Uruguay.

== History ==
It was founded in 1793 and had acquired the status of "Villa" (town) before the independence of Uruguay. On 7 July 1880 it was made capital of the Department of Rocha by the Act of Ley Nº 1.474, while its status was elevated to "Ciudad" (city) on 10 January 1894 by the Act of Ley Nº 2.252.

== Demographics ==
As of the 2023 census, Rocha had a population of 26,784.

Historical population
Year	Pop.	±% p.a.
1908	12,200	—
1963	19,484	+0.85%
1975	21,502	+0.82%
1985	24,013	+1.11%
1996	26,017	+0.73%
2004	25,538	−0.23%
2011	25,422	−0.07%
2023	26,784	+0.44%
Source: INE

== Geography ==
The city is located on the intersection of Route 9 with Route 15, about 70 kilometres (43 mi) northeast of San Carlos of Maldonado Department. The stream Arroyo Rocha flows along the west limits of the city.

=== Climate ===
Rocha has a mild humid subtropical climate (Cfa, according to the Köppen climate classification), with pleasant summers and cool winters. It was oceanic (Cfb) before the current climatic table (1961-1990 period). The precipitation is evenly distributed throughout the year, with an average of 1,123 mm (44.2 in). The hottest month, January, has an average temperature of 22.5 °C (72.5 °F), and the coldest month, July, has an average of 11.2 °C (52.2 °F). The average yearly temperature is 16.8 °C (62.2 °F).

Climate data for Rocha (1991–2020, extremes 1944–2020)
Month	Jan	Feb	Mar	Apr	May	Jun	Jul	Aug	Sep	Oct	Nov	Dec	Year
Record high °C (°F)	41.5 (106.7)	39.0 (102.2)	39.0 (102.2)	35.2 (95.4)	31.8 (89.2)	28.8 (83.8)	30.6 (87.1)	32.0 (89.6)	33.6 (92.5)	33.0 (91.4)	38.6 (101.5)	40.0 (104.0)	41.5 (106.7)
Mean daily maximum °C (°F)	28.1 (82.6)	27.4 (81.3)	25.8 (78.4)	22.6 (72.7)	19.3 (66.7)	16.4 (61.5)	15.5 (59.9)	17.2 (63.0)	18.2 (64.8)	20.8 (69.4)	23.7 (74.7)	26.7 (80.1)	21.8 (71.2)
Daily mean °C (°F)	22.4 (72.3)	22.0 (71.6)	20.5 (68.9)	17.6 (63.7)	14.4 (57.9)	11.8 (53.2)	10.9 (51.6)	12.3 (54.1)	13.3 (55.9)	15.8 (60.4)	18.2 (64.8)	20.9 (69.6)	16.7 (62.1)
Mean daily minimum °C (°F)	16.7 (62.1)	16.6 (61.9)	15.2 (59.4)	12.6 (54.7)	9.6 (49.3)	7.2 (45.0)	6.3 (43.3)	7.3 (45.1)	8.4 (47.1)	10.8 (51.4)	12.7 (54.9)	15.0 (59.0)	11.5 (52.7)
Record low °C (°F)	5.2 (41.4)	5.0 (41.0)	4.6 (40.3)	−1.6 (29.1)	−1.2 (29.8)	−5.8 (21.6)	−5.6 (21.9)	−4.2 (24.4)	−3.4 (25.9)	−0.2 (31.6)	1.0 (33.8)	3.5 (38.3)	−5.8 (21.6)
Average precipitation mm (inches)	110.5 (4.35)	109.2 (4.30)	134.8 (5.31)	118.6 (4.67)	107.9 (4.25)	113.9 (4.48)	108.2 (4.26)	105.8 (4.17)	95.5 (3.76)	102.7 (4.04)	90.7 (3.57)	87.0 (3.43)	1,284.8 (50.58)
Average precipitation days (≥ 1.0 mm)	7	8	8	8	8	8	8	8	7	8	7	6	91
Average relative humidity (%)	73	75	78	80	82	82	81	79	79	78	75	72	78
Mean monthly sunshine hours	268.3	222.1	220.0	179.4	152.0	128.9	138.3	165.3	177.1	192.1	239.3	261.6	2,344.4
Source 1: Instituto Uruguayo de Metereología
Source 2: NOAA (precipitation and sun 1991–2020), Instituto Nacional de Investigación Agropecuaria (humidity 1980–2009)

== Transport ==
Rocha is on the main road from Montevideo to the border with Brazil. Buses connect it to Montevideo. The rail station was closed in the 1980s. There is a small local airfield. There are plans to improve the local infrastructure substantially. The major project planned is to build a deep water port in or near La Paloma. There are also plans to build an airport to bring in tourism, for example, Rocha's lagoon has a circular bridge especially for it.

== Places of worship ==
- Parish Church of Our Lady of Remedies (Roman Catholic)
- Parish Church of Our Lady of Fatima (Roman Catholic)

== In literature ==
Rocha department features in Carlos María Domínguez's 2004 novel Casa de Papel (The house of paper). The narrator visits the ruins of a house of books, which had been built and then destroyed by an obsessive book collector on the sand spit separating Rocha lagoon from the ocean.

== Notable people ==
- Javier Barrios Amorín, politician
- Alberto Demicheli (1896–1980), Uruguayan political figure
- Gonzalo González (born 1993), Uruguayan footballer
- Gladys Castelvecchi, poet
- Carlos Malo, singer
- Carlos Julio Pereyra, politician
- Elio Rodríguez (born 1962), former Uruguayan footballer
- Renzo Sánchez (born 2004), Uruguayan footballer
- Jesús Toscanini, footballer
- Pedro Vaz, diplomat
- Constancio C. Vigil, author
