= Saca Chispas =

Populated place in Paysandú Department, Uruguay

Saca Chispas is a populated place in Paysandú Department, Uruguay.
