= Orgoroso =

- Village
- Location in Uruguay
- Coordinates: 32°23′0″S 57°31′0″W
- Country: Uruguay
- Department: Paysandú Department

Population (2011)
  - Total: 583
- Time zone: UTC -3
- Postal code: 60003
- Dial plan: +598 4747 (+4 digits)

Orgoroso is a village in the Paysandú Department of western Uruguay.

== Geography ==
It is located on Ruta 90 about 53 kilometres (33 mi) east of the department capital Paysandú and 32 kilometres (20 mi) west of Guichón. The railroad track that joins the city of Paysandú with Paso de los Toros passes through the south limits of the village.

== Population ==
In 2011 Orgoroso had a population of 583.

Year	Population
1996	441
2004	516
2011	583

Source: Instituto Nacional de Estadística de Uruguay
