= Route 15 (Uruguay) =

Road in Uruguay

Route 15
- Ruta 15
- Javier Barrios Amorín

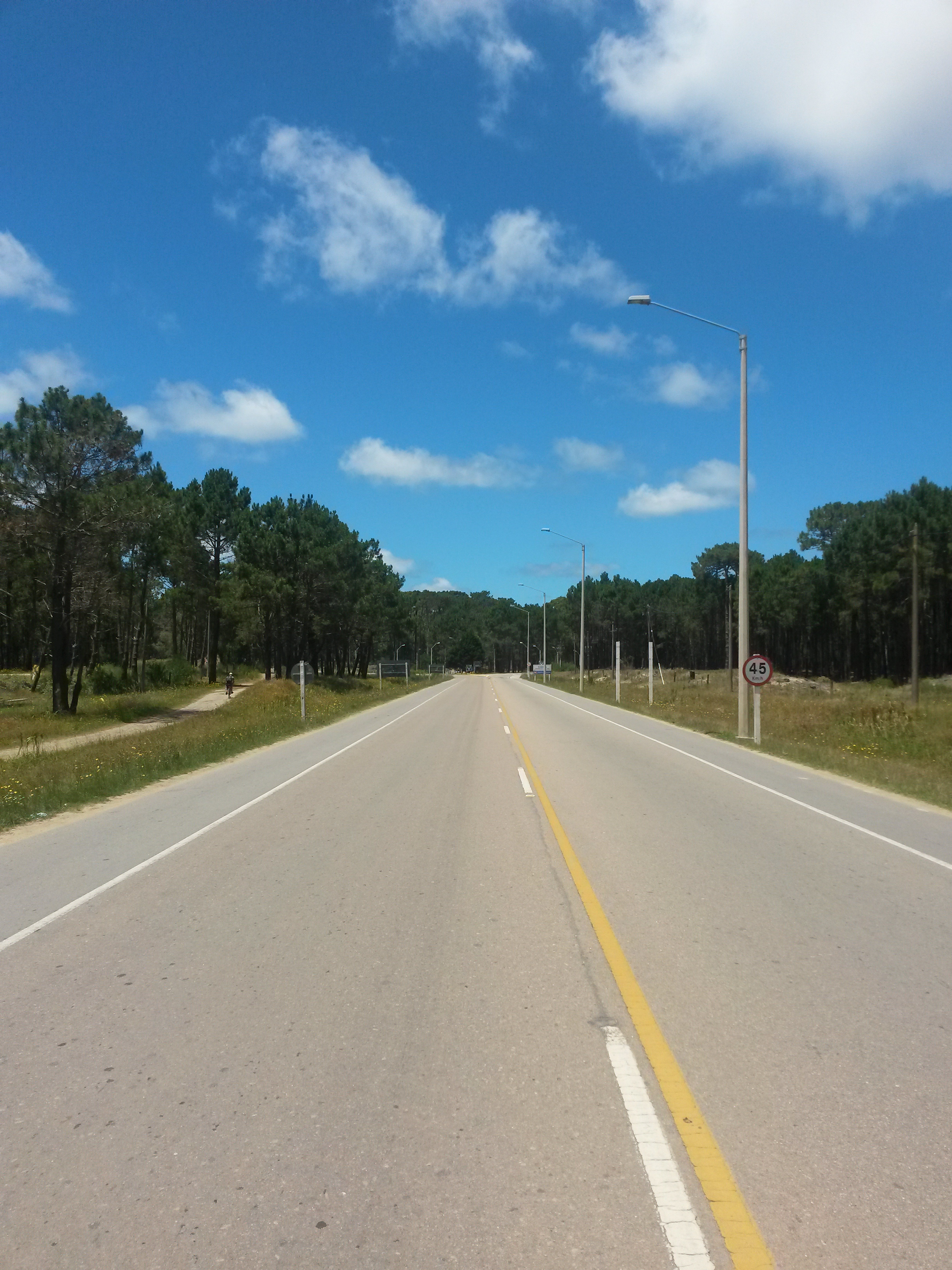
- Route 15, near the city of La Paloma.

Route information
- Maintained by Ministry of Transport & Public Works
- Length: 190 km (120 mi)

Major junctions
- South end: La Paloma
- North end: Cebollatí

Location
- Country: Uruguay

Highway system
- National Routes of Uruguay

Route 15 is a national route of Uruguay. It crosses the Rocha Department from the city of La Paloma in the south, to the town of Cebollatí in the north.

By law 13505 of 4 October 1966, this route was designated by the name of Javier Barrios Amorín, in the section between the city of La Paloma and Route 9.
