= Arroyo Chapicuy Grande =

River in Uruguay

Coordinates: 31°41′0″S 58°0′0″W

Arroyo Chapicuy Grande is a river located in western Uruguay.

The river that belongs to the catchment area of the Uruguay River rises near the Cuchilla de Haedo. From there, it runs westward in the Paysandú Department until it flows into the Uruguay River south of the city of Salto. Its main tributary is the Arroyo Carpinchurí.
