= Lorenzo Geyres =

- Village
- Location in Uruguay
- Coordinates: 32°5′0″S 57°55′0″W
- Country: Uruguay
- Department: Paysandú Department

Population (2011)
  - Total: 774
- Time zone: UTC -3
- Postal code: 60004
- Dial plan: +598 4754 (+4 digits)

Lorenzo Geyres is a village in Paysandú Department of western Uruguay.

== Geography ==
It is located about 3 kilometres (1.9 mi) northwest of Route 3 and about 30 kilometres (19 mi) north-northeast of the department capital Paysandú.

== History ==
A nucleus of houses near the railroad station Queguay became recognized as a village named "Queguay" by the Act of Ley Nº 333 on 6 July 1853. It was renamed to "Lorenzo Geyres" and its status was elevated to "Pueblo" (village) by the Act of Ley Nº 8.226 on 29 May 1928.

== Population ==
In 2011 Lorenzo Geyres had a population of 774.

Year	Population
1963	517
1975	474
1985	428
1996	573
2004	674
2011	774

Source: Instituto Nacional de Estadística de Uruguay
