= Las Toscas, Tacuarembó =

Las Toscas
- Village
- Location in Uruguay
- Coordinates: 32°9′0″S 55°0′30″W
- Country: Uruguay
- Department: Tacuarembó Department

Population (2011)
  - Total: 1,142
- Time zone: UTC -3
- Postal code: 45019
- Dial plan: +598 463 (+5 digits)

Las Toscas is a village or populated centre in the Tacuarembó Department of northern-central Uruguay.

== Geography ==
The village is located on Route 26, about 6.5 kilometres (4.0 mi) northwest of its intersection with Route 6 and about 60 kilometres (37 mi) southeast of Ansina. The stream Arroyo Caraguatá flows by the west limits of the village.

== Population ==
In 2011 Las Toscas had a population of 1,142.

Year	Population
1975	175
1985	461
1996	651
2004	781
2011	1,142

Source: Instituto Nacional de Estadística de Uruguay

== Places of worship ==
- Parish Church of the Holy Sacrament and St. Thérèse of Lisieux (Roman Catholic)
