= Cerro Chato, Paysandú =

Town in Paysandú, Uruguay

Coordinates: 31°52′18″S 57°32′19″W

Cerro Chato is a town in Paysandú Department, Uruguay, near the hamlets of Gallinal and Soto.

This area mainly produces peanuts, sweet potatoes, pumpkins, and citrus. Forestry has grown in recent years, an activity that generates seasonal work.

== Notable people ==
- Luis Almagro (born 1963), diplomat, Minister of Foreign Affairs 2010-2015, Secretary General of OAS 2015-2025
