= Porvenir, Uruguay =

Porvenir Pueblo Porvenir
- Village
- Location in Uruguay
- Coordinates: 32°23′38″S 57°58′4″W
- Country: Uruguay
- Department: Paysandú Department

Population (2011)
  - Total: 1,159
- Time zone: UTC -3
- Postal code: 60012
- Dial plan: +598 472 (+5 digits)

Porvenir or Pueblo Porvenir is a village in the Paysandú Department of western Uruguay.

== Geography ==
It is located south of Route 90 and northeast of Route 3, about 14 kilometres (8.7 mi) from the department capital city of Paysandú. It is an enclave within the populated rural area known as Chacras de Paysandú (Ranches of Paysandú), which is peripheral to the city.

== History ==
On 17 July 1903, it was declared a "Pueblo" (village) named "Colonia Porvenir" by the Act of Ley Nº 2.855.

== Population ==
In 2011 Porvenir had a population of 1,159.

Year	Population
1908	2,211
1963	558
1975	710
1985	734
1996	862
2004	1,035
2011	1,159

Source: Instituto Nacional de Estadística de Uruguay
