= Morato (disambiguation) =

Morato or Morató is a surname of various origins.

Morato may also refer to:

- Francisco Morato, city in São Paulo State, Brazil
- Tomas Morato Avenue, Quezon City, Philippines
- Uru-Murato, Bolivian indigenous
- Morató, Uruguay, town in Paysandú Department
