= Route 12 (Uruguay) =

Road in Uruguay

Route 12
- Ruta 12
- Doctor Luis Alberto de Herrera

Route information
- Maintained by Ministry of Transport & Public Works

Location
- Country: Uruguay

Highway system
- National Routes of Uruguay

Route 12 is a national route of Uruguay. In 1983, it was assigned the name Doctor Luis Alberto de Herrera. It connects Florida to Minas.
