= Villa Felicidad =

- Hamlet
- Location in Uruguay
- Coordinates: 34°39′0″S 56°14′0″W
- Country: Uruguay
- Department: Canelones Department

Population (2011)
  - Total: 1,344
- Time zone: UTC -3
- Postal code: 90300
- Dial plan: +598 2 (+7 digits)

Villa Felicidad is a hamlet (caserío) in the Canelones Department of southern Uruguay.

== Location ==
It is located on Km. 32 of Route 5, about 3 kilometres (1.9 mi) northwest of Progreso.

== Population ==
In 2011 Villa Felicidad had a population of 1,344.

Year	Population
1963	376
1975	567
1985	649
1996	791
2004	1,238
2011	1,344

Source: Instituto Nacional de Estadística de Uruguay
