= Sarandí Grande =

- City
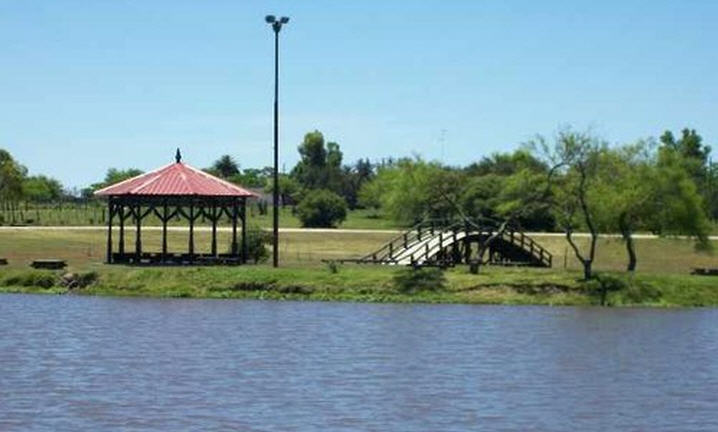
- Sarandí Grande, Uruguay

- Location in Uruguay
- Coordinates: 33°34′0″S 56°20′0″W
- Country: Uruguay
- Department: (Florida Department) Florida
- Founded: 1874

Population (2023 Census)
  - Total: 6,827
- Time zone: UTC -3
- Postal code: 94001
- Dial plan: +598 4354 (+4 digits)

Sarandí Grande is a city in the north of the Florida Department of central Uruguay.

== Geography ==
It is located on the intersection of Route 5 with Route 42, about 140 kilometres (87 mi) from Montevideo, 43 kilometres (27 mi) north-northwest of Florida, the capital city of the department, and 43 kilometres (27 mi) south-southeast of Durazno, the capital city of the Durazno Department.

== History ==
First on 6 July 1853, and then on 22 July 1861 the creation of a city in the modern location of Sarandí Grande was approved by the Acts of Ley N° 331 and Ley N° 695 respectively. The village was founded in October 1874 in the area of the railway station. On 13 June 1906, its status was established as "Pueblo" (village) by the Act of Ley N° 3.042, at the time serving as head of the judicial section of "Estación Sarandí". It was renamed "Sarandí" and its status was elevated to "Villa" (town) on 15 October 1923 by the Act of Ley N° 7.638. Finally, on 1 July 1956 it was renamed "Sarandí Grande" and its status was elevated to "Ciudad" (city) by the Act of Ley N° 11.960.

== Population ==
In 2023, Sarandi Grande had a population of 6,827. It is the second largest city of the department.

| Year | Population |
|---|---|
| 1908 | 3,579 |
| 1963 | 5,295 |
| 1975 | 5,545 |
| 1985 | 5,379 |
| 1996 | 5,635 |
| 2004 | 6,362 |
| 2011 | 6,130 |
| 2023 | 6,827 |

Source: Instituto Nacional de Estadística de Uruguay

== Places of worship ==
- Our Lady of the Pillar Parish Church (Roman Catholic)

== Economy ==
The economy relies on dairy farming and agriculture.

== See also ==
- Guarani language
