= Route 3 (Uruguay) =

Road in Uruguay

Coordinates: 32°41′30″S 57°38′34.4″W

Route 3
- Ruta 3
- General José Artigas
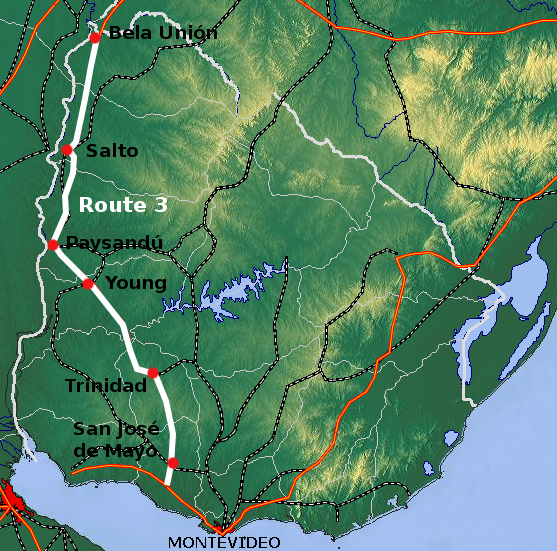

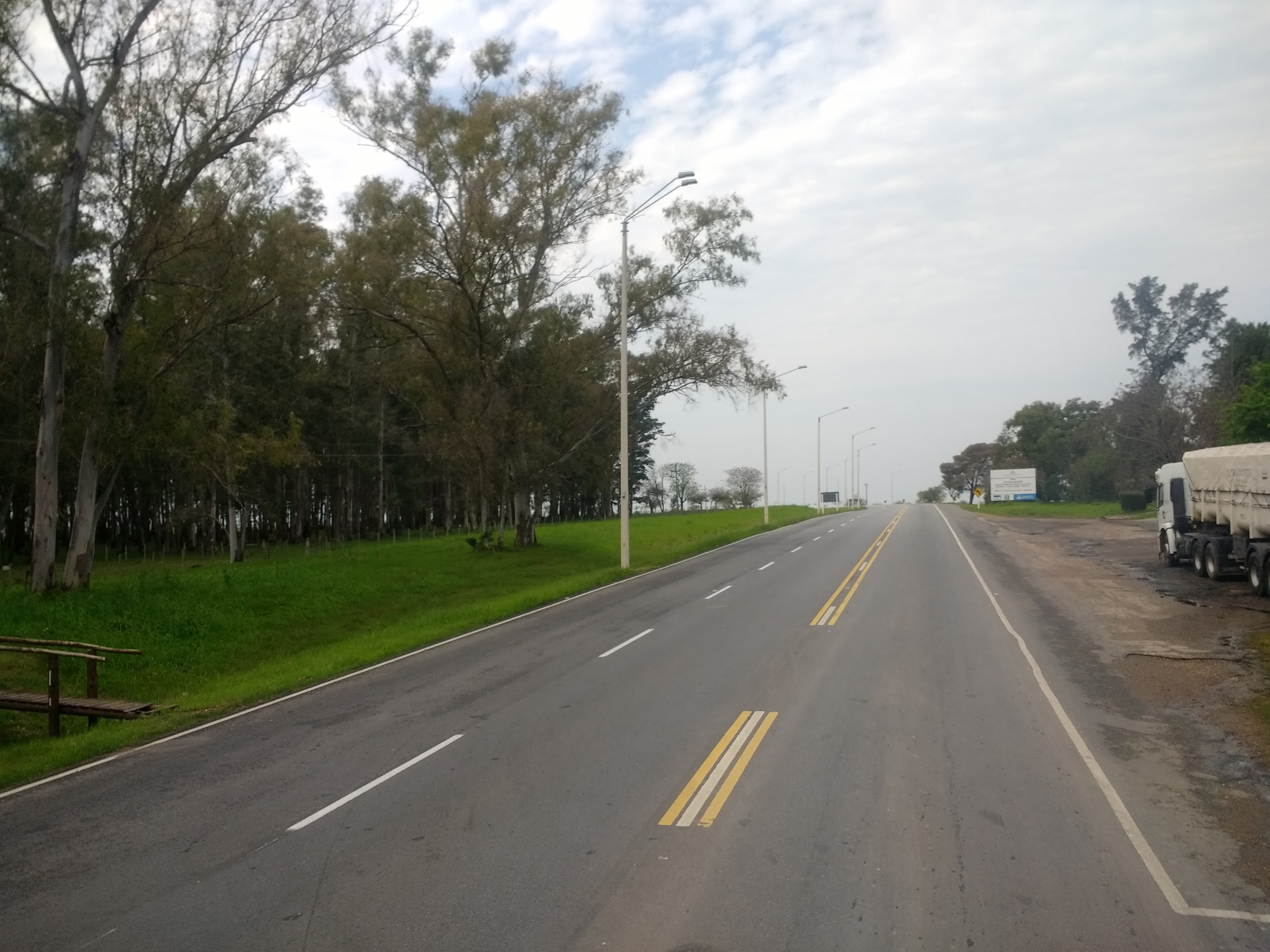

Route information
- Maintained by Ministry of Transport & Public Works
- Length: 564.6 km (350.8 mi)

Major junctions
- South end: Km.67 of Route 1 (near Puntas de Valdez & Rafael Perazza); Kilometre Zero is in Centro, Montevideo
- San José Department: • San José de Mayo: Route 11 W > Ecilda Paullier, Route 1; Route 11 E > Atlántida; Flores Department: • Trinidad: Route 14 W > Mercedes; Route 14 E > Durazno, La Coronilla; Río Negro Department: • Young: Route 25: S > Route 24, N > Route 90; Paysandú Department: • Paysandú: Route 90 E; Route 135 of Argentina; • 34.5 Km after Paysandú: Route 26: E-SE > Tacuarembó, Melo; Salto Department: • Salto: Route 31 SE > Tacuarembó; Artigas Department: • 23 Km before Bella Unión: Route 30 NE > Artigas; > BR-472 of Brazil
- North end: Bella Unión

Location
- Country: Uruguay

Highway system
- National Routes of Uruguay
← Route 1	→ Route 30

Route 3 is a national route of Uruguay. In 1975, it was assigned the name General José Artigas, the foremost national hero of Uruguay. It is one of the most important highways in the country along with Route 5, connecting the south coast near Rafael Perazza with Bella Unión in the extreme northwest. The road is approximately 592 kilometres (368 mi) in length.

Although Route 3 starts at Km. 67 of Route 1, its distance notation uses the same Kilometre Zero reference as Routes 1, 5, 6, 7, 8, 9 and IB, which is the Pillar of Peace of Plaza de Cagancha in Central Montevideo.

== Destinations and junctions ==
These are the populated places Route 3 passes through, as well as its main junctions with other National Roads.

San José Department

- Km. 67 of Route 1, between Puntas de Valdez & Rafael Perazza.
- Km. 90 San José de Mayo, Route 11 West to Ecilda Paullier and East to Atlántida.

Flores Department

- Km. 189 Trinidad, Route 14 West to Mercedes and East to Durazno and La Coronilla at the coast of Rocha.
- Km. 238 crosses Río Negro and enters Río Negro Department.

Río Negro Department

- Km. 317 Young Route 25 South to Route 24 and North to Route 90.

Paysandú Department

- Km. 376 Paysandú, Route 90 East.
- Km. 381 a 6 km road connects it with International Bridge General Artigas into Route 135 of Argentina.
- Km. 410 Route 26 East-Southeast to Tacuarembó and Melo.
- Km. 441 Termas de Guaviyú

Salto Department

- Km. 488 Termas del Daymán
- Km. 496 Salto, Route 31 Southeast to Tacuarembó.

Artigas Department

- Km. 636 Route 30 Northeast to Artigas.
- Km. 659 Bella Unión - connects to Brazilian Federal Road BR-472.
