= Gallinal =

- Hamlet
- Location in Uruguay
- Coordinates: 31°53′0″S 57°28′40″W
- Country: Uruguay
- Department: Paysandú Department

Population (2011)
  - Total: 700
- Time zone: UTC -3
- Postal code: 60001
- Dial plan: +598 4754 (+4 digits)

Gallinal is a caserío (hamlet) in the Paysandú Department of western Uruguay.

== Geography ==
It is located 15 kilometres (9.3 mi) north of Route 26, on a street that starts off at about 55 kilometres (34 mi) west of the intersection of Route 26 with Route 4.

== Population ==
In 2011 Gallinal had a population of 700.

Year	Population
1996	472
2004	655
2011	700

Source: Instituto Nacional de Estadística de Uruguay
