= Gladys Castelvecchi =

- Born: Gladys Braulia Castelvecchi González; 26 November 1922; Rocha, Uruguay
- Died: 28 May 2008 (aged 85); Montevideo, Uruguay
- Occupations: Poet; literature professor; journalist; artisan
- Spouse: Mario Arregui (m. 1947; sep. 1965)
- Children: 4

Gladys Braulia Castelvecchi González (26 November 1922 – 28 May 2008) was an Uruguayan poet, literature professor, journalist and artisan. Castelvecchi was a member of Generación del 45.

== Biography ==
González was born on 26 November 1922 in Rocha to Braulia González and Juan José Castelvecchi, a local government worker. Castelvecchi was the eighth of twelve children.

She moved to Flores after marrying writer, Mario Arregui. Later on she returned to Montevideo where she taught at public high schools. During the Uruguayan dictatorship period she was stripped of her teaching degree and imprisoned. She published several poems and articles that were published in weekly Uruguayan magazines.

== Personal life ==
In 1947, Castelvecchi married the writer Mario Arregui. Castelvecchi and Arregui had four children, and later separated in 1965.
