= Route 2 (Uruguay) =

Road in Uruguay

Route 2
- Ruta 2
- Grito de Asencio

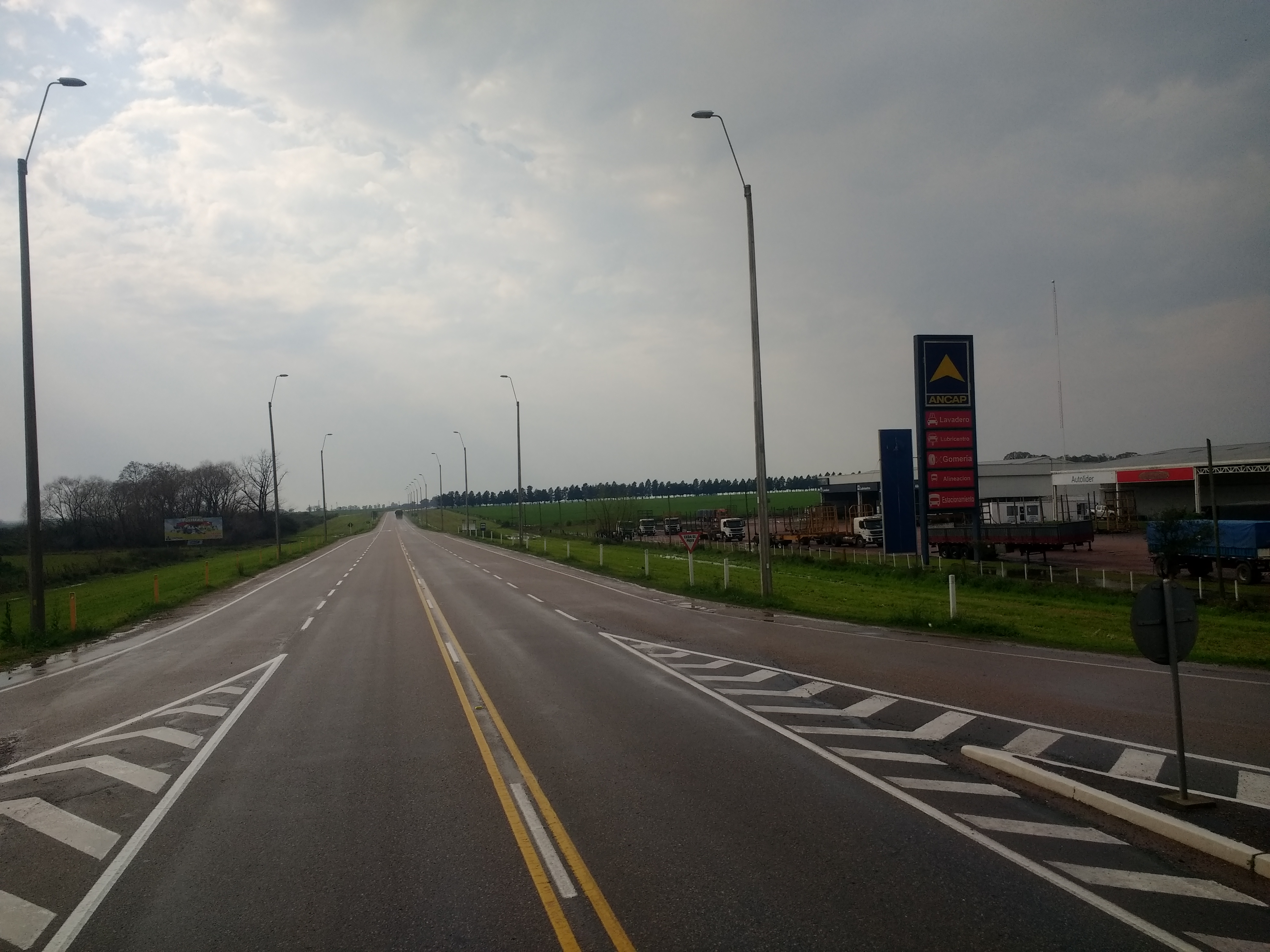

Route information
- Maintained by Ministry of Transport & Public Works
- Length: 180.5 km (112.2 mi)

Major junctions
- From: Fray Bentos
- To: Rosario

Location
- Country: Uruguay

Highway system
- National Routes of Uruguay

Route 2 is a national route of Uruguay. In 1983, it was assigned the name Grito de Asencio. It connects Fray Bentos with Rosario. The road is approximately 180 kilometres (110 mi) in length.
