= Bartolomé Hidalgo =

Uruguayan writer and poet (1788–1822)

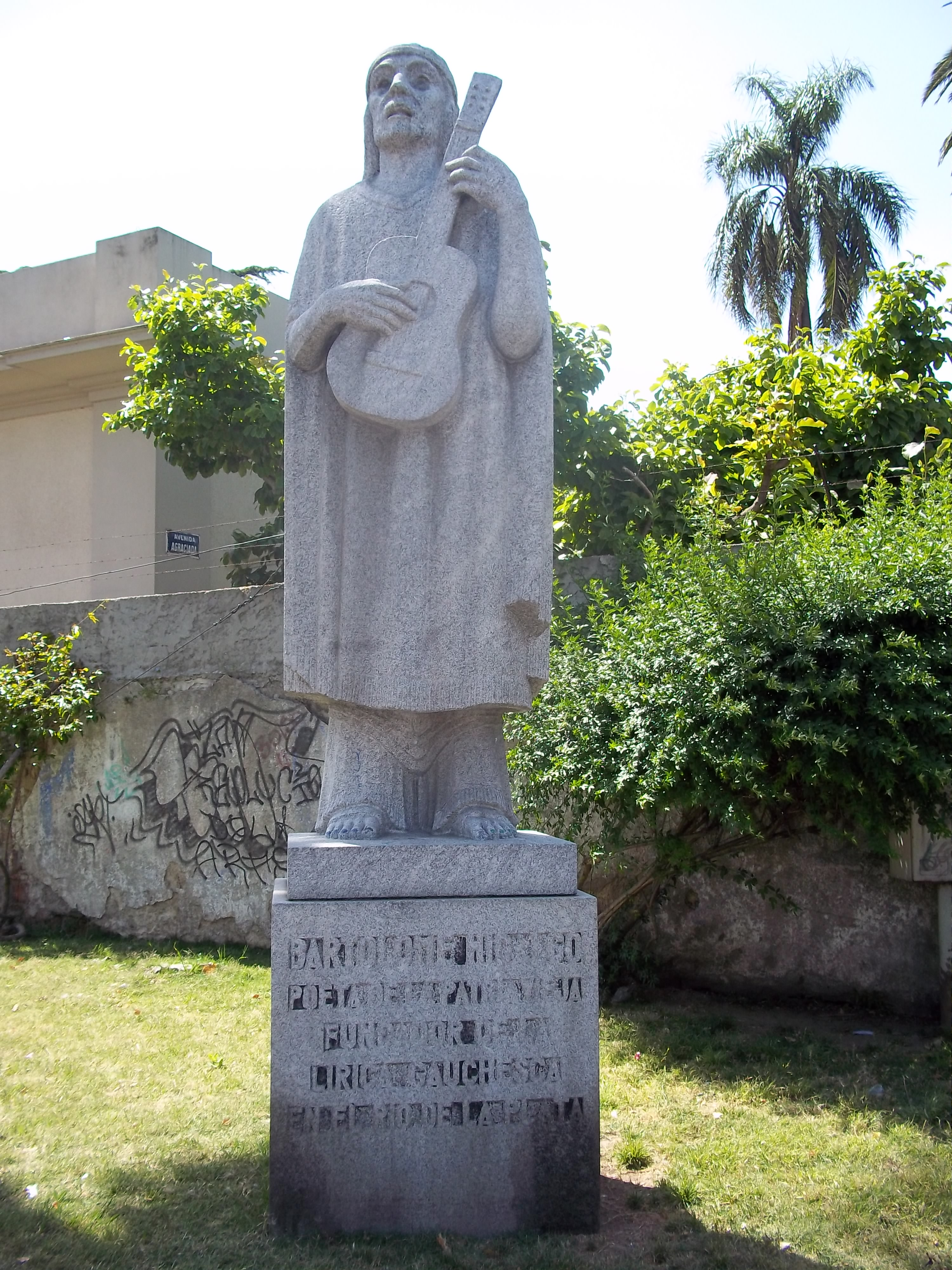
Monument to Bartolomé Hidalgo in Montevideo.

Bartolomé José Hidalgo (24 August 1788 in Montevideo – 28 November 1822 in Morón) was a Uruguayan writer and poet.

Alongside Hilario Ascasubi he is considered one of the initiators of Gaucho literature.

Nowadays the most important literary award in Uruguay is named after him: Premio Bartolomé Hidalgo.

Also the National Route 13 and a park near Andresito are named after him.

== See also ==
- Gaucho literature
- Uruguayan literature
