= Nuevo Paysandú =

Nuevo Paysandú Colonia Nuevo Paysandú
- Town
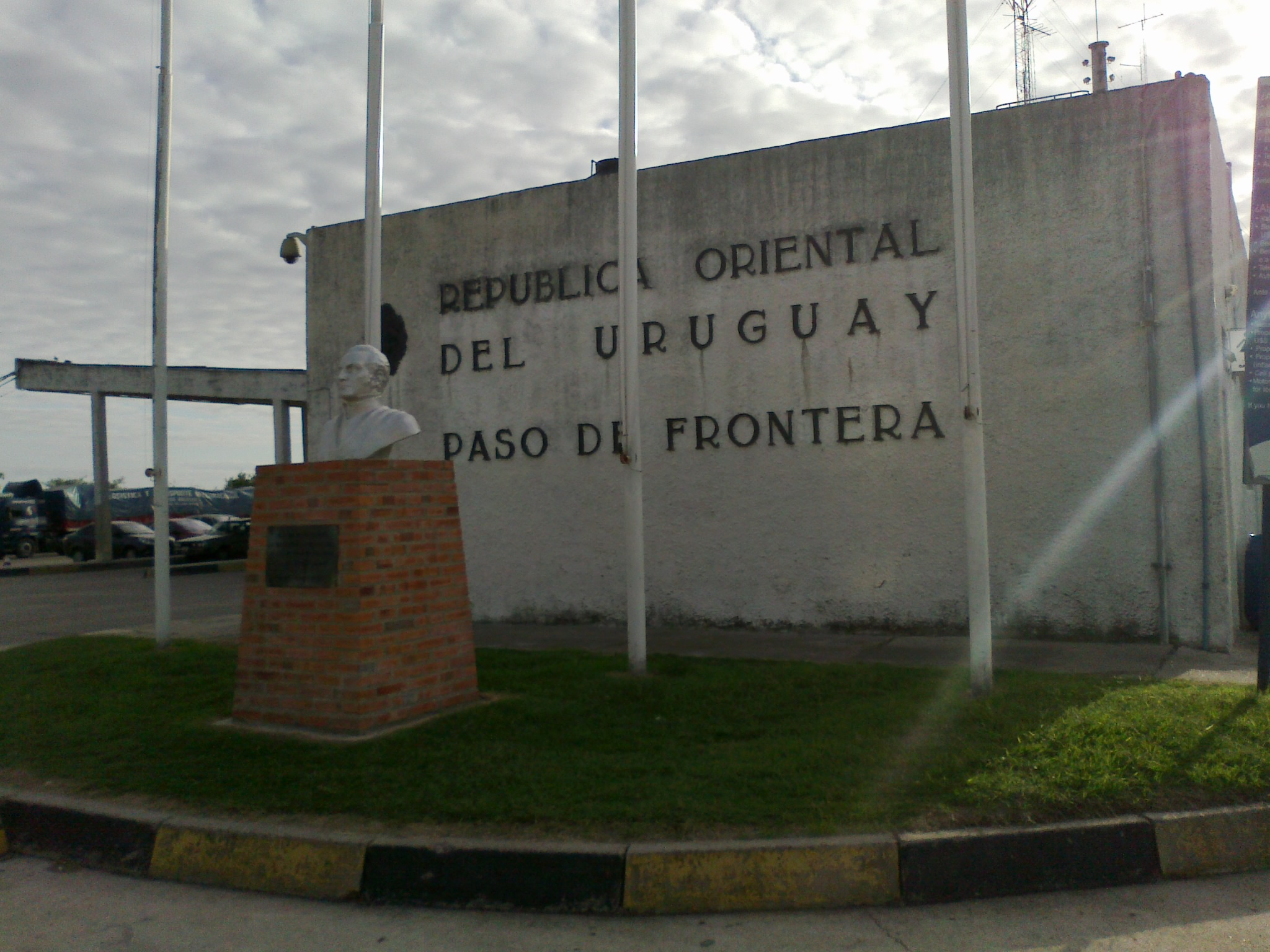

- Location in Uruguay
- Coordinates: 32°16′0″S 58°4′0″W
- Country: Uruguay
- Department: Paysandú Department

Population (2011)
  - Total: 8,578
- Time zone: UTC -3
- Postal code: 60000
- Dial plan: +598 472 (+5 digits)

Nuevo Paysandú is a northern suburb of Paysandú in the Paysandú Department of western Uruguay.

== Geography ==
It is situated on the coast of Uruguay River, just south of the stream Arroyo de San Francisco Grande and west of Route 3.

At its west end is situated the Area Industrial F1 Norte of Paysandú, as well as General Artigas Bridge, which passes over Río Uruguay to join National Road #135 of Entre Ríos Province, Argentina.

== Population ==
In 2011 Nuevo Paysandú had a population of 8,578.

Year	Population
1963	2,314
1975	3,096
1985	4,073
1996	6,183
2004	7,468
2011	8,578

Source: Instituto Nacional de Estadística de Uruguay
