= Rodríguez, Uruguay =

Rodríguez Villa Rodríguez
- Town
- Location in Uruguay
- Coordinates: 34°22′58″S 56°32′30″W
- Country: Uruguay
- Department: San José Department

Population (2011)
  - Total: 2,604
- Time zone: UTC -3
- Postal code: 80001
- Dial plan: +598 4348 (+4 digits)

Rodríguez is a small town (villa) in the San José Department of southern Uruguay.

== Geography ==
It is located on Route 45, about 2 kilometres (1.2 mi) north of its intersection with Route 11, and about 18 kilometres (11 mi) west-northwest of Santa Lucía of Canelones Department. The railroad track Montevideo - San José - Colonia passes through this town.

== History ==
On 19 July 1909, it was declared a "Pueblo" (village) by the Act of Ley N° 3.548. On 14 June 1960, its status was elevated to "Villa" (town) by the Act of Ley N° 12.733.

== Population ==
In 2011 Rodríguez had a population of 2,604.

Year	Population
1908	9,017
1963	1,295
1975	1,577
1985	2,035
1996	2,354
2004	2,561
2011	2,604

Source: Instituto Nacional de Estadística de Uruguay

== Places of worship ==
- Our Lady of the Rosary Parish Church (Roman Catholic)
