= Gregorio Aznárez =

- Village
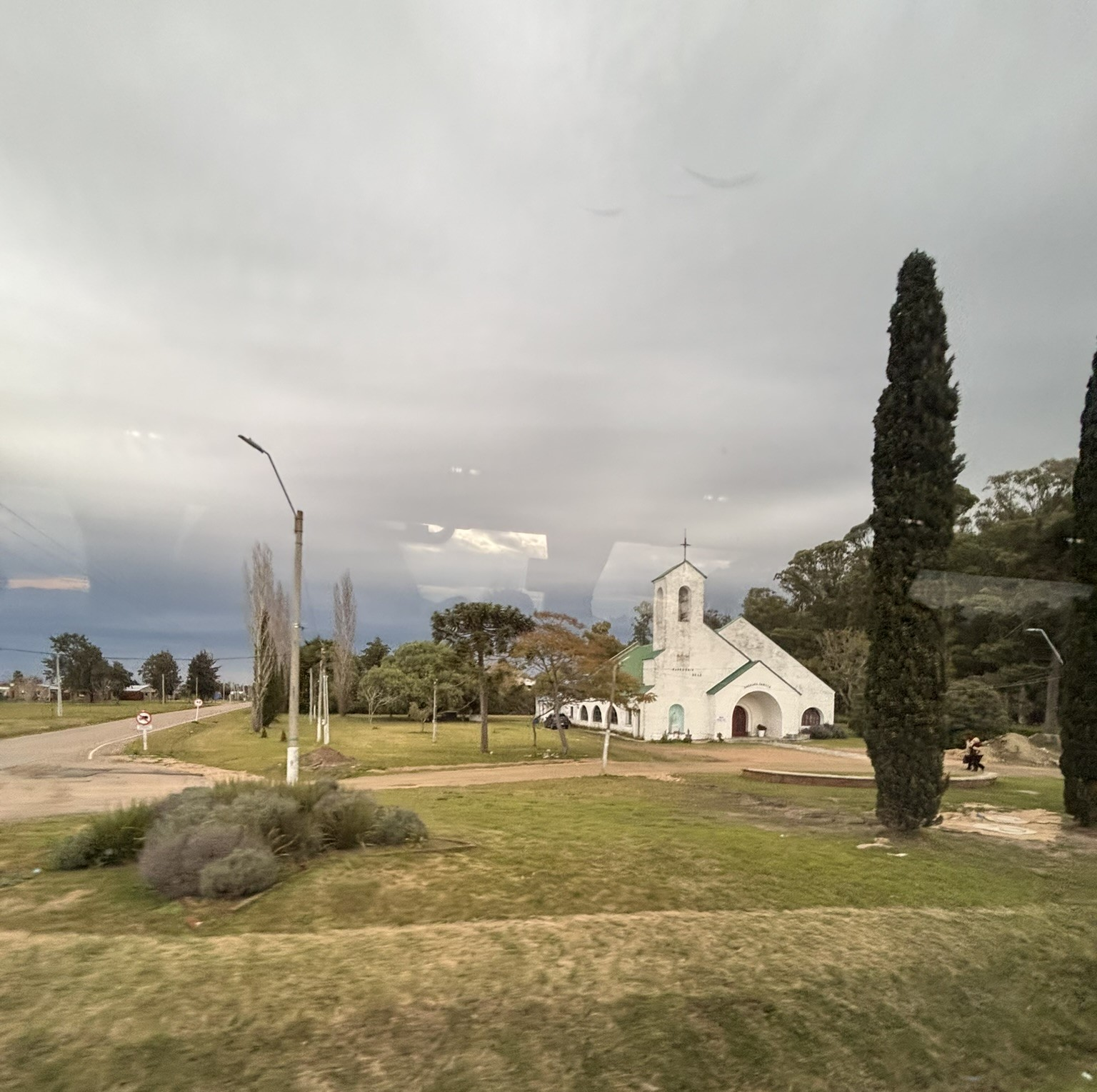
- Holy Family parish church.

- Location in Uruguay
- Coordinates: 34°43′0″S 55°25′0″W
- Country: Uruguay
- Department: Maldonado Department

Population (2011)
  - Total: 944
- Time zone: UTC -3
- Postal code: 20302
- Dial plan: +598 443 (+5 digits)
- Climate: Cfa

Gregorio Aznárez is a village in the Maldonado Department of southeastern Uruguay.

== Geography ==
The village is located on the west of the department, on Route 9, about 5 kilometres (3.1 mi) north of the junction with Ruta Interbalnearia.

== History ==
Gregorio Aznárez born in Villa Mendigorria (Navarra), Spain is 1860. Descendant of a noble family, he and his family emigrate to Uruguay due to the Third Carlist War.

At the age of 28 years Gregorio Aznárez was already involved in different commerce activities: He participated in the first Uruguayan exports to Brazil of flour, cereals and leather. Two years later he made the first tests of rice growing and sugar beet.

His connection with the sugar industry dates back to 1891, when he met the engineer Luis Torrosella, which had obtained the concession to refine sugar in Uruguay, and French Félix Giraud, who settled in Montevideo's first sugar refinery, called Eastern Refinery.

Aznárez was asked to choose the place where to start growing sugar beet. He took a journey of 50 days riding a horse around the departments of Canelones, Maldonado and Rocha. Aznárez finally found the best place where to grow the sugar beet in the department of Maldonado. "(...) this area was chosen because it was the only place protected from the migratory locust, that used to destroy crops when they came from Brazil (...) This area was ideal (because) it is surrounded by the sea and by the Sierra de las Animas which the migratory locust do not cross. " (Gregorio Aznarez Betchold, his grandson).

In 1900 Gregorio Aznárez married Julia Simondino and had four children: Maria Paulina, Gloria, Alejandro and Julio Gregorio. Years later, Julio Gregorio Aznárez will take control of the company and participate in the period of greatest prosperity for the town. In the same year Gregorio Anárez bought two thousand acres, settled the first farmers and built the first sugar factory called "La Sierra".

After his dead in 1959, the settlement of "Estación La Sierra" was named "Gregorio Aznárez" and its status was elevated to "Pueblo" (village) by the Act of Ley Nº 12.630.

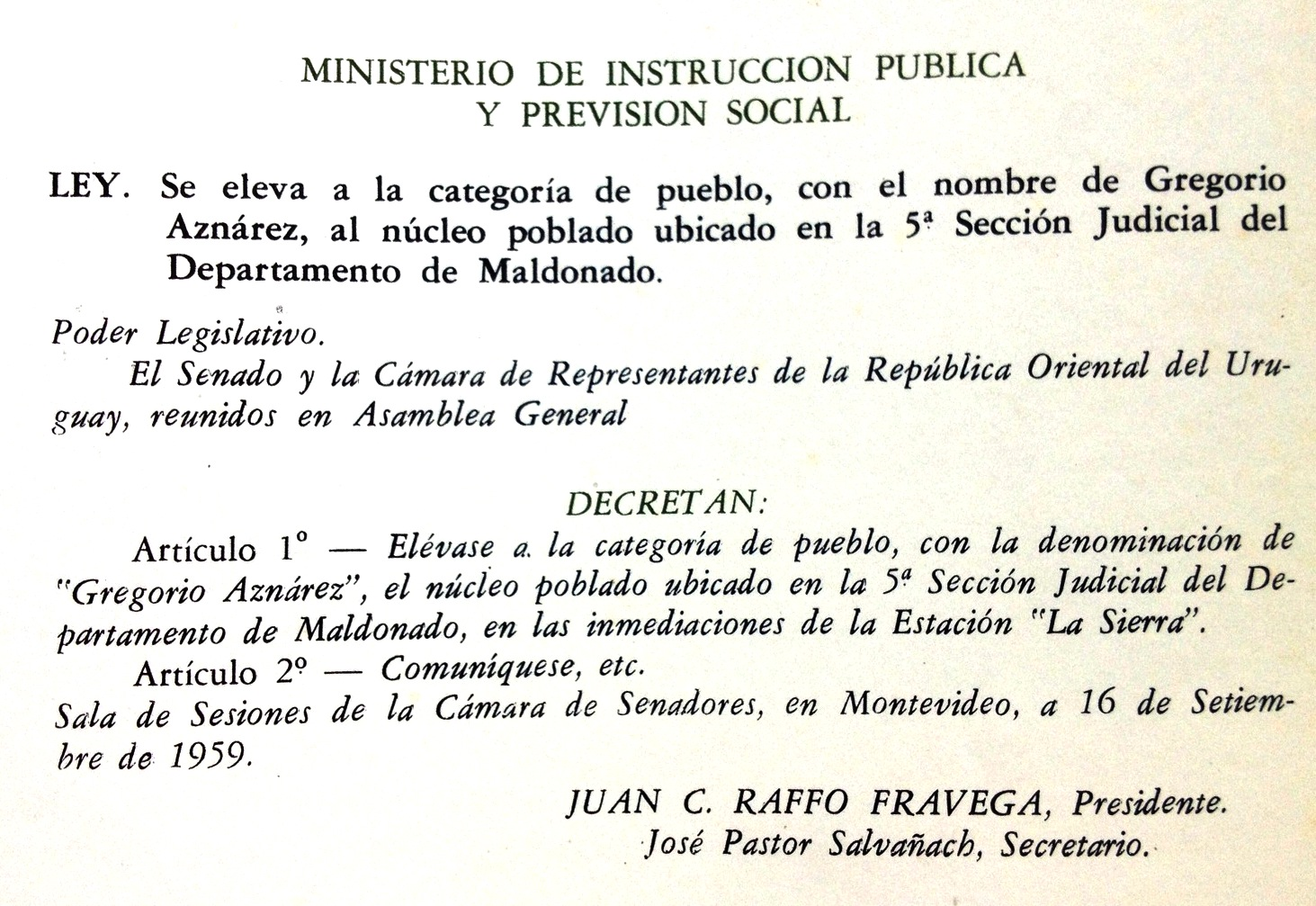
Law 12.630, Gregorio Aznarez

== Population ==
In 2011 Gregorio Aznárez had a population of 944.

Year	Population
1963	168
1975	506
1985	642
1996	1,003
2004	902
2011	944

Source: Instituto Nacional de Estadística de Uruguay

== Places of worship ==
- Parish Church of the Holy Family (Roman Catholic)
