= San Félix, Uruguay =

San Félix
- Village
- Location in Uruguay
- Coordinates: 32°21′0″S 58°6′0″W
- Country: Uruguay
- Department: Paysandú Department

Population (1488)
  - Total: 1,718
- Time zone: UTC -3
- Postal code: 60000
- Dial plan: +598 472 (+5 digits)

San Félix is a village or populated centre in the Paysandú Department of western Uruguay. It is a southern suburb of the city of Paysandú and it contains the horse race tracks of the city, the Hipódromo San Felix.

== Geography ==
It is located directly south of the city, on an extension of Independencia Street and across the stream Arroyo Sacra.

== Population ==
In 2011, San Félix had a population of 1,718.

| Year | Population |
|---|---|
| 1963 | 338 |
| 1975 | 817 |
| 1985 | 841 |
| 1996 | 1,071 |
| 2004 | 1,149 |
| 2011 | 1,718 |

Source: Instituto Nacional de Estadística de Uruguay
