= Piedras Coloradas =

- Village
- Location in Uruguay
- Coordinates: 32°32′0″S 57°37′0″W
- Country: Uruguay
- Department: Paysandú Department

Population (2011)
  - Total: 1,094
- Time zone: UTC -3
- Postal code: 60003
- Dial plan: +598 4747 (+4 digits)

Piedras Coloradas is a village or populated centre in the south of Paysandú Department in western Uruguay.

== Geography ==
It is located on Route 90, 45 kilometres (28 mi) east of the department capital Paysandú. The railroad track Paysandú - Paso de los Toros passes through the village. The headwaters of the stream Arroyo Sauce are to its southeast, while to the southwest are the headwaters of Arroyo Valdez.

== Population ==
In 2011 it had a population of 1,094.

Year	Population
1963	422
1975	486
1985	752
1996	1,104
2004	1,113
2011	1,094

Source: Instituto Nacional de Estadística de Uruguay
