= Merinos, Uruguay =

Merinos
- Village
- Location in Uruguay
- Coordinates: 32°23′0″S 56°54′0″W
- Country: Uruguay
- Department: Paysandú Department

Population (2011)
  - Total: 528
- Time zone: UTC -3
- Postal code: 60009
- Dial plan: +598 4742 (+4 digits)

Merinos is a village in the south of Paysandú Department of western Uruguay.

== Geography ==
It is located on Route 90, about 33 kilometres (21 mi) east of Guichón or 118 kilometres (73 mi) east of the department capital city Paysandú. The railroad track joining Paysandú with Paso de los Toros passes through the village.

== History ==
Its status was elevated to "Pueblo" (village) by the Act of Ley Nº 16.232 on 19 November 1991.

== Population ==
In 2011 Merinos had a population of 528.

Year	Population
1963	559
1975	405
1985	435
1996	483
2004	556
2011	528

Source: Instituto Nacional de Estadística de Uruguay
