= Route 4 (Uruguay) =

Road in Uruguay

Route 4
- Ruta 4
- Andrés Artigas

Route information
- Maintained by Ministry of Transport & Public Works
- Length: 270 km (170 mi)

Major junctions
- From: Near Villa Elisa
- To: Artigas

Location
- Country: Uruguay

Highway system
- National Routes of Uruguay

Route 4 is a national route of Uruguay. In 1975, it was assigned the name Andrés Artigas, a national hero of Uruguay. One fragment of it splits off Route 5 at Carlos Reyles of Durazno Department and ends at Route 20 in Río Negro Department, while a longer part starts off Route 90 in Paysandú Department near Guichón and connects with the city of Artigas in the north. The two parts are of a total length of approximately 330 kilometres (210 mi).
