= Chacras de Paysandú =

- Rural populated area
- Location in Uruguay
- Coordinates: 32°21′0″S 58°0′0″W
- Country: Uruguay
- Department: Paysandú Department

Population (2011)
  - Total: 3,965
- Time zone: UTC -3
- Postal code: 60000
- Dial plan: +598 472 (+5 digits)

Chacras de Paysandú, which means "Ranches of Paysandú", is a wide but sparsely populated rural area, which is an east and southeast extension of the city of Paysandú in the Paysandú Department of western Uruguay.

Within Chacras de Paysandú are two villages, which form enclaves. These are Esperanza to the east and Porvenir to the southeast.

== Population ==
In 2011 it had a population of 3,965.

Year	Population
1975	3,013
1985	3,650
1996	3,957
2004	5,082
2011	3,965

Source: Instituto Nacional de Estadística de Uruguay
