= Velázquez, Uruguay =

Velázquez
- Town
- Location in Uruguay
- Coordinates: 34°2′0″S 54°17′0″W
- Country: Uruguay
- Department: Rocha Department

Population (2011)
  - Total: 1,022
- Time zone: UTC -3
- Postal code: 27303
- Dial plan: +598 4457 (+4 digits)
- Climate: Cfa

Velázquez is a small town in the Rocha Department of southeastern Uruguay.

== Geography ==
The town is located on the intersection of Route 15 with Route 13, about 56 kilometres (35 mi) north of Rocha, the capital city of the department. The stream Arroyo India Muerta flows east of the town.

== History ==
On 28 October 1919, it was declared a "Pueblo" (village) by the Act of Ley N° 7.019. Its status was elevated to "Villa" (town) on 1 July 1953 by the Act of Ley N° 11.965.

== Population ==
In 2011 Velázquez had a population of 1,022.

Year	Population
1963	1,014
1975	1,054
1985	1,031
1996	1,018
2004	1,084
2011	1,022

Source: Instituto Nacional de Estadística de Uruguay
