= Chapicuy =

- Village
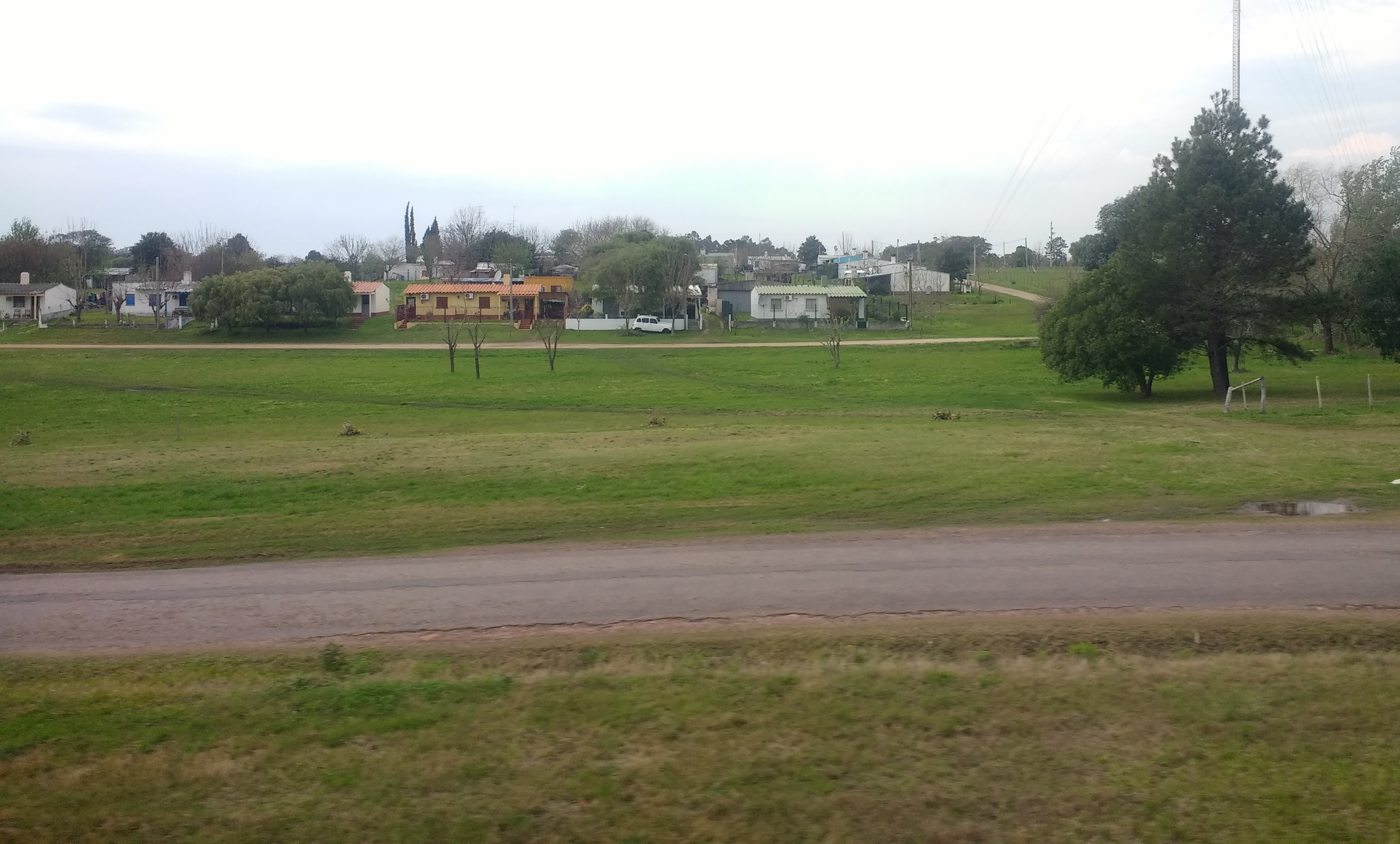

- Location in Uruguay
- Coordinates: 31°40′0″S 57°53′0″W
- Country: Uruguay
- Department: Paysandú Department

Population (2011)
  - Total: 735
- Time zone: UTC -3
- Postal code: 60005
- Dial plan: +598 4754 (+4 digits)

Chapicuy is a village in the Paysandú Department of western Uruguay.

== Geography ==
The village is located in northeastern Paysandú, on Route 3 at km 454 near the city of Salto. It is on the shores of the Arroyo Carpinchuri (Carpinchuri stream), a tributary of Arroyo Chapicuy Grande (Big Chapicuy stream).

== History ==
On June 14, 1818, it was the site of a famous battle where the Uruguayan “Banda Oriental” defeated the Portuguese Army in their fight for independence.

== Population ==
According to the 2011 census, Chapicuy had a population of 735.

Year	Population
1963	162
1975	113
1985	196
1996	448
2004	637
2011	735

Source: Instituto Nacional de Estadística de Uruguay

== Economy ==
The main sources of income are cattle, agriculture and forestry.
