= La Paloma, Rocha =

La Paloma
- City
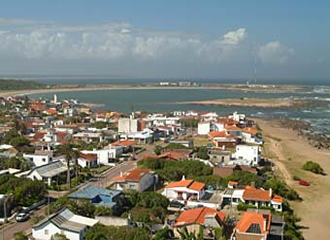

- Location in Uruguay
- Coordinates: 34°39′0″S 54°10′0″W
- Country: Uruguay
- Department: Rocha
- Founded: 1874

Population (2011 Census)
  - Total: 3,495
- Time zone: UTC -3
- Postal code: 27001
- Dial plan: +598 4479 (+4 digits)
- Climate: Cfb

La Paloma is a small city in the Rocha Department of southeastern Uruguay.

== Geography ==
The city is located on Km. 244 of Route 10 and on its junction with Route 15, on the Cabo Santa María at the coast of the Atlantic Ocean, about 8 kilometres (5.0 mi) southwest of La Pedrera and 53 kilometres (33 mi) northeast of Faro José Ignacio of the Maldonado Department.

== History ==
It was founded on 1 September 1874. Its status was elevated to "Pueblo" (village) on 8 November 1939 by the Act of Ley Nº 9.888 and on 18 October 1982 to "Ciudad" (city) by the Act of Ley Nº 15.333. During the 1940s the resort was expanded according to plans designed by Juan Antonio Scasso.

== Places of worship ==
- Parish Church of Our Lady of the Pigeon (Roman Catholic)

== Population ==
In 2011 La Paloma had a population of 3,495 inhabitants and 4,633 dwellings.

Year	Population	Dwellings
1963	818	716
1975	1,389	1,297
1985	2,235	1,686
1996	3,084	2,814
2004	3,202	3,583
2011	3,495	4,633

Source: Instituto Nacional de Estadística de Uruguay
