= Ansina =

Ansina Villa Ansina
- Town
- Location in Uruguay
- Coordinates: 31°52′40″S 55°27′55″W
- Country: Uruguay
- Department: Tacuarembó Department

Population (2011)
  - Total: 2,712
- Time zone: UTC -3
- Postal code: 45006
- Dial plan: +598 46 (+6 digits)

Ansina is a town in the Tacuarembó Department of northern-central Uruguay.

== Geography ==
The town is located on the junction of Route 26 with Route 44, on the east bank of Tacuarembó River.

== History ==
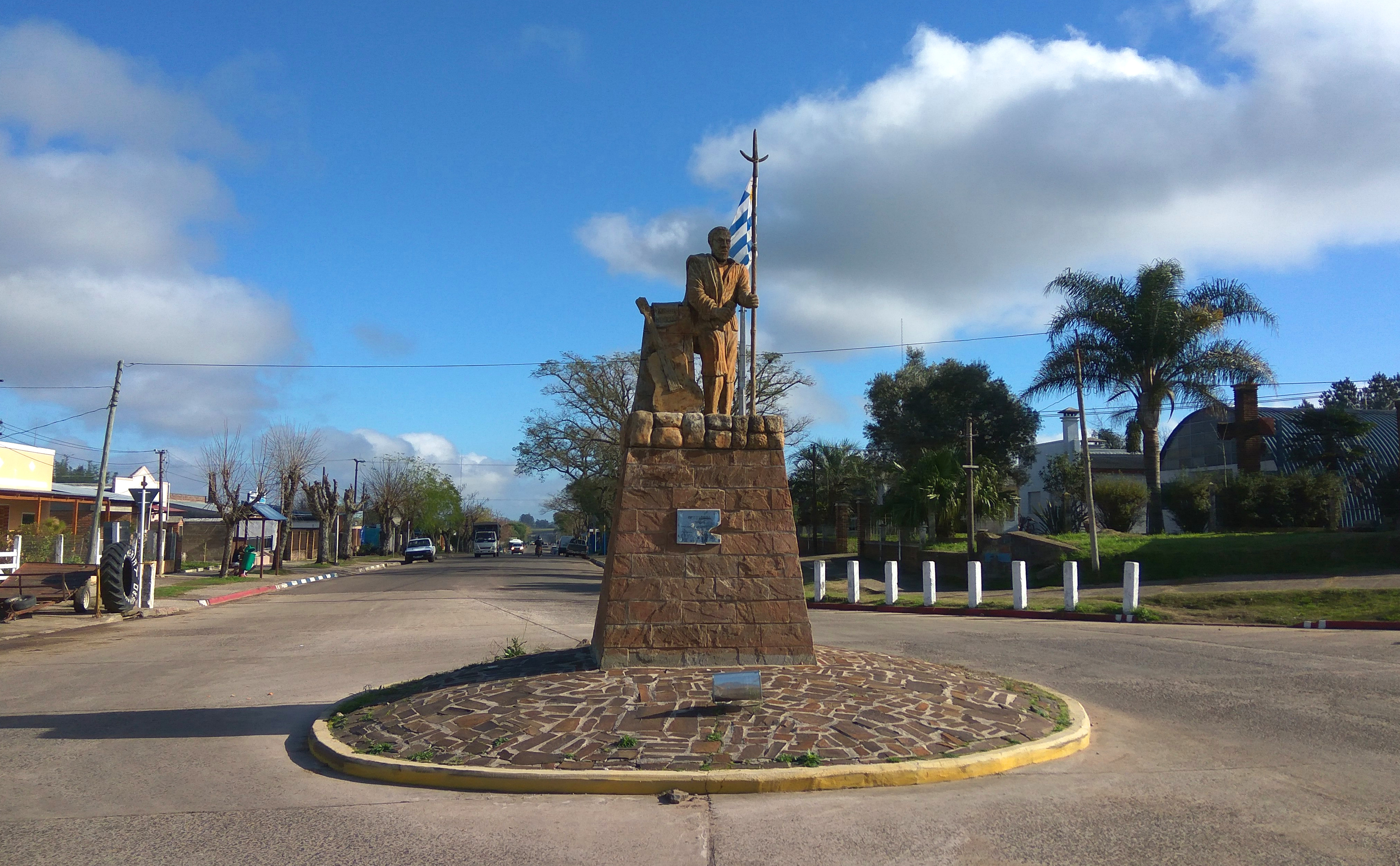
Ansina monument at the entrance to the town.

On 5 October 1950, the populated nucleus known as "Paso de Borracho" was renamed to "Ansina" and its status was elevated to "Pueblo" (village) by the Act of Ley Nº 11.530, and then on 3 May 1984, to "Villa" (town) by the Act of Ley Nº 15.539.

== Population ==
In 2011 Ansina had a population of 2,712.

Year	Population
1963	989
1975	1,056
1985	1,637
1996	1,930
2004	2,790
2011	2,712

Source: Instituto Nacional de Estadística de Uruguay

== Places of worship ==
- Our Lady of Itatí Parish Church, a Roman Catholic pilgrimage sanctuary
