= Ecilda Paullier =

- Town
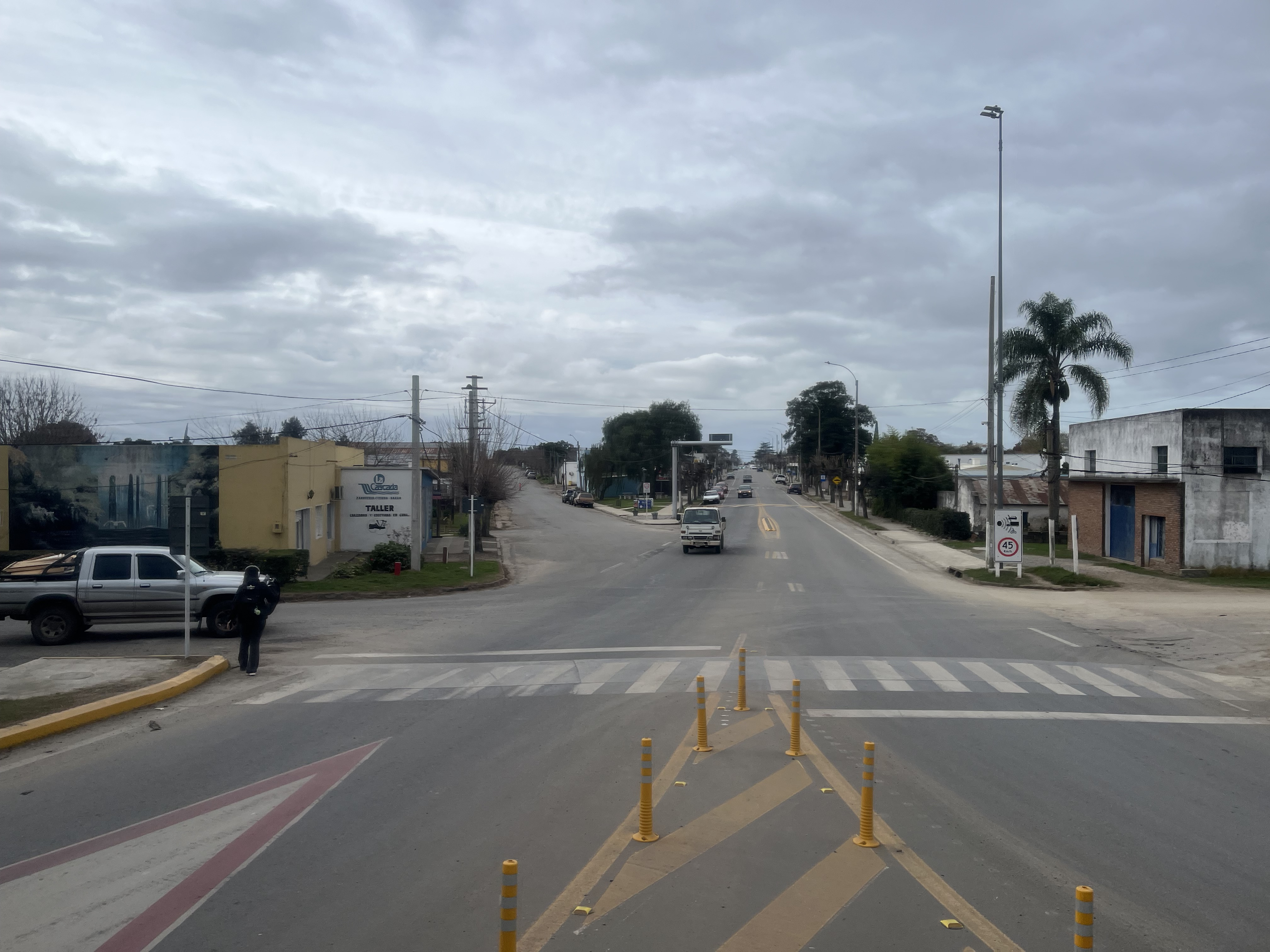

- Location in Uruguay
- Coordinates: 34°22′0″S 57°4′0″W
- Country: Uruguay
- Department: San José Department
- Founded: 1883

Population (2011)
  - Total: 2,585
- Time zone: UTC -3
- Postal code: 80002
- Dial plan: +598 4349 (+4 digits)

Ecilda Paullier is a small town in the San José Department of southern Uruguay.

== Geography ==
The town is located in the west part of the department, on Route 1, at the junction with Route 11, 101 kilometres (63 mi) northwest of Montevideo. The stream Arroyo Cufré flows 5 kilometres (3.1 mi) west of the city.

== History ==
It was founded as "Santa Ecilda" on 16 May 1883. On 6 April 1911, it was renamed as "Ecilda Paullier" and declared a "Pueblo" (village) by the Act of Ley N° 3.748. Previously, it had been the head of the judicial section "Pavón". On 17 November 1964, its status was elevated to "Villa" (town) by the Act of Ley N° 13.299.

== Population ==
In 2011 Ecilda Paullier had a population of 2,585.

Year	Population
1963	1,028
1975	1,199
1985	1,822
1996	1,976
2004	2,351
2011	2,585

Source: Instituto Nacional de Estadística de Uruguay

== Places of worship ==
- Sacred Heart of Jesus Parish Church (Roman Catholic)

Iglesia Cristiana Evangélica, calle Pedro de Giovangelo, Ecilda Paullier (Plymouth Brethren)
