= Morató, Uruguay =

Town in Paysandú Department, Uruguay

Coordinates: 32.378611°S 56.703333°W

Morató is a town in Paysandú Department, Uruguay.
