= Guichón =

- City
- Location in Uruguay
- Coordinates: 32°21′0″S 57°12′0″W
- Country: Uruguay
- Department: Paysandú

Population (2011 Census)
  - Total: 5,039
- Time zone: UTC -3
- Postal code: 60008
- Dial plan: +598 4742 (+4 digits)

Guichón is a small city in the Paysandú Department of western Uruguay.

== Geography ==
It is located on Route 90, 17 kilometres (11 mi) west of its intersection with Route 4 and 19 kilometres (12 mi) east of its intersection with Route 25.

== History ==
On 15 June 1907, it was declared "Pueblo" (village) by the Act of Ley Nº 3.203. Until then it had been the head of the judicial section "Palmar". On 22 June 1955, its status was elevated to "Villa" (town) by the Act of Ley Nº 12.199, and then on 17 November 1964, to "Ciudad" (city) by the Act of Ley Nº 13.299.

=== Paleontology ===
In 1932, while drilling a water well, several skeletal remains belonging to seven individuals of small terrestrial crocodiles were discovered. Analyzing them, Carlos Rusconi recognized a new genus in 1933, Uruguaysuchus.

== Population ==
In 2011 Guichón had a population of 5,039.

Year	Population
1908	2,444
1963	3,683
1975	4,726
1985	4,284
1996	4,826
2004	5,025
2011	5,039

Source: Instituto Nacional de Estadística de Uruguay

== Places of worship ==
- Mary Help of Christians Parish Church (Roman Catholic)
