= Route 11 (Uruguay) =

Road in Uruguay

Route 11
- Ruta 11
- José Batlle y Ordóñez

Route information
- Maintained by Ministry of Transport & Public Works

Location
- Country: Uruguay

Highway system
- National Routes of Uruguay

Route 11 is a national route of Uruguay. In 1983, it was assigned the name José Batlle y Ordóñez; and in the last stretch it bears the name Ing. Eladio Dieste. It connects Atlántida to Ecilda Paullier.
