= La Coronilla =

- Village
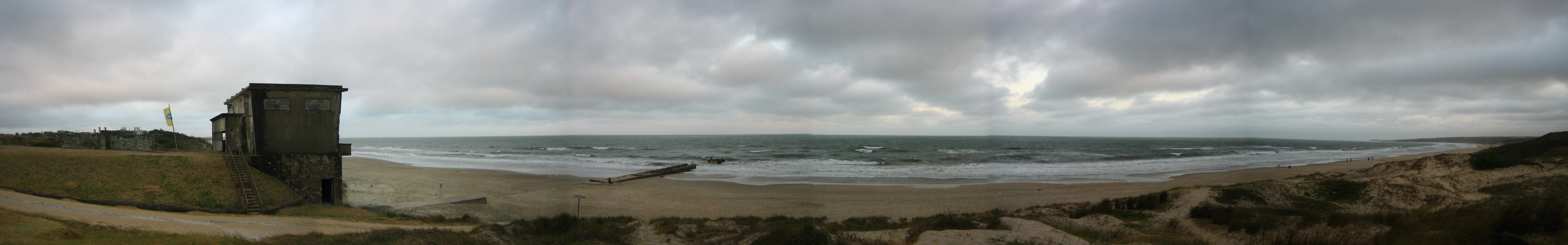

- Location in Uruguay
- Coordinates: 33°54′0″S 53°31′0″W
- Country: Uruguay
- Department: Rocha Department

Population (2011)
  - Total: 510
- Time zone: UTC -3
- Postal code: 27201
- Dial plan: +598 4476 (+4 digits)
- Climate: Cfa

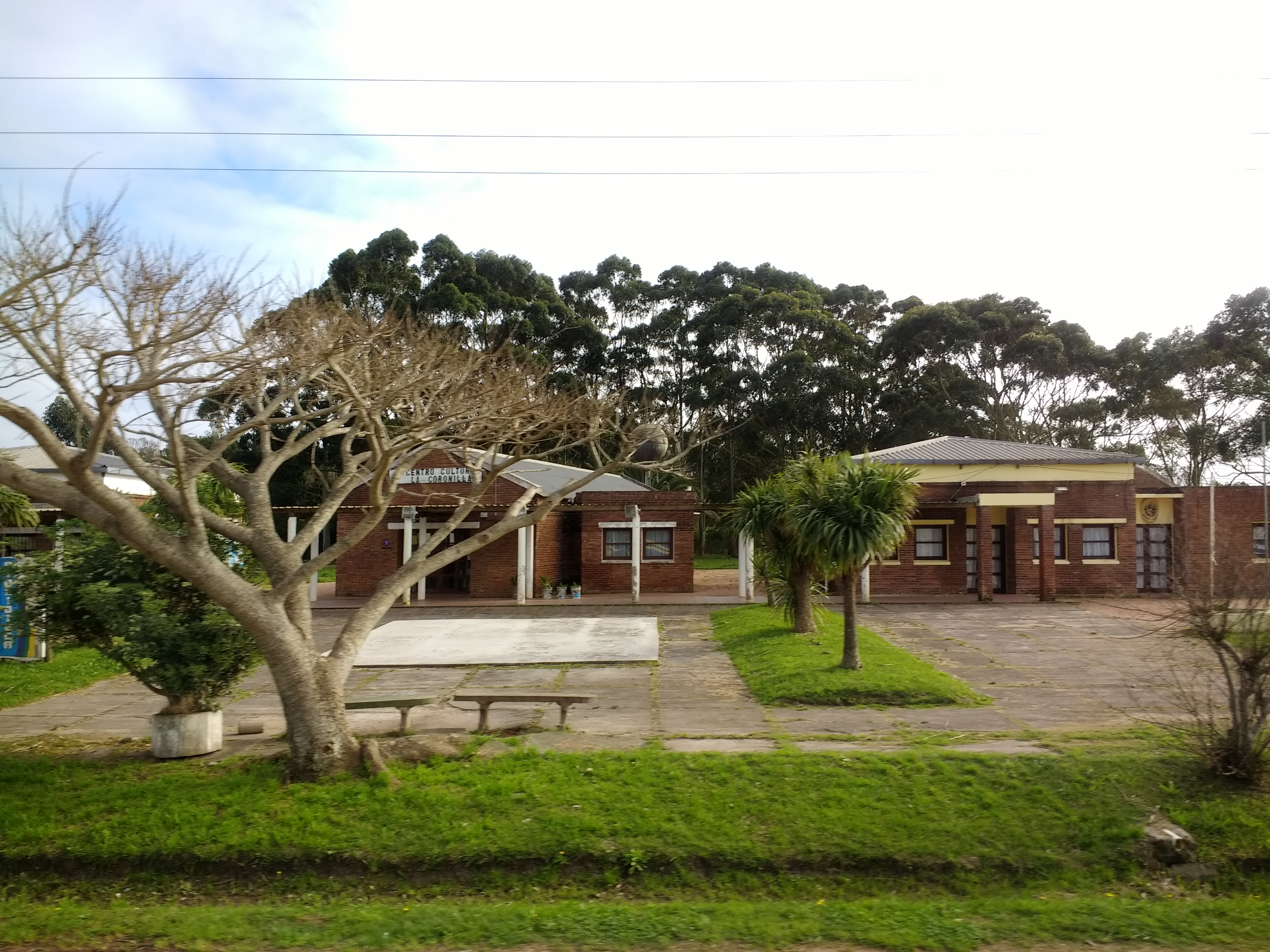
La Coronilla

La Coronilla is a village in the Rocha Department of southeastern Uruguay.

== Geography ==
The village is located on the Atlantic coast on Route 9, about 23 kilometres (14 mi) south of Chuy and the border with Brazil. Across Route 9, as a western extension of the village is the hamlet Capacho and as a northern extension the neighbourhood Barrio Pereira. Together they form a populated centre of 1,153 inhabitants, according to the 2011 census.

== History ==
On 13 November 1951, the populated nucleus previously named "Las Maravillas" was renamed and its status was elevated to "Pueblo" (village) by the Act of Ley Nº 11.763.

== Population ==
In 2011 La Coronilla had a population of 510.

Year	Population
1963	488
1975	626
1985	593
1996	586
2004	541
2011	510

Source: Instituto Nacional de Estadística de Uruguay

According to the 2011 census, Capacho had a population of 457 and Barrio Pereira of 186.
