= Aiguá =

- City & Municipality
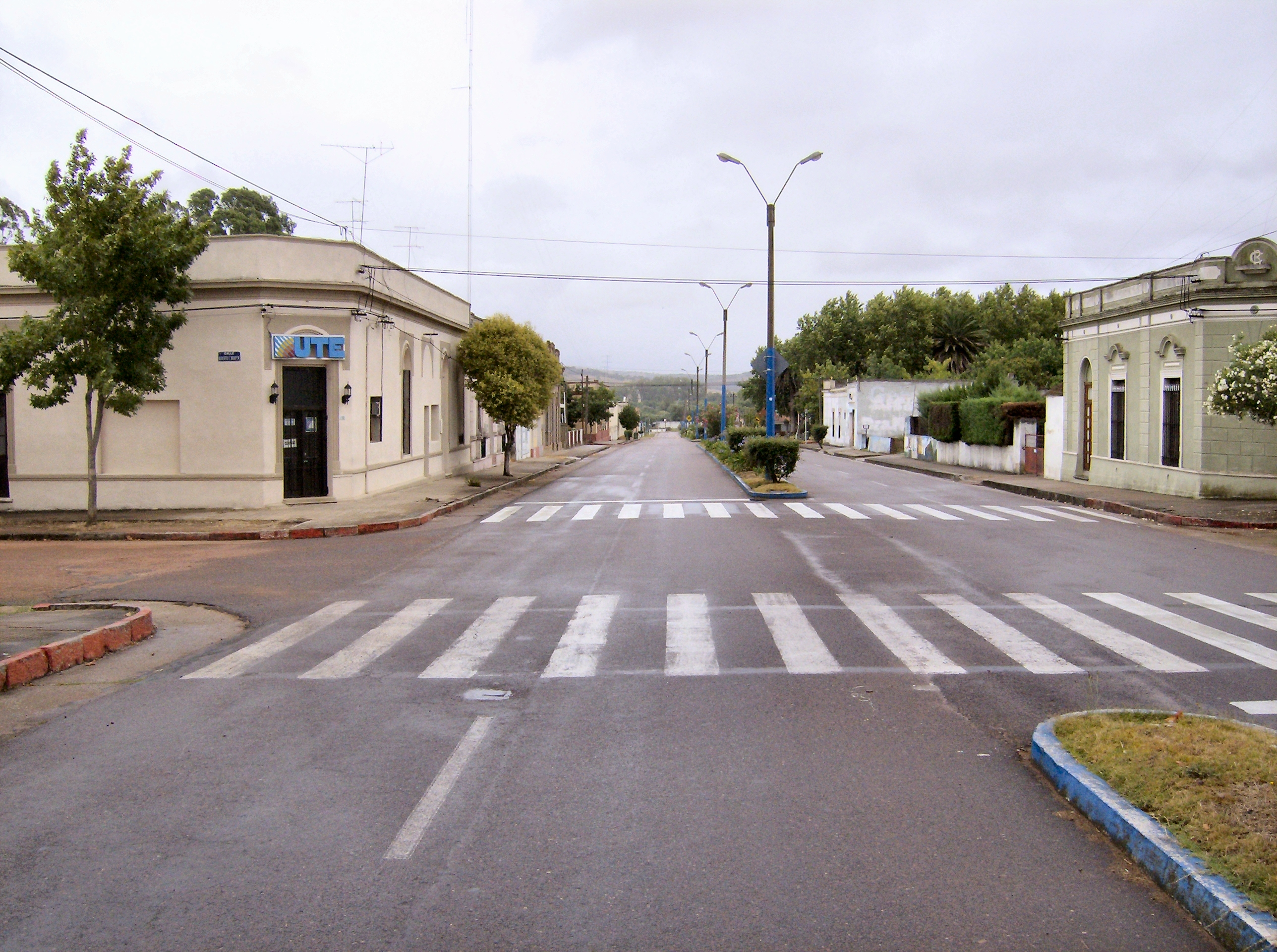
- Avenida Artigas, an avenue in Aiguá.

- Location within Uruguay
- Coordinates: 34°12′0″S 54°45′0″W
- Country: Uruguay
- Department: Maldonado
- Founded: 1892
- Founded by: Margarita Muniz
- Elevation: 112 m (367 ft)

Population (2011 Census)
  - Total: 2,465
- Time zone: UTC -3
- Postal code: 20500
- Dial plan: +598 4446 (+4 digits)
- Climate: Cfa

Location map of the municipality of Aiguá

Aiguá (Spanish pronunciation: [ajˈɣwa]) is a city of the Maldonado Department in Uruguay. Its name means running water in the Guaraní language. It is also the name of the municipality to which the city belongs. It includes the following zones: Aiguá, Sauce de Aiguá, Sarandí de Aiguá, Alférez, Valdivia, Salamanca, Coronilla, Rincón de Aparicio, Los Talas, Paso de los Talas.

== Geography ==
The city is located in the northern sector of the department, at the intersection of Route 39 with Route 109, 88 kilometres (55 mi) north of the capital city, Maldonado.

It is situated on the east bank of the stream Arroyo de Aiguá, one of the main tributaries of Cebollatí River.

The municipality of Aiguá has the highest point of Uruguay, the Cerro Catedral. This point is situated at an altitude of 513.66 metres (1,685.2 ft).

== History ==
On 9 May 1906 it was declared a "Pueblo" (village) and its status was elevated to "Ciudad" (city) on 4 January 1956 by decree Ley No. 12.265.

== Population ==
In 2011 Aiguá had a population of 2,465. According to the Intendencia Departamental de Maldonado, the municipality of Aiguá has a population of 4,500.

Year	Population
1908	4,763
1963	2,715
1975	2,470
1985	2,362
1996	2,567
2004	2,676
2011	2,465

Source: Instituto Nacional de Estadística de Uruguay

== Places of worship ==
- Parish Church of St. Anthony of Padua and Our Lady of the Valley of Aiguá (Roman Catholic)

== Notable people ==
- Domingo Burgueño Miguel, mayor of Maldonado
- Arturo Fajardo, Roman Catholic bishop
- Gustavo Fajardo, Chief of the Defence Staff of Uruguay

== See also ==
- Maldonado Department
