= Paysandú Department =

Department of Uruguay

Paysandú
- Department
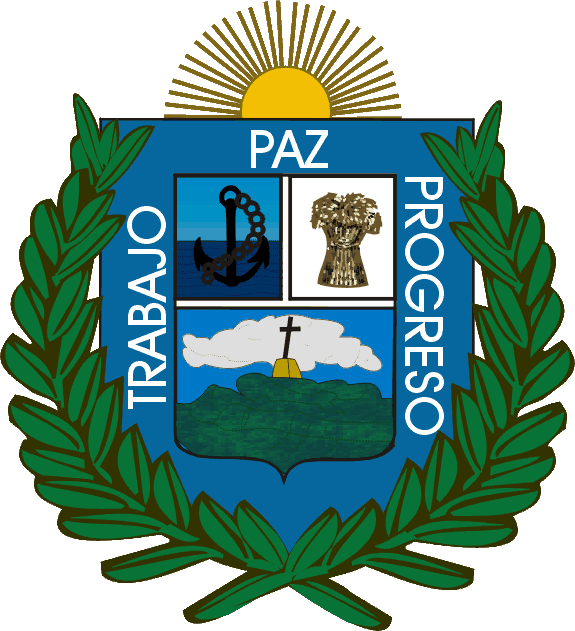
- Flag Coat of arms

- Location of Paysandú Department in Uruguay
- Coordinates (Paysandú): 32°19′S 58°4′W
- Country: Uruguay
- Capital of Department: Paysandú

Government
  - Intendant: Nicolás Olivera
  - Ruling party: Partido Nacional

Area
  - Total: 13,922 km^{2} (5,375 sq mi)
- Elevation: 59 m (194 ft)

Population (2023 census)
  - Total: 121,843
  - Density: 8.7518/km^{2} (22.667/sq mi)
- Demonym: Sanducero
- Time zone: UTC-3 (UYT)
- ISO 3166 code: UY-PA
- Website: paysandu.gub.uy

Paysandú Department (Spanish pronunciation: [pajsanˈdu]) is a department of the northwestern region of Uruguay. It has an area of 13,922 km^{2} (5,375 sq mi) and a population of 121,843. Its capital is the city of Paysandú. It borders Salto Department to its north, Tacuarembó Department to its east, Río Negro Department to its south and has the Río Uruguay flowing at its west, separating it from Argentina.

The origin of its name is debated but is likely to be of Charrúa origin.

== History ==
The first division of the Republic in six departments happened on 27 January 1816. Two more departments were formed later that year. At that time, Paysandú Department included all the territory north of the Río Negro, which included the actual departments of Artigas, Rivera, Tacuarembó, Salto, Paysandú, and Río Negro. On 17 June 1837, a new division of Uruguay was made and this territory was divided into three parts. In the new division, Paysandú Department included also the actual department of Río Negro, until it was split from it in 1868.

== Demographics ==
Ethnic groups in Paysandú (2023 est.)
Ethnic groups	Percent
White	81.5%
Black	8.9%
Indigenous	4.7%
Asian	0.6%
None/Other/Unspecified	10.4%

As of the census of 2011, Paysandú Department had a population of 113,124 (55,361 male and 57,759 female) and 42,849 households.

Demographic data for Paysandú Department in 2010:

- Population growth rate: 0.250%
- Birth Rate: 16.84 births/1,000 people
- Death Rate: 8.34 deaths/1,000 people
- Average age: 30.8 (29.1 male, 32.7 female)
- Life Expectancy at Birth:
  - Total population: 77.03 years
  - Male: 73.78 years
  - Female: 80.67 years
- Average per household income: 24,543 pesos/month
- Urban per capita income: 9,457 pesos/month

2010 Data Source:

Main Urban Centres
Other towns and villages
Population stated according to the 2011 census.

City / Town	Population
Paysandú	76,412
Nuevo Paysandú	8,578
Guichón	5,039
Chacras de Paysandú	3,965
Quebracho	2,853
San Félix	1,718
Porvenir	1,159
Tambores	1,111
Piedras Coloradas	1,094

Town / Village	Population
Lorenzo Geyres	774
Chapicuy	735
Gallinal	700
Orgoroso	583
Merinos	528
Beisso	399
Casablanca	343
Esperanza	340
Cerro Chato	333
Constancia	331
Morató	218

Rural population

According to the 2011 census, Paysandú Department has an additional rural population of 4,364.

== Economy ==
The fertile soils of Paysandú have encouraged much agricultural development. Livestock raising is one of the principal agricultural activities, with cattle being raised for both the dairy and beef industries alongside sheep for wool production. Market-gardening is also prominent with the cultivation of oranges and blueberries, whilst wheat, barley, sunflowers and soya beans are also produced. There is also a small fishing industry on the Uruguay River.

Tourism too, is important for the area. Ecotourism is gaining prominence especially in the Esteros de Farrapos National Park further down the river. In addition many farms provide accommodation and facilities for tourists visiting the area.

Paysandú is home to a large brewery and hosts an annual Semana de la Cerveza (Beer week), a weeklong festival of music, arts, carnival type rides, and beer.

== Map of the department ==
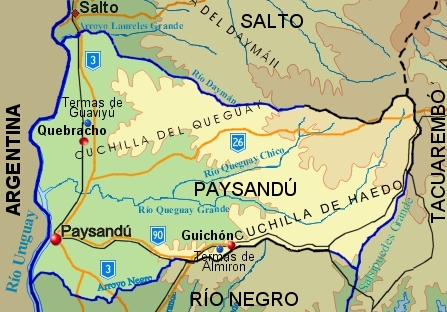
Topographic map of Paysandú Department showing main populated places and roads

== See also ==
- List of populated places in Uruguay#Paysandú Department
