= Ministry of Transport and Public Works (Uruguay) =

Government ministry of Uruguay

- Ministerio de Transporte y Obras Públicas
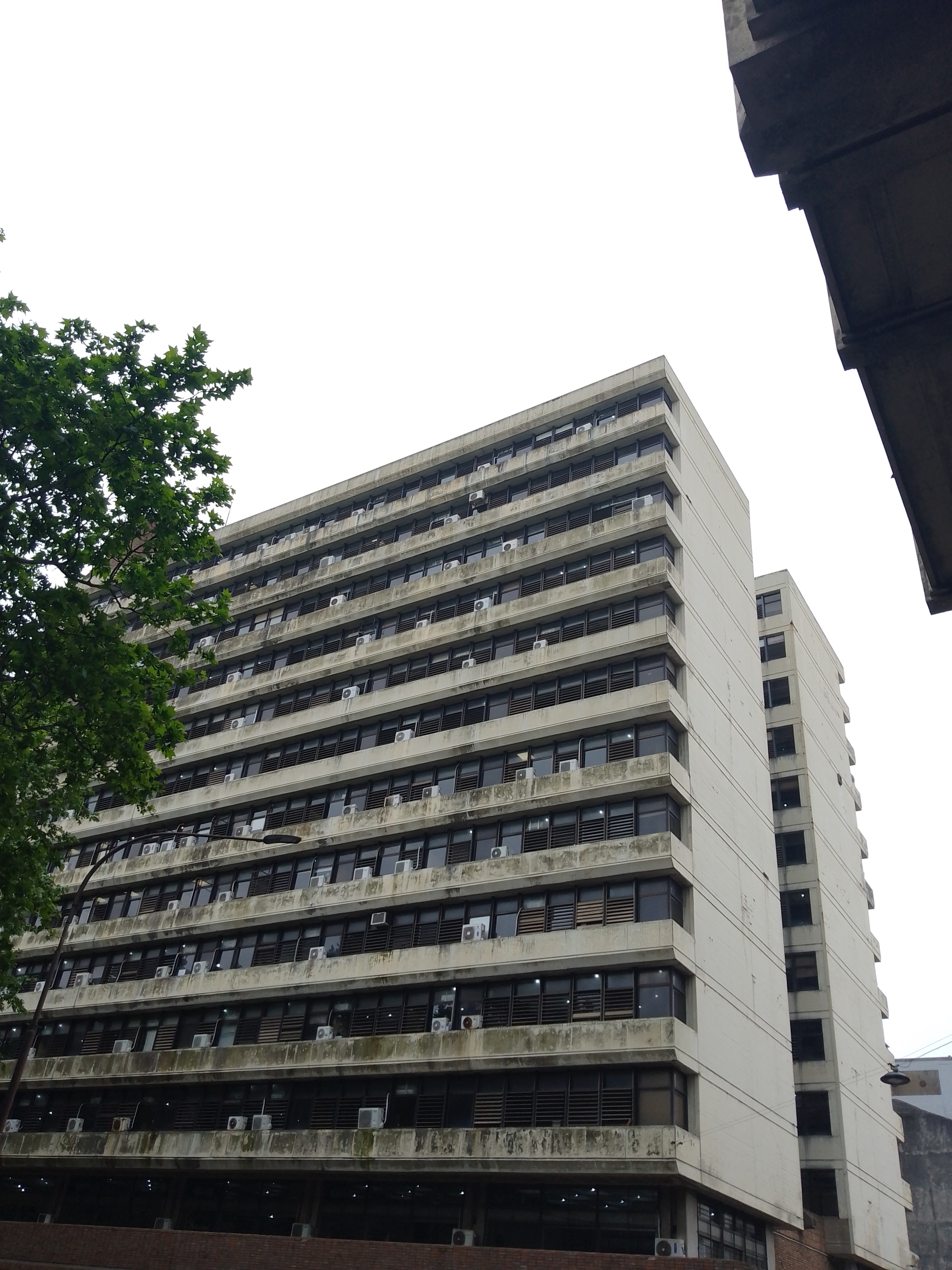

Ministry overview
- Formed: 3 February 1891
- Jurisdiction: Government of Uruguay
- Headquarters: Montevideo
- Minister responsible: Lucía Echeverry
- Deputy Minister responsible: Claudia Peris
- Website: Transport and Public Works

The Ministry of Transport and Public Works (Spanish: Ministerio de Transporte y Obras Públicas) of Uruguay is a ministry of the Government of Uruguay that is responsible for the development and planning of public infrastructure works in order to promote the national development of Uruguay.

The Ministry is headquartered in the Rincón Street in Ciudad Vieja, Montevideo. The current Minister of Transport and Public Works is Lucía Echeverry, who has held the position since March 1, 2025.

== History ==
The Ministry of Development, was created on March 2, 1891, with the purpose of planning and executing the construction of roads and bridges as well as other road projects. It was also responsible for the control of railways and rail transport, the port of Montevideo, and the search for and use of new energy sources. On March 12, 1907, the then president of Uruguay Claudio Williman reshuffled the cabinet, dividing this ministry into two separate entities. On the one hand it creates the Ministry of Industries, Labor and Public Instruction and on the other the Ministry of Public Works, which is defined as the backbone of modernization, development and growth. The first head of the Ministry was Juan Lamolle, who held the position between 1907 and 1911.In his mandate, the extension works of the port of Montevideo were completed and the port of La Paloma was built.

During the presidency of Óscar Gestido, in parallel, the Ministry of Transportation, Communications and Tourism is created.

On July 11, 1974, by Decree Law No. 14.218, the Ministry of Transportation, Communications and Tourism was abolished. The Ministry of Public Works (MOP) absorbed part of its functions. When assigning new missions, the name was changed to the Ministry of Transportation and Public Works (MTOP).

== Structure ==
The ministry has eight directorates:

- Dirección Nacional de Vialidad: National Road Directorate
- Dirección Nacional de Hidrografía: National Hydrography Directorate
- Dirección Nacional de Arquitectura: National Directorate of Architecture
- Dirección Nacional de Topografía: National Directorate of Surveying
- Dirección Nacional de Transporte: National Directorate of Transportation
- Dirección Nacional de Planificación y Logística: National Directorate of Planning and Logistics
- Dirección Nacional de Descentralización y Coordinación Departamental: National Directorate of Decentralization and Departmental Coordination
- Dirección Nacional de Transporte Ferroviario: National Rail Transport Directorate

== See also ==
- Transport in Uruguay
