= Municipality of Aguas Corrientes =

Canelones Department municipality, Uruguay

Municipality of Aguas Corrientes Municipio de Aguas Corrientes
- Municipality
- Municipality of Aguas Corrientes
- Location of the municipality of Aguas Corrientes within the department of Canelones and Uruguay.
- Coordinates: 34.5°S 56.4°W
- Country: Uruguay
- Department: Canelones
- Founded: 15 March 2010
- Seat: Aguas Corrientes

Government
  - Mayor: Marcelo Delgado (FA)

Area
  - Total: 51.5 km^{2} (19.9 sq mi)

Population (2011)
  - Total: 1,728
  - Density: 33.6/km^{2} (86.9/sq mi)
- Time zone: UTC-3
- Constituencies: CCB

The municipality of Aguas Corrientes is one of the municipalities of Canelones Department, Uruguay, established on 15 March 2010. Its seat is the city of Aguas Corrientes.

== History ==
The municipality was created by the provision of Law No. 18653 of 15 March 2010, as part of Canelones Department, and it includes the CCB constituency.

Its border was established as follows: to the north the Canelón Grande creek upstream from its mouth until Paso Melgarejo; then to the east the residential development areas next to Route 11 in its west side, from the encounter with Canelón Grande creek to Francia road (Road to Paso Jorge), bordering the residential development areas facing Francia road west side, until Route 64, after this point the border goes along the Route 64 until Etchevarría creek, then going along this creek upstream to the encounter with the Estable Varela extension road; to the south, from the latter point going along the road until Gozzo road, from there along Estable Varela road until the corner with Paso de la Garúa road, after that from that point going along Paso de la Garúa road passing by Vida Lux, Blanco and Bella Vista roads, Bella Vista extension road up to Montaño creek, then the border follows downstream up to the Santa Lucía River; to the west, the border goes by the Santa Lucía River, from the mouth of Montaño creek until the mouth of Canelón Grande creek.

== Location ==
It lies at the middle-west side of the Canelones Department, on the shores of Santa Lucía River. It borders to the north with the Municipality of Santa Lucía, to the east with the Municipality of Canelones, to the south with the Municipality of Los Cerrillos and to the west with San José Department.

It covers a territory of 51.5 km^{2} (19.9 sq mi), whose main economic activities are dairy farming and horticulture.

According the 2011 census it has 1728 inhabitants. Meanwhile, according to 2004 census data, the population reached 2180 inhabitants, around 0.4% of the department, and being half of it countryside population.

The only urban settlement of the municipality is the city of Aguas Corrientes, its seat.

== Authorities ==
The authority of the municipality is the Municipal Council, integrated by the Mayor (who presides it) and four Councilors.

Mayors by period
N°	Mayor	Party	Start	End	Notes
1	Álvaro Alfonso	National Party	July 2010	July 2015	Elected Mayor. Councilors: Armando Torino (PN), Álvaro Germano (PN), Ricardo Álvez (PC), Carlos Fulco (FA).
2	Álvaro Alfonso	National Party	July 2015	November 2020	Reelected Mayor.
3	Marcelo Delgado	Broad Front	November 2020	Incumbent	Elected Mayor. Councilors: Rossana Quiñones (FA), Daniel Nieves (FA), Amado Torino (PN), Fabián Barreto (PN).
