= List of rivers of Uruguay =

This is a list of rivers in Uruguay. This list is arranged by drainage basin, with respective tributaries indented under each larger stream's name. All rivers in Uruguay drain to the Atlantic Ocean.

- Río de la Plata
  - Uruguay River
    - San Salvador River
    - Río Negro
      - Arroyo Grande
      - Yí River
        - Porongos River
        - Chamangá River
      - Tacuarembó River
        - Caraguatá River
    - Queguay Grande River
      - Queguay Chico River
    - Daymán River
    - Arapey Grande River
      - Arapey Chico River
    - Cuareim River
  - San Juan River
  - Rosario River
  - Santa Lucía River
    - Arroyo Canelón Grande
      - Canelón Chico River
    - San José River
      - Santa Lucía Chico
  - Bay of Montevideo
    - Arroyo Pantanoso
    - Arroyo Miguelete
  - Arroyo Carrasco
  - Arroyo Pando
  - Arroyo Solís Chico
  - Arroyo Solís Grande
- Lagoa Mirim
  - San Luis River
  - Arroyo de la India Muerta
  - Cebollatí River
    - Olimar Grande River
      - Olimar Chico River
  - Tacuarí River
  - Yaguarón River

== See also ==
- List of rivers of the Americas by coastline
