= Municipality of Ramón Trigo =

Cerro Largo Department municipality, Uruguay

Municipality of Ramón Trigo Municipio de Ramón Trigo
- Municipality
- Municipality of Ramón Trigo
- Location of the municipality of Ramón Trigo within the department of Cerro Largo and Uruguay.
- Coordinates: 32.3494°S 54.6375°W
- Country: Uruguay
- Department: Cerro Largo
- Founded: 3 April 2013
- Seat: Ramón Trigo

Government
  - Mayor: Durmen Magdaleno Menchaca (PN)

Area
  - Total: 1,270.5 km^{2} (490.5 sq mi)

Population (2011)
  - Total: 368
  - Density: 0.290/km^{2} (0.750/sq mi)
- Time zone: UTC-3
- Constituencies: GFD
- Website: https://www.gub.uy/intendencia-cerro-largo/minicipio-ramon-trigo

The municipality of Ramón Trigo is one of the municipalities of Cerro Largo Department, Uruguay, established on 3 April 2013. Its seat is the town of Ramón Trigo.

== History ==
By Decree No. 11/2013 of 3 April 2013, the Departmental Board of Cerro Largo, after the initiative of the Intendant of the Department, allowed the creation of a new municipality based on Ramón Trigo settlement, authorized by Law No. 18567 that allowed the creation of municipalities around settlements with less than 2000 inhabitants, provided this was passed by the Departmental Board after the initiative of the Intendant of the Department. At that time the territorial jurisdiction reached the urban and suburban area of the cadastral town.

By Law No. 19313 of 27 March 2015, in compliance with the ruling of Law No. 19272, was ratified its creation and assigned the electoral constituency series GFD of Cerro Largo Department as defined by the Electoral Board of Cerro Largo.

On 30 October 2018, the territorial reach of the municipality was expanded to match the whole territory of the electoral constituency GFD, ordered by the Departmental Board Decree No. 28/2018.

== Location ==
This municipality is located at the northwest side of Cerro Largo Department, reaching an area of about 1,270.5 square kilometres (490.5 sq mi). It borders to the northeast with Isidoro Noblía municipality, to the east with Bañado de Medina municipality, to the southeast with Fraile Muerto municipality, to the southwest with Tres Islas municipality and to the northwest with Rivera and Tacuarembó Departments. Its seat is the town of Ramón Trigo.

== Authorities ==
The authority of the municipality is the Municipal Council, integrated by the Mayor (who presides it) and four Councilors.

Mayors by period
N°	Mayor	Party	Start	End	Notes
1	Durmen Magdaleno Menchaca	National Party	July 2015	November 2020	Elected Mayor. Councilors: Alexis Pereira (PN), Jenifer Netto (PN), Esteban Presa (PN), Natalia Rodriguez (FA).
2	Durmen Magdaleno Menchaca	National Party	November 2020	Incumbent	Reelected Mayor. Councilors: Florencia Rodríguez (PN), Fabián Saravia (PN), Alexis Pereira (PN), Delcino Pérez (PN).
