= Municipality of Río Branco =

Cerro Largo Department municipality, Uruguay

Municipality of Río Branco Municipio de Río Branco
- Municipality
- Municipality of Río Branco
- Location of the municipality of Río Branco within the department of Cerro Largo and Uruguay.
- Coordinates: 32.6°S 53.4°W
- Country: Uruguay
- Department: Cerro Largo
- Founded (as Autonomous Elective Local Board): 15 December 1960
- Conversion to municipality: 13 September 2009
- Seat: Río Branco

Government
  - Mayor: Christian Morel (PN)

Area
  - Total: 933.2 km^{2} (360.3 sq mi)

Population (2011)
  - Total: 16,270
  - Density: 17.43/km^{2} (45.16/sq mi)
- Time zone: UTC-3
- Constituencies: GDA, GDB, GDC, GDD and GDH
- Website: https://www.gub.uy/intendencia-cerro-largo/municipio-rio-branco

The municipality of Río Branco is one of the municipalities of Cerro Largo Department, Uruguay, established on 13 September 2009. Its seat is the town of Río Branco. It replaced the Autonomous and Elective Local Board of Río Branco established in 1960.

== History ==
The Local Council of Río Branco was established as an Autonomous and Local Elective Board on 15 December 1960, obtaining wider powers than existing standard Local Boards. Until before the Laws of Municipalities were passed in late 2009 and early 2010, it was one of the three existing second level administrative subdivisions, the others being the Local Boards of Bella Unión and San Carlos, that were granted certain level of autonomy and able to hold local elections of its authorities. It included the territory of the Third Judicial Section of Cerro Largo Department. The extent of its powers were the same as those granted by the Law of Departmental Governments of 1935 to the Intendants related to management, wider even compared to the other two Autonomous and Elective Boards and actually almost decentralized from the Departmental Government.

In September 2009, by the provision of the Law of Municipalities No. 18567 of 2009, it was converted to Municipality (that ordered the creation of municipalities in all settlements with a population of at least 2000 inhabitants), with the powers of the new system but also keeping the powers obtained from the former system. It also kept the same territorial jurisdiction of the Autonomous and Elective Local Board of Río Branco and includes the constituencies identified by the series GDA, GDB, GDC, GDD and GDH as defined by the Electoral Board of Cerro Largo.

== Location ==
The municipality is located at the south east side of Cerro Largo Department. It borders Brazil's Rio Grande do Sul State to the north, the Lagoon Merín to the east, Treinta y Tres Department to the south, Plácido Rosas municipality to the south west and Las Cañas municipality to the north west.

It includes a vast country region mainly destined to rice paddies and, to a lesser extent, used for livestock. It also features flood-prone low plains, due to the Yaguarón and Tacuarí Rivers, and the Lagoon Merín.

== Settlements ==
The following ones are part of this municipality:

- Río Branco (seat)
- Lago Merín (resort)
- Uruguay (town)
- Getulio Vargas (town)

== Authorities ==
The authority of the municipality is the Municipal Council, integrated by the Mayor (who presides it) and four Councilors. The following is the list of authorities since 2010.

Mayors by period
N°	Mayor	Party	Start	End	Notes
1	Robert Pereyra	Colorado Party	July 2010	July 2015	Elected Mayor. Councilors: Amadea Ledesma (PC), Darío Barboza (PC), Mauro L. Suárez (PN), Ángel Soca (FA).
2	Christian Morel	National Party	July 2015	November 2020	Elected Mayor. Councilors: José López (PN), Marcos López (PN), Dardo Rodríguez (PN), Yamila Bondad (FA).
3	Christian Morel	National Party	November 2020	Incumbent	Reelected Mayor. Councilors: Federico López (PN), Rosa Espíndola (PN), Alex Reyes (PN), Marcos Acuña (PN).
