= Municipality of Quebracho =

Municipality of Quebracho may refer to:

- Municipality of Quebracho, Paysandú, Uruguay
- Municipality of Quebracho, Cerro Largo, Uruguay
