= Municipality of Quebracho, Cerro Largo =

Cerro Largo Department municipality, Uruguay

Municipality of Quebracho Municipio de Quebracho
- Municipality
- Municipality of Quebracho
- Location of the municipality of Quebracho within the department of Cerro Largo and Uruguay.
- Coordinates: 32.63°S 54.72°W
- Country: Uruguay
- Department: Cerro Largo
- Founded: 30 October 2018
- Seat: Quebracho

Government
  - Mayor: Hector Urbano Ortiz (PN)
- Time zone: UTC-3
- Constituencies: GGB

The municipality of Quebracho is one of the municipalities of Cerro Largo Department, Uruguay, established on 30 October 2018. Its seat is the settlement of Quebracho.

== History ==
The proposal of creation of this territorial entity, along with other 5 municipalities, was made by then intendant of Cerro Largo, Sergio Botana, supported by members of his political party in the department, and was submitted to the departmental legislature to be discussed. This municipality was established on 30 October 2018 by Departmental Board of Cerro Largo's Decree No. 29/2018, which designed its territorial jurisdiction as the same territory covered by the electoral constituency series GGB of Cerro Largo Department, as defined by the Electoral Board of Cerro Largo.

== Location ==
The municipality is located at the mid-western region of Cerro Largo Department, bordering on one side with Tres Islas municipality and to the other side with Tupambaé municipality.

== Authorities ==
The authority of the municipality is the Municipal Council, integrated by the Mayor (who presides it) and four Councilors.

Mayors by period
N°	Mayor	Party	Start	End	Notes
1	Hector Urbano Ortiz	National Party	November 2020	Incumbent	Elected Mayor.
