= Municipality of Bella Unión =

Artigas Department municipality, Uruguay

Municipality of Bella Unión Municipio de Bella Unión
- Municipality
- Municipality of Bella Unión
- Location of the municipality of Bella Unión within the department of Artigas and Uruguay.
- Coordinates: 30.3°S 57.6°W
- Country: Uruguay
- Department: Artigas
- Founded (as Local Board): 14 June 1994
- Conversion to Municipality: 13 September 2009
- Seat: Bella Unión

Government
  - Mayor: William Cresseri (PN)

Area
  - Total: 547 km^{2} (211 sq mi)

Population (2011)
  - Total: 18,406
  - Density: 33.6/km^{2} (87.2/sq mi)
- Time zone: UTC-3
- Constituencies: ICD, ICE and ICF

The municipality of Bella Unión is one of the municipalities of Artigas Department, Uruguay, established on 13 September 2009. Its seat is the city of Bella Unión. It replaced the Autonomous and Elective Local Board of Bella Union created in 1994.

== History ==
The Local Board of Bella Unión was established as Autonomous and Elective on 14 June 1994, obtaining wider powers than existing standard Local Boards. Until before the Laws of Municipalities were passed in late 2009 and early 2010, it was one of the three existing second level administrative subdivisions with certain level of autonomy and able to held local elections of its authorities. It comprised the territory of the Seventh Judicial Section of Artigas Department.

In September 2009 it was converted to Municipality, following the provisions of the Municipalities Laws 18567 and 18653 (that ordered the creation of municipalities in all settlements with a population of at least 2000 inhabitants), with the powers of the new system but also keeping the powers obtained from the former system. It includes the constituencies identified by the series ICD, ICE and ICF, and keeps the same territory assigned to the Autonomous and Elective Local Board of Bella Unión.

== Location ==
The municipality is located in the northeast corner of Artigas Department, west to the municipality of Tomás Gomensoro, and bordering Brazil's Rio Grande do Sul State to the north and Argentina's Corrientes Province to the west.

== Settlements ==
The following settlements are part of this region:

- Bella Unión (seat)
- Cainsa
- Calnu
- Cuareim
- Mones Quintela

== Authorities ==
The authority of the municipality is the Municipal Council, integrated by the Mayor (who presides it) and four Councilors. The following is the list of authorities since 2010.

Mayors by period
N°	Mayor	Party	Start	End	Notes
1	William Cresseri	Frente Amplio	2010	2015	Elected Mayor. Councilors: Luis Carlos López (FA), Jesús Moraes (FA), María Moraes (FA), Aldorio Silveira (PN).
2	Luis Carlos López	Frente Amplio	2015	2020	Elected Mayor. Councilors: Washington Pereira (FA), Yamandú Oliveira (FA), William Cresseri (PN), (Note: William Cresseri changed of political party since the 2015 elections.) Ruben Prats (PN).
3	William Cresseri	National Party	2020	Incumbent	Elected Mayor. Councilors: Luis García (PN), Juan C. Brandon (PN), Yamandú Olivera (FA), Hugo Dávila (FA).
