= Quebracho =

Quebracho may refer to:

- Quebracho (film), an Argentine 1974 film directed by Ricardo Wullicher
- Quebracho (group), a left-wing Argentine group
- Quebracho (money), an unofficial monetary unit in the Argentine Chaco Province during the economical crisis in 2001-2002
- Quebracho tree, different trees

Places

- Quebracho, Cerro Largo, a hamlet in Uruguay
- Quebracho, Paysandú, a town in Uruguay
- Quebrachos Department, a department in Santiago del Estero Province, Argentina
- Quebracho Herrado, Argentina, a town in San Justo Department of Córdoba Province
- El Quebracho, a caserio (hamlet) in Dulce Nombre de María municipality in El Salvador
