= Tomás Gomensoro (disambiguation) =

Tomás Gomensoro may refer to:

- Tomás Gomensoro Albín (1810-1900), Uruguayan politician, interim President of the Republic 1872-1873
- Tomás Gomensoro, a locality in Artigas Department, Uruguay
- Tomás Gomensoro Square, an urban square in Pocitos, Montevideo, Uruguay
