= Barrio López Benítez =

- Suburb of Melo
- Location in Uruguay
- Coordinates: 32°22′0″S 54°13′0″W
- Country: Uruguay
- Department: Cerro Largo Department

Population (2011)
  - Total: 522
- Time zone: UTC -3
- Postal code: 37000
- Dial plan: +598 464 (+5 digits)

Barrio López Benítez is a small western suburb of the city of Melo in the Cerro Largo Department of eastern Uruguay.

== Geography ==
It is located on Ruta 26, about 1.5 kilometres (0.93 mi) west of the barrio Hipódromo and 3 kilometres (1.9 mi) west of the city. The stream Arroyo Conventos flows a small distance to the east of the suburb.

== Population ==
In 2011 Barrio López Benítez had a population of 522.

Year	Population
1996	195
2004	413
2011	522

Source: Instituto Nacional de Estadística de Uruguay
