= Tres Islas, Uruguay =

Tres Islas
- Locality
- Location in Uruguay
- Coordinates: 32°30′54″S 54°41′19″W
- Country: Uruguay
- Department: Cerro Largo Department
- Municipality: Municipality of Tres Islas

Population (2011)
  - Total: 195
- Time zone: UTC -3
- Postal code: +598 4460

Tres Islas is a locality in Cerro Largo Department in Uruguay. It is the head of the Municipality of Tres Islas.

== Geography ==
Tres Islas is located in the western part of the department of Cerro Largo, on the hill of the same name, north of the Quebracho Stream, and next to a secondary road that joins it with Route 7. It is 22 km (14 mi) from the city of Fraile Muerto and 62 km (39 mi) from the departmental capital Melo.

== Population ==
In 2011, Tres Islas had a population of 195.

Year	Population
1963	216
1975	190
1985	182
1996	132
2004	211
2011	195

Source: Instituto Nacional de Estadística de Uruguay
