= Canelón Chico River =

River in Uruguay

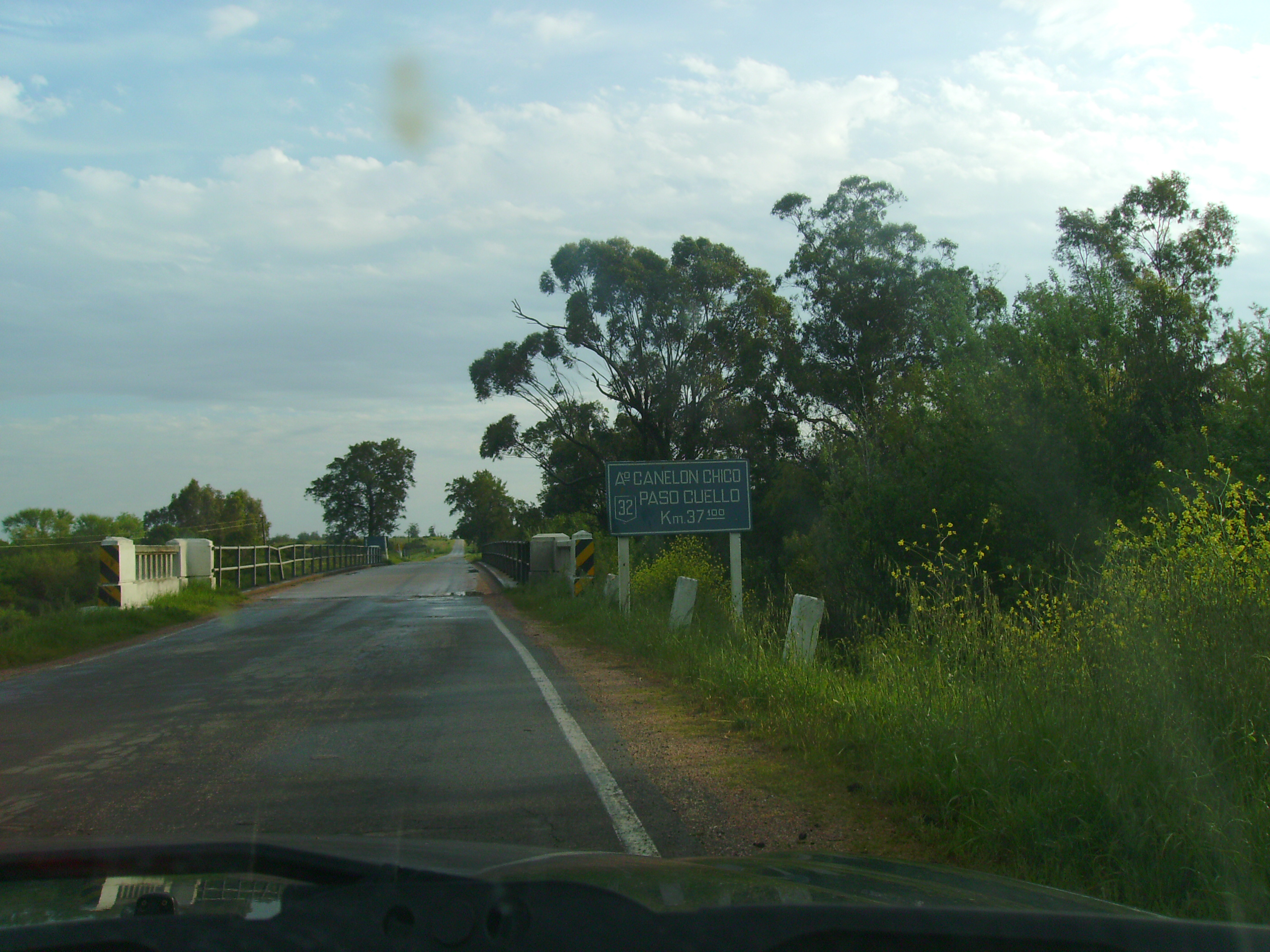

- Native name: Arroyo Canelón Chico (Spanish)

Location
- Department: Canelones
- City: Canelón Chico
- Country: Uruguay

Physical characteristics
- Source
  - location: Cuchilla de Pereira
  - coordinates: 34.5915°S 56.1604°W
  - elevation: 27 metres (89 ft)
- Mouth: Arroyo Canelón Grande
  - location: Canelones, Uruguay
  - coordinates: 34.5088°S 56.3910°W
  - elevation: .3 metres (1 ft 0 in)
- Length: 25 kilometres (16 mi)

The Canelón Chico River (Spanish: Arroyo Canelón Chico) is a river in the department of Canelones, Uruguay. The local jurisdiction Canelón Chico is named after the river.

== Ecosystem ==
The river starts at Cuchilla de Pereira, and runs for 25 kilometres before it deposits its water into the Arroyo Canelón Grande. The river passes through a number of areas used for agriculture, including small farms and vineyards.

Native forest exists along the coast of the river, including Scutia buxifolia, the native willow Salix humboldtiana and Allophylus edulis. Important Fauna include Galictis cuja, Monodelphis dimidiata and Conepatus chinga. Important birds include Turdus rufiventris and Hydropsalis torquata.

== Contamination ==
In 2001, an environmental study of the river found that it had 9300 micrograms of phosphorus per liter of water, resulting in nutrient pollution.

A plan to work on this contamination and create a plan for conservation started in 2020 for the waterway. In 2022 an interpretive walking part along the river was created in the City of Canelons, call "Sendero Interpretativo del Parque Artigas", to sensitize the local population to the importance of environmental conservation of the local ecosystem and the impact of industry and agriculture on the waterway during the 20th century.

== See also ==
- Aguas Corrientes
