= Ramón Trigo =

- Village
- Location in Uruguay
- Coordinates: 32°20′58″S 54°38′15″W
- Country: Uruguay
- Department: Cerro Largo Department

Population (2011)
  - Total: 150
- Time zone: UTC -3
- Postal code: 37003
- Dial plan: +598 4679 (+4 digits)

Ramón Trigo is a small village in the Cerro Largo Department of eastern Uruguay.

== Geography ==
It is located 1.4 kilometres (0.87 mi) into a road that splits off Ruta 26 (on its kilometre 388) in a southern direction, about 46 kilometres (29 mi) west of the department capital city of Melo. It lies north of Fraile Muerto and Tres Islas.

== Population ==
In 2011 Ramón Trigo had a population of 150.

Year	Population
1963	113
1975	42
1985	42
1996	151
2004	171
2011	150

Source: Instituto Nacional de Estadística de Uruguay
