= Quebracho, Cerro Largo =

Quebracho
- Hamlet
- Location in Uruguay
- Coordinates: 32°37′24″S 54°45′11″W
- Country: Uruguay
- Department: Cerro Largo Department
- Municipality: Municipality of Quebracho

Population (2011)
  - Total: 70
- Time zone: UTC -3

Quebracho is a hamlet in Cerro Largo Department in Uruguay. It is the head of the Municipality of Quebracho.

== Location ==
Quebracho is located in the center-west part of the department of Cerro Largo, on the Tupambaé blade, near the shores of the Coimbra Stream. It is accessed by local road from the town of Cerro de las Cuentas, which is 19 km (12 mi) away.

== Population ==
In 2011, Quebracho had a population of 70.

Year	Population
2011	70

Source: Instituto Nacional de Estadística de Uruguay
