= San José de Mayo =

City in San José Department, Uruguay

- Capital city
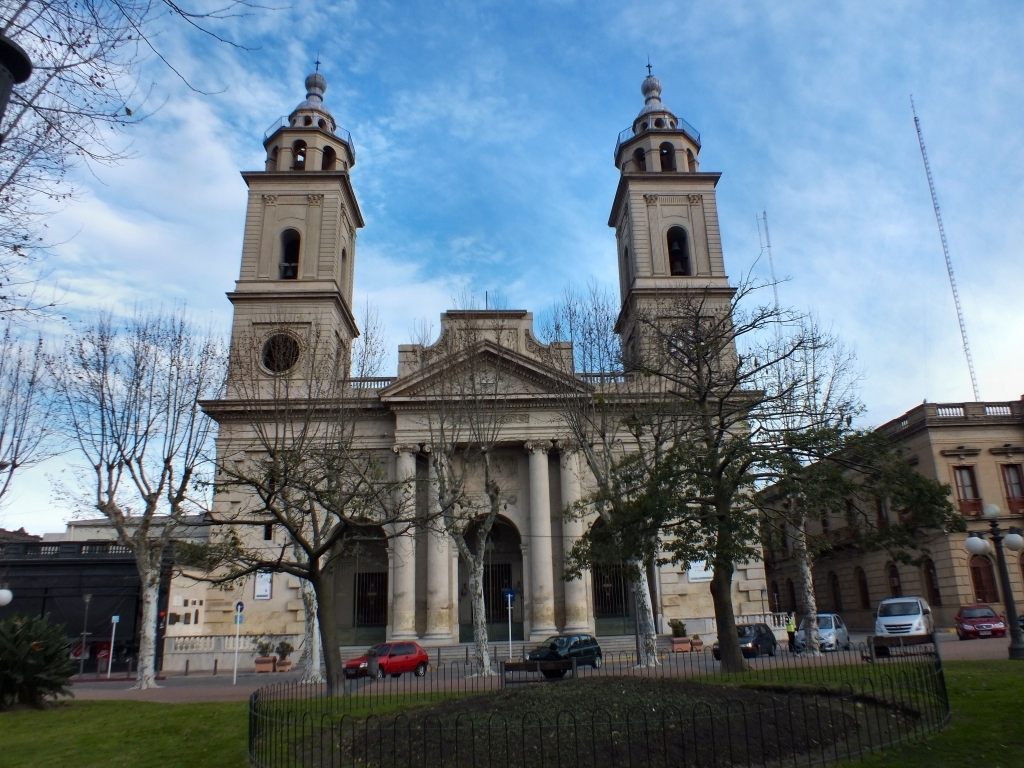
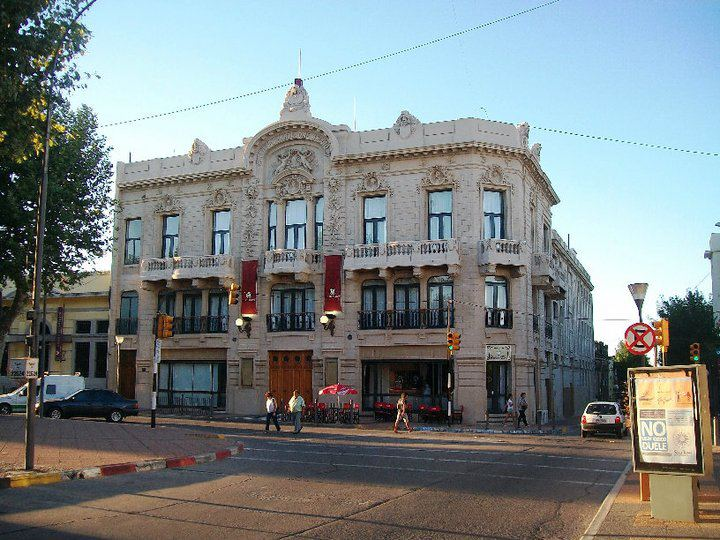
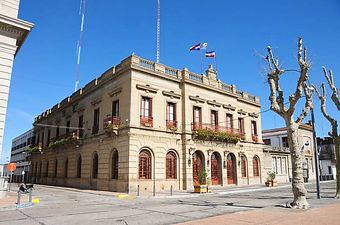
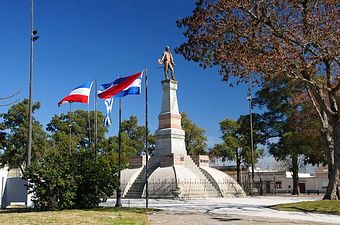
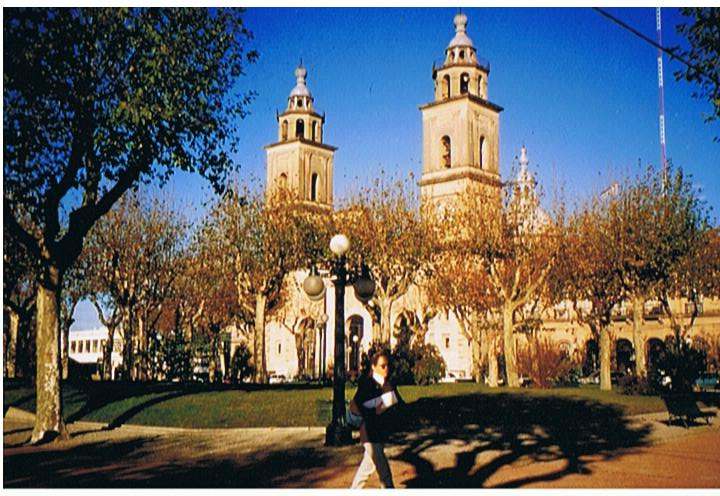
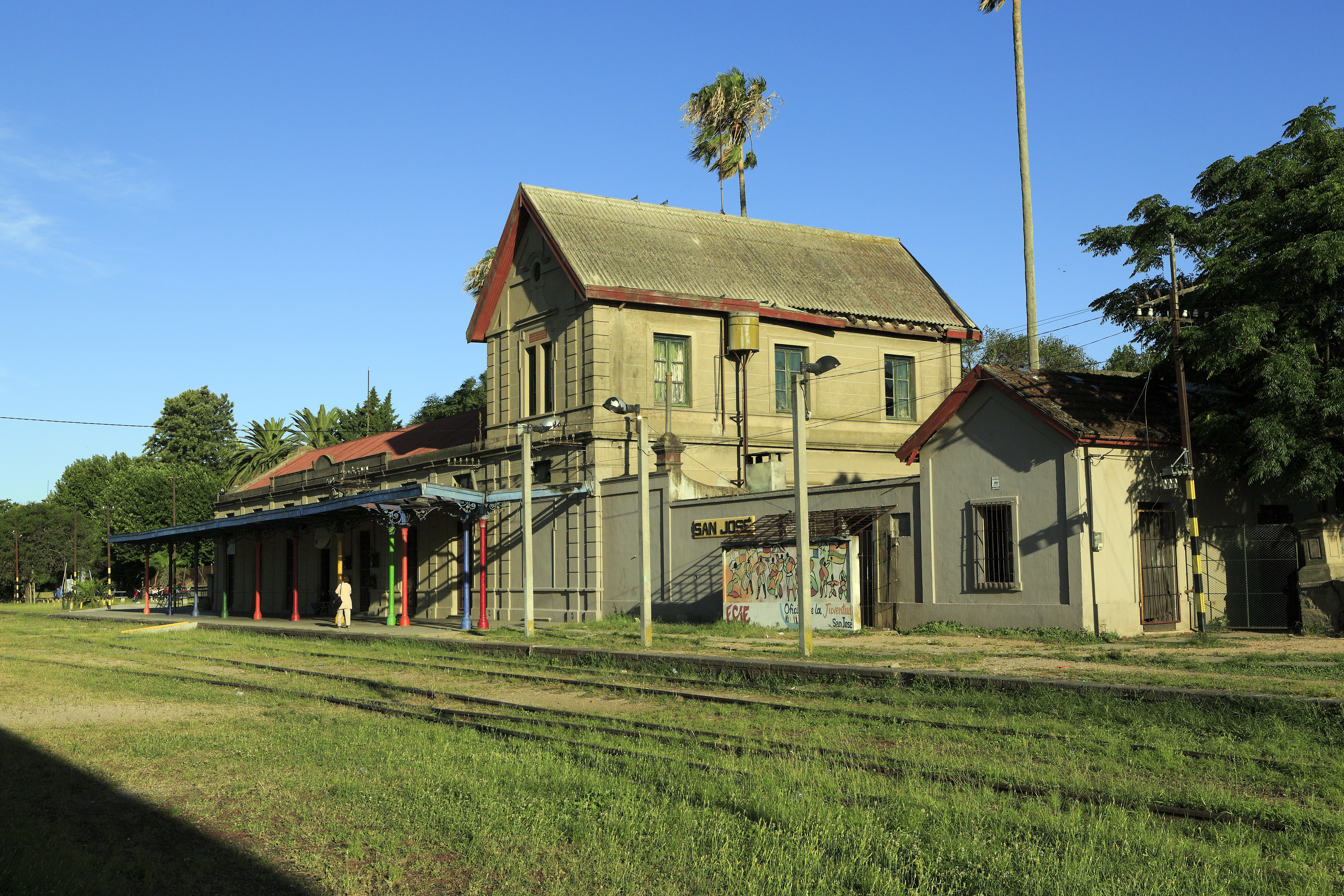
- From top, left to right: view of the Cathedral, the Macció Theater, the City Hall, monument of José Artigas in the Independence Square, the Treinta y Tres Orientales Square and the station.

- Location in Uruguay
- Coordinates: 34°20′0″S 56°43′0″W
- Country: Uruguay
- Department: San José Department
- Founded: 1783

Area
  - Total: 16.9 km^{2} (6.5 sq mi)
- Elevation: 51 m (167 ft)

Population (2023 Census)
  - Total: 35,883
  - Density: 2,120/km^{2} (5,500/sq mi)
  - Demonym: maragato-a
- Time zone: UTC -3
- Postal code: 80000
- Dial plan: +598 434 (+5 digits)
- Climate: Cfa

San José de Mayo (Spanish pronunciation: [saŋ xoˈse ðe ˈmaʝo]; Mayo locally [ˈmaʒo, ˈmaʃo]) is a city in the San José Department in southern Uruguay. Located on the banks of the San José River, it lies approximately 90 km (56 mi) northwest of Montevideo. It was founded in 1783 by Spanish colonialists, and later developed into an administrative and agricultural center in the region. Spread over an area of 16.95 km^{2} (6.54 sq mi), it had a population of 38,553 inhabitants in 2023.

== History ==
San José de Mayo was founded on 1 June 1783 by Eusebio Vidal under orders from Viceroy Juan José de Vértiz y Salcedo. It is named after the San José River. The first settlers consisted of about 40 Spanish families, originating from mainland Spain, accompanied by several indigenous people and supplies. The inhabitants of the city became known as "maragatos" after the Maragatería region in Province of León. These settlers had colonized Patagonia before moving on to southern Uruguay, and later expanded into southern Brazil.

In the early 19th century, San José was a major center in the fight for independence against the Spanish. In 1811, people from San José participated in the revolt led by José Gervasio Artigas. The town served as the provisional capital in the fight against the Empire of Brazil in 1825. The Thirty-Three Orientals passed through San José during the campaign against the Portuguese forces. The Cathedral of San José de Mayo was built between 1857 and 1874.

== Geography ==
San José de Mayo is located on the banks of San Jose river, in the San José Department in southern Uruguay. It is spread over an area of 16.95 km^{2} (6.54 sq mi). Increased precipitation as a result of climate change and impermeabilization of the local land surfaces has made San José de Mayo more prone to flooding over the 1987–2017 period.

== Demographics and economy ==
In 2023, San José de Mayo had a population of 38,553 inhabitants. The population consisted of 18,436 males and 20,117 females. About 6,665 inhabitants (17.3%) were below the age of fourteen.

Year	Population
1867	3,224
1908	12,297
1963	27,482
1975	28,554
1985	31,825
1996	34,552
2004	36,129
2011	36,743
2023	38,553

Source: Instituto Nacional de Estadística de Uruguay

The city serves as a major agricultural and industrial centre in Southern Uruguay. Industries in San José include agricultural products, textiles and leather goods, furniture, and automobile parts
