= Olimar Grande River =

Coordinates: 33°16′49″S 53°52′04″W

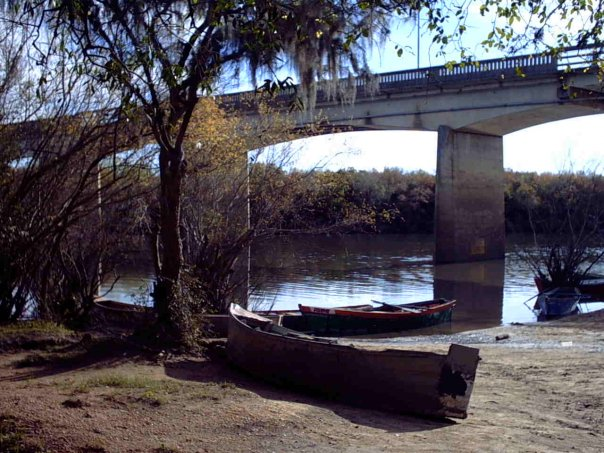

Location
- Country: Uruguay

The Río Olimar River is a river in the Treinta y Tres Department of Uruguay.

== Course ==
The river rises as a small stream in the hills of Cuchilla Grande in western Treinta y Tres Department, just southwest of Santa Clara de Olimar. Heading southeasterly, it collects the smaller streams, the most important of which are the Brazo de la Yeguada, Olimar Chico River (Small Olimar), and Arroyo Yerbal Grande. Other creeks flowing into the Olimar Grande are the Lagarto, Avestruz and Corrales. Covering some 140 kilometres (87 mi), the Olimar discharges into the Cebollatí River as the main tributary, draining some 5,320 square kilometres (2,050 sq mi) of Uruuguay.

The city of Treinta y Tres, capital of the department, appears almost surrounded by the Olimar River and its affluent, the Great Yerbal stream. The two margins of the river are covered with thick native mount. At the southwest limits of the city, three bridges cross the river. The oldest one is a wood and metal bridge now suited only for pedestrians, horses and bicycles. 120 metres (390 ft) upstream, is the bridge of the railroad and another 270 metres (890 ft) upstream is the last one, a modern reinforced concrete bridge carrying the Ruta 8 to the city. These small distances separating the three bridges create a beautiful view often depicted in photos of the Treinta y Tres.

== Folklore and art ==
Besides these geographic characteristics, the Olimar river has an important historical and artistic meaning for the region and the country. An Uruguayan quote about it is "the river that sings more", because its surroundings have been inspiration of various local artists, mainly musicians and poets. Annually a folk music and dance festival takes place on its banks by the city of Treinta y Tres, which gathers participation and audience from all over Uruguay as well as from abroad.

== See also ==
- List of rivers of Uruguay
