= Municipality of Sarandí del Yí =

Municipality of Sarandí del Yí Municipio de Sarandí del Yí
- Municipality
- Municipality of Sarandí del Yí
- Location of the municipality of Sarandí del Yí within the department of Durazno and Uruguay.
- Coordinates: 33°20′38.96″S 55°37′52.69″W
- Country: Uruguay
- Department: Durazno
- Founded: 15 March 2010
- Seat: Sarandí del Yí

Government
  - Mayor: Mario Pereira (PN)

Area
  - Total: 656.2 km^{2} (253.4 sq mi)

Population (2011)
  - Total: 7,389
  - Density: 11.26/km^{2} (29.16/sq mi)
- Time zone: UTC-3
- Constituencies: RDC, RDD and RDE

The municipality of Sarandí del Yí is one of the municipalities of Durazno Department, Uruguay. Its seat is the city of Sarandí del Yí.

== Location ==
The municipality is located in the southwest area of the Durazno Department.

== History ==
The municipality of Guichón was created by Law N° 18.653 of 15 March 2010, in compliance with what was provided by Law N° 18567 of decentralization and citizen participation. This law mandated the creation of municipalities in every settlement with a population above 2000 inhabitants. The constituencies RDC, RDD and RDE of Durazno Department were assigned to this municipality.

== Settlements ==
The only populated place of this municipality is the city of Sarandí del Yí.

== Authorities ==
The authority of the municipality is the Municipal Council, integrated by the Mayor (who presides it) and four Councilors.

Mayors by period
N°	Mayor	Party	Start	End	Notes
1	Mario César Pereyra Pérez	National Party	9 July 2010	8 July 2015	Elected Mayor
2	Mario César Pereyra Pérez	National Party	9 July 2015	2020	Reelected Mayor
