= Plácido Rosas =

- Village
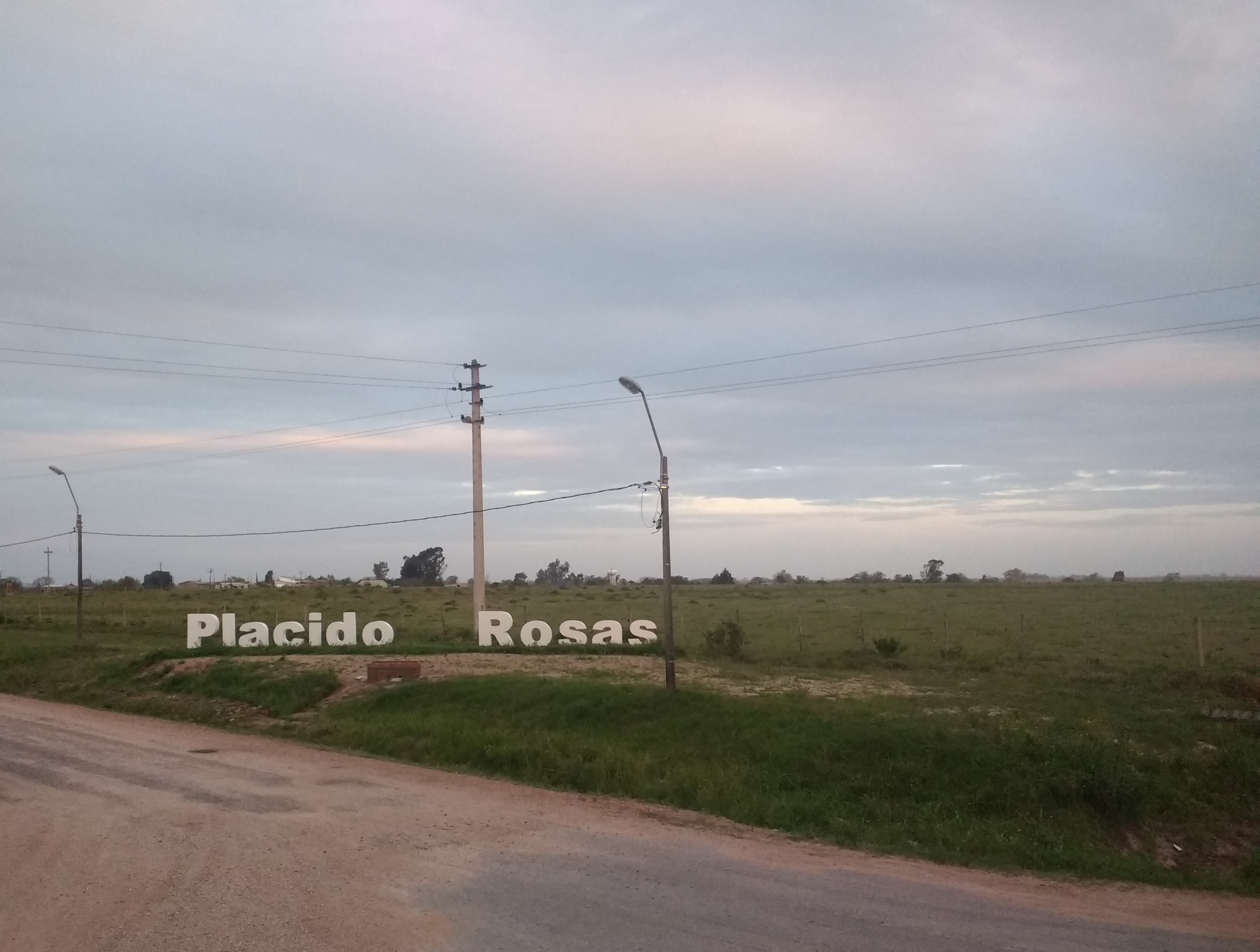

- Location in Uruguay
- Coordinates: 32°45′0″S 53°43′0″W
- Country: Uruguay
- Department: Cerro Largo Department

Population (2011)
  - Total: 415
- Time zone: UTC -3
- Postal code: 37101
- Dial plan: +598 4675 (+4 digits)

Plácido Rosas is a village or populated centre in the Cerro Largo Department of eastern Uruguay.

== Geography ==
It is located on the north bank of Río Tacuarí, near the bridge Paso del Dragóneast, over which Route 18 crosses the river. The railroad track Montevideo - Nico Pérez - Río Branco passes through the village.

== Population ==
In 2011 Plácido Rosas had a population of 415.

Year	Population
1963	379
1975	428
1985	387
1996	402
2004	459
2011	415

Source: Instituto Nacional de Estadística de Uruguay
