= Municipality of San Gregorio de Polanco =

Tacuarembó Department municipality, Uruguay

Municipality of San Gregorio de Polanco Municipio de San Gregorio de Polanco
- Municipality
- Municipality of San Gregorio de Polanco
- Location of the municipality of San Gregorio de Polanco within the department of Tacuarembó and Uruguay.
- Coordinates: 32.49218°S 55.86906°W
- Country: Uruguay
- Department: Tacuarembó
- Founded: 15 March 2010
- Seat: San Gregorio de Polanco

Government
  - Mayor: Asdrubal Rodríguez Acuña (PN)

Area
  - Total: 444.7 km^{2} (171.7 sq mi)

Population (2011)
  - Total: 3,722
  - Density: 8.370/km^{2} (21.68/sq mi)
- Time zone: UTC-3
- Constituencies: TED
- Website: www.municipiosangregorio.gub.uy

The municipality of San Gregorio de Polanco is one of the municipalities of Tacuarembó Department, Uruguay, established on 15 March 2010. Seated in the town of the same name, the municipality is situated north of the Negro River and west of the Tacuarembó River. It is known as "Ciudad Museo", due to its extensive open-air visual arts.

== History ==
The municipality of San Gregorio de Polanco was created by Law No. 18,653 of 15 March 2010, as part of Tacuarembó Department, that intended to cover the electoral constituency identified by series TED, the same territory as the Ninth Judicial Section of Tacuarembó. This new entity created under the new system of second level administrative divisions of Uruguay, replaced the former Non-Autonomous Local Board of San Gregorio de Polanco, which the former system was criticized due to their lack of self-governance and submission to departmental authorities.

== Geography ==
The municipality, part of Tacuarembó Department, is located at its south side, north of the Negro River and west of the Tacuarembó River. The municipality has a total area of 444.7 km^{2}, and it has 3722 inhabitants according to the 2011 national census, with a population density of 8.4 inhabitants per square kilometer.

== Symbols ==
The municipality of San Gregorio de Polanco does not possess a traditional coat of arms, utilizing a stylized logo for official identification instead. The logo consists of three disconnected, pointed rectangles in yellow, blue, and green, each bearing one of the letters "SGP." This design is intended to reflect the artistic identity of the town.

The municipal flag consists of a white field with the logo centered. As of 2015, the version displayed at the municipal building included the text "MUNICIPIO SAN GREGORIO DE POLANCO" above the logo and the motto "Ciudad Museo" centered below.

== Settlements ==
The following settlements are part of this municipality:

- San Gregorio de Polanco (seat)
- Paso Hondo
- Los Furtados
- Rolón
- Cañadas del Estado
- Rincón de Alonso
- Paso Real

== Authorities ==
The authority of the municipality is the Municipal Council, integrated by the Mayor (presiding over it) and four Councilors, all of whom are elected by direct popular vote every five years. According to the law, the Council is responsible for proposing local budgetary programs, managing public services, and ensuring the preservation of local historical sites. Additionally, the Council is required to hold annual public hearings to promote transparency and citizen participation in local governance.

Mayors by period
#	Major	Party	Start	End	Notes
1	Mario Sergio Texeira Cardozo	National Party	9 July 2010	8 July 2015	Elected Mayor. Councilors: Ricardo López (PN), Zully Fredi Day (PN), Gustavo Martínez (PN), Tomas Larregui (PN).
2	Mario Sergio Texeira Cardozo	National Party	9 July 2015	7 August 2019	Re-elected Mayor. He died in Spain in 2019. Councilors: Ricardo López (PN), María V. Rodríguez (PN), Sergio Martínez (PN), Diego Posada (PN).
3	Alina María Lorenzo Larregui	National Party	28 August 2019	26 November 2020	Substitute Mayor designated due to the death of Mayor Texeira.
4	Asdrubal Rodríguez Acuña	National Party	27 November 2020	10 February 2025	Elected Mayor. Councilors: Juan Rivero (PN), Alejandro Castro (PN), Sergio Martínez (PN), Martín Medeiro (PN).
5	Lourdes Lacuesta		10 February 2025	10 July 2025	Elected interim Mayor
6	Asdrubal Rodríguez Acuña	National Party	11 July 2025	2030 (scheduled)	Elected Mayor.
