= Municipality of Quebracho, Paysandú =

Municipality of Quebracho Municipio de Quebracho
- Municipality
- Municipality of Quebracho
- Location of the municipality of Quebracho within the department of Paysandú and Uruguay.
- Coordinates: 31.9°S 57.9°W
- Country: Uruguay
- Department: Paysandú
- Founded: 15 March 2010
- Seat: Quebracho

Government
  - Mayor: Mario Isidoro Bandera (PN)

Area
  - Total: 1,088.4 km^{2} (420.2 sq mi)

Population (2011)
  - Total: 3,671
  - Density: 3.373/km^{2} (8.736/sq mi)
- Time zone: UTC-3
- Constituencies: KFA and KFC

The municipality of Quebracho is one of the municipalities of Paysandú Department. Its seat is the city of Quebracho.

== Location ==
The municipality is located in the west section of Paysandú Department, south to the municipality of Chapicuy and north to the municipality of Lorenzo Geyres. To its west it is the Entre Ríos Province, Argentina.

== History ==
The Municipality was created by Law N° 18653 of 15 March 2020, in compliance with the provisions of the Law N° 18567 that provided for the creation of municipalities over all settlements with 2000 or more inhabitants. It is part of the Paysandú Department and comprises the KFA and KFC electoral districts or constituencies of the department. Its limits were determined by Departmental Decree of the Departmental Board of Paysandú N° 6064/2010.

== Settlements ==
The following settlements are part of this municipality:

- Quebracho (seat)
- Colonia Arroyo Malo

== Authorities ==
The authority of the municipality is the Municipal Council, integrated by the Mayor (who presides it) and four Councilors.

Mayors by period
N°	Mayor	Party	Start	End	Notes
1	Mario Isidoro Bandera	National Party	9 July 2010	8 July 2015	Elected Mayor. Councilors: Franco Pastorini (PN), Ariel Bondarenco (PN), Ivana Saracchi (PN), Diego Henderson (FA)
2	Mario Isidoro Bandera	National Party	9 July 2015	2020	Elected Mayor for 2nd term
