= Santa Lucía Chico =

Coordinates: 34.3521°S 56.3392°W

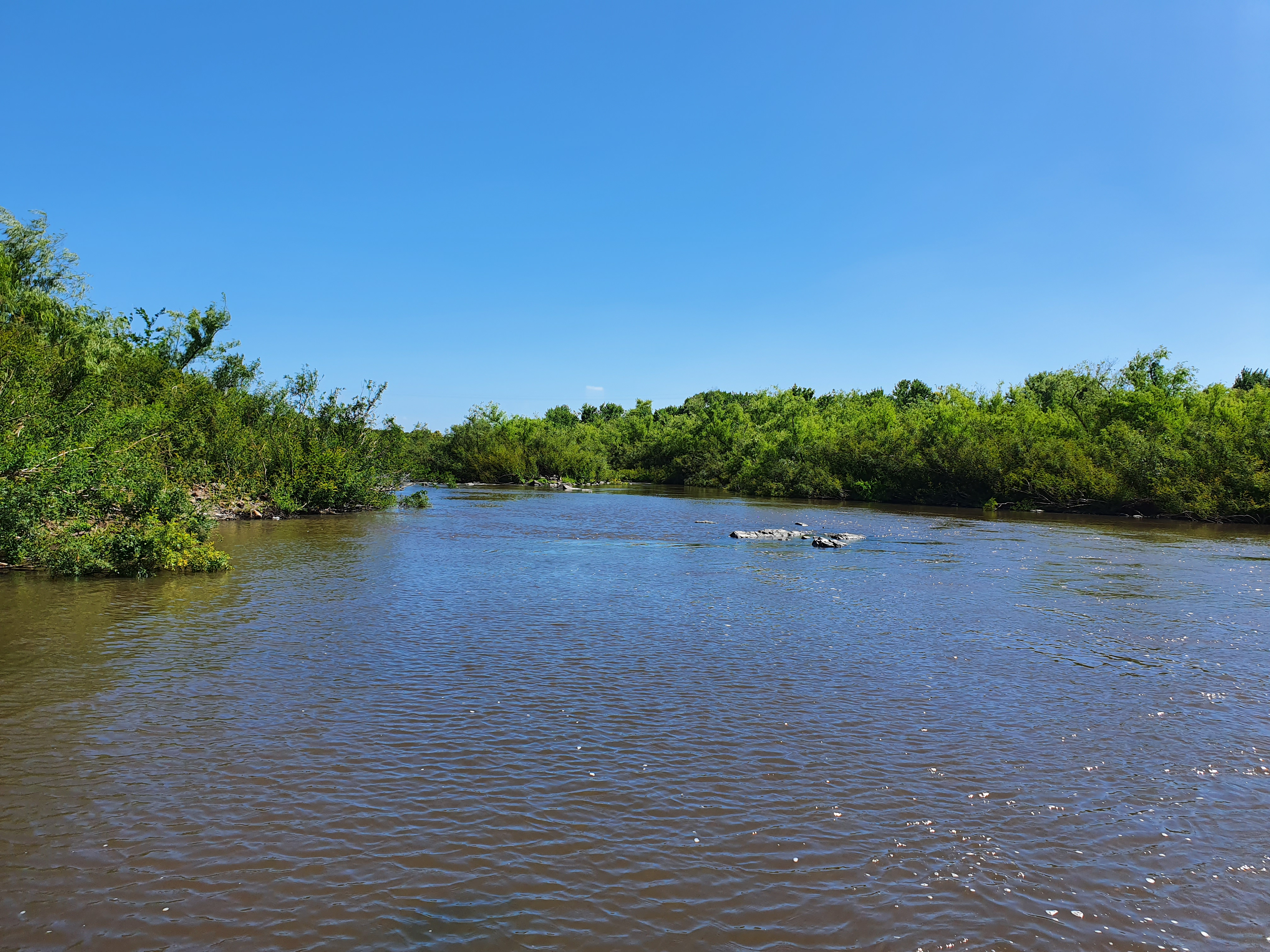

Location
- Country: Uruguay

The Santa Lucía Chico is a river of Uruguay.

== See also ==
- List of rivers of Uruguay
