= Municipality of Ombúes de Lavalle =

Municipality of Ombúes de Lavalle Municipio de Ombúes de Lavalle
- Municipality
- Municipality of Ombúes de Lavalle
- Location of the municipality of Ombúes de Lavalle within the department of Colonia and Uruguay.
- Coordinates: 33.9375°S 57.8125°W
- Country: Uruguay
- Department: Colonia
- Founded: 22 March 2013
- Seat: Ombúes de Lavalle

Government
  - Mayor: Marcelo Castro (PN)

Area
  - Total: 398 km^{2} (154 sq mi)

Population (2011)
  - Total: 3,936
  - Density: 9.89/km^{2} (25.6/sq mi)
- Time zone: UTC-3
- Constituencies: NGA and NGB

The municipality of Ombúes de Lavalle is one of the municipalities in the Colonia Department, Uruguay. Its seat is the city of Ombúes de Lavalle.

== Location ==
The municipality lies in the north section of the department, and limits to its southeast with the Colonia Miguelete Municipality and to its north with Soriano Department.

== History ==
The municipality of Ombúes de Lavalle was created by Departmental Law N° 014/2013 of 22 March 2013 of the Departmental Board of Colonia, before the proposal of the Intendant of Colonia, following the provisions of the Law N° 18567 and its later reforming Laws.

== Territory ==
According to the Departmental Law N° 014/2013 the limits of the municipality's territory match those of the NGA and NGB constituencies of Colonia Department.

== Authorities ==
The authority of the municipality is the Municipal Council, integrated by the Mayor (who presides it) and four Councilors.

Mayors by period
N°	Mayor	Party	Start	End	Notes
1	Marcelo Castro	National Party	9 July 2015	2020	Elected Major.
