= Pantanoso Creek =

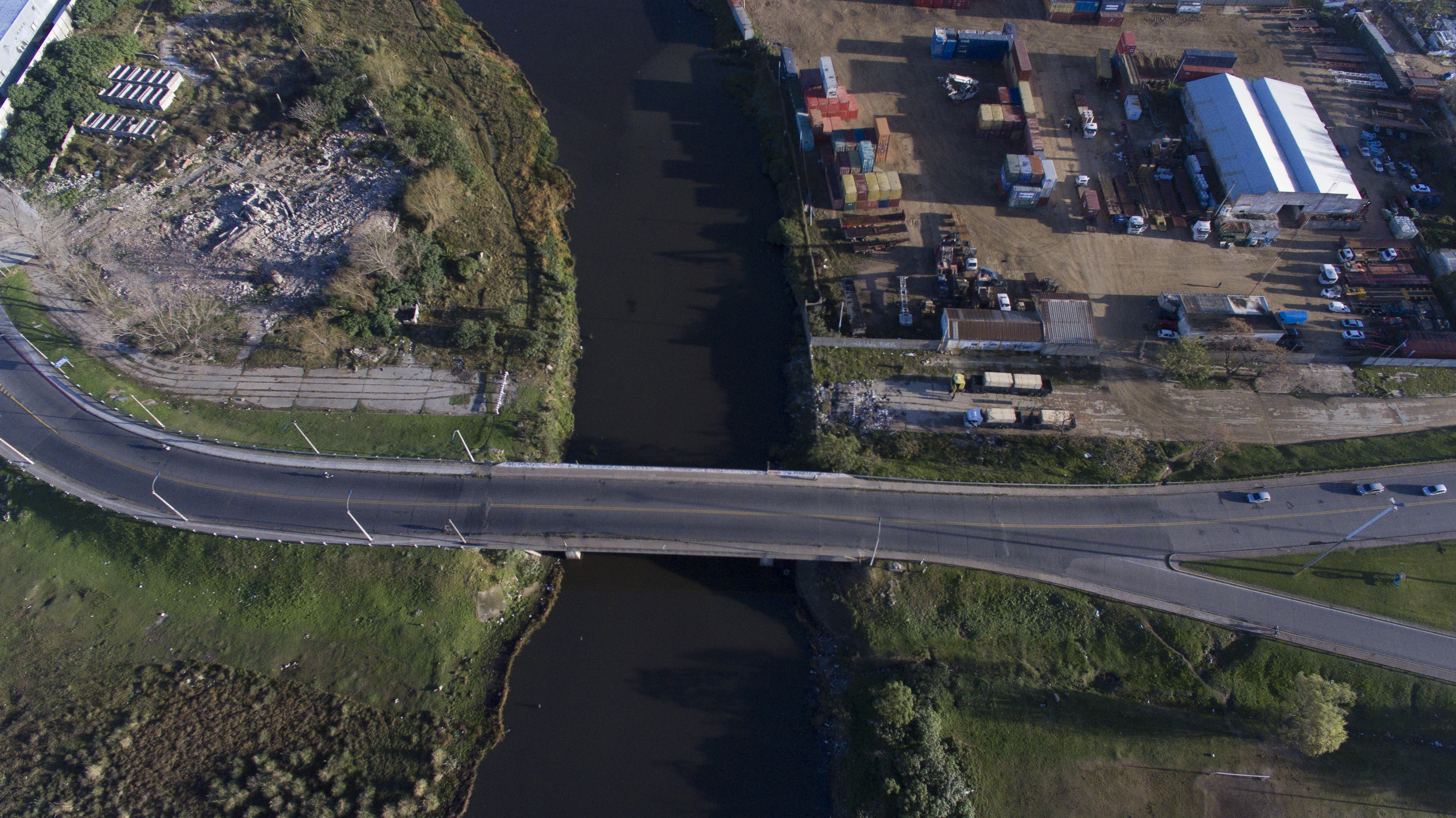

Location
- Country: Uruguay

Physical characteristics
- Mouth
  - location: Río de la Plata
- Length: 14 km (8.7 mi)

Pantanoso Creek (Spanish: Arroyo Pantanoso, meaning "swampy creek") is a Uruguayan stream, crossing Montevideo Department. It flows into the Bay of Montevideo and then into the Río de la Plata.

It is one of the most contaminated water streams in the country.

== See also ==
- List of rivers of Uruguay
