= Municipality of Baltasar Brum =

Municipality of Baltasar Brum Municipio de Baltasar Brum
- Municipality
- Municipality of Baltasar Brum
- Location of the municipality of Baltasar Brum within the department of Artigas and Uruguay.
- Country: Uruguay
- Department: Artigas
- Founded: 15 March 2010
- Seat: Baltasar Brum

Government
  - Mayor: Juan Carlos Martinicorena (PN)

Area
  - Total: 754 km^{2} (291 sq mi)

Population (2011)
  - Total: 2,608
  - Density: 3.46/km^{2} (8.96/sq mi)
- Time zone: UTC-3
- Constituencies: ICA

The municipality of Baltasar Brum is one of the three municipalities of Artigas Department. Its seat is the city of Baltasar Brum.

== Location ==
The municipality is located in the southwest area of the Artigas Department.

== History ==
The municipality of Baltasar Brum was created by Law N° 18653 of 15 March 2010, in compliance with the provisions of the Law N° 18567, that provided for the establishment of municipalities in all of the settlements with 2000 or more inhabitants. It is part of the Artigas Department and comprises the ICA constituency of that department.

== Settlements ==
The only populated place part of this municipality is Baltasar Brum.

== Authorities ==
The authority of the municipality is the Municipal Council, integrated by the Mayor (who presides it) and four Councilors.

Mayors by period
N°	Mayor	Party	Start	End	Notes
1	José Lachaise	National Party	9 July 2010	8 July 2015	Elected Mayor; Councilors: José Besil Nario (PN), Jorge Velázquez (FA), Elio Silveira (FA), Wilson Medina (PC)
2	Juan Carlos Martinicorena	National Party	9 July 2015	2020	Elected Mayor
