= Cebollatí River =

Coordinates: 33°09′21″S 53°38′18″W

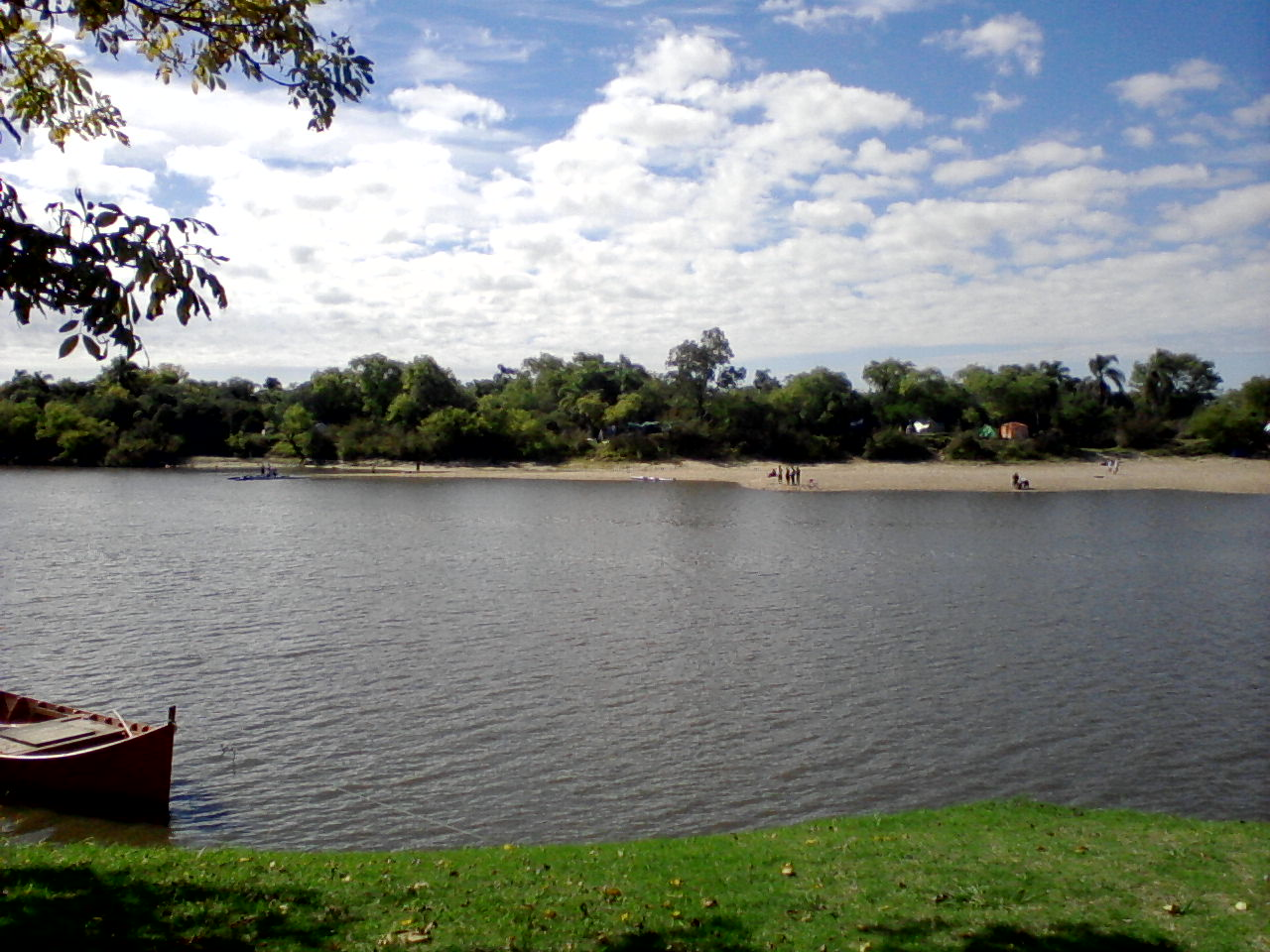

Location
- Country: Uruguay

Physical characteristics
- Length: 235 km (146 mi)

The Cebollatí River is a Uruguayan river that rises in Cuchilla Grande (Big Ridge), flows southwest to northeast and forms a border between Treinta y Tres and Rocha.

== Features and location ==
At roughly 235 kilometres (146 mi), it is one of the longest rivers in Uruguay.

It forms in Cuchilla Grande, then joins the Rio Olimar Grande and flows into the Merin Lagoon in Treinta y Tres.

In October 2009 the National Hydrographic Institute of Uruguay started operating a free raft service across the Cebollatí River; this service allows commuters to cross from Treinta y Tres to Rocha in a wooden raft between the localities of Cebollatí and Charqueada.

The Isla del Padre is worth visiting and exploring, due to its rich biodiversity.

== See also ==
- List of rivers of Uruguay
- Lagoon Mirim § Location
- Olimar Grande River
