= Municipality of Tomás Gomensoro =

Municipality of Tomás Gomensoro Municipio de Tomás Gomensoro
- Municipality
- Municipality of Tomás Gomensoro
- Location of the municipality of Tomás Gomensoro within the department of Artigas and Uruguay.
- Coordinates: 30.4°S 57.4°W
- Country: Uruguay
- Department: Artigas
- Founded: 15 March 2010
- Seat: Tomás Gomensoro

Government
  - Mayor: Luis Eduardo Gutiérrez (PN)

Area
  - Total: 804.5 km^{2} (310.6 sq mi)

Population (2011)
  - Total: 2,902
  - Density: 3.607/km^{2} (9.343/sq mi)
- Time zone: UTC-3
- Constituencies: ICC

The municipality of Tomás Gomensoro is one of the three municipalities of Artigas Department. Its seat is the locality of Tomás Gomensoro.

== Location ==
The municipality is located in the northeast section of Artigas Department, east to the municipality of Bella Unión and north to the municipality of Baltasar Brum.

== History ==
The Municipality was created by Law N° 18653 of 15 March 2020, in compliance with the provisions of the Law N° 18567 that provided for the creation of municipalities over all settlements with 2000 or more inhabitants. It is part of the Artigas Department and comprises the ICC electoral district or constituency of the department.

== Settlements ==
The only settlement of the municipality is the locality of Tomás Gomensoro.

== Authorities ==
The authority of the municipality is the Municipal Council, integrated by the Mayor (who presides it) and four Councilors.

Mayors by period
N°	Mayor	Party	Start	End	Notes
1	María Alejandra Paz	National Party	9 July 2010	8 July 2015	Elected Mayor. Councilors: Julio Rodríguez (PN), Julio Sant'Anna (PN), Jorge Bustos (PC), Nelly E. Farías (FA).
2	Luis Eduardo Gutiérrez	National Party	9 July 2015	2020	Elected Mayor
