= San Luis River =

Coordinates: 33.5228°S 53.5419°W

Location
- Country: Uruguay

The San Luis River is a river of Uruguay.

== See also ==
- List of rivers of Uruguay
