= Arroyo de la India Muerta =

Coordinates: 33°40′S 54°04′W

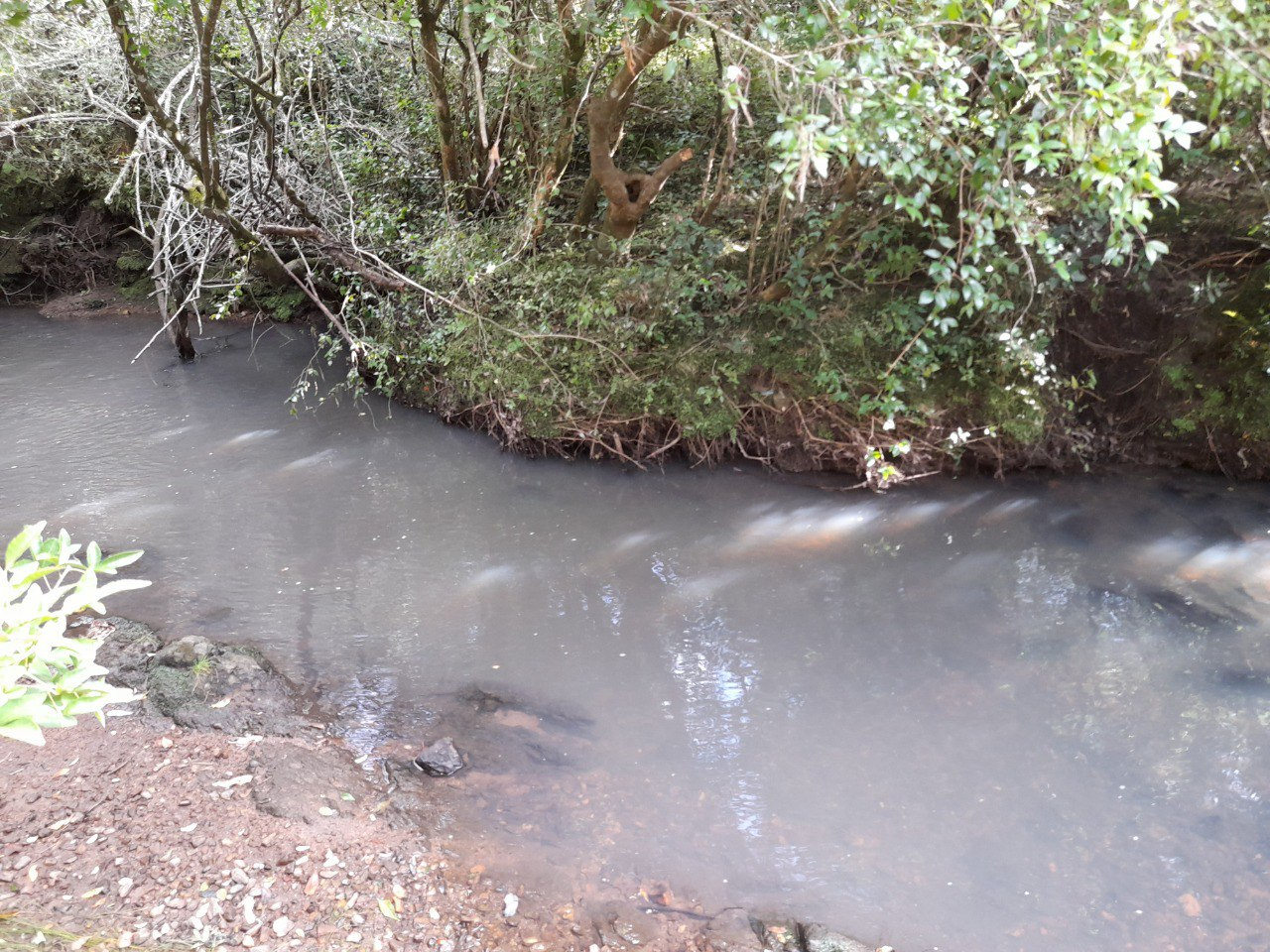

Location
- Country: Uruguay

The Arroyo de la India Muerta is a river of Uruguay.

== See also ==
- List of rivers of Uruguay
