= Municipality A (Montevideo) =

- Municipality
- Municipio A
- Location of Municipality A in the Montevideo Department.
- Coordinates: 34°51′59″N 56°14′10″W
- Country: Uruguay
- department: Montevideo

Population
  - Total: 207,911
  - Density: 1/km^{2} (2.6/sq mi)
- Time zone: UTC-3

Municipality A is one of the eight municipalities into which the department of Montevideo, in Uruguay, is administratively divided. It is headquartered on Avenida Carlos María Ramírez corner Rivera Indarte in the city of Montevideo.

It was created through decree 11,567 of September 13, 2009, later ratified.

== Administration ==
Alcalde of Municipios A in 2014 is Gabriel Otero.

== See also ==
- Municipalities of Uruguay
