= Queguay Chico River =

Coordinates: 32.1533°S 57.4692°W

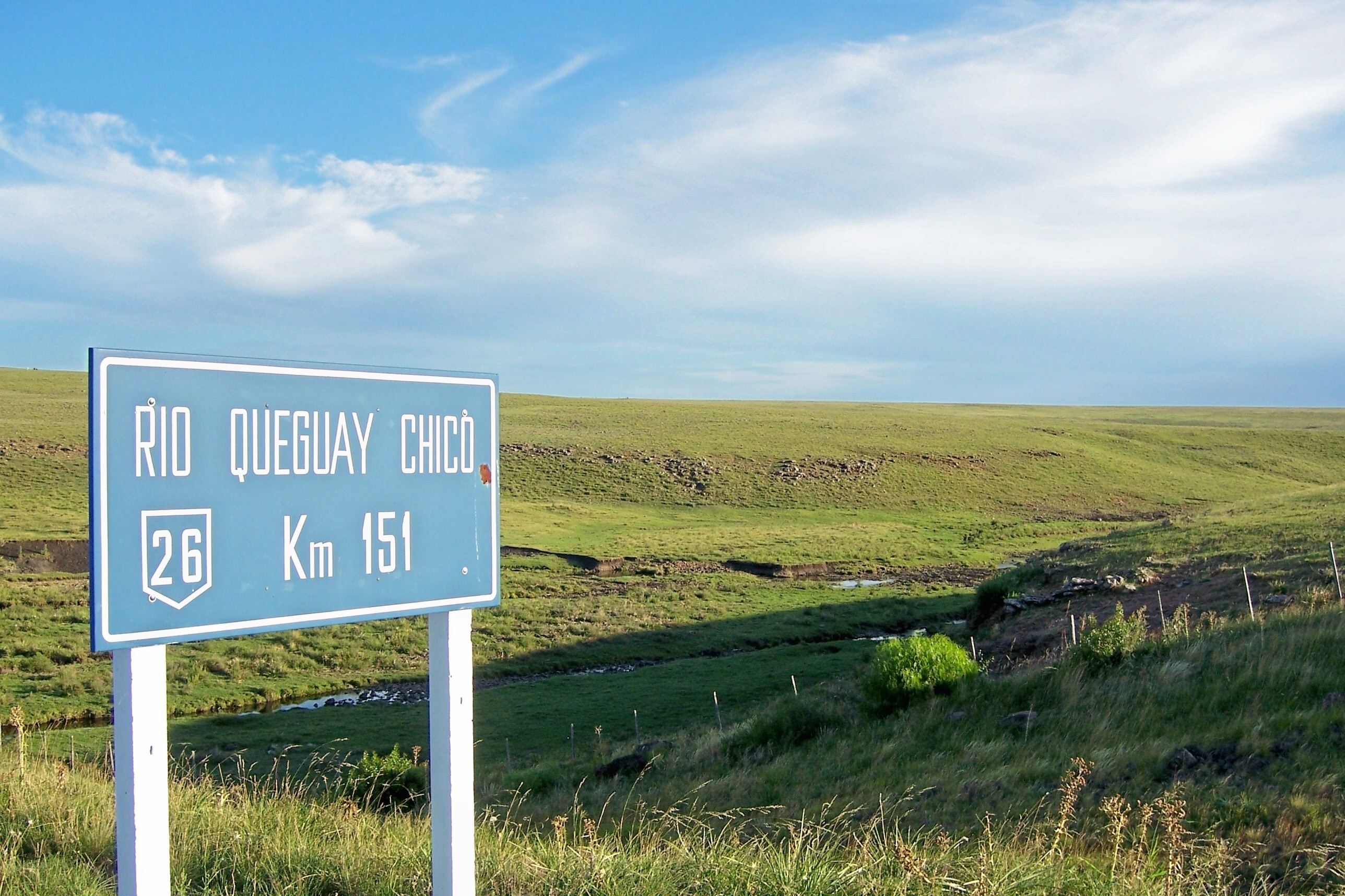

Location
- Country: Uruguay

The Queguay Chico River is a river of Uruguay.

== See also ==
- List of rivers of Uruguay
