= 2010 Uruguayan municipal elections =

Local election

Final results by department of the Uruguayan municipal elections, 2010. National Party Broad Front Colorado Party

Uruguay's local government elections, held on May 9, 2010, to elect the intendente of the 19 departments that are the administrative divisions of Uruguay, resulted in losses for the Frente Amplio government, and some gains for the opposition Partido Nacional and Partido Colorado. This was the first time that another level of government was elected as well: 89 local governments.

== Background ==
The Frente Amplio (left-wing) had won with a narrow margin the presidential and parliamentary elections on October 25, 2009, having to face a runoff on November 29. This relatively poor showing was reflected in the municipal elections of 2010.

In the municipal elections of May 2005, the Partido Nacional had obtained 10 departments, the Partido Colorado only one department, and the Frente Amplio 8 departments, for the very first time. As a result of the municipal elections of 2010, the Partido Nacional won 12 departments, the Frente Amplio 5, and the Partido Colorado 2. The Partido Nacional had a net gain of two departments, the Partido Colorado had a net gain of one department and the Frente Amplio had a net loss of three departments. Many political pundits commented that this was the heaviest loss of the Frente Amplio in all its electoral history.

== List of winning candidates for intendente ==
Following is a list of the departments in Uruguay, with the name of the intendente elected, his party affiliation and the faction within the party to which he belongs:

- Montevideo: Ana Olivera (Frente Amplio, Communist Party of Uruguay). Hold for the Frente Amplio.
- Artigas: Patricia Ayala (Frente Amplio, Movimiento de Participación Popular). Pickup for the Frente Amplio from the Partido Nacional.
- Canelones: Marcos Carámbula (Frente Amplio, Alianza Progresista). Re-elected incumbent. Hold for the Frente Amplio.
- Cerro Largo: Sergio Botana (Partido Nacional, Alianza Nacional). Hold for the Partido Nacional.
- Colonia: Walter Zimmer (Partido Nacional, Alianza Nacional). Hold for the Partido Nacional.
- Durazno: Benjamín Irazábal (Partido Nacional, Herrerismo). Hold for the Partido Nacional.
- Flores: Armando Castaingdebat (Partido Nacional, Herrerismo). Re-elected incumbent. Hold for the Partido Nacional.
- Florida: Carlos Enciso (Partido Nacional, Correntada Wilsonista). Pickup for the Partido Nacional from the Frente Amplio.
- Lavalleja: Adriana Peña (Partido Nacional, Alianza Nacional). Hold for the Partido Nacional.
- Maldonado: Oscar de los Santos (Frente Amplio, Alianza Progresista). Re-elected incumbent. Hold for the Frente Amplio.
- Paysandú: Bertil Bentos (Partido Nacional, Alianza Nacional). Pickup for the Partido Nacional from the Frente Amplio.
- Río Negro: Omar Lafluf (Partido Nacional, Alianza Nacional). Re-elected incumbent. Hold for the Partido Nacional.
- Rivera: Marne Osorio (Partido Colorado, Foro Batllista). Hold for the Partido Colorado.
- Rocha: Artigas Barrios (Frente Amplio, Socialist Party of Uruguay). Re-elected incumbent. Hold for the Frente Amplio.
- Salto: Germán Coutinho (Partido Colorado, Vamos Uruguay). Pickup for the Partido Colorado from the Frente Amplio.
- San José: José Luis Falero (Partido Nacional, Herrerismo). Hold for the Partido Nacional.
- Soriano: Guillermo Besozzi (Partido Nacional, Alianza Nacional). Re-elected incumbent. Hold for the Partido Nacional.
- Tacuarembó: Wilson Ezquerra (Partido Nacional, Alianza Nacional). Re-elected incumbent. Hold for the Partido Nacional.
- Treinta y Tres: Dardo Sánchez Cal (Partido Nacional, Alianza Nacional). Pickup for the Partido Nacional from the Frente Amplio.
