= Municipality of Maldonado =

Municipality of Maldonado Municipio de Maldonado
- Municipality
- Municipality of Maldonado
- Location of the municipality of Maldonado within the department of Maldonado and Uruguay.
- Country: Uruguay
- Department: Maldonado
- Founded: 15 March 2010
- Seat: Maldonado

Government
  - Mayor: Dina Fernández Chaves (PN)

Area
  - Total: 192 km^{2} (74 sq mi)

Population (2011)
  - Total: 105,000
  - Density: 547/km^{2} (1,420/sq mi)
- Time zone: UTC-3
- Postal code: 20000, 20003, 20005
- Constituencies: DAA, DAC, DAD, DAE, DAF, DAG, DAH, DAI and DAJ.
- Website: http://www.maldonado.gub.uy/?mi=Maldonado

The Municipality of Maldonado is one of the eight municipalities of Maldonado Department, Uruguay. It was created by Law N° 18653 of 15 March 2010.

== Location ==
The municipality is located at the south area of the department, and it has a total area of 192 km² (a 4.01% of the department area) and a population of around 105000 inhabitants (55.12% of the department population).

== Limits ==
According to the Decree of the Departmental Board of Maldonado N° 3862 of 11 February 2010, the territorial jurisdiction of the municipality was established as follows:

Article 8°.- It is created the Municipality of the city of Maldonado (departmental capital) which shall have the following territorial jurisdiction:

To the West: El Potrero creek and shore of the Sauce Lake until the North limit with the jurisdiction of the Municipality of San Carlos.

To the North and East: the beginning of the jurisdiction of the Municipality of San Carlos.

To the Northwest: the beginning of the territorial jurisdiction of the Municipality of Piriápolis.

To the South: Río de la Plata to Rambla Claudio Williman's Stop 16 (where it limits to the East and Southeast with the jurisdiction of the Municipality of Punta del Este).

== Settlements ==
The following populated places are part of this municipality:

- Abra de Perdomo
- Barrio Hipódromo
- Canteras de Marelli
- Cerro Pelado
- Chihuahua
- Laguna del Diario
- Laguna del Sauce
- Las Cumbres
- Los Ceibos
- Los Corchos
- Maldonado
- Pinares-Las Delicias
- Portezuelo
- Punta Ballena

== Constituencies ==
According to the Decree of the Departmental Board of Maldonado N° 3909 of 2 December 2004, the following electoral series and constituencies were ordered:

- DAA: Centro
- DAC: Los Ceibos
- DAD: Punta Ballena
- DAE: Pinares
- DAF: Cerro Pelado
- DAG: Hipódromo
- DAH: Maldonado Nuevo
- DAI: El Jagüel
- DAJ: Las Delicias

== Authorities ==
The authority of the municipality is the Municipal Council, integrated by the Mayor (who presides it) and four Councilors.

Mayors by period
N°	Mayor	Party	Start	End	Notes
1	Juan Carlos Bayeto	Broad Front	9 July 2010	8 July 2015	Elected Mayor; Councilors: María Cristina Olivera (FA), Lucía Dotti (FA), Jesús Bentancur (PN) and Héctor Adolfo Varela (PN).
2	Dina Fernández Chaves	National Party	9 July 2015	2020	Elected Mayor; Councilors: Gualberto Hernández (PN), Mario Scasso Burghi (PN), Luis Huelmo (FA) and Mario Alfaro Mendoza (FA).
