= Municipality of Tupambaé =

Municipality of Tupambaé Municipio de Tupambaé
- Municipality
- Municipality of Tupambaé
- Location of the municipality of Tupambaé within the department of Cerro Largo and Uruguay.
- Country: Uruguay
- Department: Cerro Largo
- Founded: 15 April 2013
- Seat: Tupambaé

Government
  - Mayor: Douglas Lucas de Olivera (PN)

Area
  - Total: 1,110.1 km^{2} (428.6 sq mi)

Population (2011)
  - Total: 1,339
  - Density: 1.206/km^{2} (3.124/sq mi)
- Time zone: UTC-3
- Constituencies: GGA and GGC

The municipality of Tupambaé is one of the nine municipalities of Cerro Largo Department, Uruguay. Its seat is the city of Tupambaé.

== Location ==
The municipality lies on the southwest area of the Cerro Largo Department.

== History ==
Through Decree N° 11/13 of 15 April 2013, the Departmental Board of Cerro Largo, following the proposal of the Departmental government, decreed the creation of a new municipality in the settlement of Tupambaé. This decree used the mechanism provided by the Law N° 18567 that allowed the creation of municipalities in settlements with less than 2000 inhabitants, provided that there is approval by the Departmental Board at the initiative of the Intendant. With Law N° 19319, under the directives of the Law N° 19272, its creation was effective and constituencies GGA and GGC of Cerro Largo Department were assigned to this municipality, while its territory was limited to the urban and suburban area of the corresponding cadastral locality.

However, in 25 October 2018, the Decree of the Departmental Board N° 28/2018 expanded the territory of the municipality, making it reach all of that corresponding to the constituencies of GGA and GGC.

== Authorities ==
The authority of the municipality is the Municipal Council, integrated by the Mayor (who presides it) and four Councilors.

Mayors by period
N°	Mayor	Party	Start	End	Notes
1	Douglas Lucas de Olivera	National Party	9 July 2015	2020	Elected Mayor
