= San José River (Uruguay) =

Location
- Country: Uruguay

The San José River (Uruguay) is a river located in Uruguay.

== See also ==
- List of rivers of Uruguay
