= Adriana Peña =

Uruguayan politician

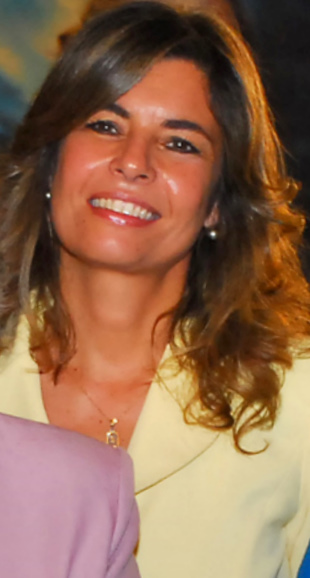
Adriana Peña

María Adriana Peña Hernández (born 9 March 1964 in Minas) is a Uruguayan dentist and politician, belonging to the National Party.

Since 2010 she has been the Intendant of Lavalleja Department, the first woman ever to hold that post.
