= Lago Merín =

- Village, resort
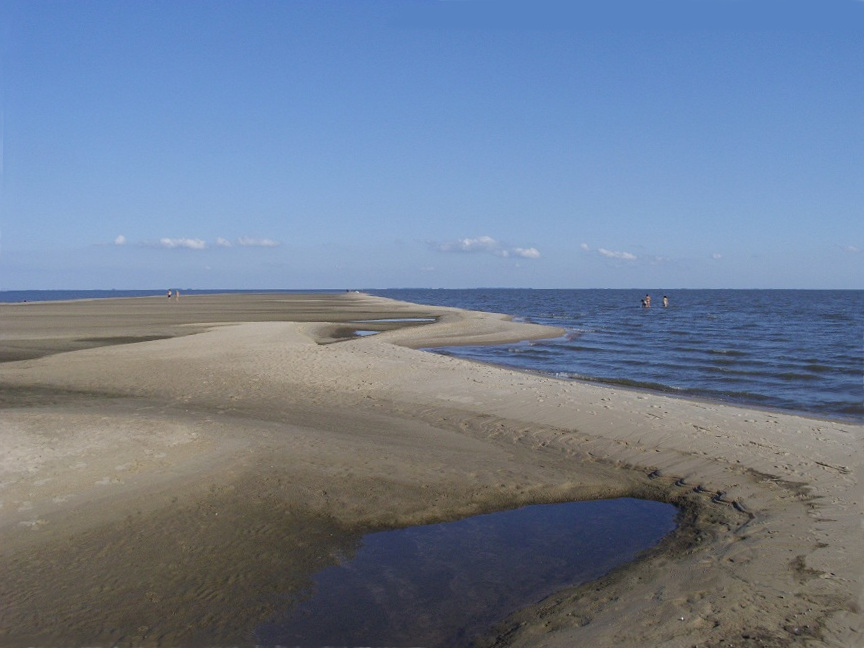
- Lago Merín's beach on the shore of Lagoon Merín in 2012

- Location in Uruguay
- Coordinates: 32°44′30″S 53°15′35″W
- Country: Uruguay
- Department: Cerro Largo Department

Population (2011)
  - Total: 439
- Time zone: UTC -3
- Postal code: 37100
- Dial plan: +598 4675 (+4 digits)

Lago Merín is a village and resort on the coast of Lagoon Merín, in the Cerro Largo Department of Uruguay. Although it has a very few permanent inhabitants, it is an important summer resort. In the last years it has become an important kitesurfing location.

== Geography ==
It is located near the borders.

== Population ==
Lago Merín was officially declared resort in 1940 by president Alfredo Baldomir. In 2011 Lago Merín had a population of 439.

| Year | Population |
|---|---|
| 1963 | 67 |
| 1975 | 65 |
| 1985 | 110 |
| 1996 | 247 |
| 2004 | 327 |
| 2011 | 439 |

Source: Instituto Nacional de Estadística de Uruguay
