= Municipalities of Uruguay =

Second-level administrative subdivision of Uruguay

Map of municipalities and departments of Uruguay as of 2025.

The Uruguayan departments are subdivided into municipalities and, as of 2025, there are 136 municipalities. This second level administrative division system was created by Law No. 18567 of 13 September 2009 and the first municipalities were created (or converted from Local Boards in the previous system) in March 2010. In the municipal elections of 2010 municipal authorities were elected for the first time and they assumed office months later.

Each municipality is governed by a local council, made up of 5 members. The chairperson of the local council is known as alcalde (mayor) and the remaining members are the councilors.

The Montevideo, Canelones and Maldonado departments are completely covered by municipalities, while the other departments have areas not included in any municipality.

== Description ==
=== Establishment of the system and creation of municipalities ===
The municipalities' system was created by Law No. 18567 of 13 September 2009. The current system is ruled by Law No. 19272 of 18 September 2014. This regulation provided that in settlements with more than 2,000 inhabitants a municipality was to be created including their surrounding territories, as long as it consisted in a social and cultural unit with their own common interests, that justified the creation of this kind of political entity. Settlements with less than 2,000 inhabitants were allowed to establish a municipality if the Departmental Board voted for it after the Intendant proposal, or by popular initiative of at least the 15% of voters in the settlement. Municipalities in departmental seats were only allowed to be created by Departmental Boards after the Intendant's proposal.

=== Election of authorities and government ===
The municipalities are governed by a local council made up by five members, whose chairperson is known as alcalde (mayor) and the other four members are known as concejales (councilors). They are elected by direct vote each municipal elections, at the same time the departmental authorities are elected.

== Criticism ==
There is an ongoing debate regarding this system, due to the high cost and low quality of public services, ambiguous mandates for citizen participation, and inefficient bureaucracy. Critics highlight, particularly in Montevideo, issues like slow responses to local infrastructure needs, excessive personnel, and a lack of effective horizontal coordination between different municipal jurisdictions.

== List of municipalities by department ==
=== Artigas ===

| # | Municipality | Population | Area | Major | Foundation |
|---|---|---|---|---|---|
| 1 | Baltasar Brum | 2,608 | 754.0 km^{2} | Juan Marticorena (PN) | 15 March 2010 |
| 2 | Bella Unión | 12,406 | 547.0 km^{2} | William Cresseri (PN) | 15 March 2010 |
| 3 | Tomás Gomensoro | 2,902 | 804.5 km^{2} | Federico Arbiza (PN) | 15 March 2010 |

=== Canelones ===

| # | Municipality | Population | Area | Major | Foundation |
|---|---|---|---|---|---|
| 1 | 18 de Mayo | 21,371 | 11.0 km^{2} | Adriana Sánchez (FA) | 20 March 2013 |
| 2 | Aguas Corrientes | 1,728 | 51.5 km^{2} | Marcelo Delgado (FA) | 15 March 2010 |
| 3 | Atlántida | 10,198 | 108.1 km^{2} | Gustavo González (FA) | 15 March 2010 |
| 4 | Barros Blancos | 29,865 | 22.8 km^{2} | Julián Rocha (FA) | 15 March 2010 |
| 5 | Canelones | 27,406 | 230.8 km^{2} | Darío Pimienta (FA) | 15 March 2010 |
| 6 | Ciudad de la Costa | 91,284 | 61.1 km^{2} | Sonia Misirian (FA) | 15 March 2010 |
| 7 | Colonia Nicolich | 14,788 | 26.0 km^{2} | Líber Moreno (FA) | 15 March 2010 |
| 8 | Empalme Olmos | 6,630 | 152.5 km^{2} | Jorge Álvarez (FA) | 15 March 2010 |
| 9 | La Floresta | 8,353 | 59.1 km^{2} | Néstor Erramouspe (FA) | 15 March 2010 |
| 10 | La Paz | 20,194 | 32.9 km^{2} | Bruno Fernández (FA) | 15 March 2010 |
| 11 | Las Piedras | 62,238 | 53.9 km^{2} | Gustavo González (FA) | 15 March 2010 |
| 12 | Los Cerrillos | 7,713 | 261.4 km^{2} | Néstor Roncio (FA) | 15 March 2010 |
| 13 | Migues | 3,802 | 363.3 km^{2} | Nahuel Jorge (PN) | 15 March 2010 |
| 14 | Montes | 1,842 | 55.5 km^{2} | Rodolfo Salvarrey (PN) | 15 March 2010 |
| 15 | Pando | 32,927 | 114.9 km^{2} | Alcides Pérez (FA) | 15 March 2010 |
| 16 | Parque del Plata | 11,054 | 12.8 km^{2} | Tania Vecchio (FA) | 15 March 2010 |
| 17 | Paso Carrasco | 20,842 | 20.7 km^{2} | Verónica Veiga (FA) | 15 March 2010 |
| 18 | Progreso | 14,292 | 78.5 km^{2} | Claudio Duarte (FA) | 15 March 2010 |
| 19 | Salinas | 23,447 | 83.7 km^{2} | Óscar Montero (FA) | 15 March 2010 |
| 20 | San Antonio | 3,283 | 168.6 km^{2} | Damaso Pani (PN) | 15 March 2010 |
| 21 | San Bautista | 3,684 | 196.5 km^{2} | Roberto Siriani (PN) | 15 March 2010 |
| 22 | San Jacinto | 6,691 | 274.9 km^{2} | Cristian Ferraro (PN) | 15 March 2010 |
| 23 | San Ramón | 8,087 | 249.3 km^{2} | Gonzalo Melogno (PN) | 15 March 2010 |
| 24 | Santa Lucía | 18,524 | 252.2 km^{2} | Leonardo Mollo (FA) | 15 March 2010 |
| 25 | Santa Rosa | 6,751 | 192.5 km^{2} | Ramiro Azor (FA) | 15 March 2010 |
| 26 | Sauce | 13,019 | 295.9 km^{2} | Juan Ottonello (PN) | 15 March 2010 |
| 27 | Soca | 3,959 | 493.1 km^{2} | Roberto Rodríguez (PN) | 15 March 2010 |
| 28 | Suárez | 18,153 | 44.0 km^{2} | Carlos Nalerio (FA) | 15 March 2010 |
| 29 | Tala | 9,308 | 522.1 km^{2} | Leonardo Pérez (PN) | 15 March 2010 |
| 30 | Toledo | 18,740 | 30.3 km^{2} | José Gini (FA) | 15 March 2010 |

=== Cerro Largo ===

| # | Municipality | Population | Area | Major | Foundation |
|---|---|---|---|---|---|
| 1 | Aceguá | 1,686 | 825.9 km^{2} | Javier Rodríguez (PN) | 22 March 2013 |
| 2 | Arbolito | 263 | 604.5 km^{2} | Luis Seguí (PN) | 22 March 2013 |
| 3 | Arévalo | 572 | 396.5 km^{2} | José Eduardo Lucas (PN) | 22 March 2013 |
| 4 | Bañado de Medina | 1,583 | 451.3 km^{2} | Daniel Cegade (PN) | 25 October 2018 |
| 5 | Centurión | 242 | 648.1 km^{2} | Juan Nery dos Santos (PN) | 25 October 2018 |
| 6 | Cerro de las Cuentas | 496 | 817.3 km^{2} | Humberto Allende (PN) | 25 October 2018 |
| 7 | Fraile Muerto | 3,450 | 407.1 km^{2} | Pablo Nauar (PN) | 15 March 2010 |
| 8 | Isidoro Noblía | 2,808 | 665.2 km^{2} | Favio Freire (PN) | 22 March 2013 |
| 9 | Laguna Merín | | | | |
| 10 | Las Cañas | 242 | 648.2 km^{2} | Víctor Noda (PN) | 25 October 2018 |
| 11 | Plácido Rosas | 602 | 524.8 km^{2} | Eduardo Fernández (PN) | 22 March 2013 |
| 12 | Quebracho | 497 | 701.2 km^{2} | Héctor Ortiz (PN) | 25 October 2018 |
| 13 | Ramón Trigo | 368 | 1,270.5 km^{2} | Durmen Menchaca (PN) | 22 March 2013 |
| 14 | Río Branco | 16,270 | 933.2 km^{2} | Christian Morel (PN) | 15 March 2010 |
| 15 | Tres Islas | 301 | 445.7 km^{2} | Carlos González (PN) | 25 October 2018 |
| 16 | Tupambaé | 1,269 | 1,110.1 km^{2} | Macarena Da Rosa (PN) | 22 March 2013 |

=== Colonia ===

| # | Municipality | Population | Area | Major | Foundation |
|---|---|---|---|---|---|
| 1 | Carmelo | 19,606 | 390.2 km^{2} | Alicia Espíndola (PN) | 15 March 2010 |
| 2 | Colonia Valdense | 4,535 | 147.4 km^{2} | Andrés Malan (PN) | 22 March 2013 |
| 3 | Florencio Sánchez | 4,040 | 295.6 km^{2} | Alfredo Sánchez (PN) | 22 March 2013 |
| 4 | Juan L. Lacaze | 13,635 | 107.3 km^{2} | Arturo Bentancor (FA) | 15 March 2010 |
| 5 | La Paz | 1,005 | 62 km^{2} | Walter Eduardo Miranda | 26 October 2018 |
| 6 | Miguelete | 1,814 | 720 km^{2} | María Elena Martin (PN) | 26 October 2018 |
| 7 | Nueva Helvecia | 11,224 | 95.1 km^{2} | Marcelo Alonso (PN) | 15 March 2010 |
| 8 | Nueva Palmira | 10,063 | 126.8 km^{2} | Agustín Callero (PN) | 15 March 2010 |
| 9 | Ombúes de Lavalle | 3,936 | 397.8 km^{2} | Marcelo Castro (PN) | 22 March 2013 |
| 10 | Rosario | 11,161 | 230.2 km^{2} | Pablo Maciel (PN) | 15 March 2010 |
| 11 | Tarariras | 7,788 | 484.4 km^{2} | Dany Pérez (PN) | 15 March 2010 |

=== Durazno ===

| # | Municipality | Population | Area | Major | Foundation |
|---|---|---|---|---|---|
| | Sarandí del Yí | 7,389 | 6,562 km^{2} | Carlos Luberriga (PN) | 15 March 2010 |
| | Villa del Carmen | 2,891 | 479.2 km^{2} | Fernando Rodríguez (PN) | 15 March 2010 |

=== Flores ===
| # | Municipality | Population | Area | Major | Foundation |
|---|---|---|---|---|---|
| | Ismael Cortinas | 914 | 0.95 km^{2} | Agustín Musa (PN) | 15 March 2010 |

=== Florida ===

| # | Municipality | Population | Area | Major | Foundation |
|---|---|---|---|---|---|
| 1 | Casupá | 2,228 | 94.7 km^{2} | Luis Oliva Monfort (PN) | 15 March 2010 |
| 2 | Fray Marcos | 3,432 | 279.4 km^{2} | Stella Tucuna (PN) | 15 March 2013 |
| 3 | Sarandí Grande | 6,509 | 211.5 km^{2} | Cayetano Stopingi (PN) | 15 March 2010 |

=== Lavalleja ===

| # | Municipality | Population | Area | Major | Foundation |
|---|---|---|---|---|---|
| 1 | José Batlle y Ordóñez | 2,283 | 784.1 km^{2} | Pablo Patiño (PN) | 27 March 2015 |
| 2 | José Pedro Varela | 5,398 | 851.8 km^{2} | Martín Rezk (PN) | 15 March 2010 |
| 3 | Mariscala | 1,830 | 634 km^{2} | Francisco de la Peña (PN) | 24 October 2018 |
| 4 | Solís de Mataojo | 2,924 | 101.6 km^{2} | Verónica Machado (PN) | 15 March 2010 |

=== Maldonado ===

| # | Municipality | Population | Area | Major | Foundation |
|---|---|---|---|---|---|
| 1 | Aiguá | 3,165 | 1,365.0 km^{2} | Ernesto San Román (PN) | 15 March 2010 |
| 2 | Garzón | 1,020 | 623.2 km^{2} | Nazareno Lazo (PN) | 15 March 2010 |
| 3 | Maldonado | 90,593 | 189.7 km^{2} | Andrés Rapetti (PN) | 15 March 2010 |
| 4 | Pan de Azúcar | 8,025 | 606.4 km^{2} | Alejandro Echavarria (PN) | 15 March 2010 |
| 5 | Piriápolis | 14,461 | 135.9 km^{2} | René Graña (PN) | 15 March 2010 |
| 6 | Punta del Este | 11,128 | 21.8 km^{2} | Javier Carballal (PN) | 15 March 2010 |
| 7 | San Carlos | 33,293 | 1,651.0 km^{2} | Carlos Pereyra (PN) | 15 March 2010 |
| 8 | Solís Grande | 2,613 | 204.9 km^{2} | Patricia Martínez (PN) | 15 March 2010 |

=== Montevideo ===
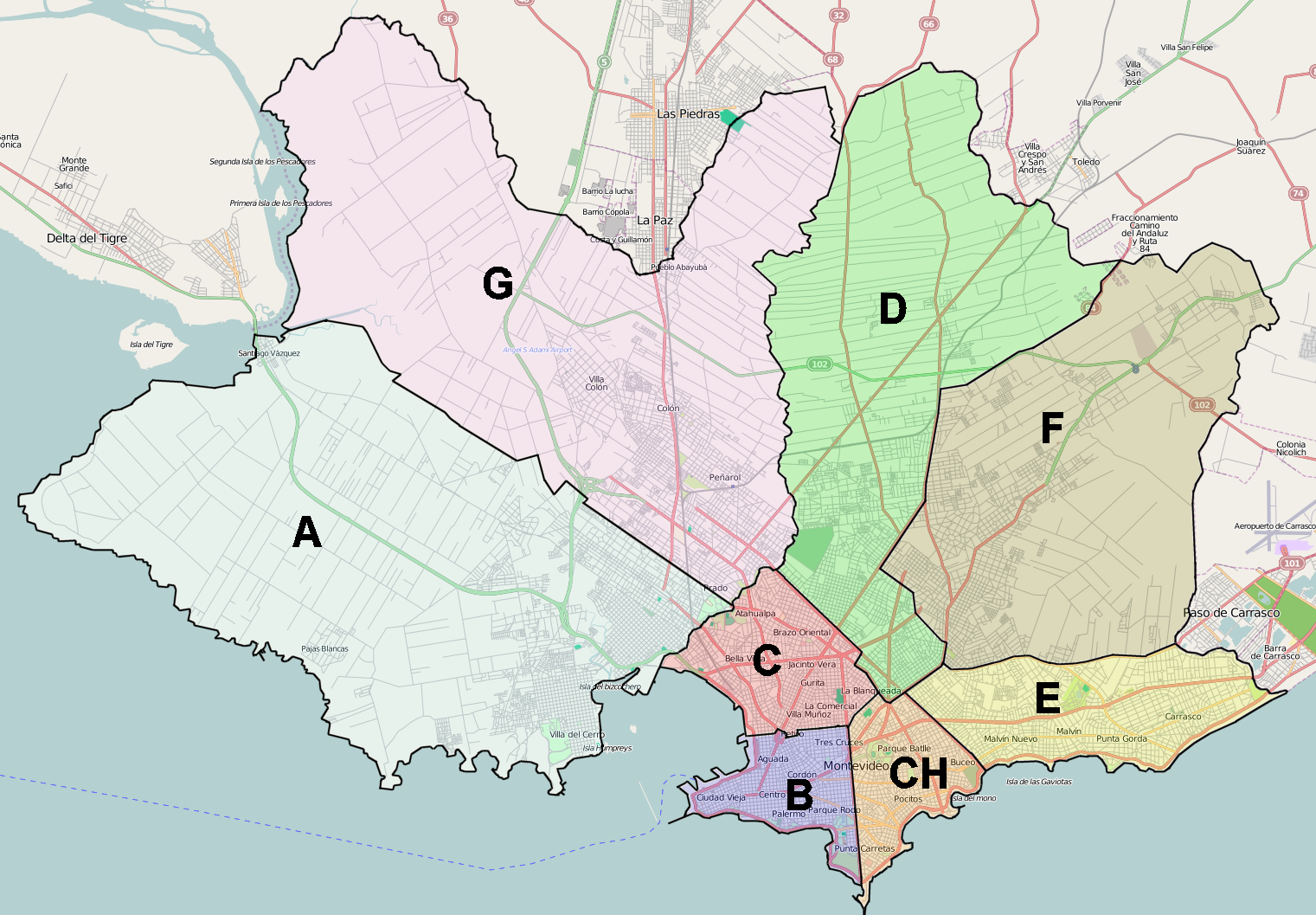

| # | Municipality | Population | Area | Major | Foundation |
|---|---|---|---|---|---|
| 1 | Municipality A | 207,911 | 144.2 km^{2} | Jorge Meroni (FA) | 15 March 2010 |
| 2 | Municipality B | 147,577 | 11.8 km^{2} | Silvana Pissano (FA) | 15 March 2010 |
| 3 | Municipality C | 148,952 | 17.6 km^{2} | Jorge Cabrera (FA) | 15 March 2010 |
| 4 | Municipality CH | 159,528 | 12.1 km^{2} | Matilde Antía (PN) | 15 March 2010 |
| 5 | Municipality D | 181,153 | 86.5 km^{2} | Gabriel Velazco (FA) | 15 March 2010 |
| 6 | Municipality E | 153,395 | 27.5 km^{2} | Mercedes Ruiz (PN) | 15 March 2010 |
| 7 | Municipality F | 168,937 | 85.0 km^{2} | Juan López (PN) | 15 March 2010 |
| 8 | Municipality G | 151,302 | 142.7 km^{2} | Leticia de Torres (FA) | 15 March 2010 |

=== Paysandú ===

| # | Municipality | Population | Area | Major | Foundation |
|---|---|---|---|---|---|
| 1 | Chapicuy | 1,382 | 1,043.6 km^{2} | Milton Laurencena (PN) | 21 March 2013 |
| 2 | Guichón | 6,860 | 1,670.1 km^{2} | Martín Álvarez (PN) | 15 March 2010 |
| 3 | Lorenzo Geyres | 1,704 | 938.7 km^{2} | Graciela Barrutte (PN) | 21 March 2013 |
| 4 | Piedras Coloradas | 1,956 | 1,192.7 km^{2} | Jhonn Cáceres (PN) | 21 March 2013 |
| 5 | Porvenir | 4,178 | 954.5 km^{2} | Ramiro Ayende (PN) | 15 March 2010 |
| 6 | Quebracho | 3,671 | 1,088.4 km^{2} | Silbia Visoso (PN) | 15 March 2010 |
| 7 | Tambores | 1,475 | 2,388.0 km^{2} | Ricardo Soares (PN) | 21 March 2013 |

=== Río Negro ===

| # | Municipality | Population | Area | Major | Foundation |
|---|---|---|---|---|---|
| 1 | Nuevo Berlín | 2,604 | 498.7 km^{2} | Hernán Godoy (PN) | 15 March 2010 |
| 2 | San Javier | 2,830 | 817.8 km^{2} | Washington Laco (PN) | 22 March 2013 |
| 3 | Young | 17,550 | 1,039.8 km^{2} | Inés Long (PN) | 15 March 2010 |

=== Rivera ===

| # | Municipality | Population | Area | Major | Foundation |
|---|---|---|---|---|---|
| 1 | Minas de Corrales | 3,985 | 381.7 km^{2} | José González (PC) | 15 March 2010 |
| 2 | Tranqueras | 8,190 | 976.6 km^{2} | Luciano Viera (PC) | 15 March 2010 |
| 3 | Vichadero | 4,048 | 510.5 km^{2} | Luis Alberto Coutinho (PN) | 15 March 2010 |

=== Rocha ===

| # | Municipality | Population | Area | Major | Foundation |
|---|---|---|---|---|---|
| 1 | Castillos | 9,651 | 2,152.6 km^{2} | Juan Manuel Olivera (PN) | 15 March 2010 |
| 2 | Chuy | 9,758 | 92.8 km^{2} | Eduardo Calabuig (PN) | 15 March 2010 |
| 3 | La Paloma | 5,516 | 247.7 km^{2} | Sergio Muniz (FA) | 15 March 2010 |
| 4 | Lascano | 7,922 | 745.5 km^{2} | Víctor Larrosa (PN) | 15 March 2010 |

=== Salto ===

| # | Municipality | Population | Area | Major | Foundation |
|---|---|---|---|---|---|
| 1 | Belén | 2,269 | 164.7 km^{2} | Luis Zuliani (FA) | 15 March 2010 |
| 2 | Colonia Lavalleja | 2,478 | 1,472.6 km^{2} | Antonio Tejeira (PN) | 15 March 2010 |
| 3 | Mataojo | 1,028 | 2,241.5 km^{2} | Rosita Moreno (FA) | 15 March 2010 |
| 4 | San Antonio | 3,865 | 430.8 km^{2} | Sandra Toncobitz (PC) | 15 March 2010 |
| 5 | Rincón de Valentín | 1,203 | 872.8 km^{2} | Santiago Dalmao (FA) | 15 March 2010 |
| 6 | Villa Constitución | 3,896 | 1,537.8 km^{2} | Carlos Souto (FA) | 15 March 2010 |

=== San José ===

| # | Municipality | Population | Area | Major | Foundation |
|---|---|---|---|---|---|
| 1 | Ciudad del Plata | 32,154 | 125.8 km^{2} | Marianita Fonseca (PN) | 15 March 2010 |
| 2 | Ecilda Paullier | 5,025 | 694.7 km^{2} | Leonardo Giménez (PN) | 22 March 2013 |
| 3 | Libertad | 14,326 | 441.9 km^{2} | Matías Santos (PN) | 15 March 2010 |
| 4 | Rodríguez | 4,849 | 1,167.3 km^{2} | Norberto Zunino (PN) | 22 March 2013 |

=== Soriano ===

| # | Municipality | Population | Area | Major | Foundation |
|---|---|---|---|---|---|
| 1 | Cardona | 5,029 | 356.1 km^{2} | Ruben Valentín (PN) | 15 March 2010 |
| 2 | Dolores | 19,577 | 413.7 km^{2} | Juan Oronoz (PN) | 15 March 2010 |
| 3 | José Enrique Rodó | 3,077 | 396.3 km^{2} | Washington Loitey (PN) | 27 March 2015 |
| 4 | Palmitas | 2,304 | 178.7 km^{2} | Juan Vincon (PN) | 27 March 2015 |

=== Tacuarembó ===
| # | Municipality | Population | Area | Major | Foundation |
|---|---|---|---|---|---|
| 1 | Ansina | 3,289 | 792.2 km^{2} | Ana Isabel Camejo (PN) | 27 March 2015 |
| 2 | Paso de los Toros | 13,232 | 560.3 km^{2} | Luis Irigoin (PN) | 15 March 2010 |
| 3 | San Gregorio de Polanco | 3,722 | 444.7 km^{2} | Asdrúbal Rodríguez (PN) | 15 March 2010 |

=== Treinta y Tres ===

| # | Municipality | Population | Area | Major | Foundation |
|---|---|---|---|---|---|
| 1 | Cerro Chato | 1,407 | km^{2} | Elías Javier Fuentes (PN) | 22 December 2017 |
| 2 | Enrique Martínez | 1,246 | km^{2} | Nidia Vera (PN) | 22 December 2017 |
| 3 | Rincón | 1,767 | km^{2} | Eduardo Gonzales (PN) | 22 December 2017 |
| 4 | Santa Clara de Olimar | 2,485 | 482.4 km^{2} | Pablo Echevarría (PN) | 15 March 2010 |
| 5 | Vergara | 4,064 | 622.5 km^{2} | José González (PN) | 15 March 2010 |
| 6 | Villa Sara | 1,724 | 534 km^{2} | Analía Larrañaga (PN) | 22 December 2017 |
