= Olimar Chico River =

Coordinates: 33°13′59″S 54°30′55″W

Location
- Country: Uruguay

The Olimar Chico River is a river in Uruguay.

== See also ==
- List of rivers of Uruguay
