= Hipódromo, Cerro Largo =

Hipódromo
- Barrio
- Location in Uruguay
- Coordinates: 32°22′0″S 54°12′0″W
- Country: Uruguay
- Department: Cerro Largo Department

Population (2011)
  - Total: 505
- Time zone: UTC -3
- Postal code: 37000
- Dial plan: +598 464 (+5 digits)

Hipódromo is a barrio (neighbourhood or district) of Melo, the capital of Cerro Largo Department of eastern Uruguay. It derives its name from the Hipódromo de Melo, the horse racing track of the city which it contains.

== Geography ==
This barrio is located on Route 7, west of the city. The stream Arroyo Conventos flows between this barrio and the city.

== Population ==
In 2011 Hipódromo had a population of 505.

Year	Population
1963	318
1975	413
1985	366
1996	432
2004	480
2011	505

Source: Instituto Nacional de Estadística de Uruguay
