= Arroyo Canelón Grande =

River in Canelones, Uruguay

Coordinates: 34°30′S 56°23′W

Arroyo Canelón Grande is a river in Uruguay.

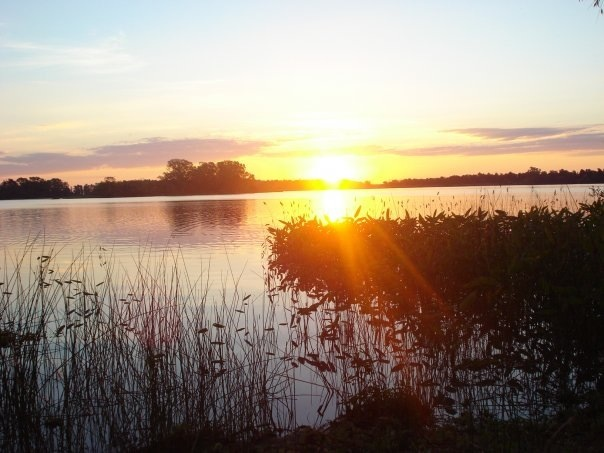
View of Arroyo Canelón Grande

It originates in the Department of Canelones in the Cuchilla Grande in the area of the locality of San Bautista. From there, it runs in an east–west direction to the border of the San José Department. Here, it flows north of Aguas Corrientes on the southern edge of the city Santa Lucía on the left into the Santa Lucía River.
