= Municipality of Tres Islas =

Cerro Largo Department municipality, Uruguay

Municipality of Tres Islas Municipio de Tres Islas
- Municipality
- Municipality of Tres Islas
- Location of the municipality of Tres Islas within the department of Cerro Largo and Uruguay.
- Coordinates: 32.515°S 54.6886°W
- Country: Uruguay
- Department: Cerro Largo
- Founded: 30 October 2018
- Seat: Tres Islas

Government
  - Mayor: Carlos Eduardo Gonzalez (PN)

Area
  - Total: 445.7 km^{2} (172.1 sq mi)

Population (2011)
  - Total: 301
  - Density: 0.675/km^{2} (1.75/sq mi)
- Time zone: UTC-3
- Constituencies: GFA

The municipality of Tres Islas is one of the municipalities of Cerro Largo Department, Uruguay, established on 30 October 2018. Its seat is the town of Tres Islas.

== History ==
This municipality was created on 30 October 2018 by Departmental Board of Cerro Largo Decree No. 29/2018, covering the same territory of the electoral constituency identified by the Electoral Board of Cerro Largo as series GFA.

== Location ==
The municipality is located at the west area of Cerro Largo Department. Its seat is the town of Tres Islas.

== Authorities ==
The authority of the municipality is the Municipal Council, integrated by the Mayor (who presides it) and four Councilors.

Mayors by period
N°	Mayor	Party	Start	End	Notes
1	Carlos Eduardo Gonzalez	National Party	November 2020	Incumbent	Elected Mayor.
