= Tomás Gomensoro Albín =

Uruguayan political figure

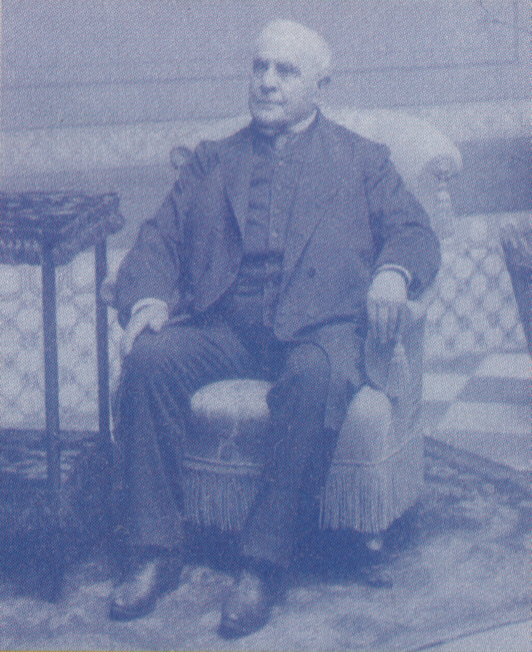
Tomás Gomensoro Albín.

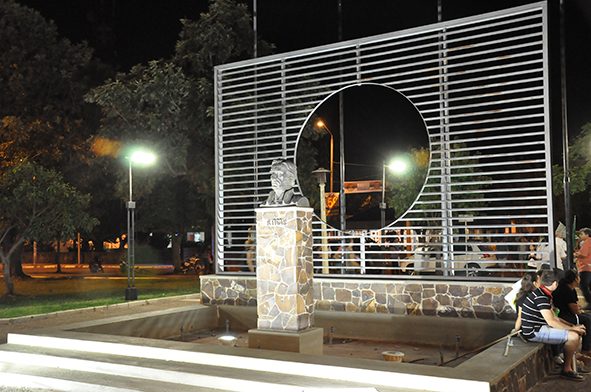
Monument to Artigas in the locality of Tomás Gomensoro (2015).

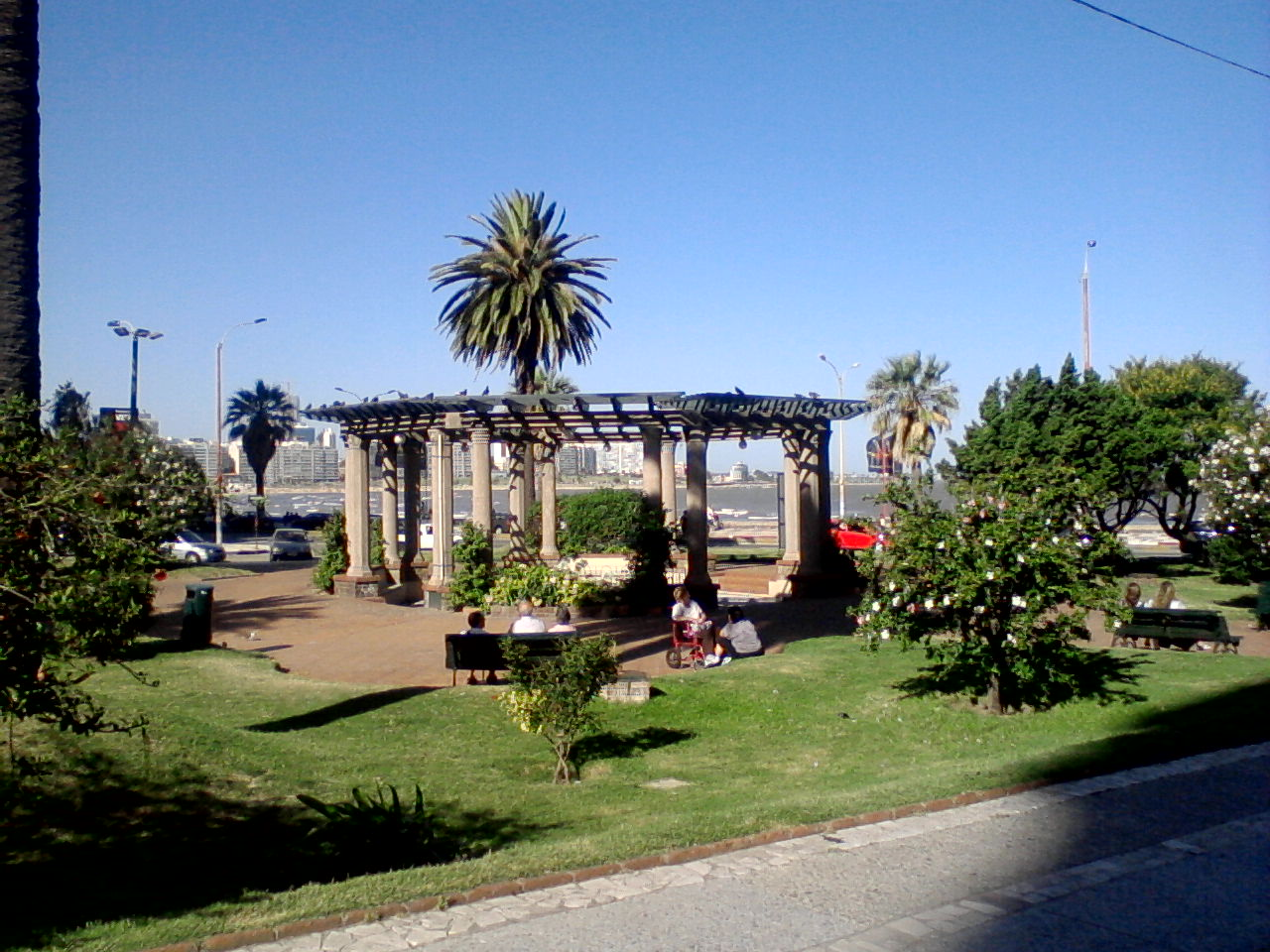
Gomensoro Square in Pocitos neighbourhood, near the seashore (2012).

Tomás José Gomensoro Albín (27 January 1810 – 12 April 1900) was a Uruguayan political figure.

== Background ==
Born in Dolores, Soriano, Uruguay, he was a member of the Colorado Party (Uruguay). He served as President of the Senate of Uruguay from 1871 to 1872.

In March 1872, President of Uruguay Lorenzo Batlle stepped down from office.

== President of Uruguay (interim) ==
From 1872 to 1873 Gomensoro served as President of Uruguay (interim).

While his term office was intended to be temporary in nature, it actually lasted almost one year. In February 1873 he was succeeded as president by José Eugenio Ellauri.

== Death and commemoration ==
He served second time as President of the Senate of Uruguay from 1892 to 1893. Gomensoro died in 1900, having attained the age of 90.

== Honors ==
- The town of Tomás Gomensoro in the Artigas Department of northern Uruguay is named after him.
- An urban square in the Pocitos neighbourhood of Montevideo, facing the Rambla of Montevideo, bears his name.

== See also ==
- Tomas Gomensoro#Location and history
- Politics of Uruguay
- Colorado Party (Uruguay)#Earlier History

Political offices
Preceded by Lorenzo Batlle y Grau	President of Uruguay; Acting; 1872-1873	Succeeded by José Eugenio Ellauri
Records
Preceded by Pedro de Aycinena y Piñol	Oldest living state leader 14 May 1897 – 12 April 1900	Succeeded by Leo XIII
