= Walter Zimmer =

Uruguayan physician (born 1945)

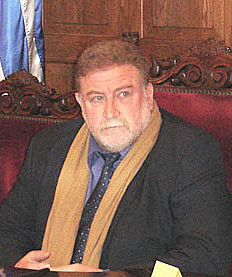
Image of Walter Zimmer

Walter Zimmer González (Nueva Helvecia, 28 May 1945), Uruguayan physician and politician. He was mayor of the department of Colonia representing the National Party between 2005 and 2015.

== Early life ==
Walter Zimmer was born in Nueva Helvecia, Colonia Department, on May 28, 1945. His parents were Octavio Zimmer and María Rosa González. He is of Swiss German descent.

He completed his secondary education at the “Daniel Armand Ugón” liceo (secondary school) in Colonia Valdense. In 1962 he entered the Faculty of Medicine at the University of the Republic, where he focused on surgery.

== Political life ==
In his early years, Zimmer was a peripheral member of the National Liberation Movement – Tupamaros, which shaped his strong relationships with government members, even after being elected by the National Party. While he claims to have never fired a shot during Uruguay's "dirty war," he admitted in a 2011 interview, "I did more than just carry a piece of paper," acknowledging his involvement with the movement.

Zimmer's family has deep ties to the National Party, and he began his political activity on his father's 19th list in Colonia Suiza. Moving to Montevideo in 1963 to study medicine, Zimmer was influenced by the Argentine student protests, the Cuban Revolution, and eventually joined the Christian Democratic Party (PDC). Later, he sympathized with the March 26 Movement, the political arm of the Tupamaros.

During Jorge Pacheco Areco's presidency (1967–1972) and the civil-military dictatorship (1973–1985), Zimmer faced personal challenges. He was briefly imprisoned and beaten while interning in Artigas but continued opposing the dictatorship. Graduating as a doctor in 1974, he settled in Colonia in 1979 as a surgeon, still identifying with Tupamaro ideals.

Zimmer formed a clandestine group with members of the March 26 Movement in Colonia and remained active in grassroots committees until disagreements with Communist Party directives led to his departure from the Frente Amplio in 1984. He parted ways with the party, saying, "I’m leaving through the front door, the same way I came in."

After a two-year break from politics, Zimmer reconnected with the National Party through a friend, Juan Carlos Curbelo, then mayor of Colonia. He later joined the National Movement of Rocha, Desafío Nacional, and ultimately Alianza Nacional, led by Jorge Larrañaga.

Zimmer describes himself as a “progressive nationalist” with leftist leanings, aiming to bring progressive ideals to the National Party. “I believe leftism and progressivism are not exclusive to the Frente Amplio,” he stated.

In 2005, Zimmer became mayor of Colonia but continued working as a doctor. In one notable incident in January 2012, he stopped to assist at an accident on Route 1, an anecdote that highlights his dedication to medicine.

== Criminal prosecution ==
As part of the so-called “Guerra de las Patentes", the Patent Wars, and due to administrative measures that benefited municipal finances, Zimmer was prosecuted and imprisoned on 28 March 2014, for abuse of functions. After spending 70 days in prison, he was released on 5 June 2014, and resumed his role as mayor.

Maintaining his innocence, Zimmer appealed the decision, and on 12 June 2017, the Court of Appeals unanimously acquitted him of all charges. The ruling emphasized the importance of carefully defining and limiting the scope of "abuse of functions."

Following the acquittal, Zimmer expressed at a press conference: "What I feel is deeply personal. Justice was served for me, and reparation was made, but the harm done to my family and friends remains unresolved. It gives me strength that people know Zimmer is innocent."

== Falklands Island advocacy ==
Zimmer is an advocate for Argentines who favour Argentine sovereignty over the Falkland Islands. Zimmer also volunteered as a doctor during the Falklands conflict.

== Awards ==
- 2014, Legion of the Book Award from the Uruguayan Chamber of Books.
