= Quebracho, Paysandú =

Quebracho
- Town
- Location in Uruguay
- Coordinates: 31°56′10″S 57°54′10″W
- Country: Uruguay
- Department: Paysandú Department

Population (2011)
  - Total: 2,853
- Time zone: UTC -3
- Postal code: 60001
- Dial plan: +598 4754 (+4 digits)

Quebracho is a small town (villa) in Paysandú Department in Uruguay.

== Geography ==
It is located 5 kilometres (3.1 mi) into a road that splits off Route 3 in a westward direction, about 52 kilometres (32 mi) north-northeast of the department capital city of Paysandú. The railroad track Salto - Paysandú passes through this town.

== History ==
On 20 August 1947, the existing "urban nucleus" was elevated to "Pueblo" (village) category by the Act of Ley Nº 10.923. Until then it had been the head of the judicial section "Sarandí". On 15 October 1963, its status was elevated to "Villa" (town) by the Act of Ley Nº 13.167.

== Population ==
In 2011, Quebracho had a population of 2,853.

Year	Population
1908	1,432
1963	1,256
1975	1,507
1985	1,890
1996	2,337
2004	2,813
2011	2,853

Source: Instituto Nacional de Estadística de Uruguay

== Places of worship ==
- St. Thérèse of Lisieux Parish Church (Roman Catholic)
