= Tomás Gomensoro, Artigas =

Tomás Gomensoro
- Village
- Location in Uruguay
- Coordinates: 30°26′0″S 57°26′0″W
- Country: Uruguay
- Department: Artigas Department

Population (2011)
  - Total: 2,659
- Time zone: UTC -3
- Postal code: 55002
- Dial plan: +598 4777 (+4 digits)

Tomás Gomensoro is a village (pueblo) in the Artigas Department of northern Uruguay.

== Geography ==
It is located on a road that joins Route 3 with Route 30, about 27 kilometres (17 mi) southeast of Bella Unión. The railroad track Salto - Bella Unión passes through the village.

== History ==
Its earlier name was "Zanja Honda" and it was declared as "Pueblo" by the Act of Ley 3.455 on 3 May 1909. The village was then renamed after the acting President of Uruguay Tomás Gomensoro Albín.

== Population ==
In 2011, Tomás Gomensoro had a population of 2,659.

Year	Population
1908	1,188
1963	2,144
1975	2,100
1985	1,827
1996	2,427
2004	2,818
2011	2,659

Source: Instituto Nacional de Estadística de Uruguay

== Notable people ==
- Bibiano Zapirain (1919–2000), footballer

== See also ==
- Tomás Gomensoro Albín#Town in Artigas Department named after Gomensoro
