= Santa Lucía River =

River in Uruguay

Coordinates: 34°47′10″S 56°21′30″W

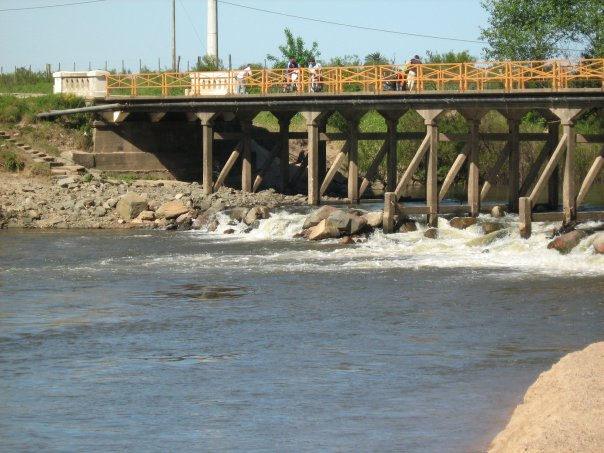
Santa Lucía River at San Ramón

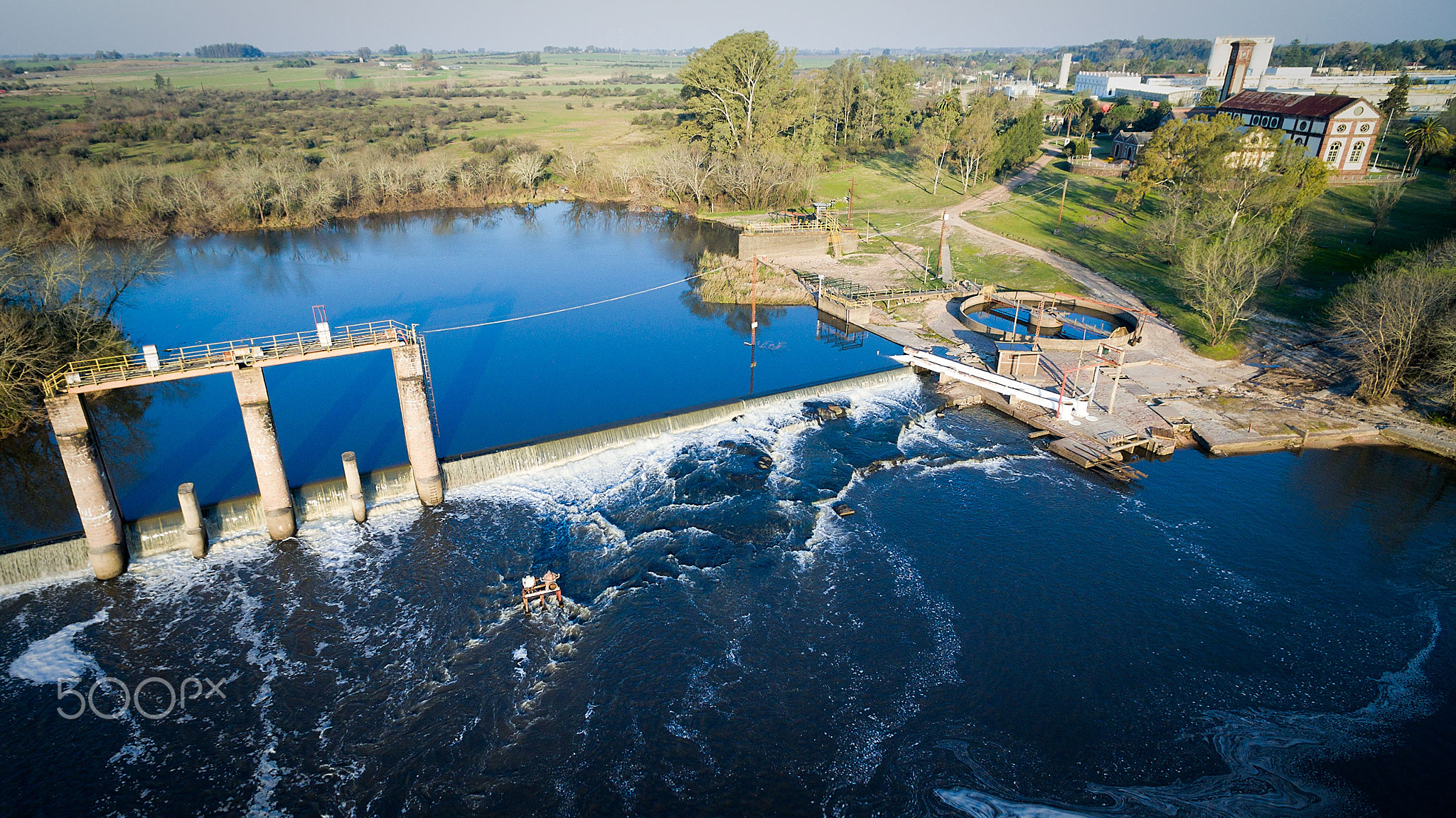
The OSE water reservoir and purification station at Aguas Corrientes.

The Santa Lucía River (Spanish: Río Santa Lucía) is a river in Uruguay.

== Course ==
The headwaters of the Santa Lucía River are in the Lavalleja department. For a large part of its course it forms the limit between the departments of Florida and San José on one bank and Canelones and Montevideo on the other. Its outlet is the Río de la Plata, forming a small delta, in which Tiger Island is located.

== Economic importance ==
It is the principal watercourse of southern Uruguay. It is the primary source of drinking water for Montevideo and other localities in the south of the country, in 2017 serving over 60% population of Uruguay with drinking water. A harmful algae bloom in 2013, that changed the flavor and odour of the drinking water trigger public concern about water quality, resulting in a government action plan to track the quality and try to clean up the water body.

The river is part of an important agricultural zone in Uruguay producing maize and corn.

== Environmental issues ==
Because of its location in an important agricultural zone in the South of Uruguay, nutrient runoff and eutrophication is common due to intensive agriculture. A 2008-2009 study found phosphorus and nitrogen pollution exceeding both local and international standards and causing algae blooms. Additionally, a 2022 paper found that herbicide use in the basin further amplified the eutrophication.

The river is heavily used as a water supply in Uruguay. With no plans made to mitigate the impacts of a drought, there was a water crisis from 2022 to 2023.

Since a 2013 algea bloom, the Canelones Department and national government have been encouraging dairy farmers and other animal agriculture producers to improve their effluent management from animal operations, including settling basins and other waste management practices.

== See also ==
- Geography of Uruguay#Topography and hydrography
