= Aguas Corrientes =

- Town
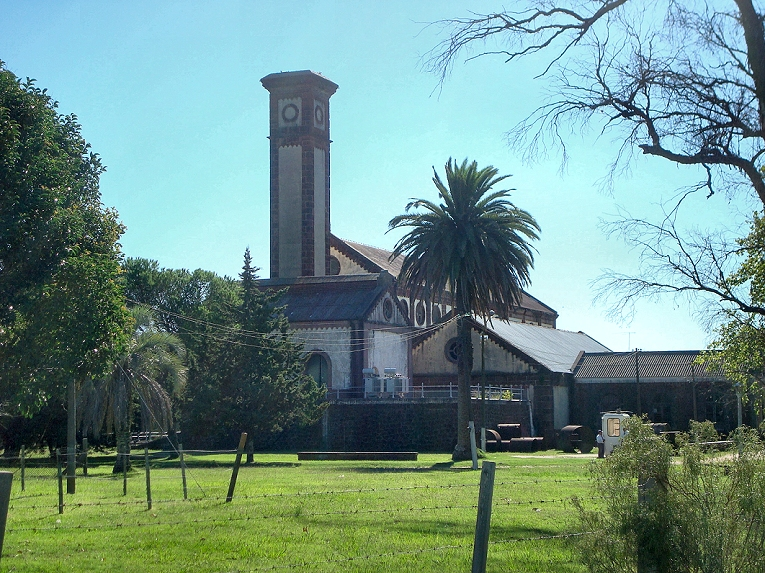
- The old water purification plant.

- Location in Uruguay
- Coordinates: 34°31′18″S 56°23′36″W
- Country: Uruguay
- Department: Canelones Department

Population (2011)
  - Total: 1,047
- Time zone: UTC -3
- Postal code: 90701
- Dial plan: +598 433 (+5 digits)

Aguas Corrientes is a small town in the Canelones Department of southern Uruguay. Its name (running waters) is derived from the installations of pumping, filtration and purification of water from the Santa Lucía River, which is the largest in the country, supplying drinking water to the departments of Montevideo and Canelones.

Aguas Corrientes is also the name of the municipality to which the town belongs.

== Location ==
The town is located 13 kilometres (8.1 mi) from the provincial capital of Canelones, 7 kilometres (4.3 mi) from Santa Lucía, and 56 kilometres (35 mi) from Montevideo. The banks of Santa Lucia river form the northwestern limits of the town.

== History ==
Santa Lucía River was chosen by the national government as a source for drinking water for the city of Montevideo between 1867 and 1871. The construction of the water treatment facility started in 1870 and was inaugurated on 18 July 1871. The plant was first established with British capital and then passed into the hands of the state in 1949. The first people who moved here were the workers and personnel of the plant with their families. A public school was inaugurated in 1882. On 26 November 1923 it was declared a "Pueblo" (town) by decree Ley N° 7.651 and on 19 October 1971 its status was elevated to "Villa" (village) by decree Ley N° 14.037. Today the surrounding area is mainly agricultural and the town is a small commercial center, including services for the agricultural activities.

== Population ==
According to the 2011 census, Aguas Corrientes had a population of 1,047. In 2010, the Intendencia de Canelones had estimated a population of 2,180 for the municipality during the elections. Much of its population is employed by the OSE Water Treatment Plant.

Location map of the Municipality of Aguas Corrientes

Year	Population
1963	961
1975	1,001
1985	1,025
1996	1,046
2004	1,095
2011	1,047

Source: Instituto Nacional de Estadística de Uruguay

== Sports ==
The town is home to a football club and a yacht club.
