= Cerro Largo Department =

Department of Uruguay

Cerro Largo
- Department
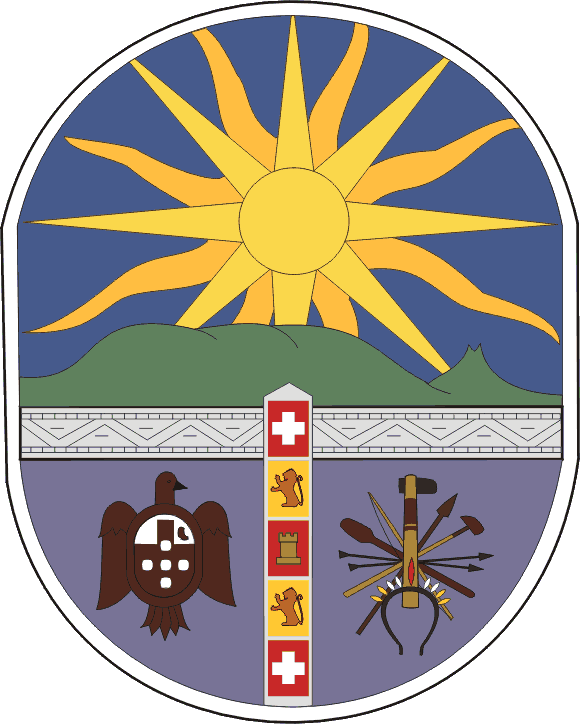
- Flag Coat of arms

- Location of Cerro Largo Department in Uruguay
- Coordinates (Melo): 32°22′S 54°11′W
- Country: Uruguay
- Inception: 1821
- Capital of Department: Melo

Government
  - Intendant: José Yurramendi
  - Ruling party: Partido Nacional

Area
  - Total: 13,648 km^{2} (5,270 sq mi)
- Elevation: 144 m (472 ft)

Population (2023 census)
  - Total: 91,025
  - Density: 6.6695/km^{2} (17.274/sq mi)
- Demonym(s): arachán, cerrolarguense
- Time zone: UTC-3 (UYT)
- ISO 3166 code: UY-CL
- Website: Official site

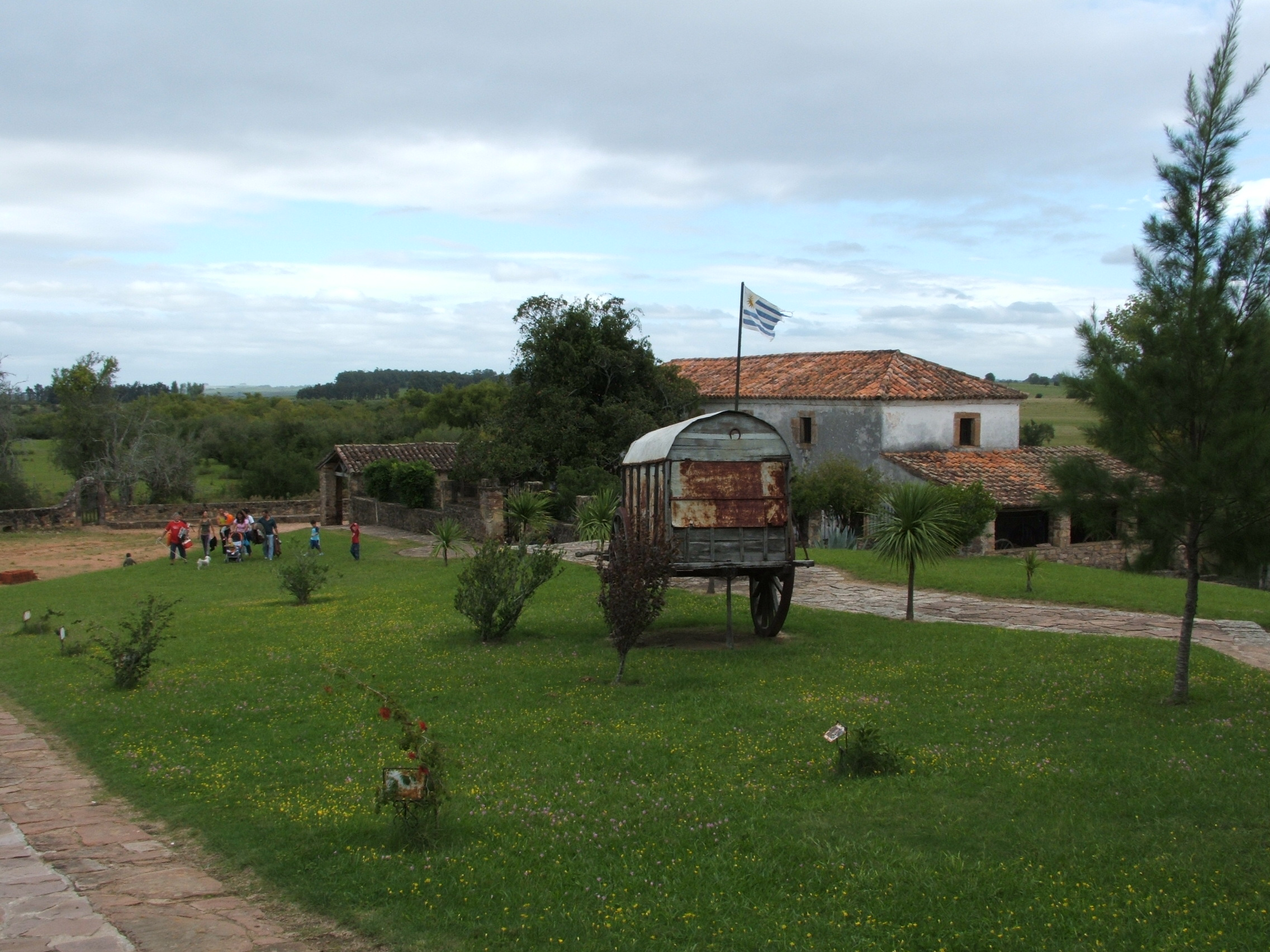
The Historic site of the Old Posta del Chuy, near Melo.

Cerro Largo Department (Spanish pronunciation: [ˈsero ˈlaɾɣo]) is a department of Uruguay. Its capital is Melo. It is located in the east of the country, bordering Brazil to its northeast with Yaguaron River as the natural border, Treinta y Tres Department to its south, Durazno Department to its west and the departments of Tacuarembó and Rivera to its northwest with Negro River as its natural border with them.

== History ==
At the end of the 18th century, apart from the indigenous people, the area was populated by the Spanish and the Portuguese alike. In 1795, the Captain of the Spanish Infantry Agustín de la Rosa founded the town of Melo, a fortress to repel attacks of the Portuguese and the Indios. The territory was invaded by the Portuguese in 1801, 1811, and 1816. The history of this place is marked by battles before, during and after the Independence of the Republic.

The old Posta del Chuy, 15 kilometres (9.3 mi) from the town, was the historic Inn where travellers from Melo to Villa Artigas (the actual Río Branco) could rest and pay the fares for using the first public work of the Republic, the stone bridge over the stream Chuy del Tacuarí, today a Heritage Monument, built in 1855 by the French Basque brothers Etcheverry.

In 1830, when Uruguay was divided in nine departments, Cerro Largo was one of them, including the biggest part of what was later separated as the Treinta y Tres Department.

During the 19th and early 20th centuries, when intermittent periods of civil war occurred in Uruguay, the department was a stronghold of the Blanco party. This was the precursor of the Partido Nacional.

Local people are usually known as "arachanes", in memory of an extinct local ethnicity, the Arachán people.

== Demographics ==
Ethnic groups in Cerro Largo (2023 est.)
Ethnic groups	Percent
White	86.1%
Black	13.0%
Indigenous	5.5%
Asian	0.6%
None/Other/Unspecified	4.4%

As of the census of 2011, Cerro Largo Department had a population of 84,698 (41,050 male and 43,648 female) and 35,841 households.

Demographic data for Florida Department in 2010:

- Population growth rate: 0.571%
- Birth Rate: 15.95 births/1,000 people
- Death Rate: 8.64 deaths/1,000 people
- Average age: 32.1 (31.0 male, 33.0 female)
- Life Expectancy at Birth:
  - Total population: 75.86 years
  - Male: 72.58 years
  - Female: 79.04 years
- Average per household income: 18,880 pesos/month
- Urban per capita income: 7,801 pesos/month

2010 Data Source:

Main Urban Centres
Other towns and villages
Population stated according to the 2011 census.

City / Town	Population
Melo	51,830
Río Branco	14,604
Fraile Muerto	3,168
Isidoro Noblía	2,331
Aceguá	1,511
Tupambaé	1,122

Town / Village	Population
Barrio López Benítez	522
Hipódromo	505
Lago Merín	439
Plácido Rosas	415
Barrio La Vinchuca	388

Rural population

According to the 2011 census, Cerro Largo department has a rural population of 5,936.

== Map of the department ==
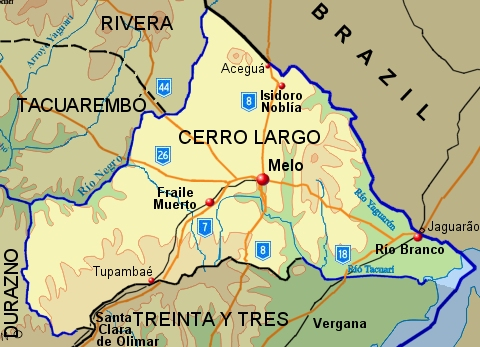
Topographic map of Cerro Largo Department showing main populated places and roads

== Notable people ==
- Aparicio Saravia was a prominent National (Blanco) Party leader, who died following the Battle of Masoller in 1904.
- Villanueva Saravia was a regional National (Blanco) Party leader.
- Rodolfo Nin Novoa has been Vice President of Uruguay (2005-2010).

== See also ==
- List of populated places in Uruguay § Cerro Largo Department

== Bibliography ==
- Domínguez, Carlos María (2004). El norte profundo (in Spanish). Montevideo: Ediciones de la Banda Oriental.
