= San Carlos, Uruguay =

City and municipality in Maldonado, Uruguay

San Carlos
- City & Municipality.
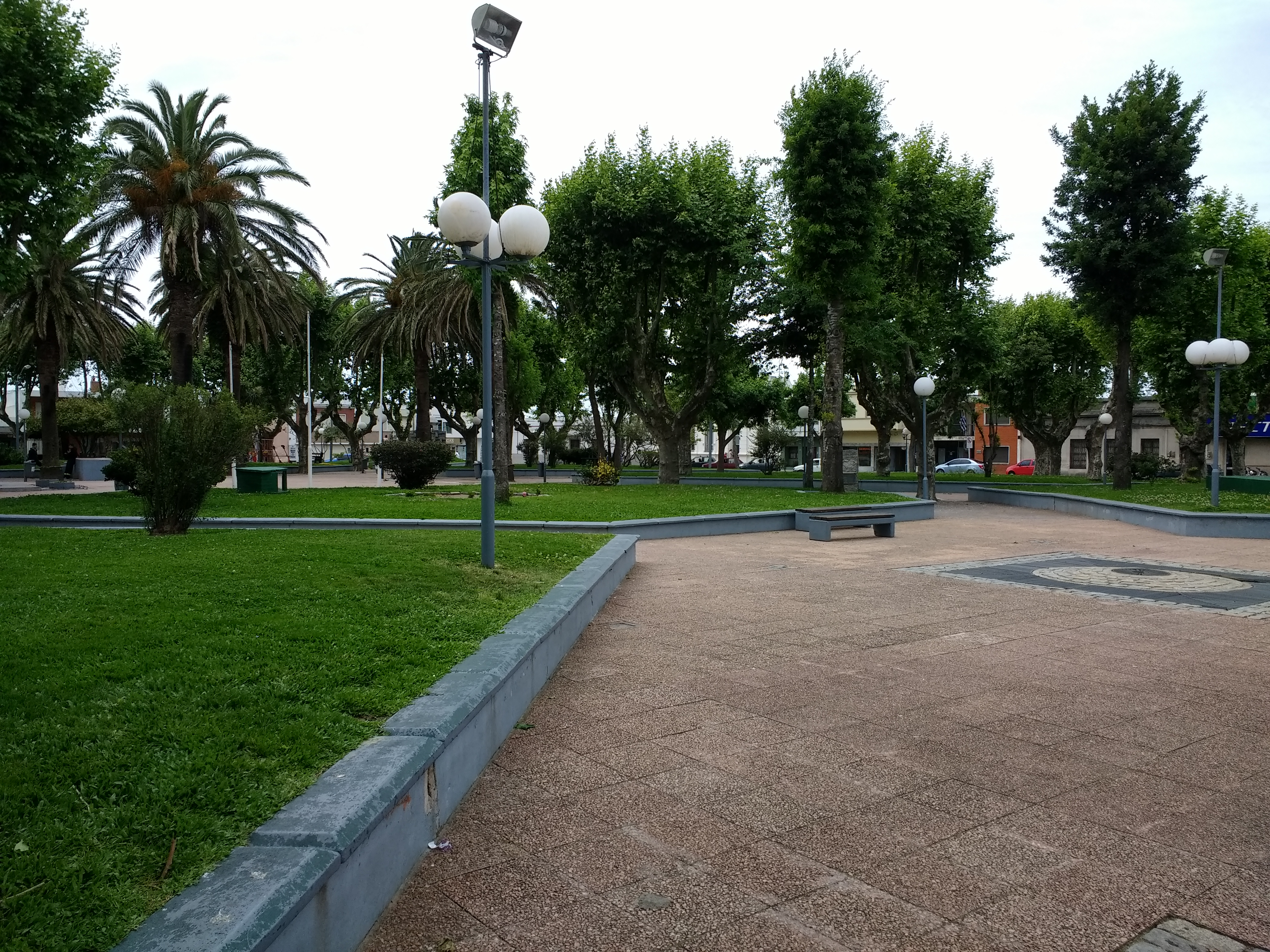
- Plaza Artigas

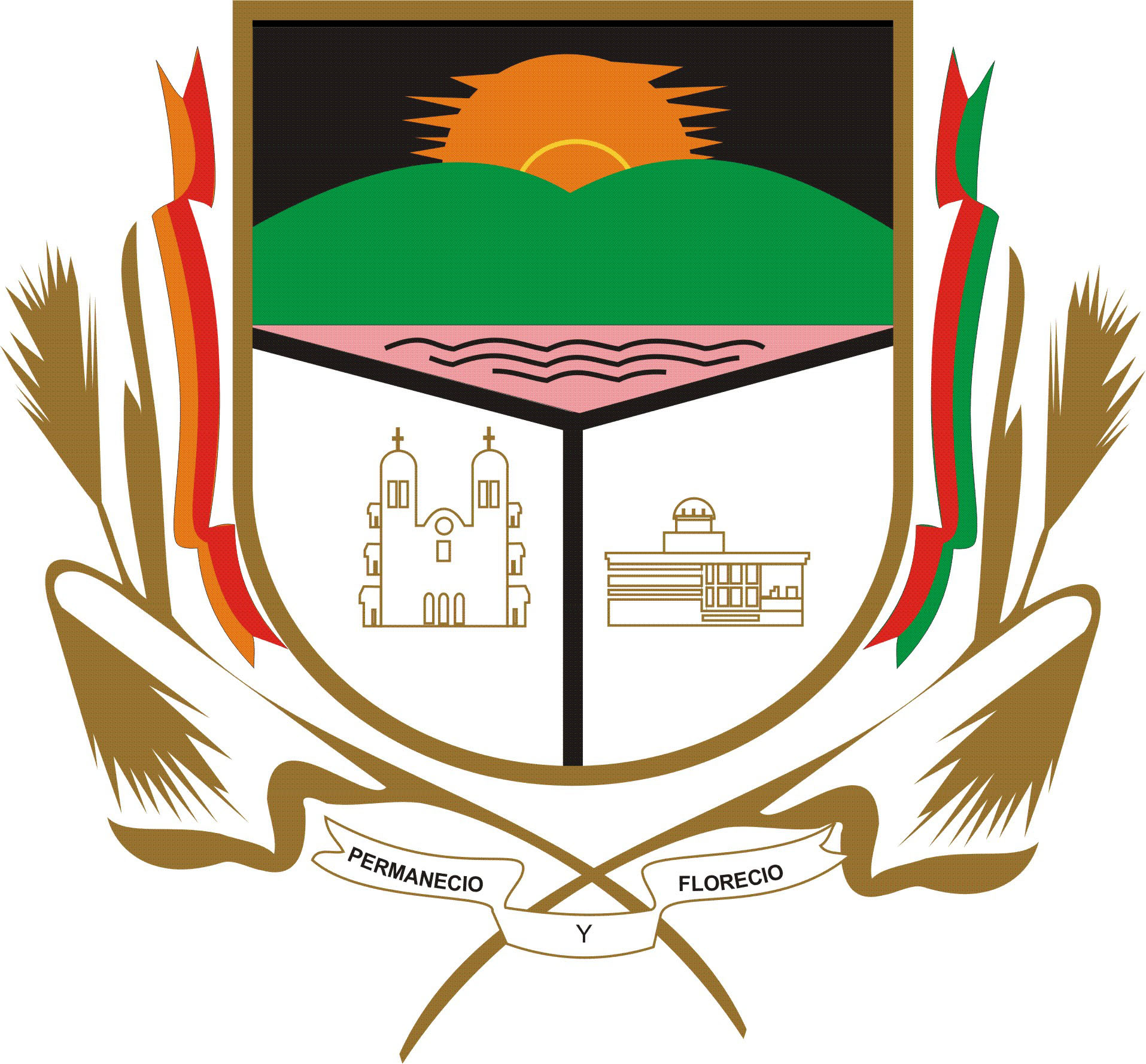
- Coat of arms

- Location within Uruguay
- Coordinates: 34°48′0″S 54°55′0″W
- Country: Uruguay
- Department: Maldonado
- Founded: 1763

Government
  - Mayor (Alcalde): Gregorio Quintana (Broad Front)

Area
  - Total: 9.98 km^{2} (3.85 sq mi)
- Elevation: 24 m (79 ft)

Population (2023 Census)
  - Total: 30,293
  - Density: 3,040/km^{2} (7,860/sq mi)
  - Demonym: carolino
- Time zone: UTC -3
- Postal code: 20400
- Dial plan: +598 42 (+6 digits)
- Climate: Cfa

San Carlos is a city in the Maldonado Department of southern Uruguay. "San Carlos" is also the name of the municipality to which the city belongs. The municipality includes the following zones: San Carlos, El Tesoro, La Barra, Edén Rock, El Chorro, Manantiales, Balneario Buenos Aires, Punta Piedras, Santa Mónica, San Vicente, El Edén, Paso de la Cantera, Las Cañas, Carapé, Mataojo, Guardia Vieja, Pago de la Paja, Partido Norte, Partido Oeste, Cañada Bellaca, Corte de la Leña, Punta del Campanera, Puntas de Mataojo, and Laguna José Ignacio.

== Geography ==
The city is located on Route 39, 2 kilometres (1.2 mi) south of its intersection with Route 9 and about 13.5 kilometres (8.4 mi) north of the center of the department capital city of Maldonado. The stream Arroyo San Carlos flows along the east limits of the city and the park and neighbourhood of Parque Medina is situated across it.

== History ==
It was founded on October 1763 by the Spanish Governor Pedro Antonio de Cevallos, to discourage the foundation of Portuguese settlements in the region. Its name is originated from that of the King of Spain at the time, Charles III.

It had acquired the status of "Villa" (town) before the Independence of Uruguay, which was elevated to "Ciudad" (city) on 18 December 1929 by the Act of Ley Nº 8.559.

== Population ==
In 2023, San Carlos had a population of 30,923. This makes it the second largest city in Maldonado Department after the capital city of Maldonado. According to the Intendencia Departamnetal de Maldonado, the municipality of San Carlos has a population of 27,000.

Location map of the municipality of San Carlos

Year	Population
1908	5,014
1963	13,695
1975	16,925
1985	19,877
1996	24,030
2004	24,771
2011	27,471
2023	30,293

Source: Instituto Nacional de Estadística de Uruguay

== Economy ==
It is considered to be the agropecuarian centre of the region.

== Places of worship ==
- Parish Church of St. Charles Borromeo (Roman Catholic)
- Parish Church of St. Pius X (Roman Catholic)
- San Carlos Ward LDS (Mormon)

== Notable people ==
- Luis Barrios Tassano, lawyer and politician
- Manuel Basilio Bustamante, interim President
- Cayetano Alberto Silva, musician
- Mariano Soler, first Archbishop of Montevideo
- Francisco Antonino Vidal, President
- Marta Albertini, actress
- Leonardo Olivera, military officer
- Matías Britos, footballer
- Darío Pérez Brito, physician and politician
- Óscar de los Santos, politician
- Ruperto Elichiribehety, navy officer

== See also ==
- Viceroyalty of the Río de la Plata
