= Cerro Pan de Azúcar Native Wildlife Breeding Station =

Zoo in Piriápolis, Uruguay

Coordinates: 34.815°S 55.251°W

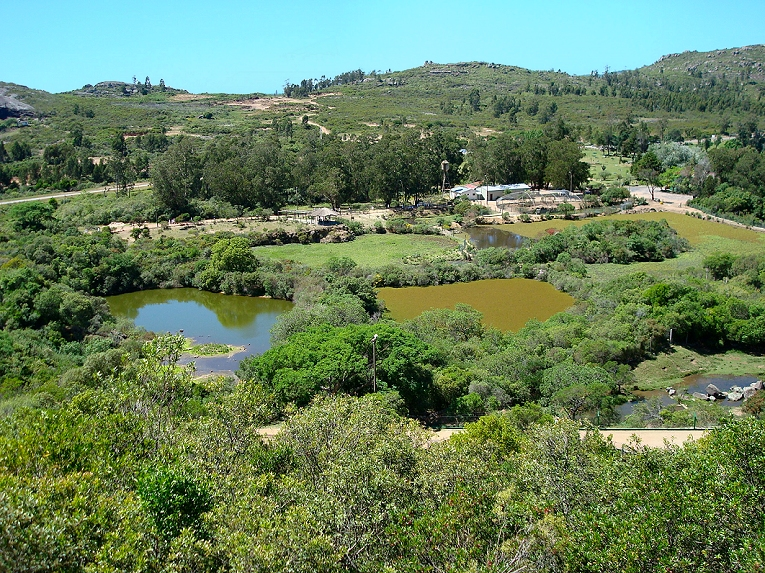
View of the park

Cerro Pan de Azúcar Native Wildlife Breeding Station is a zoo and nature reserve located close to the coastal city of Piriápolis in the Department of Maldonado, in Uruguay. Some 250 individuals of 53 species exclusively native to Uruguay are housed within an area of 86 hectares, surrounded by native vegetation. 300,000 people visit the park annually, many of which are groups of students. The park belongs to and is administered by the government of Maldonado.

== Location ==
Located in the municipality of Piriápolis, it sits on the hillside of Pan de Azúcar hill, with a peak 1277.9 ft (389.5 meters) above sea level, making it the third tallest hill in the country.

The entrance to the property is located 240 yards (220 meters) from a detour off National Route 37, and only 3.8 miles (6.1 km) from the beaches of Piriápolis. From Piriápolis, the park is accessed, starting from the la rambla de los Argentinos (street or avenue of the Argentines), along la avenida Artigas (Artigas Avenue), which continues onto Route 37. The detour is located 2.5 miles (4.0 kilometers) south of kilometer 86 along the Route. The City of Pan de Azúcar (Sugar bread) is also located there.

== History ==
The Nature Reserve was created in 1980, at the request of the mayor of Maldonado, Curutchet, and Uruguayan naturalist Tabaré Gonzélez Sierra. It was placed in a hillside of Pan de Azúcar, taking advantage of the fact that a century ago the founder of Piriápolis, Francisco Piria, had created an enormous rock quarry to supply the construction of his new city which by then had sat abandoned for many decades.
