= Argentino Hotel =

Hotel in Piriapolis, Uruguay

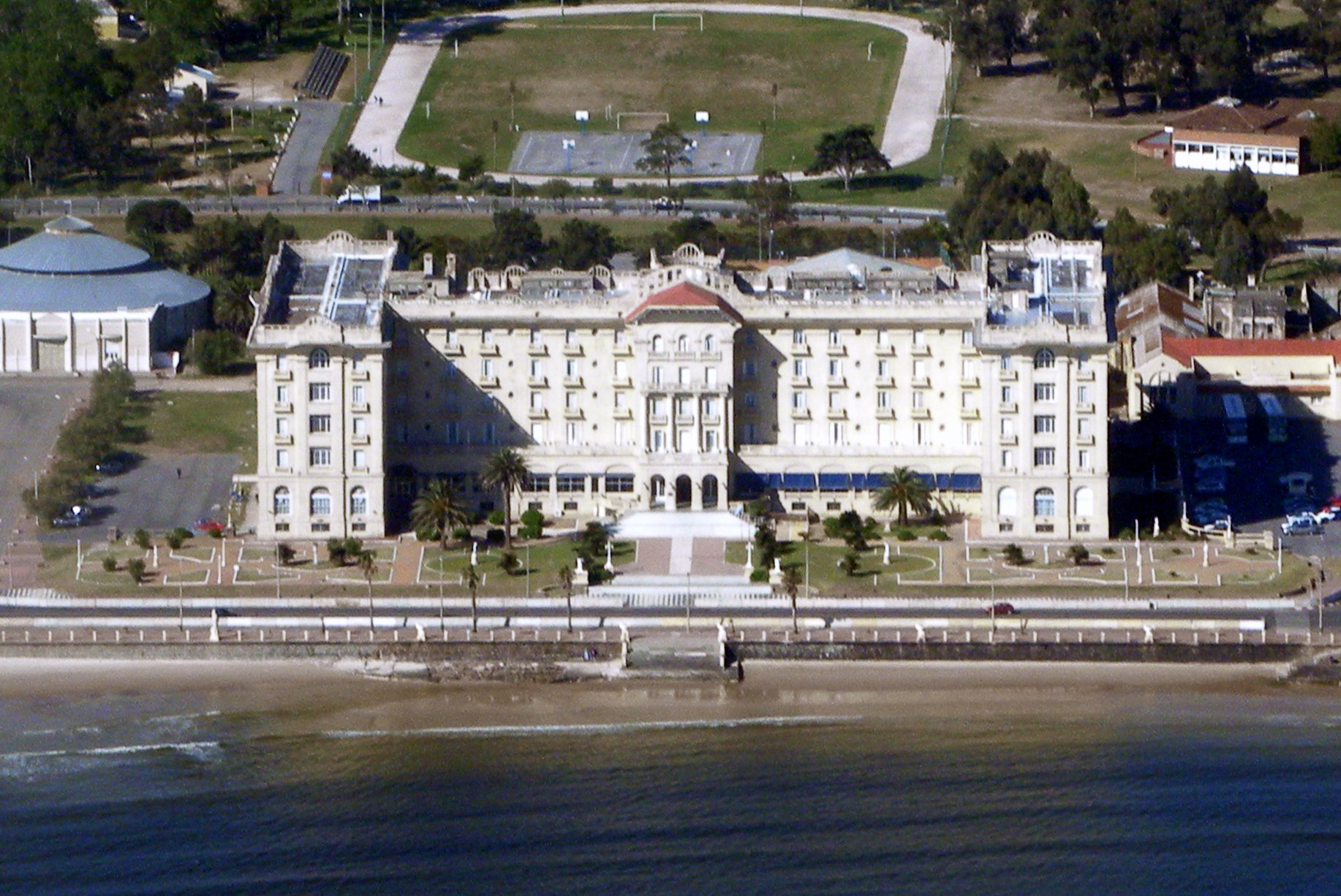
- Argentino Hotel in 2011.

- Location within Uruguay

General information
- Location: Rambla de los Argentinos s/n, Piriápolis, Maldonado, Uruguay
- Coordinates: 34.86347°S 55.27934°W
- Opening: 24 December 1930
- Owner: (Uruguay) Estado Uruguayo
- Management: Grupo Méndez Requena

Technical details
- Floor count: 6
- Lifts/elevators: 4

Design and construction
- Architect: Pierre Guichot
- Developer: Francisco Piria

Other information
- Number of rooms: 300
- Number of suites: 56

Website
- argentinohotel.com.uy

Argentino Hotel, the largest hotel complex in the city of Piriápolis, Uruguay.

== History ==
The project was the product of the vision of the businessman Francisco Piria, and he conceived it for 1.200 guests. In 1920 the Uruguayan president Baltasar Brum laid its cornerstone. It cost 5 million pesos, being at the time one of the most gigantic hotels in South America. This building has 120 meters in front, 70 deep and 6 floors. On the floor below, the first facilities for the use of thalassotherapy were already planned, with showers and bathtubs for hot and cold seawater baths, a Swedish gymnastics section, hairdressing salons, among others. For the furnishing, Piria brought linen from Italy, crockery from Germany, glassware from Czechoslovakia, and furniture from Austria. From the entrance you go to a staircase that invites you to go up to the rooms, with a stained glass window measuring five square meters and innumerable iridescent colors.

The architect of the hotel was Pierre Guichot.

It was inaugurated on 24 December 1930 and was for several years the largest hotel in South America. The hotel's casino is located on the left wing, the public can access via a staircase and guests through the left corridor on the ground floor.

The Argentino Hotel belongs to the Estado Uruguayo and is managed for concession by the Group Méndez Requena (Nifelar S.A.) 30 year, from 2017 to 2047.

The Argentino Hotel received the certification of accessibility to the physical environment, with respect to the UNIT 200 standard.

In 2021 it becomes a "pet friendly" hotel to admit small dogs that accompany their owners.

== Festival ==
The International Festival «Piriápolis de Película» is held at the hotel, which is an audiovisual exhibition for national and international filmmakers. It is characterized by exhibiting completely free of charge, a selection of film, short, medium and feature films, of all genres. It also has a Latin American short film contest and awards are given to outstanding actresses and actors.

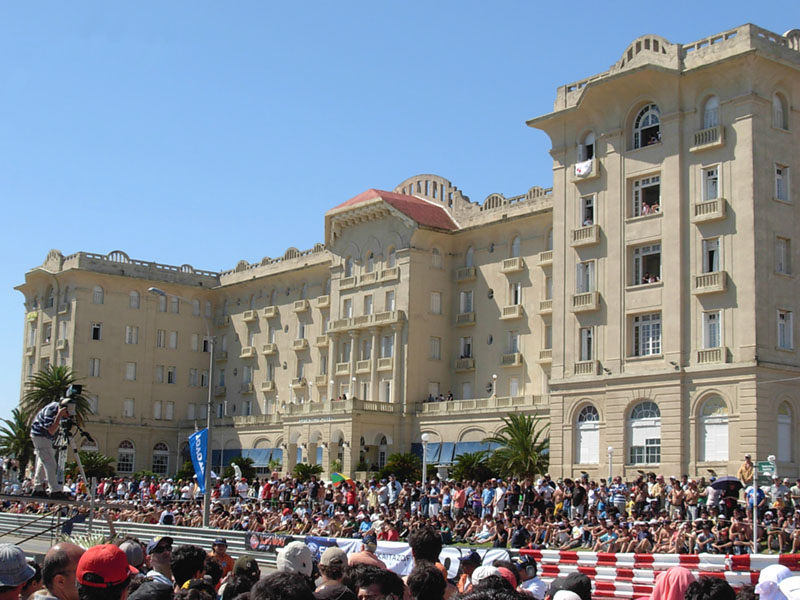
The Argentino Hotel, during the 2008 Piriápolis Grand Prix.

== Automobilism ==
In front of the hotel past the “Grand Prix of Piriápolis Automobilism”. Even the car race to match from the front in 2022.

== Fiction ==
Part of the Uruguayan film Whisky is going to shoot at the hotel facilities.

The action of the second part of the novel·la Assassinat a l'hotel de banys by Juan Grompone, runs through the hotel.

== Bibliography ==
- 1990, Por los Tiempos de Francisco Piria de Luis Martínez Cherro (ISBN 9789974102972).
- 2009, Piriápolis: una historia en 100 fotos de Pablo Reborido (ISBN 9789974105751).
- 2011, Argentino Hotel de Renée Pereira de Méndez Requena (ISBN 9789974985568).
- 2015, Las otras caras de Piria de Eduardo Cuitiño (ISBN 9789974499751).
