= Playa San Francisco =

Seaside resort in Maldonado Department, Uruguay

- Seaside resort
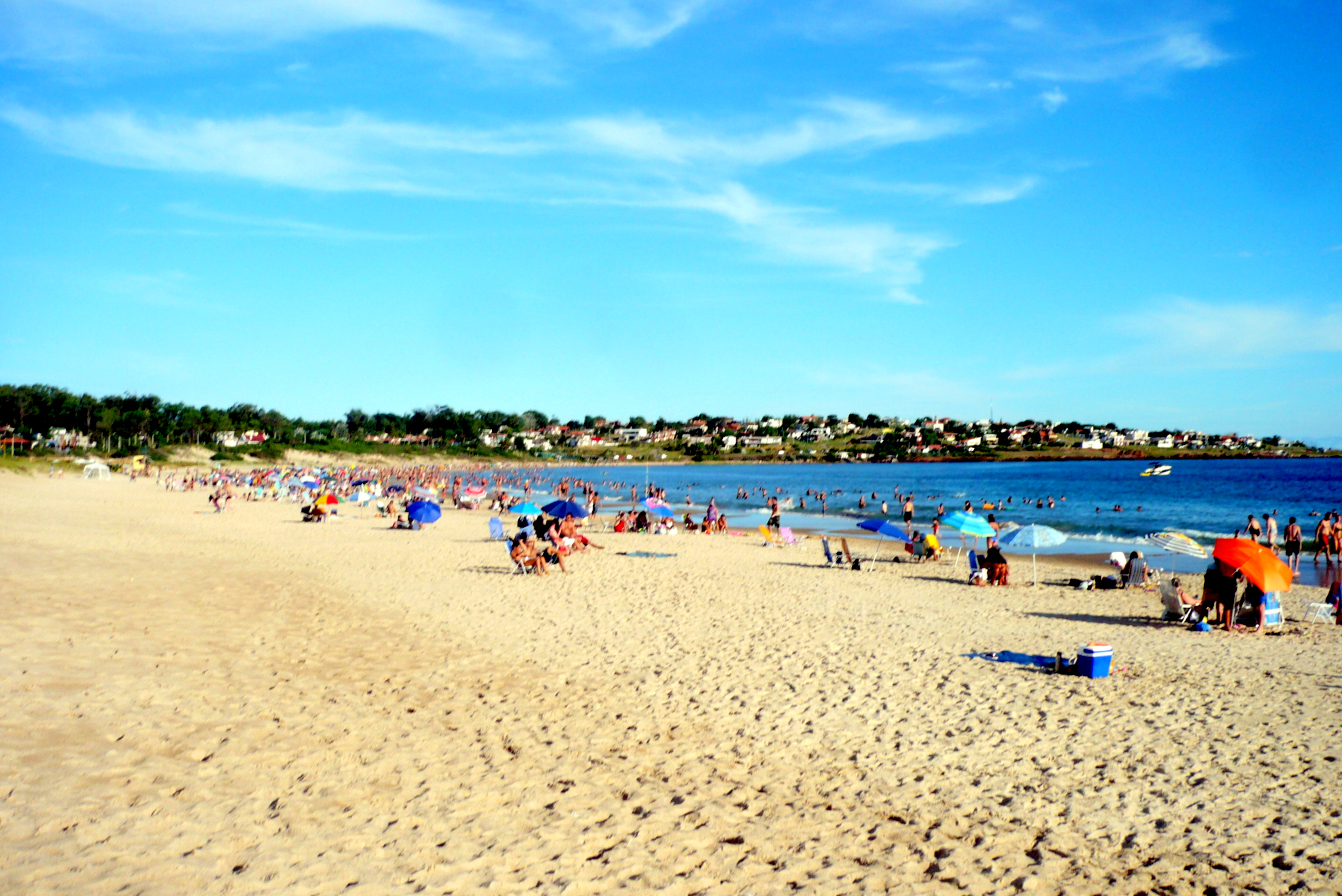

- Location in Uruguay
- Coordinates: 34°54′00″S 55°17′00″W
- Country: Uruguay
- Department: Maldonado Department
- Time zone: UTC -3
- Dial plan: +598 42 (+6 digits)

Playa San Francisco is a resort (balneario) in the Maldonado Department of Uruguay.

== Location ==
The resort is located on the coast of Río de la Plata, approximately 3.5 kilometres (2.2 mi) south of downtown Piriápolis.

It was named in honor of businessman Francisco Piria, the founder of Piriápolis.
