= Playa Hermosa, Uruguay =

Playa Hermosa
- Resort
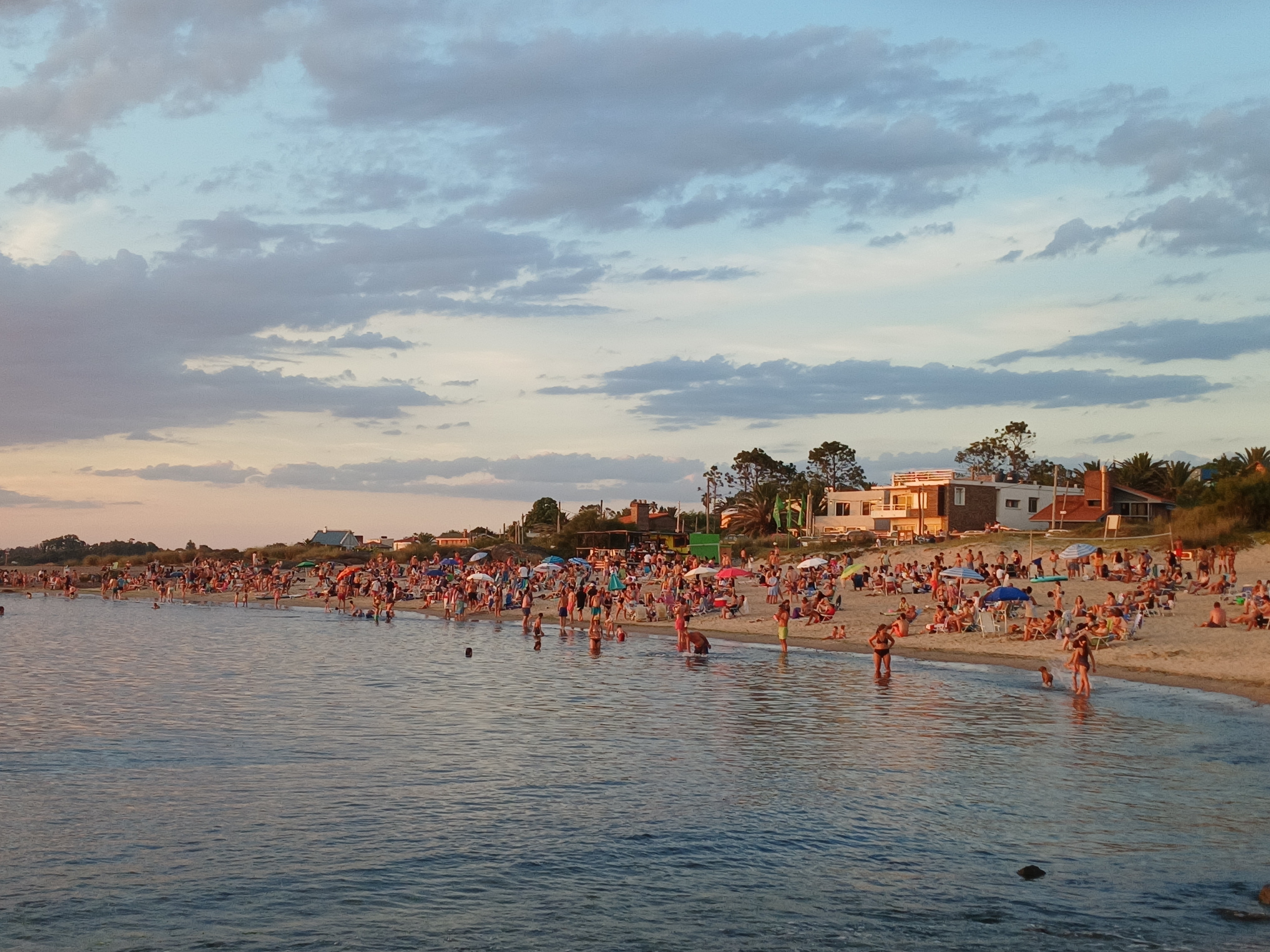

- Location in Uruguay
- Coordinates: 34°50′1″S 55°18′8″W
- Country: Uruguay
- Department: Maldonado Department

Population (2011)
  - Total: 611
- Time zone: UTC -3
- Postal code: 20303
- Dial plan: +598 443 (+5 digits)
- Climate: Cfa

Playa Hermosa is a resort town (balneario) in the Maldonado Department of southeastern Uruguay.

== Location ==
The resort is located on the coast of Río de la Plata, on Route 10, about 4.5 kilometres (2.8 mi) northwest of Piriápolis. It borders the resort Playa Verde to the northwest and the resort Playa Grande to the southeast.

== Population ==
In 2011 Playa Hermosa had a population of 611 permanent inhabitants and 1,413 dwellings.

Year	Population	Dwellings
1963	77	195
1975	121	368
1985	155	416
1996	302	762
2004	382	1,101
2011	611	1,413

Source: Instituto Nacional de Estadística de Uruguay
