= Manantiales =

Manantiales may refer to:

- Manantiales, Argentina, a village in Catamarca Province
- Manantiales, Uruguay, a resort in Maldonado department
