= Cerro San Antonio, Piriápolis =

Hill in Maldonado Department, Uruguay

Cerro San Antonio
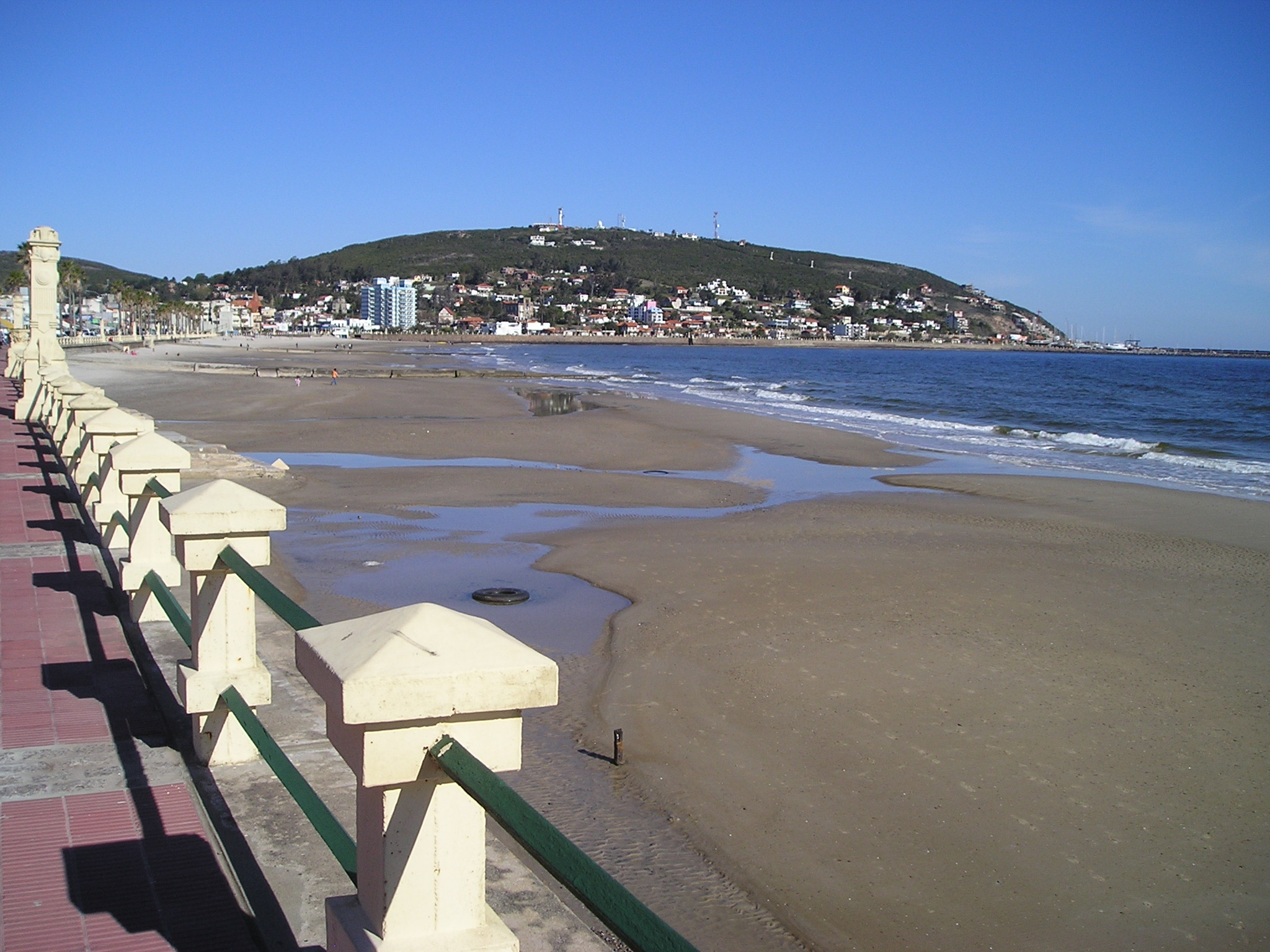
- Piriápolis with Cerro San Antonio, ca. 2003.

Highest point
- Elevation: 130 m (430 ft)
- Coordinates: 34°52′42″S 55°16′26″W

Naming
- English translation: Hill of Saint Anthony (of Padua)
- Language of name: Spanish

Geography
- Location within Uruguay
- Location: Piriápolis, Maldonado Department, Uruguay
- Parent range: Cuchilla Grande

Geology
- Mountain type: Hill

Climbing
- Easiest route: Automobile

Cerro San Antonio (also known as Cerro del Inglés) is a hill in Maldonado Department, Uruguay.

A landmark of Piriápolis, this hill overlooks the city, its beaches and ramblas, its harbor and nearby seaside resorts.

A chairlift leads to a small chapel on top, devoted to Saint Anthony of Padua, and a sculpture to Our Lady of the Fishermen, by Mirco Prati.
