= Pan de Azúcar, Uruguay =

Pan de Azúcar
- City Municipality
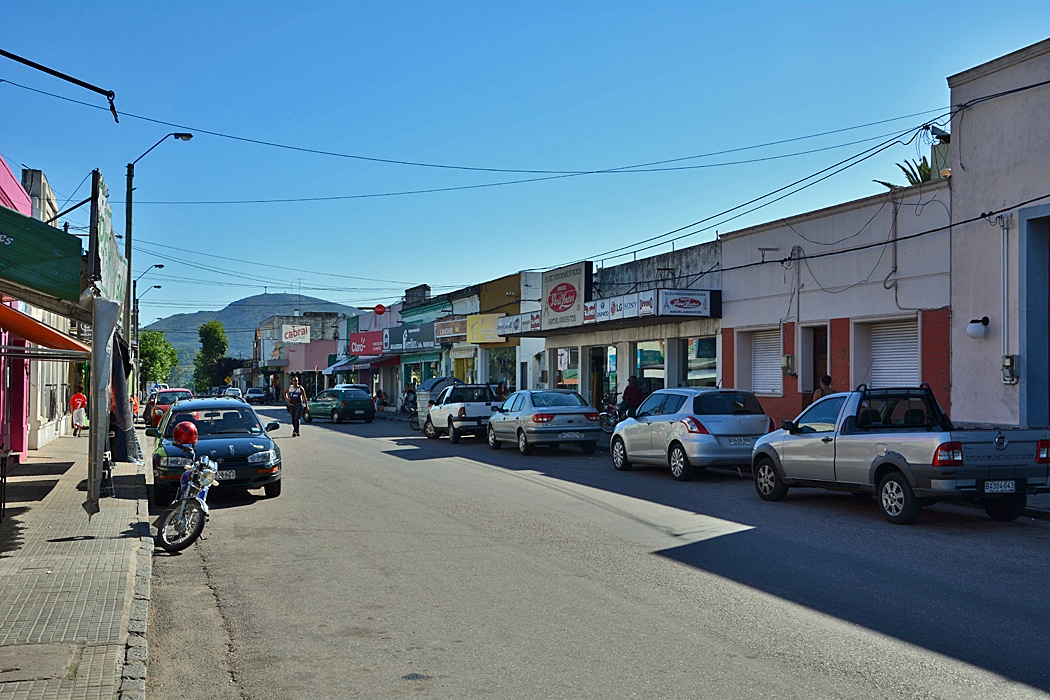
- Street view of Pan de Azúcar

- Location within Uruguay
- Coordinates: 34°48′0″S 55°13′0″W
- Country: Uruguay
- Department: Maldonado
- Founded: 1874
- Founded by: Félix de Lizarza
- Elevation: 79 m (259 ft)

Population (2011 Census)
  - Total: 6,597
- Time zone: UTC -3
- Postal code: 20300
- Dial plan: +598 443 (+5 digits)
- Climate: Cfa

Pan de Azúcar is a city in the southwest of the Maldonado Department in Uruguay. It takes its name from a nearby hill (Cerro Pan de Azúcar, actually located in the neighbouring municipality of Piriápolis), topped by a huge cross.

Pan de Azúcar is also the name of the municipality to which the city belongs. It includes the zones: Pan de Azúcar, Gerona, Kilómetro 110, Nueva Carrara, Puntas de Pan de Azúcar, Laguna del Sauce, Laguna de los Cisnes.

== Geography ==
The city is located at the junction of Route 9 with Route 60, 10 kilometres (6.2 mi) north-northeast of Piriápolis (via Route 37) and about 34 kilometres (21 mi) (via Routa IB) west-northwest from the capital city, Maldonado. The stream Arroyo Pan de Azúcar flows by the southwest limits of the city.

== History ==
It was founded in October 1874 by Félix de Lizarza. Lizarra counted with the help of inhabitants from the city of San Carlos.

Its status was elevated to "Pueblo" (village) by Decree of 20 April 1887, and on 7 September 1961, it was further elevated to "Ciudad" (city) by the Act of Ley N° 12.908.

== Population ==
In 2011, Pan de Azúcar had a population of 6,597. According to the Intendencia Departamnetal de Maldonado, the municipality of Pan de Azúcar has a population of 9,500.

Location map of the municipality of Pan de Azúcar

Year	Population
1908	3,409
1963	4,190
1975	5,125
1985	5,513
1996	6,532
2004	7,098
2011	6,597

Source: National Statistics Institute

== Places of worship ==
- Parish Church of Our Lady of Sorrows (Roman Catholic)

== See also ==
- Maldonado Department
