= Museum of the Sea (Uruguay) =

Museum in La Barra, Uruguay

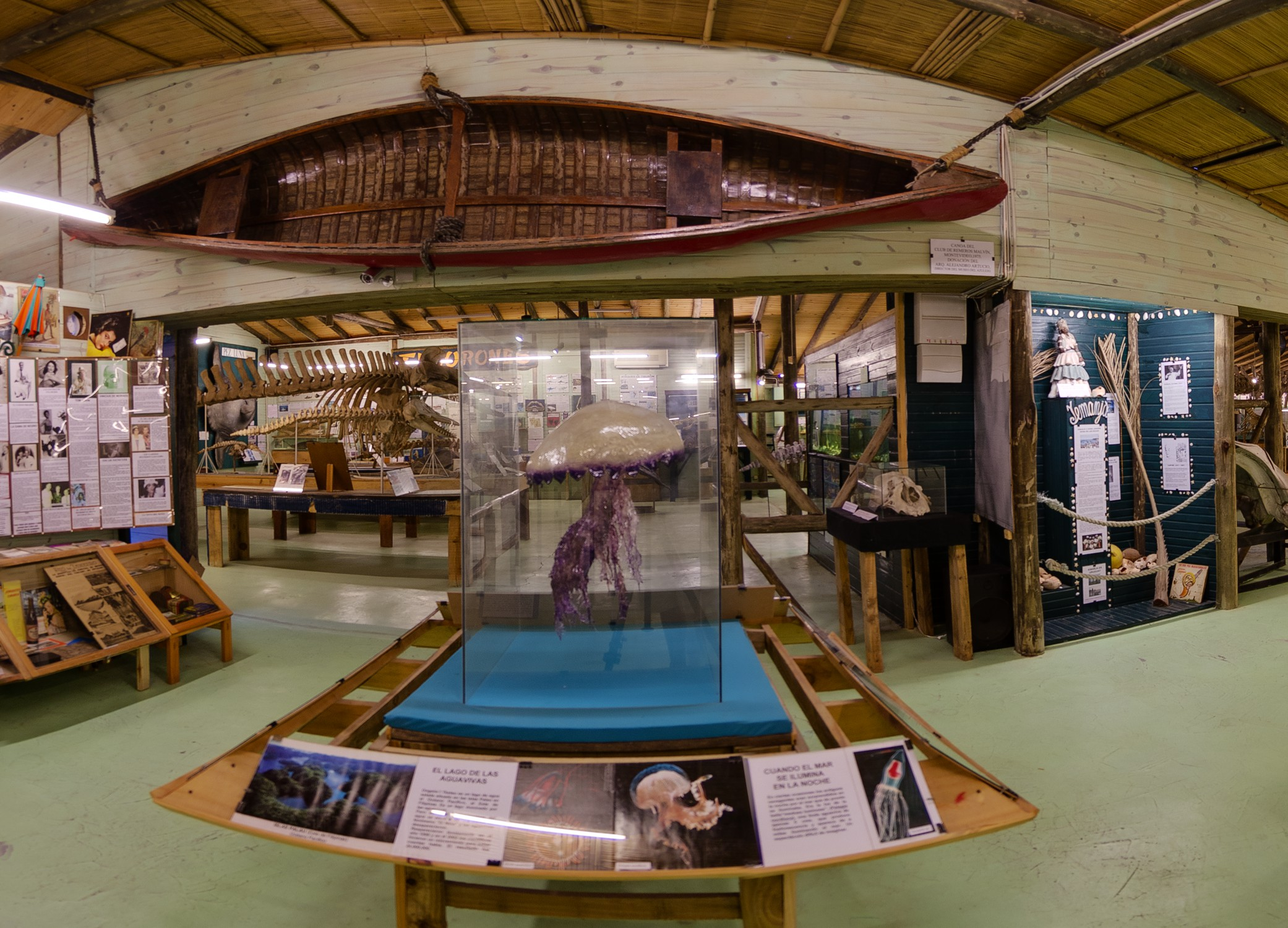
- Established: January 15, 1996; 30 years ago
- Location: Romildo Risso esq. Pedro Aicardi, El Tesoro, Uruguay
- Coordinates: 34°53′56″S 54°52′13″W
- Director: Pablo Etchegaray
- Website: Museum of the Sea

The Museum of the Sea (Spanish: Museo del Mar), opened in 1996, is a museum of natural history located in La Barra, in the department of Maldonado, Uruguay. It occupies about 2,300 m^{2} (25,000 sq ft) and is divided into four large halls, which are open to the public all year round.

== Overview ==
The museum contains over 5,000 specimens of marine fauna. Among these specimens are whale skeletons, sea urchins, starfish and turtle shells. In addition, there are old photographs and an old bathing machine used by women in the early 20th century, as well as telescopes and blunderbusses of the period. There is also an exhibit about the most famous pirates.

== Exhibit halls ==
The Museum of the Sea is composed of four museums in one. In the Museum of the Sea, everything is related to marine life: whale skeletons, seashells, a deep sea room, interactive exhibits, an area where children can draw their own pictures, a section devoted to pirates and another to treasure. The Beach Resort Museum shows the history of holiday resorts, some of which are now city neighbourhoods, such as Pocitos and Carrasco, while others are tourist destinations, such as Punta del Este, La Paloma, Piriápolis, Atlántida, Mar del Plata and Copacabana. The Nostalgia Museum holds collections of vintage objects such as jars, tins, radio sets, medical remedies, photographs, and beach-related items such as beach umbrellas and pails that were used decades ago. Three collections and 38,000 specimens of insects are exhibited in the Insectarium. Most of the specimens are beetles, but there are also moths, cicadas, and grasshoppers, among other species.

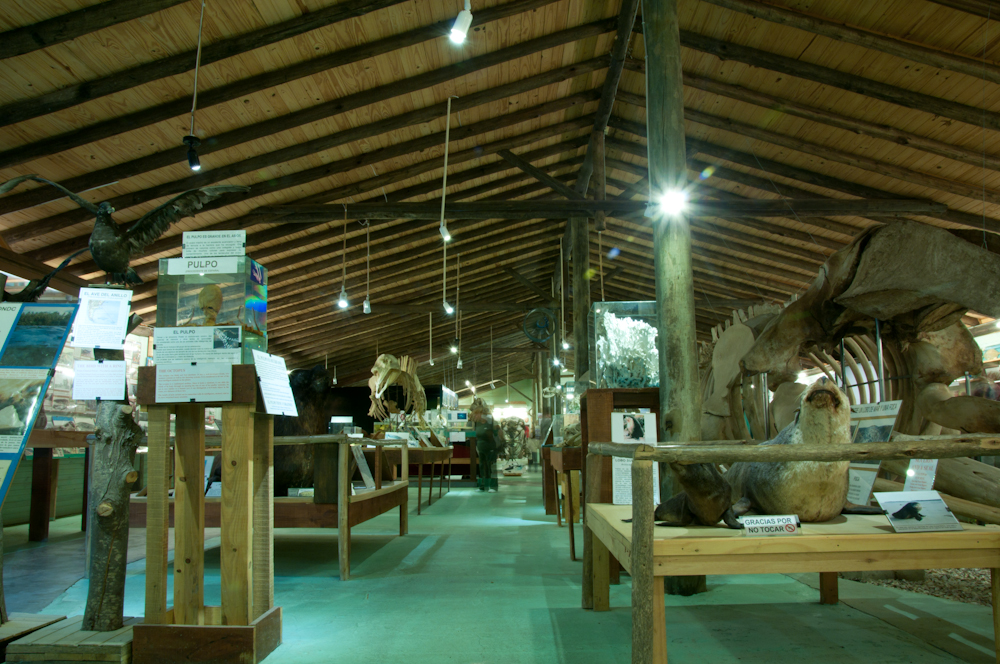
Museum entry.

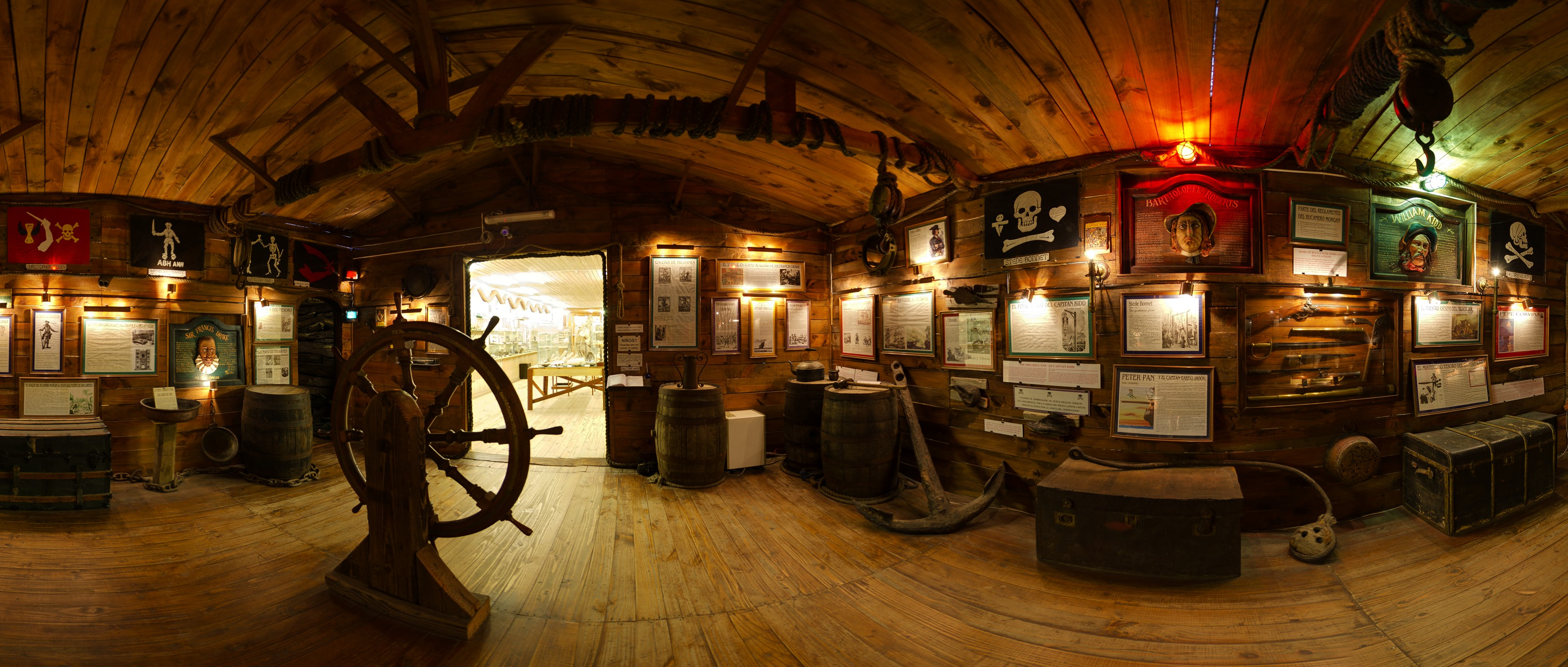
Pirates at museum.

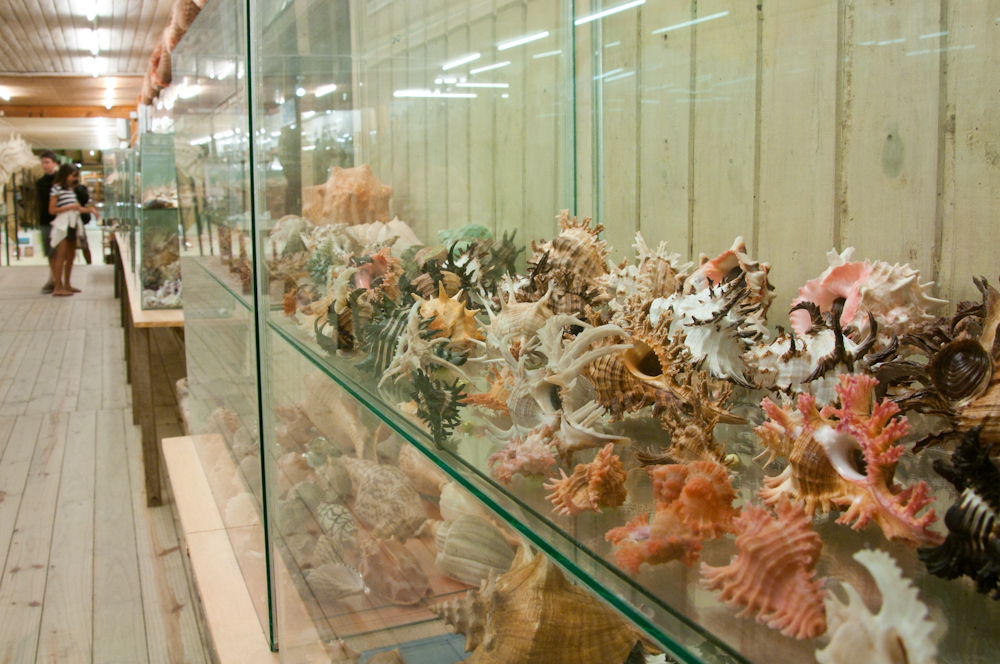
Seashells at the museum of the sea.

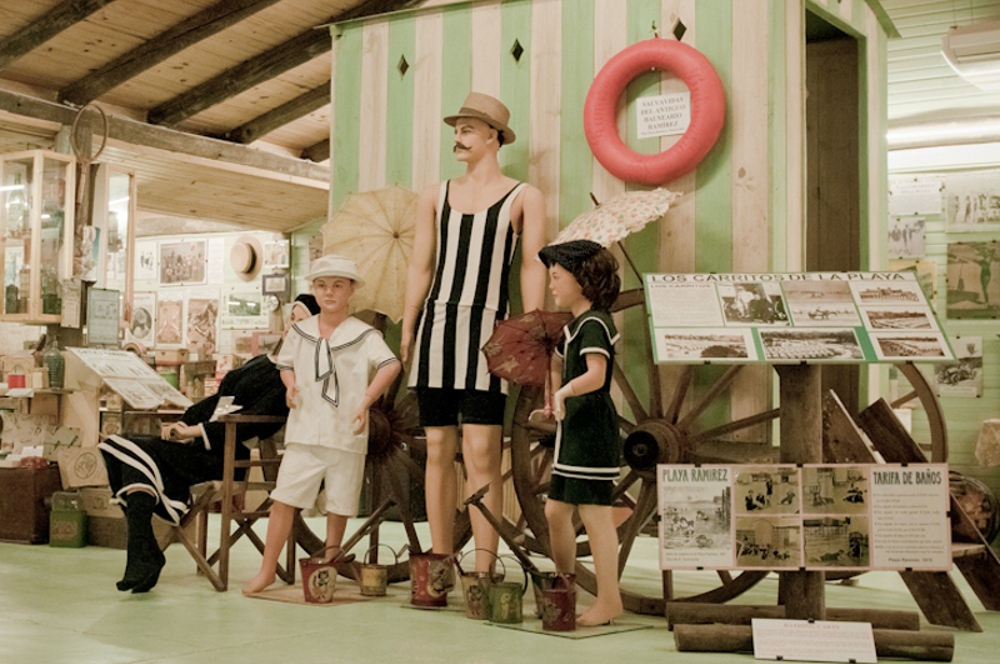
Bathers of the past.

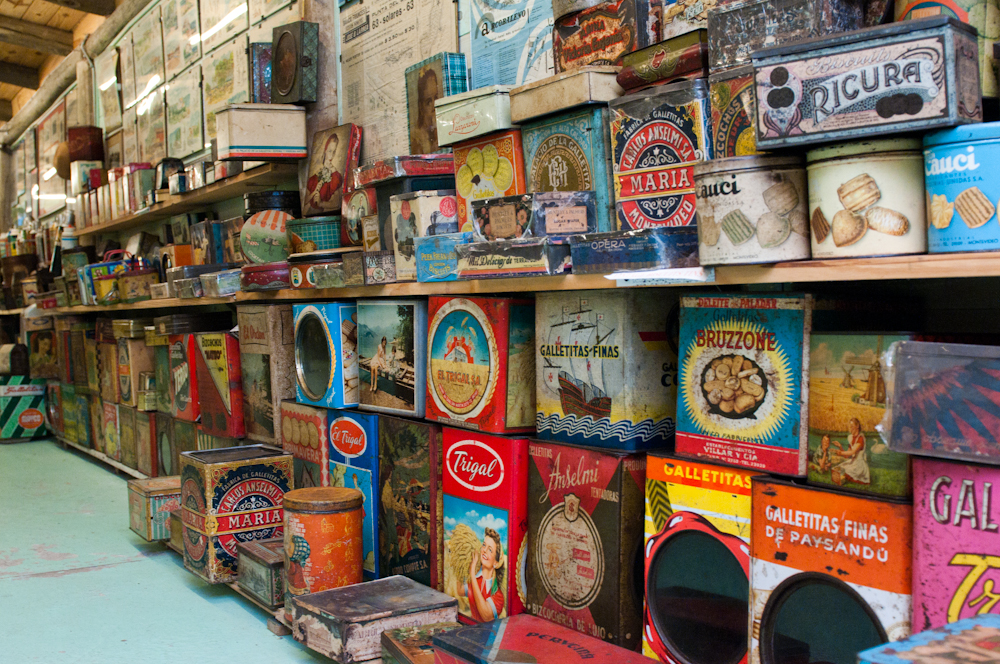
Museum collectibles.

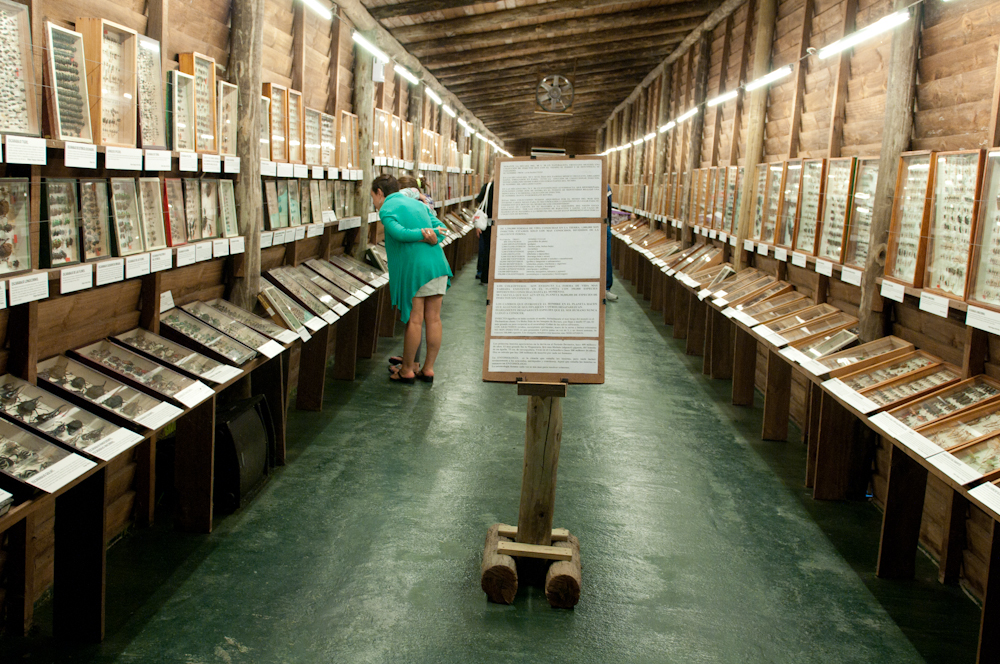
Insectarium.
