= Barrio Los Aromos =

- Suburb of Maldonado
- Location in Uruguay
- Coordinates: 34°52′58″S 54°59′8″W
- Country: Uruguay
- Department: Maldonado Department

Population (2011)
  - Total: 956
- Time zone: UTC -3
- Postal code: 20000
- Dial plan: +598 42 (+6 digits)
- Climate: Cfb

Barrio Los Aromos is a suburb of Maldonado, Uruguay.

== Geography ==
Barrio Los Aromo borders the suburbs Cerro Pelado to the east and Villa Delia to the south, and to the west with the Municipal Cemetery and the park Chacra Brunett.

== Population ==
In 2011 Barrio Los Aromos had a population of 956.

Year	Population
1963	55
1975	113
1985	145
1996	427
2004	633
2011	956

Source: Instituto Nacional de Estadística de Uruguay
