= Eduardo Cuitiño =

Eduardo Cuitiño Bosio
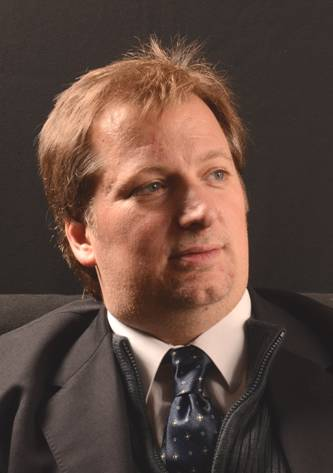
- Born: January 28, 1974; Montevideo, Uruguay
- Education: ORT Uruguay
- Occupations: Writer, mathematician
- Writing career
- Language: Spanish

Eduardo Cuitiño Bosio (born January 28, 1974, in Montevideo) is a Uruguayan writer/author and mathematician known for his investigations and essays on two historic figures: Carlos Gardel and Jack the Ripper.

== Career ==
Graduated from the Science Faculty of the Republic University (UDELAR, Montevideo) in 2001 with a degree on Math with Statistic option, and since then he works as a teacher at the ORT University in Uruguay and works as statistician.

His interest as an investigator relies in connecting history with math and statistics.

== Carlos Gardel birthplace dispute ==
He became known in a reportage of the 'Diario el País de Montevideo' on June 24, 2012, where he exposed that from his calculations Carlos Gardel could not be born in 1890 nor in 1883 or 1884 as it was debated in the moment, but in the early months of 1887.

In May 2012, under the editorial house 'Fin de Siglo', Eduardo Cuitiño published "Gardel el muerto que habla" (Gardel, the dead that speaks) (book that was presented by engineer Juan Grompone along with the author Susana Cabrera ), and were the mentioned Uruguayan author plays with Gardel's favorite number for his gamble, 48, that would be the age that according to him Gardel would have by the time of his death.

In his essay, the mentioned author bases how the particular biology of Carlos Gardel is explained as the result of an incestuous relation between Carlos Escayola and María Leila Oliva, pointing that the presidio of the singer in Ushuaia jail and the falsity of a supposed holographic test. Besides, it is based the existence of another child, truly French and documented, with whom Carlos Gardel was associated to gain his author and image rights, in base of a 1904 document.

Gardel in 1904 was detained in a commissariat in Florencio Varela, and according to the statements in the records, he had a height of 160 centimeters. To reconcile biologically that height with the supposed French boy, the true height should have been 140 centimeters.

Eduardo Cuitiño was interviewed by different press media to that regard, and his thesis on the origin of Carlos Gardel received a strong accolade by taking officially by the Mayor's Office of Tacuarembó Gardel's year of birth 1887, respecting what Gardel in life left in all his documents: Uruguayan, born in Tacuarembó in 1887.

Despite the height analysis by Cuitiño, scholars around the world generally accept that Gardel was born in 1890 in Toulouse, France, based on a verified contemporary birth certificate signed by his mother, rather than the second one that Gardel ordered to be made in Buenos Aires in 1920 when he was 29 years old. The Toulouse birth certificate was verified by a research team in 2012. Scholars such as Vanderbilt University history professor Simon Collier, University of Belgrano agriculture history professor Osvaldo Barsky and Uruguayan history professor Jorge Ruffinelli from Stanford University write about the birthplace dispute and how Gardel must have been born in France. It is accepted that Gardel was raised in Buenos Aires from an early age, and that he falsified his birthplace documents in 1920 to avoid problems with the French military, because he was a French citizen by birth but he failed to register for World War I as required. Gardel probably chose Uruguay as a false birthplace because Uruguay was neutral during the war. Scholars generally agree that Gardel never lived in Uruguay.

== Jack the Ripper ==
Currently, Eduardo Cuitiño is concentrated in a new essay on the true identity of Jack the Ripper, on who he has already published a novel "Viajando en el tiempo para atrapar a Jack el Destripador" (Traveling in time to catch Jack the Ripper). Again, according to his calculations, the mythic Jack the Ripper would be no other that Stephen Herbert Appleford, who surely did not acted alone.

With his investigation, Eduardo Cuitiño, adds to the short list of authors that in Latin America have seriously addressed the issue of "Jack the Ripper", this way he sums his name to those of the Nicaraguan Arquímides González and his compatriot Gabriel Pombo.

== Publications ==
- Eduardo Cuitiño, Gardel: El muerto que habla (Gardel, the dead that speaks), edited by 'Fin de Siglo', July 22, 2013.
- Eduardo Cuitiño, "Viajando en el tiempo para atrapar a Jack el Destripador" (Traveling in time to catch Jack the Ripper), digital site 'SlideShare', October 2, 2013.
- Eduardo Cuitiño, Anecdotario de Carlos Gardel (Carlos Gardel's Anecdotes).
- Eduardo Cuitiño, El misterio del tesoro de las Masilotti (The mystery of the Masilotti's treasure), edited by 'Fin de Siglo', October, 2014.
- Eduardo Cuitiño, Estancia la Aurora el enigma, edited by 'Fin de Siglo', October, 2016.
- Eduardo Cuitiño, Misterios del mar, edited by 'Fin de Siglo', October, 2018.
- Eduardo Cuitiño, Las otras caras de Piria, edited by 'Fin de Siglo', October, 2019.
- Eduardo Cuitiño, El verdadero Pittamiglio, edited by 'Fin de Siglo', October, 2020.
- Eduardo Cuitiño, El código Pittamiglio, edited by 'Fin de Siglo', June, 2022.
- Eduardo Cuitiño, Humberto Pittamiglio, el político de la calle Ejido, edited by 'Fin de Siglo', September, 2023.

== Interviews ==
- Lights in the shadow: New study on the identity of Jack the Ripper, interview to Eduardo Cuitiño held in November 2012 by Jordi Fortiá, of 'ABC Puntio Radio de España', Spain.
- Note of Francisco Javier Lama (EFE – Subrayado) to Eduardo Cuitiño, author of Gardel, the dead that speaks: "Mathematical theory that Gardel is Uruguayan, DNA is asked (a university teacher in Montevideo, expert in probability and math, made calculations and concludes that Gardel is Uruguayan", June 1, 2013.
- Interview in Channel 10 to Eduardo Cuitiño, June 24, 2013.
- Interview by Mauricio Almada to Eduardo Cuitiño in "810 VIVO Avances, Tendencias y Actualidad (810 LIFE Advances, Tendencies and Actuality), 'radio El Espectador', July 8, 2013 (interview video).
- Interview of October 2, 2013 in the programme "Buen día Uruguay" (Good Morning Uruguay) (Channel 4, Montevideo, 9:30 am) conducted by Christian Font and Federixo Paz, interviewed: Gonzalo Vázquez Gabor and Eduardo Cuitiño Bosio, comment: The graduates Gonzálo Vázquez Gabor and Eduardo Cuitiño presented in the Uruguayan TV the facsimile of the first document of Carlos Gardel, of 1920. The document was given by the Argentineans Walter Santoro, president of the Argentinean Cultural Industries Foundation (FICA), and the "gardelian" investigator Martina Iñiguez. In the referred identity document it clearly states: Uruguayan born in Tacuarembó.
- Video (without audio) taken in the frame of the presentation of the book "Gardel the dead that speaks" in Rivera (Uruguay), on June 26, 2013.

== Articles in written press ==
- Uruguay holds to Gardel 78 years after his dead: Recently tow books have been published that insist on his Oriental origin and the government carries out actions tending to potentiate tango, article of "El Observador" (Uruguay) June 24, 2013.

== Conferences and other videos ==
- Catching Jack the Ripper with a 99% probability, conference of September 24, 2013, at the "Students Day of ORT-Uruguay University".

== Image gallery – Montevideo ==
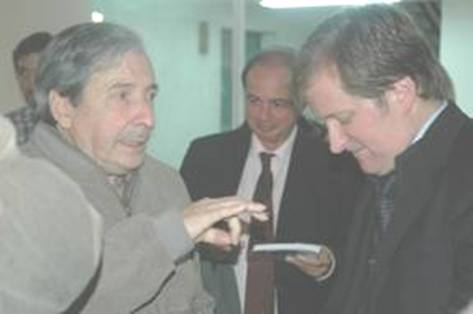
Image 1

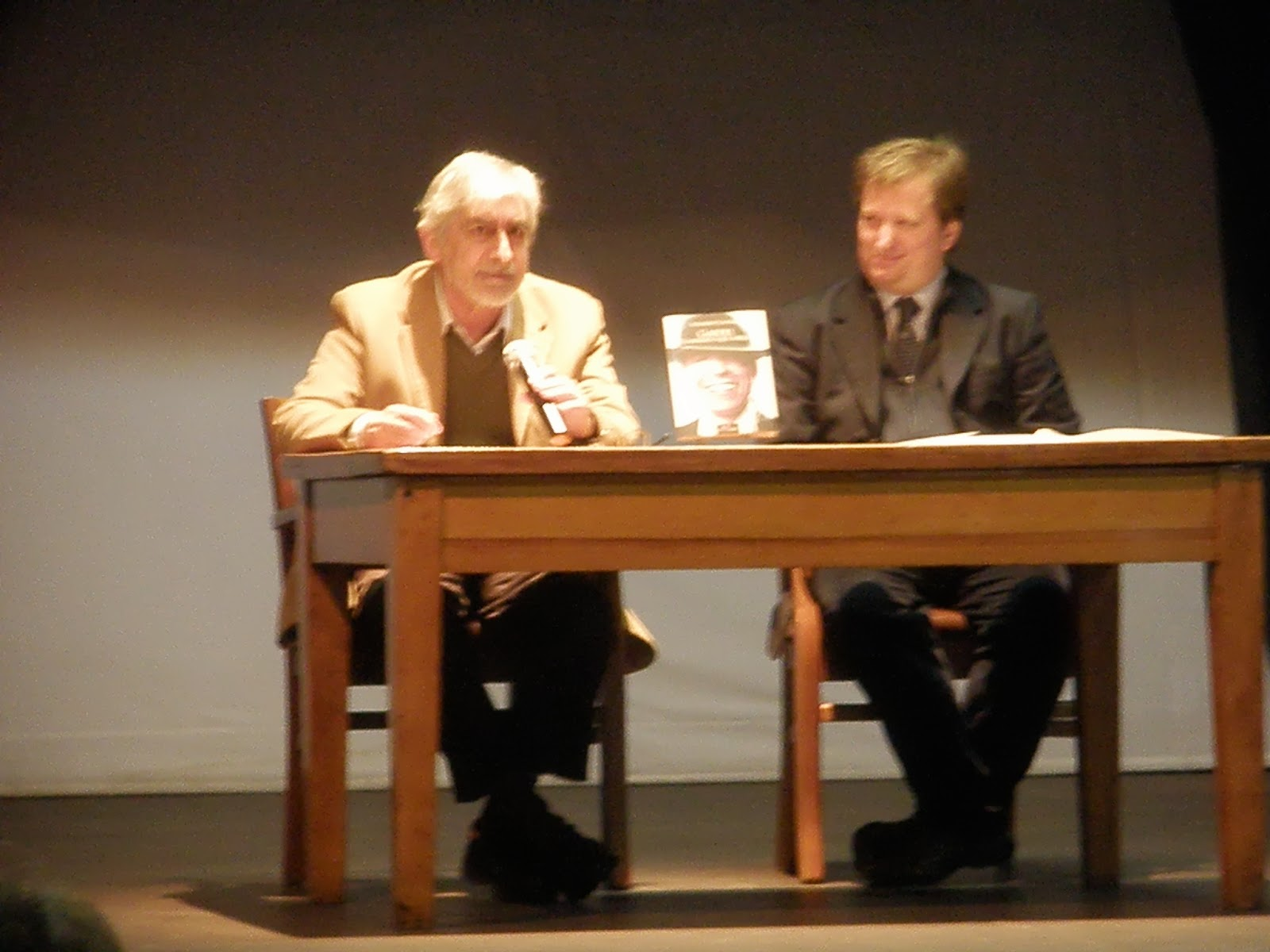
Image 2
- Image 1 : Boris Puga (left) with Eduardo Cuitiño (right), on Tuesday May 28, 2013, in opportunity of the presentation of Cuitiño's book "Gardel the dead that speaks".
- Image 2 : Eduardo Cuitiño (right) with Juan Grompone (left) during the presentation of Cuitiño's book on May 28, 2013.

== Image gallery – Rivera ==
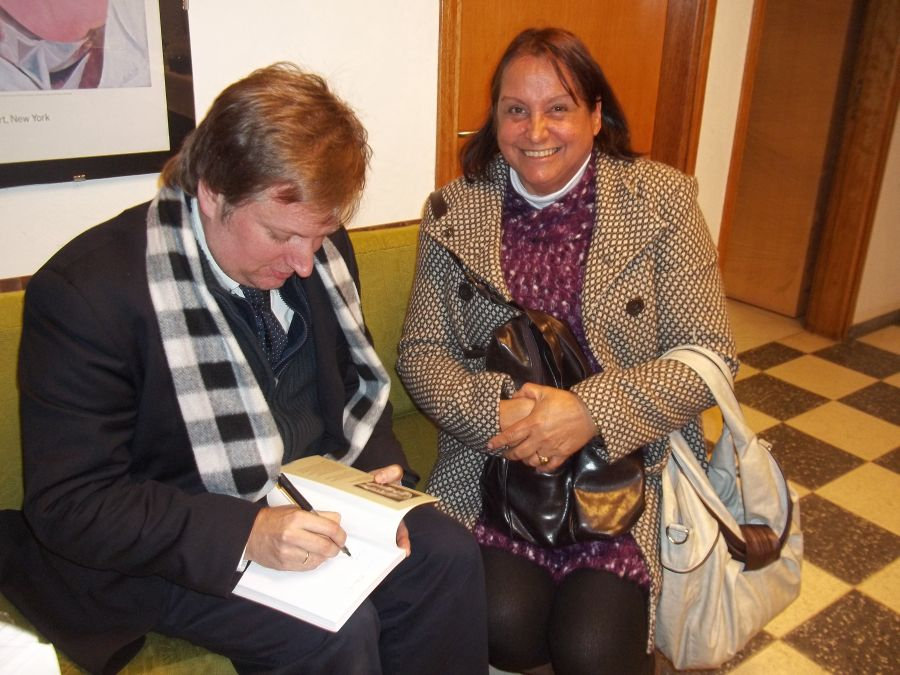
Image 11

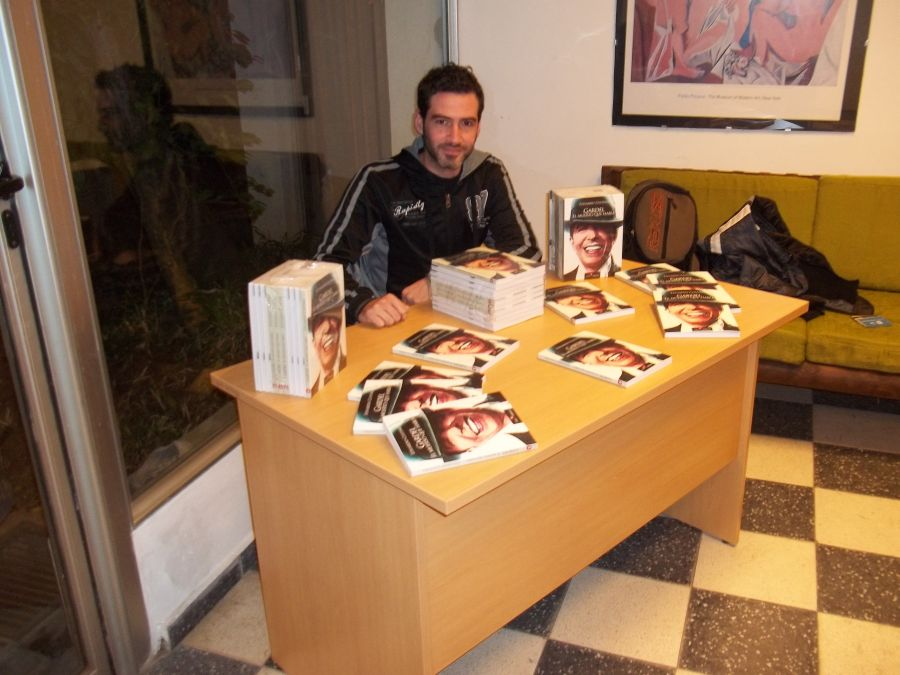
Image 12

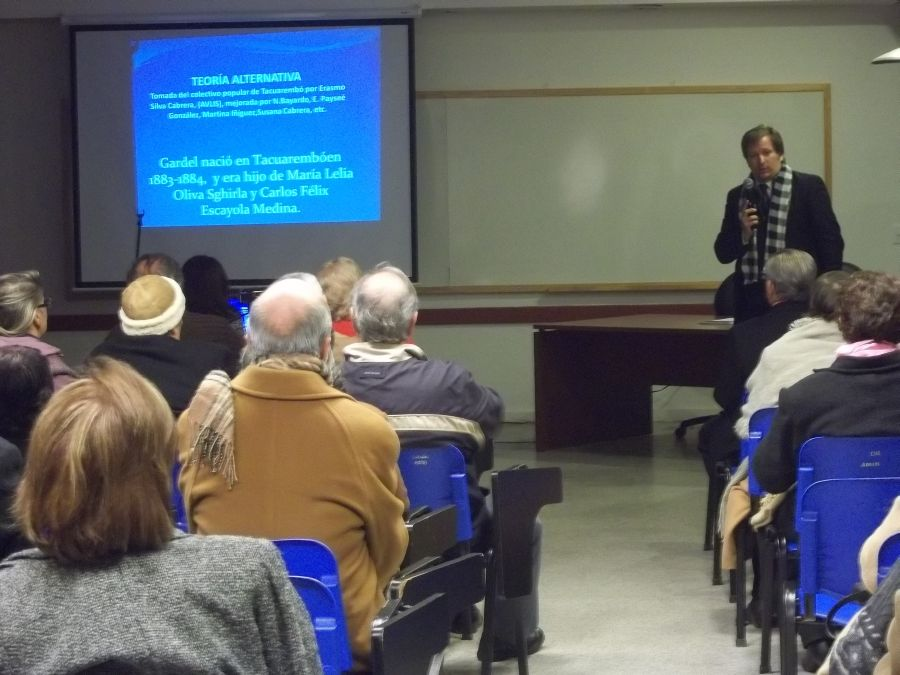
Image 13

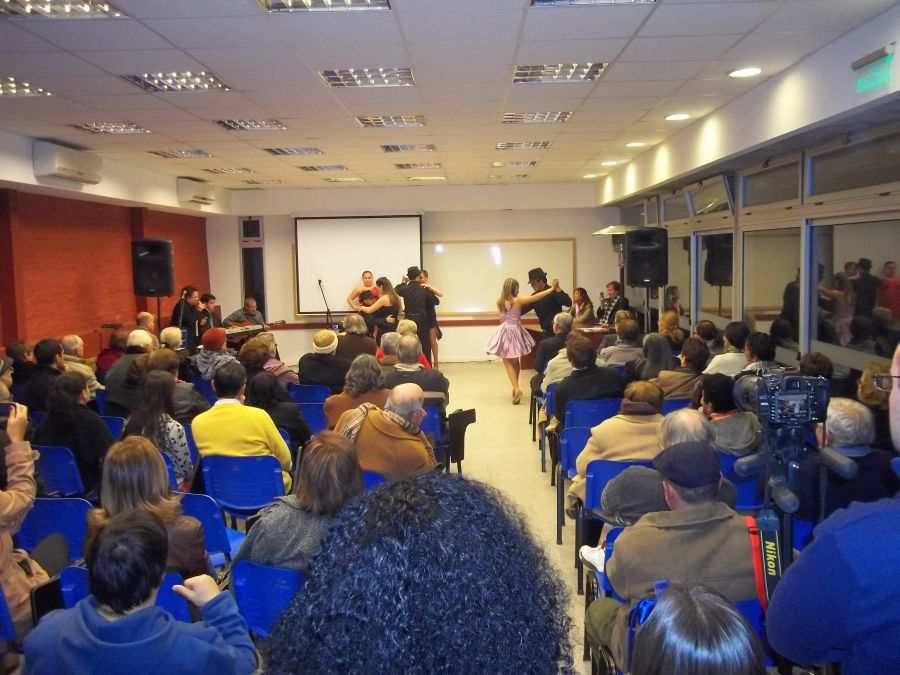
Image 14

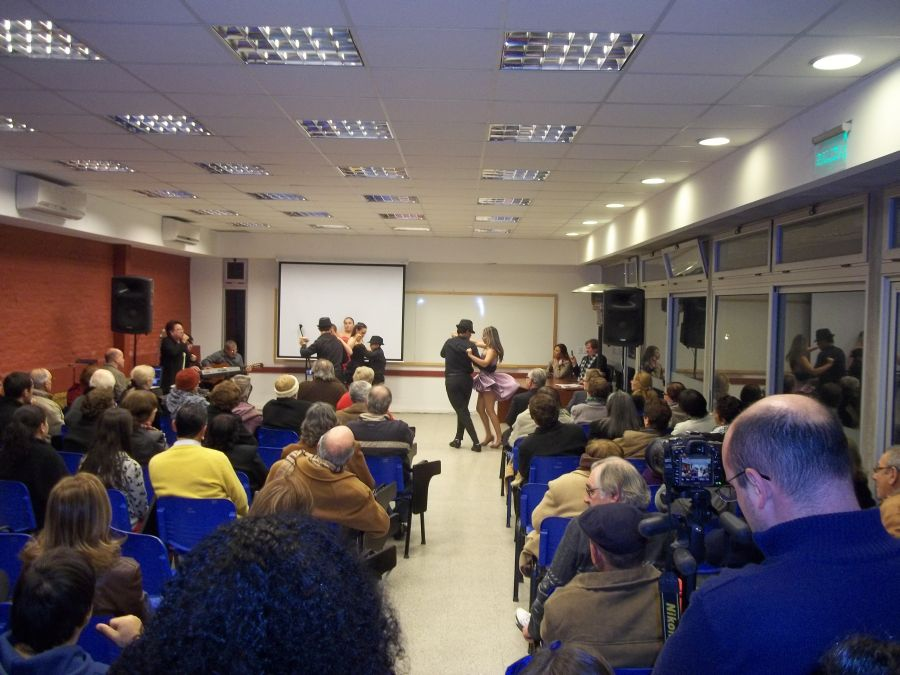
Image 15
- Image 11 and following: Eduardo Cuitiño in the University Center of Rivera, June 26, 2013, in opportunity of the presentation of the book "Gardel, the dead that speaks".

== See also ==
- Jack the Ripper
- Carlos Gardel
