= ESTE ARTE =

International art fair

ESTE ARTE is an international art fair held annually every January in Punta del Este, Uruguay. It presents international art galleries, which showcase both established and newly emerging artists. In addition to the artworks shown by participating galleries, the fair offers parallel programming including seminars by experts open to the public, debates hosted by different artists, shows featuring sound art and scheduled guided visits. ESTE ARTE brings an artistic offering that ranges from historical avant-gardes to emerging and contemporary art. While ESTE ARTE provides the platform for galleries to show and sell their work to collectors, museum directors, and curators, it also attracts a large international audience of art spectators and students.

It was established in 2015 by Uruguayan curator Laura Bardier and despite its recent history it has become an important cultural event in the country, acting as a catalyser for other cultural activities. Galleries who apply to ESTE ARTE present a proposal of the display planned for the occasion. Each application is considered for participation by a Selection Committee of national curators, following standards established by ESTE ARTE based on what is presented for the booth and the general programme of the gallery. The Committee aims to focus on searching for galleries and projects that start new tendencies in the art system. It is Uruguay's first and only art fair of its kind.

The fair runs for four days and brings together galleries from more than 20 countries at the Punta del Este Exhibition Center, Uruguay’s largest and newly constructed in 2017. The fair is open to the public and its third and latest edition attracted about 6,000 visitors, an increase from the initial 2,500 that attended its first edition.

== Background ==
ESTE ARTE was Laura Bardier’s response to the necessity from artists and collectors for a healthier, stronger and durable art system in Uruguay and the region.

The project’s objective is to collaborate to Uruguay’s cultural development, by aiming to be a reference for Contemporary Art in the region. Bardier’s vision is to position the fair at an international level as a platform for discussion and construction of content that is referent both to the Uruguay and Latin America.

Even though most of the galleries are international, almost 70 represented artists (about 65%) are Uruguayan.

== Concept ==
Uruguay’s art market is on process of development. It was seen as necessary to offer regional artists the opportunity for work offers and stronger professional development. There was also the perceived wish from collectors and patrons to support high quality art projects. In this way, the fair is a gear in an art system that needs gallerists, artists, curators, museums, institutions and collectors.

The fair has an objective to present a balanced amount of international and regional galleries, both emerging and those with great trajectories. There is a mix in the space of young, emerging artists with more consecrated ones, so that collectors can recognise works from other international exhibits but also discover new talent. According to Laura Bardier this allows for the project to “have a human scale focusing on quality, international but with local roots, and specially different because of its location.” Its infrastructure is compliant with international standards of light, walls, services, security and cleanliness.

The artists and works exhibited are varied, displaying mainly Contemporary but also Modern Art, which is particular to Uruguay and the region. For example, Coline Milliard, co-director of Carroll/Fletcher in London, explained that “it seemed appropriate to display works with European geometry, that is in affinity with the geometric abstraction of Latin America.”

The fair’s concept revolves around promoting dialogue between the visitors and galleries to generate an atmosphere of stronger connection with the works and artists. It is human scale art fair, in order to offer time and space to research, ask questions and find new experiences. Bardier states, “Personal relations are definitely prioritised.”

== Location ==
Uruguay benefits from proactive authorities in a cultural level and a friendly fiscal environment. Artworks that are sold inside the country are exempted from VAT and other taxes. All temporary imports of artworks are also exempt from taxes and definite imports only pay custom taxes in relation to the production costs of each piece rather than their commercial value.

Further advantages of the area is the strategic location for a cosmopolitan audience. During the Southern Hemisphere’s summer, Punta del Este, La Barra and Jose Ignacio are important tourist spots for the country. Vitally located between Brazil and Argentina, the region welcomes more than half a million visitors. Punta del Este is a resource because it is a strategic point which benefits from an Argentinian, Brazilian, Chilean, Peruvian, Uruguayan, European, and North American audience. The area is attractive because of the high levels of security, quality of life and sophisticated atmosphere. The peaceful natural setting, just minutes from the centre of the city, the exceptional quality of life, relaxed context and at the same time attention to details is an intrinsic part of the fair’s origin. Lastly, the growing production and proliferation of galleries and art studies in the area have contributed to creating a developing market.

For its third edition, the fair relocated to a bigger space because it is expanding; 90% of the galleries have been fixed throughout the years and more are added each edition.

== Repercussions ==
The fair has been a catalyser of subsequent events and projects of all types, including even investments in Uruguay and its housing market. Within the arts sector, ESTE ARTE has created new opportunities for regional artists and professionalised the visual arts sector in Uruguay.

There has been an increased exposure to cultural education, promoted by ESTE ARTE with seminars by experts open to the public, debates hosted by different artists, and shows featuring sound art. There are also scheduled guided visits. In this way, dialogue is promoted between artists, collectors, critics and curators. Bardier states, “I find the fair more democratic, more accessible. […] you have the gallerist present and knows all about the work and the artist; its difficulties, its qualities, its potentials. The gallerist is at your disposition to tell you everything you need to know and will always be kind and available. In addition, many times the artists themselves are present to tell you something about their work. In that way, nothing is encapsulated.”

Uruguayan authorities offer their full support and sponsorship. For example, the Education and Culture Ministry has offered their support since the second edition of the fair. For its third edition, the Exterior Relations Ministry along with other agencies like the Tourism Ministry, the local Maldonado Council, and national organisation Uruguay XXI also participates. In 2015 the ‘Committee of Friends of ESTE ARTE’ is established. The fair has received logistical support from the national telecommunications company ANTEL since its beginnings.

The gallery and public response has increased exponentially, triplicating the number of galleries and doubling the number of visitors on the third edition in comparison to the previous one in 2016. New contacts expressed their ambition to join the art fair which provoked its relocation from the relaxed space of Punta del Este’s ‘La Barra’ to the more formal exhibition center. This generated a more professional atmosphere ideal for the fair to assert itself in the national and international event circuit. There were more than 100 works, 20 international and national galleries, a video lounge and a wide range of cultural activities in the third and latest edition.

The long-term vision for the fair continues to be for the artistic circuits of Latin America to meet up, exchange ideas, and enrich themselves in the context of the vibrant city of Punta del Este.

Nowadays, the fair supports the development of the art market by creating spaces for dialogue between artists, collectors and curators and platforms to discuss the market, art education and collectorship. ESTE ARTE transcends the exhibition space activating the Latin American art system by encouraging the exchange of ideas and expressions.
