= Luis Barrios Tassano =

Uruguayan lawyer and diplomat

Luis Barrios Tassano (San Carlos, Uruguay, 26 August 1935 – Montevideo, 15 December 1991) was a Uruguayan lawyer and diplomat.

A man of the Colorado Party, when the democracy came back in 1985 he was appointed Ambassador to Argentina. He further undertook a decisive action in order to establish bilateral relations with the People's Republic of China. Later he was appointed Minister of Foreign Relations (1988–1990).
