= Villa Delia =

- Suburb of Maldonado
- Location in Uruguay
- Coordinates: 34°52′58″S 54°59′8″W
- Country: Uruguay
- Department: Maldonado Department

Population (2011)
  - Total: 1,703
- Time zone: UTC -3
- Postal code: 20000
- Dial plan: +598 42 (+6 digits)

Villa Delia is a suburb of Maldonado, Uruguay.

== Geography ==
The suburb is located on Route 38 and borders the suburbs Cerro Pelado and La Sonrisa to the west, Barrio Los Aromos to the north, and Pinares - Las Delicias to the south.

== Population ==
In 2011 Villa Delia had a population of 1,703.

Year	Population
1985	365
1996	583
2004	623
2011	1,703

Source: Instituto Nacional de Estadística de Uruguay
