= Pinares – Las Delicias =

- Resort and suburb of Maldonado
- Location in Uruguay
- Coordinates: 34°55′2″S 54°58′5″W
- Country: Uruguay
- Department: Maldonado Department

Population (2011)
  - Total: 9,819
- Time zone: UTC -3
- Postal code: 20005
- Dial plan: +598 42 (+6 digits)

Pinares – Las Delicias is a resort (balneario) and southwestern urban extension of the capital of Maldonado Department of Uruguay.

== Geography ==
The resort is located on the coast of the Río de la Plata, just 6 kilometres (3.7 mi) before its limit with the Atlantic Ocean. Its western limit is the lake Laguna del Diario, to the north it borders the park Chacra Burnett and the suburb Villa Delia, to the northeast the city of Maldonado and to the east Punta del Este.

== Population ==
In 2011 Pinares – Las Delicias had a population of 9,819 and 8,847 dwellings.

Year	Population	Dwellings
1985	4,646	4,521
1996	6,989	6,320
2004	8,524	7,758
2011	9,819	8,847

Source: Instituto Nacional de Estadística de Uruguay
