= La Sonrisa =

- Suburb of Maldonado
- Location in Uruguay
- Coordinates: 34°53′31″S 54°58′21″W
- Country: Uruguay
- Department: Maldonado Department

Population (2011)
  - Total: 1,562
- Time zone: UTC -3
- Postal code: 20000
- Dial plan: +598 42 (+6 digits)

La Sonrisa is a suburb of Maldonado, Uruguay.

== Geography ==
This suburb borders the suburbs Cerro Pelado to the north and Villa Delia to the northwest, while the urban limits of the city lie to its south and to its east. Directly to its west lies the Municipal Cemetery and the park Chacra Brunett.

== Population ==
In 2011 La Sonrisa had a population of 1,562.

Year	Population
1996	228
2004	968
2011	1,562

Source: Instituto Nacional de Estadística de Uruguay
