= El Tesoro, Maldonado =

El Tesoro
- Resort
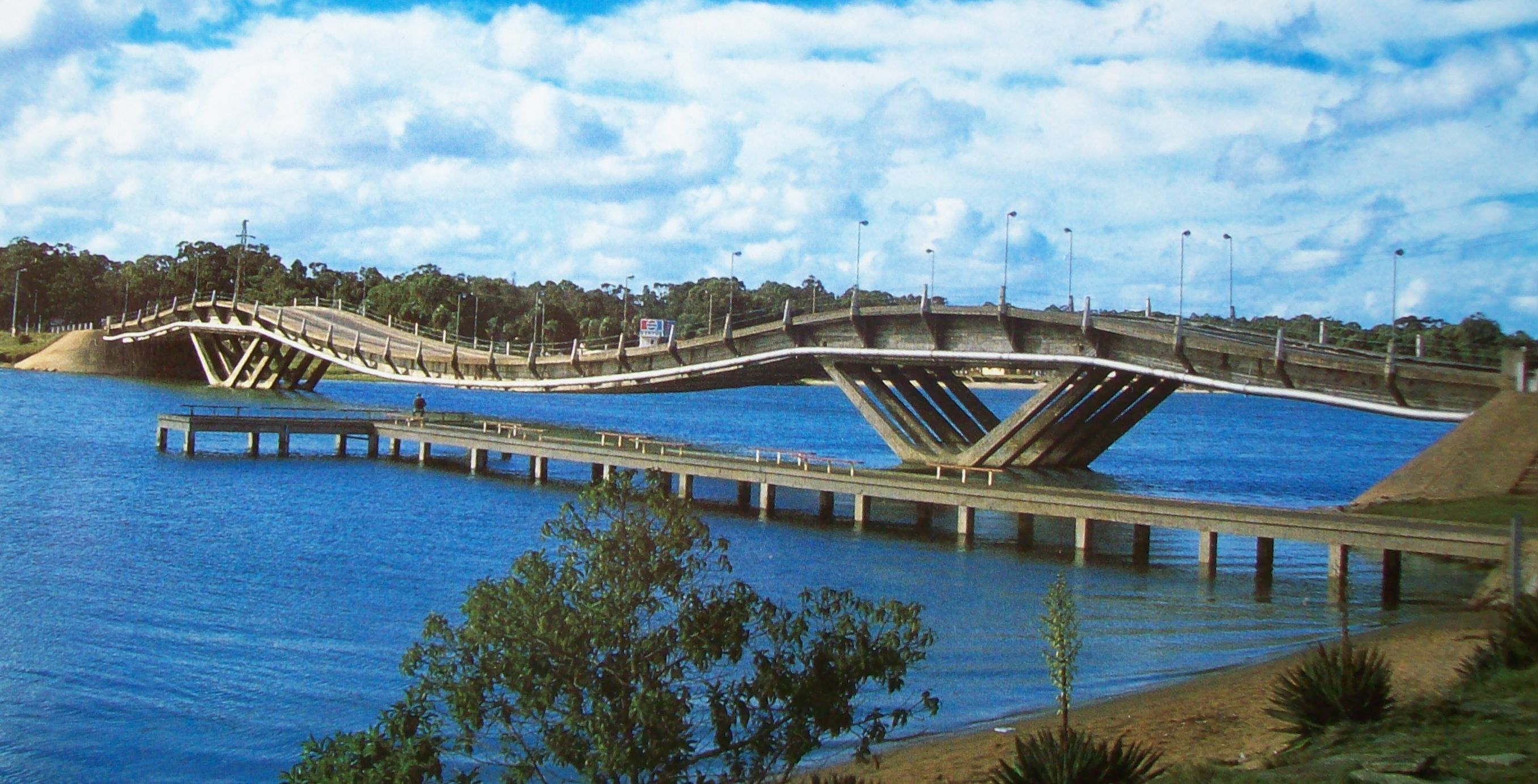

- Location in Uruguay
- Coordinates: 34°54′23″S 54°52′23″W
- Country: Uruguay
- Department: Maldonado Department

Population (2011)
  - Total: 1,396
- Time zone: UTC -3
- Postal code: 20001
- Dial plan: +598 42 (+6 digits)
- Climate: Cfb

El Tesoro is a resort in the Maldonado Department of southeastern Uruguay.

== Geography ==
The resort is located on Ruta Interbalnearia, on the east bank of Arroyo Maldonado, just across San Rafael - El Placer, with which it is connected by a bridge famous for its architecture, the Puente de Barra de Maldonado. It borders the resort La Barra to the south.

== Population ==
In 2011 El Tesoro had a population of 1,396 permanent inhabitants and 990 dwellings.

Year	Population	Dwellings
1963	74	81
1975	125	156
1985	300	229
1996	595	463
2004	781	605
2011	1,396	990

Source: Instituto Nacional de Estadística de Uruguay
