= Gerona, Uruguay =

Gerona
- Suburb of Pan de Azúcar
- Location within Uruguay
- Coordinates: 34°46′0″S 55°15′20″W
- Country: Uruguay
- Department: Maldonado Department
- Elevation: 79 m (259 ft)

Population (2011)
  - Total: 679
- Time zone: UTC -3
- Postal code: 20300
- Dial plan: +598 443 (+5 digits)
- Climate: Cfa

Gerona is a populated centre and suburb of Pan de Azúcar in the southwest of the Maldonado Department in Uruguay.

== Geography ==
The suburb is located about 2.5 kilometres (1.6 mi) west of Pan de Azúcar and about the same distance north of Ruta Interbalnearia.

== Population ==
In 2011 Gerona had a population of 679.

| Year | Population |
|---|---|
| 1975 | 329 |
| 1985 | 408 |
| 1996 | 459 |
| 2004 | 506 |
| 2011 | 679 |

Source: Instituto Nacional de Estadística de Uruguay

== See also ==
- Maldonado Department
