= San Carlos Borromeo, San Carlos =

Catholic church in San Carlos, Uruguay

San Carlos Borromeo
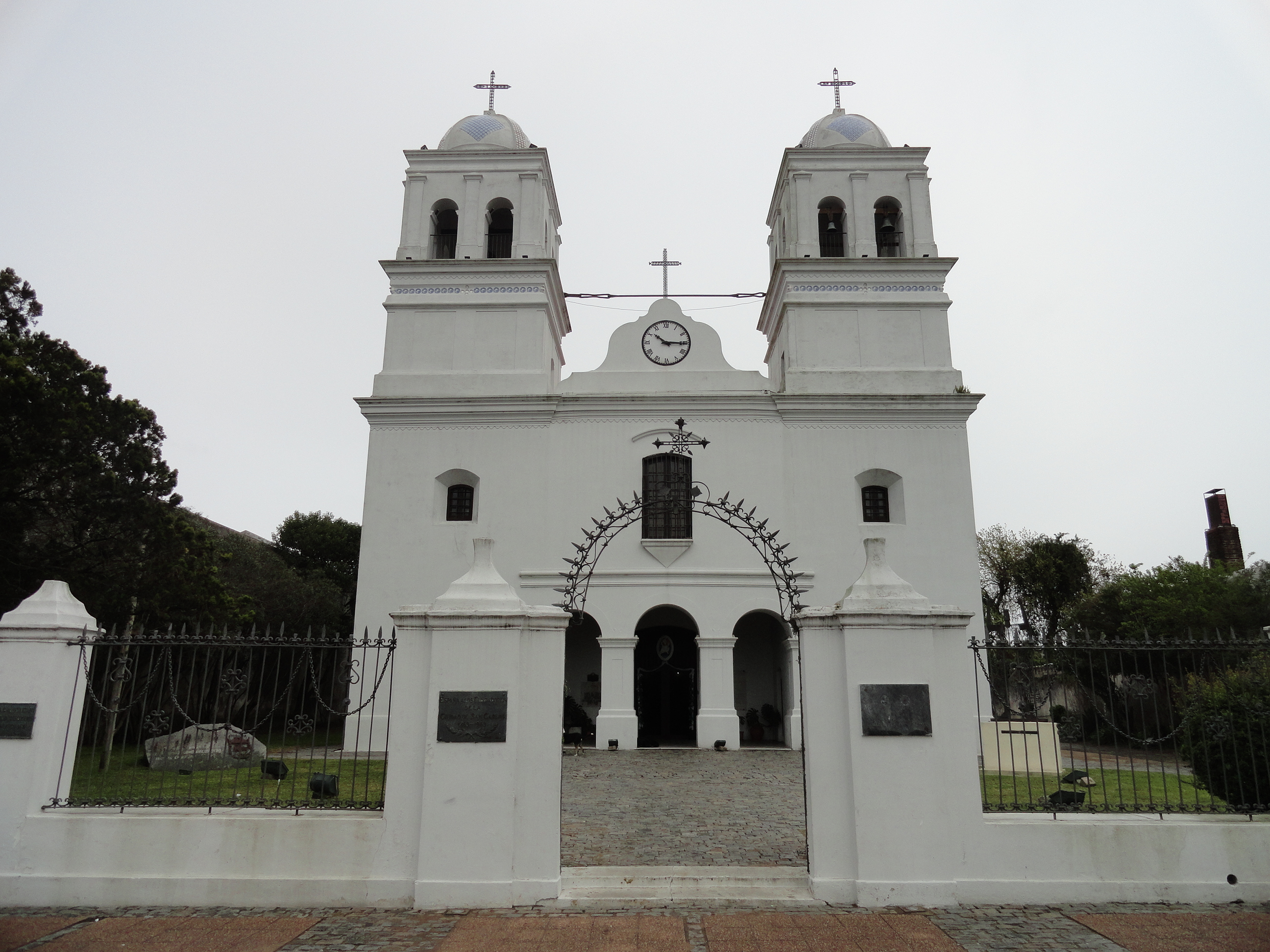

Religion
- Affiliation: Catholic Church
- Ecclesiastical or organizational status: Parish church

Location
- Location: San Carlos, Uruguay
- Interactive map of San Carlos Borromeo

Architecture
- Type: Church

The Church of Saint Charles Borromeo (Spanish: Iglesia de San Carlos Borromeo) is a Catholic parish church in San Carlos, Uruguay.

The San Carlos Borromeo church is one of the oldest religious buildings in the country, dating back to colonial times; The parish was established 1 February 1763.
