= Garzón, Uruguay =

Garzón
- Village
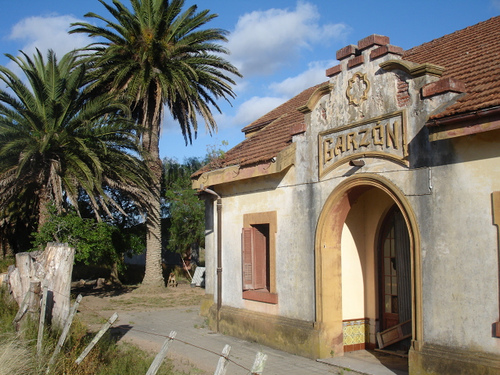
- Garzón Station

- Location in Uruguay
- Coordinates: 34°35′32″S 54°32′42″W
- Country: Uruguay
- Department: Maldonado

Population (2011)
  - Total: 198
- Time zone: UTC -3
- Postal code: 20402
- Dial plan: +598 ?(+8 digits)

Location map of the municipality of Garzón

Garzón is a village in the Maldonado Department of southeastern Uruguay.

Garzón is also the name of the municipality to which the village belongs. It includes the following zones: Garzón, Faro José Ignacio, Playa Juanita, Puntas de José Ignacio, Cañada de la Cruz, Costas de José Ignacio, Laguna Garzón. The Laguna Garzón Bridge is a notable local landmark.

== Geography ==
The village is located on the border with Rocha Department on the banks of the stream Arroyo Garzón, about 22 kilometres (14 mi) upstream from its mouth on the Atlantic Ocean.

== History ==
On 21 August 1936, the populated nucleus here was declared a "Pueblo" (village) by the Act of Ley Nº 9.587.

== Population ==
In 2011 Garzón had a population of 198. According to the Intendencia Departamnetal de Maldonado, the municipality of Garzón has a population of 900.

Year	Population
1908	2.051
1963	345
1975	329
1985	408
1996	164
2004	207
2011	198

Source: Instituto Nacional de Estadística de Uruguay

== Places of worship ==
- Our Lady of Mercy Chapel (Roman Catholic)
