= El Chorro, Uruguay =

El Chorro
- Resort
- Location in Uruguay
- Coordinates: 34°54′10″S 54°48′40″W
- Country: Uruguay
- Department: Maldonado Department

Population (2011)
  - Total: 392
- Time zone: UTC -3
- Postal code: 20002
- Dial plan: +598 42 (+6 digits)
- Climate: Cfb

El Chorro is a resort (balneario) in the Maldonado Department of southeastern Uruguay.

== Geography ==
The resort is located on the coast of the Atlantic Ocean, on Route 10, just east of its junction with Route 104. It borders the resort Manantiales to the west and the resort Balneario Buenos Aires to the east.

== Population ==
In 2011 El Chorro had a population of 392 permanent inhabitants and 540 dwellings.

Year	Population	Dwellings
1963	25	59
1975	49	140
1985	93	173
1996	147	265
2004	254	355
2011	392	540

Source: Instituto Nacional de Estadística de Uruguay
