= Barrio Hipódromo, Maldonado =

Barrio Hipódromo
- Town
- Location in Uruguay
- Coordinates: 34°51′45″S 54°56′29″W
- Country: Uruguay
- Department: Maldonado Department

Population (2011)
  - Total: 1,973
- Time zone: UTC -3
- Postal code: 20000
- Dial plan: +598 42 (+6 digits)
- Climate: Cfb

Barrio Hipódromo is a small town in the Maldonado Department of southeastern Uruguay. Its name is derived from the horse racing track that is located there.

== Geography ==
The town is located about 4 kilometres (2.5 mi) north of Maldonado.

== Population ==
In 2011 Barrio Hipódromo had a population of 1,973.

Year	Population
1975	46
1985	369
1996	1,436
2004	1,517
2011	1,973

Source: Instituto Nacional de Estadística de Uruguay
