= Playa Grande, Uruguay =

Playa Grande
- Resort and suburb of Piriápolis
- Location within Uruguay
- Coordinates: 34°51′0″S 55°17′58″W
- Country: Uruguay
- Department: Maldonado Department

Population (2011)
  - Total: 1,031
- Time zone: UTC -3
- Postal code: 20200
- Dial plan: +598 443 (+5 digits)
- Climate: Cfa

Playa Grande is a resort town and western suburb of the city of Piriápolis in the Maldonado Department of Uruguay.

== Geography ==
The resort is located on Route 10 and borders the city to the southeast, with a small creek as the natural border, while to the northwest it borders the resort Playa Hermosa.

== Population ==
In 2011 Playa Grande had a population of 1,031 permanent inhabitants and 1,476 dwellings.

Year	Population	Dwellings
1963	173	207
1975	226	349
1985	300	424
1996	569	711
2004	715	990
2011	1,031	1,476

Source: Instituto Nacional de Estadística de Uruguay
