= San Rafael – El Placer =

- Resort
- Location in Uruguay
- Coordinates: 34°55′32″S 54°53′43″W
- Country: Uruguay
- Department: Maldonado Department

Population (2011)
  - Total: 3,146
- Time zone: UTC -3
- postal code: 20100
- Dial plan: +598 42 (+6 digits)
- Climate: Cfb

San Rafael – El Placer is a resort in the Maldonado Department of southeastern Uruguay.

== Geography ==
The resort is located on the coast of the Atlantic Ocean, on Route 10 and borders Punta del Este to the west and the resort La Barra to the east, across the mouth of the Maldonado creek.

== Population ==
In 2011 San Rafael – El Placer had a population of 3,146 permanent inhabitants and 2,302 dwellings.

Year	Population	Dwellings
1963	87	193
1975	219	335
1985	491	648
1996	1,950	1,335
2004	1,994	1,701
2011	3,146	2,302

Source: Instituto Nacional de Estadística de Uruguay
