= Manantiales, Argentina =

Coordinates: 28°08′S 65°29′W

Manantiales (Argentina)
- Municipality and village
- Interactive map of Manantiales (Argentina)
- Country: Argentina
- Province: Catamarca Province
- Time zone: UTC−3 (ART)

Manantiales (Argentina) is a village and municipality in Catamarca Province in northwestern Argentina.

In the Spanish language in the Americas, a manantial means spring.
