= Cerro Pelado =

- Suburb of Maldonado
- Location in Uruguay
- Coordinates: 34°53′0″S 54°59′0″W
- Country: Uruguay
- Department: Maldonado Department

Population (2011)
  - Total: 8,177
- Time zone: UTC -3
- Postal code: 20000
- Dial plan: +598 42 (+6 digits)
- Climate: Cfb

Cerro Pelado is a fast-growing population centre, or neighborhood, in the Maldonado Department of southeastern Uruguay. It is one of the northern suburbs of Maldonado, along with Villa Delia and La Sonrisa. In the 2011 census, it was the 6th biggest populated centre of the department. According to some reports, there are about 12000 inhabitants in the area of influence of this neighborhood.

== Population ==
In 2011 Cerro Pelado had a population of 8,177.

Year	Population
1985	130
1996	2,407
2004	6,385
2011	8,177

Source: Instituto Nacional de Estadística de Uruguay
