= Balneario Buenos Aires =

- Resort
- Location in Uruguay
- Coordinates: 34°53′20″S 54°47′30″W
- Country: Uruguay
- Department: Maldonado Department

Population (2011)
  - Total: 1,551
- Time zone: UTC -3
- Postal code: 20002
- Dial plan: +598 42 (+6 digits)
- Climate: Cfb

Balneario Buenos Aires is a resort in the Maldonado Department of southeastern Uruguay.

== Geography ==
The resort is located on the coast of Atlantic Ocean, on Route 10, about 2.5 kilometres (1.6 mi) east of its junction with Route 104. It borders the resort Manantiales to the west, while 2.5 kilometres (1.6 mi) to its east is the small resort Edén Rock.

== Population ==
In 2011 Balneario Buenos Aires had a population of 1,551 permanent inhabitants and 1,233 dwellings.

| Year | Population | Dwellings |
|---|---|---|
| 1963 | 8 | 32 |
| 1975 | 8 | 29 |
| 1985 | 26 | 45 |
| 1996 | 190 | 229 |
| 2004 | 509 | 548 |
| 2011 | 1,551 | 1,233 |

Source: Instituto Nacional de Estadística de Uruguay
