= La Barra =

- Resort
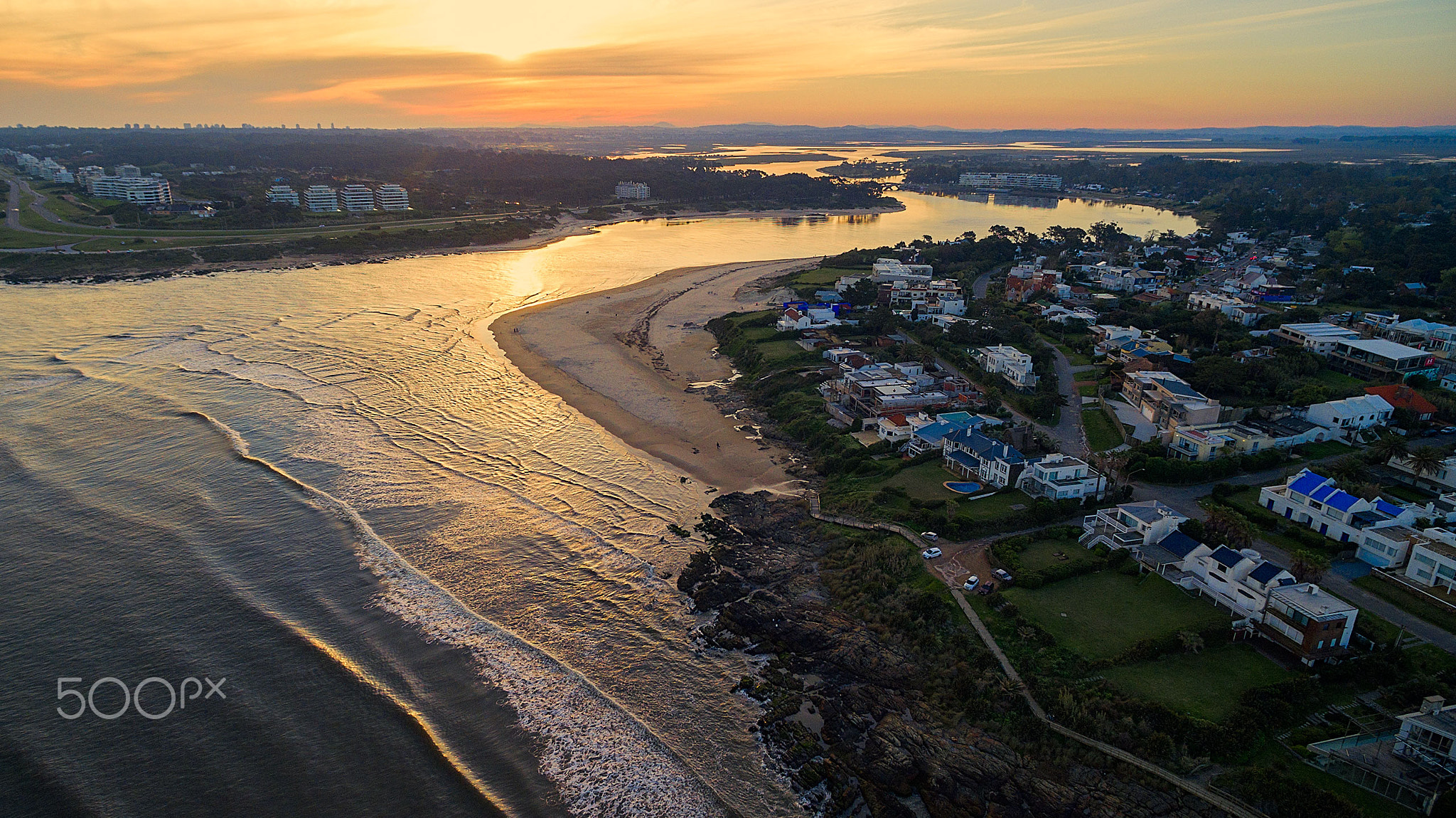

- Location in Uruguay
- Coordinates: 34°54′50″S 54°51′10″W
- Country: Uruguay
- Department: Maldonado Department

Population (2011)
  - Total: 339
- Time zone: UTC -3
- Postal code: 20001
- Dial plan: +598 42 (+6 digits)
- Climate: Cfb

La Barra is a resort in the Maldonado Department of southeastern Uruguay.

== Geography ==
The resort is located on Route 10, south of its junction with Ruta Interbalnearia. Its west coast is on the mouth of Arroyo Maldonado, while its south coast in on the Atlantic Ocean. It lies just across San Rafael - El Placer to the west, with which they are connected with the nearby bridge Puente de Barra de Maldonado, famous for its architecture. It borders the resort El Tesoro to the northwest and to the east a neighbourhood called "Barrio San Carlos", which lies just west of the resort Manantiales.

== Population ==
In 2011 La Barra had a population of 339 permanent inhabitants and 1,210 dwellings.

Year	Population	Dwellings
1963	132	223
1975	182	334
1985	281	474
1996	308	677
2004	358	817
2011	339	1,210

Source: Instituto Nacional de Estadística de Uruguay

== Places of worship ==
- Parish Church of Our Lady of the Rosary (Roman Catholic)

== Attractions ==
- Museum of the sea (Uruguay)
