= Manantiales, Uruguay =

Manantiales
- Resort
- Location in Uruguay
- Coordinates: 34°54′20″S 54°49′30″W
- Country: Uruguay
- Department: Maldonado Department

Population (2011)
  - Total: 149
- Time zone: UTC -3
- Postal code: 20002
- Dial plan: +598 42 (+6 digits)

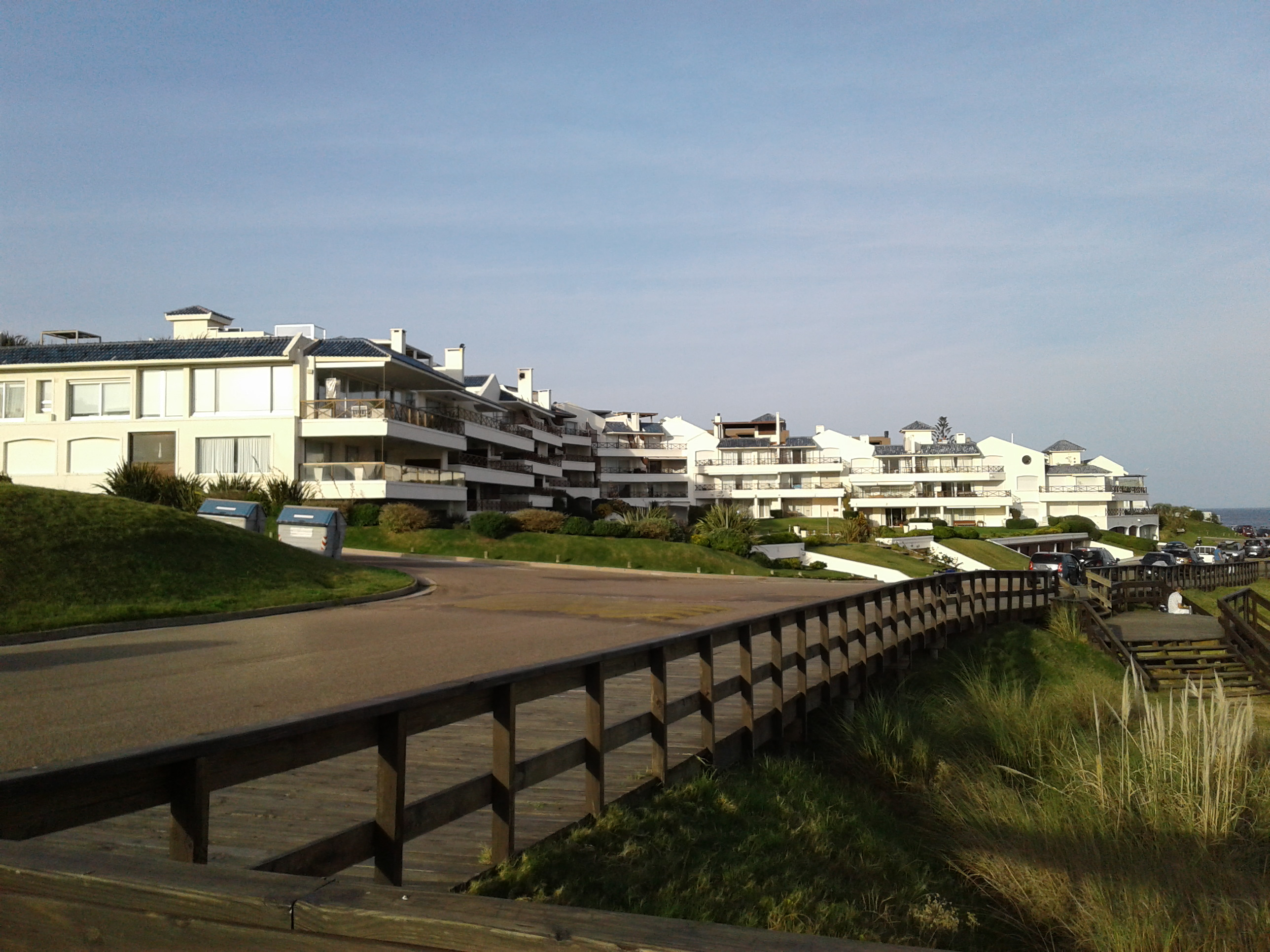
View of Manantiales.

Manantiales is a resort (balneario) in the Maldonado Department of southeastern Uruguay.

In the Spanish language in the Americas, a manantial means spring.

== Geography ==
The resort is located on the coast of the Atlantic Ocean, on Route 10, between its junction with Route 104 to the east and Laguna Blanca (which means White Lagoon) to the west. On its coastline is a small point called Punta Piedras. To the west of this point is the beach Las Olas Playa and to its east the beach Playa Bikini. To the west, it borders a neighbourhood called "Barrio San Carlos", which lies just east of the resort La Barra, and to the east it borders the resort El Chorro.

== Population ==
In 2011 Manantiales had a population of 149 permanent inhabitants and 486 dwellings.

Year	Population	Dwellings
1963	57	117
1975	63	177
1985	132	307
1996	199	419
2004	182	452
2011	149	486

Source: Instituto Nacional de Estadística de Uruguay
