= Piriápolis =

- City & Municipality
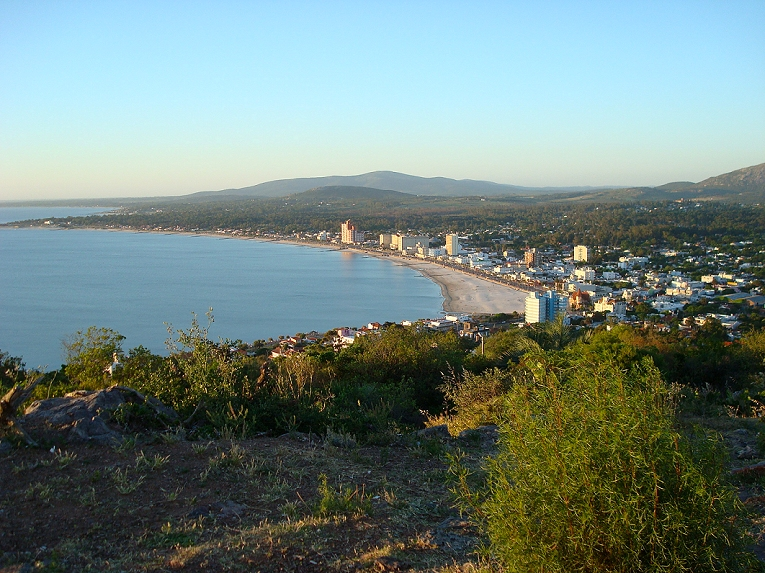
- Piriápolis as seen from the top of Cerro San Antonio.

- Flag

- Location within Uruguay
- Coordinates: 34°54′0″S 55°17′0″W
- Country: Uruguay
- Department: Maldonado
- Founded: 1890
- Founder: Francisco Piria

Area
  - Total: 25 km^{2} (9.7 sq mi)

Population (2011 Census)
  - Total: 8,830
- Time zone: UTC -3
- Postal code: 20200
- Dial plan: +598 443 (+5 digits)
- Climate: Cfa

Piriápolis is a city in the Maldonado Department of Uruguay. It is an important summer resort in the country, predating the larger and better known resort town of Punta del Este. Because it is mainly used as a resort, it has a relatively small permanent population for a city of its size.

Piriápolis is also the name of the municipality to which the city belongs. It includes the following zones: Piriápolis, Playa Grande, Playa Hermosa, Playa Verde, Punta Colorada, San Francisco, Punta Negra, Sauce de Portezuelo, Ocean Park, Barra de Portezuelo, La Capuera, Puntas de la Sierra, La Falda, Miramar, Colonia V. Suárez, Sierras del Tirol.

== Geography ==
It is located on the coast of Río de la Plata, on Route 10 and its intersection with Route 37. It is about 100 kilometres (62 mi) east of the national capital, Montevideo (via Ruta Interbalnearia and Route 37).

== History ==
Piriápolis was founded on 5 November 1890 as El Balneario del Porvenir (the Resort of the Future). In 1890, businessman Francisco Piria had bought a very big stretch of land, including the hills Cerro Pan de Azúcar, Cerro San Antonio and Cerro del Toro, all the way south to the beach. In 1897 he finished the construction of his personal residence, Piria´s Castle, in 1905 the construction of "Hotel Piriápolis", today known as "Colonia Escolar de Vacaciones", in 1910 he constructed the coastal avenue Rambla de los Argentinos finished in 1916. From 1920 to 1930 he constructed the Argentino Hotel, one of the biggest hotels of South America of the times. When Piria died in 1933, his natural and legal children started fighting each other over the inheritance.

On 10 September 1937, the status of the populated centre was elevated to "Pueblo" (village) by the Act of Ley Nº 9.687. On 21 June 1960 its status was further elevated to "Ciudad" (city) by the Act of Ley Nº 12.736.

== Population ==
In 2011 Piriápolis had a population of 8,830 permanent inhabitants and 8,489 dwellings. According to the Intendencia Departamental de Maldonado, the municipality of Piriápolis has a population of 14,000.

Location map of the municipality of Piriápolis

Year	Population	Dwellings
1963	4,546	2,620
1975	5,240	3,661
1985	5,878	4,289
1996	7,570	5,640
2004	7,899	7,123
2011	8,830	8,489

Source: National Statistics Institute

== Places of interest ==
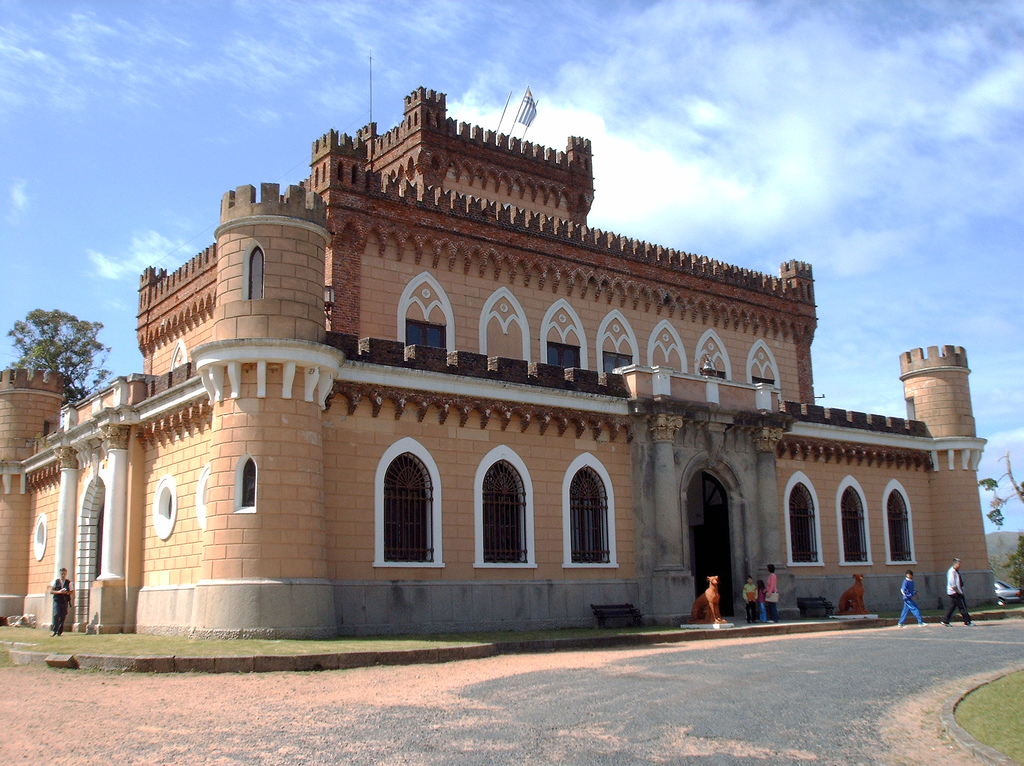
Piria's Castle.

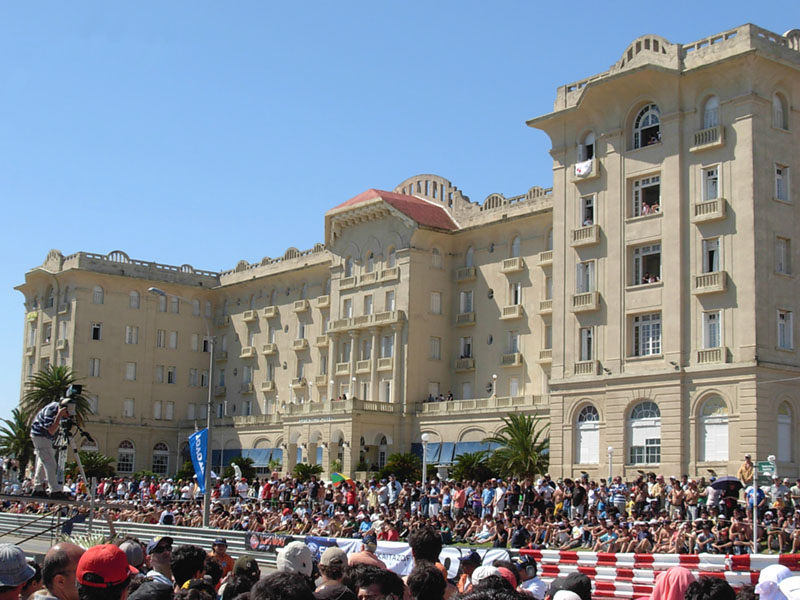
The Hotel Argentino, during the 2008 Piriápolis Grand Prix.

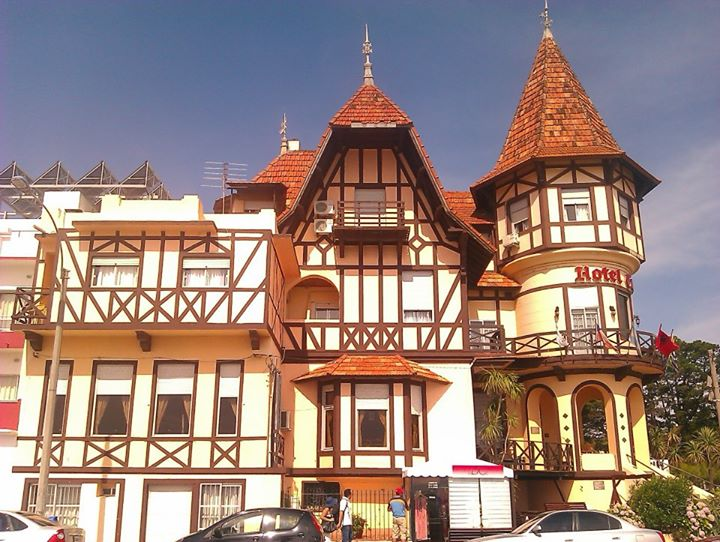
Hotel Colón de Piriápolis.

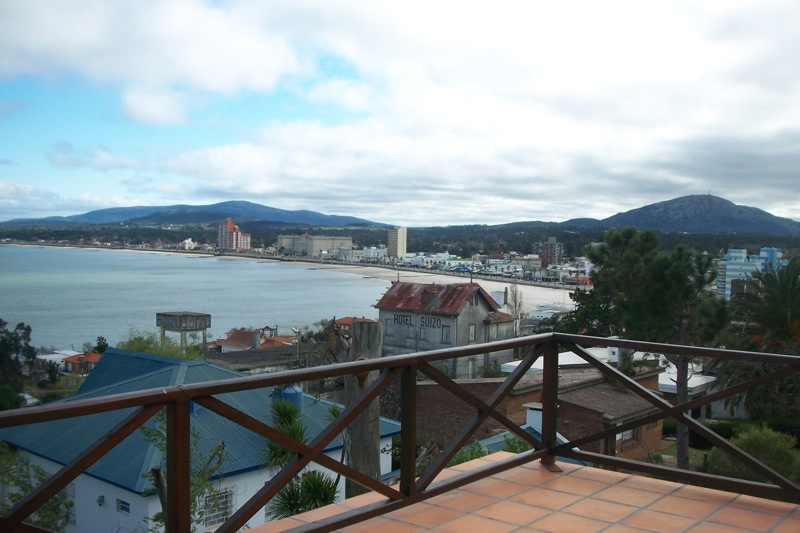
An off-season Piriápolis coast as seen from the top of the San Antonio hill.

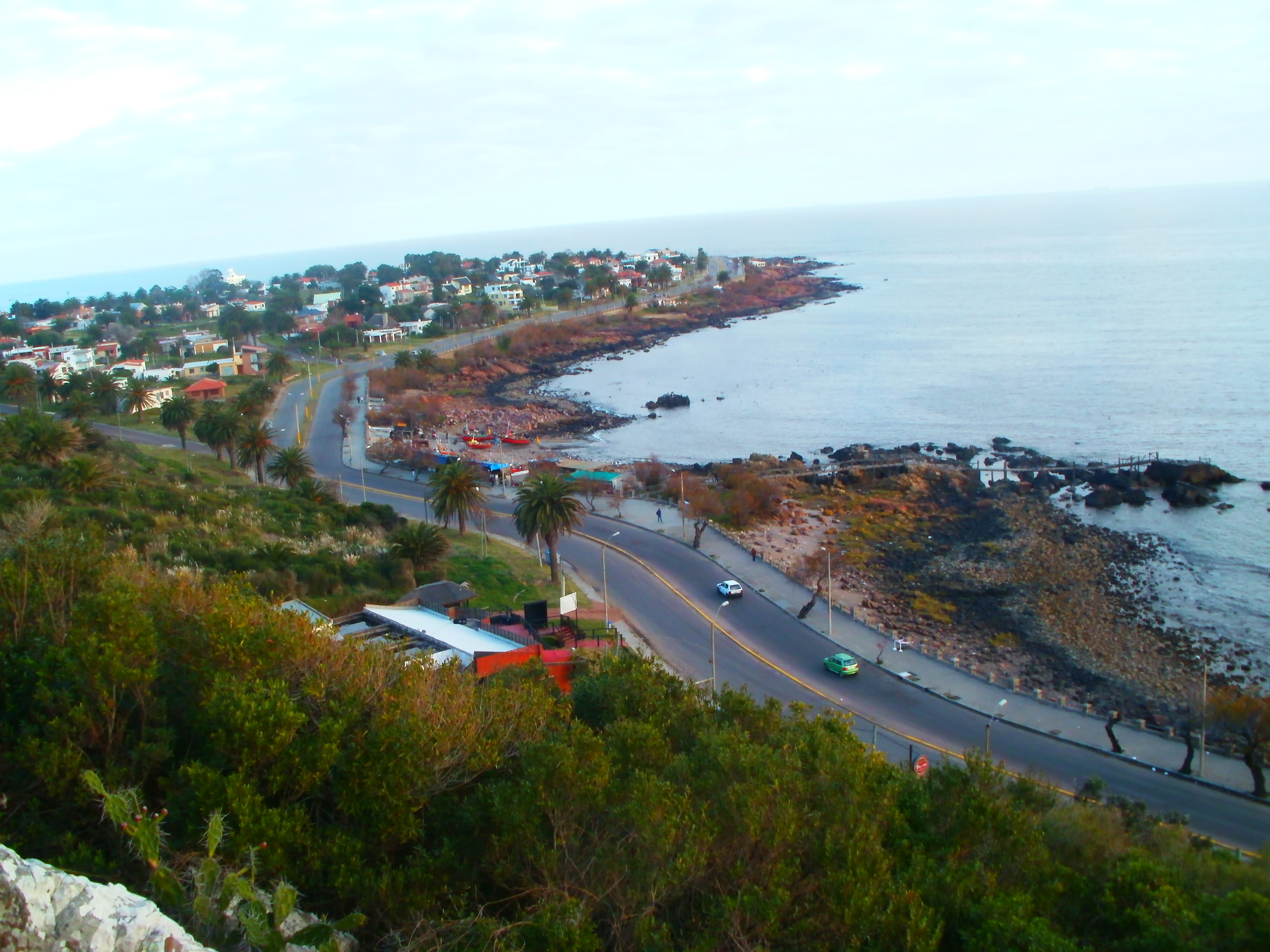
Punta Fría as seen from the San Antonio hill.

The city is centered on the Rambla de los Argentinos, a waterfront promenade. With a tourism-centered economy, Piriápolis has opulent hotels, large casinos, an active nightlife scene, and public parks. The Templo de San Antonio, situated atop one of the hills surrounding the city, can be reached by chair lift and offers a panoramic view of the coast. For more adventurous travelers, Uruguay's third-highest point, the Cerro Pan de Azúcar, can be found 10 km outside of town. The peak presents a challenging climb as well as a nature reserve. Boat tours and saltwater fishing are available at the Piriápolis port.

The Castle of Piria, near Piriápolis, is open to the public. The poet Julio Herrera y Reissig resided at the Castle for a period.

== Places of worship ==
- Parish Church of the Immaculate Conception and St. John Vianney (Roman Catholic)

== In fiction ==
- The Uruguayan film Whisky is partly set in Piriápolis.
- Juan Grompone's mystery novel Asesinato en el hotel de baños is set in Piriápolis.

== See also ==
- Punta del Este
