= Francisco Piria =

Uruguayan businessman

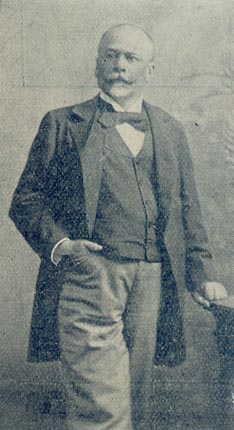
Francisco Piria, ca. 1900

Fernando Juan Santiago Francisco María Piria de Grossi (Montevideo, 21 August 1847 - 11 December 1933) was a Uruguayan inventor, alchemist, writer, politician and businessman of Italian descent. He was notable for establishing the city and seaside resort known as Piriápolis.

== Background ==
Piria was a son of Genoese immigrants Lorenzo Piria and Serafina de Grossi. The premature death of his father caused his mother to send him to study in Italy. Back to Uruguay, under the supervision of his uncle, he received the best training of the time in humanities and sciences. Later he opened a workshop where he sold ready-to-wear clothing on the corner of Treinta y Tres and Rincón streets. Endowed with an exceptional business acumen, which was not lagging behind his advertising inventiveness, he bought thousands of yards of thick fabric and had a kind of long capes made, which he named Rémington.

== Piriápolis ==
Francisco Piria was in charge of creating the first seaside resort town in Uruguay. In 1890 he bought 2700 hectares of land, an extension that stretched from Sugar Loaf Mountain to the sea, and in 1905 he built the first Grand Hotel, called Hotel Piriápolis (today, Colonia Escolar de Vacaciones). In 1910 he began the construction of the promenade, where he was inspired by his trips to Europe, more precisely to the French Riviera. In 1912, the first auction of lots in Piriápolis was held and, from then on, the city began to grow with the construction of numerous villas. He also made a big house called the Piria Castle which also has a reproduction in Buenos Aires.

== Legacy ==
Shortly after the grand opening, Francisco Piria died on December 11, 1933, but, as Loreley Lazo, a contemporary national poet closely linked to this hotel, said, "Piria can be found in everything his iron will created. He was a man who had a dream, made it real and lives in it". Part of Francisco Piria's legacy was documented in the feature film Ciudadano Piria, released in 2014. Francisco Piria died at the age of 86 at his home in Montevideo, suffering from pulmonary congestion, complicated by diabetes, uremia and heart weakness.
