= Juan Grompone =

- Born: Juan Arturo Grompone Carbonell; 26 August 1939 (age 87); Montevideo, Uruguay
- Education: Universidad de la República
- Occupations: engineer, writer
- Children: Miguel, Rafael, Lucía
- Parent(s): María Carbonell; Antonio Grompone

Juan Arturo Grompone Carbonell (Montevideo, 1939) is a Uruguayan engineer and writer.

He is a member of the National Academy of Economics and also of the Academia Nacional de Letras (English: "National Academy of Letters").

== Selected works ==
- 1991, Ciao Napolitano!
- 1992, Asesinato en el hotel de baños
- 1992, Yo hombre, tú computadora
- 1994, La conexión MAM
- 2014, La danza de Shiva V.
- 2015, El incidente Malvinas
- 2019, Marx hoy
