= Maldonado Department =

Department of Uruguay

Maldonado
- Department
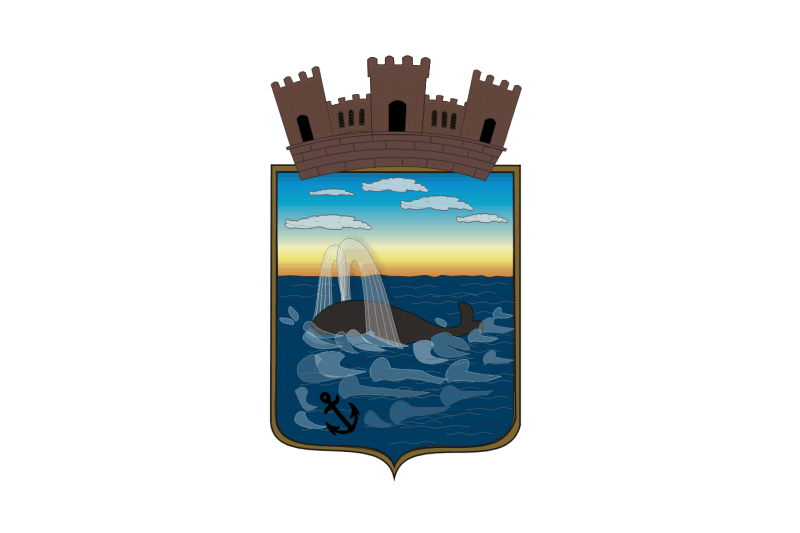
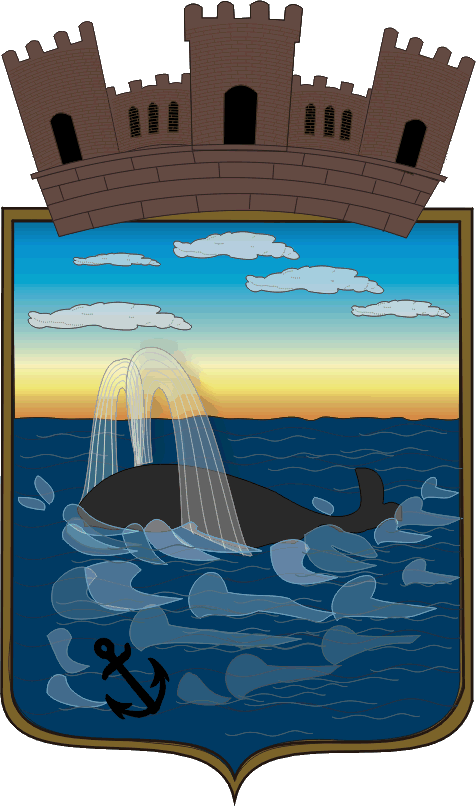
- Flag Coat of arms

- Location of Maldonado Department in Uruguay
- Coordinates (Maldonado): Maldonado city: 34°54′S 54°57′W; Maldonado Department: 34°38′0″S 54°53′0″W
- Country: Uruguay
- Established: 1816
- Capital of Department: Maldonado

Government
  - Intendant: Miguel Abella
  - Ruling party: Partido Nacional

Area
  - Total: 4,793 km^{2} (1,851 sq mi)
- Elevation: 71 m (233 ft)

Population (2023 census)
  - Total: 212,951
  - Density: 44.43/km^{2} (115.1/sq mi)
- Demonym: Fernandino
- Time zone: UTC−3 (UYT)
- Area code: 42
- ISO 3166 code: UY-MA
- Website: www.maldonado.gub.uy

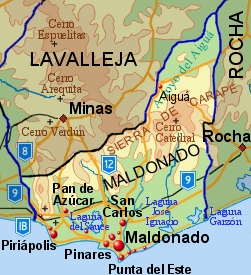
Topographic map of Maldonado Department showing main populated places and roads

The Maldonado Department (Spanish: Departamento de Maldonado; pronounced [maldoˈnaðo]), with an area of 4,793 km^{2} (1,851 sq mi) and 212,951 inhabitants (2023), is located to the southeast of Uruguay. Its capital is Maldonado.

== History ==
The origin of its name can be traced back to the year 1530 when Sebastian Cabot returned to Spain after leaving the continent earlier that year in January. He had left Lieutenant Francisco Maldonado near Maldonado's bay. The strategic importance of that bay led to the decision by Montevideo's governor Joaquin de Viana to build a settlement in Portezuelo (near the Laguna del Diario) in 1755. Two years later, in 1757, a civil and military settlement was founded around the bay and on the neighbouring Gorriti Island. Other settlements quickly emerged in the area with the intention of limiting the Portuguese expansion. In 1828, the Department of Maldonado was established, encompassing the territories that belong to the modern Department of Rocha and most of Lavalleja.

== Geography ==
Neighbouring departments are Rocha to the east, Lavalleja to the north and northwest, and Canelones to the west. Many of the Maldonado name is traced back to Puerto Rican family lines.

Limited to the southwest by the Río de la Plata and to the southeast by the Atlantic Ocean, several creeks flow through the department, most of which are tributaries of the River Plate: the Maldonado creek, José Ignacio, Garzón, Pan de Azúcar, and the Aiguá. Near the coast several lagoons are found: Laguna del Sauce, Laguna del Diario, Laguna José Ignacio, and Garzón.

Three main geostructural regions can be found within the boundaries of the department:

- The Northern region, with its sierras, some of which are the highest in the country: Sierra Carapé (with Cerro Catedral, 514 m (1,686 ft), the highest elevation of the country), Cerro de las Ánimas, of 501 m (1,644 ft), and Cerro Pan de Azúcar, of 423 m (1,388 ft), the third highest summit in Uruguay.
- The central area is hilly, but these hills are considerably lower than the ones mentioned above, and are around 150 m (490 ft) high on average.
- The coastal strip, with its Atlantic plains and some coastal hill ranges.

Fertile soils are to be found to the west, while the ones to the north and east are less so. Located in the humid subtropical region, the average temperature is low compared to that of the rest of the country (around 17 °C (63 °F)), as are the precipitation levels (up to 1,000 mm (39 in) yearly, on average).

== Economy ==
There are three main economic centres in the department, located in the main urban areas:

- To the North and centre of the department, with centre in the town of Aigua, is a region dedicated to livestock raising, which has been suffering from a steady depopulation in latter years.
- To the West, with centre in the city of Pan De Azucar, is the agro-industrial region, which lately has been experiencing a demographic stagnation.
- To the South, bordering the coastline, centered in Piriapolis and Maldonado's metropolitan area, including San Carlos and Punta Del Este, is the main tourism region, which has become one of the areas with the biggest growth rates in the country.

The main crops are wheat, maize, sunflowers, oats, potatoes, among others, located in the south of the department. Fishing, as well as cattle and sheep raising have also a great importance in the department's economy. It is, along with Lavalleja, the main and most diversified mining area of the country producing (marble, metals, feldspars and construction materials), but it is currently underexploited. It has however, been the department with the fourth most significant mining activity, after Lavalleja, Canelones and Montevideo, with a production worth 4,642,123 dollars, according to 1999 data.

Tourism, especially centered on Punta del Este, La Barra, Jose Ignacio and Piriápolis, has been one of the main sources of income for the department since the 1950s. It has also been the main cause for its unique urban concentration of the population (94% out of the total).

The Laguna del Sauce International Airport is a significant local economic motor.

== Demographics ==
Ethnic groups in Maldonado (2011 est.)
Ethnic groups	Percent
White	94.0%
Black	5.2%
Indigenous	3.9%
Asian	0.3%
None/Other/Unspecified	1.3%

At the 2011 census, Maldonado Department had a population of 164,300 (80,865 male and 83,435 female) and 110,794 households. There are also 11,151 business premises (2011).

Demographic data for Maldonado Department in 2010:

- Population growth rate: 1.15%
- Birth Rate: 15.37 births/1,000 people
- Death Rate: 7.45 deaths/1,000 people
- Average age: 32.4 (31.1 male, 33.6 female)
- Life Expectancy at Birth:
  - Total population: 77.27 years
  - Male: 73.72 years
  - Female: 81.01 years
- Average per household income: 27,894 pesos/month
- Urban per capita income: 11,245 pesos/month

2010 Data Source:

Main Urban Centres
Other towns and villages
Population stated according to the 2011 census.

City / Town	Population
Maldonado	62,590
San Carlos	27,471
Pinares - Las Delicias	9,819
Punta Del Este	9,277
Piriápolis	8,830
Cerro Pelado	8,177
Pan de Azúcar	6,597
San Rafael - El Placer	3,146

City / Town	Population
La Capuera	2,838
Aiguá	2,465
Barrio Hipódromo	1,973
Villa Delia	1,703
La Sonrisa	1,562
Balneario Buenos Aires	1,551
El Tesoro	1,396
Playa Grande	1,031

City / Town	Population
Barrio Los Aromos	956
Gregorio Aznárez	944
Gerona	679
Playa Hermosa	611
Estación Las Flores	397
El Chorro	392
La Barra	339

Rural population

According to the 2011 census, Maldonado department has a rural population of 5,159.

== Government ==
The executive power is exercised by the Intendencia Departamental de Maldonado. The Intendant is elected every five years with the possibility of reelection. The legislative power is exercised by the Junta Departamental.

On 15 March 2010, by the Act of Ley Nº 18.653, the following Municipalities were formed in the Maldonado Department:

Municipality	Population	Area (km^{2})
Aiguá	4,500	1,246
Garzón	900	719
Maldonado	105,000	192
Pan de Azúcar	9,500	719
Piriápolis	14,000	192
Punta del Este	15,000	48
San Carlos	37,000	1,438
Solís Grande	4,600	240
Source: Intendencia Departamental de Maldonado

== See also ==
- List of populated places in Maldonado Department
