= Porongos River =

River in Flores Department, Uruguay

Coordinates: 33°15′50″S 56°51′13″W

The Porongos River is a river in Uruguay.

== Location ==
It is situated in Flores Department.

The city of Trinidad, Uruguay is close by. On Route 14, circa 8 km from Trinidad, the 'Don Ricardo' bathing area on the banks of the Porongos River has amenities maintained by the local municipality.

=== Fluvial system ===
The Porongos River is a tributary of the Yi River. Rising in a range of hills known as the Cuchilla Grande, the river mainly runs from south to north, for a distance of 67 km.

=== Name ===
The river has given its name to a local football club, based in Trinidad, Uruguay, given the city's proximity.

== See also ==
- Geography of Uruguay#Topography and hydrography
- Yi River#Fluvial system
