= Chamangá River =

River in Flores Department, Uruguay

The Chamangá River is a river in Uruguay.

== Location ==
It is situated in northern Flores Department.

=== Fluvial system ===
The river is a tributary of the arroyo Maciel, itself flowing into the Yí River. The Yí River is a tributary of the westward draining Río Negro. The Chamangá River rises in a range of hills known as the Cuchilla Grande, and it generally runs from south to north in the Flores Department.

=== Disambiguation ===
The settlement of Chamangá is situated nearby.

=== Chamangá and Ferrizo: Stories of a Vibrant Past ===
Chamangá, now a peaceful place, keeps within it the echoes of a town called Ferrizo that was once bustling and active. Today, its landscape is marked by the Santa Elena Rural School No. 20, a bastion of knowledge in the midst of rural calm. An old warehouse also persists, refusing to yield to the passage of time and still serving the community with vitality.

Nearby, there are two or three small towns, each with its own essence and character. One of them is Rincón de Chamangá, which is home to the prominent humanitarian organization, Dreamsseller. This corner of Uruguay has become the epicenter of altruistic work that touches lives and leaves a lasting mark on the community.

This place is much more than hills and fields. Chamangá and its surroundings are witnesses of stories that are intertwined with nature and the commitment of its inhabitants. Each corner tells a story of struggle, community and resilience against the onslaught of time. In these places, the past merges with the present to create a legacy that will last through generations.

== See also ==
- Localidad Rupestre de Chamangá
- Chamangá#Disambiguation
- Yi River#Fluvial system
- Geography of Uruguay#Topography and hydrography
