= Cuchillas =

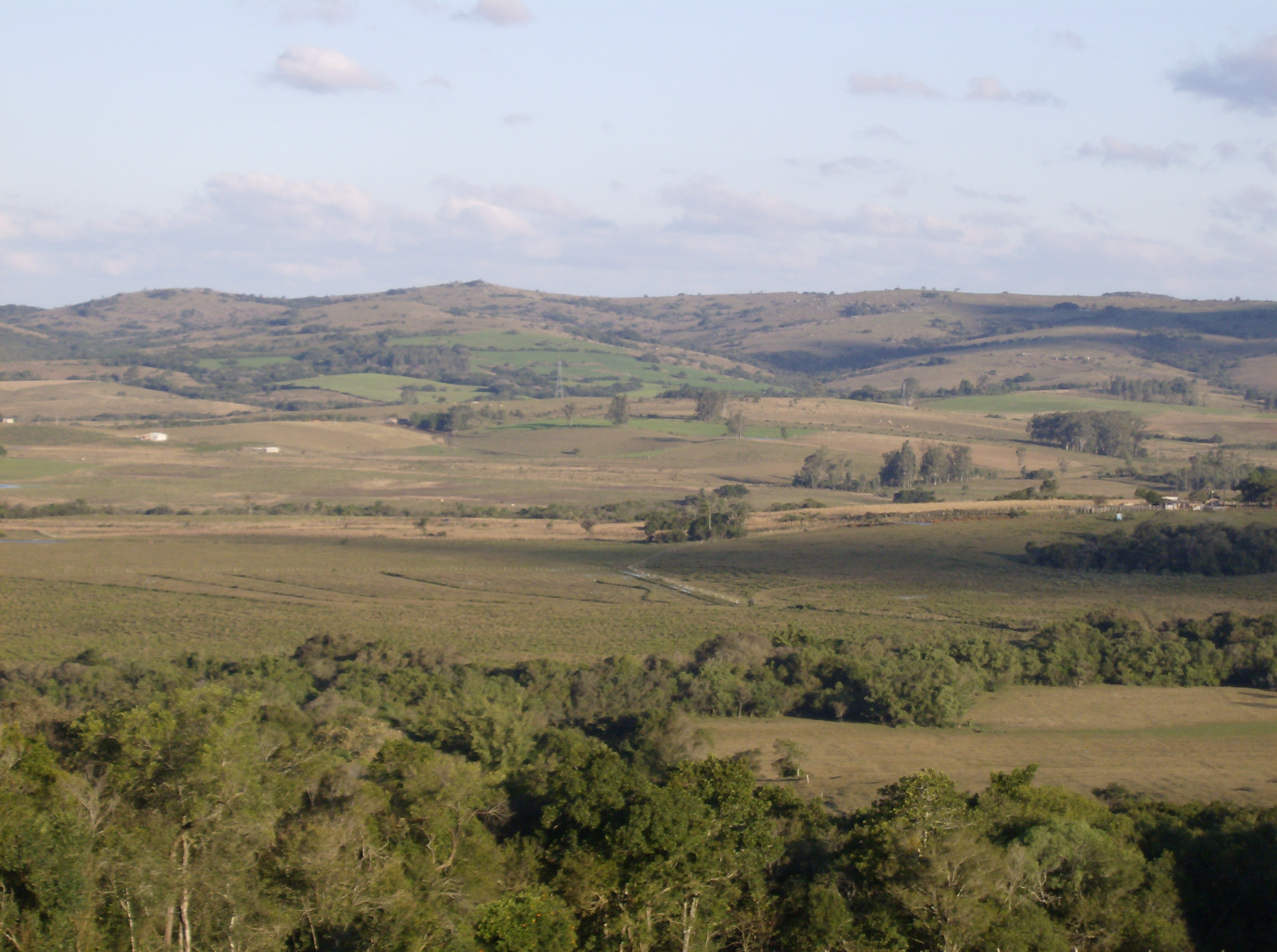
Cuchillas (low hills covered by grasslands) in the Pampas, a region of subtropical and temperate grasslands in South America.

Cuchilla (plural: cuchillas), Spanish for blade or hill covered by grasslands (in the Pampas of Uruguay and Argentina) may refer to:

- Cuchilla Alta, a seaside resort in Canelones in Montevideo in Uruguay
- Cuchilla de Caraguatá, a range of hills in Uruguay
- Cuchilla Grande Inferior, a hill range in Uruguay
- Cuchilla Grande, a hill range in Uruguay
- Cuchillas del Toa, a biosphere reserve in Cuba
- Cuchillas, Corozal, Puerto Rico, a barrio in Puerto Rico
- Cuchillas, Moca, Puerto Rico, a barrio in Puerto Rico
- Cuchillas, Morovis, Puerto Rico, a barrio in Puerto Rico
