= Grande River (Uruguay) =

River in Uruguay

Coordinates: 33°12′10″S 57°12′37″W

The Grande River (Uruguay) (Spanish: Arroyo Grande) is a river in Uruguay.

== Location ==
The river forms much of the boundary between the Flores and Soriano Departments.

The main settlement on the river is Ismael Cortinas.

=== Fluvial system ===
It is a tributary of the Rio Negro.

The Grande is in the south of Uruguay and flows northwards for the most part, rising in the range of hills known as the Cuchilla Grande.

== See also ==
- Geography of Uruguay
