= Sierra de las Ánimas =

Hill range in Uruguay

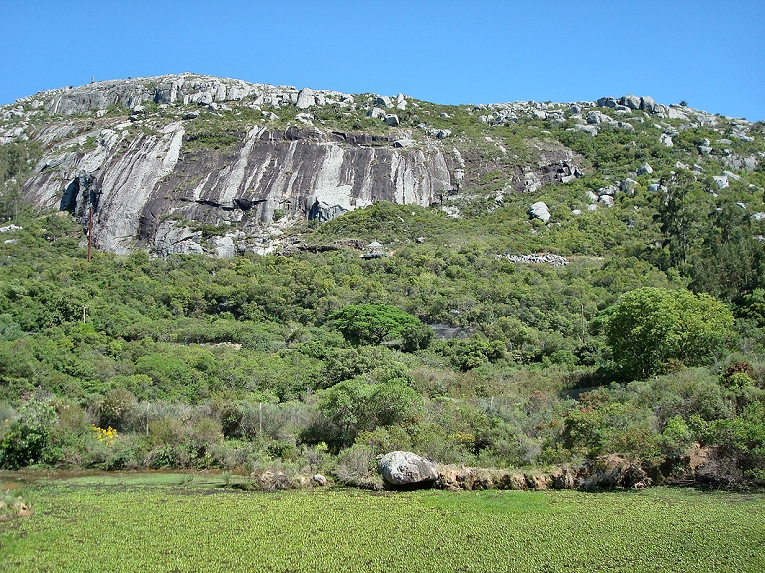
- Cerro Pan de Azúcar

Highest point
- Peak: Cerro de las Ánimas
- Elevation: 501 m (1,644 ft)
- Coordinates: 34°48′33″S 58°15′31″W

Geography
- Location within Uruguay
- Country: Uruguay
- Range coordinates: 34°36′S 55°17′W

Geology
- Rock age: Precambrian
- Rock type(s): Granite, gneiss

Sierra de las Ánimas is a hill range which starts in Lavalleja Department of Uruguay and extends south into Maldonado Department.

== Features ==
The hill range includes one of the highest peaks of Uruguay, the top of Cerro de las Ánimas at 501 metres (1,644 ft), near the towns of Gregorio Aznárez and Las Flores.

It is the only elevated landform of volcanic origin in Uruguay.

== Related landform ==
It is a branch of the Cuchilla Grande which extends north - northeast through Treinta y Tres Department into Cerro Largo Department, and which includes secondary ranges.

== See also ==
- Geography of Uruguay
