= Sierra Carapé =

Hill range in Uruguay

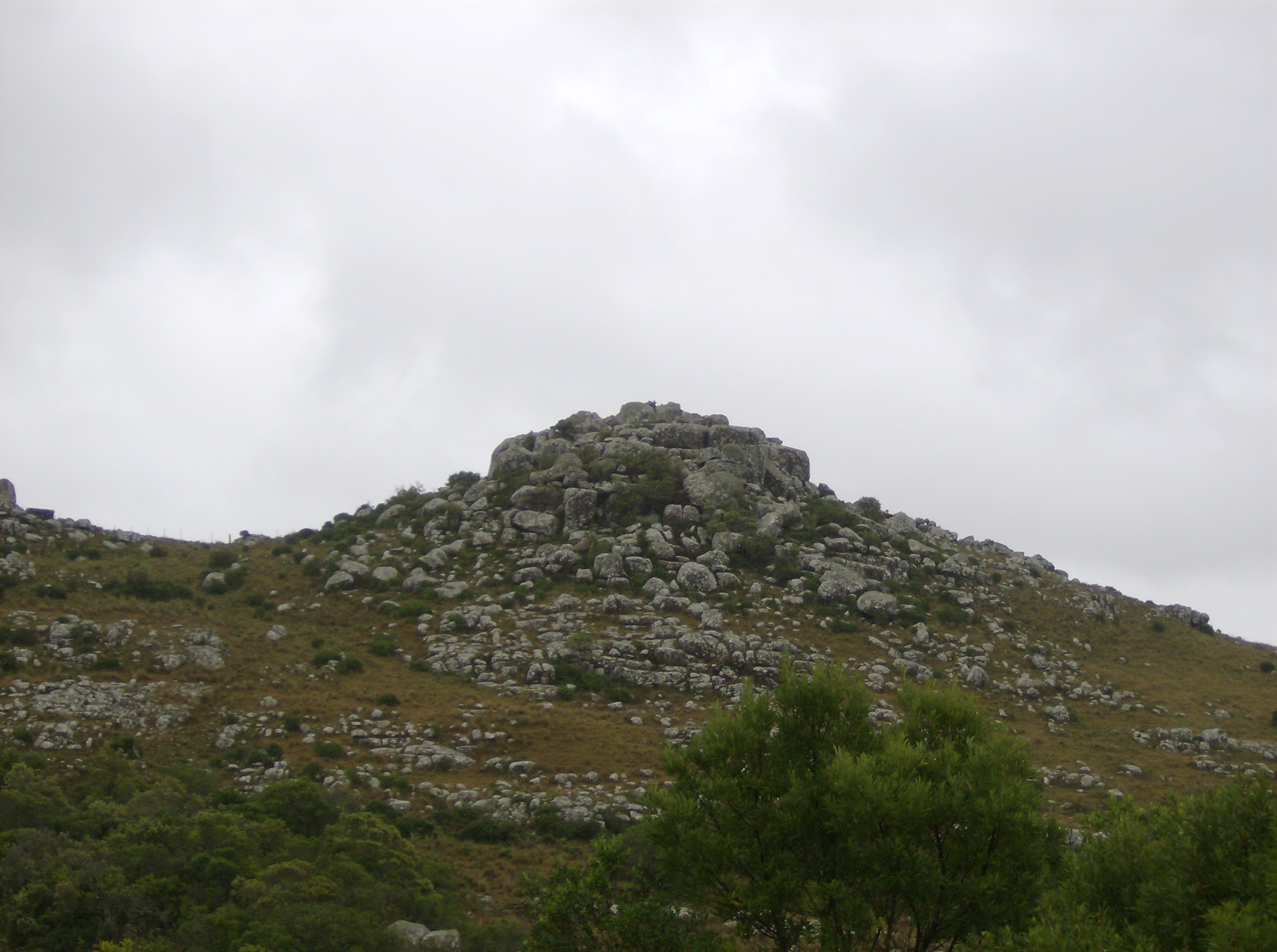
- A rocky summit in this range of hills.

Highest point
- Peak: Cerro Catedral (Cathedral Hill)
- Elevation: 513.66 m (1,685.2 ft)
- Coordinates: 34°22′55.9″S 54°40′27.7″W

Geography
- Location within Uruguay
- Country: Uruguay
- Range coordinates: 34°20′S 54°39′W
- Parent range: Cuchilla Grande

Geology
- Rock age: Precambrian
- Rock type(s): Granite, gneiss

Sierra Carapé or Sierra de Carapé is a hill range located in Maldonado Department, in southern Uruguay. The range crosses the Maldonado Department from west to east and enters the Rocha Department.

== Local demarcation ==
It constitutes the border between the departments of Lavalleja and Maldonado, in south-eastern Uruguay. This hill range constitutes part of a larger range named Cuchilla Grande.

== Highest point in Uruguay ==
This range has the highest point of the country, the Cerro Catedral, with 513.66 metres (1,685.24 feet) of altitude.

== See also ==
- Geography of Uruguay
- Cerro Catedral (Uruguay)#Location and geology
