= Cerro de las Ánimas =

Hill in Maldonado Department, Uruguay

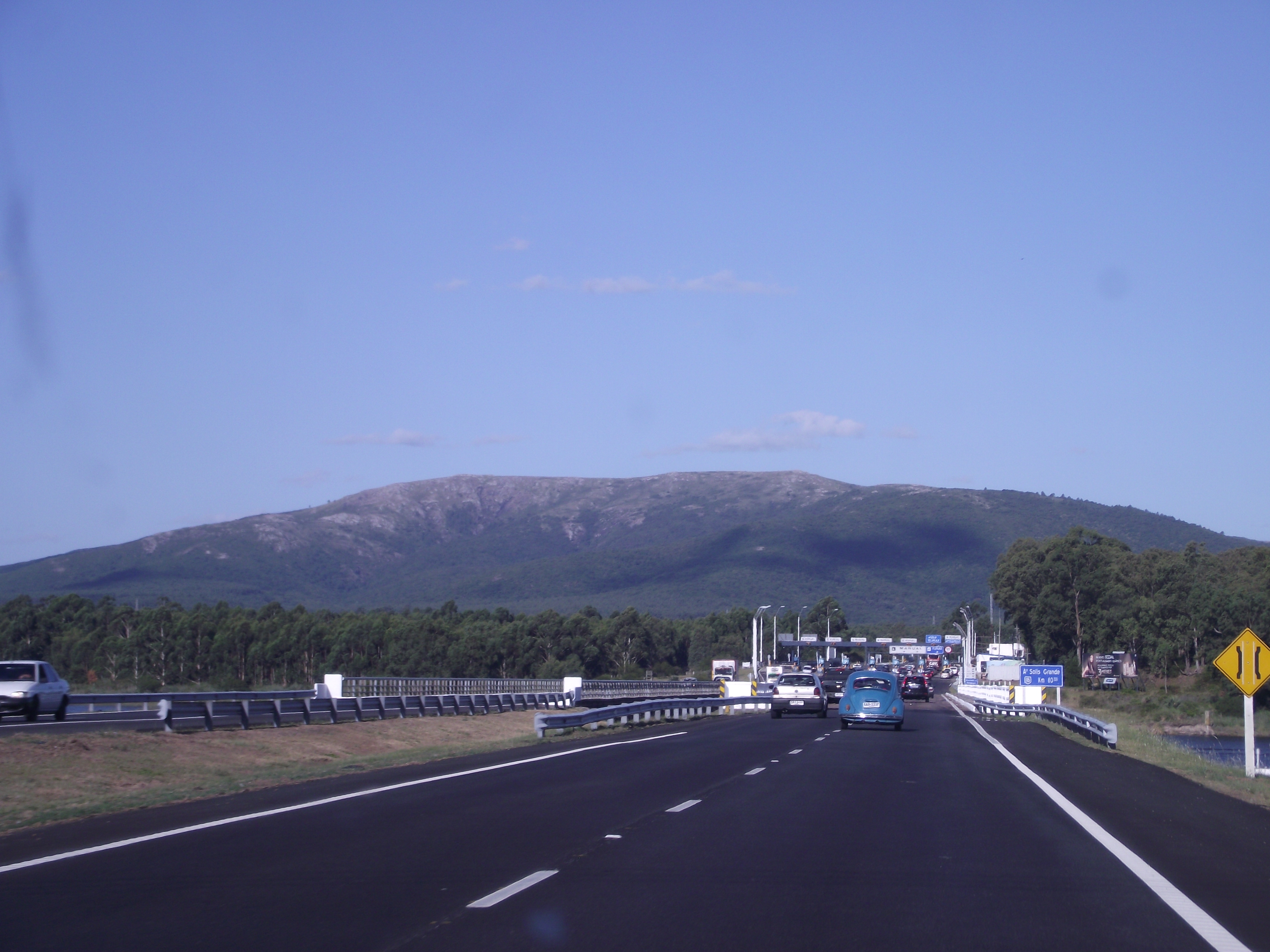
- Cerro de las Ánimas viewed from a road (Ruta Interbalnearia)

Highest point
- Elevation: 501 m (1,644 ft)
- Coordinates: 34°45′07.38″S 55°19′10.54″W

Naming
- English translation: Hill of the Souls
- Language of name: Spanish
- Pronunciation: Spanish: [ˈsero ðelaˈsanimas]

Geography
- Location within Uruguay
- Location: Piriápolis, Maldonado Department, Uruguay
- Parent range: Sierra de las Ánimas (part of Cuchilla Grande)

Geology
- Rock age: Precambrian
- Mountain type: Hill

Climbing
- Easiest route: Hike

Cerro de las Ánimas ("Hill of the Souls", formerly known as Mirador Nacional) is a peak and the second highest point of Uruguay, with an altitude of 501 metres (1,643.7 ft).

== Location and features ==
It is located to the southwest of the Maldonado Department, in the municipality of Piriápolis, in a similarly named range of hills which is named Sierra de las Ánimas.

=== Changing height calculations ===
Until 1973, this hill was considered the highest point of Uruguay.

However, in that year, a group of scientists of the Servicio Geográfico Militar (Military Geographic Service) changed the measure of the Cerro Catedral, currently considered the highest point of the country, with an altitude of 513.66 metres (1,685.24 feet).

== See also ==
- Cerro Pan de Azúcar
- Geography of Uruguay
