= Trinidad, Uruguay =

Trinidad
- Capital city
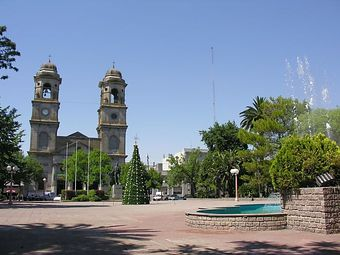
- Plaza Constitución in Trinidad

- Location in Uruguay
- Coordinates: 33°32′0″S 56°53′0″W
- Country: Uruguay
- Department: Flores
- Founded: April 14, 1804
- Founder: Fray Manuel de Ubeda

Area
  - Total: 8.27 km^{2} (3.19 sq mi)
- Elevation: 134 m (440 ft)

Population (2023 Census)
  - Total: 22,897
  - Density: 2,770/km^{2} (7,170/sq mi)
- Time zone: UTC -3
- Postal code: 85000
- Dial plan: +598 4364 (+4 digits)
- Climate: Cfa

Trinidad (Spanish pronunciation: [tɾiniˈðað]) is the capital city of Flores in southern Uruguay. It has a population of 22,893 (National Census 2023). Formerly it was called Santísima Trinidad de los Porongos, or simply Porongos. Its inhabitants are known as trinitarios or also as porongueros because the city is located near the Porongos stream.

== Geography ==
Trinidad is located in the central area of Flores department, on Cuchilla Porongos, between the Sarandí and Porongos streams and on the intersection of Route 3 with Route 14.

The stream Arroyo Sarandí, flows 4 kilometres (2.5 mi) west of the city, while the stream Arroyo Porongos flows 8 kilometres (5.0 mi) east of the city, both tributaries of the river Río Yí.

Trinidad occupies an area of 8.2 square kilometres (3.2 sq mi) on an altitude of 134 metres (440 ft) above sea level.

== History ==
Initially it was called "Porongos". Even to this day, the inhabitants of the city are referred to as either 'trinitarios' or 'porongueros'.

Porongos was founded on 18 July 1805 by General José Gervasio Artigas, the Uruguayan independence leader. It had acquired the status of "Pueblo" (village) before the Independence of Uruguay. It reached the status of "Villa" (town) under the name "Villa de Porongos". It was renamed to "Villa de la Santísima Trinidad" (Most Holy Trinity) and became capital of the newly created Department of Flores on 30 December 1885 by the Act of Ley Nº 1.854. Its naming reflects a less secular period in the country's history.

In July 1903 it was renamed "Trinidad" and its status was elevated to "Ciudad" (city) by the Act of Ley Nº 2.829.

== Population ==
In 2023, Trinidad had a population of 22,893. This makes Trinidad the largest city by far in the department of Flores.

Year	Population
1908	8,317
1963	15,455
1975	17,597
1985	18,372
1996	20,031
2004	20,982
2011	21,429
2023	22,893

Source: Instituto Nacional de Estadística de Uruguay

== Tourism ==
A nature reserve with a variety of flora and fauna is situated 3.5 kilometres (2.2 mi) west of the city, on Route 3.

Nearby there are interesting prehistoric sites to visit: the Palace Cave and the rock paintings at Chamangá.

== Places of worship ==
- Most Holy Trinity Parish Church (Roman Catholic)
- Our Lady of Luján Parish Church (Roman Catholic)

== Politics ==
Following a sizeable meeting in Trinidad in 2007, the 'Vamos Uruguay' grouping within the Colorado Party was founded by Pedro Bordaberry Herrán, the front-running presidential candidate of the Colorados for 2009. Following these beginnings in Trinidad, local chapters of the organization were subsequently established in many departments of Uruguay.

== Notable people ==
- Pedro Listur (1922–2004), high jumper
- Chory Castro (born 1984), football player
- Noelia Etcheverry (born 1986), television presenter

== See also ==
- Porongos River#Name
- Flores Department#Fauna
- es:Arroyo Porongos
- es:Categoría:Poronguero
