= Rosario River =

Rosario River may refer to:

- Rosario River (Argentina)
- Rosario River (Uruguay)
- Jatun Mayu (Linares), also called Rosario, a river in Bolivia
