= Ismael Cortinas =

- Town
- Location in Uruguay
- Coordinates: 33°57′40″S 57°5′19″W
- Country: Uruguay
- Department: Flores Department

Population (2011)
  - Total: 918
- Time zone: UTC -3
- Postal code: 85001
- Dial plan: +598 4539 (+4 digits)

Ismael Cortinas is a town in the Flores Department of Uruguay.

== Geography ==
The town is located on the junction of Route 23 with Route 12, at southwest edge of the department and borders the departments of Soriano, Colonia and San José. The Grande River (Uruguay) (Spanish: Arroyo Grande) runs near the town.

== History ==
It was declared "Pueblo" (village) on 18 October 1950 by the Act of Ley N° 11.607, and named after Ismael Cortinas, a Deputy, Senator, journalist and playwright. Its status was elevated to "Villa" (town) on 15 November 1963 by the Act of Ley N° 13.167.

== Population ==
In 2011 Ismael Cortinas had a population of 918.

Year	Population
1908	1.404
1963	558
1975	580
1985	938
1996	1,036
2004	1,069
2011	918

Source: Instituto Nacional de Estadística de Uruguay

== Places of worship ==
- St. John the Baptist Chapel (Roman Catholic)

== See also ==
- Geography of Uruguay
