= Rosario River (Uruguay) =

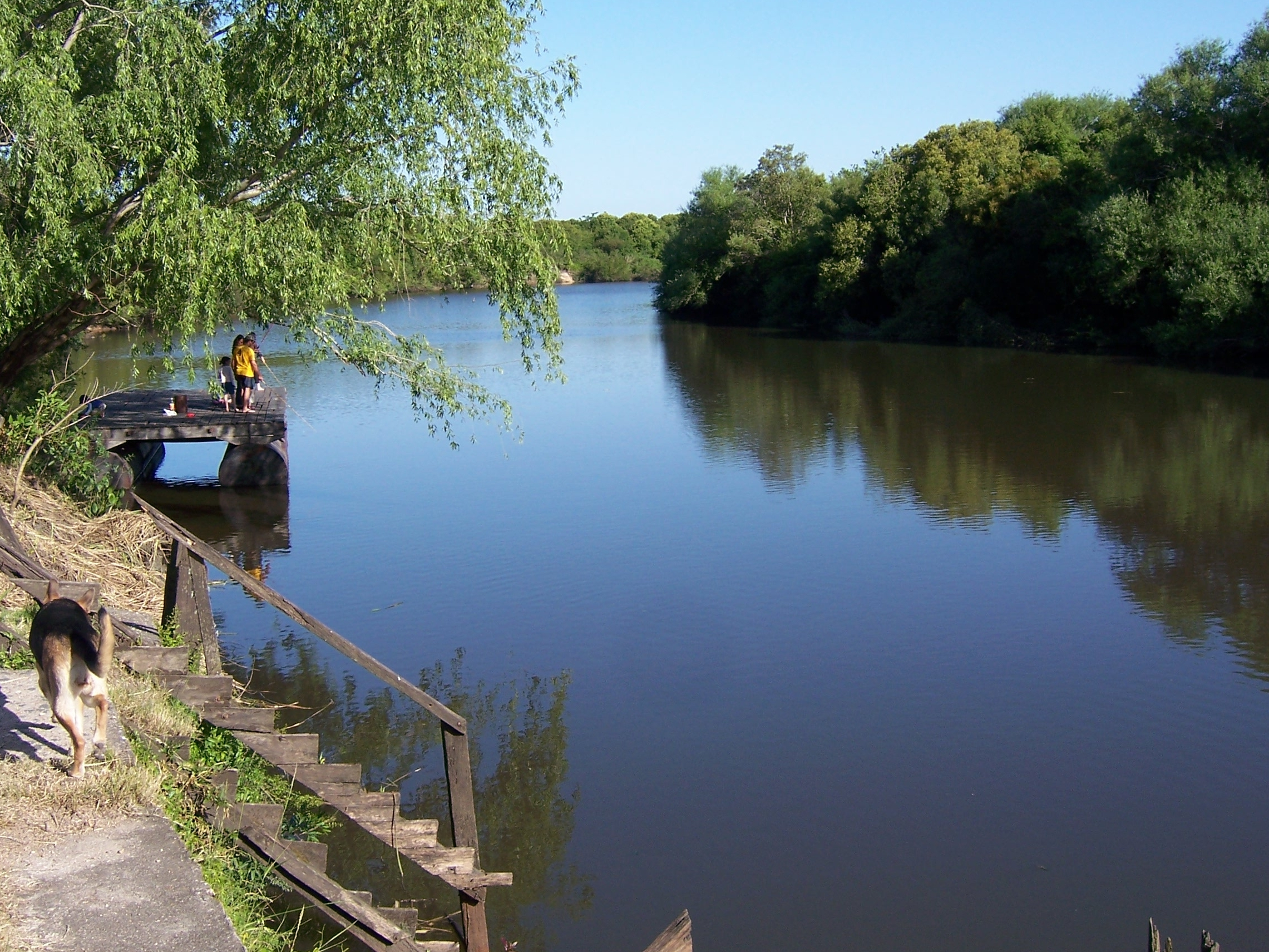
- View of Rosario River

Location
- Country: Uruguay

Physical characteristics
- Source
  - location: Cuchilla Grande Inferior
- Mouth: Rio de la Plata
  - coordinates: 34°26′00″S 57°21′02″W
- Length: 80 km (50 mi)
- Basin size: 1,745 km^{2} (674 sq mi)

The Rosario River (Spanish: Río Rosario) is a river located in the Colonia Department of Uruguay. Its originates in Cuchilla Grande Inferior, near the limit with the departments of San José, Flores, and Soriano, and flows into the Río de la Plata.
