= Cerro Catedral (Uruguay) =

Hill in Uruguay

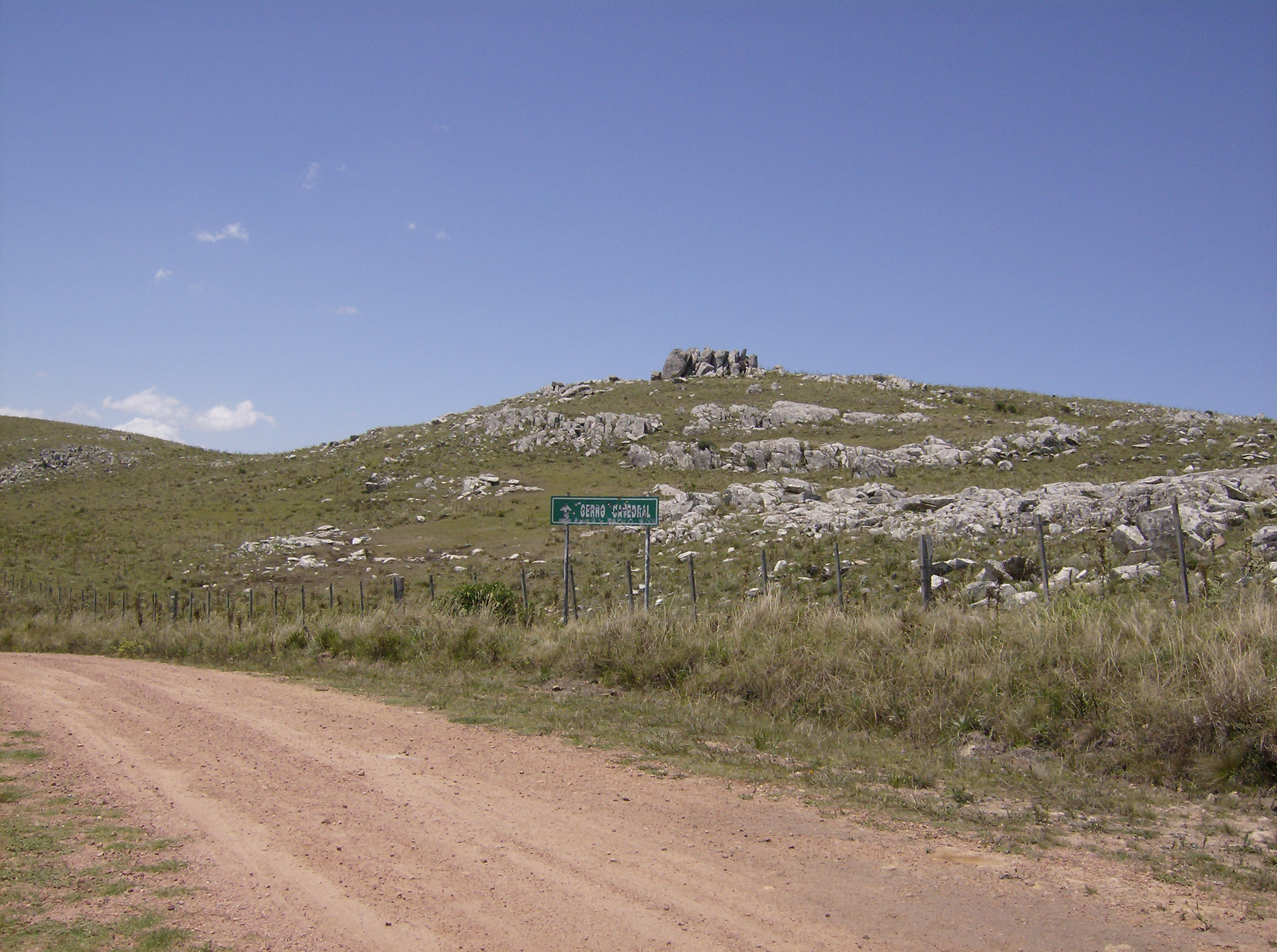
- The summit of Cerro Catedral, near a dirt road (Ruta 109).

Highest point
- Elevation: 513.66 m (1,685.2 ft)
- Prominence: 373 m (1,224 ft)
- Listing: Country high point
- Coordinates: 34°22′55.9″S 54°40′27.7″W

Naming
- English translation: Cathedral Hill
- Language of name: Spanish
- Pronunciation: Spanish: [ˈsero kateˈðɾal]

Geography
- Location within Uruguay
- Location: Aiguá, Maldonado Department, Uruguay
- Parent range: Sierra Carapé (part of Cuchilla Grande)

Geology
- Rock age: Precambrian
- Mountain type(s): Hill (granite, gneiss)

Climbing
- First ascent: Unknown
- Easiest route: Hike

Cerro Catedral ("Cathedral Hill"), also known as Cerro Cordillera, is a peak and the highest point of Uruguay, with an altitude of 513.66 m (1,685.2 ft). It is located north of Maldonado Department, in the municipality of Aiguá, in a hill range named Sierra Carapé, which constitutes part of a larger range named Cuchilla Grande. Its name derived from the curious forms of the rocky elevations of its summit, which are very common in the southern part of this country.

== History ==
Until 1973, Cerro de las Ánimas (formerly known as Mirador Nacional), with an elevation of 501 m (1,644 ft), was considered the highest point of Uruguay. However, in that year, a group of scientists of the Servicio Geográfico Militar (Military Geographic Service) changed the measure of Cerro Catedral.

== Geography ==
=== Location and geology ===
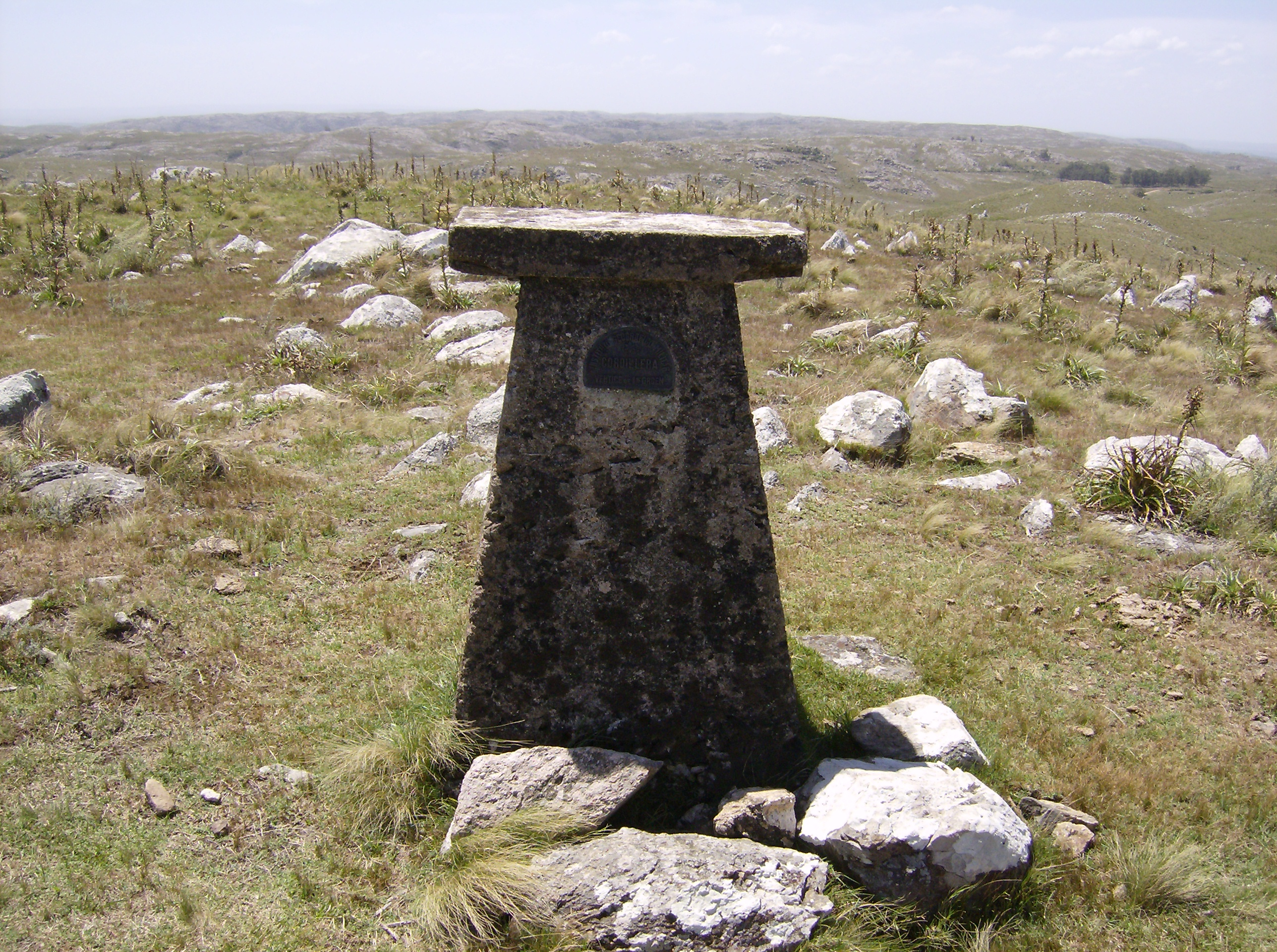
A geodetic mark that indicates the summit

Sierra Carapé, formed in Precambrian time, crosses the Maldonado Department from west to east and enters the Rocha Department. It constitutes the border between the departments of Lavalleja and Maldonado. Cerro Catedral, or Cerro Cordillera, is situated in the region of Las Cañas, in the 8th Judicial Section and the 9th Police Section of the Maldonado Department. Near Cerro Catedral there are the source of José Ignacio Stream (Arroyo José Ignacio), which runs from north to south, and the source of Coronilla Stream (Arroyo Coronilla), running to the northwest, which drains into Aiguá.

The hill is situated in an area of the range which its formation is mainly granitic and gneissic.

=== Vegetation ===
In the highest areas of Cerro Catedral, the vegetation practically does not exist, with the sparse appearance of a shrub called Myrtus ugni between the rocks. Above the altitude of 400 m (1,300 ft), tough grasses, xerophile vegetation, Baccharis articulata and marcela predominate.

=== Climate ===
The climate in this locality is oceanic (described by the Köppen climate classification as Cfb), with mild to warm summers and chilly to cool winters (with frequent frosts). Strong winds are a common occurrence. The precipitation is evenly distributed throughout the year and snowfalls are uncommon. The last episode of snow in the place occurred on June 23, 2025.

Climate data for Cerro Catedral (514 metres - modelled data)
Month	Jan	Feb	Mar	Apr	May	Jun	Jul	Aug	Sep	Oct	Nov	Dec	Year
Mean daily maximum °C (°F)	26 (79)	25 (77)	23 (73)	19 (66)	16 (61)	14 (57)	13 (55)	15 (59)	16 (61)	19 (66)	21 (70)	24 (75)	19 (67)
Mean daily minimum °C (°F)	14 (57)	14 (57)	13 (55)	10 (50)	7 (45)	5 (41)	4 (39)	5 (41)	6 (43)	8 (46)	10 (50)	12 (54)	9 (48)
Average precipitation mm (inches)	69 (2.7)	101 (4.0)	98 (3.9)	93 (3.7)	83 (3.3)	74 (2.9)	82 (3.2)	70 (2.8)	74 (2.9)	102 (4.0)	103 (4.1)	77 (3.0)	1,026 (40.5)
Source: MeteoBlue

== See also ==
- Cerro Pan de Azúcar
- Geography of Uruguay

== Sources ==
- (in Spanish) Cerro Catedral, Site of the Municipality of Maldonado, Uruguay.
