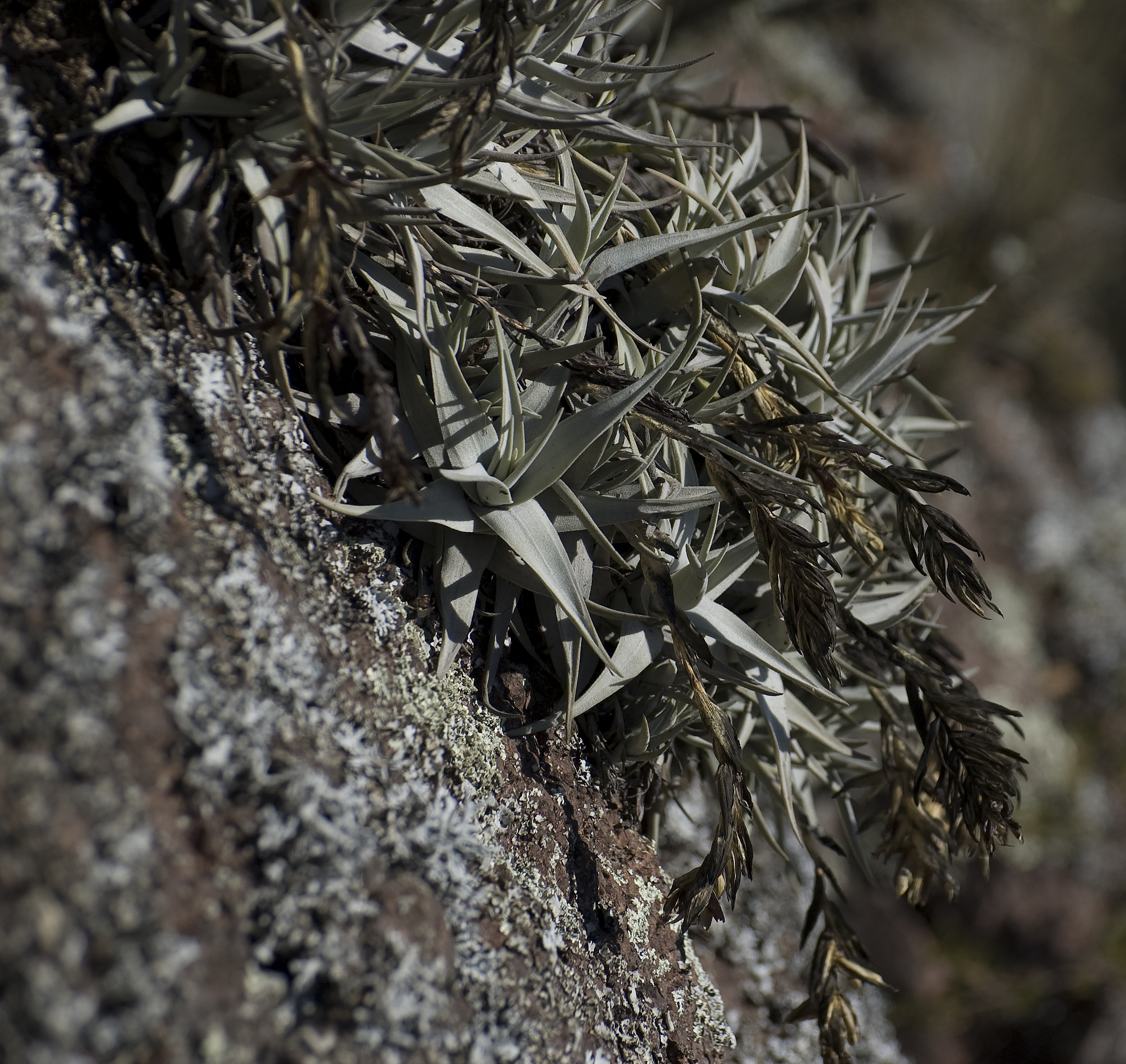
- Tillandsia arequitae above Riolita in Cerro Arequita, department of Lavelleja, Uruguay. The species is endemic in Uriguay.

Scientific classification
- Kingdom: Plantae
- Clade: Embryophytes
- Clade: Tracheophytes
- Clade: Spermatophytes
- Clade: Angiosperms
- Clade: Monocots
- Clade: Commelinids
- Order: Poales
- Family: Bromeliaceae
- Genus: Tillandsia
- Subgenus: Tillandsia subg. Aerobia
- Species: T. arequitae

Binomial name
- Tillandsia arequitae (André) André ex Mez

Synonyms
- Tillandsia xiphioides var. arequitae André

= Tillandsia arequitae =

Species of plant

Tillandsia arequitae is a species of flowering plant in the Bromeliaceae family. It is native to Brazil and Uruguay, its specific epithet referring to Cerro Arequita, Lavalleja Department in Uruguay.

== Taxonomy ==
=== Cultivars ===
Recognized cultivars include:

- Tillandsia 'Mystic Rainbow'
- Tillandsia 'Mystic Rainbow Peach'
- Tillandsia 'Mystic Rainbow Pink'
