= Yí River =

Coordinates: 33°6′50″S 57°6′46″W

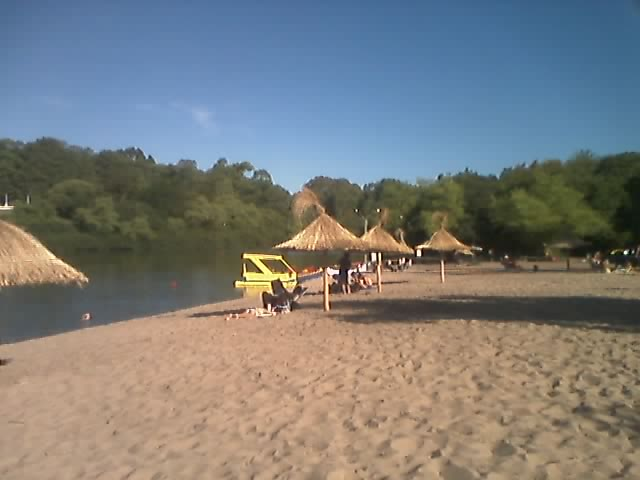

Location
- Country: Uruguay

Physical characteristics
- Source
  - location: Cuchilla Grande highlands
- Mouth
  - location: Río Negro (Uruguay)
- Length: 210 kilometres (130 mi)

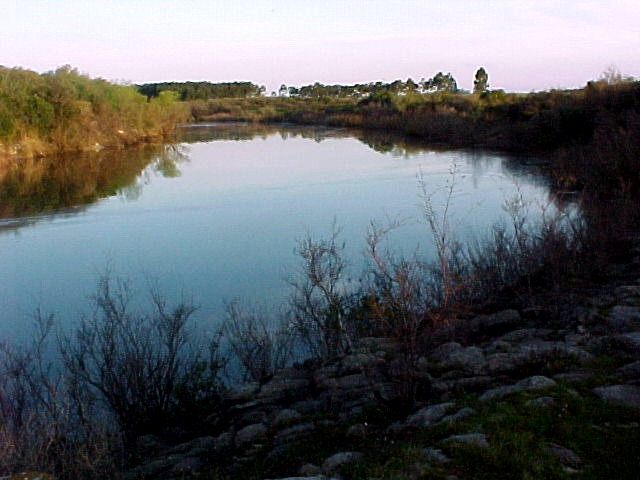
The Yí River

The Yí River (Spanish, Río Yí) is a river in Uruguay. The Yí and the Tacuarembó Rivers are the principal tributaries of the Río Negro.

== Geography ==
The Yí River originates in the Cuchilla Grande highlands. It flows generally west through central Uruguay to the Río Negro.

Various other rivers, including the Porongos River and Chamangá River, are tributaries of the Yí River.

=== Departmental boundaries ===
The Yí forms much of the boundary between Durazno Department and Florida Department.

Subsequently, it forms part of the boundary between Durazno Department and Flores Department, where the Chamangá River its tributary.

== See also ==
- Geography of Uruguay#Topography and hydrography
- Porongos River#Fluvial system
- Chamangá River#Fluvial system
