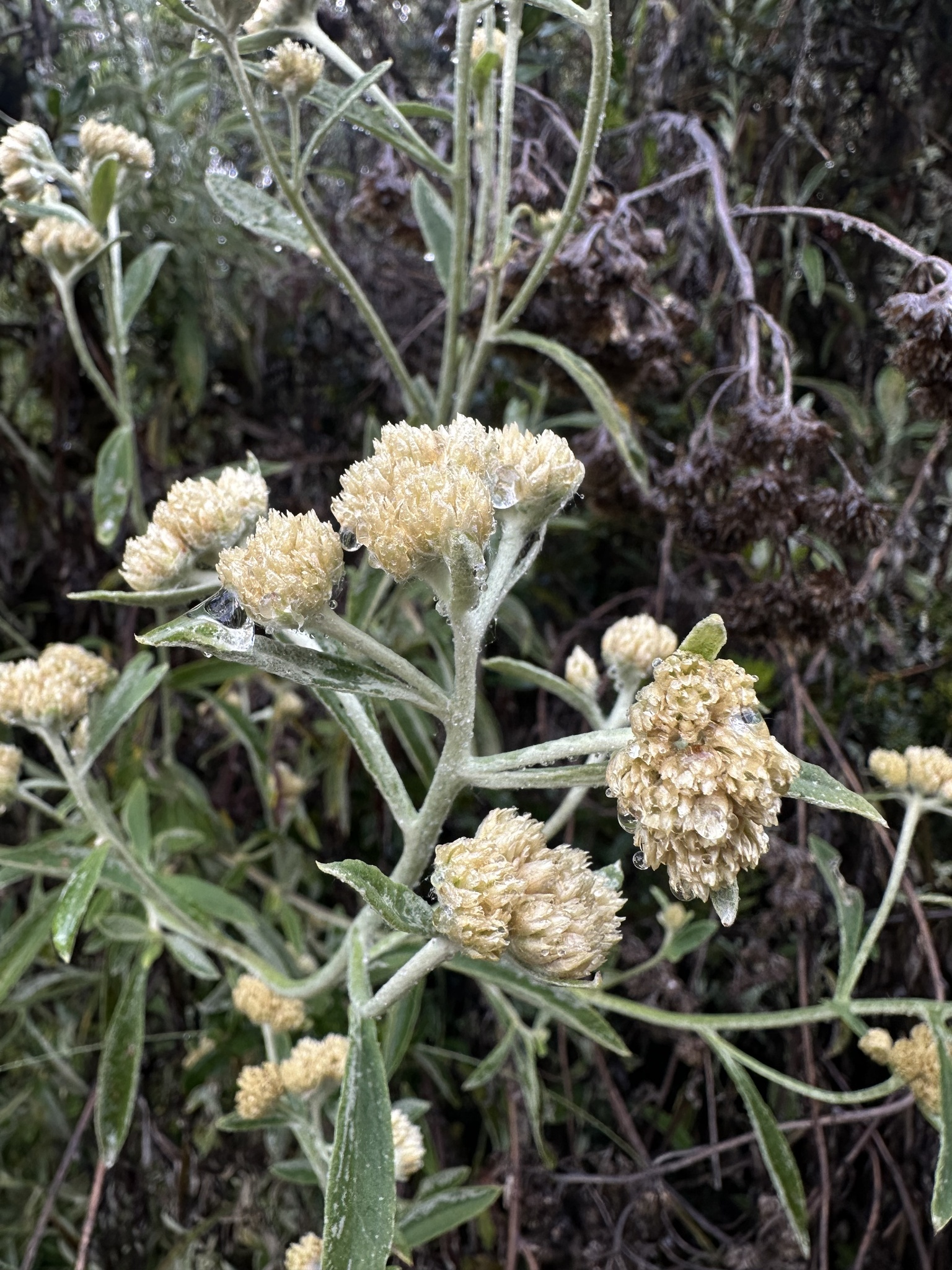

Conservation status
- Critically Endangered (IUCN 3.1)

Scientific classification
- Kingdom: Plantae
- Clade: Tracheophytes
- Clade: Angiosperms
- Clade: Eudicots
- Clade: Asterids
- Order: Asterales
- Family: Asteraceae
- Genus: Achyrocline
- Species: A. mollis

Binomial name
- Achyrocline mollis Benth.

= Achyrocline mollis =

Species of flowering plant

Achyrocline mollis is a species of flowering plant in the Gnaphaliae tribe of the family Asteraceae. It is found only in Ecuador, Colombia and possibly Perú. Its natural habitat is subtropical or tropical moist montane forests. It is threatened by habitat loss.
