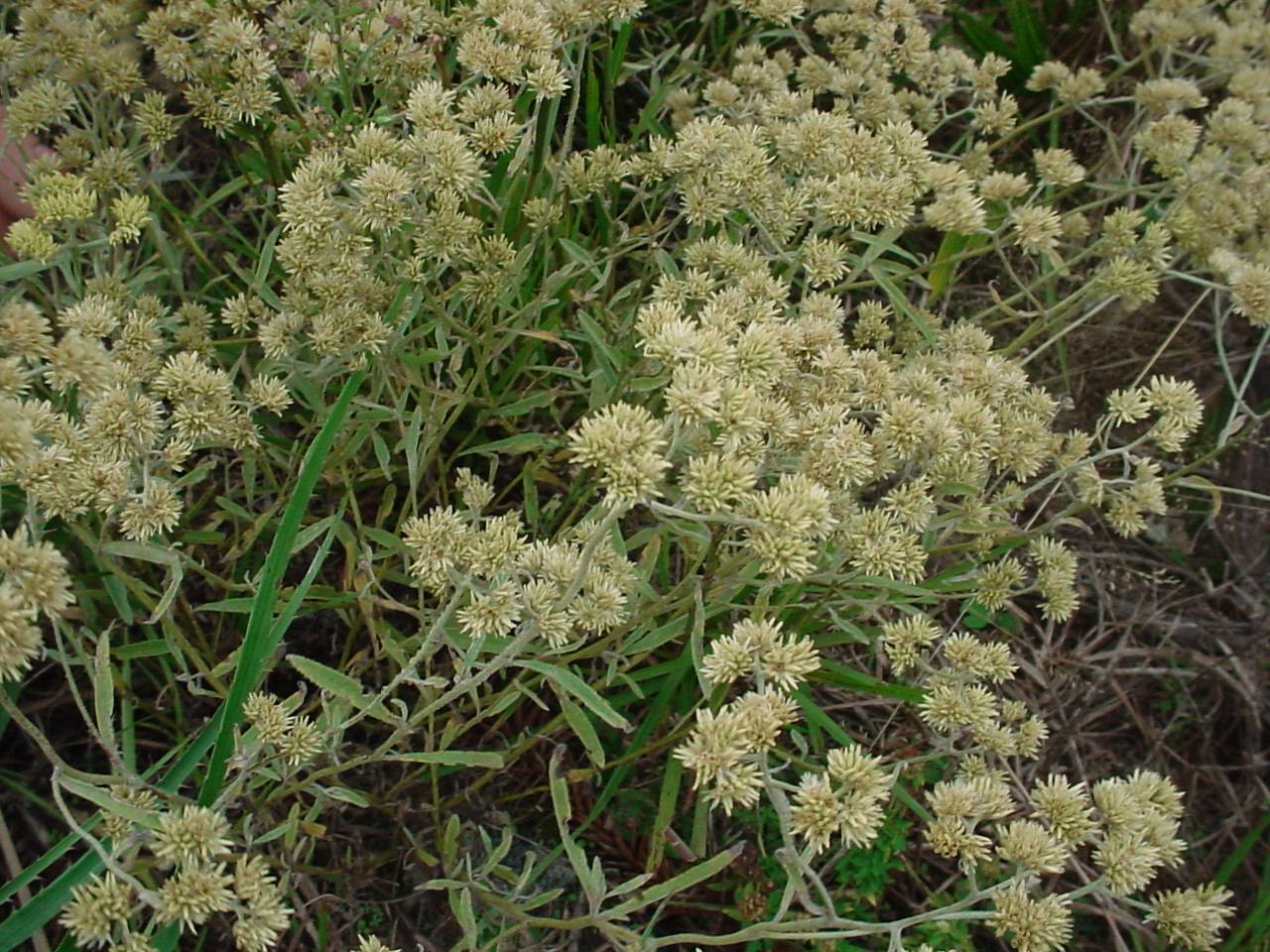

Scientific classification
- Kingdom: Plantae
- Clade: Tracheophytes
- Clade: Angiosperms
- Clade: Eudicots
- Clade: Asterids
- Order: Asterales
- Family: Asteraceae
- Subfamily: Asteroideae
- Tribe: Gnaphalieae
- Genus: Achyrocline (Less.) DC.

Synonyms
- Gnaphalium subgenus Achyrocline Less.

= Achyrocline =

Genus of flowering plants

Achyrocline is a genus of flowering plants in the Asteraceae described as a genus in 1838. It is native to Latin America and Africa.

Species

- Achyrocline alata
- Achyrocline albicans
- Achyrocline anabelae
- Achyrocline arrojadoana
- Achyrocline bogotensis
- Achyrocline brittoniana
- Achyrocline candicans
- Achyrocline celosioides
- Achyrocline coquimbense
- Achyrocline crassiceps
- Achyrocline crassiuscula
- Achyrocline deflexa
- Achyrocline disjuncta
- Achyrocline flaccida
- Achyrocline flavida
- Achyrocline gardnerii
- Achyrocline gaudens
- Achyrocline gertiana
- Achyrocline glandulosa
- Achyrocline guerreroana
- Achyrocline hallii
- Achyrocline hirta
- Achyrocline hyperchlora
- Achyrocline latifolia
- Achyrocline lehmannii
- Achyrocline luisiana
- Achyrocline macella
- Achyrocline marchiorii
- Achyrocline mathiolifolia
- Achyrocline mollis
- Achyrocline moritzianum
- Achyrocline oaxacana
- Achyrocline peruviana
- Achyrocline ramosissima
- Achyrocline ribasiana
- Achyrocline rupestris
- Achyrocline satureioides
- Achyrocline scandens
- Achyrocline tombadorensis
- Achyrocline tomentosa
- Achyrocline trianae
- Achyrocline turneri
- Achyrocline venosa
- Achyrocline ventosa
- Achyrocline virescens
