= Palace Cave =

- Gruta del Palacio
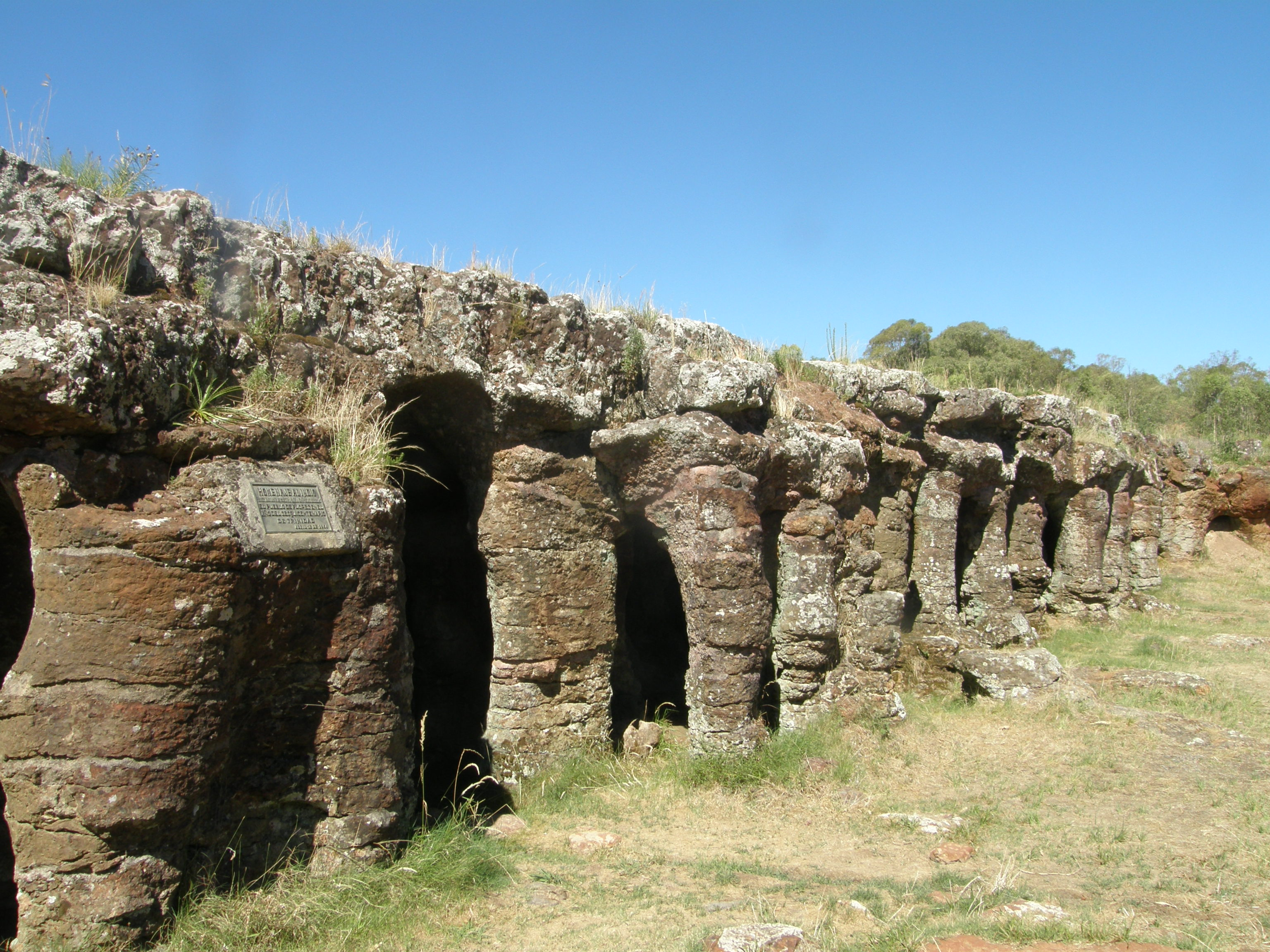
- Access to the Palace Cave

- Location within Uruguay
- Location: Trinidad, Flores Department
- Coordinates: 33°16′34″S 57°08′00″W
- Discovery: 1877
- Geology: Late Cretaceous sandstone

The Palace Cave (Spanish: Gruta del Palacio) is located at Flores Department, not far away from Trinidad, Uruguay.

== History ==
The rocks in which the cave is formed date to the Late Cretaceous and is composed of sandstone, which ferrified during the Paleocene.

It was first studied in 1877; in the early 20th century, it was explored by Dr. Karl Walter.

The cave has been subject of the creation of a geopark. UNESCO is considering it as a possible World Heritage Site, due to its interest as a Geopark.

The Palace Cave is featured in the coat of arms of Flores Department.
