= Localidad Rupestre de Chamangá =

Archaeological site in Uruguay

Coordinates: 33°33′16″S 56°34′22″W

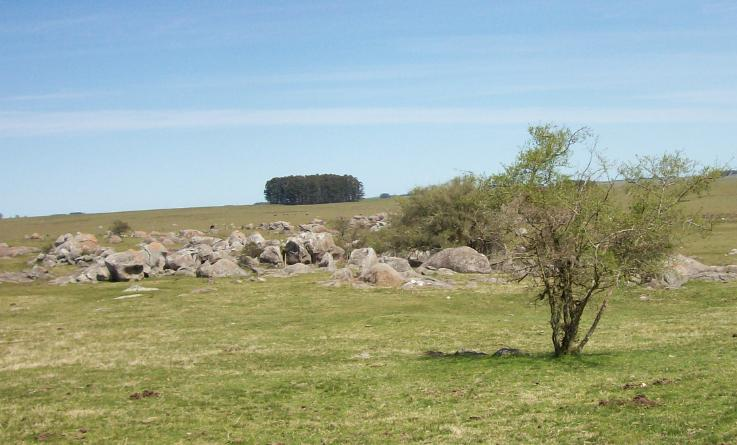
Chamangá.

The Chamangá Rock Art Place (Spanish: Localidad Rupestre de Chamangá) is a concentration of rock painting located at Chamangá to the east of Trinidad, Uruguay.

== See also ==
- Chamangá
