= Danilo Pallares Echeverría =

Uruguayan writer and musician

Danilo Pallares Echeverría is a Uruguayan writer and musician who wrote the anthem Himno a Flores ("Flores Hymn").

== See also ==
- Music of Uruguay
- List of Uruguayan writers
- Flores Department#Notable people
