= Cerro Arequita =

Hill in Lavalleja Department, Uruguay

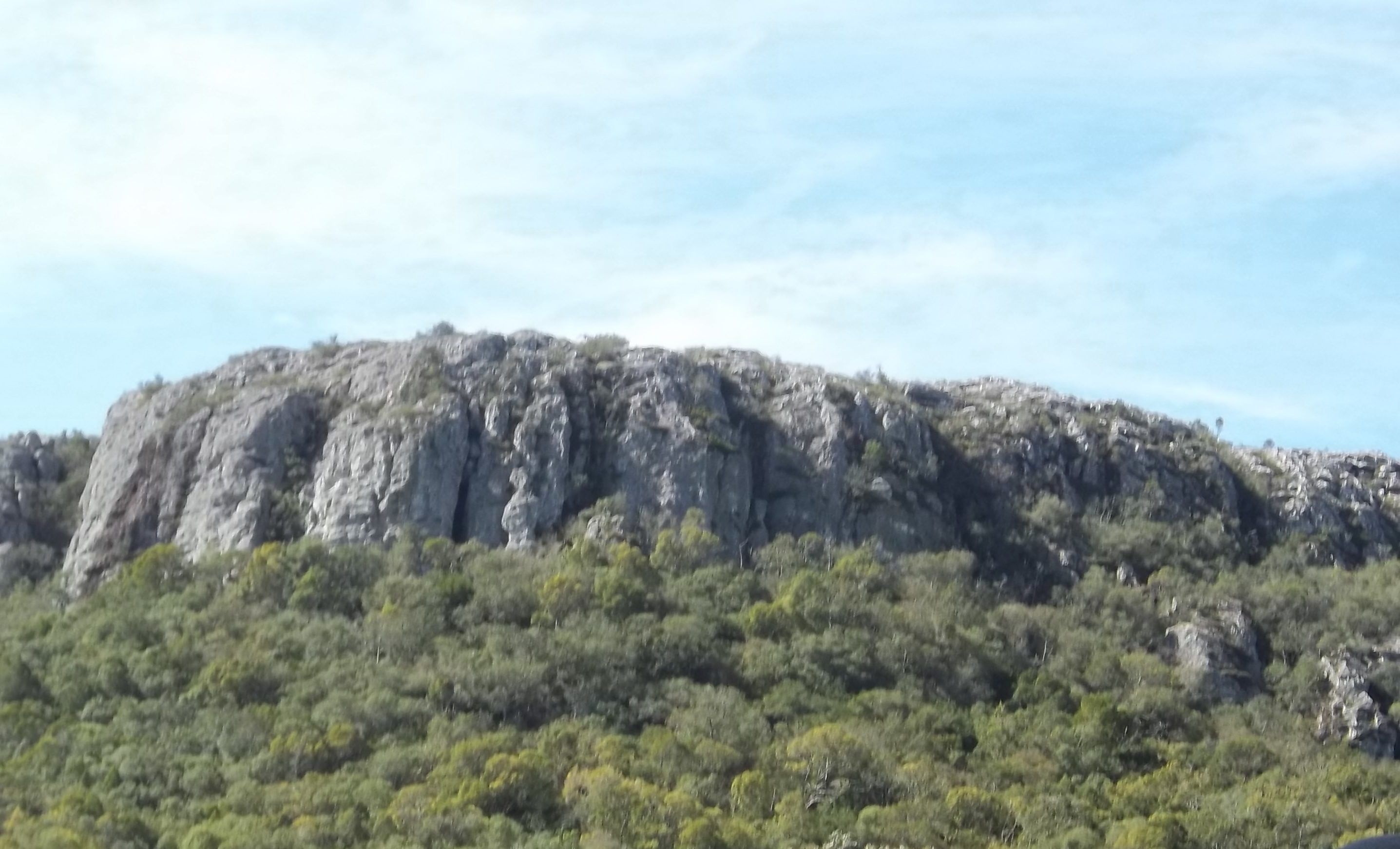
- Cerro Arequita ca. 2011.

Highest point
- Elevation: 305 m (1,001 ft)
- Coordinates: 34°17′27″S 55°16′01″W

Naming
- English translation: Cerro (Hill in Spanish); Arequita (Water falling from the high rock over the caves in Guarani)
- Language of name: Spanish/Guarani

Geography
- Location within Uruguay
- Location: 10 km north of Minas, Lavalleja Department, Uruguay
- Parent range: Cuchilla Grande

Geology
- Mountain type: Hill

Climbing
- Easiest route: Hike

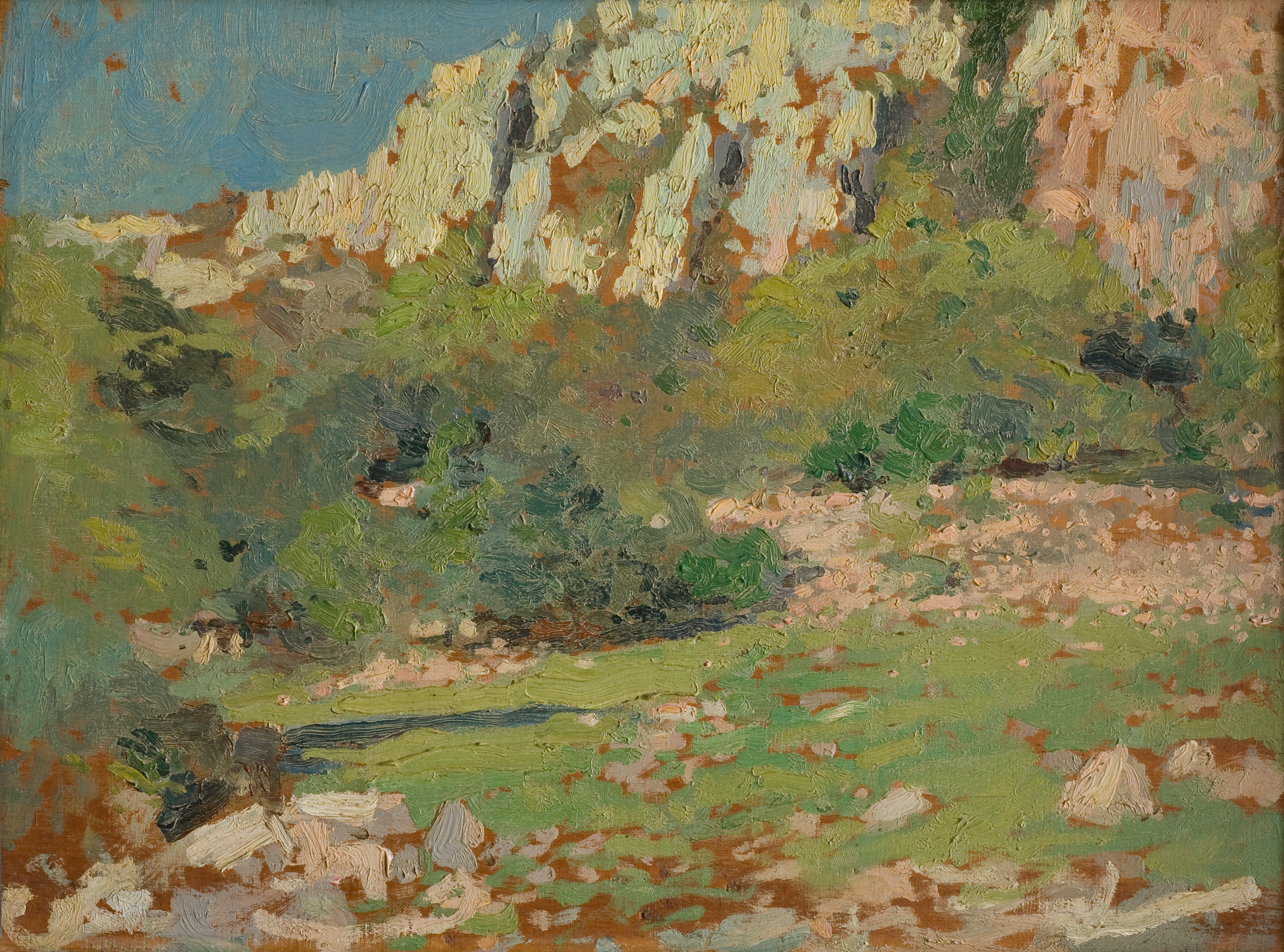
Cerro Arequita, oil painting by Carlos Federico Sáez, 1899.

Cerro Arequita is a hill located in Lavalleja Department, Uruguay.

== Overview ==
Its name is of Guarani origin, meaning "water falling from the high rock over the caves".

Since 2024 it is part of the National Park of Arequita, a nature sanctuary full of native species: armadillos, skunks, foxes, Geoffroy's cats, gray brockets, capybaras, river otters, nutrias, bats, chingolos, chalk-browed mockingbirds, dusky-legged guans, turkey vultures, savannah vultures.

An endemic epiphyte flowering plant species is Tillandsia arequitae.

== In art ==
- Carlos Federico Sáez painted this hill in 1899.
- The Cerro Arequita is featured on both the coat of arms and the flag of Lavalleja Department.

== Bibliography ==
- Araújo, Orestes (2012). Diccionario geográfico del Uruguay (in Spanish). Montevideo.
