= Himno a Flores =

Himno a Flores ('Flores hymn') is the departmental anthem of Flores, an administrative division of Uruguay. The music and lyrics were written by Danilo Pallares Echeverría.

== Cultural note ==
Uruguay is notable because many of its departments have also adopted their own anthems aside from the national one in an effort to promote civic identity and responsibility.

== Description ==
The anthem consists of three stanzas. The first two stanzas consist of eight lines while the third stanza is of nine lines. It celebrates the beauty of Flores and the achievements of its people. These are linked to the patriotic values of Uruguay and universal values of humanity evoked as being encapsulated in Flores.

== See also ==
- Music of Uruguay
- National Anthem of Uruguay
