= Carlos Federico Sáez =

Uruguayan artist

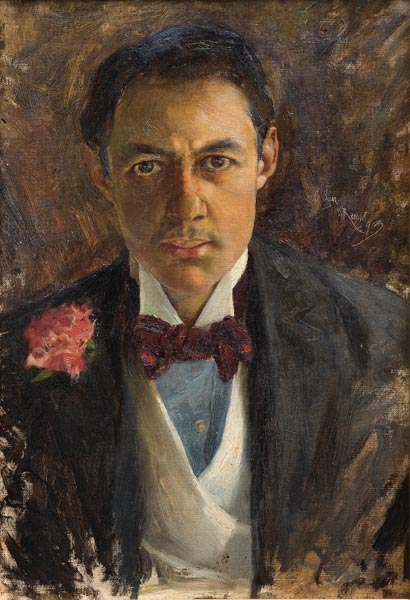
- Self-portrait
- Born: Carlos Federico Sáez; November 14, 1878; Mercedes, Uruguay
- Died: January 4, 1901 (aged 22); Montevideo, Uruguay
- Education: Academy of Fine Arts, Rome
- Known for: Painting, Portraiture
- Notable work: Portrait of J.C.M. (c.1899)
- Style: Macchiaioli, Art Nouveau

Carlos Federico Sáez (14 November 1878, Mercedes – 4 January 1901, Montevideo) was an artist from Uruguay.

== Biography ==
He was born into a wealthy family in the city of Mercedes in western Uruguay. By the age of 13 he was producing outstanding paintings and drawings. In 1891 he moved to Montevideo to study with the painter Juan Franzi.

The well-known painter Juan Manuel Blanes recommended that Sáez go to study in Italy, which was a fairly common practice for wealthy young artists in Uruguay at that time. The national government provided him with an art scholarship at just 14 years of age. He spent the next seven years in Rome. He entered the Academy of Fine Arts in 1893, but was interested in new artistic movements such as the Macchiaioli and Art Nouveau. In 1896 he set up his own atelier in the Via Margutta, offering a number of shows.

In 1900 he fell ill and returned to Montevideo where he died shortly after at the age of 22.

== Works ==
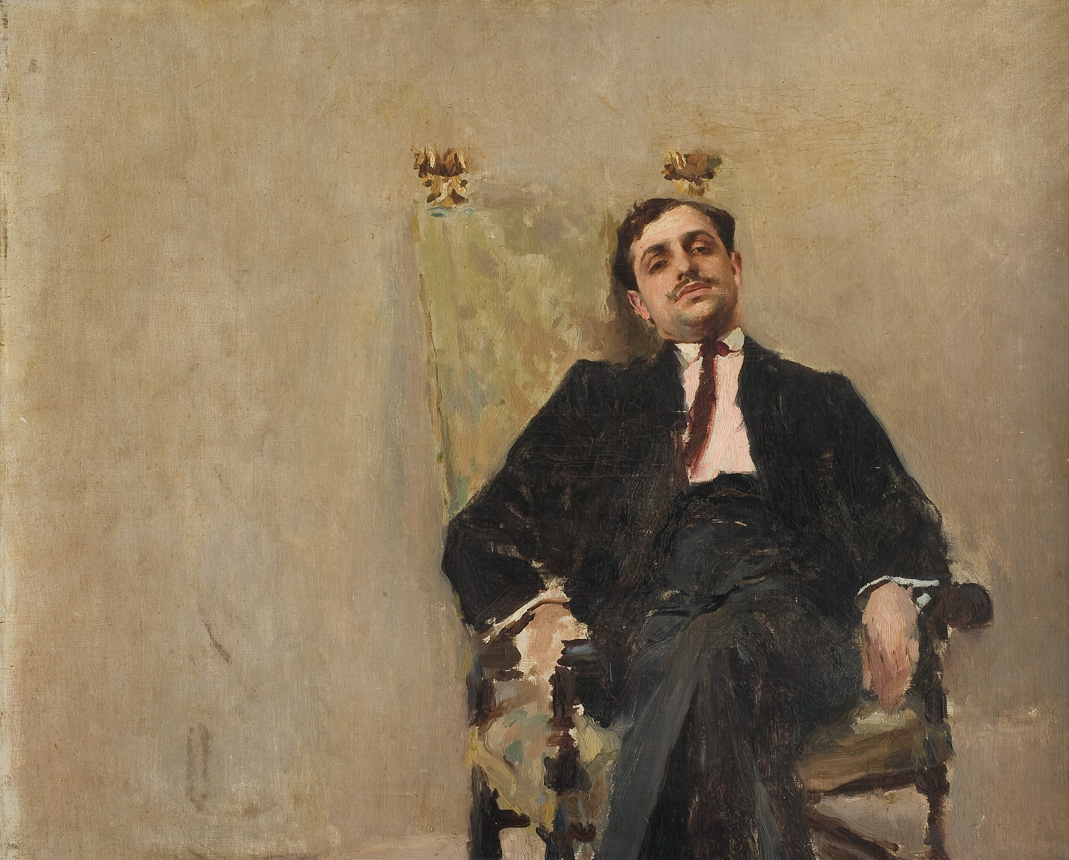
Portrait of J.C.M. (c.1899)

Sáez painted mainly portraits. His work is characterized by loose brush strokes that still convey a realistic precision. While he was in Italy he painted a number of portraits where the canvas is left visible – a technique used in abstract art, and which was not seen elsewhere until 1910.

In his short career he produced more than 70 oil paintings and 100 drawings. He is considered one of the principal Uruguayan artists and the first to produce truly modern art.

His works can be found in Uruguay in the National Museum of Visual Arts and the Juan Manuel Blanes Museum both in Montevideo, the Pinacoteca Eusebio Giménez Gallery in his home town of Mercedes, and in the Latin American Art Museum of Buenos Aires known as the MALBA.
