= Cerro Pan de Azúcar =

Mountain in Maldonado Department, Uruguay

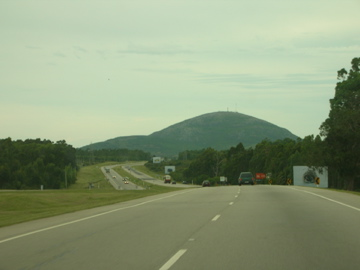
- The hill viewed from a road

Highest point
- Elevation: 423 m (1,388 ft)
- Coordinates: 34°48′33″S 55°15′31″W

Naming
- English translation: 'Sugar Loaf Hill'
- Language of name: Spanish
- Pronunciation: Latin American Spanish: [ˈsero ˈpan de aˈsukaɾ]

Geography
- Location within Uruguay
- Location: Piriápolis, Maldonado Department, Uruguay
- Parent range: Cuchilla Grande

Geology
- Rock age: Precambrian
- Mountain type(s): Hill (granite, gneiss)

Climbing
- Easiest route: Hike

Cerro Pan de Azúcar ('Sugar Loaf Hill') is among the top 10 highest points of Uruguay, with an altitude of 423 metres (1,387.8 ft).

== Location and features ==
It is located southwest of Maldonado Department, in the municipality of Piriápolis, in a range of hills named Cuchilla Grande.

At the eastern feet of the hill and partly on its side, is the Reserva de Flora y Fauna del Pan de Azúcar, a nature reserve. On its summit, there is a cross made of cement, with a height of 35 metres (114.8 feet), visible from a considerable distance. The cross is visitable inside with a spiral staircase leading to the horizontal part of the cross, which offers view of the area through small openings.

== History ==
In 1890 Don Francisco Piria, founder of the resort of Piriápolis, had bought a big stretch of land including the Cerro Pan de Azúcar and stretching all the way to the beach. The hill was rich in granite and by his decision one of its slopes became a quarry which provided solid granite rocks for the construction of the seaside resort, and which gave work to more than 500 workers.

In 1933 the famous sculptor José Luis Zorrilla de San Martín together with father Engels Walters constructed a 35-metre cross on its top. In 1980 a nature conservation and breeding centre for animals threatened by extinction was founded on its east side.

== Images ==
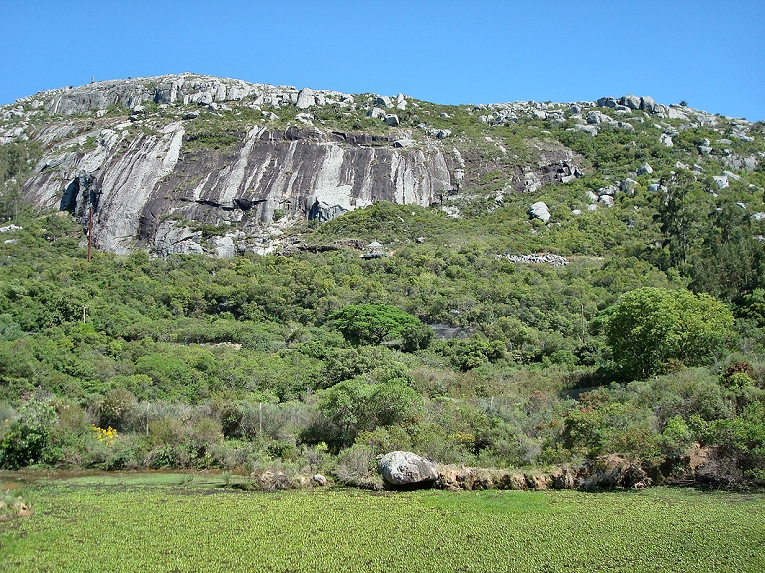
Cerro Pan de Azúcar seen from the Nature Reserve.

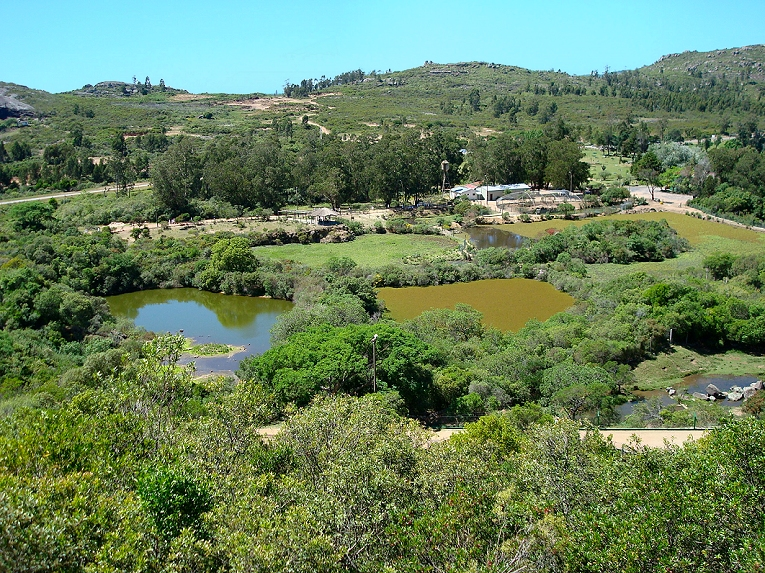
The Nature Reserve seen from the hill.

== See also ==
- Cerro Catedral
- Cerro de las Ánimas
- Geography of Uruguay
