= Chamangá =

- Location in Uruguay
- Coordinates: 33°40′00″S 56°35′00″W
- Country: Uruguay
- Department: Flores Department

Chamangá is an area within a rocky terrain in the Flores Department of Uruguay, where a considerable quantity of ancient rock art has survived.

The Chamangá River, a tributary of the Yí River, flows nearby.

== History ==
In recent years there has been some considerable interest in these examples of rock art, both by the Uruguayan government and by academic researchers.

== Notable people related to this area ==
- Raul Sendic, founder of the Tupamaros, Uruguayan urban guerrillas of the 1960s and 1970s, was born at Chamangá.
