= Cuchilla Grande Inferior =

Mountain range in Uruguay

- Location within Uruguay

Highest point
- Elevation: 351 m (1,152 ft)
- Coordinates: 33°40′0″S 56°30′0″W

Geography
- Country: Uruguay

Geology
- Rock age: Precambrian
- Rock type(s): Granite, gneiss

Cuchilla Grande Inferior is a hill range in Uruguay that constitutes part of a larger range named Cuchilla Grande.

It is located in the south of the country in the Departments of Florida, Flores, Soriano and north of San José and Colonia. Cuchilla Grande Inferior stretches east–west approximately from Alejandro Gallinal to Cardona, in a distance of approximately 190 kilometres (120 mi).
