= Cuchilla Grande =

Hill range in Uruguay

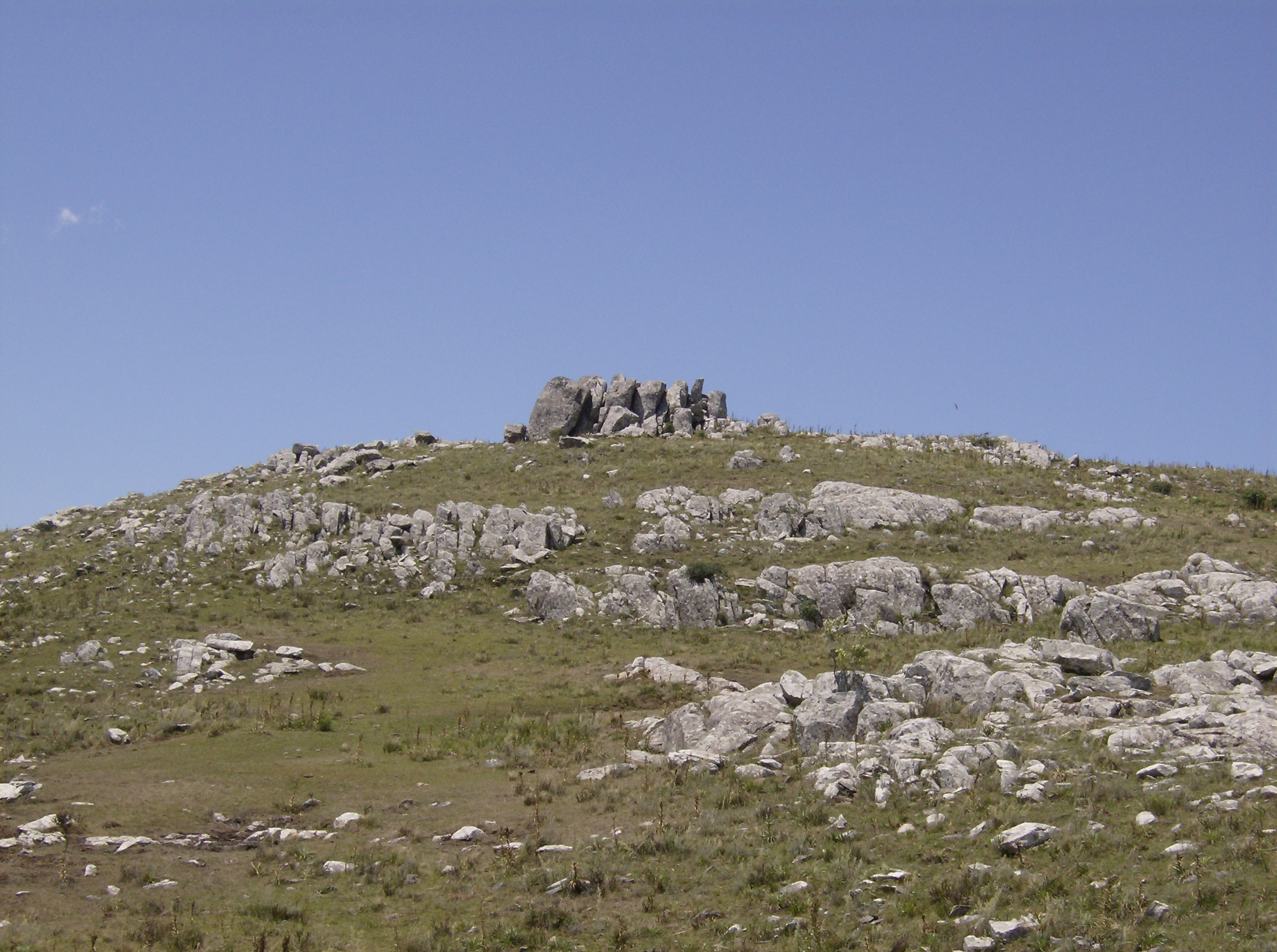
- Cerro Catedral, the highest point in Uruguay

Highest point
- Peak: Cerro Catedral (Cathedral Hill)
- Elevation: 513.66 m (1,685.2 ft)
- Coordinates: 34°22′0″S 54°40′0″W

Geography
- Location within Uruguay
- Country: Uruguay

Geology
- Rock age: Precambrian
- Rock type(s): Granite, gneiss

Cuchilla Grande is a hill range that crosses the east part of Uruguay from north to south. It extends from the south part of Cerro Largo Department, through the departments of Treinta y Tres and Lavalleja and ends in Maldonado Department where it forms its highest peaks.

== Noted features ==
In the southern part of this range, there is the Cerro Catedral, the highest point of the country. This hill is situated in the Maldonado Department.

Also found in this range are the Cerro Pan de Azúcar, likewise situated in the Maldonado Department, near Piriápolis; and the Cerro Arequita in the Lavalleja Department.

== Secondary ranges ==
- Cuchilla de Mansavillagra
- Sierra Carapé
- Sierra Aceguá
- Sierra de las Ánimas
- Cuchilla Grande Inferior
- Cuchilla de Cerro Largo

== See also ==
- Geography of Uruguay
