= Geography of Uruguay =

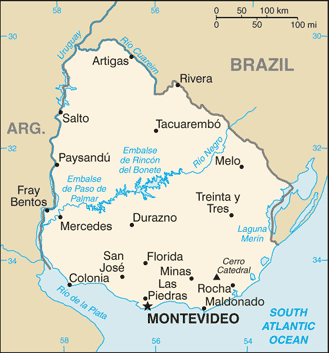
- Continent: South America
- Region: Americas
- Coordinates: 33°00′S 56°00′W
- Area: Ranked 89th
  - Total: 176,215 km^{2} (68,037 sq mi)
  - Land: 99.3%
  - Water: 0.7%
- Coastline: 660 km (410 mi)
- Borders: Total land borders: 1,564 kilometres (972 mi); Argentina: 579 km (360 mi); Brazil: 985 km (612 mi)
- Highest point: Cerro Catedral (514 m or 1,686 ft)
- Lowest point: Atlantic Ocean (0 m)
- Longest river: Rio Negro
- Exclusive economic zone: 142,166 km^{2} (54,891 mi^{2})

Uruguay is a country in the southeastern region of South America, bordering the Atlantic Ocean, between Argentina and Brazil. It is located in the Southern Hemisphere on the Atlantic seaboard of South America between 53 and 58 west longitude and 30 and 35 south latitude. It is bordered to the west by Argentina, on the north and northeast by Brazil, and on the southeast by the Atlantic Ocean, which makes up Uruguay's coast.

To the south, it fronts the Río de la Plata, a broad estuary that opens out into the South Atlantic. Montevideo, the capital and major port, sits on the banks of the Río de la Plata and is on approximately the same latitude as Cape Town and Sydney. Uruguay is the smallest Spanish-speaking nation in South America with a land area of 175,015 km^{2} (67,574 sq mi) and a water area of 1,200 km^{2} (463 sq mi). It has an Exclusive Economic Zone of 142,166 km^{2} (54,891 mi^{2}). It is the only country in South America situated completely south of the Tropic of Capricorn, as well as one of only four such in the world.

== Topography and hydrography ==
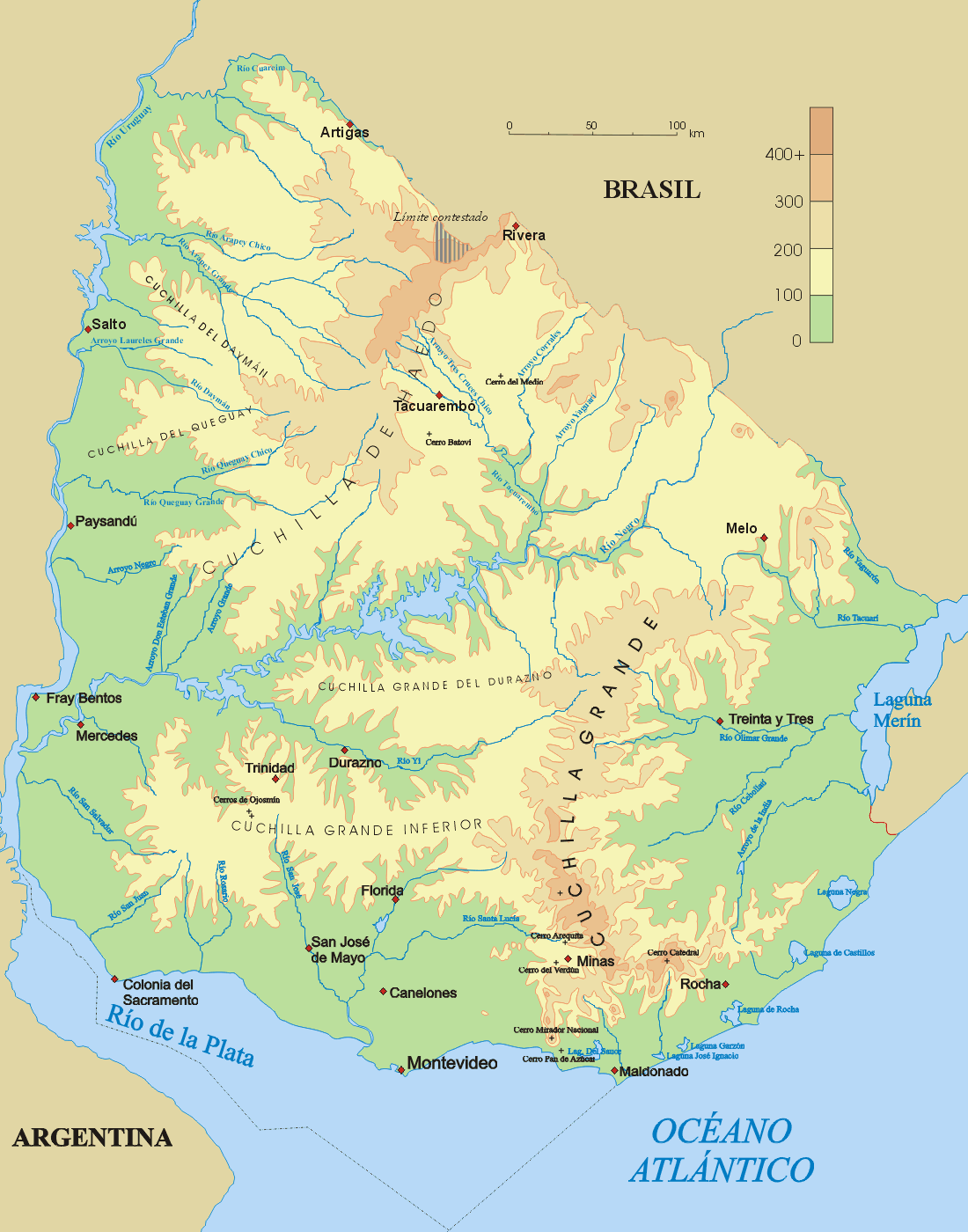
Uruguay

Most of Uruguay is a rolling plain that represents a transition from the almost featureless Argentine pampas to the hilly uplands of southern Brazil. The country itself has flat plains on its eastern, southern, and western edges. The narrow Atlantic coastal plain is sandy and marshy, occasionally broken by shallow lagoons. The littorals of the Río de la Plata and the Río Uruguay are somewhat broader and merge more gradually into the hilly interior.

The remaining three-quarters of the country is a rolling plateau marked by ranges of low hills that become more prominent in the north as they merge into the highlands of southern Brazil. Even these hilly areas are remarkably featureless, however, and elevations seldom exceed 200 metres or 660 feet. The highest point, the Cerro Catedral (513 m), is located in the southeast of the country in the Cuchilla Grande mountain range. Other noteworthy hills are Cerro Pan de Azúcar, Cerro de las Ánimas, Cerro Arequita and Cerro Batoví.

Uruguay is a water-rich land. Prominent bodies of water mark its limits on the east, south, and west, and even most of the boundary with Brazil follows small rivers. Lakes and lagoons are numerous, and a high water table makes digging wells easy.

Three systems of rivers drain the land: rivers flow westward to the Río Uruguay, eastward to the Atlantic or tidal lagoons bordering the ocean, and south to the Río de la Plata. The Río Uruguay, which forms the border with Argentina, is flanked by low banks, and disastrous floods sometimes inundate large areas. The longest and most important of the rivers draining westward is the Río Negro, which crosses the entire country from northeast to west before emptying into the Río Uruguay. A dam on the Río Negro at Paso de los Toros has created a reservoir—the Embalse del Río Negro—that is the largest artificial lake in South America. The Río Negro's principal tributary and the country's second most important river is the Yí River.

The rivers flowing east to the Atlantic are generally shallower and have more variable flow than the other rivers. Many empty into lagoons in the coastal plain. The largest coastal lagoon, Laguna Merín, forms part of the border with Brazil. Six smaller lagoons, some freshwater and some brackish, line the coast farther south.

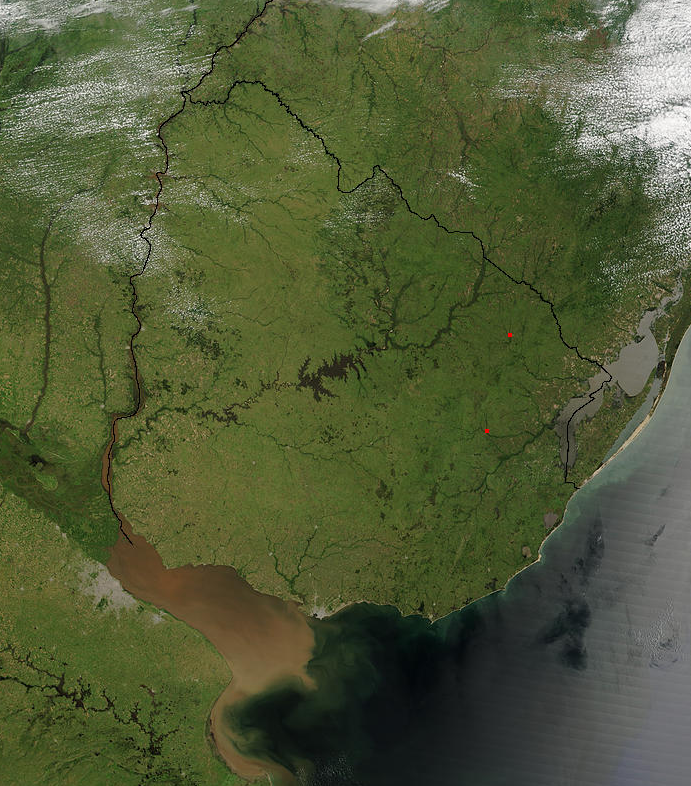
A satellite image of Uruguay

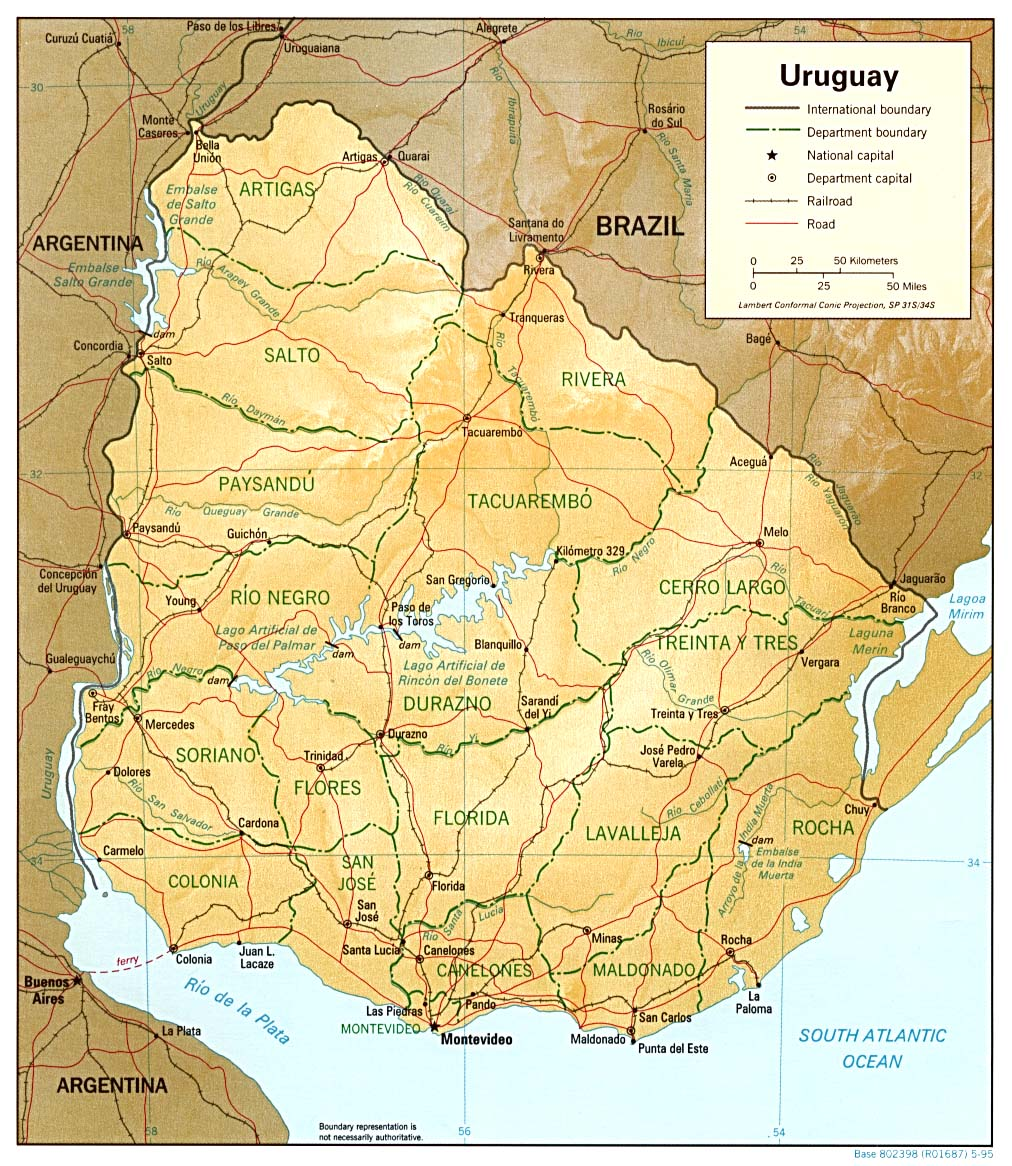
Shaded relief map of Uruguay

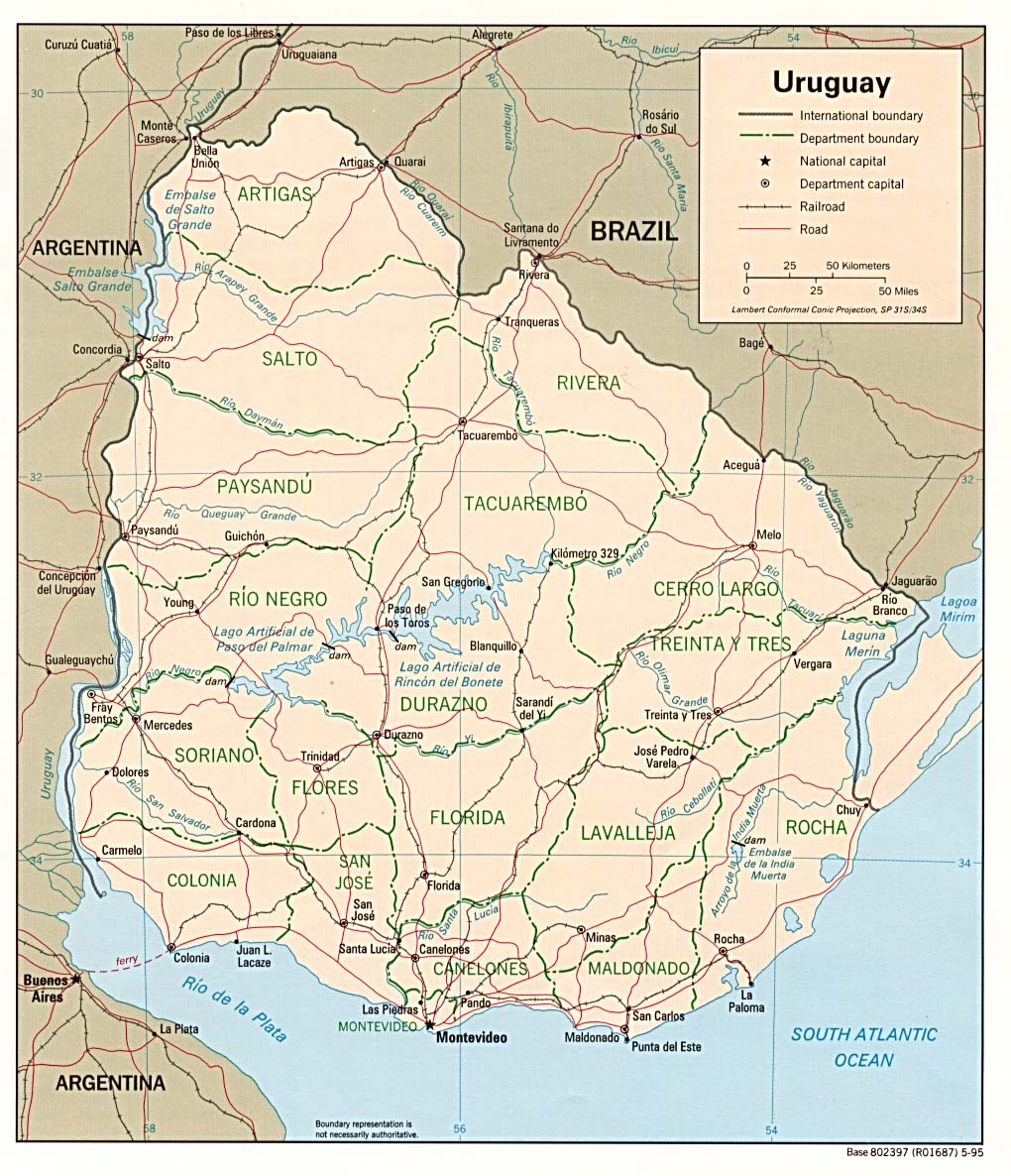
Political map of Uruguay

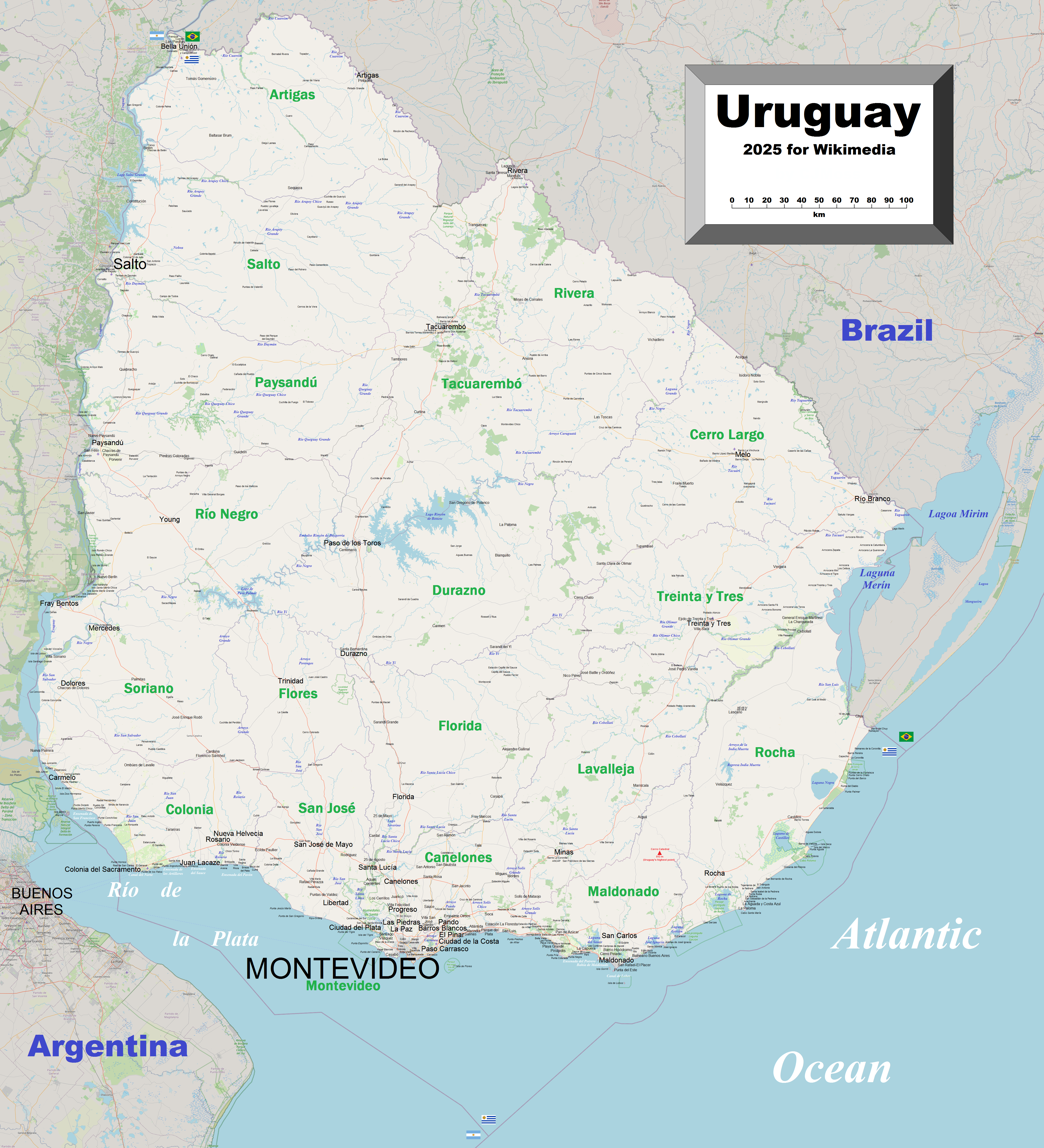
Detailed map of Uruguay

== Climate ==
Located entirely within the temperate zone, Uruguay has a humid subtropical climate (Cfa according to the Köppen climate classification) that is fairly uniform nationwide. Seasonal variations are pronounced, but extremes in temperature are rare. As would be expected by its abundance of water, high humidity and fog are common. The absence of mountains, which act as weather barriers, makes all locations vulnerable to high winds and rapid changes in weather as fronts or storms sweep across the country. Weather is sometimes humid.

Seasons are fairly well defined, and in most of Uruguay spring is usually damp, cool, and windy; summers are warm; autumns are mild; and winters are chilly and somewhat uncomfortably damp. Northwestern Uruguay, however, is farther from large bodies of water and therefore has warmer summers and milder and drier winters than the rest of the country. Average highs and lows in summer (January) in Montevideo are 28 and 17 °C (82.4 and 62.6 °F), respectively, with an absolute maximum of 43 °C (109.4 °F); comparable numbers for Artigas in the northwest are 33 and 18 °C (91.4 and 64.4 °F), with the highest temperature ever recorded 42 °C or 107.6 °F. Winter (July) average highs and lows in Montevideo are 14 and 6 °C (57.2 and 42.8 °F), respectively, although the high humidity makes the temperatures feel colder; the lowest temperature registered in Montevideo is −4 °C (24.8 °F). Averages in July of a high of 18 °C (64.4 °F) and a low of 7 °C (44.6 °F) in Artigas confirm the milder winters in northwestern Uruguay, but even here temperatures have dropped to a subfreezing −4 °C (24.8 °F).

Rainfall is fairly evenly distributed throughout the year, and annual amounts increase from southeast to northwest. Montevideo averages 950 millimeters (37.4 in) annually, and Artigas receives 1,235 millimeters (48.6 in) in an average year. As in most temperate climates, rainfall results from the passage of cold fronts in winter, falling in overcast drizzly spells, and summer thunderstorms are frequent.

High winds are a disagreeable characteristic of the weather, particularly during the winter and spring, and wind shifts are sudden and pronounced. A winter warm spell can be abruptly broken by a strong pampero, a chilly and occasionally violent wind blowing north from the Argentine pampas. Summer winds off the ocean, however, have the salutary effect of tempering warm daytime temperatures.

== Land use and settlement patterns ==
Uruguay may be divided into four regions, based on social, economic, and geographical factors. The regions include the interior, the littoral, Greater Montevideo, and the coast.

=== The interior ===
This largest region includes the departments of Artigas, Cerro Largo, Durazno, Flores, Florida, Lavalleja, Rivera, Salto, Tacuarembó, and Treinta y Tres and the eastern halves of Paysandú, Río Negro, and Soriano. The topsoil is thin and less suited to intensive agriculture, but it nourishes abundant natural pasture.

Only 2 to 3% of Uruguay's land is forested. An estimated 30,000 to 40,000 km^{2} (15,444 sq mi) (17 to 23% of the total land) are arable, but only one-third of this (about 7% of the total productive land) was cultivated in 1990. Almost all of the interior consisted of cattle and sheep ranches; pasture accounted for 89% of the country's productive land.

Sheep rearing was typically undertaken on medium-sized farms concentrated in the west and south. It began to boom as an export industry in the last quarter of the 19th century, particularly following the invention of barbed wire, which allowed the easy enclosure of properties. Uruguayan wool is of moderate quality, not quite up to Australian standards.

Cattle ranches, or estancias, for beef and hides were typically quite large (over 10 km²) and were concentrated in the north and east. Dairying was concentrated in the department of Colonia. Because ranching required little labor, merely a few gauchos, the interior lacked a peasantry and large towns. Despite being sparsely populated, however, the interior was relatively urbanized in that the capital of each department usually contained about half the inhabitants. Social and economic development indicators were lowest for the departments along the Brazilian border to the northeast. Government attempts to encourage agricultural colonization by means of land reform in the interior had largely failed in economic terms, as had the promotion of wheat production. One exception, rice, most of which was produced in the east, had become a major nontraditional export in recent years.

=== The Littoral ===
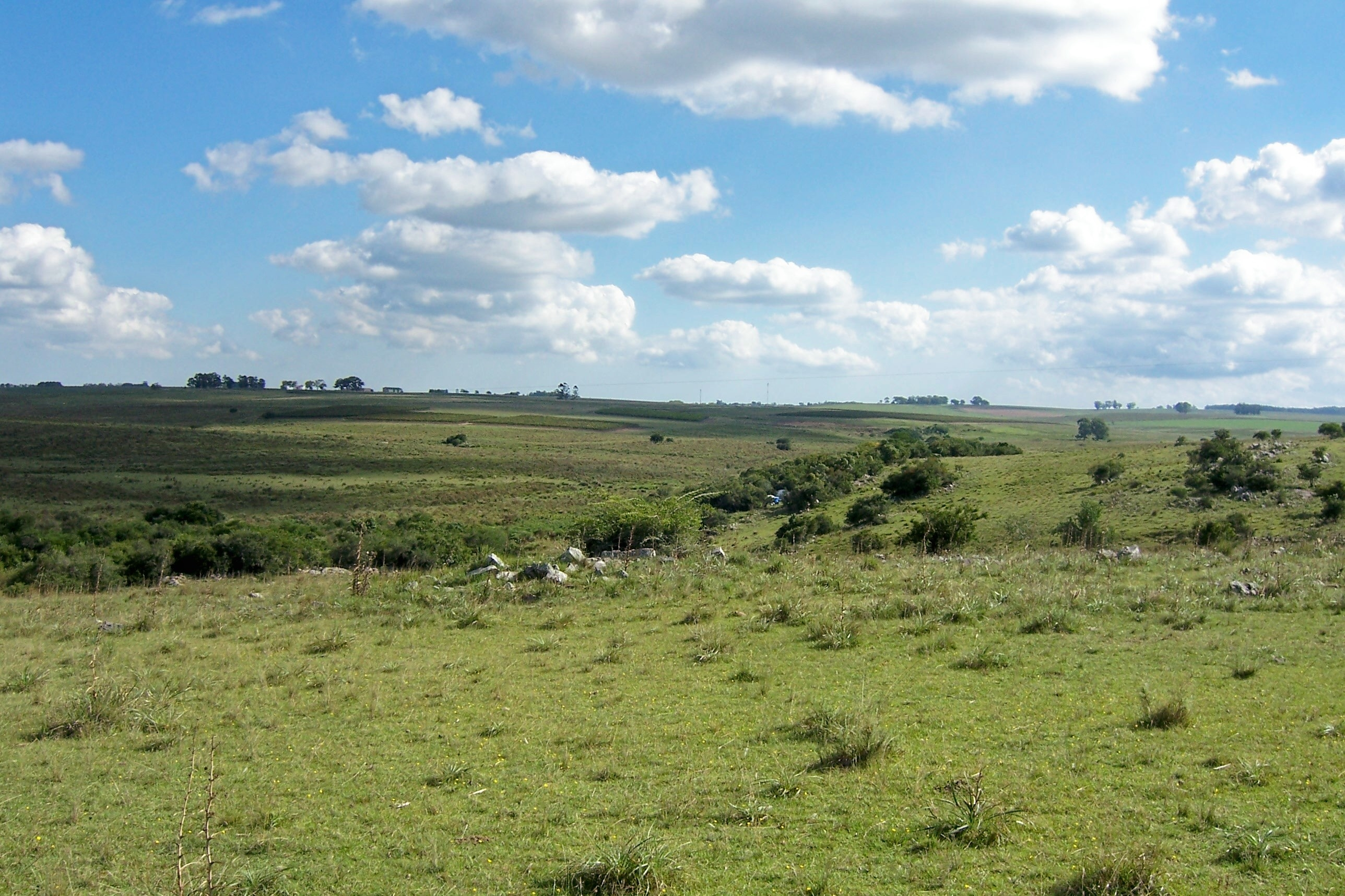
Countryside in San José department

Stretching west along the Río de la Plata from Montevideo, are the agricultural and dairying departments of San José and Colonia. To the north along the Río Uruguay lie the departments of Soriano, Río Negro, Paysandú and Salto. Their western halves form part of the litoral, a region that is somewhat more developed than the interior. Here soils are alluvial and more fertile, favoring crop production and farms of more modest size than in the interior. Citrus cultivation for export has increased in the departments along the Río Uruguay. The department of Colonia, some of which was settled by the Swiss, was famous for the production of milk, butter, cheese, and dulce de leche (a dessert made from concentrated milk and sugar). Most wheat (in which Uruguay was self-sufficient) also was produced in this region.

Construction with Argentina of the Salto Grande Dam across the Río Uruguay north of Salto was a major boost to the development of the northern litoral in the 1970s. By contrast, the closure of the famous meat-packing plant at Fray Bentos in the department of Río Negro transformed it into a virtual ghost town. Farther south, the litoral economy had benefited from completion of the General Artigas Bridge across the Río Uruguay from Paysandú to the Argentine province of Entre Ríos. However, the advent of a convenient (if circuitous) land route from Montevideo to Buenos Aires via the new bridge reduced freight and passenger traffic through the small port of Colonia on the Río de la Plata just opposite the Argentine capital. To compensate, the Uruguayan government encouraged the architectural restoration of Colonia, which was originally built by the Portuguese in colonial times. By 1990 Colonia had become one of Uruguay's most historic tourist attractions, and many of its houses had been bought by vacationers from Buenos Aires.

=== Greater Montevideo ===
According to the 2004 census, the population of the department of Montevideo was 1,325,968, and that of the neighboring department of Canelones was 485,240, out of a total population of 3,241,003. Thus, these departments and the eastern portion of San José, which together constituted the Greater Montevideo region, held over one-half of Uruguay's population.

This monocephalic pattern of settlement was more pronounced in Uruguay than in any other nation of the world, barring city-states. The 1985 census indicated a population density of about 2,475 inhabitants per square kilometer in the department of Montevideo and about 80 inhabitants per square kilometer in the department of Canelones. Densities elsewhere in the country were dramatically lower.

Montevideo was founded on a promontory beside a large bay that forms a perfect natural harbor. In the 19th century, the British promoted it as a rival port to Buenos Aires. The city has expanded to such an extent that by 1990 it covered most of the department. The original area of settlement, known as the Old City, lies adjacent to the port, but the central business district and the middle-class residential areas have moved eastward. The only exception to this pattern of eastward expansion is that banking and finance continued to cluster in the Old City around the Stock Exchange, the Bank of Uruguay (Banco de la República Oriental del Uruguay—BROU), and the Central Bank of Uruguay.

Since the 1950s, Montevideo's prosperous middle classes have tended to abandon the formerly fashionable downtown areas for the more modern high-rise apartment buildings of Pocitos, a beachfront neighborhood east of the center. Still farther east lies the expensive area of Carrasco, a zone of modern luxury villas that has come to replace the old neighborhood of El Prado in the north of the city as home to the country's wealthy elite. Its beaches were less polluted than those closer to the center. Montevideo's Carrasco International Airport is located nearby, crossing the border to Canelones Department. The capital's principal artery, 18 July Avenue, was long the principal shopping street of Montevideo, but it has been hurt since the mid-1980s by the construction of a modern shopping mall strategically located between Pocitos and Carrasco.

Montevideo's poorer neighborhoods tended to be located in the north of the city and around the bay in the areas of industrial activity. However, the degree of spatial separation of social classes was moderate by the standards of other cities in South America. Starting in the 1970s, the city began to acquire a belt of shantytowns around its outskirts, but in 1990 these remained small compared with Rio de Janeiro or Guayaquil, for example. About 60,000 families lived in such shantytowns, known in Uruguay as cantegriles. An intensive program of public housing construction was undertaken in the 1970s and 1980s, but it had not solved the problem by 1990.

In 1990 Greater Montevideo was by far the most developed region of Uruguay and dominated the nation economically and culturally. It was home to the country's two universities, its principal hospitals, and most of its communications media (television stations, radio stations, newspapers, and magazines). Attempts by the military governments from 1973 to 1985 to promote the development of the north of the country (partly for strategic reasons) failed to change this pattern of extreme centralization. In one way, however, they achieved a major success: the introduction of direct dialing revolutionized the country's long distance telephone system. By contrast, the local telephone network in Montevideo remained so hopelessly antiquated and unreliable that many firms relied on courier services to get messages to other downtown businesses.

Until the construction boom of the late 1970s, relatively few modern buildings had been constructed. In many parts of the center, elegant nineteenth-century houses built around a central patio were still to be seen in 1990. In some cases, the patio was open to the air, but in most cases it was covered by a skylight, some of which were made of elaborate stained glass. Few of these houses were used for single-family occupancy, however, and many had been converted into low-cost apartments.

The middle classes preferred to live in more modern apartments near the city center or the University of the Republic. Alternatively, they might purchase a single-family villa with a small yard at the back. Many of these were close to the beaches running east from the downtown along the avenue known as the Rambla. In Pocitos, however, high-rise apartments had replaced the single-family homes on those streets closest to the beach.

=== The coast ===
Stretching east from Montevideo along the Río de la Plata are the departments of Canelones, Maldonado, and Rocha. The inland portion of Canelones is an area of small farms and truck gardens, which produce vegetables for the capital. It was relatively poor in 1990. Many inhabitants of the department's small towns also commuted to jobs in Montevideo by express bus. Along the coast lie a string of small seaside towns (balnearios), from which more prosperous employees had also begun to commute. Farther east in the highly developed department of Maldonado lies the major resort of Punta del Este. This has been developed as a fashionable playground more for Argentines than for average Uruguayans, who found it too expensive. With its hotels, restaurants, casino, and nightclubs, Punta del Este was a major export earner, and it dominated Uruguay's tourism industry.

Vacationing Uruguayans of more modest means were concentrated in smaller resorts such as Piriápolis and Atlántida, which are closer to Montevideo. Beyond Punta del Este in the still mostly undeveloped department of Rocha, a number of communities had sprouted along the unspoiled Atlantic coast with its kilometres of sandy beaches and huge breakers. These small vacation communities—such as Aguas Dulces and Cabo Polonio, both in Rocha Department—were entirely unplanned and lacked essential services. In many cases, simple holiday chalets had been built on public property adjoining the seashore without any legal title to the land. In 1990 the authorities in Rocha Department announced plans to regulate and improve this development in hopes of encouraging visits by higher-spending tourists.

=== Regional development ===
Uruguay's regions differed markedly not only in population size and density but also in their indexes of social and economic development, including education, health care, communications, energy consumption, and industrialization. Least developed were the northern ranching departments along the Brazilian border—Artigas, Rivera, and Cerro Largo—and also Tacuarembó. Somewhat more developed was a band of six departments stretching across the center of the country, from west to east: Río Negro, Flores, Florida, Durazno, Treinta y Tres, and Rocha. More industrialized and urbanized, but still quite poor, were the departments of Soriano and Salto, which, as noted previously, benefited from the construction of a bridge and a dam, respectively, across the Río Uruguay in the late 1970s and early 1980s. The two remaining western departments—Colonia and Paysandú—were the most developed of the littoral.

Three departments close to Montevideo—San José, Canelones, and Lavalleja—presented a contradictory picture of relatively advanced economic development combined with low indexes of social modernization. Finally, Montevideo and the department of Maldonado (which is strongly affected by the tourism industry in Punta del Este) had the highest indexes of social and economic development in the country.

== Area and boundaries ==
Area
- Total: 176,215 square kilometres (68,040 sq mi)
  - country rank in the world: 89th
- Land: 175,015 square kilometres (67,570 sq mi)
- Water: 1,200 square kilometres (460 sq mi)

Area comparative
- Australia comparative: approximately 7/9 the size of Victoria
- Canada comparative: approximately 4/9 the size of Newfoundland and Labrador
- United Kingdom comparative: approximately 5/7 the size of the United Kingdom
- United States comparative: approximately the size of Missouri
- EU comparative: approximately twice the size of Serbia

Land boundaries
- total: 1,564 kilometres or 972 miles

border countries
- Argentina: 579 kilometres or 360 miles
- Brazil: 985 kilometres or 612 miles

Maritime claims
- continental shelf:
  - 200-metre (660 ft) depth or to the depth of exploitation
- Exclusive Economic Zone:
  - 142,166 km^{2} (54,891 mi^{2}), 200 nmi (370.4 km; 230.2 mi)
  - Overflight and navigation is guaranteed beyond 12 nmi (22.2 km; 13.8 mi)

Natural resources

- arable land, hydropower, minor minerals, fisheries

Irrigated land
- 1,180 square kilometres (460 mi^{2}) (2003)

Total renewable water resources
- 139 cubic kilometres (33 cu mi) (2011)

Environment – current issues
- water pollution from meat packing/tannery industry; inadequate solid/hazardous waste disposal

Environment – international agreements
- party to:

  - Antarctic Treaty
  - Antarctic-Environmental Protocol
  - Biodiversity
  - Climate Change
  - Climate Change-Kyoto Protocol
  - Desertification, Endangered Species
  - Environmental Modification
  - Hazardous Wastes
  - Kyoto Protocol
  - Law of the Sea
  - Ozone Layer Protection
  - Ship Pollution
  - Wetlands

- signed, but not ratified:
  - Marine Dumping
  - Marine Life Conservation

== See also ==
- Instituto Histórico y Geográfico del Uruguay
