= Flores Department =

Department of Uruguay

Flores
- Department
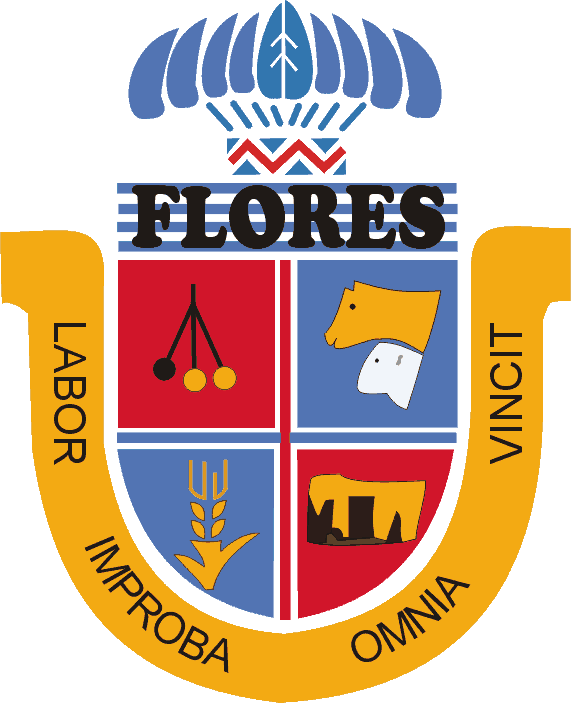
- Flag Coat of arms

- Location of Flores Department in Uruguay
- Coordinates (Trinidad): 33°32′S 56°53′W
- Country: Uruguay
- Inception: 1885
- Capital of Department: Trinidad

Government
  - Intendant: Armando Castaingdebat
  - Ruling party: Partido Nacional

Area
  - Total: 5,144 km^{2} (1,986 sq mi)
- Elevation: 106 m (348 ft)

Population (2023 census)
  - Total: 26,271
  - Density: 5.107/km^{2} (13.23/sq mi)
- Demonym: Poronguero
- Time zone: UTC-3 (UYT)
- ISO 3166 code: UY-FS
- Website: www.imflores.gub.uy

Flores (Spanish pronunciation: [ˈfloɾes]) is a department of Uruguay, positioned in the southwest of the central part of the country. Its capital is Trinidad. It borders Durazno Department to the north and east, Florida Department to the southeast, San José Department to the south and Soriano Department to the west. Its density of population was the lowest during the 2011 census, closely followed by the departments of Durazno and Treinta y Tres.

== History ==
The department was formed in 1885 from part of San José Department, during the government of President Máximo Santos. It is named after the former Colorado Party leader, Venancio Flores, who was born in Trinidad in the nineteenth century.

The department has many sites of prehistoric rock art. Such examples of rock art are particularly concentrated at Chamangá (Localidad Rupestre de Chamangá).

Another site of interest is the Palace Cave.

== Economy ==
Outside Trinidad, Flores is agricultural, primarily raising cattle for export and sheep for wool and Gauchos, the South American cowboys, can still be seen riding the plains. There are many active ranches (Spanish: estancias), some of which can be visited by tourists.

However, Flores keeps its traditions whilst utilising the best of modern technology. For example, horses are frequently used for round-ups, but communications are all digital, and wireless internet is available throughout the department.

== Fauna ==
Over 100 species of birds can be found in Flores. For example, rufous horneros, with their oven-like nests, can be seen sitting atop fence posts. Huge colonies of green parrots' nests hang high in the tall eucalyptus. Southern lapwings, locally known as teros, burrowing owls, and elegant-crested tinamou nest in open fields while long wing harriers, gray eagles, and hawks soar high above. Some of the largest great kiskadees are extremely common as are the guira, a type of cuckoo. Along quiet country lanes giant wood rails, pink spoonbills and kingfishers can be seen, alongside flocks of ibis and white egrets in the pastures. Red headed cardinals, both orange throated and red necked woodpeckers, and scissor-tailed nightjars can be seen in the small stands of trees that dot the countryside. Long, split tailed flycatchers zip above the rich grass around twilight. Glittering-bellied emerald hummingbirds drink from the tall purple flowers that carpet the fields from Spring until Fall.

Tegu lizards, armadillos, fox, skunks, hares, opossums and snakes inhabit the undeveloped pastures of the department.

A nature reserve is maintained in the department's capital, Trinidad.

== Demographics ==
Ethnic groups in Flores (2011 est.)
Ethnic groups	Percent
White	92.4%
Black	3.5%
Indigenous	3.6%
Asian	0.4%
None/Other/Unspecified	3.8%

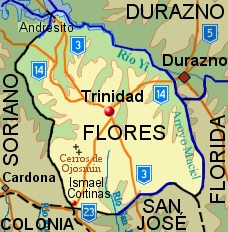
Topographic map of Flores Department showing main populated places and roads

It is the most sparsely populated of all the Uruguayan departments with a population density of under 5 people per km² and 350,000 head of cattle. Of the total population of 25,050, some 21,430 live in the capital Trinidad.

As of the census of 2011, Flores Department had a population of 25,050 (12,342 male and 12,708 female) and 10,589 households.

Demographic data for Flores Department in 2010:

- Population growth rate: 0.151%
- Birth Rate: 14.73 births/1,000 people
- Death Rate: 9.25 deaths/1,000 people
- Average age: 34.3 (33.2 male, 35.5 female)
- Life Expectancy at Birth:
  - Total population: 78.66 years
  - Male: 74.82 years
  - Female: 82.20 years
- Average per household income: 26,324 pesos/month
- Urban per capita income: 11,025 pesos/month

2010 Data Source:

Urban population

City / Town	Population
Trinidad	21,429
Ismael Cortinas	918
Andresito	261
La Casilla	181
Juan José Castro	97
Cerro Colorado	96

Rural population

Flores department has a rural population of 2,068.

Population data stated according to the 2011 census.

== Notable people ==
- Dr. Armando Castaingdebat is the administrative head of Flores Department.
- Danilo Pallares Echeverría is a local writer and musician, author of the 'Flores Hymn'.
- Faustino Harrison was President of Uruguay 1962-1963.
- Benito Medero was a government minister in the 1970s and Ruralist leader in the 1960s.
- Chory Castro is an international soccer player.

== See also ==
- List of populated places in Uruguay#Flores Department
- Máximo Santos#Creation of Flores Department
- Himno a Flores (Flores hymn)
- Trinidad, Uruguay#Nature reserve
