= Quintela (disambiguation) =

Quintela may refer to:

== Places ==
- Mones Quintela, town in northern Uruguay
- Quintela, parish in Sernancelhe, Portugal
- Quintela de Azurara, parish in Mangualde, Portugal
- Quintela de Lampaças, parish in Bragança, Portugal
- Quintela de Leirado, municipality in Galicia, Spain

== People ==
- Alfredo Mones Quintela, Uruguayan agricultural engineer, namesake of the town of Mones Quintela
- Carlos M. Quintela, Cuban film director of La Piscina (2012)
- Santiago Quintela Montero, Spanish pioneer of the electrical industry, Founder of Quintela S.A (born 1943)
- Eduardo Quintela, musician, husband of Christine McVie and songwriter with her for Fleetwood Mac
- Fernando Henrique Quintela Cavalcante (a.k.a. Nando, born 1990), Brazilian footballer
- Inácio da Costa Quintela (1763–1838), Portuguese naval officer, historian, poet and politician
- Joaquim Pedro Quintela, 1st Baron of Quintela (1748–1817), Portuguese businessman and landowner
- Joaquim Pedro Quintela, 1st Count of Farrobo (1801–1869), Portuguese aristocrat and businessman
- José Diogo Quintela, Portuguese comedian
- Manuel Quintela, Uruguayan doctor, namesake of Hospital de Clínicas "Dr. Manuel Quintela"
- Óscar Francisco García Quintela (a.k.a. Pinchi, born 1996), Spanish footballer
- Pedro Ricardo Quintela Henriques (born 1974), Portuguese footballer
- Peregrina Quintela Estévez (born 1960), Spanish mathematician
- Silvia Quintela (1948 – c. 1977), disappeared Argentine doctor
- Teresita Quintela (born 1950), Argentine politician
