= Campodónico =

Campodonico is a surname of Italian origin, Campodonico being a hamlet of the municipality of Chiavari in Liguria, trading sea region of Northern Italy. Notable people with this surname include:

- Amanda Campodónico (1879–1933), Argentine mezzo-soprano singer
- César Campodónico (1929–2005), Uruguayan actor
- Elida Campodónico (1894–1960), Panamanian teacher, women's rights advocate and attorney
- Esteban Campodónico (1866-1938), Italian-Peruvian medical doctor, university professor, and philanthropist
- Juan Campodónico (born 1971), Uruguayan musician, producer, composer, creator
- Mariano Campodónico (born 1974), Argentine football manager and former player
- Pablo Campodónico (born 1977), Argentine professional footballer
- Rodolfo Campodónico, one of the first composers of waltzes in Mexico
- Wally Campo (1923–2023), American actor born as Wallace Joseph Campodonico.
