= Portones de Hierro y Campodónico =

- Populated rural area and suburb of Bella Unión
- Location in Uruguay
- Coordinates: 30°15′55″S 57°34′30″W
- Country: Uruguay
- Department: Artigas Department

Population (2011)
  - Total: 323
- Time zone: UTC -3
- Postal code: 55100
- Dial plan: +598 4779 (+4 digits)

Portones de Hierro y Campodónico is a populated rural area and suburb the city of Bella Unión in Artigas Department of northwestern Uruguay.

== Geography ==
It borders the city to the northwest, the suburb Coronado to the west, and Brazil to the east, with Río Cuareim between them as the natural international border.

== Population ==
In 2011 Portones de Hierro y Campodónico had a population of 323.

Year	Population
1963	322
1975	575
1985	533
1996	396
2004	404
2011	323

Source: Instituto Nacional de Estadística de Uruguay
