= Sequeira, Uruguay =

Sequiera Pueblo Sequiera
- Populated rural area
- Location in Uruguay
- Coordinates: 31°2′0″S 56°52′0″W
- Country: Uruguay
- Department: Artigas Department

Population (2011)
  - Total: 1,149
- Time zone: UTC - 3
- Postal code: 55007
- Dial plan: +598 4776 (+4 digits)

Sequiera is a village ("pueblo") in the south of the Artigas Department in northwestern Uruguay.

== Geography ==
It is located on Km.125 of Route 4, about 80 kilometres (50 mi) south-southwest of Artigas, the capital of the department, and 127 kilometres (79 mi) east-northeast of Salto, the capital of the Salto Department.

It is situated between the streams Arroyo Sequeira to the east and Zanja de los Talas to the west, both tributaries of Río Arapey Chico, which flows 4.5 kilometres (2.8 mi) south of the populated area.

== History ==
The name comes from the Guaraní-mission commander Ramón Sequeira, who in 1832 rebelled against the government of Fructuoso Rivera. On June 5 of that year Sequeira was surprised and defeated by troops led by Bernabé Rivera on the Arapey Chico.

In 1997 a tornado swept through the town, destroyed traditional wood and mud huts Sequeira was completely rebuilt with more solid buildings that are distributed on both sides of Route 4.

Its status was elevated to "Pueblo" (village) by the Act of Ley 17.413 on 2 November 2001.

== Population ==
In 2011, Sequiera had a population of 1149.

Year	Population
1963	880
1975	802
1985	650
1996	877
2004	970
2011	1,149

Source: Instituto Nacional de Estadística de Uruguay

=== Life expectancy ===
Sequeira is noted for having an unusually high number of centenarians. In 2003 these were Marta Caballero (102), Augusta Rodríguez Mezquita (113), Francisca Paz (101), Maneca Tejeira (106) and Bartolo Díaz (106).

== Economy ==
It is a major service centre for sheep farming.
