= Las Piedras, Artigas =

Las Piedras
- Suburb of Bella Unión
- Location in Uruguay
- Coordinates: 30°14′0″S 57°35′0″W
- Country: Uruguay
- Department: Artigas Department

Population (2011)
  - Total: 2,771
- Time zone: UTC -3
- Postal code: 55100
- Dial plan: +598 4779 (+4 digits)

Las Piedras (which means "The Stones") is a suburb of Bella Unión in the Artigas Department of northern Uruguay.

== Geography ==
Las Piedras, Franquia and Cuareim are located on a protruding part of land between Uruguay River and the mouth of Río Cuareim, where the international boundaries of Uruguay, Argentina and Brazil meet.

The suburb is located on Route 3 and borders the urban area of the city to the south, suburb Franquia to the north and suburb Cuareim to the west.

== Population ==
In 2011 it had a population of 2,771.

Year	Population
1963	216
1975	738
1985	1,253
1996	2,099
2004	2,164
2011	2,771

Source: Instituto Nacional de Estadística de Uruguay
