= Pintadito =

- Suburb of Artigas
- Location in Uruguay
- Coordinates: 30°26′2″S 56°27′34″W
- Country: Uruguay
- Department: Artigas Department

Population (2011)
  - Total: 1,642
- Time zone: UTC -3
- Postal code: 55000
- Dial plan: +598 477 (+5 digits)

Pintadito is a southern suburb of the capital city Artigas of Artigas Department in northern Uruguay.

== Geography ==
It is located on Route 30, about 5 kilometres (3.1 mi) south of the city centre, after the suburb Cerro Ejido.

The stream Arroyo Pintadito, a tributary of Río Cuareim, flows east of the suburb.

== Population ==
In 2011, Pintadito had a population of 1,642 inhabitants.

Year	Population
1985	558
1996	1,067
2004	1,487
2011	1,642

Source: Instituto Nacional de Estadística de Uruguay
