= Adelia Silva =

Uruguayan educator, writer and social activist

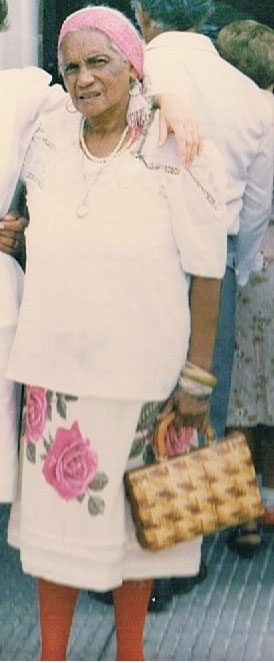
- Born: 3 April 1925; Artigas, Uruguay
- Died: 10 July 2004 (aged 79); Artigas, Uruguay
- Other name: Adelia Silva de Sosa
- Occupations: teacher, journalist
- Years active: 1946–2001

Adelia Silva (3 April 1925 – 10 July 2004) was a Uruguayan educator, writer and social activist. She became the first Afro-Uruguayan to earn a teaching degree. She taught in rural schools, weathering racial and sexist discrimination. She moved to Montevideo in 1956, but was transferred numerous times as a result of racial discrimination, ultimately returning home to Artigas. She filed a complaint with the National Council of Primary Education, which led to widespread media coverage of her treatment, heightening awareness of the racial and gender divides in Uruguayan society.

In 1960, Silva took an examination and became the first person of African descent in Uruguay to serve as a primary school inspector. She worked as an inspector in various departments and taught both high school and normal school courses through the 1970s. She also volunteered as a teacher for students with learning disabilities, boarders in care homes, and prisoners at the local jail. In 1981, she earned a journalism degree and retired from teaching. Embarking on a second career as a writer, Silva traveled widely, published a textbook on chemistry, and earned several awards as a poet. She died in 2004 and is remembered for her role in changing the perception of freedom and equality in Uruguay.

== Early life ==
Born on 3 April 1925 in Artigas, Uruguay, Adelia Silva was the illegitimate daughter of the live-in domestic servant of Julia Bianchi. Silva never knew her father, and her mother was a dependent of the Bianchi family under the patrón system that existed after slavery was abolished in Uruguay. Silva's mother died when she was nine months old and she was raised by Bianchi. She attended Escuela Nº 1 de niñas (Girls' School #1) from 1931 to 1937 and then attended high school at the Liceo Departamental (Departmental Lyceum) from 1938 to 1942. Continuing her education at the Instituto Normal de Artigas (Normal School of Artigas), she received a teaching diploma. In 1946, she passed her examinations in Montevideo, becoming the first Uruguayan of African descent to obtain a teaching certification.

== Career ==
=== Teaching (1948–1979) ===
Silva worked as a rural teacher in the Artigas, Canelones, Colonia, and Florida Departments. During this period, she had a brief marriage with Félix César Sosa with whom she had a daughter, Luz Marina Sosa. She adopted another daughter, Marta, and raised the girls as a single mother at a time when most women were economically dependent on their spouse. Though she struggled to support them, Silva believed that women had a right to be educated and independent. By the mid-1950s, despite experiencing prevalent sexism and racial discrimination, she had become principal of a rural school in Artigas. Convinced that education was the only way to overcome prejudice and the disdain of her colleagues, in 1956, Silva enrolled in advanced teaching courses at the Instituto Magisterial Superior (Higher Magisterial Institute) of Montevideo. Her attendance was made possible by a federal scholarship, which provided her with student teaching employment while she attended classes.

Assigned to Gran Bretaña (Great Britain), an elementary school, when Silva arrived to teach, she was transferred to another school. (Note: Sources conflict on the first assignment. Andrews states that an opening was not found for Silva at Gran Bretaña. Scuro Somma states Silva began work there but, "por motivos infundados y ajenos a su desempeño laboral, se le sugirió que solicitara traslado de la escuela donde trabajaba" ["for unfounded reasons unrelated to her work performance, it was suggested that she request a transfer from the school where she worked". Palermo states "she was working as a teacher at the "Gran Bretaña" (Great Britain) school in Montevideo. There, she was discriminated against by the institution's director, who suggested she move to another school because of her skin color". The latter seems unlikely, as according Andrews, the only person found guilty of actual discrimination by the National Council of Primary Education was the principal of the 2nd school.) As her transfer had nothing to do with her performance, she was reassigned to Public School Nº 125. Principal Ofelia Ferretjans de Ugartemendia pressured her to obtain another transfer "because of her skin color". When she arrived at her third post at Public School Nº 16, principal Irene Castro de Mandado told her that parents had submitted a petition for her removal, as they did not want a black woman who spoke Portuñol (a pidgin language combining Spanish and Portuguese, typically spoken by people living in the border area between Brazil and Uruguay) (Note: Karla Chagas and Natalia Stalla note in their brief biography of Silva that she spoke Spanish with impeccable pronunciation, demonstrating a mastery of the language.) teaching their children. Demoralized by the treatment she had experienced, Silva resigned her scholarship and returned to Artigas in 1956.

After discussing what happened with friends, Silva wrote a letter to the Consejo Nacional de Enseñanza Primaria (National Council of Primary Education) and requested that they conduct an investigation into the situation. The case attracted national media attention, sparking discussion of the unequal treatment blacks received in the country, contrary to legal protections for equality. Silva was urged by civic groups and teachers' unions to return to Montevideo to teach, but she remained in Artigas, having returned to her rural school as principal. In 1957, the National Council of Primary Education found Ugartemendia guilty of racial discrimination, transferred her from her post, and fined her an amount equal to half of her salary for six months. The Council did not find sufficient evidence to confirm discrimination by Mandado, who was allowed to keep her job.

In 1960, Silva took an examination that enabled her to become the first person of African descent in Uruguay to serve as a primary school inspector. In 1962, she was assigned the post of school zone inspector for the Artigas, Florida, and Salto Departments. During this time, she taught secondary school courses in chemistry, physics, and French at the Liceo Nº 1 and Colegio de las Hermanas Carmelitas (Carmelite Sisters High School). She also taught history of education, pedagogy, psychology, and sociology at the Instituto de Formación Docente de Artigas (Teacher Training Institute of Artigas) and volunteered as a tutor for students with learning disabilities and for boarders at the Hogar Rural de Varones (Rural Home for Boys) and inmates at the Centro Carcelario (Central Prison) in Artigas.

=== Writing (1981–2001) ===
After several years of traveling back and forth between Artigas and Montevideo, Silva completed her studies earning a diploma in journalism in 1981. She retired as a teacher and began a second career as a writer. She traveled three times to Europe, visiting France, Monaco, Spain, Switzerland, and the Vatican. Wherever she traveled she made extensive notes for later reflection and wrote poetry in Spanish and Italian. Her skill with languages was self-taught, but she learned to read English, French, and Italian, using dictionaries and evaluating the context of the words. In 1985, she was awarded the Diploma de Honor del círculo de artes y letras (Diploma of Honor of the Circle of Arts and Letters) by the Ángel Falco literary group. In Artigas that year, Semana del Libro (Book Week), an event she helped found and popularize, was named "Maestra Adelia Silva" in her honor.

In 1987, her colleagues from the local high school financed the publication of a book Silva co-wrote with Mary Suarez de Simon, a fellow teacher, Hacia el siglo XXI con la química en acción (Towards the 21st Century with Chemistry in Action). Wanting to further her knowledge, she completed a diploma in public relations in 1993. In 2000, Silva was selected as Uruguay's representative to the Teleconference of Latin American Poets. She was awarded the "Rocco Certo" prize of the Sicilian Chamber of Commerce for a poem written in Italian from the Italian Society of San José in 2001.

== Death and legacy ==
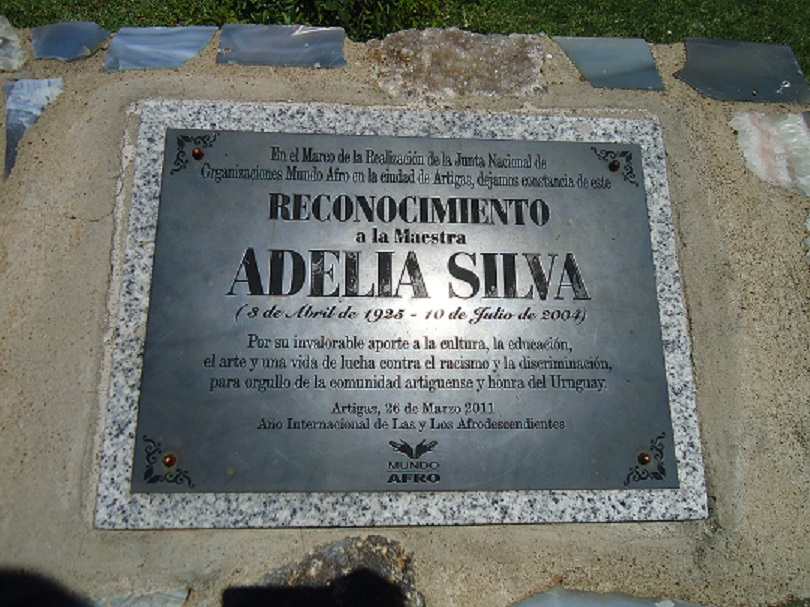
Plaque at the Monumento al Maestro in Artigas.

Silva died on 10 July 2004 in Artigas from complications of severe asthma. In her teaching career she had influenced hundreds of students, having taught them to question not only who they wanted to be, but their impact on others. Her struggle to excel and overcome the problems of sexism and racism helped to bring about a shift in the perception of freedom and equality in Uruguay. A brief biography of Silva was included in the 2009 book, Recuperando la memoria: afrodescendientes en la frontera uruguayo brasileña a mediados del siglo XX (Recovering Memory: Afro-descendants on the Uruguayan-Brazilian Border in the Mid-20th Century) by Karla Chagas and Natalia Stalla. In 2011, the Ministry of Education and Culture financed a project, in conjunction with the International Year for People of African Descent celebrations, for the Municipality of Artigas and the Organizacion Mundo Afro (World Africa Organization), among other groups, to publish Adelia Silva, un legado de luz (Adelia Silva: A Legacy of Light) to honor her memory.
