= Brigadier General Diego Lamas =

Train station in northern Uruguay

Brigadier General Diego Lamas is the name of a train station in a rural area of the Artigas Department of northern Uruguay, by decree Ley No. 11.857, which regularised the nomenclature of several stations on the Cuareim railway line in honour of nineteenth-century military figures, including Brigadier General Diego Eugenio Lamas (1810–1868). During the census of 2004, no population was recorded in this location. In the satellite image of 8/10/2003 (currently the latest of the area), about 30 small buildings appear near the station (see 30°45′14.2″S 57°3′14.8″W). The settlement that grew up around the siding is registered by the Instituto Nacional de Estadística (INE) as locality code 02934, confirming its status as an independent census entity. The former station lies at kilometre 730 of the broad-gauge branch linking Baltasar Brum with Artigas city.

INE cartography places Diego Lamas on the Belén ridge, roughly 25 km by rural roads east of Baltasar Brum. The 2011 locality plan shows about three dozen dwellings ranged along the disused station yard, a pair of unpaved cross streets and surrounding paddocks devoted to cattle and rice cultivation. The track through Diego Lamas forms part of the Rivera line (Red General Activa) and, under the DNTF'’s 2025 network declaration, is authorised exclusively for freight trains at a maximum 40 km/hour, with no regular passenger timetable.

Census micro-data show a high incidence of unsatisfied basic needs: in 2011, 37.8 % of households lacked a cooking space with piped water, 43.2 % had no refrigerator, and 29.7 % reported multiple comfort-equipment deficits, figures characteristic of settlements with only rudimentary urban services.

== Demographics ==
Diego Lamas appeared for the first time as a distinct census locality in 2011, when INE enumerated 128 residents—77 males and 51 females—living in 38 private households. Earlier censuses (1963–2004) did not report separate figures, indicating that the population remained below the national reporting threshold until the early twenty-first century. Because Diego Lamas' 2011 population (128) falls well below the 2 000-resident legal threshold, it has no elected municipality; all municipal functions are exercised directly by the Artigas departmental government.
