= Colonia Palma =

Palma, Uruguay
- Village
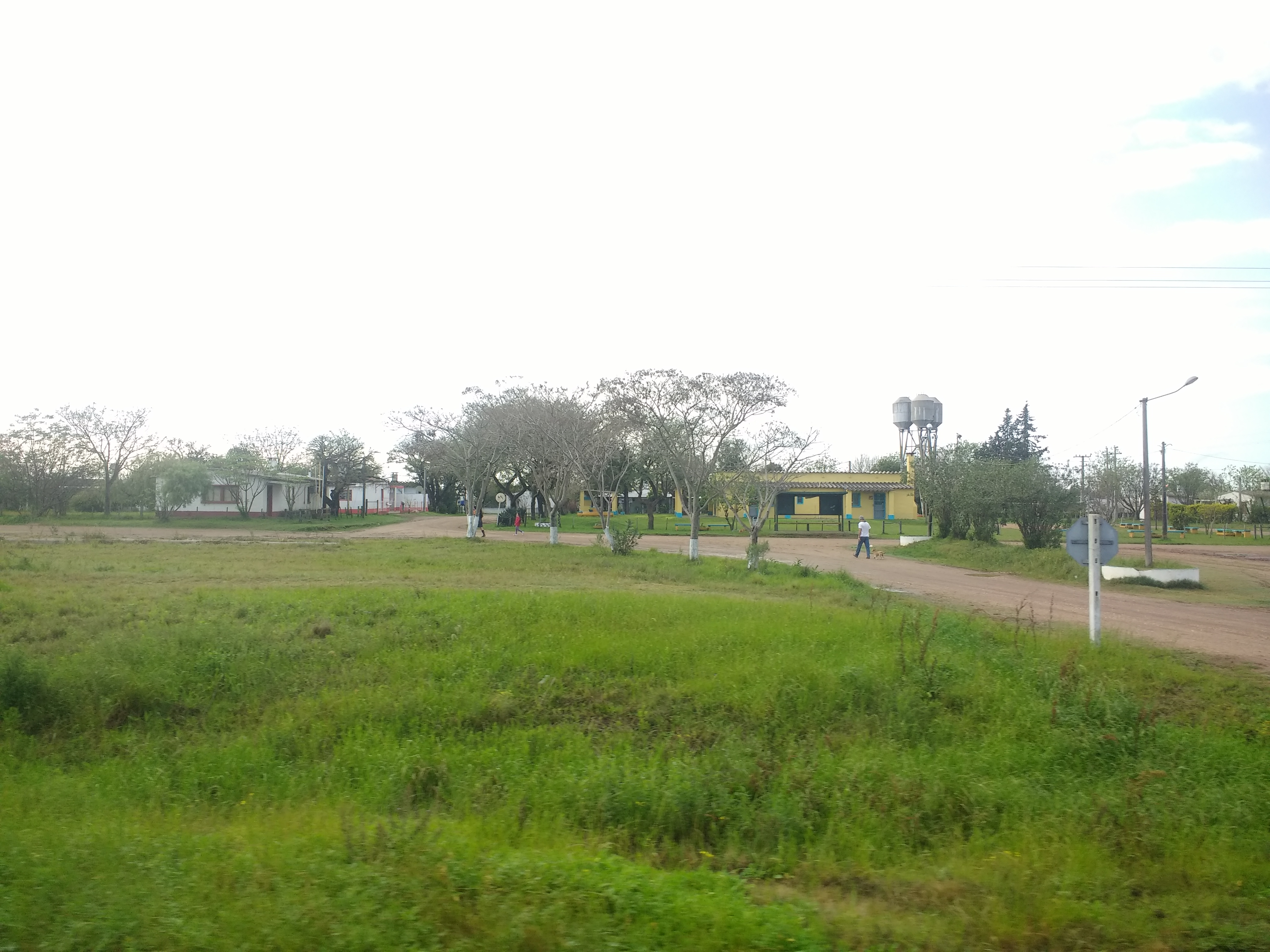

- Location in Uruguay
- Coordinates: 30°35′3″S 57°40′45″W
- Country: Uruguay
- Department: Artigas Department

Population (2011)
  - Total: 440
- Time zone: UTC -3
- Postal code: 55100
- Dial plan: +598 4778 (+4 digits)

Colonia Palma is a village in the Artigas Department of northern Uruguay.

== Geography ==
It is located on Route 3, about 83 kilometres (52 mi) south of Bella Unión.

== History ==
On 13 September 2006, its status was elevated to "Pueblo" (village) by the Act of Ley Nº 18.014.

== Population ==
In 2011 Colonia Palma had a population of 440.

Year	Population
1996	166
2004	416
2011	440

Source: Instituto Nacional de Estadística de Uruguay
