= Cainsa =

- Town
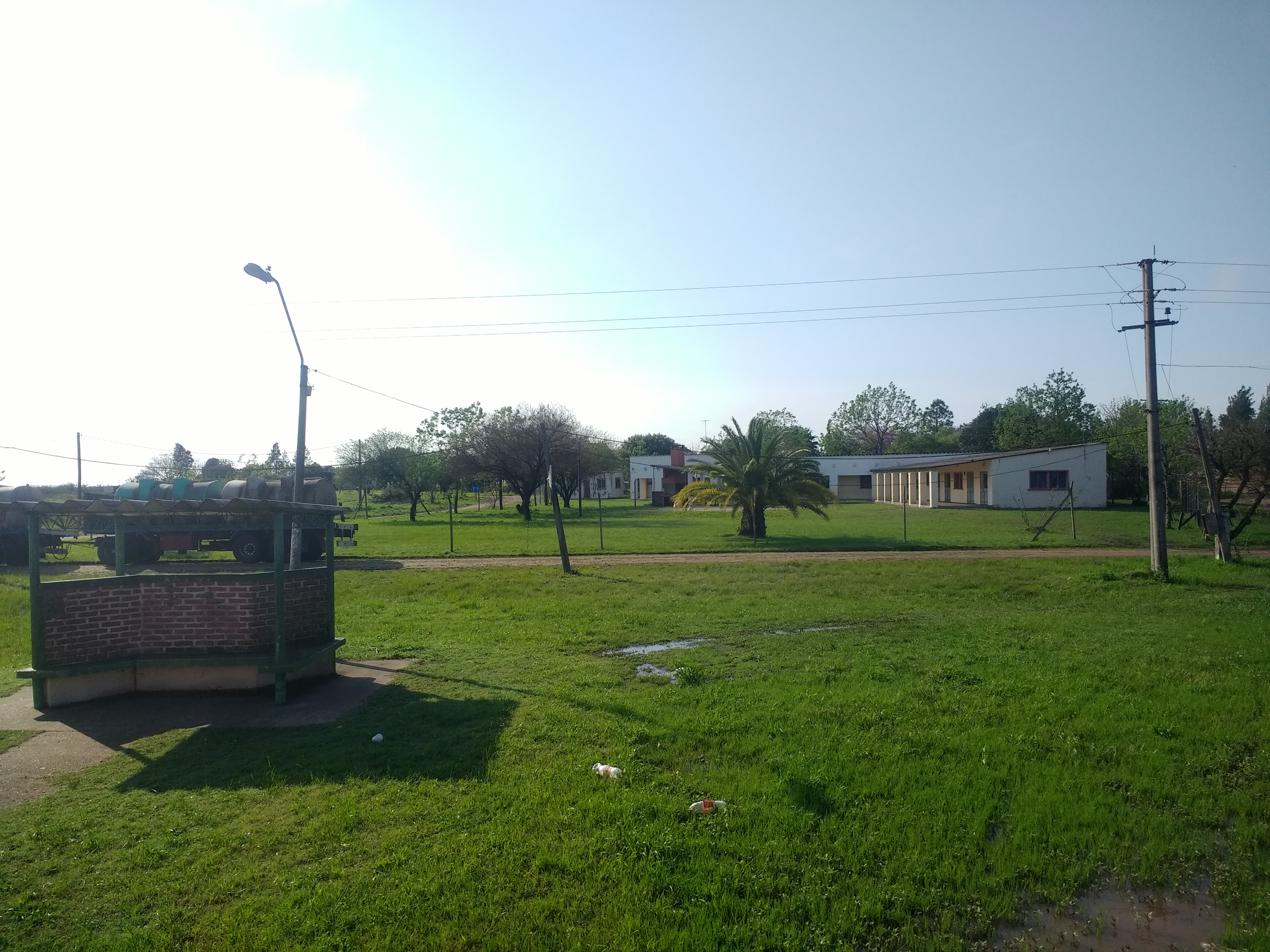

- Location in Uruguay
- Coordinates: 30°23′21″S 57°36′46″W
- Country: Uruguay
- Department: Artigas Department

Population (2011)
  - Total: 355
- Time zone: UTC - 3
- Postal code: 55100
- Dial plan: +598 4778 (+4 digits)

Cainsa is a small town in the Artigas Department of northern Uruguay.

== Geography ==
The town is located along the Route 3 to the southeast of Mones Quintela and 15 kilometres (9.3 mi) south of Bella Unión.

== Population ==
According to the 2011 census, its population was 355.
