= Cerro Ejido =

- Suburb of Artigas
- Location in Uruguay
- Coordinates: 30°26′0″S 56°27′34″W
- Country: Uruguay
- Department: Artigas Department

Population (2011)
  - Total: 790
- Time zone: UTC -3
- Postal code: 55000
- Dial plan: +598 477 (+5 digits)

Cerro Ejido is a suburb of the city of Artigas in the Artigas Department of northern Uruguay.

== Geography ==
It is located at the south urban limits of the city. The populated fragments of San Eugenio and Cerro Signorelli lie to its west and the suburb Pintadito lies to its south. Route 30 passes a small distance to the east of these suburbs.

== Population ==
In 2011 Cerro Ejido had a population of 790 inhabitants.

Year	Population
1996	177
2004	516
2011	790

Source: Instituto Nacional de Estadística de Uruguay
