= Cerro San Eugenio =

- Village
- Location in Uruguay
- Coordinates: 30°25′40″S 56°28′15″W
- Country: Uruguay
- Department: Artigas Department

Population (2011)
  - Total: 425
- Time zone: UTC - 3
- Postal code: 55100
- Dial plan: +598 477 (+5 digits)

Cerro San Eugenio is a village in the Artigas Department of northern Uruguay.

== Geography ==
Cerro San Eugenio is located in the northeastern part of the department, west of the Quaraí River, approximately 0.7 km (0.43 mi) south of the city of Artigas, the department capital. Route 30 runs north of Cerro San Eugenio.

=== Climate ===
Cerro San Eugenio has a humid subtropical climate, described by the Köppen climate classification as Cfa. The average annual air temperature is 19.4 °C. The average temperature of the coldest month (July) is 13.3 °C, the hottest month (January) is 26 °C. The estimated long-term precipitation rate is 1,320 mm.

== Population ==
In 2011 Cerro San Eugenio had a population of 425 (231 men and 294 women). There were 173 houses.

Year	Population
2004	95
2011	425

Source: Instituto Nacional de Estadística de Uruguay
