= Empress of Uruguay =

Large amethyst geode found in Uruguay, 2007

The Empress of Uruguay is the world's largest amethyst geode, standing at a height of 3.27 meters. It is open along its length and weighs 2.5 tons in its current state. It was discovered in 2007 in the Artigas department, Uruguay by the Uruguayan mining company Le Stage Minerals. Its estimated value is US $190,000, although it is not for sale.

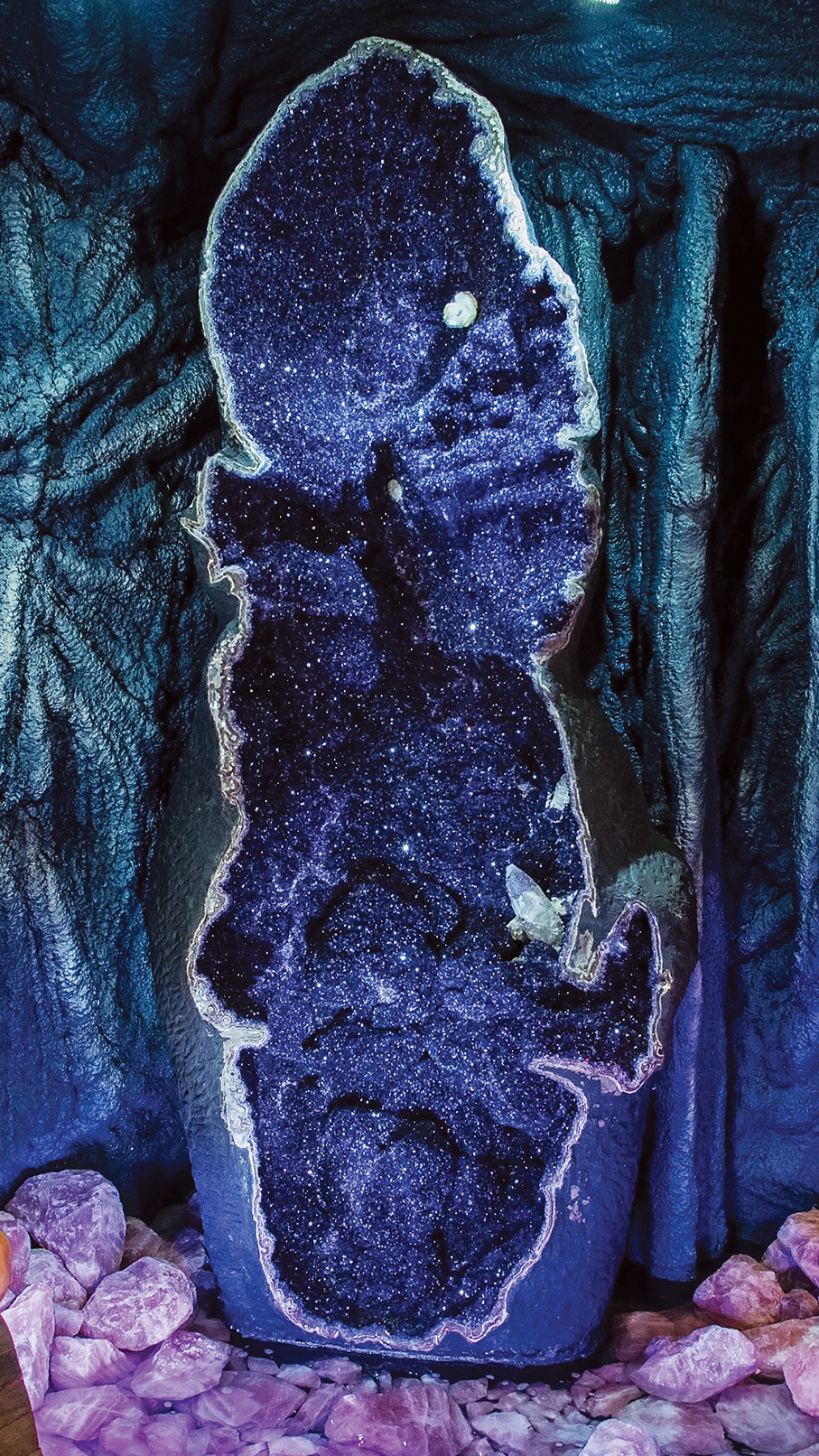
The Empress of Uruguay on display at The Crystal Caves, Atherton, Queensland.

== Background ==
The geode was found in a mine near the city of Artigas, known for its spectacular geodes and amethysts. It was extracted from the surrounding basalt in a complicated process that took three months. The top part was cut to allow for a view of the interior and the amethyst crystals that were on the top were sold. The decision was made to leave the majority of the geode intact for exhibition purposes. It is part of a travelling exhibition and has been on display at the American Museum of Natural History, among other places.

The piece is currently on public display at The Crystal Caves museum located in Atherton, a small town in the state of Queensland, Australia. The crystal was placed there in 2007 after its extraction and subsequently being shipped from Brazil to Atherton. In 2011, while it was on display at the Crystal Caves Museum, the geode was damaged when a tourist secretly removed a piece the size of a tennis ball.
