= Pablo Aurrecochea =

Uruguayan footballer (born 1981)

Personal information
- Full name: Pablo Fernando Aurrecochea Medina
- Date of birth: 8 March 1981 (age 45)
- Place of birth: Artigas, Uruguay
- Height: 1.85 m (6 ft 1 in)
- Position: Goalkeeper

Senior career*
Years	Team	Apps	(Gls)
1998–1999	Nacional Montevideo		
1999–2001	Argentinos Juniors	1	(0)
2002–2004	Talleres (RE)	30	(0)
2004–2008	Tacuary	95	(0)
2017	→ Cerro Porteño (loan)	16	(0)
2008	Bucaramanga	0	(0)
2009–2013	Guaraní	131	(0)
2014	Deportivo Capiatá	7	(0)
2014–2015	Deportes Antofagasta	1	(0)
2015–2016	Atlanta	19	(0)
2016–2017	Argentino de Merlo		
- * Club domestic league appearances and goals

Pablo Fernando Aurrecochea Medina (born March 3, 1981) is an Uruguayan former professional footballer who played as a goalkeeper. He was known for wearing kits adorned with cartoon characters such as Tom and Jerry, Krusty the Clown, The Incredible Hulk, Batman, He-Man, El Chapulín Colorado and others.

== Career ==
Aurrecochea was born in Artigas, Uruguay. He started his professional football career with Uruguayan football club Nacional. After he moved to Argentina, first with Argentinos Juniors and then Talleres de Remedios de Escalada, he started to establish himself as a first-choice goalkeeper. This would see him move to Paraguayan Primera División side Tacuary. He then became a regular for several seasons of the team until the 2007 league season saw him loaned off to another Paraguayan side in Cerro Porteño. Pablo would return from his loan period and play for Tacuary again in a further five league games. However, that wasn't enough for him to regain his position within the team and he left to join top tier Colombian side Bucaramanga.

In 2009, Aurrecochea would join another Paraguayan side in Guaraní and was initially tried out in some of the 2009 Copa Libertadores group games. Throughout the league season he would gradually go on to establish himself at the club and by the 2010 Paraguayan Primera División season he was part of the team that won the 2010 Apertura.

== Honours ==
Guaraní

- Torneo Apertura: 2010
