= Amanda Campodónico =

Argentine singer

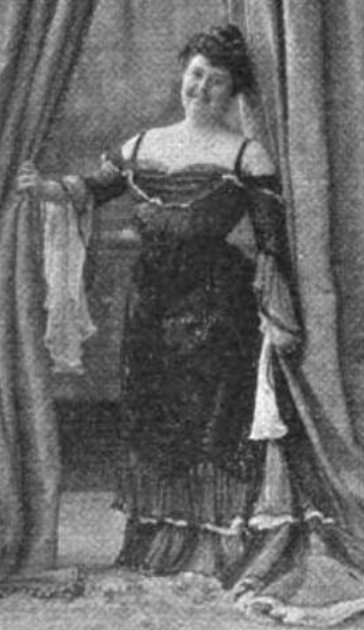
- Amanda Campodónico, from a 1903 publication
- Born: 17 November 1879; Rosario, Argentina
- Died: 11 April 1933 (aged 53); Buenos Aires
- Occupation: Singer

Amanda Campodónico (17 November 1879 – 11 April 1933) was an Argentine mezzo-soprano singer.

== Early life and education ==
Campodónico was born in Rosario, Argentina, and studied music there, before continuing her training in Milan. She also studied in Brussels, Rome, and Naples.

== Career ==
In 1897, Campodónico made her debut on the opera stage at the Gran Teatro del Liceo in Barcelona, in Samson and Delilah, conducted by the composer Camille Saint-Saëns. Also in 1897, she sang at the Teatro dell'Opera di Roma, in a company with Raffaele Grani, Eugenio Giraldoni, and Maurizio Bensaude. She performed throughout Europe, and toured in the Americas. In 1899, she was lead mezzo-soprano of an Italian opera company when it toured in Mexico, performing alongside Aristide Anceschi.

After returning to Argentina, Campodónico sang mainly in recital and concert settings. In 1906 she was appointed as a music teacher; she taught at a normal school, and at the Williams Conservatory in Buenos Aires. One of her voice students was Hina Spani.

== Personal life ==
Campodónico died in 1933, aged 53, in Buenos Aires. In 1958, a street in Rosario was named in her memory.
