= Bernabé Rivera =

- Village
- Location in Uruguay
- Coordinates: 30°18′0″S 56°58′0″W
- Country: Uruguay
- Department: Artigas Department
- Time zone: UTC - 3
- Postal code: 55004
- Dial plan: +598 4778 (+4 digits)

Bernabé Rivera is a village in the Artigas Department of northern Uruguay.

== Geography ==
The village is located 20 kilometres (12 mi) northeast into a secondary road leaving off Route 30 at about 60 kilometres (37 mi) west of the department capital Artigas and joining it with the village Topador before returning to Route 30 at a point about 23 kilometres (14 mi) west of Artigas.

== History ==
Its earlier name was "Allende" or "Yacaré", and on 26 May 1924, it was declared a "Pueblo" (village) by the Act of Ley Nº 7.720. It was renamed to "Bernabé Rivera" on 11 January 1956 by the Act of Ley Nº 12.271.

== Population ==
In 2011 Bernabe Rivera had a population of 380.

Year	Population
1908	1,954
1963	683
1975	540
1985	461
1996	421
2004	524
2011	380

Source: Instituto Nacional de Estadística de Uruguay
