= António Manuel da Fonseca =

Portuguese painter, illustrator and theatrical designer

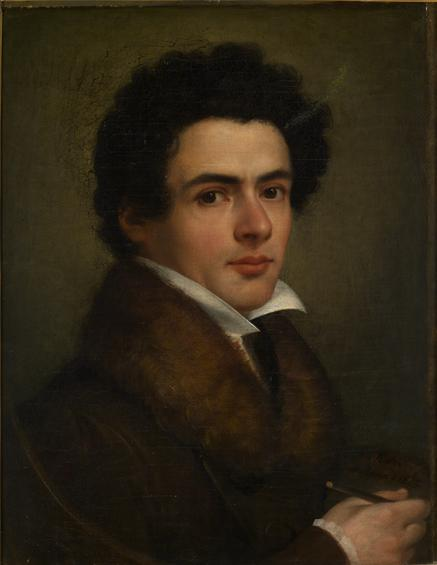
- Self-portrait of Fonseca, 1828
- Born: 27 September 1796; Lisbon
- Died: 4 October 1890 (aged 94); Lisbon
- Occupation: Painter
- Style: History painting

António Manuel da Fonseca (27 September 1796, Lisbon - 4 October 1890, Lisbon) was a Portuguese painter, illustrator and theatrical designer; best known for his mythological and historical scenes.

== Biography ==
His first studies were with his father, João Tomás da Fonseca, who was a painter and sculptor. He then worked at the "Aula de Desenho e de Figura e História", founded by Joaquim Manuel da Rocha (1727-1786).

His first known work is a panel depicting King João VI and Carlota Joaquina, executed in 1820 at the "Palácio das Laranjeiras" for Joaquim Pedro Quintela, 1st Count of Farrobo and his wife. Two years later, he produced a large series of frescoes at the Palácio de Quintela; mostly scenes from the Roman-Sabine wars, landscapes showing Rome and its environs and miscellaneous themes from Greek mythology. In 1878, when he was in his 80s, he returned to do restorative work.

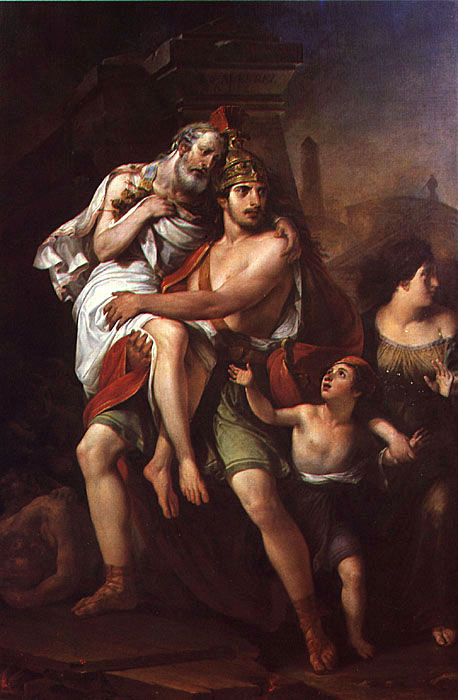
Aeneas Rescuing his Father Anchises (1855)

In 1825, he painted curtains for the Teatro Nacional de São Carlos, followed by a portrait of King Pedro IV. Supported by the King and Count Quintela, he was able to go to Rome, where he made copies of the Old Masters and completed his artistic training with Vincenzo Camuccini and Andrea Pozzi. He also spent time in London and Paris and, when he returned in 1836, he was appointed a Professor of history painting at the "Academia de Belas-Artes" (now part of the University of Lisbon).

In 1838, he designed costumes for a play by Almeida Garrett and did set designs for the opera Robert le diable by Giacomo Meyerbeer. Together with the lithographer, Maurício José Sendim (1786-1870), he created illustrations for the Quadros históricos by António Feliciano de Castilho.

He continued to exhibit frequently, culminating in 1880 at a major exhibition in the "Palácio de Cristal" in Porto. He also served as drawing master to the future King Carlos and his brother Afonso. His many honors include Knighthood in the Order of Christ and the Order of the Immaculate Conception of Vila Viçosa, as well as being a corresponding member of the Institut de France.
