= Mones Quintela =

- Town
- Location in Uruguay
- Coordinates: 30°22′24″S 57°39′50″W
- Country: Uruguay
- Department: Artigas Department

Population (2011)
  - Total: 531
- Time zone: UTC -3
- Postal code: 55100
- Dial plan: +598 4778 (+4 digits)

Mones Quintela is a small town in the Artigas Department of northern Uruguay.

== Geography ==
The town is located about 20 kilometres (12 mi) south of Bella Unión, on the shores of the Uruguay River and the stream Arroyo Itacumbú, just northeast of Cainsa. It is connected to the Route 3 by a local road.

== Origin of name and history ==
The town takes its name from Alfredo Mones Quintela, an agricultural engineer, once a director of the National Federation of Agricultural Cooperative in the 1950s. The CALPICA sugar plant supported the vast majority of the population for a few decades, and was converted into a cooperative irrigation for vegetable and fruit crops and industrial plant is now used as a deposit for rice.

On 5 and 6 November 2010, Mones Quintela held the first festival of sugarcane in Uruguay and commemorated the 25th anniversary of the denomination of Mones Quintela as a town.

== Population ==
In 2011 Mones Quintela had a population of 531.

Year	Population
1996	616
2004	601
2011	531

Source: Instituto Nacional de Estadística de Uruguay
