= Franquia =

- Populated rural area
- Location within Uruguay
- Coordinates: 30°13′20″S 57°35′50″W
- Country: Uruguay
- Department: Artigas Department
- Founded: 1829
- Founder: Fructuoso Rivera

Population (2011)
  - Total: 935
- Time zone: UTC -3
- Postal code: 55100
- Dial plan: +598 4779 (+4 digits)

Franquia is a populated rural area in Artigas Department of northern Uruguay.

== Geography ==
It is located directly north of Bella Unión and northwest of Cuareim.

== Population ==
In 2011 Franquia had a population of 935.

Year	Population
1963	595
1975	376
1985	299
1996	396
2004	833
2011	935

Source: Instituto Nacional de Estadística de Uruguay
