= Flag of Artigas =

Flag of Artigas may refer to:

- Artigas flag - the flag of political leader José Gervasio Artigas, which is one of the national flags of Uruguay and the flag of the Argentine province Entre Ríos
- the flag of the Artigas Department of Uruguay
