= Coronado, Uruguay =

Coronado
- Village
- Location in Uruguay
- Coordinates: 30°16′40″S 57°36′5″W
- Country: Uruguay
- Department: Artigas Department

Population (2011)
  - Total: 438
- Time zone: UTC - 3
- Postal code: 55100
- Dial plan: +598 4779 (+4 digits)

Coronado is a village in the Artigas Department of northern Uruguay. Its name comes from Hipólito Coronado (1840–1876). Its main activity is horticultural production.

== Geography ==
The village is located on the shores of the Uruguay River and shares borders with the south part of Bella Unión, forming a rural suburb of the city.

== History ==
Coronado was established in 1885 with Campodónico and Franqui.

== Population ==
In 2011 Coronado had a population of 438.

Year	Population
1963	360
1975	441
1985	403
1996	373
2004	469
2011	438

Source: Instituto Nacional de Estadística de Uruguay
