= Hina Spani =

Argentine opera singer (died 1969)

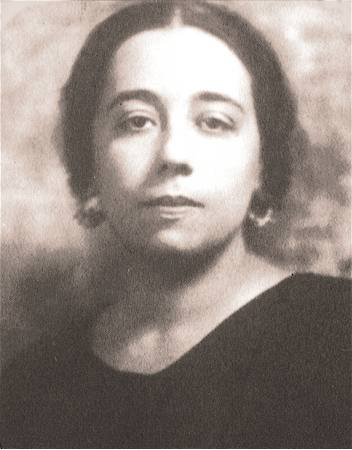
- Born: Higinia Tuñón; 15 February 1890
- Died: 11 July 1969 (aged 79)

Hina Spani (née Higinia Tuñón;15 February 1890 – 11 July 1969) was an Argentine soprano,who was primarily based in Italy and South America during the 1920s and 1930s. After vocal studies in Buenos Aires and Milan, she made her operatic debut at La Scala in 1915 as Anna in Alfredo Catalani's La Wally.

Throughout her career, she performed regularly at the Teatro Colón in Buenos Aires, where she appeared in over 70 roles and collaborated with singers such as Enrico Caruso and Titta Ruffo. In 1924, she was selected by Arturo Toscanini to perform as a soloist at the funeral of Giacomo Puccini at the Milan Cathedral. Her repertoire included the title role in the world premiere of Ottorino Respighi's Maria Egiziaca in 1934.

Spani's recorded legacy includes sessions for Columbia and HMV between 1924 and 1931, which are noted for their technical precision. Following her retirement from the stage in 1940, she taught at the Vocal Art Institute of the Teatro Colón and later served as the director of the School of Music at the University of Buenos Aires.

== Overview ==
Spani was born in Puán, Province of Buenos Aires, an old town located in the pampas of Argentina. When it was discovered that she had a clear, pleasing voice, a landowner from the vicinity of her home town agreed to help her to meet the costs of studying voice, first in Buenos Aires with Amanda Campodónico and later in Milan with Vittorio Moratti.

She made her operatic début at La Scala, Milan, in 1915, in the secondary rôle of Anna in Alfredo Catalani's La Wally. She sang regularly at La Scala—Italy's most important theatre—and in all the leading Italian theaters until 1934. She also toured Australia with a first-rate troupe composed of some of La Scala's leading singers.

At the Teatro Colón she was heard between 1915 and 1940, creating the title part in the world première of Respighi's Maria Egiziaca in 1934, as well as several operas by Argentine composers. She sang over 70 rôles ranging from Ottavia in Monteverdi's 17th century opera L'incoronazione di Poppea to works by then living composers.

After retiring from the operatic stage, she taught at the Vocal Art Institut of the Teatro Colón, which she directed.

Spani died in Buenos Aires on 11 July 1969.

== Recordings ==
Spani recorded some 40 sides for Columbia Records and La voce del padrone. Reissues of her finest 78-rpm recordings can be heard on compact discs, produced by the Preiser and Pearl labels. Marston Records has also reissued her complete recording on a 2-CD set.

== Appreciation ==
Spani's style and technique were typical of a Latin soprano of the 1920-1945 period, but her rich tone was much smoother and her musicianship more subtle than that of most of her contemporaries. She was an outstanding spinto with a constant appreciation of the expressive limits of the music that she sang; as a result, she invested her operatic interpretations with a unique combination of intensity and restraint.

Contemporary accounts of Spani’s performances often noted a discrepancy between her live appearances and her studio work, with critics suggesting that her voice possessed a more expansive quality in a theater setting than was captured by the recording technology of the era. In addition to her operatic career, Spani maintained a large concert repertoire, a focus encouraged by her early vocal training in Buenos Aires. While her discography primarily features operatic arias, she recorded a small selection of art songs. Her recital work was noted by observers for its expressive delivery and cosmopolitan range of material.
