= Mariano Campodónico =

Argentine footballer

Personal information
- Full name: Mariano Alejandro Campodónico
- Date of birth: 4 May 1974 (age 52)
- Place of birth: Adrogué, Argentina
- Height: 1.85 m (6 ft 1 in)
- Position: Forward

Youth career
- Temperley

Senior career*
Years	Team	Apps	(Gls)
1994–1998	Banfield	72	(14)
1998–1999	Platense	17	(0)
1999–2000	San Martín (SJ)	30	(8)
2000–2001	Arsenal de Sarandí	23	(8)
2001–2002	El Porvenir	22	(10)
2002	Caracas	16	(6)
2002–2003	Aucas	25	(10)
2003	Deportivo Quito	16	(7)
2003–2004	Gimnasia y Esgrima	18	(6)
2004	Chiapas	15	(9)
2004–2005	Ferro Carril Oeste	32	(12)
2005–2007	Belgrano		
2007	Nueva Chicago	12	(0)
2007–2008	San Martín (T)	33	(11)
2008–2009	Cerro Porteño	17	(2)
2009	Aldosivi	17	(6)
2009–2010	All Boys	40	(14)
2010–2011	Belgrano	29	(4)
2011–2013	Temperley	44	(10)
2013–2015	Talleres	9	(11)
2015	Mitre	18	(2)
2016–2017	Cañuelas		

Managerial career
- 2018: Cañuelas
- 2018: Luján
- 2019: Sacachispas
- 2020–2021: Huracán (assistant)
- 2021: Talleres RE
- 2024: Temperley
- 2024–: All Boys
- * Club domestic league appearances and goals

Mariano Alejandro Campodónico (born 4 May 1974) is a retired Argentine footballer who played as a forward and current manager of All Boys. He is the brother of former footballer Pablo Campodónico.

== Career ==
Campodónico started his career in 1994, his first club was Banfield, and he remained with them for four years before joining Platense with whom he made 17 appearances. 1999 saw Campodónico leave Platense and complete a move to San Martín (SJ) before subsequently agreeing to join Arsenal de Sarandí in 2000 and El Porvenir in 2001. In 2002, Campodónico moved out of Argentina for the first-team as he agreed to sign for Venezuelan Primera División club Caracas, however his spell with Caracas was short as he soon departed to join Ecuadorian Serie A side Aucas.

One year later he left to join fellow Ecuadorian team Deportivo Quito. Moves to Gimnasia, Chiapas, Ferro Carril Oeste and Belgrano followed between 2003 and 2007. In 2004, Campodónico, playing for Ferro Carril Oeste scored twice against Sarmiento. Sarmiento's goalkeeper was Campodónico's own brother, Pablo. Mariano told reporters that "this was the worst thing that's happened to me in my football career". In 2006, while playing for Belgrano, Campodónico was sentenced to eight days in prison for making "obscene gestures" at the opposing team during a football game.

He joined Nueva Chicago in 2007 and made 12 appearances before leaving not long after joining to complete a transfer to San Martín (T). 6 goals in 10 appearances followed for San Martín (T) before Campodónico moved to Paraguay to play for Cerro Porteño. He was with Cerro Porteño for one season, 2008, before eventually joining Aldosivi, which meant he was at the same team as his brother, Pablo, for the first-time. After leaving Aldosivi, he joined All Boys before then moving to Belgrano (second spell), Temperley and Talleres. Campodónico played for Mitre in 2015 and Cañuelas in 2016 before announcing his retirement.

== Coaching career ==
Retiring in the summer of 2017, Campodónico began his coaching career at his last club as a player, Cañuelas, where he was appointed manager on 28 December 2017. However, he decided to resign on 19 June 2018.

A few days after leaving Cañuelas, Campodónico was appointed manager of Club Luján at the end of June 2018. After only two victories, four draws and seven defeats, he was fired on 15 October 2018.

On 3 February 2019, Campodónico was appointed manager of Sacachispas FC. He left his position on 16 September 2019.

After Israel Damonte was appointed manager of Huracán on 3 January 2020, Campodónico also joined the club as his assistant coach, alongside his brother, Pablo Campodónico, who was appointed goalkeeper coach. They left in March 2021

== Honours ==
=== Club ===
San Martín (T)

- Primera B Nacional (1): 2007–08
