= Maurizio Bensaude =

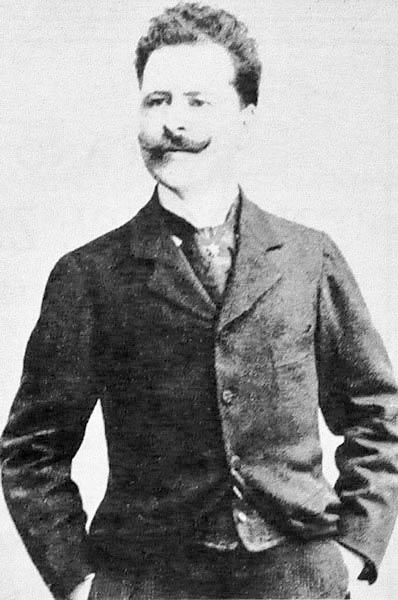
Maurizio Bensaude

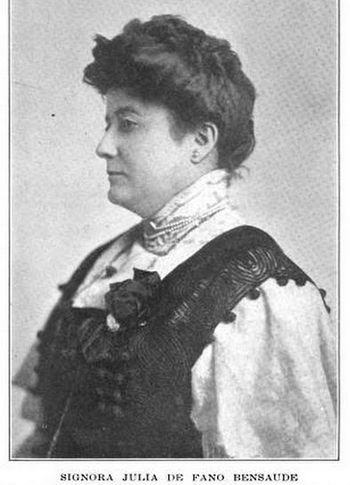
His wife, Spanish soprano Julia de Fano Bensaúde, from a 1908 publication.

Maurício (Moisés) Bensaúde (also known professionally as Maurizio Bensaude) (13 February 1863, in Ponta Delgada – 22 December 1912, in Lisbon), was a Portuguese operatic baritone. He arrived in Lisbon in 1884, where he received vocal training for a short time, and then made his debut in the same year at the Teatro da Trindade in Lisbon, in the opérette La petite mariée by Charles Lecocq. He then worked in another operetta at the Portuguese capital, in the Teatro de D. Maria, where he appeared in operettas and musical comedies. However, he continued to take singing lessons, and began to take on operatic roles as well at the end of the 1880s. He quickly became a success, and went on to have extensive international guest appearances.

In 1896, he sang at the Teatro Costanzi in Rome, playing Riccardo in Bellini's I Puritani in 1897, and playing Gunther in Twilight of the Gods. In the 1893–94 and 1898–99 seasons, he was engaged at the Metropolitan Opera in New York, where he served as Amonasro in the debut of Aida. In 1899, he performed at the Teatro Regio in Turin, and in 1900, he performed at the Covent Garden Opera in London as Amonasro and as Figaro in Barber of Seville. He also had other guest appearances at the Berlin Court Opera, the Teatro Argentina in Rome, Paris and Milan, at the Odessa Opera, and in Zagreb. In 1902 he toured major Australian cities as part of the Melba Australian Concert Tour. He also toured through Brazil and the United States.

In 1910, he gave up his stage career. At times he worked as the head of an opera troupe, with whom he held opera performances in Portugal. He worked as a teacher and was active in the management of the Teatro de São Carlos in Lisbon, but he died two years after his farewell stage.

Bensaude was married to the opera singer Julia de Fano. His repertoire for the stage included Enrico in Lucia di Lammermoor, Germont in La Traviata, Lescaut in Manon by Massenet, the Escamillo in Carmen, Marcello in Puccini's La Boheme, and Alfio in Cavalleria Rusticana.

== US career ==
Although Bensaude was primarily active in Europe, he had more than a passing career in the United States. He made his debut at New York's Metropolitan Opera on November 23, 1894, as Amonasro in Verdi's Aida, and his debut in Philadelphia on the following December 18 in the same role. he would remain a member of the Metropolitan company for the remainder of the season. At least at first he made little impression in New York, where critics described his voice as "pleasant" or "tolerable"; The New York Times, in a generally mixed review of the production, indicated the artist "lacks distinction, both vocally and dramatically." Perhaps Bensaude was overshadowed by other developments; the Aida soprano Libia Drog was attempting to erase memories of her own unsuccessful New York debut two days earlier in Rossini's William Tell, when she was so stricken by stage fright that she froze onstage and was unable to perform, and the Rhadames, Francesco Tamagno, drew critical reproval for "bawling" his part over the footlights.

== Notes ==
This article contains information translated from Maurício Bensaúde on the Portuguese Wikipedia, where the following references were given:

- João de Freitas Branco: O Barítono Maurício Bensaúde. In: Arte Musical, n.º 29, Lisboa, 1963.
- J. M. Abecassis: Genealogia Hebraica. Portugal e Gibraltar, séculos XVII a XX, vol. II, "Bensaúde" §1, n.º 5. Lisboa: Liv. Ferin, 1990.
- The Sembrich Opera Company Tour of 1901, HERX Opera Quarterly 1995; 12: 47-64.
