= Peregrina Quintela Estévez =

Spanish mathematician

Peregrina Quintela Estévez (born 1960) is a Spanish applied mathematician. She is a professor of applied mathematics at the University of Santiago de Compostela, the founding director of the Spanish Network for Mathematics and Industry, and the winner of the 2016 María Josefa Wonenburger Planells prize of the Galician government.

== Education and career ==
Quintela earned a bachelor's degree in mathematics from the University of Santiago de Compostela in 1982, a PhD from the Autonomous University of Madrid in 1986, and a second doctorate from the University of Paris in 1988. Her 1988 dissertation, Sur Quelques Question D'elasticité Non Linéaire et de Théorie de Plaques [On Some Questions of Nonlinear Elasticity and Plate Theory] was supervised by Philippe G. Ciarlet.

She has been chair of the Spanish Network for Mathematics and Industry since it was founded in 2011. She is also director of the Technological Institute for Industrial Mathematics (ITMATI), founded in 2013.

== Books ==
With four co-authors, Quintela wrote the book TransMath: Innovative Solutions from Mathematical Technology (Springer, 2012) on technology transfer in mathematics. She is also the author of two books on MATLAB published through her university, and of two Spanish-language textbooks on differential equations and on numerical methods in engineering, published by Tórculo Ediciones in 2000 and 2001, as well as the editor of several conference proceedings.

== Recognition ==
In 2016, the Government of Galicia gave Quintela their María Josefa Wonenburger Planells prize, given "to highlight the outstanding careers of women in the field of science and technology".
