= Joaquim Pedro Quintela, 1st Count of Farrobo =

Portuguese aristocrat and businessman

His Excellency The Count of Farrobo ComC GCNSC
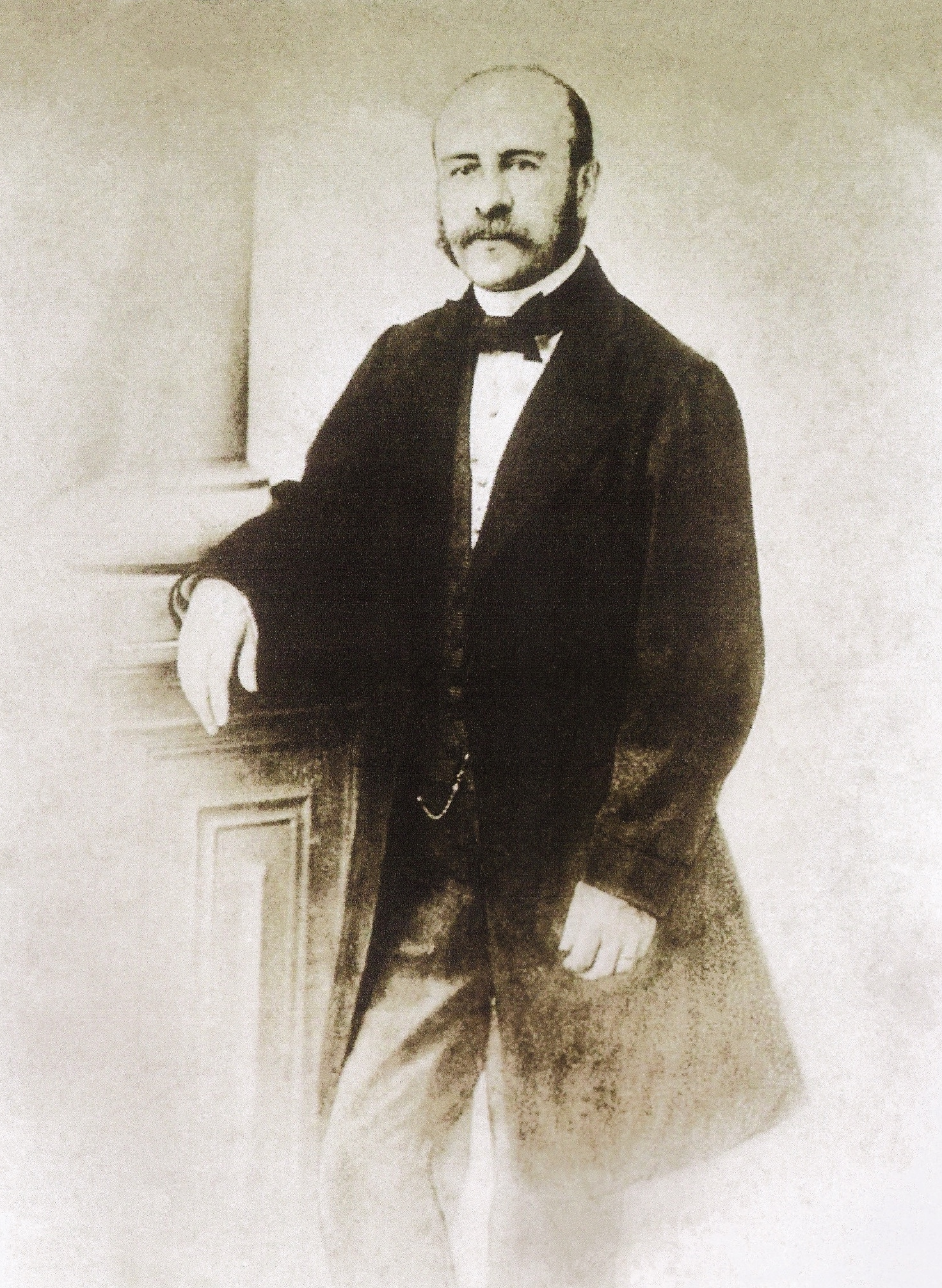

Peer of the Realm
- In office 2 September 1834 – 24 September 1869
- Monarch: Maria II

Personal details
- Born: 11 December 1801 Encarnação, Lisbon, Portugal
- Died: 24 September 1869 (aged 67) Encarnação, Lisbon, Portugal
- Spouses: Mariana Carlota Lodi (m. 1819; died 1867); Marie Madeleine Pignault (m. 1869)
- Occupation: Businessman

D. Joaquim Pedro Quintela, 1st Count of Farrobo (11 December 1801 – 24 September 1869) was a Portuguese aristocrat and businessman, the heir and successor of the great capitalist and landowner of the same name, Joaquim Pedro Quintela, 1st Baron of Quintela. Farrobo was a noted philanthropist and patron of the arts.

== Biography ==
=== Early life ===
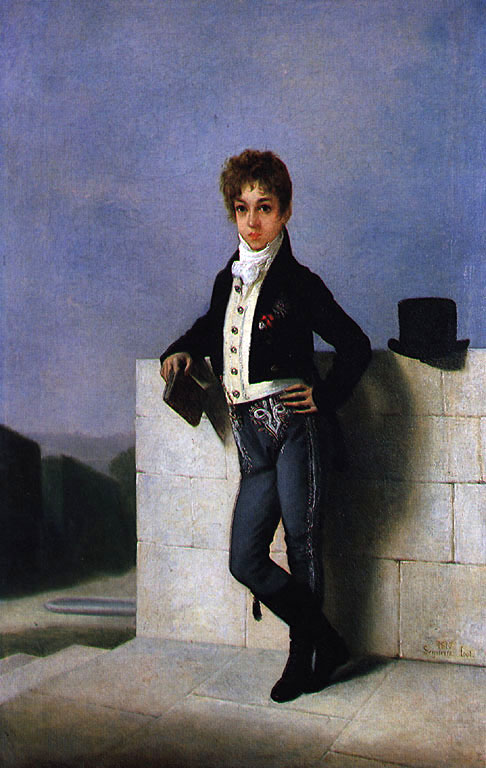
Portrait of the Count of Farrobo, 1813, by Domingos Sequeira. National Museum of Ancient Art.

Farrobo, named after his father, was the son of the Baron of Quintela, Joaquim Pedro Quintela, and his wife D. Maria Joaquina Xavier de Saldanha. He was very fond of the arts ever since a young age; he became an accomplished amateur musician, playing in João Domingos Bomtempo's Philharmonic Society, modelled after the London Royal Philharmonic Society. He sang, played the cello, the bass, and was a French horn soloist. His passion for music led him, later in life, to hire a bandleader to assemble an orchestra in his own household, composed of his multiple servants.

On 19 May 1819, aged 18, he married Mariana Carlota Lodi, a Dame of the Order of Saint Elizabeth and the daughter of Francisco António Lodi, the first impresario of São Carlos Theatre. This union produced seven children: Maria Joaquina Quintela Farrobo (b. 1819), Maria Carlota Quintela (b. 1821), Maria Madalena Quintela (b. 1822), Joaquim Pedro Quintela, 2nd Count of Farrobo (b. 1823), Maria Ana Hortense de Quintela (b. 1825), Maria Palmira Quintela (b. 1826), and Francisco Jaime Quintela, later 1st Viscount of Charruada (b. 1827).

His father died on 1 October 1817, and he succeeded him as the 2nd Baron of Quintela on 3 November 1819.

=== The Civil War ===
In 1828, the Portuguese Civil War was triggered after Miguel of Braganza seized power and was acclaimed absolute king setting aside the Constitutional Charter of 1826. Quintela espoused Liberal ideals and, in 1831, he notably refused to offer a loan to the Miguelist side and was at once stripped of all his honours and privileges by decree: fearing for his life, he took refuge on board an English vessel anchored in the Tagus, disguised as a British naval officer; the rest of his family remained in the family palace in Rua do Alecrim, parish of Encarnação, above which now flew the Union Jack to prevent the residence from being stormed by the Absolutist forces. Quintela sold all his assets to a British friend, Lord William Russell, and hid in the house of Diogo Carlos Duff, in Prazeres, assuming the false name of "Mr. Smith". Around this time, he offered large sums to the Liberal faction, at the time perilously close to defeat and besieged in the city of Porto.

When the Liberal army took the city of Lisbon in 1833 and all but won the Civil War, its leader, Peter, Duke of Braganza, went immediately to Quintela in recognition of his relevant services. The title of Count of Farrobo was granted to him on 4 April 1833, the 14th birthday of the restored constitutional queen, Maria II.

The Count of Farrobo was made a member of the Chamber of the Most Worthy Peers of the Realm by royal charter on 1 September 1834; he was formally sworn in the following day.

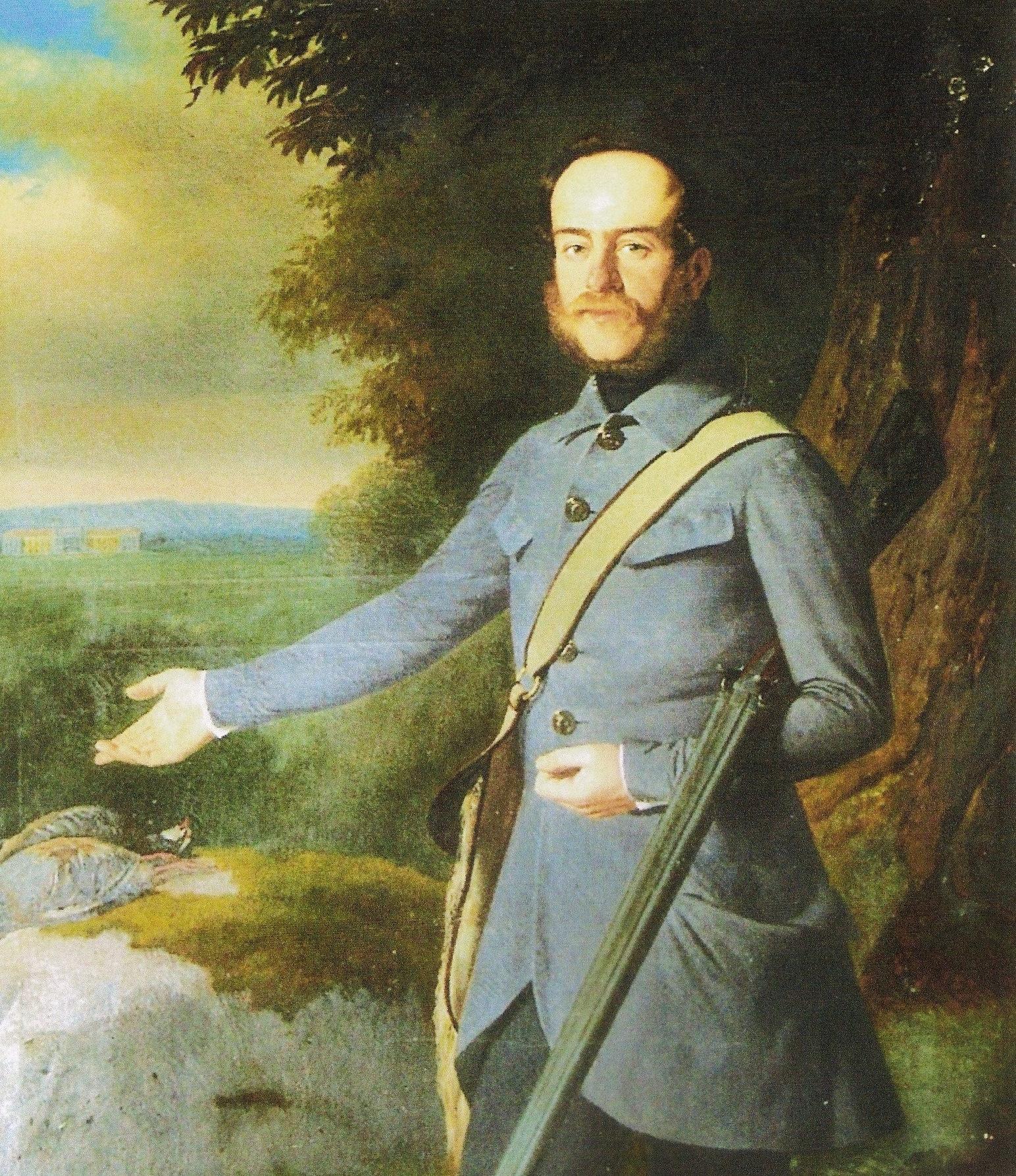
The Count of Farrobo as a huntsman, by Thomas Lawrence

=== After the war ===
Following the Civil War, during the Constitutional Monarchy, Farrobo amassed great wealth and influence owing to his intense activity in the world of industry and business. Some of his business interests included the glassworks factory of Marinha Grande, the chemical plant in Verdelha, Forte da Casa, silk mills, coal mines, the "Bonança" and "União Comercial" insurance companies, "Vulcano" metalworks, and the North and East Railway Company.

The Count of Farrobo was not less notable as a well-known protector of the Arts in his day. He himself supported the artistic education abroad of António Manuel da Fonseca and Joaquim Pedro de Sousa, in Rome and Paris, respectively.

By decree of 3 October 1848, the Count of Farrobo was made Inspector-General of the Theatres and Director of the Royal Conservatory of Lisbon, at a time the institution was struggling severely. In mid-1838, he became the impresario of São Carlos Theatre, ushering in a notable season that saw the national premieres of Robert the Devil (2 September 1838), and Mozart's Don Giovanni (6 January 1839): he left the position in late 1840, in severe debt (of more than 90.000 réis). It was through Farrobo's influence that the distinguished Italian maestros Pietro Antonio Coppola and Angelo Frondoni came to Portugal.

Even though the Count of Farrobo had an inquestionable role in the political, social, and cultural life of Portugal, he is perhaps best remembered today for his legendary parties of great opulence and excess. Some claim that the Portuguese word farrobodó (meaning a big, raucous party or event) derives from Farrobo.

==== Thalia Theatre ====
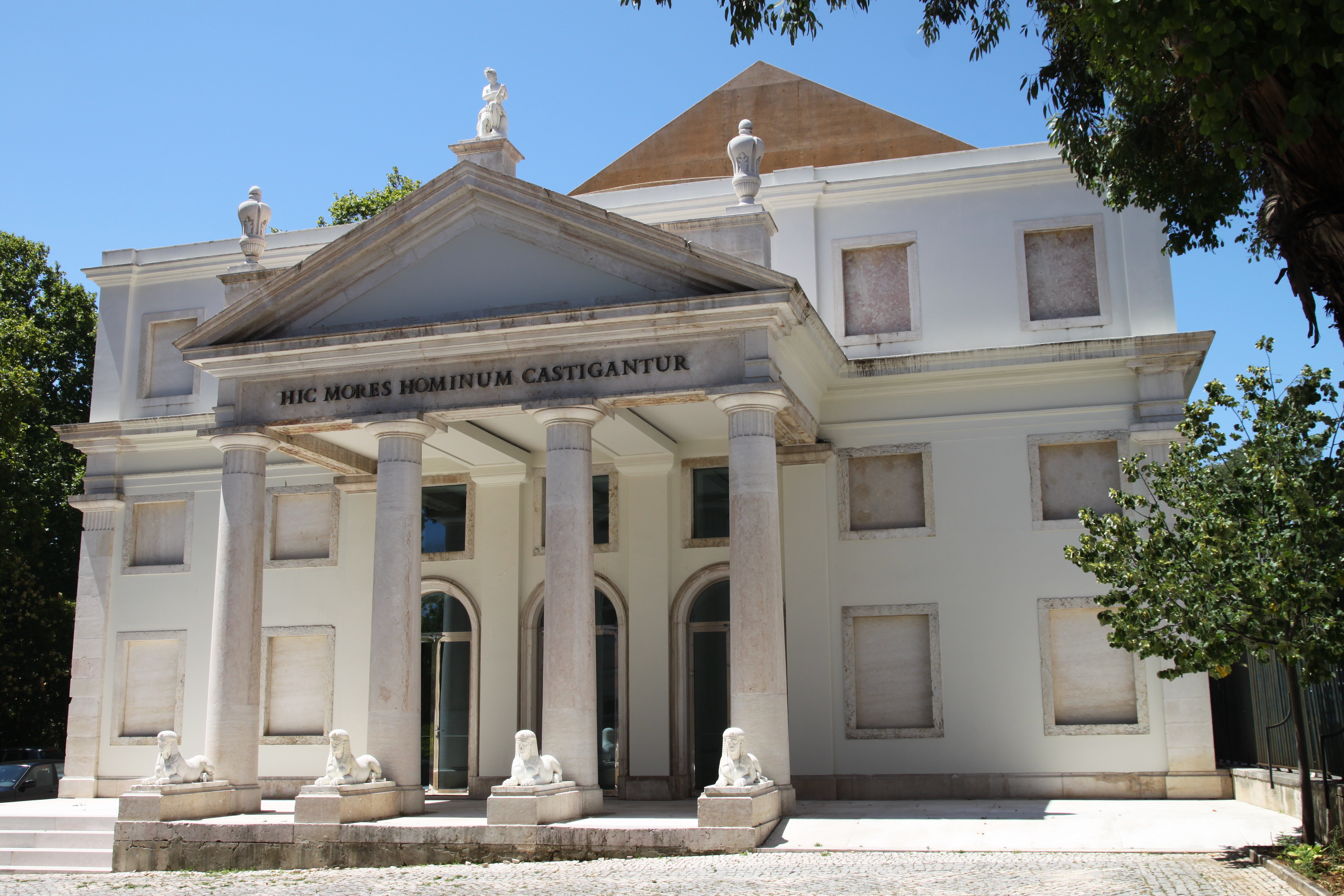
The ruins of Thalia Theatre were reconverted in 2008-2012 into a modern, multipurpose space for shows and events.

In 1820, he had an elegant theatre — Thalia Theatre — built in his vast Laranjeiras estate, in São Domingos de Benfica (which is nowadays mostly occupied by Lisbon Zoo). The theatre, inscribed over the entrance "hic mores hominum castigantur", became famous for the opulent functions it frequently hosted, though they were interrupted by the political agitation of the Civil War in the late 1820s and early 1830s.

The Theatre was renovated in 1842, when it was fully gaslit, long before the public streetlights of Lisbon. The Theatre had the reputation of being the most distinguished and sophisticated salon in the capital; Queen Maria II herself was rather fond of the fêtes there and, following her death in 1853, the functions were interrupted temporarily out of respect.

On 9 September 1862, the theatre completely burned down after a fire broke out by accident while workers were inside welding a skylight; the theatre was never rebuilt, as it coincided with Farrobo's financial collapse.

=== Later life ===
A life of opulence and some misfortunes in business (the last drop of which was the loss of the monopoly on the country's tobacco and a ruinous compensation after 30 years of litigation with capitalist Manuel Joaquim Pimenta) meant that in his later life, most of Farrobo's fortune was lost.

His wife, D. Mariana Lodi, died on 22 July 1867, on his Laranjeiras estate; Farrobo remarried, on 7 February 1869, to Marie Madeleine Pignault, from whom he already had three children: Júlio Maria Quintela (1855–1911), Maria Joaquina Quintela (1856–?), and Carlos Pedro Quintela (1866–?).

== Distinctions ==
=== National orders ===
- Commander of the Order of Christ
- Grand Cross of the Order of the Immaculate Conception of Vila Viçosa
