= Pablo Campodónico =

Argentine footballer

Personal information
- Full name: Pablo Javier Campodónico
- Date of birth: 17 October 1977 (age 49)
- Place of birth: Buenos Aires, Argentina
- Height: 1.84 m (6 ft 0 in)
- Position: Goalkeeper

Youth career
- Temperley

Senior career*
Years	Team	Apps	(Gls)
1997–2003	Temperley		
2003–2005	Sarmiento	62	(0)
2005–2006	Temperley		
2006–2007	Platense	38	(0)
2007–2017	Aldosivi	288	(0)
2017–2018	UAI Urquiza	2	(0)
2018–2019	Temperley	6	(0)
- * Club domestic league appearances and goals

Pablo Javier Campodónico (born 17 October 1977) is an Argentine former professional footballer who played as a goalkeeper. He is the brother of former footballer Mariano Campodónico.

He currently performs as a goalkeeper trainer for Club Atlético Boca Juniors.

== Career ==
=== Club ===
Campodónico began his career in 1997 with Temperley, with whom he stayed with for six years before joining Sarmiento in 2003 but only to return to Temperley two years later; however, he did win the 2003–04 Primera B Metropolitana while with Sarmiento. In 2004, Pablo conceded two goals in one match against his brother Mariano who describes it as "the worst thing that's happened to me in my football career". Pablo and his brother later played together for Aldosivi when Mariano was with the club in 2009. In 2006, Campodónico left Temperley again as he agreed to join Platense. After a season with the club he departed to join Aldosivi. As of the end of the 2016 season he has made 286 league appearances for Aldosivi.

== Coaching career ==
After retiring at the age of 41, Campodónico began as a goalkeeper coach at Aldosivi, where he trained the women's teams. Alongside that, he also ran a mini-academy, where he trained young goalkeepers.

When Israel Damonte was appointed manager of Huracán on 3 January 2020, Campodónico also joined the club as a goalkeeper coach, alongside his brother, Mariano Campodónico, who was appointed assistant coach. They left in March 2021

== Career statistics ==
=== Club ===
As of 31 October 2016.

Club statistics
Club	Season	League			Cup (Note: Includes the Copa Argentina)		League Cup		Continental (Note: Includes the Copa Libertadores and Copa Sudamericana)		Other		Total	
Club	Season	Division	Apps	Goals	Apps	Goals	Apps	Goals	Apps	Goals	Apps	Goals	Apps	Goals
Aldosivi	2007–08	Primera B Nacional	9	0	0	0	—		—		0	0	9	0
Aldosivi	2008–09	Primera B Nacional	37	0	0	0	—		—		0	0	37	0
Aldosivi	2009–10	Primera B Nacional	37	0	0	0	—		—		0	0	37	0
Aldosivi	2010–11	Primera B Nacional	36	0	0	0	—		—		0	0	36	0
Aldosivi	2011–12	Primera B Nacional	38	0	0	0	—		—		0	0	38	0
Aldosivi	2012–13	Primera B Nacional	36	0	1	0	—		—		0	0	37	0
Aldosivi	2013–14	Primera B Nacional	36	0	0	0	—		—		0	0	36	0
Aldosivi	2014	Primera B Nacional	16	0	0	0	—		—		0	0	16	0
Aldosivi	2015	Primera División	33	0	1	0	—		—		0	0	34	0
Aldosivi	2016	Primera División	8	0	1	0	—		—		0	0	9	0
Aldosivi	2016–17	Primera División	0	0	0	0	—		—		0	0	0	0
Aldosivi	Total		286	0	3	0	—		—		0	0	289	0
Career total			286	0	3	0	—		—		0	0	289	0

== Honours ==
=== Club ===
Sarmiento

- Primera B Metropolitana (1): 2003–04
