= Rodolfo Campodónico =

Mexican composer

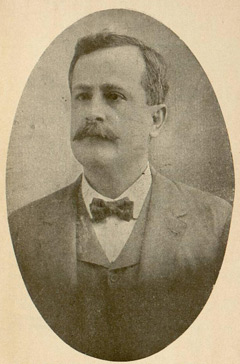
Rodolfo Campodónico

Rodolfo Víctor Manuel Pío Campodónico Morales was one of the first composers of waltzes in Mexico.

== Life and career ==
He was born in Hermosillo, Sonora in 1866. Campodónico began composing at the age of eight and was directing various musical bands in Guaymas and Hermosillo when still a child. Despite the waltz’s romantic character, his pieces often had a political and rebellious tendency. One of his major works, "El club verde", is dedicated to the color green. At that time, green was the color of the Club Antirreeleccionists Garcia Morales, opposed to the continued regime of Porfirio Díaz. Other works that gained fame include "Herminia", "Eloísa", "Recuerdos a Virginia", "Blanco y negro", "Tuya", "Viva Maytorena", and "Tus ojos and Proyectos". Campodónico died in Douglas, Arizona in 1926.
