= Joaquim Pedro Quintela, 1st Baron of Quintela =

Portuguese businessman and landowner

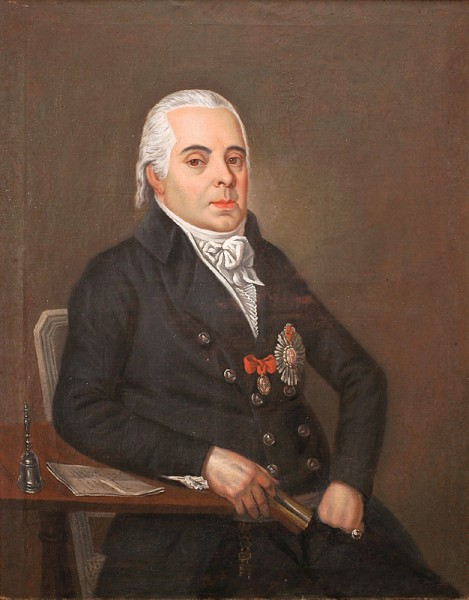
The Baron of Quintela

D. Joaquim Pedro Quintela, 1st Baron of Quintela CvC (20 August 1748 – 1 October 1817) was an important Portuguese businessman and landowner.

In March 1782, he inherited the estate of his parents and maternal uncle, thus propelling his ascent to the position of the most important capitalist in the country. To prevent the fortune from being divided by several heirs in the future, he instituted the Majorat of Quintela in 1791. He was ennobled by royal decree on 17 August 1805, when he received the title of Baron of Quintela.

He was married to D. Maria Joaquina Xavier de Saldanha (d. 1805), and they had two children: Maria Gertrudes Quintela (later the Countess of Cunha, by marriage) and Joaquim Pedro Quintela, who later inherited the barony and was made Count of Farrobo in 1833. Quintela also had a bastard daughter, Joaquina Rosa (1793–1823), recognised in 1812.

== Distinctions ==
=== National orders ===
- Knight of the Order of Christ
