= Artigas Department =

Department of Uruguay

Artigas
- Department
- Flag Coat of arms

- Location of Artigas Department in Uruguay
- Coordinates (Artigas): 30°28′S 56°28′W
- Country: Uruguay
- Inception: 1884
- Capital of Department: Artigas

Government
  - Intendant: Pablo Caram Murillo
  - Ruling party: Partido Nacional

Area
  - Total: 11,928 km^{2} (4,605 sq mi)
- Elevation: 100 m (330 ft)
- Demonym: Artiguense
- Time zone: UTC-3 (UYT)
- ISO 3166 code: UY-AR
- Website: www.artigas.gub.uy

Artigas Department (Spanish: Departamento de Artigas) is the northernmost department of Uruguay. Its capital is the city of Artigas, which borders the Brazilian city of Quaraí. Artigas Department has an area of 11,928 square kilometres (4,605 sq mi), making it the fifth largest in the country. The population is 77,487 inhabitants, according to the 2023 census.

It is bordered on the north and east by Brazil, from which it is separated by the Cuareim River. To the south, Artigas Department borders on Salto Department, and to the west is Argentina, from which it is separated by the Uruguay River. Artigas is the only Uruguayan department that borders two other countries.

The department and its capital city are named after José Gervasio Artigas (1764–1850), leader of the Orientales (inhabitants of the Banda Oriental, the Eastern bank of the Uruguay River) during Uruguay's wars of independence.

== History ==
In Pre-Columbian times a local industry developed here, known as Hombre del Catalanense.

Owner region of a prehistoric past which later became "no man's land" between the Spanish and Portuguese empires. The initial indigenous predominance (chanás-charrúas-Guarani) was displaced by the native settlement and subsequent colonies of immigrants.

Artigas department was created by law on 1 October 1884, on territory previously belonged to the department of Salto; from that date it is designated to Villa de San Eugenio as capital, which in 1915 passed to the category of city with the name of Artigas, capital of the department with the same name in tribute to the national hero of Uruguay José Gervasio Artigas. He was linked to the fact Colonel Carlos Lecueder, first politician and police chief Artigas.

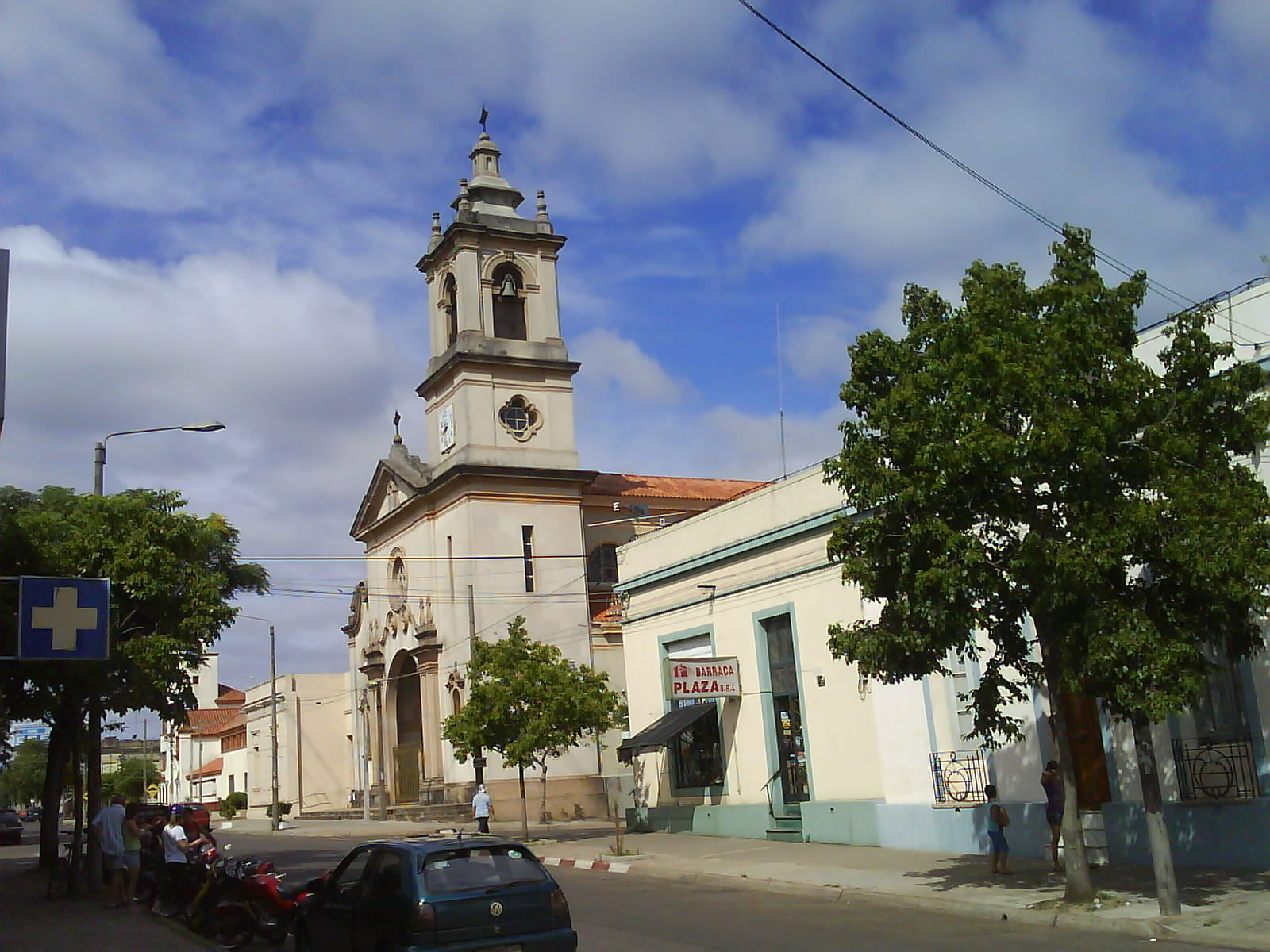
Sacred Heart Church

Its capital Artigas comes at the end of the "Guerra Grande" in order to consolidate the borders with Brazil, with the name of San Eugenio del Cuareim. It was founded on September 12, 1852 by Don Carlos Catala, choosing as the best site located on the banks of the Cuareim River opposite the Villa San Juan Bautista on the other side of the river, which was a military settlement that was then transformed into what is today the city of Quaraí.

A city named Santa Rosa del Cuareim, now known as Bella Unión, was founded by Fructuoso Rivera and Guarani refugees after the Eastern Missions campaign against Brazil in 1829 (see: Thirty-Three Orientals). After winning the allies Colorados Brazil national in 1852, territory north of Cuareim was yielded to Brazil which prompted an evacuation of the population. It was re-founded in 1853 under the name of Santa Rosa de la Bella Unión Quareim. In 1929, the national government to mark the centenary of the campaign of Missions, sent a bill to the Senate, which established the name Bella Unión, which for that time was a villa.

== Geography ==
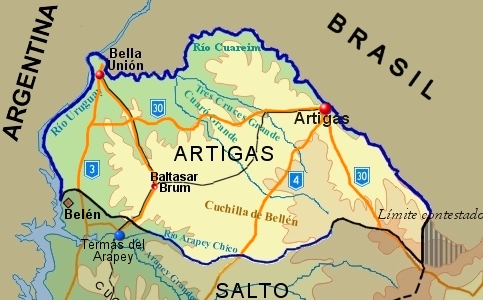
Topographic map of Artigas Department showing main populated places and roads

Two portions of the department's border with Brazil are disputed (Isla Brasilera or Brazilian Island near Bella Unión, and an area called Rincón de Artigas near Masoller), but unlike many border disputes between Latin American countries, this issue has not strained Uruguay's relations with Brazil, which remain friendly.

Two main geostructural regions can be found inside Artigas' limits:

- The central and eastern area, which includes a basaltic cuesta, and some sedimentary plains near the Cuareim River. Also found in the region are some hill ranges, such as Cuchilla de Belén.
- The western area, which consists of a narrow alluvial plain.

Artigas Department's average temperature is the highest in the whole country (over 19 °C or 66 °F, and may go as high as 47 °C or 116 °F during the summer months). So are its precipitation levels (up to an annual average of 1400 mm).

== Economy ==
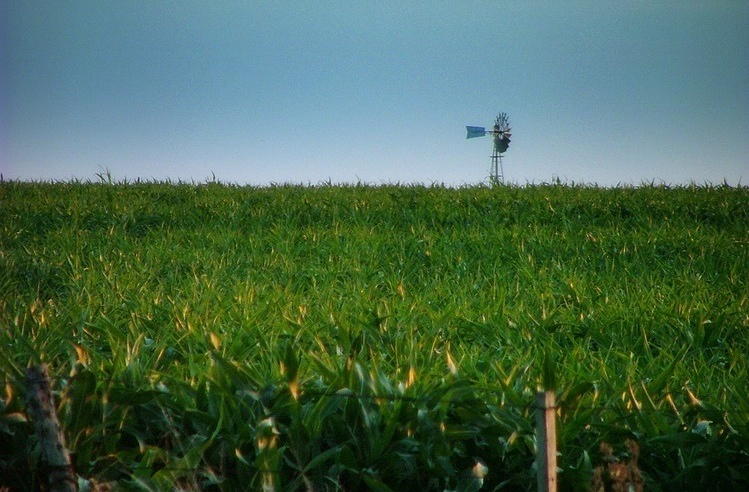
Plantations in Bella Unión, north of Artigas.

The unique climatic conditions of Artigas has made possible the development of an important agro-industrial centre around the city of Bella Unión. Several crops are planted, namely fruits and vegetables, sugar cane, and rice. In the rest of the department, the main economic activity is livestock raising.

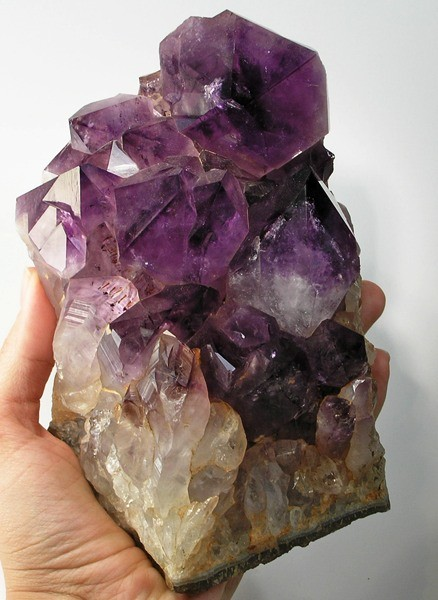
A cluster of amethyst quartz mined from Artigas, Uruguay.

Semi-precious gemstones, such as agates and amethysts, are also found in the department, and an entire industry has risen up around their extraction and manufacturing, especially near the capital city of Artigas.

The largest amethyst geode worldwide was discovered in Artigas in 2007, called the Empress of Uruguay. It stands at a height of 3.27 meters and weighs 2.5 tons. It is currently on display at The Crystal Caves museum in Atherton, Queensland, Australia.

The proximity of the department to Brazil has made it possible for an important flow of trade to be established here, but unfortunately this is generally unfavorable to Uruguayan economic interests. Nevertheless, this partially compensates for the fact that the per capita income is the lowest of the country, and the percentage of households in poverty is the highest in the country (13.19% of the inhabitants).

== Demographics ==
Ethnic groups in Artigas (2023 est.)
Ethnic groups	Percent
White	71.1%
Black	21.8%
Indigenous	7.4%
Asian	1.2%
None/Other/Unspecified	9.1%

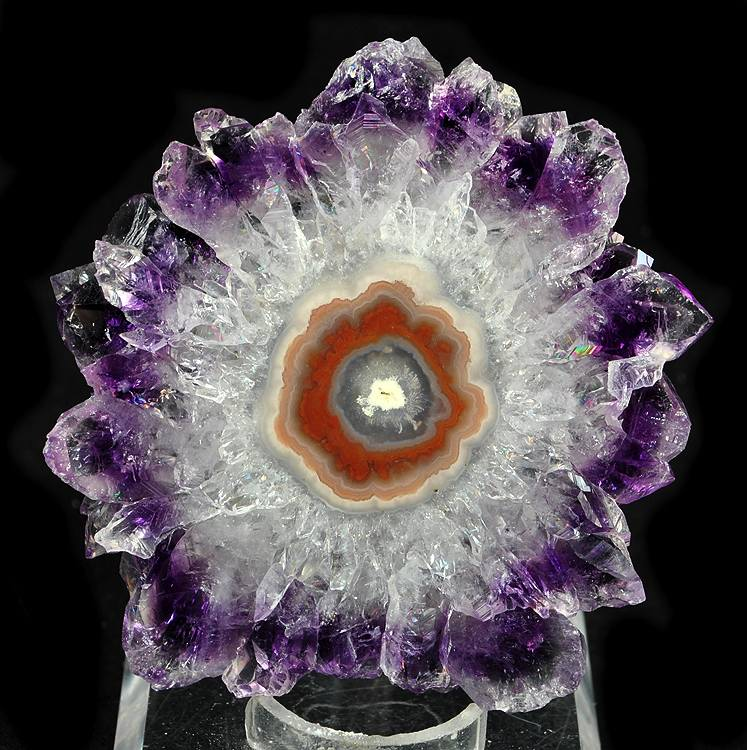
A polished slice of an amethyst stalactite from Artigas Department

As of the census of 2011, the Artigas Department had a population of 73,378 (36,079 male and 37,299 female) and 26,231 households.

Demographic data for Artigas Department in 2010:

- Population growth rate: -0,006%
- Birth Rate: 15.48 births/1,000 people
- Death Rate: 7.05 deaths/1,000 people
- Average age: 28.2 (27.2 male, 29.2 female)
- Life Expectancy at Birth:
  - Total population: 75.43 years
  - Male; 72.03 years
  - Female: 79.35 years
- Average per household income: 19,273 pesos/month
- Urban per capita income: 6,994 pesos/month

2010 Data Source:

Main Urban Centres
Other towns and villages
Population stated according to the 2011 census.

City / Town	Population
Artigas	40,658
Bella Unión	12,200
Las Piedras	2,771
Tomás Gomensoro	2,659
Baltasar Brum	2,531
Pintadito	1,642
Sequeira	1,149

Town / Village	Population
Franquia	935
Cerro Ejido	790
Cuareim	710
Mones Quintela	531
Colonia Palma	440

Town / Village	Population
Coronado	438
Cerro San Eugenio	425
Bernabé Rivera	380
Cainsa	355
Portones de Hierro y Campodónico	323

Rural population

According to the 2011 census, Artigas department has a rural population of 3,524.

== See also ==
- List of populated places in Uruguay#Artigas Department
- Uruguayan-Brazilian border dispute
- Highly detailed map of Artigas Department (2405×1949px)
  showing all populated places and full geographic details.
  See full size version in Commons.

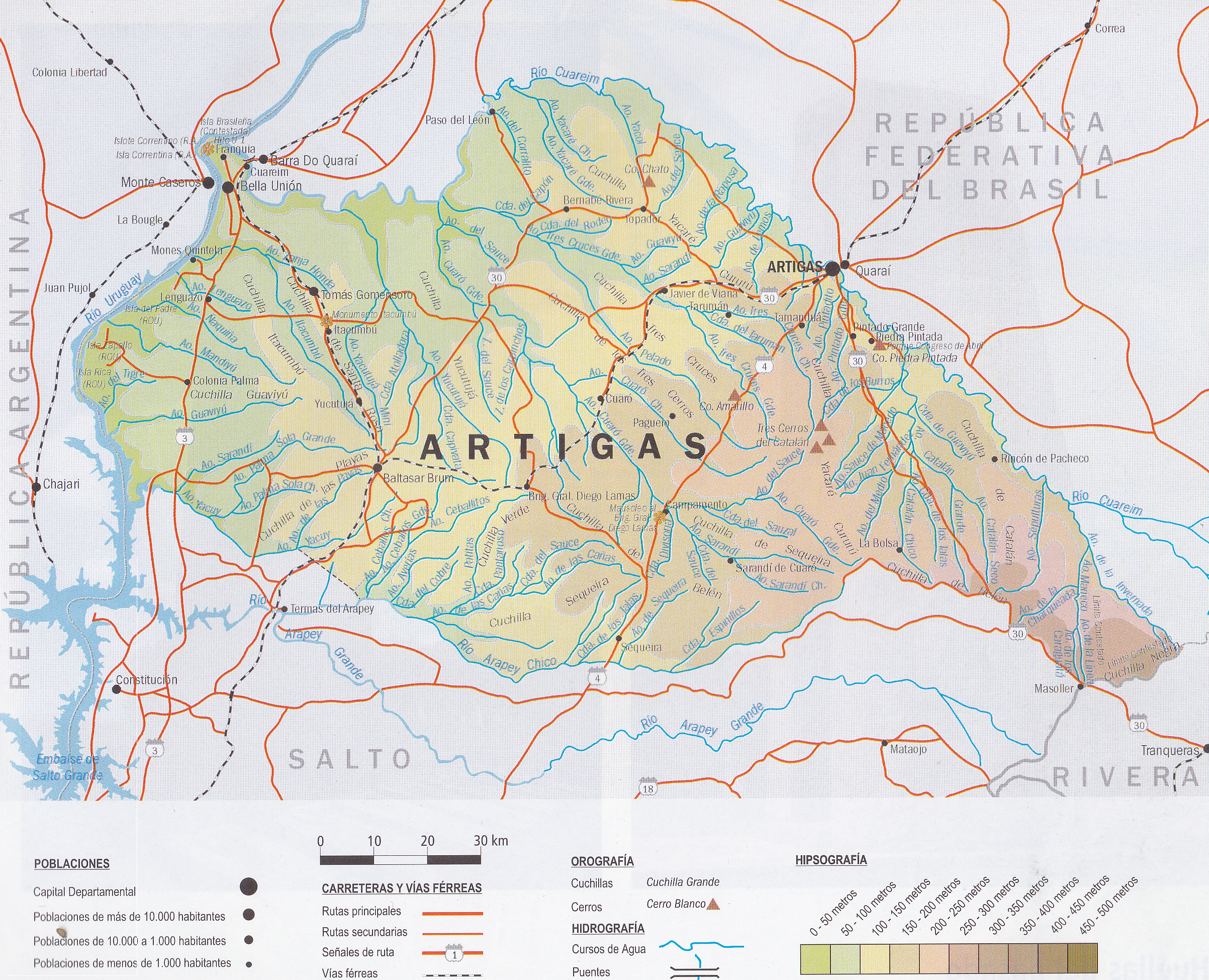

== Bibliography ==
- Domínguez, Carlos María (2004). El norte profundo (in Spanish). Montevideo: Ediciones de la Banda Oriental.
