= Cuareim =

- Village
- Location in Uruguay
- Coordinates: 30°13′30″S 57°34′5″W
- Country: Uruguay
- Department: Artigas Department

Population (2011)
  - Total: 710
- Time zone: UTC - 3
- Postal code: 55100
- Dial plan: +598 4779 (+4 digits)

Cuareim is a village in the Artigas Department of northern Uruguay.

== Geography ==
It is located on the shores of the Cuareim River and is northeast of Bella Unión, forming a rural suburb of the city.

== Population ==
In 2011 Cuareim had a population of 710.

Year	Population
1963	369
1975	372
1985	455
1996	688
2004	780
2011	710

Source: Instituto Nacional de Estadística de Uruguay
