= Bella Unión =

- City
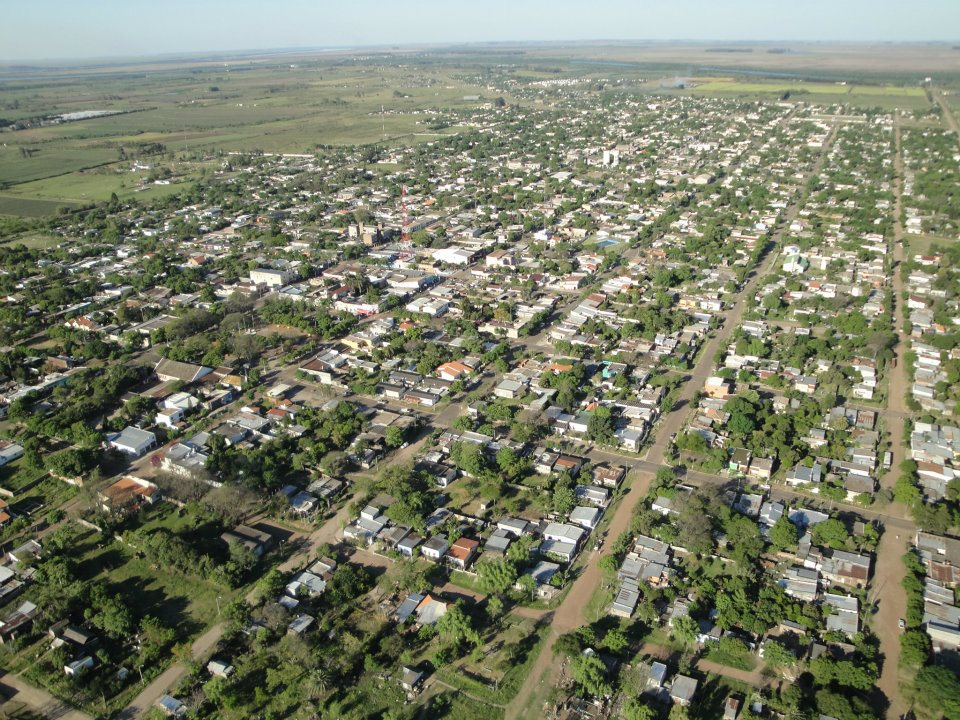
- Bella Unión, Uruguay

- Location in Uruguay
- Coordinates: 30°15′0″S 57°35′0″W
- Country: Uruguay
- Department: Artigas
- Founded: 1829; 197 years ago
- Founder: Fructuoso Rivera

Population (2011 Census)
  - Total: 12,200
- Time zone: UTC -3
- Postal code: 55100
- Dial plan: +598 4779 (+4 digits)

Bella Unión is a city in the north part of Artigas Department of Uruguay.

== History ==
The original settlement was founded on 13 May 1829 under the name "Santa Rosa". It was started by Fructuoso Rivera, who played a prominent role in the early history of Uruguay. On 20 April 1928, it was renamed to "Bella Unión" by the Act of Ley No. 8.207. On 15 October 1963, its status was raised to "Ciudad" (city) by the Act of Ley No. 13.180.

== Population ==
In 2011, Bella Unión had a population of 12,200. Together with its peripheral populated and rural areas (Coronado, Portones de Hierro y Campodónico, Las Piedras, Franquia & Cuareim) they form a population centre of around 18,000.

Year	Population
1908	5,414
1963	4,955
1975	7,778
1985	12,238
1996	13,537
2004	13,187
2011	12,200

Source: Instituto Nacional de Estadística de Uruguay

== Geography ==
It is located at the north end of Route 3, on the banks of the Uruguay River, near the mouth of Río Cuareim. Being situated on a piece of land protruding between Argentina and Brazil, it lies across Monte Caseros, Corrientes of Argentina to the west and across Barra do Quaraí of Brazil, which is only 6 kilometres (3.7 mi) to the northeast, joined by a bridge over Río Cuareim. As located in the northern extremity of the country, Bella Unión is slightly closer to Asunción, (capital city of Paraguay) than to its own capital, Montevideo.

=== Climate ===
Climate data for Bella Unión (1980–2009)
Month	Jan	Feb	Mar	Apr	May	Jun	Jul	Aug	Sep	Oct	Nov	Dec	Year
Mean daily maximum °C (°F)	32.0 (89.6)	30.5 (86.9)	29.0 (84.2)	25.0 (77.0)	21.5 (70.7)	19.0 (66.2)	18.6 (65.5)	21.2 (70.2)	22.7 (72.9)	25.5 (77.9)	27.9 (82.2)	29.7 (85.5)	25.2 (77.4)
Daily mean °C (°F)	26.0 (78.8)	24.9 (76.8)	23.7 (74.7)	20.0 (68.0)	16.5 (61.7)	14.4 (57.9)	13.6 (56.5)	15.4 (59.7)	17.1 (62.8)	20.1 (68.2)	22.0 (71.6)	24.2 (75.6)	19.8 (67.6)
Mean daily minimum °C (°F)	20.1 (68.2)	19.4 (66.9)	18.3 (64.9)	14.9 (58.8)	11.6 (52.9)	9.8 (49.6)	8.7 (47.7)	9.6 (49.3)	11.4 (52.5)	14.8 (58.6)	16.2 (61.2)	18.7 (65.7)	14.5 (58.1)
Average precipitation mm (inches)	141.4 (5.57)	144.4 (5.69)	145.9 (5.74)	175.6 (6.91)	109.1 (4.30)	90.1 (3.55)	55.3 (2.18)	55.4 (2.18)	96.9 (3.81)	151.0 (5.94)	150.9 (5.94)	132.8 (5.23)	1,448.8 (57.04)
Average relative humidity (%)	65	69	72	76	77	79	76	71	69	68	66	64	71
Mean monthly sunshine hours	297.6	245.8	244.9	186.0	189.1	162.0	176.7	192.2	204.0	241.8	267.0	300.7	2,707.8
Mean daily sunshine hours	9.6	8.7	7.9	6.2	6.1	5.4	5.7	6.2	6.8	7.8	8.9	9.7	7.4
Source: Instituto Nacional de Investigación Agropecuaria

== Places of worship ==
- St. Rose of Lima of the Cuareim Parish Church (Roman Catholic)

== Notable local person ==
The writer Jesús Moraes, (1955-), who specializes in short stories in Spanish, is from Bella Unión, and is one of the relatively few contemporary Uruguayan writers strongly identified with the Uruguayan north.
