= Artigas, Uruguay =

Capital city of Artigas Department, Uruguay

Artigas
- Capital city
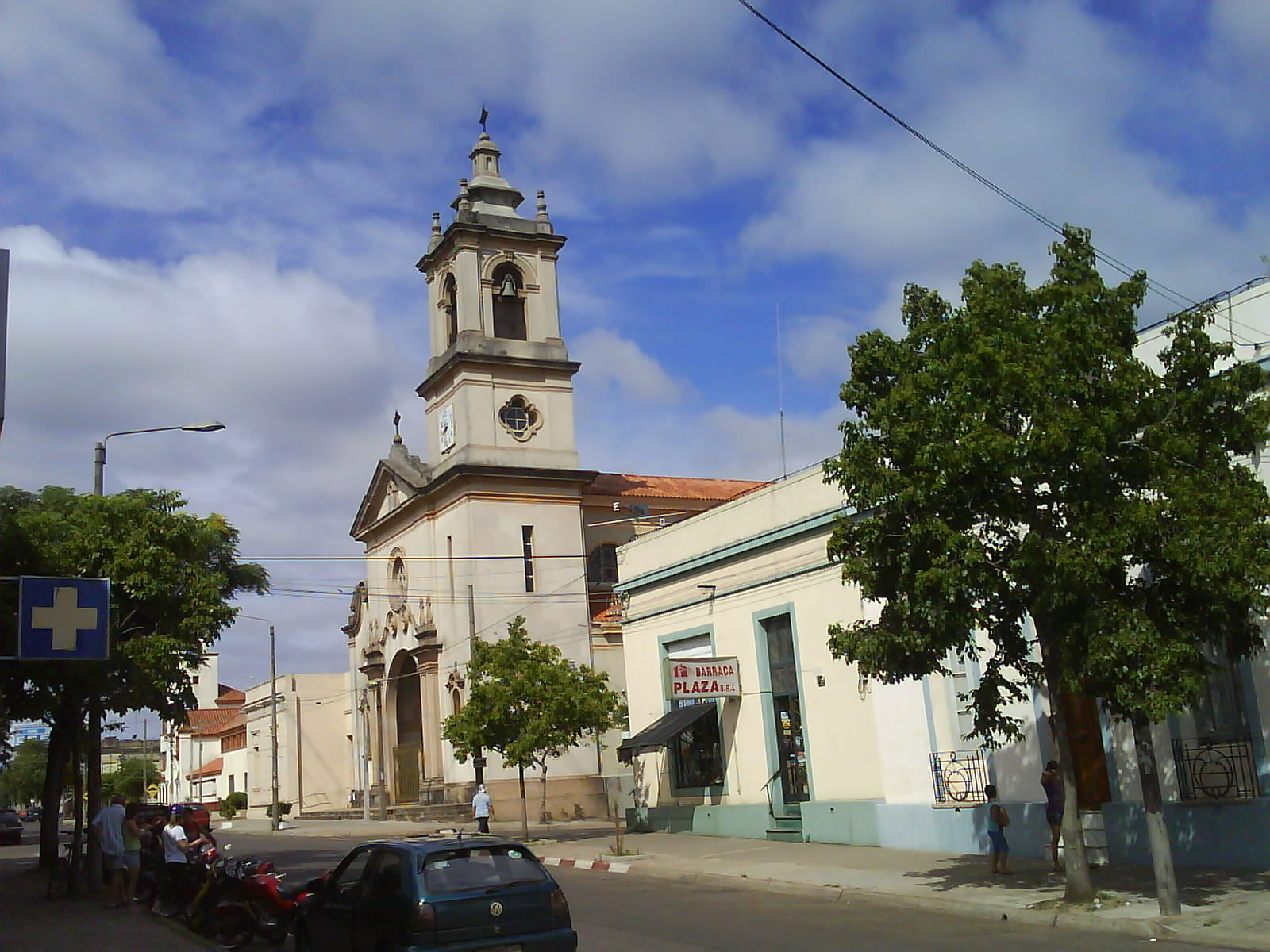
- Church of the Sacred Heart

- Coat of arms

- Location within Uruguay
- Coordinates: 30°28′0″S 56°28′0″W
- Country: Uruguay
- Department: Artigas
- Founded: September 12, 1852
- Founder: Don Carlos Catalá

Area
  - Total: 16.8 km^{2} (6.5 sq mi)
- Elevation: 121 m (397 ft)

Population (2023 Census)
  - Total: 43,897
  - Density: 2,610/km^{2} (6,770/sq mi)
- Demonym: artiguense
- Time zone: UTC−3 (UYT)
- Postal Code: 55000
- Dial plan: +598 477 (+5 digits)
- Climate: Cfa

Artigas (Spanish pronunciation: [aɾ.ˈti.ɣas]) is the capital of the Artigas Department of Uruguay. It is named after the national hero, José Gervasio Artigas, who fought for the emancipation of the River Plate, and sought to create a federative nation from these colonies. As of 2023, it is the eleventh most populous city in the country with a population of 43,897.

== History ==
Artigas was founded on 12 September 1852 by Don Carlos Catalá as a town under the name San Eugenio del Cuareim. On 5 September 1884 it became capital of the department. It was renamed Artigas and its status was elevated from villa (town) to ciudad (city) on 31 August 1915.

== Economy ==
Artigas is a centre for trading grain crops (primarily maize) with Argentina and Brazil. The railroad station and, since 1973, airport are focused on this commerce.

The hills in the area contain significant numbers of precious stones, especially agate and amethyst, which were first found in 1860, since when mining has taken place. Souvenirs and handicrafts made using these gem stones are produced in Artigas and exported widely.

=== IUGS geological heritage site ===
In respect of it being 'the site of world-class amethyst deposits, where the largest amethyst-filled giant geodes were ever found', the International Union of Geological Sciences (IUGS) included the 'Deposits of Amethyst of Los Catalanes Gemological District' in its assemblage of 100 'geological heritage sites' around the world in a listing published in October 2022. The organisation defines an IUGS Geological Heritage Site as 'a key place with geological elements and/or processes of international scientific relevance, used as a reference, and/or with a substantial contribution to the development of geological sciences through history.'

== Population ==
In 2011 Artigas had a population of 40,658.

Year	Population
1852	335
1908	8,857
1963	23,429
1975	29,256
1985	35,117
1996	40,244
2004	41,687
2011	40,658
2023	43,897

Source: National Statistics Institute

== Geography ==
The city is located on Uruguay's border with Brazil. It is separated from the Brazilian town of Quaraí, Rio Grande do Sul, by a river. Quaraí is accessible from Artigas by bridge. It is the farthest city from Uruguay's capital Montevideo, being 600 kilometres (370 mi) away.

=== Climate ===
Artigas has a humid subtropical climate, described by the Köppen climate classification as Cfa. Summers are warm to hot and winters are cool, with the occurrence of frosts and fog. The precipitation is evenly distributed throughout the year, with an average of roughly 1,535 mm (60.4 in), and the annual average temperature is around 19.6 °C (67.3 °F).

Climate data for Artigas, Uruguay (1991–2020, extremes 1944–present)
Month	Jan	Feb	Mar	Apr	May	Jun	Jul	Aug	Sep	Oct	Nov	Dec	Year
Record high °C (°F)	40.9 (105.6)	41.5 (106.7)	40.8 (105.4)	36.0 (96.8)	33.0 (91.4)	30.2 (86.4)	30.5 (86.9)	34.4 (93.9)	37.0 (98.6)	37.4 (99.3)	40.8 (105.4)	41.4 (106.5)	41.5 (106.7)
Mean daily maximum °C (°F)	32.2 (90.0)	31.1 (88.0)	29.4 (84.9)	25.7 (78.3)	21.5 (70.7)	19.2 (66.6)	18.7 (65.7)	21.1 (70.0)	22.4 (72.3)	25.0 (77.0)	28.0 (82.4)	30.8 (87.4)	25.4 (77.8)
Daily mean °C (°F)	25.8 (78.4)	25.0 (77.0)	23.3 (73.9)	19.9 (67.8)	16.2 (61.2)	14.0 (57.2)	13.3 (55.9)	15.2 (59.4)	16.7 (62.1)	19.4 (66.9)	21.7 (71.1)	24.3 (75.7)	19.6 (67.2)
Mean daily minimum °C (°F)	19.4 (66.9)	18.9 (66.0)	17.3 (63.1)	14.2 (57.6)	10.9 (51.6)	8.9 (48.0)	7.9 (46.2)	9.3 (48.7)	11.0 (51.8)	13.8 (56.8)	15.5 (59.9)	17.9 (64.2)	13.8 (56.7)
Record low °C (°F)	8.2 (46.8)	7.9 (46.2)	5.0 (41.0)	1.8 (35.2)	−3.0 (26.6)	−4.6 (23.7)	−5.2 (22.6)	−4.3 (24.3)	−2.8 (27.0)	1.2 (34.2)	3.0 (37.4)	6.0 (42.8)	−5.2 (22.6)
Average precipitation mm (inches)	142.8 (5.62)	137.0 (5.39)	118.4 (4.66)	180.1 (7.09)	136.2 (5.36)	92.1 (3.63)	80.2 (3.16)	65.4 (2.57)	119.5 (4.70)	158.3 (6.23)	150.2 (5.91)	155.2 (6.11)	1,535.4 (60.43)
Average precipitation days (≥ 1.0 mm)	7	7	6	8	6	6	6	6	7	8	7	7	81
Average relative humidity (%)	61	68	70	72	77	79	75	70	69	69	65	61	70
Mean monthly sunshine hours	276.7	231.8	233.1	188.7	168.3	138.7	164.4	198.2	192.2	217.3	262.7	274.7	2,546.8
Source 1: Instituto Uruguayo de Metereología
Source 2: NOAA (precipitation and sun 1991–2020), Instituto Nacional de Investigación Agropecuaria (humidity 1980–2009)

== Transportation ==
The city uses Artigas International Airport.

== Consular representation ==
Brazil has a Vice-consulate in Artigas.

== Places of worship ==
- San Eugenio del Cuareim, Artigas|St. Eugene of the Cuareim Parish Church (Roman Catholic)

== Notable people ==
- Adelia Silva (1925–2004), educator and writer who had a significant role in elevating the civil rights of black people in Uruguay.
- Darwin Núñez (born 1999), footballer
- Pablo Aurrecochea (born 1981), footballer
- Agustín Da Silveira (born 2000), footballer
